= Luca Cantagalli =

Italian volleyball former player

Personal information
- Born: 8 December 1965 (age 60); Cavriago, Province of Reggio Emilia, Italy
- Height: 199 cm (6 ft 6 in)

Volleyball information
- Position: Outside hitter
- Number: 10

National team
1986–1996	Italy
Honours
Men's volleyball
Representing Italy
Olympic Games
Silver medal – second place	1996 Atlanta	Team
World Championship
Gold medal – first place	1990 Brazil	Team
Gold medal – first place	1994 Greece	Team
FIVB World Cup
Silver medal – second place	1989 Japan
World Grand Champions Cup
Gold medal – first place	1993 Japan
FIVB World League
Gold medal – first place	1990 Osaka
Gold medal – first place	1991 Milan
Gold medal – first place	1992 Genoa
Gold medal – first place	1994 Milan
Silver medal – second place	1996 Rotterdam
Bronze medal – third place	1993 São Paulo
Goodwill Games
Gold medal – first place	1990 Seattle
European Championship
Gold medal – first place	1989 Sweden
Gold medal – first place	1993 Finland
Gold medal – first place	1995 Greece
Silver medal – second place	1991 Germany

Luca Cantagalli (born 8 December 1965, in Cavriago) is an Italian volleyball former player who was twice World champion with his national team in 1990 and 1994. He was nicknamed "bazooka" by the fans, due to his powerful spikes. He competed at three Olympic Games, winning a silver medal at the 1996 Summer Olympics in Atlanta.

== Career ==
Debuting on 18 March 1986, he totalled 330 caps for Italy men's national volleyball team. He was four times Italian champion and three times European Champion (1989, 1993 and 1995).

After announcing his retire at the end of the 2005–2006 season, he played shortly for the team of his native Cavriago in the A2 series of Italy. Cantagalli retired in 2007.

== Clubs ==
Club	Country	From	To
Panini Modena	Italy	1980-1981	1989-1990
Sisley Treviso	Italy	1990-1991	1992-1993
Modena	Italy	1993-1994	1997-1998
Palermo	Italy	1998-1999	1999-2000
Modena	Italy	2000-2001	2003-2004
Taranto	Italy	2004-2005	2004-2005
Santa Croce sull'Arno	Italy	2005-2006	2005-2006
Cavriago	Italy	2006-2007	
