= Paolo Tofoli =

Italian volleyball player and coach

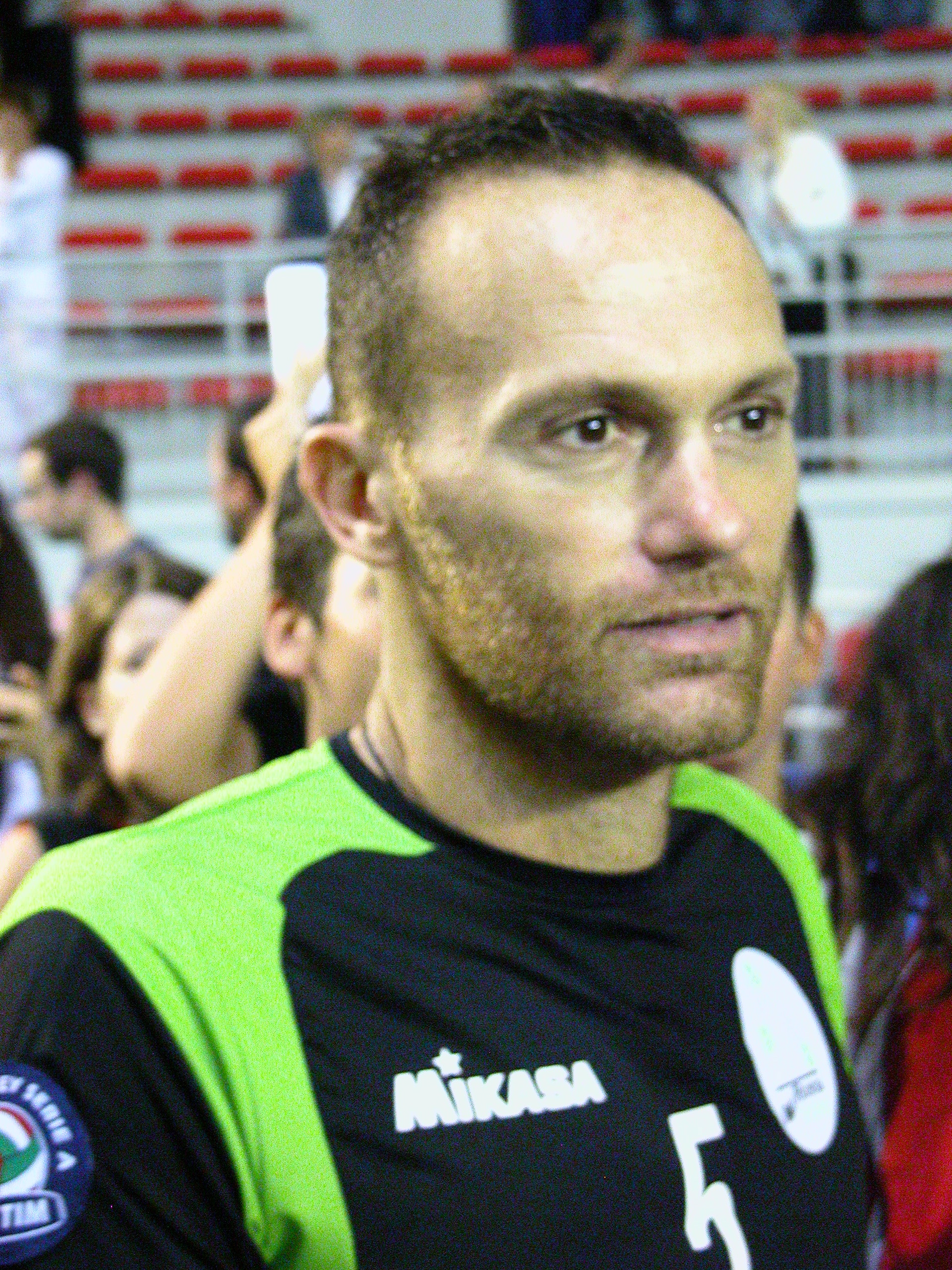
- Tofoli in 2006

Personal information
- Born: 14 August 1966 (age 60); Fermo, Italy
- Height: 188 cm (6 ft 2 in)

Volleyball information
- Position: Setter
- Number: 5
Honours
Men's volleyball
Representing Italy
Olympic Games
Silver medal – second place	1996 Atlanta	Team
Silver medal – second place	2004 Athens	Team
Bronze medal – third place	2000 Sydney	Team
World Championship
Gold medal – first place	1990 Brazil	Team
Gold medal – first place	1994 Greece	Team
World Cup
Gold medal – first place	1995 Japan
Silver medal – second place	1989 Japan
Bronze medal – third place	1999 Japan
World Grand Champions Cup
Gold medal – first place	1993 Japan
Goodwill Games
Gold medal – first place	1990 Seattle
World League
Gold medal – first place	1990 Osaka
Gold medal – first place	1991 Milan
Gold medal – first place	1992 Genoa
Gold medal – first place	1994 Milan
Gold medal – first place	2000 Rotterdam
Silver medal – second place	1996 Rotterdam
Silver medal – second place	2004 Rome
Bronze medal – third place	1993 São Paulo
European Championship
Gold medal – first place	1989 Sweden
Gold medal – first place	1993 Finland
Gold medal – first place	1995 Greece
Gold medal – first place	1999 Austria
Silver medal – second place	1991 Germany

Paolo Tofoli (born 14 August 1966) is an Italian former volleyball player and current coach, standing at 188 cm.

Tofoli played 342 times for the Italy national volleyball team. Tofoli was a two-time world champion in 1990 and 1994. He was also a four-time gold medalist at the European Championship (1989, 1993, 1995 and 1999). He represented Italy at four Summer Olympics, winning two silver medals and a bronze medal.

== Coaching ==
Since the 2010–11 season, Tofoli has been working as the coach of the Italian women's volleyball team Scavolini Pesaro.

== Clubs ==
Club	Country	From	To
Padova	Italy	1984–1985	1989–1990
Sisley Treviso	Italy	1990–1991	1996–1997
Ferrara	Italy	1997–1998	1997–1998
Rome	Italy	1998–1999	2000–2001
Trento	Italy	2001–2002	2004–2005
Perugia	Italy	2005–2006	2005–2006
M. Roma Volley	Italy	2006–2007	2008–2009

== Individual awards ==
- 1990 FIVB World League "Best Setter"
- 1994 FIVB Volleyball Men's World Championship Best Setter

=== State awards ===
- 2000 Knight's Order of Merit of the Italian Republic
- 2004 Officer's Order of Merit of the Italian Republic
