= Marco Martinelli (volleyball) =

Italian volleyball player and coach

Personal information
- Born: 9 October 1965 (age 61); Rovereto, Trentino, Italy
- Height: 200 cm (6 ft 7 in)

Volleyball information
- Position: Middle blocker
- Number: 2

National team
1990–1994	Italy
Honours
Men's volleyball
Representing Italy
World Championship
Gold medal – first place	1990 Brazil	Team
Gold medal – first place	1994 Greece	Team
FIVB World League
Gold medal – first place	1990 Osaka
Gold medal – first place	1991 Milan
Gold medal – first place	1992 Genoa
Gold medal – first place	1994 Milan
Bronze medal – third place	1993 São Paulo
European Championship
Gold medal – first place	1993 Finland
Silver medal – second place	1991 Germany

Marco Martinelli (born 9 October 1965) is an Italian former volleyball player, who later became a volleyball coach. He earned a total number of 155 caps for the Men's National Team, and made his debut on 22 May 1987 in Montichiari against Poland.
