= Marco Bracci =

Italian volleyball player (born 1966)

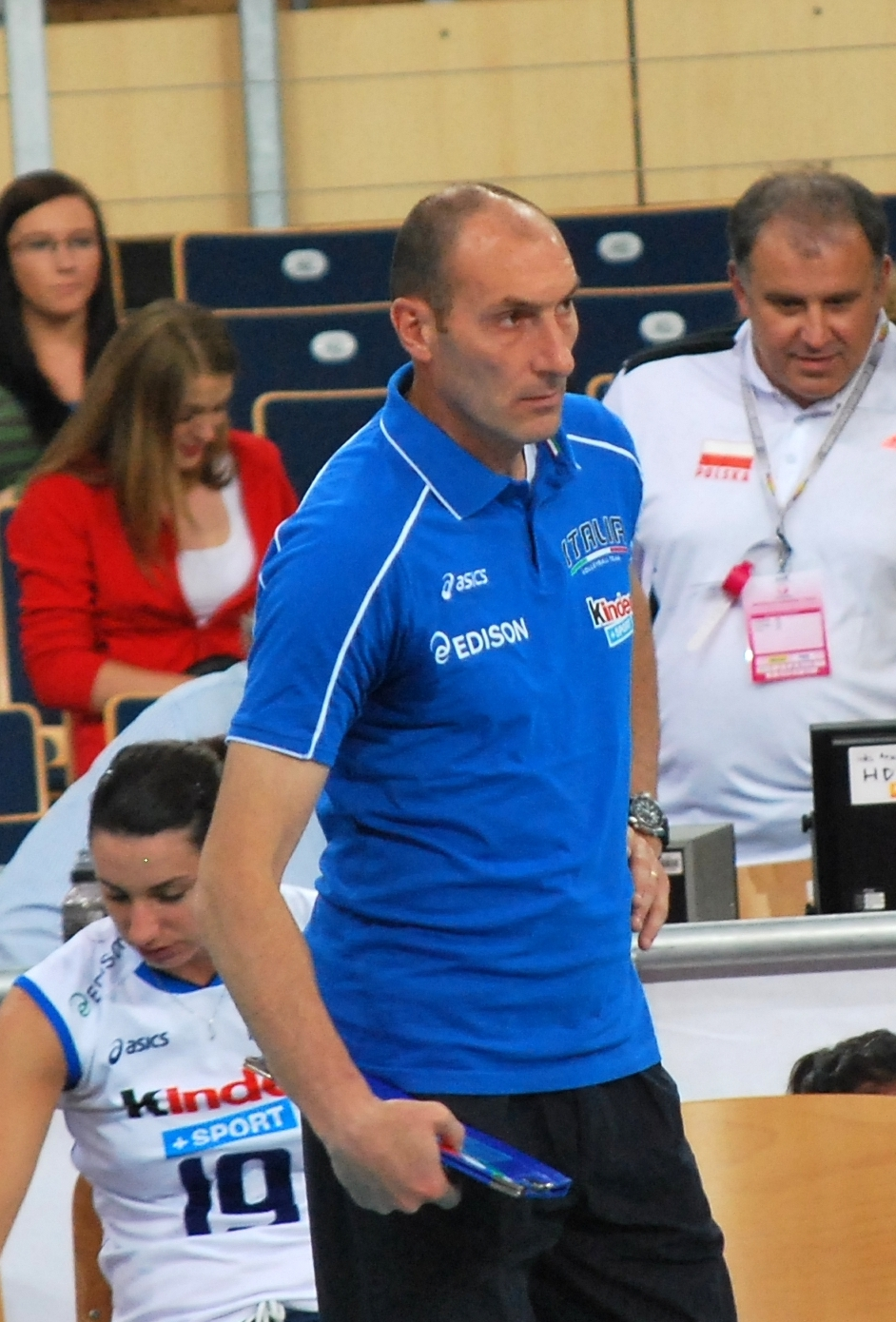

Personal information
- Born: 23 August 1966 (age 60); Fucecchio, Italy
- Height: 197 cm (6 ft 6 in)
Medal record
Men's volleyball
Representing Italy
Olympic Games
| Silver medal – second place | 1996 Atlanta | Team |
| Bronze medal – third place | 2000 Sydney | Team |
World Championship
| Gold medal – first place | 1990 Brazil | Team |
| Gold medal – first place | 1994 Greece | Team |
| Gold medal – first place | 1998 Japan | Team |
World Cup
| Gold medal – first place | 1995 Japan |
| Silver medal – second place | 1989 Japan |
| Bronze medal – third place | 1999 Japan |
World Grand Champions Cup
| Gold medal – first place | 1993 Japan |
Goodwill Games
| Gold medal – first place | 1990 Seattle |
World League
| Gold medal – first place | 1990 Osaka |
| Gold medal – first place | 1991 Milan |
| Gold medal – first place | 1992 Genoa |
| Gold medal – first place | 1994 Milan |
| Gold medal – first place | 2000 Rotterdam |
| Silver medal – second place | 1996 Rotterdam |
| Bronze medal – third place | 1993 São Paulo |
European Championship
| Gold medal – first place | 1989 Sweden |
| Gold medal – first place | 1993 Finland |
| Gold medal – first place | 1995 Greece |
| Gold medal – first place | 1999 Austria |
Mediterranean Games
| Gold medal – first place | 1991 Athens |

Marco Bracci (born 23 August 1966) is a former Italian volleyball player, ranked amongst the world's most valuable players of the late 1980s and 1990s. A 197 cm athlete, Bracci played as passer-hitter.

Bracci made his debut for the Italian national team on 6 May 1988. He earned 344 caps for his native country, winning three Volleyball World Championships (1990, 1994 and 1998) and four Volleyball European Championships (1989, 1993, 1995 and 1999), plus numerous other titles. One of the most winning players of all-time in the Italian Championships, his club titles include six scudetti and four European Champions Cups.

Bracci played at four Olympic Games, winning a silver medal at the 1996 Games and a bronze medal at the 2000 Olympics.

== Coaching ==
Bracci has worked as an assistant coach to Massimo Barbolini, the head coach of the Italian women's national volleyball team.

== Clubs ==
| Club | Country | From | To |
|---|---|---|---|
| Parma | Italy | 1987-1988 | 1993-1994 |
| Modena | Italy | 1994-1995 | 1997-1998 |
| Piaggio Roma | Italy | 1998-1999 | 2000-2001 |
| Macerata | Italy | 2001-2002 | 2004-2005 |
