= 1993 FIVB Volleyball Men's World Grand Champions Cup =

Volleyball tournament in Japan

1993 Men's World Grand Champions Cup
Tournament details
- Host country: Japan
- Dates: 23–28 November
- Teams: 6
- Venues: 2 (in 2 host cities)

Final positions
- Champions: Italy (1st title)

The 1993 FIVB Volleyball Men's World Grand Champions Cup was held in Japan from 23 to 28 November 1993.

== Qualification ==
Team	Qualified as
Japan	Hosts
South Korea	1993 Asian Champions
Italy	1993 European Champions
Cuba	1993 NORCECA Champions
Brazil	1993 South American Champions
United States	Wild Card

== Competition formula ==
The competition formula of the 1993 Men's World Grand Champions Cup was the single Round-Robin system. Each team plays once against each of the 5 remaining teams. Points were accumulated during the whole tournament, and the final standing was determined by the total points gained.

== Venues ==
- Osaka-jō Hall, Osaka, Japan
- Yoyogi National Gymnasium, Tokyo, Japan

== Results ==
Pos	Team	Pld	W	L	Pts	SW	SL	SR	SPW	SPL	SPR
1	Italy	5	5	0	10	15	4	3.750	265	208	1.274
2	Brazil	5	4	1	9	14	6	2.333	268	226	1.186
3	Cuba	5	3	2	8	11	8	1.375	243	212	1.146
4	Japan	5	2	3	7	9	10	0.900	236	241	0.979
5	United States	5	1	4	6	5	14	0.357	202	255	0.792
6	South Korea	5	0	5	5	3	15	0.200	184	256	0.719

=== Osaka round ===
Date		Score		Set 1	Set 2	Set 3	Set 4	Set 5	Total
23 Nov	Cuba	1–3	Brazil	15–8	10–15	8–15	6–15		39–53
23 Nov	South Korea	0–3	Italy	5–15	9–15	9–15			23–45
23 Nov	Japan	3–1	United States	15–12	13–15	15–10	15–11		58–48
24 Nov	Italy	3–1	Japan	8–15	15–9	15–12	15–13		53–49
24 Nov	Brazil	3–1	United States	4–15	15–13	15–13	15–8		49–49
24 Nov	Cuba	3–1	South Korea	15–10	13–15	15–8	15–8		58–41

=== Tokyo round ===
Date		Score		Set 1	Set 2	Set 3	Set 4	Set 5	Total
26 Nov	United States	0–3	Italy	5–15	7–15	8–15			20–45
26 Nov	South Korea	0–3	Brazil	9–15	12–15	7–15			28–45
26 Nov	Japan	1–3	Cuba	15–9	2–15	12–15	13–15		42–54
27 Nov	Brazil	2–3	Italy	15–8	15–17	13–15	15–13	11–15	69–68
27 Nov	Cuba	3–0	United States	15–7	15–6	15–9			45–22
27 Nov	South Korea	0–3	Japan	9–15	13–15	12–15			34–45
28 Nov	Italy	3–1	Cuba	15–10	15–9	9–15	15–13		54–47
28 Nov	United States	3–2	South Korea	8–15	10–15	15–7	15–8	15–13	63–58
28 Nov	Japan	1–3	Brazil	8–15	8–15	15–7	11–15		42–52

== Final standing ==
Rank	Team
1st place, gold medalist(s)	Italy
2nd place, silver medalist(s)	Brazil
3rd place, bronze medalist(s)	Cuba
4	Japan
5	United States
6	South Korea

1993 Men's World Grand Champions Cup champions

Italy
First title

Team Roster

Marco Bracci, Claudio Galli, Andrea Gardini, Andrea Giani, Pasquale Gravina, Andrea Zorzi, Luca Cantagalli, Davide Bellini, Damiano Pippi, Michele Pasinato, Lorenzo Bernardi

Head Coach: Julio Velasco
