= Italy men's national volleyball team =

National team representing Italy in men's volleyball matches

Italy
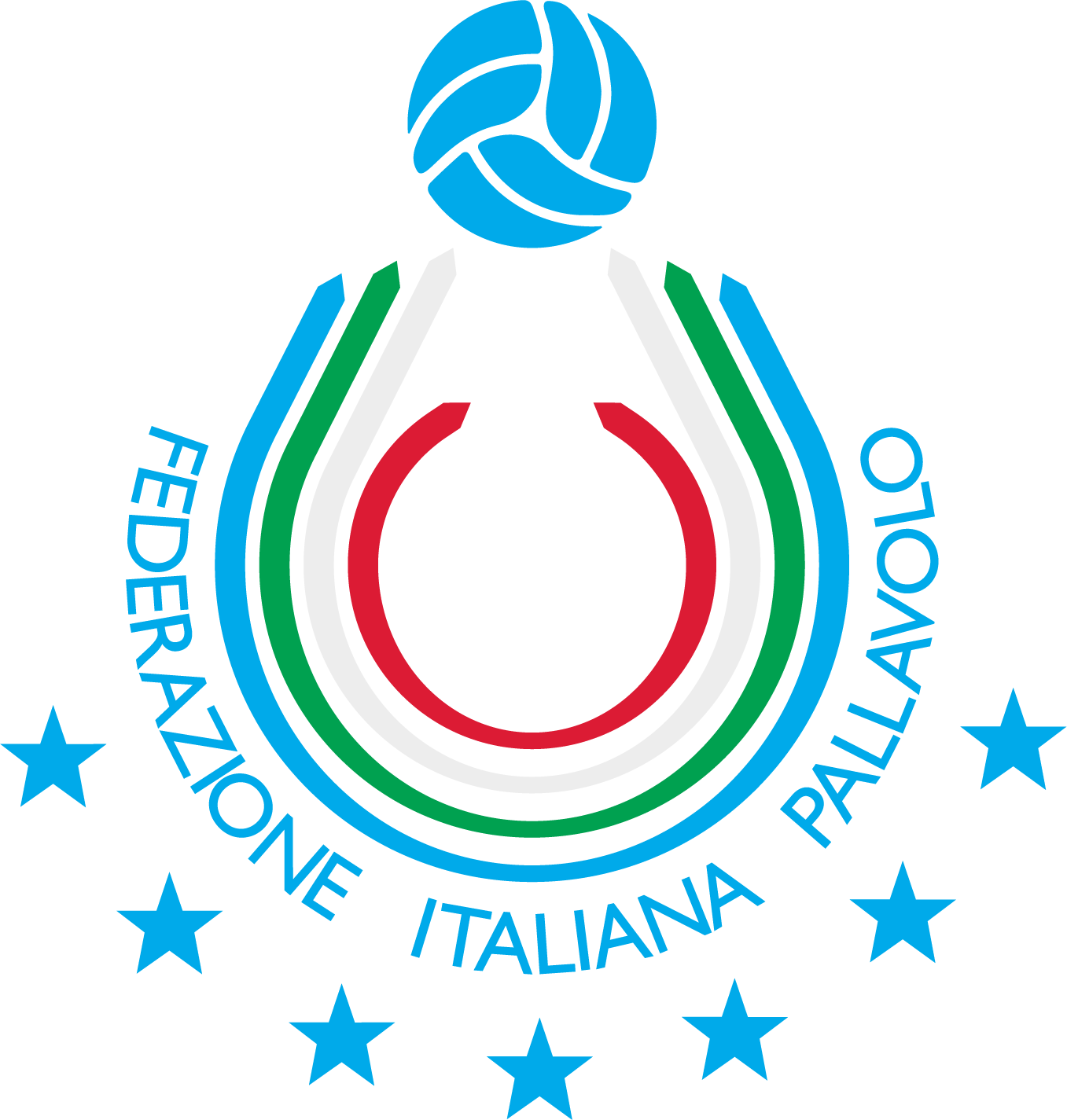
- Nickname(s): Gli Azzurri (The Blues)
- Association: FIPAV
- Confederation: CEV
- Head coach: Ferdinando De Giorgi
- FIVB ranking: 2 (15 October 2026)

Uniforms
Home	Away	Third

Summer Olympics
- Appearances: 13 (First in 1976)
- Best result: (1996, 2004, 2016)

World Championship
- Appearances: 19 (First in 1949)
- Best result: (1990, 1994, 1998, 2022, 2025)

World Cup
- Appearances: 8 (First in 1989)
- Best result: (1995)

European Championship
- Appearances: 29 (First in 1948)
- Best result: (1989, 1993, 1995, 1999, 2003, 2005, 2021)
- federvolley.it
Honours
Event	1st	2nd	3rd
Olympic Games	0	3	3
World Championship	5	1	0
World Cup	1	3	1
World Grand Champions Cup	1	1	2
World League	8	3	4
Nations League	0	1	0
European Championship	7	5	3
Universiade	3	1	5
Mediterranean Games	7	2	2
Goodwill Games	1	0	0
Total	33	20	20
Medal record
Olympics
Silver medal – second place	1996 Atlanta	Team
Silver medal – second place	2004 Athens	Team
Silver medal – second place	2016 Rio de Janeiro	Team
Bronze medal – third place	1984 Los Angeles	Team
Bronze medal – third place	2000 Sydney	Team
Bronze medal – third place	2012 London	Team
World Championship
Gold medal – first place	1990 Brazil	
Gold medal – first place	1994 Greece	
Gold medal – first place	1998 Japan	
Gold medal – first place	2022 Poland/Slovenia	
Gold medal – first place	2025 Philippines	
Silver medal – second place	1978 Italy	
World Cup
Gold medal – first place	1995 Japan	
Silver medal – second place	1989 Japan	
Silver medal – second place	2003 Japan	
Silver medal – second place	2015 Japan	
Bronze medal – third place	1999 Japan	
World Grand Champions Cup
Gold medal – first place	1993 Japan	
Silver medal – second place	2017 Japan	
Bronze medal – third place	2005 Japan	
Bronze medal – third place	2013 Japan	
World League
Gold medal – first place	1990 Osaka	
Gold medal – first place	1991 Milan	
Gold medal – first place	1992 Genoa	
Gold medal – first place	1994 Milan	
Gold medal – first place	1995 Rio de Janeiro	
Gold medal – first place	1997 Moscow	
Gold medal – first place	1999 Mar del Plata	
Gold medal – first place	2000 Rotterdam	
Silver medal – second place	1996 Rotterdam	
Silver medal – second place	2001 Katowice	
Silver medal – second place	2004 Rome	
Bronze medal – third place	1993 São Paulo	
Bronze medal – third place	2003 Madrid	
Bronze medal – third place	2013 Mar del Plata	
Bronze medal – third place	2014 Florence	
Nations League
Silver medal – second place	2025 Ningbo	
European Championship
Gold medal – first place	1989 Sweden	
Gold medal – first place	1993 Finland	
Gold medal – first place	1995 Greece	
Gold medal – first place	1999 Austria	
Gold medal – first place	2003 Germany	
Gold medal – first place	2005 Italy/Serbia and Montenegro	
Gold medal – first place	2021 Poland/Czech Republic/Estonia/Finland	
Silver medal – second place	1991 Germany	
Silver medal – second place	2001 Czech Republic	
Silver medal – second place	2011 Austria/Czech Republic	
Silver medal – second place	2013 Denmark/Poland	
Silver medal – second place	2023 Bulgaria/Israel/Italy/North Macedonia	
Bronze medal – third place	1948 Italy	
Bronze medal – third place	1997 Netherlands	
Bronze medal – third place	2015 Bulgaria/Italy	
Universiade
Gold medal – first place	1970 Turin	
Gold medal – first place	2019 Naples	
Gold medal – first place	2021 Chengdu	
Silver medal – second place	1997 Sicilly	
Bronze medal – third place	1983 Edmonton	
Bronze medal – third place	1985 Kobe	
Bronze medal – third place	1987 Zagreb	
Bronze medal – third place	1995 Fukuoka	
Bronze medal – third place	2005 Izmir	
Bronze medal – third place	2025 Berlin	
Mediterranean Games
Gold medal – first place	1959 Lebanon	
Gold medal – first place	1983 Casablanca	
Gold medal – first place	1991 Athens	
Gold medal – first place	2001 Tunis	
Gold medal – first place	2009 Pescara	
Gold medal – first place	2013 Mersin	
Gold medal – first place	2018 Tarragona	
Silver medal – second place	1963 Naples	
Silver medal – second place	1975 Algiers	
Bronze medal – third place	1987 Latakia	
Bronze medal – third place	2022 Oran	
Goodwill Games
Gold medal – first place	1990 Seattle	

The Italy men's national volleyball team represents the country in international competitions and friendly matches. The national team is controlled by the Italian Volleyball Federation, the governing body for Volleyball in Italy. It is one of the most successful national teams in the history of volleyball, having won five World Championships (1990, 1994, 1998, 2022 and 2025), seven European Championships (1989, 1993, 1995, 1999, 2003, 2005, and 2021), one World Cup (1995), and eight World Leagues (1990, 1991, 1992, 1994, 1995, 1997, 1999, and 2000). Italy is the reigning world champion, having won the 2025 FIVB Volleyball Men's World Championship on 28 September 2025. Italy equaled a record previously held by the USSR by becoming world volleyball champions in both men’s and women’s competitions — a feat the Soviet Union had achieved in 1952 and 1960.

== Result history ==
Until the late 1980s, Italy's best results were a silver medal in the home-held 1978 World Championships and a bronze medal at the 1984 Olympic Games. Two years later, Italy classified only 12th at the 1986 World Championships. Subsequenrtly, Italy finished 9th at both the 1987 European championships and the 1988 Summer Olympics. The Italian federation decided for a hiring Julio Velasco as coach, after his successful tenure at Panini Modena.

Velasco immediately led them to a gold medal at the European Championships in 1989, a tournament his team won twice more in 1993 and 1995. The team also won a silver medal at the World Cup in 1989. He de-emphasized the specialization trend of the 1980s and introduce the concept of the “square”, team unity where the team was better than the sum of its players.

Starting at the 1990 World Championships and the 1990 Goodwill Games, the Italian National team swept the world volleyball events for five years. They won a gold medal in the World Championships in 1990 and 1994, the World League in 1990, 1991, 1992, 1994 and 1995, the 1991 Mediterranean Games, and the 1993 Grand Champions Cup. They won a silver medal at the 1996 Olympic Games. Julio Velasco left the Italian National Men's Team in 1996. Velasco in 1989-1996 created Golden Team with Players such as Zorzi, Andrea Gardini, Giani, Bernardi, Gravina, Bracci, Tofoli, Lucchetta, Papi, Pasinato and Meoni.

=== Olympic Games ===
Champions Runners up Third place Fourth place

Olympic Games record
Year	Round	Position	GP	MW	ML	SW	SL	Squad
(Japan) 1964	Did not qualify							
(Mexico) 1968	Did not qualify							
(West Germany) 1972	Did not qualify							
(Canada) 1976	1st round	8th	5	0	5	2	15	Squad
(Soviet Union) 1980	1st round	9th	5	2	3	5	11	Squad
(United States) 1984	Semifinals	3rd	6	4	2	14	7	Squad
(South Korea) 1988	1st round	9th	7	4	3	13	13	Squad
(Spain) 1992	Quarterfinals	5th	7	5	2	18	8	Squad
(United States) 1996	Final	2nd	8	7	1	23	5	Squad
(Australia) 2000	Semifinals	3rd	8	7	1	21	8	Squad
(Greece) 2004	Final	2nd	8	5	3	20	11	Squad
(China) 2008	Semifinals	4th	8	5	3	17	14	Squad
(United Kingdom) 2012	Semifinals	3rd	8	5	3	16	13	Squad
(Brazil) 2016	Final	2nd	8	6	2	19	10	Squad
(Japan) 2020	Quarterfinals	6th	6	4	2	14	10	Squad
(France) 2024	Semifinals	4th	6	4	2	12	10	Squad
(United States) 2028	Future events							
(Australia) 2032	Future events							
Total	0 titles	13/16	90	58	32	194	135	—

=== World Championship ===
Champions Runners up Third place Fourth place

World Championship record
Year	Round	Position	GP	MW	ML	SW	SL	Squad
(Czechoslovakia) 1949	1st round	8th	5	2	3	8	9	Squad
(Soviet Union) 1952	Did not qualify							
(France) 1956	1st round	14th	10	6	4	22	14	Squad
(Soviet Union) 1960	Did not qualify							
(Soviet Union) 1962	1st round	14th	11	5	6	19	23	Squad
(Czechoslovakia) 1966	1st round	16th	11	2	9	9	31	Squad
(Bulgaria) 1970	1st round	15th	11	3	8	23	28	Squad
(Mexico) 1974	1st round	19th	11	7	4	24	14	Squad
(Italy) 1978	Final	2nd	10	8	2	24	12	Squad
(Argentina) 1982	1st round	14th	10	8	2	24	12	Squad
(France) 1986	2nd round	11th	8	3	5	14	18	Squad
(Brazil) 1990	Final	1st	7	6	1	18	7	Squad
(Greece) 1994	Final	1st	7	6	1	20	6	Squad
(Japan) 1998	Final	1st	12	11	1	33	7	Squad
(Argentina) 2002	Quarterfinals	5th	9	6	3	23	14	Squad
(Japan) 2006	2nd round	5th	11	8	3	28	13	Squad
(Italy) 2010	Semifinals	4th	10	8	2	26	12	Squad
(Poland) 2014	2nd round	13th	9	3	6	14	22	Squad
(Italy) (Bulgaria) 2018	3rd round	5th	10	8	2	26	11	Squad
(Poland) (Slovenia) 2022	Final	1st	7	7	0	21	4	Squad
(Philippines) 2025	Final	1st	7	6	1	20	4	Squad
(Poland) 2027	Qualified							
(Qatar) 2029	Future event							
Total	5 titles	19/21	176	113	63	396	261	—

- (Brazil) 1990 — Gold medal
  Anastasi, Bernardi, Bracci, Cantagalli, De Giorgi, Gardini, Giani, Lucchetta, Martinelli, Masciarelli, Tofoli, Zorzi. Head Coach: Velasco
- (Greece) 1994 — Gold medal
  Bernardi, Bracci, Cantagalli, Gardini, Giani, De Giorgi, Giretto, Gravina, Papi, Pippi, Tofoli, Zorzi. Head Coach: Velasco
- (Japan) 1998 — Gold medal
  Bracci, Corsano, Fei, Gardini, Giani, De Giorgi, Gravina, Meoni, Papi, Pasinato, Rosalba, Sartoretti. Head Coach: Bebeto
- (Poland) / (Slovenia) 2022 — Gold medal
  Anzani, Balaso, Bottolo, Galassi, Giannelli, Lavia, Michieletto, Mosca, Pinali, Recine, Romanò, Russo, Sbertoli, Scanferla. Head Coach: De Giorgi
- (Philippines) 2025 — Gold medal
  Anzani, Balaso, Bottolo, Galassi, Gargiulo, Giannelli, Michieletto, Pace, Porro, Romanò, Russo, Rychlicki, Sani, Sbertoli. Head Coach: De Giorgi

=== World Cup ===
Champions Runners up Third place Fourth place

World Cup record
Year	Round	Position	GP	MW	ML	SW	SL	Squad
(Poland) 1965	Did not qualify							
(East Germany) 1969	Did not qualify							
(Japan) 1977	Did not qualify							
(Japan) 1981	-	7th	7	1	6	9	18	Squad
(Japan) 1985	Did not qualify							
(Japan) 1989	-	2nd	7	6	1	20	5	Squad
(Japan) 1991	Did not qualify							
(Japan) 1995	-	1st	11	11	0	33	3	Squad
(Japan) 1999	-	3rd	11	8	3	26	14	Squad
(Japan) 2003	-	2nd	11	9	2	29	8	Squad
(Japan) 2007	Did not qualify							
(Japan) 2011	-	4th	11	8	3	28	15	Squad
(Japan) 2015	-	2nd	11	10	1	30	8	Squad
(Japan) 2019	-	7th	11	5	6	14	19	Squad
Total	1 title	8/14	80	58	22	189	90	-

- (Japan) 1995 — Gold medal

=== World Grand Champions Cup ===
Champions Runners up Third place Fourth place

World Grand Champions Cup record (Defunct)
Year	Round	Position	GP	MW	ML	SW	SL	Squad
(Japan) 1993	-	1st	5	5	0	15	4	Squad
(Japan) 1997	Did not qualify							
(Japan) 2001	Did not qualify							
(Japan) 2005	-	3rd	5	3	2	11	6	Squad
(Japan) 2009	Did not qualify							
(Japan) 2013	-	3rd	5	2	3	12	10	Squad
(Japan) 2017	-	2nd	5	4	1	14	8	Squad
Total	1 title	4/7	20	14	6	52	28	-

- (Japan) 1993 — Gold medal
  Bracci, Galli, Gardini, Giani, Gravina, Zorzi, Cantagalli, Bellini, Pippi, Pasinato, Bernardi. Head Coach: Velasco

=== World League ===
Champions Runners up Third place Fourth place

World League record (Defunct)
Year	Round	Position	GP	MW	ML	SW	SL	Squad
(Japan) 1990	Final	1st	14	11	3	37	21	Squad
(Italy) 1991	Final	1st	18	16	2	52	16	Squad
(Italy) 1992	Final	1st	18	16	2	50	17	Squad
(Brazil) 1993	Semifinals	3rd	22	20	2	62	17	Squad
(Italy) 1994	Final	1st	16	12	4	38	19	Squad
(Brazil) 1995	Final	1st	17	14	3	45	19	Squad
(Netherlands) 1996	Final	2nd	17	14	3	45	19	Squad
(Russia) 1997	Final	1st	17	14	3	47	17	Squad
(Italy) 1998	Final Round	4th	15	7	8	27	26	Squad
(Argentina) 1999	Final	1st	16	12	4	42	20	Squad
(Netherlands) 2000	Final	1st	18	13	5	44	33	Squad
(Poland) 2001	Final	2nd	17	12	5	41	24	Squad
(Brazil) 2002	Semifinals	4th	17	14	3	44	19	Squad
(Spain) 2003	Semifinals	3rd	17	10	7	37	27	Squad
(Italy) 2004	Final	2nd	15	9	6	34	22	Squad
(Serbia and Montenegro) 2005	1st round	7th	12	6	6	22	26	Squad
(Russia) 2006	2nd round	6th	16	7	9	32	31	Squad
(Poland) 2007	1st round	9th	12	4	8	19	30	Squad
(Brazil) 2008	1st round	7th	12	8	4	30	22	Squad
(Serbia) 2009	1st round	7th	12	8	4	27	17	Squad
(Argentina) 2010	2nd round	6th	14	9	5	35	21	Squad
(Poland) 2011	2nd round	6th	15	11	4	35	18	Squad
(Poland) 2012	1st round	11th	12	5	7	23	28	Squad
(Argentina) 2013	Semifinals	3rd	14	10	4	35	23	Squad
(Italy) 2014	Semifinals	3rd	16	9	7	33	25	Squad
(Brazil) 2015	2nd round	5th	14	7	7	26	31	Squad
(Poland) 2016	Semifinals	4th	13	7	6	25	20	Squad
(Brazil) 2017	1st round	12th	9	2	7	13	23	Squad
Total	8 titles	28/28	425	287	138	1000	631	-

- (Japan) 1990 Osaka — Gold medal
  Gardini, Margutti, De Giorgi, Tofoli, Masciarelli, Anastasi, Bracci, Bernardi, Cantagalli, Zorzi, Lucchetta, Giazzoli, Pasinato, Petrelli, Martinelli, Loro, Gallia. Head coach: Velasco
- (Italy) 1991 Milan — Gold medal
  Gardini, Martinelli, Margutti, De Giorgi, Tofoli, Masciarelli, Anastasi, Bracci, Bernardi, Cantagalli, Zorzi, Lucchetta, Giazzoli, Pasinato, Petrelli, Lombardi, Gallia, Galli, Gravina. Head coach: Velasco
- (Italy) 1992 Genoa — Gold medal
  Gardini, Martinelli, Margutti, De Giorgi, Tofoli, Masciarelli, Galli, Bracci, Bernardi, Cantagalli, Zorzi, Lucchetta, Giani, Giazzoli, Pasinato. Head coach: Velasco
- (Italy) 1994 Milan — Gold medal
  Gardini, Martinelli, Gravina, De Giorgi, Tofoli, Papi, Sartoretti, Bracci, Bernardi, Cantagalli, Margutti, Pippi, Giani, Bellini, Pasinato, Rinaldi, Fangareggi, Giretto. Head coach: Velasco
- (Brazil) 1995 Rio de Janeiro — Gold medal
  Fangareggi, Rosalba, Gravina, De Giorgi, Botti, Papi, Sartoretti, Verniaghi, Giazzoli, Bonati, Radicioni, Pippi, Giani, Bellini, Pasinato, Bovolenta, Meoni, Giretto. Head coach: Velasco
- (Russia) 1997 Moscow — Gold medal
  Gardini, Meoni, Gravina, Bendani, Fangareggi, Papi, Giombini, Sartoretti, Casoli, Rosalba, Zlatanov, Pippi, Giani, Bovolenta, Bonati, Patriarca, Bellini. Head coach: de Freitas
- (Argentina) 1999 Mar del Plata — Gold medal
  Vermiglio, Meoni, Mastrangelo, Fei, Papi, Sartoretti, Casoli, Rosalba, Zlatanov, Corsano, Bellini, Bovolenta, Giombini, Molteni. Head coach: Anastasi
- (Netherlands) 2000 Rotterdam — Gold medal
  Gardini, Meoni, Gravina, Mastrangelo, Tofoli, Papi, Sartoretti, Bracci, Bernardi, Rosalba, Molteni, Corsano, Giani, Fei, Castellano, Bovolenta, Giombini, Vermiglio. Head coach: Anastasi

=== Nations League ===
Champions Runners up Third place Fourth place

Nations League record
Year	Round	Position	GP	MW	ML	SW	SL	Squad
(France) 2018	Preliminary round	8th	15	8	7	30	28	Squad
(United States) 2019	Preliminary round	8th	15	8	7	31	25	Squad
(Italy) 2020	Not held due to the COVID-19 pandemic							
(Italy) 2021	Preliminary round	10th	15	7	8	28	33	Squad
(Italy) 2022	Semifinals	4th	15	11	4	35	16	Squad
(Poland) 2023	Semifinals	4th	15	10	5	33	21	Squad
(Poland) 2024	Quarterfinals	5th	13	9	4	31	17	Squad
(China) 2025	Final	2nd	15	12	3	39	19	Squad
(China) 2026	Quarterfinals	5th	13	8	5	30	21	Squad
(China) 2027	TBD	TBD	TBD	TBD	TBD	TBD	TBD	Squad
Total	0 titles	8/8	116	73	43	257	180	–

=== European Championship ===
Champions Runners up Third place Fourth place

European Championship record
Year	Round	Position	GP	MW	ML	SW	SL	Squad
(Italy) 1948	Round robin	Third place	5	3	2	11	6	Squad
(Bulgaria) 1950	Did not qualify							
(France) 1951	1st round	8th	5	2	3	8	9	Squad
(Romania) 1955	1st round	9th	7	5	2	15	8	Squad
(Czech Republic) 1958	1st round	10th	11	8	3	26	19	Squad
(Romania) 1963	1st round	10th	11	8	3	24	15	Squad
(Turkey) 1967	Final Round	8th	10	3	7	11	25	Squad
(Italy) 1971	1st round	8th	8	6	2	21	10	Squad
(Socialist Federal Republic of Yugoslavia) 1975	1st round	10th	7	2	5	8	17	Squad
(Finland) 1977	1st round	8th	7	3	4	12	16	Squad
(France) 1979	Final Round	5th	7	3	4	13	14	Squad
(Bulgaria) 1981	1st round	7th	7	5	2	15	9	Squad
(East Germany) 1983	Final Round	Fourth place	7	4	3	16	16	Squad
(Netherlands) 1985	Final Round	6th	7	1	6	10	18	Squad
(Belgium) 1987	1st round	9th	7	3	4	14	14	Squad
(Sweden) 1989	Final	Champions	7	6	1	20	7	Squad
(Germany) 1991	Final	Runners-up	7	6	1	18	7	Squad
(Finland) 1993	Final	Champions	7	7	0	21	5	Squad
(Greece) 1995	Final	Champions	7	6	1	19	6	Squad
(Netherlands) 1997	Semifinals	Third place	7	5	2	15	8	Squad
(Austria) 1999	Final	Champions	5	4	1	13	5	Squad
(Czech Republic) 2001	Final	Runners-up	7	4	3	14	10	Squad
(Austria) 2003	Final	Champions	7	7	0	21	4	Squad
(Italy) 2005	Final	Champions	7	6	1	19	8	Squad
(Russia) 2007	2nd round	6th	6	4	2	14	11	Squad
(Turkey) 2009	2nd round	10th	6	2	4	8	12	Squad
(Austria) (Czech Republic) 2011	Final	Runners-up	6	4	2	15	8	Squad
(Denmark) (Poland) 2013	Final	Runners-up	6	4	2	15	9	Squad
(Italy) (Bulgaria) 2015	Semifinals	Third place	7	5	2	18	7	Squad
(Poland) 2017	Quarterfinals	5th	5	3	2	11	6	Squad
(France) (Slovenia) (Belgium) (Netherlands) 2019	Quarterfinals	6th	7	5	2	16	9	Squad
(Poland) (Czech Republic) (Estonia) (Finland) 2021	Final	Champions	9	9	0	27	5	Squad
(Italy) (Bulgaria) (North Macedonia) (Israel) 2023	Final	Runners-up	9	8	1	24	7	Squad
(Bulgaria) (Finland) (Italy) (Romania) 2026	Quarterfinals	5th	7	6	1	20	7	Squad
(Montenegro) 2028	To be determined							
Total	7 titles	31/33	228	151	77	430	330	-

- (Sweden) 1989 — Gold medal
  Anastasi, Bernardi, Bracci, Cantagalli, De Giorgi, Gardini, Lucchetta, Margutti, Masciarelli, Passani, Tofoli, Zorzi. Head Coach: Velasco
- (Finland) 1993 — Gold medal
  Bellini, Bracci, Cantagalli, Galli, Gardini, Giani, Gravina, Martinelli, Pasinato, Pippi, Tofoli, Zorzi. Head Coach: Velasco
- (Greece) 1995 — Gold medal
  Bernardi, Bovolenta, Bracci, Cantagalli, Gardini, Giani, Gravina, Meoni, Papi, Pasinato, Tofoli, Andrea Zorzi. Head Coach: Velasco
- (Austria) 1999 — Gold medal
  Bracci, Corsano, Gardini, Giani, Giombini, Gravina, Meoni, Mastrangelo, Papi, Rosalba, Sartoretti, Tofoli. Head Coach: Anastasi
- (Germany) 2003 — Gold medal
  Biribanti, Černič, Cozzi, Fei, Giani, Mastrangelo, Meoni, Papi, Pippi, Sartoretti, Savani, Vermiglio. Head Coach: Montali
- (Italy) (Serbia and Montenegro) 2005 — Gold medal
  Černič, Cisolla, Corsano, Cozzi, Fei, Łasko, Mastrangelo, Paparoni, Savani, Sintini, Tencati, Vermiglio. Head Coach: Montali
- (Poland) (Czech Republic) (Estonia) (Finland) 2021 — Gold medal
  Anzani, Balaso, Bottolo, Cortesia, Galassi, Giannelli, Lavia, Michieletto, Piccinelli, Pinali, Ricci, Recine, Romanò, Sbertoli. Head Coach: De Giorgi

=== European Games ===
Champions Runners up Third place Fourth place

European Games record
Year	Round	Position	GP	MW	ML	SW	SL	Squad
(Azerbaijan) 2015 Baku	1st round	11th	5	0	5	4	15	Squad
(Belarus) 2019 Minsk	volleyball tournament not held							
(Poland) 2023 Kraków	volleyball tournament not held							
(Turkey) 2027 Istanbul	TBD							
Total	0 titles	1/1	5	0	5	4	15	-

=== Mediterranean Games ===
- 1959 — (gold) gold medal
- 1963 — (silver) silver medal
- 1975 — (silver) silver medal
- 1979 — Fourth place
- 1983 — (gold) gold medal
- 1987 — (bronze) bronze medal
- 1991 — (gold) gold medal
- 1997 — Fourth place
- 2001 — (gold) gold medal
- 2005 — Fifth place
- 2009 — (gold) gold medal
- 2013 — (gold) gold medal
- 2018 — (gold) gold medal
- 2022 — (bronze) bronze medal
- 2026 — (bronze) bronze medal
- 2030 — Future event

=== Goodwill Games ===
Champions Runners up Third place Fourth place

Goodwill Games record
Year	Round	Position	GP	MW	ML	SW	SL
(Soviet Union) 1986	Did not participate						
(United States) 1990	Final	Champions	5	4	1	14	6
Total	1 titles	1/2	5	4	1	14	6

- (United States) 1990 — (gold) Gold medal

== Team ==
=== Current roster ===
Roster for the 2026 Volleyball Nations League.

No.	Pos.	Player	Date of birth (age)	Caps	Club
1		Tim Held	17 April 1998 (age 28)	{{{caps}}}	(Italy) Sonepar Padova
		Giulio Magalini	14 August 2001 (age 25)	{{{caps}}}	(Italy) Yuasa Battery Grottazzolina
5		Alessandro Michieletto	5 December 2001 (age 24)	{{{caps}}}	(Italy) Itas Trentino
9		Francesco Sani	16 July 2002 (age 24)	{{{caps}}}	(Italy) Rana Verona
12		Mattia Bottolo	3 January 2001 (age 25)	{{{caps}}}	(Italy) Cucine Lube Civitanova
15		Daniele Lavia	4 November 1999 (age 27)	{{{caps}}}	(Italy) Itas Trentino
17		Luca Porro	9 May 2004 (age 22)	{{{caps}}}	(Italy) Valsa Group Modena
		Tommaso Ichino	5 December 2001 (age 24)	{{{caps}}}	(Italy) Powervolley Milano
24		Mattia Orioli	23 March 2004 (age 22)	{{{caps}}}	(Italy) Sonepar Padova
		Francesco Comparoni	22 June 2001 (age 25)	{{{caps}}}	(Italy) Gas Sales Piacenza
13		Lorenzo Cortesia	26 September 1999 (age 27)	{{{caps}}}	(Italy) Rana Verona
14		Gianluca Galassi	24 July 1997 (age 29)	{{{caps}}}	(Italy) Gas Sales Piacenza
18		Giovanni Sanguinetti	14 April 2000 (age 26)	{{{caps}}}	(Italy) Valsa Group Modena
19		Roberto Russo	23 February 1997 (age 29)	{{{caps}}}	(Italy) Sir Safety Perugia
20		Pardo Mati	7 August 2006 (age 20)	{{{caps}}}	(Italy) Valsa Group Modena
		Andrea Truocchio	10 February 2000 (age 26)	{{{caps}}}	(Italy) Sonepar Padova
25		Giovanni Gargiulo	3 June 1999 (age 27)	{{{caps}}}	(Italy) Cucine Lube Civitanova
30		Leandro Mosca	5 September 2000 (age 26)	{{{caps}}}	(Italy) Cuneo Volley
2		Paolo Porro	27 October 2001 (age 25)	{{{caps}}}	(Italy) Gas Sales Piacenza
6		Simone Giannelli (C)	9 August 1996 (age 30)	{{{caps}}}	(Italy) Sir Safety Perugia
9		Riccardo Sbertoli	23 May 1998 (age 28)	{{{caps}}}	(Italy) Itas Trentino
26		Mattia Boninfante	24 June 2004 (age 22)	{{{caps}}}	(Russia) Zenit St. Petersburg
4		Gabriele Laurenzano	12 June 2003 (age 23)	{{{caps}}}	(Italy) Itas Trentino
7		Fabio Balaso	20 October 1995 (age 31)	{{{caps}}}	(Italy) Cucine Lube Civitanova
		Matteo Staforini	25 May 2003 (age 23)	{{{caps}}}	(Italy) Rana Verona
28		Domenico Pace	2 October 2000 (age 26)	{{{caps}}}	(Italy) Gas Sales Piacenza
11		Kamil Rychlicki	1 November 1996 (age 30)	{{{caps}}}	(Poland) ZAKSA Kędzierzyn-Koźle
16		Yuri Romano	26 July 1997 (age 29)	{{{caps}}}	(Poland) PGE Projekt Warszawa
23		Alessandro Bovolenta	27 May 2004 (age 22)	{{{caps}}}	(Italy) Gas Sales Piacenza
		Tommaso Guzzo	30 April 2002 (age 24)	{{{caps}}}	(Italy) Cisterna Volley

=== Coach history ===
- Pietro Bernardi (1947)
- Angelo Costa (1947-1949)
- Renzo Del Chicca (1949-1953)
- Ivan Trinajstic (1953-1966)
- Josef Kozak (1966-1969)
- Odone Federzoni (1969-1974)
- Odone Federzoni & Josef Kozak (1970)
- Franco Anderlini (1974-1976)
- Adriano Pavlica (1976-1977)
- Edward Skorek (1978 ad interim)
- Carmelo Pittera (1978-1982 + 1988)
- Nino Cuco (1981 ad interim)
- Silvano Prandi (1983-1986)
- Aleksander Skiba (1987)
- Michelangelo Lo Bianco (1988 ad interim)
- Julio Velasco (1988-1996)
- Angelo Frigoni (1990-1991 ad interim - World League)
- Daniele Bagnoli (1992 ad interim - World League)
- Paulo Roberto de Freitas (1996-1998)
- Andrea Anastasi (1998-2002)
- Kim Ho-Chul (2001)
- Gian Paolo Montali (2002-2007)
- Andrea Anastasi (2007-2010)
- Mauro Berruto (2010-2015)
- Gianlorenzo Blengini (2015-2021)
- Antonio Valentini (2021 - Volley Nations League)
- Ferdinando De Giorgi (2021-)

== Record attendance ==
- Table updated to August 12, 2012.

#	Player	Appearances
1	Andrea Giani	474
2	Andrea Gardini	418
3	Luigi Mastrangelo	363
4	Samuele Papi	361
5	Marco Bracci	347
6	Paolo Tofoli	342
7	Luca Cantagalli	330
8	Ferdinando De Giorgi	330
9	Andrea Sartoretti	330
10	Andrea Zorzi	325

== Kit providers ==
The table below shows the history of kit providers for the Italy national volleyball team.

Period	Kit provider
2000–2008	Nike; Asics
2008–2021	Asics; Armani; Errea

=== Sponsorship ===
Primary sponsors include: main sponsors like DHL, Kinder (Ferrero SpA), Honda and Mizuno, other sponsors: Santal, Diadora, EthicSport, Reaxing, Crai, Nutrilite, Uliveto and Winform.

== Media ==
Italy's matches and friendlies are currently televised by RAI and Rai Sport.
