= Andrea Zorzi =

Italian volleyball player

Personal information
- Full name: Andrea Zorzi
- Nickname: Zorro
- Born: 29 July 1965 (age 61); Noale, Province of Venice, Italy
- Height: 201 cm (6 ft 7 in)

Volleyball information
- Position: Opposite
- Number: 11

National team
1986–1996	Italy
Honours
Men's volleyball
Representing Italy
Olympic Games
Silver medal – second place	1996 Atlanta	Team
World Championship
Gold medal – first place	1990 Brazil	Team
Gold medal – first place	1994 Greece	Team
FIVB World Cup
Gold medal – first place	1995 Japan
Silver medal – second place	1989 Japan
World Grand Champions Cup
Gold medal – first place	1993 Japan
FIVB World League
Gold medal – first place	1990 Osaka
Gold medal – first place	1991 Milan
Gold medal – first place	1992 Genoa
Silver medal – second place	1996 Rotterdam
Bronze medal – third place	1993 São Paulo
Goodwill Games
Gold medal – first place	1990 Seattle
European Championship
Gold medal – first place	1989 Sweden
Gold medal – first place	1993 Finland
Gold medal – first place	1995 Greece
Silver medal – second place	1991 Germany

Andrea Zorzi (born 29 July 1965) is an Italian former volleyball player, won two World Championships with the Italy men's national volleyball team (1990 and 1994). A 201 cm athlete, Zorzi was an effective spiker who played as an opposite hitter. He was popularly known as "Zorro". In 1991, he was declared World's Best Player by the FIVB. In 2024, Zorzi was inducted into the International Volleyball Hall of Fame.

== National team ==
Zorzi was the 1990 FIVB World League MVP after helping Italy win the gold medal, and was at one point reputedly the world's highest paid volleyball player. He was instrumental in Italy winning the gold medal at the 1990 Goodwill Games in Seattle.

Zorzi won gold medals with the Italian team at the 1990 FIVB World Championship in Brazil and the 1994 FIVB World Championship in Greece.

Zorzi was a silver medalist at the 1996 Summer Olympics in Atlanta, and also competed at the 1988 Summer Olympics in Seoul and 1992 Summer Olympics in Barcelona.

In the European Championship, Zorzi won gold medals while representing Italy in 1989, 1993, and 1995, and won a silver medal in 1991.

== Club volleyball ==
Playing for almost all the major volleyball clubs of Italy, including Maxicono Parma and Sisley Treviso, Zorzi won several titles: these include two Italian Championships (1990, 1996) and one European Champions League in 1995.

== Clubs ==
Club	Country	From	To
Padua	Italy	1982–1983	1984–1985
Parma	Italy	1985–1986	1989–1990
Milan	Italy	1990–1991	1993–1994
Sisley Treviso	Italy	1994–1995	1995–1996
Macerata	Italy	1996–1997	1997–1998

== Individual awards ==
- 1990 FIVB World League "Most Valuable Player"
- 1991 FIVB World League "Most Valuable Player"
- 1992 FIVB World League "Best Server"
- 2024 International Volleyball Hall of Fame
