= 1993 Men's European Volleyball Championship =

Tournament details
- Host country: Finland
- Dates: September 4–12
- Teams: 12
- Venues: 2 (in 2 host cities)

Final positions
- Champions: Italy (2nd title)

The 1993 Men's European Volleyball Championship was the 18th edition of the event, organized by Europe's governing volleyball body, the Confédération Européenne de Volleyball. It was hosted in Oulu and Turku, Finland from September 4 to September 12, 1993.

== Teams ==
Group A – Oulu

- Bulgaria
- Czechoslovakia*
- France
- Italy
- Netherlands
- Sweden

Group B – Turku

- Finland
- Germany
- Poland
- Russia
- Spain
- Ukraine

*Note: Although the Czech Republic and Slovakia became separate countries in 1993, the Czechoslovakia Volleyball Federation (ČSFV) was not yet separate, therefore the team competed as Czechoslovakia (officially as Czech Republic + Slovak Republic).

== Preliminary round ==
The preliminary round of the 1993 Men's European Volleyball Championship featured two groups (Group A and Group B), with each group consisting of six teams. The teams competed in a round-robin format, with the top teams from each group advancing to the final round.

Teams played against each other within their groups, and the results of these matches determined which teams advanced to the final round. The top four teams from each group moved on to compete in the quarterfinals.

== Final round ==
Semi-finals
1993-09-11 – Turku
Italy	3
Germany	0
1993-09-11 – Turku
Netherlands	3
Russia	0

Final
1993-09-12 – Turku
Italy	3
Netherlands	2
3rd place
1993-09-12 – Turku
Germany	1
Russia	3

5-8th place
1993-09-11 – Turku
Bulgaria	3
Poland	1
1993-09-11 – Turku
Ukraine	3
Czechoslovakia	0

5th place
1993-09-12 – Turku
Bulgaria	3
Ukraine	2
7th place
1993-09-12 – Turku
Poland	3
Czechoslovakia	1

== Final ranking ==
Place	Team
1st place, gold medalist(s)	Italy
2nd place, silver medalist(s)	Netherlands
3rd place, bronze medalist(s)	Russia
4.	Germany
5.	Bulgaria
6.	Ukraine
7.	Poland
8.	Czechoslovakia
9.	France
10.	Finland
11.	Spain
11.	Sweden

1993 Men's European champions

Italy
Second title

Team Roster
Davide Bellini, Marco Bracci, Luca Cantagalli, Claudio Galli, Andrea Gardini, Andrea Giani, Pasquale Gravina, Marco Martinelli, Michele Pasinato, Damiano Pippi, Paolo Tofoli, and Andrea Zorzi.
Head coach: Julio Velasco.
