= Pasinato =

Pasinato is an Italian surname. Notable people with the surname include:

- Giancarlo Pasinato (born 1956), Italian footballer and manager
- Mateus Pasinato (born 1992), Brazilian footballer
- Michele Pasinato (1969–2021), Italian volleyball player
