= Roberto Masciarelli =

Italian volleyball player (born 1963)

Personal information
- Born: 5 September 1963 (age 63); Ancona, Italy
- Height: 196 cm (6 ft 5 in)

Volleyball information
- Position: Middle blocker
- Number: 6

National team
| 1989–1993 | Italy |
Honours
Men's volleyball
Representing Italy
FIVB World Championship
| Gold medal – first place | 1990 Brazil | Team |
FIVB World Cup
| Silver medal – second place | 1989 Japan |
CEV European Championship
| Gold medal – first place | 1989 Sweden |
| Silver medal – second place | 1991 Germany |

Roberto Masciarelli (born 5 September 1963) is an Italian former volleyball player. He competed in the men's tournament at the 1992 Summer Olympics in Barcelona.
