= Pasquale Gravina =

Italian volleyball player

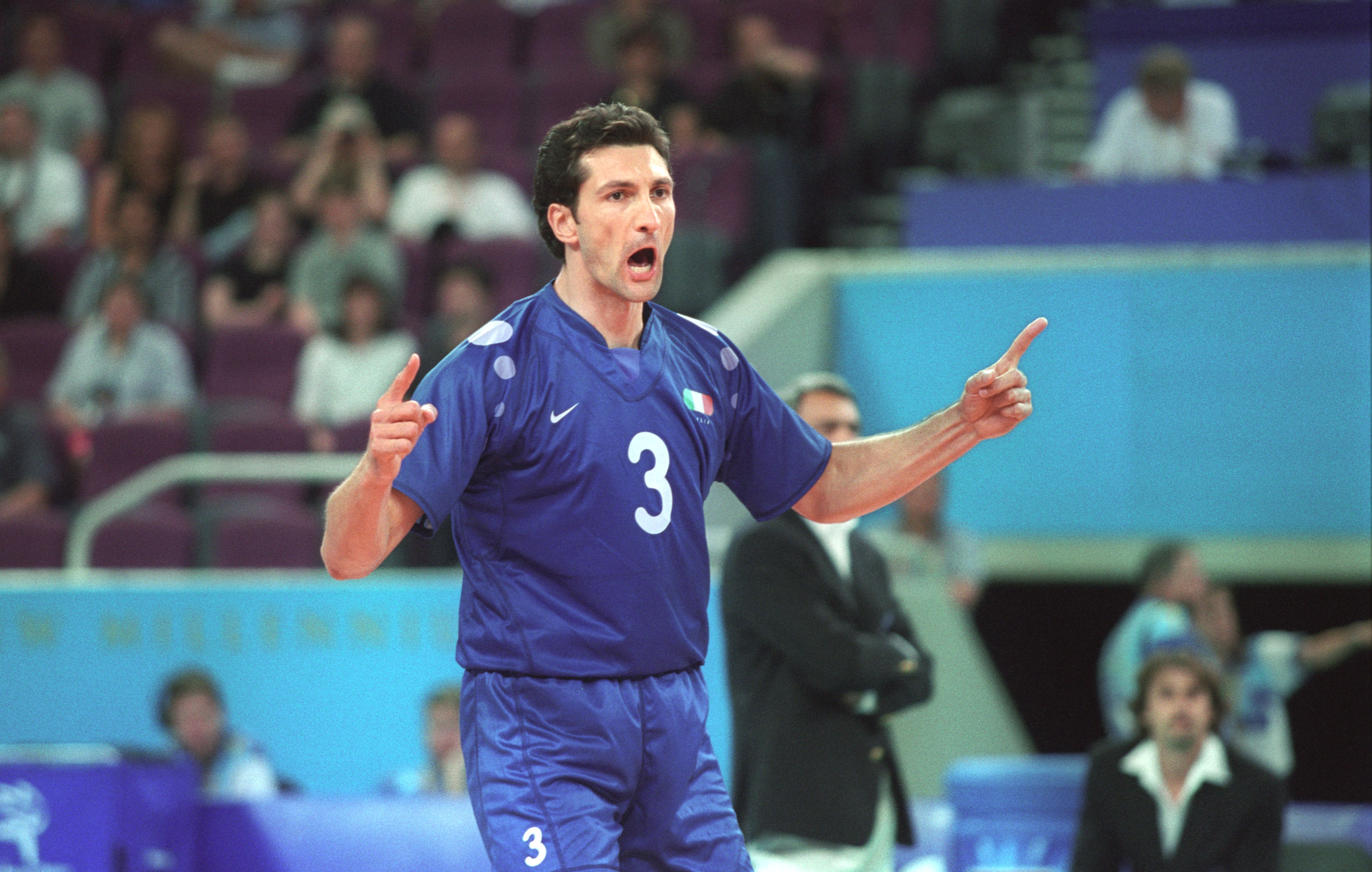

Personal information
- Full name: Pasquale Gravina
- Born: 1 May 1970 (age 56) Campobasso, Italy
- Height: 201 cm (6 ft 7 in)
- Weight: 102 kg (225 lb)

Sport
- Country: Italy
- Sport: Volleyball
Medal record
Men's volleyball
Representing Italy
Olympic Games
Silver medal – second place	1996 Atlanta	Team competition
Bronze medal – third place	2000 Sydney	Team competition
World Championship
Gold medal – first place	1994 Greece	Team competition
Gold medal – first place	1998 Japan	Team competition
European Championships
Gold medal – first place	1993 Turku	Team competition
Gold medal – first place	1995 Athens	Team competition
Gold medal – first place	1999 Wien	Team competition
Bronze medal – third place	1997 Eindhoven	Team competition
World League
Gold medal – first place	1994 Milano	Team competition
Gold medal – first place	1995 Rio de Janeiro	Team competition
Gold medal – first place	1997 Moscow	Team competition
Gold medal – first place	2000 Rotterdam	Team competition
Silver medal – second place	1996 Rotterdam	Team competition
World Cup
Gold medal – first place	1995 Japan	Team competition
Grand Champions Cup
Gold medal – first place	1993 Tokyo	Team competition
Volleyball World Top Four
Gold medal – first place	1994 Osaka	Team competition
Volleyball World Super Six
Gold medal – first place	1996 Tokyo	Team competition
- Updated on 10 January 2012

Pasquale Gravina (born 1 May 1970) is a manager and a former Italian professional volleyball player.

== Athlete ==
Gravina is 201 cm and played as middle attacker. After some experiences for minor leagues, he made his debut in the Italian Volleyball League first division in 1988, for Falconara. His qualities, especially in block actions, made him a choice for a top team: Maxicono Parma in 1990. In this club he won the scudetto in 1992 and 1993. Later he played from 1996 until 2001 for Sisley Volley where he won the national title three times more. Then he played for Lube Volley in which he won the Champions League in 2002 and the Italian Cup in 2003. After one year playing for Cuneo, he returned in 2005 to Sisley Volley where he won the last Italian title and Cup before his retiring. He achieved a total of 20 titles.

Gravina played 284 times for the Italian National Team, for which he made his debut in 1990 at San Diego against the US Team. He won gold medal in 1994 and 1998 at Volleyball World Championship, and gold medal in 1993, 1995 and 1999 at Volleyball European Championship, plus four Volleyball World League and several other prestigious victories for a total of 13 titles. He was silver medal at 1996 Summer Olympics and bronze medal at 2000 Sydney Olympics.

== Sports Manager ==
When in 2005 Gravina has stopped the activity as an athlete, he began to play the role of sports agent who served until 2009. At the same time, he also began working with several companies, developing training courses and presentations using the sporting experience translated into business dynamics and founding his personal website pasqualegravina.com.

He became in April 2009 the General Manager of Sisley Treviso and, after one year, he became CEO. In 2012, the last year before the step back from the ownership of the club the Benetton Group, he won the European CEV Cup.

He became in 2012 President of the Volley Treviso, a club that has inherited the titles of dissolved Sisley Volley providing for youth education and training.

== Manager ==
In September 2015 he decided for a new challenge in a different field of work and, until the end of 2016, is the CEO of Trenkwalder Training, a company belonging to the Trenkwalder Group, which plans, organizes and executes individual, sectorial and company training sessions.

In January 2017 he became Strategic Selling Director of Gi Group Holding, one of the world's leading companies providing services for the development of the labour market.

In 2024 he changed role within the Group to become Leadership & Training Advisor of Tack TMI, the Global Learning and Development Solution company.

== Clubs ==
Club	Country	From	To
Falconara	Italy	1988–1989	1989–1990
Parma	Italy	1990–1991	1995–1996
Treviso	Italy	1996–1997	2000–2001
Macerata	Italy	2001–2002	2002–2003
Cuneo	Italy	2003–2004	2003–2004
Treviso	Italy	2004–2005	2004–2005

== Wins ==
=== Club ===
- 6 Italian Championships (1992, 1993, 1998, 1999, 2001, 2005)
- 4 Italian Cups (1992, 2000, 2003, 2005)
- 3 European Champions League (1999, 2000, 2001)
- 4 Cev Cups (1992, 1995, 1998, 2012)
- 3 Italian Supercup (1998, 2000, 2004)
- 1 European Supercup (1999)
- 1 Italian beach volleyball Championship (1992)

=== National team ===
- 2 World Championships (1994, 1998)
- 3 European Championships (1993, 1995, 1999)
- 4 World League (1994, 1995, 1997, 2000)
- 1 Grand Champions Cup (1993)
- 1 World Super Four (1994)
- 1 World Super Six (1996)
- 1 World Cup (1995)

==== Olympics ====
- 1 Silver Atlanta 1996
- 1 Bronze Sidney 2000

== Honors ==
- Order of Merit of the Italian Republic, Rome, July 25 2000. Given by the President of the Italian Republic.
- Golden Collar for Sporting Merit, Rome, 1998.
