= Gian Paolo Montali =

Italian volleyball coach (born 1960)

Gian Paolo Montali (born 18 January 1960 in Traversetolo, province of Parma) is an Italian volleyball coach who has won two Volleyball European Championships with Italian national team.

Montali began his career as volleyball coach for the junior team of the Santal Parma (Calisto Tanzi's club). From 1986 to 1990 he directed the senior team, winning a striking scudetto in the latter season (together with 3 European Cup Winner's Cups and two Italian Cups).

After a short parenthesis in the secondary Schio's team, Montali was called to lead Sisley Treviso, property of the Benetton family, which had till then scored little success despite strong financial investments. Montali imposed his capabilities and his discipline of work in his new seat also, winning 2 national titles, 1 European Winners', another European Cup Winner's, 1 CEV and one Italian Cups. In 1996 he was appointed head coach of the Greek powerhouse Olympiacos Piraeus, and coached the club to the Greek Championship in 1997–1998 and two Greek Cups (1996-1997, 1997-1998).

It is hard for Montali to arrive somewhere without winning. In 1998 he was attracted by another ambitious project: to take the reins of the newly formed team of Rome, deploying famous but aging champions like Andrea Gardini or Marco Bracci, and try to win something after a devoid of victories lasting twenty years. In 2000, in Palaeur in Rome beating any record of crowding for Italian volleyball, Montali's men won its scudetto defeating Andrea Giani's Las Daytona Modena. This victory has been largely credited to Montali's skills in tactics and team-moulding.

His capabilities to lead unfavoured teams to achieve considerable success were confirmed in his lead of Asystel Milano, a second-row team who anyway reached the final for Italian title in 2001.

With such a career at his back, Montali was judged the right person to revamp the fate of Italy's volleyball national team, which seemed to be in crisis after many of the champions of 1990s's successes had retired. In his first season (2003) Montali led his inexperienced men to a bronze medal in the World League and, most of all, to a surprising success in the European Championship. One year later Montali's team was silver medal in the World League and in the Olympic Games, both behind Brazil: under the new coach Italy had anyway imposed again his role as one of the strongest teams in the world.

In 2005 Italy confirmed as Europe's leading, winning a gold in the final against a physically superior Russia. The team and the coach received awards for their role in maintaining high interest in volleyball in their country at the Palazzo del Quirinale from the Italian President Carlo Azeglio Ciampi.

Montali has a son, Alessandro.
