= 1995 Men's European Volleyball Championship =

Tournament details
- Host country: Greece
- Dates: September 8–16
- Teams: 12
- Venues: 2 (in 2 host cities)

Final positions
- Champions: Italy (3rd title)

The 1995 Men's European Volleyball Championship was the nineteenth edition of the event, organized by Europe's governing volleyball body, the Confédération Européenne de Volleyball. It was hosted in two cities in Greece, in Piraeus and Patras, from September 8 to September 16, 1995. The games in Piraeus were held at Peace and Friendship Stadium, whilst in Patras at Dimitrios Tofalos Indoor Hall.

== Teams ==
Group A – Piraeus, Peace and Friendship Stadium

- Germany
- Greece
- Latvia
- Netherlands
- Ukraine
- Yugoslavia

Group B – Patras, Dimitrios Tofalos Indoor Hall

- Bulgaria
- Czech Republic
- Italy
- Poland
- Romania
- Russia

== Final round ==
Semi-finals
1995-09-15 – Piraeus
Italy	3
Yugoslavia	1
1995-09-15 – Piraeus
Netherlands	3
Bulgaria	0

Final
1995-09-16 – Piraeus
Italy	3
Netherlands	2
3rd place
1995-09-16 – Piraeus
Yugoslavia	3
Bulgaria	0

5-8th place
1995-09-15 – Piraeus
Germany	0
Russia	3
1995-09-15 – Piraeus
Poland	3
Greece	0

5th place
1995-09-16 – Piraeus
Poland	0
Russia	3
7th place
1995-09-16 – Piraeus
Greece	3
Germany	2

== Final ranking ==
Place	Team
1st place, gold medalist(s)	Italy
2nd place, silver medalist(s)	Netherlands
3rd place, bronze medalist(s)	Yugoslavia
4.	Bulgaria
5.	Russia
6.	Poland
7.	Greece
8.	Germany
9.	Ukraine
10.	Czech Republic
11.	Latvia
12.	Romania

1995 Men's European champions

Italy
Third title

Team Roster
Lorenzo Bernardi, Vigor Bovolenta, Marco Bracci, Luca Cantagalli, Andrea Gardini, Andrea Giani, Pasquale Gravina, Marco Meoni, Samuele Papi, Michele Pasinato, Paolo Tofoli, and Andrea Zorzi.
Head coach: Julio Velasco.
