= Vigor Bovolenta =

Italian volleyball player (1974–2012)

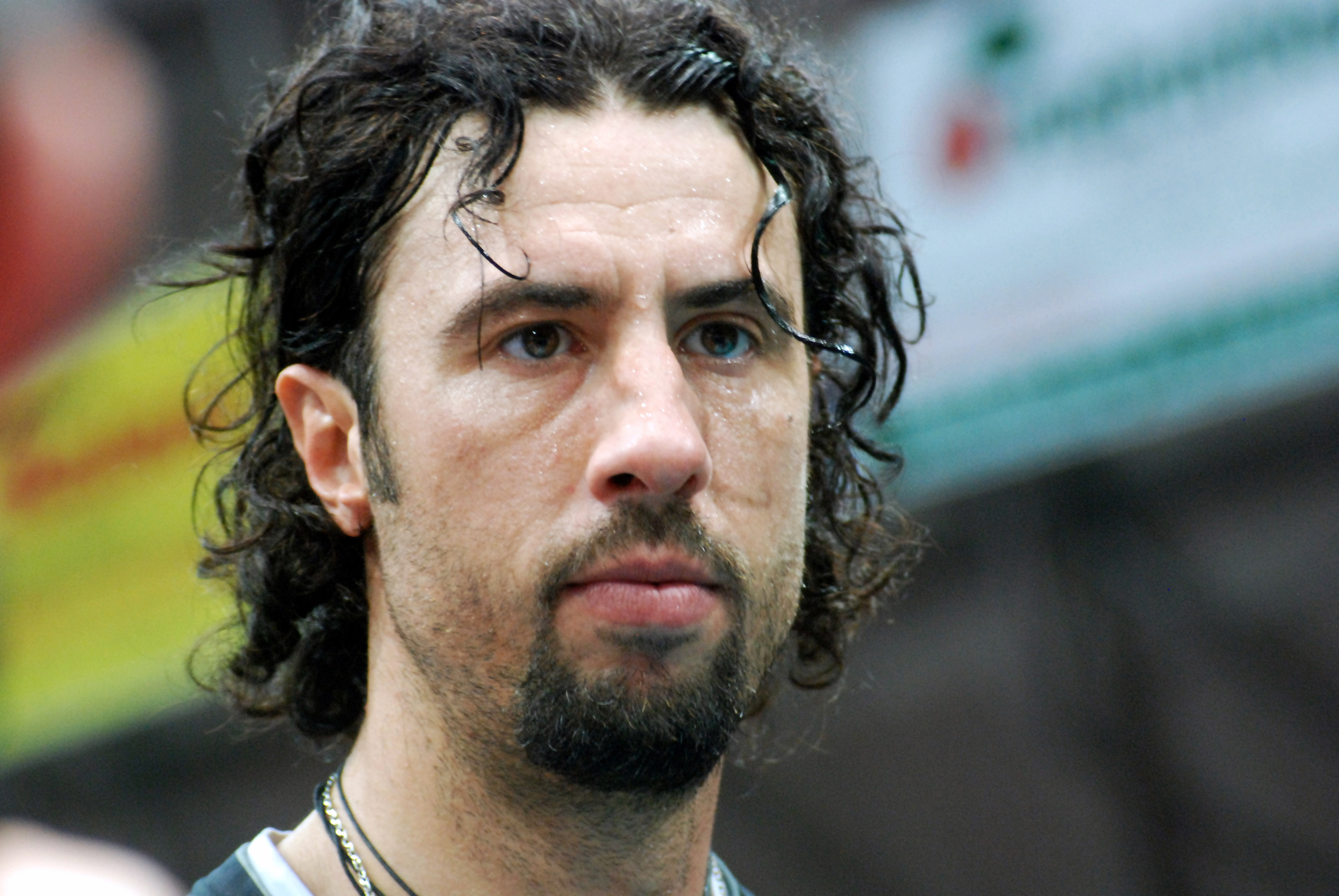
- Bovolenta in 2008

Personal information
- Nationality: Italian
- Born: 30 May 1974; Rovigo, Italy
- Died: 24 March 2012 (aged 37); Macerata, Italy
- Height: 2.02 m (6 ft 8 in)
- Spike: 358 cm (141 in)
- Block: 345 cm (136 in)

Volleyball information
- Position: Middle blocker

Career
| Years | Teams |
|---|---|
| 1990–1997; 1997–1998; 1998–1999; 1999–2000; 2000–2003; 2003–2008; 2008–2010; 2010–2012 | Edilcuoghi Ravenna; 4Torri Ferrara Volley; Piaggio Roma; Iveco Palermo; Casa Modena; Copra Berni Piacenza; RPA LuigiBacchi.it Perugia; Volley Forlí |

National team
| 1995–2008 | Italy |
Honours
Men's volleyball
Representing Italy
Olympic Games
| Silver medal – second place | 1996 Atlanta | Team |
World Cup
| Gold medal – first place | 1995 Japan |
World League
| Gold medal – first place | 1995 Rio de Janeiro |
| Gold medal – first place | 1997 Moscow |
| Gold medal – first place | 1999 Mar del Plata |
| Gold medal – first place | 2000 Rotterdam |
European Championship
| Gold medal – first place | 1995 Greece |
| Silver medal – second place | 2001 Czech Republic |
- Last updated: 2 January 2018

Vigor Bovolenta (30 May 1974 – 24 March 2012) was a volleyball player from Italy. Bovolenta was part of the men's national team that won the gold medal at the 1995 European Championship in Greece and the silver medal at the 1996 Summer Olympics in Atlanta.

Bovolenta died at the age of 37 after suffering a heart attack during an Italian League fourth level game between his team, Forlì, and the reserve team of Macerata. He had severe coronary artery disease similar to Sergey Grinkov.

== See also ==
- List of sportspeople who died during their careers
