= Leondino Giombini =

Italian volleyball player (born 1975)

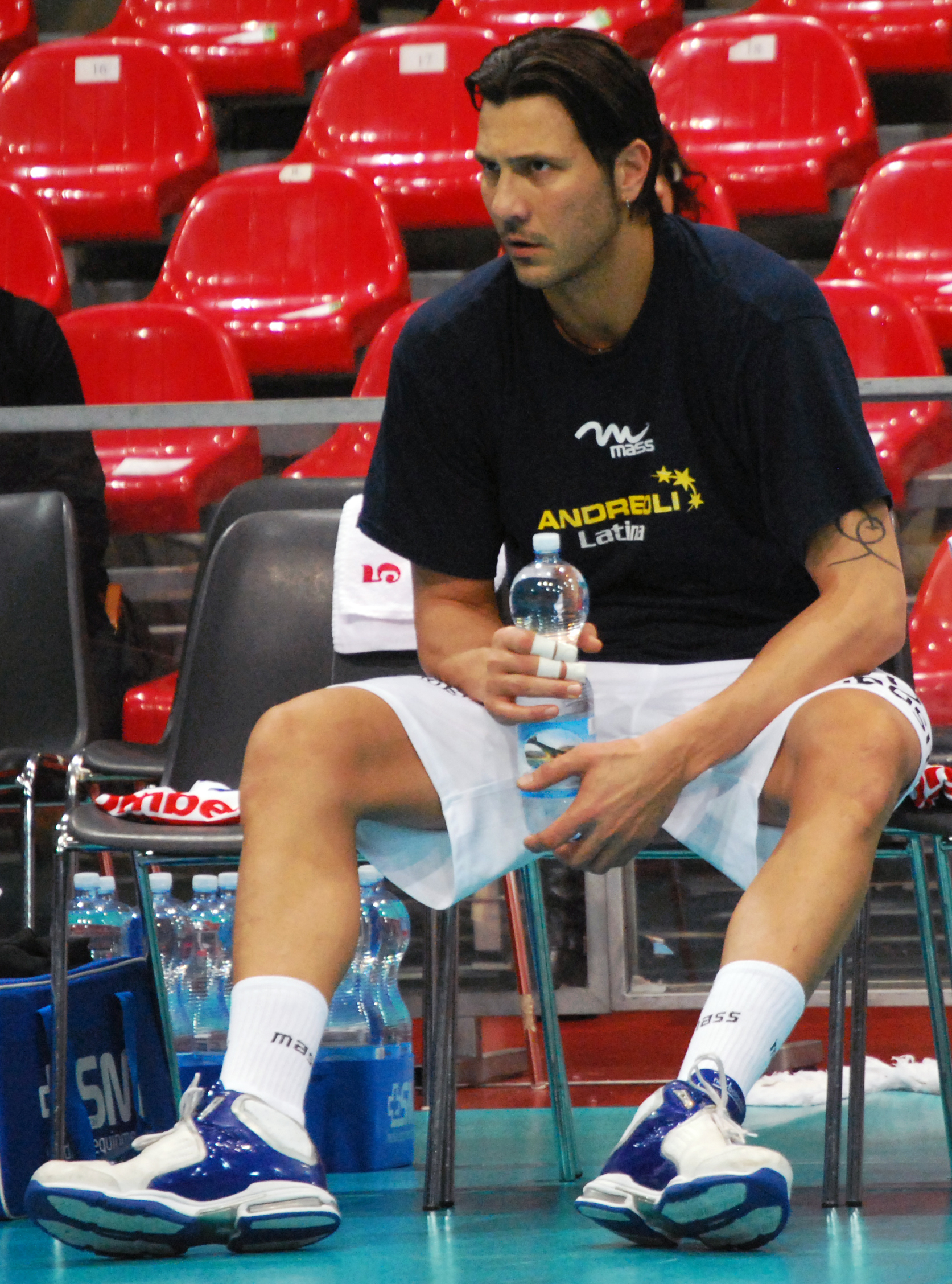
- at the Palabanca in Piacenza during the Copra-Latina match, 2010

Personal information
- Born: 30 January 1975 (age 51); Ancona, Italy
- Height: 204 cm (6 ft 8 in)
Honours
Men's volleyball
Representing Italy
European Championship
Gold medal – first place	1999 Vienna	Team
Silver medal – second place	2001 Ostrava	Team
Summer Universiade
Bronze medal – third place	1995 Fukuoka	Team

Leondino Giombini (born 30 January 1975) is a volleyball player from Italy, who won the gold medal with the Men's National Team at the 1999 European Championship in Vienna, Austria. He earned a total number of 134 caps for the Azzurri.
