= 1999 Men's European Volleyball Championship =

Tournament details
- Host country: Austria
- Dates: September 7–12
- Teams: 8
- Venues: 2 (in 2 host cities)

Final positions
- Champions: Italy (4th title)

The 1999 Men's European Volleyball Championship was the 21st edition of the event, organized by Europe's governing volleyball body, the Confédération Européenne de Volleyball. It was hosted in two cities in Austria – Wiener Neustadt and Vienna – from September 7 to September 12, 1999.

== Teams ==
Group A – Wiener Neustadt

- Czech Republic
- France
- Netherlands
- Yugoslavia

Group B – Vienna

- Austria
- Bulgaria
- Italy
- Russia

== Preliminary round ==
=== Group A ===
| | Team | Points | G | W | L | PW | PL | Ratio | SW | SL | Ratio |
|---|---|---|---|---|---|---|---|---|---|---|---|
| 1. | Yugoslavia | 5 | 3 | 2 | 1 | 288 | 247 | 1.166 | 7 | 5 | 1.400 |
| 2. | Czech Republic | 5 | 3 | 2 | 1 | 295 | 314 | 0.940 | 7 | 7 | 1.000 |
| 3. | France | 4 | 3 | 1 | 2 | 262 | 286 | 0.916 | 6 | 6 | 1.000 |
| 4. | Netherlands | 4 | 3 | 1 | 2 | 278 | 276 | 1.007 | 5 | 7 | 0.714 |

- Tuesday September 7

| Yugoslavia | 3 – 1 | Czech Republic | 25-20 • 25-14 • 24-26 • 25–22 |
| France | 3 – 0 | Netherlands | 26-24 • 27-25 • 30–28 |

- Wednesday September 8

| Czech Republic | 3 – 2 | Netherlands | 19-25 • 25-20 • 17-25 • 25-23 • 18–16 |
| Yugoslavia | 3 – 1 | France | 25-12 • 25-17 • 25-27 • 25–17 |

- Thursday September 9

| Czech Republic | 3 – 2 | France | 26-24 • 25-19 • 20-25 • 23-25 • 15–13 |
| Netherlands | 3 – 1 | Yugoslavia | 17-25 • 25-21 • 25-21 • 25–22 |

=== Group B ===
| | Team | Points | G | W | L | PW | PL | Ratio | SW | SL | Ratio |
|---|---|---|---|---|---|---|---|---|---|---|---|
| 1. | Russia | 6 | 3 | 3 | 0 | 266 | 216 | 1.232 | 9 | 2 | 4.500 |
| 2. | Italy | 5 | 3 | 2 | 1 | 233 | 209 | 1.115 | 7 | 3 | 2.333 |
| 3. | Bulgaria | 4 | 3 | 1 | 2 | 219 | 229 | 0.956 | 4 | 6 | 0.666 |
| 4. | Austria | 3 | 3 | 0 | 3 | 161 | 225 | 0.716 | 0 | 9 | 0.000 |

- Tuesday September 7

| Italy | 3 – 0 | Austria | 25-12 • 25-16 • 25–19 |
| Russia | 3 – 1 | Bulgaria | 27-25 • 17-25 • 25-13 • 25–16 |

- Wednesday September 8

| Italy | 3 – 0 | Bulgaria | 25-21 • 25-21 • 25–23 |
| Austria | 0 – 3 | Russia | 19-25 • 13-25 • 22–25 |

- Thursday September 9

| Bulgaria | 3 – 0 | Austria | 25-22 • 25-23 • 25–15 |
| Russia | 3 – 1 | Italy | 25-20 • 22-25 • 25-18 • 25–20 |

== Final round ==
Semi-finals
1999-09-11 – Vienna
Russia | 3
Czech Republic | 0
1999-09-11 – Vienna
Italy | 3
Yugoslavia | 1

Final
1999-09-12 – Vienna
Italy | 3
Russia | 1
3rd place
1999-09-12 – Vienna
Yugoslavia | 3
Czech Republic | 0

- Saturday September 11

| Russia | 3 – 0 | Czech Republic | 25-21 • 25-15 • 25–13 |
| Italy | 3 – 1 | Yugoslavia | 25-15 • 25-22 • 24-26 • 25–22 |

- Sunday September 12

| Czech Republic | 0 – 3 | Yugoslavia | 17-25 • 19-25 • 23–25 |
| Russia | 1 – 3 | Italy | 25-19 • 17-25 • 22-25 • 27–29 |

5-8th place
1999-09-11 – Vienna
Bulgaria | 0
Netherlands | 3
1999-09-11 – Vienna
France | 3
Austria | 0

5th place
1999-09-12 – Vienna
Netherlands | 3
France | 2
7th place
1999-09-12 – Vienna
Bulgaria | 3
Austria | 0

- Saturday September 11

| Bulgaria | 0 – 3 | Netherlands | 17-25 • 19-25 • 18–25 |
| France | 3 – 0 | Austria | 25-15 • 25-23 • 27–25 |

- Sunday September 12

| Bulgaria | 3 – 0 | Austria | 25-23 • 25-19 • 25–15 |
| Netherlands | 3 – 2 | France | 25-21 • 23-25 • 22-25 • 25-23 • 24–22 |

== Final ranking ==
| Place | Team |
|---|---|
| 1st place, gold medalist(s) | Italy |
| 2nd place, silver medalist(s) | Russia |
| 3rd place, bronze medalist(s) | Yugoslavia |
| 4. | Czech Republic |
| 5. | Netherlands |
| 6. | France |
| 7. | Bulgaria |
| 8. | Austria |

1999 Men's European champions

Italy
Fourth title

Team Roster
Marco Bracci, Mirko Corsano, Andrea Gardini, Andrea Giani, Leondino Giombini, Pasquale Gravina, Marco Meoni, Luigi Mastrangelo, Samuele Papi, Simone Rosalba, Andrea Sartoretti, and Paolo Tofoli.
Head coach: Andrea Anastasi.
