= Simone Rosalba =

Italian volleyball player (born 1976)

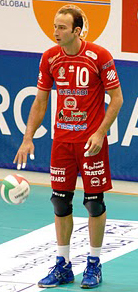
- Simone Rosalba

Personal information
- Nationality: Italian
- Born: January 31, 1976 (age 50); Paola, Calabria, Italy
- Height: 196 cm (6 ft 5 in)

Volleyball information
- Position: Outside hitter
- Number: 10
Honours
Men's volleyball
Representing Italy
Olympic Games
Bronze medal – third place	2000 Sydney	Team
World Championship
Gold medal – first place	1998 Japan	Team
European Championship
Gold medal – first place	1999 Vienna	Team
Bronze medal – third place	1997 Den Bosch	Team

Simone Rosalba (born January 31, 1976) is an Italian retired volleyball player. He won the bronze medal with the men's national team at the 2000 Summer Olympics. Playing as an outside hitter, he claimed his first medal (bronze) for the Azzurri in 1997 at the European Championship in the Netherlands.
