= Davide Bellini =

Italian volleyball player

Personal information
- Nationality: Italian
- Born: 20 May 1969 (age 57); Carpi, Emilia-Romagna
- Height: 6 ft 6 in (1.97 m)

Volleyball information
- Position: Setter

Career
Years	Teams
1985-1989; 1989-1990; 1990-1991; 1991-1994; 1994-1996; 1996-1997; 1997-1998; 1998-2000; 2000-2002; 2002-2003; 2003-2004; 2004-2005; 2005-2007; 2007-2009; 2009-2010; 2010-2012; 2012-2013	(Italy) Panini Modena (Italy) Buffetti Bologna (Italy) Gabbiano Mantova (Italy) Alpitour Diesel Cuneo (Italy) Edilcuoghi Ravenna (Italy) Colmark Brescia (Italy) Piaggio Rome (Italy) Vallaverde Ravenna (Italy) Bossini Montichiari (Italy) Lube Banca Marche Macerata (Italy) Telephonica Gioia Del Colle (Austria) Hypo Tirol Innsbruck (Italy) Cimone Modena (Italy) Yoga Forlì (Italy) Pallavolo Carpi (Italy) Pallavolo Pineto (Italy) Volleyball San Martino

Davide Bellini (born 20 May 1969) is an Italian volleyball player, playing in position setter.

== Sporting achievements ==
=== Clubs ===
European Champions Cup:

- 1987, 1988, 1989, 1995

Italian Championship:

- 1987, 1988, 1989

Italian Cup:

- 1988, 1989, 2003

European Super Cup:

- 1994

CEV Cup:

- 1996, 2003

Austrian Cup:

- 2005

Austrian Championship:

- 2005

Top Teams Cup:

- 2007

=== National team ===
Mediterranean Games:

- 1991

World League:

- 1994, 1995, 1997, 1999
- 1996
- 1993

European Championship:

- 1993
- 1997

World Grand Champions Cup:

- 1993

World Cup:

- 1995
