= Giacomo Giretto =

Italian volleyball player (born 1973)

Personal information
- Born: 5 January 1973 (age 53); Imperia, Liguria
- Height: 206 cm (6 ft 9 in)
Honours
Men's volleyball
Representing Italy
World Championship
Gold medal – first place	1994 Greece	Team
Summer Universiade
Bronze medal – third place	1995 Fukuoka	Team

Giacomo Giretto (born 5 January 1973) is an Italian volleyball player, who earned a total number of 85 caps for the Men's National Team. He was on the side that won the title at the 1994 World Championships in Greece.
