= Gilmar Teixeira =

Brazilian volleyball player (born 1970)

Personal information
- Full name: Gilmar Nascimento Teixeira
- Nickname: Kid
- Born: 30 October 1970 (age 56); Porto Alegre, Rio Grande do Sul, Brazil
- Height: 1.98 m (6 ft 6 in)
- Weight: 93 kg (205 lb)

Volleyball information
- Position: Outside spiker / Libero

National team
1991–2000	Brazil
Honours
Men's volleyball
Representing Brazil
World Grand Champions Cup
Gold medal – first place	1997 Japan
World League
Gold medal – first place	1993 São Paulo
Silver medal – second place	1995 Rio de Janeiro
Bronze medal – third place	1994 Milan
Bronze medal – third place	1999 Mar del Plata
Bronze medal – third place	2000 Rotterdam
South American Championship
Gold medal – first place	1993 Argentina
Gold medal – first place	1997 Venezuela
Gold medal – first place	1999 Argentina

Gilmar "Kid" Nascimento Teixeira (born 30 October 1970) is a Brazilian former volleyball player. He was part of the Brazil men's national volleyball team, and competed in the 2000 Summer Olympics in Sydney, Australia, finishing 6th.

== See also ==
- Brazil at the 2000 Summer Olympics
