= 1989 Men's European Volleyball Championship =

Tournament details
- Host country: Sweden
- Dates: September 23–October 1
- Teams: 12
- Venues: 2 (in 2 host cities)

Final positions
- Champions: Italy (1st title)

The 1989 Men's European Volleyball Championship was the sixteenth edition of the event, organized by Europe's governing volleyball body, the European Volleyball Confederation. It was hosted in Örebro and Stockholm, Sweden, from September 23 to October 1, 1989.

== Teams ==
Group A – Stockholm

- Bulgaria
- East Germany
- France
- Italy
- Sweden
- West Germany

Group B – Örebro

- Greece
- Netherlands
- Poland
- Romania
- Soviet Union
- Yugoslavia

== Preliminary round ==
=== Group A ===
	Team	Points	G	W	L	PW	PL	Ratio	SW	SL	Ratio
1.	Italy	9	5	4	1	277	186	1.489	14	6	2.333
2.	Sweden	9	5	4	1	255	230	1.109	12	8	1.500
3.	Bulgaria	8	5	3	2	260	222	1.171	12	8	1.500
4.	France	8	5	3	2	240	215	1.116	10	9	1.111
5.	West Germany	6	5	1	4	176	244	0.721	6	13	0.462
6.	East Germany	5	5	0	5	170	281	0.605	5	15	0.333

=== Group B ===
	Team	Points	G	W	L	PW	PL	Ratio	SW	SL	Ratio
1.	Soviet Union	10	5	5	0	258	190	1.358	15	4	3.750
2.	Netherlands	8	5	3	2	249	169	1.473	11	7	1.572
3.	Poland	8	5	3	2	198	185	1.070	10	7	1.429
4.	Yugoslavia	8	5	3	2	263	289	0.910	11	11	1.000
5.	Romania	6	5	1	4	164	242	0.678	5	13	0.385
6.	Greece	5	5	0	5	217	274	0.792	5	15	0.333

== Final round ==
Semi-finals
1989-09-30 – Stockholm
Sweden	3
Soviet Union	2
1989-09-30 – Stockholm
Italy	3
Netherlands	0

Final
1989-10-01 – Stockholm
Sweden	1
Italy	3
3rd place
1989-10-01 – Stockholm
Soviet Union	0
Netherlands	3

5-8th place
1989-09-30 – Stockholm
France	3
Poland	2
1989-09-30 – Stockholm
Bulgaria	3
Yugoslavia	0

5th place
1989-10-01 – Stockholm
France	3
Bulgaria	1
7th place
1989-10-01 – Stockholm
Poland	3
Yugoslavia	1

9-12th place
1989-09-30 – Stockholm
East Germany	3
Romania	2
1989-09-30 – Stockholm
Greece	3
West Germany	0

9th place
1989-10-01 – Stockholm
East Germany	3
Greece	2
11th place
1989-10-01 – Stockholm
Romania	2
West Germany	3

== Final ranking ==
Place	Team
1st place, gold medalist(s)	Italy
2nd place, silver medalist(s)	Sweden
3rd place, bronze medalist(s)	Netherlands
4.	Soviet Union
5.	France
6.	Bulgaria
7.	Poland
8.	Yugoslavia
9.	East Germany
10.	Greece
11.	West Germany
12.	Romania

1989 Men's European champions

Italy
First title

Team Roster
Andrea Anastasi, Lorenzo Bernardi, Marco Bracci, Luca Cantagalli, Ferdinando De Giorgi, Andrea Gardini, Andrea Lucchetta, Stefano Margutti, Roberto Masciarelli, Gilberto Passani, Paolo Tofoli, and Andrea Zorzi.
Head coach: Julio Velasco.
