= Claudio Galli =

Italian volleyball player (born 1965)

Personal information
- Nationality: Italian
- Born: 12 July 1965 (age 59); Milan, Italy

Sport
- Sport: Volleyball

Claudio Galli (born 12 July 1965) is an Italian volleyball player. He competed at the 1988 Summer Olympics and the 1992 Summer Olympics. In off-years, he competed for the Italian men's national volleyball team.
