= Damiano Pippi =

Italian volleyball player

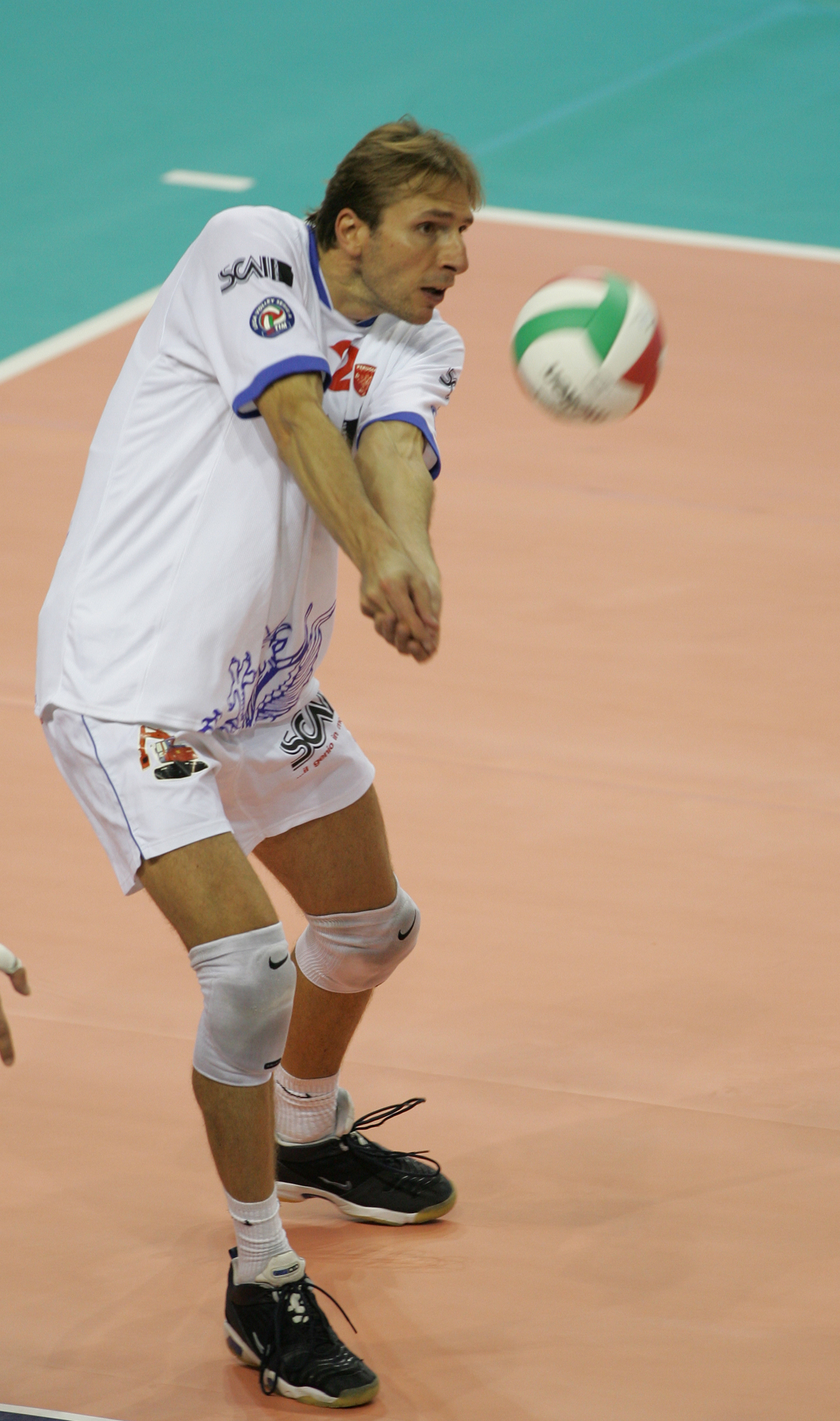

Personal information
- Full name: Damiano Pippi
- Nationality: Italian
- Born: 23 August 1971 (age 55)
- Height: 194 cm (6 ft 4 in)
- Weight: 75 kg (165 lb)
Medal record
Men's volleyball
Representing Italy
Olympic Games
Silver medal – second place	2004 Athens	Team competition
World Cup
Silver medal – second place	2003 Japan	Team competition

Damiano Pippi (born 23 August 1971 in Castiglione del Lago) is a former volleyball player from Italy who won the silver medal with the Italian men's national team at the 2004 Summer Olympics in Athens.

== Individual awards ==
- 1993 FIVB World League "Best Digger"

=== State awards ===
- 2004 Officer's Order of Merit of the Italian Republic
