= Michele Pasinato =

Italian volleyball player (1969–2021)

Personal information
- Nickname: Paso, Micky
- Born: 13 March 1969; Cittadella, Italy
- Died: 8 April 2021 (aged 52); Padua, Italy
- Height: 196 cm (6 ft 5 in)

Volleyball information
- Position: Opposite
- Number: 15

National team
1990-1998	Italy
Honours
Men's volleyball
Representing Italy
World Championship
Gold medal – first place	1998 Japan	Team
Goodwill Games
Gold medal – first place	1990 Seattle
European Championship
Gold medal – first place	1993 Finland
Gold medal – first place	1995 Greece

Michele Pasinato (13 March 1969 – 8 April 2021) was an Italian volleyball player who earned a total number of 256 caps for the Italian men's national volleyball team in the 1990s. Nicknamed "Paso" and "Micky", he was on the side that won the title at the 1998 World Championships in Japan.
