= 1990 FIVB Volleyball World League =

International volleyball competition

1990 World League
Tournament details
- Host country: Japan (Final)
- Dates: 27 April – 15 July
- Teams: 8

Final positions
- Champions: Italy (1st title)

Tournament awards
- MVP: (Italy) Andrea Zorzi

The 1990 FIVB Volleyball World League was the first edition of the annual men's international volleyball tournament, played by 8 countries from 27 April to 15 July 1990. The Final Round was held in Osaka, Japan.

== Pools composition ==
Pool A	Pool B
Brazil; France; Italy; United States	China; Japan; Netherlands; Soviet Union

== Intercontinental round ==
=== Pool A ===
Pos	Team	Pld	W	L	Pts	SW	SL	SR	SPW	SPL	SPR	Qualification
1	Italy	12	9	3	21	31	19	1.632	676	569	1.188	Semifinals
2	Brazil	12	9	3	21	29	20	1.450	647	589	1.098	Semifinals
3	France	12	5	7	17	24	26	0.923	602	635	0.948	
4	United States	12	1	11	13	15	34	0.441	544	676	0.805	

Date		Score		Set 1	Set 2	Set 3	Set 4	Set 5	Total
27 Apr	France	3–2	United States	15–11	15–10	14–16	13–15	17–16	74–68
27 Apr	Italy	2–3	Brazil	12–15	15–13	6–15	15–8	12–15	60–66
28 Apr	France	3–2	United States	16–14	3–15	5–15	15–9	16–14	55–67
28 Apr	Italy	3–1	Brazil	15–10	15–5	10–15	15–10		55–40
4 May	Italy	3–0	United States	16–14	15–7	15–4			46–25
4 May	France	2–3	Brazil	15–12	15–12	4–15	13–15	12–15	59–69
5 May	Italy	3–1	United States	10–15	15–8	15–6	15–11		55–40
5 May	France	3–0	Brazil	15–6	15–9	15–9			45–24
11 May	United States	3–1	France	15–9	9–15	15–11	15–10		54–45
11 May	Brazil	3–1	Italy	15–9	12–15	16–14	17–16		60–54
12 May	United States	0–3	France	11–15	9–15	9–15			29–45
12 May	Brazil	3–1	Italy	15–9	12–15	16–14	17–16		60–54
18 May	Brazil	3–0	France	15–12	15–13	15–6			45–31
18 May	United States	1–3	Italy	10–15	4–15	17–15	12–15		43–60
19 May	Brazil	1–3	France	14–16	15–10	6–15	11–15		46–56
19 May	United States	1–3	Italy	15–13	7–15	7–15	14–16		43–59
25 May	Brazil	3–2	United States	9–15	15–7	12–15	15–3	17–15	68–55
25 May	Italy	3–2	France	12–15	8–15	15–12	15–7	15–12	65–61
26 May	Brazil	3–1	United States	15–6	12–15	15–9	15–7		57–37
26 May	Italy	3–2	France	10–15	15–13	6–15	15–10	15–7	61–60
1 Jun	United States	1–3	Brazil	15–13	9–15	8–15	6–15		38–58
1 Jun	France	2–3	Italy	15–6	2–15	15–11	11–15	11–15	54–62
2 Jun	United States	1–3	Brazil	12–15	11–15	15–9	7–15		45–54
2 Jun	France	0–3	Italy	6–15	3–15	8–15			17–45

=== Pool B ===
Pos	Team	Pld	W	L	Pts	SW	SL	SR	SPW	SPL	SPR	Qualification
1	Netherlands	12	11	1	23	34	4	8.500	556	360	1.544	Semifinals
2	Soviet Union	12	8	4	20	26	15	1.733	549	470	1.168	Semifinals
3	Japan	12	5	7	17	16	23	0.696	454	489	0.928	
4	China	12	0	12	12	2	36	0.056	319	559	0.571	

Date		Score		Set 1	Set 2	Set 3	Set 4	Set 5	Total
27 Apr	Netherlands	3–0	Soviet Union	15–9	15–13	15–11			45–33
27 Apr	Soviet Union	1–3	Netherlands	13–15	15–13	10–15	10–15		48–58
28 Apr	Netherlands	3–0	Soviet Union	15–3	15–2	17–16			47–21
28 Apr	Soviet Union	3–1	Netherlands	15–17	15–12	15–7	15–9		60–45
4 May	Japan	1–3	Soviet Union	15–12	15–8	10–15	16–14		56–49
4 May	Netherlands	3–0	China	15–8	15–6	15–12			45–26
5 May	Japan	3–1	Soviet Union	15–13	11–15	15–13	16–14		57–55
5 May	Netherlands	3–0	China	15–3	16–14	15–7			46–24
11 May	Netherlands	3–0	Japan	15–7	15–5	15–13			45–25
11 May	Soviet Union	3–0	China	15–8	15–8	15–10			45–26
12 May	Netherlands	3–0	Japan	15–7	15–12	15–11			45–30
12 May	Soviet Union	3–0	China	15–3	15–9	15–12			45–24
18 May	China	0–3	Soviet Union	7–15	2–15	6–15			15–45
18 May	Japan	0–3	Netherlands	10–15	12–15	8–15			30–45
19 May	China	1–3	Soviet Union	15–12	14–16	6–15	5–15		40–58
19 May	Japan	0–3	Netherlands	3–15	7–15	4–15			14–45
25 May	Soviet Union	3–0	Japan	15–9	15–10	15–8			45–27
25 May	China	0–3	Netherlands	4–15	8–15	9–15			21–45
26 May	Soviet Union	3–0	Japan	15–13	15–5	15–12			45–30
26 May	China	0–3	Netherlands	12–15	5–15	11–15			28–45
1 Jun	Japan	3–0	China	15–10	15–8	15–5			45–23
1 Jun	China	0–3	Japan	10–15	12–15	7–15			29–45
2 Jun	Japan	3–0	China	15–7	15–13	15–11			45–31
2 Jun	China	1–3	Japan	15–5	3–15	5–15	9–15		32–50

== Final round ==
- Venue: Osaka Prefectural Gymnasium, Osaka, Japan

Semifinals
14 July
Italy	3
Soviet Union	2
14 July
Netherlands	3
Brazil	0

Final
15 July
Italy	3
Netherlands	0
3rd place match
15 July
Soviet Union	1
Brazil	3

=== Semifinals ===
Date		Score		Set 1	Set 2	Set 3	Set 4	Set 5	Total
14 Jul	Italy	3–2	Soviet Union	15–12	16–17	15–11	14–16	15–9	75–65
14 Jul	Netherlands	3–0	Brazil	15–7	15–7	15–10			45–24

=== 3rd place match ===
Date		Score		Set 1	Set 2	Set 3	Set 4	Set 5	Total
15 Jul	Soviet Union	1–3	Brazil	16–14	7–15	10–15	12–15		45–59

=== Final ===
Date		Score		Set 1	Set 2	Set 3	Set 4	Set 5	Total
15 Jul	Italy	3–0	Netherlands	15–7	16–14	16–14			47–35

== Final standing ==
Rank	Team
1st place, gold medalist(s)	Italy
2nd place, silver medalist(s)	Netherlands
3rd place, bronze medalist(s)	Brazil
4	Soviet Union
5	France
6	Japan
7	United States
8	China

1990 World League champions

Italy
1st title

== Awards ==
- Most valuable player

(Italy) Andrea Zorzi

- Best spiker

(Netherlands) Ron Zwerver

- Best blocker

(Italy) Andrea Gardini

- Best setter

(Italy) Paolo Tofoli
