= 1989 FIVB Volleyball Men's World Cup =

1989 Men's World Cup
Tournament details
- Host country: Japan
- Dates: 17–26 November
- Teams: 8
- Venues: 3 (in 3 host cities)

Final positions
- Champions: Cuba (1st title)
- Runners-up: Italy
- Third place: Soviet Union
- Fourth place: United States

Tournament awards
- MVP: (United States) Karch Kiraly

The 1989 FIVB Men's World Cup was held from 17 to 26 November 1989 in Japan. Eight men's national teams played in three cities in Japan (Tokyo, Osaka, and Hiroshima) for the right to a fast lane ticket into the 1992 Summer Olympics in Barcelona, Spain. Cuba emerged as Champion, with Italy as the runners-up, the Soviet Union in third place, and the United States in fourth.

== Qualification ==
Means of qualification	Date	Host	Vacancies	Qualified
Host country	—	―	1	Japan
Volleyball at the 1988 Summer Olympics	17 Sep – 2 Oct 1988	(South Korea) Seoul	2	United States
Volleyball at the 1988 Summer Olympics	17 Sep – 2 Oct 1988	(South Korea) Seoul	2	Soviet Union
1989 Men's European Volleyball Championship	23 Sep – 1 Oct 1989	Sweden	1	Italy
1989 Men's NORCECA Volleyball Championship	8–15 July 1989	(Puerto Rico) San Juan	1	Cuba
1989 Men's South American Volleyball Championship	23–30 September 1989	(Brazil) Curitiba	1	Brazil
1989 Asian Men's Volleyball Championship	15–24 September 1989	(South Korea) Seoul	1	South Korea
1989 Men's African Volleyball Championship	1989	(Ivory Coast) Abidjan	1	Cameroon
Total			8	

== Results ==
Pos	Team	Pld	W	L	Pts	SW	SL	SR	SPW	SPL	SPR
1	Cuba	7	7	0	14	21	3	7.000	343	219	1.566
2	Italy	7	6	1	13	20	5	4.000	353	236	1.496
3	Soviet Union	7	5	2	12	16	11	1.455	331	295	1.122
4	United States	7	3	4	10	13	14	0.929	339	307	1.104
5	Brazil	7	3	4	10	13	14	0.929	319	319	1.000
6	Japan	7	2	5	9	10	16	0.625	306	308	0.994
7	South Korea	7	2	5	9	8	17	0.471	247	334	0.740
8	Cameroon	7	0	7	7	0	21	0.000	95	315	0.302

All times are Japan Standard Time (UTC+09:00).

Location: Osaka

Date		Score		Set 1	Set 2	Set 3	Set 4	Set 5	Total
17 Nov	Cuba	3–0	Brazil	16–14	15–5	15–9			46–28
17 Nov	Soviet Union	3–2	United States	16–14	5–15	15–11	4–15	15–13	55–68
17 Nov	Italy	3–0	Cameroon	15–2	15–1	15–4			45–7
17 Nov	South Korea	3–2	Japan	11–15	7–15	15–12	16–14	17–15	66–71
18 Nov	Italy	3–0	Soviet Union	15–8	15–12	15–7			45–27
18 Nov	Cuba	3–0	United States	15–8	5–11	15–12			45–31
18 Nov	Brazil	3–0	South Korea	15–3	15–5	15–8			45–16
18 Nov	Japan	3–0	Cameroon	15–4	15–2	15–1			45–7
19 Nov	Cuba	3–2	Italy	15–13	13–15	3–15	15–4	15–13	61–60
19 Nov	United States	3–1	South Korea	15–6	15–12	13–15	15–4		58–37
19 Nov	Soviet Union	3–0	Cameroon	15–6	15–5	15–2			45–13
19 Nov	Japan	3–1	Brazil	15–4	10–15	15–3	15–12		55–34

Location: Hiroshima

Date		Score		Set 1	Set 2	Set 3	Set 4	Set 5	Total
22 Nov	Italy	3–0	South Korea	15–11	15–5	15–7			45–23
22 Nov	Cuba	3–1	Soviet Union	15–12	15–8	10–15	15–4		55–39
22 Nov	Brazil	3–0	Cameroon	15–6	15–8	15–7			45–21
22 Nov	United States	3–1	Japan	8–15	15–13	15–7	15–11		53–46
23 Nov	Cuba	3–0	Cameroon	15–9	15–4	15–4			45–17
23 Nov	Brazil	3–2	United States	15–11	13–15	15–6	6–15	15–13	64–60
23 Nov	Soviet Union	3–1	South Korea	16–14	9–15	15–1	15–10		55–40
23 Nov	Italy	3–0	Japan	15–11	15–9	15–8			45–28

Location: Tokyo

Date		Score		Set 1	Set 2	Set 3	Set 4	Set 5	Total
25 Nov	Italy	3–2	Brazil	15–8	15–12	11–15	10–15	17–16	68–66
25 Nov	United States	3–0	Cameroon	15–4	15–3	15–8			45–15
25 Nov	Cuba	3–0	South Korea	15–10	15–1	15–9			45–20
25 Nov	Soviet Union	3–1	Japan	15–6	12–15	15–10	15–6		57–37
26 Nov	South Korea	3–0	Cameroon	15–2	15–5	15–8			45–15
26 Nov	Italy	3–0	United States	15–7	15–11	15–6			45–24
26 Nov	Soviet Union	3–1	Brazil	8–15	15–9	15–10	15–3		53–37
26 Nov	Cuba	3–0	Japan	15–7	16–14	15–3			46–24

== Final standing ==
Rank	Team
1st place, gold medalist(s)	Cuba
2nd place, silver medalist(s)	Italy
3rd place, bronze medalist(s)	Soviet Union
4	United States
5	Brazil
6	Japan
7	South Korea
8	Cameroon

Qualified for the 1992 Summer Olympics

1989 Men's World Cup champions

Cuba
1st title

== Awards ==
- Most valuable player
  (United States) Karch Kiraly
- Best spiker
  (Italy) Andrea Gardini
- Best blocker
  (Brazil) Giovane Gávio
- Best setter
  (Japan) Masayoshi Manabe
- Best defender
  (United States) Robert Ctvrtlik
- Best receiver
  (United States) Troy Tanner
- Best on the pitch
  (Cuba) Lázaro Beltrán
