= 1991 FIVB Volleyball World League =

International volleyball competition

1991 World League
Tournament details
- Host country: Italy (Final)
- Dates: 17 May – 27 July
- Teams: 10

Final positions
- Champions: Italy (2nd title)

Tournament awards
- MVP: (Italy) Andrea Zorzi

The 1991 FIVB Volleyball World League was the second edition of the annual men's international volleyball tournament, played by 10 countries from 17 May to 27 July 1991. The Final Round was held in Milan, Italy.

== Pools composition ==
Pool A	Pool B
Cuba; Brazil; Canada; France; Netherlands	Italy; Japan; Soviet Union; South Korea; United States

== Intercontinental round ==
=== Pool A ===
Pos	Team	Pld	W	L	Pts	SW	SL	SR	SPW	SPL	SPR	Qualification
1	Cuba	16	15	1	31	46	13	3.538	850	616	1.380	Semifinals
2	Netherlands	16	12	4	28	39	20	1.950	785	632	1.242	Semifinals
3	Brazil	16	8	8	24	32	32	1.000	787	811	0.970	
4	France	16	3	13	19	18	42	0.429	652	821	0.794	
5	Canada	16	2	14	18	17	45	0.378	677	871	0.777	

Date		Score		Set 1	Set 2	Set 3	Set 4	Set 5	Total
17 May	Cuba	3–0	Netherlands	15–9	15–10	15–12			45–31
17 May	France	3–0	Canada	16–14	15–9	15–11			46–34
18 May	Cuba	3–0	Netherlands	15–8	15–3	15–10			45–21
18 May	France	3–2	Canada	12–15	11–15	15–10	15–8	15–12	68–60
24 May	Brazil	1–3	Cuba	11–15	3–15	15–9	9–15		38–54
24 May	Canada	1–3	France	8–15	14–16	15–10	9–15		46–56
25 May	Brazil	2–3	Cuba	15–6	10–15	17–16	14–16	16–18	72–71
25 May	Canada	3–2	France	15–12	7–15	15–11	11–15	15–13	63–66
31 May	France	1–3	Brazil	10–15	1–15	15–7	9–15		35–52
31 May	Canada	1–3	Netherlands	5–15	15–13	12–15	8–15		40–58
1 Jun	France	1–3	Brazil	7–15	15–10	7–15	12–15		41–55
1 Jun	Canada	2–3	Netherlands	5–15	15–9	17–16	6–15	16–18	59–73
7 Jun	Cuba	3–0	Brazil	16–14	15–8	15–4			46–26
7 Jun	Netherlands	3–0	France	15–10	15–3	15–10			45–23
8 Jun	Cuba	3–1	Brazil	15–11	10–15	15–9	15–13		55–48
8 Jun	Netherlands	3–0	France	15–4	15–8	15–2			45–14
14 Jun	Cuba	3–0	Canada	15–6	15–13	15–13			45–32
14 Jun	Brazil	2–3	Netherlands	16–14	11–15	11–15	15–8	7–15	60–67
15 Jun	Cuba	3–0	Canada	15–6	15–11	15–8			45–25
15 Jun	Brazil	0–3	Netherlands	10–15	3–15	3–15			16–45
21 Jun	Brazil	3–0	France	15–11	16–14	15–9			46–34
21 Jun	Canada	0–3	Cuba	13–15	11–15	3–15			27–45
22 Jun	Brazil	3–1	France	15–8	17–15	9–15	17–16		58–54
22 Jun	Canada	1–3	Cuba	16–18	15–13	4–15	7–15		42–61
28 Jun	Netherlands	3–1	Canada	15–12	10–15	15–8	15–5		55–40
28 Jun	France	1–3	Cuba	5–15	15–12	9–15	2–15		31–57
29 Jun	Netherlands	3–0	Canada	15–3	15–8	15–6			45–17
29 Jun	France	1–3	Cuba	5–15	8–15	15–12	5–15		33–57
5 Jul	Canada	3–1	Brazil	15–11	15–11	11–15	15–6		56–43
5 Jul	France	0–3	Netherlands	13–15	5–15	9–15			27–45
6 Jul	Canada	1–3	Brazil	15–11	8–15	15–17	16–18		54–61
6 Jul	France	0–3	Netherlands	13–15	5–15	9–15			27–45
12 Jul	Netherlands	1–3	Cuba	8–15	15–13	9–15	7–15		39–58
12 Jul	Brazil	3–1	Canada	15–6	5–15	15–9	15–13		50–43
13 Jul	Netherlands	3–1	Cuba	15–13	7–15	15–10	17–15		54–53
13 Jul	Brazil	3–1	Canada	15–6	9–15	15–7	15–11		54–39
19 Jul	Cuba	3–0	France	15–13	15–12	17–15			47–40
19 Jul	Netherlands	3–1	Brazil	11–15	15–6	15–10	16–14		57–45
20 Jul	Cuba	3–2	France	15–10	9–15	15–6	12–15	15–11	66–57
20 Jul	Netherlands	2–3	Brazil	15–11	10–15	10–15	15–7	10–15	60–63

=== Pool B ===
Pos	Team	Pld	W	L	Pts	SW	SL	SR	SPW	SPL	SPR	Qualification
1	Italy	16	14	2	30	46	14	3.286	839	614	1.366	Semifinals
2	Soviet Union	16	11	5	27	41	24	1.708	843	722	1.168	Semifinals
3	United States	16	6	10	22	24	38	0.632	715	815	0.877	
4	Japan	16	5	11	21	22	38	0.579	672	798	0.842	
5	South Korea	16	4	12	20	19	38	0.500	638	758	0.842	

Date		Score		Set 1	Set 2	Set 3	Set 4	Set 5	Total
17 May	United States	3–1	Japan	15–9	15–13	13–15	15–11		58–48
17 May	South Korea	1–3	Soviet Union	10–15	17–15	8–15	8–15		43–60
18 May	United States	3–2	Japan	15–12	16–17	12–15	15–13	15–8	73–65
18 May	South Korea	0–3	Soviet Union	9–15	6–15	6–15			21–45
24 May	Soviet Union	3–2	Italy	10–15	15–11	15–11	3–15	15–10	58–62
24 May	Japan	3–2	South Korea	11–15	15–9	15–4	11–15	16–14	68–57
25 May	Soviet Union	2–3	Italy	1–15	9–15	15–12	15–13	9–15	49–70
25 May	Japan	3–0	South Korea	15–9	15–12	15–8			45–29
31 May	Soviet Union	3–0	Japan	15–9	15–5	15–12			45–26
31 May	United States	0–3	Italy	13–15	11–15	15–17			39–47
1 Jun	Soviet Union	3–0	Japan	15–9	15–8	15–10			45–27
1 Jun	United States	3–2	Italy	3–15	15–11	15–10	3–15	15–10	51–61
7 Jun	Italy	3–0	Japan	15–6	15–7	15–8			45–21
7 Jun	United States	1–3	South Korea	10–15	13–15	15–13	7–15		45–58
8 Jun	Italy	3–0	Japan	15–6	15–11	15–7			45–24
8 Jun	United States	3–0	South Korea	15–3	15–7	15–11			45–21
14 Jun	Italy	3–0	South Korea	15–13	15–3	15–7			45–23
14 Jun	Soviet Union	3–0	United States	15–10	15–4	15–5			45–19
15 Jun	Italy	3–0	South Korea	15–12	15–9	15–11			45–32
15 Jun	Soviet Union	3–1	United States	15–1	15–10	13–15	15–6		58–32
21 Jun	Italy	3–0	United States	15–7	15–9	15–10			45–26
21 Jun	Japan	1–3	Soviet Union	15–12	8–15	7–15	3–15		33–57
22 Jun	Italy	3–0	United States	17–15	15–9	15–10			47–34
22 Jun	Japan	3–1	Soviet Union	15–11	6–15	15–12	16–14		52–52
28 Jun	Italy	3–2	Soviet Union	15–6	15–12	3–15	7–15	15–13	55–61
28 Jun	South Korea	3–0	Japan	15–9	15–12	15–10			45–31
29 Jun	Italy	3–1	Soviet Union	14–16	15–11	15–3	15–7		59–37
29 Jun	South Korea	3–1	Japan	15–10	15–11	3–15	15–6		48–42
5 Jul	Soviet Union	3–2	South Korea	14–16	10–15	15–4	15–6	15–13	69–54
5 Jul	Japan	3–1	United States	15–8	6–15	16–14	15–9		52–46
6 Jul	Soviet Union	3–0	South Korea	15–12	15–13	15–10			45–35
6 Jul	Japan	3–1	United States	15–8	7–15	15–4	15–12		52–39
12 Jul	Japan	2–3	Italy	15–9	17–15	2–15	12–15	10–15	56–69
12 Jul	South Korea	3–0	United States	15–9	15–13	15–11			45–33
13 Jul	Japan	0–3	Italy	12–15	5–15	13–15			30–45
13 Jul	South Korea	1–3	United States	15–12	9–15	15–3	15–11		54–41
19 Jul	United States	2–3	Soviet Union	13–15	10–15	15–2	15–9	13–15	66–56
19 Jul	South Korea	0–3	Italy	13–15	11–15	8–15			32–45
20 Jul	United States	3–2	Soviet Union	8–15	14–16	15–4	15–12	16–14	68–61
20 Jul	South Korea	1–3	Italy	8–15	15–9	8–15	10–15		41–54

== Final round ==
- Venue: Forum di Assago, Assago, Italy

Semifinals
26 July
Italy	3
Netherlands	2
26 July
Cuba	3
Soviet Union	2

Final
27 July
Italy	3
Cuba	0
3rd place match
27 July
Netherlands	1
Soviet Union	3

=== Semifinals ===
Date		Score		Set 1	Set 2	Set 3	Set 4	Set 5	Total
26 Jul	Italy	3–2	Netherlands	12–15	10–15	16–14	15–5	15–7	68–56
26 Jul	Cuba	3–2	Soviet Union	15–8	10–15	15–11	12–15	15–12	67–61

=== 3rd place match ===
Date		Score		Set 1	Set 2	Set 3	Set 4	Set 5	Total
27 Jul	Netherlands	1–3	Soviet Union	12–15	15–10	13–15	8–15		48–55

=== Final ===
Date		Score		Set 1	Set 2	Set 3	Set 4	Set 5	Total
27 Jul	Italy	3–0	Cuba	16–14	15–12	15–13			46–39

== Final standing ==
Rank	Team
1st place, gold medalist(s)	Italy
2nd place, silver medalist(s)	Cuba
3rd place, bronze medalist(s)	Soviet Union
4	Netherlands
5	Brazil
6	United States
7	Japan
8	France
9	South Korea
10	Canada

1991 World League champions

Italy
2nd title

== Awards ==
- Most valuable player
  - (Italy) Andrea Zorzi
- Best spiker
  - (Netherlands) Ron Zwerver
- Best setter
  - (South Korea) Shin Young-chul
- Best blocker
  - (Netherlands) Martin van der Horst
- Best server
  - (Netherlands) Ron Zwerver
- Best receiver
  - (United States) Scott Fortune
- Best digger
  - (United States) Scott Fortune
