= 1992 FIVB Volleyball World League =

International volleyball competition

1992 World League
Tournament details
- Host country: Italy (Final)
- Dates: 1 May – 5 September
- Teams: 12

Final positions
- Champions: Italy (3rd title)

Tournament awards
- MVP: (Italy) Lorenzo Bernardi

The 1992 FIVB Volleyball World League was the third edition of the annual men's international volleyball tournament, played by 12 countries from 1 May to 5 September 1992. The Final Round was held in Genoa, Italy.

== Pools composition ==
Pool A	Pool B	Pool C
China; CIS; Japan; United States	Canada; Cuba; Germany; Netherlands	Brazil; France; Italy; South Korea

== Intercontinental round ==
=== Pool A ===
Pos	Team	Pld	W	L	Pts	SW	SL	SR	SPW	SPL	SPR	Qualification
1	United States	12	10	2	22	33	14	2.357	638	519	1.229	Playoff round
2	CIS	12	9	3	21	29	16	1.813	592	487	1.216	Playoff round
3	China	12	3	9	15	17	31	0.548	545	608	0.896	
4	Japan	12	2	10	14	13	31	0.419	445	606	0.734	

Date		Score		Set 1	Set 2	Set 3	Set 4	Set 5	Total
1 May	China	2–3	CIS	15–12	10–15	15–7	9–15	11–15	60–64
1 May	United States	3–0	Japan	15–3	15–7	15–12			45–22
2 May	China	1–3	CIS	15–7	8–15	5–15	8–15		36–52
2 May	United States	3–0	Japan	15–7	15–7	15–12			45–26
8 May	United States	3–0	China	15–10	15–9	17–15			47–34
8 May	Japan	1–3	CIS	16–14	4–15	8–15	3–15		31–59
9 May	United States	3–2	China	15–7	15–11	16–17	13–15	15–13	74–63
9 May	Japan	0–3	CIS	7–15	13–15	6–15			26–45
15 May	CIS	3–0	China	15–2	15–13	15–7			45–22
15 May	Japan	2–3	United States	10–15	11–15	16–14	15–9	12–15	64–68
16 May	CIS	3–1	China	15–6	13–15	15–7	15–11		58–39
16 May	Japan	1–3	United States	15–13	13–15	5–15	3–15		36–58
22 May	United States	3–0	CIS	15–10	15–8	15–6			45–24
22 May	China	0–3	Japan	13–15	10–15	9–15			32–45
23 May	United States	3–0	CIS	15–11	15–11	15–7			45–29
23 May	China	3–1	Japan	15–6	15–7	5–15	15–8		50–36
29 May	CIS	3–0	Japan	15–13	15–13	15–12			45–38
29 May	China	1–3	United States	15–11	7–15	14–16	6–15		42–57
30 May	CIS	3–1	Japan	15–9	8–15	15–4	15–5		53–33
30 May	China	3–2	United States	15–3	15–0	6–15	10–15	15–9	61–42
5 Jun	CIS	3–1	United States	15–9	12–15	15–11	15–7		57–42
5 Jun	Japan	1–3	China	15–1	7–15	3–15	9–15		34–46
6 Jun	CIS	2–3	United States	15–13	15–12	11–15	10–15	10–15	61–70
6 Jun	Japan	3–1	China	11–15	15–13	15–17	13–15		54–60

=== Pool B ===
Pos	Team	Pld	W	L	Pts	SW	SL	SR	SPW	SPL	SPR	Qualification
1	Cuba	12	9	3	21	32	16	2.000	660	535	1.234	Playoff round
2	Netherlands	12	8	4	20	29	17	1.706	618	525	1.177	Playoff round
3	Canada	12	6	6	18	22	24	0.917	562	596	0.943	
4	Germany	12	1	11	13	9	35	0.257	450	634	0.710	

Date		Score		Set 1	Set 2	Set 3	Set 4	Set 5	Total
1 May	Germany	0–3	Netherlands	8–15	10–15	6–15			24–45
1 May	Canada	0–3	Cuba	16–17	11–15	8–15			35–47
2 May	Germany	1–3	Netherlands	9–15	15–12	13–15	10–15		47–57
2 May	Canada	3–2	Cuba	15–6	8–15	8–15	15–13	15–13	61–62
8 May	Cuba	3–1	Germany	15–6	13–15	15–10	15–5		58–36
8 May	Netherlands	1–3	Canada	15–7	8–15	14–16	8–15		45–53
9 May	Cuba	3–1	Germany	15–4	15–9	13–15	15–8		58–36
9 May	Netherlands	3–0	Canada	15–9	15–8	15–9			45–26
15 May	Germany	3–2	Cuba	15–10	11–15	16–14	9–15	15–12	66–66
15 May	Canada	2–3	Netherlands	15–9	9–15	13–15	15–13	9–15	61–67
16 May	Germany	0–3	Cuba	8–15	9–15	9–15			26–45
16 May	Canada	1–3	Netherlands	15–12	10–15	12–15	11–15		48–57
22 May	Cuba	3–0	Canada	15–3	15–13	15–7			45–23
22 May	Netherlands	3–0	Germany	15–7	15–12	15–3			45–22
23 May	Cuba	3–1	Canada	15–12	15–7	12–15	15–6		57–40
23 May	Netherlands	3–0	Germany	15–7	15–12	15–3			45–22
29 May	Cuba	3–2	Netherlands	10–15	15–13	15–10	13–15	15–10	68–63
29 May	Canada	3–1	Germany	15–12	15–9	10–15	15–10		55–46
30 May	Cuba	3–1	Netherlands	8–15	15–13	15–7	15–7		53–42
30 May	Canada	3–2	Germany	10–15	13–15	15–6	15–9	15–11	68–56
5 Jun	Netherlands	1–3	Cuba	16–14	14–16	6–15	14–16		50–61
5 Jun	Germany	0–3	Canada	13–15	15–17	8–15			36–47
6 Jun	Netherlands	3–1	Cuba	15–11	12–15	15–5	15–9		57–40
6 Jun	Germany	0–3	Canada	10–15	12–15	11–15			33–45

=== Pool C ===
Pos	Team	Pld	W	L	Pts	SW	SL	SR	SPW	SPL	SPR	Qualification
1	Italy	12	11	1	23	33	9	3.667	590	382	1.545	Playoff round
2	Brazil	12	7	5	19	26	19	1.368	569	514	1.107	Playoff round
3	South Korea	12	5	7	17	19	25	0.760	504	583	0.864	
4	France	12	1	11	13	9	34	0.265	408	592	0.689	

Date		Score		Set 1	Set 2	Set 3	Set 4	Set 5	Total
1 May	South Korea	3–2	Brazil	10–15	15–10	9–15	15–9	16–14	65–63
1 May	France	1–3	Italy	3–15	15–11	8–15	3–15		29–56
2 May	South Korea	1–3	Brazil	4–15	17–15	10–15	5–15		36–60
2 May	France	0–3	Italy	4–15	7–15	5–15			16–45
8 May	Italy	3–0	South Korea	15–0	15–9	17–15			47–24
8 May	Brazil	3–0	France	15–12	15–7	15–1			45–20
9 May	Italy	3–0	South Korea	16–14	15–1	16–14			47–29
9 May	Brazil	3–0	France	15–8	15–8	15–12			45–28
15 May	Brazil	1–3	Italy	16–14	13–15	14–16	7–15		50–60
15 May	South Korea	3–0	France	15–10	17–15	15–8			47–33
16 May	Brazil	1–3	Italy	3–15	15–5	6–15	5–15		29–50
16 May	South Korea	3–1	France	15–6	4–15	17–15	15–9		51–45
22 May	Italy	3–0	France	15–8	15–3	15–8			45–19
22 May	Brazil	3–0	South Korea	15–9	15–8	15–12			45–29
23 May	Italy	3–0	France	15–8	15–5	15–9			45–22
23 May	Brazil	3–0	South Korea	15–11	15–9	15–13			45–33
29 May	South Korea	2–3	Italy	15–5	15–12	7–15	12–15	8–15	57–62
29 May	France	2–3	Brazil	5–15	15–11	15–11	7–15	9–15	51–67
30 May	South Korea	3–0	Italy	15–7	16–14	16–14			47–35
30 May	France	1–3	Brazil	17–15	7–15	10–15	10–15		44–60
5 Jun	Italy	3–1	Brazil	15–1	8–15	15–13	15–10		53–39
5 Jun	France	3–1	South Korea	15–2	15–3	14–16	15–8		59–29
6 Jun	Italy	3–0	Brazil	15–6	15–8	15–7			45–21
6 Jun	France	1–3	South Korea	15–12	11–15	8–15	8–15		42–57

== Playoff round ==
- The top four teams qualified for the final phase.
- The results of all the matches in the first round were taken into account for this round.

Pos	Team	Pld	W	L	Pts	SW	SL	SR	SPW	SPL	SPR	Qualification
1	Italy	16	14	2	30	44	16	2.750	839	597	1.405	Final round
2	Cuba	16	11	5	27	42	23	1.826	876	726	1.207	Final round
3	Netherlands	16	11	5	27	40	23	1.739	851	745	1.142	Final round
4	United States	16	11	5	27	37	23	1.609	801	708	1.131	Final round
5	Brazil	16	10	6	26	35	26	1.346	783	708	1.106	
6	CIS	16	9	7	25	32	28	1.143	740	711	1.041	

Date		Score		Set 1	Set 2	Set 3	Set 4	Set 5	Total
21 Ago	Netherlands	3–0	United States	15–8	15–4	17–15			47–27
21 Ago	Brazil	3–2	Cuba	11–15	15–12	9–15	15–3	15–11	65–56
21 Ago	Italy	3–2	CIS	14–16	14–16	15–11	15–11	17–15	75–69
22 Ago	Netherlands	3–1	United States	15–10	15–17	15–12	17–15		62–54
22 Ago	Brazil	3–2	Cuba	11–15	15–11	13–15	15–6	15–9	69–56
22 Ago	Italy	3–0	CIS	15–7	15–11	15–4			45–22
28 Ago	Italy	3–2	Netherlands	9–15	15–12	14–16	15–10	15–10	68–63
28 Ago	Cuba	3–0	CIS	15–3	15–9	15–11			45–23
28 Ago	United States	3–0	Brazil	15–12	16–14	15–9			46–35
29 Ago	Netherlands	3–2	Italy	15–10	15–9	5–15	11–15	15–12	61–61
29 Ago	Cuba	3–1	CIS	15–7	14–16	15–6	15–5		59–34
29 Ago	Brazil	3–0	United States	15–11	15–12	15–13			45–36

== Final round ==
- Venue: Palasport di Genova, Genoa, Italy
- All times are Central European Summer Time (UTC+02:00).

Semifinals
4 September
Cuba	3
Netherlands	1
4 September
Italy	3
United States	0

Final
5 September
Cuba	1
Italy	3
3rd place match
5 September
Netherlands	1
United States	3

=== Semifinals ===
Date	Time		Score		Set 1	Set 2	Set 3	Set 4	Set 5	Total
4 Sep	17:30	Cuba	3–1	Netherlands	15–9	15–12	11–15	15–12		56–48
4 Sep	20:00	Italy	3–0	United States	15–10	15–11	15–10			45–31

=== 3rd place match ===
Date	Time		Score		Set 1	Set 2	Set 3	Set 4	Set 5	Total
5 Sep	17:30	Netherlands	1–3	United States	15–9	10–15	6–15	4–15		35–54

=== Final ===
Date	Time		Score		Set 1	Set 2	Set 3	Set 4	Set 5	Total
5 Sep	20:00	Cuba	1–3	Italy	16–14	3–15	11–15	11–15		41–59

== Final standing ==
Rank	Team
1st place, gold medalist(s)	Italy
2nd place, silver medalist(s)	Cuba
3rd place, bronze medalist(s)	United States
4	Netherlands
5	Brazil
6	CIS
7	Canada
8	South Korea
9	China
10	Japan
11	France
12	Germany

1992 World League champions

Italy
3rd title

== Awards ==
- Most valuable player
  - (Italy) Lorenzo Bernardi
- Best spiker
  - (Brazil) Marcelo Negrão
- Best setter
  - (Cuba) Raúl Diago
- Best blocker
  - (Commonwealth of Independent States) Ruslan Olihver
- Best server
  - (Italy) Andrea Zorzi
- Best receiver
  - (China) Xiang Chang
- Best digger
  - (Netherlands) Jan Posthuma
