= 1993 FIVB Volleyball World League =

International volleyball competition

1993 World League
Tournament details
- Host country: Brazil (Final)
- Dates: 21 May – 31 July
- Teams: 12

Final positions
- Champions: Brazil (1st title)

Tournament awards
- MVP: (Brazil) Giovane Gávio

The 1993 FIVB Volleyball World League was the fourth edition of the annual men's international volleyball tournament, played by 12 countries from 21 May to 31 July 1993. The Final Round was held in São Paulo, Brazil.

== Pools composition ==
Pool A	Pool B
Brazil; Germany; Greece; Japan; Russia; United States	China; Cuba; Finland; Italy; Netherlands; South Korea

== Intercontinental round ==
=== Pool A ===
Pos	Team	Pld	W	L	Pts	SW	SL	SR	SPW	SPL	SPR	Qualification
1	Russia	20	16	4	36	51	23	2.217	992	779	1.273	Semifinals
2	Brazil	20	15	5	35	52	18	2.889	987	702	1.406	Semifinals
3	Japan	20	10	10	30	36	41	0.878	930	938	0.991	
4	Germany	20	9	11	29	32	42	0.762	818	959	0.853	
5	United States	20	7	13	27	30	44	0.682	837	938	0.892	
6	Greece	20	3	17	23	21	54	0.389	769	1015	0.758	

Date		Score		Set 1	Set 2	Set 3	Set 4	Set 5	Total
21 May	Russia	3–0	United States	15–6	15–9	15–8			45–23
21 May	Japan	3–2	Greece	11–15	15–12	15–5	4–15	15–13	60–60
21 May	Germany	3–1	Brazil	15–10	15–12	7–15	15–13		52–50
22 May	Russia	3–2	United States	15–6	6–15	15–9	11–15	15–12	62–57
22 May	Japan	3–0	Greece	15–5	15–10	15–6			45–21
22 May	Germany	3–2	Brazil	17–15	2–15	11–15	17–15	17–15	64–75
28 May	Russia	3–0	Germany	15–9	15–11	15–9			45–29
28 May	United States	1–3	Japan	13–15	15–11	9–15	13–15		50–56
28 May	Greece	0–3	Brazil	9–15	8–15	6–15			23–45
29 May	Russia	3–0	Germany	15–5	15–3	15–13			45–21
29 May	United States	3–2	Japan	7–15	4–15	15–10	15–2	15–13	56–55
30 May	Greece	1–3	Brazil	15–6	5–15	6–15	6–15		31–51
4 Jun	Brazil	3–1	Japan	13–15	15–7	17–16	15–13		60–51
4 Jun	United States	3–0	Germany	15–6	15–9	15–12			45–27
4 Jun	Greece	0–3	Russia	11–15	8–15	0–15			19–45
5 Jun	Brazil	3–0	Japan	15–12	16–14	15–11			47–37
5 Jun	United States	3–1	Germany	13–15	15–11	15–13	15–7		58–46
5 Jun	Greece	2–3	Russia	15–10	7–15	15–11	9–15	12–15	58–66
11 Jun	Brazil	3–0	Greece	15–6	15–4	15–4			45–14
11 Jun	Japan	1–3	Russia	11–15	15–9	15–17	7–15		48–56
11 Jun	Germany	3–1	United States	15–8	15–8	13–15	15–7		58–38
12 Jun	Brazil	3–0	Greece	15–7	15–10	15–6			45–23
12 Jun	Japan	0–3	Russia	5–15	10–15	7–15			22–45
12 Jun	Germany	3–0	United States	15–10	15–7	15–5			45–22
18 Jun	Brazil	3–0	United States	15–11	15–10	15–6			45–27
18 Jun	Germany	0–3	Russia	10–15	11–15	6–15			27–45
18 Jun	Greece	3–1	Japan	15–12	13–15	15–5	16–14		59–46
19 Jun	Brazil	3–0	United States	15–9	15–9	15–1			45–19
19 Jun	Germany	1–3	Russia	15–10	7–15	10–15	10–15		42–55
19 Jun	Greece	2–3	Japan	15–3	11–15	12–15	16–14	13–15	67–62
25 Jun	Russia	3–1	Brazil	15–10	17–15	12–15	15–13		59–53
25 Jun	Germany	3–1	Japan	16–14	15–12	7–15	16–14		54–55
25 Jun	United States	3–0	Greece	15–7	15–11	15–3			45–21
26 Jun	Russia	3–1	Brazil	15–10	15–8	10–15	15–12		55–45
26 Jun	Germany	1–3	Japan	15–13	8–15	4–15	9–15		36–58
26 Jun	United States	3–0	Greece	15–7	15–5	15–12			45–24
2 Jul	Japan	0–3	Brazil	11–15	9–15	11–15			31–45
2 Jul	Germany	3–1	Greece	15–7	15–7	3–15	15–5		48–34
2 Jul	United States	2–3	Russia	15–8	15–6	13–15	12–15	11–15	66–59
3 Jul	Japan	3–2	Brazil	13–15	15–5	15–8	6–15	15–11	64–54
3 Jul	Germany	3–2	Greece	15–13	16–14	13–15	5–15	15–13	64–70
3 Jul	United States	3–2	Russia	2–15	7–15	15–9	15–13	15–11	54–63
9 Jul	Russia	3–0	Greece	15–2	15–13	15–8			45–23
9 Jul	Japan	3–0	Germany	15–2	15–3	15–10			45–15
9 Jul	United States	0–3	Brazil	7–15	5–15	3–15			15–45
10 Jul	Russia	3–1	Greece	15–11	8–15	15–4	15–8		53–38
10 Jul	Japan	3–2	Germany	15–11	9–15	15–10	10–15	15–12	64–63
10 Jul	United States	1–3	Brazil	12–15	15–9	13–15	7–15		47–54
16 Jul	Russia	1–3	Japan	9–15	15–7	5–15	12–15		41–52
16 Jul	Brazil	3–0	Germany	15–3	15–5	15–6			45–14
16 Jul	Greece	3–0	United States	15–13	17–15	15–9			47–37
17 Jul	Russia	3–0	Japan	15–2	15–2	15–5			45–9
17 Jul	Brazil	3–0	Germany	15–8	15–2	15–3			45–13
17 Jul	Greece	3–2	United States	15–11	15–11	9–15	15–17	17–15	71–69
25 Jul	Brazil	3–0	Russia	15–13	15–8	15–8			45–29
25 Jul	Japan	0–3	United States	8–15	4–15	13–15			25–45
25 Jul	Greece	1–3	Germany	10–15	15–9	13–15	7–15		45–54
26 Jul	Brazil	3–0	Russia	17–15	16–14	15–5			48–34
26 Jul	Japan	3–0	United States	15–4	15–7	15–8			45–19
26 Jul	Greece	0–3	Germany	5–15	6–15	10–15			21–45

=== Pool B ===
Pos	Team	Pld	W	L	Pts	SW	SL	SR	SPW	SPL	SPR	Qualification
1	Italy	20	19	1	39	59	14	4.214	1042	694	1.501	Semifinals
2	Cuba	20	16	4	36	53	20	2.650	1008	745	1.353	Semifinals
3	Netherlands	20	10	10	30	42	33	1.273	927	880	1.053	
4	China	20	9	11	29	36	40	0.900	897	954	0.940	
5	South Korea	20	5	15	25	18	49	0.367	718	892	0.805	
6	Finland	20	1	19	21	5	57	0.088	480	907	0.529	

Date		Score		Set 1	Set 2	Set 3	Set 4	Set 5	Total
21 May	Italy	3–0	Netherlands	15–6	15–3	15–10			45–19
21 May	Cuba	2–3	China	13–15	12–15	15–8	15–3	16–18	71–59
21 May	South Korea	3–0	Finland	15–5	15–7	15–2			45–14
22 May	Italy	3–2	Netherlands	13–15	5–15	15–5	15–10	15–7	63–52
22 May	Cuba	3–0	China	15–11	15–12	15–3			45–26
22 May	South Korea	3–0	Finland	15–7	15–7	15–7			45–21
28 May	Italy	3–1	Cuba	8–15	15–11	15–12	15–5		53–43
28 May	China	3–2	Netherlands	13–15	14–16	15–11	15–13	15–5	72–60
28 May	Finland	0–3	South Korea	9–15	9–15	5–15			23–45
29 May	Italy	2–3	Cuba	15–3	10–15	8–15	15–13	20–22	68–68
29 May	China	1–3	Netherlands	8–15	10–15	15–6	9–15		42–51
29 May	Finland	3–0	South Korea	17–15	15–5	15–10			47–30
4 Jun	Cuba	3–0	Finland	15–7	15–10	15–5			45–22
4 Jun	Netherlands	1–3	Italy	6–15	8–15	15–13	7–15		36–58
4 Jun	South Korea	1–3	China	10–15	15–5	6–15	14–16		45–51
5 Jun	Cuba	3–0	Finland	15–11	15–5	15–5			45–21
5 Jun	Netherlands	1–3	Italy	15–13	10–15	9–15	5–15		39–58
5 Jun	South Korea	3–2	China	11–15	15–8	2–15	15–9	15–12	58–59
11 Jun	Italy	3–2	China	13–15	13–15	15–6	16–14	19–17	76–67
11 Jun	South Korea	3–2	Netherlands	15–12	13–15	6–15	16–14	15–10	65–66
11 Jun	Finland	1–3	Cuba	6–15	8–15	15–10	9–15		38–55
12 Jun	Italy	3–0	China	15–10	15–6	15–11			45–27
12 Jun	South Korea	0–3	Netherlands	8–15	6–15	6–15			20–45
12 Jun	Finland	0–3	Cuba	13–15	8–15	3–15			24–45
18 Jun	Italy	3–0	South Korea	15–13	15–12	15–12			45–37
18 Jun	Netherlands	1–3	Cuba	12–15	15–11	10–15	8–15		45–56
18 Jun	China	3–0	Finland	15–11	15–8	15–5			45–24
19 Jun	Italy	3–0	South Korea	15–6	15–9	15–12			45–27
19 Jun	Netherlands	1–3	Cuba	3–15	16–14	8–15	4–15		31–59
19 Jun	China	3–0	Finland	15–11	15–4	15–6			45–21
25 Jun	Cuba	3–0	South Korea	15–3	15–4	15–11			45–23
25 Jun	Netherlands	3–1	China	15–6	15–11	14–16	15–6		59–39
25 Jun	Finland	0–3	Italy	4–15	6–15	6–15			16–45
26 Jun	Cuba	3–0	South Korea	15–8	15–4	15–11			45–23
26 Jun	Netherlands	3–0	China	15–7	15–6	15–8			45–21
26 Jun	Finland	0–3	Italy	7–15	7–15	2–15			16–45
2 Jul	Cuba	3–2	Netherlands	10–15	16–14	12–15	15–12	15–13	68–69
2 Jul	South Korea	0–3	Italy	9–15	9–15	10–15			28–45
2 Jul	Finland	0–3	China	5–15	3–15	8–15			16–45
3 Jul	Cuba	3–0	Netherlands	15–3	15–12	15–11			45–26
3 Jul	South Korea	0–3	Italy	12–15	9–15	10–15			31–45
3 Jul	Finland	1–3	China	11–15	13–15	15–9	11–15		50–54
9 Jul	Netherlands	3–0	Finland	15–8	15–11	15–11			45–30
9 Jul	China	1–3	Italy	15–13	13–15	8–15	4–15		40–58
9 Jul	South Korea	0–3	Cuba	5–15	11–15	11–15			27–45
10 Jul	Netherlands	3–0	Finland	15–3	15–3	17–16			47–22
10 Jul	China	1–3	Italy	15–9	10–15	13–15	3–15		41–54
10 Jul	South Korea	0–3	Cuba	5–15	11–15	11–15			27–45
16 Jul	Italy	3–0	Finland	15–9	15–2	15–0			45–11
16 Jul	Netherlands	3–0	South Korea	15–8	15–8	15–12			45–28
16 Jul	China	1–3	Cuba	3–15	13–15	15–10	7–15		38–55
17 Jul	Italy	3–0	Finland	15–6	15–3	15–4			45–13
17 Jul	Netherlands	3–1	South Korea	15–7	11–15	15–6	15–10		56–38
17 Jul	China	0–3	Cuba	6–15	8–15	7–15			21–45
26 Jul	Cuba	1–3	Italy	11–15	5–15	15–6	8–15		39–51
26 Jul	China	3–1	South Korea	15–8	13–15	15–11	15–7		58–41
26 Jul	Finland	0–3	Netherlands	7–15	9–15	5–15			21–45
27 Jul	Cuba	1–3	Italy	11–15	15–8	12–15	6–15		44–53
27 Jul	China	3–0	South Korea	17–15	15–13	15–7			47–35
27 Jul	Finland	0–3	Netherlands	11–15	14–16	5–15			30–46

== Final round ==
- Venue: Ginásio do Ibirapuera, São Paulo, Brazil

Semifinals
30 July
Brazil	3
Italy	0
30 July
Russia	3
Cuba	1

Final
31 July
Brazil	3
Russia	0
3rd place match
31 July
Italy	3
Cuba	0

=== Semifinals ===
Date		Score		Set 1	Set 2	Set 3	Set 4	Set 5	Total
30 Jul	Brazil	3–0	Italy	15–11	15–11	15–9			45–31
30 Jul	Russia	3–1	Cuba	15–10	15–13	12–15	15–9		57–47

=== 3rd place match ===
Date		Score		Set 1	Set 2	Set 3	Set 4	Set 5	Total
31 Jul	Italy	3–0	Cuba	15–12	15–11	15–12			45–35

=== Final ===
Date		Score		Set 1	Set 2	Set 3	Set 4	Set 5	Total
31 Jul	Brazil	3–0	Russia	15–2	15–13	15–9			45–24

== Final standing ==
Rank	Team
1st place, gold medalist(s)	Brazil
2nd place, silver medalist(s)	Russia
3rd place, bronze medalist(s)	Italy
4	Cuba
5	Netherlands
6	Japan
7	China
8	Germany
9	United States
10	South Korea
11	Greece
12	Finland

1993 World League champions

Brazil
1st title

== Awards ==
- Most valuable player
  - (Brazil) Giovane Gávio
- Best spiker
  - (Russia) Dmitriy Fomin
- Best setter
  - (Brazil) Mauricio Lima
- Best blocker
  - (Russia) Oleg Shatunov
- Best server
  - (Russia) Dmitriy Fomin
- Best receiver
  - (Brazil) Gilmar Teixeira
- Best digger
  - (Italy) Damiano Pippi
