= Serbia men's national volleyball team =

Men's national volleyball team representing Serbia

Serbia
- Nickname(s): Orlovi (The Eagles)
- Association: Volleyball Federation of Serbia
- Confederation: CEV
- Head coach: Gheorghe Crețu
- FIVB ranking: 18 ▼5 (1 October 2026)

Uniforms
Home	Away

Summer Olympics
- Appearances: 6 (First in 1996)
- Best result: (2000)

World Championship
- Appearances: 11 (First in 1956)
- Best result: (1998)

World Cup
- Appearances: 3 (First in 1965)
- Best result: (2003)

European Championship
- Appearances: 30 (First in 1951)
- Best result: (2001, 2011, 2019)
Honours
Event	1st	2nd	3rd
Olympic Games	1	0	1
World Championship	0	1	1
World Cup	0	0	1
World Grand Champions Cup	0	0	1
World League	1	5	3
European Championship	3	1	8
Mediterranean Games	5	1	1
Total	10	8	16
Representing Yugoslavia / Serbia and Montenegro / Serbia
Olympic Games
Gold medal – first place	2000 Sydney	Team
Bronze medal – third place	1996 Atlanta	Team
World Championship
Silver medal – second place	1998 Japan	
Bronze medal – third place	2010 Italy	
World Cup
Bronze medal – third place	2003 Japan	
World Grand Champions Cup
Bronze medal – third place	2001 Japan	
World League
Gold medal – first place	2016 Kraków	
Silver medal – second place	2003 Madrid	
Silver medal – second place	2005 Belgrade	
Silver medal – second place	2008 Rio de Janeiro	
Silver medal – second place	2009 Belgrade	
Silver medal – second place	2015 Rio de Janeiro	
Bronze medal – third place	2002 Belo Horizonte	
Bronze medal – third place	2004 Rome	
Bronze medal – third place	2010 Córdoba	
European Championship
Gold medal – first place	2001 Czech Republic	
Gold medal – first place	2011 Austria/Czech Republic	
Gold medal – first place	2019 France/Slovenia/Belgium/Netherlands	
Silver medal – second place	1997 Netherlands	
Bronze medal – third place	1975 Yugoslavia	
Bronze medal – third place	1979 France	
Bronze medal – third place	1995 Greece	
Bronze medal – third place	1999 Austria	
Bronze medal – third place	2005 Italy/Serbia and Montenegro	
Bronze medal – third place	2007 Russia	
Bronze medal – third place	2013 Denmark/Poland	
Bronze medal – third place	2017 Poland	
Mediterranean Games
Gold medal – first place	1963 Naples	
Gold medal – first place	1967 Tunis	
Gold medal – first place	1971 İzmir	
Gold medal – first place	1975 Algiers	
Gold medal – first place	1979 Split	
Silver medal – second place	1991 Athens	
Bronze medal – third place	2005 Almería	
Memorial of Hubert Jerzy Wagner
Silver medal – second place	2016 Kraków	
Bronze medal – third place	2009 Łódź	
Bronze medal – third place	2019 Kraków	

The Serbia men's national volleyball team represents Serbia in international men's volleyball. FIVB and the CEV consider Serbia the inheritor of the records of SFR Yugoslavia (1948–1991) and Serbia and Montenegro (1992–2006). Serbia won gold at the Summer Olympics in Sydney, Australia and bronze at the 1996 Summer Olympics in Atlanta.

The Yugoslav Olympic Committee declared the national volleyball team to be the best male team of the year in 2000, and the Olympic Committee of Serbia did the same in 2010 and 2013.

== History ==
Serbia's most proud moment came at the Sydney Olympics in 2000 when under the name Yugoslavia it won Olympic gold. A heavy favourite was team Italy, who won the last three World Championships and the European title in 1995 and 1999, but they had yet to win an Olympic gold medal. They swept through Group B undefeated and won their quarter-final match over Australia. In the semifinals, Serbia & Montenegro (Yugoslavia), runners-up at the 1998 Worlds, and bronze medalists at the 1999 Europeans, triumphed in straight sets, again denying Italy an Olympic gold medal. Serbia & Montenegro had struggled in the pools, finishing only third behind Italy and Russia, but they defeated Russia in straight sets in the final to win the gold medal. As in 1996, all medalists came from the same pool, this time Group B.

Volleyball was brought to Serbia by g. William Viland, a professor of folklore and folk sports from Oakland, California, when the Red Cross held a series of lectures and demonstrations of American sports in Belgrade and Novi Sad. It is believed that his arrival marked the beginning of volleyball in this area, and in 1924 is considered the year when the first volleyball ball came to Serbia. During the period of occupation, between 1941 and 1944, volleyball was played very actively, numerous competitions were held, and more sports clubs/society's had established its volleyball section.

The Serbian/Yugoslav Volleyball Federation was founded in 1946 by the Alliance for Physical Education of Yugoslavia. A year later, in 1947, the International Volleyball Federation (FIVB) was founded and the former Yugoslavia was one of the 14 founders. From 13 February 1949, the Volleyball Federation became an independent sports organization. Two years later, at the European Championships held in Paris, the women's volleyball team of Yugoslavia won the bronze medal for the first time. This success was repeated with the men's event in 1975, when Serbia for the first time in history hosted the biggest European competition, both the men's and women's events. The Serbian team in the last match of the final group defeated Bulgaria in the crowded hall of "Pioneer" in Belgrade and won the bronze medal.

=== 2011 – 2019 ===
In 2011 Serbia became European champion and in 2016 the champion of FIVB World League for the first time, with Marko Ivović being crowned MVP of the tournament and Srećko Lisinac being chosen as the Best Middle Blocker.

=== 2019 – 2021 ===
After two bronze medal 2013 and 2017, Serbia become European champion again in 2019 with Uroš Kovačević being crowned MVP of the tournament.

== Medals ==
Event	Gold	Silver	Bronze	Total
Olympic Games	1	0	1	2
World Championship	0	1	1	2
World Cup	0	0	1	1
World Grand Champions Cup	0	0	1	1
World League	1	5	3	9
European Championship	3	1	8	12
Mediterranean Games	5	1	1	7
Total	10	8	16	34

== Results ==
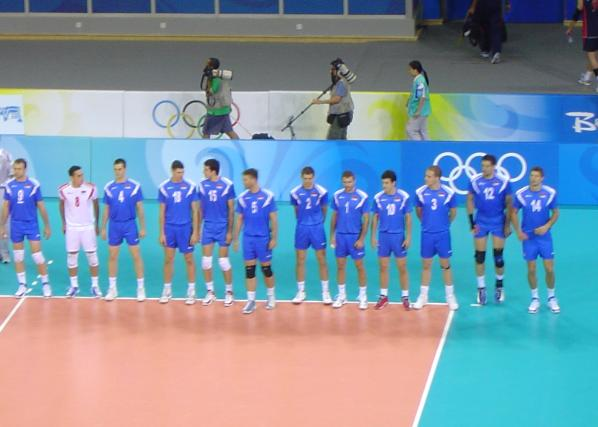
Serbia team in 2008 Olympic

=== Olympic Games ===
Champions Runners up Third place Fourth place

Games	Round	Position	Pld	W	L	SF	SA	Squad
1964 to 1988	part of Yugoslavia							
(Spain) 1992 Barcelona	suspended							
(United States) 1996 Atlanta	Semifinals	3rd	8	5	3	16	14	Squad
(Australia) 2000 Sydney	Final	1st	8	6	2	21	11	Squad
(Greece) 2004 Athens	Quarterfinals	5th	6	4	2	13	9	Squad
as Serbia 2007–
(China) 2008 Beijing	Quarterfinals	5th	6	2	4	11	13	Squad
(United Kingdom) 2012 London	Preliminary round	9th	5	1	4	7	13	Squad
(Brazil) 2016 Rio de Janeiro	did not qualify							
(Japan) 2020 Tokyo	did not qualify							
(France) 2024 Paris	Preliminary round	9th	3	1	2	5	8	Squad
(United States) 2028 Los Angeles	Future event							
(Australia) 2032 Brisbane	Future event							
Total	6/9	1 Title	36	19	17	73	68	—

=== World Championship ===
Champions Runners up Third place Fourth place

Games	Round	Position	Pld	W	L	SF	SA	Squad
1949 to 1990	part of Yugoslavia							
(Greece) 1994	suspended							
(Japan) 1998	Final	2nd	12	10	2	31	10	Squad
(Argentina) 2002	Semifinals	4th	9	7	2	22	8	Squad
(Japan) 2006	Semifinals	4th	11	8	3	26	13	Squad
as Serbia 2007–
(Italy) 2010	Semifinals	3rd	9	6	3	22	13	Squad
(Poland) 2014	Second round	9th	9	5	4	18	15	Squad
(Italy) (Bulgaria) 2018	Semifinals	4th	12	7	5	24	21	Squad
(Poland) (Slovenia) 2022	Round of 16	9th	4	3	1	9	3	Squad
(Philippines) 2025	Round of 16	10th	4	2	2	8	6	Squad
(Poland) 2027	Qualified							
(Qatar) 2029	Future event							
Total	8/9	0 Title(s)	70	48	22	160	89	—

=== World Cup ===
Champions Runners up Third place Fourth place

Year	Rank	Pld	W	L	SW	SL
1965 to 1991	part of Yugoslavia					
(Japan) 1995	did not qualify					
(Japan) 1999	did not qualify					
(Japan) 2003	3rd place	11	9	2	29	10
(Japan) 2007	did not qualify					
(Japan) 2011	8th place	11	5	6	20	23
(Japan) 2015	did not qualify					
(Japan) 2019	did not qualify					
Total	3/8	29	17	12	59	46

==== Squads ====
- 2003 Japan – Bronze medal
  Marić, Janić, Boškan, Mijić, N. Grbić (C), V. Grbić, Bjelica, Gerić, Vujević, Miljković, Ilić, Vusurović. Head coach: Travica

=== World Grand Champions Cup ===
Champions Runners up Third place Fourth place

Year	Rank	Pld	W	L	SW	SL
(Japan) 1993	suspended					
(Japan) 1997	did not qualify					
(Japan) 2001	3rd place	5	3	2	9	7
(Japan) 2005	did not qualify					
(Japan) 2009	did not qualify					
(Japan) 2013	did not qualify					
(Japan) 2017	did not qualify					
Total	1/7	5	3	2	9	7

- (Japan) 2001 – Bronze medal
  Jokanović, Majdak, Škorić, Boškan, Mijić, N. Grbić (C), V. Grbić, Gerić, Vujević, Miljković, Vusurović. Head coach: Gajić

=== World League ===
Champions Runners up Third place Fourth place

Year	Rank	Pld	W	L	SW	SL
(Japan) 1990	part of Yugoslavia					
(Italy) 1991	part of Yugoslavia					
(Italy) 1992	suspended					
(Brazil) 1993	suspended					
(Italy) 1994	suspended					
(Brazil) 1995	did not enter					
(Netherlands) 1996	did not enter					
(Russia) 1997	7th place	12	8	4	29	15
(Italy) 1998	6th place	14	4	10	23	32
(Argentina) 1999	withdrew					
(Netherlands) 2000	4th place	18	12	6	43	26
(Poland) 2001	4th place	17	11	6	39	23
(Brazil) 2002	3rd place	17	11	6	42	24
(Spain) 2003	2nd place	17	12	5	44	24
(Italy) 2004	3rd place	15	11	4	37	20
(Serbia and Montenegro) 2005	2nd place	15	8	7	31	31
(Russia) 2006	5th place	15	10	5	32	26
as Serbia 2007–
(Poland) 2007	9th place	12	7	5	24	18
(Brazil) 2008	2nd place	16	10	6	39	24
(Serbia) 2009	2nd place	16	11	5	38	25
(Argentina) 2010	3rd place	16	11	5	40	26
(Poland) 2011	9th place	12	7	5	26	21
(Bulgaria) 2012	9th place	12	6	6	27	24
(Argentina) 2013	8th place	10	5	5	22	22
(Italy) 2014	7th place	12	7	5	24	20
(Brazil) 2015	2nd place	16	9	7	38	32
(Poland) 2016	1st place	13	10	3	34	17
(Brazil) 2017	5th place	11	6	5	24	20
Total	21/28	286	176	110	656	470

==== Squads ====
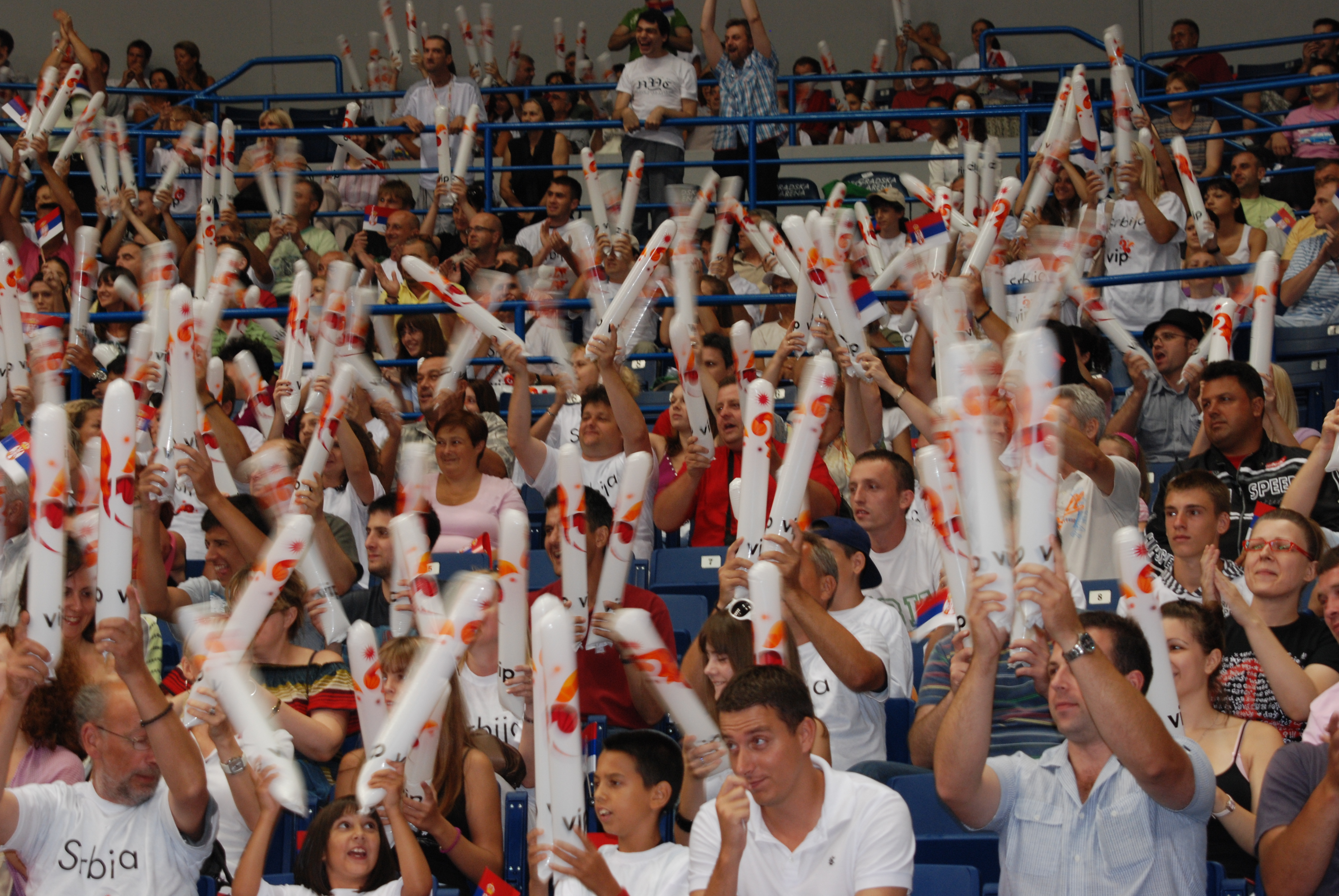
Serbia fans in 2009 world league

- (Brazil) 2015 Rio de Janeiro – Silver medal
  Kovačević N., Kovačević U., Ivović, Petrić, Kostić, Stanković (C), Jovović, Atanasijević, Starović, Majstorović, Podraščanin, Rosić, Lisinac, Okolić. Head coach: Grbić
- (Poland) 2016 Kraków – Gold medal
  Okolić, Kovačević, Katić, Stanković (C), Ivović, Jovović, Nikić, Dokić, Luburić, Brđović, Majstorović, Podraščanin, Rosić, Lisinac. Head coach: Grbić

=== Nations League ===
Year	Rank	GP	MW	ML	SW	SL	PW	PL	Squad
(France) 2018	5th place	17	11	6	33	30	1404	1408	Squad
(United States) 2019	11th place	15	6	9	28	36	1393	1417	Squad
(Italy) 2021	6th place	15	10	5	35	27	1419	1341	Squad
(Italy) 2022	11th place	12	5	7	19	27	1010	1043	Squad
(Poland) 2023	9th place	12	6	6	23	23	1045	1056	Squad
(Poland) 2024	10th place	12	5	7	23	26	1051	1094	Squad
(China) 2025	16th place	12	3	9	15	29	926	1038	Squad
(China) 2026	12th place	12	5	7	19	25	961	1037	Squad
(N/A) 2027	qualified								
Total	9/9	107	51	56	195	223	9209	9434	—

=== Record by opponent ===
FIVB Men's Volleyball Nations League matches (by team)
Opponent	%	GP	MW	ML	SW	SL	SL
South Korea	1.000	1	1	0	3	0	Max
Ukraine	1.000	2	2	0	6	1	6.000
Bulgaria	1.000	6	6	0	18	3	6.000
Belgium	1.000	1	1	0	3	1	3.000
Australia	1.000	4	4	0	12	5	2.400
Netherlands	1.000	3	3	0	9	4	2.250
Portugal	1.000	1	1	0	3	2	1.500
Canada	.833	6	5	1	17	9	1.889
China	.800	5	4	1	12	6	2.000
Cuba	.750	4	3	1	10	8	1.250
Turkey	.667	3	2	1	6	5	1.200
Iran	.500	6	3	3	11	14	0.786
Germany	.375	8	3	5	16	18	0.889
Argentina	.375	8	3	5	13	19	0.684
Poland	.333	6	2	4	11	12	0.917
Russia	.333	3	1	2	6	8	0.750
Japan	.286	7	2	5	9	17	0.529
Slovenia	.167	6	1	5	8	16	0.500
Italy	.167	6	1	5	3	16	0.188
United States	.143	7	1	6	8	19	0.421
France	.143	7	1	6	6	20	0.300
Brazil	.143	7	1	6	5	20	0.250
Total (22 teams)		107^	51	56	195	223	

- ^All statistics current through the end of 2026 edition.

=== European Championship ===
Champions Runners up Third place Fourth place

Year	Round	Position	Pld	W	L	SW	SL
1948 to 1991	part of Yugoslavia						
(Finland) 1993	suspended						
(Greece) 1995	Semifinals	Bronze medal	7	5	2	16	7
(Netherlands) 1997	Final	Silver medal	7	5	2	16	7
(Austria) 1999	Semifinals	Bronze medal	5	3	2	11	8
(Czech Republic) 2001	Final	Gold medal	7	6	1	20	6
(Germany) 2003	Semifinals	4th	7	4	3	17	11
(Italy) (Serbia and Montenegro) 2005	Semifinals	Bronze medal	7	6	1	20	6
as Serbia 2007–
(Russia) 2007	Semifinals	Bronze medal	8	5	3	18	13
(Turkey) 2009	Second Round	5th	6	4	2	15	8
(Austria) (Czech Republic) 2011	Final	Gold medal	6	6	0	18	5
(Denmark) (Poland) 2013	Semifinals	Bronze medal	7	5	2	17	9
(Bulgaria) (Italy) 2015	Quarterfinals	7th	5	3	2	11	10
(Poland) 2017	Semifinals	Bronze medal	6	5	1	17	7
(France) (Slovenia) (Belgium) (Netherlands) 2019	Final	Gold medal	9	9	0	27	6
(Czech Republic) (Finland) (Estonia) (Poland) 2021	Semifinals	4th	9	6	3	21	15
(Italy) (Bulgaria) (North Macedonia) (Israel) 2023	Quarterfinals	6th	7	5	2	16	8
(Bulgaria) (Finland) (Italy) (Romania) 2026	Round of 16	13th	6	3	3	9	14
(N/A) (N/A) (N/A) (Montenegro) 2028	To be determined						
Total	3 Titles	17/19	109	80	29	269	140

==== Squads ====
- (Greece) 1995 – Bronze medal
  Boškan, Brđović, Đurić, Gerić, N. Grbić, V. Grbić, Jokanović, Kovač, Mešter, Petrović, Tanasković, Vujević. Head Coach: Gajić
- (Netherlands) 1997 – Silver medal
  Batez, Boškan, Đurić, Gerić, N. Grbić, V. Grbić, Jokanović, Kovač, Mešter, Tanasković, Vujević, Vušurović. Head Coach: Gajić
- (Austria) 1999 – Bronze medal
  Batez, Boškan, Đurić, Gerić, N. Grbić, V. Grbić, Mešter, Mijić, Miljković, Petković, Tanasković, Vujević. Head Coach: Gajić
- (Czech Republic) 2001 – Gold medal
  Boškan, Gerić, N. Grbić, V. Grbić, Jokanović, Marić, Mešter, Mijić, Miljković, Škorić, Vujević, Vušurović. Head Coach: Gajić
- (Italy) (Serbia and Montenegro) 2005 – Bronze medal
  Bjelica, Bojović, Boškan, Gerić, Ilić, Janić, Miljković, Mitrović, Samardžić, Stanković, Vujević. Head coach: Travica
- (Russia) 2007 – Bronze medal
  Kovačević, Janić, Petković, Boškan, Stanković, Samardžić, Grbić, Nikić, Gerić, Miljković, Starović, Podraščanin. Head coach: Kolaković
- (Austria) (Czech Republic) 2011 – Gold medal
  N. Kovačević, U. Kovačević, Petković, Terzić, Stanković, Vujić, Nikić, Mitić, Rašić, Miljković, Starović, Atanasijević, Podraščanin, Rosić. Head Coach: Kolaković
- (Denmark) (Poland) 2013 – Bronze medal
  Kovačević, Ivović, Petrić, Petković, Stanković, Vujić, Jovović, Nikić, Rašić, Atanasijević, Starović, Podraščanin, Rosić, Lisinac. Head coach: Kolaković
- (Poland) 2017 – Bronze medal
  Okolić, Kovačević, Katić, Petrić (C), Škundrić, Stanković, Jovović, Buculjević, Atanasijević, Luburić, Majstorović, Podraščanin, Rosić, Lisinac. Head coach: Grbić
- (France) (Slovenia) (Belgium) (Netherlands) 2019 – Gold medal
  Okolić, Kovačević, Petrić (C), Ćirović, Peković, Krsmanović, Ivović, Jovović, Atanasijević, Luburić, Majstorović, Podraščanin, Lisinac, Todorović. Head coach: Kovač

=== European Games ===
Year	Rank	Pld	W	L	SW	SL
(Azerbaijan) 2015 Baku	5th	6	2	4	11	9
(Belarus) 2019 Minsk	volleyball tournament not held					
(Poland) 2023 Kraków	volleyball tournament not held					
(Turkey) 2027 Istanbul	Future event					
(N/A) 2031	Future event					
Total	1/1	6	2	4	11	9

=== Mediterranean Games ===
Champions Runners up Third place Fourth place

Year	Rank	Pld	W	L	SW	SL
1963 to 1991	part of Yugoslavia					
(France) 1993	suspended					
(Italy) 1997	did not enter					
(Tunisia) 2001	6th place	5	2	3	8	9
(Spain) 2005	3rd place	5	4	1	13	6
as Serbia 2007–
(Italy) 2009	did not enter					
(Turkey) 2013	did not enter					
(Spain) 2018	did not enter					
(Algeria) 2022	9th place	3	0	3	2	9
(Italy) 2026	7th place	5	2	3	8	11
(Kosovo) 2030	future event					
Total	4/9	18	8	10	31	35

== Results and fixtures ==
=== 2021 ===
2021 (W–L 17–10)
Date	Time	Opponent			Result						
2020 European Olympic Qualification Tournament
5 Jan	13:30	France	3–0	Serbia	25–21	25–21	25–22			75–64	Report
6 Jan	14:00	Netherlands	0–3	Serbia	18–25	18–25	17–25			53–75	Report
8 Jan	14:30	Serbia	2–3	Bulgaria	21–25	26–24	22–25	25–20	13–15	107–109	Report
2021 FIVB Volleyball Men's Nations League
28 May	15:00	Serbia	3–1	Slovenia	22–25	25–18	36–34	25–18		108–95	P2Report
29 May	16:00	Poland	3–1	Serbia	26–24	25–19	21–25	25–15		97–83	P2Report
30 May	21:00	Serbia	3–1	Italy	25–23	22–25	25–22	25–18		97–88	P2Report
3 Jun	13:00	Japan	1–3	Serbia	25–18	23–25	22–25	13–25		83–93	P2Report
4 Jun	15:00	Serbia	3–2	France	22–25	24–26	25–22	25–23	15–9	111–105	P2Report
5 Jun	15:00	Brazil	3–1	Serbia	23–25	25–23	25–15	25–22		98–85	P2Report
9 Jun	10:00	Serbia	3–1	Germany	19–25	25–22	25–18	25–15		94–80	P2Report
10 Jun	10:00	Serbia	3–2	Iran	21–25	25–15	26–28	25–22	15–8	112–98	P2Report
11 Jun	18:00	United States	1–3	Serbia	23–25	17–25	25–19	25–27		90–96	P2Report
15 Jun	10:00	Russia	3–1	Serbia	25–23	25–22	22–25	25–21		97–91	P2Report
16 Jun	12:00	Serbia	3–0	Bulgaria	25–20	25–17	25–17			75–54	P2Report
17 Jun	10:00	Argentina	3–0	Serbia	27–25	25–20	26–24			78–69	P2Report
21 Jun	10:00	Australia	1–3	Serbia	16–25	13–25	25–19	15–25		69–94	P2Report
22 Jun	12:00	Serbia	3–2	Netherlands	25–21	21–25	25–18	21–25	17–15	109–104	P2Report
23 Jun	12:00	Canada	3–2	Serbia	17–25	21–25	25–17	25–20	17–15	105–102	P2Report
2021 Men's European Volleyball Championship
2 Sep	20:30	Belgium	1–3	Serbia	13–25	18–25	25–21	20–25		76–96	Report
3 Sep	20:30	Ukraine	0–3	Serbia	25–27	24–26	21–25			70–78	Report
4 Sep	20:30	Serbia	2–3	Poland	21–25	25–23	25–20	20–25	14–16	105–109	Report
6 Sep	17:30	Portugal	1–3	Serbia	15–25	21–25	25–22	17–25		78–97	Report
7 Sep	17:30	Serbia	3–2	Greece	25–23	22–25	25–16	28–30	15–5	115–99	Report
12 Sep	20:30	Serbia	3–2	Turkey	25–18	22–25	22–25	25–23	15–12	109–103	Report
14 Sep	17:30	Netherlands	0–3	Serbia	23–25	20–25	25–27			68–77	Report
18 Sep	21:00	Serbia	1–3	Italy	27–29	22–25	25–23	18–25		92–102	Report
19 Sep	17:30	Poland	3–0	Serbia	25–22	25–16	25–22			75–60	Report

=== 2022 ===
2022 (W–L 9–10)
Date	Time	Opponent			Result						
2022 FIVB Volleyball Men's Nations League
7 Jun	16:30	Bulgaria	1–3	Serbia	25–19	19–25	22–25	20–25		86–94	P2 Report
9 Jun	16:30	Serbia	1–3	France	25–21	22–25	23–25	23–25		93–96	P2 Report
10 Jun	11:00	Serbia	3–2	Argentina	25–16	25–18	17–25	12–25	15–6	94–90	P2 Report
11 Jun	13:00	Germany	3–2	Serbia	27–25	25–27	18–25	28–26	18–16	116–119	P2 Report
22 Jun	20:00	Serbia	1–3	United States	24–26	25–23	23–25	20–25		92–99	P2 Report
23 Jun	16:30	Serbia	0–3	Brazil	18–25	24–26	17–25			59–76	P2 Report
24 Jun	13:30	Serbia	3–2	Canada	20–25	19–25	25–20	26–24	15–11	105–105	P2 Report
26 Jun	13:30	Serbia	3–0	Australia	25–17	25–20	25–22			75–59	P2 Report
6 Jul	20:00	Slovenia	3–0	Serbia	25–15	25–19	25–23			75–57	P2 Report
8 Jul	20:00	Italy	3–0	Serbia	25–21	25–14	25–23			75–58	P2 Report
9 Jul	17:00	Iran	3–0	Serbia	35–33	25–21	25–12			85–66	P2 Report
10 Jul	14:00	China	1–3	Serbia	17–25	17–25	25–23	22–25		81–98	P2 Report
2022 Hubert Jerzy Wagner Memorial
18 Aug	17:30	Argentina	3–1	Serbia	25–21	19–25	25–22	25–18		94–86	Report
19 Aug	17:30	Iran	2–3	Serbia	21–25	25–20	20–25	26–24	10–15	102–109	Report
20 Aug	18:30	Poland	3–0	Serbia	25–22	25–23	25–22			75–67	Report
2022 FIVB Volleyball Men's World Championship
27 Aug	20:30	Ukraine	0–3	Serbia	26–28	21–25	20–25			67–78	P2 Report
29 Aug	17:30	Serbia	3–0	Puerto Rico	26–24	25–21	25–16			76–61	P2 Report
31 Aug	17:30	Serbia	3–0	Tunisia	29–27	25–15	25–17			79–59	P2 Report
6 Sep	17:30	Serbia	0–3	Argentina	23–25	21–25	23–25			67–75	P2 Report

=== 2023 ===
2023 (W–L 14–12)
Date	Time	Opponent			Result						
2023 FIVB Volleyball Men's Nations League
7 Jun	15:00	Slovenia	3–1	Serbia	31–29	19–25	25–20	25–21		100–95	P2 Report
8 Jun	15:00	Serbia	3–0	China	34–32	25–16	25–20			84–68	P2 Report
9 Jun	19:40	Japan	3–1	Serbia	22–25	25–21	25–23	25–20		97–89	P2 Report
11 Jun	15:40	Serbia	3–0	Poland	25–21	25–19	25–14			75–54	P2 Report
20 Jun	16:30	United States	3–1	Serbia	22–25	25–19	25–19	25–21		97–84	P2 Report
22 Jun	16:30	Serbia	3–1	Germany	25–21	20–25	25–23	25–23		95–92	P2 Report
23 Jun	20:00	Serbia	0–3	Italy	11–25	21–25	20–25			52–75	P2 Report
25 Jun	16:00	Netherlands	2–3	Serbia	25–22	21–25	25–21	33–35	9–15	113–118	P2 Report
4 Jul	13:00	Argentina	3–1	Serbia	19–25	25–16	25–19	25–18		94–78	P2 Report
6 Jul	17:00	Serbia	3–2	Cuba	19–25	25–23	25–21	22–25	15–11	106–105	P2 Report
7 Jul	13:30	Serbia	1–3	France	25–20	23–25	20–25	26–28		94–98	P2 Report
8 Jul	13:30	Bulgaria	0–3	Serbia	19–25	22–25	22–25			63–75	P2 Report
2023 Men's European Volleyball Championship
30 Aug	21:00	Switzerland	0–3	Serbia	19–25	16–25	19–25			54–75	P2 Report
31 Aug	18:00	Serbia	3–1	Belgium	25–22	18–25	25–20	25–20		93–87	P2 Report
1 Sep	21:00	Serbia	0–3	Italy	15–25	19–25	21–25			55–75	P2 Report
4 Sep	18:00	Serbia	3–0	Estonia	25–16	25–23	25–22			75–61	P2 Report
5 Sep	21:00	Germany	1–3	Serbia	22–25	25–20	22–25	19–25		88–95	P2 Report
10 Sep	18:00	Serbia	3–0	Czech Republic	25–21	26–24	25–21			76–66	P2 Report
12 Sep	18:00	Poland	3–1	Serbia	26–28	25–15	36–34	25–17		112–94	P2 Report
2023 FIVB Volleyball Men's World Cup
30 Sep	13:00	Serbia	1–3	Turkey	22–25	25–20	14–25	20–25		81–95	P2 Report
1 Oct	13:00	Serbia	3–0	Tunisia	25–21	25–16	25–21			75–58	P2 Report
3 Oct	13:00	Serbia	3–1	Egypt	18–25	25–19	25–14	25–16		93–74	P2 Report
4 Oct	13:00	Serbia	3–0	Finland	25–21	25–22	25–22			75–65	P2 Report
6 Oct	19:25	Japan	3–0	Serbia	25–17	25–14	25–22			75–53	P2 Report
7 Oct	16:00	United States	3–0	Serbia	25–18	25–18	25–17			75–53	P2 Report
8 Oct	16:00	Slovenia	3–0	Serbia	25–22	25–23	25–21			75–66	P2 Report

=== 2024 ===
2024 (W–L 6–9)
Date	Time	Opponent			Result						
2024 FIVB Volleyball Men's Nations League
22 May	21:00	Iran	1–3	Serbia	25–27	25–17	19–25	18–25		87–94	P2 Report
23 May	17:30	Japan	3–0	Serbia	25–20	25–16	25–22			75–58	P2 Report
24 May	21:00	Serbia	1–3	Brazil	21–25	20–25	25–22	22–25		88–97	P2 Report
26 May	14:00	Serbia	0–3	Germany	21–25	20–25	20–25			61–75	P2 Report
5 Jun	16:30	Serbia	3–0	Netherlands	25–17	25–20	26–24			76–61	P2 Report
7 Jun	20:00	United States	3–1	Serbia	23–25	25–15	25–23	25–14		98–77	P2 Report
8 Jun	20:00	Serbia	2–3	Argentina	26–28	18–25	25–18	25–22	13–15	107–108	P2 Report
9 Jun	18:00	Canada	1–3	Serbia	25–21	20–25	18–25	23–25		86–96	P2 Report
19 Jun	16:30	Cuba	2–3	Serbia	25–22	25–21	16–25	21–25	12–15	99–108	P2 Report
21 Jun	20:30	Turkey	1–3	Serbia	25–20	19–25	23–25	21–25		88–95	P2 Report
22 Jun	16:30	Serbia	2–3	Poland	21–25	25–21	18–25	25–22	11–15	100–108	P2 Report
23 Jun	20:30	Serbia	2–3	Slovenia	13–25	27–25	14–25	25–22	12–15	91–112	P2 Report
2024 Summer Olympics
28 Jul	17:00	France	3–2	Serbia	23–25	25–17	25–17	21–25	15–6	109–90	P2 Report
30 Jul	17:00	Slovenia	3–0	Serbia	25–21	25–19	25–19			75–59	P2 Report
3 Aug	21:00	Canada	2–3	Serbia	25–16	25–22	24–26	19–25	16–18	109–107	P2 Report

=== 2025 ===
2025 (W–L 5–14)
Date	Time	Opponent			Result						
2025 FIVB Men's Volleyball Nations League
11 Jun	20:30	Serbia	3–1	Turkey	12–25	25–22	25–23	25–23		87–93	P2 Report
12 Jun	17:00	China	3–0	Serbia	25–23	25–23	25–20			75–66	P2 Report
13 Jun	17:00	Japan	3–0	Serbia	25–20	25–23	26–24			76–67	P2 Report
15 Jun	19:00	Poland	3–0	Serbia	25–21	25–20	25–23			75–64	P2 Report
25 Jun	20:00	Serbia	1–3	Iran	21–25	19–25	25–23	23–25		88–98	P2 Report
26 Jun	20:00	Serbia	1–3	Cuba	25–22	22–25	16–25	16–25		79–97	P2 Report
28 Jun	20:00	Serbia	1–3	Argentina	25–18	18–25	23–25	12–25		78–93	P2 Report
29 Jun	20:00	Germany	3–1	Serbia	25–20	25–21	23–25	25–17		98–83	P2 Report
16 Jul	16:30	Serbia	0–3	Italy	15–25	14–25	16–25			45–75	P2 Report
18 Jul	16:30	Ukraine	0–3	Serbia	22–25	19–25	17–25			58–75	P2 Report
19 Jul	16:30	Serbia	3–1	Canada	15–25	25–22	25–18	25–22		90–87	P2 Report
20 Jul	20:30	Serbia	2–3	Slovenia	21–25	25–23	25–23	18–25	15–17	104–113	P2 Report
2025 Memorial of Hubert Jerzy Wagner
29 August	20:30	Poland	3–0	Serbia	25–20	25–13	25–22			75–55	Report
30 August	18:00	Serbia	0–3	Argentina	20–25	18–25	17–25			55–75	Report
31 August	18:00	Brazil	3–1	Serbia	25–18	22–25	25–19	27–25		99–87	Report
2025 FIVB Men's Volleyball World Championship
14 Sep	17:30	Serbia	0–3	Czech Republic	22–25	23–25	20–25			65–75	P2 Report
16 Sep	21:00	Serbia	3–0	China	25–18	25–19	29–27			79–64	P2 Report
18 Sep	10:00	Brazil	0–3	Serbia	22–25	20–25	22–25			64–75	P2 Report
23 Sep	20:00	Serbia	2–3	Iran	25–23	19–25	26–24	22–25	9–15	101–112	P2 Report

=== 2026 ===
2026 (W–L 8–10)
Date	Time	Opponent			Result						Attd.	Report
2026 FIVB Men's Volleyball Nations League
10 Jun	16:30	Serbia	3–1	Argentina	25–23	25–20	25–27	26–24		101–94	768	P2 Boxscore
12 Jun	16:30	Belgium	1–3	Serbia	18–25	26–24	21–25	22–25		87–99	658	P2 Boxscore
13 Jun	11:00	Brazil	3–0	Serbia	25–22	25–18	25–22			75–62	6,977	P2 Boxscore
14 Jun	14:30	Bulgaria	0–3	Serbia	28–30	22–25	23–25			73–80	1,859	P2 Boxscore
24 Jun	13:30	Serbia	1–3	Japan	17–25	15–25	25–22	16–25		73–97	2,600	P2 Boxscore
26 Jun	20:30	Serbia	3–1	Cuba	25–19	13–25	25–23	25–22		88–89	1,092	P2 Boxscore
27 Jun	20:30	France	3–0	Serbia	25–23	25–16	25–22			75–61	5,940	P2 Boxscore
28 Jun	20:30	Serbia	1–3	United States	12–25	23–25	26–24	17–25		78–99	1,275	P2 Boxscore
15 Jul	20:00	Serbia	0–3	Turkey	23–25	19–25	18–25			60–75	2,540	P2 Boxscore
16 Jul	20:00	Serbia	3–1	Ukraine	22–25	25–17	25–21	25–23		97–86	2,200	P2 Boxscore
18 Jul	20:00	Serbia	2–3	Germany	25–21	28–26	16–25	18–25	13–15	100–112	3,150	P2 Boxscore
19 Jul	20:00	Serbia	0–3	Slovenia	19–25	21–25	22–25			62–75	2,450	P2 Boxscore
2026 Men's European Volleyball Championship
11 Sep	20:00	Serbia	3–1	Estonia	25–23	26–24	26–28	25–22		102–97	2,203	Report
13 Sep	18:00	Finland	3–0	Serbia	25–19	25–21	25–23			75–63	10,929	Report
14 Sep	17:00	Serbia	3–2	Netherlands	20–25	23–25	30–28	25–15	17–15	115–108	876	Report
16 Sep	17:00	Denmark	2–3	Serbia	25–19	25–21	21–25	23–25	14–16	108–106	843	Report
17 Sep	17:00	Serbia	0–3	Belgium	19–25	21–25	16–25			56–75	3,018	Report
21 Sep	21:00	Slovenia	3–0	Serbia	25–14	25–13	25–22			75–49	1,153	Report

=== 2027 ===
2027 (W–L 0–0)
Date	Time	Opponent	Result	Attd.	Report
2027 Volleyball Nations League

== Team ==
=== Current squad ===
The following is Serbia's roster for the 2025 FIVB Men's Volleyball World Championship.

Head coach: (Romania) Gheorghe Crețu

- 1 Dušan Nikolić OP
- 3 Stefan Negić L
- 4 Veljko Mašulović OH
- 8 Marko Ivović OH
- 9 Nikola Jovović S
- 10 Miran Kujundžić OH
- 12 Pavle Perić OH
- 13 Vladimir Gajović MB
- 15 Nemanja Mašulović MB
- 16 Dražen Luburić OP
- 19 Aleksandar Stefanović MB
- 21 Vuk Todorović S
- 22 Nikola Brborić OH
- 29 Aleksandar Nedeljković MB

=== Coach history ===
- (Federal Republic of Yugoslavia) Zoran Gajić (1995–2002)
- (Federal Republic of Yugoslavia) Veselin Vuković (2002–2003)
- (Serbia and Montenegro) Ljubomir Travica (2003–2006)
- (Montenegro) Igor Kolaković (2006–2014)
- (Serbia) Nikola Grbić (2015–2019)
- (Serbia) Slobodan Kovač (2019–2021)
- (Montenegro) Igor Kolaković (2022–2024)
- (Romania) Gheorghe Crețu (2025–present)

=== Notable players ===
- Ivan Miljković
- Nikola Grbić
- Andrija Gerić

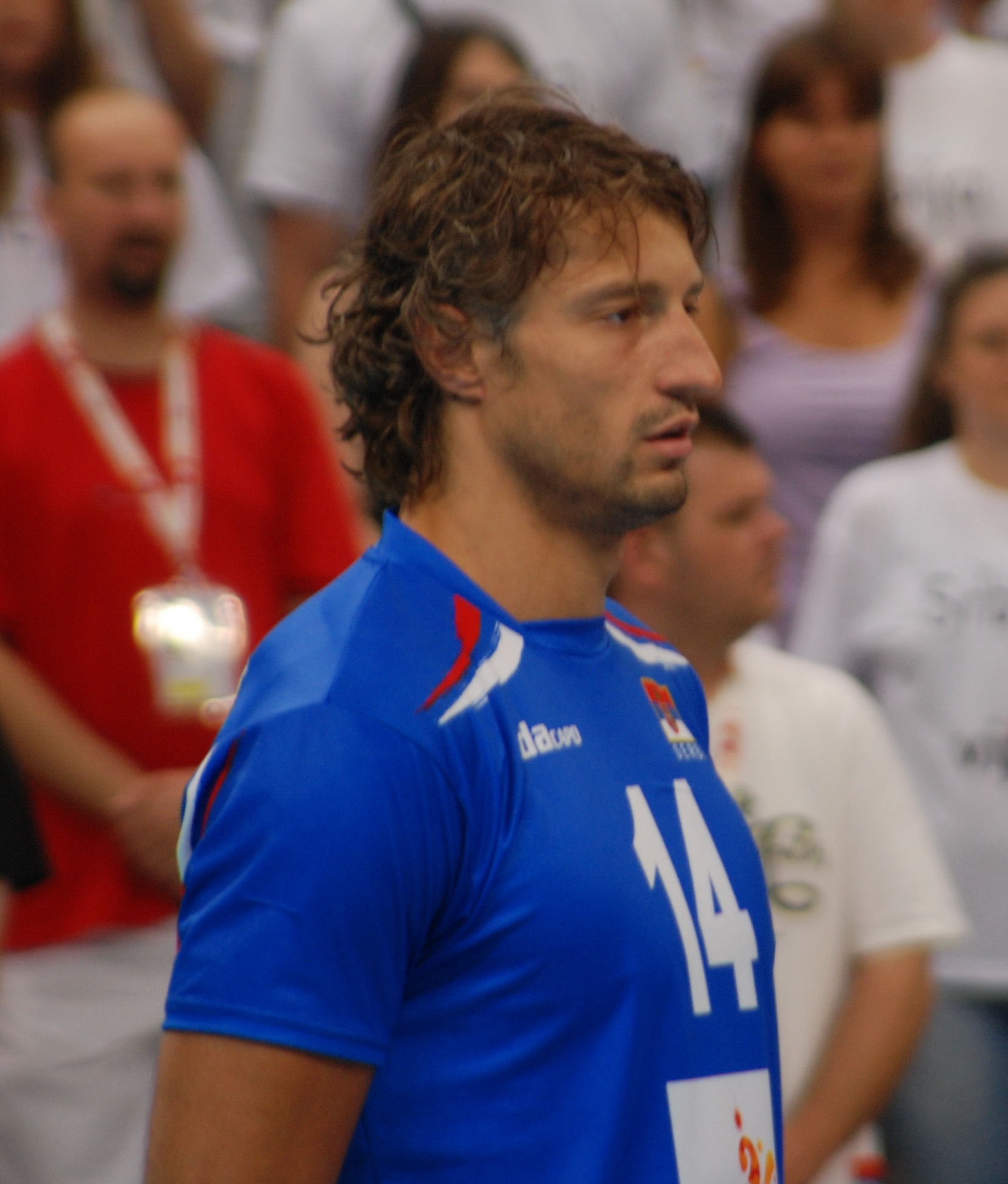
Ivan Miljković, one of the most notable players

- Slobodan Boškan
- Vladimir Grbić
- Slobodan Kovač
- Dejan Brđović
- Rajko Jokanović
- Goran Vujević
- Đula Mešter
- Vasa Mijić
- Žarko Petrović
- Igor Vušurović
- Bojan Janić
- Edin Škorić
- Veljko Petković
- Željko Tanasković

== Kit providers ==
The table below shows the history of kit providers for the Serbia national volleyball team.

Period	Kit provider
2000–	Asics DAcapo
2017–	Peak Sport Products

=== Sponsorship ===
Primary sponsors include: main sponsors like Poštanska štedionica. other sponsors: Škoda Auto, Radio Television of Serbia, Žurnal, Srbijagas, Posta, EPS and Blic.

== See also ==
- Serbia women's national volleyball team
- Yugoslavia men's national volleyball team
- Yugoslavia women's national volleyball team
