= Andrija Gerić =

Serbian volleyball player

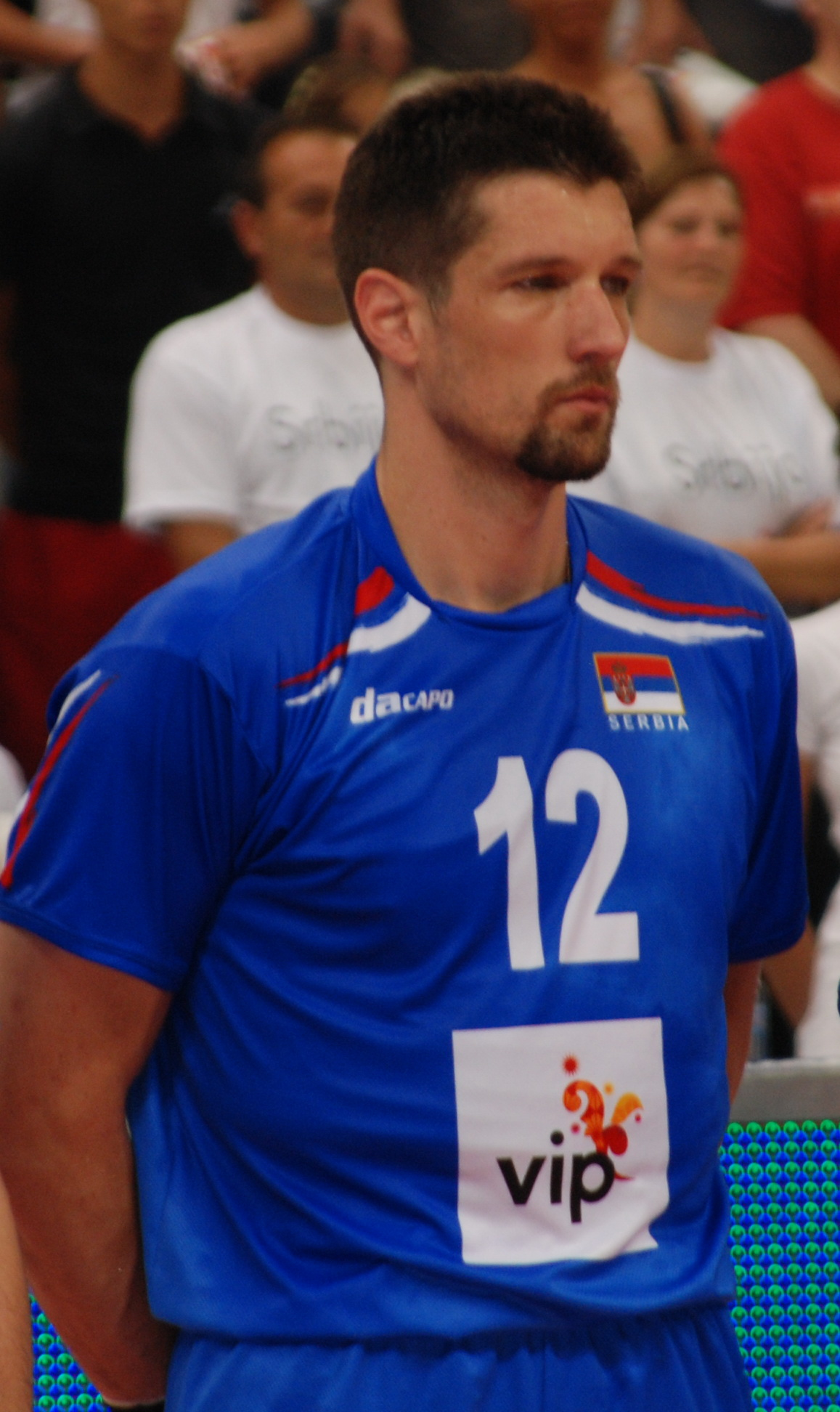

Personal information
- Born: 24 January 1977 (age 49); Novi Sad, SR Serbia, SFR Yugoslavia
- Height: 2.03 m (6 ft 8 in)
- Weight: 101 kg (223 lb)
- Spike: 350 cm (140 in)
- Block: 323 cm (127 in)

Volleyball information
- Position: Middle Blocker

National team
1995–2003; 2003–2006; 2006–2009	(Federal Republic of Yugoslavia) FR Yugoslavia (Federal Republic of Yugoslavia) Serbia and Montenegro; Serbia
Honours
Men's volleyball
Representing FR Yugoslavia
Olympic Games
Gold medal – first place	2000 Sydney	Team
Bronze medal – third place	1996 Atlanta	Team
World Championship
Silver medal – second place	1998 Japan	Team
World Grand Champions Cup
Bronze medal – third place	2001 Japan	Team
World League
Bronze medal – third place	2002 Belo Horizonte	Team
European Championship
Gold medal – first place	2001 Czech Republic	Team
Silver medal – second place	1997 Netherlands	Team
Bronze medal – third place	1995 Greece	Team
Bronze medal – third place	1999 Austria	Team
Representing Serbia and Montenegro
World Cup
Bronze medal – third place	2003 Japan	Team
World League
Silver medal – second place	2003 Madrid	Team
Silver medal – second place	2005 Belgrade	Team
Bronze medal – third place	2004 Rome	Team
European Championship
Bronze medal – third place	2005 Italy/Serbia and Montenegro	Team
Representing Serbia
World League
Silver medal – second place	2008 Rio de Janeiro	Team
Silver medal – second place	2009 Belgrade	Team
European Championship
Bronze medal – third place	2007 Russia	Team

Andrija Gerić (Serbian Cyrillic: Андрија Герић, pronounced [ǎndrija ɡěːritɕ]; born 24 January 1977) is a retired Serbian volleyball player who played on middle blocker position. Both in the club and in the national team he wore number 12.

== Career ==
Gerić made a debut for the national team on 7 July 1995 in Greece when FR Yugoslavia defeated Greece 0-3. In 2000 in Sydney the Yugoslav national team (members of which were also Vladimir Grbić, Nikola Grbić, Goran Vujević, Ivan Miljković) won the Olympic gold medal.

During his club's career he played for OK Vojvodina, Bossini Montichiari‚ Lube Banca Marche Macerata and Icom Latina from Italy, Panathinaikos VC from Greece and Fenerbahçe from Turkey. He won Champions League, CEV Cup, domestic Championships of Serbia, Italy and Turkey, as well as Serbian and Italian domestic Cup.

== Career ==
- 1993–99 (Federal Republic of Yugoslavia) OK Vojvodina Novi Sad
- 1999-01 (Italy) Bossini Montichiari
- 2001-02 (Italy) Lube Banca Marche Macerata
- 2002-03 (Italy) Icom Latina
- 2003-08 (Italy) Lube Banca Marche Macerata
- 2008-09 (Greece) Panathinaikos Athens
- 2009-10 (Italy) Top Volley Latina
- 2010-11 (Turkey) Fenerbahçe Istanbul
- 2011-12 (Serbia) OK Vojvodina Novi Sad

== Palmares ==
=== Club ===
- Champions League: 2002
- CEV Cup: 2005, 2006
- Serbian Championship: 1994, 1995, 1996, 1997, 1998, 1999
- Serbian Cup: 1994, 1995, 1996, 1998, 2012
- Italian Championship: 2006
- Italian Cup: 2008
- Turkish Championship: 2011

=== National team ===
- Olympic gold medal: 2000
- Olympic bronze medal: 1996
- World Championship's silver medal: 1998
- European Championship's gold medal: 2001
- European Championship's silver medal: 1997
- European Championship's bronze medal: 2005, 2007
- World League's silver medal: 2003, 2006, 2008

=== Individual awards ===
- Olympic Games 2000: best blocker
- World League 2003: best blocker
- World League 2003: best server
- World Cup 2003: best blocker
- Best Sportsman of Vojvodina: 2003
