= Ivan Miljković =

Serbian volleyball player

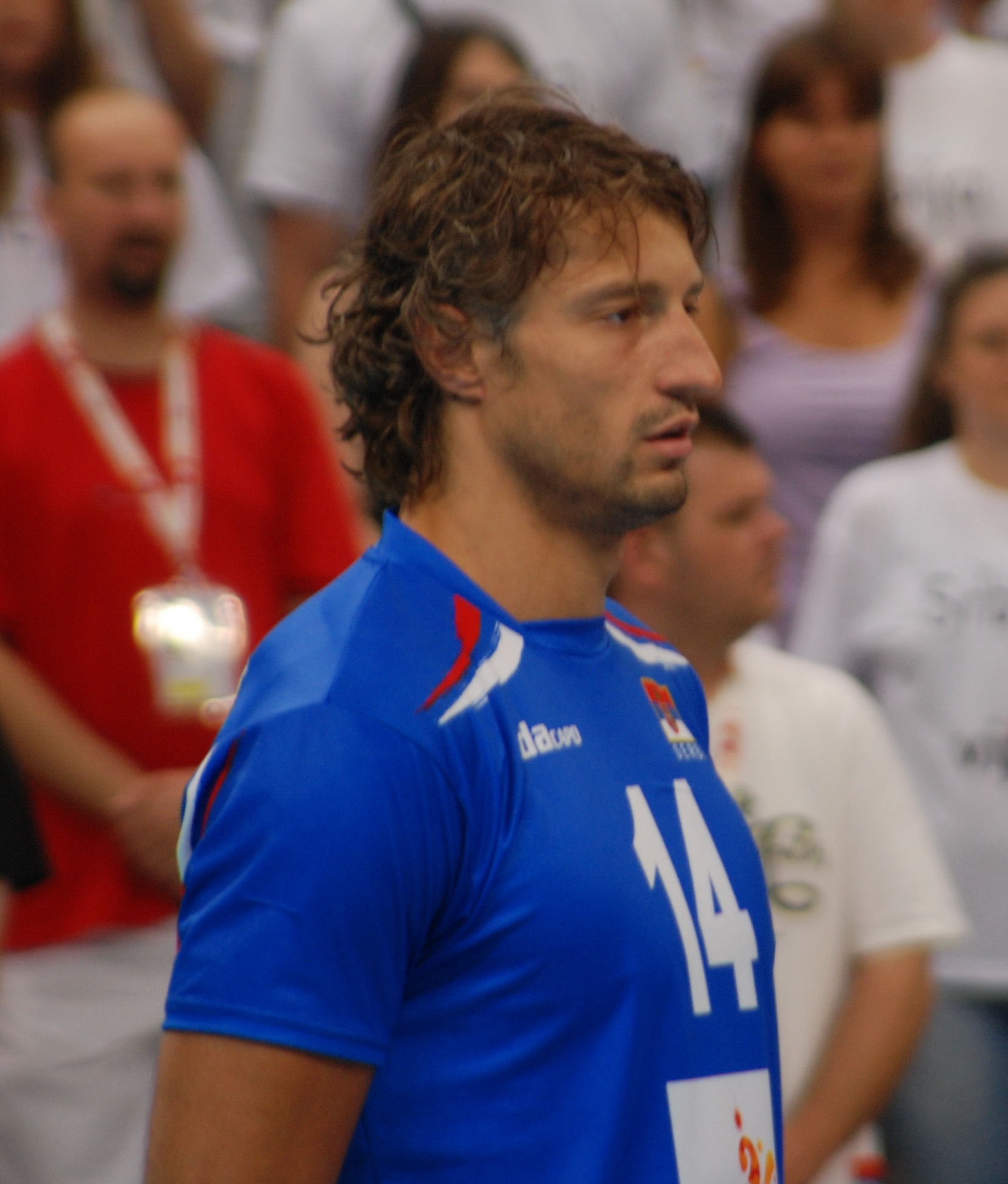
- Miljković in the national team

Personal information
- Full name: Ivan Miljković
- Nationality: Serbian/Italian
- Born: 13 September 1979 (age 47); Niš, Serbia, Yugoslavia
- Hometown: Nis (Serbia)
- Height: 2.06 m (6 ft 9 in)
- Weight: 100 kg (220 lb)
- Spike: 354 cm (139 in)
- Block: 333 cm (131 in)

Volleyball information
- Position: Opposite
- Current club: retired
- Number: 14

Career
Years	Teams
1996–2000; 2000–2007; 2007–2008; 2008–2010; 2009; 2010; 2010–2015; 2011; 2015–2016; 2016–2017	OK Partizan; Lube Banca Macerata; M. Roma Volley; Olympiacos Piraeus → Al Rayyan → Al Rayyan; Fenerbahçe Istanbul → Al Arabi; Cucine Lube Civitanova; Halkbank Ankara

National team
1998–2003; 2003–2006; 2006–2012	(Federal Republic of Yugoslavia) FR Yugoslavia (Federal Republic of Yugoslavia) Serbia and Montenegro; Serbia
Honours
Men's volleyball
Representing FR Yugoslavia
Olympic Games
Gold medal – first place	2000 Sydney	Team
World Championship
Silver medal – second place	1998 Japan	Team
World Grand Champions Cup
Bronze medal – third place	2001 Japan	Team
World League
Bronze medal – third place	2002 Belo Horizonte	Team
European Championship
Gold medal – first place	2001 Czech Republic	Team
Bronze medal – third place	1999 Austria	Team
Representing Serbia and Montenegro
World Cup
Bronze medal – third place	2003 Japan	Team
World League
Silver medal – second place	2003 Madrid	Team
Silver medal – second place	2005 Belgrade	Team
Bronze medal – third place	2004 Rome	Team
European Championship
Bronze medal – third place	2005 Italy/Serbia and Montenegro	Team
Representing Serbia
World Championship
Bronze medal – third place	2010 Italy	Team
World League
Silver medal – second place	2008 Rio de Janeiro	Team
Silver medal – second place	2009 Belgrade	Team
European Championship
Gold medal – first place	2011 Austria/Czech Republic	Team
Bronze medal – third place	2007 Russia	Team

Ivan Miljković (Serbian Cyrillic: Иван Миљковић [ǐʋan mǐːʎkoʋitɕ]; born 13 September 1979) is a Serbian businessman and former professional volleyball player. Miljković was a member of the Serbia men's national volleyball team from 1998–2012. He is an Olympic Champion (2000), a European Champion (2001, 2011), and a medalist of the FIVB Volleybal Men's World Championship, World Grand Champions Cup, World Cup and World League. Celebrated for his numerous individual and team accolades, Miljković is widely considered one of the greatest volleyball players of all time, particularly known for his powerful hitting and exceptional skills as an opposite hitter.

After retiring from his active playing career, Miljković remained engaged in sport in different positions (governance, marketing, campaigns, management). He also resumed his education in the areas of economy and finance. In 2025, he was inducted into the International Volleyball Hall of Fame.

== Career ==
=== Clubs ===
After this success he changed his club and started playing for Italian Lube Banca Macerata. In 2001 the Yugoslav team won the European Volleyball Championship in Ostrava, Czech Republic. With his club, Lube Banca Macerata, he also won the Champions League (2001), twice the Italian Cup (2001, 2003) and three times the CEV Cup (2001, 2005, 2006).

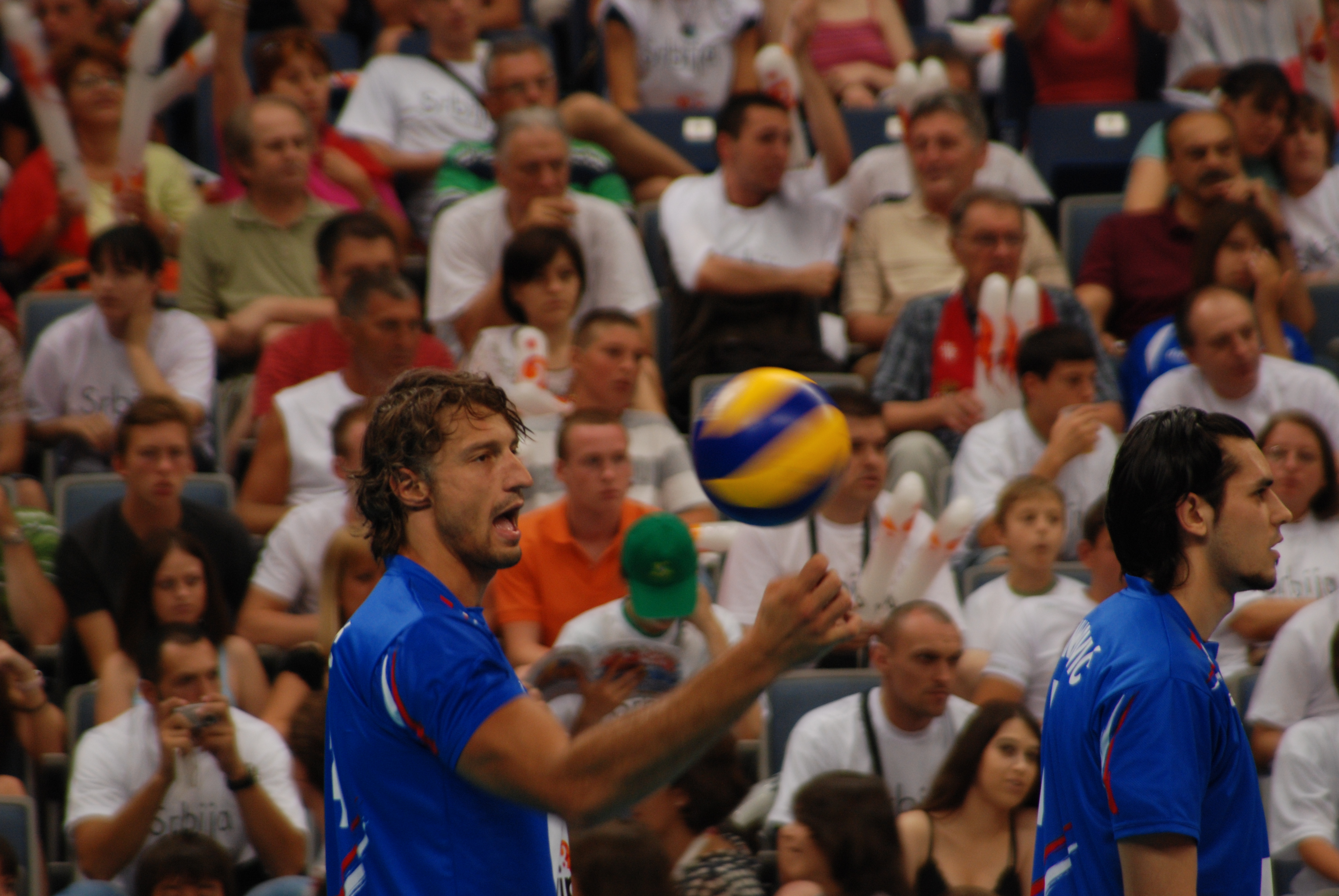
Miljkovic with Serbia national team

On 18 July 2007 he signed a contract with the M. Roma Volley. The following year, on 5 July 2008, Olympiacos, announced that he will be continuing his career in Greece. In 2009 he won the Greek Championship and the Greek Cup and in 2010 the championship. On 30 June 2010 he signed a two-year contract for Fenerbahçe SK of Turkey. With Fenerbahçe he won 2011 and 2012 Turkish volleyball league, 2012 Turkish Cup, 2011 and 2012 Turkish Super Cup and 2014 European Challenge Cup. Miljković played for Fenerbahçe Grundig in 2010–2015. Miljković in 2015 sing in Italian club Cucine Lube Civitanova. Miljković in 2016 back to Turkey League.

He ended up his career after achieving gold medal of Turkish Championship in May 2017 with Halkbank Ankara team.

=== National team ===
He played in the national team of FR Yugoslavia for the first time a year later (on 4 October 1998, in a game against Turkey). In 2000 in Sydney the Yugoslav national team (members of which were also Vladimir Grbić, Nikola Grbić, Andrija Gerić, Goran Vujević) won the Olympic gold medal. In the final match against Russia Ivan Miljković scored the last point and after that fell on his knees. In March 2012, has officially retired from the Serbian National Team after 14 years and 288 played matches. The only player to win MVP of the FIVB World League 3 times in a row (2002, 2003, 2004) and only player to win 4 MVP awards during the FIVB World League (2002, 2003, 2004, 2006).

== Sports business professional career ==
- Chief Athletes Commission – Olympic Committee of Serbia
- Executive Board Member – Olympic Committee of Serbia
- 1st Vice President – Volleyball Federation of Serbia

== Executive education ==
- Université de Limoges Master's degree, Sport Governance, 2020 - 2022
- Harvard Business School Online, Alternative Investments, Jan 2022 - Feb 2022, Private Equity, Private Debt, Distressed Investing and Secondaries, Hedge Funds, Real Estate, Portfolio Construction
- Faculty of Economics, Finance and Administration - FEFA, Business Administration, Management and Operations

== Style of play ==
Miljković frequently ranks among the top spikers in tournament statistics and employs a jump serve as a primary serve type. As an opposite hitter, he utilizes a range of attacking shots, combining power with technical variation. Despite his height, his footwork and lateral quickness allow him to adjust his approach speed effectively across varying distances to the ball.

== Sporting achievements ==
=== Clubs ===
==== CEV Champions League ====
- 2001/2002 – with Lube Macerata
- 2015/2016 – with Cucine Lube Civitanova

==== CEV Challenge Cup ====
- 2000/2001, 2004/2005, 2005/2006 – with Lube Macerata
- 2013/2014 – with Fenerbahçe

==== CEV Cup ====
- 2007–2008 – with M. Roma

==== National League ====
- Champions Italia – 2005–2006
- Champions Greece – 2008–2009, 2009–2010
- Champions Turkey – 2010–2011, 2011–2012, 2016–2017
- Champions Qatar – 2009, 2010, 2012

=== Individually ===
- 2001 World League "Most Valuable Player"
- 2001 World League "Best Scorer"
- 2001 European Championship "Most Valuable Player"
- 2001 European Championship "Best Scorer"
- 2001 World Grand Champions Cup "Most Valuable Player"
- 2001 World Grand Champions Cup "Best Scorer"
- 2002 Serie A1 League "Most Valuable Player"
- 2002 World League "Most Valuable Player"
- 2002 World League "Best Scorer"
- 2003 World League "Most Valuable Player"
- 2003 World League "Best Scorer"
- 2005 World League "Most Valuable Player"
- 2005 World League "Best Scorer"
- 2005 World League "Best Server"
- 2005 European Championship "Best Server"
- 2005–06 Top Teams Cup "Most Valuable Player"
- 2005–06 Top Teams Cup "Best Scorer"
- 2005–06 Top Teams Cup "Best Blocker"
- 2006 Serie A1 League "Most Valuable Player"
- 2007 European Championship "Best Scorer"
- 2007–08 CEV Cup "Best Spiker"
- 2008 World League "Best Scorer"
- 2009 World League "Best Scorer"
- 2010 Greek Volley League "Most Valyable Player
- 2009–10 CEV Champions League "Best Scorer"
- 2011 European Championship "Most Valuable Player"
- 2011 Sportsperson of the Year of Niš
- Best Volleyball Player in the History by volleyball-movies.net
- Serbia's sport Association "May Award"
- 2013–2014 Challenge Cup "Most Valuable Player"

=== Record ===
- 37 Points – 2002 FIVB World League record
- 37 Points – 2005 FIVB World League record

Sporting positions
Preceded by Nikola Grbić	Serbia captain 2011	Succeeded by Bojan Janić
Awards
Preceded by (Italy) Andrea Giani (Poland) Piotr Gruszka	Most Valuable Player of European Championship; 2001; 2011	Succeeded by (Italy) Andrea Sartoretti (Russia) Dmitriy Muserskiy
