= Đula Mešter =

Serbian volleyball player (born 1972)

Medal record

Men's volleyball

Representing Yugoslavia

Olympic Games
Gold medal – first place	2000 Sydney	Team
Bronze medal – third place	1996 Atlanta	Team

World Championship
Silver medal – second place	1998 Japan	Team

European Championship
Gold medal – first place	2001 Ostrava	Team
Silver medal – second place	1997 Eindhoven	Team
Bronze medal – third place	1995 Piraeus	Team
Bronze medal – third place	1999 Vienna	Team

World Grand Champions Cup
Bronze medal – third place	2001 Japan	Team

World League
Bronze medal – third place	2002 Belo Horizonte	Team

Representing Serbia and Montenegro

World League
Silver medal – second place	2003 Madrid	Team
Bronze medal – third place	2004 Rome	Team

Đula Mešter (Serbian Cyrillic: Ђула Мештер; Hungarian: Mester Gyula, born 3 April 1972) is a retired Serbian professional volleyball player who won the gold medal with the Yugoslav Men's National Team at the 2000 Summer Olympics. Standing at 2.03 m, he played as a middle blocker. He was a member of the national team representing Serbia and Montenegro at the 2004 Summer Olympics in Athens, Greece.

After retirement as a player Mešter became president of SD Spartak from Subotica. He became vice president of Volleyball Federation of Serbia in 2016 and was first vice president from March 2019 to November 2022. He became president of Federation in 2023 succeeding Zoran Gajić.

== Sources ==
- Serbian Olympic Committee
- Đula Mešter at Olympedia
