= Slobodan Boškan =

Serbian volleyball player (born 1975)

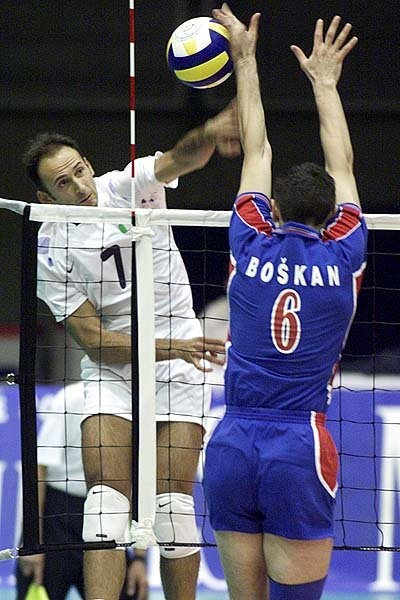

Personal information
- Born: 18 August 1975 (age 51); Novi Sad, SR Serbia, SFR Yugoslavia
- Height: 1.97 m (6 ft 6 in)
- Weight: 87 kg (192 lb)
- Spike: 343 cm (135 in)
- Block: 320 cm (130 in)

Volleyball information
- Position: Outside hitter

Career
Years	Teams
1994–1999; 1999–2000; 2000–2002; 2002–2003; 2003–2004; 2004–2008; 2008; 2008–2011	OK Vojvodina; Olympiacos S.C. Trentino Volley; Iraklis Thessaloniki V.C. OK Vojvodina; Tours VB; Halkbank Ankara; Budvanska Rivijera Budva

National team
1995–2003; 2003–2006; 2006–2007	(Federal Republic of Yugoslavia) FR Yugoslavia (Federal Republic of Yugoslavia) Serbia and Montenegro; Serbia
Honours
Men's volleyball
Representing FR Yugoslavia
Olympic Games
Gold medal – first place	2000 Sydney	Team
World Championship
Silver medal – second place	1998 Japan	Team
World Grand Champions Cup
Bronze medal – third place	2001 Japan	Team
World League
Bronze medal – third place	2002 Belo Horizonte	Team
European Championship
Gold medal – first place	2001 Czech Republic	Team
Silver medal – second place	1997 Netherlands	Team
Bronze medal – third place	1995 Greece	Team
Bronze medal – third place	1999 Austria	Team
Representing Serbia and Montenegro
World Cup
Bronze medal – third place	2003 Japan	Team
World League
Silver medal – second place	2003 Madrid	Team
European Championship
Bronze medal – third place	2005 Italy/Serbia and Montenegro	Team
Representing Serbia
European Championship
Bronze medal – third place	2007 Russia	Team
- Last updated: 13 February 2017

Slobodan Boškan (Serbian Cyrillic: Слободан Бошкан, born 18 August 1975) is a Serbian former volleyball player, a member of Serbia men's national volleyball team, 2000 Olympic volleyball champion, medalist of European Championship and World League.

== Career ==
In 2000, he was part of the Yugoslav team which won the gold medal in the Olympic tournament. He played one match.

== Personal life ==
Boškan's son, Vuk Boškan, is a professional footballer who plays for Vojvodina.
