= Rajko Jokanović =

Serbian volleyball player (born 1971)

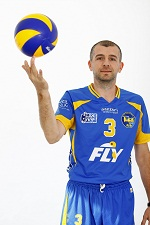
- Rajko Jokanovic

Personal information
- Full name: Rajko Jokanović
- Born: 27 November 1971 (age 54); Belgrade, Serbia
- Height: 191 cm (6 ft 3 in)
Honours
Men's volleyball
Representing Yugoslavia / FR Yugoslavia / Serbia and Montenegro / Serbia
Olympic Games
Bronze medal – third place	1996 Atlanta	Team
European Championship
Bronze medal – third place	1995 Greece
Gold medal – first place	2001 Czech Republic
World Grand Champions Cup
Bronze medal – third place	2001 Japan
World League
Bronze medal – third place	2002 Belo Horizonte
Silver medal – second place	2003 Madrid

Rajko Jokanović (Serbian Cyrillic: Рајко Јокановић; born 27 November 1971) is a Serbian volleyball player who competed for Yugoslavia in the 1996 Summer Olympics.

He was born in Belgrade, Yugoslavia (now in Serbia), and played for OK Crvena Zvezda.

In 1996, he was part of the Yugoslav team which won the bronze medal in the Olympic tournament. He played three matches.
