= Edin Škorić =

Serbian volleyball player

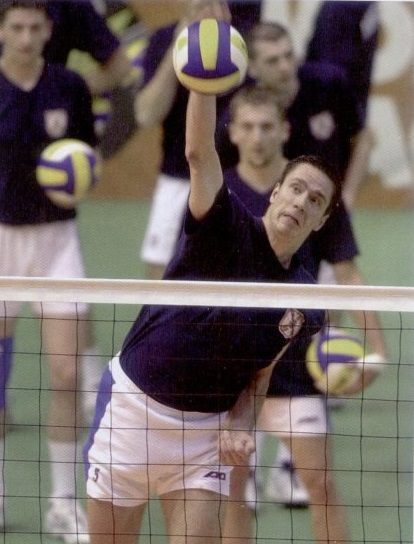

Personal information
- Full name: Edin Škorić
- Born: 1 December 1975 (age 50); Bihać, SR Bosnia-Herzegovina, SFR Yugoslavia
- Height: 1.97 m (6 ft 6 in)
- Spike: 350 cm (140 in)
- Block: 335 cm (132 in)

Volleyball information
- Position: Outside hitter

Career
Years	Teams
1992-97; 1997-99; 1999-02; 2002-03; 2003-04; 2004 2004-06; 2006-07; 2007 (half season); 2007-08; 2008-09; 2009-10	(Federal Republic of Yugoslavia) OK Crvena Zvezda (Federal Republic of Yugoslavia) OK Vojvodina (Greece) Panellinios G.S. (Italy) Volley Lube (Greece) Orestiada (France) Saint-Brieuc Côtes-d'Armor Volley-Ball (Greece) Panellinios G.S. (Greece) AEK Athens V.C. (Iran) Pegah Urmia (Austria) Hypo Tirol Innsbruck (Cyprus) Pafiakos, Paohos (Romania) Dinamo Romprest București

National team
(Federal Republic of Yugoslavia) FR Yugoslavia
Honours
Men's volleyball
Representing FR Yugoslavia
European Championship
Gold medal – first place	2001 Ostrava
World Grand Champions Cup
Bronze medal – third place	2001 Japan

Edin Škorić (Serbian: Един Шкорић; born 1 December 1975) is a former Serbian volleyball player. As a member of FR Yugoslavia national team, he won gold medal at the 2001 European Championship in Ostrava. He lived in Bihać only 2 years and in Zagreb, Croatia 14 years, before he came in Belgrade, Serbia where he lives now.
