= Milan Rašić =

Serbian volleyball player

Personal information
- Full name: Milan Rašić
- Born: 2 February 1985 (age 41); Niš, SR Serbia, SFR Yugoslavia
- Height: 2.05 m (6 ft 9 in)
- Weight: 86 kg (190 lb)
- Spike: 340 cm (134 in)
- Block: 320 cm (126 in)

Volleyball information
- Position: Middle Blocker
- Current club: OK Orač Niš

Career
Years	Teams
2008-2010	OK Crvena Zvezda
2010-2013	ACH Volley
2013-2015	RC Cannes
2015-2016	Samen Alhojaj
2016-2017	Shahrdari Tabriz VC

National team
Serbia
Honours
Men's volleyball
Representing Serbia
World Championship
Bronze medal – third place	2010 Italy
European Championship
Gold medal – first place	2011 Austria / Czech Republic
Bronze medal – third place	2013 Denmark / Poland

Milan Rašić (Serbian: Милан Рашић; born 2 February 1985 in Niš, SR Serbia, Yugoslavia) is a Serbian volleyball player. He was a member of the national team at the 2012 Summer Olympics in London.
