= Vlado Petković =

Serbian volleyball player (born 1983)

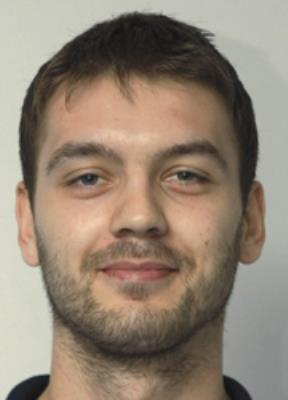
- Petković in 2011

Personal information
- Full name: Vlado Petković
- Nationality: Serbia
- Born: January 6, 1983 (age 43) Kraljevo, SR Serbia, SFR Yugoslavia
- Home town: Kraljevo
- Height: 1.98 m (6 ft 6 in)
- Weight: 97 kg (214 lb)
- Spike: 325 cm (128 in)
- Block: 318 cm (125 in)

Volleyball information
- Position: Setter
- Current club: Crvena zvezda
- Number: 11

National team
- Years: Team
- –: Serbia and Montenegro; Serbia
Honours
World Championship
Bronze medal – third place	2010 Italy
European Championship
Gold medal – first place	2011 Austria / Czech Rep.
Bronze medal – third place	2005 Italy / Serbia and Montenegro
Bronze medal – third place	2007 Russia
Bronze medal – third place	2013 Denmark / Poland
World League
Silver medal – second place	2008 Rio de Janeiro
Silver medal – second place	2009 Belgrade
Bronze medal – third place	2010 Cordoba
Mediterranean Games
Bronze medal – third place	2005 Almería
- Updated on September 2011

Vlado Petković (Serbian Cyrillic: Владо Петковић, born January 6, 1983, in Kraljevo) is a Serbian volleyball player. He plays as setter. He is currently playing for Crvena zvezda. He played for the national team at the 2008 Summer Olympics in Beijing and 2012 Summer Olympics in London.

== Career ==
- 2002–05 (Federal Republic of Yugoslavia) OK Crvena zvezda (Volleyball League of Serbia)
- 2005–09 (Serbia) OK Vojvodina
- 2009–10 Woori Capital Dream Six (South Korea Volleyball V-League)
- 2010–11 ACH Volley Bled (Slovenia Volleyball League)
- 2011–12 (Italy) Energy Resources San Giustino (Italian Volleyball League)
- 2012–13 (Iran) Kalleh Mazandaran (Iranian Volleyball Super League)
- 2013–14 (Iran) Shahrdari Urmia
- 2015 (Iran) Mizan Khorasan
- 2015-2016 (Turkey) Şahinbey Belediyespor (Turkish Men's Volleyball League)
- 2016-2017 (Greece) PAOK VC
- 2017-2018 (Lebanon) Speedball Cheikh
- 2018– OK Crvena zvezda (Volleyball League of Serbia)
