= Vasa Mijić =

Serbian volleyball player (born 1973)

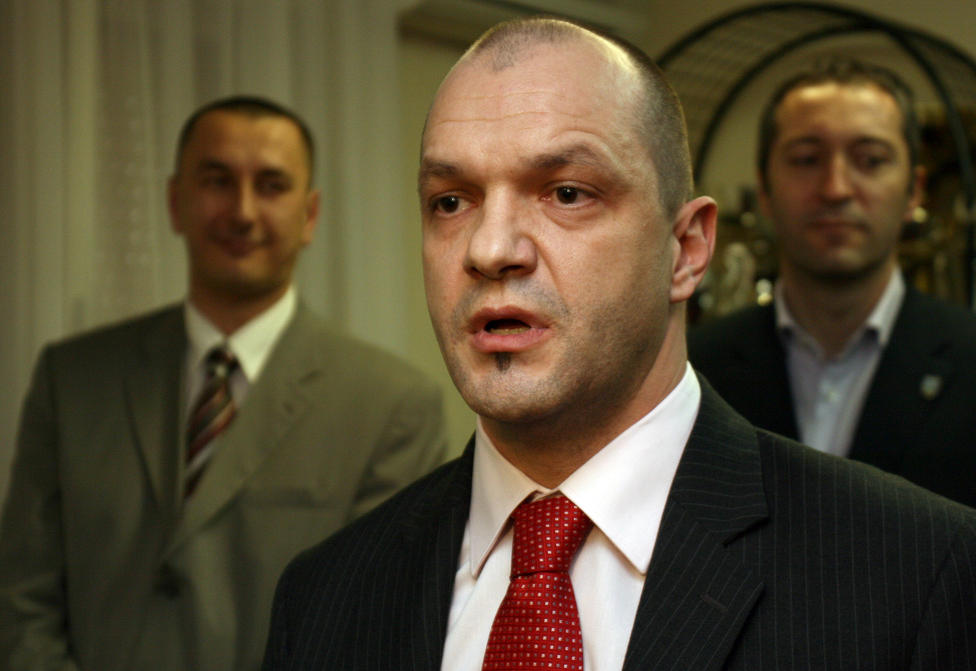

Personal information
- Born: 11 April 1973 (age 53); Novi Sad, Serbia, Yugoslavia
- Height: 186 cm (6 ft 1 in)

Volleyball information
- Position: Libero
- Number: 8
Medal record
Men's volleyball
Representing FR Yugoslavia
Olympic Games
Gold medal – first place	2000 Sydney	Team Competition
European Championship
Gold medal – first place	2001 Ostrava	Team competition
World Grand Champions Cup
Bronze medal – third place	2001 Japan	Team competition
World League
Bronze medal – third place	2002 Belo Horizonte	Team competition
Representing Serbia and Montenegro
World Cup
Bronze medal – third place	2003 Japan	Team competition
World League
Silver medal – second place	2003 Madrid	Team competition
Bronze medal – third place	2004 Rome	Team competition

Vasa Mijić (born 11 April 1973) is a Serbian volleyball player who won the gold medal with the Yugoslavian Men's National Team at the 2000 Summer Olympics. Standing at 1.86 m, he played as a libero.

== Career ==
Mijić was named Best Digger at the 2001 European Championship in Ostrava, where the national squad claimed the gold medal. He was a member of the national team representing Serbia and Montenegro at the 2004 Summer Olympics.

== Individual awards ==
- 2001 European Championship "Best Digger"
