= Goran Marić (volleyball) =

Serbian volleyball player

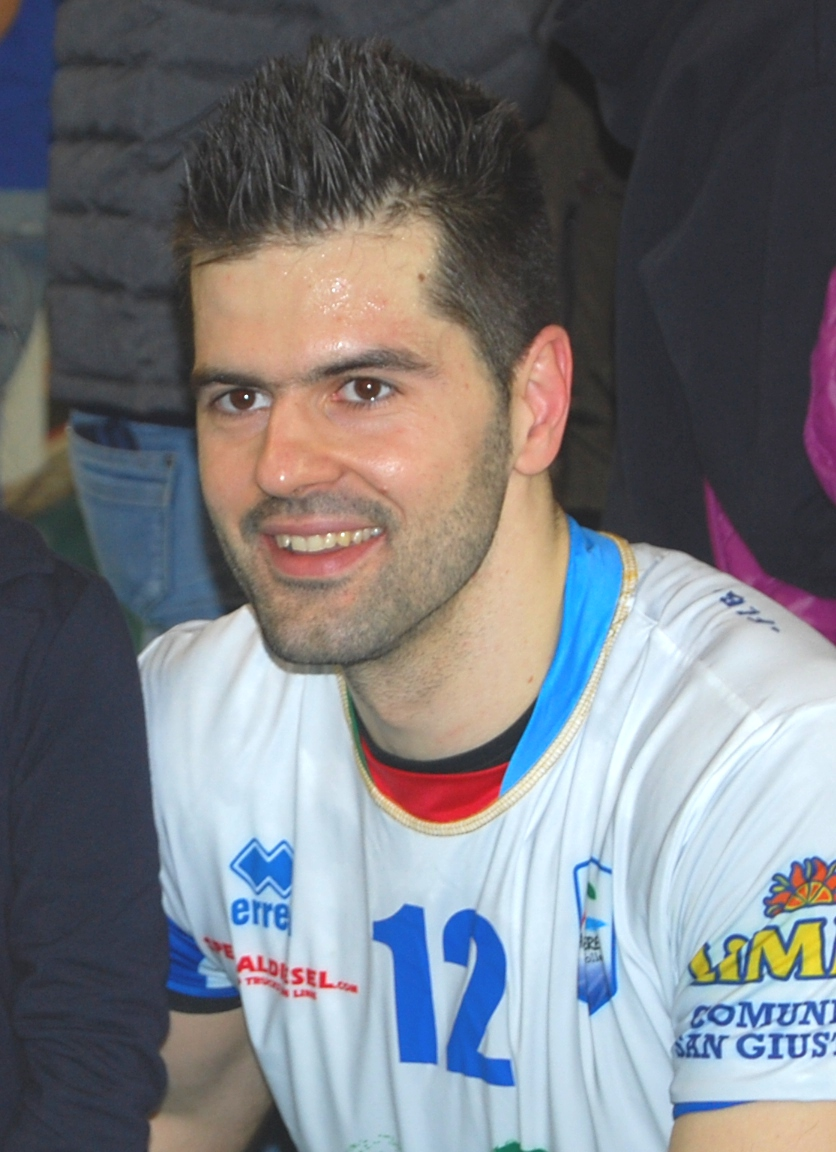

Personal information
- Full name: Goran Marić
- Born: 2 November 1981 (age 44); Novi Sad, SR Serbia, Yugoslavia
- Height: 2.04 m (6 ft 8 in)
- Spike: 327 cm (129 in)
- Block: 344 cm (135 in)

Volleyball information
- Position: Opposite

Career
Years	Teams
1999-2004; 2004-2005; 2005-2006; 2006-2008; 2008-2009; 2009-2010; 2010-2011; 2010-2011; 2010-2011	OK Vojvodina; Dorica Ancona; Volley Arezzo; Volley Corigliano; Blu Volley Verona; Volley Forlì; Umbria Volley; NMV Castellana; AV San Giustino

National team
(Federal Republic of Yugoslavia) FR Yugoslavia
Honours
Men's volleyball
Representing FR Yugoslavia
European Championship
Gold medal – first place	2001 Czech Republic
World Cup
Bronze medal – third place	2003 Japan
World League
Silver medal – second place	2009 Belgrade
Bronze medal – third place	2002 Belo Horizonte

Goran Marić (Serbian Cyrillic: Горан Марић; born 2 November 1981 in Novi Sad, SR Serbia, Yugoslavia) is a Serbian volleyball player. As a member of national team, he became European Champion in 2001. He plays for Paris Volley.
