= 2001 Men's European Volleyball Championship =

Tournament details
- Host country: Czech Republic
- Dates: September 8–16
- Teams: 12
- Venue: 1 (in 1 host city)

Final positions
- Champions: FR Yugoslavia (1st title)

Tournament awards
- MVP: (Serbia and Montenegro) Ivan Miljkovic

The 2001 Men's European Volleyball Championship was the 22nd edition of the event, organized by Europe's governing volleyball body, the Confédération Européenne de Volleyball. It was hosted in Ostrava, Czech Republic from September 8 to September 16, 2001.

== Qualification ==
The number one to six from the 1999 edition of the Men's European Volleyball Championship — Italy, Yugoslavia, Russia, France, Czech Republic (also host) and the Netherlands — were automatically qualified for the 2001 edition. The other teams had to qualify in the previous year.

== Teams ==
Group A

- Bulgaria
- Czech Republic
- Netherlands
- Russia
- Slovakia
- Slovenia

Group B

- France
- Germany
- Hungary
- Italy
- Poland
- FR Yugoslavia

== Preliminary round ==
=== Group A ===
	Team	Points	G	W	L	PW	PL	Ratio	SW	SL	Ratio
1.	Czech Republic	9	5	4	1	418	367	1.139	13	5	2.600
2.	Russia	9	5	4	1	427	362	1.180	12	6	2.000
3.	Netherlands	8	5	3	2	443	407	1.089	12	7	1.714
4.	Bulgaria	8	5	3	2	431	435	0.991	11	9	1.222
5.	Slovakia	6	5	1	4	393	452	0.869	5	14	0.357
6.	Slovenia	5	5	0	5	339	428	0.792	3	15	0.200

- September 8

Slovakia	0–3	Netherlands	20–25, 21–25, 29–31
Slovenia	1–3	Czech Republic	15–25, 25–21, 17–25, 12–25
Russia	3–1	Bulgaria	25–13, 25–13, 20–25, 25–18

- September 9

Netherlands	3–1	Czech Republic	25–15, 25–17, 19–25, 25–20
Slovakia	1–3	Russia	25–20, 19–25, 20–25, 17–25
Bulgaria	3–0	Slovenia	25–21, 25–15, 25–20

- September 10

Russia	3–1	Netherlands	24–26, 25–22, 25–20, 25–17
Czech Republic	3–1	Bulgaria	25–22, 25–20, 20–25, 25–20
Slovenia	2–3	Slovakia	25–20, 21–25, 22–25, 25–22, 13–15

- September 12

Netherlands	2–3	Bulgaria	22–25, 25–23, 25–17, 23–25, 13–15
Slovakia	0–3	Czech Republic	19–25, 23–25, 12–25
Russia	3–0	Slovenia	25–17, 25–14, 25–21

- September 13

Bulgaria	3–1	Slovakia	20–25, 25–15, 25–21, 25–20
Czech Republic	3–0	Russia	25–19, 25–21, 25–23
Slovenia	0–3	Netherlands	20–25, 16–25, 20–25

=== Group B ===
	Team	Points	G	W	L	PW	PL	Ratio	SW	SL	Ratio
1.	FR Yugoslavia	9	5	4	1	473	412	1.148	14	6	2.333
2.	Italy	8	5	3	2	436	383	1.138	11	7	1.571
3.	France	8	5	3	2	492	481	1.023	13	9	1.444
4.	Poland	8	5	3	2	437	434	1.007	9	10	0.900
5.	Hungary	6	5	1	4	361	418	0.864	5	12	0.417
6.	Germany	6	5	1	4	407	478	0.851	6	14	0.429

- September 8

France	2–3	FR Yugoslavia	18–25, 21–25, 27–25, 25–23, 13–15
Hungary	0–3	Italy	23–25, 14–25, 13–25
Germany	1–3	Poland	25–21, 29–31, 15–25, 14–25

- September 9

France	3–0	Hungary	27–25, 25–18, 25–21
Italy	3–1	Germany	25–14, 25–16, 23–25, 25–16
FR Yugoslavia	3–0	Poland	25–19, 25–14, 25–22

- September 10

Germany	1–3	France	20–25, 25–20, 16–25, 24–26
Hungary	1–3	FR Yugoslavia	29–27, 18–25, 17–25, 19–25
Poland	0–3	Italy	21–25, 32–34, 21–25

- September 12

Hungary	3–0	Germany	26–24, 25–21, 25–22
FR Yugoslavia	3–0	Italy	25–21, 25–23, 27–25
France	2–3	Poland	25–23, 17–25, 25–19, 25–27, 12–15

- September 13

Germany	3–2	FR Yugoslavia	19–25, 25–21, 17–25, 25–23, 15–12
Poland	3–1	Hungary	25–15, 20–25, 27–25, 25–23
Italy	2–3	France	21–25, 25–21, 22–25, 25–21, 17–19

== Final round ==
Semi-finals
September 15, 2001 – Ostrava
Italy	3
Czech Republic	0
September 15, 2001 – Ostrava
Russia	0
FR Yugoslavia	3

Final
September 16, 2001 – Ostrava
FR Yugoslavia	3
Italy	0
Third place
September 16, 2001 – Ostrava
Russia	3
Czech Republic	2

- September 15

Czech Republic	0–3	Italy	22–25, 27–29, 9–25
Russia	0–3	FR Yugoslavia	20–25, 17–25, 27–29

- September 16

Czech Republic	2–3	Russia	25–18, 15–25, 25–21, 22–25, 12–15
Italy	0–3	FR Yugoslavia	21–25, 18–25, 20–25

5-8th place
September 15, 2001 – Ostrava
Netherlands	1
Poland	3
September 15, 2001 – Ostrava
Bulgaria	3
France	1

5th place
September 16, 2001 – Ostrava
Poland	3
Bulgaria	2
7th place
September 16, 2001 – Ostrava
Netherlands	1
France	3

- September 15

Netherlands	1–3	Poland	21–25, 25–21, 21–25, 25–27
Bulgaria	3–1	France	24–26, 26–24, 30–28, 25–16

- September 16

Netherlands	1–3	France	18–25, 25–18, 22–25, 24–26
Poland	3–2	Bulgaria	25–27, 27–25, 25–21, 22–25, 15–11

== Final ranking ==
Place	Team
1.	FR Yugoslavia
2.	Italy
3.	Russia
4.	Czech Republic
5.	Poland
6.	Bulgaria
7.	France
8.	Netherlands
9.	Germany
10.	Hungary
11.	Slovakia
12.	Slovenia

2001 Men's European champions

FR Yugoslavia
First title

Team Roster
Rajko Jokanović, Goran Marić, Edin Škorić, Slobodan Boškan, Đula Mešter, Vasa Mijić, Nikola Grbić, Vladimir Grbić, Andrija Gerić, Goran Vujević, Ivan Miljković, and Igor Vušurović.
Head coach: Zoran Gajić.

== Individual awards ==
- Most valuable player
  - Ivan Miljković (YUG)
- Best scorer
  - Ivan Miljković (YUG)
- Best attacker
  - Martin Lebl (CZE)
- Best blocker
  - Dominique Daquin (FRA)
- Best digger
  - Vasa Mijić (YUG)
- Best setter
  - Nikola Grbić (YUG)
- Best libero
  - Mirko Corsano (ITA)
- Best receiver
  - Hubert Henno (FRA)
