= 2011 Men's European Volleyball Championship =

2011 Men's European Championship

Tournament details
- Host country: Austria; Czech Republic
- Dates: 10–18 September
- Teams: 16
- Venues: 4 (in 4 host cities)

Final positions
- Champions: Serbia (2nd title)

Tournament awards
- MVP: (Serbia) Ivan Miljković

Tournament statistics
- Matches played: 36
- Attendance: 138,600 (3,850 per match)

The 2011 Men's European Volleyball Championship was the 27th edition of the European Volleyball Championship, organised by Europe's governing volleyball body, the CEV. It was held in Austria and Czech Republic from 10 to 18 September 2011.

== Host selection ==
Candidates for the 2011 Men's European Volleyball Championship

- Austria / Czech Republic (Winner)
- Bulgaria / Greece
- Denmark
- France
- Netherlands

== Qualification ==
- Hosts
  - Austria
  - Czech Republic
- Top 5 teams of the 2009 edition directly qualified.
  - Poland
  - France
  - Bulgaria
  - Russia
  - Serbia
- Qualified through the qualification.
  - Slovenia
  - Finland
  - Portugal
  - Germany
  - Slovakia
  - Italy
  - Belgium
  - Estonia
  - Turkey

== Pools composition ==
Pool A	Pool B	Pool C	Pool D
Austria (Hosts)	Czech Republic (Hosts)	Italy	Poland
Serbia	Russia	France	Bulgaria
Slovenia	Portugal	Finland	Slovakia
Turkey	Estonia	Belgium	Germany

== Venues ==
Pool A and Final round	Pool B, Playoffs and Quarterfinals	Pool C	Pool D
Vienna, Austria	Karlovy Vary, Czech Republic	Innsbruck, Austria	Prague, Czech Republic
Wiener Stadthalle Hall D	KV Arena Multi-purpose Hall	Olympiahalle Innsbruck	O2 Arena
Capacity: 16,152	Capacity: 6,000	Capacity: 10,000	Capacity: 16,805

== Pool standing procedure ==
1. Match points
2. Number of matches won
3. Sets ratio
4. Points ratio
5. Result of the last match between the tied teams

Match won 3–0 or 3–1: 3 match points for the winner, 0 match points for the loser
Match won 3–2: 2 match points for the winner, 1 match point for the loser

== Preliminary round ==
- All times are Central European Summer Time (UTC+02:00).

=== Pool A ===
Pos	Team	Pld	W	L	Pts	SW	SL	SR	SPW	SPL	SPR	Qualification
1	Serbia	3	3	0	9	9	1	9.000	248	185	1.341	Quarterfinals
2	Slovenia	3	2	1	5	7	5	1.400	255	262	0.973	Playoffs
3	Turkey	3	1	2	4	5	6	0.833	232	238	0.975	Playoffs
4	Austria	3	0	3	0	0	9	0.000	175	225	0.778	

Date	Time		Score		Set 1	Set 2	Set 3	Set 4	Set 5	Total	Report
10 Sep	15:30	Slovenia	3–0	Austria	25–20	25–21	25–20			75–61	Report
10 Sep	20:00	Serbia	3–0	Turkey	25–16	25–18	25–20			75–54	Report
11 Sep	15:30	Slovenia	1–3	Serbia	9–25	23–25	25–23	23–25		80–98	Report
11 Sep	20:10	Austria	0–3	Turkey	21–25	22–25	20–25			63–75	Report
12 Sep	15:30	Turkey	2–3	Slovenia	18–25	23–25	25–16	25–19	12–15	103–100	Report
12 Sep	20:10	Austria	0–3	Serbia	16–25	19–25	16–25			51–75	Report

=== Pool B ===
Pos	Team	Pld	W	L	Pts	SW	SL	SR	SPW	SPL	SPR	Qualification
1	Russia	3	3	0	9	9	1	9.000	248	179	1.385	Quarterfinals
2	Czech Republic	3	2	1	5	6	5	1.200	232	228	1.018	Playoffs
3	Estonia	3	1	2	3	3	6	0.500	182	212	0.858	Playoffs
4	Portugal	3	0	3	1	3	9	0.333	236	279	0.846	

Date	Time		Score		Set 1	Set 2	Set 3	Set 4	Set 5	Total	Report
10 Sep	15:00	Russia	3–0	Estonia	25–17	25–19	25–17			75–53	Report
10 Sep	18:00	Portugal	2–3	Czech Republic	20–25	25–20	25–21	16–25	13–15	99–106	Report
11 Sep	15:00	Portugal	1–3	Russia	15–25	25–23	22–25	13–25		75–98	Report
11 Sep	18:00	Czech Republic	3–0	Estonia	25–20	25–14	25–20			75–54	Report
12 Sep	15:00	Estonia	3–0	Portugal	25–23	25–17	25–22			75–62	Report
12 Sep	18:00	Czech Republic	0–3	Russia	19–25	14–25	18–25			51–75	Report

=== Pool C ===
Pos	Team	Pld	W	L	Pts	SW	SL	SR	SPW	SPL	SPR	Qualification
1	Italy	3	2	1	7	8	4	2.000	280	267	1.049	Quarterfinals
2	France	3	2	1	5	7	6	1.167	323	312	1.035	Playoffs
3	Finland	3	1	2	3	4	6	0.667	238	243	0.979	Playoffs
4	Belgium	3	1	2	3	4	7	0.571	266	285	0.933	

Date	Time		Score		Set 1	Set 2	Set 3	Set 4	Set 5	Total	Report
10 Sep	15:00	France	3–1	Finland	25–14	17–25	31–29	28–26		101–94	Report
10 Sep	18:00	Belgium	1–3	Italy	25–22	18–25	27–29	15–25		85–101	Report
11 Sep	15:00	Belgium	3–1	France	31–29	34–36	25–20	26–24		116–109	Report
11 Sep	18:00	Italy	3–0	Finland	25–23	27–25	25–21			77–69	Report
12 Sep	16:00	Finland	3–0	Belgium	25–21	25–22	25–22			75–65	Report
12 Sep	19:00	Italy	2–3	France	28–26	25–22	17–25	21–25	11–15	102–113	Report

=== Pool D ===
Pos	Team	Pld	W	L	Pts	SW	SL	SR	SPW	SPL	SPR	Qualification
1	Slovakia	3	3	0	8	9	4	2.250	313	300	1.043	Quarterfinals
2	Bulgaria	3	2	1	7	8	5	1.600	310	295	1.051	Playoffs
3	Poland	3	1	2	3	5	7	0.714	276	278	0.993	Playoffs
4	Germany	3	0	3	0	3	9	0.333	274	300	0.913	

Date	Time		Score		Set 1	Set 2	Set 3	Set 4	Set 5	Total	Report
10 Sep	15:00	Slovakia	3–2	Bulgaria	26–24	27–25	24–26	19–25	17–15	113–115	Report
10 Sep	18:00	Germany	1–3	Poland	19–25	20–25	25–22	22–25		86–97	Report
11 Sep	15:00	Germany	1–3	Slovakia	23–25	26–24	24–26	25–27		98–102	Report
11 Sep	18:00	Poland	1–3	Bulgaria	25–19	22–25	22–25	23–25		92–94	Report
12 Sep	15:00	Bulgaria	3–1	Germany	25–16	25–27	26–24	25–23		101–90	Report
12 Sep	18:00	Poland	1–3	Slovakia	25–23	21–25	18–25	23–25		87–98	Report

== Final round ==
- All times are Central European Summer Time (UTC+02:00).

Play-off; 14 September
Slovenia	2
Finland	3
Czech Republic	1
Poland	3
France	3
Turkey	1
Bulgaria	3
Estonia	0

Quarterfinals; 15 September
Italy	3
Finland	1
Slovakia	0
Poland	3
Serbia	3
France	1
Russia	3
Bulgaria	1

Semifinals; 17 September
Italy	3
Poland	0
Serbia	3
Russia	2

Final; 18 September
Italy	1
Serbia	3
Third place
Poland	3
Russia	1

=== Playoffs ===
Date	Time	Venue		Score		Set 1	Set 2	Set 3	Set 4	Set 5	Total	Report
14 Sep	15:00	KVA	Bulgaria	3–0	Estonia	25–20	25–23	25–22			75–65	75–65
14 Sep	15:30	WSD	France	3–1	Turkey	25–19	25–23	19–25	25–21		94–88	94–88
14 Sep	18:00	KVA	Czech Republic	1–3	Poland	23–25	25–22	29–31	18–25		95–103	95–103
14 Sep	20:10	WSD	Slovenia	2–3	Finland	18–25	25–21	23–25	25–18	12–15	103–104	103–104

=== Quarterfinals ===
Date	Time	Venue		Score		Set 1	Set 2	Set 3	Set 4	Set 5	Total	Report
15 Sep	15:00	KVA	Slovakia	0–3	Poland	23–25	17–25	19–25			59–75	59–75
15 Sep	16:00	WSD	Italy	3–1	Finland	25–18	25–20	29–31	25–21		104–90	104–90
15 Sep	18:00	KVA	Russia	3–1	Bulgaria	22–25	25–19	25–18	25–19		97–81	97–81
15 Sep	19:00	WSD	Serbia	3–1	France	32–30	25–20	23–25	26–24		106–99	106–99

=== Semifinals ===
Date	Time	Venue		Score		Set 1	Set 2	Set 3	Set 4	Set 5	Total	Report
17 Sep	15:00	WSD	Italy	3–0	Poland	25–22	25–21	25–20			75–63	75–63
17 Sep	18:00	WSD	Serbia	3–2	Russia	25–23	17–25	22–25	33–31	15–13	112–117	112–117

=== 3rd place match ===
Date	Time	Venue		Score		Set 1	Set 2	Set 3	Set 4	Set 5	Total	Report
18 Sep	15:00	WSD	Poland	3–1	Russia	25–23	18–25	25–21	25–19		93–88	93–88

=== Final ===
Date	Time	Venue		Score		Set 1	Set 2	Set 3	Set 4	Set 5	Total	Report
18 Sep	18:00	WSD	Italy	1–3	Serbia	25–17	20–25	23–25	24–26		92–93	92–93

== Final standing ==
Rank	Team
1st place, gold medalist(s)	Serbia
2nd place, silver medalist(s)	Italy
3rd place, bronze medalist(s)	Poland
4	Russia
5	Slovakia
6	Bulgaria
7	France
8	Finland
9	Slovenia
10	Czech Republic
11	Turkey
12	Estonia
13	Belgium
14	Portugal
15	Germany
16	Austria

Qualified for the 2011 World Cup
Qualified as wild card for the 2011 World Cup

2011 Men's European champions

Serbia
2nd title

14–man Roster
N. Kovačević, U. Kovačević, Petković, Terzić, Stanković, Vujić, Nikić, Mitić, Rašić, Miljković, Starović, Atanasijević, Podraščanin, Rosić
Head coach
Kolaković

== Awards ==
- Most valuable player
  (Serbia) Ivan Miljković
- Best scorer
  (Russia) Maxim Mikhaylov
- Best spiker
  (Russia) Maxim Mikhaylov
- Best blocker
  (Serbia) Marko Podraščanin
- Best server
  (Poland) Bartosz Kurek
- Best setter
  (Italy) Dragan Travica
- Best receiver
  (Serbia) Nikola Kovačević
- Best libero
  (Italy) Andrea Bari

== See also ==
- 2011 Women's European Volleyball Championship
