= Željko Tanasković =

Serbian volleyball player (born 1967)

President of International School Sport Federation (ISF)
- Incumbent
- Assumed office 27 October 2024
- Preceded by: Laurent Petrynka

President of JSD Partizan
- Incumbent
- Assumed office 1 February 2025
- Preceded by: Ostoja Mijailović

Personal details
- Born: 8 July 1967 (age 59) Lučani, SR Serbia, SFR Yugoslavia
- Party: SPS; JUL
- Volleyball career
- Height: 1.98 m (6 ft 6 in)
- Weight: 94 kg (207 lb)

Coaching information
- Previous teams coached
- Years: Teams
- 2015: Vizura
- Position: Middle Blocker

Career
- Years: Team
- 1984–1992 1992–1993 1993–1997 1997–2000: Partizan; Panathinaikos; Ktisifon Peania; Crvena zvezda

National team
- Years: Team
- 1989–1991 1995–1999: Yugoslavia; FR Yugoslavia
Honours
Men's volleyball
Representing FR Yugoslavia
Olympic Games
Bronze medal – third place	1996 Atlanta
World Championship
Silver medal – second place	1998 Japan
European Championship
Silver medal – second place	1997 Netherlands
Bronze medal – third place	1995 Greece
Representing Yugoslavia
Mediterranean Games
Silver medal – second place	1991 Athens

Željko Tanasković (Serbian Cyrillic: Жељко Танасковић, born 8 July 1967 in Lučani) is a Serbian former volleyball player. With national team he won bronze and silver medals at the European Championships in 1995 and 1997, bronze medals at the Olympic Games and the World Cup in 1996, and a silver medal at the World Championships in 1998 year. He was captain of the volleyball team of Yugoslavia. In 1996 he was part of the Yugoslav team which won the bronze medal in the Olympic tournament. He played all eight matches.
