= Filip Vujić =

Serbian volleyball player (born 1989)

Personal information
- Full name: Filip Vujić
- Born: 17 October 1989 (age 37); Belgrade, SR Serbia, SFR Yugoslavia
- Height: 1.91 m (6 ft 3 in)
- Weight: 85 kg (187 lb)
- Spike: 335 cm (132 in)
- Block: 315 cm (124 in)

Volleyball information
- Position: Libero
- Current club: (Serbia) OK Crvena Zvezda

National team
Serbia
Honours
Men's volleyball
Representing Serbia
European Championship
Gold medal – first place	2011 Austria / Czech Republic
Bronze medal – third place	2013 Denmark / Poland

Filip "Fića" Vujić (Serbian: Филип Вујић, born 17 October 1989 in Belgrade, SR Serbia, Yugoslavia) is a Serbian volleyball player (libero). He was a member of the national team at the 2011 European Championship when Serbia won the gold medal.
