= Žarko Petrović =

Serbian volleyball player (1964–2007)

Medal record

Men's volleyball

Representing Yugoslavia

Olympic Games
Bronze medal – third place	1996 Atlanta	Team

Žarko Petrović (Serbian Cyrillic: Жарко Петровић, October 27, 1964 – April 2, 2007) was a Serbian volleyball player who competed for Yugoslavia in the 1996 Summer Olympics.

He was born in Novi Sad, but spent his young age in Maglić, where he made his first volleyball steps, playing for OK Maglić. At the age of 17 in 1982 he moved to Novi Sad, where he started playing for OK Vojvodina.

He died in Novi Sad in 2007.

In 1996 he was part of the Yugoslav team which won the bronze medal in the Olympic tournament. He played all eight matches.
