= Veljko Petković (volleyball) =

Serbian volleyball player (born 1977)

Personal information
- Born: 23 January 1977 (age 49)
- Height: 199 cm (6 ft 6 in)
Honours
Men's volleyball
Representing FR Yugoslavia
Olympic Games
Gold medal – first place	2000 Sydney	Team
World Championship
Silver medal – second place	1998 Japan	Team

Veljko Petković (Serbian Cyrillic: Вељко Петковић, born 23 January 1977) is a Serbian volleyball player who competed for Yugoslavia in the 2000 Summer Olympics.
