= Goran Vujević =

Montenegrin volleyball player (born 1973)

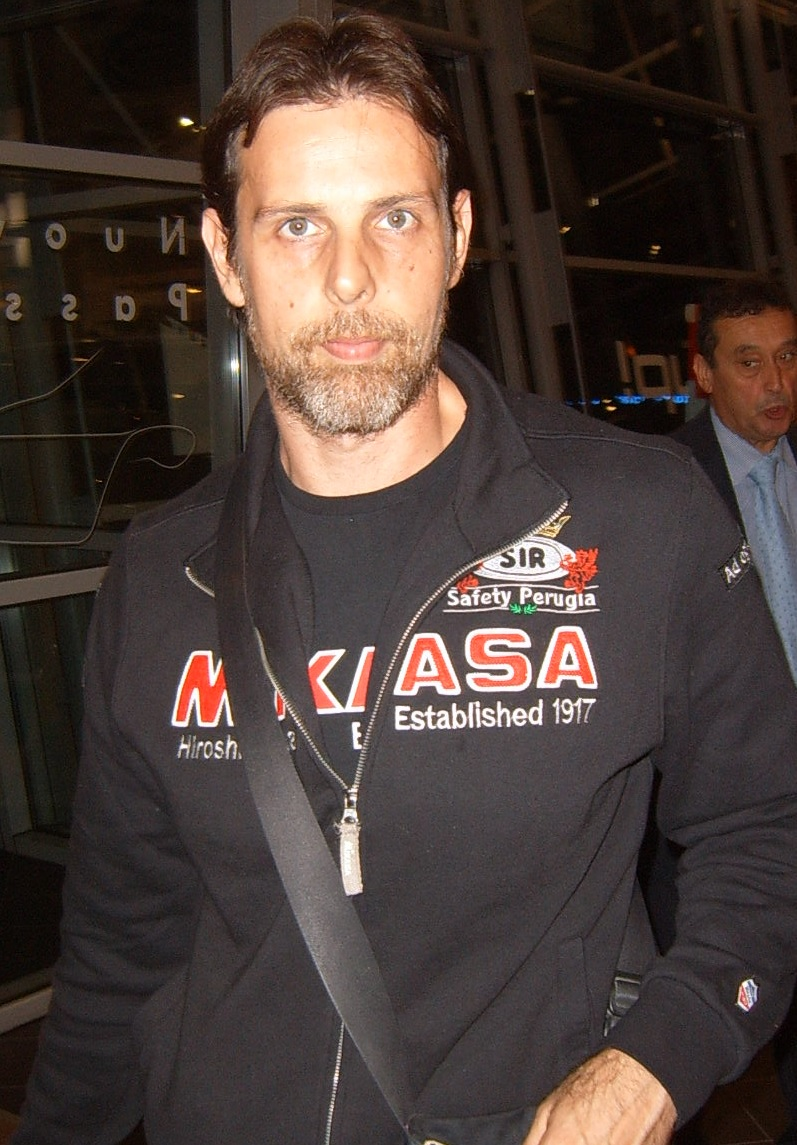
- Vujević with Sir Safety Perugia in 2013

Personal information
- Nationality: Montenegrin
- Born: 27 February 1973 (age 53); Cetinje, SR Montenegro, SFR Yugoslavia
- Height: 192 cm (6 ft 4 in)

National team
1995–2003; 2003–2006	(Federal Republic of Yugoslavia) FR Yugoslavia (Federal Republic of Yugoslavia) Serbia and Montenegrin
Honours
Men's volleyball
Representing FR Yugoslavia
Olympic Games
Gold medal – first place	2000 Sydney	Team
Bronze medal – third place	1996 Atlanta	Team
World Championship
Silver medal – second place	1998 Japan	Team
World Grand Champions Cup
Bronze medal – third place	2001 Japan	Team
World League
Bronze medal – third place	2002 Belo Horizonte	Team
European Championship
Gold medal – first place	2001 Czech Republic	Team
Silver medal – second place	1997 Netherlands	Team
Bronze medal – third place	1999 Austria	Team
Bronze medal – third place	1995 Greece	Team
Representing Serbia and Montenegro
World Cup
Bronze medal – third place	2003 Japan	Team
World League
Silver medal – second place	2003 Madrid	Team
Silver medal – second place	2005 Belgrade	Team
Bronze medal – third place	2004 Rome	Team
European Championship
Bronze medal – third place	2005 Italy/Serbia and Montenegro	Team

Goran Vujević (Serbian Cyrillic: Горан Вујевић; born 27 February 1973) is a Montenegrin volleyball player who competed for Yugoslavia in the 1996 Summer Olympics and in the 2000 Summer Olympics and for Serbia and Montenegro in the 2004 Summer Olympics.

He was born in Cetinje. In 1996, he was part of the Yugoslav team which won the bronze medal in the Olympic tournament and gold medal in the 2000 Olympic Games held in Sydney.

At the 2004 Games, he was a member of the Serbia and Montenegro team which was eliminated in the quarter-finals of the Olympic tournament.
