= Đorđe Đurić (volleyball) =

Serbian volleyball player (born 1971)

Medal record

Men's volleyball

Representing Yugoslavia

Olympic Games
Bronze medal – third place	1996 Atlanta	Team

World Championship
Silver medal – second place	1998 Japan	

Đorđe Đurić (Serbian Cyrillic: Ђорђе Ђурић, born 24 April 1971) is a Serbian volleyball player who competed for Yugoslavia in the 1996 Summer Olympics.

He was born in Ljubinje, Bosnia and Herzegovina, Yugoslavia.

In 1996 he was part of the Yugoslav team which won the bronze medal in the Olympic tournament. He played five matches.
