= Vladimir Grbić =

Serbian volleyball player (born 1970)

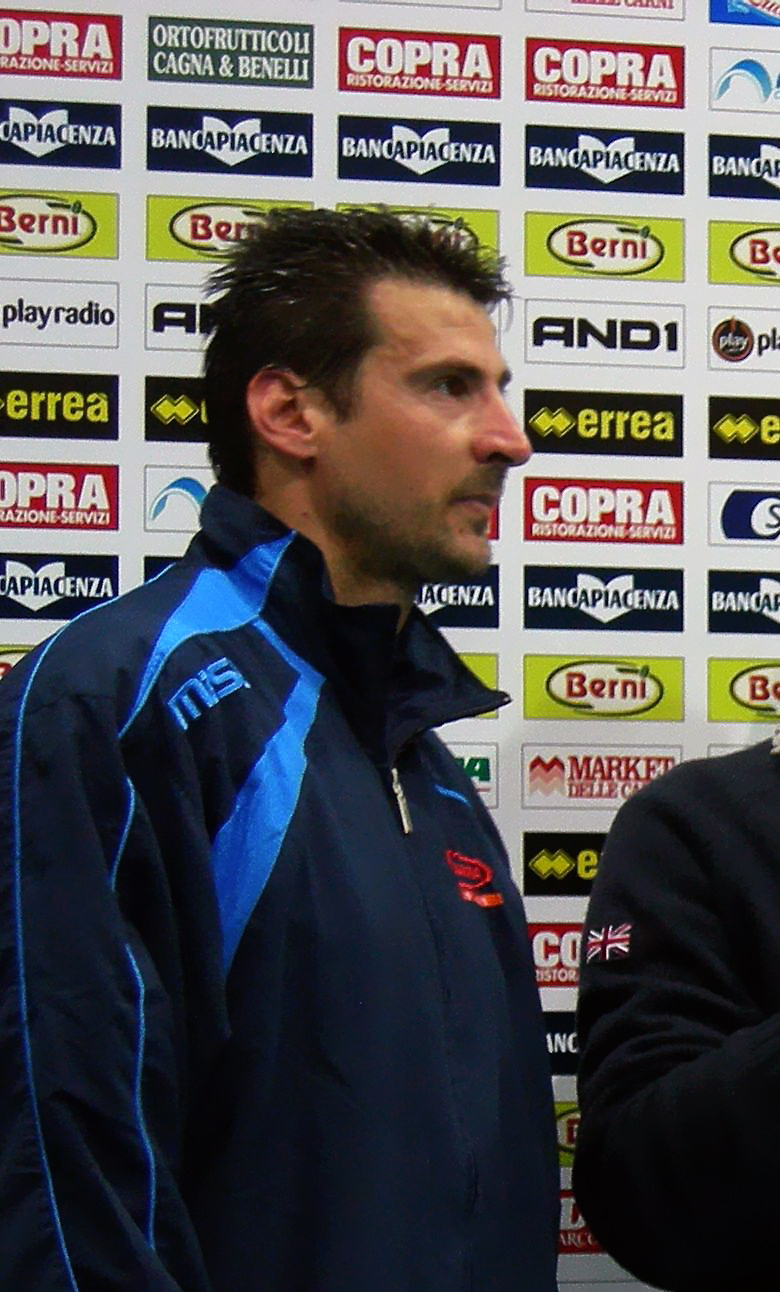
- Grbić in 2007

Personal information
- Full name: Vladimir Grbić
- Nickname: Vanja
- Born: 14 December 1970 (age 55); Klek, SR Serbia, SFR Yugoslavia
- Height: 1.93 m (6 ft 4 in)
- Weight: 87 kg (192 lb)
- Spike: 360 cm (140 in)
- Block: 350 cm (140 in)

Career
Years	Teams
1990–1991; 1991–1992; 1992–1995; 1995–1997; 1997–1998; 1998–2001; 2001–2002; 2002–2003; 2003–2004; 2004–2007; 2007–2009	Mladost Zagreb; Vojvodina Novi Sad; Antonveneta Padova; Bre Banca Lannutti Cuneo; São Paulo; Roma Volley; Osaka Blazers; PAOK; Dynamo Moscow; Andreoli Latina; Fenerbahçe Istanbul

National team
1991–1993; 1995–2003; 2003–2006	Yugoslavia; FR Yugoslavia; Serbia and Montenegro
Honours
Men's volleyball
Representing Serbia and Montenegro
Olympic Games
Gold medal – first place	2000 Sydney	Team competition
Bronze medal – third place	1996 Atlanta	Team competition
World Championship
Silver medal – second place	1998 Japan	Team competition
European Championship
Gold medal – first place	2001 Czech Republic	Team competition
Silver medal – second place	1997 Netherlands	Team competition
Bronze medal – third place	1995 Greece	Team competition
Bronze medal – third place	1999 Austria	Team competition
World Grand Champions Cup
Bronze medal – third place	2001 Japan	Team competition
World Cup
Bronze medal – third place	2003 Japan	Team competition
World League
Silver medal – second place	2003 Madrid	Team competition
Bronze medal – third place	2002 Belo Horizonte	Team competition
Bronze medal – third place	2004 Rome	Team competition
Mediterranean Games
Silver medal – second place	1991 Athens	Team competition

Vladimir "Vanja" Grbić (Serbian Cyrillic: Владимир Вања Грбић; born 14 December 1970) is a Serbian former volleyball player and three-time Olympian. He is 193 cm and played as passer-side attacker. Widely regarded as one of the greatest volleyball players of all time, Grbić was inducted into the International Volleyball Hall of Fame in 2011.

== Career ==
While playing with the national volleyball team of FR Yugoslavia, Grbić won a bronze medal in the 1996 Summer Olympics and a gold medal in the 2000 Summer Olympics. He competed in the 2004 Summer Olympics with the team of Serbia and Montenegro, finishing fifth.

The Yugoslav Olympic Committee declared Grbić the best sportsman of the year in 1996 and 2000. In 1999 and 2000, he received the Golden Badge, an award for the best athlete in Yugoslavia.

In his career, Grbić made 242 appearances for the national team until his retirement in 2009. Grbić was known for his powerful spikes and excellent passing on the volleyball court. He was also regarded as a sportsman of great character.

== Personal life ==
Grbić's father, Miloš, also played volleyball and was a member of the Yugoslavian national team. His younger brother, Nikola, was also a volleyball player on the national team, and similarly is in the Hall of Fame. Grbić's wife, Sara, is a former karate world champion.

== Clubs ==
Club	Country	From	To
Mladost Zagreb	Yugoslavia	1990	1991
Vojvodina Novi Sad	Yugoslavia	1991	1992
Antonveneta Padova	Italy	1992	1995
Bre Banca Lannutti Cuneo	Italy	1995	1997
São Paulo	Brazil	1997	1998
Roma Volley	Italy	1998	2001
Osaka Blazers	Japan	2001	2002
P.A.O.K.	Greece	2002	2003
Dynamo Moscow	Russia	2003	2004
Andreoli Latina	Italy	2004	2007
Fenerbahçe Istanbul	Turkey	2007	2009

Awards
Preceded by Dejan Bodiroga	(Federal Republic of Yugoslavia) The Best Athlete of Yugoslavia; 1999, 2000	Succeeded by Aleksandar Šoštar
Olympic Games
Preceded by Igor Milanović	Flagbearer for FR Yugoslavia; Sydney 2000	Succeeded by Dejan Bodiroga (for Serbia and Montenegro)
