= Igor Vušurović =

Montenegrin volleyball player (born 1974)

Personal information
- Born: 24 September 1974 (age 52); Ivangrad, SR Montenegro, SFR Yugoslavia
- Height: 204 cm (6 ft 8 in)
Medal record
Men's volleyball
Representing FR Yugoslavia
Olympic Games
Gold medal – first place	2000 Sydney	Team
European Championship
Gold medal – first place	2001 Ostrava	Team

Igor Vušurović (born 24 September 1974) is a former Montenegrin volleyball player, who won the gold medal with the Yugoslav Men's National Team at the 2000 Summer Olympics. Standing at 2.00 m (6 ft 7 in), he played as a middle blocker.
