= 2003 FIVB Volleyball World League =

International sport competition

2003 World League
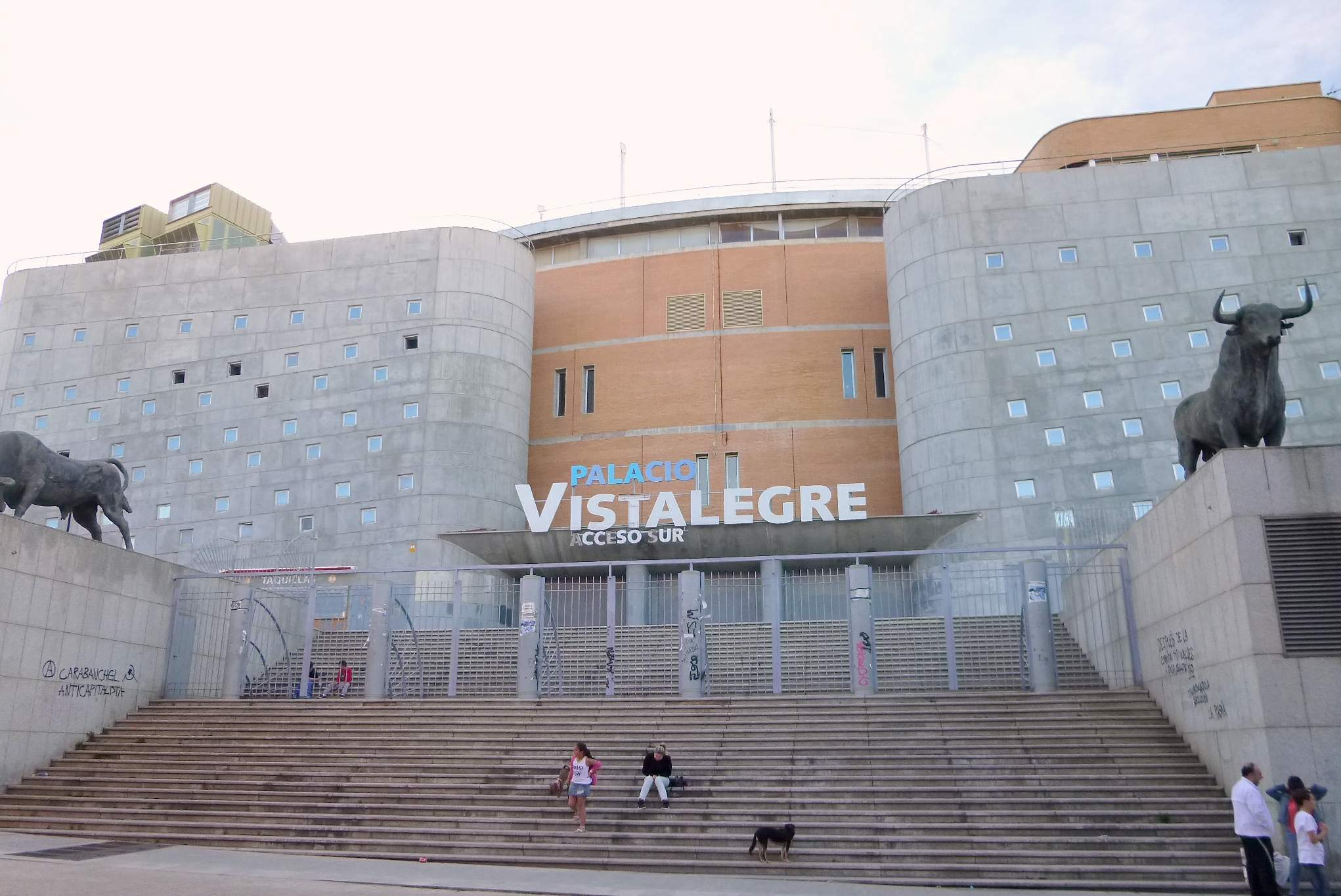
- The Palacio Vistalegre held the final

Tournament details
- Host country: Spain (Final)
- Dates: 16 May – 13 July
- Teams: 16

Final positions
- Champions: Brazil (3rd title)

Tournament awards
- MVP: (Serbia and Montenegro) Ivan Miljković

The 2003 FIVB Volleyball World League was the 14th edition of the annual men's international volleyball tournament, played by 16 countries from 16 May to 13 July 2003. The Final Round was held in Madrid, Spain.

== Pools composition ==
| Pool A | Pool B | Pool C | Pool D |
|---|---|---|---|
| Russia; Poland; Spain; Venezuela | Brazil; Italy; Portugal; Germany | Serbia and Montenegro; Netherlands; Cuba; Bulgaria | France; Czech Republic; Greece; Japan |

== Intercontinental round ==
- The top two teams in each pool will qualify for the Final Round. If the Final Round hosts Spain finish lower than second in their pool, they will still qualify along with the best three second teams across all four pools.

=== Pool A ===
| Pos | Team | Pld | W | L | Pts | SW | SL | SR | SPW | SPL | SPR | Qualification |
|---|---|---|---|---|---|---|---|---|---|---|---|---|
| 1 | Russia | 12 | 10 | 2 | 22 | 31 | 13 | 2.385 | 1054 | 917 | 1.149 | Final round |
| 2 | Poland | 12 | 6 | 6 | 18 | 24 | 21 | 1.143 | 1034 | 1010 | 1.024 | |
| 3 | Spain (Note: Qualified as hosts) (H) | 12 | 5 | 7 | 17 | 23 | 31 | 0.742 | 1177 | 1239 | 0.950 | Final round |
| 4 | Venezuela | 12 | 3 | 9 | 15 | 16 | 29 | 0.552 | 948 | 1047 | 0.905 | |

(H) Host
Notes:

| Date | | Score | | Set 1 | Set 2 | Set 3 | Set 4 | Set 5 | Total | Report |
|---|---|---|---|---|---|---|---|---|---|---|
| 24 May | Spain | 3–2 | Poland | 25–27 | 29–31 | 26–24 | 25–22 | 16–14 | 121–118 | P2 |
| 24 May | Venezuela | 1–3 | Russia | 25–16 | 21–25 | 13–25 | 15–25 | | 74–91 | P2 |
| 25 May | Venezuela | 0–3 | Russia | 15–25 | 17–25 | 22–25 | | | 54–75 | P2 |
| 25 May | Spain | 3–2 | Poland | 18–25 | 27–25 | 24–26 | 25–23 | 15–11 | 109–110 | P2 |
| 30 May | Russia | 3–1 | Spain | 18–25 | 25–19 | 25–20 | 25–18 | | 93–82 | P2 |
| 31 May | Venezuela | 0–3 | Poland | 17–25 | 21–25 | 18–25 | | | 56–75 | P2 |
| 31 May | Russia | 3–1 | Spain | 25–19 | 24–26 | 25–15 | 25–20 | | 99–80 | P2 |
| 1 Jun | Venezuela | 1–3 | Poland | 24–26 | 25–20 | 19–25 | 21–25 | | 89–96 | P2 |
| 6 Jun | Spain | 2–3 | Russia | 18–25 | 23–25 | 26–24 | 25–23 | 9–15 | 101–112 | P2 |
| 6 Jun | Poland | 0–3 | Venezuela | 20–25 | 22–25 | 20–25 | | | 62–75 | P2 |
| 7 Jun | Poland | 3–0 | Venezuela | 25–18 | 25–13 | 25–23 | | | 75–54 | P2 |
| 8 Jun | Spain | 1–3 | Russia | 24–26 | 25–20 | 21–25 | 23–25 | | 93–96 | P2 |
| 13 Jun | Russia | 3–0 | Venezuela | 25–23 | 25–17 | 27–25 | | | 77–65 | P2 |
| 13 Jun | Poland | 3–1 | Spain | 25–22 | 33–31 | 15–25 | 25–14 | | 98–92 | P2 |
| 14 Jun | Poland | 2–3 | Spain | 22–25 | 25–18 | 22–25 | 25–17 | 11–15 | 105–100 | P2 |
| 14 Jun | Russia | 3–1 | Venezuela | 25–14 | 22–25 | 25–13 | 25–21 | | 97–73 | P2 |
| 20 Jun | Spain | 3–2 | Venezuela | 23–25 | 26–24 | 25–23 | 23–25 | 15–13 | 112–110 | P2 |
| 20 Jun | Poland | 0–3 | Russia | 19–25 | 20–25 | 20–25 | | | 59–75 | P2 |
| 21 Jun | Poland | 3–1 | Russia | 25–22 | 31–33 | 25–21 | 25–17 | | 106–93 | P2 |
| 22 Jun | Spain | 1–3 | Venezuela | 25–19 | 22–25 | 22–25 | 16–25 | | 85–94 | P2 |
| 27 Jun | Russia | 3–0 | Poland | 25–15 | 25–20 | 25–14 | | | 75–49 | P2 |
| 28 Jun | Venezuela | 3–1 | Spain | 22–25 | 25–22 | 26–24 | 26–24 | | 99–95 | P2 |
| 28 Jun | Russia | 0–3 | Poland | 23–25 | 19–25 | 29–31 | | | 71–81 | P2 |
| 29 Jun | Venezuela | 2–3 | Spain | 22–25 | 25–20 | 20–25 | 25–22 | 13–15 | 105–107 | P2 |

=== Pool B ===
| Pos | Team | Pld | W | L | Pts | SW | SL | SR | SPW | SPL | SPR | Qualification |
|---|---|---|---|---|---|---|---|---|---|---|---|---|
| 1 | Brazil | 12 | 10 | 2 | 22 | 32 | 13 | 2.462 | 1074 | 946 | 1.135 | Final round |
| 2 | Italy | 12 | 8 | 4 | 20 | 28 | 16 | 1.750 | 1063 | 985 | 1.079 | Final round |
| 3 | Germany | 12 | 4 | 8 | 16 | 20 | 29 | 0.690 | 1053 | 1148 | 0.917 | |
| 4 | Portugal | 12 | 2 | 10 | 14 | 11 | 33 | 0.333 | 929 | 1040 | 0.893 | |

| Date | | Score | | Set 1 | Set 2 | Set 3 | Set 4 | Set 5 | Total | Report |
|---|---|---|---|---|---|---|---|---|---|---|
| 23 May | Italy | 3–0 | Portugal | 25–16 | 25–18 | 25–19 | | | 75–53 | P2 |
| 24 May | Brazil | 3–0 | Germany | 25–15 | 29–27 | 25–19 | | | 79–61 | P2 |
| 25 May | Brazil | 3–1 | Germany | 25–16 | 23–25 | 25–13 | 25–14 | | 98–68 | P2 |
| 25 May | Italy | 3–0 | Portugal | 25–19 | 27–25 | 25–18 | | | 77–62 | P2 |
| 30 May | Italy | 1–3 | Brazil | 23–25 | 23–25 | 25–19 | 23–25 | | 94–94 | P2 |
| 31 May | Portugal | 2–3 | Germany | 25–23 | 19–25 | 25–18 | 24–26 | 9–15 | 102–107 | P2 |
| 1 Jun | Portugal | 3–1 | Germany | 25–21 | 24–26 | 25–19 | 25–17 | | 99–83 | P2 |
| 1 Jun | Italy | 3–2 | Brazil | 23–25 | 21–25 | 25–21 | 25–22 | 16–14 | 110–107 | P2 |
| 7 Jun | Germany | 1–3 | Italy | 19–25 | 24–26 | 25–22 | 16–25 | | 84–98 | P2 |
| 7 Jun | Portugal | 0–3 | Brazil | 21–25 | 25–27 | 22–25 | | | 68–77 | P2 |
| 8 Jun | Germany | 1–3 | Italy | 18–25 | 25–19 | 22–25 | 29–31 | | 94–100 | P2 |
| 8 Jun | Portugal | 0–3 | Brazil | 19–25 | 23–25 | 15–25 | | | 57–75 | P2 |
| 14 Jun | Germany | 2–3 | Brazil | 18–25 | 23–25 | 25–22 | 25–21 | 9–15 | 100–108 | P2 |
| 14 Jun | Portugal | 0–3 | Italy | 22–25 | 22–25 | 26–28 | | | 70–78 | P2 |
| 15 Jun | Germany | 0–3 | Brazil | 21–25 | 19–25 | 20–25 | | | 60–75 | P2 |
| 15 Jun | Portugal | 0–3 | Italy | 21–25 | 15–25 | 21–25 | | | 57–75 | P2 |
| 21 Jun | Brazil | 0–3 | Italy | 27–29 | 23–25 | 19–25 | | | 69–79 | P2 |
| 21 Jun | Germany | 2–3 | Portugal | 25–22 | 17–25 | 23–25 | 25–23 | 11–15 | 101–110 | P2 |
| 22 Jun | Brazil | 3–1 | Italy | 23–25 | 27–25 | 25–22 | 25–21 | | 100–93 | P2 |
| 22 Jun | Germany | 3–1 | Portugal | 17–25 | 25–22 | 33–31 | 25–17 | | 100–95 | P2 |
| 27 Jun | Brazil | 3–1 | Portugal | 21–25 | 25–16 | 25–14 | 25–19 | | 96–74 | P2 |
| 27 Jun | Italy | 1–3 | Germany | 23–25 | 28–26 | 22–25 | 22–25 | | 95–101 | P2 |
| 28 Jun | Brazil | 3–1 | Portugal | 25–16 | 25–23 | 21–25 | 25–18 | | 96–82 | P2 |
| 29 Jun | Italy | 1–3 | Germany | 25–19 | 21–25 | 21–25 | 22–25 | | 89–94 | P2 |

=== Pool C ===
| Pos | Team | Pld | W | L | Pts | SW | SL | SR | SPW | SPL | SPR | Qualification |
|---|---|---|---|---|---|---|---|---|---|---|---|---|
| 1 | Serbia and Montenegro | 12 | 8 | 4 | 20 | 30 | 19 | 1.579 | 1138 | 1054 | 1.080 | Final round |
| 2 | Bulgaria | 12 | 8 | 4 | 20 | 31 | 21 | 1.476 | 1185 | 1108 | 1.069 | Final round |
| 3 | Netherlands | 12 | 5 | 7 | 17 | 20 | 27 | 0.741 | 1029 | 1081 | 0.952 | |
| 4 | Cuba | 12 | 3 | 9 | 15 | 16 | 30 | 0.533 | 954 | 1063 | 0.897 | |

| Date | | Score | | Set 1 | Set 2 | Set 3 | Set 4 | Set 5 | Total | Report |
|---|---|---|---|---|---|---|---|---|---|---|
| 23 May | Bulgaria | 2–3 | Cuba | 25–20 | 25–18 | 22–25 | 29–31 | 13–15 | 114–109 | P2 |
| 24 May | Netherlands | 1–3 | Serbia and Montenegro | 25–20 | 21–25 | 16–25 | 18–25 | | 80–95 | P2 |
| 25 May | Bulgaria | 3–0 | Cuba | 25–19 | 32–30 | 25–15 | | | 82–64 | P2 |
| 25 May | Netherlands | 3–1 | Serbia and Montenegro | 25–23 | 20–25 | 32–30 | 25–22 | | 102–100 | P2 |
| 30 May | Serbia and Montenegro | 3–2 | Bulgaria | 26–24 | 23–25 | 25–22 | 18–25 | 15–13 | 107–109 | P2 |
| 31 May | Netherlands | 3–0 | Cuba | 25–22 | 25–16 | 25–20 | | | 75–58 | P2 |
| 1 Jun | Netherlands | 3–2 | Cuba | 19–25 | 18–25 | 25–19 | 25–21 | 15–12 | 102–102 | P2 |
| 1 Jun | Serbia and Montenegro | 2–3 | Bulgaria | 28–26 | 23–25 | 20–25 | 26–24 | 9–15 | 106–115 | P2 |
| 6 Jun | Netherlands | 1–3 | Bulgaria | 25–22 | 23–25 | 21–25 | 20–25 | | 89–97 | P2 |
| 7 Jun | Netherlands | 2–3 | Bulgaria | 22–25 | 24–26 | 25–20 | 25–21 | 12–15 | 108–107 | P2 |
| 6 Jun | Cuba | 2–3 | Serbia and Montenegro | 25–21 | 21–25 | 25–17 | 17–25 | 11–15 | 99–103 | P2 |
| 7 Jun | Cuba | 1–3 | Serbia and Montenegro | 20–25 | 26–24 | 23–25 | 21–25 | | 90–99 | P2 |
| 13 Jun | Bulgaria | 3–0 | Netherlands | 25–22 | 25–18 | 25–18 | | | 75–58 | P2 |
| 13 Jun | Serbia and Montenegro | 3–0 | Cuba | 25–19 | 25–17 | 25–19 | | | 75–55 | P2 |
| 15 Jun | Bulgaria | 2–3 | Netherlands | 22–25 | 21–25 | 25–19 | 25–20 | 9–15 | 102–104 | P2 |
| 15 Jun | Serbia and Montenegro | 3–0 | Cuba | 25–16 | 25–13 | 25–18 | | | 75–47 | P2 |
| 20 Jun | Bulgaria | 3–1 | Serbia and Montenegro | 23–25 | 25–20 | 25–21 | 25–22 | | 98–88 | P2 |
| 21 Jun | Bulgaria | 3–2 | Serbia and Montenegro | 14–25 | 25–23 | 25–22 | 20–25 | 15–11 | 99–106 | P2 |
| 20 Jun | Cuba | 3–0 | Netherlands | 25–18 | 25–23 | 25–19 | | | 75–60 | P2 |
| 21 Jun | Cuba | 1–3 | Netherlands | 19–25 | 19–25 | 25–16 | 23–25 | | 86–91 | P2 |
| 27 Jun | Serbia and Montenegro | 3–0 | Netherlands | 27–25 | 25–17 | 25–23 | | | 77–65 | P2 |
| 27 Jun | Cuba | 1–3 | Bulgaria | 20–25 | 25–22 | 19–25 | 13–25 | | 77–97 | P2 |
| 28 Jun | Serbia and Montenegro | 3–1 | Netherlands | 34–32 | 23–25 | 25–20 | 25–18 | | 107–95 | P2 |
| 28 Jun | Cuba | 3–1 | Bulgaria | 25–20 | 17–25 | 25–23 | 25–22 | | 92–90 | P2 |

=== Pool D ===
| Pos | Team | Pld | W | L | Pts | SW | SL | SR | SPW | SPL | SPR | Qualification |
|---|---|---|---|---|---|---|---|---|---|---|---|---|
| 1 | Czech Republic | 12 | 8 | 4 | 20 | 29 | 19 | 1.526 | 1084 | 1043 | 1.039 | Final round |
| 2 | Greece | 12 | 7 | 5 | 19 | 24 | 25 | 0.960 | 1092 | 1100 | 0.993 | Final round |
| 3 | France | 12 | 6 | 6 | 18 | 26 | 20 | 1.300 | 1091 | 1037 | 1.052 | |
| 4 | Japan | 12 | 3 | 9 | 15 | 16 | 31 | 0.516 | 1013 | 1100 | 0.921 | |

| Date | | Score | | Set 1 | Set 2 | Set 3 | Set 4 | Set 5 | Total | Report |
|---|---|---|---|---|---|---|---|---|---|---|
| 16 May | France | 3–1 | Czech Republic | 20–25 | 25–23 | 25–19 | 25–17 | | 95–84 | P2 |
| 16 May | Greece | 3–0 | Japan | 25–19 | 25–20 | 25–16 | | | 75–55 | P2 |
| 17 May | France | 3–0 | Czech Republic | 25–18 | 25–22 | 25–22 | | | 75–62 | P2 |
| 17 May | Greece | 3–1 | Japan | 25–20 | 25–17 | 22–25 | 25–16 | | 97–78 | P2 |
| 23 May | France | 1–3 | Japan | 15–25 | 24–26 | 25–22 | 21–25 | | 85–98 | P2 |
| 23 May | Greece | 3–2 | Czech Republic | 21–25 | 25–23 | 19–25 | 25–22 | 15–13 | 105–108 | P2 |
| 24 May | France | 3–1 | Japan | 25–16 | 25–18 | 22–25 | 29–27 | | 101–86 | P2 |
| 25 May | Greece | 0–3 | Czech Republic | 27–29 | 22–25 | 23–25 | | | 72–79 | P2 |
| 31 May | Czech Republic | 3–1 | France | 25–23 | 18–25 | 25–17 | 25–20 | | 93–85 | P2 |
| 31 May | Japan | 2–3 | Greece | 25–19 | 21–25 | 22–25 | 25–23 | 12–15 | 105–107 | P2 |
| 1 Jun | Japan | 3–2 | Greece | 26–28 | 25–16 | 25–22 | 22–25 | 15–13 | 113–104 | P2 |
| 1 Jun | Czech Republic | 3–2 | France | 19–25 | 25–18 | 19–25 | 26–24 | 18–16 | 107–108 | P2 |
| 6 Jun | Greece | 0–3 | France | 24–26 | 28–30 | 23–25 | | | 75–81 | P2 |
| 7 Jun | Czech Republic | 3–0 | Japan | 25–23 | 25–14 | 26–24 | | | 76–61 | P2 |
| 7 Jun | Greece | 3–1 | France | 25–20 | 16–25 | 30–28 | 28–26 | | 99–99 | P2 |
| 8 Jun | Czech Republic | 3–0 | Japan | 25–21 | 25–19 | 25–18 | | | 75–58 | P2 |
| 13 Jun | France | 2–3 | Greece | 24–26 | 28–30 | 25–22 | 25–21 | 13–15 | 115–114 | P2 |
| 14 Jun | Japan | 1–3 | Czech Republic | 20–25 | 22–25 | 25–22 | 22–25 | | 89–97 | P2 |
| 15 Jun | Japan | 2–3 | Czech Republic | 24–26 | 25–20 | 21–25 | 25–23 | 15–17 | 110–111 | P2 |
| 15 Jun | France | 3–0 | Greece | 25–20 | 25–20 | 25–19 | | | 75–59 | P2 |
| 21 Jun | Czech Republic | 3–1 | Greece | 21–25 | 25–16 | 25–20 | 25–13 | | 96–74 | P2 |
| 21 Jun | Japan | 0–3 | France | 26–28 | 26–28 | 17–25 | | | 69–81 | P2 |
| 22 Jun | Japan | 3–1 | France | 25–22 | 25–23 | 16–25 | 25–21 | | 91–91 | P2 |
| 22 Jun | Czech Republic | 2–3 | Greece | 21–25 | 25–23 | 25–23 | 17–25 | 8–15 | 96–111 | P2 |

== Final round ==
- Venue: Palacio Vistalegre, Madrid, Spain
- All times are Central European Summer Time (UTC+02:00).

=== Pool play ===
==== Pool E ====
| Pos | Team | Pld | W | L | Pts | SW | SL | SR | SPW | SPL | SPR | Qualification |
|---|---|---|---|---|---|---|---|---|---|---|---|---|
| 1 | Serbia and Montenegro | 3 | 3 | 0 | 6 | 9 | 2 | 4.500 | 262 | 236 | 1.110 | Semifinals |
| 2 | Czech Republic | 3 | 2 | 1 | 5 | 6 | 5 | 1.200 | 259 | 240 | 1.079 | Semifinals |
| 3 | Spain | 3 | 1 | 2 | 4 | 5 | 7 | 0.714 | 263 | 283 | 0.929 | |
| 4 | Greece | 3 | 0 | 3 | 3 | 3 | 9 | 0.333 | 256 | 281 | 0.911 | |

| Date | Time | | Score | | Set 1 | Set 2 | Set 3 | Set 4 | Set 5 | Total | Report |
|---|---|---|---|---|---|---|---|---|---|---|---|
| 08 Jul | 10:30 | Serbia and Montenegro | 3–0 | Czech Republic | 25–23 | 25–22 | 26–24 | | | 76–69 | P2 |
| 08 Jul | 20:00 | Spain | 3–1 | Greece | 22–25 | 25–21 | 25–22 | 25–23 | | 97–91 | P2 |
| 09 Jul | 13:00 | Greece | 1–3 | Czech Republic | 25–18 | 19–25 | 21–25 | 15–25 | | 80–93 | P2 |
| 09 Jul | 20:00 | Spain | 1–3 | Serbia and Montenegro | 19–25 | 20–25 | 25–20 | 18–25 | | 82–95 | P2 |
| 10 Jul | 13:00 | Serbia and Montenegro | 3–1 | Greece | 26–24 | 25–15 | 15–25 | 25–21 | | 91–85 | P2 |
| 10 Jul | 20:00 | Czech Republic | 3–1 | Spain | 25–15 | 25–21 | 22–25 | 25–23 | | 97–84 | P2 |

==== Pool F ====
| Pos | Team | Pld | W | L | Pts | SW | SL | SR | SPW | SPL | SPR | Qualification |
|---|---|---|---|---|---|---|---|---|---|---|---|---|
| 1 | Brazil | 3 | 3 | 0 | 6 | 9 | 3 | 3.000 | 291 | 250 | 1.164 | Semifinals |
| 2 | Italy | 3 | 1 | 2 | 4 | 6 | 7 | 0.857 | 299 | 292 | 1.024 | Semifinals |
| 3 | Bulgaria | 3 | 1 | 2 | 4 | 5 | 7 | 0.714 | 258 | 278 | 0.928 | |
| 4 | Russia | 3 | 1 | 2 | 4 | 5 | 8 | 0.625 | 269 | 297 | 0.906 | |

| Date | Time | | Score | | Set 1 | Set 2 | Set 3 | Set 4 | Set 5 | Total | Report |
|---|---|---|---|---|---|---|---|---|---|---|---|
| 08 Jul | 13:00 | Brazil | 3–1 | Bulgaria | 19–25 | 25–21 | 25–18 | 25–11 | | 94–75 | P2 |
| 08 Jul | 17:30 | Russia | 3–2 | Italy | 20–25 | 25–20 | 19–25 | 25–22 | 15–13 | 104–105 | P2 |
| 09 Jul | 10:30 | Bulgaria | 1–3 | Italy | 25–21 | 19–25 | 23–25 | 23–25 | | 90–96 | P2 |
| 09 Jul | 17:30 | Brazil | 3–1 | Russia | 25–19 | 24–26 | 25–17 | 25–15 | | 99–77 | P2 |
| 10 Jul | 10:30 | Bulgaria | 3–1 | Russia | 18–25 | 25–23 | 25–18 | 25–22 | | 93–88 | P2 |
| 10 Jul | 17:30 | Italy | 1–3 | Brazil | 29–31 | 21–25 | 25–17 | 23–25 | | 98–98 | P2 |

=== Final four ===
Semifinals
12 July
Serbia and Montenegro | 3
Italy | 0
12 July
Czech Republic | 0
Brazil | 3

Final
13 July
Serbia and Montenegro | 2
Brazil | 3
3rd place match
13 July
Italy | 3
Czech Republic | 1

==== Semifinals ====
| Date | Time | | Score | | Set 1 | Set 2 | Set 3 | Set 4 | Set 5 | Total | Report |
|---|---|---|---|---|---|---|---|---|---|---|---|
| 12 Jul | 11:00 | Serbia and Montenegro | 3–0 | Italy | 26–24 | 25–22 | 25–16 | | | 76–62 | P2 |
| 12 Jul | 13:30 | Czech Republic | 0–3 | Brazil | 12–25 | 20–25 | 18–25 | | | 50–75 | P2 |

==== 3rd place match ====
| Date | Time | | Score | | Set 1 | Set 2 | Set 3 | Set 4 | Set 5 | Total | Report |
|---|---|---|---|---|---|---|---|---|---|---|---|
| 13 Jul | 15:00 | Italy | 3–1 | Czech Republic | 22–25 | 25–22 | 25–22 | 25–19 | | 97–88 | P2 |

==== Final ====
| Date | Time | | Score | | Set 1 | Set 2 | Set 3 | Set 4 | Set 5 | Total | Report |
|---|---|---|---|---|---|---|---|---|---|---|---|
| 13 Jul | 18:00 | Serbia and Montenegro | 2–3 | Brazil | 16–25 | 25–21 | 25–19 | 23–25 | 29–31 | 118–121 | P2 |

== Final standing ==
| Rank | Team |
|---|---|
| 1st place, gold medalist(s) | Brazil |
| 2nd place, silver medalist(s) | Serbia and Montenegro |
| 3rd place, bronze medalist(s) | Italy |
| 4 | Czech Republic |
| 5 | Bulgaria |
| 5 | Spain |
| 7 | Greece |
| 7 | Russia |
| 9 | Poland |
| 10 | France |
| 10 | Germany |
| 10 | Netherlands |
| 13 | Cuba |
| 13 | Japan |
| 13 | Portugal |
| 13 | Venezuela |

2003 World League champions

Brazil
3rd title

12-man Roster for Final Round
Giovane, André Heller, Henrique, Maurício, Giba, André, Sérgio, Anderson, Nalbert, Rodrigão, Ricardo, Dante
Head coach
Bernardinho

== Awards ==
- Best scorer (most valuable player)
  (Serbia and Montenegro) Ivan Miljković
- Best spiker
  (Czech Republic) Martin Lebl
- Best blocker
  (Serbia and Montenegro) Andrija Gerić
- Best server
  (Serbia and Montenegro) Andrija Gerić
