= Volleyball at the 1996 Summer Olympics =

Volleyball at the Games of the XXVI Olympiad
- Venue: University of Georgia Coliseum (indoor); Omni Coliseum (indoor); Clayton County International Park (beach)
- Dates: July 20 – August 4, 1996
- No. of events: 4
- Competitors: 372 from 13 nations

Volleyball at the 1996 Summer Olympics featured Men's and Women's beach volleyball for the first time as an official Olympic sport. Men's and Women's indoor volleyball tournaments also took place.

== Medal table ==
Rank	Nation	Gold	Silver	Bronze	Total
1	Brazil	1	1	1	3
2	United States	1	1	0	2
3	Cuba	1	0	0	1
3	Netherlands	1	0	0	1
5	China	0	1	0	1
5	Italy	0	1	0	1
7	Australia	0	0	1	1
7	Canada	0	0	1	1
7	FR Yugoslavia	0	0	1	1
Totals (9 entries)		4	4	4	12

== Medal summary ==
Event	Gold	Silver	Bronze
Men's indoor	Netherlands; Peter Blangé; Guido Görtzen; Rob Grabert; Henk-Jan Held; Misha Latuhihin; Jan Posthuma; Brecht Rodenburg; Richard Schuil; Bas van de Goor; Mike van de Goor; Olof van der Meulen; Ron Zwerver	Italy; Lorenzo Bernardi; Vigor Bovolenta; Marco Bracci; Luca Cantagalli; Andrea Gardini; Andrea Giani; Pasquale Gravina; Marco Meoni; Samuele Papi; Andrea Sartoretti; Paolo Tofoli; Andrea Zorzi	FR Yugoslavia; Vladimir Batez; Dejan Brđović; Đorđe Đurić; Andrija Gerić; Nikola Grbić; Vladimir Grbić; Rajko Jokanović; Slobodan Kovač; Đula Mešter; Žarko Petrović; Željko Tanasković; Goran Vujević
Women's indoor	Cuba; Taimaris Aguero; Regla Bell; Magaly Carvajal; Marlenis Costa; Ana Fernández; Mirka Francia; Idalmis Gato; Lilia Izquierdo; Mireya Luis; Raisa O'Farrill; Yumilka Ruíz; Regla Torres	China; Cui Yong-Mei; He Qi; Lai Yawen; Li Yan; Liu Xiaoning; Pan Wenli; Sun Yue; Wang Lina; Wang Yi; Wang Ziling; Wu Yongmei; Zhu Yunying	Brazil; Ida Alvares; Leila Barros; Ericléia Bodziak; Hilma Caldeira; Ana Paula Connelly; Márcia Cunha; Virna Dias; Ana Moser; Ana Flávia Sanglard; Hélia Souza; Sandra Suruagy; Fernanda Venturini
Men's beach	Karch Kiraly and Kent Steffes; United States	Michael Dodd and Mike Whitmarsh; United States	John Child and Mark Heese; Canada
Women's beach	Jackie Silva and Sandra Pires; Brazil	Mônica Rodrigues and Adriana Samuel; Brazil	Natalie Cook and Kerri Pottharst; Australia
