= Misha Latuhihin =

Dutch volleyball player (born 1970)

Personal information
- Full name: Misha Jonas Emanuel Latuhihin
- Born: 26 December 1970 (age 55); Nijmegen, Gelderland, Netherlands

Volleyball information
- Position: Setter
- Number: 1

National team
1994–2000	Netherlands
Honours
Men's volleyball
Representing the Netherlands
Olympic Games
Gold medal – first place	1996 Atlanta	Team
World Championship
Silver medal – second place	1994 Greece	Team
FIVB World Cup
Silver medal – second place	1995 Japan
World League
Gold medal – first place	1996 Rotterdam
Bronze medal – third place	1998 Milan
World Grand Champions Cup
Silver medal – second place	1997 Japan
European Championship
Gold medal – first place	1997 Netherlands
Silver medal – second place	1995 Greece

Misha Jonas Emanuel Latuhihin (born 26 December 1970) is a retired volleyball player from the Netherlands, who represented his native country at the 1996 Summer Olympics in Atlanta, Georgia under the guidance of coach Joop Alberda. There he was the stand-in for Peter Blangé in the Dutch National Volleyball Team that won the gold medal by defeating rivals Italy in the final (3-2).
