= Richard Schuil =

Dutch beach volleyball player

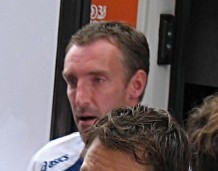

Personal information
- Born: 2 May 1973 (age 53); Leeuwarden, Friesland, Netherlands
- Height: 202 cm (6 ft 8 in)

Volleyball information
- Position: Opposite
- Number: 6

National team
1995–2004	Netherlands
Honours
Men's volleyball
Representing the Netherlands
Olympic Games
Gold medal – first place	1996 Atlanta	Indoor
FIVB World Cup
Silver medal – second place	1995 Japan
World League
Gold medal – first place	1996 Rotterdam
Bronze medal – third place	1998 Milan
World Grand Champions Cup
Silver medal – second place	1997 Japan
European Championships
Gold medal – first place	1997 Netherlands
Silver medal – second place	1995 Greece
Men's beach volleyball
European Beach Championships
Gold medal – first place	2008 Hamburg
Silver medal – second place	2007 Valencia

Richard Schuil (born 2 May 1973) is a former beach volleyball player from the Netherlands.

Schuil was born in Leeuwarden, Friesland. A former volleyball player, he represented his native country in three consecutive Summer Olympics in volleyball, starting in 1996 in Atlanta. There he won the gold medal with the Dutch Men's National Team by defeating archrivals Italy in the final (3–2).

== Beach volleyball ==
After the 2004 Summer Olympics, Schuil teamed with Reinder Nummerdor for a career in beach volleyball. The two won their first FIVB World Tour gold medal in 2007 at Valencia. To date they have won six gold medals. They have also appeared at two Olympic Games.

In his beach volleyball career, Schuil won 18 tournaments and $568,000 in prizes.

== Personal ==
Schuil married on 6 June 2009 the Dutch volleyball player Elke Wijnhoven. In March 2012, their daughter Lisa was born.

== Individual awards ==
- 2003 European Championship "Best Scorer"

Awards
Preceded by Harley Marques (BRA)	Men's FIVB Beach World Tour "Most Outstanding"; 2009	Succeeded by Phil Dalhausser (USA)
