= Guido Görtzen =

Dutch volleyball player (born 1970)

Personal information
- Born: 9 November 1970 (age 55); Heerlen, Netherlands
- Height: 202 cm (6 ft 8 in)

Volleyball information
- Position: Opposite
- Number: 5

National team
1994–2008	Netherlands
Honours
Men's volleyball
Representing the Netherlands
Olympic Games
Gold medal – first place	1996 Atlanta	Team
World Championship
Silver medal – second place	1994 Greece	Team
FIVB World Cup
Silver medal – second place	1995 Japan
World League
Gold medal – first place	1996 Rotterdam
Bronze medal – third place	1998 Milan
World Grand Champions Cup
Silver medal – second place	1997 Japan
European Championships
Gold medal – first place	1997 Netherlands
Silver medal – second place	1995 Greece

Guido Görtzen (born 9 November 1970) is a volleyball player from the Netherlands, who represented his native country in three consecutive Summer Olympics, starting in 1996 in Atlanta. There he won the gold medal with the Dutch Men's National Team by defeating archrivals Italy in the final (3–2).
