= Brecht Rodenburg =

Dutch volleyball player (born 1967)

Engelbrecht Rodenburg

Personal information
- Nickname: Brecht
- Born: 24 December 1967 (age 58); Nieuwerkerk aan den Ijssel, Netherlands

Volleyball information
- Position: Outside hitter
- Number: 4

National team
1993–1996	Netherlands
Honours
Men's volleyball
Representing the Netherlands
Olympic Games
Gold medal – first place	1996 Atlanta	Team
World Championship
Silver medal – second place	1994 Greece	Team
FIVB World Cup
Silver medal – second place	1995 Japan
World League
Gold medal – first place	1996 Rotterdam
European Championship
Silver medal – second place	1993 Finland
Silver medal – second place	1995 Greece

Engelbrecht "Brecht" Rodenburg (born 24 December 1967) is a retired volleyball player from the Netherlands, who represented his native country at the 1996 Summer Olympics in Atlanta. There he won the gold medal with the Dutch Men's National Team by defeating archrivals Italy in the final (3–2).
