= Henk-Jan Held =

Dutch volleyball player (born 1967)

Personal information
- Full name: Hendrik Jan Held
- Nickname: Henk-Jan Held
- Born: 12 November 1967 (age 58); Renswoude, Utrecht, Netherlands
- Height: 201 cm (6 ft 7 in)

Volleyball information
- Position: Middle blocker
- Number: 3

National team
1990–1997	Netherlands
Honours
Men's volleyball
Representing the Netherlands
Olympic Games
Gold medal – first place	1996 Atlanta	Team
Silver medal – second place	1992 Barcelona	Team
World Championship
Silver medal – second place	1994 Greece	Team
FIVB World Cup
Silver medal – second place	1995 Japan
World League
Gold medal – first place	1996 Rotterdam
Silver medal – second place	1990 Osaka
World Grand Champions Cup
Silver medal – second place	1997 Japan
European Championship
Gold medal – first place	1997 Netherlands
Silver medal – second place	1993 Finland
Silver medal – second place	1995 Greece
Bronze medal – third place	1991 Germany

Hendrik Jan ("Henk-Jan") Held (born 12 November 1967) is a retired volleyball player from the Netherlands who represented his native country at two consecutive Summer Olympics, starting in 1992 in Barcelona.

After having won the Olympic silver medal with the Dutch national team in 1992, Held's finest hour came in 1996, when his team won the gold medal in Atlanta by defeating Italy in the final (3–2). Held played professional volleyball in Italy for several years.
