= Bas van de Goor =

Dutch volleyball player

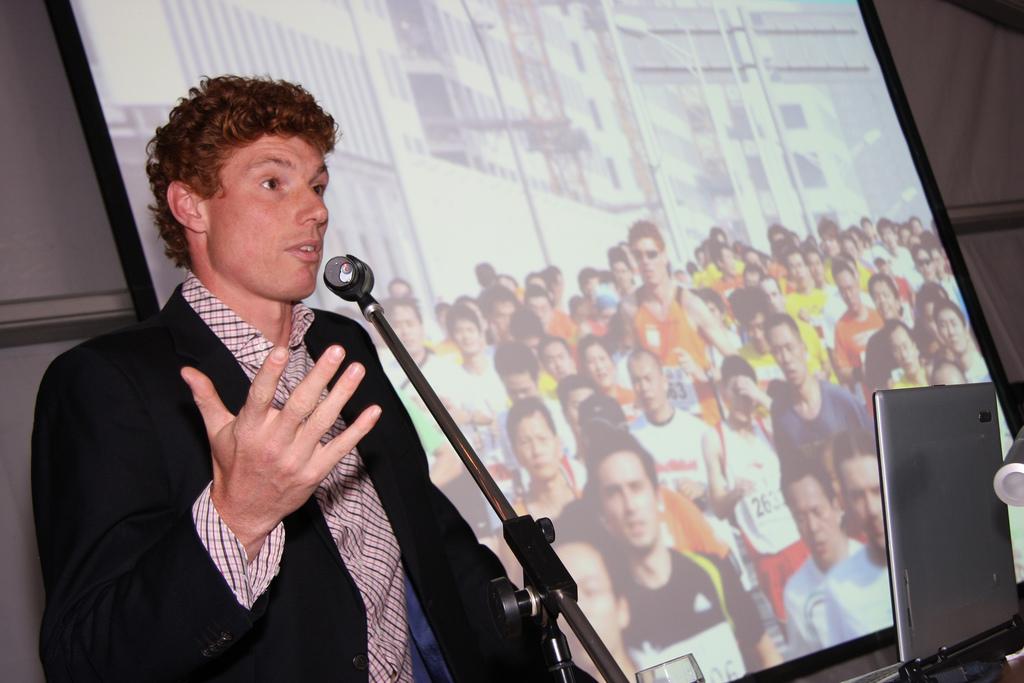
- Bas van de Goor

Personal information
- Full name: Sebastiaan Jacques Henri van de Goor
- Nickname: Bas
- Born: 4 September 1971 (age 55); Oss, Netherlands
- Height: 209 cm (6 ft 10 in)

Volleyball information
- Position: Middle blocker
- Number: 9 (national team); 14 (Sisley Treviso)

National team
1993–2001	Netherlands
Honours
Men's volleyball
Representing the Netherlands
Olympic Games
Gold medal – first place	1996 Atlanta	Team
World Championship
Silver medal – second place	1994 Greece	Team
FIVB World Cup
Silver medal – second place	1995 Japan
World League
Gold medal – first place	1996 Rotterdam
Bronze medal – third place	1998 Milan
World Grand Champions Cup
Silver medal – second place	1997 Japan
European Championship
Gold medal – first place	1997 Netherlands
Silver medal – second place	1993 Finland
Silver medal – second place	1995 Greece

Sebastiaan Jacques Henri "Bas" van de Goor (born 4 September 1971) is a retired volleyball player from the Netherlands who represented his native country at two consecutive Summer Olympics, starting in 1996 in Atlanta. Van de Goor was elected twice as the most valuable player of the Olympics (1996 and 2000). He was a middle blocker.

At van de Goor's Olympic debut, he won the gold medal, alongside his younger brother and three-time Olympian, Mike, by defeating arch rivals Italy (3–2) in the final. Four years later, he ended up in fifth place at the 2000 Summer Olympics in Sydney.

While representing the Netherlands, van de Goor won a silver medal at the 1994 FIVB World Championship in Greece. He also won silver medals at the 1993, and 1995 European Championship, and a gold medal at the 1997 European Championship.

Van de Goor's national volleyball coach Joop Alberda referred to him as the "Michael Jordan of volleyball". In 2018, van de Goor was inducted into the International Volleyball Hall of Fame.

== Personal life ==
In 2003, van de Goor was diagnosed with type 1 diabetes. He has founded the Bas van de Goor Foundation, aimed at "improving the quality of life for people with diabetes through sports".
