= Mike van de Goor =

Dutch volleyball player

Personal information
- Full name: Mike Willem Frank van de Goor
- Born: 14 May 1973 (age 53); Oss, Netherlands
- Height: 207 cm (6 ft 9 in)

Volleyball information
- Position: Opposite
- Number: 7

National team
1994–2007	Netherlands
Honours
Men's volleyball
Representing the Netherlands
Olympic Games
Gold medal – first place	1996 Atlanta	Team
World League
Gold medal – first place	1996 Rotterdam
Bronze medal – third place	1998 Milan
World Grand Champions Cup
Silver medal – second place	1997 Japan
European Championships
Gold medal – first place	1997 Netherlands

Mike Willem Frank van de Goor (born 14 May 1973) is a retired volleyball player from the Netherlands who represented his native country at three consecutive Summer Olympics, starting in 1996. As a reserve player, he won the gold medal at his Olympic debut, alongside his older brother and two-time Olympian Bas.

Four years later, van de Goor finished in fifth place with the Dutch national team at the Olympics in Sydney. In 2004, he finished in ninth place at the Olympics in Athens.
