= Julio Velasco =

Argentine volleyball coach (born 1952)

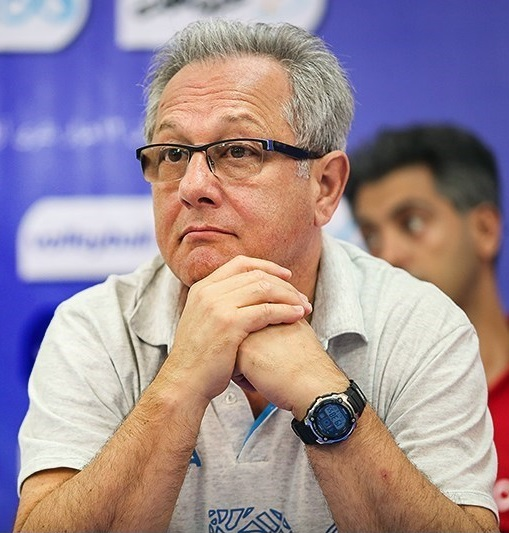
- Velasco in 2016

Personal information
- Nationality: Argentine / Italian
- Born: 9 February 1952 (age 74) La Plata, Argentina

Coaching information
- Current team: Italy Women
- Previous teams coached
- Years: Teams
- 1979–1982 1981–1983 1983–1985 1985–1989 1989–1996 1996–1997 2001–2002 2002–2004 2004–2006 2006–2008 2008–2010 2011–2014 2014–2018 2018–2019 2023 2024–: Ferro Carril Oeste (W); Argentina (AC); Tre Valli Jesi; Modena Volley; Italy; Italy (W); Czech Republic; Copra Piacenza; Modena Volley; Gabeca Montichiari; Spain; Iran; Argentina; Modena Volley; UYBA Volley; Italy (W)
Honours
Women's volleyball
Head coach Italy
Olympic Games
Gold medal – first place	2024 Paris
FIVB World Championship
Gold medal – first place	2025 Thailand
Mediterranean Games
Gold medal – first place	1997 Italy
FIVB Nations League
Gold medal – first place	2024 Bangkok	Team
Gold medal – first place	2025 Łódź	Team
Men's volleyball
Head coach Italy
Olympic Games
Silver medal – second place	1996 Atlanta
FIVB World Championship
Gold medal – first place	1990 Brazil
Gold medal – first place	1994 Greece
FIVB World Cup
Gold medal – first place	1995 Japan
FIVB World Grand Champions Cup
Gold medal – first place	1993 Japan
FIVB World League
Gold medal – first place	1990 Osaka
Gold medal – first place	1991 Milan
Gold medal – first place	1992 Genoa
Gold medal – first place	1994 Milan
Gold medal – first place	1995 Rio de Janeiro
Silver medal – second place	1996 Rotterdam
Bronze medal – third place	1993 São Paulo
CEV European Championship
Gold medal – first place	1989 Sweden
Gold medal – first place	1993 Finland
Gold medal – first place	1995 Greece
Silver medal – second place	1991 Germany
Head coach Spain
Mediterranean Games
Silver medal – second place	2009 Italy
CEV European League
Silver medal – second place	2009 Portugal
Silver medal – second place	2010 Spain
Head coach Iran
AVC Asian Championship
Gold medal – first place	2011 Iran
Gold medal – first place	2013 UAE
Head coach Argentina
Pan American Games
Gold medal – first place	2015 Canada

Julio Velasco (born 9 February 1952) is an Argentine-Italian volleyball coach and former professional player who is the head coach of the Italy women's national volleyball team, which he led to victory at the 2024 Paris Olympics and the 2025 World Championship.

During his career, Velasco has coached several national teams to podium finishes. He has won two Olympic medals (one gold and one silver), three World Championships (becoming the first – and so far only – coach to win both the men's and the women's titles), three European Championships, two Asian Championships, three Mediterranean Games medals (two gold and one silver), and a gold medal at the Pan American Games. He has also claimed eleven additional international titles.

In club competitions, Velasco has won four Argentine championships, four Italian championships, three Italian Cups, one Italian Super Cup, and one CEV Cup Winners' Cup. In 2005, he was inducted into the International Volleyball Hall of Fame.

== Career ==
=== Player ===
Velasco began playing volleyball at the age of 15 for the National University of La Plata Club.

=== Coach ===
Velasco became an assistant coach of the Argentina men's national volleyball team from 1981 to 1983. In 1983, he was invited to coach Tre Valli Jesi in Italy, where he remained until 1985. He then coached Panini Modena from 1985 to 1989, leading them to four consecutive Italian national championships from 1986 to 1989. In 1989, he was appointed head coach of the Italy men's national volleyball team, leading them to unprecedented success. His first trophy with the Italian side came at the 1989 Men's European Volleyball Championship in Sweden, where they topped their preliminary group with only one loss, advanced through the knockout stage, and defeated the host nation Sweden 3–1 in the final to win their first official international title.

It was in 1990 that Velasco helped Italy reach the pinnacle of world volleyball, guiding them to victory at the 1990 FIVB Volleyball Men's World Championship in Brazil. In the knockout stage, Italy defeated Argentina 3–0 in the quarter-finals, hosts Brazil 3–2 in the semi-finals, and Cuba 3–1 in the final to claim their first world title. During his tenure as Italy’s coach, Velasco won two additional European Championships, another World Championship, and five FIVB Volleyball World League titles. He also secured several other honours, including the FIVB World Grand Champions Cup, Mediterranean Games, FIVB World Cup, and the World Super Challenge. Under his leadership, the Italian men's team also won their first Olympic silver medal at the 1996 Summer Olympics, a historic moment for the Italian Volleyball Federation (FIPAV).

After the 1996 Olympics, Velasco transitioned to coaching the Italy women's national volleyball team from 1996 to 1997, leading them to a gold medal at the 1997 Mediterranean Games. He coached the Czech Republic men's national volleyball team in 2001 and returned to Italy to coach Copra Piacenza in 2002. In 2008, he became head coach of the Spain men's national volleyball team, which he led to two finals in the European Volleyball League and to a final at the Mediterranean Games. In 2011, Velasco was appointed head coach of the Iran men's national volleyball team. He left before his contract expired on 1 March 2014, after winning two Asian Championships, following a request from then-President of Argentina, Cristina Fernández de Kirchner, to return home. His contract termination was approved by the Iranian Volleyball Federation.

Velasco subsequently led the Argentina men's team to a gold medal at the 2015 Pan American Games. After the experience with the national team of his home country, Velasco was appointed head coach of Modena Volley for the 2018–2019 season. In 2024, he was formally appointed head coach of the Italy women's national volleyball team. Since his arrival, the Italian national team has won the gold medal at the 2024 Summer Olympics, the 2025 World Championship, and two Nations League titles.

=== Administrator ===
During the 1998–99 season, Velasco was General Director of UEFA Cup Winner's Cup winner S.S. Lazio, and in 2000, he moved to Massimo Moratti's Inter Milan.

== Honours ==
Ferro

- Primera División: 1979, 1980, 1981, 1982

Modena

- Serie A1: 1986, 1987, 1988, 1989
- Coppa Italia: 1986, 1988, 1989
- Italian Super Cup: 2018
- CEV Cup Winners's Cup: 1986

Italy men's national team

- Olympic Silver Medal: 1996
- FIVB World Championship: 1990, 1994
- European Volleyball Championship: 1989, 1993, 1995
  - runner-up: 1991
- FIVB World League: 1990, 1991, 1992, 1994, 1995
  - runner-up: 1996
  - 3rd place: 1993
- FIVB World Cup: 1995
- FIVB World Grand Champions Cup: 1993
- World Top Four FIVB: 1994
- World Super Six FIVB: 1996
- Mediterranean Games Gold Medal: 1991

Italy women's national team

- Olympic Gold Medal: 2024
- FIVB World Championship: 2025
- FIVB Women's Volleyball Nations League: 2024, 2025
- Mediterranean Games Gold Medal: 1997

Spain men's national team

- Mediterranean Games Silver Medal: 2009
- Men's European Volleyball League runner-up: 2009, 2010

Iran men's national team

- Asian Men's Volleyball Championship: 2011, 2013

Argentina men's national team

- Pan American Games Gold Medal: 2015

== Individual awards ==
- 1990 FIVB World Championship – Best Coach
- 1991 Medal of Merit Sport Organization Italy
- 1993 FIVB World Grand Champions Cup – Best Coach
- 1995 FIVB World Cup – Best Coach
- 2000 Konex Award – Technical Director
- 2012 Società Italiana Medici Manager – Technical Award
- 2014 Coach of the Year in Iran
- 2022 CEV – Lifetime Achievement Award

=== Orders ===
- CONI: Golden Palm of Technical Merit: Palma d'oro al Merito Tecnico: 2018
- President of Italy: Grand Cross of the Order of Merit of the Italian Republic: 2019

== About him ==
Velasco was a philosophy student and a Maoist militant during his university days, which led to his expulsion by the board of the National University of La Plata in 1974. After the 1976 Argentine coup d'état, he was forced to live in semi-clandestinity due to his previous political involvement — a situation that compelled him to move to Buenos Aires, where he secured his first volleyball coaching job. He discussed coaching with football mastermind Pep Guardiola on multiple occasions. While Velasco was living in Italy, Guardiola once travelled hundreds of kilometres to meet the Argentine volleyball coach in person, simply because he had seen him in a television interview and wanted to learn from him.
