= Olof van der Meulen =

Dutch volleyball player

Personal information
- Full name: Roelof Antonius van der Meulen
- Nickname: Olof
- Born: 8 November 1968 (age 57); Sneek, Friesland, Netherlands
- Height: 202 cm (6 ft 8 in)

Volleyball information
- Position: Outside hitter
- Number: 11

National team
1991–1997	Netherlands
Honours
Men's volleyball
Representing the Netherlands
Olympic Games
Gold medal – first place	1996 Atlanta	Team
Silver medal – second place	1992 Barcelona	Team
World Championship
Silver medal – second place	1994 Greece	Team
FIVB World Cup
Silver medal – second place	1995 Japan
World Grand Champions Cup
Silver medal – second place	1997 Japan
European Championship
Gold medal – first place	1997 Netherlands
Silver medal – second place	1993 Finland
Silver medal – second place	1995 Greece
Bronze medal – third place	1991 Germany

Roelof ("Olof") Antonius van der Meulen (born 8 November 1968) is a retired volleyball player from the Netherlands, who represented his native country in two consecutive Summer Olympics, starting in 1992 in Barcelona.

After having won the silver medal in 1992, Van der Meulen's finest hour came in 1996, when he won the gold medal in Atlanta with the Dutch team by defeating Italy in the final (3–2).
