= Jan Posthuma =

Dutch volleyball player (born 1963)

Personal information
- Full name: Jan Marcus Posthuma
- Born: 11 June 1963 (age 63); Dokkum, Friesland, Netherlands
- Height: 209 cm (6 ft 10 in)

Volleyball information
- Position: Middle blocker
- Number: 6 (1988); 13 (1992); 10 (1996)

National team
1987–1996	Netherlands
Honours
Men's volleyball
Representing the Netherlands
Olympic Games
Gold medal – first place	1996 Atlanta	Team
Silver medal – second place	1992 Barcelona	Team
World Championship
Silver medal – second place	1994 Greece	Team
FIVB World Cup
Silver medal – second place	1995 Japan
World League
Gold medal – first place	1996 Rotterdam
European Championship
Silver medal – second place	1993 Finland
Bronze medal – third place	1989 Sweden
Bronze medal – third place	1991 Germany

Jan Marcus Posthuma (born 11 June 1963) is a retired volleyball player from the Netherlands, who represented his native country at three consecutive Summer Olympics, starting in 1988 in Seoul.

After having won the silver medal with the Dutch national team in 1992, Posthuma's team won the gold medal in Atlanta (1996) by defeating Italy in the final (3–2).

== Individual awards ==
- 1992 FIVB World League "Best Digger"
