= Rob Grabert =

Dutch volleyball player (born 1964)

Personal information
- Full name: Robert Karl Baldwin Grabert
- Born: 5 February 1964 (age 62); Hückelhoven, North Rhine-Westphalia, Germany
- Height: 198 cm (6 ft 6 in)

Volleyball information
- Position: Outside hitter
- Number: 15 (1988); 13 (1996)

National team
1987–1996	Netherlands
Honours
Men's volleyball
Representing the Netherlands
Olympic Games
Gold medal – first place	1996 Atlanta	Team
World Championship
Silver medal – second place	1994 Greece	Team
World League
Gold medal – first place	1996 Rotterdam
Silver medal – second place	1990 Osaka
European Championship
Silver medal – second place	1993 Finland
Bronze medal – third place	1989 Sweden

Robert "Rob" Karl Baldwin Grabert (born 5 February 1964) is a retired volleyball player from the Netherlands who represented his home country at the 1988 and 1996 Summer Olympics. His finest hour came in 1996, when he won the gold medal in Atlanta with the Dutch men's national team by defeating archrivals Italy in the final (3–2).
