= Grabert =

Grabert is a surname. Notable people with the surname include:

- Rob Grabert (born 1964), Dutch volleyball player.
- Siegfried Grabert (1916–1942), recipient of the Knight's Cross of the Iron Cross of Nazi Germany.

== See also ==
- Grabert Verlag, German publishing company
