= Peter Blangé =

Dutch volleyball player (born 1964)

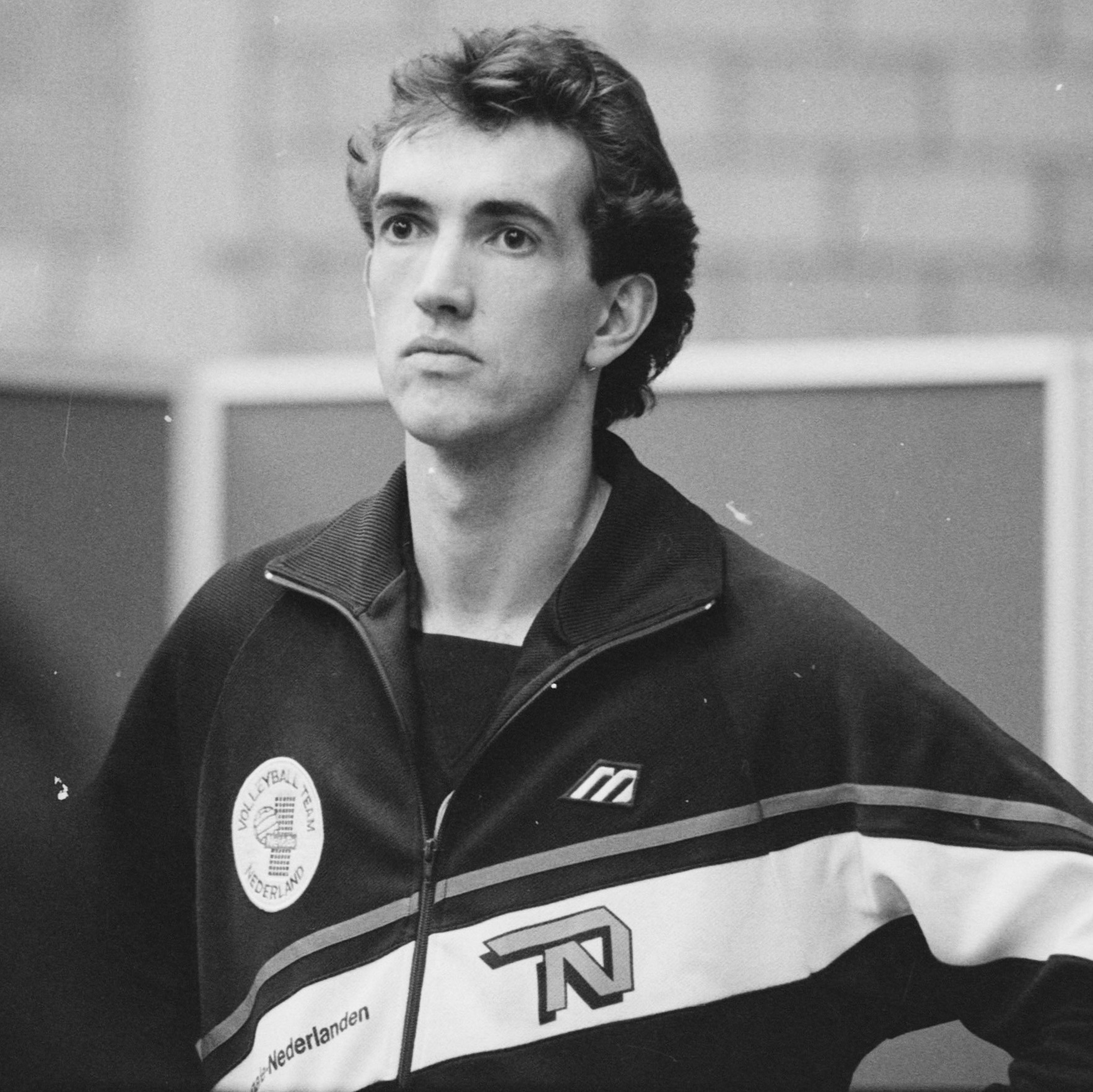
- Blangé in 1992

Personal information
- Born: 9 December 1964 (age 61); Voorburg, South Holland, Netherlands
- Height: 205 cm (6 ft 9 in)

Volleyball information
- Position: Setter
- Number: 12

National team
1984–1999	Netherlands
Honours
Men's volleyball
Representing Netherlands
Olympic Games
Gold medal – first place	1996 Atlanta	Team
Silver medal – second place	1992 Barcelona	Team
World Championship
Silver medal – second place	1994 Greece	Team
World Cup
Silver medal – second place	1995 Japan
World League
Gold medal – first place	1996 Rotterdam
Silver medal – second place	1990 Osaka
Bronze medal – third place	1998 Milan
European Championship
Gold medal – first place	1997 Netherlands
Silver medal – second place	1993 Finland
Silver medal – second place	1995 Greece
Bronze medal – third place	1989 Sweden
Bronze medal – third place	1991 Germany

Peter Blangé (born 9 December 1964) is a retired volleyball player and coach from the Netherlands who represented his native country in four consecutive Summer Olympics, starting in 1988 in Seoul. Four years later, he helped the Dutch national team win the silver medal in the 1992 Olympics in Barcelona. Blangé then won the gold medal with the national team in the 1996 Olympics in Atlanta by defeating Italy in the final. His final Olympic appearance as an athlete was in the 2000 Olympics in Sydney, where he played his 500th game with the Dutch team. He was a setter.

In 2012, Blangé was inducted into the International Volleyball Hall of Fame.

== Coaching ==
Blangé was the head coach of the Dutch men's national volleyball team from 2006 to 2011.

== Awards ==
- Olympic silver medal 1992
- Olympic gold medal 1996
- World League gold medal 1996
- European Championship gold medal 1997
- International Volleyball Hall of Fame 2012
