= Volleyball at the 1996 Summer Olympics – Men's tournament =

Men's volleyball at the Games of the XXVI Olympiad
- Venue: Omni Coliseum and Stegeman Coliseum
- Date: 21 July – 4 August
- Competitors: 144 from 12 nations

Medalists
| 1st place, gold medalist(s) | | Netherlands (1st title) |
| 2nd place, silver medalist(s) | | Italy |
| 3rd place, bronze medalist(s) | | Yugoslavia |

The men's tournament in volleyball at the 1996 Summer Olympics was the 9th edition of the event at the Summer Olympics, organized by the world's governing body, the FIVB in conjunction with the IOC. It was held in Atlanta and Athens, Georgia, United States from 21 July to 4 August 1996.

== Qualification ==
| Means of qualification | Date | Host | Vacancies | Qualified |
|---|---|---|---|---|
| Host country | 18 September 1990 | (Japan) Tokyo | 1 | United States |
| 1995 World Cup | 18 November – 2 December 1995 | Japan | 3 | Italy |
| 1995 World Cup | 18 November – 2 December 1995 | Japan | 3 | Netherlands |
| 1995 World Cup | 18 November – 2 December 1995 | Japan | 3 | Brazil |
| African Qualifier | 29–31 March 1996 | (Morocco) Rabat | 1 | Tunisia |
| Asian Qualifier | 12–21 April 1996 | (South Korea) Seoul & (Japan) Tokyo | 1 | South Korea |
| European Qualifier | 27–29 March 1996 | (Denmark) Copenhagen | 1 | Russia |
| North American Qualifier | 14–16 April 1996 | (Canada) Calgary | 1 | Cuba |
| South American Qualifier | 12–14 April 1996 | (Argentina) Buenos Aires | 1 | Argentina |
| 1st World Qualifier | 3–5 May 1996 | (Portugal) Espinho | 1 | Bulgaria |
| 2nd World Qualifier | 3–5 May 1996 | (Germany) Munich | 1 | Yugoslavia |
| 3rd World Qualifier | 3–5 May 1996 | (Greece) Patras | 1 | Poland |
| Total | | | 12 | |

== Pools composition ==
| Pool A | Pool B |
|---|---|
| United States (Hosts) | Italy |
| Brazil | Netherlands |
| Cuba | Russia |
| Argentina | South Korea |
| Bulgaria | Tunisia |
| Poland | Yugoslavia |

== Venues ==
| Main venue | Sub venue |
|---|---|
| Atlanta, United States | Athens, United States |
| Omni Coliseum | Stegeman Coliseum |
| Capacity: 16,378 | Capacity: 10,523 |

== Preliminary round ==
- The top four teams in each pool qualified for the quarterfinals.

=== Pool A ===
| Pos | Team | Pld | W | L | Pts | SW | SL | SR | SPW | SPL | SPR | Qualification |
|---|---|---|---|---|---|---|---|---|---|---|---|---|
| 1 | Cuba | 5 | 4 | 1 | 9 | 12 | 5 | 2.400 | 233 | 191 | 1.220 | Quarterfinals |
| 2 | Brazil | 5 | 3 | 2 | 8 | 10 | 6 | 1.667 | 210 | 187 | 1.123 | Quarterfinals |
| 3 | Bulgaria | 5 | 3 | 2 | 8 | 10 | 8 | 1.250 | 225 | 212 | 1.061 | Quarterfinals |
| 4 | Argentina | 5 | 3 | 2 | 8 | 9 | 9 | 1.000 | 222 | 225 | 0.987 | Quarterfinals |
| 5 | United States | 5 | 2 | 3 | 7 | 10 | 9 | 1.111 | 241 | 233 | 1.034 | |
| 6 | Poland | 5 | 0 | 5 | 5 | 1 | 15 | 0.067 | 151 | 234 | 0.645 | |

| 21 July 1996 | Cuba | 3–0 | Bulgaria |
| 21 July 1996 | (15–9, 15–7, 15–7) |

| 21 July 1996 | United States | 3–0 | Poland |
| 21 July 1996 | (15–13, 15–6, 15–8) |

| 21 July 1996 | Argentina | 3–1 | Brazil |
| 21 July 1996 | (9–15, 15–8, 16–14, 15–6) |

| 23 July 1996 | Bulgaria | 3–0 | Brazil |
| 23 July 1996 | (15–11, 15–13, 15–8) |

| 23 July 1996 | United States | 3–0 | Argentina |
| 23 July 1996 | (15–7, 15–8, 15–11) |

| 23 July 1996 | Cuba | 3–0 | Poland |
| 23 July 1996 | (15–13, 15–2, 15–13) |

| 25 July 1996 | Argentina | 3–1 | Bulgaria |
| 25 July 1996 | (15–10, 15–8, 11–15, 15–10) |

| 25 July 1996 | Brazil | 3–0 | Poland |
| 25 July 1996 | (15–7, 15–11, 15–8) |

| 25 July 1996 | Cuba | 3–2 | United States |
| 25 July 1996 | (4–15, 15–9, 14–16, 15–8, 18–16) |

| 27 July 1996 | Cuba | 3–0 | Argentina |
| 27 July 1996 | (15–10, 15–12, 15–9) |

| 27 July 1996 | Bulgaria | 3–0 | Poland |
| 27 July 1996 | (15–4, 15–10, 15–7) |

| 27 July 1996 | Brazil | 3–0 | United States |
| 27 July 1996 | (15–11, 15–11, 15–7) |

| 29 July 1996 | Argentina | 3–1 | Poland |
| 29 July 1996 | (7–15, 17–15, 15–10, 15–9) |

| 29 July 1996 | Bulgaria | 3–2 | United States |
| 29 July 1996 | (15–11, 13–15, 11–15, 15–5, 15–12) |

| 29 July 1996 | Brazil | 3–0 | Cuba |
| 29 July 1996 | (15–11, 15–10, 15–11) |

=== Pool B ===
| Pos | Team | Pld | W | L | Pts | SW | SL | SR | SPW | SPL | SPR | Qualification |
|---|---|---|---|---|---|---|---|---|---|---|---|---|
| 1 | Italy | 5 | 5 | 0 | 10 | 15 | 0 | MAX | 225 | 138 | 1.630 | Quarterfinals |
| 2 | Netherlands | 5 | 4 | 1 | 9 | 12 | 3 | 4.000 | 209 | 131 | 1.595 | Quarterfinals |
| 3 | FR Yugoslavia | 5 | 3 | 2 | 8 | 9 | 8 | 1.125 | 215 | 191 | 1.126 | Quarterfinals |
| 4 | Russia | 5 | 2 | 3 | 7 | 7 | 9 | 0.778 | 196 | 201 | 0.975 | Quarterfinals |
| 5 | South Korea | 5 | 1 | 4 | 6 | 3 | 12 | 0.250 | 156 | 198 | 0.788 | |
| 6 | Tunisia | 5 | 0 | 5 | 5 | 1 | 15 | 0.067 | 98 | 240 | 0.408 | |

| 21 July 1996 | Netherlands | 3–0 | Tunisia |
| 21 July 1996 | (15–4, 15–4, 15–2) |

| 21 July 1996 | Italy | 3–0 | South Korea |
| 21 July 1996 | (15–13, 15–12, 15–8} |

| 21 July 1996 | FR Yugoslavia | 3–1 | Russia |
| 21 July 1996 | (10–15, 15–13, 15–10, 15–11) |

| 23 July 1996 | Netherlands | 3–0 | Russia |
| 23 July 1996 | (15–9, 15–9, 15–9) |

| 23 July 1996 | Italy | 3–0 | Tunisia |
| 23 July 1996 | (15–9, 15–5, 15–1) |

| 23 July 1996 | FR Yugoslavia | 3–0 | South Korea |
| 23 July 1996 | (15–5, 15–6, 16–14) |

| 25 July 1996 | Italy | 3–0 | Netherlands |
| 25 July 1996 | (15–8, 15–8, 15–13) |

| 25 July 1996 | FR Yugoslavia | 3–1 | Tunisia |
| 25 July 1996 | (15–4, 15–17, 15–3, 15–3) |

| 25 July 1996 | Russia | 3–0 | South Korea |
| 25 July 1996 | (15–8, 15–4, 16–14) |

| 27 July 1996 | Italy | 3–0 | Russia |
| 27 July 1996 | (15–11, 15–6, 15–12) |

| 27 July 1996 | Netherlands | 3–0 | FR Yugoslavia |
| 27 July 1996 | (15–7, 15–6, 15–9) |

| 27 July 1996 | South Korea | 3–0 | Tunisia |
| 27 July 1996 | (15–4, 15–6, 15–6) |

| 29 July 1996 | Italy | 3–0 | FR Yugoslavia |
| 29 July 1996 | (15–12, 15–8, 15–12) |

| 29 July 1996 | Russia | 3–0 | Tunisia |
| 29 July 1996 | (15–9, 15–10, 15–11) |

| 29 July 1996 | Netherlands | 3–0 | South Korea |
| 29 July 1996 | (15–4, 15–11, 15–12) |

== Final round ==
Quarterfinals
31 July
Cuba | 0
Russia | 3
31 July
Bulgaria | 1
Netherlands | 3
31 July
Brazil | 2
Yugoslavia | 3
31 July
Argentina | 1
Italy | 3

Semifinals
2 August
Russia | 0
Netherlands | 3
2 August
Yugoslavia | 1
Italy | 3

Gold medal match
4 August
Netherlands | 3
Italy | 2
Bronze medal match
4 August
Russia | 1
Yugoslavia | 3

5th–8th semifinals
1 August
Cuba | 3
Bulgaria | 1
1 August
Brazil | 3
Argentina | 1

5th place match
2 August
Cuba | 0
Brazil | 3
7th place match
2 August
Bulgaria | 3
Argentina | 2

=== Quarterfinals ===
| 31 July 1996 | Cuba | 0–3 | Russia |
| 31 July 1996 | (13–15, 15–17, 11–15} |

| 31 July 1996 | Bulgaria | 1–3 | Netherlands |
| 31 July 1996 | (14–16, 15–9, 3–15 ,13–15) |

| 31 July 1996 | Brazil | 2–3 | FR Yugoslavia |
| 31 July 1996 | (6–15, 5–15 ,15–8 ,16–14, 10–15) |

| 31 July 1996 | Argentina | 1–3 | Italy |
| 31 July 1996 | (15–12, 9–15, 7–15, 4–15) |

=== 5th–8th semifinals ===
| 1 August 1996 | Cuba | 3–1 | Bulgaria |
| 1 August 1996 | (15–4, 15–12, 16–17 ,15–12) |

| 1 August 1996 | Brazil | 3–1 | Argentina |
| 1 August 1996 | (15–10, 15–3, 13–15 ,15–9) |

=== Semifinals ===
| 2 August 1996 | Russia | 0–3 | Netherlands |
| 2 August 1996 | (6–15, 6–15, 10–15) |

| 2 August 1996 | FR Yugoslavia | 1–3 | Italy |
| 2 August 1996 | (12–15, 15–8, 6–15, 7–15) |

=== 7th place match ===
| 2 August 1996 | Bulgaria | 3–2 | Argentina |
| 2 August 1996 | (15–10, 15–10, 7–15, 7–15, 20–18) |

=== 5th place match ===
| 2 August 1996 | Cuba | 0–3 | Brazil |
| 2 August 1996 | (12–15, 14–16, 14–16) |

=== Bronze medal match ===
| 4 August 1996 | Russia | 1–3 | FR Yugoslavia |
| 4 August 1996 | (8–15, 15–7, 8–15 ,9–15) |

=== Gold medal match ===
| 4 August 1996 | Netherlands | 3–2 | Italy |
| 4 August 1996 | (15–12, 9–15, 16–14, 9–15, 17–15) |

== Final standing ==
| Rank | Team |
|---|---|
| 1st place, gold medalist(s) | Netherlands |
| 2nd place, silver medalist(s) | Italy |
| 3rd place, bronze medalist(s) | FR Yugoslavia |
| 4 | Russia |
| 5 | Brazil |
| 6 | Cuba |
| 7 | Bulgaria |
| 8 | Argentina |
| 9 | South Korea |
| 9 | United States |
| 11 | Poland |
| 11 | Tunisia |

1996 Men's Olympic champions

Netherlands
1st title

12–man roster
Misha Latuhihin, Henk-Jan Held, Brecht Rodenburg, Guido Görtzen, Richard Schuil, Ron Zwerver, B. van de Goor, Jan Posthuma, Olof van der Meulen, Peter Blangé, Rob Grabert, M. van de Goor
Head coach
Joop Alberda

== Medalists ==
| Gold | Silver | Bronze |
|---|---|---|
| Netherlands Misha Latuhihin; Henk-Jan Held; Brecht Rodenburg; Guido Görtzen; Richard Schuil; Ron Zwerver; Bas van de Goor; Jan Posthuma; Olof van der Meulen; Peter Blangé; Rob Grabert; Mike van de Goor Head coach: Joop Alberda | Italy Andrea Gardini; Marco Meoni; Pasquale Gravina; Paolo Tofoli; Samuele Papi; Andrea Sartoretti; Marco Bracci; Lorenzo Bernardi; Luca Cantagalli; Andrea Zorzi; Andrea Giani; Vigor Bovolenta Head coach: Julio Velasco | FR Yugoslavia Đorđe Đurić; Žarko Petrović; Vladimir Batez; Željko Tanasković; Dejan Brđović; Đula Mešter; Slobodan Kovač; Nikola Grbić; Vladimir Grbić; Rajko Jokanović; Goran Vujević; Andrija Gerić Head coach: Zoran Gajić |

== Awards ==
- Most valuable player

(Netherlands) Bas van de Goor

- Best spiker

(Netherlands) Bas van de Goor

- Best server

(Argentina) Marcos Milinkovic

- Best blocker

(Bulgaria) Nikolay Jeliazkov

- Best setter

(Netherlands) Peter Blangé

== See also ==
- Women's Olympic Tournament
