= Lorenzo Bernardi =

Italian volleyball player and coach

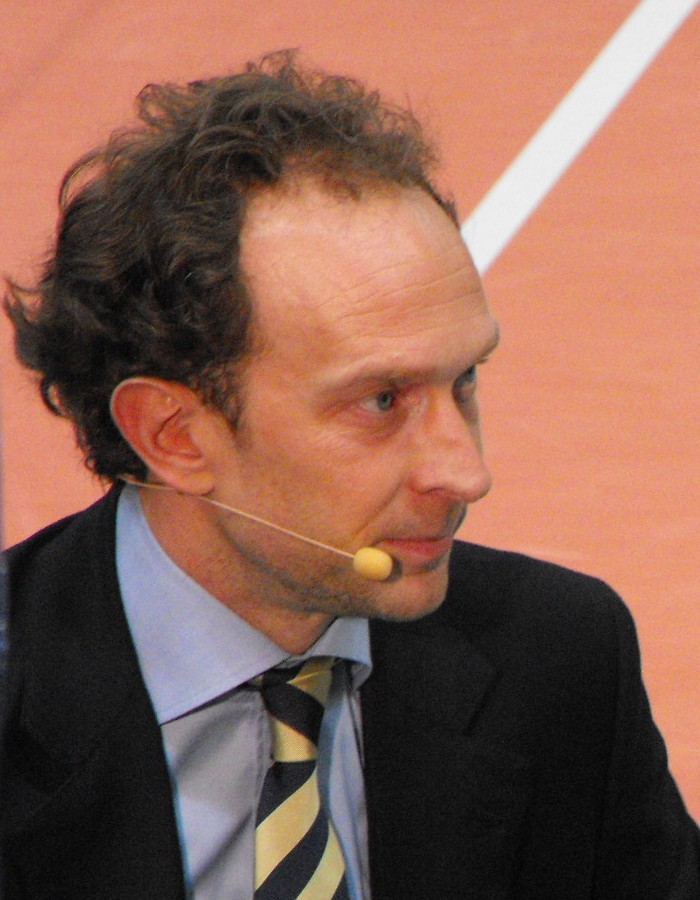

Personal information
- Born: 11 August 1968 (age 58) Trento, Italy
- Height: 1.99 m (6 ft 6 in)

Coaching information
- Previous teams coached
- Years: Teams
- 2007–2009 2009–2010 2010–2014 2014–2016 2016–2019 2020–2022: Anaune Pallavolo; Pallavolo Padova; Jastrzębski Węgiel; Halkbank Ankara; Sir Safety Perugia; Gas Sales Piacenza

Volleyball information
- Position: Outside hitter

Career
- Years: Team
- 1984–1985 1985–1990 1990–2002 2002–2004 2004 2004–2005 2005–2006 2006–2007 2007: Pallavolo Padova; Modena Volley; Volley Treviso; Trentino Volley; Al Rayyan; Volley Lube; Olympiacos Piraeus; Verona Volley; Gabeca Pallavolo

National team
- Years: Team
- 1987–2001: Italy (306)
Honours
Men's volleyball
Representing Italy
Olympic Games
Silver medal – second place	1996 Atlanta
FIVB World Championship
Gold medal – first place	1990 Brazil
Gold medal – first place	1994 Greece
FIVB World Cup
Gold medal – first place	1995 Japan
FIVB World League
Gold medal – first place	1990 Osaka
Gold medal – first place	1991 Milan
Gold medal – first place	1992 Genoa
Gold medal – first place	1994 Milan
Gold medal – first place	2000 Rotterdam
Goodwill Games
Gold medal – first place	1990 Seattle
CEV European Championship
Gold medal – first place	1989 Sweden
Gold medal – first place	1995 Greece
Silver medal – second place	1991 Germany
Silver medal – second place	2001 Czech Republic
Head coach Italy
Mediterranean Games
Gold medal – first place	2009 Pescara

Lorenzo Bernardi (born 11 August 1968) is an Italian professional volleyball coach and former player, a silver medallist at the Olympic Games Atlanta 1996, two–time World Champion (1990, 1994), and a two–time European Champion (1989, 1995).

Bernardi was elected the best player of the 1994 World Championship and 1995 European Championship, and in 2001, the FIVB declared him to be the "Volleyball Player of the Century" with Karch Kiraly.

== Career ==
Born in Trento, Bernardi started his long career in the 1980s as setter, but later was switched to hitter and passer. From 1985 he played with the Panini Modena club. Bernardi won the Italian championship nine times with Modena and with Sisley Treviso, which he played for from 1990 to 2001.

His first cap with Italy national volleyball team was on 27 May 1987, he played for a total of 306 times in "Azzurri" colours, winning two European gold medals in (1989 and 1995), two World Championships (1990 and 1994), three Volleyball World Leagues and the Volleyball World Cup in 1995. His international tally also includes two more gold medals, five silver medals and one bronze. Lorenzo was named the most valuable player of the 1992 FIVB World League after the Italians won the event for the third time in a row. Lorenzo was named the Best Player of the 1994 FIVB World Championship after Italy captured the gold medal for the second consecutive time. During Bernardi's final Olympic Games appearance in 1996 in Atlanta, Italy won all five of its Pool B matches in straight sets. Italy continued its success with a four-set victory over Argentina in the quarterfinals, followed by a four-set semifinal victory over Serbia and Montenegro to reach its first-ever Olympic gold-medal match. However, Netherlands battled to a five-set victory leaving Italy with the silver medal. Lorenzo was named the Best Player of the 1994 FIVB World Championship after Italy captured the gold medal for the second consecutive time. In 2004, he played some competitions in Qatar and after a spell in Greece and Olympiacos, he has returned to play in Italy as of November 2005. In spite of his late age of 37, he was declared MVP of the first match in his new Italian club career. In his later career he played for a B1 series (Italy's third category) near his native Trento, finishing his playing career with Montichiari in 2007. Overall, Bernardi competed 306 times for Italy in international competition. Lorenzo was part of nine Italian League championship teams to cement his legendary status in his home country. During the 2010/2011 season, he took over the head coach position of the Polish club Jastrzębski Węgiel, and was able to reach the 4th spot in the CEV Champions League. Bernardi in 2014 was named new coach of the Halkbank Ankara. In November 2016, he replaced Slobodan Kovač as coach of Sir Safety Perugia.

=== Style played ===
Lorenzo Bernardi’s 2011 hall of fame induction describes him as a “multi-talented hitter and excellent passer”. In this 1994 match versus Cuba, he is seen hitting off the blocker’s hands.

== Honours ==
=== As a player ===
- CEV European Champions Cup
  - 1989–90 – with Modena Volley
  - 1994–95 – with Sisley Treviso
  - 1998–99 – with Sisley Treviso
  - 1999–00 – with Sisley Treviso
- CEV Cup
  - 1985–86 – with Modena Volley
  - 1993–94 – with Sisley Treviso
- CEV Challenge Cup
  - 1990–91 – with Sisley Treviso
  - 1992–93 – with Sisley Treviso
  - 1997–98 – with Sisley Treviso
  - 2004–05 – with Lube Banca Macerata
- Domestic
  - 1985–86 Italian Cup, with Modena Volley
  - 1985–86 Italian Championship, with Modena Volley
  - 1986–87 Italian Championship, with Modena Volley
  - 1987–88 Italian Cup, with Modena Volley
  - 1987–88 Italian Championship, with Modena Volley
  - 1988–89 Italian Cup, with Modena Volley
  - 1988–89 Italian Championship, with Modena Volley
  - 1992–93 Italian Cup, with Sisley Treviso
  - 1993–94 Italian Championship, with Sisley Treviso
  - 1995–96 Italian Championship, with Sisley Treviso
  - 1997–98 Italian Championship, with Sisley Treviso
  - 1998–99 Italian SuperCup, with Sisley Treviso
  - 1999–2000 Italian SuperCup, with Sisley Treviso
  - 1999–2000 Italian Cup, with Sisley Treviso
  - 1999–2000 Italian Championship, with Sisley Treviso
  - 2000–01 Italian Championship, with Sisley Treviso
  - 2001–02 Italian SuperCup, with Sisley Treviso

=== As a coach ===
- Domestic
  - 2014–15 Turkish SuperCup, with Halkbank Ankara
  - 2014–15 Turkish Cup, with Halkbank Ankara
  - 2015–16 Turkish SuperCup, with Halkbank Ankara
  - 2015–16 Turkish Championship, with Halkbank Ankara
  - 2017–18 Italian SuperCup, with Sir Safety Perugia
  - 2017–18 Italian Cup, with Sir Safety Perugia
  - 2017–18 Italian Championship, with Sir Safety Perugia
  - 2018–19 Italian Cup, with Sir Safety Perugia

=== Individual awards ===
- 1992: FIVB World League – Most valuable player
- 1992: FIVB Club World Championship – Most valuable player
- 1994: FIVB World Championship – Most valuable player
- 1996: FIVB World League – Most valuable player
- 1996: FIVB World League – Best scorer

=== State awards ===
- 2000: Knight of the Order of Merit of the Italian Republic
