= 1997 Men's European Volleyball Championship =

Tournament details
- Host country: Netherlands
- Dates: September 6–14
- Teams: 12
- Venues: 2 (in 2 host cities)

Final positions
- Champions: Netherlands (1st title)

The 1997 Men's European Volleyball Championship was the 20th edition of the event, organized by Europe's governing volleyball body, the Confédération Européenne de Volleyball. It was hosted from September 6 to September 14 in two cities in the Netherlands – Den Bosch and Eindhoven.

== Qualification ==
The top four placed teams from the 1995 edition of the Men's European Volleyball Championship — Italy, Yugoslavia, Netherlands (also host) and Bulgaria — were automatically qualified for the 1997 edition. The other teams had to qualify in 1996.

== Teams ==
Group A – Den Bosch

- Germany
- Greece
- Italy
- Russia
- Slovakia
- Yugoslavia

Group B – Eindhoven

- Bulgaria
- Czech Republic
- Finland
- France
- Netherlands
- Ukraine

== Preliminary round ==
=== Group A ===
	Team	Points	G	W	L	PW	PL	Ratio	SW	SL	Ratio
1.	Yugoslavia	9	5	4	1	233	154	1.513	12	4	3.000
2.	Italy	9	5	4	1	220	161	1.366	12	4	3.000
3.	Slovakia	8	5	3	2	230	263	0.875	10	10	1.000
4.	Russia	7	5	2	3	248	227	1.093	10	9	1.111
5.	Germany	7	5	2	3	208	259	0.803	7	12	0.583
6.	Greece	5	5	0	5	176	251	0.701	3	15	0.200

- Saturday September 6

Italy	3 – 0	Greece	16-14 15- 4 15–03
Slovakia	3 – 1	Germany	13-15 15-12 15-09 15–10
Russia	3 – 0	Yugoslavia	16-14 15-11 15–13

- Sunday September 7

Germany	3 – 1	Greece	17-15 15-09 07-15 15–08
Slovakia	3 – 2	Russia	06-15 15-10 16-14 10-15 15–12
Yugoslavia	3 – 0	Italy	15-13 15-09 15–05

- Monday September 8

Germany	3 – 2	Russia	15-09 15-10 06-15 04-15 16–14
Italy	3 – 1	Slovakia	15-13 12-15 15-11 15–05
Yugoslavia	3 – 1	Greece	15-05 14-16 15-06 15–06

- Wednesday September 10

Italy	3 – 0	Germany	15-10 15-09 15–04
Russia	3 – 0	Greece	15-05 15-09 15–12
Yugoslavia	3 – 0	Slovakia	15-07 15-04 15–08

- Thursday September 11

Italy	3 – 0	Russia	15-06 15-10 15–12
Slovakia	3 – 1	Greece	15-10 15-11 02-15 15–13
Yugoslavia	3 – 0	Germany	15-08 16-14 15–07

=== Group B ===
	Team	Points	G	W	L	PW	PL	Ratio	SW	SL	Ratio
1.	Netherlands	10	5	5	0	226	91	2.484	15	0	MAX
2.	France	8	5	3	2	224	219	1.023	10	8	1.250
3.	Ukraine	8	5	3	2	260	251	1.036	11	10	1.100
4.	Czech Republic	7	5	2	3	260	276	0.942	10	12	0.833
5.	Bulgaria	7	5	2	3	219	263	0.833	8	12	0.666
6.	Finland	5	5	0	5	167	256	0.652	3	15	0.200

- Saturday September 6

Netherlands	3 – 0	Finland	15-03 15-07 15–02
Czech Republic	3 – 1	France	16-14 07-15 15-01 15–12
Ukraine	3 – 2	Bulgaria	08-15 15-07 11-15 15-10 15–09

- Sunday September 7

France	3 – 0	Finland	15-05 15-13 15–07
Netherlands	3 – 0	Ukraine	15-06 15-10 15–01
Bulgaria	3 – 2	Czech Republic	05-15 15-10 15-11 10-15 15–11

- Monday September 8

Ukraine	3 – 0	Finland	15-12 15-01 15–09
France	3 – 0	Bulgaria	15-10 17-15 15–02
Netherlands	3 – 0	Czech Republic	15-07 15-02 15–06

- Wednesday September 10

Bulgaria	3 – 1	Finland	15-12 09-15 15-07 15–11
Ukraine	3 – 2	Czech Republic	11-15 15-09 10-15 15-13 15–11
Netherlands	3 – 0	France	16-14 15-06 15–05

- Thursday September 11

Czech Republic	3 – 2	Finland	12-15 15-11 15-11 10-15 15–11
France	3 – 2	Ukraine	15-13 15-08 13-15 03-15 19–17
Netherlands	3 – 0	Bulgaria	15-03 15-09 15–10

== Final round ==
Semi-finals
1997-09-13
France	0
Yugoslavia	3
1997-09-13
Netherlands	3
Italy	0

Final
1997-09-14 – Eindhoven
Netherlands	3
Yugoslavia	1
3rd place
1997-09-14
Italy	3
France	1

- Friday September 13 — Semi-finals

Yugoslavia	3 – 0	France	15-06 17-15 15–11
Netherlands	3 – 0	Italy	15-09 15-06 15–13

- Saturday September 14 — Bronze Medal Match

Italy	3 – 1	France	15-02 15-06 10-15 15–08

- Saturday September 14 — Gold Medal Match

Netherlands	3 – 1	Yugoslavia	15-11 10-15 15-10 15–09

5-8th place
1997-09-13
Slovakia	0
Czech Republic	3
1997-09-13
Russia	3
Ukraine	0

5th place
1997-09-14
Czech Republic	0
Russia	3
7th place
1997-09-14
Ukraine	3
Slovakia	0

- Friday September 13 — Classification Matches

Czech Republic	3 – 0	Slovakia	15-10 15-11 15–11
Russia	3 – 0	Ukraine	15-10 15-04 15–12

- Saturday September 14 — Seventh Place Match

Slovakia	3 – 0	Ukraine	15-03 15-13 15–03

- Saturday September 14 — Fifth Place Match

Russia	3 – 0	Czech Republic	15-10 15-09 15–09

== Final ranking ==
Place	Team
1st place, gold medalist(s)	Netherlands
2nd place, silver medalist(s)	Yugoslavia
3rd place, bronze medalist(s)	Italy
4.	France
5.	Russia
6.	Czech Republic
7.	Ukraine
8.	Slovakia
9.	Bulgaria
9.	Germany
11.	Finland
11.	Greece

1997 Men's European champions

Netherlands
First title

Team Roster
Peter Blangé, Guido Görtzen, Henk-Jan Held, Albert Cristina, Reinder Nummerdor, Richard Schuil, Bas van de Goor, Mike van de Goor, Jochem de Gruijter, Misha Latuhihin, Olof van der Meulen, and Robert van Es.
Head coach: Toon Gerbrands.
