= Joop Alberda =

Dutch volleyball coach

Personal information
- Full name: Jogchum Theo Alberda
- Nickname: Joop
- Born: 25 October 1951 (age 74) Oosterwolde, Friesland, Netherlands
Medal record
Head coach for Netherlands men's volleyball
Representing the Netherlands
Olympic Games
Gold medal – first place	1996 Atlanta	Team

Joop Alberda (born 25 October 1952) is a retired volleyball coach from the Netherlands. He won a gold medal as coach of the Netherlands men's national volleyball team in the 1996 Summer Olympics in Atlanta by defeating Italy in the final (3-2).

In October 2014, Alberda was inducted into the International Volleyball Hall of Fame.

== Career ==
During his time as an active player, Alberda played on the highest national level as setter for the teams of Lycurgus and Donitas from the city of Groningen.

Alberda found that he had a knack for the training and coaching side of sport in general, and volleyball in particular. A major inspiration in this aspect was Doug Beal, whom he met in 1985. Beal had guided the United States men's national volleyball team to an Olympic gold the previous year, and his strategic approach appealed greatly to Alberda: controlling every possible detail, leaving nothing to chance.

In 1994, Alberda was appointed as head coach of the Dutch national men's volleyball team which had already been under way to international fame. Two years later this led to the gold medal in the 1996 Olympics.

In 1996, Alberda was elected as "best volleyball coach in the world" by the International Volleyball Federation (FIVB).

In 1997, Alberda filled the position of technical director of the Dutch Olympic Committee (NOC*NSF). Under his guidance, the Dutch delegation in the 2000 Sydney Olympics managed to win a record number of 25 medals. At the end of 2004, Alberda quit his position at the NOC*NSF.
