= 1997 FIVB Volleyball Men's World Grand Champions Cup =

1997 Men's World Grand Champions Cup

Tournament details
- Host country: Japan
- Dates: 15–24 November
- Teams: 6
- Venues: 3 (in 3 host cities)

Final positions
- Champions: Brazil (1st title)

The 1997 FIVB Volleyball Men's World Grand Champions Cup was held in Japan from 15 to 24 November 1997.

== Qualification ==
Team	Qualified as
Japan	Hosts
China	1997 Asian Champions
Netherlands	1997 European Champions
Cuba	1997 NORCECA Champions
Brazil	1997 South American Champions
Australia	Wild Card

== Competition formula ==
The competition formula of the 1997 Men's World Grand Champions Cup was the single Round-Robin system. Each team plays once against each of the 5 remaining teams. Points were accumulated during the whole tournament, and the final standing was determined by the total points gained.

== Venues ==
- Osaka-jō Hall, Osaka, Japan
- Hiroshima Green Arena, Hiroshima, Japan
- Yoyogi National Gymnasium, Tokyo, Japan

== Results ==
- All times are Japan Standard Time (UTC+09:00).

Pos	Team	Pld	W	L	Pts	SW	SL	SR	SPW	SPL	SPR
1	Brazil	5	5	0	10	15	3	5.000	267	175	1.526
2	Netherlands	5	3	2	8	12	9	1.333	289	287	1.007
3	Cuba	5	3	2	8	11	9	1.222	253	219	1.155
4	China	5	3	2	8	9	10	0.900	233	248	0.940
5	Japan	5	1	4	6	8	12	0.667	251	263	0.954
6	Australia	5	0	5	5	3	15	0.200	172	273	0.630

=== Osaka round ===
Date	Time		Score		Set 1	Set 2	Set 3	Set 4	Set 5	Total
15 Nov	13:00	Japan	3–0	Australia	15–4	15–10	15–3			45–17
15 Nov	15:00	China	3–1	Netherlands	15–13	15–10	12–15	15–5		57–43
15 Nov	17:00	Cuba	1–3	Brazil	15–13	10–15	4–15	9–15		38–58
17 Nov	14:00	Brazil	3–0	Australia	15–2	15–11	15–3			45–16
17 Nov	16:00	Cuba	3–0	China	15–12	15–11	15–3			45–26
17 Nov	18:30	Netherlands	3–2	Japan	15–9	22–24	16–14	11–15	15–9	79–71

=== Hiroshima round ===
Date	Time		Score		Set 1	Set 2	Set 3	Set 4	Set 5	Total
19 Nov	14:00	China	0–3	Brazil	5–15	12–15	10–15			27–45
19 Nov	16:00	Australia	0–3	Netherlands	24–26	12–15	5–15			41–56
19 Nov	18:30	Japan	2–3	Cuba	15–7	4–15	15–13	6–15	11–15	51–65

=== Tokyo round ===
Date	Time		Score		Set 1	Set 2	Set 3	Set 4	Set 5	Total
22 Nov	13:00	China	3–1	Japan	8–15	15–13	15–12	15–11		53–51
22 Nov	15:00	Brazil	3–2	Netherlands	15–9	15–12	13–15	12–15	15–10	70–61
22 Nov	17:00	Cuba	3–1	Australia	15–3	12–15	15–4	15–12		57–34
24 Nov	12:30	Australia	2–3	China	12–15	9–15	15–13	15–12	13–15	64–70
24 Nov	15:00	Japan	0–3	Brazil	5–15	11–15	17–19			33–49
24 Nov	17:00	Netherlands	3–1	Cuba	15–11	16–14	4–15	15–8		50–48

== Final standing ==
Rank	Team
1st place, gold medalist(s)	Brazil
2nd place, silver medalist(s)	Netherlands
3rd place, bronze medalist(s)	Cuba
4	China
5	Japan
6	Australia

1997 Men's World Grand Champions Cup champions

Brazil
First title

Team Roster

Roim, Leandro, Kid, Monzillo, Giba, Douglas, Nalbert, Gustavo, Joel, Renato Felizardo, Ricardo, Manius Abbadi

Head Coach: Radamés Lattari Filho

== Awards ==
- Best scorer: (Brazil) Nalbert Bitencourt
- Best spiker: (Netherlands) Bas van de Goor
- Best blocker: (China) Zheng Liang
- Best server: (Australia) David Beard
- Best digger: (China) Li Tieming
- Best setter: (Netherlands) Misha Latuhihin
- Best receiver: (Brazil) Nalbert Bitencourt
