= 1995 FIVB Volleyball Men's World Cup =

Volleyball competition held in Japan

1995 Men's World Cup
Tournament details
- Host country: Japan
- Dates: 18 November – 2 December
- Teams: 12
- Venues: 7 (in 7 host cities)

Final positions
- Champions: Italy (1st title)
- Runners-up: Netherlands
- Third place: Brazil
- Fourth place: United States

Tournament awards
- MVP: (Italy) Andrea Giani

The 1995 FIVB Men's World Cup was held from 18 November to 2 December 1995 in Japan. Twelve men's national teams played in cities all over Japan for the right to a fast lane ticket into the 1996 Summer Olympics in Atlanta. The first three qualified.

The twelve competing teams played a single-round robin format, in two parallel groups (site A and site B). The men played in Tokyo, Sendai, Fukushima, Chiba, Hiroshima, Kumamoto, and Kagoshima.

== Qualification ==
Means of qualification	Date	Host	Vacancies	Qualified
Host Country	—	―	1	Japan
1995 Men's European Volleyball Championship	8–16 September 1995	Greece	2	Italy
1995 Men's European Volleyball Championship	8–16 September 1995	Greece	2	Netherlands
1995 Men's NORCECA Volleyball Championship	18–23 September 1995	(Canada) Edmonton	2	Cuba
1995 Men's NORCECA Volleyball Championship	18–23 September 1995	(Canada) Edmonton	2	United States
1995 Men's South American Volleyball Championship	7–10 September 1995	(Brazil) Porto Alegre	2	Brazil
1995 Men's South American Volleyball Championship	7–10 September 1995	(Brazil) Porto Alegre	2	Argentina
1995 Asian Men's Volleyball Championship	11–23 September 1995	(South Korea) Seoul	2	China
1995 Asian Men's Volleyball Championship	11–23 September 1995	(South Korea) Seoul	2	South Korea
1995 Men's African Volleyball Championship	13–21 October 1995	(Tunisia) Tunis	1	Egypt
Wild Cards	―	―	2	Canada
Wild Cards	―	―	2	Tunisia
Total			12	

== Results ==
Pos	Team	Pld	W	L	Pts	SW	SL	SR	SPW	SPL	SPR
1	Italy	11	11	0	22	33	3	11.000	526	258	2.039
2	Netherlands	11	9	2	20	30	7	4.286	522	344	1.517
3	Brazil	11	9	2	20	29	7	4.143	516	297	1.737
4	United States	11	8	3	19	24	9	2.667	429	351	1.222
5	Japan	11	7	4	18	21	14	1.500	427	371	1.151
6	Cuba	11	7	4	18	23	18	1.278	498	491	1.014
7	Argentina	11	5	6	16	17	20	0.850	415	461	0.900
8	South Korea	11	3	8	14	12	24	0.500	404	467	0.865
9	China	11	3	8	14	11	26	0.423	371	483	0.768
10	Canada	11	3	8	14	11	27	0.407	385	527	0.731
11	Egypt	11	1	10	12	5	30	0.167	288	505	0.570
12	Tunisia	11	0	11	11	2	33	0.061	289	515	0.561

All times are Japan Standard Time (UTC+09:00).

=== First round ===
==== Site A ====
Location: Tokyo

Date	Time		Score		Set 1	Set 2	Set 3	Set 4	Set 5	Total	Report
18 Nov	14:30	Argentina	3–1	China	15–10	9–15	15–10	15–11		54–46	
18 Nov	16:30	Italy	3–0	Egypt	15–5	15–2	15–8			45–15	
18 Nov	18:30	Japan	3–1	Canada	14–16	15–13	15–6	15–7		59–42	
19 Nov	13:00	China	3–0	Egypt	15–7	15–4	15–8			45–19	
19 Nov	15:00	Italy	3–0	Canada	15–3	15–7	15–10			45–20	
19 Nov	18:00	Japan	3–0	Argentina	15–13	15–3	15–10			45–26	
20 Nov	14:00	Canada	3–2	Egypt	12–15	16–14	15–12	10–15	15–10	68–66	
20 Nov	15:30	Italy	3–0	Argentina	15–4	15–6	15–3			45–13	
20 Nov	18:15	Japan	3–0	China	15–4	15–10	15–4			45–18	

==== Site B ====
Location: Kumamoto

Date	Time		Score		Set 1	Set 2	Set 3	Set 4	Set 5	Total	Report
18 Nov	13:00	Netherlands	3–0	Tunisia	15–11	15–4	15–5			45–20	
18 Nov	15:00	Brazil	3–0	United States	15–8	15–13	15–8			45–29	
18 Nov	18:00	Cuba	3–0	South Korea	15–11	15–2	15–11			45–24	
19 Nov	13:00	United States	3–0	Tunisia	15–7	15–5	15–9			45–21	
19 Nov	15:00	Cuba	3–2	Netherlands	7–15	17–15	8–15	15–8	17–15	64–68	
19 Nov	18:00	Brazil	3–1	South Korea	15–3	12–15	15–3	15–11		57–32	
20 Nov	13:00	Netherlands	3–0	United States	15–10	15–7	15–6			45–23	
20 Nov	16:00	South Korea	3–0	Tunisia	15–10	15–9	15–10			45–29	
20 Nov	18:00	Brazil	3–0	Cuba	15–9	15–0	15–9			45–18	

=== Second round ===
==== Site A ====
Location: Hiroshima

Date	Time		Score		Set 1	Set 2	Set 3	Set 4	Set 5	Total	Report
22 Nov	12:30	Argentina	3–0	Canada	15–8	15–9	15–8			45–25	
22 Nov	15:30	Italy	3–0	China	15–4	15–3	15–3			45–10	
22 Nov	18:45	Japan	3–0	Egypt	15–9	15–5	15–8			45–22	
23 Nov	13:00	China	3–1	Canada	15–10	15–6	14–16	15–13		59–45	
23 Nov	16:00	Argentina	3–0	Egypt	15–5	15–5	15–6			45–16	
23 Nov	18:00	Italy	3–0	Japan	15–4	15–6	15–8			45–18	

==== Site B ====
Location: Kumamoto

Date	Time		Score		Set 1	Set 2	Set 3	Set 4	Set 5	Total	Report
22 Nov	12:30	Cuba	3–1	Tunisia	15–5	6–15	15–5	15–6		51–31	
22 Nov	15:00	Netherlands	3–1	Brazil	17–15	12–15	15–7	17–15		61–52	
22 Nov	18:00	United States	3–0	South Korea	15–9	15–11	15–13			45–33	
23 Nov	13:00	Brazil	3–0	Tunisia	15–6	15–9	15–12			45–27	
23 Nov	15:30	United States	3–0	Cuba	15–10	15–11	15–8			45–29	
23 Nov	18:30	Netherlands	3–0	South Korea	15–4	15–9	15–11			45–24	

=== Third round ===
==== Site A ====
Location: Sendai

Date	Time		Score		Set 1	Set 2	Set 3	Set 4	Set 5	Total	Report
26 Nov	13:00	Brazil	3–0	Argentina	15–6	15–3	15–4			45–13	
26 Nov	15:00	South Korea	3–0	China	15–11	15–11	15–5			45–27	
26 Nov	18:00	Japan	3–0	Tunisia	15–3	15–7	15–4			45–14	
28 Nov	13:00	Netherlands	3–0	Canada	15–7	15–10	15–1			45–18	
28 Nov	15:00	Egypt	3–0	Tunisia	15–3	17–15	16–14			48–32	
28 Nov	18:00	Japan	3–0	South Korea	15–6	15–13	15–9			45–28	
29 Nov	13:00	Brazil	3–0	Canada	15–5	15–4	15–6			45–15	
29 Nov	15:00	Italy	3–1	Cuba	15–12	7–15	15–8	15–3		52–38	
29 Nov	18:00	United States	3–0	Japan	15–7	15–12	15–9			45–28	

==== Site B ====
Location: Fukushima

Date	Time		Score		Set 1	Set 2	Set 3	Set 4	Set 5	Total	Report
26 Nov	13:00	Cuba	3–0	Canada	15–10	15–6	15–5			45–21	
26 Nov	15:15	Italy	3–1	Netherlands	13–15	15–6	15–8	15–3		58–32	
26 Nov	18:00	United States	3–0	Egypt	15–10	15–8	15–9			45–27	
28 Nov	12:30	Cuba	3–2	Argentina	15–13	8–15	7–15	15–13	18–16	63–72	
28 Nov	15:00	Italy	3–1	Brazil	15–9	10–15	16–14	15–8		56–46	
28 Nov	18:00	United States	3–0	China	15–7	15–4	15–6			45–17	
29 Nov	13:00	Netherlands	3–0	Argentina	15–7	15–2	15–6			45–15	
29 Nov	15:30	South Korea	3–0	Egypt	15–10	15–7	15–1			45–18	
29 Nov	18:00	China	3–1	Tunisia	11–15	15–7	15–7	15–7		56–36	

=== Fourth round ===
==== Site A ====
Location: Tokyo

Date	Time		Score		Set 1	Set 2	Set 3	Set 4	Set 5	Total	Report
30 Nov	14:00	Canada	3–0	Tunisia	15–12	15–5	15–12			45–29	
30 Nov	15:30	United States	3–0	Argentina	15–11	15–5	15–12			45–28	
30 Nov	18:30	Japan	3–1	Cuba	13–15	15–5	16–14	15–7		59–41	
1 Dec	12:30	Italy	3–0	United States	15–8	15–8	15–4			45–20	
1 Dec	15:30	Brazil	3–0	China	15–4	15–7	15–7			45–18	
1 Dec	18:00	Netherlands	3–0	Japan	15–3	15–11	15–12			45–26	
2 Dec	14:00	Italy	3–0	Tunisia	15–5	15–5	15–9			45–19	
2 Dec	16:00	Cuba	3–1	China	14–16	15–11	15–12	15–13		59–52	
2 Dec	18:00	Brazil	3–0	Japan	15–3	15–5	15–4			45–12	

==== Site B ====
Location: Chiba

Date	Time		Score		Set 1	Set 2	Set 3	Set 4	Set 5	Total	Report
30 Nov	13:00	Italy	3–0	South Korea	15–13	15–7	15–10			45–30	
30 Nov	15:30	Netherlands	3–0	China	15–10	15–10	15–3			45–23	
30 Nov	18:00	Brazil	3–0	Egypt	15–2	15–6	15–8			45–16	
1 Dec	13:00	Argentina	3–0	Tunisia	15–12	15–8	15–12			45–32	
1 Dec	15:30	Canada	3–1	South Korea	15–9	8–15	15–10	15–10		53–44	
1 Dec	18:00	Cuba	3–0	Egypt	15–6	15–11	15–4			45–21	
2 Dec	13:00	United States	3–0	Canada	15–13	15–10	15–10			45–33	
2 Dec	15:30	Netherlands	3–0	Egypt	15–3	15–9	15–8			45–20	
2 Dec	18:00	Argentina	3–1	South Korea	12–15	16–14	16–14	15–11		59–54	

== Final standing ==
Rank	Team
1st place, gold medalist(s)	Italy
2nd place, silver medalist(s)	Netherlands
3rd place, bronze medalist(s)	Brazil
4	United States
5	Japan
6	Cuba
7	Argentina
8	South Korea
9	China
10	Canada
11	Egypt
12	Tunisia

Qualified for the 1996 Summer Olympics

1995 Men's World Cup champions

Italy
1st title

Team roster
Andrea Sartoretti, Andrea Giani, Lorenzo Bernardi, Marco Bracci, Andrea Gardini, Pasquale Gravina, Samuele Papi, Andrea Zorzi, Vigor Bovolenta, David Bellini
Head coach
Julio Velasco

== Awards ==
- Most valuable player
  (Italy) Andrea Giani
- Best scorer
  (Argentina) Marcos Milinkovic
- Best spiker
  (Netherlands) Bas van de Goor
- Best server
  (United States) Lloy Ball
- Best blocker
  (Canada) Jason Haldane
- Best digger
  (Argentina) Pablo Pereira
- Best setter
  (Netherlands) Peter Blangé
- Best receiver
  (Canada) Gino Brousseau
