= 1994 FIVB Men's Volleyball World Championship =

1994 FIVB World Championship
Tournament details
- Host country: Greece
- Dates: 29 September – 8 October
- Teams: 16
- Venues: 2 (in 2 host cities)
- Officially opened by: Konstantinos Karamanlis

Final positions
- Champions: Italy (2nd title)

The 1994 FIVB Men's World Championship was the thirteenth edition of the tournament, organized by the world's governing body, the FIVB. It was held from 29 September to 8 October 1994 in Piraeus (Peace and Friendship Stadium) and Thessaloniki (Alexandreio Melathron Nick Galis Hall), Greece.

== Qualification ==
Means of qualification	Date	Host	Vacancies	Qualified
Host country	—N/a	—N/a	1	Greece
Volleyball at the 1992 Summer Olympics	26 Jul – 9 Aug 1992	(Spain) Barcelona	1	Brazil
1990 FIVB Men's Volleyball World Championship	18–28 October 1990	Brazil	2	Italy
1990 FIVB Men's Volleyball World Championship	18–28 October 1990	Brazil	2	Cuba
1993 Men's European Volleyball Championship	4–12 September 1993	Finland	1	Netherlands
World Qualifier	12–28 November 1993	(Spain) Granada	6	Bulgaria
World Qualifier	12–28 November 1993	(Germany) Koblenz	6	Germany
World Qualifier	12–28 November 1993	(France) Paris	6	United States
World Qualifier	12–28 November 1993	(Russia) Moscow	6	Russia
World Qualifier	12–28 November 1993	(Poland) Wrocław	6	Sweden
World Qualifier	12–28 November 1993	(Tunisia) Tunis	6	Canada
1993 Asian Men's Volleyball Championship	11–19 September 1993	(Thailand) Nakhon Ratchasima	1	South Korea
Asian Qualifier	6–11 November 1993	(Australia) Sydney	2	Japan
Asian Qualifier	6–11 November 1993	(Australia) Sydney	2	China
South American Qualifier	15–17 October 1993	(Argentina) Neuquén	1	Argentina
1993 Men's African Volleyball Championship	9–16 September 1993	(Algeria) Algiers	1	Algeria
Total			16	

== Teams ==
Group A

- Algeria
- Canada
- Greece
- Russia

Group B

- Argentina
- Brazil
- Germany
- United States

Group C

- Bulgaria
- China
- Italy
- Japan

Group D

- Cuba
- Netherlands
- South Korea
- Sweden

== Venues ==
1994 FIVB Men's Volleyball World Championship (Greece)	Pool A, B and Final round	Pool C and D
1994 FIVB Men's Volleyball World Championship (Greece)	Piraeus, Greece	Thessaloniki, Greece
1994 FIVB Men's Volleyball World Championship (Greece)	Peace and Friendship Stadium	Alexandreio Melathron
1994 FIVB Men's Volleyball World Championship (Greece)	Capacity: 15,000	Capacity: 6,000

== Results ==
=== First round ===
==== Pool A ====
Venue: Peace and Friendship Stadium, Piraeus

Pos	Team	Pld	W	L	Pts	SW	SL	SR	SPW	SPL	SPR	Qualification
1	Greece	3	3	0	6	9	2	4.500	147	111	1.324	Quarterfinals
2	Russia	3	2	1	5	8	5	1.600	184	148	1.243	Play-offs for quarterfinals
3	Canada	3	1	2	4	5	6	0.833	139	141	0.986	Play-offs for quarterfinals
4	Algeria	3	0	3	3	0	9	0.000	65	135	0.481	

Date		Score		Set 1	Set 2	Set 3	Set 4	Set 5	Total
29 Sep	Russia	3–0	Algeria	15–10	15–6	15–3			45–19
29 Sep	Greece	3–0	Canada	15–7	15–3	15–12			45–22
30 Sep	Russia	3–2	Canada	10–15	17–16	12–15	15–11	17–15	71–72
30 Sep	Greece	3–0	Algeria	15–13	15–1	15–7			45–21
01 Oct	Canada	3–0	Algeria	15–10	15–11	15–4			45–25
01 Oct	Greece	3–2	Russia	8–15	15–13	4–15	15–12	15–13	57–68

==== Pool B ====
Venue: Peace and Friendship Stadium, Piraeus

Pos	Team	Pld	W	L	Pts	SW	SL	SR	SPW	SPL	SPR	Qualification
1	United States	3	3	0	6	9	3	3.000	169	136	1.243	Quarterfinals
2	Brazil	3	2	1	5	8	5	1.600	170	127	1.339	Play-offs for quarterfinals
3	Germany	3	1	2	4	4	7	0.571	102	147	0.694	Play-offs for quarterfinals
4	Argentina	3	0	3	3	3	9	0.333	127	158	0.804	

Date		Score		Set 1	Set 2	Set 3	Set 4	Set 5	Total
29 Sep	United States	3–1	Germany	15–13	14–16	15–4	15–10		59–43
29 Sep	Brazil	3–2	Argentina	7–15	10–15	15–4	15–10	15–10	62–54
30 Sep	United States	3–0	Argentina	15–10	16–14	15–6			46–30
30 Sep	Brazil	3–0	Germany	15–1	15–4	15–4			45–9
01 Oct	Germany	3–1	Argentina	16–14	4–15	15–8	15–6		50–43
01 Oct	United States	3–2	Brazil	15–12	15–9	9–15	10–15	15–12	64–63

==== Pool C ====
Venue: Alexandreio Melathron Nick Galis Hall, Thessaloniki

Pos	Team	Pld	W	L	Pts	SW	SL	SR	SPW	SPL	SPR	Qualification
1	Italy	3	2	1	5	8	3	2.667	155	119	1.303	Quarterfinals
2	Bulgaria	3	2	1	5	6	4	1.500	135	122	1.107	Play-offs for quarterfinals
3	Japan	3	1	2	4	4	8	0.500	152	173	0.879	Play-offs for quarterfinals
4	China	3	1	2	4	3	6	0.500	95	123	0.772	

Date		Score		Set 1	Set 2	Set 3	Set 4	Set 5	Total
29 Sep	Bulgaria	3–1	Japan	16–14	15–9	16–14	15–11		62–48
29 Sep	Italy	3–0	China	15–8	15–8	15–4			45–20
30 Sep	China	3–0	Japan	15–13	16–14	15–6			46–33
30 Sep	Italy	3–0	Bulgaria	15–9	15–8	15–11			45–28
01 Oct	Bulgaria	3–0	China	15–10	15–11	15–8			45–29
01 Oct	Japan	3–2	Italy	15–4	17–15	8–15	14–16	17–15	71–65

==== Pool D ====
Venue: Alexandreio Melathron Nick Galis Hall, Thessaloniki

Pos	Team	Pld	W	L	Pts	SW	SL	SR	SPW	SPL	SPR	Qualification
1	Cuba	3	3	0	6	9	2	4.500	158	130	1.215	Quarterfinals
2	Netherlands	3	2	1	5	6	5	1.200	154	118	1.305	Play-offs for quarterfinals
3	South Korea	3	1	2	4	6	8	0.750	161	177	0.910	Play-offs for quarterfinals
4	Sweden	3	0	3	3	3	9	0.333	114	162	0.704	

Date		Score		Set 1	Set 2	Set 3	Set 4	Set 5	Total
29 Sep	Cuba	3–2	South Korea	12–15	17–16	15–9	9–15	15–10	68–65
29 Sep	Netherlands	3–1	Sweden	15–8	15–9	12–15	15–5		57–37
30 Sep	Netherlands	3–1	South Korea	15–7	13–15	15–8	15–6		58–36
30 Sep	Cuba	3–0	Sweden	15–8	15–9	15–9			45–26
01 Oct	South Korea	3–2	Sweden	15–7	15–7	6–15	9–15	15–7	60–51
01 Oct	Cuba	3–0	Netherlands	15–12	15–13	16–14			45–39

=== Final round ===
Venue: Peace and Friendship Stadium, Piraeus

Play-off; 4 October
Netherlands	3
Japan	0
Bulgaria	1
South Korea	3
Russia	3
Germany	0
Brazil	3
Canada	0

Quarterfinals; 5 October
Greece	0
Netherlands	3
United States	3
South Korea	0
Italy	3
Russia	1
Cuba	3
Brazil	2

Semifinals; 7 October
Netherlands	3
United States	2
Italy	3
Cuba	1

Final; 08 October
Netherlands	1
Italy	3
Third place
United States	3
Cuba	1

5th–8th semifinals
7 October
Greece	3
South Korea	1
7 October
Russia	0
Brazil	3

5th place
8 October
Greece	0
Brazil	3
7th place
8 October
South Korea	0
Russia	3

==== Play-offs for quarterfinals ====
Date		Score		Set 1	Set 2	Set 3	Set 4	Set 5	Total
4 Oct	Netherlands	3–0	Japan	15–8	15–7	15–5			45–20
4 Oct	Bulgaria	1–3	South Korea	15–17	7–15	15–11	2–15		39–58
4 Oct	Russia	3–0	Germany	15–3	15–9	16–14			46–26
4 Oct	Brazil	3–0	Canada	15–12	16–14	15–10			46–36

==== Group head matches ====
Date		Score		Set 1	Set 2	Set 3	Set 4	Set 5	Total
4 Oct	Italy	3–0	Greece	16–14	15–6	15–2			46–22
4 Oct	Cuba	0–3	United States	6–15	13–15	12–15			31–45

==== Finals ====
===== Quarterfinals =====
Date		Score		Set 1	Set 2	Set 3	Set 4	Set 5	Total
5 Oct	Greece	0–3	Netherlands	12–15	5–15	5–15			22–45
5 Oct	United States	3–0	South Korea	15–2	15–4	16–14			46–20
5 Oct	Italy	3–1	Russia	15–4	16–17	15–3	15–5		61–29
5 Oct	Cuba	3–2	Brazil	15–12	12–15	15–12	8–15	15–12	65–66

===== 5th–8th semifinals =====
Date		Score		Set 1	Set 2	Set 3	Set 4	Set 5	Total
7 Oct	Greece	3–1	South Korea	15–9	14–16	15–11	15–6		59–42
7 Oct	Russia	0–3	Brazil	5–15	12–15	5–15			22–45

===== Semifinals =====
Date		Score		Set 1	Set 2	Set 3	Set 4	Set 5	Total
7 Oct	Netherlands	3–2	United States	5–15	16–14	10–15	15–8	15–11	61–63
7 Oct	Italy	3–1	Cuba	15–12	8–15	15–9	15–2		53–38

===== 7th place match =====
Date		Score		Set 1	Set 2	Set 3	Set 4	Set 5	Total
8 Oct	South Korea	0–3	Russia	11–15	3–15	4–15			18–45

===== 5th place match =====
Date		Score		Set 1	Set 2	Set 3	Set 4	Set 5	Total
8 Oct	Greece	0–3	Brazil	5–15	9–15	9–15			23–45

===== 3rd place match =====
Date		Score		Set 1	Set 2	Set 3	Set 4	Set 5	Total
8 Oct	United States	3–1	Cuba	15–6	14–16	15–8	15–9		59–39

===== Final =====
Date		Score		Set 1	Set 2	Set 3	Set 4	Set 5	Total
8 Oct	Netherlands	1–3	Italy	10–15	15–11	11–15	1–15		37–56

== Final standing ==
Rank	Team
1st place, gold medalist(s)	Italy
2nd place, silver medalist(s)	Netherlands
3rd place, bronze medalist(s)	United States
4	Cuba
5	Brazil
6	Greece
7	Russia
8	South Korea
9	Bulgaria
10	Canada
11	Germany
12	Japan
13	Algeria
14	Argentina
15	China
16	Sweden

1994 Men's World champions

Italy
2nd title

Team Roster
Lorenzo Bernardi, Marco Bracci, Luca Cantagalli, Andrea Gardini, Andrea Giani, Ferdinando De Giorgi, Giacomo Giretto, Pasquale Gravina, Samuele Papi, Damiano Pippi, Paolo Tofoli, Andrea Zorzi
Head coach
Julio Velasco

== Awards ==
- Most valuable player
  (Italy) Lorenzo Bernardi
- Best spiker
  (Netherlands) Ron Zwerver
- Best blocker
  (Netherlands) Jan Posthuma
- Best server
  (Brazil) Marcelo Negrão
- Best setter
  (Italy) Paolo Tofoli
- Best receiver
  (United States) Scott Fortune
- Best digger
  (United States) Bob Ctvrtlik
