= FIVB Volleyball World League =

International volleyball tournament

- Sport: Volleyball
- Founded: 1990
- Folded: 2017
- Replaced by: Nations League; Challenger Cup
- No. of teams: 12 in Group 1; 12 in Group 2; 12 in Group 3
- Continent: International (FIVB)
- Last champion: France (2nd title)
- Most titles: Brazil (9 titles)

The FIVB Volleyball World League was an annual international men's volleyball competition. Created in 1990, it was the longest and richest of all the international events organized by the Fédération Internationale de Volleyball (FIVB). The women's version of the competition was called FIVB Volleyball World Grand Prix. This event should not be confused with the other international volleyball competitions, the World Championship, the World Cup and the World Grand Champions Cup.

From 2018, the World League and World Grand Prix was replaced by the men's and women's Nations League and men's and women's Challenger Cup.

== History ==
=== Origins ===
First FIVB World League logo

Second FIVB World League logo

The World League was created in 1990 as part of the intensive marketing programme that would become a distinctive mark of the FIVB's activities near the end of the century. The idea was to promote the sport of volleyball by establishing an annual competition that would appeal to audiences all over the world.

=== Winners ===
In the 1990s, the Italians dominated the World League, winning the first three tournaments in 1990, 1991 and 1992. Playing at home, Brazil, at the time the Olympic champions, managed to take the gold in 1993, but Italy regained the title in 1994 and 1995.

In 1996, foreshadowing what would happen just a couple of months later at the Atlanta Olympic Games, the Netherlands beat them in an extremely tight five-set match, before Italy once again won the gold in 1997. In 1998, the winners were Cuba, while in 1999 and 2000 Italy won again.

As can be seen, Italy were clearly the dominant team in the first decade of the World League: from 1990 to 2000, the World League was played 11 times, and Italy took gold eight times, while the remaining three titles were won by three different teams.

Italy's supremacy in the World League began to wane in 2001, when Brazil won a second gold medal, beating the Italians in three straight sets. With further titles each year from 2003 to 2007, and winning another titles in 2009 and 2010, the Brazilians were the preeminent at the start of the 21st century, being also World and Olympic Champions. The interruptions to Brazil's dominance came in 2002, when Russia took the title, and in 2008, with the United States winning gold and gaining positive momentum going into the Beijing Olympics.

== Competition formula ==
The FIVB is constantly adapting the World League's competition formula to improve competitiveness and to make the games more attractive to the audience. Nevertheless, a few basic rules and restrictions will probably remain unchanged in the following years.

- Teams who participate must provide local media coverage and live TV broadcasting.
- The competition is divided in at least two phases: a preliminary round (usually called "Intercontinental Round"), with a system of rotating host cities; and one or more final rounds, with one or more host nations.
- In the preliminary round, teams are organized in pools. Each team plays a total of four matches against all other teams in its pool, two at home, two as visitors. Each pair of matches is played over a weekend.
- When all the matches of the preliminary round have been played, the top n teams in each pool qualify for the final round(s), and the remaining ones leave the competition. The value of n depends on the number of participating teams and the format that will be employed in the finals.
- Host nation(s) automatically qualify for the final round(s).
- The FIVB has tried various formats for the final round(s): Top Six, Top Four, Quarter-Semi-finals (Olympic format). For some years now (2004), the most commonly used is a mixed format: quarterfinalists are organized in two pools, and the top two teams in each pool play semifinals and finals according to the Olympic format.
- In the preliminary round, a team is usually given the right to work with a list of nineteen players, from which the coach builds the fourteen-player line-up included two liberos (if the team include only one libero in the roster, their max roster number is limited to 12) that will be employed in a particular weekend. For the final round(s), only fourteen players included two liberos are allowed.

== Hosts ==
List of hosts by number of final round championships hosted.

Times hosted	Hosts	Year(s)
6	Italy	1991, 1992, 1994, 1998, 2004, 2014
6	Brazil	1993, 1995, 2002, 2008, 2015, 2017
4	Poland	2001, 2007, 2011, 2016
3	Argentina	1999, 2010, 2013
2	Netherlands	1996, 2000
2	Russia	1997, 2006
2	Serbia	2005, 2009
1	Japan	1990
1	Spain	2003
1	Bulgaria	2012

== Appearance ==
Brazil and Italy are the only teams that participated in all editions of the World League.

Team	Intercontinental Round			Final Round (Note: Since Group system was introduced in 2014, statistics of only Group 1 Final Round are included, as this is the medal round.)		
Team	App.	First	Last	App.	First	Last
Brazil	28	1990	2017	25	1990	2017
Italy	28	1990	2017	22	1990	2016
Russia (Note: Russia's total includes appearances as Soviet Union and CIS.)	26	1990	2017	22	1990	2017
Cuba	26	1991	2016	15	1991	2012
Japan	24	1990	2017	1	2008	2008
France	22	1990	2017	7	2001	2017
Netherlands	21	1990	2017	10	1990	2002
Serbia (Note: Serbia's total includes appearances as Yugoslavia and Serbia and Montenegro.)	20	1997	2017	13	2000	2017
United States	20	1990	2017	11	1992	2017
Bulgaria	20	1994	2017	10	1994	2013
Poland	20	1998	2017	9	2001	2016
Argentina	19	1996	2017	5	1999	2013
South Korea	19	1991	2017	1	1995	1995
China	18	1990	2017	1	1996	1996
Spain	15	1995	2017	3	1999	2003
Portugal	14	1999	2017	–	–	–
Greece	13	1993	2017	1	2003	2003
Germany	13	1992	2017	1	2012	2012
Finland	13	1993	2017	–	–	–
Canada	11	1991	2017	2	2013	2017
Venezuela	9	2001	2017	–	–	–
Egypt	7	2006	2017	–	–	–
Czech Republic	5	2003	2017	1	2003	2003
Australia	5	1999	2017	1	2014	2014
Iran	5	2013	2017	1	2014	2014
Puerto Rico	4	2011	2016	–	–	–
Belgium	4	2014	2017	–	–	–
Mexico	4	2014	2017	–	–	–
Slovakia	4	2014	2017	–	–	–
Tunisia	4	2014	2017	–	–	–
Turkey	4	2014	2017	–	–	–
Kazakhstan	3	2015	2017	–	–	–
Montenegro	3	2015	2017	–	–	–
Chinese Taipei	2	2016	2017	–	–	–
Qatar	2	2016	2017	–	–	–
Slovenia	2	2016	2017	–	–	–
Austria	1	2017	2017	–	–	–
Estonia	1	2017	2017	–	–	–

Team last allocated in Group 1
Team last allocated in Group 2
Team last allocated in Group 3
Team was inactive in the last World League

== Results summary ==
Year	Final host	Final			3rd place match			Teams IR / FR
Year	Final host	Champions	Score	Runners-up	3rd place	Score	4th place	Teams IR / FR
1990	(Japan); Osaka	Italy	3–0	Netherlands	Brazil	3–1	Soviet Union	8 / 4
1991	(Italy); Milan	Italy	3–0	Cuba	Soviet Union	3–1	Netherlands	10 / 4
1992	(Italy); Genoa	Italy	3–1	Cuba	United States	3–1	Netherlands	12 / 4
1993	(Brazil); São Paulo	Brazil	3–0	Russia	Italy	3–0	Cuba	12 / 4
1994	(Italy); Milan	Italy	3–0	Cuba	Brazil	3–2	Bulgaria	12 / 6
1995	(Brazil); Rio de Janeiro	Italy	3–1	Brazil	Cuba	3–2	Russia	12 / 6
1996	(Netherlands); Rotterdam	Netherlands	3–2	Italy	Russia	3–2	Cuba	11 / 6
1997	(Russia); Moscow	Italy	3–0	Cuba	Russia	3–0	Netherlands	12 / 6
1998	(Italy); Milan	Cuba	Round-robin	Russia	Netherlands	Round-robin	Italy	12 / 4
1999	(Argentina); Mar del Plata	Italy	3–1	Cuba	Brazil	3–1	Russia	12 / 6
2000	(Netherlands); Rotterdam	Italy	3–2	Russia	Brazil	3–0	Yugoslavia	12 / 6
2001	(Poland); Katowice	Brazil	3–0	Italy	Russia	3–0	Yugoslavia	16 / 8
2002	(Brazil); Belo Horizonte / Recife	Russia	3–1	Brazil	Yugoslavia	3–1	Italy	16 / 8
2003	(Spain); Madrid	Brazil	3–2	Serbia and Montenegro	Italy	3–1	Czech Republic	16 / 8
2004	(Italy); Rome	Brazil	3–1	Italy	Serbia and Montenegro	3–0	Bulgaria	12 / 4
2005	(Serbia and Montenegro); Belgrade	Brazil	3–1	Serbia and Montenegro	Cuba	3–2	Poland	12 / 4
2006	(Russia); Moscow	Brazil	3–2	France	Russia	3–0	Bulgaria	16 / 6
2007	(Poland); Katowice	Brazil	3–1	Russia	United States	3–1	Poland	16 / 6
2008	(Brazil); Rio de Janeiro	United States	3–1	Serbia	Russia	3–1	Brazil	16 / 6
2009	(Serbia); Belgrade	Brazil	3–2	Serbia	Russia	3–0	Cuba	16 / 6
2010	(Argentina); Córdoba	Brazil	3–1	Russia	Serbia	3–2	Cuba	16 / 6
2011	(Poland); Gdańsk–Sopot	Russia	3–2	Brazil	Poland	3–0	Argentina	16 / 8
2012	(Bulgaria); Sofia	Poland	3–0	United States	Cuba	3–2	Bulgaria	16 / 6
2013	(Argentina); Mar del Plata	Russia	3–0	Brazil	Italy	3–2	Bulgaria	18 / 6
2014	(Italy); Florence	United States	3–1	Brazil	Italy	3–0	Iran	28 / 6
2015	(Brazil); Rio de Janeiro	France	3–0	Serbia	United States	3–0	Poland	32 / 6
2016	(Poland); Kraków	Serbia	3–0	Brazil	France	3–0	Italy	36 / 6
2017	(Brazil); Curitiba	France	3–2	Brazil	Canada	3–1	United States	36 / 6

== Medals summary ==
Rank	Nation	Gold	Silver	Bronze	Total
1	Brazil	9	7	4	20
2	Italy	8	3	4	15
3	Russia	3	5	6	14
4	United States	2	1	3	6
5	France	2	1	1	4
6	Cuba	1	5	3	9
7	Serbia	1	3	1	5
8	Netherlands	1	1	1	3
9	Poland	1	0	1	2
10	FR Yugoslavia / Serbia and Montenegro	0	2	2	4
11	Canada	0	0	1	1
11	Soviet Union	0	0	1	1
Totals (12 entries)		28	28	28	84

== Most valuable player by edition ==
- 1990 – Andrea Zorzi (ITA)
- 1991 – Andrea Zorzi (ITA)
- 1992 – Lorenzo Bernardi (ITA)
- 1993 – Giovane Gávio (BRA)
- 1994 – Andrea Giani (ITA)
- 1995 – Dmitry Fomin (RUS)
- 1996 – Lorenzo Bernardi (ITA)
- 1997 – Guido Görtzen (NED)
- 1998 – Osvaldo Hernández (CUB)
- 1999 – Osvaldo Hernández (CUB)
- 2000 – Andrea Sartoretti (ITA)
- 2001 – Ivan Miljković (YUG)
- 2002 – Ivan Miljković (YUG)
- 2003 – Ivan Miljković (SCG)
- 2004 – Andrea Sartoretti (ITA)
- 2005 – Ivan Miljković (SCG)
- 2006 – Gilberto Godoy Filho (BRA)
- 2007 – Ricardo Garcia (BRA)
- 2008 – Lloy Ball (USA)
- 2009 – Sérgio Santos (BRA)
- 2010 – Murilo Endres (BRA)
- 2011 – Maxim Mikhaylov (RUS)
- 2012 – Bartosz Kurek (POL)
- 2013 – Nikolay Pavlov (RUS)
- 2014 – Taylor Sander (USA)
- 2015 – Earvin N'Gapeth (FRA)
- 2016 – Marko Ivović (SRB)
- 2017 – Earvin N'Gapeth (FRA)

== Gallery ==
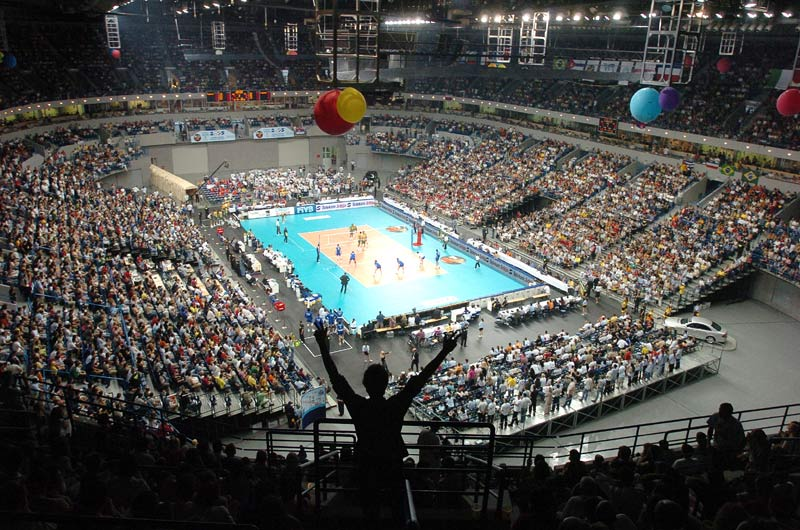
FIVB World League Final Match Brazil vs Serbia and Montenegro, July 10, 2005

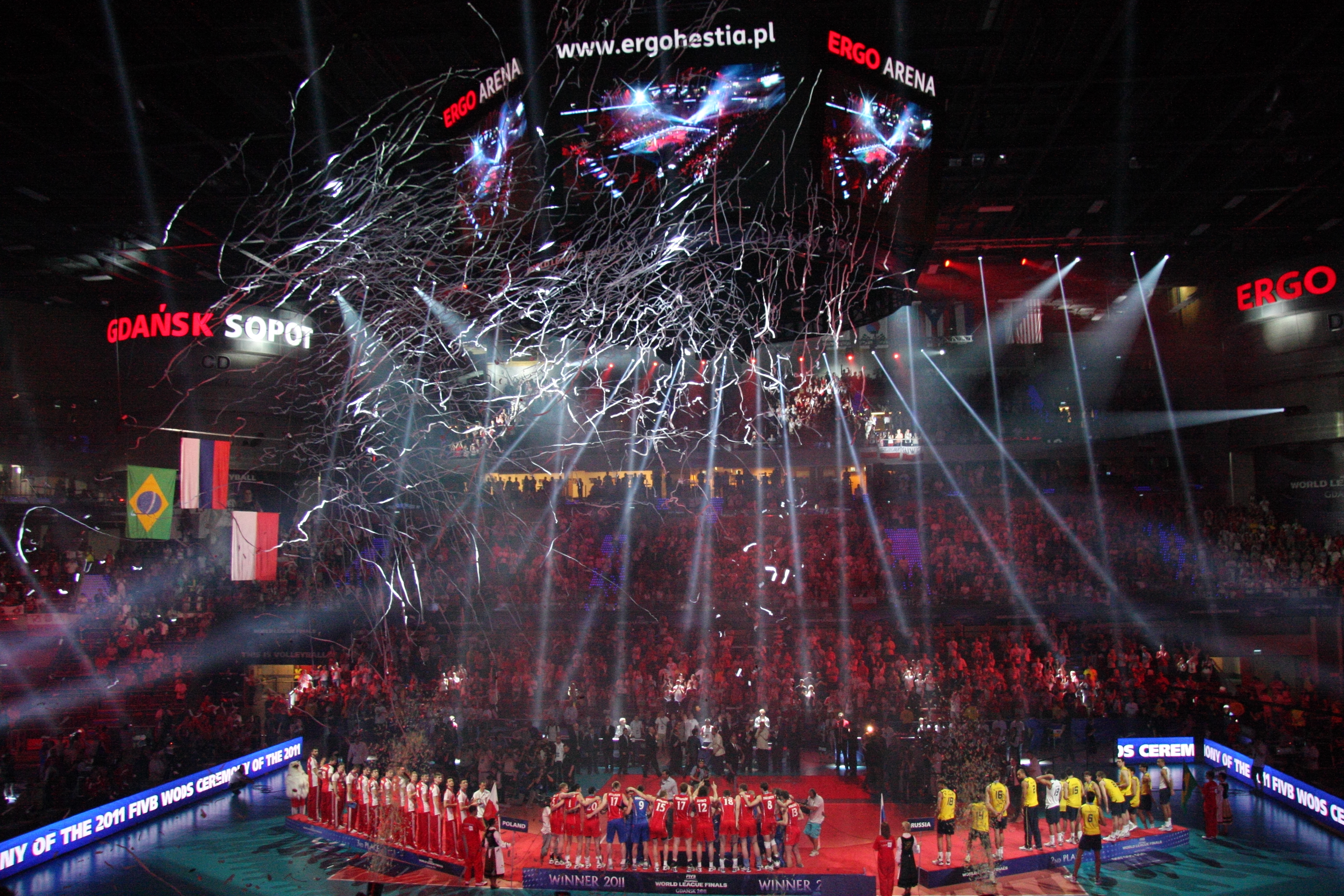
Cup Ceremony FIVB World League 2011 (Russia Champions)

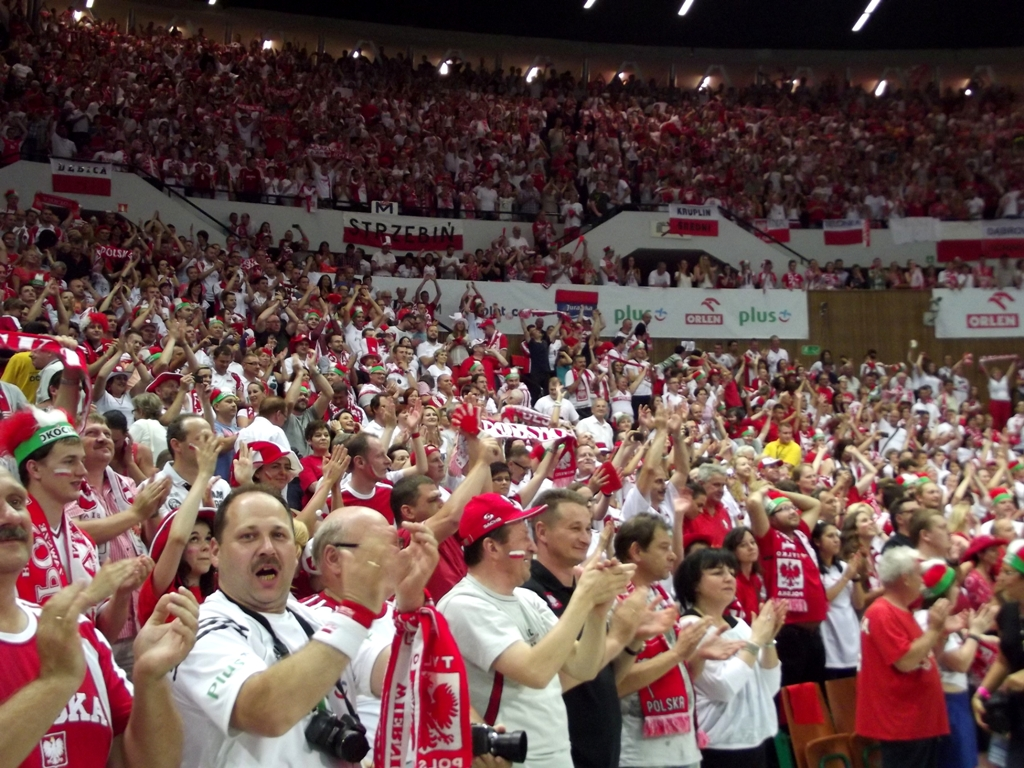
Poland fans at FIVB World League 2013

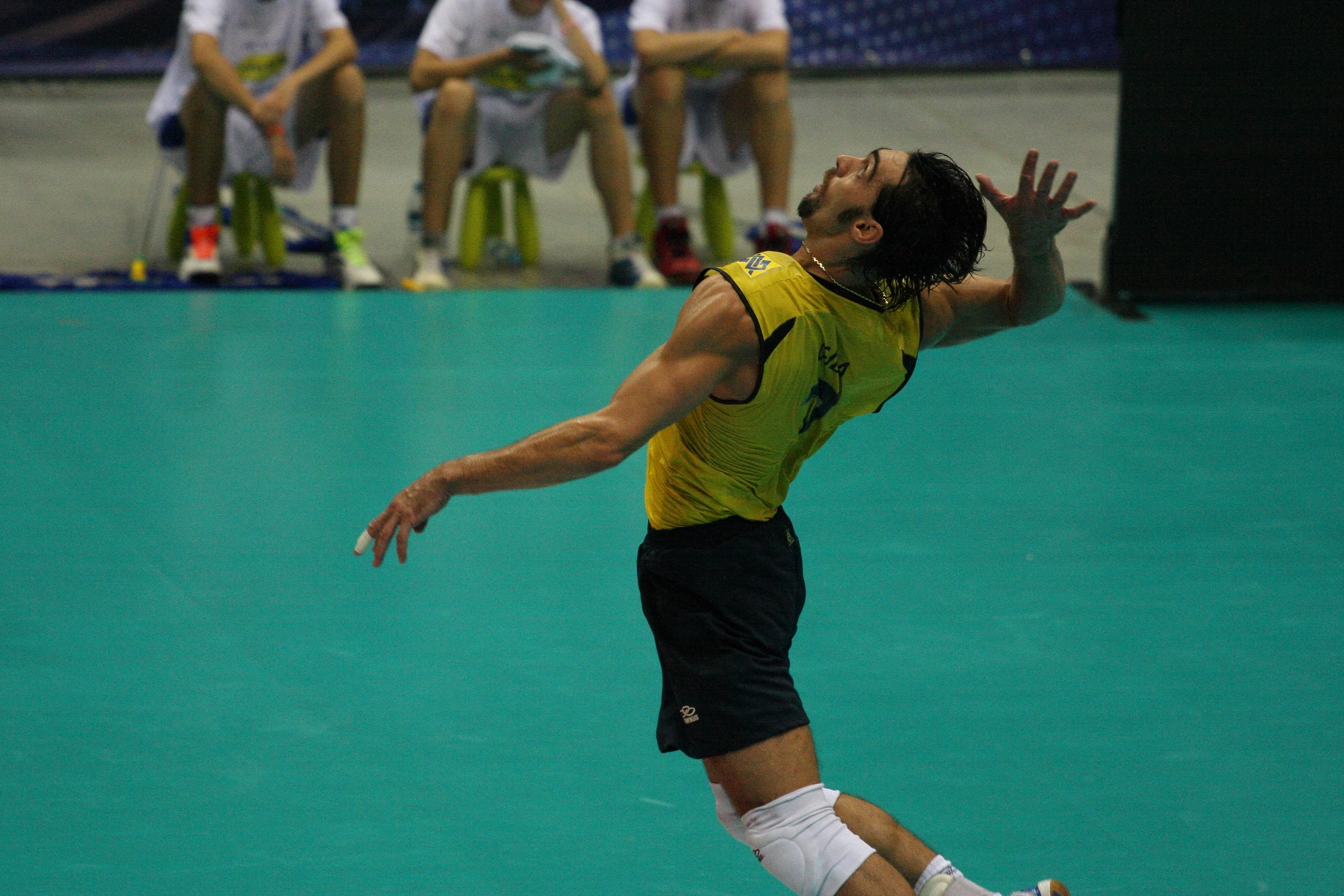
Spike by Giba

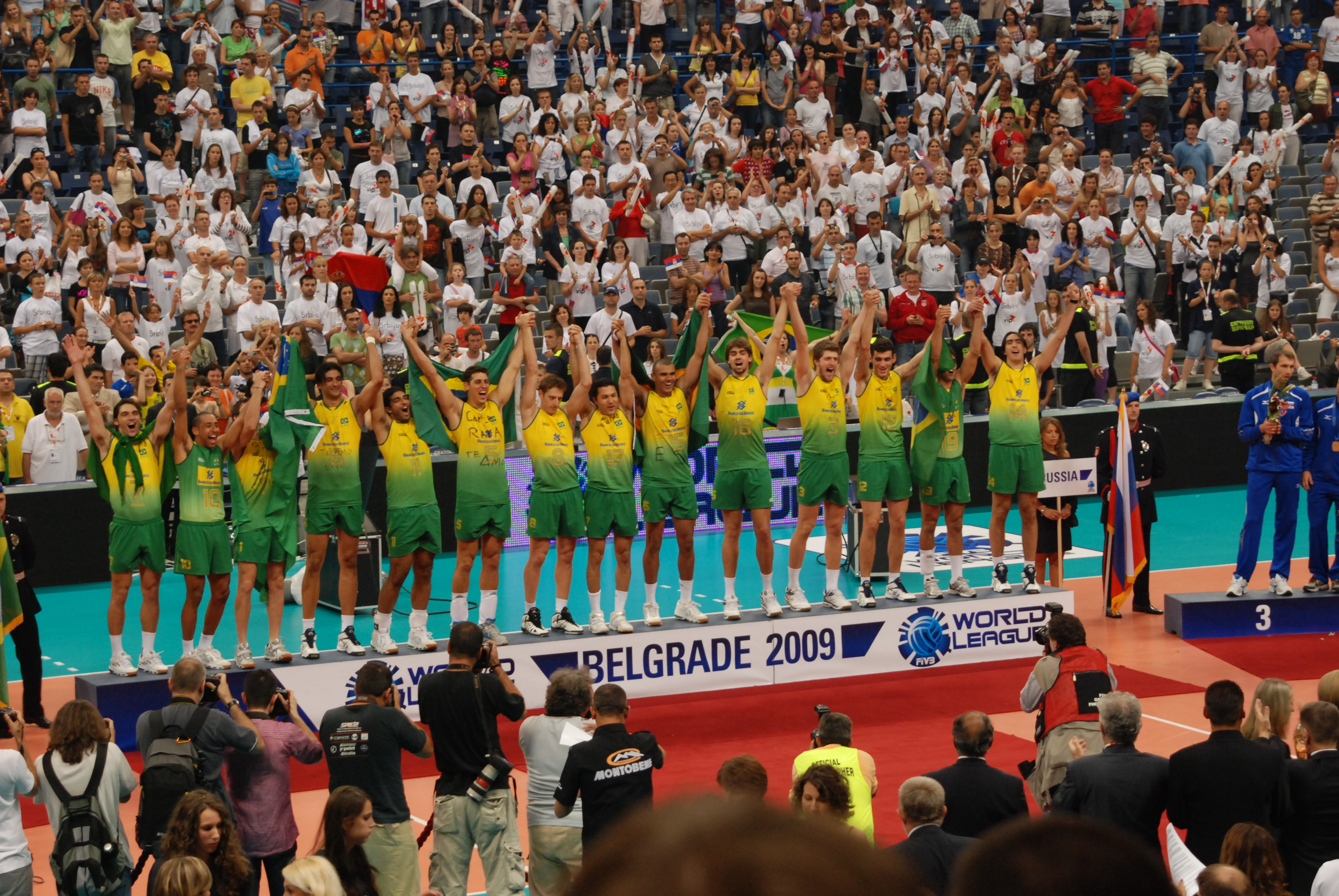
Brazil Champion FIVB World League 2009

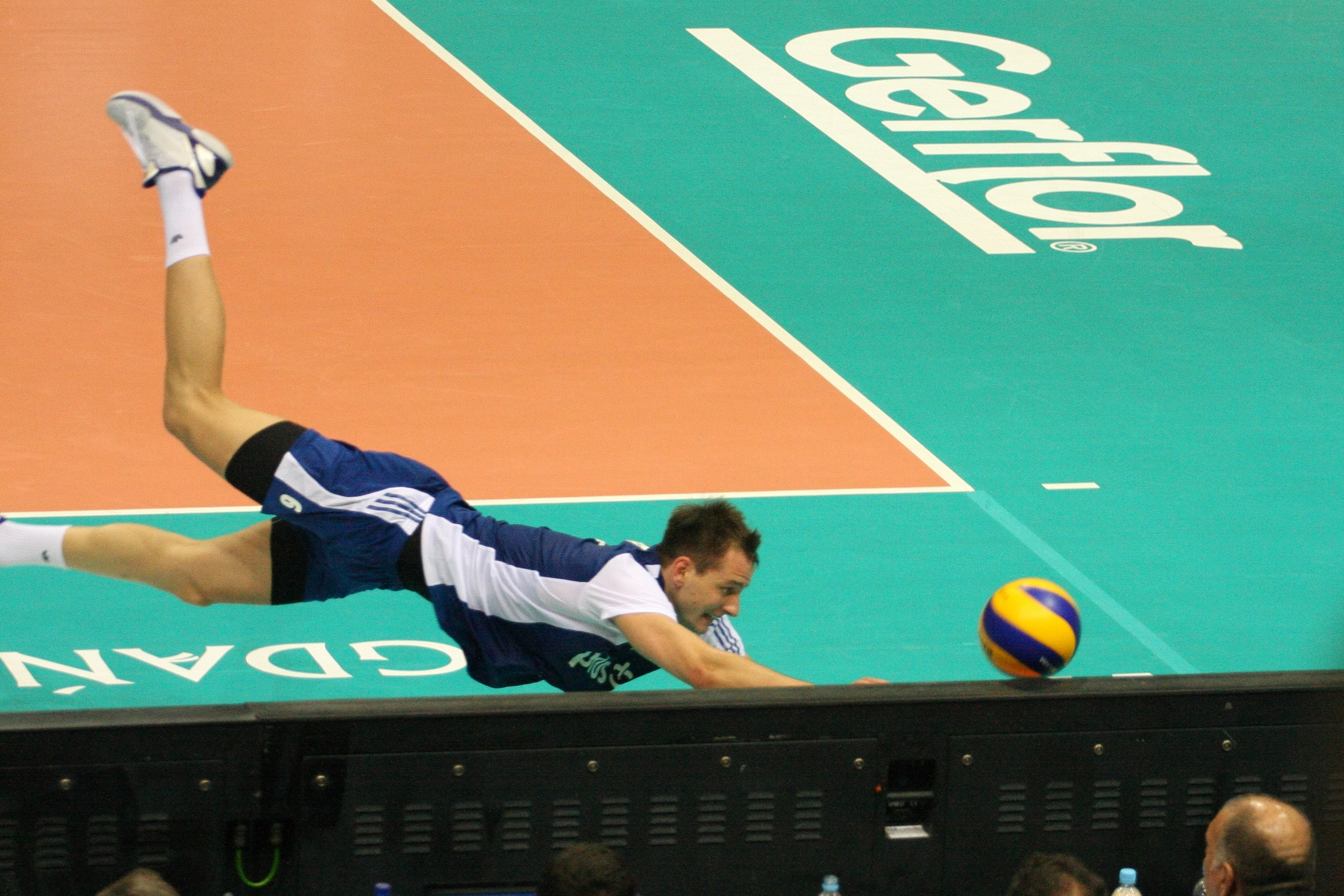
Dive by Bartosz Kurek

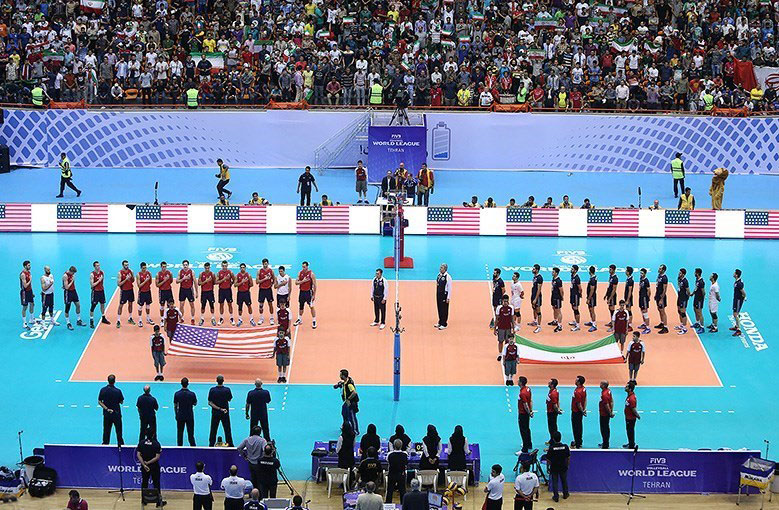
Iran and United States teams in FIVB World League 2015

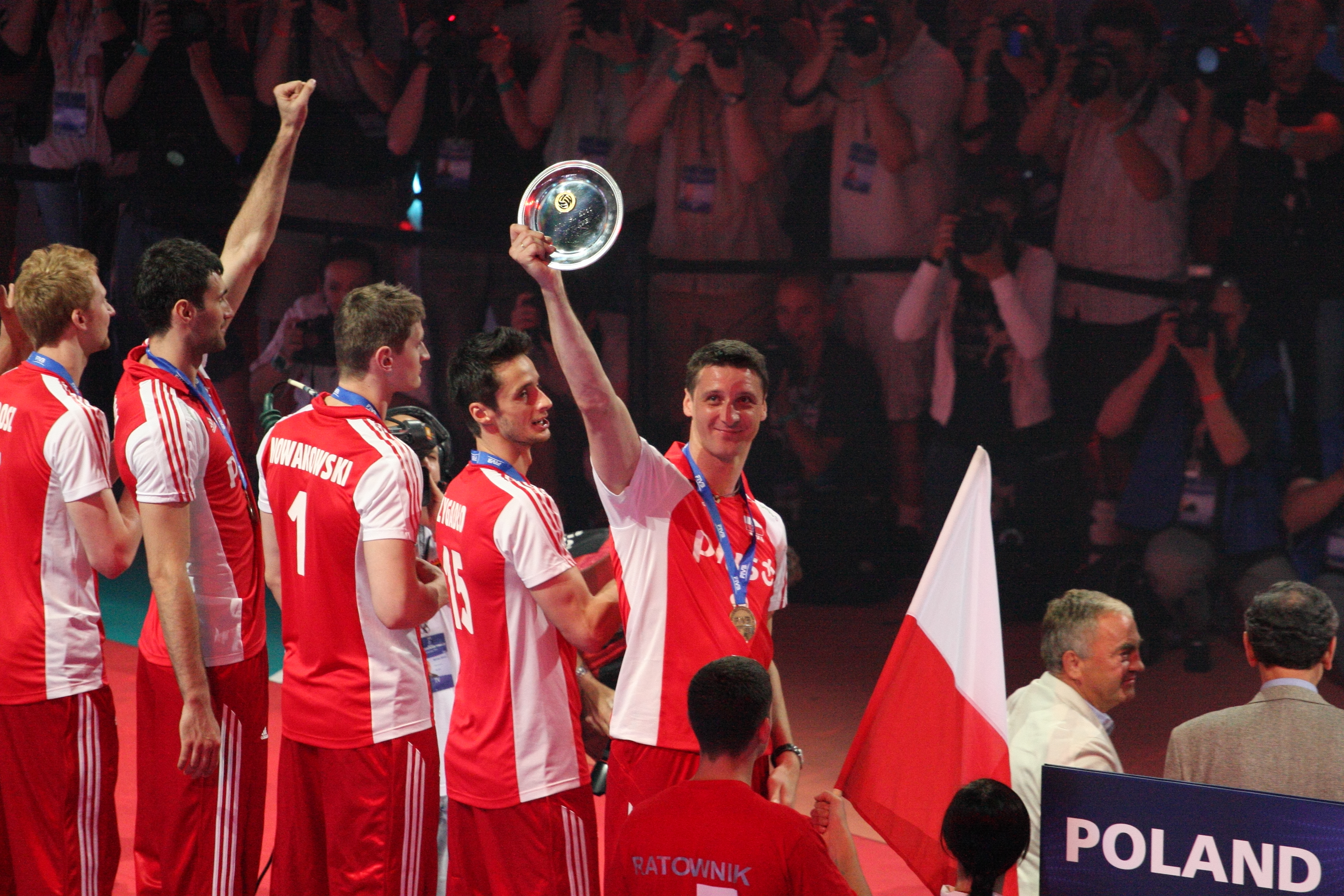
Poland at FIVB World League Final 2011

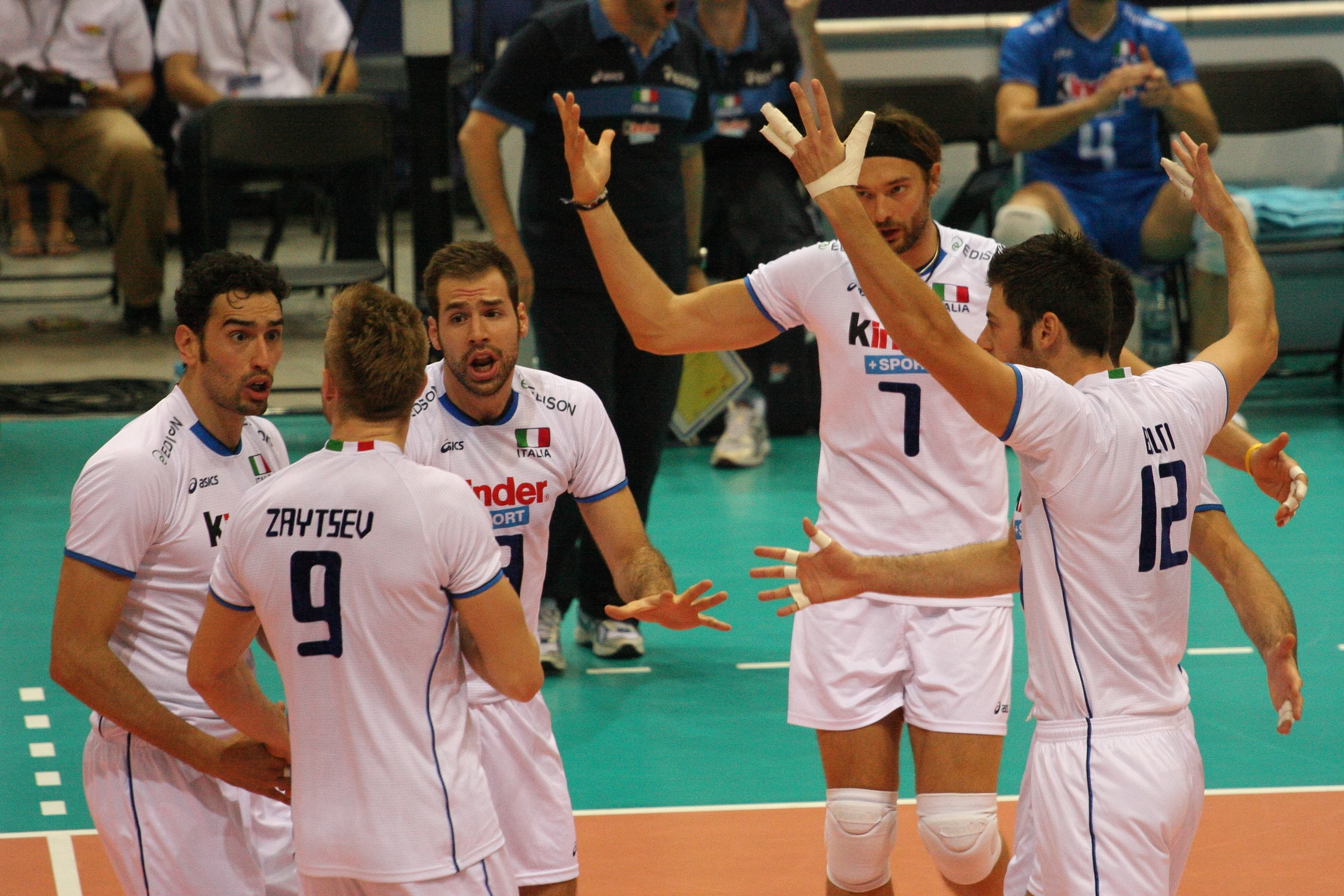
Italian Player in FIVB World League 2012

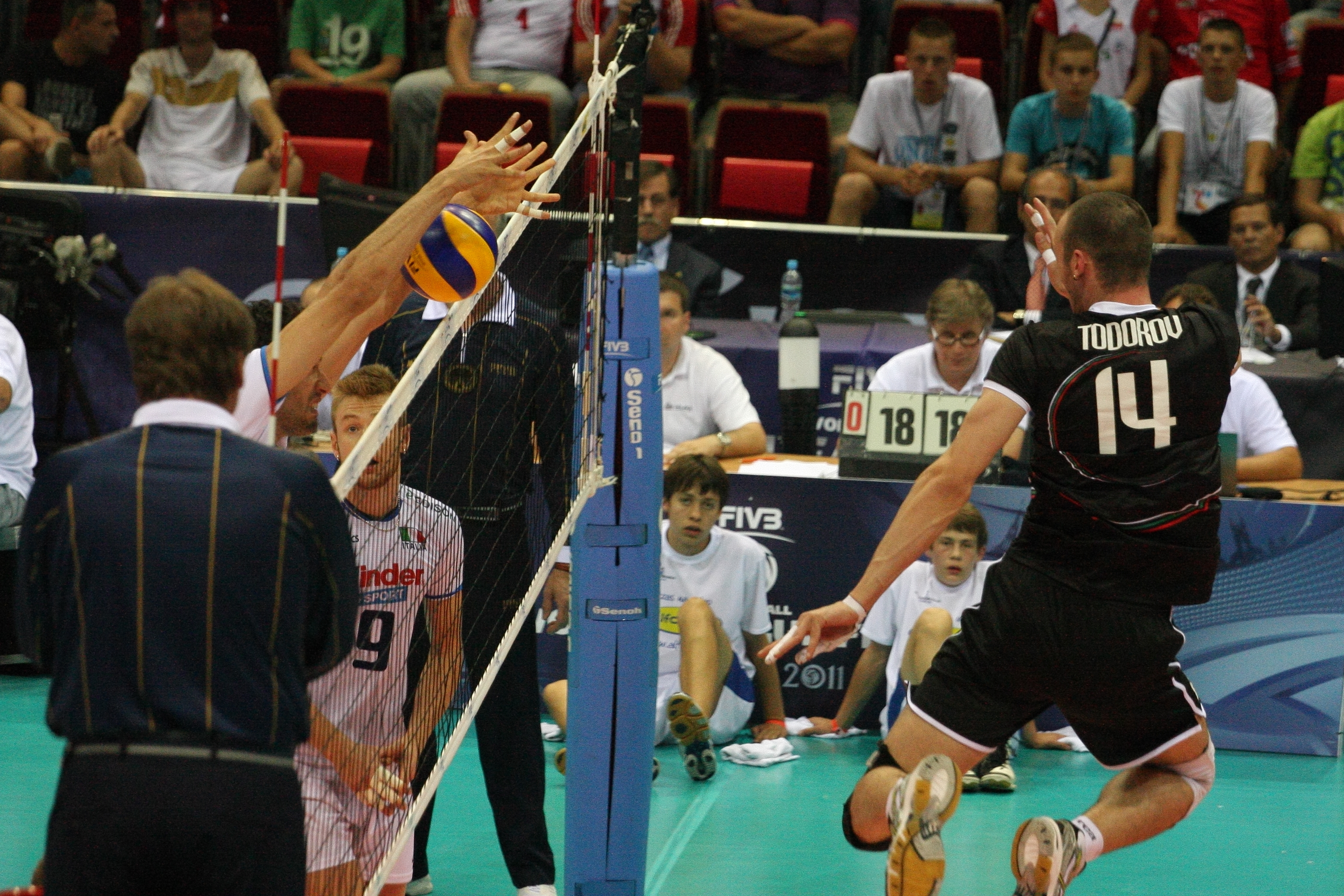
Spike style by Bulgarian Player

== See also ==
- Volleyball at the Summer Olympics
- FIVB Volleyball Men's Nations League
- FIVB Volleyball Men's World Championship
- FIVB Volleyball Men's World Cup
- FIVB Volleyball Men's Challenger Cup
- FIVB Volleyball World Grand Champions Cup
- FIVB Volleyball World Grand Prix
- FIVB Volleyball Women's Nations League
- FIVB Volleyball Women's World Championship
- FIVB Volleyball Women's World Cup
- FIVB Volleyball Women's Challenger Cup
- List of indoor volleyball world medalists
