= 1996 FIVB Volleyball World League =

International volleyball competition

1996 World League
Tournament details
- Host country: Netherlands (Final)
- Dates: 10 May – 29 June
- Teams: 11

Final positions
- Champions: Netherlands (1st title)

Tournament awards
- MVP: (Italy) Lorenzo Bernardi

The 1996 FIVB Volleyball World League was the seventh edition of the annual men's international volleyball tournament, played by 11 countries from 10 May to 29 June 1996. The Final Round was held in Rotterdam, Netherlands.

== Pools composition ==
Pool A	Pool B	Pool C
Argentina; Brazil; Cuba; Spain	Bulgaria; Greece; Italy; Netherlands	China; Japan; Russia

== Intercontinental round ==
=== Pool A ===
Pos	Team	Pld	W	L	Pts	SW	SL	SR	SPW	SPL	SPR	Qualification
1	Brazil	12	10	2	22	34	13	2.615	653	517	1.263	Final round
2	Cuba	12	6	6	18	24	24	1.000	612	591	1.036	Final round
3	Argentina	12	4	8	16	22	26	0.846	562	594	0.946	
4	Spain	12	4	8	16	13	30	0.433	460	585	0.786	

Date		Score		Set 1	Set 2	Set 3	Set 4	Set 5	Total
10 May	Cuba	3–1	Argentina	15–17	15–7	15–4	15–9		60–37
10 May	Spain	0–3	Brazil	13–15	4–15	8–15			25–45
12 May	Cuba	3–1	Argentina	15–6	13–15	15–9	15–12		58–42
12 May	Spain	3–2	Brazil	12–15	15–10	5–15	15–12	15–10	62–62
17 May	Cuba	3–2	Brazil	15–11	12–15	15–6	10–15	15–12	67–59
17 May	Spain	3–2	Argentina	6–15	2–15	15–6	15–11	15–12	53–59
18 May	Cuba	2–3	Brazil	15–11	7–15	14–16	15–13	13–15	64–70
18 May	Spain	0–3	Argentina	5–15	9–15	12–15			26–45
25 May	Cuba	3–0	Spain	15–6	15–13	15–9			45–28
25 May	Argentina	2–3	Brazil	10–15	13–15	15–8	15–12	17–19	70–69
26 May	Cuba	2–3	Spain	15–7	9–15	15–8	13–15	9–15	61–60
26 May	Argentina	1–3	Brazil	15–7	10–15	9–15	8–15		45–52
1 Jun	Brazil	3–1	Argentina	14–16	15–9	15–7	15–4		59–36
1 Jun	Spain	0–3	Cuba	9–15	9–15	16–17			34–47
2 Jun	Brazil	3–0	Argentina	15–7	15–11	15–1			45–19
2 Jun	Spain	3–0	Cuba	15–9	16–14	15–12			46–35
8 Jun	Brazil	3–0	Cuba	15–6	15–12	15–10			45–28
8 Jun	Argentina	3–1	Spain	6–15	15–8	15–11	15–12		51–46
9 Jun	Brazil	3–1	Cuba	15–7	12–15	15–6	15–12		57–40
9 Jun	Argentina	3–0	Spain	15–9	15–5	15–5			45–19
15 Jun	Brazil	3–0	Spain	15–13	15–9	15–10			45–32
15 Jun	Argentina	2–3	Cuba	15–12	10–15	15–6	11–15	11–15	62–63
16 Jun	Brazil	3–0	Spain	15–11	15–10	15–8			45–29
16 Jun	Argentina	3–1	Cuba	15–12	15–7	6–15	15–10		51–44

=== Pool B ===
Pos	Team	Pld	W	L	Pts	SW	SL	SR	SPW	SPL	SPR	Qualification
1	Italy	12	11	1	23	34	10	3.400	609	430	1.416	Final round
2	Netherlands (Note: Qualified as hosts) (H)	12	8	4	20	28	13	2.154	536	412	1.301	Final round
3	Bulgaria	12	4	8	16	17	25	0.680	476	516	0.922	
4	Greece	12	1	11	13	4	35	0.114	308	571	0.539	

(H) Host
Notes:

Date		Score		Set 1	Set 2	Set 3	Set 4	Set 5	Total
10 May	Netherlands	0–3	Italy	8–15	9–15	12–15			29–45
10 May	Bulgaria	3–0	Greece	15–13	15–3	15–4			45–20
12 May	Netherlands	1–3	Italy	15–7	10–15	12–15	13–15		50–52
12 May	Bulgaria	3–0	Greece	15–6	15–11	15–10			45–27
17 May	Italy	3–0	Bulgaria	15–9	15–7	15–5			45–21
17 May	Greece	0–3	Netherlands	4–15	13–15	13–15			30–45
18 May	Italy	3–1	Bulgaria	14–16	15–9	15–11	15–10		59–46
18 May	Greece	1–3	Netherlands	10–15	10–15	15–7	2–15		37–52
25 May	Bulgaria	0–3	Netherlands	8–15	11–15	10–15			29–45
25 May	Greece	0–3	Italy	4–15	7–15	11–15			22–45
26 May	Bulgaria	0–3	Netherlands	12–15	8–15	9–15			29–45
26 May	Greece	0–3	Italy	10–15	11–15	8–15			29–45
1 Jun	Netherlands	3–0	Greece	15–4	15–2	15–6			45–12
1 Jun	Bulgaria	3–1	Italy	15–11	15–1	13–15	15–12		58–39
2 Jun	Netherlands	3–0	Greece	15–12	15–4	15–6			45–22
2 Jun	Bulgaria	2–3	Italy	5–15	6–15	15–11	15–12	13–15	54–68
8 Jun	Italy	3–1	Netherlands	15–4	12–15	15–10	15–2		57–31
8 Jun	Greece	3–2	Bulgaria	10–15	10–15	15–7	15–7	27–25	67–69
9 Jun	Italy	3–2	Netherlands	13–15	16–14	15–3	5–15	15–12	64–59
9 Jun	Greece	0–3	Bulgaria	6–15	3–15	2–15			11–45
15 Jun	Italy	3–0	Greece	15–6	15–3	15–6			45–15
15 Jun	Netherlands	3–0	Bulgaria	15–6	15–4	15–7			45–17
16 Jun	Italy	3–0	Greece	15–5	15–8	15–3			45–16
16 Jun	Netherlands	3–0	Bulgaria	15–9	15–3	15–6			45–18

=== Pool C ===
Pos	Team	Pld	W	L	Pts	SW	SL	SR	SPW	SPL	SPR	Qualification
1	Russia	12	12	0	24	36	7	5.143	625	423	1.478	Final round
2	China	12	3	9	15	17	31	0.548	525	637	0.824	Final round
3	Japan	12	3	9	15	16	31	0.516	522	612	0.853	

Date		Score		Set 1	Set 2	Set 3	Set 4	Set 5	Total
10 May	China	2–3	Japan	15–10	13–15	16–14	6–15	13–15	63–69
11 May	Russia	3–2	Japan	15–7	12–15	12–15	15–7	20–18	74–62
12 May	China	0–3	Russia	8–15	7–15	9–15			24–45
17 May	Russia	3–0	Japan	17–15	15–6	15–2			47–23
18 May	Japan	3–1	China	11–15	15–8	15–3	15–7		56–33
19 May	Russia	3–1	China	16–14	12–15	15–7	15–9		58–45
24 May	Russia	3–0	China	15–12	15–7	15–8			45–27
25 May	Japan	3–1	China	11–15	15–12	15–4	15–4		56–35
26 May	Japan	0–3	Russia	14–16	10–15	7–15			31–46
31 May	China	0–3	Russia	13–15	6–15	11–15			30–45
1 Jun	Russia	3–0	Japan	15–11	15–6	15–4			45–21
2 Jun	China	3–0	Japan	15–5	15–6	15–4			45–15
7 Jun	Russia	3–1	China	15–11	15–9	13–15	15–3		58–38
8 Jun	China	3–2	Japan	15–13	13–15	15–6	7–15	15–5	65–54
9 Jun	Russia	3–0	Japan	16–14	15–11	15–2			46–27
14 Jun	Russia	3–2	China	9–15	15–11	15–5	10–15	15–13	64–59
15 Jun	Japan	2–3	China	13–15	16–17	15–11	15–3	13–15	72–61
16 Jun	Japan	1–3	Russia	6–15	15–6	14–16	1–15		36–52

== Final round ==
- Venue: Rotterdam Ahoy, Rotterdam, Netherlands

=== Pool play ===
- Teams from the same pool of Intercontinental Round will not play.

Pos	Team	Pld	W	L	Pts	SW	SL	SR	SPW	SPL	SPR	Qualification
1	Netherlands	4	4	0	8	12	2	6.000	202	128	1.578	Final
2	Italy	4	3	1	7	9	6	1.500	208	170	1.224	Final
3	Russia	4	2	2	6	8	8	1.000	188	207	0.908	3rd place match
4	Cuba	4	1	3	5	6	9	0.667	164	178	0.921	3rd place match
5	Brazil	4	1	3	5	5	9	0.556	172	183	0.940	
6	China	4	1	3	5	3	9	0.333	108	176	0.614	

Date		Score		Set 1	Set 2	Set 3	Set 4	Set 5	Total
24 Jun	Italy	3–1	Brazil	15–9	15–9	11–15	15–10		56–43
24 Jun	Russia	3–2	Cuba	4–15	15–6	15–7	7–15	15–13	56–56
24 Jun	Netherlands	3–0	China	15–4	15–7	15–3			45–14
25 Jun	Italy	3–0	Cuba	15–10	15–3	15–6			45–19
25 Jun	Brazil	3–0	China	15–4	15–9	16–14			46–27
25 Jun	Netherlands	3–0	Russia	15–9	15–2	16–14			46–25
27 Jun	Italy	3–2	Russia	10–15	10–15	16–14	15–4	16–14	67–62
27 Jun	Cuba	3–0	China	15–10	15–7	15–4			45–21
27 Jun	Netherlands	3–1	Brazil	15–12	15–9	10–15	15–9		55–45
28 Jun	China	3–0	Italy	15–13	16–14	15–13			46–40
28 Jun	Russia	3–0	Brazil	15–13	15–12	15–13			45–38
28 Jun	Netherlands	3–1	Cuba	11–15	15–10	15–8	15–11		56–44

=== Finals ===
==== 3rd place match ====
Date		Score		Set 1	Set 2	Set 3	Set 4	Set 5	Total
29 Jun	Russia	3–2	Cuba	3–15	15–7	4–15	16–14	19–17	57–68

==== Final ====
Date		Score		Set 1	Set 2	Set 3	Set 4	Set 5	Total
29 Jun	Netherlands	3–2	Italy	17–15	15–12	10–15	10–15	22–20	74–77

== Final standing ==
Rank	Team
1st place, gold medalist(s)	Netherlands
2nd place, silver medalist(s)	Italy
3rd place, bronze medalist(s)	Russia
4	Cuba
5	Brazil
6	China
7	Argentina
8	Bulgaria
9	Japan
10	Spain
11	Greece

1996 World League champions

Netherlands
1st title

== Awards ==
- Most valuable player
  - (Italy) Lorenzo Bernardi
- Best scorer
  - (Italy) Lorenzo Bernardi
- Best spiker
  - (Russia) Stanislav Dineykin
- Best server
  - (Cuba) Alain Roca
- Best blocker
  - (Cuba) Ihosvany Hernández
