= Dragan Kobiljski =

Serbian volleyball player and coach

Personal information
- Nationality: Serbian
- Born: 9 August 1971 (age 55); Belgrade, SR Serbia, Yugoslavia
- Height: 2.00 m (6 ft 7 in)

Coaching information
- Current team: Partizan
Previous teams coached
Years	Teams
2008–2009; 2009–2010; 2010–2012; 2014–2019; 2016; 2017–2020; 2020–2021; 2022; 2022–2023; 2023–2024; 2024–2025; 2025–present	Borac Starčevo; Partizan (assistant); ACH Volley (assistant); Crvena zvezda Serbia NT (assistant); Iran NT (assistant); Radnički Kragujevac; Serbia NT (assistant); SCM Zalău; Rapid București; Partizan; ACH Volley (assistant)

Volleyball information
- Position: Middle blocker

Career
Years	Teams
1990–1997	Partizan
1997–2001	Rennes Volley 35
2001–2003	Budućnost
2003–2004	GFC Ajaccio VB
2004–2006	Spacer's Toulouse Volley
2006–2008	GFC Ajaccio VB
Honours
Men's volleyball
Assistant coach for Iran
AVC Asian Championship
Gold medal – first place	2019 Iran	Team
Asian Games
Gold medal – first place	2018 Indonesia	Team
FIVB World Grand Champions Cup
Bronze medal – third place	2017 Japan	Team
Assistant coach for Serbia
FIVB World League
Gold medal – first place	2016 Kraków	Team
- Last updated: 13 May 2023

Dragan Kobiljski (Serbian Cyrillic: Драган Кобиљски; born 9 August 1971) is a Serbian professional volleyball coach and former player, who is currently serving as assistant coach of ACH Volley of the Slovenian League.

== Playing career ==
A middle blocker, Kobiljski started his professional career in 1994. During his playing days, he played for Partizan, Rennes Volley 35, Budućnost, GFC Ajaccio VB, and Spacer's Toulouse Volley. He retired as a player with GFC Ajaccio VB in 2008.

== Coaching career ==
After retirement in 2008, Kobiljski joined Borac Starčevo as their head coach. After one season, Partizan added him to their coaching staff as an assistant coach for the 2009–10 season.

On 26 May 2010, Kobiljski was added as an assistant coach of the Slovenian team ACH Volley under Igor Kolaković. He parted ways with ACH Volley in 2012.

On 20 May 2014, Crvena zvezda hired Kobiljski as their new head coach. On 25 February 2019, Crvena zvezda parted ways with him.

On 29 January 2020, Radnički Kragujevac hired Kobiljski as their new head coach. On 22 November 2021, Radnički parted ways with him. In September 2022, Romanian SCM Zalău hired Kobiljski as their new head coach.

== National team coaching career ==
From 2011 to 2013, Kobiljski was an assistant coach for the Qatar national team.

In 2016, Kobiljski was named an assistant coach for the Serbia national team under Nikola Grbić. He won a gold medal at the 2016 FIVB Volleyball World League in Kraków, Poland.

On 13 March 2017, Kobiljski was named an assistant coach for the Iran national volleyball team under Igor Kolaković. He won two gold medals, at 2018 Asian Games in Indonesia and at the 2019 Asian Men's Volleyball Championship in Iran, as well as a bronze medal at the 2017 FIVB Volleyball Men's World Grand Champions Cup in Japan.

In April 2022, Kobiljski was named an assistant coach for the Serbia national team under Igor Kolaković.

== Career achievements ==
As player

- Yugoslav Volleyball Championship champion: 1 (with Partizan: 1990–91)
- Yugoslav Volleyball Championship runner-up: 1 (with Partizan: 1991–92)
- Yugoslav Volleyball Cup winner: 1 (with Partizan: 1990–91)
- Serbia-Montenegro League champion: 1 (with Budućnost: 2001–02)
- French Ligue B champion: 1 (with Spacer's Toulouse Volley: 2004–05)
- French Ligue B runner-up: 3 (with Rennes Volley 35: 1999–2000, 2000–01; with GFC Ajaccio VB: 2006–07)
- Yugoslav League runner-up: 1 (with Partizan: 1995–96)
- Yugoslav Cup runner-up: 3 (with Partizan: 1994–95, 1995–96, 1996–97)
- Serbia-Montenegro Cup runner-up: 1 (with Budućnost: 2002–03)

As head coach

- Serbian League champion: 2 (with Crvena zvezda: 2014–15, 2015–16)
- Serbian League runner-up: 1 (with Crvena zvezda: 2016–17)
- Serbian Cup winner: 1 (with Crvena zvezda: 2015–16)
- Serbian Cup runner-up: 1 (with Crvena zvezda: 2017–18)
- Serbian Super Cup winner: 2 (with Crvena zvezda: 2014, 2016)
- Serbian Super Cup runner-up: 1 (with Crvena zvezda: 2015)
- Romanian Cup winner: 1 (with Rapid București: 2023–24)

As assistant coach

- Slovenian League champion: 2 (with ACH Volley: 2010–11, 2011–12)
- Slovenian Cup winner: 2 (with ACH Volley: 2010–11, 2011–12)
- Middle European League champion: 1 (with ACH Volley: 2010–11)
- Middle European League runner-up: 1 (with ACH Volley: 2011–12)
- FIVB World League champion: 1 (with Serbia: 2016)
- AVC Asian Championship champion: 1 (with Iran: 2019)
- Asian Games champion: 1 (with Iran: 2018)
- FIVB World Grand Champions Cup bronze: 1 (with Iran: 2017)

== Personal life ==
His 13-year-old daughter Ema Kobiljski was killed in the Belgrade school shooting on 3 May 2023 along with 8 other students and a security guard. The head coach of the Croatian team Mladost, Ratko Peris, dedicated the Croatian title to Kobiljski's daughter, after his team won the Croatian 1A Volleyball League for the 2022–23 season.
