= Lazar Koprivica =

Serbian volleyball player (born 1991)

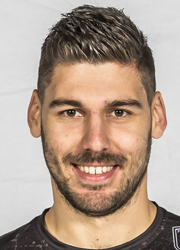

Personal information
- Nationality: Serbian
- Born: 8 November 1991 (age 34)

Volleyball information
- Position: right side hitter
- Number: 4 (national team)

Career
Years	Teams
2009–2015	(Serbia) OK Crvena Zvezda
2015–2016	(France) Rennes Volley 35
2016	(Greece) Iraklis Thessaloniki V.C.
2016–present	(Romania) SCM U Craiova

National team
2015	Serbia
Honours
Men's volleyball
Representing Serbia
World U23 Championship
Silver medal – second place	2013 Brazil

Lazar Koprivica (born 8 November 1991) is a Serbian male volleyball player. He played for his home club OK Crvena Zvezda Belgrade from 2009 to 2015, winning four championship titles. He continued his international career in France at Rennes Volley 35 (2015/16), in Greece at Iraklis Thessaloniki V.C. (2016) and in Romania at SCM U Craiova (2017).

As a junior, Koprivica played for various selections of the national team, and won bronze medals at both the 2010 European Junior Championship and the 2011 World Junior Championship, and a silver at the 2013 U-24 championship in Brazil. With the B-section of the Serbia men's national volleyball team he competed at the 2015 European Games in Baku.

== See also ==
- Serbia at the 2015 European Games
