= First Kragujevac Gymnasium =

Coordinates: 44.010472°N 20.911159°E

The First Grammar School of Kragujevac
- Прва крагујевачка гимназија Prva kragujevačka gimnazija
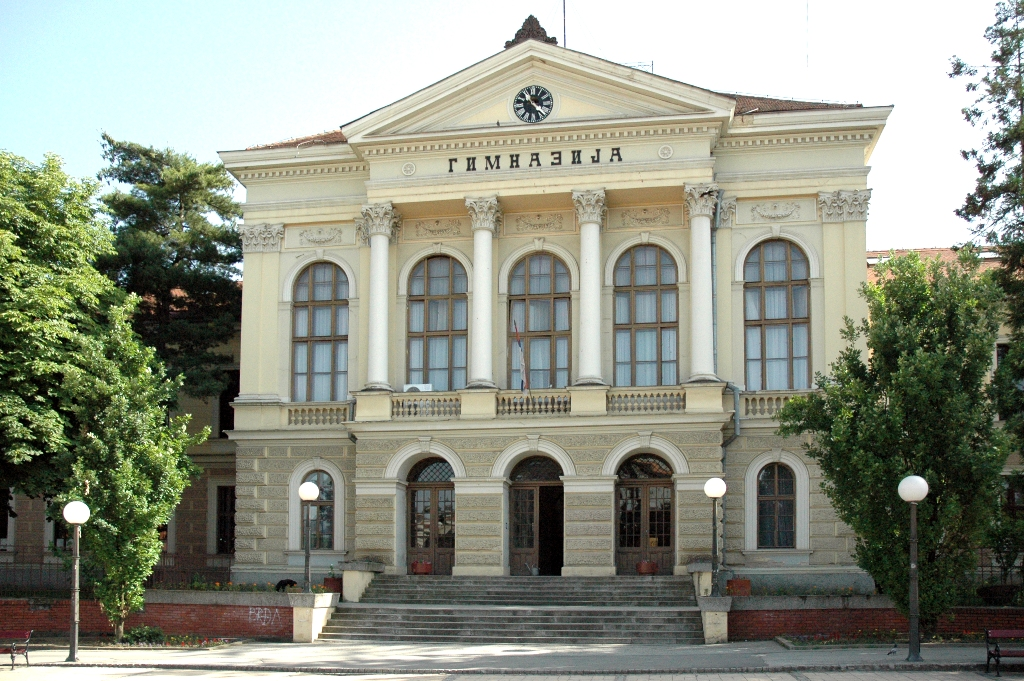

Location
- Daničićeva 1 Kragujevac; Serbia

Information
- Type: Public secondary (high school)
- Established: 1833; 193 years ago
- Grades: 4
- Enrollment: approx. 1,200

The First Grammar School of Kragujevac (Serbian: Прва крагујевачка гимназија, Prva kragujevačka gimnazija) is a high school located in Kragujevac, Serbia. Founded in 1833, the school is the oldest Serbian high school south of the Sava - Danube line.

== Studying profiles ==
The school comprises three educational tracks:

- Scientific (chemistry, math, physics, biology)
- Social Studies and Language (history, Serbian, Latin, German, English, French)
- Mathematics - Special (for gifted students - Mathematics and Informatics)

== Notable alumni ==
- Radoje Domanović
- Jovan Ristić
- Gorica Popović
- Jelena Tomašević
- Marija Šerifović
- Aleksandar Gigović
