= Aleksandar Mitrović (disambiguation) =

Aleksandar Mitrović (born 1994) is a Serbian footballer.

Aleksandar Mitrović may also refer to:

- Aleksandar Mitrović (politician) (1933–2012), Serbian politician
- Aleksandar Mitrović (volleyball) (born 1982), Serbian volleyball player
- Aleksandar Mitrović (basketball) (born 1990), Serbian basketball player
