= Vladan Đorđević (volleyball) =

Serbian volleyball player

Personal information
- Full name: Vladan Đorđević
- Born: January 10, 1983 (age 43) Ćuprija, SR Serbia, Yugoslavia
- Height: 1.95 m (6 ft 5 in)
- Weight: 93 kg (205 lb)
- Spike: 345 cm (136 in)
- Block: 330 cm (130 in)

Volleyball information
- Position: Outside hitter
- Number: 8

National team
- Years: Team
- –: Serbia
Honours
Men's volleyball
Representing Serbia and Montenegro
World League
| Silver medal – second place | 2005 Belgrade | Team |

Vladan Đorđević (Serbian: Владан Ђорђевић born January 10, 1983, in Ćuprija, SR Serbia, Yugoslavia) is a Serbian volleyball player (outside hitter). He started playing volleyball in OK Morava. He played 75 matches for the junior national team and 60 matches for the senior national team. He was a member of the national team representing Serbia and Montenegro at the 2004 Summer Olympics in Athens.

== Career ==
- 1995–1998 (Federal Republic of Yugoslavia) OK Morava
- 1998–2004 (Federal Republic of Yugoslavia) OK Partizan
- 2004–2005 (Austria) HotVolley's
- 2005 (Greece) Nikea
- 2006 (Greece) Pagrati
- 2006-2007 (Turkey) Galatasaray
- 2007–2008 (Turkey) SGK Voleybol İhtisas Kulübü
- 2008–2009 (Serbia) OK Ribnica
- 2009–2010 (Serbia) OK Partizan
- 2010–2011 (United Arab Emirates) Baniyas – Abu Dhabi
- 2011–2012 (Serbia) OK Radnički Kragujevac
- 2012–2013 (Serbia) OK Jagodina
- 2013—2015 (Cyprus) Anagennisi Deryneias
- 2015-2016 (Cyprus) APOEL
- 2016 (Slovenia) Pomgrad Murska Sobota
- 2017 (Albania) Vllaznia Skodra
- 2017-2018 (Serbia) OK Spartak Ljig
- 2018 (Bosnia and Herzegovina) OK Mladost Brčko
- 2019 (Albania) Partizani Tirana
- 2019-2020 (Serbia) OK Partizan
