= Milan Vasić (volleyball) =

Serbian volleyball player

Personal information
- Full name: Milan Vasić
- Born: September 2, 1980 (age 46); Belgrade, SR Serbia, Yugoslavia
- Height: 2.04 m (6 ft 8 in)
- Weight: 98 kg (216 lb)
- Spike: 335 cm (132 in)
- Block: 330 cm (130 in)

Volleyball information
- Position: Diagonal
- Current club: (Switzerland) LUC Volleyball

National team
Serbia
Honours
Men's volleyball
Representing Serbia and Montenegro
World League
Silver medal – second place	2003 Madrid	Team
Bronze medal – third place	2004 Rome	Team
Mediterranean Games
Bronze medal – third place	2005 Almería	Team

Milan Vasić (Serbian: Милан Васић) (born September 2, 1980, in Belgrade, SR Serbia, Yugoslavia) is a Serbian volleyball player. He started playing volleyball in OK Crvena Zvezda. He played 43 games for the national team. He was a member of the national team representing Serbia and Montenegro at the 2004 Summer Olympics in Athens.

== Career ==
- 1998-03 (Federal Republic of Yugoslavia) OK Crvena Zvezda
- 2003-04 (Turkey) Fenerbahçe
- 2004-05 (Spain) CV Almería
- 2005-06 (Greece) A.C. Orestias
- 2006-07 played in Japan
- 2007-08 (Germany) Berlin
- 2008-09 (Bulgaria) Metalurg
- 2009-10 (Poland) ASSECO Resovia Rzeszów
- 2010-11 played in Iran
- 2011-12 played in Turkey
- 2012–13 (Switzerland) LUC Volleyball
- 2013–14 (Romania) Dinamo București
