= Maksim Buculjević =

Serbian volleyball player (born 1991)

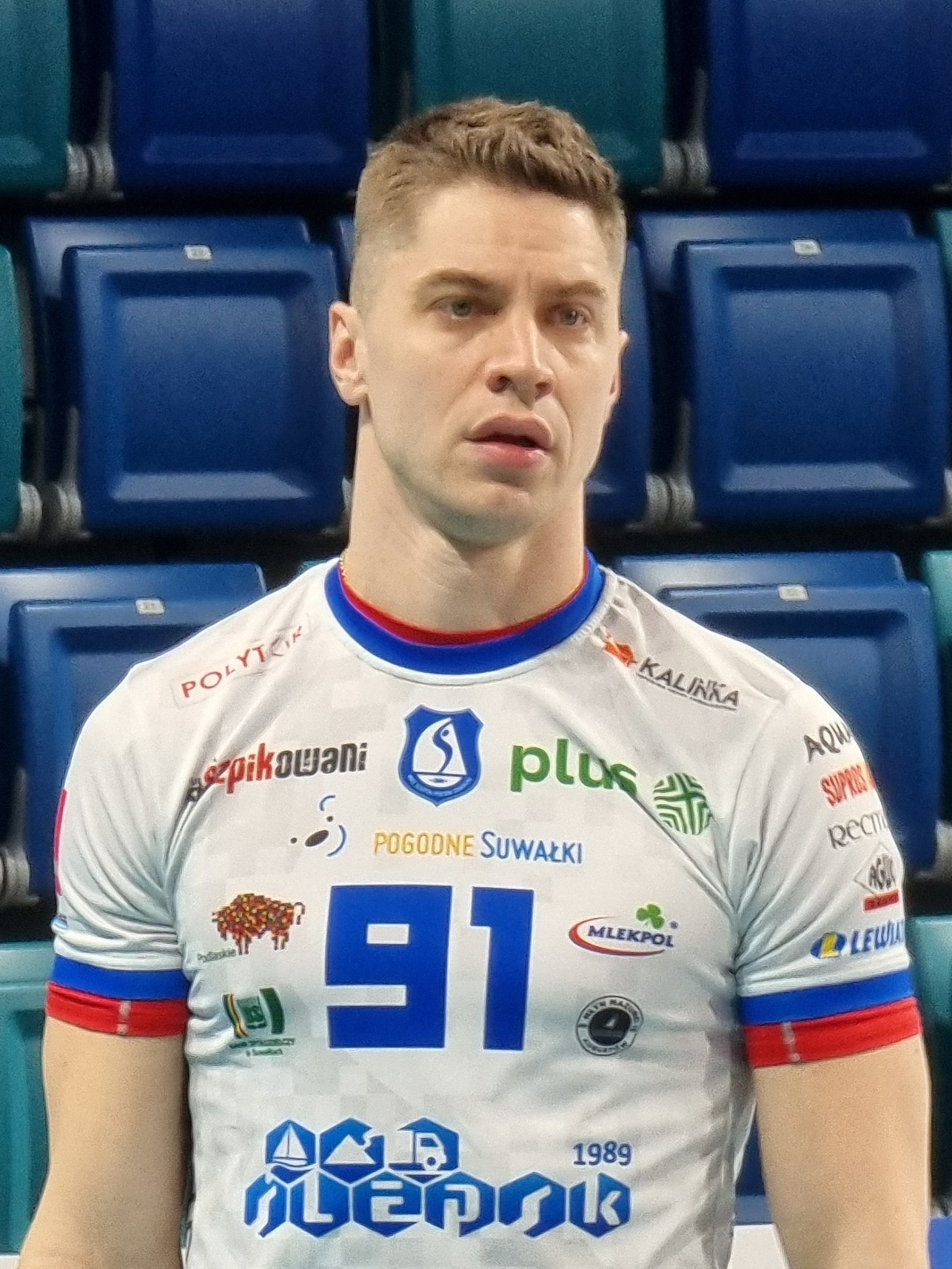
- Maksim Buculjević in 2024

Personal information
- Nationality: Serbian
- Born: 20 September 1991 (age 35); Novi Sad, SR Serbia, SFR Yugoslavia
- Height: 1.92 m (6 ft 4 in)
- Weight: 83 kg (183 lb)
- Spike: 320 cm (126 in)
- Block: 310 cm (122 in)

Volleyball information
- Position: Setter

Career
Years	Teams
2011–2016; 2016–2017; 2017–2018; 2018; 2018–2019; 2019–2020; 2020–2022; 2022–2023; 2023–2024	OK Crvena Zvezda; ACH Volley; Hurrikaani Loimaa; Jeopark Kula Belediyespor; United Volleys Frankfurt; Foinikas Syros; Altekma SK; OK Vojvodina; Ślepsk Suwałki

National team
2015–	Serbia
Honours
Men's volleyball
Representing Serbia
CEV European Championship
Bronze medal – third place	2017 Poland

Maksim Buculjević (Serbian Cyrillic: Максим Буцуљевић; born 20 September 1991) is a Serbian professional volleyball player. He is a former member of the Serbia national team.

== Honours ==
=== Club ===
- Domestic
  - 2011–12 Serbian SuperCup, with OK Crvena Zvezda
  - 2011–12 Serbian Championship, with OK Crvena Zvezda
  - 2012–13 Serbian SuperCup, with OK Crvena Zvezda
  - 2012–13 Serbian Cup, with OK Crvena Zvezda
  - 2012–13 Serbian Championship, with OK Crvena Zvezda
  - 2013–14 Serbian SuperCup, with OK Crvena Zvezda
  - 2013–14 Serbian Cup, with OK Crvena Zvezda
  - 2013–14 Serbian Championship, with OK Crvena Zvezda
  - 2014–15 Serbian SuperCup, with OK Crvena Zvezda
  - 2014–15 Serbian Championship, with OK Crvena Zvezda
  - 2015–16 Serbian Cup, with OK Crvena Zvezda
  - 2015–16 Serbian Championship, with OK Crvena Zvezda
  - 2015–16 Serbian SuperCup, with OK Crvena Zvezda
  - 2016–17 Slovenian Championship, with ACH Volley

=== Youth national team ===
- 2009 CEV U19 European Championship
- 2009 FIVB U19 World Championship
