= OK Karađorđe =

Serbian volleyball club

OK Karađorđe Topola
- Full name: Odbojkaški klub Karađorđe
- Founded: 1964
- Ground: Sports Hall OŠ "Karađorđe" Topola (Capacity: 200)
- Manager: Neven Majstorović
- League: Serbian SuperLeague

Uniforms
Home	Away

OK Karađorđe Topola (Serbian Cyrillic: Одбојкашки клуб Карађорђе) is a Serbian volleyball club based in Topola, Serbia.

The club was founded in 1964 and currently competes in the Serbian SuperLeague, the top tier of volleyball in Serbia. The team plays its home matches at the Sports Hall of the Elementary School "Karađorđe" in Topola.
