= OK Partizan =

Serbian volleyball club from Belgrade

Odbojkaški klub Partizan
- Full name: Odbojkaški klub Partizan
- Short name: OK Partizan
- Nickname: Crno-beli (The Black & Whites)
- Founded: 1946; 80 years ago
- Ground: Aleksandar Nikolić Hall (Capacity: 8,000)
- Chairman: Željko Tanasković
- Manager: Bojan Janić
- Captain: Milija Mrdak
- League: CEV Champions League; Serbian Volleyball League

Uniforms
Home	Away

Odbojkaški klub Partizan (English: Volleyball club Partizan) commonly known as OK Partizan, is a volleyball club from Belgrade, Serbia. OK Partizan is a part of JSD Partizan. The club formed in 1946. In its history, Partizan won 12 national championships, 9 cups and 1 supercup. The women's club formed in 1950. In its history, it won 9 national championships, 2 cups and 2 supercups. The female team ceased to exist in 1972. but was re-established in 2016.

One of the best volleyball players in the world, Ivan Miljković, started his professional career with OK Partizan.

== Honours and achievements ==
National Championship – 12

- Yugoslav Volleyball Championship :
  - Winners (10) : 1946, 1947, 1949, 1950, 1953, 1967, 1972–73, 1977–78, 1989–90, 1990–91
  - Runners-up (11): 1948, 1966, 1968, 1969, 1971, 1972, 1973–74, 1976–77, 1978–89, 1983–84, 1988–89
- Volleyball League of FR Yugoslavia:
  - Runners-up (2): 1992–92, 1995–96
- Serbian Volleyball League :
  - Winners (2) : 2010–11, 2022–23
  - Runners-up (3): 2012–13, 2014–15, 2020–21

National Cup – 9

- Yugoslav Volleyball Cup :
  - Winners (7) : 1950, 1960–61, 1963–64, 1971, 1974, 1989, 1990
  - Runners-up (6): 1972, 1975, 1976–77, 1977–78, 1982, 1984
- FR Yugoslavia Volleyball Cup :
  - Runners-up (5): 1993–94, 1994–95, 1995–96, 1996–97, 1999–2000
- Serbian Volleyball Cup :
  - Winners (2) : 2021–22, 2022–23.
  - Runners-up (3): 2010–11, 2014–15, 2019–20

National Super Cup – 1

- Serbian Volleyball Supercup :
  - Winners (1) : 2022
  - Runners-up (3): 2011, 2020, 2023

International

- CEV Challenge Cup:
  - Runners-up (2): 1984–85, 1989/90
- BVA Cup:
  - Runners-up (1): 2012

== First Team for 2021/2022 season ==
Number	Name	Nationality
1	Aleksa Mandić	?
3	ignjat Dupuđ	?
6	Lazar Marinović	?
7	Filip Lekić	?
8	Nikola Petrović	?
9	Andrej Huzerjović	?
10	Milutin Nejić	?
11	Stefan Janković	?
12	Lazar Stašević	?
13	Aleksa Mladenović	?
14	Vidak Cvetković	?
15	Dušan Petrović	?
18	Novica Bjelica	?
22	Nathan Gregory Delguidice	?
44	Marko Nikolić	?

Coach : Bojan Janić Serbia

Assistant Coach : Nenad Živanović

== Notable former players ==
- (Socialist Federal Republic of Yugoslavia) Mihajlo Marković
- (Socialist Federal Republic of Yugoslavia) Jovan Janković
- (Socialist Federal Republic of Yugoslavia) Dragomir Popović
- (Socialist Federal Republic of Yugoslavia) Zlatko Kovačević
- (Socialist Federal Republic of Yugoslavia) Borivoje Jovanović
- (Socialist Federal Republic of Yugoslavia) Predrag Okrajnov
- (Socialist Federal Republic of Yugoslavia) Branko Nedić
- (Socialist Federal Republic of Yugoslavia) Sava Dedijer
- (Socialist Federal Republic of Yugoslavia) Danilo Soldatović
- (Socialist Federal Republic of Yugoslavia) Ivan Trinaestić
- (Socialist Federal Republic of Yugoslavia) Vasilije Krestić
- (Socialist Federal Republic of Yugoslavia) Miroslav Vorgić
- (Socialist Federal Republic of Yugoslavia) Marko Pavlović
- (Socialist Federal Republic of Yugoslavia) Zoran Živković
- (Socialist Federal Republic of Yugoslavia) Ratomir Pavlović
- (Socialist Federal Republic of Yugoslavia) Zoran Petrović
- (Socialist Federal Republic of Yugoslavia) Sveta Petrović
- (Socialist Federal Republic of Yugoslavia) Nenad Golijanin
- (Socialist Federal Republic of Yugoslavia) Radoslav Karaklajić
- (Socialist Federal Republic of Yugoslavia) Petar Stanišić
- (Socialist Federal Republic of Yugoslavia) Dragan Rajačić
- (Socialist Federal Republic of Yugoslavia) Branko Draganić
- (Socialist Federal Republic of Yugoslavia) Mate Piljić
- (Socialist Federal Republic of Yugoslavia) Uroš Ribarić
- (Socialist Federal Republic of Yugoslavia) Milovan Simić
- (Socialist Federal Republic of Yugoslavia) Dragan Balandžić
- (Socialist Federal Republic of Yugoslavia) Slavko Balandžić
- (Socialist Federal Republic of Yugoslavia) Goran Šiljegović
- (Socialist Federal Republic of Yugoslavia) Miodrag Stanimirović
- (Socialist Federal Republic of Yugoslavia) Goran Stojmirović
- (Socialist Federal Republic of Yugoslavia) Ilija Vujović
- (Socialist Federal Republic of Yugoslavia) Jovica Cvetković
- (Socialist Federal Republic of Yugoslavia) Dušan Marković
- (Socialist Federal Republic of Yugoslavia) Zdravko Kuljić
- (Socialist Federal Republic of Yugoslavia) Milan Žarković
- (Socialist Federal Republic of Yugoslavia) Željko Bulatović
- (Socialist Federal Republic of Yugoslavia) Zoran Tijanović
- (Socialist Federal Republic of Yugoslavia) Vladimir Trifunović
- (Socialist Federal Republic of Yugoslavia) Branislav Matijašević
- (Socialist Federal Republic of Yugoslavia) Nenad Đorđević
- (Socialist Federal Republic of Yugoslavia) Ivan Radivojević
- (Socialist Federal Republic of Yugoslavia) Nenad Komnenić
- (Socialist Federal Republic of Yugoslavia) Miodrag Mitić
- (Socialist Federal Republic of Yugoslavia) Nikola Matijašević
- (Socialist Federal Republic of Yugoslavia) Mirko Čulić
- (Socialist Federal Republic of Yugoslavia) Bojan Milić
- (Socialist Federal Republic of Yugoslavia) Zoran Luković
- (Socialist Federal Republic of Yugoslavia) Mihajlo Milutinović
- (Socialist Federal Republic of Yugoslavia) Vladimir Kocić
- (Socialist Federal Republic of Yugoslavia) Enes Hadžibegović
- (Socialist Federal Republic of Yugoslavia) Aleksandar Babić
- (Socialist Federal Republic of Yugoslavia) Dragan Vujović
- (Socialist Federal Republic of Yugoslavia) Sabahudin Peljto
- (Socialist Federal Republic of Yugoslavia) Milan Janković
- (Socialist Federal Republic of Yugoslavia) Željko Tanasković
- (Socialist Federal Republic of Yugoslavia) Igor Kolaković
- (Serbia) Goran Vujević
- (Serbia) Dragan Kobiljski
- (Socialist Federal Republic of Yugoslavia) Nenad Starčević
- (Serbia) Velibor Ivanović
- (Serbia) Vladislav Mandić
- (Serbia) Jasmin Dautović
- (Serbia) Nikola Poluga
- (Serbia) Nemanja Nićiforović
- (Serbia) Uroš Bulatović
- (Serbia) Marko Samardžić
- (Serbia) Bojan Kostadinović
- (Serbia) Bela Trubint
- (Serbia) Ratko Pavličević
- (Montenegro) Vladimir Racković
- (Montenegro) Srđan Popović
- (Serbia) Vuk Nikčević
- (Serbia) Duško Nikolić
- (Serbia) Vanja Prtenjača
- (Serbia) Vladimir Vasović
- (Serbia) Vladimir Rakić
- (Serbia) Vladimir Gavrilović
- (Serbia) Aleksandar Spirovski
- (Serbia) Branislav Mitrović
- (Serbia) Aleksandar Mitrović
- (Serbia) Vladan Đorđević
- (Serbia) Marko Zlatić
- (Serbia) Ivan Miljković
- (Serbia) Nikola Rosić
- (Serbia) Nebojša Đenić
- (Serbia) Bojan Gluvajić
- (Serbia) Igor Mladenović
- (Montenegro) Marko Vujović
- (Montenegro) Petar Čurović
- (Serbia) Ilija Mimić
- (Serbia) Duško Novoselac
- (Serbia) Petar Turanjanin
- (Serbia) Dušan Žeželj
- (Serbia) Aleksandar Atanasijević
- (Bosnia and Herzegovina) Žarko Kisić
- (Serbia) Aleksandar Ljubičić
- (Serbia) Siniša Žarković
- (Serbia) Uglješa Pešut
- (Serbia) Neven Majstorović
- (Serbia) Ivan Ilić
- (Serbia) Svetozar Marković
- (Serbia) Nemanja Balandžić
- (Serbia) Filip Đurković
- (Serbia) Boris Bakalov
- (Serbia) Saša Jović
- (Serbia) Filip Samardžić
- (Montenegro) Aleksandar Minić
- (Serbia) Aleksa Brđović
- (Serbia) Ivan Steljić
- (Serbia) Petar Palibrk
- (Serbia) Boris Buša
- (Serbia) Vladimir Miljkovic

== Notable former coaches ==
- (Socialist Federal Republic of Yugoslavia) Dragomir Popović
- (Socialist Federal Republic of Yugoslavia) Ivan Trinaestić
- (Socialist Federal Republic of Yugoslavia) Mihajlo Marković
- (Socialist Federal Republic of Yugoslavia) Zlatko Kovačević
- (Socialist Federal Republic of Yugoslavia) Dragoljub Babić
- (Socialist Federal Republic of Yugoslavia) Dragoslav Sirotanović
- (Socialist Federal Republic of Yugoslavia) Drago Tomić
- (Socialist Federal Republic of Yugoslavia) Lazar Grozdanović
- (Socialist Federal Republic of Yugoslavia) Miroslav Vorgić
- (Socialist Federal Republic of Yugoslavia) Petar Stanišić
- (Socialist Federal Republic of Yugoslavia) Sava Grozdanović
- (Socialist Federal Republic of Yugoslavia) Marko Pavlović
- (Socialist Federal Republic of Yugoslavia) Nikola Matijašević
- (Socialist Federal Republic of Yugoslavia) Branko Draganić
- (Socialist Federal Republic of Yugoslavia) Ljubomir Aćimović
- (Socialist Federal Republic of Yugoslavia) Radoslav Karaklajić
- (Socialist Federal Republic of Yugoslavia) Slavoljub Marković
- (Socialist Federal Republic of Yugoslavia) Vladimir Bogojevski
- (Serbia) Jovan Vukalović
- (Serbia) Bogdan Sretenović
- (Serbia) Dragan Balandžić
- (Serbia) Goran Janošević
- (Serbia) Željko Bulatović
- (Serbia) Milan Žarković
- (Serbia) Dejan Vulićević
- (Serbia) Milan Đuričić
- (Serbia) Katarina Kamen Ivkovic

== See also ==
- ŽOK Partizan
