= Matches of Serbian men's volleyball national team conducted by Slobodan Kovač =

List matches of Serbia men's national volleyball team conducted by Slobodan Kovač, who was announced a coach of Serbian national team on August 19, 2019. to October 23, 2021.

Overall Official
Matches	Victories	Defeats	Win %
36	26	10	72%

Overall Friendly
Matches	Victories	Defeats	Win %
12	8	4	67%

== Achievements ==
No.		Tournament	Place	Date	Final opponent	Result	Won/Lost
1.	Gold medal	CEV European Championship	Belgium / France / Netherlands / Slovenia	12–29 September 2019	Slovenia	3–1 ( 19–25, 25–16, 25–18, 25–20 )	9 / 0
2.	5th	Olympics European qualification	Berlin, Germany	5–10 January 2020	-	–	1 / 2
3.	6th	2021 FIVB Nations League	Rimini, Italy	28 May–27 June 2021	-	–	10 / 5
4.	4th	CEV European Championship	Czech Republic / Finland / Estonia/ Poland	1–19 September 2021	Poland	0–3 ( 22–25, 16–25, 22–25 )	6 / 3

== 2019 Official matches ==
=== 2019 CEV European Championship ===
* All times are Central European Summer Time (UTC+02:00)

==== Pool B ====
- Venue: Palais 12, Brussels, Belgium

Date	Time		Score		Set 1	Set 2	Set 3	Set 4	Set 5	Total	Report
13 Sep	15:00	Serbia	3–0	Germany	25–21	25–17	25–15			75–53	Report

- Venue: Sportpaleis, Antwerp, Belgium

Date	Time		Score		Set 1	Set 2	Set 3	Set 4	Set 5	Total	Report
15 Sep	18:30	Serbia	3–0	Slovakia	25–19	25–20	25–21			75–60	Report
16 Sep	20:30	Spain	1–3	Serbia	25–21	19–25	19–25	20–25		83–96	Report
18 Sep	20:30	Belgium	0–3	Serbia	19–25	21–25	19–25			59–75	Report
19 Sep	20:30	Serbia	3–0	Austria	25–16	25–22	25–20			75–58	Report

==== Round of 16 ====
- Venue: Palais 12, Brussels, Belgium

Date	Time		Score		Set 1	Set 2	Set 3	Set 4	Set 5	Total	Report
21 Sep	17:30	Serbia	3–0	Czech Republic	31–29	25–21	25–18			81–68	Report

==== Quarterfinals ====
- Venue: Omnisport Apeldoorn, Apeldoorn, Netherlands

Date	Time		Score		Set 1	Set 2	Set 3	Set 4	Set 5	Total	Report
24 Sep	20:30	Serbia	3–2	Ukraine	21–25	25–23	25–22	19–25	15–9	105–104	Report

==== Semifinals ====
- Venue: AccorHotels Arena, Paris, France

Date	Time		Score		Set 1	Set 2	Set 3	Set 4	Set 5	Total	Report
27 Sep	21:00	Serbia	3–2	France	23–25	25–23	25–21	17–25	15–7	105–101	Report

==== Final ====
- Venue: AccorHotels Arena, Paris, France

Date	Time		Score		Set 1	Set 2	Set 3	Set 4	Set 5	Total	Report
29 Sep	17:30	Serbia	3–1	Slovenia	19–25	25–16	25–18	25–20		94–79	Report

== 2020 Official matches ==
=== 2020 European Olympics qualification ===
- Venue: Max-Schmeling-Halle, Berlin, Germany

* All times are Central European Time (UTC+01:00)

=== Pool B ===
Date	Time		Score		Set 1	Set 2	Set 3	Set 4	Set 5	Total	Report
5 Jan	13:30	France	3–0	Serbia	25–21	25–21	25–22			75–64	Report
6 Jan	14:00	Netherlands	0–3	Serbia	18–25	18–25	17–25			53–75	Report
8 Jan	14:30	Serbia	2–3	Bulgaria	21–25	26–24	22–25	25–20	13–15	107–109	Report

== 2021 Official matches ==
=== 2021 FIVB Nations League ===
- Venue: Rimini Fiera, Rimini, Italy

* All times are Central European Summer Time (UTC+02:00)

=== Week 1 ===
Date	Time		Score		Set 1	Set 2	Set 3	Set 4	Set 5	Total	Report
28 May	15:00	Serbia	3–1	Slovenia	22–25	25–18	36–34	25–18		108–95	P2Report
29 May	16:00	Poland	3–1	Serbia	26–24	25–19	21–25	25–15		97–83	P2Report
30 May	21:00	Serbia	3–1	Italy	25–23	22–25	25–22	25–18		97–88	P2Report

=== Week 2 ===
Date	Time		Score		Set 1	Set 2	Set 3	Set 4	Set 5	Total	Report
3 Jun	13:00	Japan	1–3	Serbia	25–18	23–25	22–25	13–25		83–93	P2Report
4 Jun	15:00	Serbia	3–2	France	22–25	24–26	25–22	25–23	15–9	111–105	P2Report
5 Jun	15:00	Brazil	3–1	Serbia	23–25	25–23	25–15	25–22		98–85	P2Report

=== Week 3 ===
Date	Time		Score		Set 1	Set 2	Set 3	Set 4	Set 5	Total	Report
9 Jun	10:00	Serbia	3–1	Germany	19–25	25–22	25–18	25–15		94–80	P2Report
10 Jun	10:00	Serbia	3–2	Iran	21–25	25–15	26–28	25–22	15–8	112–98	P2Report
11 Jun	18:00	United States	1–3	Serbia	23–25	17–25	25–19	25–27		90–96	P2Report

=== Week 4 ===
Date	Time		Score		Set 1	Set 2	Set 3	Set 4	Set 5	Total	Report
15 Jun	10:00	Russia	3–1	Serbia	25–23	25–22	22–25	25–21		97–91	P2Report
16 Jun	12:00	Serbia	3–0	Bulgaria	25–20	25–17	25–17			75–54	P2Report
17 Jun	10:00	Argentina	3–0	Serbia	27–25	25–20	26–24			78–69	P2Report

=== Week 5 ===
Date	Time		Score		Set 1	Set 2	Set 3	Set 4	Set 5	Total	Report
21 Jun	10:00	Australia	1–3	Serbia	16–25	13–25	25–19	15–25		69–94	P2Report
22 Jun	12:00	Serbia	3–2	Netherlands	25–21	21–25	25–18	21–25	17–15	109–104	P2Report
23 Jun	12:00	Canada	3–2	Serbia	17–25	21–25	25–17	25–20	17–15	105–102	P2Report

=== 2021 CEV European Championship ===
* All times are Central European Summer Time (UTC+02:00)

=== Pool A ===
- Venue: Tauron Arena, Kraków, Poland

Date	Time		Score		Set 1	Set 2	Set 3	Set 4	Set 5	Total	Report
2 Sep	20:30	Belgium	1–3	Serbia	13–25	18–25	25–21	20–25		76–96	Report
3 Sep	20:30	Ukraine	0–3	Serbia	25–27	24–26	21–25			70–78	Report
4 Sep	20:30	Serbia	2–3	Poland	21–25	25–23	25–20	20–25	14–16	105–109	Report
6 Sep	17:30	Portugal	1–3	Serbia	15–25	21–25	25–22	17–25		78–97	Report
7 Sep	17:30	Serbia	3–2	Greece	25–23	22–25	25–16	28–30	15–5	115–99	Report

==== Round of 16 ====
- Venue: Ergo Arena, Gdańsk, Poland

Date	Time		Score		Set 1	Set 2	Set 3	Set 4	Set 5	Total	Report
12 Sep	20:30	Serbia	3–2	Turkey	25–18	22–25	22–25	25–23	15–12	109–103	Report

==== Quarterfinals ====
- Venue: Ergo Arena, Gdańsk, Poland

Date	Time		Score		Set 1	Set 2	Set 3	Set 4	Set 5	Total	Report
14 Sep	17:30	Netherlands	0–3	Serbia	23–25	20–25	25–27			68–77	Report

==== Semifinals ====
- Venue: Spodek, Katowice, Poland

Date	Time		Score		Set 1	Set 2	Set 3	Set 4	Set 5	Total	Report
18 Sep	21:00	Serbia	1–3	Italy	27–29	22–25	25–23	18–25		92–102	Report

=== 3rd place match ===
- Venue: Spodek, Katowice, Poland

Date	Time		Score		Set 1	Set 2	Set 3	Set 4	Set 5	Total	Report
19 Sep	17:30	Poland	3–0	Serbia	25–22	25–16	25–22			75–60	Report

== 2019 Friendly matches ==
=== Preparatory game ===
- Venue: Arena Stožice, Ljubljana, Slovenia

* All times are Central European Summer Time (UTC+02:00)

==== Slovenia - Serbia (3 Sep 2019) ====
Date	Time		Score		Set 1	Set 2	Set 3	Set 4	Set 5	Total	Report
3 Sep	20:00	Slovenia	2–3	Serbia	31–29	22–25	25–20	22–25	13–15	113–114	Report

==== Slovenia - Serbia (4 Sep 2019) ====
Date	Time		Score		Set 1	Set 2	Set 3	Set 4	Set 5	Total	Report
4 Sep	17:00	Slovenia	1–3	Serbia	23–25	22–25	22–25	25–14		92–89	Report

== 2021 Friendly matches ==
=== Preparatory game for 2021 FIVB Nations League ===
- Venue: Srebrno Jezero, Veliko Gradište, Serbia

* All times are Central European Summer Time (UTC+02:00)

==== Serbia - North Macedonia (14 May 2021) ====
Date	Time		Score		Set 1	Set 2	Set 3	Set 4	Set 5	Total	Report
14 May	19:00	Serbia	3–1	North Macedonia	25–17	28–26	23–25	25–23		101–91	Report

- Venue: Arena Stožice, Ljubljana, Slovenia

* All times are Central European Summer Time (UTC+02:00)

Date	Time		Score		Set 1	Set 2	Set 3	Set 4	Set 5	Total	Report
21 May	17:30	Serbia	1–2	Bulgaria	25–21	24–26	24–26			73–73	Report
21 May	19:00	Serbia	0–3	Slovenia	18–25	20–25	20–25			58–75	Report
22 May	15:30	Serbia	2–1	Bulgaria	21–25	25–17	25–18			71–60	Report
22 May	17:30	Serbia	2–1	Slovenia	16–25	25–23	25–18			66–66	Report
23 May	15:30	Serbia	3–0	Slovenia	25–18	25–23	25–21			75–62	Report
23 May	19:00	Serbia	1–2	Bulgaria	18–25	25–19	21–25			64–69	Report

=== Preparatory game for 2021 CEV European Championship ===
- Venue: Zaporizhzhia, Ukraine

* All times are Eastern European Summer Time (UTC+03:00)

Date	Time		Score		Set 1	Set 2	Set 3	Set 4	Set 5	Total	Report
20 Aug	19:50	Serbia	3–0	Ukraine	25–23	25–20	25–21			75–64	Report
21 Aug	16:00	Serbia	3–1	Bulgaria	30–28	25–15	23–25	25–21		103–89	Report
22 Aug	19:00	Serbia	2–3	Ukraine	17–25	25–27	25–22	26–24	10–15	103–113	Report

== See also ==
- Serbia men's national volleyball team
- Matches of Serbian men's volleyball national team conducted by Nikola Grbić
