= Serbian Volleyball Cup =

- Sport: Volleyball
- Founded: 2006; 20 years ago
- No. of teams: 16
- Country: Serbia; 2006–present
- Most recent champion: Spartak (1st title) (2025–26)
- Most titles: Vojvodina (6 titles)
- Website: ossrb.org

Serbian Volleyball Cup is the nationwide cup tournament for men's volleyball teams in Serbia.

== Winners ==
| Year | Winner | Runner-up |
|---|---|---|
| 2007 | Vojvodina | Mladi radnik |
| 2008 | Radnički | Ribnica |
| 2009 | Crvena zvezda | Radnički |
| 2010 | Vojvodina | Radnički |
| 2011 | Crvena zvezda | Partizan |
| 2012 | Vojvodina | Mladi radnik |
| 2013 | Crvena zvezda | Radnički |
| 2014 | Crvena zvezda | Ribnica |
| 2015 | Vojvodina | Partizan |
| 2016 | Crvena zvezda | Mladi radnik |
| 2017 | Novi Pazar | Vojvodina |
| 2018 | Novi Pazar | Crvena zvezda |
| 2019 | Crvena zvezda | Radnički |
| 2020 | Vojvodina | Partizan |
| 2021 | Ribnica | Radnički |
| 2022 | Partizan | Mladi radnik |
| 2023 | Partizan | Vojvodina |
| 2024 | Vojvodina | Mladi radnik |
| 2025 | Radnički | Partizan |
| 2026 | Spartak | Radnički |

== Titles by club ==
| Team | Cups | Years won |
|---|---|---|
| Vojvodina | 6 | 2007, 2010, 2012, 2015, 2020, 2024 |
| Crvena zvezda | 6 | 2009, 2011, 2013, 2014, 2016, 2019 |
| Radnički | 2 | 2008, 2025 |
| Partizan | 2 | 2022, 2023 |
| Novi Pazar | 2 | 2017, 2018 |
| Ribnica | 1 | 2021 |
| Spartak | 1 | 2026 |

== All-time Cup winners (Yugoslavia, Serbia&Montenegro, present day Serbia) ==
Total number of national cups won by Serbian clubs. Table includes titles won during the Yugoslav Volleyball Cup (1950–1992) and Serbia and Montenegro Volleyball Cup (1992–2006) as well.

| Club | Titles | Years won |
|---|---|---|
| Vojvodina | 16 | 1977, 1987, 1992, 1994, 1995, 1996, 1998, 2003, 2004, 2005, 2007, 2010, 2012, 2015, 2020, 2024 |
| Crvena zvezda | 14 | 1960, 1972, 1973, 1975, 1991, 1993, 1997, 1999, 2009, 2011, 2013, 2014, 2016, 2019 |
| Partizan | 9 | 1950, 1961, 1964, 1971, 1974, 1989, 1990, 2022, 2023 |
| Jugoslavija | 3 | 1959, 1961, 1962 |
| Novi Pazar | 2 | 2017, 2018 |
| Ribnica | 2 | 1978, 2021 |
| Radnički | 2 | 2008, 2025 |
| Spartak | 1 | 2026 |
