= 2007–08 Women's CEV Cup =

- League: Women's CEV Cup
- Sport: Volleyball

Women's CEV Cup seasons
- ← 2006–07 2008–09 →

The 2007–08 Women's CEV Cup was the 36th edition of the European Women's CEV Cup volleyball club tournament, the former Top Teams Cup.

== Teams of the 2007–2008 ==
	Country	The number of teams	Teams	
1	Austria	1	Sparkasse Klagenfurt	
2	Azerbaijan	1	Rabita Baku	
3	Belgium	2	Asterix Kieldrecht	VDK Gent Dames
4	Belarus	2	Minchanka Minsk	Atlant Baranovichi
5	Croatia	2	Pivovara Osijek	Mladost Zagreb
6	Cyprus	1	AEK Larnaca	
7	Denmark	1	Holte If	
8	Spain	2	CV Albacete	Universidad Burgos
9	France	2	USSP Albi	Rocheville Le Cannet
10	Greece	1	Panathinaikos Athens	
11	Italy	1	Scavolini Pesaro	
12	Luxembourg	1	Volley 80 Petange	
13	Netherlands	2	PlantinaLonga Lichtenvoorde	AMVJ Amstelveen
14	Poland	2	Aluprof Bielsko-Biała	Centrostal Pałac Bydgoszcz
15	Portugal	2	Ribeirense Pico	CS Madeira
16	Romania	2	Metal Galaţi	Dinamo București
17	Russia	1	Samorodok Khabarovsk	
18	Slovenia	1	Hit Nova Gorica	
19	Serbia	1	Crvena Zvezda Belgrade	
20	Switzerland	2	Zeiler Koniz	VFM Franches-Montagnes
21	Turkey	1	Dyo Karsiyaka Izmir	
22	Ukraine	1	Jinestra Odesa	

== Rules ==
When the two matches result in one win and one defeat for each team, the teams must play one extra set called GOLDEN SET. The Golden Set is to be played as a tie break set until 15 points. The team winning this GOLDEN SET will qualify for the next round regardless the results of the previous matches.

== Play-off ==
=== 1/16 Finals ===
- 1st leg 24–25 November 2007
- 2nd leg 1–2 December 2007

The 16 winning teams from the 1/16 Finals will compete in the 1/8 Finals playing Home & Away matches. The losers of the 1/16 Final matches will qualify for the 3rd round in Challenge Cup.

Team #1	Results	Team #2
Scavolini Pesaro (Italy)	3 – 0 (25–22, 25–12, 25–14); 3 – 0 (25–16, 25–18, 25–22)	(Portugal) CS Madeira
AMVJ Amstelveen (Netherlands)	3 – 0 (25–20, 25–12, 25–17); 3 – 1 (25–22, 25–19, 22–25, 28–26)	(Portugal) Ribeirense Pico
Metal Galaţi (Romania)	3 – 1 (22–25, 25–21, 25–17, 25–22); 0 – 3 (21–25, 15–25, 14–25); Golden Set: 15 – 9	(Romania) Dinamo București
Universidad Burgos (Spain)	0 – 3 19–25, 23–25, 17–25); 0 – 3 (22–25, 16–25, 16–25)	(Poland) Aluprof Bielsko-Biała
VDK Gent Dames (Belgium)	0 – 3 (12–25, 28–30, 18–25); 0 – 3 (21–25, 18–25, 24–26)	(Russia) Samorodok Khabarovsk
AEK Larnaca (Cyprus)	1 – 3 (8–25, 19–25, 25–21, 20–25); 0 – 3 (5–25, 12–25, 11–25)	(Ukraine) Jinestra Odesa
Minchanka Minsk (Belarus)	3 – 0; 3 – 0	(Luxembourg) Volley 80 Petange
Centrostal Pałac Bydgoszcz (Poland)	3 – 0 (25–12, 25–14, 25–14); 3 – 1 (26–24, 23–25, 30–28, 25–9)	(Turkey) Dyo Karsiyaka Izmir
Pivovara Osijek (Croatia)	3 – 0 (25–12, 25–20, 25–18); 3 – 1 (25–15, 25–23, 22–25, 25–16)	(Switzerland) VFM Franches-Montagnes
Panathinaikos Athens (Greece)	3 – 1 (25–17, 25–19, 26–28, 27–25); 1 – 3 (25–22, 22–25, 12–25, 24–26); Golden Set: 10 – 15	(Serbia) Crvena Zvezda Belgrade
Zeiler Koniz (Switzerland)	3 – 0 (25–19, 25–17, 25–16); 3 – 1 (31–33, 25–13, 25–10, 29–27)	(Austria) Sparkasse Klagenfurt
Holte If (Denmark)	0 – 3 (11–25, 12–25, 17–25); 0 – 3 (10–25, 13–25, 18–25)	(Spain) CV Albacete
PlantinaLonga Lichtenvoorde (Netherlands)	3 – 2 (10–25, 25–15, 19–25, 25–22, 15–9); 1 – 3 (25–23, 14–25, 20–25, 31–33); Golden Set: 8 – 15	(Belarus) Atlant Baranovichi
Hit Nova Gorica (Slovenia)	3 – 0 (25–16, 26–24, 25–18); 3 – 2 (19–25, 22–25, 25–16, 25–18, 15–7)	(Azerbaijan) Rabita Baku
Asterix Kieldrecht (Belgium)	3 – 0 (25–15, 25–21, 25–17); 3 – 1 (25–15, 21–25, 25–22, 25–21)	(Croatia) Mladost Zagreb
Rocheville Le Cannet (France)	3 – 1 (25–18, 25–18, 23–25, 25–21); 3 – 1 (29–27, 25–17, 28–30, 25–22)	(France) USSP Albi

=== 1/8 Finals ===
- 1st leg 11–13 December 2007
- 2nd leg 18–20 December 2007

Team #1	Results	Team #2
Scavolini Pesaro (Italy)	3 – 1 (25–15, 25–27, 25–20, 25–19); 3 – 0 (25–18, 27–25, 25–20)	(Netherlands) AMVJ Amstelveen
Metal Galaţi (Romania)	3 – 2 (21–25, 25–22, 22–25, 25–21, 15–11); 1 – 3 (20–25, 20–25, 25–20, 13–25); Golden Set: 13–15	(Poland) Aluprof Bielsko-Biała
Samorodok Khabarovsk (Russia)	3 – 0 (25–12, 25–16, 25–15); 3 – 0 (25–22, 25–21, 25–9)	(Ukraine) Jinestra Odesa
Minchanka Minsk (Belarus)	0 – 3 (20–25, 15–25, 22–25); 0 – 3 (20–25, 19–25, 15–25)	(Poland) Centrostal Pałac Bydgoszcz
Pivovara Osijek (Croatia)	0 – 3 (25–27, 11–25, 21–25); 1 – 3 (23–25, 25–22, 11–25, 20–25)	(Serbia) Crvena Zvezda Belgrade
Zeiler Koniz (Switzerland)	2 – 3 (25–23, 25–21, 23–25, 27–29, 3–15); 0 – 3 (14–25, 21–25, 17–25)	(Spain) CV Albacete
Atlant Baranovichi (Belarus)	3 – 0 (25–22, 25–22, 25–22); 1 – 3 (22–25, 25–19, 20–25, 19–25); Golden Set: 15 – 6	(Slovenia) Hit Nova Gorica
Asterix Kieldrecht (Belgium)	1 – 3 (7–25, 25–22, 18–25, 23–25); 1 – 3 (28–26, 13–25, 21–25, 15–25)	(France) Rocheville Le Cannet

=== 1/4 Finals ===
- 1st leg 23–24 January 2008
- 2nd leg 29–31 January 2008

Team #1	Results	Team #2
Scavolini Pesaro (Italy)	3 – 1 (23–25, 25–20, 25–22, 25–23); 3 – 0 (25–19, 25–19, 25–21)	(Poland) Aluprof Bielsko-Biała
Samorodok Khabarovsk (Russia)	w / o	(Poland) Centrostal Pałac Bydgoszcz
Crvena Zvezda Belgrade (Serbia)	3 – 2 (25–22, 25–15, 21–25, 21–25, 15–13); 3 – 2 (19–25, 25–22, 24–26, 25–21, 18–16)	(Spain) CV Albacete
Atlant Baranovichi (Belarus)	3 – 2 (21–25, 25–22, 21–25, 25–23, 15–9); 0 – 3 (19–25, 15–25, 17–25); Golden Set: 11–15	(France) Rocheville Le Cannet

== Final four ==
Belgrade, 15 & 16 March 2008

Semi-finals
15 March
(Italy) Scavolini Pesaro	3
(Russia) Samorodok Khabarovsk	0
15 March
(Serbia) Crvena Zvezda Belgrade	2
(France) Rocheville Le Cannet	3

Final
16 March
(Italy) Scavolini Pesaro	3
(France) Rocheville Le Cannet	0
3rd place
16 March
(Russia) Samorodok Khabarovsk	2
(Serbia) Crvena Zvezda Belgrade	3

=== Semi-finals ===
March 15, 2008
Scavolini Pesaro (Italy)	3 – 0	(Russia) Samorodok Khabarovsk	(25–15, 25–20, 25–15)
Rocheville Le Cannet (France)	3 – 2	(Serbia) Crvena Zvezda Belgrade	(25–21, 18–25, 25–20, 22–25, 15–10)

=== Match 3/4 ===
March 16, 2008
Crvena Zvezda Belgrade (Serbia)	3 – 2	(Russia) Samorodok Khabarovsk	(25–19, 24–26, 25–21, 23–25, 15–12)

=== Match 1/2 ===
March 16, 2008
Scavolini Pesaro (Italy)	3 – 0	(France) Rocheville Le Cannet	(25–15, 25–14, 26–24)

=== Awards ===
Winners:

- MVP: (Serbia) Vesna Jovanovic (Rocheville Le Cannet)
- Best scorer: (Serbia) Vesna Jovanović (Rocheville Le Cannet)
- Best spiker: (Germany) Christiane Fürst (Scavolini Pesaro)
- Best blocker: (Serbia) Bojana Živković (Crvena Zvezda Belgrade)
- Best libero: (Serbia) Nina Rosić (Crvena Zvezda Belgrade)
- Best setter: (Italy) Francesca Ferretti (Scavolini Pesaro)
- Best server: (Russia) Yuliana Kiseleva (Samorodok Khabarovsk)
- Best receiver: (France) Estelle Quérard (Rocheville Le Cannet)
