= Nina Rosić =

Serbian volleyball player (born 1990)

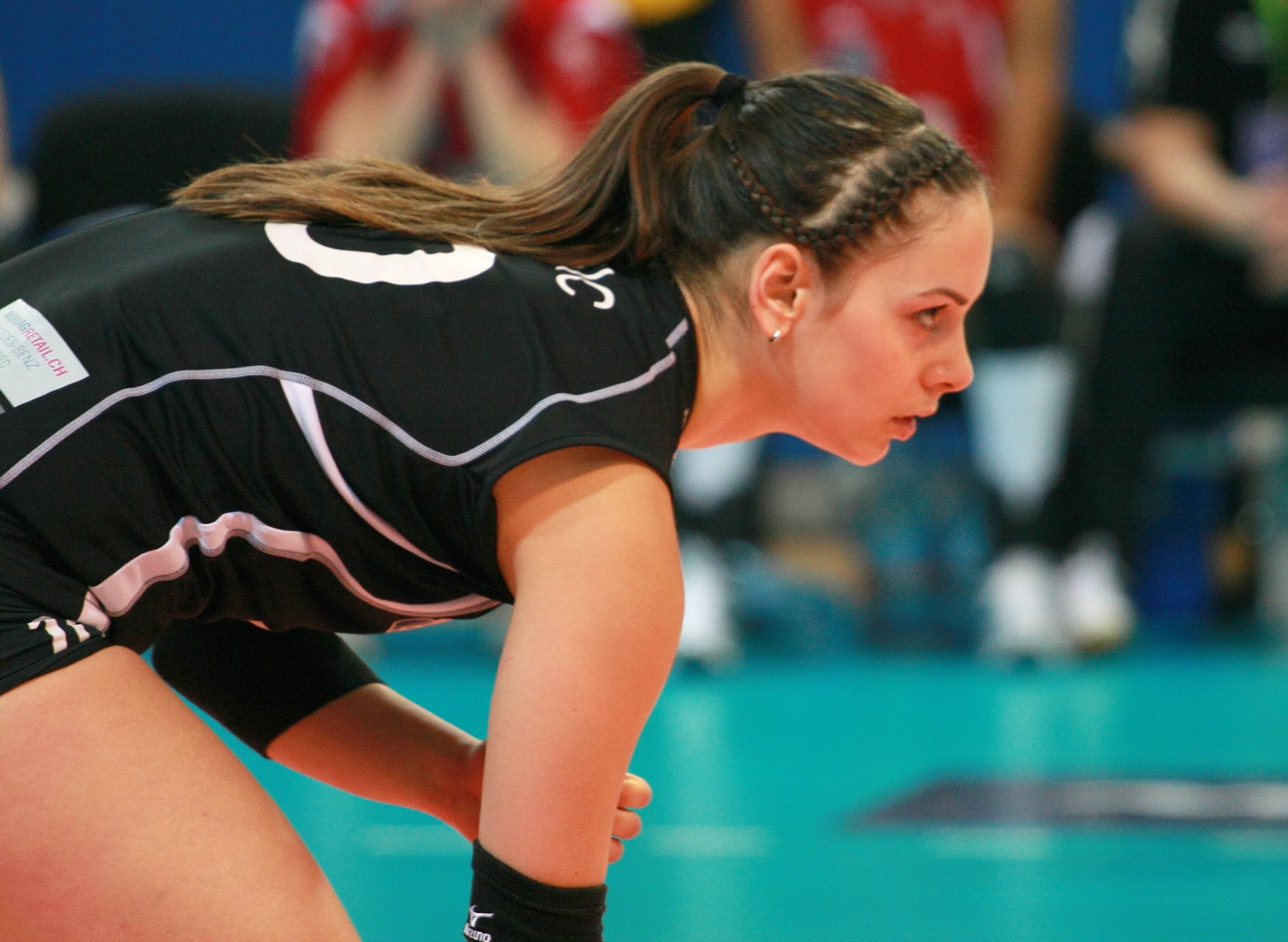

Personal information
- Nationality: Serbia
- Born: May 5, 1990 (age 36); Belgrade, SFR Yugoslavia
- Height: 1.72 m (5 ft 7 1/2 in)
- Weight: 66 kg (146 lb)

Volleyball information
- Position: libero

Career
Teams
	Crvena zvezda Voléro Zürich; Crvena zvezda

National team
Serbia
Honours
Women's volleyball
Representing Serbia
European League
Gold medal – first place	2009 Kayseri	Team

Nina Rosic (born May 5, 1990 in Belgrade) is a volleyball player from Serbia. She played for OK Crvena zvezda.

== Career ==
Rosić won the Best Libero award at the 2007–08 CEV Cup Final Four and her team won the bronze medal.

== Clubs ==
- (Serbia) Crvena zvezda Belgrade (2007-2010)
- (Switzerland) Voléro Zürich (2010-2014)
- (Serbia) Crvena zvezda Belgrade (2014)

OK Belgrade 2019

== Awards ==
=== Individuals ===
- 2007–08 CEV Cup Final Four "Best Libero"

=== National team ===
- 2009 European League - Gold Medal

=== Clubs ===
- 2007–08 CEV Cup - Bronze medal, with Crvena Zvezda Belgrade
- 2008–09 CEV Cup - Silver medal, with Crvena Zvezda Belgrade
- 2010/11 Swiss Cup - Champion, with Voléro Zürich
- 2010 Swiss Supercup - Champion, with Voléro Zürich
