= Aleksa Brđović =

Serbian volleyball player (born 1993)

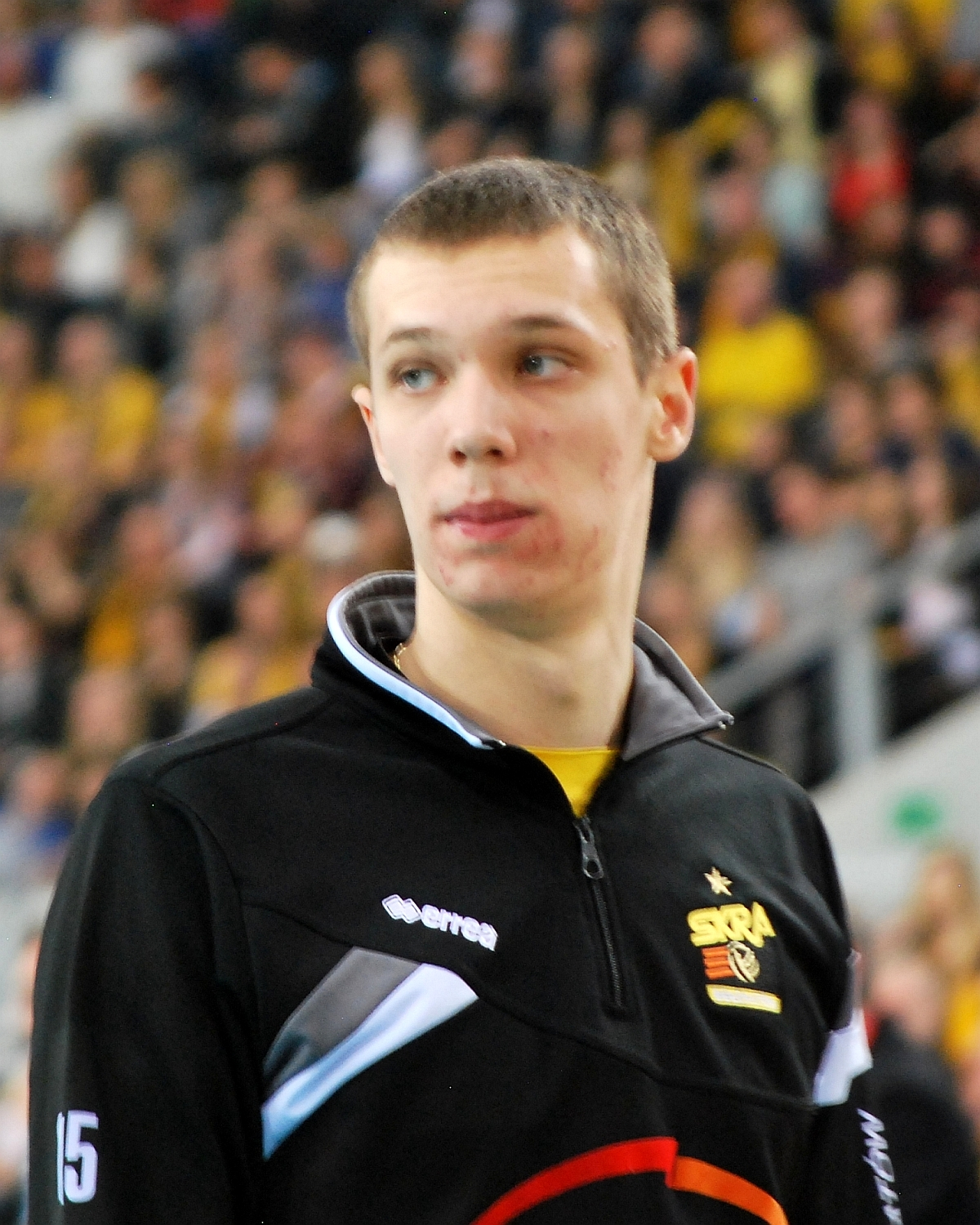

Personal information
- Full name: Aleksa Brđović
- Nationality: Serbian
- Born: July 29, 1993 (age 33); Belgrade, FR Yugoslavia
- Height: 2.03 m (6 ft 8 in)
- Weight: 91 kg (201 lb)
- Spike: 336 cm (132 in)
- Block: 320 cm (130 in)

Coaching information
- Current team: Orenburg
Previous teams coached
Years	Teams
2021–2026; 2026–	Radnički Kragujevac; Orenburg

Volleyball information
- Position: Setter

Career
Years	Teams
2009–2010; 2010–2011; 2011–2013; 2013–2015; 2015–2017	OK Ribnica; OK Mladi Radnik; OK Partizan; PGE Skra Bełchatów → Gazprom-Ugra Surgut

National team
2012–2017	Serbia
Honours
Representing Serbia
Men's volleyball
World League
Gold medal – first place	2016 Kraków
U19 World Championship
Gold medal – first place	2011 Argentina
- Last updated: 17 July 2016

Aleksa Brđović (born July 29, 1993) is a Serbian volleyball player, coach. His father was Dejan Brđović, successful volleyball player who competed for Yugoslavia.

== Career ==
=== Clubs ===
In 2013 he moved to Polish club PGE Skra Bełchatów. He won a title of Polish Champion 2014 with PGE Skra Bełchatów. On October 8, 2014, his team won ENEA Polish SuperCup 2014. On May 6, 2015, he won with PGE Skra Bełchatów bronze medal of Polish Championship. In May 2015 he left Polish team and went to Russian club Gazprom-Ugra Surgut. He signed two-year contract.

=== National team ===
He debuted in Serbian national team in 2012. He was appointed to the team at World League 2014 by coach Igor Kolaković.

== Sporting achievements ==
=== Clubs ===
==== National championships ====
- 2013/2014 Polish Championship, with PGE Skra Bełchatów
- 2014/2015 Polish SuperCup2014, with PGE Skra Bełchatów
- 2014/2015 Polish Championship, with PGE Skra Bełchatów

=== National team ===
- 2016 FIVB World League
