= Aleksandar Gigović =

Serbian volleyball player

Aleksandar Gigović (Serbian Cyrillic: Александар Гиговић; born April 20, 1983, in Kragujevac, Socialist Federative Republic of Yugoslavia – died on July 28, 2007, Ivanjica, Serbia) was a Serbian volleyball player who spent his entire career at OK Radnički Kragujevac.

Gigović started playing volleyball at the age of 11, initially as a setter and, later, as a receiver. In 2002, Dejan Brdović, the former captain of the Yugoslavia national team and head coach of OK Radnički Kragujevac at the time, acknowledged his talent. Shortly thereafter, Gigović joined the club, then played in the third tier of Serbian volleyball. Gigović helps his team reach the top-flight division, the Wiener Städtische Liga. At the end of the 2006-07 regular season, the club finished in first place in the standings but, following an injury to Gigović, lost to OK Ribnica Građevinar in the playoff semifinals.

Igor Kolaković, national team coach, was heavily criticized for failing to select the prospect ahead of the FIVB World League 2007 where the team achieved a disappointing 9th place. However, due to his performances in the domestic championship, Gigović is called to play for the national team at the 2007 Summer Universiade in Bangkok, Thailand. The team began its preparations for the tournament in the city of Ivanjica, Serbia. Only a few days later, his sudden death shocked the entire country of Serbia as well as the volleyball and sports world. It is reported that he died from a pulmonary embolism in his sleep during a short break.

On July 30, 2007, Alexander, Crown Prince of Yugoslavia, claimant to the throne of Serbia, extended his condolences to the Gigović family. In his letter to the President of the Serbian Volleyball Federation, the Crown Prince emphasized: “It was with great sadness that my family and I received news of the death of Aleksandar Gigović, member of our University National Team. This is a great loss for volleyball and a tragic loss of a young life. My family and I extend our deepest condolences to the family of this young sportsman. Destiny did not give him the opportunity to enjoy with all of us the winning of yet another gold medal for Serbia, which has become the new Balkan champion thanks to his colleagues, the youth volleyball players. In life, the sad news and the good news can happen at the same time, and so my family and I extend our congratulations to the youth volleyball players and wish them much more success in the future”.

Gigović's funeral took place in Kragujevac, where he was buried. In attendance were members of both the men's national team and the women's national team as well as several delegates and political figures.

Shortly after his death, his former club decided to organize an annual memorial tournament in his honour. The first edition of Aleksandar Gigović Memorial Tournament was played over a period of two days starting on September 28, 2007 and gathered OK Rabotnički Feršped, OK Budućnost Podgorica, and OK Vojvodina, along with the hosts. This tournament is now on the Serbian Volleyball Federation's official calendar and will be played every year at Jezero Hall during the last weekend of September, days before the start of the regular season.

On December 26, 2007, Gigović was posthumously awarded Radnički's Sports Association award as the best volleyball player in the club's history. The award was received by his father, Nebojša Gigović.
