= Matches of Serbian men's volleyball national team conducted by Nikola Grbić =

List matches of Serbia men's national volleyball team conducted by Nikola Grbić, who was head coach of Serbian national team from February 3, 2015, to August 16, 2019.

Overall
| Matches | Victories | Defeats | Win % |
| 106 | 65 | 41 | 61% |

== Achievements ==
| No. | | Tournament | Place | Date | Final opponent | Result | Won / Lost |
|---|---|---|---|---|---|---|---|
| 1. | 2nd place, silver medalist(s) | FIVB World League | Rio de Janeiro, Brazil | 29 May–19 July 2015 | France | 0–3 ( 19–25, 21–25, 23–25 ) | 9 / 7 |
| 2. | 7th | CEV European Championship | Italy / Bulgaria | 9–18 October 2015 | – | – | 3 / 2 |
| 3. | 5th | Olympics European qualification | Berlin, Germany | 5–10 January 2016 | | – | 1 / 2 |
| 4. | 1st place, gold medalist(s) | FIVB World League | Kraków, Poland | 16 June–17 July 2016 | Brazil | 3–0 ( 25–22, 25–22, 25–21 ) | 10 / 3 |
| 5. | 1st | World Championship qualification (CEV) | Zagreb, Croatia | 24–28 May 2017 | | – | 5 / 0 |
| 6. | 5th | FIVB World League | Curitiba, Brazil | 2 June–8 July 2017 | | – | 6 / 5 |
| 7. | 3rd place, bronze medalist(s) | CEV European Championship | Poland | 24 Aug–3 Sep 2017 | Belgium | 3–2 ( 25–17, 22–25, 19–25, 25–22, 15–12 ) | 5 / 1 |
| 8. | 5th | FIVB Nations League | Lille, France | 25 May–8 July 2018 | | – | 11 / 6 |
| 9. | 4th | FIVB World Championship | Italy / Bulgaria | 9–30 September 2018 | United States | 1–3 ( 25–23, 17–25, 30–32, 19–25 ) | 7 / 5 |
| 10. | 11th | FIVB Nations League | Intercontinental round | 31 May–30 June 2019 | | – | 6 / 9 |
| 11. | 2nd | Intercontinental Olympic Qualification | Bari, Italy | 9–11 August 2019 | | – | 2 / 1 |

== 2015 Official matches ==
=== 2015 FIVB World League ===
==== Week 3 ====
- Venue: Mineirinho Arena, Belo Horizonte, Brazil

| Date | Time | | Score | | Set 1 | Set 2 | Set 3 | Set 4 | Set 5 | Total | Report |
|---|---|---|---|---|---|---|---|---|---|---|---|
| 29 May | 14:00 | Brazil | 3–2 | Serbia | 24–26 | 25–17 | 25–22 | 26–28 | 15–11 | 115–104 | P2 P3 |
| 31 May | 10:00 | Brazil | 3–1 | Serbia | 25–18 | 25–20 | 19–25 | 25–22 | | 94–85 | P2 P3 |

==== Week 4 ====
- Venue: Adriatic Arena, Pesaro, Italy
- Venue: Land Rover Arena, Bologna, Italy

| Date | Time | | Score | | Set 1 | Set 2 | Set 3 | Set 4 | Set 5 | Total | Report |
|---|---|---|---|---|---|---|---|---|---|---|---|
| 5 Jun | 20:40 | Italy | 1–3 | Serbia | 25–22 | 23–25 | 24–26 | 23–25 | | 95–98 | P2 P3 |
| 7 Jun | 18:10 | Italy | 3–2 | Serbia | 25–14 | 19–25 | 18–25 | 25–20 | 15–12 | 102–96 | P2 P3 |

==== Week 5 ====
- Venue: SPC Vojvodina, Novi Sad, Serbia
- Venue: Pionir Hall, Belgrade, Serbia

| Date | Time | | Score | | Set 1 | Set 2 | Set 3 | Set 4 | Set 5 | Total | Report |
|---|---|---|---|---|---|---|---|---|---|---|---|
| 12 Jun | 20:10 | Serbia | 3–2 | Brazil | 22–25 | 23–25 | 25–23 | 25–21 | 15–13 | 110–107 | P2 P3 |
| 14 Jun | 20:10 | Serbia | 2–3 | Brazil | 23–25 | 25–20 | 21–25 | 25–22 | 13–15 | 107–107 | P2 P3 |

==== Week 6 ====
- Venue: SPC Vojvodina, Novi Sad, Serbia
- Venue: Pionir Hall, Belgrade, Serbia

| Date | Time | | Score | | Set 1 | Set 2 | Set 3 | Set 4 | Set 5 | Total | Report |
|---|---|---|---|---|---|---|---|---|---|---|---|
| 18 Jun | 20:10 | Serbia | 3–0 | Australia | 31–29 | 27–25 | 25–19 | | | 83–73 | P2 P3 |
| 20 Jun | 20:10 | Serbia | 3–0 | Australia | 25–23 | 25–20 | 25–20 | | | 75–63 | P2 P3 |

==== Week 7 ====
- Venue: SPC Vojvodina, Novi Sad, Serbia
- Venue: Pionir Hall, Belgrade, Serbia

| Date | Time | | Score | | Set 1 | Set 2 | Set 3 | Set 4 | Set 5 | Total | Report |
|---|---|---|---|---|---|---|---|---|---|---|---|
| 26 Jun | 20:10 | Serbia | 3–1 | Italy | 25–23 | 25–20 | 25–27 | 25–21 | | 100–91 | P2 P3 |
| 28 Jun | 20:10 | Serbia | 3–2 | Italy | 26–24 | 21–25 | 26–24 | 23–25 | 17–15 | 113–113 | P2 P3 |

==== Week 8 ====
- Venue: State Basketball Centre, Wantirna South, Australia

| Date | Time | | Score | | Set 1 | Set 2 | Set 3 | Set 4 | Set 5 | Total | Report |
|---|---|---|---|---|---|---|---|---|---|---|---|
| 4 Jul | 19:10 | Australia | 1–3 | Serbia | 22–25 | 21–25 | 31–29 | 18–25 | | 92–104 | P2 P3 |
| 5 Jul | 16:40 | Australia | 3–2 | Serbia | 25–22 | 22–25 | 13–25 | 25–21 | 15–12 | 100–105 | P2 P3 |

==== Final Round ====
- Venue: Ginásio do Maracanãzinho, Rio de Janeiro, Brazil

*All times are Brasília Time (UTC−03:00).

| Date | Time | | Score | | Set 1 | Set 2 | Set 3 | Set 4 | Set 5 | Total | Report |
|---|---|---|---|---|---|---|---|---|---|---|---|
| 15 Jul | 16:55 | Serbia | 2–3 | Italy | 23–25 | 25–14 | 23–25 | 25–20 | 9–15 | 105–99 | P2 P3 |
| 17 Jul | 16:45 | Serbia | 3–2 | Poland | 18–25 | 25–22 | 22–25 | 25–22 | 15–13 | 105–107 | P2 P3 |

==== Semifinals ====
| Date | Time | | Score | | Set 1 | Set 2 | Set 3 | Set 4 | Set 5 | Total | Report |
|---|---|---|---|---|---|---|---|---|---|---|---|
| 18 Jul | 10:00 | United States | 2–3 | Serbia | 23–25 | 21–25 | 27–25 | 25–20 | 12–15 | 108–110 | P2 P3 |

==== Final ====
| Date | Time | | Score | | Set 1 | Set 2 | Set 3 | Set 4 | Set 5 | Total | Report |
|---|---|---|---|---|---|---|---|---|---|---|---|
| 19 Jul | 11:30 | Serbia | 0–3 | France | 19–25 | 21–25 | 23–25 | | | 63–75 | P2 P3 |

=== 2015 CEV European Championship ===
==== Pool D ====
- Venue: PalaYamamay, Busto Arsizio, Italy

* All times are Central European Summer Time (UTC+02:00)

| Date | Time | | Score | | Set 1 | Set 2 | Set 3 | Set 4 | Set 5 | Total | Report |
|---|---|---|---|---|---|---|---|---|---|---|---|
| 9 Oct | 17:30 | Slovakia | 2–3 | Serbia | 22–25 | 25–22 | 28–30 | 26–24 | 9–15 | 110–116 | Report |
| 10 Oct | 15:00 | Serbia | 3–0 | Finland | 25–19 | 25–15 | 25–21 | | | 75–55 | Report |
| 11 Oct | 18:00 | Serbia | 1–3 | Russia | 23–25 | 25–21 | 18–25 | 20–25 | | 86–96 | Report |

==== Playoffs ====
| Date | Time | | Score | | Set 1 | Set 2 | Set 3 | Set 4 | Set 5 | Total | Report |
|---|---|---|---|---|---|---|---|---|---|---|---|
| 13 Oct | 17:30 | Serbia | 3–2 | Estonia | 21–25 | 14–25 | 25–8 | 25–22 | 15–13 | 100–93 | Report |

==== Quarterfinals ====
| Date | Time | | Score | | Set 1 | Set 2 | Set 3 | Set 4 | Set 5 | Total | Report |
|---|---|---|---|---|---|---|---|---|---|---|---|
| 14 Oct | 17:30 | France | 3–1 | Serbia | 25–22 | 25–23 | 14–25 | 25–20 | | 89–90 | Report |

== 2016 Official matches ==
=== 2016 European Olympics qualification ===
* All times are Central European Time (UTC+01:00)

==== Pool A ====
| Date | Time | | Score | | Set 1 | Set 2 | Set 3 | Set 4 | Set 5 | Total | Report |
|---|---|---|---|---|---|---|---|---|---|---|---|
| 5 Jan | 20:30 | Serbia | 1–3 | Poland | 25–22 | 18–25 | 23–25 | 21–25 | | 87–97 | Report |
| 6 Jan | 18:00 | Germany | 3–0 | Serbia | 25–20 | 26–24 | 25–20 | | | 76–64 | Report |
| 8 Jan | 14:00 | Serbia | 3–1 | Belgium | 25–18 | 21–25 | 25–21 | 25–21 | | 96–85 | Report |

=== 2016 FIVB World League ===
==== Pool C1 ====
- Venue: Yantarny Sports Complex, Kaliningrad, Russia

*All times are Kaliningrad Time (UTC+02:00).

| Date | Time | | Score | | Set 1 | Set 2 | Set 3 | Set 4 | Set 5 | Total | Report |
|---|---|---|---|---|---|---|---|---|---|---|---|
| 17 Jun | 19:10 | Russia | 0–3 | Serbia | 22–25 | 32–34 | 17–25 | | | 71–84 | P2 P3 |
| 18 Jun | 16:40 | Bulgaria | 0–3 | Serbia | 26–28 | 25–27 | 18–25 | | | 69–80 | P2 P3 |
| 19 Jun | 16:40 | Serbia | 3–0 | Poland | 25–20 | 25–20 | 25–23 | | | 75–63 | P2 P3 |

==== Pool F1 ====
- Venue: Hall Aleksandar Nikolić, Belgrade, Serbia

*All times are Central European Summer Time (UTC+02:00).

| Date | Time | | Score | | Set 1 | Set 2 | Set 3 | Set 4 | Set 5 | Total | Report |
|---|---|---|---|---|---|---|---|---|---|---|---|
| 23 Jun | 19:00 | Brazil | 1–3 | Serbia | 25–19 | 15–25 | 21–25 | 22–25 | | 83–94 | P2 P3 |
| 24 Jun | 19:00 | Serbia | 3–1 | Bulgaria | 25–18 | 21–25 | 25–19 | 25–23 | | 96–85 | P2 P3 |
| 25 Jun | 19:00 | Iran | 1–3 | Serbia | 19–25 | 26–24 | 18–25 | 21–25 | | 84–99 | P2 P3 |

==== Pool I1 ====
- Venue: Azadi Indoor Stadium, Tehran, Iran

*All times are Iran Daylight Time (UTC+04:30).

| Date | Time | | Score | | Set 1 | Set 2 | Set 3 | Set 4 | Set 5 | Total | Report |
|---|---|---|---|---|---|---|---|---|---|---|---|
| 1 Jul | 21:00 | Iran | 3–2 | Serbia | 18–25 | 22–25 | 25–22 | 25–23 | 16–14 | 106–109 | P2 P3 |
| 2 Jul | 18:00 | Serbia | 0–3 | Argentina | 23–25 | 22–25 | 20–25 | | | 65–75 | P2 P3 |
| 3 Jul | 18:00 | Italy | 2–3 | Serbia | 19–25 | 18–25 | 25–19 | 25–22 | 15–17 | 102–108 | P2 P3 |

==== Final Round ====
- Venue: Tauron Arena Kraków, Kraków, Poland

*All times are Central European Summer Time (UTC+02:00).

| Date | Time | | Score | | Set 1 | Set 2 | Set 3 | Set 4 | Set 5 | Total | Report |
|---|---|---|---|---|---|---|---|---|---|---|---|
| 14 Jul | 20:30 | Poland | 1–3 | Serbia | 23–25 | 20–25 | 25–18 | 18–25 | | 86–93 | P2 P3 |
| 15 Jul | 17:30 | Serbia | 2–3 | France | 20–25 | 19–25 | 26–24 | 25–19 | 12–15 | 102–108 | P2 P3 |

==== Semifinals ====
| Date | Time | | Score | | Set 1 | Set 2 | Set 3 | Set 4 | Set 5 | Total | Report |
|---|---|---|---|---|---|---|---|---|---|---|---|
| 16 Jul | 17:30 | Serbia | 3–2 | Italy | 23–25 | 25–21 | 25–23 | 18–25 | 15–11 | 106–105 | P2 P3 |

==== Final ====
| Date | Time | | Score | | Set 1 | Set 2 | Set 3 | Set 4 | Set 5 | Total | Report |
|---|---|---|---|---|---|---|---|---|---|---|---|
| 17 Jul | 20:30 | Serbia | 3–0 | Brazil | 25–22 | 25–22 | 25–21 | | | 75–65 | P2 P3 |

== 2017 Official matches ==
=== 2018 FIVB World Championship qualification (CEV) ===
==== Pool E ====
- Venue: Dom odbojke Bojan Stranic, Zagreb, Croatia
- Dates: 24–28 May 2017

*All times are Central European Summer Time (UTC+02:00).

| Date | Time | | Score | | Set 1 | Set 2 | Set 3 | Set 4 | Set 5 | Total | Report |
|---|---|---|---|---|---|---|---|---|---|---|---|
| 24 May | 17:30 | Serbia | 3–0 | Belarus | 25–17 | 25–22 | 25–15 | | | 75–54 | Report |
| 25 May | 15:00 | Denmark | 0–3 | Serbia | 23–25 | 32–34 | 19–25 | | | 74–84 | Report |
| 26 May | 17:30 | Serbia | 3–0 | Switzerland | 25–15 | 25–18 | 25–18 | | | 75–51 | Report |
| 27 May | 15:00 | Serbia | 3–0 | Norway | 25–12 | 25–14 | 25–12 | | | 75–38 | Report |
| 28 May | 17:30 | Croatia | 0–3 | Serbia | 23–25 | 16–25 | 21–25 | | | 60–75 | Report |

=== 2017 FIVB World League ===
==== Pool B1 ====
- Venue: SPC Vojvodina, Novi Sad, Serbia

*All times are Central European Summer Time (UTC+02:00).

| Date | Time | | Score | | Set 1 | Set 2 | Set 3 | Set 4 | Set 5 | Total | Report |
|---|---|---|---|---|---|---|---|---|---|---|---|
| 2 Jun | 19:00 | Serbia | 3–1 | United States | 25–18 | 23–25 | 25–20 | 25–21 | | 98–84 | P2 P3 |
| 3 Jun | 19:00 | Belgium | 3–0 | Serbia | 25–20 | 25–18 | 25–23 | | | 75–61 | P2 P3 |
| 4 Jun | 19:00 | Canada | 1–3 | Serbia | 23–25 | 21–25 | 25–20 | 20–25 | | 89–95 | P2 P3 |

==== Pool D1 ====
- Venue: Azadi Indoor Stadium, Tehran, Iran

*All times are Iran Daylight Time (UTC+04:30).

| Date | Time | | Score | | Set 1 | Set 2 | Set 3 | Set 4 | Set 5 | Total | Report |
|---|---|---|---|---|---|---|---|---|---|---|---|
| 9 Jun | 18:10 | Serbia | 3–0 | Argentina | 25–18 | 25–22 | 25–23 | | | 75–63 | P2 P3 |
| 10 Jun | 21:15 | Iran | 1–3 | Serbia | 20–25 | 23–25 | 25–16 | 16–25 | | 84–91 | P2 P3 |
| 11 Jun | 18:10 | Serbia | 3–0 | Belgium | 25–22 | 25–18 | 25–20 | | | 75–60 | P2 P3 |

==== Pool G1 ====
- Venue: Orfeo Superdomo, Córdoba, Argentina

*All times are Argentina Time (UTC−03:00).

| Date | Time | | Score | | Set 1 | Set 2 | Set 3 | Set 4 | Set 5 | Total | Report |
|---|---|---|---|---|---|---|---|---|---|---|---|
| 16 Jun | 21:10 | Argentina | 2–3 | Serbia | 22–25 | 25–19 | 22–25 | 30–28 | 12–15 | 111–112 | P2 P3 |
| 17 Jun | 16:10 | Bulgaria | 3–2 | Serbia | 25–18 | 20–25 | 25–23 | 24–26 | 15–12 | 109–104 | P2 P3 |
| 18 Jun | 16:10 | Serbia | 1–3 | Brazil | 22–25 | 16–25 | 25–17 | 23–25 | | 86–92 | P2 P3 |

==== Final Round ====
- Venue: Arena da Baixada, Curitiba, Brazil

*All times are Brasília Time (UTC−03:00).

| Date | Time | | Score | | Set 1 | Set 2 | Set 3 | Set 4 | Set 5 | Total | Report |
|---|---|---|---|---|---|---|---|---|---|---|---|
| 5 Jul | 17:40 | Serbia | 1–3 | United States | 22–25 | 23–25 | 25–19 | 22–25 | | 92–94 | P2 P3 |
| 6 Jul | 18:10 | France | 3–2 | Serbia | 25–21 | 25–20 | 17–25 | 18–25 | 15–11 | 100–102 | P2 P3 |

=== 2017 CEV European Championship ===
All times are local Central European Summer Time (UTC+2).

==== Pool A ====
| Date | Time | | Score | | Set 1 | Set 2 | Set 3 | Set 4 | Set 5 | Total | Report |
|---|---|---|---|---|---|---|---|---|---|---|---|
| 24 Aug | 20:30 | Poland | 0–3 | Serbia | 22–25 | 22–25 | 20–25 | | | 64–75 | Report |
| 26 Aug | 17:30 | Estonia | 2–3 | Serbia | 23–25 | 25–16 | 25–21 | 20–25 | 12–15 | 105–102 | Report |
| 28 Aug | 17:30 | Serbia | 3–0 | Finland | 25–20 | 25–18 | 34–32 | | | 84–70 | Report |

==== Quarterfinals ====
| Date | Time | | Score | | Set 1 | Set 2 | Set 3 | Set 4 | Set 5 | Total | Report |
|---|---|---|---|---|---|---|---|---|---|---|---|
| 31 Aug | 20:30 | Serbia | 3–0 | Bulgaria | 25–21 | 25–22 | 28–26 | | | 78–69 | Report |

==== Semifinals ====
| Date | Time | | Score | | Set 1 | Set 2 | Set 3 | Set 4 | Set 5 | Total | Report |
|---|---|---|---|---|---|---|---|---|---|---|---|
| 2 Sep | 17:30 | Serbia | 2–3 | Germany | 26–24 | 25–15 | 18–25 | 25–27 | 13–15 | 107–106 | Report |

==== Third place game ====
| Date | Time | | Score | | Set 1 | Set 2 | Set 3 | Set 4 | Set 5 | Total | Report |
|---|---|---|---|---|---|---|---|---|---|---|---|
| 3 Sep | 17:30 | Serbia | 3–2 | Belgium | 25–17 | 22–25 | 19–25 | 25–22 | 15–12 | 106–101 | Report |

== 2018 Official matches ==
=== 2018 FIVB Nations League ===
==== Pool 4 ====
- Venue: Kraljevo Sports Hall, Kraljevo, Serbia

*All times are Central European Summer Time (UTC+02:00).

| Date | Time | | Score | | Set 1 | Set 2 | Set 3 | Set 4 | Set 5 | Total | Report |
|---|---|---|---|---|---|---|---|---|---|---|---|
| 25 May | 20:00 | Serbia | 0–3 | Brazil | 22–25 | 22–25 | 24–26 | | | 68–76 | P2 Report |
| 26 May | 19:00 | Germany | 1–3 | Serbia | 25–19 | 21–25 | 16–25 | 14–25 | | 76–94 | P2 Report |
| 27 May | 19:00 | Italy | 3–0 | Serbia | 25–21 | 25–18 | 25–16 | | | 75–55 | P2 Report |

==== Pool 5 ====
- Venue: Armeets Arena, Sofia, Bulgaria

*All times are Eastern European Summer Time (UTC+03:00).

| Date | Time | | Score | | Set 1 | Set 2 | Set 3 | Set 4 | Set 5 | Total | Report |
|---|---|---|---|---|---|---|---|---|---|---|---|
| 1 Jun | 20:00 | Bulgaria | 2–3 | Serbia | 17–25 | 25–23 | 25–23 | 21–25 | 14–16 | 102–112 | P2 Report |
| 2 Jun | 17:00 | Russia | 2–3 | Serbia | 25–20 | 23–25 | 23–25 | 25–22 | 12–15 | 108–107 | P2 Report |
| 3 Jun | 17:00 | Serbia | 3–2 | Australia | 25–23 | 25–19 | 20–25 | 25–27 | 15–9 | 110–103 | P2 Report |

==== Pool 12 ====
- Venue: L'arena du pays d'Aix, Aix-en-Provence, France

*All times are Central European Summer Time (UTC+02:00).

| Date | Time | | Score | | Set 1 | Set 2 | Set 3 | Set 4 | Set 5 | Total | Report |
|---|---|---|---|---|---|---|---|---|---|---|---|
| 8 Jun | 17:00 | Argentina | 1–3 | Serbia | 25–20 | 23–25 | 15–25 | 22–25 | | 85–95 | P2 Report |
| 9 Jun | 21:00 | South Korea | 0–3 | Serbia | 16–25 | 23–25 | 19–25 | | | 58–75 | P2 Report |
| 10 Jun | 18:00 | France | 3–0 | Serbia | 31–29 | 25–16 | 25–15 | | | 81–60 | P2 Report |

==== Pool 15 ====
- Venue: Sears Centre Arena, Hoffman Estates, United States

*All times are Central Daylight Time (UTC−05:00).

| Date | Time | | Score | | Set 1 | Set 2 | Set 3 | Set 4 | Set 5 | Total | Report |
|---|---|---|---|---|---|---|---|---|---|---|---|
| 15 Jun | 20:00 | United States | 3–0 | Serbia | 25–22 | 25–16 | 25–14 | | | 75–52 | P2 Report |
| 16 Jun | 14:00 | Iran | 2–3 | Serbia | 25–21 | 22–25 | 25–27 | 25–20 | 11–15 | 108–108 | P2 Report |
| 17 Jun | 12:00 | Poland | 0–3 | Serbia | 23–25 | 23–25 | 23–25 | | | 69–75 | P2 Report |

==== Pool 18 ====
- Venue: Jiangmen Sports Center Gymnasium, Jiangmen, China

*All times are China Standard Time (UTC+08:00).

| Date | Time | | Score | | Set 1 | Set 2 | Set 3 | Set 4 | Set 5 | Total | Report |
|---|---|---|---|---|---|---|---|---|---|---|---|
| 22 Jun | 16:00 | Canada | 0–3 | Serbia | 21–25 | 18–25 | 17–25 | | | 56–75 | P2 Report |
| 23 Jun | 16:00 | Japan | 1–3 | Serbia | 28–26 | 33–35 | 21–25 | 18–25 | | 100–111 | P2 Report |
| 24 Jun | 19:30 | China | 1–3 | Serbia | 21–25 | 22–25 | 25–17 | 15–25 | | 83–92 | P2 Report |

=== Final round ===
- Venue: Stade Pierre-Mauroy, Lille, France

*All times are Central European Summer Time (UTC+02:00).

| Date | Time | | Score | | Set 1 | Set 2 | Set 3 | Set 4 | Set 5 | Total | Report |
|---|---|---|---|---|---|---|---|---|---|---|---|
| 5 Jul | 20:45 | Serbia | 0–3 | Brazil | 16–25 | 26–28 | 19–25 | | | 61–78 | P2 Report |
| 6 Jul | 20:45 | France | 3–0 | Serbia | 25–19 | 25–18 | 25–17 | | | 75–54 | P2 Report |

=== 2018 FIVB World Championship ===
==== Pool C ====
- Venue: PalaFlorio, Bari, Italy

*All times are Central European Summer Time (UTC+02:00).

| Date | Time | | Score | | Set 1 | Set 2 | Set 3 | Set 4 | Set 5 | Total | Report |
|---|---|---|---|---|---|---|---|---|---|---|---|
| 12 Sep | 20:30 | United States | 3–2 | Serbia | 15–25 | 25–14 | 21–25 | 25–20 | 15–10 | 101–94 | P2 Report |
| 13 Sep | 20:30 | Cameroon | 0–3 | Serbia | 28–30 | 16–25 | 17–25 | | | 61–80 | P2 Report |
| 15 Sep | 17:00 | Serbia | 3–1 | Tunisia | 20–25 | 25–20 | 25–21 | 25–20 | | 95–86 | P2 Report |
| 16 Sep | 20:30 | Serbia | 3–1 | Australia | 25–20 | 21–25 | 25–17 | 25–19 | | 96–81 | P2 Report |
| 18 Sep | 20:30 | Serbia | 3–2 | Russia | 25–21 | 24–26 | 25–17 | 22–25 | 15–12 | 111–101 | P2 Report |

==== Pool H ====
- Venue: Palace of Culture and Sports, Varna, Bulgaria

*All times are Eastern European Summer Time (UTC+03:00).

| Date | Time | | Score | | Set 1 | Set 2 | Set 3 | Set 4 | Set 5 | Total | Report |
|---|---|---|---|---|---|---|---|---|---|---|---|
| 21 Sep | 17:00 | Serbia | 3–2 | France | 22–25 | 26–24 | 25–20 | 18–25 | 18–16 | 109–110 | P2 Report |
| 22 Sep | 17:00 | Serbia | 3–0 | Argentina | 25–18 | 25–22 | 25–22 | | | 75–62 | P2 Report |
| 23 Sep | 20:40 | Poland | 3–0 | Serbia | 25–17 | 25–16 | 25–14 | | | 75–47 | P2 Report |

==== Pool J ====
- Venue: Pala Alpitour, Turin, Italy

*All times are Central European Summer Time (UTC+02:00).

| Date | Time | | Score | | Set 1 | Set 2 | Set 3 | Set 4 | Set 5 | Total | Report |
|---|---|---|---|---|---|---|---|---|---|---|---|
| 26 Sep | 21:15 | Italy | 0–3 | Serbia | 15–25 | 20–25 | 18–25 | | | 53–75 | P2 Report |
| 27 Sep | 20:30 | Poland | 3–0 | Serbia | 28–26 | 28–26 | 25–22 | | | 81–74 | P2 Report |

==== Semifinals ====
| Date | Time | | Score | | Set 1 | Set 2 | Set 3 | Set 4 | Set 5 | Total | Report |
|---|---|---|---|---|---|---|---|---|---|---|---|
| 29 Sep | 17:00 | Brazil | 3–0 | Serbia | 25–22 | 25–21 | 25–22 | | | 75–65 | P2 Report |

==== 3rd place match ====
| Date | Time | | Score | | Set 1 | Set 2 | Set 3 | Set 4 | Set 5 | Total | Report |
|---|---|---|---|---|---|---|---|---|---|---|---|
| 30 Sep | 17:00 | Serbia | 1–3 | United States | 25–23 | 17–25 | 30–32 | 19–25 | | 91–105 | P2 Report |

== 2019 Official matches ==
=== 2019 FIVB Nations League ===
==== Pool 4 ====
- Venue: Spodek, Katowice, Poland

*All times are Central European Summer Time (UTC+02:00).

| Date | Time | | Score | | Set 1 | Set 2 | Set 3 | Set 4 | Set 5 | Total | Report |
|---|---|---|---|---|---|---|---|---|---|---|---|
| 31 May | 17:00 | Serbia | 1–3 | Japan | 17–25 | 12–25 | 26–24 | 17–25 | | 72–99 | P2 Report |
| 1 Jun | 19:15 | Serbia | 1–3 | France | 12–25 | 22–25 | 25–20 | 20–25 | | 79–95 | P2 Report |
| 2 Jun | 19:00 | Russia | 3–2 | Serbia | 20–25 | 26–24 | 25–23 | 22–25 | 15–10 | 108–107 | P2 Report |

==== Pool 8 ====
- Venue: TD Place Arena, Ottawa, Canada

*All times are Eastern Daylight Time (UTC−04:00).

| Date | Time | | Score | | Set 1 | Set 2 | Set 3 | Set 4 | Set 5 | Total | Report |
|---|---|---|---|---|---|---|---|---|---|---|---|
| 7 Jun | 16:40 | Germany | 3–2 | Serbia | 25–20 | 16–25 | 26–28 | 26–24 | 15–9 | 108–106 | P2 Report |
| 8 Jun | 16:10 | Serbia | 3–2 | Australia | 22–25 | 14–25 | 25–21 | 25–21 | 15–9 | 101–101 | P2 Report |
| 9 Jun | 16:10 | Canada | 2–3 | Serbia | 17–25 | 26–24 | 21–25 | 28–26 | 12–15 | 104–115 | P2 Report |

==== Pool 9 ====
- Venue: Multiusos de Gondomar, Gondomar, Portugal

*All times are Western European Summer Time (UTC+01:00).

| Date | Time | | Score | | Set 1 | Set 2 | Set 3 | Set 4 | Set 5 | Total | Report |
|---|---|---|---|---|---|---|---|---|---|---|---|
| 14 Jun | 18:00 | Brazil | 2–3 | Serbia | 25–17 | 22–25 | 25–17 | 20–25 | 12–15 | 104–99 | P2 Report |
| 15 Jun | 19:00 | Portugal | 2–3 | Serbia | 25–21 | 15–25 | 22–25 | 32–30 | 9–15 | 103–116 | P2 Report |
| 16 Jun | 15:00 | China | 1–3 | Serbia | 17–25 | 22–25 | 27–25 | 18–25 | | 84–100 | P2 Report |

==== Pool 14 ====
- Venue: PalaLido, Milan, Italy

*All times are Central European Summer Time (UTC+02:00).

| Date | Time | | Score | | Set 1 | Set 2 | Set 3 | Set 4 | Set 5 | Total | Report |
|---|---|---|---|---|---|---|---|---|---|---|---|
| 21 Jun | 20:20 | Italy | 3–0 | Serbia | 26–24 | 25–19 | 25–22 | | | 76–65 | P2 Report |
| 22 Jun | 17:00 | Poland | 3–2 | Serbia | 32–30 | 21–25 | 25–21 | 19–25 | 15–11 | 112–112 | P2 Report |
| 23 Jun | 17:00 | Argentina | 3–0 | Serbia | 25–17 | 25–23 | 25–18 | | | 75–58 | P2 Report |

==== Pool 19 ====
- Venue: Kolodruma, Plovdiv, Bulgaria

*All times are Eastern European Summer Time (UTC+03:00).

| Date | Time | | Score | | Set 1 | Set 2 | Set 3 | Set 4 | Set 5 | Total | Report |
|---|---|---|---|---|---|---|---|---|---|---|---|
| 28 Jun | 17:00 | Iran | 3–1 | Serbia | 25–23 | 26–28 | 25–22 | 25–19 | | 101–92 | P2 Report |
| 29 Jun | 17:00 | United States | 3–1 | Serbia | 14–25 | 25–20 | 29–27 | 26–24 | | 94–96 | P2 Report |
| 30 Jun | 20:40 | Serbia | 3–0 | Bulgaria | 25–23 | 25–12 | 25–18 | | | 75–53 | P2 Report |

=== 2019 FIVB Intercontinental Olympic Qualification ===
==== Pool C ====
- Venue: PalaFlorio, Bari, Italy

*All times are Central European Summer Time (UTC+02:00).

| Date | Time | | Score | | Set 1 | Set 2 | Set 3 | Set 4 | Set 5 | Total | Report |
|---|---|---|---|---|---|---|---|---|---|---|---|
| 9 Aug | 18:00 | Australia | 1–3 | Serbia | 28–26 | 19–25 | 19–25 | 30–32 | | 96–108 | P2 Report |
| 10 Aug | 18:00 | Serbia | 3–0 | Cameroon | 25–22 | 25–19 | 25–13 | | | 75–54 | P2 Report |
| 11 Aug | 21:15 | Serbia | 0–3 | Italy | 16–25 | 19–25 | 19–25 | | | 54–75 | P2 Report |

== Friendly matches ==
=== 2015 Preparatory game ===
All times are local Central European Summer Time (UTC+2).

==== Serbia - Bulgaria (22 May 2015) ====
- Venue: SC Voždovac, Belgrade, Serbia

| Date | Time | | Score | | Set 1 | Set 2 | Set 3 | Set 4 | Set 5 | Total | Report |
|---|---|---|---|---|---|---|---|---|---|---|---|
| 22 May | 17:00 | Serbia | 2–3 | Bulgaria | 25–23 | 22–25 | 25–17 | 27–29 | 8–15 | 107–109 | Report |

==== Serbia - Bulgaria (23 May 2015) ====
| Date | Time | | Score | | Set 1 | Set 2 | Set 3 | Set 4 | Set 5 | Total | Report |
|---|---|---|---|---|---|---|---|---|---|---|---|
| 23 May | 10:00 | Serbia | 2–3 | Bulgaria | 23–25 | 25–23 | 20–25 | 25–17 | 13–15 | 106–105 | Report |

==== Serbia - Netherlands (17 Sep 2015) ====
- Venue: Pionir Hall, Belgrade, Serbia

| Date | Time | | Score | | Set 1 | Set 2 | Set 3 | Set 4 | Set 5 | Total | Report |
|---|---|---|---|---|---|---|---|---|---|---|---|
| 17 Sep | 19:00 | Serbia | 3–2 | Netherlands | 25–19 | 23–25 | 25–22 | 18–25 | 15–10 | 106–101 | Report |

==== Serbia - Netherlands (19 Sep 2015) ====
| Date | Time | | Score | | Set 1 | Set 2 | Set 3 | Set 4 | Set 5 | Total | Report |
|---|---|---|---|---|---|---|---|---|---|---|---|
| 19 Sep | 20:00 | Serbia | 2–3 | Netherlands | 20–25 | 25–23 | 22–25 | 25–19 | 18–20 | 110–112 | Report |

==== Serbia - Bulgaria (28 Dec 2015) ====
- Venue: Pionir Hall, Belgrade, Serbia

| Date | Time | | Score | | Set 1 | Set 2 | Set 3 | Set 4 | Set 5 | Total | Report |
|---|---|---|---|---|---|---|---|---|---|---|---|
| 28 Dec | 20:30 | Serbia | 3–1 | Bulgaria | 25–22 | 22–25 | 27–25 | 26–24 | | 100–96 | Report |

==== Serbia - Bulgaria (29 Dec 2015) ====
| Date | Time | | Score | | Set 1 | Set 2 | Set 3 | Set 4 | Set 5 | Total | Report |
|---|---|---|---|---|---|---|---|---|---|---|---|
| 29 Dec | 18:00 | Serbia | 3–0 | Bulgaria | 25–21 | 25–23 | 25–16 | | | 75–60 | Report |

=== 2016 Preparatory game ===
All times are local Central European Summer Time (UTC+2).

==== Italy - Serbia (8 June 2016) ====
- Venue: Palatrieste, Trieste, Italy

| Date | Time | | Score | | Set 1 | Set 2 | Set 3 | Set 4 | Set 5 | Total | Report |
|---|---|---|---|---|---|---|---|---|---|---|---|
| 8 Jun | 20:30 | Italy | 0–3 | Serbia | 20–25 | 27–29 | 20–25 | | | 67–79 | Report |

==== Italy - Serbia (9 June 2016) ====
- Venue: Palazzetto dello Sport, Cividale del Friuli, Italy

| Date | Time | | Score | | Set 1 | Set 2 | Set 3 | Set 4 | Set 5 | Total | Report |
|---|---|---|---|---|---|---|---|---|---|---|---|
| 9 Jun | 20:00 | Italy | 3–1 | Serbia | 25–23 | 29–27 | 22–25 | 25–23 | | 101–98 | Report |

=== 2017 Preparatory game ===
All times are local Central European Summer Time (UTC+2).

==== Slovenia - Serbia (20 May 2017) ====
- Venue: Šoštanj Topolšica, Šoštanj, Slovenia

| Date | Time | | Score | | Set 1 | Set 2 | Set 3 | Set 4 | Set 5 | Total | Report |
|---|---|---|---|---|---|---|---|---|---|---|---|
| 20 May | 19:00 | Slovenia | 1–3 | Serbia | 20–25 | 19–25 | 26–24 | 18–25 | | 83–99 | Report |

==== Slovenia - Serbia (21 May 2017) ====
- Venue: Stozice, Ljubljana, Slovenia

| Date | Time | | Score | | Set 1 | Set 2 | Set 3 | Set 4 | Set 5 | Total | Report |
|---|---|---|---|---|---|---|---|---|---|---|---|
| 21 May | | Slovenia | 2–3 | Serbia | 16–25 | 21–25 | 25–11 | 25–20 | 28–30 | 115–111 | |

==== Serbia - Slovenia (17 Aug 2017) ====
- Venue: Master Zemun, Belgrade, Serbia

| Date | Time | | Score | | Set 1 | Set 2 | Set 3 | Set 4 | Set 5 | Total | Report |
|---|---|---|---|---|---|---|---|---|---|---|---|
| 17 Aug | 18:00 | Serbia | 3–2 | Slovenia | 30–28 | 25–19 | 20–25 | 19–25 | 15–6 | 109–103 | Report |

==== Serbia - Slovenia (18 Aug 2017) ====
| Date | Time | | Score | | Set 1 | Set 2 | Set 3 | Set 4 | Set 5 | Total | Report |
|---|---|---|---|---|---|---|---|---|---|---|---|
| 18 Aug | 17:30 | Serbia | 3–1 | Slovenia | 25–22 | 27–25 | 25–23 | 18–25 | | 95–95 | Report |

=== 2018 Preparatory game ===
All times are local Central European Summer Time (UTC+2).

==== France - Serbia (31 Aug 2018) ====
- Venue: AccorHotels Arena, Paris, France

| Date | Time | | Score | | Set 1 | Set 2 | Set 3 | Set 4 | Set 5 | Total | Report |
|---|---|---|---|---|---|---|---|---|---|---|---|
| 31 Aug | | France | 2–3 | Serbia | 25–15 | 25–21 | 21–25 | 25–27 | 13–15 | 109–103 | |

==== France - Serbia (2 Sep 2018) ====
- Venue: Pierre de Coubertin, Paris, France

| Date | Time | | Score | | Set 1 | Set 2 | Set 3 | Set 4 | Set 5 | Total | Report |
|---|---|---|---|---|---|---|---|---|---|---|---|
| 2 Sep | 17:30 | France | 3–2 | Serbia | 26–28 | 25–27 | 25–19 | 25–13 | 15–12 | 116–99 | Report |

=== 2019 Preparatory game ===
- Venue: SC Impuls, Belgrade, Serbia

All times are local Central European Summer Time (UTC+2).

==== Serbia - Bulgaria (24 May 2019) ====
| Date | Time | | Score | | Set 1 | Set 2 | Set 3 | Set 4 | Set 5 | Total | Report |
|---|---|---|---|---|---|---|---|---|---|---|---|
| 24 May | 18:00 | Serbia | 1–4 | Bulgaria | 18–25 | 26–24 | 16–25 | 19–25 | 23–25 | 102–124 | Report |

==== Serbia - Bulgaria (25 May 2019) ====
| Date | Time | | Score | | Set 1 | Set 2 | Set 3 | Set 4 | Set 5 | Total | Report |
|---|---|---|---|---|---|---|---|---|---|---|---|
| 25 May | 18:00 | Serbia | 3–2 | Bulgaria | 25–22 | 24–26 | 25–18 | 21–25 | 22–20 | 117–111 | Report |

==== Serbia - Bulgaria (24 July 2019) ====
| Date | Time | | Score | | Set 1 | Set 2 | Set 3 | Set 4 | Set 5 | Total | Report |
|---|---|---|---|---|---|---|---|---|---|---|---|
| 24 Jul | 18:00 | Serbia | 2–3 | Bulgaria | 23–25 | 25–23 | 25–21 | 21–25 | 22–25 | 116–119 | Report |

==== Serbia - Bulgaria (25 July 2019) ====
| Date | Time | | Score | | Set 1 | Set 2 | Set 3 | Set 4 | Set 5 | Total | Report |
|---|---|---|---|---|---|---|---|---|---|---|---|
| 25 Jul | 18:30 | Serbia | 3–2 | Bulgaria | 26–28 | 25–22 | 25–19 | 25–19 | 18–25 | 119–113 | Report |

== Friendly Tournament ==
=== 2016 Memoriał Huberta Jerzego Wagnera ===
- Venue: Tauron Arena, Kraków, Poland

All times are local Central European Summer Time (UTC+2).

| Date | Time | | Score | | Set 1 | Set 2 | Set 3 | Set 4 | Set 5 | Total | Report |
|---|---|---|---|---|---|---|---|---|---|---|---|
| 17 May | 17:30 | Serbia | 3–2 | Belgium | 25–22 | 16–25 | 25–21 | 23–25 | 15–12 | 104–105 | Report |
| 18 May | 17:30 | Serbia | 2–3 | Bulgaria | 20–25 | 25–16 | 14–25 | 25–22 | 14–16 | 98–104 | Report |
| 19 May | 20:30 | Serbia | 3–2 | Poland | 17–25 | 22–25 | 25–18 | 25–19 | 15–11 | 104–98 | Report |

=== 2019 Memoriał Huberta Jerzego Wagnera ===
- Venue: Tauron Arena, Kraków, Poland

All times are local Central European Summer Time (UTC+2).

| Date | Time | | Score | | Set 1 | Set 2 | Set 3 | Set 4 | Set 5 | Total | Report |
|---|---|---|---|---|---|---|---|---|---|---|---|
| 1 Aug | 17:00 | Serbia | 1–3 | Poland | 22–25 | 18–25 | 25–22 | 22–25 | | 87–97 | Report |
| 2 Aug | 20:30 | Serbia | 3–1 | Finland | 21–25 | 25–20 | 25–21 | 28–26 | | 99–92 | Report |
| 3 Aug | 12:00 | Serbia | 0–3 | Brazil | 22–25 | 20–25 | 14–25 | | | 56–75 | Report |

== See also ==
- Serbia men's national volleyball team
- Matches of Serbian men's volleyball national team conducted by Slobodan Kovač
