= Ivan Perović =

Serbian volleyball player (born 1991)

Personal information
- Full name: Ivan Perović
- Nationality: (Serbia) Serbian
- Born: September 17, 1991 (age 35); Kragujevac, SR Serbia, SFR Yugoslavia
- Height: 193 cm (6 ft 4 in)
- Weight: 93 kg (205 lb)
- Spike: 343 cm (135 in)
- Block: 318 cm (125 in)

Volleyball information
- Position: Outside hitter
- Number: 6, 17

Ivan Perović (Serbian Cyrillic: Иван Перовић, Serbian pronunciation: [[ǐʋan pěrɔʋit͡ɕ]], born 17 September 1991) is a Serbian volleyball player who formerly competed under OK Nis and VK Spartak, and GEN-i-Volley. He is 193 cm tall, and he is playing as an outside hitter.

== Clubs ==
Club	Country	-Year
OK Radnički Kragujevac	(Serbia)	2008—2010
VGSK Veliko Gradište	(Serbia)	2010—2011
OK Radnički Kragujevac	(Serbia)	2011—2015
OK Niš	(Serbia)	2015—2016
VK Spartak UJS Komarno	(Slovakia)	2016
Zahra Al Mina	(Lebanon)	2017
GEN-i Volley Nova Gorica	(Slovenia)	2017—2018
OK Radnički Kragujevac	(Serbia)	2018—
