= OK Crvena Zvezda =

Serbian volleyball club

Odbojkaški klub Crvena zvezda
- Full name: Odbojkaški klub Crvena zvezda
- Short name: OK Crvena zvezda
- Nickname: Zvezda (The Star)
- Founded: 4 March 1945; 81 years ago
- Ground: USC Voždovac (Capacity: 2,100)
- League: Volleyball League of Serbia

Uniforms
Home	Away

Odbojkaški klub Crvena zvezda (English: Volleyball Club Red Star) is a professional volleyball club based in Belgrade, Serbia. Its name Crvena zvezda means Red Star and it is part of the SD Crvena zvezda sports society. It has a men's and a women's section. It is the most successful team in Serbian volleyball in women's category. OK Crvena zvezda is ranked 27th (as of October 2016) in the Men's European clubs ranking.

== Team roster 2026–27 ==
=== Men ===
Coach: Carlos Schwanke Brazil

Name	Nationality
1 Bogdan Tomašević	Serbia
2 Gjorgi Gjorgiev	North Macedonia
3 Jovan Popović	Serbia
4 Nemanja Petrić	Serbia
5 Andrej Lukić	Serbia
7 Luka Radović	Serbia
9 Vukašin Ristić	Serbia
10 Črtomir Bošnjak	Slovenia
11 Mladen Janković	Serbia
15 Tomislav Dokić	Serbia
18 Dušan Petrović	Serbia
21 Stefan Soko	Serbia
22 Bogdan Miladinović	Serbia
29 Nikola Milošević	Serbia
34 Strahinja Sekulić	Serbia
45 Aleksandar Bošnjak	Serbia
99 Alija Bekrić	Serbia

=== Women ===
Coach: Danilo Stokuća Serbia

Name	Nationality
1 Irena Jovanović	Serbia
2 Tamara Stupar	Serbia
3 Isidora Jakovljević	Serbia
4 Tea Stojanović	Serbia
6 Anđela Marinković	Serbia
7 Taylor Bruns	United States
9 Katarina Stanković	Serbia
10 Magdalena Obućina	Serbia
11 Nađa Antonović	Serbia
13 Milana Stanković	Serbia
14 Tsvetomira Mitkova	Bulgaria
15 Ana Savić	Serbia
17 Ljubica Kecman	Serbia
18 Višnja Žigić	Serbia
19 Anđelija Zirojević	Serbia
22 Teodora Zec	Serbia

== Achievements and titles ==
=== Men ===
National Championship – 13

- Yugoslav Volleyball Championship:
  - Winners (5): 1951, 1954, 1956, 1957, 1973–74
  - Runners-up (2): 1952, 1975–76
  - Third place (9): 1948, 1949, 1955, 1959, 1962, 1968–69, 1969–70, 1972–73, 1974–75
- Volleyball League of Serbia and Montenegro:
  - Winners (1): 2002–03
  - Runners-up (5): 1991–92, 1993–94, 1994–95, 1996–97, 1998–99
  - Third place (2): 2004–05, 2005–06
- Volleyball League of Serbia:
  - Winners (7): 2007–08, 2011–12, 2012–13, 2013–14, 2014–15, 2015–16, 2023–24
  - Runners-up (3): 2009–10, 2016–17, 2018–19
  - Third place (3): 2008–09, 2010–11, 2017–18

National Cup – 14

- Yugoslav Cup:
  - Winners (5): 1959–60, 1972, 1973, 1975, 1991
  - Runners-up (2): 1971, 1989
- Serbia and Montenegro Cup:
  - Winners (3): 1993, 1997, 1999
  - Runners-up (3): 1992, 1998, 2003
- Serbian Cup:
  - Winners (6): 2008–09, 2010–11, 2012–13, 2013–14, 2015–16, 2018–19
  - Runners-up (1): 2017–18

National Super Cup – 6

- Serbian Super Cup:
  - Winners (6): 2011, 2012, 2013, 2014, 2016, 2024
  - Runners-up (3): 1993, 2015, 2019

International

- CEV Challenge Cup:
  - Quarter-finalists (3): 1997–98, 2013–14, 2014–15

=== Women ===
National Championship – 28

- Yugoslav Volleyball Championship:
  - Winners (18): 1959, 1962, 1963, 1964, 1965, 1966, 1967, 1968–69, 1969–70, 1970–71, 1971–72, 1974–75, 1975–76, 1976–77, 1977–78, 1978–79, 1981–82, 1982–83
  - Runners-up (10): 1956, 1958, 1960, 1961, 1967–68, 1972–73, 1973–74, 1979–80, 1980–81, 1990–91
- Volleyball League of Serbia and Montenegro:
  - Winners (5): 1991–92, 1992–93, 2001–02, 2002–03, 2003–04
  - Third place (1): 2005–06
- Volleyball League of Serbia:
  - Winners (5): 2009–10, 2010–11, 2011–12, 2012–13, 2021–22
  - Runners-up (4): 2007–08, 2008–09, 2013–14, 2017–18
  - Third place (2): 2006–07, 2014–15

National Cup – 18

- Yugoslav Cup:
  - Winners (10): 1960, 1961, 1962, 1972, 1974, 1976–77, 1979, 1982, 1983, 1991
  - Runners-up (3): 1973, 1980, 1986
- Serbia and Montenegro Cup:
  - Winners (2): 1992, 2002
  - Runners-up (4): 1993, 1997, 1999, 2004
- Serbian Cup:
  - Winners (6): 2009–10, 2010–11, 2011–12, 2012–13, 2013–14, 2021–22
  - Runners-up (4): 2006–07, 2008–09, 2017–18, 2018–19

National Super Cup – 1

- Serbian Super Cup:
  - Winners (1): 2022
  - Runners-up (3): 2013, 2014, 2019

International

- CEV Women's Champions League:
  - Fourth place (1): 1975–76
  - Quarter-finalists (2): 1962–63, 1963–64
- Women's CEV Cup:
  - Runners-up (1): 2009–10
  - Third place (1): 2007–08
  - Semi-finalists (1): 2010–11
  - Quarter-finalists (1): 2008–09
- CEV Women's Challenge Cup:
  - Third place (1): 1985–86

== Notable players ==
Men

- (Socialist Federal Republic of Yugoslavia) Aleksandar Boričić
- (Socialist Federal Republic of Yugoslavia) Nikola Matijašević
- (Socialist Federal Republic of Yugoslavia) Slobodan Lozančić
- (Socialist Federal Republic of Yugoslavia) Vladimir Bošnjak
- (Socialist Federal Republic of Yugoslavia) Živojin Vračarić
- (Socialist Federal Republic of Yugoslavia) Miodrag Mitić
- (Serbia and Montenegro) Dejan Brđović
- (Serbia and Montenegro) Vladimir Batez
- (Serbia and Montenegro) Ratko Pavličević
- (Serbia and Montenegro) Edin Škorić
- (Serbia and Montenegro) Rajko Jokanović
- (Serbia and Montenegro) Željko Tanasković
- (Serbia and Montenegro) Bojan Janić
- (Serbia and Montenegro) Milan Vasić
- (Serbia and Montenegro) Dejan Bojović
- (Serbia and Montenegro) Marko Samardžić
- (Serbia and Montenegro) Vlado Petković
- (Serbia and Montenegro) Nikola Kovačević
- (Serbia) Dragan Stanković
- (Serbia) Milan Rašić
- (Serbia) Tomislav Dokić
- (Serbia) Miloš Terzić
- (Serbia) Mihajlo Mitić
- (Serbia) Nemanja Jakovljević
- (Serbia) Dušan Petković
- (Serbia) Filip Vujić
- (Serbia) Filip Stoilović
- (Serbia) Lazar Koprivica
- (Serbia) Maksim Buculjević
- (Serbia) Aleksandar Okolić
- (Serbia) Aleksandar Blagojević
- (Serbia) Vuk Milutinović
- (Serbia) Nemanja Mašulović
- (Serbia) Nikola Meljanac
- (Serbia) Dušan Nikolić

Women

- (Russia) Olga Shkurnova
- (Serbia and Montenegro) Branka Sekulić
- (Bulgaria) Neli Marinova
- (Serbia and Montenegro) Maja Simanić
- (Serbia and Montenegro) Anja Spasojević
- (Serbia and Montenegro) Ivana Đerisilo
- (Serbia and Montenegro) Slađana Erić
- (Serbia and Montenegro) Dragana Ilić
- (Serbia and Montenegro) Maja Ognjenović
- (Serbia) Ivana Isailović
- (Cuba) Liana Mesa
- (Serbia) Stefana Veljković
- (Serbia) Ivana Nešović
- (Serbia) Nina Rosić
- (Serbia) Bojana Drča
- (Serbia) Nađa Ninković
- (Serbia) Jelena Blagojević
- (Serbia) Sanja Malagurski
- (Serbia) Tamara Rakić
- (Serbia) Ana Bjelica
- (Serbia) Jovana Stevanović
- (Hungary) Júlia Milovits
- (Serbia) Mina Popović
- (Serbia) Ljubica Kecman
- (Serbia) Teodora Pušić
- (Serbia) Vesna Čitaković
- (Serbia) Bojana Milenković
- (Serbia) Tijana Malešević
- (Bosnia and Herzegovina) Dajana Bošković
- (Serbia) Ana Živojinović
- (Serbia) Jelena Stojić
