= Slobodan Kovač =

Serbian volleyball player and coach

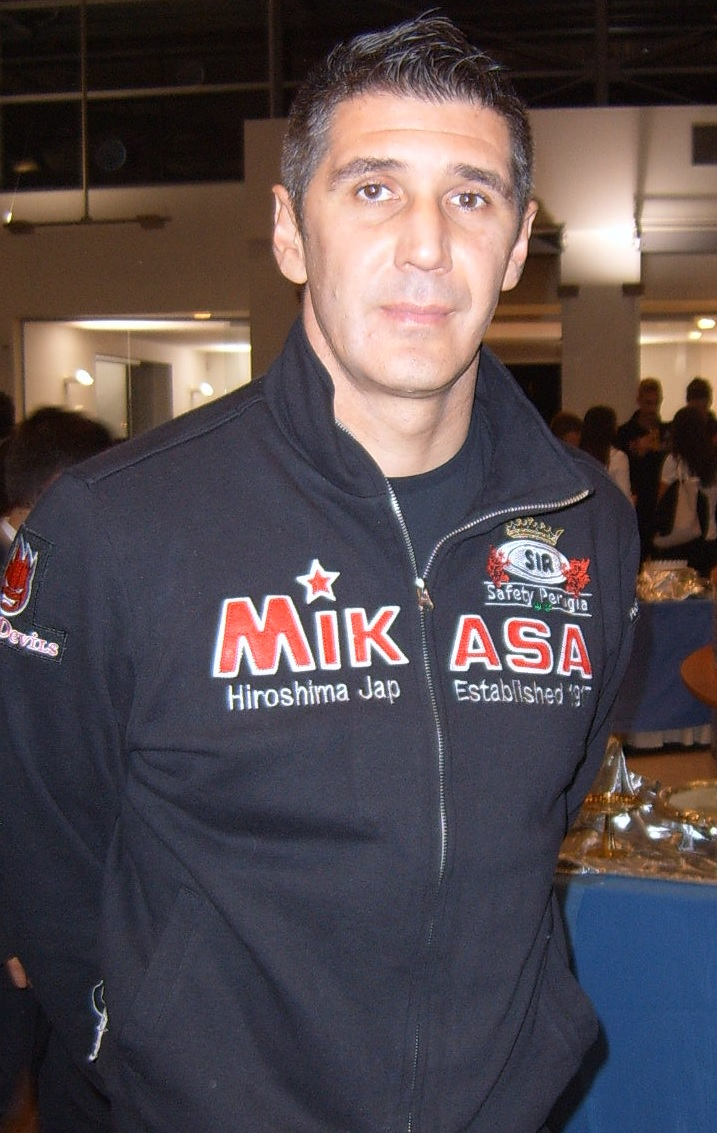
- Kovač as Sir Safety Perugia head coach.

Personal information
- Nickname: Boba
- Born: 13 September 1967 (age 59); Veliko Gradište, SR Serbia, SFR Yugoslavia
- Height: 2.00 m (6 ft 7 in)

Coaching information
Previous teams coached
Years	Teams
2008–2010; 2010–2014; 2014–2015; 2015–2016; 2016–2018; 2017–2018; 2018–2019; 2019–2021; 2019–2020; 2020–2021; 2021–2022; 2023–2024; 2024–2026; 2025–	Radnički Kragujevac; Sir Safety Perugia; Iran; Sir Safety Perugia; Halkbank Ankara; Slovenia; Belogorie Belgorod; Serbia; Jastrzębski Węgiel; Top Volley Cisterna; Skra Bełchatów; Halkbank Ankara; Fenerbahçe; Turkey

Volleyball information
- Position: Outside hitter

Career
Years	Teams
1983–1985; 1985–1988; 1988–1992; 1992–1993; 1993–1994; 1994–1995; 1995–1999; 1999–2002; 2002–2003; 2003; 2004; 2004–2006; 2006–2007	VGSK Veliko Gradište; Kolubara; Vojvodina Novi Sad; Gallo Gioia Del Colle; Aris Thessaloniki; ASPC Gioia del Colle; Volley Lube; Taranto Volley; A.S. Pallavolo Agnone; GFC Ajaccio VB; Indeco Molfetta; Shahrdari Urmia; Radnički Kragujevac

National team
1991; 1996–2003	(Socialist Federal Republic of Yugoslavia) Yugoslavia (Federal Republic of Yugoslavia) Serbia and Montenegro
Honours
Men's volleyball
Representing Serbia and Montenegro
Olympic Games
Gold medal – first place	2000 Sydney
Bronze medal – third place	1996 Atlanta
CEV European Championship
Silver medal – second place	1997 Netherlands
Bronze medal – third place	1995 Greece
Head coach Iran
Asian Games
Gold medal – first place	2014 South Korea
Head coach Serbia
CEV European Championship
Gold medal – first place	2019 Belgium/France/Netherlands/Slovenia

Slobodan Kovač (Serbian Cyrillic: Слободан Ковач; born 13 September 1967) is a Serbian professional volleyball coach of Turkey men's national volleyball team (since 2025), and also former player, Olympic Champion at Sydney 2000, bronze medallist at the Olympic Games in Atlanta 1996 and the 2019 European Championship winner.

== Career ==
=== As a coach ===
In 2014, he was appointed new head coach of the Iranian national volleyball team until the Olympic Games Rio 2016. That same year he led Iranian team to its first gold medal at Asian games. In 2017, he took charge of the Slovenian national volleyball team.

From 2010 to 2014, Kovač was head coach of the Italian team, Sir Safety Perugia. In 2016, he became new head coach of Halkbank Ankara.

== Honours ==
=== As a player ===
- Domestic
  - 1988–89 Yugoslavian Championship, with Vojvodina Novi Sad
  - 1991–92 Serbia and Montenegro Cup, with Vojvodina Novi Sad
  - 1991–92 Serbia and Montenegro Championship, with Vojvodina Novi Sad

=== As a coach ===
- CEV Challenge Cup
  - 2018–19 – with Belogorie Belgorod
- Domestic
  - 2008–09 Serbian Championship, with Radnički Kragujevac
  - 2009–10 Serbian Championship, with Radnički Kragujevac
  - 2016–17 Turkish Championship, with Halkbank Ankara
  - 2017–18 Turkish Cup, with Halkbank Ankara
  - 2017–18 Turkish Championship, with Halkbank Ankara
  - 2024–25 Turkish Cup, with Fenerbahçe İstanbul

=== Individual awards ===
- 2008: Coach of the year in Serbia
- 2009: Coach of the year in Serbia
- 2010: Coach of the year in Serbia
- 2013: Coach of the year in Italy
- 2014: Coach of the year in Italy
- 2019: CEV – Coach of the year
- 2019: Coach of the Year by the Olympic Committee of Serbia

== See also ==
- Matches of Serbian men's volleyball national team conducted by Slobodan Kovač

Sporting positions
Preceded by (Serbia) Nikola Grbić	Head coach of Serbia; 2019–2021	Succeeded by (Montenegro) Igor Kolaković
Preceded by (Italy) Andrea Giani	Head coach of Slovenia; 2017–2018	Succeeded by (Italy) Alberto Giuliani
Preceded by (Argentina) Julio Velasco	Head coach of Iran; 2014–2015	Succeeded by (Argentina) Raúl Lozano
