= Milija Mrdak =

Serbian volleyball player (born 1991)

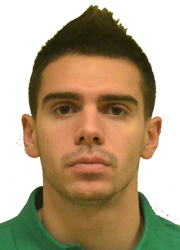

Personal information
- Nationality: Kraljevo, Serbia
- Born: 26 October 1991 (age 35)
- Height: 201 cm (6 ft 7 in)
- Weight: 86 kg (190 lb)
- Spike: 350 cm (138 in)
- Block: 335 cm (132 in)

Volleyball information
- Number: 24 (national team)

Career
Years	Teams
2015–2017; 2017–2018	OK Partizan Beograd; Benfica

National team
2015–	Serbia
Honours
U19 World Championship
Gold medal – first place	2009 Italy

Milija Mrdak (born 26 October 1991) is a Serbian male volleyball player who plays for the Serbia national team.
