= OK Radnički Kragujevac =

Serbian volleyball club

Radnički Kragujevac
- Full name: Odbojkaški klub Radnički
- Short name: OK Radnički
- Founded: 1945; 81 years ago
- Ground: Jezero Hall (Capacity: 5,320)
- Manager: Aleksa Brđović
- League: Volleyball League of Serbia
- Website: Club home page

Uniforms
Home	Away

Odbojkaški klub Radnički (Serbian Cyrillic: Одбојкашки клуб Раднички), commonly referred to as Radnički Kragujevac, is a men's professional volleyball club based in Kragujevac, Serbia. It's a part of the Radnički multi-sports company. It plays in the Volleyball League of Serbia.

== History ==
Volleyball club Radnički was founded in 1945. Throughout its history, the club was competing in all leagues of the former Yugoslavia. The first major success the club has achieved during the 1980s of the 20th century when they have won second place in the Yugoslav Second Division. The coach of the team at that time was Nikola Matijašević. Already the first season, the club have won fifth place. After the breakup of Yugoslavia, the club has achieved inferior results to qualify for the 1st B National League where he for played 3 seasons. In season 2003/2004 the club has promoted to the 1st A National League, where he today competes. In 1996 Doctor Miroslav Stojanović - Džiga was appointed as the club president. His arrival marked the beginning of great success and a new "golden age" of the club. Already the first season, the club wins fifth place.

In season 2006/07 the club wins second place in the national championship and qualifies for the CEV Cup. The same season the club qualifies for the final tournament of the Serbian National Cup, for the first time in his history. The club continues with the excellent results in the 2007–08 season when the club reaches the CEV Cup quarter-finals and becomes the national championship runners-up. That same season the club wins their first major trophy, the Serbian National Cup. Finally, in season 2008/09 in Jezero Hall in front of around 4.200 spectators, Radnički beats Vojvodina in Play-Offs game 5 and wins the National Championship.

== Trophy lineups ==
- 2008 - National Cup Winners - Dino Radivojević, Borislav Stamenić, Jasmin Hadžifejzović, Mirko Ristović, Vladan Aleksić, Milan Mijalković, Hari Nakovski, Milan Ilić, Ilija Ivović, Vladimir Čedić, Nemanja Stevanović, Nikola Gjorgiev, Srđan Pantelić, Igor Jovanović, Nemanja Radović - coach Slobodan Galešev.
- 2009 - Champions of Serbia - Ognjen Duduj, Nemanja Radović, Igor Jovanović, Nenad Simeunović, Aleksa Brđović, Bojan Perović, Ilija Ivović, Hari Nakovski, Milan Ilić, Janko Ivović, Vladimir Čedić, Nemanja Stevanović, Nikola Gjorgiev, Srđan Pantelić, Ivan Perović - coach Slobodan Kovač.
- 2010 - Champions of Serbia - Zoran Jovanović, Dušan Petković, Igor Jovanović, Nemanja Radović, Arsenije Protić, Ivan Perović, Ilija Ivović, Konstantin Čupković, Milan Ilić, Janko Ivović, Vladimir Čedić, Marko Maksimović, Nemanja Opačić, Srđan Pantelić, Nemanja Stevanović - coach Slobodan Kovač.
- 2025 - Champions of Serbia - Danilo Gledić, Dusan Lopar, Vladimir Gajović, Branislav Banković, Ognjen Jovanović, Đorđe Vidović, Dusan Jović, Jovan Vukomirović, Ivan Ćirović, Marko Milićević, Milutin Nejić, Ognjen Vidović, Relja Sekulić, Milan Krstić, Ivan Kostić, Filip Damnjanović, Ognjen Stević - coach Aleksa Brđović.
- 2026 - Champions of Serbia - Danilo Gledić, Dušan Lopar, Vladimir Gajović, Branislav Banković, Ognjen Jovanović, Jovan Vukomirović, Ivan Ćirović, Davide Kovač, Edvin Hadžimehmedović, Milutin Nejić, Mladen Bojović, Ognjen Vidović, Relja Sekulić, Ivan Kostić, Ognjen Stević, Milan Zivanović, Lazar Stašević - coach Aleksa Brđović.

== Famous players ==
- (Serbia) Dejan Brđović
- (Serbia) Slobodan Kovač
- (Serbia) Aleksandar Gigović

== Honours ==
- Serbian Volleyball League:

- Winners (4): 2008-09, 2009-10, 2024-25, 2025-26

- Serbian Volleyball Cup:

- Winners (2): 2007-08, 2024-25
