= Aleksandar Mitrović (volleyball) =

Serbian volleyball player

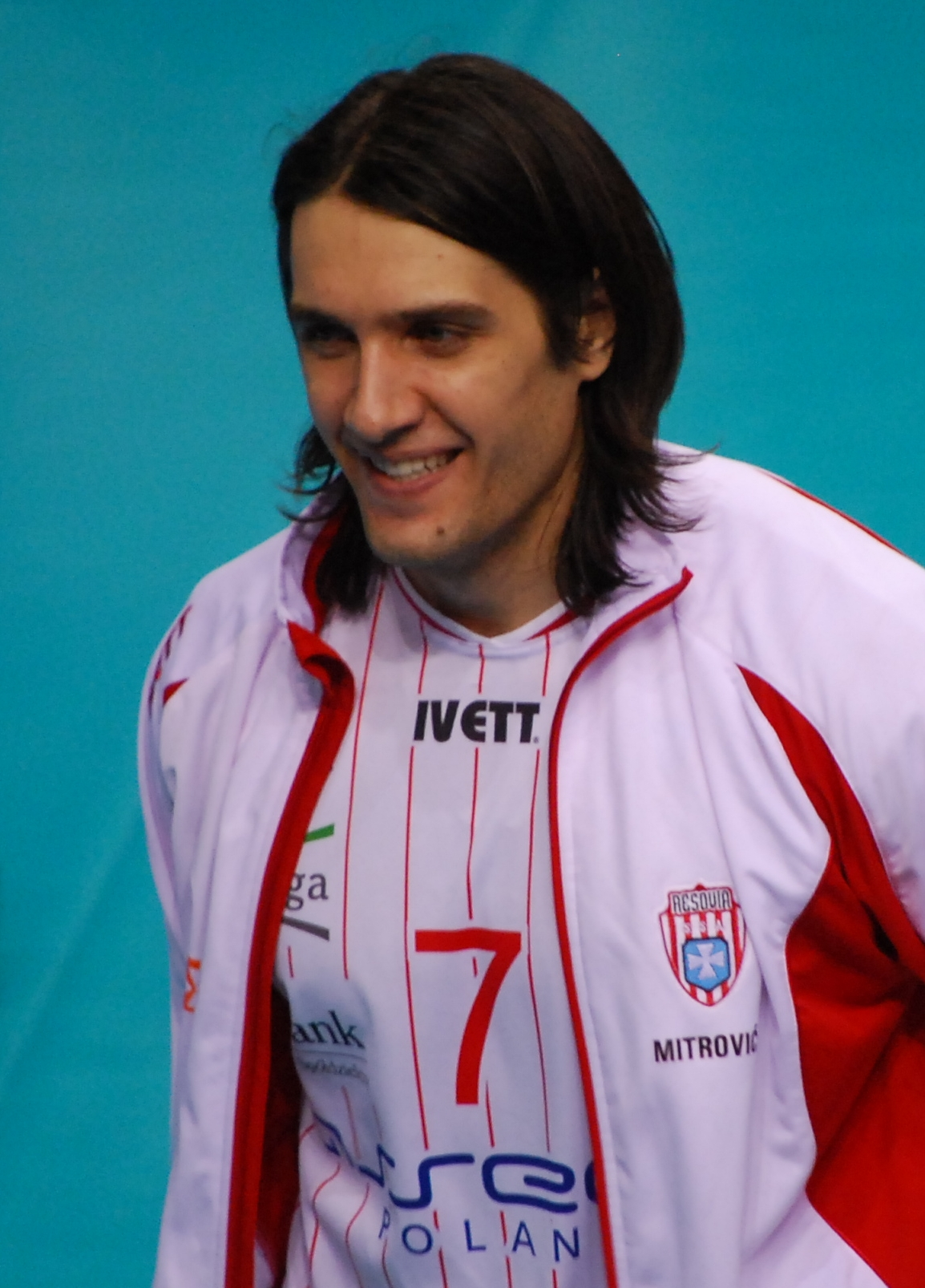

Personal information
- Full name: Aleksandar Mitrović
- Born: September 24, 1982 (age 44); Kruševac, SFR Yugoslavia
- Height: 1.93 m (6 ft 4 in)
- Weight: 93 kg (205 lb)
- Spike: 324 cm (128 in)
- Block: 350 cm (140 in)

Volleyball information
- Position: Receiver
- Current club: (France) Nice Volley-Ball

National team
Serbia
Honours
Men's volleyball
Representing Serbia and Montenegro
European Championship
Bronze medal – third place	2005 Serbia/Italy	Team
World League
Silver medal – second place	2005 Belgrade	Team
Bronze medal – third place	2004 Rome	Team

Aleksandar Mitrović (Serbian Cyrillic: Александар Митровић; born September 24, 1982) is a Serbian volleyball player. He started playing volleyball in OK Kruševac, in his hometown. He was a member of the national team representing Serbia and Montenegro at the 2004 Summer Olympics in Athens.

== Career ==
- 1998–2000 (Serbia and Montenegro) OK Kruševac
- 2000–2004 (Serbia and Montenegro) OK Partizan
- 2004–2005 (Italy) Pallavolo Mantoue
- 2005–2006 (Italy) Latina Volley
- 2006–2007 (Turkey) Halkbank Ankara
- 2007–2009 (Poland) ASSECO Resovia Rzeszów
- 2009 (Russia) Yaroslavich
- 2009–2010 (Serbia) OK Partizan
- 2010–2011 (France) GFCO Ajaccio
- 2011–2012 (Argentina) UPCN San Huan Voley
- 2012–2013 (United Arab Emirates) Al Ain ABUDHABI
- 2013— (France) Nice Volley–Ball
