= Dejan Brđović =

Serbian volleyball player (1966–2015)

Personal information
- Born: 21 February 1966; Kraljevo, Raška District, Serbia
- Died: 21 December 2015 (aged 49); Belgrade, Serbia
- Height: 196 cm (6 ft 5 in)

Volleyball information
- Number: 5
Honours
Men's volleyball
Representing FR Yugoslavia
Olympic Games
Bronze medal – third place	1996 Atlanta	Team

Dejan Brđović (Serbian Cyrillic: Дејан Брђовић, 21 February 1966 – 21 December 2015) was a Serbian volleyball player who competed for Yugoslavia in the 1996 Summer Olympics and won the bronze medal. He played three matches.

== Personal life ==
Brđović was born in Kraljevo, Serbia, Yugoslavia. He died in Belgrade, Serbia on 21 December 2015, at the age of 49.

Brđović's son, Aleksa, plays for the Serbian national volleyball team. His daughter, Aleksandra, also plays volleyball.
