= Volleyball League of Serbia =

- Sport: Volleyball
- Founded: 2006
- No. of teams: 12
- Country: Serbia
- Confederation: CEV
- Continent: Europe
- Most recent champion: Radnički (4th title) (2025-26)
- Most titles: Vojvodina (19 titles)
- Level on pyramid: 1
- Related competitions: CEV Champions League; CEV Cup; CEV Challenge Cup
- Website: ossrb-web.dataproject.com

The Serbian Superliga (Serbian: Суперлига Србије / Superliga Srbije) is the highest level of men's volleyball in Serbia and it is organized by Serbian Volleyball Federation. Serbia Volleyball League is currently contested by 12 clubs.

== 2026–27 teams ==
=== Map ===
Locations of the 2026–27 Serbian Superliga teams

Serbian Superliga
Team	City	Stadium
Crvena zvezda	Belgrade	Voždovac Sports Center
Niš	Niš	Čair Sports Center
Mladi radnik	Požarevac	Požarevac Sports Center
Jedinstvo	Stara Pazova	Stara Pazova Hall
Takovo	Gornji Milanovac	Breza Hall
Radnički	Kragujevac	Jezero Hall
VGSK	Veliko Gradište	Veliko Gradište Sports Hall
Partizan	Belgrade	Aleksandar Nikolić Hall
Spartak	Subotica	Dudova Šuma Hall
Vojvodina	Novi Sad	SPC Vojvodina
Ribnica	Kraljevo	Kraljevo Sports Hall
Karađorđe	Topola	OŠ Karađorđe

== Champions ==
=== Including titles in Serbia and Montenegro ===
- 1992 Vojvodina
- 1993 Vojvodina
- 1994 Vojvodina
- 1995 Vojvodina
- 1996 Vojvodina
- 1997 Vojvodina
- 1998 Vojvodina
- 1999 Vojvodina
- 2000 Vojvodina
- 2001 Budvanska Rivijera Budva
- 2002 Budućnost
- 2003 Crvena zvezda
- 2004 Vojvodina
- 2005 Budućnost
- 2006 Budućnost

Club	Titles	Years won
Vojvodina	10	1992, 1993, 1994, 1995, 1996, 1997, 1998, 1999, 2000, 2004
Budućnost	3	2002, 2005, 2006
Crvena zvezda	1	2003
Budvanska Rivijera Budva	1	2001

=== Including titles in Serbia ===
- 2007 Vojvodina
- 2008 Crvena zvezda
- 2009 Radnički Kragujevac
- 2010 Radnički Kragujevac
- 2011 Partizan
- 2012 Crvena zvezda
- 2013 Crvena zvezda
- 2014 Crvena zvezda
- 2015 Crvena zvezda
- 2016 Crvena zvezda
- 2017 Vojvodina
- 2018 Vojvodina
- 2019 Vojvodina
- 2020 Vojvodina
- 2021 Vojvodina
- 2022 Vojvodina
- 2023 Partizan
- 2024 Crvena zvezda
- 2025 Radnički Kragujevac
- 2026 Radnički Kragujevac

Club	Titles	Years won
Vojvodina	7	2007, 2017, 2018, 2019, 2020, 2021, 2022
Crvena zvezda	7	2008, 2012, 2013, 2014, 2015, 2016, 2024
Radnički Kragujevac	4	2009, 2010, 2025, 2026
Partizan	2	2011, 2023

=== All-time ===
Club	Titles	Years won
Vojvodina	19	1988, 1989, 1992, 1993, 1994, 1995, 1996, 1997, 1998, 1999, 2000, 2004, 2007, 2017, 2018, 2019, 2020, 2021, 2022
Crvena zvezda	13	1951, 1954, 1956, 1957, 1974, 2003, 2008, 2012, 2013, 2014, 2015, 2016, 2024
Partizan	12	1946, 1947, 1949, 1950, 1953, 1967, 1973, 1978, 1990, 1991, 2011, 2023
Jugoslavija	4	1958, 1959, 1960, 1961
Radnički Kragujevac	4	2009, 2010, 2025, 2026
Spartak Subotica	1	1975
Klek Zrenjanin	1	1972
VGSK	1	1980
Železničar Belgrade	1	1964

== Serbian volleyball clubs in European and regional competitions ==
CEV Challenge Cup

Club	Winner	Years
Vojvodina	1	2015

BVA Cup

Club	Winner	Years
Spartak Subotica	1	2023
Spartak Ljig	1	2015
Ribnica	1	2010
