= 1990 FIVB Men's Volleyball World Championship squads =

This article shows the rosters of the participating teams at the 1990 FIVB Men's Volleyball World Championship in Brazil from 18–28 October 1990.

== Italy ==
Head coach: Julio Velasco

No.	Name	Date of birth	Height	Weight	1990 club
1	Andrea Gardini	1 October 1965 (aged 25)	202 cm (6 ft 8 in)		Messaggero Ravenna
2	Marco Martinelli	9 October 1965 (aged 25)	200 cm (6 ft 7 in)		Philips Modena
4	Ferdinando De Giorgi	10 October 1961 (aged 29)	178 cm (5 ft 10 in)		Gabeca Montichiari
5	Paolo Tofoli	14 August 1966 (aged 24)	188 cm (6 ft 2 in)		Sisley Treviso
6	Roberto Masciarelli	5 September 1963 (aged 27)	196 cm (6 ft 5 in)		Messaggero Ravenna
7	Andrea Anastasi	8 October 1960 (aged 30)	183 cm (6 ft 0 in)		Sisley Treviso
8	Marco Bracci	23 August 1966 (aged 24)	197 cm (6 ft 6 in)		Maxicono Parma
9	Lorenzo Bernardi	11 August 1968 (aged 22)	199 cm (6 ft 6 in)		Sisley Treviso
10	Luca Cantagalli	8 December 1965 (aged 24)	198 cm (6 ft 6 in)		Sisley Treviso
11	Andrea Zorzi	29 July 1965 (aged 25)	201 cm (6 ft 7 in)		Mediolanum Milano
12	Andrea Lucchetta	25 November 1962 (aged 27)	199 cm (6 ft 6 in)		Mediolanum Milano
13	Andrea Giani	22 April 1970 (aged 20)	196 cm (6 ft 5 in)		Maxicono Parma

== Cuba ==
Head coach: Orlando Samuels

No.	Name	Date of birth	Height	Weight	1990 club
1	Joel Charles Despaigne	2 July 1966 (aged 24)	190 cm (6 ft 3 in)	84 kg (185 lb)	S. Cuba
2	Idalberto Valdés	14 April 1967 (aged 23)	197 cm (6 ft 6 in)	96 kg (212 lb)	P. Habana
3	Lázaro Beltrán Rizo	27 February 1964 (aged 26)	190 cm (6 ft 3 in)	86 kg (190 lb)	C. Habana
4	Félix Millán Casanova	13 October 1967 (aged 23)	198 cm (6 ft 6 in)	89 kg (196 lb)	C. Habana
5	Raúl Diago Izquierdo	1 June 1967 (aged 23)	191 cm (6 ft 3 in)	80 kg (180 lb)	Matanzas
6	Abel B. Sarmientos	27 February 1962 (aged 28)	194 cm (6 ft 4 in)	86 kg (190 lb)	Camaguey
7	Manuel Torres Torres	9 August 1962 (aged 28)	190 cm (6 ft 3 in)	83 kg (183 lb)	C. Habana
8	Lázaro Marín Ortega	30 March 1967 (aged 23)	200 cm (6 ft 7 in)	92 kg (203 lb)	C. Habana
9	Rodolfo Sánchez	25 May 1969 (aged 21)	199 cm (6 ft 6 in)	87 kg (192 lb)	P. Rio
15	Freddy Brooks	10 August 1969 (aged 21)	187 cm (6 ft 2 in)	81 kg (179 lb)	Guantanamo
16	Ricardo Vantes	21 April 1968 (aged 22)	191 cm (6 ft 3 in)	83 kg (183 lb)	Camaguey
17	Ihosvany Hernández	6 August 1972 (aged 18)	203 cm (6 ft 8 in)	91 kg (201 lb)	C. Habana

== Soviet Union ==
Head coach: Viacheslav Platanov

No.	Name	Date of birth	Height	Weight	1990 club
1	Oleg Shatunov	1 February 1967 (aged 23)	200 cm (6 ft 7 in)	100 kg (220 lb)	Automobilist
2	Andrey Kuznetsov	14 April 1968 (aged 22)	199 cm (6 ft 6 in)	95 kg (209 lb)	CSKA Moskva
3	Alexander Shadchin	17 April 1969 (aged 21)	204 cm (6 ft 8 in)	91 kg (201 lb)	Shakhter
4	Ruslan Olikhver	24 April 1969 (aged 21)	201 cm (6 ft 7 in)	98 kg (216 lb)	Radiotekhnik
5	Igor Runov	8 February 1963 (aged 27)	202 cm (6 ft 8 in)	98 kg (216 lb)	CSKA Moskva
6	Evgueni Krasilnikov	7 April 1965 (aged 25)	191 cm (6 ft 3 in)	89 kg (196 lb)	Dinamo
8	Dimitri Fomin	21 January 1968 (aged 22)	200 cm (6 ft 7 in)	94 kg (207 lb)	CSKA Moskva
9	Igor Naumov	28 April 1967 (aged 23)	200 cm (6 ft 7 in)	94 kg (207 lb)	Iskra
10	Yuri Sapega	1 January 1965 (aged 25)	196 cm (6 ft 5 in)	96 kg (212 lb)	
11	Yaroslav Antonov	10 January 1963 (aged 27)	198 cm (6 ft 6 in)	95 kg (209 lb)	CSKA Moskva
12	Yuriy Cherednik	25 July 1966 (aged 24)	203 cm (6 ft 8 in)	95 kg (209 lb)	Automobilist
13	Viktor Sidelnikov	15 January 1963 (aged 27)	191 cm (6 ft 3 in)	84 kg (185 lb)	Automobilist

== Brazil ==
Head coach: Bebeto de Freitas ("Bebeto")

No.	Name	Date of birth	Height	Weight	1990 club
1	Marcelo Teles Negrão	10 October 1972 (aged 18)	198 cm (6 ft 6 in)	90 kg (200 lb)	Banespa
2	Jorge Edson de Brito	13 October 1966 (aged 24)	192 cm (6 ft 4 in)	90 kg (200 lb)	Pirelli
3	Giovane F. Gavio	7 February 1970 (aged 20)	190 cm (6 ft 3 in)	90 kg (200 lb)	Banespa
4	Marco Antonio Pompeu	11 February 1968 (aged 22)	199 cm (6 ft 6 in)	82 kg (181 lb)	Sadia
5	Paulo Da Silva Paulao	24 November 1963 (aged 26)	202 cm (6 ft 8 in)	93 kg (205 lb)	Chapeto
6	Mauricio C. Lima	27 January 1968 (aged 22)	184 cm (6 ft 0 in)	77 kg (170 lb)	Banespa
7	Janelson Carvalho	24 March 1969 (aged 21)	195 cm (6 ft 5 in)	75 kg (165 lb)	Sadia
8	Roberto Bosch Nogueras Filho	31 May 1965 (aged 25)	187 cm (6 ft 2 in)	79 kg (174 lb)	Sadia
9	Antonio C. Gouvela	20 April 1965 (aged 25)	196 cm (6 ft 5 in)	93 kg (205 lb)	Pirelli
11	Wagner Antonio da Rocha	11 July 1965 (aged 25)	197 cm (6 ft 6 in)	88 kg (194 lb)	Telesp
12	De Melo Alcidio Cidao	24 November 1964 (aged 25)	196 cm (6 ft 5 in)	90 kg (200 lb)	Pirelli
14	Alexandre Samuel Tande	20 March 1970 (aged 20)	200 cm (6 ft 7 in)	85 kg (187 lb)	Banespa

== Bulgaria ==
Head coach: Ivan Seferinov

No.	Name	Date of birth	Height	Weight	1990 club
1	Assen Galabinov	13 July 1959 (aged 31)	200 cm (6 ft 7 in)	98 kg (216 lb)	Levski-Spartak
2	Lyudmil Naydenov	4 September 1970 (aged 20)	194 cm (6 ft 4 in)	84 kg (185 lb)	Levski-Spartak
3	Borislav Kiossev	3 August 1961 (aged 29)	200 cm (6 ft 7 in)	98 kg (216 lb)	CSKA Sofia
4	Lyubomir Ganev	6 October 1965 (aged 25)	210 cm (6 ft 11 in)	99 kg (218 lb)	CSKA Sofia
5	Ventsislav Todorov	13 March 1967 (aged 23)	187 cm (6 ft 2 in)	85 kg (187 lb)	CSKA Sofia
6	Dimo Tonev	2 July 1964 (aged 26)	205 cm (6 ft 9 in)	92 kg (203 lb)	Levski-Spartak
7	Nikolay Jeliazkov	26 February 1970 (aged 20)	198 cm (6 ft 6 in)	89 kg (196 lb)	CSKA Sofia
8	Plamen Hristov	5 April 1965 (aged 25)	188 cm (6 ft 2 in)	78 kg (172 lb)	CSKA Sofia
10	Georgi Tunchev	10 July 1969 (aged 21)	195 cm (6 ft 5 in)	89 kg (196 lb)	CSKA Sofia
11	Nayden Naydenov	25 May 1967 (aged 23)	197 cm (6 ft 6 in)	89 kg (196 lb)	Levski-Spartak
13	Ivaylo Gavrilov	30 December 1970 (aged 19)	198 cm (6 ft 6 in)	80 kg (180 lb)	Slavia

== Argentina ==
Head coach: Luis Fernando Muchaga

No.	Name	Date of birth	Height	Weight	1990 club
1	Waldo Kantor	11 January 1960 (aged 30)	178 cm (5 ft 10 in)	75 kg (165 lb)	(Italy) Catania
2	Raul Quiroga	26 January 1962 (aged 28)	198 cm (6 ft 6 in)	93 kg (205 lb)	(Italy) Montichiari
3	Hugo Conte	14 April 1963 (aged 27)	197 cm (6 ft 6 in)	83 kg (183 lb)	(Italy) Catania
4	Esteban Martinez	25 September 1961 (aged 29)	192 cm (6 ft 4 in)	87 kg (192 lb)	(Italy) Catania
5	Jon Uriarte	15 October 1961 (aged 29)	199 cm (6 ft 6 in)	93 kg (205 lb)	(Italy) Salerno
7	Juan Cuminetti	27 May 1967 (aged 23)	199 cm (6 ft 6 in)	87 kg (192 lb)	(Italy) Bologna
8	Claudio Zulianello	29 May 1965 (aged 25)	198 cm (6 ft 6 in)	91 kg (201 lb)	(Italy) Catania
9	Javier Weber	6 January 1968 (aged 22)	180 cm (5 ft 11 in)	73 kg (161 lb)	(Italy) Palermo
10	Luis Lukach	12 March 1967 (aged 23)	196 cm (6 ft 5 in)	85 kg (187 lb)	(Italy) Modena
11	Gabriel Kunda	20 October 1968 (aged 21)	195 cm (6 ft 5 in)	95 kg (209 lb)	(Italy) Brescia
12	Fernando Borrero	15 December 1968 (aged 21)	201 cm (6 ft 7 in)	88 kg (194 lb)	OSN
13	Fabio Diez	16 November 1965 (aged 24)	191 cm (6 ft 3 in)	80 kg (180 lb)	

== Netherlands ==
Head coach: Henry Brokking

No.	Name	Date of birth	Height	Weight	1990 club
1	Martin Taffer	7 June 1965 (aged 25)	201 cm (6 ft 7 in)		National team
2	Arnold van Ree	23 August 1966 (aged 24)	192 cm (6 ft 4 in)		National team
3	Henk-Jan Held	12 November 1967 (aged 22)	200 cm (6 ft 7 in)		National team
4	Patrik de Raus	28 January 1969 (aged 21)	198 cm (6 ft 6 in)		National team
5	Ron Boudrie	6 April 1960 (aged 30)	201 cm (6 ft 7 in)		National team
6	Bas Koek	7 May 1968 (aged 22)	201 cm (6 ft 7 in)		National team
8	Ron Zwerver	6 June 1967 (aged 23)	200 cm (6 ft 7 in)		National team
9	Avital Selinger	10 March 1959 (aged 31)	175 cm (5 ft 9 in)		National team
10	Edwin Benne	21 April 1965 (aged 25)	208 cm (6 ft 10 in)		National team
14	Martin van der Horst	2 April 1965 (aged 25)	212 cm (6 ft 11 in)		National team

== France ==
Head coach: Gerard Castan

No.	Name	Date of birth	Height	Weight	1990 club
1	Philippe Rossard	2 May 1964 (aged 26)	194 cm (6 ft 4 in)	78 kg (172 lb)	AS Grenoble
3	Herve Mazzon	12 August 1959 (aged 31)	192 cm (6 ft 4 in)	82 kg (181 lb)	VB Frejus
5	Éric Bouvier	5 January 1961 (aged 29)	196 cm (6 ft 5 in)	97 kg (214 lb)	ASU Lyon
6	Christophe Meneau	31 January 1968 (aged 22)	202 cm (6 ft 8 in)	85 kg (187 lb)	AS Grenoble
7	Jean-Marc Jurkoviz	20 April 1963 (aged 27)	195 cm (6 ft 5 in)	82 kg (181 lb)	AS Grenoble
8	Arnaud Josserand	25 September 1963 (aged 27)	198 cm (6 ft 6 in)	94 kg (207 lb)	AS Cannes
9	Laurent Tillie	1 December 1963 (aged 26)	193 cm (6 ft 4 in)	83 kg (183 lb)	AS Cannes
10	Oliver Rossard	31 August 1965 (aged 25)	195 cm (6 ft 5 in)	83 kg (183 lb)	ASU Lyon
11	Patrick Duflos	20 December 1965 (aged 24)	187 cm (6 ft 2 in)	72 kg (159 lb)	Arago Sete
13	Laurent Chambertin	20 September 1966 (aged 24)	189 cm (6 ft 2 in)	94 kg (207 lb)	AS Cannes
15	Philippe Salvan	17 May 1965 (aged 25)	195 cm (6 ft 5 in)	85 kg (187 lb)	ASU Lyon
16	Jean-Michel Vandelannoote	24 January 1966 (aged 24)	196 cm (6 ft 5 in)	82 kg (181 lb)	Arago Sete

== Czechoslovakia ==
Head coach: Rudolf Matejka, Zdenek Pommer

No.	Name	Date of birth	Height	Weight	1990 club
1	Josef Smolka	30 May 1964 (aged 26)	193 cm (6 ft 4 in)	84 kg (185 lb)	Dukla Liberec
2	Milan Džavoronok	1 November 1961 (aged 28)	191 cm (6 ft 3 in)	86 kg (190 lb)	Aero Odolena Voda
3	Zdeněk Kaláb	9 February 1961 (aged 29)	203 cm (6 ft 8 in)	103 kg (227 lb)	(Italy) Città di Castello
4	Bronislav Mikyska	14 August 1963 (aged 27)	205 cm (6 ft 9 in)	101 kg (223 lb)	Zbrojovka Brno
5	Peter Goga	6 October 1965 (aged 25)	189 cm (6 ft 2 in)	75 kg (165 lb)	PSK Praga
7	Martin Skalicka	23 April 1965 (aged 25)	205 cm (6 ft 9 in)	88 kg (194 lb)	Tjzlin
8	Roman Macek	26 September 1962 (aged 28)	186 cm (6 ft 1 in)	84 kg (185 lb)	Tjzlin
9	Štefan Chrtianský	13 May 1962 (aged 28)	200 cm (6 ft 7 in)	93 kg (205 lb)	PSK Bratislava
10	Pavel Barborka	22 September 1961 (aged 29)	198 cm (6 ft 6 in)	85 kg (187 lb)	PSK Praga
11	Igor Stejskal	14 October 1968 (aged 22)	197 cm (6 ft 6 in)	88 kg (194 lb)	Zbrojovka Brno
12	Petr Galis	13 May 1965 (aged 25)	194 cm (6 ft 4 in)	100 kg (220 lb)	PSK Praga
13	Michal Palinek	10 August 1967 (aged 23)	189 cm (6 ft 2 in)	80 kg (180 lb)	Zbrojovka Brno

== Sweden ==
Head coach: Anders Kristiansson

No.	Name	Date of birth	Height	Weight	1990 club
1	Johan Isacsson	13 March 1962 (aged 28)	190 cm (6 ft 3 in)	80 kg (180 lb)	(France) Paris
2	Urban Lennartsson	2 May 1962 (aged 28)	192 cm (6 ft 4 in)	83 kg (183 lb)	(Belgium) Zonhoven
3	Jan Holmqvist	1 December 1964 (aged 25)	191 cm (6 ft 3 in)	80 kg (180 lb)	Lidingö
5	Jan Hedengard	27 May 1963 (aged 27)	185 cm (6 ft 1 in)	80 kg (180 lb)	(Italy) Cuneo
6	Niklas Tornberg	4 May 1971 (aged 19)	190 cm (6 ft 3 in)	84 kg (185 lb)	Sollentuna
8	Anders Kvist		188 cm (6 ft 2 in)	80 kg (180 lb)	Kungalv
9	Mikael Kjellstrom	2 August 1971 (aged 19)	202 cm (6 ft 8 in)	85 kg (187 lb)	(Denmark) Holte
10	Per-Anders Saaf	11 April 1965 (aged 25)	200 cm (6 ft 7 in)	87 kg (192 lb)	(Italy) Bologna
11	Bengt Gustafson	17 May 1963 (aged 27)	195 cm (6 ft 5 in)	90 kg (200 lb)	(Italy) Treviso
12	Hakan Bjorne	13 March 1964 (aged 26)	201 cm (6 ft 7 in)	94 kg (207 lb)	(Italy) Spoleto
13	Lars Nilsson	11 March 1965 (aged 25)	201 cm (6 ft 7 in)	90 kg (200 lb)	(Italy) Falconara Marittima
14	Peter Tholse	6 May 1965 (aged 25)	202 cm (6 ft 8 in)	88 kg (194 lb)	(Italy) Mantova

== Japan ==
Head coach: Masayuki Minami

No.	Name	Date of birth	Height	Weight	1990 club
1	Tagashi Narita	6 October 1969 (aged 21)	185 cm (6 ft 1 in)	70 kg (150 lb)	
2	Kazutomo Yoneyama	12 September 1961 (aged 29)	180 cm (5 ft 11 in)	70 kg (150 lb)	
3	Yuichi Nakagalchi	2 November 1967 (aged 22)	193 cm (6 ft 4 in)	87 kg (192 lb)	
5	Masayoshi Manabe	21 August 1963 (aged 27)	180 cm (5 ft 11 in)	87 kg (192 lb)	
6	Masafumi Ohura	22 September 1969 (aged 21)	188 cm (6 ft 2 in)	82 kg (181 lb)	
8	Masay Ogino	8 January 1970 (aged 20)	197 cm (6 ft 6 in)	85 kg (187 lb)	
9	Satashi Sensui	8 February 1967 (aged 23)	195 cm (6 ft 5 in)	93 kg (205 lb)	
10	Katzyuki Minami	30 September 1970 (aged 20)	200 cm (6 ft 7 in)	80 kg (180 lb)	
11	Shigeru Aoyama	3 April 1969 (aged 21)	188 cm (6 ft 2 in)	78 kg (172 lb)	
12	Hiromichi Kageyama	28 August 1967 (aged 23)	200 cm (6 ft 7 in)	84 kg (185 lb)	
14	Hidayuky Otake	16 July 1967 (aged 23)	206 cm (6 ft 9 in)	85 kg (187 lb)	
15	Masayuki Izumikawa	22 January 1971 (aged 19)	196 cm (6 ft 5 in)	85 kg (187 lb)	
16	Kambayashi Masafumi	16 April 1964 (aged 26)	207 cm (6 ft 9 in)	106 kg (234 lb)	
17	Kuriuzawa Junichi	25 February 1965 (aged 25)	193 cm (6 ft 4 in)	75 kg (165 lb)	
18	Makinouchi Kazuhico	13 April 1966 (aged 24)	201 cm (6 ft 7 in)	88 kg (194 lb)	

== Canada ==
Canada squad:

Head coach: Brian Watson

No.	Name	Date of birth	Height	Weight	1990 club
1	Brad Willock	15 September 1962 (aged 28)	199 cm (6 ft 6 in)	92 kg (203 lb)	
2	Bill Knight	21 May 1964 (aged 26)	196 cm (6 ft 5 in)	86 kg (190 lb)	
3	John Barrett	11 August 1962 (aged 28)	198 cm (6 ft 6 in)	101 kg (223 lb)	(France) Bordeaux
5	Mark Dunn	9 September 1965 (aged 25)	184 cm (6 ft 0 in)	86 kg (190 lb)	
6	Allan Coulter	15 December 1959 (aged 30)	192 cm (6 ft 4 in)	87 kg (192 lb)	
8	Rod Walsh	18 July 1961 (aged 29)	195 cm (6 ft 5 in)	96 kg (212 lb)	(France) Riom
9	Mark Albert	15 November 1961 (aged 28)	201 cm (6 ft 7 in)	89 kg (196 lb)	
11	Kevin Boyles	17 September 1967 (aged 23)	193 cm (6 ft 4 in)	81 kg (179 lb)	
12	Randy Gingera	25 April 1968 (aged 22)	190 cm (6 ft 3 in)	86 kg (190 lb)	
13	Christopher Frehlick	10 February 1962 (aged 28)	189 cm (6 ft 2 in)	88 kg (194 lb)	
14	Terry Gagnon	3 December 1962 (aged 27)	189 cm (6 ft 2 in)	84 kg (185 lb)	

== United States ==
Head coach: Bill Neville Bill (Jim Coleman?)

No.	Name	Date of birth	Height	Weight	1990 club
1	Allen Allen	24 May 1967 (aged 23)	191 cm (6 ft 3 in)	100 kg (220 lb)	
3	Jon Root	10 July 1964 (aged 26)	196 cm (6 ft 5 in)	93 kg (205 lb)	
4	Mark Jones	1 October 1968 (aged 22)	198 cm (6 ft 6 in)	83 kg (183 lb)	
5	Bryan Ivie	5 May 1969 (aged 21)	201 cm (6 ft 7 in)	98 kg (216 lb)	
6	Uvaldo Acosta	16 May 1965 (aged 25)	180 cm (5 ft 11 in)	86 kg (190 lb)	
7	Craig Buck	24 August 1958 (aged 32)	203 cm (6 ft 8 in)	91 kg (201 lb)	
8	Scott Fortune	23 January 1966 (aged 24)	198 cm (6 ft 6 in)	87 kg (192 lb)	
9	Bob Samuelson	30 July 1966 (aged 24)	196 cm (6 ft 5 in)	99 kg (218 lb)	
10	Dan Hanan	13 March 1968 (aged 22)	198 cm (6 ft 6 in)	91 kg (201 lb)	
11	Javier Gaspar	15 September 1966 (aged 24)	183 cm (6 ft 0 in)	75 kg (165 lb)	
14	Mark Arnold	27 March 1964 (aged 26)	198 cm (6 ft 6 in)	93 kg (205 lb)	
15	Trevor Schirman	8 November 1967 (aged 22)	197 cm (6 ft 6 in)	98 kg (216 lb)	

== South Korea ==
Head coach: Jin Jeun-Talk

No.	Name	Date of birth	Height	Weight	1990 club
2	Yoon Jong-Il	26 August 1969 (aged 21)	205 cm (6 ft 9 in)	95 kg (209 lb)	Hanyang University
3	Chang Yoong-Chang	11 September 1960 (aged 30)	195 cm (6 ft 5 in)	88 kg (194 lb)	Coryo Sec.
4	Han Yang-Suk	13 February 1962 (aged 28)	190 cm (6 ft 3 in)	84 kg (185 lb)	
5	Lee Kyung-Suk	8 March 1961 (aged 29)	188 cm (6 ft 2 in)	86 kg (190 lb)	Coryo Sec.
6	Ma Nak-Jil	4 April 1968 (aged 22)	188 cm (6 ft 2 in)	82 kg (181 lb)	Sungkyum Kwan Univiversity
7	Hong Hae-Cheon	17 July 1964 (aged 26)	184 cm (6 ft 0 in)	80 kg (180 lb)	Armi
8	Hoh Jin-Soo	21 March 1965 (aged 25)	188 cm (6 ft 2 in)	80 kg (180 lb)	Hyunoal
9	Ha Jong-Hwa	28 August 1969 (aged 21)	195 cm (6 ft 5 in)	85 kg (187 lb)	Hanyang University
10	Shin Joung-Chul	14 March 1964 (aged 26)	178 cm (5 ft 10 in)	72 kg (159 lb)	Armi
11	Lee Sang-Yeol	9 March 1966 (aged 24)	195 cm (6 ft 5 in)	90 kg (200 lb)	Keum-Sung
12	Chung Euy-Tak	11 June 1961 (aged 29)	194 cm (6 ft 4 in)	87 kg (192 lb)	Coryo Sec.
13	Kang Sung-Hyung	7 May 1970 (aged 20)	189 cm (6 ft 2 in)	80 kg (180 lb)	Hanyang University
14	Park Sam-Ryong	19 June 1968 (aged 22)	190 cm (6 ft 3 in)	83 kg (183 lb)	Seul City

== Cameroon ==
Head coach: Vassili Netchai

No.	Name	Date of birth	Height	Weight	1990 club
1	Jean René Akono	4 August 1967 (aged 23)	190 cm (6 ft 3 in)	80 kg (180 lb)	Amacam
2	Olivier Mietcheu	25 August 1976 (aged 14)	188 cm (6 ft 2 in)	75 kg (165 lb)	(France)
3	Yagnye Lappa	20 May 1965 (aged 25)	188 cm (6 ft 2 in)	85 kg (187 lb)	(France)
4	Alain Denguessi	3 October 1965 (aged 25)	190 cm (6 ft 3 in)	85 kg (187 lb)	(France)
5	Roger Bowen Kango	12 January 1959 (aged 31)	190 cm (6 ft 3 in)	87 kg (192 lb)	Sonel
6	Gerard Sadey	22 February 1962 (aged 28)	190 cm (6 ft 3 in)	81 kg (179 lb)	Amacam
8	Elysee Ossoso		188 cm (6 ft 2 in)	86 kg (190 lb)	Amacam
9	Robert Monvoisin		187 cm (6 ft 2 in)	83 kg (183 lb)	(France)
10	Jacques Yoko Kwed	24 April 1972 (aged 18)	197 cm (6 ft 6 in)	88 kg (194 lb)	(France)
11	Emesselene M. Bebine	3 June 1969 (aged 21)	189 cm (6 ft 2 in)	82 kg (181 lb)	Amacam
12	Jean Fillis Tchamot	10 January 1962 (aged 28)	180 cm (5 ft 11 in)	85 kg (187 lb)	Sonel
13	Ndoumbe Onana	11 January 1970 (aged 20)	184 cm (6 ft 0 in)	85 kg (187 lb)	Sonel

== Venezuela ==
Head coach: Marcelo Arias

No.	Name	Date of birth	Height	Weight	1990 club
1	Josep Suarez	15 January 1970 (aged 20)	192 cm (6 ft 4 in)	85 kg (187 lb)	Carabobo
2	Vicente Pastor	8 November 1953 (aged 36)	186 cm (6 ft 1 in)	77 kg (170 lb)	Dtto Federal
3	Leobardo Cabrera	14 April 1966 (aged 24)	190 cm (6 ft 3 in)	88 kg (194 lb)	Miranda
5	Mujisa	12 April 1967 (aged 23)	192 cm (6 ft 4 in)	81 kg (179 lb)	Lara
6	Luis Mieres	13 August 1965 (aged 25)	196 cm (6 ft 5 in)	78 kg (172 lb)	Sucre
7	Jose Perez	15 May 1970 (aged 20)	188 cm (6 ft 2 in)	78 kg (172 lb)	Arague
8	Larry Sulbaran	15 October 1967 (aged 23)	192 cm (6 ft 4 in)	86 kg (190 lb)	Zulia
9	Algimiro Palencia	3 July 1963 (aged 27)	182 cm (6 ft 0 in)	74 kg (163 lb)	Zulia
11	Jose Gutierrez	11 February 1971 (aged 19)	190 cm (6 ft 3 in)	76 kg (168 lb)	Barinas
12	Eleardo Cabrera	23 February 1963 (aged 27)	186 cm (6 ft 1 in)	87 kg (192 lb)	Miranda
13	Ricardo Rodriguez	13 February 1970 (aged 20)	188 cm (6 ft 2 in)	82 kg (181 lb)	Dtto Federal
15	Leonardo Velasquez	27 February 1971 (aged 19)	191 cm (6 ft 3 in)	78 kg (172 lb)	Club Ciudad de Bolívar
