= Volleyball at the 1988 Summer Olympics – Men's team rosters =

The following teams and players took part in the men's volleyball tournament at the 1988 Summer Olympics, in Seoul.

== Argentina ==
The following volleyball players represented Argentina:

- Claudio Zulianello
- Daniel Castellani
- Eduardo Martínez
- Alejandro Diz
- Daniel Colla
- Carlos Weber
- Hugo Conte
- Waldo Kantor
- Raúl Quiroga
- Jon Emili Uriarte
- José De Palma
- Juan Carlos Cuminetti

== Brazil ==
The following volleyball players represented Brazil:

- Amauri Ribeiro
- André Felipe Ferreira
- Antônio Carlos Gouveia
- Domingos Lampariello Neto
- José Montanaro
- Leonídio de Pra
- Maurício Lima
- Paulo André Jukoski
- Wagner Rocha
- Paulo Roese
- Renan Dal Zotto
- William Silva

== Bulgaria ==
The following volleyball players represented Bulgaria:

- Borislav Kyosev
- Dimo Tonev
- Ilian Kaziyski
- Konstantin Mitev
- Lyubomir Ganev
- Milcho Milanov
- Nayden Naydenov
- Petko Petkov
- Petko Dragiev
- Plamen Khristov
- Sava Kovachev
- Tsvetan Florov

== France ==
The following volleyball players represented France:

- Philippe Blain
- Jean-Baptiste Martzluff
- Hervé Mazzon
- Éric N'Gapeth
- Éric Bouvier
- Christophe Meneau
- Jean-Marc Jurkovitz
- Laurent Tillie
- Olivier Rossard
- Patrick Duflos
- Alain Fabiani
- Philippe-Marie Salvan

== Italy ==
The following volleyball players represented Italy:

- Alessandro Lazzeroni
- Andrea Gardini
- Andrea Giani
- Andrea Zorzi
- Claudio Galli
- Ferdinando De Giorgi
- Lorenzo Bernardi
- Luca Cantagalli
- Marco Bracci
- Massimo Castagna
- Pier Paolo Lucchetta
- Andrea Lucchetta

== Japan ==
The following volleyball players represented Japan:

- Akihiro Iwashima
- Eizaburo Mitsuhashi
- Hideharu Hara
- Hiromichi Kageyama
- Kazutomo Yoneyama
- Kimio Sugimoto
- Masaki Kaito
- Masayoshi Manabe
- Shunichi Kawai
- Yasunori Kumada
- Yuji Kasama
- Yuzuru Inoue

== Netherlands ==
The following volleyball players represented the Netherlands:

- Martin Teffer
- Pieter Jan Leeuwerink
- Ron Boudrie
- Jan Posthuma
- Ronald Zoodsma
- Ron Zwerver
- Avital Selinger
- Edwin Benne
- Teun Buijs
- Peter Blangé
- Marco Brouwers
- Rob Grabert

== South Korea ==
The following volleyball players represented South Korea:

- Jang Yun-chang
- Choi Cheon-sik
- Han Jang-seok
- Jeong Ui-tak
- Kim Sa-seok
- Kim Ho-cheol
- Lee Chae-on
- Lee Jong-kyung
- Lee Myeong-hak
- Lee Sang-yeol
- Lee Seong-hui
- Park Sam-ryong

== Soviet Union ==
The following volleyball players represented the Soviet Union:

- Yuriy Panchenko
- Andrey Kuznetsov
- Vyacheslav Zaytsev (c)
- Igor Runov
- Vladimir Shkurikhin
- Yevgeny Krasilnikov
- Raimonds Vilde
- Valery Losev
- Yury Sapega
- Oleksandr Sorokalet
- Yaroslav Antonov
- Yury Cherednik

== Sweden ==
The following volleyball players represented Sweden:

- Håkan Björne
- Bengt Gustafson
- Jan Hedengård
- Tomas Hoszek
- Patrik Johansson
- Jannis Kalmazidis
- Mats Karlsson
- Urban Lennartsson
- Anders Lundmark
- Lars Nilsson
- Per-Anders Sääf
- Peter Tholse

== Tunisia ==
The following volleyball players represented Tunisia:

- Abdel Aziz Ben Abdallah
- Abderrazak Ben Massaoud
- Faycal Ben Amara
- Hichem Ben Amira
- Fethi Ghariani
- Hedi Bousarsar
- Lotfi Ben Slimane
- Mohamed Sarsar
- Mourad Tebourski
- Msaddak Lahmar
- Rashid Bousarsar
- Raouf Chenoufi

== United States ==
The following volleyball players represented the United States:

- Troy Tanner
- Dave Saunders
- Jon Root
- Bob Ctvrtlik
- Doug Partie
- Steve Timmons
- Craig Buck
- Scott Fortune
- Ricci Luyties
- Jeff Stork
- Eric Sato
- Karch Kiraly (c)
