= Volleyball at the 1992 Summer Olympics – Men's team rosters =

List of volleyball players

The following teams and players took part in the men's volleyball tournament at the 1992 Summer Olympics, in Barcelona.

== Group A ==
=== Canada ===
The following volleyball players represented Canada:

- Allan Coulter
- Bradley Willock
- Christopher Frehlick
- Gino Brousseau
- Gregory Williscroft
- Marc Albert
- Kent Greves
- Kevin Boyles
- Randal Gingera
- Russell Paddock
- Terry Gagnon
- William Knight

Coach: Brian Watson

=== Spain ===
The following volleyball players represented Spain:

- Ángel Alonso
- Venancio Costa
- Jesús Garrido
- Francisco Hervás
- Héctor López
- Miguel Ángel Maroto
- Rafael Pascual
- Juan Carlos Robles
- Ernesto Rodríguez
- Francisco Sánchez
- Jesús Sánchez
- Benjamín Vicedo

=== France ===
The following volleyball players represented France:

- Arnaud Josserand
- Christophe Meneau
- David Romann
- Éric Bouvier
- Éric Wolfer
- Laurent Chambertin
- Laurent Tillie
- Luc Marquet
- Olivier Lecat
- Olivier Rossard
- Philippe-Marie Salvan
- Rivomanantsoa Andriamaonju

=== Italy ===
The following volleyball players represented Italy:

- Andrea Gardini
- Andrea Giani
- Andrea Lucchetta
- Andrea Zorzi
- Claudio Galli
- Fabio Vullo
- Lorenzo Bernardi
- Luca Cantagalli
- Marco Bracci
- Michele Pasinato
- Paolo Tofoli
- Roberto Masciarelli

=== Japan ===
The following volleyball players represented Japan:

- Akihiko Matsuda
- Hideyuki Otake
- Junichi Kuriuzawa
- Katsuyuki Minami
- Masafumi Oura
- Masaji Ogino
- Masayuki Izumikawa
- Shigeru Aoyama
- Takashi Narita
- Tatsuya Ueta
- Yuichi Nakagaichi
- Katsumi Kawano

=== United States ===
The following volleyball players represented the United States:

- Nick Becker
- Carlos Briceno
- Bob Ctvrtlik
- Scott Fortune
- Dan Greenbaum
- Brent Hilliard
- Bryan Ivie
- Doug Partie
- Bob Samuelson
- Eric Sato
- Jeff Stork
- Steve Timmons

== Group B ==
=== Algeria ===
The following volleyball players represented Algeria:

- El-Tayeb El-Hadj Ben Khelfallah
- Krimo Bernaoui
- Ali Dif
- Faycal Gharzouli
- Mourad Malaoui
- Adel Sennoun
- Mourad Sennoun
- Foudil Taalba
- Faycal Tellouche
- Lies Tizioualou

=== Brazil ===
The following volleyball players represented Brazil:

- Carlão
- Maurício
- Janelson
- Douglas
- Talmo
- Pampa
- Giovane
- Paulão
- Tande
- Amauri
- Jorge Edson
- Marcelo Negrão

=== Cuba ===
The following volleyball players represented Cuba:

- Félix Millán
- Freddy Brooks
- Idalberto Valdés
- Ihosvany Hernández
- Joël Despaigne
- Lázaro Beltrán
- Lázaro Marín
- Nicolas Vives
- Osvaldo Hernández
- Raúl Diago
- Rodolfo Sánchez
- Abel Sarmientos

=== Commonwealth of Independent States (CIS) Unified Team ===
The following volleyball players represented the Unified Team:

- Oleksandr Shadchyn
- Andrey Kuznetsov
- Dmitry Fomin
- Igor Runov
- Oleg Shatunov
- Pavel Shishkin
- Ruslan Olikhver
- Sergey Vladimirovich Gorbunov
- Yevgeny Krasilnikov
- Yury Cherednik
- Yuriy Korov'ianskiy
- Konstantin Ushakov

=== South Korea ===
The following volleyball players represented South Korea:

- Ha Jong-hwa
- Jin Chang-uk
- Gang Seong-hyeong
- Kim Byeong-seon
- Kim Se-jin
- Kim Wan-sik
- Im Do-heon
- Ma Nak-gil
- No Jin-su
- O Uk-hwan
- Park Jong-chan
- Sin Yeong-cheol

=== Netherlands ===
The following volleyball players represented the Netherlands:

- Edwin Benne
- Peter Blangé
- Ron Boudrie
- Henk Jan Held
- Martin van der Horst
- Marko Klok
- Olof van der Meulen
- Jan Posthuma
- Avital Selinger
- Martin Teffer
- Ronald Zoodsma
- Ron Zwerver
