= Sweden at the 1988 Summer Olympics =

- IOC code: SWE
- NOC: Swedish Olympic Committee

in Seoul
- Competitors: 185 (148 men and 37 women) in 23 sports
- Flag bearer: Agneta Andersson
- Medals Ranked 32nd: Gold 0 Silver 4 Bronze 7 Total 11

Summer Olympics appearances (overview)
- 1896; 1900; 1904; 1908; 1912; 1920; 1924; 1928; 1932; 1936; 1948; 1952; 1956; 1960; 1964; 1968; 1972; 1976; 1980; 1984; 1988; 1992; 1996; 2000; 2004; 2008; 2012; 2016; 2020; 2024; 2028

Other related appearances
- 1906 Intercalated Games

Sweden competed at the 1988 Summer Olympics in Seoul, South Korea. 185 competitors, 148 men and 37 women, took part in 113 events in 23 sports. For the first time since the 1900 Summer Olympics, Sweden failed to win a gold medal.

== Medalists ==
Medal	Name	Sport	Event	Date
Silver	Ragnar Skanåker	Shooting	Men's 50 metre pistol	18 September
Silver	Anders Holmertz	Swimming	Men's 200 metre freestyle	19 September
Silver	Birgitta Bengtsson; Marit Söderström	Sailing	Women's 470	27 September
Silver	George Cramne	Boxing	Lightweight	1 October
Bronze	Anders Jarl; Björn Johansson; Jan Karlsson; Michel Lafis	Cycling	Men's team time trial	18 September
Bronze	Tomas Johansson	Wrestling	Men's Greco-Roman 130 kg	21 September
Bronze	Patrik Sjöberg	Athletics	Men's high jump	25 September
Bronze	Stefan Edberg	Tennis	Men's singles	28 September
Bronze	Stefan Edberg; Anders Järryd	Tennis	Men's doubles	29 September
Bronze	Lars Myrberg	Boxing	Light welterweight	29 September
Bronze	Erik Lindh	Table tennis	Men's singles	1 October

== Competitors ==
The following is the list of number of competitors in the Games.

Sport	Men	Women	Total
Archery	3	3	6
Athletics	10	1	11
Boxing	6	–	6
Canoeing	8	4	12
Cycling	5	3	8
Diving	1	1	2
Equestrian	1	3	4
Fencing	10	1	11
Football	17	–	17
Gymnastics	1	0	1
Handball	14	0	14
Judo	2	–	2
Modern pentathlon	3	–	3
Rowing	5	3	8
Sailing	13	2	15
Shooting	9	6	15
Swimming	10	8	18
Synchronized swimming	–	1	1
Table tennis	4	0	4
Tennis	2	1	3
Volleyball	11	0	11
Weightlifting	3	–	3
Wrestling	10	–	10
Total	148	37	185

== Archery ==
The Swedish team continued their archery medal drought, though they took three top eight places in the women's individual, women's team, and men's team categories.

Women's individual competition:

- Jenny Sjöwall — Final (→ 5th place)
- Liselotte Andersson — Quarterfinal (→ 13th place)
- Carina Jonsson — Preliminary Round (→ 59th place)

Men's individual competition:

- Göran Bjerendal — Quarterfinal (→ 15th place)
- Mats Nordlander — Preliminary Round (→ 30th place)
- Gert Bjerendal — Preliminary Round (→ 35th place)

Women's team competition:

- Sjöwall, Andersson, and Jonsson — Final (→ 7th place)

Men's team competition:

- Bjerendal, Nordlander, and Bjerendal — Final (→ 8th place)

== Athletics ==
Sven Nylander was on location and scheduled to start in men's 400m hurdles, but ended up not starting due to illness.

Men's Hammer Throw

- Tore Gustafsson

- Qualifying Heat — 76.44m
- Final — 74.24m (→ 11th place)

- Kjell Bystedt

- Qualifying Heat — no mark (→ did not advance)

Men's Javelin Throw

- Dag Wennlund

- Qualification — 79.66m
- Final — 78.30m (→ 8th place)

- Peter Borglund

- Qualification — 80.16m
- Final — 78.22m (→ 9th place)

Men's Decathlon

- Mikael Olander — 7869 points (→ 17th place)

1. 100 metres — 11.46s
2. Long Jump — 6.75m
3. Shot Put — 16.07m
4. High Jump — 2.00m
5. 400 metres — 51.28s
6. 110m Hurdles — 16.06s
7. Discus Throw — 50.66m
8. Pole Vault — 4.80m
9. Javelin Throw — 72.80m
10. 1.500 metres — 5:02.42s

Men's 50 km Walk

- Bo Gustafsson

- Final — 3'44:49 (→ 7th place)

- Stefan Johansson

- Final — 3'53:34 (→ 20th place)

- Jan Staaf

- Final — DSQ (→ no ranking)

Women's Marathon

- Evy Palm

- Final — 2"34.41 (→ 24th place)

== Cycling ==
Eight cyclists, five men and three women, represented Sweden in 1988.

Men's road race

- Michel Lafis
- Anders Jarl
- Raoul Fahlin

Men's team time trial

- Björn Johansson
- Jan Karlsson
- Michel Lafis
- Anders Jarl

Women's road race

- Marie Höljer — 2:00:52 (→ 7th place)
- Paula Westher — 2:00:52 (→ 26th place)
- Marianne Berglund — 2:00:52 (→ 44th place)

== Diving ==
Men

Athlete	Event	Preliminary		Final	
Athlete	Event	Points	Rank	Points	Rank
Joakim Andersson	3 m springboard	549.99	14	Did not advance	

Women

Athlete	Event	Preliminary		Final	
Athlete	Event	Points	Rank	Points	Rank
Anita Rossing	3 m springboard	414.63	13	Did not advance	

== Fencing ==
Eleven fencers, 10 men and one woman, represented Sweden in 1988.

Men's foil

- Ola Kajbjer
- Eric Strand
- Thomas Åkerberg

Men's team foil

- Peter Åkerberg, Thomas Åkerberg, Ola Kajbjer, Eric Strand, Per Täckenström

Men's épée

- Jerri Bergström
- Péter Vánky
- Otto Drakenberg

Men's team épée

- Johan Bergdahl, Jerri Bergström, Otto Drakenberg, Ulf Sandegren, Péter Vánky

Women's foil

- Kerstin Palm

== Football ==
Summary

Key:

- W – Win D – Draw L – Loss
- A.E.T – After extra time.
- P – Match decided by penalty-shootout.

Team	Event	Group Stage				Quarterfinal	Semifinal	Final / BM	
Team	Event	Opposition Score	Opposition Score	Opposition Score	Rank	Opposition Score	Opposition Score	Opposition Score	Rank
Sweden men's	Men's tournament	Tunisia; D 2–2	China; W 2–0	West Germany; W 2–1	1 Q	Italy; L 1–2 (a.e.t.)	Did not qualify		6

== Handball ==
Summary

Key:

- ET: After extra time
- P – Match decided by penalty-shootout.

Team	Event	Group Stage						Final / BM / Pl.	
Team	Event	Opposition Score	Opposition Score	Opposition Score	Opposition Score	Opposition Score	Rank	Opposition Score	Rank
Sweden men's	Men's tournament	Algeria; W 21–18	Soviet Union; L 18–22	Iceland; W 20–14	United States; W 22–16	Yugoslavia; L 21–25	3 Q	Czechoslovakia; W 27–18	5

== Modern pentathlon ==
Three male pentathletes represented Sweden in 1988.

Men's Individual Competition:

- Svante Rasmuson — 4987 pts (→ 22nd place)
- Jan-Erik Danielsson — 4956 pts (→ 25th place)
- Roderick Martin — 4262 pts (→ 57th place)

Men's Team Competition:

- Rasmuson, Danielsson, and Martin — 14205 pts (→ 12th place)

== Swimming ==
Men's 50m freestyle

- Göran Titus

- Heat — 23.44
- B-Final — 23.28 (→ 9th place)

- Per Johansson

- Heat — 23.12
- B-Final — 23.37 (→ 10th place)

Men's 100m freestyle

- Per Johansson

- Heat — 50.22
- Final — 50.35 (→ 7th place)

- Tommy Werner

- Heat — 50.45
- Final — 50.54 (→ 8th place)

Men's 200m freestyle

- Anders Holmertz

- Heat — 1:49.28
- Final — 1:47.89 (→ Silver Medal)

- Tommy Werner

- Heat — 1:51.96 (→ did not advance, 21st place)

Men's 400m freestyle

- Anders Holmertz

- Heat — 3:50.06
- Final — 3:51.04 (→ 8th place)

- Henrik Jangvall

- Heat — 3:57.41 (→ did not advance, 21st place)

Men's 1500m freestyle

- Stefan Persson

- Heat — 15:24.33 (→ did not advance, 17th place)

Men's 200m Butterfly

- Christer Wallin

- Heat — 2:03.79 (→ did not advance, 26th place)

Men's 4 × 100 m freestyle relay

- Tommy Werner, Richard Milton, Joakim Holmqvist, and Göran Titus

- Heat — 3:23.09

- Per Johansson, Tommy Werner, Joakim Holmqvist, and Göran Titus

- Final — 3:21.07 (→ 5th place)

Men's 4 × 200 m freestyle relay

- Tommy Werner, Christer Wallin, Henrik Jangvall, and Michael Söderlund

- Heat — 7:23.82

- Anders Holmertz, Tommy Werner, Michael Söderlund, and Christer Wallin

- Final — 7:19.10 (→ 6th place)

Women's 50m freestyle

- Helena Åberg

- Heat — 26.67 (→ did not advance, 23rd place)

- Karin Furuhed

- Heat — 26.85 (→ did not advance, 24th place)

Women's 100m freestyle

- Eva Nyberg

- Heat — 57.57 (→ did not advance, 21st place)

- Karin Furuhed

- Heat — 57.97 (→ did not advance, 27th place)

Women's 200m freestyle

- Suzanne Nilsson

- Heat — 2:03.32 (→ did not advance, 18th place)

Women's 100m Backstroke

- Johanna Larsson

- Heat — 1:05.10 (→ did not advance, 22nd place)

Women's 200m Backstroke

- Johanna Larsson

- Heat — 2:18.01 (→ 14th place)
- B-Final — DSQ (→ no ranking)

Women's 100m Butterfly

- Agneta Eriksson

- Heat — 1:03.45 (→ did not advance, 22nd place)

Women's 200m Individual Medley

- Anette Philipsson

- Heat — 2:18.86
- B-Final — 2:19.35 (→ 12th place)

Women's 400m Individual Medley

- Anette Philipsson

- Heat — 4:53.58
- B-Final — 4:52.77 (→ 13th place)

Women's 4 × 100 m freestyle relay

- Agneta Eriksson, Karin Furuhed, Suzanne Nilsson, and Eva Nyberg

- Heat — 3:50.50 (→ did not advance, 9th place)

Women's 4 × 100 m medley relay

- Johanna Larsson, Anna-Karin Persson, Agneta Eriksson, and Eva Nyberg

- Heat — 4:17.72 (→ did not advance, 11th place)

== Synchronized swimming ==
One synchronized swimmer represented Sweden in 1988.

Women's solo

- Marie Jacobsson

== Tennis ==
Men's Singles Competition

- Stefan Edberg → Bronze Medal

- First round — Defeated Horst Skoff (Austria) 7-6 6-2 6-3
- Second round — Defeated Agustín Moreno (Mexico) 6-2 7-6 6-0
- Third round — Defeated Jakob Hlasek (Switzerland) 6-2 6-4 7-6
- Quarterfinals — Defeated Paolo Canè (Italy) 6-1 7-5 6-4
- Semifinals — Lost to Miloslav Mečíř (Czechoslovakia) 6-3 0-6 6-1 4-6 2-6

- Anders Järryd

- First round — Defeated Martin Laurendeau (Canada) 7-6 4-6 7-5 7-5
- Second round — Defeated Andrew Castle (Great Britain) 6-0 6-3 6-1
- Third round — Lost to Carl-Uwe Steeb (Germany) 6-2 5-7 3-6 5-7

Men's Doubles Competition

- Stefan Edberg and Anders Järryd → Bronze Medal

- First Round — Defeated Eric Jelen and Carl Uwe Steeb (West Germany) 6-4 4-6 6-4 6-2
- Second Round — Defeated Mark Gurr and Philip Tuckniss (Zimbabwe) 6-0 6-1 6-4
- Quarterfinals — Defeated Darren Cahill and John Fitzgerald (Australia) 6-3 6-4 6-3
- Semifinals — Lost to Emilio Sánchez and Sergio Casal (Spain) 4-6 6-1 3-6 3-6

Women's Singles Competition

- Catarina Lindqvist

- First Round — Defeated Kumiko Okamoto (Japan) 7-6 7-5
- Second Round — Defeated Nathalie Tauziat (France) 2-6 6-3 6-4
- Third Round — Lost to Manuela Maleeva (Bulgaria) 1-6 0-6

== Volleyball ==
Summary

Team	Event	Preliminary round						Semifinal / Cl.	Final / BM / Pl.	
Team	Event	Opposition Result	Opposition Result	Opposition Result	Opposition Result	Opposition Result	Rank	Opposition Result	Opposition Result	Rank
Sweden men	Men's tournament	South Korea; W 3–2	Soviet Union; L 0–3	Italy; L 2–3	Brazil; L 1–3	Bulgaria; W 3–0	3	5th-8th semifinal Netherlands; L 2–3	7th place final France; W 3–2	7th

=== Men's team competition ===
- Preliminary round (group A)

- Defeated South Korea (3-2)
- Lost to Soviet Union (0-3)
- Lost to Italy (2-3)
- Lost to Brazil (1-3)
- Defeated Bulgaria (3-0)

- Classification Matches

- 5th/8th place: Lost to the Netherlands (2-3)
- 7th/8th place: Defeated France (3-2) → Seventh place

- Team roster

- Urban Lennartsson
- Janni Kalmazidis
- Jan Hedengard
- Mats Karlsson
- Tomas Hoszek
- Anders Lundmark
- Per-Anders Saaf
- Bengt Gustafsson
- Hakan Björne
- Lars Nilsson
- Peter Tholse
- Patrik Johansson

- Head coach: Anders Kristiansson
