= EFD =

EFD may refer to:

- EFD (eFunds Corporation), an American payments service company
- EF Education First–Drapac p/b Cannondale, an American professional cycling team
- Electro-fluid-dynamics
- Electrofluidic display technology
- Ellington Field, an airport in Texas
- Enterprise flash drive
- Entertainment Film Distributors, a British distributor of independent films
- Europe of Freedom and Democracy, a political group in the European Parliament
- European Foundation for Democracy
- Federal Department of Finance (German: Eidgenössisches Finanzdepartement), of Switzerland
- Elite Football Women (Elitfotboll Dam)
- Enterprise function diagrams, in functional software architecture
- Executive Function Disorder, alternative nomenclature for ADD/ADHD
