= Yuri Sapega =

Belarusian volleyball player and coach

Personal information
- Full name: Yury Nikolayevich Sapega
- Nickname: The Poet
- Born: 1 January 1965; Grodno, Byelorussian SSR, Soviet Union
- Died: 29 September 2005 (aged 40); Moscow, Russia
- Height: 1.96 m (6 ft 5 in)

Volleyball information
- Position: Outside hitter
- Number: 9

National team
1984–1991; 1992	Soviet Union; CIS
Honours
Men's volleyball
Representing Soviet Union
Olympic Games
Silver medal – second place	1988 Seoul	Team
World Championship
Silver medal – second place	1986 France	Team
Bronze medal – third place	1990 Brazil	Team
Goodwill Games
Gold medal – first place	1986 Moscow
Friendship Games
Gold medal – first place	1984 Havana
European Championships
Gold medal – first place	1991 Germany

Yuri Sapega (Belarusian: Юрый Мікалаевіч Сапега; Russian: Юрий Николаевич Сапега; 1 January 1965 – 29 September 2005) was a Belarusian professional volleyball player and coach. He was a member of the USSR National Team since 1986 and won a silver medal at the 1988 Summer Olympics, competing for the USSR. He was 194 cm tall and played both as passer-hitter and middle hitter. Sapega was nicknamed "The Poet" for his elegant style.

== Club volleyball ==
Sapega played in Italy for Padova in the 1990s.

== Coaching ==
After ending his career as player, Sapega worked as an assistant coach for the Russian national volleyball team, and later was a manager in the Russian Volleyball Championship.

== Personal life ==
Sapega was born in Grodno. Sapega died in Moscow in 2005 after a heart attack.

== Clubs ==
Club	Country	From	To
CSKA Moscow	Soviet Union	1982–1983	1990–1991
Padova	Italy	1991–1992	1992–1993
