= Arnaud Josserand =

French volleyball player (born 1963)

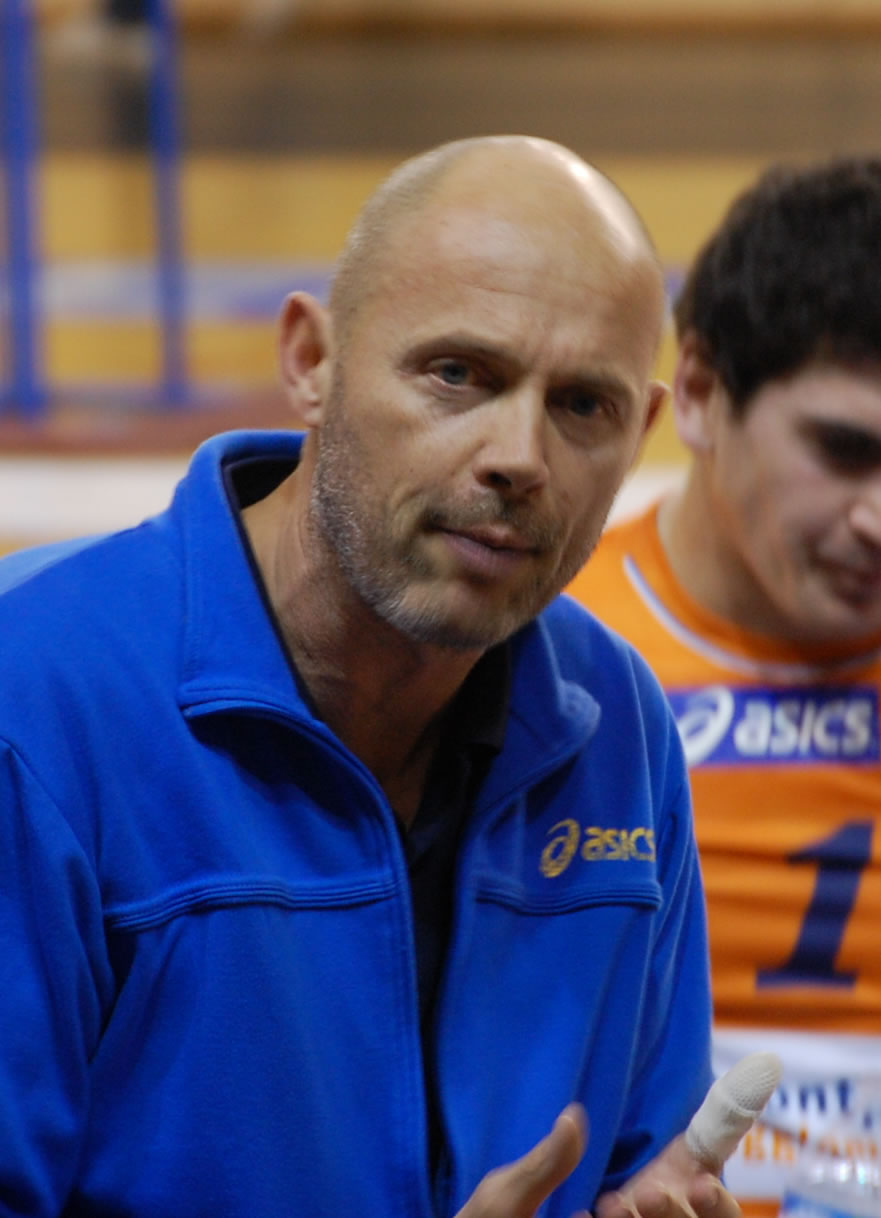

Personal information
- Nationality: French
- Born: 25 September 1963 (age 63)
- Height: 198 cm (6 ft 6 in)
- Weight: 94 kg (207 lb)

Volleyball information
- Number: 8 (national team)

National team
1990-1992	France

Arnaud Josserand (born 25 September 1963) is a former French male volleyball player. He was part of the France men's national volleyball team at the 1990 FIVB Volleyball Men's World Championship in Brazil and 1992 Summer Olympics.
