= Yaroslav Antonov =

Russian volleyball player

Yaroslav Viktorovich Antonov
Personal information
- Full name: Yaroslav Viktorovich Antonov
- Born: 10 January 1963 (age 63) Obninsk, Russia
- Height: 198 cm (6 ft 6 in)

Volleyball information
- Position: Opposite
- Number: 11

National team
- Years: Team
- 1984–1991 1992: Soviet Union; CIS
Honours
Men's volleyball
Representing Soviet Union
Olympic Games
Silver medal – second place	1988 Seoul	Team
World Championship
Silver medal – second place	1986 France	Team
Bronze medal – third place	1990 Brazil	Team
Goodwill Games
Gold medal – first place	1986 Moscow
Silver medal – second place	1990 Seattle
Friendship Games
Gold medal – first place	1984 Havana
European Championship
Gold medal – first place	1985 Netherlands
Gold medal – first place	1987 Belgium

Yaroslav Viktorovich Antonov (Russian: Ярослав Викторович Антонов; born 10 January 1963) is a Russian former volleyball player who won a silver medal while playing for the Soviet Union in the 1988 Summer Olympics in Seoul. He was a powerful left-handed spiker who led the Soviet team in the late 1980s.

== Personal life ==
Antonov is the father of Oleg Antonov, who played for the Italian men's national volleyball team in the 2016 Olympics and won a silver medal.
