= Lázaro Beltrán =

Cuban volleyball player (1964–2025)

Personal information
- Full name: Lázaro Beltrán Rizo
- Born: 27 February 1964
- Died: 9 November 2025 (aged 61)
- Hometown: Havana, Cuba
- Height: 1.9 m (6 ft 3 in)

Volleyball information
- Position: Outside hitter
- Number: 6

National team
| 1983–1993 | Cuba |
Honours
Men's volleyball
Representing Cuba
World Championship
| Silver medal – second place | 1990 Brazil | Team |
Pan American Games
| Gold medal – first place | 1991 Havana | Team |
| Silver medal – second place | 1983 Caracas | Team |
| Silver medal – second place | 1987 Indianapolis | Team |
Central American and Caribbean Games
| Gold medal – first place | 1986 Santiago de los Caballeros | Team |
| Gold medal – first place | 1993 Ponce | Team |

Lázaro Beltrán (27 February 1964 – 9 November 2025) was a Cuban volleyball player. He competed in the men's tournament at the 1992 Summer Olympics in Barcelona. He also helped Cuba to silver medals at the 1983 and 1987 Pan American Games, and the gold medal at the 1991 Pan American Games. Additionally, he helped Cuba win the silver medal at the 1990 FIVB World Championship in Brazil. Beltrán died on 9 November 2025, at the age of 61.
