= Félix Millán (volleyball) =

Cuban volleyball player

Personal information
- Full name: Félix Millán Casanova
- Nationality: Cuban
- Born: 13 October 1967 (age 59)
- Height: 1.98 m (6 ft 6 in)

Volleyball information
- Number: 7

National team
1989–1994	Cuba
Honours
Men's volleyball
Representing Cuba
World Championship
Silver medal – second place	1990 Brazil	Team
FIVB World Cup
Gold medal – first place	1989 Japan
Silver medal – second place	1991 Japan
Goodwill Games
Bronze medal – third place	1990 Seattle
Pan American Games
Gold medal – first place	1991 Havana	Team

Félix Millán (born 13 October 1967) is a Cuban former volleyball player. He competed in the men's tournament at the 1992 Summer Olympics in Barcelona. He won a silver medal at the 1990 FIVB World Championship in Brazil and a gold medal at the 1991 Pan American Games in Havana.
