= France men's national volleyball team =

Men's national volleyball team representing France

France
- Nickname(s): Roosters; Team Yavbou; Les Survivants
- Association: Fédération française de volley-ball (FFVB)
- Confederation: CEV
- Head coach: Andrea Giani
- FIVB ranking: 8 (3 August 2026)

Uniforms
Home	Away	Third

Summer Olympics
- Appearances: 6 (First in 1988)
- Best result: (2020, 2024)

World Championship
- Appearances: 16 (First in 1949)
- Best result: (2002)

World Cup
- Appearances: 2 (First in 1965)
- Best result: 5th (2003)

European Championship
- Appearances: 28 (First in 1948)
- Best result: (2015)
- ffvb.org (in French)
Honours
Olympic Games
Gold medal – first place	2020 Tokyo	Team
Gold medal – first place	2024 Paris	Team
World Championship
Bronze medal – third place	2002 Argentina	Team
World League
Gold medal – first place	2015 Rio de Janeiro
Gold medal – first place	2017 Curitiba
Silver medal – second place	2006 Moscow
Bronze medal – third place	2016 Kraków
Nations League
Gold medal – first place	2022 Bologna	Team
Gold medal – first place	2024 Łódź	Team
Silver medal – second place	2018 Lille	Team
Bronze medal – third place	2021 Rimini	Team
European Championship
Gold medal – first place	2015 Bulgaria/Italy
Silver medal – second place	1948 Italy
Silver medal – second place	1987 Belgium
Silver medal – second place	2003 Germany
Silver medal – second place	2009 Turkey
Silver medal – second place	2026 Bulgaria/Finland/Italy/Romania
Bronze medal – third place	1951 France
Bronze medal – third place	1985 Netherlands

The France national men's volleyball team represents the country in international competitions and friendly matches. It was the reigning European Champion in 2015 and is ranked 3rd (as of 1 January 2023) in the FIVB world ranking. France have been competing in the World League ever since the inaugural edition in 1990 and continuously since 1999. In 2006 they finished second to Brazil but had their share of disappointment in subsequent seasons. In 2009 they narrowly missed making the Final Six, falling at the last hurdle to Slovenia. They suffered another setback in 2010 when they again missed the finals and finished 12th.

In 2015, France won the European Championship and World League (also in 2017).

France competed at the Olympic Games for the fourth time in Rio 2016, finishing ninth. Five years later, they won gold after defeating Russia in Tokyo 2020. They retained their Olympic title at Paris 2024.

== Competition record ==
=== Olympic Games ===
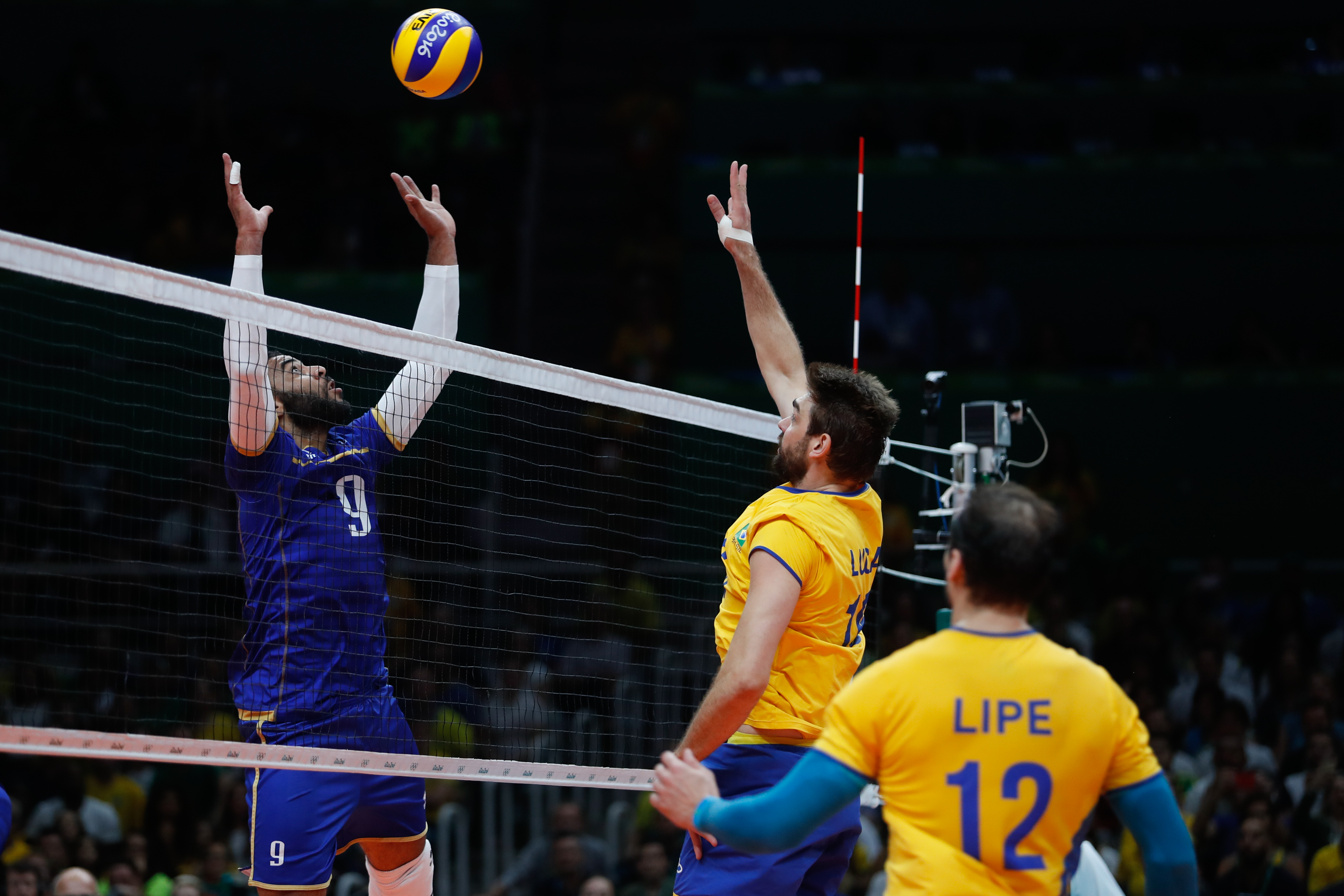
2016 Summer Olympics, Brazil v France

Champions 2nd place 3rd place 4th place

Olympic Games record									Qualification record				
Year	Round	Position	GP	MW	ML	SW	SL	Squad	GP	MW	ML	SW	SL
(Japan) 1964	Did not qualify								3	2	1	7	3
(Mexico) 1968	Did not qualify								1967 European Championship				
(West Germany) 1972	Did not qualify								5	2	3	8	9
(Canada) 1976	Did not qualify								1975 European Championship				
(Soviet Union) 1980	Did not qualify								1979 European Championship				
(United States) 1984	Did not qualify								1983 European Championship				
(South Korea) 1988	5th–8th places	8th	7	3	4	12	13	Squad	1987 European Championship				
(Spain) 1992	11th place match	11th	6	2	4	9	14	Squad	5	5	0	15	4
(United States) 1996	Did not qualify								Did not qualify				
(Australia) 2000	Did not qualify								3	2	1	7	5
(Greece) 2004	Preliminary round	9th	5	2	3	8	10	Squad	11	9	2	27	9
(China) 2008	Did not qualify								3	2	1	6	3
(United Kingdom) 2012	Did not qualify								3	2	1	8	5
(Brazil) 2016	Preliminary round	9th	5	2	3	8	9	Squad	12	9	3	30	14
(Japan) 2020	Final	Gold	8	5	3	19	14	Squad	8	5	3	19	12
(France) 2024	Final	Gold	6	5	1	17	7	Squad	Qualified as host				
(United States) 2028	Future event								Future event				
(Australia) 2032	Future event								Future event				
Total	2 Titles	6/16	37	19	18	73	67	—	53	38	15	127	64

=== World Championship ===
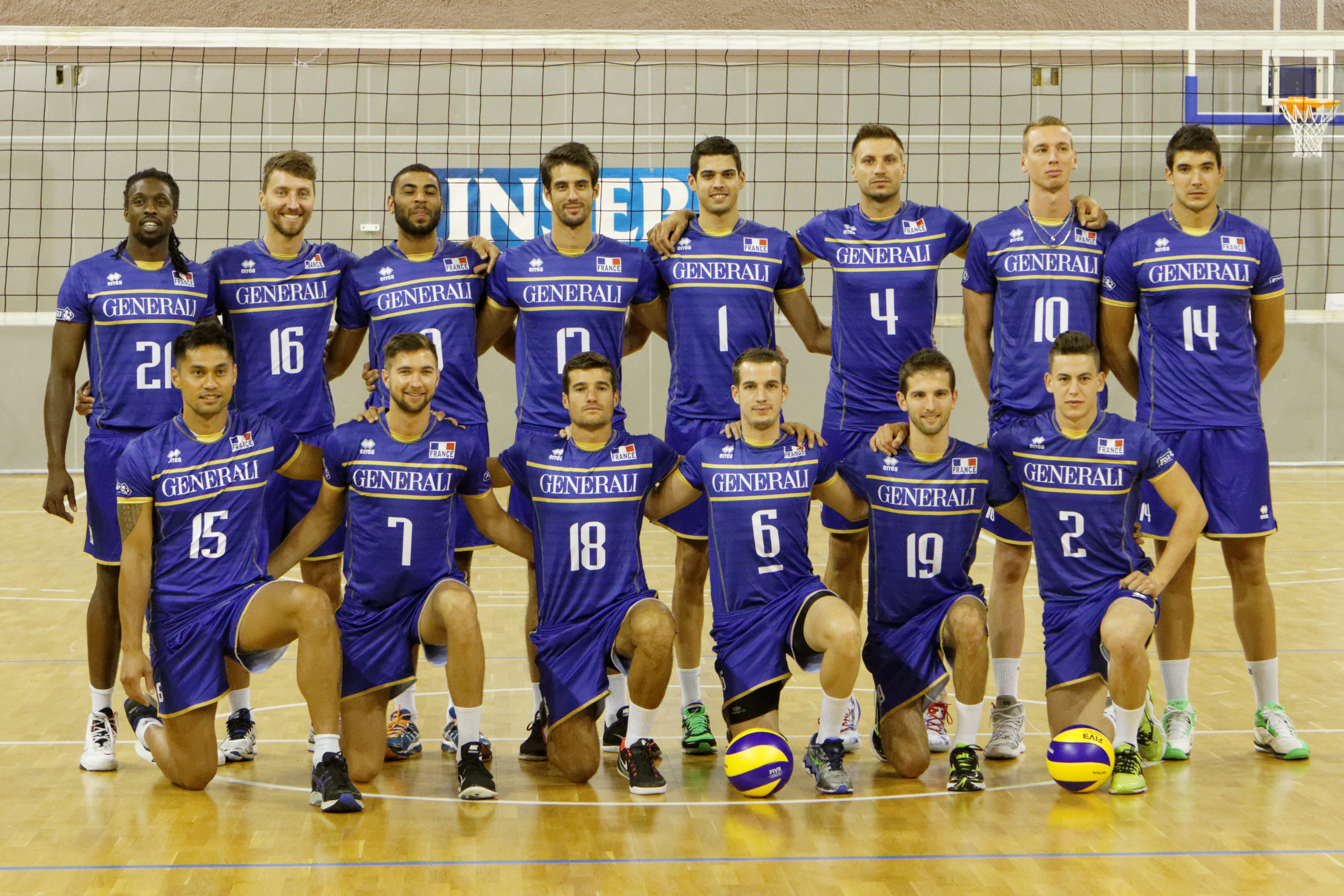
France team in World Championship 2014.

Champions Runners up Third place Fourth place

FIVB World Championship record
Year	Round	Position	GP	MW	ML	SW	SL	Squad
(Czechoslovakia) 1949		6th						Squad
(Soviet Union) 1952		6th						Squad
(France) 1956		7th						Squad
(Brazil) 1960		9th						Squad
(Soviet Union) 1962	did not enter							
(Czechoslovakia) 1966		18th						Squad
(Bulgaria) 1970		17th						Squad
(Mexico) 1974		16th						Squad
(Italy) 1978		15th						Squad
(Argentina) 1982		16th						Squad
(France) 1986		6th						Squad
(Brazil) 1990		8th						Squad
(Greece) 1994	Did not qualify							
(Japan) 1998	Did not qualify							
(Argentina) 2002	Semifinals	3rd						Squad
(Japan) 2006		6th						Squad
(Italy) 2010		11th						Squad
(Poland) 2014	Semifinals	4th						Squad
(Italy) (Bulgaria) 2018	Second round	7th	8	5	3	21	12	Squad
(Poland) (Slovenia) 2022	Quarterfinals	5th	5	4	1	14	7	Squad
(Philippines) 2025	Preliminary round	18th	3	1	2	7	6	Squad
(Poland) 2027	Qualified							
(Qatar) 2029	To be determined							
Total	0 Title(s)	18/23						

=== World Cup ===
Champions Runners up Third place Fourth place

FIVB World Cup record
Year	Result	Pld	W	L	SW	SL	PW	PL
(Poland) 1965	11th	6	0	6	4	18	208	318
(East Germany) 1969	did not qualify							
(Japan) 1977	did not qualify							
(Japan) 1981	did not qualify							
(Japan) 1985	did not qualify							
(Japan) 1989	did not qualify							
(Japan) 1991	did not qualify							
(Japan) 1995	did not qualify							
(Japan) 1999	did not qualify							
(Japan) 2003	5th	11	7	4	24	16	950	868
(Japan) 2007	Did not qualify							
(Japan) 2011	Did not qualify							
(Japan) 2015	Did not qualify							
(Japan) 2019	Did not qualify							
(Japan) 2023	Did not qualify							
Total	3/15	17	7	10	28	34	1158	1186

=== World Grand Champions Cup ===
Champions Runners up Third place Fourth place

World Grand Champions record
Year	Round	Position	GP	MW	ML	SW	SL	Squad
(Japan) 1993	did not qualify							
(Japan) 1997	did not qualify							
(Japan) 2001	did not qualify							
(Japan) 2005	did not qualify							
(Japan) 2009	did not qualify							
(Japan) 2013	did not qualify							
(Japan) 2017	Round Robin	5th	5	1	4	6	12	Squad
Total	0 Titles	1/7	5	1	4	6	12	—

=== World League ===
Champions Runners up Third place Fourth place

FIVB World League record
Year	Round	Position	Pld	W	L	SW	SL	Squad
(Japan) 1990		5th	12	5	7	24	26	Squad
(Italy) 1991		8th	16	3	13	18	42	Squad
(Italy) 1992		11th	12	1	11	9	34	Squad
(Brazil) 1993	did not enter							
(Italy) 1994	did not enter							
(Brazil) 1995	did not enter							
(Netherlands) 1996	did not enter							
(Russia) 1997	did not enter							
(Italy) 1998	did not enter							
(Argentina) 1999		7th	12	5	7	25	26	Squad
(Netherlands) 2000		7th	12	7	5	24	21	Squad
(Poland) 2001		5th	15	9	6	33	29	Squad
(Brazil) 2002		7th	15	9	6	29	27	Squad
(Spain) 2003		10th	12	6	6	26	20	Squad
(Italy) 2004		5th	12	9	3	29	17	Squad
(Serbia and Montenegro) 2005		10th	12	4	8	17	30	Squad
(Russia) 2006	Final	2nd	17	11	6	41	30	Squad
(Poland) 2007		6th	14	7	7	30	29	Squad
(Brazil) 2008		10th	12	6	6	21	25	Squad
(Serbia) 2009		9th	12	6	6	26	24	Squad
(Argentina) 2010		12th	12	5	7	20	29	Squad
(Poland) 2011		12th	12	3	9	18	29	Squad
(Bulgaria) 2012		7th	12	9	3	29	19	Squad
(Argentina) 2013		10th	10	5	5	21	23	Squad
(Italy) 2014	G2 Final	10th	14	11	3	38	14	Squad
(Brazil) 2015	G1 Final	1st	18	17	1	52	11	Squad
(Poland) 2016	G1 Semifinals	3rd	13	8	5	32	18	Squad
(Brazil) 2017	G1 Final	1st	13	12	1	38	14	Squad
Total	2 Titles	22/28	289	158	131	600	537	

=== Nations League ===
1st place 2nd place 3rd place 4th place

FIVB Nations League record
Year	Round	Position	GP	MW	ML	SW	SL	Squad
(France) 2018	Final	2nd	19	15	4	47	23	Squad
(United States) 2019	Final six	6th	17	11	6	39	24	Squad
(Italy) 2021	Semifinals	3rd	17	12	5	44	25	Squad
(Italy) 2022	Final	1st	15	12	3	40	13	Squad
(Poland) 2023	Quarterfinals	8th	13	6	7	25	24	Squad
(Poland) 2024	Final	1st	15	11	4	39	25	Squad
(China) 2025	Quarterfinals	5th	13	8	5	31	21	Squad
(China) 2026	Preliminary round	11th	12	6	6	23	24	Squad
(N/A) 2027	Qualified							
Total	2 Titles	9/9	121	81	40	288	179	—

=== European Championship ===
Champions Runners up Third place Fourth place

European Championship record
Year	Round	Position	Pld	W	L	SW	SL	Squad
(Italy) 1948		Runners-up						Squad
(Bulgaria) 1950	did not enter							
(France) 1951		Third place						Squad
(Romania) 1955		8th						Squad
(Czechoslovakia) 1958		8th						Squad
(Romania) 1963		8th						Squad
(Turkey) 1967		10th						Squad
(Italy) 1971		14th						Squad
(Socialist Federal Republic of Yugoslavia) 1975		8th						Squad
(Finland) 1977		10th						Squad
(France) 1979		4th						Squad
(Bulgaria) 1981		8th						Squad
(East Germany) 1983		12th						Squad
(Netherlands) 1985		Third place						Squad
(Belgium) 1987	Final	Runners-up						Squad
(Sweden) 1989		5th						Squad
(Germany) 1991		9th						Squad
(Finland) 1993		9th						Squad
(Greece) 1995	Did not qualify							
(Netherlands) 1997	Semifinals	4th						Squad
(Austria) 1999		6th	5	2	3	11	9	Squad
(Czech Republic) 2001		7th						Squad
(Germany) 2003	Final	Runners-up						Squad
(Italy) / (Serbia and Montenegro) 2005		7th						Squad
(Russia) 2007		9th						Squad
(Turkey) 2009	Final	Runners-up						Squad
(Austria) (Czech Republic) 2011	Quarterfinals	7th	5	3	2	11	10	Squad
(Denmark) (Poland) 2013	Quarterfinals	5th	4	3	1	10	5	Squad
(Bulgaria) (Italy) 2015	Final	Champions	6	6	0	18	6	Squad
(Poland) 2017	Playoffs	9th	4	2	2	9	8	Squad
(Belgium) (France) (Netherlands) (Slovenia) 2019	Semifinals	4th	9	7	2	23	7	Squad
(Poland) (Czech Republic) (Estonia) (Finland) 2021	Round of 16	9th	6	5	1	15	4	Squad
(Italy) (Bulgaria) (North Macedonia) (Israel) 2023	Semifinals	4th	9	6	3	21	10	Squad
(Bulgaria) (Finland) (Italy) (Romania) 2026	Final	Runners-up	9	7	2	24	8	Squad
(Montenegro) 2028								
Total	1 Title	31/33						

== Results and fixtures ==
=== 2026 ===
10 June Nations League PR	France	v	Italy	Ottawa, Canada
16:00 (UTC−4)				Stadium: TD Place Arena

11 June Nations League PR	Canada	v	France	Ottawa, Canada
19:30 (UTC−4)				Stadium: TD Place Arena

12 June Nations League PR	Turkey	v	France	Ottawa, Canada
19:30 (UTC−4)				Stadium: TD Place Arena

14 June Nations League PR	Germany	v	France	Ottawa, Canada
11:00 (UTC−4)				Stadium: TD Place Arena

24 June Nations League PR	France	v	Iran	Orléans, France
20:30 (UTC+2)				Stadium: CO'Met Arena

25 June Nations League PR	France	v	Cuba	Orléans, France
20:30 (UTC+2)				Stadium: CO'Met Arena

27 June Nations League PR	France	v	Serbia	Orléans, France
20:30 (UTC+2)				Stadium: CO'Met Arena

28 June Nations League PR	France	v	Japan	Orléans, France
20:30 (UTC+2)				Stadium: CO'Met Arena

15 July Nations League PR	France	v	Brazil	Chicago, United States
16:00 (UTC–5)				Stadium: Now Arena

16 July Nations League PR	China	v	France	Chicago, United States
16:00 (UTC–5)				Stadium: Now Arena

18 July Nations League PR	France	v	Poland	Chicago, United States
16:00 (UTC–5)				Stadium: Now Arena

19 July Nations League PR	Bulgaria	v	France	Chicago, United States
16:00 (UTC–5)				Stadium: Now Arena

== Team ==
=== Current squad ===
Roster for the 2024 Summer Olympics.

The roster was announced on 8 July 2024.

Head coach: (Italy) Andrea Giani

- 1 Barthélémy Chinenyeze MB
- 2 Jenia Grebennikov L
- 4 Jean Patry OP
- 6 Benjamin Toniutti (c) S
- 7 Kévin Tillie OH
- 9 Earvin N'Gapeth OH
- 11 Antoine Brizard S
- 14 Nicolas Le Goff MB
- 17 Trévor Clévenot OH
- 19 Yacine Louati OH
- 21 Théo Faure OP
- 25 Quentin Jouffroy MB

=== Coach history ===
- 1938–1946 : (France) Plaswick
- 1946–1947 : (France) René Verdier
- 1947–1965 : (France) Marcel Mathor
- 1965-1965 : (Japan) Shigeyoshi Nagasaki
- 1965–1968 : (Romania) Nicolae Sotir
- 1968–1970 : (France) Georges Derose
- 1970–1979 : (France) Roger Schmitt
- 1979–1983 : (France) Jean-Marc Buchel
- 1983-1983 : (Bulgaria) Georges Komatov
- 1983–1984 : (France) Éric Daniel
- 1984–1985 : (France) Jean-Marc Buchel
- 1985–1988 : (France) Éric Daniel
- 1988–1992 : (France) Gérard Castan
- 1993–1994 : (France) Jean-Marie Fabiani
- 1994–1995 : (France) Jean-Michel Roche
- 1995-1995 : (France) Gérard Castan
- 1995–1999 : (Russia) Vladimir Kondra
- 1999–2000 : (France) Pierre Laborie
- 2001–2012 : (France) Philippe Blain
- 2012–2021 : (France) Laurent Tillie
- 2021 : (Brazil) Bernardo Rezende
- 2022–present : (Italy) Andrea Giani

=== Record attendance ===
#	Player	Years	Appearances
1	Hervé Mazzon	1980–1991	417
2	Christophe Meneau	1986–2000	407
3	Laurent Tillie	1982–1995	406
4	Alain Fabiani	1977–1992	392
5	Stéphane Faure	1977–1988	350
6	Philippe Blain	1980–1991	340
7	Laurent Chambertin	1987–2002	336
8	Éric Bouvier	1979–1992	325
9	Luc Marquet	1990–2003	325
10	Stéphane Antiga	1998–2010	306
11	Laurent Capet	1993–2004	300
12	Olivier Rossard	1986–1995	294
13	Jean-Marc Jurkovitz	1983–1993	290
14	Frantz Granvorka	1996–2007	288
15	Dominique Daquin	1994–2006	267

- Last updated table : December 2021.

== Kit providers ==
The table below shows the history of kit providers for the France national volleyball team.

Period	Kit provider
2000–	Asics; Erreà

=== Sponsorship ===
Primary sponsors include: main sponsors like Herbalife Nutrition, Generali other sponsors: Gerflor, L'Équipe, Française des Jeux lottery, Molten, Zamst, Moneaucristaline, Veinoplus, Appartcity, Herbalife International France and Pointp-tp.

== Head-to-head record ==
This page shows France men's national volleyball team's Head-to-head record at the Volleyball at the Summer Olympics, FIVB Volleyball Men's World Cup, FIVB Volleyball World Grand Champions Cup.

Opponent	GP	MW	ML	SW	SL
Algeria	1	1	0	3	0
Argentina	4	2	2	8	6
Brazil	4	0	4	4	12
Bulgaria	2	0	2	0	6
Canada	4	3	1	9	3
China	1	1	0	3	1
Egypt	1	1	0	3	0
Germany	1	1	0	3	2
Greece	1	0	1	2	3
Hungary	1	0	1	1	3
Iran	1	0	1	2	3
Italy	5	1	4	5	12
Japan	4	4	0	12	3
Mexico	1	1	0	3	0
Netherlands	2	0	2	2	6
Poland	4	3	1	9	5
Russia	2	2	0	6	3
Serbia	1	1	0	3	2
Serbia and Montenegro	2	1	1	3	4
Slovenia	1	0	1	2	3
South Korea	1	0	1	1	3
Soviet Union	1	0	1	1	3
Spain	1	0	1	2	3
Sweden	1	0	1	2	3
Tunisia	4	4	0	12	3
United States	6	0	6	2	18
Venezuela	1	1	0	3	0
Yugoslavia	1	0	1	1	3
Total	59	27	32	107	113
