= Idalberto Valdés =

Cuban volleyball player

Idalberto Valdes

Personal information
- Full name: Idalberto Valdés Pedro
- Born: 14 April 1967 (age 59); Mariel, Cuba
- Height: 1.96 m (6 ft 5 in)

Volleyball information
- Position: Middle blocker
- Number: 5

National team
1986–1995	Cuba
Honours
Men's volleyball
Representing Cuba
World Championship
Silver medal – second place	1990 Brazil	Team
FIVB World Cup
Gold medal – first place	1989 Japan
Silver medal – second place	1991 Japan
Goodwill Games
Bronze medal – third place	1990 Seattle
Pan American Games
Gold medal – first place	1991 Havana	Team
Silver medal – second place	1987 Indianapolis	Team
Bronze medal – third place	1995 Mar del Plata	Team
Central American and Caribbean Games
Gold medal – first place	1986 Santiago de los Caballeros	Team

Idalberto Valdés (born 14 April 1967) is a Cuban former volleyball player. Valdés competed in the men's tournament at the 1992 Summer Olympics in Barcelona. Valdés helped Cuba win the silver medal at the 1987 Pan American Games in Indianapolis, the gold medal at the 1991 Pan American Games in Havana, and the bronze medal at the 1995 Pan American Games in Mar del Plata. He also helped Cuba win the silver medal at the 1990 FIVB World Championship in Brazil.
