= Lázaro Marín =

Cuban volleyball player

Personal information
- Full name: Lázaro de la C. Marín Ortega
- Born: 30 March 1967 (age 59); Havana, Cuba
- Height: 1.98 m (6 ft 6 in)

Volleyball information
- Number: 12

National team
1987–1996	Cuba
Honours
Men's volleyball
Representing Cuba
World Championship
Silver medal – second place	1990 Brazil	Team
FIVB World Cup
Gold medal – first place	1989 Japan
Silver medal – second place	1991 Japan
Pan American Games
Silver medal – second place	1987 Indianapolis	Team
Bronze medal – third place	1995 Mar del Plata	Team
Central American and Caribbean Games
Gold medal – first place	1993 Ponce	Team

Lázaro Marín (born 30 March 1967) is a Cuban former volleyball player. He competed at the 1992 and the 1996 Summer Olympics. Marín helped the Cuban national team to the silver medal at the 1987 Pan American Games and the bronze medal at the 1995 Pan American Games. He also helped Cuba win the silver medal at the 1990 FIVB World Championship.
