= Freddy Brooks =

Cuban volleyball player (born 1969)

Personal information
- Full name: Freddy Brooks Bongó
- Nationality: Cuban/Greek
- Born: 10 August 1969 (age 57); Guantánamo, Cuba
- Height: 1.87 m (6 ft 2 in)

Volleyball information
- Position: Outside hitter
- Number: 1

National team
| 1989–1998 | Cuba |
Honours
Men's volleyball
Representing Cuba
World Championship
| Silver medal – second place | 1990 Brazil | Team |
FIVB World Cup
| Gold medal – first place | 1989 Japan |
| Silver medal – second place | 1991 Japan |
World League
| Gold medal – first place | 1998 Milan |
| Silver medal – second place | 1997 Moscow |
Pan American Games
| Gold medal – first place | 1991 Havana | Team |
| Bronze medal – third place | 1995 Mar del Plata | Team |

Freddy Brooks (born 10 August 1969) is a Cuban former volleyball player. He competed with the Cuban men's national volleyball team at the 1992 and 1996 Summer Olympics. Brooks won a silver medal at the 1990 FIVB World Championship and a gold medal at the 1991 Pan American Games with the Cuban team.

== Coaching ==
In 2011, along with his wife Dina Lambrakis, Brooks founded the Kronos Volleyball Academy. In 2017, he became an assistant coach for PAOK Volley in Greece.
