= Abel Sarmientos =

Cuban volleyball player (1962–2024)

Personal information
- Full name: Abel Sarmientos Bios
- Born: 22 July 1962; Camagüey, Cuba
- Died: 12 July 2024 (aged 61); Havana, Cuba
- Height: 1.97 m (6 ft 6 in)

Volleyball information
- Position: Outside hitter
- Number: 10

National team
1981–1995	Cuba
Honours
Men's volleyball
Representing Cuba
World Championship
Silver medal – second place	1990 Brazil	Team
FIVB World Cup
Gold medal – first place	1989 Japan
Silver medal – second place	1981 Japan
Silver medal – second place	1991 Japan
Goodwill Games
Bronze medal – third place	1990 Seattle
Friendship Games
Silver medal – second place	1984 Havana
Pan American Games
Silver medal – second place	1983 Caracas	Team
Silver medal – second place	1987 Indianapolis	Team
Bronze medal – third place	1995 Mar del Plata	Team
Central American and Caribbean Games
Gold medal – first place	1982 Havana	Team
Gold medal – first place	1993 Ponce	Team

Abel Sarmientos (22 July 1962 – 12 July 2024) was a Cuban volleyball player. He was part of the Cuban men's national volleyball team at the 1992 Summer Olympics in Barcelona. He helped the Cuban team win the gold medal at the 1989 FIVB World Cup in Japan and the silver medal at the 1990 FIVB World Championship in Brazil.

== Personal life and death ==
Sarmientos was born on 22 July 1962. His older brother, Victoriano, also played on the Cuban national team.

Sarmientos died in Havana on 12 July 2024, at the age of 61.
