= Yuri Cherednik =

Russian volleyball player (born 1966)

Personal information
- Nickname: Юрий Чередник
- Nationality: Russian
- Born: 25 June 1966 (age 60) Chişinău, Moldavian SSR, Soviet Union
- Height: 203 cm (6 ft 8 in)

Volleyball information
- Position: Outside hitter
- Number: 12 (national team)

Career
- Years: Team
- 1994: Lube Treia Italy

National team
- Years: Team
- 1988–1991 1992 1994: Soviet Union; CIS; Russia
Honours
Men's volleyball
Representing Soviet Union
Olympic Games
Silver medal – second place	1988 Seoul	Team
World Championship
Bronze medal – third place	1990 Brazil	Team
World Cup
Gold medal – first place	1991 Japan
World League
Bronze medal – third place	1991 Italy
Goodwill Games
Silver medal – second place	1990 Seattle
European Championship
Gold medal – first place	1991 Germany

Yuri Cherednik (Russian: Юрий Чередник, born 25 June 1966) is a Russian former volleyball player who competed for the Soviet Union in the 1988 Summer Olympics and for the Unified Team in the 1992 Summer Olympics. He is 203 cm tall. Later he was part of the Russia men's national volleyball team. He played for Lube Treia Italy.

== Biography ==
Cherednik was born at Chişinău and debuted in 1983 for Motorist Leningrad. In 1988, he was part of the Soviet team that won the silver medal in the Olympic tournament. He played four matches.

Four years later, Cherednik finished seventh with the Unified Team in the 1992 Olympic tournament. With the Soviet (or Unified Team) national team he won also a World Cup in 1991, the European Championships of 1991 and a bronze medal in the 1990 Championship.

Cherednik played in Italy from 1992 with Centromatic Prato (winning the title of MVP of Italy's A1 League that year). He subsequently played for Macerata, Bologna, Ferrara and others, before returning to Russia in 2006, where he concluded his playing career in 2007 with the Spartak St. Petersburg.
