= O Uk-hwan =

South Korean volleyball player (born 1970)

Personal information
- Nationality: South Korean
- Born: 8 September 1970 (age 54)

Sport
- Sport: Volleyball

O Uk-hwan (born 8 September 1970) is a South Korean volleyball player. He competed in the men's tournament at the 1992 Summer Olympics.
