= Andrei Kuznetsov (volleyball) =

Soviet volleyball player (1966–1994)

Personal information
- Full name: Andrei Kuznetsov
- Nickname: Андрей Кузнецов
- Nationality: Russian
- Born: 23 April 1966; Poltava, Ukraine
- Died: 30 December 1994 (aged 28)
- Height: 1.98 m (6 ft 6 in)
- Weight: 95 kg (209 lb)

Volleyball information
- Position: Opposite
- Number: 2

Career
Years	Teams
1994	Les Copains Ferrara Italy

National team
1987-1991; 1992; 1993-1994	Soviet Union; CIS; Russia
Honours
Men's volleyball
Representing Soviet Union
Olympic Games
Silver medal – second place	1988 Seoul	Team
World Championship
Bronze medal – third place	1990 Brazil	Team
Goodwill Games
Silver medal – second place	1990 Seattle
European Championship
Gold medal – first place	1987 Belgium
Gold medal – first place	1991 Germany
Men's volleyball
Representing Russia
European Championship
Bronze medal – third place	1993 Finland

Andrei Kuznetsov (Russian: Андрей Кузнецов, 24 April 1966 – 30 December 1994) was a Russian volleyball player who competed for the Soviet Union in the 1988 Summer Olympics and for the Unified Team in the 1992 Summer Olympics. He was born in Poltava, Ukraine and was 196 cm tall. In 1988 he was part of the Soviet team which won the silver medal in the Olympic tournament. He played all seven matches. Four years later he finished seventh with the Unified Team in the 1992 Olympic tournament. He played all eight matches.

On 30 December 1994, he died in a road accident in Chieti, Italy. Since 1996, Sport Express has presented the best volleyball champion of Russia in his name.
