= Laurent Chambertin =

French volleyball player (born 1966)

Laurent Chambertin (born September 29, 1966 in Dijon, Côte-d'Or) is a retired volleyball player from France, who earned a total number of 336 caps for the Men's National Team. He also competed in the men's tournament at the 1992 Summer Olympics.

== International Competitions ==
- 1989 – European Championship (5th place)
- 1990 – World League (5th place)
- 1990 – World Championship (8th place)
- 1991 – World League (8th place)
- 1991 – European Championship (9th place)
- 1992 – World League (11th place)
- 1992 – Summer Olympics (9th place)
- 1993 – European Championship (9th place)
- 1997 – European Championship (4th place)
- 1999 – World League (7th place)
- 1999 – European Championship (6th place)
- 2000 – World League (7th place)
- 2001 – World League (6th place)
- 2001 – European Championship (7th place)
