= Philippe-Marie Salvan =

French volleyball player (born 1965)

Personal information
- Nationality: French
- Born: 17 May 1965 (age 61)
- Height: 195 cm (6 ft 5 in)
- Weight: 90 kg (198 lb)

Volleyball information
- Number: 15 (national team)

National team
1990	France

Philippe-Marie Salvan (born 17 May 1965) is a former French male volleyball player. He was part of the France men's national volleyball team at the 1988 Summer Olympics and 1992 Summer Olympics. He also played at the 1990 FIVB Volleyball Men's World Championship in Brazil.
