= Evgeni Krasilnikov =

Russian volleyball player

Personal information
- Nickname: Евгений Красильников
- Born: April 7, 1965; Kurgan, Russian SFSR, USSR
- Died: 6 March 2014 (aged 48)
- Height: 191 cm (6 ft 3 in)

Volleyball information
- Position: Setter
- Number: 6 (national team)

Career
| Years | Teams |
|---|---|
| 1990; 1994 | Dynamo Moscow (Turkey) Halkbank Ankara |

National team
| 1986–1991; 1992; 1994 | Soviet Union; CIS; Russia |
Honours
Men's volleyball
Representing Soviet Union
Olympic Games
| Silver medal – second place | 1988 Seoul | Team |
World Championship
| Bronze medal – third place | 1990 Brazil | Team |
FIVB World Cup
| Gold medal – first place | 1991 Japan |
Goodwill Games
| Gold medal – first place | 1986 Moscow |
| Silver medal – second place | 1990 Seattle |
European Championship
| Gold medal – first place | 1991 Germany |
Men's volleyball
Representing Russia
European Championship
| Bronze medal – third place | 1993 Finland |

Evgeni Krasilnikov (Russian: Евгений Витальевич Красильников; 7 April 1965 – 6 March 2014) was a Russian former volleyball player who competed for the Soviet Union in the 1988 Summer Olympics in Seoul and for the Unified Team in the 1992 Summer Olympics in Barcelona.

In 1988, Krasilnikov was part of the Soviet team that won the silver medal in the Olympic tournament. He played one match. Four years later, Krasilnikov finished seventh with the Unified Team in the 1992 Olympic tournament. He played all eight matches.

== Clubs ==
- Dynamo Moscow (1990)
- (Turkey) Halkbank Ankara (1994)
