= Kim Wan-sik =

South Korean volleyball player (born 1971)

Personal information
- Nationality: South Korean
- Born: 29 July 1971 (age 53)

Sport
- Sport: Volleyball

Kim Wan-sik (born 29 July 1971) is a South Korean volleyball player. He competed in the men's tournament at the 1992 Summer Olympics.
