= Igor Runov =

Soviet volleyball player

Personal information
- Nationality: Russian
- Born: 8 February 1963; Moscow, Russia
- Died: 11 April 2011 (aged 48); Moscow
- Height: 203 cm (6 ft 8 in)

Volleyball information
- Position: Middle blocker
- Number: 4 (1988); 5 (1992)

National team
1986–1991; 1992	Soviet Union; CIS
Honours
Men's volleyball
Representing Soviet Union
Olympic Games
Silver medal – second place	1988 Seoul	Team
World Championship
Silver medal – second place	1986 France	Team
Bronze medal – third place	1990 Brazil	Team
Goodwill Games
Gold medal – first place	1986 Moscow
European Championship
Gold medal – first place	1987 Belgium
Gold medal – first place	1991 Germany

Igor Runov (Russian: Игорь Рунов; 8 February 1963 – 11 April 2011} was a Russian volleyball player who competed for the Soviet Union in the 1988 Summer Olympics in Seoul and for the Unified Team in the 1992 Summer Olympics in Barcelona. In 1988, he was part of the Soviet team which won the silver medal in the Olympic tournament. He played four matches. Four years later, he finished seventh with the Unified Team in the 1992 Olympic tournament. He played six matches.
