= Elite Football Women =

Swedish women's football organisation

- Elitfotboll Dam
- Abbreviation: EFD
- Formation: 28 October 1978
- Type: Sports organisation
- Headquarters: Solna, Stockholm
- Region served: Sweden
- Members: 28 football clubs
- Secretary General: Helena Nilsson, interim
- President: Anders Billström

Elite Football Women (EFD, Swedish: Elitfotboll Dam), is a Swedish interest organisation that represents the 28 elite football clubs in the top two divisions (OBOS Damallsvenskan and Elitettan) of the Swedish women's football league system. It was founded in Stockholm on 28 October 1978.

== Organisation ==
EFD does not administer the divisions, but instead acts in cooperation with the Swedish Football Association, the member clubs, sponsors and partners. The goal is to develop Swedish women's elite football resultwise, economically, commercially and administratively.

EFD holds all commercial and medial rights for licensing. Since 2015 EFD have arranged recordings and broadcasts of all Damallsvenskan matches, which can be viewed worldwide at Damallsvenskan.tv for a fee.

== Secretaries-General ==
Years	Person
1999–2001	Ann-Louise Ebberstein
2001–2006	Ulf Bergquist
2006–2011	Sara Jöngren
2011–July 2019	Linda Wijkström
July 2019–	Tomas Hoszek
