= Park Sam-ryong =

South Korean volleyball player (born 1968)

Personal information
- Nationality: South Korean
- Born: 7 June 1968 (age 57)

Sport
- Sport: Volleyball

Park Sam-ryong (born June 7, 1968) is a South Korean volleyball player. He competed in the men's tournament at the 1988 Summer Olympics.
