= Kevin Boyles =

Canadian volleyball player

Kevin Currie Boyles (born September 17, 1967, in Edmonton, Alberta) is a former volleyball player for Canada. He used to be the head coach of the University of Calgary Dinos women's volleyball team.

A native of Calgary Boyles was captain of the Dinos team as a 5-year player from 1985 through 1989 and in 1993–4, including in 1989 when they went undefeated en route to the CWUAA and CIAU championship. He graduated with bachelor's and master's degrees in kinesiology.

An 8-year member of the national team program, Boyles was member of the Canadian team that finished tenth at the 1992 Summer Olympics. He played professionally in Germany.

Boyles was head coach of the Dinos women's team from 1999 to 2008. He was named CWAUU Coach of the Year in his first year and again in both 2004 and 2005, when was also named CIS Coach of the Year. His team were CIS champions in 2004, runners-up in 2001 and CWUAA champions in 2001, 2002, and 2005.

In November, 2007, Boyles was named Athletic Director for the University of Calgary. In January 2011, Boyles left the University of Calgary to become the CEO and General Manager of the Calgary Winter Club.

== Sources ==
- www.dinosvolleyball.ca
- www.universitysport.ca
- sports-reference
