= Brad Willock =

Canadian volleyball player

Personal information
- Full name: Bradley Scott Willock
- Born: 15 September 1962 (age 64); Edmonton, Alberta, Canada
- Height: 199 cm (6 ft 6 in)
- Weight: 92 kg (203 lb)

Volleyball information
- Number: 1 (national team)

National team
1990	Canada

Bradley Scott Willock (born September 15, 1962 in Edmonton, Alberta) is a former Olympic and CIAU All-Canadian volleyball player.

Willock was a two-time CIAU All-Canadian playing with the University of British Columbia Thunderbirds, in 1981-2 and 1983-4. He was also named a Canada West All-Star in 1981-2, 1982-3, 1983-4, and 1985-6. Willock earned his bachelor's degree in science.

A resident of Richmond, British Columbia (at the time of the Olympics at any rate), Willock played for Canada at the 1992 Summer Olympics. Canada finished the tournament in tenth place.

Willock has worked for the Royal Bank of Canada for over twelve years and is currently a portfolio manager for RBC Asset Management. Upon retiring from the national team he earned a Bachelor of Commerce degree from the University of Calgary.
