= Kazutomo Yoneyama =

Japanese volleyball player (born 1961)

Personal information
- Born: 12 September 1961 (age 65); Tokyo, Japan
- Height: 1.80 m (5 ft 11 in)

Volleyball information
- Position: Setter
- Number: 6

National team
1985–1990	Japan

Kazutomo Yoneyama (米山 一朋, Yoneyama Kazutomo; born 12 September 1961) is a Japanese volleyball player. He competed in the men's tournament at the 1988 Summer Olympics in Seoul.
