= Ma Nak-gil =

South Korean volleyball player (born 1968)

Personal information
- Nationality: South Korean
- Born: 24 April 1968 (age 57)

Sport
- Sport: Volleyball

Ma Nak-gil (born 24 April 1968) is a South Korean volleyball player. He competed in the men's tournament at the 1992 Summer Olympics.
