= Mats Karlsson (volleyball) =

Swedish volleyball player (born 1963)

Personal information
- Nationality: Swedish
- Born: 20 January 1963 (age 62); Nyköping, Sweden

Sport
- Sport: Volleyball

Mats Karlsson (born 20 January 1963) is a Swedish volleyball player. He competed in the men's tournament at the 1988 Summer Olympics.
