= Éric Bouvier =

French volleyball player (born 1961)

Personal information
- Nationality: French
- Born: 5 January 1961 (age 65)
- Height: 196 cm (6 ft 5 in)
- Weight: 97 kg (214 lb)

Volleyball information
- Number: 5 (national team)

Career
- Years: Team
- 1990: ASU Lyon

National team
- Years: Team
- 1986-1992: France

Éric Bouvier (born 5 January 1961) is a former French male volleyball player. He was part of the France men's national volleyball team at the 1988 Summer Olympics and 1992 Summer Olympics. He also played at the 1986 FIVB Volleyball Men's World Championship in France and 1990 FIVB Volleyball Men's World Championship in Brazil. He played for ASU Lyon.

== Clubs ==
- ASU Lyon (1990)
