= Plamen Khristov =

Bulgarian volleyball player (born 1965)

Personal information
- Nationality: Bulgarian
- Born: 5 April 1965 (age 59); Sofia, Bulgaria

Sport
- Sport: Volleyball

Plamen Khristov (Bulgarian: Пламен Христов, born 5 April 1965) is a Bulgarian volleyball player. He competed at the 1988 Summer Olympics and the 1996 Summer Olympics.
