= Tomas Hoszek =

Swedish volleyball player (born 1960)

Personal information
- Nationality: Swedish
- Born: 10 June 1960 (age 64); Stockholm, Sweden

Sport
- Sport: Volleyball

Tomas Hoszek (born 10 June 1960) is a Swedish volleyball player. He competed in the men's tournament at the 1988 Summer Olympics.

In late July 2019, he was appointed secretary general for Elite Football Women.
