= Wagner Rocha =

Brazilian volleyball player (born 1969)

Personal information
- Born: 17 January 1969 (age 56); São Paulo, Brazil

Sport
- Sport: Volleyball

Wagner Rocha (born 17 January 1969) is a Brazilian volleyball player. He competed in the men's tournament at the 1988 Summer Olympics in Seoul.
