= Chang Yoon-chang =

South Korean volleyball player (1960–2025)

Personal information
- Nationality: South Korean
- Born: 10 September 1960
- Died: 30 May 2025 (aged 64); Seoul, South Korea

Sport
- Sport: Volleyball

Chang Yoon-chang (10 September 1960 – 30 May 2025) was a South Korean volleyball player. He competed at the 1984 and 1988 Summer Olympics.

Chang died from stomach cancer on 30 May 2025, at the age of 64.
