= Ron Zwerver =

Dutch volleyball player

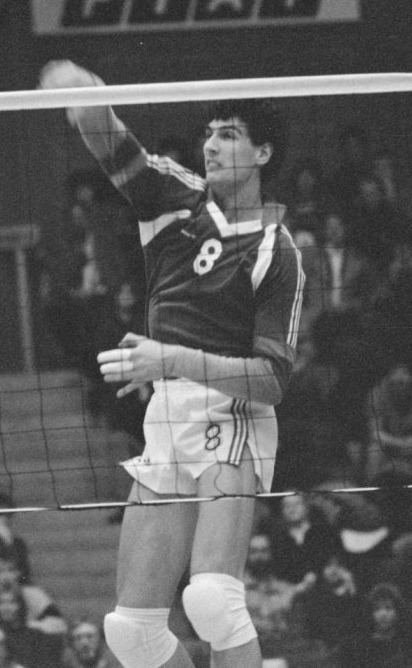
- Ron Zwerver in 1988

Personal information
- Full name: Ronald Ferdinand Zwerver
- Born: 6 June 1967 (age 59); Amsterdam, Netherlands
- Height: 2.00 m (6 ft 7 in)
- Weight: 93 kg (205 lb)

Volleyball information
- Position: Outside hitter
- Number: 8

National team
1987–1996	Netherlands
Honours
Men's volleyball
Representing the Netherlands
Olympic Games
Gold medal – first place	1996 Atlanta	Team
Silver medal – second place	1992 Barcelona	Team
World Championship
Silver medal – second place	1994 Greece	Team
FIVB World Cup
Silver medal – second place	1995 Japan
World League
Gold medal – first place	1996 Rotterdam
Silver medal – second place	1990 Osaka
European Championship
Silver medal – second place	1993 Finland
Silver medal – second place	1995 Greece
Bronze medal – third place	1989 Sweden
Bronze medal – third place	1991 Germany

Ronald ("Ron") Ferdinand Zwerver (born 6 June 1967) is a volleyball coach and former volleyball player from the Netherlands who represented his native country at three consecutive Summer Olympics, starting in 1988 in Seoul. Zwerver was one of the dominant forces in Dutch volleyball in the 1990s. He was selected as the "best attacker" at both the 1990 and 1994 FIVB World Championships.

Zwerver was a member of the Dutch team that won the silver medal at the 1992 Summer Olympics in Barcelona, where he was selected as the "best server", and the gold medal at the 1996 Summer Olympics in Atlanta.

In 2017, Zwerver was inducted into the International Volleyball Hall of Fame.

== Coaching ==
Zwerver coached Nesselande, a team that plays in the highest Dutch volleyball league. He has also served as an assistant coach for the Oregon State University women's volleyball team.

== Individual awards ==
- 1990 FIVB World League "Best Spiker"
- 1990 FIVB Volleyball Men's World Championship "Best Spiker"
- 1991 FIVB World League "Best Server"
- 1991 FIVB World League "Best Spiker"
- 1994 FIVB Volleyball Men's World Championship "Best Spiker"
