= Martin Teffer =

Dutch volleyball player (born 1965)

Personal information
- Born: 7 June 1965 (age 61); Amsterdam, North Holland, Netherlands
- Height: 201 cm (6 ft 7 in)

Volleyball information
- Position: Outside hitter
- Number: 1

National team
1988–1992	Netherlands
Honours
Men's volleyball
Representing the Netherlands
Olympic Games
Silver medal – second place	1992 Barcelona	Team
European Championship
Bronze medal – third place	1989 Sweden
Bronze medal – third place	1991 Germany

Martin Teffer (born 7 June 1965) is a retired volleyball player from the Netherlands who represented his native country at the 1988 and 1992 Summer Olympics, as well as at the 1990 FIVB Volleyball Men's World Championship. His team placed fifth at the 1988 Summer Olympics, and won the silver medal four years later in Barcelona. Teffer later became a volleyball coach.
