= Masafumi Ōura =

Japanese volleyball player and coach

Personal information
- Nickname: Taison
- Born: September 28, 1969; Kamiagatagun (present-day Tsushima), Nagasaki Prefecture
- Died: December 20, 2013 (aged 44); Tokyo
- Height: 1.87 m (6 ft 1 1/2 in)
- Weight: 82 kg (181 lb)
- Spike: 342 cm (135 in)

Coaching information
Previous teams coached
Teams
Japan national youth team (men); Nagasaki Prefectural Shimabara Commercial High School

Volleyball information
- Position: Outside hitter
- Number: 6 (national team)

Career
Years	Teams
1988–1997	Suntory Sunbirds

National team
1990–1995	Japan
Honours
Men's volleyball
Representing Japan
Asian Games
Gold medal – first place	1994 Hiroshima	Team
Bronze medal – third place	1990 Beijing	Team

Masafumi Ōura (大浦正文, Ōura Masafumi; September 28, 1969 – December 20, 2013) was a Japanese volleyball player and coach.

== Personal life and death ==
Born in Kamiagatagun (present-day Tsushima), Nagasaki Prefecture, he graduated from Nagasaki Prefectural Shimabara Commercial High School, where he became a coach after his retirement from active play.

He died on December 20, 2013, in Tokyo from stomach cancer.

== Player ==
- Suntory Sunbirds（1988-1997）
- Summer Olympics - 1992
- World Cup - 1989, 1991, 1995
- World Championship - 1990, 1994

== Awards ==
- 1989 - Best Hitter
- 1990 - Best 6
- 1991 - Best 6
- 1992 - Best 6
- 1993 - Best Hitter and Best 6
