= Andrea Lucchetta =

Italian volleyball player

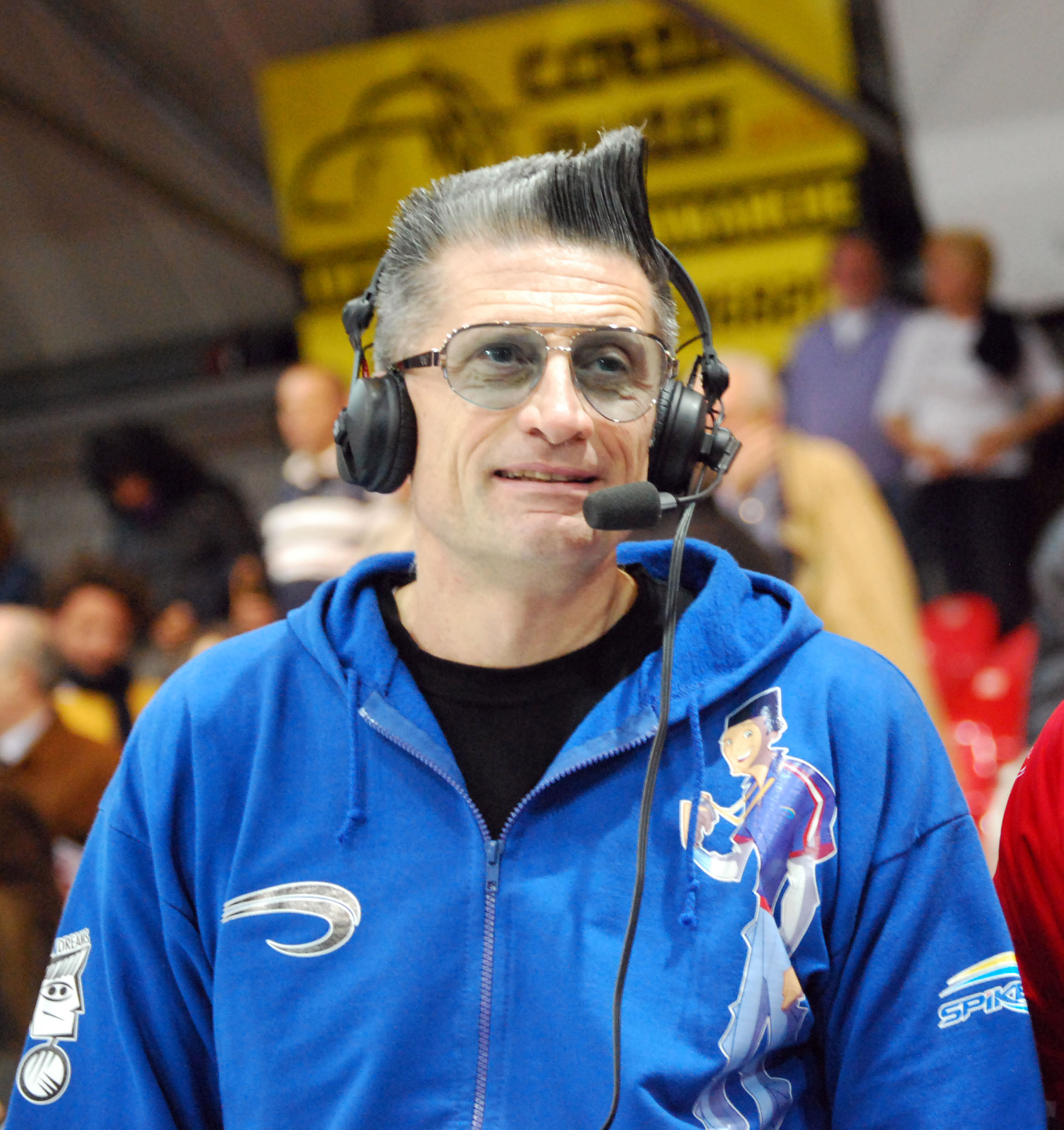
- Lucchetta in 2011

Personal information
- Nickname: Crazy Lucky
- Born: 25 November 1962 (age 63); Treviso, Province of Treviso, Italy
- Height: 199 cm (6 ft 6 in)

Volleyball information
- Position: Middle blocker
- Number: 12

National team
1984–1992	Italy
Honours
Men's volleyball
Representing Italy
Olympic Games
Bronze medal – third place	1984 Los Angeles	Team
World Championship
Gold medal – first place	1990 Brazil	Team
FIVB World Cup
Silver medal – second place	1989 Japan
FIVB World League
Gold medal – first place	1990 Osaka
Gold medal – first place	1991 Milan
Gold medal – first place	1992 Genoa
European Championship
Gold medal – first place	1989 Sweden
Silver medal – second place	1991 Germany

Andrea Lucchetta (born 25 November 1962) is an Italian former volleyball player who is a three-time Olympian. Among his achievements, he won a World Championship with the Italian national volleyball team in 1990. He was born in Treviso, Italy, and is nicknamed "Crazy Lucky" for his bizarre hair style.

Standing at 199 cm (6 ft 6 in), Lucchetta played as middle blocker/hitter. Lucchetta debuted in Italian Major League in 1982 with Panini Modena, where he remained until 1990, winning five Italian titles and one European Champions Cup.

With the Italian team, he made 292 appearances, winning a World Championship in 1989, a European Championship in 1989, and three World Leagues from 1990 to 1992.

Lucchetta won the MVP award in the 1990 World Championship.

Lucchetta is also the creator of the Italian animated series Spike Team.

== Olympics ==
In 1984, Lucchetta was part of the Italian team that won the bronze medal in the Olympic tournament. He played all six matches.

Four years later, Lucchetta finished ninth with the Italian team in the 1988 Olympic tournament. He played one match.

At the 1992 Games, Lucchetta was a member of the Italian team that finished fifth in the Olympic tournament. He played all eight matches.

== Clubs ==
Club	Country	From	To
Sisley Treviso	Italy	1980-1981	1980-1981
Panini Modena	Italy	1981-1982	1989-1990
Milan Volley	Italy	1990-1991	1993-1994
Alpitour Traco Cuneo	Italy	1994-1995	1996-1997
Piaggio Rome	Italy	1997-1998	1997-1998
Casa Modena Unibon	Italy	1998-1999	1999-2000

== Personal life ==
Lucchetta has been married to Nicoletta Tata, by whom he has two sons; he has now a partner called Francesca. He considers himself Roman Catholic.
