= Randy Gingera =

Canadian volleyball player (born 1968)

Randal ("Randy") John Gingera (born April 25, 1968, in Calgary, Alberta) is a former long-time member of the Canada men's national volleyball team and University of Calgary Dinos star volleyball player.

Kid Volleyball as he was known was a three-time Canada West All-Star selection, CIAU All-Canadian in 1988 and '89, and unanimous choice for Canada West and CIAU Player of the Year in 1989, as the Dinos went undefeated, losing their only match of the year to UCLA (at a tournament in Santa Barbara).

A 6'2 right-handed outside hitter, Gingera was a member of the Canadian team that finished tenth at the 1992 Summer Olympics. The team however lost a very close 5-set match to the United States as well as two other 5-set matches and narrowly missed on advancing to the tournament's quarterfinals. He was a member of the national team for eight years and also played professionally for six, two years each in Belgium, Japan, and France. In France he played for Tourcoing in 1996-7 and the following season, Stade Poitevin.

After retiring from competitive volleyball, Gingera returned to U. of C. to complete a B.A. in Fine Arts from the University of Calgary. Graduating in 2000 he then earned an M.A. in Environmental Design, completing the degree in 2005.

== Sources ==
- www.godinos.com
- www.ucalgary.ca
- Canadian Olympic Committee webpage profile
- www.explorare.net
- sports-reference
