= Junichi Kuriuzawa =

Japanese volleyball player (born 1965)

Kuriuzawa Junichi

Personal information
- Born: 25 February 1965 (age 61); Ōfunato, Japan
- Height: 1.90 m (6 ft 3 in)
- Weight: 75 kg (165 lb)

Volleyball information
- Number: 17 (national team)

National team
1990–1992	Japan

Junichi Kuriuzawa (born 25 February 1965, in Ōfunato) is a Japanese former volleyball player who competed in the 1992 Summer Olympics in Barcelona.
