= Chung Euy-tak =

South Korean volleyball player (born 1961)

Personal information
- Nationality: South Korean
- Born: 11 June 1961 (age 64)

Sport
- Sport: Volleyball

Chung Euy-tak (born 11 June 1961) is a South Korean volleyball player. He competed at the 1984 Summer Olympics and the 1988 Summer Olympics.
