= Borislav Kyosev =

Bulgarian volleyball player (born 1961)

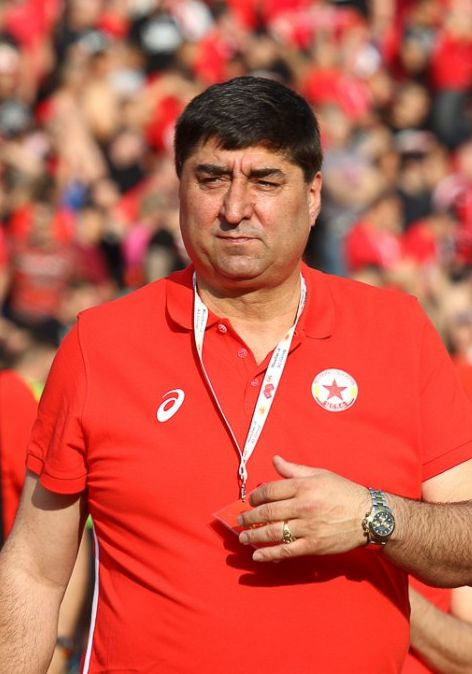
- Borislav Kyosev

Personal information
- Nationality: Bulgarian
- Born: 3 August 1961 (age 63); Balanovo, Bulgaria

Sport
- Sport: Volleyball

Borislav Kyosev (born 3 August 1961) is a Bulgarian volleyball player. He competed in the men's tournament at the 1988 Summer Olympics.
