= Anders Lundmark =

Swedish volleyball player (born 1965)

Personal information
- Nationality: Swedish
- Born: 18 February 1965 (age 60); Örnsköldsvik, Sweden

Sport
- Sport: Volleyball

Anders Lundmark (born 18 February 1965) is a Sweden volleyball player. He competed in the men's tournament at the 1988 Summer Olympics.
