= Allan Coulter =

Canadian volleyball player (born 1959)

Personal information
- Born: 15 December 1959 (age 65); Toronto, Ontario, Canada

Sport
- Sport: Volleyball

Allan Coulter (born 15 December 1959) is a Canadian volleyball player. He competed at the 1984 Summer Olympics and the 1992 Summer Olympics.
