= Patrick Duflos =

French volleyball player (born 1965)

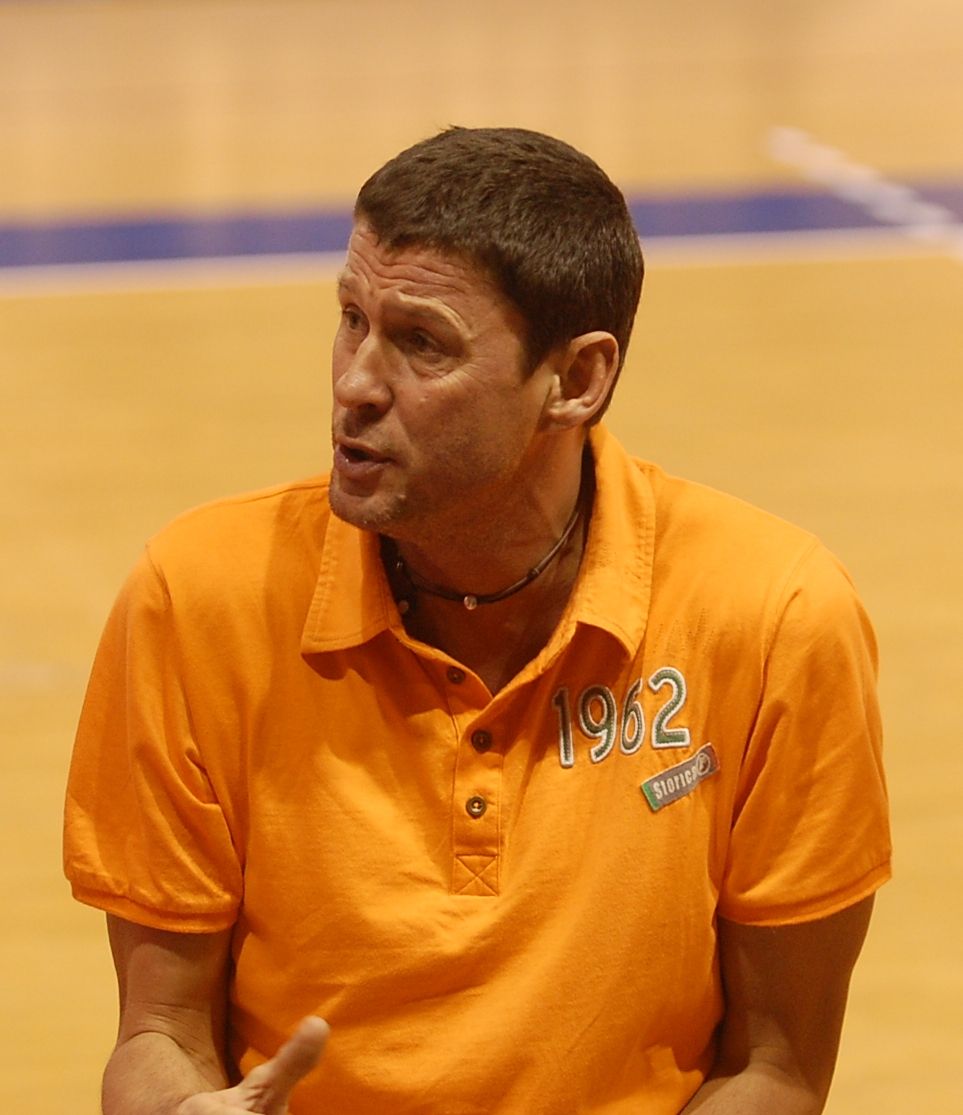
- Patrick Duflos in 2010

Personal information
- Nationality: French
- Born: 29 December 1965 (age 59); Calais, France

Sport
- Sport: Volleyball

Patrick Duflos (born 29 December 1965) is a French former volleyball player. He competed in the men's tournament at the 1988 Summer Olympics.
