= Ha Jong-hwa =

South Korean volleyball player (born 1969)

Personal information
- Nationality: South Korean
- Born: 28 August 1969 (age 55)

Sport
- Sport: Volleyball

Ha Jong-hwa (born 28 August 1969) is a South Korean volleyball player. He competed at the 1992 Summer Olympics and the 1996 Summer Olympics.
