= Terry Gagnon =

Canadian volleyball player (born 1962)

Personal information
- Born: 3 December 1962 (age 62); Edmonton, Alberta, Canada

Sport
- Sport: Volleyball

Terry Gagnon (born 3 December 1962) is a Canadian volleyball player. He competed in the men's tournament at the 1992 Summer Olympics.
