= Shigeru Aoyama =

Japanese volleyball player (born 1969)

Personal information
- Born: 27 April 1969 (age 57); Nagoya, Aichi, Japan
- Height: 1.87 m (6 ft 2 in)

Volleyball information
- Position: Outside hitter
- Number: 11

National team
1990–1997	Japan
Honours
Men's volleyball
Representing Japan
Asian Games
Gold medal – first place	1994 Hiroshima	Team
Bronze medal – third place	1990 Beijing	Team

Shigeru Aoyama (born 27 April 1969) is a Japanese former volleyball player who competed in the 1992 Summer Olympics in Barcelona.
