= Nayden Naydenov =

Bulgarian volleyball player and coach

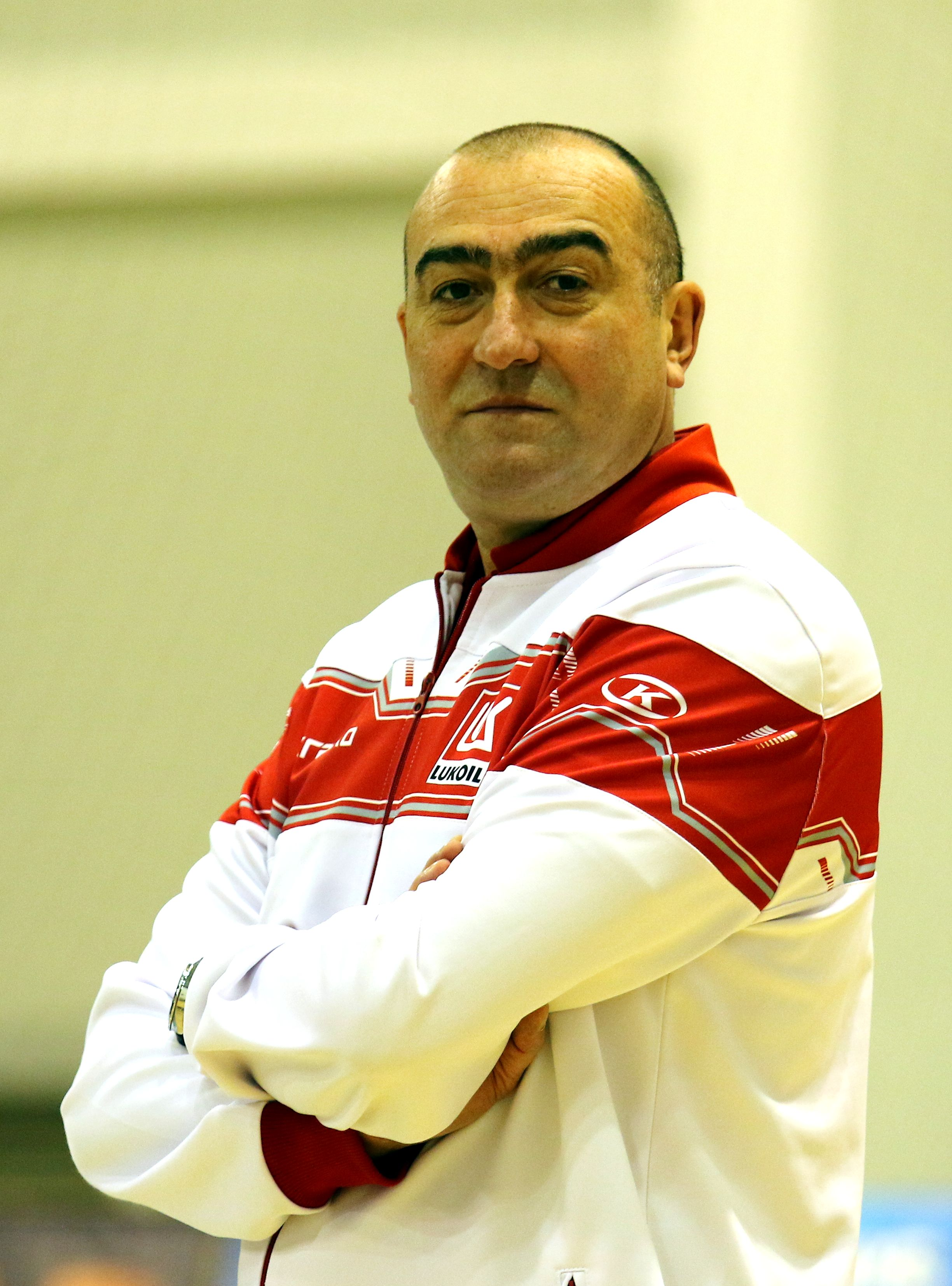

Personal information
- Nationality: Bulgarian
- Born: 25 May 1967 (age 59)
- Height: 197 cm (6 ft 6 in)

Career
Teams
	Iraklis Thessaloniki

National team
Bulgaria

Nayden Naydenov (Bulgarian: Найден Найденов) (born 25 May 1967) is a former Bulgarian male volleyball player and current coach. He was part of the Bulgaria men's national volleyball team at the 1988 Summer Olympics, the 1994 FIVB Volleyball Men's World Championship and the 1996 Summer Olympics. As of April 2025 he is coach of VC Lokomotiv Avia from Plovdiv.

== See also ==
- VC Marek Union-Ivkoni
- VC Lokomotiv Avia Plovdiv
