= Peter Tholse =

Swedish volleyball player (born 1965)

Personal information
- Nationality: Swedish
- Born: 6 October 1965 (age 61)
- Height: 203 cm (6 ft 8 in)
- Weight: 88 cm (2 ft 11 in)

Volleyball information
- Number: 14 (national team)

Career
Years	Teams
1990; 1994	(Italy) Mantua (Italy) Spoleto

National team
1988-1994	Sweden

Peter Tholse (born 6 October 1965) is a former Swedish male volleyball player. He was part of the Sweden men's national volleyball team at the 1988 Summer Olympics and 1990 FIVB Volleyball Men's World Championship. He played for Spoleto.

== Clubs ==
- (Italy) Mantua (1990)
- (Italy) Spoleto (1994)
