= Han Jang-sok =

South Korean volleyball player (born 1962)

Personal information
- Nationality: South Korean
- Born: 1 July 1962 (age 62)

Sport
- Sport: Volleyball

Han Jang-sok (born 1 July 1962) is a South Korean volleyball player. He competed in the men's tournament at the 1988 Summer Olympics.
