= Hiromichi Kageyama =

Japanese volleyball player (born 1967)

Personal information
- Born: 28 August 1967 (age 59); Isumi, Japan
- Height: 2.00 m (6 ft 7 in)

Volleyball information
- Position: Middle blocker
- Number: 7

National team
1988–1990	Japan

Hiromichi Kageyama (蔭山 弘道, Kageyama Hiromichi; born 28 August 1967) is a Japanese volleyball player. He competed in the men's tournament at the 1988 Summer Olympics in Seoul.
