= Lee Sang-yeol =

South Korean volleyball player (born 1966)

Personal information
- Nationality: South Korean
- Born: 9 March 1966 (age 59)

Sport
- Sport: Volleyball

Lee Sang-yeol (born 9 March 1966) is a South Korean volleyball player. He competed in the men's tournament at the 1988 Summer Olympics.
