= No Jin-su =

South Korean volleyball player (born 1965)

Personal information
- Nationality: South Korean
- Born: 21 March 1965 (age 60)

Sport
- Sport: Volleyball

No Jin-su (born 21 March 1965) is a South Korean volleyball player. He competed at the 1984 Summer Olympics and the 1992 Summer Olympics.
