= William Knight (volleyball) =

Canadian volleyball player (born 1964)

Personal information
- Born: 21 May 1964 (age 60); Ottawa, Ontario, Canada

Sport
- Sport: Volleyball

William Knight (born 21 May 1964) is a Canadian volleyball player. He competed in the men's tournament at the 1992 Summer Olympics.
