= Bengt Gustafson =

Swedish volleyball player (born 1963)

Personal information
- Nationality: Swedish
- Born: 17 May 1963 (age 61); Mölndal, Sweden

Sport
- Sport: Volleyball

Bengt Gustafson (born 17 May 1963) is a Sweden volleyball player. He competed in the men's tournament at the 1988 Summer Olympics.
