= Håkan Björne =

Swedish volleyball player (born 1964)

Personal information
- Nationality: Swedish
- Born: 13 March 1964 (age 61); Stockholm, Sweden

Sport
- Sport: Volleyball

Håkan Björne (born 13 March 1964) is a Sweden volleyball player. He competed in the men's tournament at the 1988 Summer Olympics.
