= Per-Anders Sääf =

Swedish volleyball player (born 1965)

Personal information
- Nationality: Swedish
- Born: 11 April 1965 (age 59); Halmstad, Sweden

Sport
- Sport: Volleyball

Per-Anders Sääf (born 11 April 1965) is a Swedish former volleyball player. He competed in the men's tournament at the 1988 Summer Olympics.
