= Edwin Benne =

Dutch volleyball player (born 1965)

Personal information
- Born: 21 April 1965 (age 61); Amersfoort, Utrecht, Netherlands
- Height: 208 cm (6 ft 10 in)

Volleyball information
- Position: Outside hitter
- Number: 10

National team
1987–1994	Netherlands
Honours
Men's volleyball
Representing the Netherlands
Olympic Games
Silver medal – second place	1992 Barcelona	Team
World Championship
Silver medal – second place	1994 Greece	Team
World League
Silver medal – second place	1990 Osaka
European Championship
Silver medal – second place	1993 Finland
Bronze medal – third place	1989 Sweden
Bronze medal – third place	1991 Germany

Edwin Johannes Benne (born 21 April 1965) is a retired volleyball player from the Netherlands who represented his native country at two consecutive Summer Olympics, starting in 1988. Benne was part of the Dutch national team that placed fifth at the 1988 Summer Olympics in Seoul, and won the silver medal four years later in Barcelona.

Benne received 382 caps during his international career.

== Coaching ==
Benne started his current position of head coach of the Dutch national team in 2011, leading them to a win at the 2012 European League and qualification to the 2013 World League.
