= Ron Boudrie =

Dutch volleyball player (born 1960)

Personal information
- Full name: Ronald Hermannes Boudrie
- Born: 6 April 1960 (age 66); The Hague, Netherlands
- Height: 201 cm (6 ft 7 in)

Volleyball information
- Position: Outside hitter
- Number: 5

National team
1988–1992	Netherlands
Honours
Men's volleyball
Representing the Netherlands
Olympic Games
Silver medal – second place	1992 Barcelona	Team
World League
Silver medal – second place	1990 Osaka
European Championship
Bronze medal – third place	1989 Sweden
Bronze medal – third place	1991 Germany

Ronald "Ron" Hermannes Boudrie (born 6 April 1960) is a retired volleyball player from the Netherlands who represented his native country at two consecutive Summer Olympics starting in 1988. He was part of the Netherlands men's national team that placed fifth at the 1988 Summer Olympics in Seoul, and won the silver medal four years later at the 1992 Summer Olympics in Barcelona.
