= Hervé Mazzon =

French volleyball player (born 1959)

Personal information
- Nationality: French
- Born: 12 June 1959 (age 65); Paris, France

Sport
- Sport: Volleyball

Hervé Mazzon (born 12 June 1959) is a French volleyball player. He competed in the men's tournament at the 1988 Summer Olympics.
