= Urban Lennartsson =

Swedish volleyball player (born 1962)

Personal information
- Nationality: Swedish
- Born: 2 May 1962 (age 62); Stockholm, Sweden

Sport
- Sport: Volleyball

Urban Lennartsson (born 2 May 1962) is a Swedish volleyball player. He competed in the men's tournament at the 1988 Summer Olympics.
