= Jan Hedengård =

Swedish volleyball player (born 1963)

Personal information
- Nationality: Swedish
- Born: 27 May 1963 (age 61); Malmö, Sweden

Sport
- Sport: Volleyball

Jan Hedengård (born 27 May 1963) is a Sweden volleyball player. He competed in the men's tournament at the 1988 Summer Olympics.
