= 1990 FIVB Men's Volleyball World Championship =

1990 FIVB World Championship
Tournament details
- Host country: Brazil
- Dates: 18–28 October
- Teams: 16
- Venues: 3 (in 3 host cities)
- Officially opened by: Fernando Collor de Mello

Final positions
- Champions: Italy (1st title)

The 1990 FIVB Men's World Championship was the twelfth edition of the tournament, organised by the world's governing body, the FIVB. It was held from 18 to 28 October 1990 in Brazil.

== Qualification ==
Means of qualification	Date	Host	Vacancies	Qualified
Host country	—N/a	—N/a	1	Brazil
1986 FIVB Men's Volleyball World Championship	25 Sep – 5 Oct 1986	France	7	United States
1986 FIVB Men's Volleyball World Championship	25 Sep – 5 Oct 1986	France	7	Soviet Union
1986 FIVB Men's Volleyball World Championship	25 Sep – 5 Oct 1986	France	7	Bulgaria
1986 FIVB Men's Volleyball World Championship	25 Sep – 5 Oct 1986	France	7	Cuba
1986 FIVB Men's Volleyball World Championship	25 Sep – 5 Oct 1986	France	7	France
1986 FIVB Men's Volleyball World Championship	25 Sep – 5 Oct 1986	France	7	Argentina
1986 FIVB Men's Volleyball World Championship	25 Sep – 5 Oct 1986	France	7	Czechoslovakia
1989 Men's European Volleyball Championship	23 Sep – 1 October 1989	Sweden	1	Italy
1989 Men's NORCECA Volleyball Championship	8–15 July 1989	(Puerto Rico) San Juan	1	Canada
1989 Men's South American Volleyball Championship	23–30 September 1989	(Brazil) Curitiba	1	Venezuela
1989 Asian Men's Volleyball Championship	15–24 September 1989	(South Korea) Seoul	1	South Korea
1989 Men's African Volleyball Championship	September 1989	(Ivory Coast) Abidjan	1	Cameroon
1990 FIVB Men's Volleyball World B Championship	12–22 April 1990	Japan	3	Sweden
1990 FIVB Men's Volleyball World B Championship	12–22 April 1990	Japan	3	Netherlands
1990 FIVB Men's Volleyball World B Championship	12–22 April 1990	Japan	3	Japan
Total			16	

== Venues ==
1990 FIVB Men's Volleyball World Championship (Brazil)	Pool A and Final round	Pool B, D and Final round	Pool C and Final round
1990 FIVB Men's Volleyball World Championship (Brazil)	Rio de Janeiro, Brazil	Brasília, Brazil	Curitiba, Brazil
1990 FIVB Men's Volleyball World Championship (Brazil)	Maracanãzinho	Nilson Nelson Gymnasium	Ginásio do Tarumã
1990 FIVB Men's Volleyball World Championship (Brazil)	Capacity: 11,800	Capacity: 24,286	Capacity: 4,555

== Results ==
=== First round ===
==== Pool A ====
Location: Rio de Janeiro

Pos	Team	Pld	W	L	Pts	SW	SL	SR	SPW	SPL	SPR	Qualification
1	Brazil	3	3	0	6	9	2	4.500	160	114	1.404	Quarterfinals
2	Sweden	3	2	1	5	8	6	1.333	201	172	1.169	Play-offs for quarterfinals
3	Czechoslovakia	3	1	2	4	5	8	0.625	129	170	0.759	Play-offs for quarterfinals
4	South Korea	3	0	3	3	3	9	0.333	143	177	0.808	13th–16th places

Date	Time		Score		Set 1	Set 2	Set 3	Set 4	Set 5	Total
18 Oct	16:00	Brazil	3–0	Czechoslovakia	15–7	15–7	15–9			45–23
18 Oct	18:30	Sweden	3–1	South Korea	15–8	15–11	16–17	15–10		61–46
19 Oct	16:00	Brazil	3–0	South Korea	15–8	15–4	15–7			45–19
19 Oct	18:30	Sweden	3–2	Czechoslovakia	12–15	15–9	11–15	15–4	15–13	68–56
20 Oct	16:00	Brazil	3–2	Sweden	15–17	16–14	8–15	16–14	15–12	70–72
20 Oct	18:30	Czechoslovakia	3–2	South Korea	15–11	5–15	15–11	14–16	15–11	64–64

==== Pool B ====
Location: Brasília

Pos	Team	Pld	W	L	Pts	SW	SL	SR	SPW	SPL	SPR	Qualification
1	Argentina	3	3	0	6	9	0	MAX	135	68	1.985	Quarterfinals
2	Netherlands	3	2	1	5	6	3	2.000	107	90	1.189	Play-offs for quarterfinals
3	Canada	3	1	2	4	3	7	0.429	113	134	0.843	Play-offs for quarterfinals
4	United States	3	0	3	3	1	9	0.111	87	150	0.580	13th–16th places

Date	Time		Score		Set 1	Set 2	Set 3	Set 4	Set 5	Total
18 Oct	18:30	Argentina	3–0	Canada	15–9	15–11	15–13			45–33
18 Oct	21:00	Netherlands	3–0	United States	15–7	15–12	15–6			45–25
19 Oct	18:30	Canada	3–1	United States	15–13	15–11	15–17	15–3		60–44
19 Oct	21:00	Argentina	3–0	Netherlands	15–7	15–3	15–7			45–17
20 Oct	12:30	Netherlands	3–0	Canada	15–3	15–9	15–8			45–20
20 Oct	21:00	Argentina	3–0	United States	15–3	15–8	15–7			45–18

==== Pool C ====
Location: Curitiba

Pos	Team	Pld	W	L	Pts	SW	SL	SR	SPW	SPL	SPR	Qualification
1	Soviet Union	3	3	0	6	9	0	MAX	135	53	2.547	Quarterfinals
2	France	3	2	1	5	6	3	2.000	114	102	1.118	Play-offs for quarterfinals
3	Japan	3	1	2	4	3	6	0.500	86	108	0.796	Play-offs for quarterfinals
4	Venezuela	3	0	3	3	0	9	0.000	65	137	0.474	13th–16th places

Date	Time		Score		Set 1	Set 2	Set 3	Set 4	Set 5	Total
18 Oct	18:30	Japan	3–0	Venezuela	15–6	15–4	15–8			45–18
18 Oct	21:00	Soviet Union	3–0	France	15–6	15–10	15–6			45–22
19 Oct	18:30	Soviet Union	3–0	Japan	15–10	15–7	15–1			45–18
19 Oct	21:00	France	3–0	Venezuela	15–11	17–15	15–8			47–34
20 Oct	18:30	France	3–0	Japan	15–7	15–11	15–5			45–23
20 Oct	21:00	Soviet Union	3–0	Venezuela	15–4	15–2	15–7			45–13

==== Pool D ====
Location: Brasília

Pos	Team	Pld	W	L	Pts	SW	SL	SR	SPW	SPL	SPR	Qualification
1	Cuba	3	3	0	6	9	2	4.500	154	119	1.294	Quarterfinals
2	Italy	3	2	1	5	6	4	1.500	132	103	1.282	Play-offs for quarterfinals
3	Bulgaria	3	1	2	4	6	6	1.000	147	137	1.073	Play-offs for quarterfinals
4	Cameroon	3	0	3	3	0	9	0.000	61	135	0.452	13th–16th places

Date	Time		Score		Set 1	Set 2	Set 3	Set 4	Set 5	Total
18 Oct	10:00	Italy	3–0	Cameroon	15–4	15–3	15–10			45–17
18 Oct	12:30	Cuba	3–2	Bulgaria	11–15	8–15	15–10	15–11	15–10	64–61
19 Oct	10:00	Cuba	3–0	Cameroon	15–8	15–9	15–11			45–28
19 Oct	12:30	Italy	3–1	Bulgaria	15–9	15–5	12–15	15–12		57–41
20 Oct	10:00	Bulgaria	3–0	Cameroon	15–3	15–5	15–8			45–16
20 Oct	18:30	Cuba	3–0	Italy	15–13	15–9	15–8			45–30

=== Final round ===
Play-off; 23 October – Brasília
France	3
Canada	1
Italy	3
Czechoslovakia	0
Sweden	0
Bulgaria	3
Netherlands	3
Japan	0

Quarterfinals; 26 October – Rio de Janeiro
Brazil	3
France	0
Argentina	0
Italy	3
Soviet Union	3
Bulgaria	0
Cuba	3
Netherlands	2

Semifinals; 27 October – Rio de Janeiro
Brazil	2
Italy	3
Soviet Union	1
Cuba	3

Final; 28 October – Rio de Janeiro
Italy	3
Cuba	1
Third place
Brazil	0
Soviet Union	3

5th–8th semifinals
27 October
France	0
Argentina	3
27 October
Bulgaria	3
Netherlands	2

5th place
28 October
Argentina	2
Bulgaria	3
7th place
28 October
France	1
Netherlands	3

==== Play-offs for quarterfinals ====
Location: Brasília

Date	Time		Score		Set 1	Set 2	Set 3	Set 4	Set 5	Total
23 Oct	10:00	France	3–1	Canada	15–3	12–15	17–15	15–9		59–42
23 Oct	12:30	Netherlands	3–0	Japan	15–4	15–12	15–3			45–19
23 Oct	18:30	Sweden	0–3	Bulgaria	7–15	12–15	10–15			29–45
23 Oct	21:00	Italy	3–0	Czechoslovakia	15–6	16–14	15–5			46–25

==== Group head matches ====
Location: Rio de Janeiro

Date	Time		Score		Set 1	Set 2	Set 3	Set 4	Set 5	Total
23 Oct		Cuba	3–2	Brazil	13–15	16–17	15–8	15–8	15–10	74–58
23 Oct		Argentina	3–2	Soviet Union	15–4	7–15	15–11	13–15	15–11	65–56

==== 13th–16th places ====
Location: Curitiba

Pos	Team	Pld	W	L	Pts	SW	SL	SR	SPW	SPL	SPR
13	United States	3	3	0	6	9	2	4.500	159	120	1.325
14	South Korea	3	2	1	5	6	3	2.000	124	87	1.425
15	Cameroon	3	1	2	4	4	6	0.667	109	124	0.879
16	Venezuela	3	0	3	3	1	9	0.111	88	149	0.591

Date	Time		Score		Set 1	Set 2	Set 3	Set 4	Set 5	Total
23 Oct		South Korea	3–0	Cameroon	15–10	15–2	15–7			45–19
23 Oct		United States	3–1	Venezuela	15–5	15–7	14–16	15–13		59–41
24 Oct		United States	3–0	South Korea	15–12	15–9	15–13			45–34
24 Oct		Cameroon	3–0	Venezuela	15–4	15–7	15–13			45–24
26 Oct		United States	3–1	Cameroon	15–9	15–10	10–15	15–11		55–45
26 Oct		South Korea	3–0	Venezuela	15–8	15–7	15–8			45–23

==== 9th–12th places ====
9th–12th semifinals
24 October – Brasília
Czechoslovakia	3
Canada	2
24 October – Brasília
Sweden	3
Japan	0

9th place
26 October – Brasília
Czechoslovakia	3
Sweden	0
11th place
26 October – Brasília
Canada	2
Japan	3

===== 9th–12th semifinals =====
Date	Time		Score		Set 1	Set 2	Set 3	Set 4	Set 5	Total
24 Oct		Czechoslovakia	3–2	Canada	15–4	15–11	5–15	5–15	15–10	55–55
24 Oct		Sweden	3–0	Japan	15–10	15–8	15–11			45–29

===== 11th place match =====
Date	Time		Score		Set 1	Set 2	Set 3	Set 4	Set 5	Total
26 Oct		Canada	2–3	Japan						

===== 9th place match =====
Date	Time		Score		Set 1	Set 2	Set 3	Set 4	Set 5	Total
26 Oct		Czechoslovakia	3–0	Sweden	15–9	15–4	15–7			45–20

==== Finals ====
===== Quarterfinals =====
Date	Time		Score		Set 1	Set 2	Set 3	Set 4	Set 5	Total
26 Oct		Brazil	3–0	France	15–8	15–0	15–9			45–17
26 Oct		Argentina	0–3	Italy	15–17	11–15	13–15			39–47
26 Oct		Soviet Union	3–0	Bulgaria	15–12	15–4	15–11			45–27
26 Oct		Cuba	3–2	Netherlands	8–15	15–10	11–15	17–15	15–9	66–64

===== 5th–8th semifinals =====
Date	Time		Score		Set 1	Set 2	Set 3	Set 4	Set 5	Total
27 Oct	10:00	Bulgaria	3–2	Netherlands	10–15	15–11	1–15	15–10	17–15	58–66
27 Oct	12:30	France	0–3	Argentina	13–15	14–16	11–15			38–46

===== Semifinals =====
Date	Time		Score		Set 1	Set 2	Set 3	Set 4	Set 5	Total
27 Oct	16:00	Brazil	2–3	Italy	15–6	9–15	8–15	15–8	13–15	60–59
27 Oct	18:30	Soviet Union	1–3	Cuba	15–7	12–15	9–15	11–15		47–52

===== 7th place match =====
Date	Time		Score		Set 1	Set 2	Set 3	Set 4	Set 5	Total
28 Oct		France	1–3	Netherlands	1–15	15–8	8–15	7–15		31–53

===== 5th place match =====
Date	Time		Score		Set 1	Set 2	Set 3	Set 4	Set 5	Total
28 Oct		Argentina	2–3	Bulgaria	15–7	16–14	10–15	12–15	10–15	63–66

===== 3rd place match =====
Date	Time		Score		Set 1	Set 2	Set 3	Set 4	Set 5	Total
28 Oct		Brazil	0–3	Soviet Union	8–15	8–15	4–15			20–45

===== Final =====
Date	Time		Score		Set 1	Set 2	Set 3	Set 4	Set 5	Total
28 Oct		Italy	3–1	Cuba	12–15	15–11	15–6	16–14		58–46

== Final standing ==
Rank	Team
1st place, gold medalist(s)	Italy
2nd place, silver medalist(s)	Cuba
3rd place, bronze medalist(s)	Soviet Union
4	Brazil
5	Bulgaria
6	Argentina
7	Netherlands
8	France
9	Czechoslovakia
10	Sweden
11	Japan
12	Canada
13	United States
14	South Korea
15	Cameroon
16	Venezuela

Qualified for the 1992 Summer Olympics

1990 Men's World champions

Italy
1st title

Team roster
Andrea Anastasi, Lorenzo Bernardi, Marco Bracci, Luca Cantagalli, Ferdinando De Giorgi, Andrea Gardini, Andrea Giani, Andrea Lucchetta, Marco Martinelli, Roberto Masciarelli, Paolo Tofoli, Andrea Zorzi
Head coach
Julio Velasco
