= 1994 FIVB Men's Volleyball World Championship squads =

Sixteen teams participated in the 1994 FIVB Men's Volleyball World Championship in Greece.

== Italy (1st) ==
#	Name	Date of Birth	Height	Club
1	Andrea Gardini	October 1, 1965 (aged 28)	202 cm (6 ft 8 in)	Sisley Treviso
2	Marco Martinelli	October 9, 1965 (aged 28)	200 cm (6 ft 7 in)	Gabeca Montichiari
3	Pasquale Gravina	May 1, 1970 (aged 24)	200 cm (6 ft 7 in)	Cariparma Parma
4	Ferdinando De Giorgi	October 10, 1961 (aged 32)	187 cm (6 ft 2 in)	Alpitour Traco Cuneo
5	Paolo Tofoli	August 14, 1966 (aged 28)	188 cm (6 ft 2 in)	Sisley Treviso
6	Samuele Papi	May 25, 1973 (aged 21)	190 cm (6 ft 3 in)	Alpitour Traco Cuneo
7	Andrea Sartoretti	June 19, 1971 (aged 23)	194 cm (6 ft 4 in)	Edilcuoghi Ravenna
8	Marco Bracci	August 23, 1966 (aged 28)	197 cm (6 ft 6 in)	Daytona Modena
9	Lorenzo Bernardi	August 11, 1968 (aged 26)	199 cm (6 ft 6 in)	Sisley Treviso
10	Luca Cantagalli	December 8, 1965 (aged 28)	198 cm (6 ft 6 in)	Daytona Modena
11	Andrea Zorzi	July 29, 1965 (aged 29)	201 cm (6 ft 7 in)	Sisley Treviso
12	Damiano Pippi	August 23, 1971 (aged 23)	193 cm (6 ft 4 in)	Gabeca Montichiari
13	Andrea Giani	April 22, 1970 (aged 24)	196 cm (6 ft 5 in)	Cariparma Parma
14	Davide Bellini	May 20, 1969 (aged 25)	196 cm (6 ft 5 in)	Edilcuoghi Ravenna
15	Michele Pasinato	March 13, 1969 (aged 25)	196 cm (6 ft 5 in)	Gabeca Montichiari
16	Marco Meoni	May 25, 1973 (aged 21)	197 cm (6 ft 6 in)	Ignis Padova
17	Mario Fangareggi	January 30, 1973 (aged 21)	202 cm (6 ft 8 in)	Edilcuoghi Ravenna
18	Giacono Giretto	January 5, 1973 (aged 21)	205 cm (6 ft 9 in)	Cariparma Parma

- Coach: Julio Velasco

== Netherlands (2nd) ==
#	Name	Date of Birth	Height	Club
1	Misha Latuhihin	December 28, 1970 (aged 23)	190 cm (6 ft 3 in)	Autodrop VCG
2	Arnold van Ree	August 23, 1966 (aged 28)	192 cm (6 ft 4 in)	Rentokil ZVH
3	Henk-Jan Held	November 12, 1967 (aged 26)	200 cm (6 ft 7 in)	Fochi Bologna (Italy)
4	Brecht Rodenburg	December 24, 1967 (aged 26)	202 cm (6 ft 8 in)	Renokil ZVH
5	Guido Gortzen	November 9, 1970 (aged 23)	198 cm (6 ft 6 in)	Autodrop VCG
6	Jan Posthuma	August 11, 1963 (aged 31)	209 cm (6 ft 10 in)	Gonzaga Milano (Italy)
7	Marco Klok	March 14, 1968 (aged 26)	194 cm (6 ft 4 in)	El Campero (Italy)
8	Ron Zwerver	June 6, 1967 (aged 27)	200 cm (6 ft 7 in)	Sisley Treviso (Italy)
9	Bas van de Goor	September 4, 1971 (aged 23)	209 cm (6 ft 10 in)	Piet Zoomers
10	Edwin Benne	April 21, 1965 (aged 29)	208 cm (6 ft 10 in)	Paris IC (France)
11	Olof van der Meulen	November 8, 1968 (aged 25)	201 cm (6 ft 7 in)	Com.Cavi Napoli (Italy)
12	Peter Blangé	December 9, 1964 (aged 29)	205 cm (6 ft 9 in)	Cariparma Parma (Italy)
13	Robert Graber	February 5, 1964 (aged 30)	198 cm (6 ft 6 in)	Latte Giglio Reggio Emilia (Italy)
14	Martin van der Horst	April 2, 1965 (aged 29)	212 cm (6 ft 11 in)	ASV Dachau (Germany)
15	Ronald Zoodsma	September 5, 1966 (aged 28)	200 cm (6 ft 7 in)	Gabeca Montichiari (Italy)
16	Mike van de Goor	May 14, 1973 (aged 21)	208 cm (6 ft 10 in)	Piet Zoomers
17	Robert van Es	November 11, 1975 (aged 18)	204 cm (6 ft 8 in)	Alcom Capelle
18	Mark Lentelina	September 23, 1972 (aged 22)	201 cm (6 ft 7 in)	Exakta Bovo

- Coach: Joop Alberda

== United States (3rd) ==
#	Name	Date of Birth	Height	Club
1	Lloy Ball	February 17, 1972 (aged 22)	201 cm (6 ft 7 in)	IPFW
2	Daniel Greenbaum	March 12, 1969 (aged 25)	192 cm (6 ft 4 in)	USC
3	Scott Metcalf	September 16, 1969 (aged 25)	201 cm (6 ft 7 in)	George Mason
4	Robert Ctvrtlik	July 8, 1963 (aged 31)	193 cm (6 ft 4 in)	Pepperdine Un.
5	Bryan Ivie	May 5, 1969 (aged 25)	201 cm (6 ft 7 in)	USC
6	Tom Sorensen	April 6, 1971 (aged 23)	198 cm (6 ft 6 in)	Pepperdine Un.
7	Brent Hilliard	April 13, 1970 (aged 24)	196 cm (6 ft 5 in)	Long Beach State
8	Scott Fortune	January 23, 1966 (aged 28)	198 cm (6 ft 6 in)	Stanford Un.
9	Robert Samuelson	July 30, 1966 (aged 28)	196 cm (6 ft 5 in)	C.S. Northridge
10	Duncan Blackman	May 21, 1970 (aged 24)	196 cm (6 ft 5 in)	Stanford Un.
11	Eric Sato	May 5, 1966 (aged 28)	181 cm (5 ft 11 in)	Santa Monica CC.
12	Dexter Rogers	April 30, 1969 (aged 25)	192 cm (6 ft 4 in)	Westmar
13	Jeff Nygaard	August 3, 1972 (aged 22)	203 cm (6 ft 8 in)	UCLA
14	Duane Cameron	July 2, 1971 (aged 23)	198 cm (6 ft 6 in)	Pepperdine Un.
15	Ethan Matts	May 4, 1972 (aged 22)	201 cm (6 ft 7 in)	BYU
16	Daniel Landry	January 15, 1970 (aged 24)	195 cm (6 ft 5 in)	Long Beach State
17	Brett Winslow	September 8, 1967 (aged 27)	196 cm (6 ft 5 in)	Long Beach State
18	Jason Stimpfing	February 19, 1971 (aged 23)	176 cm (5 ft 9 in)	Long Beach State

== Cuba (4th) ==
#	Name	Date of Birth	Height	Club
1	Freddy Brooks	August 10, 1969 (aged 25)	187 cm (6 ft 2 in)	Baracoa
2	Nicolas Vives	April 24, 1970 (aged 24)	192 cm (6 ft 4 in)	Cruces
3	Ricardo Vantes	April 21, 1967 (aged 27)	191 cm (6 ft 3 in)	Camaguey
4	Joel Despaigne	July 2, 1966 (aged 28)	194 cm (6 ft 4 in)	C. Cuba
5	Idalberto Valdés	April 14, 1967 (aged 27)	195 cm (6 ft 5 in)	C. Habana
6	Gilman Cao	March 30, 1972 (aged 22)	195 cm (6 ft 5 in)	C. Habana
7	Felix Millan	October 13, 1967 (aged 26)	198 cm (6 ft 6 in)	C. Habana
8	Rodolfo Sanchez	May 27, 1969 (aged 25)	197 cm (6 ft 6 in)	P. Rio
9	Raúl Diago	August 1, 1967 (aged 27)	191 cm (6 ft 3 in)	Matanzas
10	Abel Sarmientos	July 22, 1962 (aged 32)	195 cm (6 ft 5 in)	Esmeralda
11	Osvaldo Hernandez	July 11, 1970 (aged 24)	199 cm (6 ft 6 in)	Camaguey
12	Ramon Gato	November 16, 1973 (aged 20)	192 cm (6 ft 4 in)	Camaguey
13	Nicolas Alfonso	January 26, 1969 (aged 25)	196 cm (6 ft 5 in)	C. Habana
14	Ihosvany Hernández	August 6, 1972 (aged 22)	206 cm (6 ft 9 in)	S. Habana
15	Alexei Diaz	April 22, 1972 (aged 22)	202 cm (6 ft 8 in)	C. Habana
16	German Izaguirre	February 6, 1974 (aged 20)	197 cm (6 ft 6 in)	C. Habana
17	Alexis Batle	July 28, 1971 (aged 23)	190 cm (6 ft 3 in)	V. Clara
18	Lázaro Marín	March 30, 1967 (aged 27)	198 cm (6 ft 6 in)	S. Habaoa

- Coach: Marino Juan Diaz

== Brazil (5th) ==
#	Name	Date of Birth	Height	Club
1	Marcelo Teles Negrão	October 10, 1972 (aged 21)	198 cm (6 ft 6 in)	Telesp S. Paulo
2	Jorge Edson Brito	October 13, 1966 (aged 27)	192 cm (6 ft 4 in)	Palmeiras S.Paulo
3	Giovane Gávio	September 7, 1970 (aged 24)	196 cm (6 ft 5 in)	Palmeiras S.Paulo
4	Gilmar Teixeira	October 30, 1970 (aged 23)	193 cm (6 ft 4 in)	Nossa Caixa Suzano
5	Paulo André Silva	December 24, 1963 (aged 30)	201 cm (6 ft 7 in)	Cocamar
6	Mauricio Camargo Lima	January 27, 1968 (aged 26)	184 cm (6 ft 0 in)	Telesp S.Paulo
7	Fábio Marcelino	March 11, 1973 (aged 21)	195 cm (6 ft 5 in)	Fiat Minas Belo Horizonte
8	Douglas Chiarotti	November 10, 1970 (aged 23)	200 cm (6 ft 7 in)	Banespa S.Paulo
9	Antonio Carlos Gouveia	April 20, 1965 (aged 29)	198 cm (6 ft 6 in)	Frangosul Novo Hamburgo
10	Max Pereira	January 27, 1970 (aged 24)	198 cm (6 ft 6 in)	Nossa Caixa Suzano
11	Janelson Carvalho	March 24, 1969 (aged 25)	195 cm (6 ft 5 in)	Banespa S.Paulo
12	Nalbert Bitencourt	March 9, 1974 (aged 20)	195 cm (6 ft 5 in)	Fiat Minas Belo Horizonte
13	Carlos Toaldo	June 21, 1970 (aged 24)	201 cm (6 ft 7 in)	Banespa S.Paulo
14	Alexandre Samuel	May 20, 1970 (aged 24)	201 cm (6 ft 7 in)	Flamengo Rio Janeiro
15	Talmo Curto Oliveira	October 10, 1969 (aged 24)	194 cm (6 ft 4 in)	Palmeiras S.Paulo
16	Gilson Bernardo	February 20, 1968 (aged 26)	192 cm (6 ft 4 in)	Palmeiras S.Paulo
17	Cássio Pereira	December 7, 1971 (aged 22)	187 cm (6 ft 2 in)	Nossa Caixa Suzano
18	Carlos Schwanke	November 5, 1974 (aged 19)	198 cm (6 ft 6 in)	Fiat Minas Belo Horizonte

- Coach: José Roberto Guimarães

== Greece (6th) ==
#	Name	Date of Birth	Height	Club
1	Chrysanthos Kyriazis	April 21, 1972 (aged 22)	195 cm (6 ft 5 in)	Ktisifon Paianias
2	Marios Giourdas	March 2, 1973 (aged 21)	202 cm (6 ft 8 in)	Ethnikos Alexandroupolis V.C.
3	Theodoros Chatziantoniou	March 16, 1974 (aged 20)	204 cm (6 ft 8 in)	Panathinaikos
4	Konstantinos Agelidis	March 19, 1973 (aged 21)	192 cm (6 ft 4 in)	Ktisifon Paianias
5	Nikolas Mouchlias	March 5, 1969 (aged 25)	201 cm (6 ft 7 in)	Aris Thessaloniki
6	Thanassis Moustakidis	February 20, 1962 (aged 32)	186 cm (6 ft 1 in)	Olympiacos Piraeus
7	Pavlos Karamaroudis	August 13, 1967 (aged 27)	204 cm (6 ft 8 in)	Panathinaikos
8	Thanassis Panoussos	October 16, 1971 (aged 22)	198 cm (6 ft 6 in)	Milon N.Smyrnis
9	Nikos Samaras	July 1, 1970 (aged 24)	200 cm (6 ft 7 in)	Orestiada
10	Antonios Tsakiropoulos	July 1, 1969 (aged 25)	205 cm (6 ft 9 in)	Orestiada
11	Georgios Ntrakovits	October 20, 1968 (aged 25)	200 cm (6 ft 7 in)	Olympiacos Piraeus
12	Dimitris Andreopulos	October 25, 1964 (aged 29)	187 cm (6 ft 2 in)	Panathinaikos
13	Andreas Theodoridis	March 23, 1968 (aged 26)	203 cm (6 ft 8 in)	Olympiacos Piraeus
14	Sotiris Amarianakis	June 13, 1965 (aged 29)	203 cm (6 ft 8 in)	Olympiacos Piraeus
15	Theodoros Bozidis	April 8, 1973 (aged 21)	196 cm (6 ft 5 in)	Orestiada
16	Thanassis Michalopoulos	June 19, 1973 (aged 21)	197 cm (6 ft 6 in)	Olympiacos Piraeus
17	Charalambos Rigas	May 13, 1970 (aged 24)	202 cm (6 ft 8 in)	PAOK Thessaloniki
18	Georgios Spanos	October 30, 1964 (aged 29)	190 cm (6 ft 3 in)	Panathinaikos

- Coach: Gilberto Herrera

== Russia (7th) ==
#	Name	Date of Birth	Height	Club
1	Oleg Shatunov	February 21, 1967 (aged 27)	203 cm (6 ft 8 in)	Hiroshima (Japan)
2	Andrei Kouznetsov	April 23, 1966 (aged 28)	196 cm (6 ft 5 in)	Les Copains Ferrara (Italy)
3	Serguei Orlenko	February 10, 1971 (aged 23)	200 cm (6 ft 7 in)	CSKA Moscow
4	Rouslan Olikhver	April 11, 1969 (aged 25)	201 cm (6 ft 7 in)	Daytono Modena (Italy)
5	Ilja Saveljev	June 10, 1971 (aged 23)	200 cm (6 ft 7 in)	Cariparma Parma (Italy)
6	Evgueni Krassilnikov	April 7, 1965 (aged 29)	191 cm (6 ft 3 in)	Halkbank Ankara (Turkey)
7	Rouslan Tchigrine	October 17, 1971 (aged 22)	200 cm (6 ft 7 in)	Automobilist S.Pietroburgo
8	Dmitry Fomin	January 21, 1968 (aged 26)	200 cm (6 ft 7 in)	Edilcuoghi Ravenna (Italy)
9	Stanislav Chevtcthenko	November 1, 1970 (aged 23)	196 cm (6 ft 5 in)	CSKA Moscow
10	Pavel Shishkin	April 11, 1970 (aged 24)	200 cm (6 ft 7 in)	Fochi Bologna (Italy)
11	Konstantin Ouchakov	March 24, 1970 (aged 24)	198 cm (6 ft 6 in)	CSKA Moscow
12	Youri Cherednik	June 25, 1966 (aged 28)	203 cm (6 ft 8 in)	Lube Treia (Italy)
13	Konstantin Sidenko	January 2, 1974 (aged 20)	196 cm (6 ft 5 in)	CSKA Rostov
14	Stanislav Dineikine	October 10, 1973 (aged 20)	215 cm (7 ft 1 in)	Dinamo Moscow
15	Igor Kournossov	October 20, 1967 (aged 26)	192 cm (6 ft 4 in)	CSKA Moscow
16	Evgueni Mitkov	March 23, 1972 (aged 22)	194 cm (6 ft 4 in)	Sever Novosibirsk
17	Valeri Gordiushev	April 26, 1973 (aged 21)	198 cm (6 ft 6 in)	Dinamo Moscow
18	Serguei Ermichine	June 4, 1973 (aged 21)	207 cm (6 ft 9 in)	CSKA Moscow

== South Korea (8th) ==
#	Name	Date of Birth	Height	Club
1	Ha Jong-hwa	August 28, 1969 (aged 25)	195 cm (6 ft 5 in)	Hyundai
2	Im Do-hun	June 8, 1972 (aged 22)	195 cm (6 ft 5 in)	Hyundai
3	Park Sam-ryong	June 7, 1968 (aged 26)	191 cm (6 ft 3 in)	Sang Mu
4	Shin Jung-sub	May 30, 1974 (aged 20)	200 cm (6 ft 7 in)	Hyan Yang Univ.
5	Shin Young-chul	March 14, 1964 (aged 30)	179 cm (5 ft 10 in)	Kepco
6	Kang Sung-hyung	May 7, 1970 (aged 24)	189 cm (6 ft 2 in)	Hyundai
7	Kim Sang-woo	July 7, 1973 (aged 21)	195 cm (6 ft 5 in)	S.K.K.Univ.
8	Kim Byung-sun	January 3, 1973 (aged 21)	200 cm (6 ft 7 in)	S.K.K.Univ.
9	Park Jong-chan	January 15, 1970 (aged 24)	194 cm (6 ft 4 in)	Hyundai
10	Jae Hee-kyung	December 13, 1969 (aged 24)	202 cm (6 ft 8 in)	Hyundai
11	Lee In-koo	February 2, 1975 (aged 19)	200 cm (6 ft 7 in)	Hyan Yang Univ.
12	Park Hee-sang	August 1, 1972 (aged 22)	190 cm (6 ft 3 in)	In Ha Univ.
13	Jin Chang-wook	July 18, 1972 (aged 22)	193 cm (6 ft 4 in)	Hyundai
14	Lee Sung-hee	September 26, 1967 (aged 27)	182 cm (6 ft 0 in)	Sang Mu
15	Moon Byung-taik	June 13, 1971 (aged 23)	195 cm (6 ft 5 in)	Koryo Securities
16	Koo Bon-wang	May 18, 1972 (aged 22)	200 cm (6 ft 7 in)	Kyungki Univ.
17	Kim Chul-soo	August 13, 1970 (aged 24)	187 cm (6 ft 2 in)	Kepco
18	Kim Se-jin	January 30, 1974 (aged 20)	200 cm (6 ft 7 in)	Han Yang Univ.

- Coach: In-Taik Yang

== Bulgaria (9th) ==
#	Name	Date of Birth	Height	Club
1	Martin Stoev	December 3, 1971 (aged 22)	189 cm (6 ft 2 in)	Orestiada (Greece)
2	Lyudmil Naydenov	September 4, 1970 (aged 24)	194 cm (6 ft 4 in)	Olympiakos Atene (Greece)
3	Georgi Petrov	October 22, 1969 (aged 24)	190 cm (6 ft 3 in)	Levsky Sofia
4	Lubomir Ganev	October 6, 1965 (aged 28)	210 cm (6 ft 11 in)	Alpitour Cuneo (Italy)
5	Ventzislav Todorov	March 13, 1967 (aged 27)	187 cm (6 ft 2 in)	CSKA Sofia
7	Nikolay Jeliazkov	February 26, 1970 (aged 24)	198 cm (6 ft 6 in)	Flamengo Rio Janeiro (Brazil)
8	Ivan Tasev	March 21, 1967 (aged 27)	188 cm (6 ft 2 in)	Ommonia
9	Kalin Todorov	March 8, 1971 (aged 23)	196 cm (6 ft 5 in)	CSKA Sofia
10	Peter Uzunov	January 19, 1971 (aged 23)	198 cm (6 ft 6 in)	Panatinaikos (Greece)
11	Nayden Naydenov	May 25, 1967 (aged 27)	197 cm (6 ft 6 in)	Iraklis (Greece)
12	Nikolai Ivanov	June 14, 1971 (aged 23)	192 cm (6 ft 4 in)	CSKA Sofia
13	Ivaylo Stefanov	July 19, 1973 (aged 21)	202 cm (6 ft 8 in)	Levsky Sofia
13	Dimo Tonev	July 2, 1964 (aged 30)	205 cm (6 ft 9 in)	Olympiakos Atene (Greece)
14	Ivaylo Gavrilov	December 30, 1970 (aged 23)	198 cm (6 ft 6 in)	Moka Rica Forlì (Italy)
15	Dimitar Bojilov	June 1, 1964 (aged 30)	190 cm (6 ft 3 in)	Levsky Sofia
16	Eugeni Ivanov	June 3, 1974 (aged 20)	204 cm (6 ft 8 in)	CSKA Sofia
17	Plamen Konstantinov	June 14, 1973 (aged 21)	200 cm (6 ft 7 in)	Slavia Sofia
18	Petar Iliev	September 2, 1973 (aged 21)	197 cm (6 ft 6 in)	CSKA Sofia

- Coach: Brunko Gavrilov

== Canada (9th) ==
#	Name	Date of Birth	Height	Club
1	Russ Paddock	August 2, 1966 (aged 28)	202 cm (6 ft 8 in)	Berlin (Germany)
2	Sthephane Gosselin	June 17, 1970 (aged 24)	186 cm (6 ft 1 in)	National Team
3	Keith Sanheim	March 1, 1970 (aged 24)	201 cm (6 ft 7 in)	Wuppertal (Germany)
4	Kent Greves	April 29, 1968 (aged 26)	189 cm (6 ft 2 in)	National Team
5	Steve Smith	March 29, 1967 (aged 27)	192 cm (6 ft 4 in)	National Team
6	Jeff Chung	January 8, 1974 (aged 20)	186 cm (6 ft 1 in)	National Team
7	Bruce Edwards	November 17, 1970 (aged 23)	195 cm (6 ft 5 in)	National Team
8	Mike Chaloupka	June 27, 1971 (aged 23)	200 cm (6 ft 7 in)	National Team
9	Dustin Reid	May 4, 1974 (aged 20)	188 cm (6 ft 2 in)	National Team
10	Gino Brousseau	September 4, 1966 (aged 28)	189 cm (6 ft 2 in)	Paris (France)
11	Andy Cameron	May 27, 1970 (aged 24)	197 cm (6 ft 6 in)	National Team
12	Randy Gingera	April 25, 1968 (aged 26)	190 cm (6 ft 3 in)	Zellick (Belgium)
13	Jay Magus	May 29, 1971 (aged 23)	196 cm (6 ft 5 in)	National Team
14	Simon Berleur	August 14, 1971 (aged 23)	190 cm (6 ft 3 in)	National Team
15	Jason Haldane	July 23, 1971 (aged 23)	202 cm (6 ft 8 in)	National Team
16	Paul Duerden	October 22, 1974 (aged 19)	195 cm (6 ft 5 in)	National Team
17	Francois Bilodeau	June 3, 1973 (aged 21)	196 cm (6 ft 5 in)	National Team
18	Geoff White	July 22, 1974 (aged 20)	200 cm (6 ft 7 in)	National Team

- Coach: Clement Lemieux

== Japan (9th) ==
#	Name	Date of Birth	Height	Club
1	Takashi Narita	October 6, 1969 (aged 24)	185 cm (6 ft 1 in)	Fuji Film
2	Hideaki Kobayashi	September 28, 1969 (aged 25)	185 cm (6 ft 1 in)	NEC Blue Rockets
3	Yuichi Nakagaichi	November 2, 1967 (aged 26)	193 cm (6 ft 4 in)	Nippon Steel
4	Akihiko Matsuda	June 22, 1965 (aged 29)	180 cm (5 ft 11 in)	Nisshin Steel
5	Kenji Yamamoto	February 12, 1970 (aged 24)	168 cm (5 ft 6 in)	JT
6	Masafumi Oura	September 28, 1969 (aged 25)	187 cm (6 ft 2 in)	Suntory
7	Satoru Nonoyama	February 4, 1971 (aged 23)	196 cm (6 ft 5 in)	Nippon Steel
8	Masaji Ogino	January 8, 1970 (aged 24)	191 cm (6 ft 3 in)	Suntory
9	Hiroyuki Minami	August 1, 1972 (aged 22)	200 cm (6 ft 7 in)	Hosei University
10	Katsuyuki Minami	September 30, 1970 (aged 23)	200 cm (6 ft 7 in)	Asahi Kasei
11	Shigeru Aoyama	April 27, 1969 (aged 25)	187 cm (6 ft 2 in)	Fuji Film
12	Taichi Sasaky	December 14, 1971 (aged 22)	193 cm (6 ft 4 in)	Suntory
13	Minoru Takeuchi	February 23, 1971 (aged 23)	190 cm (6 ft 3 in)	NEC Blue Rockets
14	Hideyuki Otake	July 16, 1967 (aged 27)	208 cm (6 ft 10 in)	NEC Blue Rockets
15	Masayuki Izumikawa	January 22, 1971 (aged 23)	196 cm (6 ft 5 in)	Toray
16	Norihiko Miyazaki	September 1, 1969 (aged 25)	192 cm (6 ft 4 in)	Matsushita Denki
17	Sadao Uoi	June 2, 1969 (aged 25)	185 cm (6 ft 1 in)	Sumitono Kinzoku
18	Ryuya Osuki	May 2, 1970 (aged 24)	197 cm (6 ft 6 in)	NEC Blue Rockets

- Coach: Seiji Oko

== China (13th) ==
#	Name	Date of Birth	Height	Club
1	Weng Yiqing	September 6, 1967 (aged 27)	204 cm (6 ft 8 in)	Shanghai
2	Zhang Di	May 4, 1973 (aged 21)	194 cm (6 ft 4 in)	Army
3	Li Haiyun	March 29, 1969 (aged 25)	202 cm (6 ft 8 in)	Liaoning
4	Hou Jing	April 22, 1966 (aged 28)	188 cm (6 ft 2 in)	Army
5	Li Mu	July 10, 1973 (aged 21)	201 cm (6 ft 7 in)	Beijing
6	Lu Weizhong	September 29, 1973 (aged 21)	198 cm (6 ft 6 in)	Jiangsu
7	Zhang Liming	May 3, 1969 (aged 25)	192 cm (6 ft 4 in)	Sichuan
8	Zhou Jianan	April 17, 1965 (aged 29)	190 cm (6 ft 3 in)	Sichuan
9	Chen Feng	June 11, 1969 (aged 25)	192 cm (6 ft 4 in)	Jiangsu
10	Zheng Liang	May 3, 1969 (aged 25)	201 cm (6 ft 7 in)	Zhejiang
12	Zhang Xiang	May 30, 1971 (aged 23)	192 cm (6 ft 4 in)	Sichuan
13	Yan Feng	January 18, 1970 (aged 24)	196 cm (6 ft 5 in)	Hubei
14	An Jiajie	July 17, 1973 (aged 21)	200 cm (6 ft 7 in)	Shandong
15	Xie Guochen	March 2, 1973 (aged 21)	195 cm (6 ft 5 in)	Henan

- Coach: Fulin Shen

== Argentina (13th) ==
#	Name	Date of Birth	Height	Club
2	Jorge Alberto Elgueta	November 22, 1969 (aged 24)	196 cm (6 ft 5 in)	Obras Sanitarias S.Juan
3	Gustavo Adrian Palonsky	June 25, 1968 (aged 26)	196 cm (6 ft 5 in)	National Team
4	Enrique Valle	February 21, 1971 (aged 23)	190 cm (6 ft 3 in)	National Team
5	Guillermo Quaini	November 6, 1971 (aged 22)	195 cm (6 ft 5 in)	National Team
6	Carlos Javier Weber	January 6, 1966 (aged 28)	180 cm (5 ft 11 in)	National Team
7	Fernando Borrero	December 15, 1968 (aged 25)	201 cm (6 ft 7 in)	National Team
8	Alejandro Romano	May 4, 1974 (aged 20)	192 cm (6 ft 4 in)	National Team
9	Fabian Barrionuevo	September 11, 1973 (aged 21)	194 cm (6 ft 4 in)	Obras Sanitarias S.Juan
10	Camilo Soto	June 25, 1975 (aged 19)	185 cm (6 ft 1 in)	Picun Leufu
11	Sebastian Jabif	January 24, 1973 (aged 21)	190 cm (6 ft 3 in)	Banade
12	Christian Lares	January 18, 1974 (aged 20)	197 cm (6 ft 6 in)	Banade
13	Adrian Garrido	December 13, 1967 (aged 26)	197 cm (6 ft 6 in)	National Team
14	Eduardo Rodriguez	December 15, 1971 (aged 22)	197 cm (6 ft 6 in)	National Team
15	Pablo Pereira	January 18, 1974 (aged 20)	190 cm (6 ft 3 in)	Banade
16	Martin Apel	February 21, 1966 (aged 28)	178 cm (5 ft 10 in)	National Team
17	Fabio Diez	November 18, 1965 (aged 28)	191 cm (6 ft 3 in)	National Team
18	Alejandro Raúl Spajic Torres	May 7, 1975 (aged 19)	205 cm (6 ft 9 in)	Obras Sanitarias S.Juan

- Coach: Daniel Castellani

== Sweden (13th) ==
#	Name	Date of Birth	Height	Club
1	Johan Isacsson	March 13, 1962 (aged 32)	190 cm (6 ft 3 in)	Fenerbache (Turkey)
2	Magnus Hallo	August 2, 1972 (aged 22)	189 cm (6 ft 2 in)	Kungalv
3	David Andersson	November 30, 1971 (aged 22)	194 cm (6 ft 4 in)	Uppsala
4	Jacek Krzeszczakowski	August 28, 1971 (aged 23)	194 cm (6 ft 4 in)	Hylte
5	Jan Hedengard	May 27, 1963 (aged 31)	185 cm (6 ft 1 in)	Moers (Germany)
6	Jorgen Eriksson	January 15, 1972 (aged 22)	199 cm (6 ft 6 in)	Orkelljunga
7	Jonas Svantesson	September 10, 1972 (aged 22)	200 cm (6 ft 7 in)	Umeå
8	Kristian Wrethander	May 21, 1971 (aged 23)	190 cm (6 ft 3 in)	Hylte
9	Mikael Kjellstrom	August 2, 1971 (aged 23)	203 cm (6 ft 8 in)	Hylte
10	Per-Anders Saaf	April 11, 1965 (aged 29)	200 cm (6 ft 7 in)	Lamas Castellana Grotte (Italy)
11	Oscar Swirhun	October 6, 1970 (aged 23)	197 cm (6 ft 6 in)	Sollentuna
12	Kenth Soderstrom	June 8, 1971 (aged 23)	201 cm (6 ft 7 in)	Umeå
13	Lars Nilsson	March 11, 1965 (aged 29)	201 cm (6 ft 7 in)	Berlin (Germany)
14	Peter Tholse	October 6, 1965 (aged 28)	203 cm (6 ft 8 in)	Spoleto (Italy)
15	Lars Persson	June 16, 1968 (aged 26)	201 cm (6 ft 7 in)	Sollentuna
16	Niclas Tornberg	May 4, 1971 (aged 23)	190 cm (6 ft 3 in)	Sollentuna
17	Bengt Nilsson	December 18, 1970 (aged 23)	190 cm (6 ft 3 in)	Orkelljunga
18	Johan Oswan	September 22, 1972 (aged 22)	195 cm (6 ft 5 in)	Uppsala

- Coach: Anders Kristiansson

== Algeria (13th) ==
#	Name	Date of Birth	Height	Club
1	Tarik Nehai	November 22, 1969 (aged 24)	192 cm (6 ft 4 in)	M.C.Algeri
2	Ali Dif	January 8, 1964 (aged 30)	202 cm (6 ft 8 in)	La Marsa (Tunisia)
3	Tyes Tiri Oualou	March 23, 1965 (aged 29)	190 cm (6 ft 3 in)	Tabac Sport. Mar
4	Karnel Rabia	January 31, 1967 (aged 27)	191 cm (6 ft 3 in)	U.S.M.Blida
5	El Hadi Benkhelfallah Tayeb	January 18, 1970 (aged 24)	196 cm (6 ft 5 in)	M.U.C.Montpellier (France)
6	Faycal Bencharif Hamida	August 13, 1970 (aged 24)	195 cm (6 ft 5 in)	U.S.M.Blida
7	Morad Sennoun	January 29, 1962 (aged 32)	190 cm (6 ft 3 in)	M.J.C.Narbonne
8	Samir Ferad	March 21, 1972 (aged 22)	195 cm (6 ft 5 in)	NA Hussein Dey
9	Billel Meddah	July 15, 1976 (aged 18)	192 cm (6 ft 4 in)	O.M. Medea
10	Adel Chabi	February 28, 1971 (aged 23)	193 cm (6 ft 4 in)	NA Hussein Dey
11	Krimo Bernaoui	January 24, 1967 (aged 27)	188 cm (6 ft 2 in)	Vigo (Spain)
12	Mohamed Adel Sennoun	September 1, 1967 (aged 27)	192 cm (6 ft 4 in)	M.C.Algeri
13	Faycal Gharzouli	January 9, 1970 (aged 24)	186 cm (6 ft 1 in)	U.S.M.Setif
14	Faycal Tellouche	September 3, 1968 (aged 26)	190 cm (6 ft 3 in)	O.M. Medea
15	Nassim Hedroug	November 24, 1975 (aged 18)	190 cm (6 ft 3 in)	O.S.El Kseur
16	Ouahmed Nabil Yaria	February 1, 1972 (aged 22)	192 cm (6 ft 4 in)	E.C.Sidi.Moussa
17	Hillal Sahooun	April 13, 1973 (aged 21)	192 cm (6 ft 4 in)	O.M. Medea
18	Mohamed Bentaleb	March 2, 1968 (aged 26)	190 cm (6 ft 3 in)	U.S.M.Blida

- Coach: Slimane Abderrahmane
