= Volleyball at the 1996 Summer Olympics – Men's team rosters =

Below you'll find all participating squads of the 1996 Men's Olympic Volleyball Tournament, organised by the world's governing body, the FIVB in conjunction with the IOC. It was held from 21 July to 4 August 1996 in the Stegeman Coliseum and the Omni Coliseum of The University of Georgia in Atlanta, Georgia (United States).

== Pool A ==
=== Argentina ===
- Fernando Borrero
- Jorge Elgueta
- Sebastián Firpo
- Sebastián Jabif
- Leonardo Maly
- Guillermo Martínez
- Marcos Milinkovic
- Pablo Pereira
- Guillermo Quaini
- Eduardo Rodríguez
- Alejandro Romano
- Javier Weber (c)
- Head coach:
  Daniel Castellani

=== Brazil ===
- Gilson Bernardo
- Nalbert Bitencourt
- Giovane Gávio
- Antonio Carlos Gouveia
- Mauricio Lima
- Fábio Marcelino
- Marcelo Negrão
- Cássio Pereira
- Max Pereira
- Alexandre Samuel
- Carlos Schwanke
- Paulo André Silva
- Head coach:
  José Roberto Guimarães

=== Bulgaria ===
- Lubomir Ganev
- Ivaylo Gavrilov
- Plamen Hristov
- Evgeni Ivanov
- Nikolay Ivanov
- Plamen Konstantinov
- Lyudmil Naydenov
- Nayden Naydenov
- Petar Ouzounov
- Martin Stoev
- Dimo Tonev (c)
- Nikolay Jeliazkov
- Head coach:
  Bogdan Kjutchoukov

=== Cuba ===
- Alexis Batle
- Angel Beltrán
- Fredy Brooks
- Joel Despaigne
- Raúl Diago
- Jhosvany Hernández
- Osvaldo Hernández
- Lázaro Marín
- Alain Roca
- Rodolfo Sanchez
- Ricardo Vantes
- Nicolas Vives
- Head coach:
  Juan Díaz Marino

=== Poland ===
- Damian Dacewicz
- Piotr Gruszka
- Krzysztof Janczak
- Marcin Nowak
- Robert Prygiel
- Witold Roman (c)
- Krzysztof Śmigiel
- Andrzej Stelmach
- Krzysztof Stelmach
- Mariusz Szyszko
- Leszek Urbanowicz
- Paweł Zagumny
- Head coach:
  Wiktor Krebok

=== United States ===
- Lloy Ball
- Bob Ctvrtlik
- Scott Fortune
- John Hyden
- Bryan Ivie
- Michael Lambert
- Dan Landry
- Jeff Nygaard
- Tom Sorensen
- Jeff Stork
- Ethan Watts
- Brett Winslow
- Head coach:
  Fred Strum

== Pool B ==
=== Italy ===
- Lorenzo Bernardi
- Vigor Bovolenta
- Marco Bracci
- Luca Cantagalli
- Andrea Gardini
- Andrea Giani
- Pasquale Gravina
- Marco Meoni
- Samuele Papi
- Andrea Sartoretti
- Paolo Tofoli
- Andrea Zorzi
- Head coach:
  Julio Velasco

=== Netherlands ===
- Peter Blangé
- Bas van de Goor
- Mike van de Goor
- Rob Grabert
- Henk-Jan Held
- Guido Görtzen
- Misha Latuhihin
- Olof van der Meulen
- Jan Posthuma
- Brecht Rodenburg
- Richard Schuil
- Ronald Zwerver
- Head coach:
  Joop Alberda

=== Russia ===
- Oleg Chatounov
- Pavel Chichkin
- Igor Chulepov
- Stanislav Dineikine
- Dmitry Fomin
- Valery Goryuchev
- Alexey Kazakov
- Vadim Khamuttskikh
- Ruslan Olikhver
- Sergey Orlenko
- Konstantin Ushakov
- Serguei Tetioukine
- Head coach:
  Vyatcheslav Platonov

=== South Korea ===
- Bang Sin-Bong
- Shin Young-Chul
- Choi Cheon-Sik
- Ha Jong-Hwa
- Im Do-Hun
- Kim Sang-Woo
- Kim Se-Jin
- Lee Sung-Hee
- Park Hee-Sang
- Park Seon-chul
- Sin Jin-sik
- Sin Jeong-seop
- Head coach:
  Song Man-Duck

=== Tunisia ===
- Tarek Aouni
- Mohamed Baghdadi
- Khaled Belaïd
- Faycal Ben Amara
- Hichem Ben Romdhane
- Riadh Ghandri
- Noureddine Hfaiedh
- Ghazi Koubba
- Atif Loukil
- Riadh Hedhili
- Ghazi Guidara
- Majdi Toumi
- Head coach:
  Fathi M'Kaouar

=== FR Yugoslavia ===
- Vladimir Batez
- Dejan Brđović (c)
- Đorđe Đurić
- Andrija Gerić
- Nikola Grbić
- Vladimir Grbić
- Rajko Jokanović
- Slobodan Kovač
- Đula Mešter
- Željko Tanasković
- Žarko Petrović
- Goran Vujević
- Head coach:
  Zoran Gajić
