= 1998 FIVB Men's Volleyball World Championship squads =

This article shows the rosters of all participating teams at the 1998 FIVB Men's Volleyball World Championship in Japan.

== Italy ==
#	Name	Date of birth	Height	Weight	Spike	Block
1	Andrea Gardini
2	Marco Meoni
3	Pasquale Gravina
4	Ferdinando De Giorgi
5	Alessandro Fei
6	Samuele Papi
7	Andrea Sartoretti
8	Marco Bracci
10	Simone Rosalba
12	Mirko Corsano
13	Andrea Giani
15	Michele Pasinato

- Coach: Bebeto de Freitas

== Russia ==
#	Name	Date of birth	Height	Weight	Spike	Block
1	Stanislav Dineikine
2	Vadim Khamoutskikh
4	Rouslan Olikhver
6	Igor Choulepov
7	Alexei Kazakov
8	Dmitri Fomine
9	Serguei Tetiukhine
10	Roman Iakovlev
11	Konstantin Ushakov
14	Dimitri Jeltoukha
17	Alexandre Berezine
18	Andrei Voronkov

- Coach: Guennadi Chipouline

== United States ==
#	Name	Date of birth	Height	Weight	Spike	Block
1	Lloy Ball
2	Greg Romano
3	Mike Lambert
4	Phillip Eatherton
5	Erik Sullivan
6	Tom Sorensenen
10	Chip McCaw
11	Chris Harger
12	Tom Hoff
13	Jeff Nygaard
14	Kevin Barnett
16	Dan Landry

- Coach: Doug Beal

== South Korea ==
#	Name	Date of birth	Height	Weight	Spike	Block
1	Shin Jin-Sik
2	Choi Tae-Woong
3	Kim Se-Jin
4	Lee Ho
6	Bang Ji-Sub
7	Kim Sang-Woo
11	Lee Kyung-Soo
12	Park Hee-Sang
14	Park Sun-Chool
15	Kim Sung-Chae
17	Han Hee-Suk
18	Chang Byung-Chul

- Coach: Jin Jun-Taik

== Poland ==
#	Name	Date of birth	Height	Weight	Spike	Block
1	Krzysztof Ignaczak
2	Andrzej Stelmach
3	Damian Dacewicz
4	Marcin Nowak
5	Piotr Gruszka
7	Michal Chadala
8	Dawid Murek
10	Pawel Papke
11	Marcin Prus
13	Sebastian Swiderski
14	Pawel Zagumny
16	Adam Nowik

- Coach: Mazur Ireneusz

== Algeria ==
#	Name	Date of birth	Height	Weight	Spike	Block
1	Adel Chabi
2	Fethi Berrairia
3	Lies Tizi Oualou
6	Hamida Faycal Bencharif
7	Nassim Hedroug
9	Samir Ferad
10	Billel Medah
12	Mohamed Adel Sennoun
13	Faycal Gharzouli
14	Hichem Guemmadi
15	Farid Oukali
18	Oualid Guemmadi

- Coach: Mohand Said Kaci

== Yugoslavia ==
#	Name	Date of birth	Height	Weight	Spike	Block
1	Djordje Djuric
3	Vladimir Batez
4	Zeljko Tanaskovic
6	Slobodan Boskan
7	Dula Mester
9	Nikola Grbic
10	Vladimir Grbic
12	Andrija Geric
13	Goran Vujevic
14	Ivan Miljkovic
15	Veljko Petkovic
18	Igor Vusurovic

- Coach: Zoran Gajic

== Netherlands ==
#	Name	Date of birth	Height	Weight	Spike	Block
1	Misha Latuhinin
2	Frank Denkers
3	Sander Olsthoorn
4	Reinder Nummerdor
5	Guido Gortzen
6	Richard Schuil
7	Mike van de Goor
9	Bas van de Goor
10	Mark Broere
14	Marko Klok
15	Albert Cristina
16	Justin Sombroek

- Coach: Toon Gerbrands

== Ukraine ==
#	Name	Date of birth	Height	Weight	Spike	Block
2	Igor Popov
4	Volodymyr Hudima
5	Sergiy Peresunchak
6	Andriy Sydorenko
7	Yuriy Filippov
8	Igor Zaytsev
9	Oleksiy Gatin
10	Oleg Mushenko
11	Serhiy Shchvinskyy
12	Oleksandr Shadchin
13	Viktor Loshakov
14	Volodymyr Zhula

- Coach: Leonid Likhno

== Greece ==
#	Name	Date of birth	Height	Weight	Spike	Block
1	Konstantinos Christofidelis
2	Marios Giourdas
3	Theodoros Chatziantoniou
5	Ilias Grammatikopoulos
6	Vasileios Kournetas
9	Konstantinos Angelidis
10	Antonios Tsakiropoulos
13	Michail Christoforidis
14	Athanasios Michalopoulos
15	Theodoros Bozidis
16	Antonios Kovatsef
17	Vasileios Mitroudis

- Coach: Stellios Kazazis

== Australia ==
#	Name	Date of birth	Height	Weight	Spike	Block
1	Daniel Howard
3	Nicholas Mortimer
4	Benjamin Hardy
6	Nathan Jakavicius
7	David Waite
8	Russel Wentworth
9	Daniel Ronan
10	Spiros Marazios
11	Scott Newcomb
12	David Beard
15	Hidde van Beest
16	Gaberiel Mauerhofer

- Coach: Stelio de Recco

== Czech Republic ==
#	Name	Date of birth	Height	Weight	Spike	Block
1	Martin Hroch
2	Pavel Ceznícek
4	Milan Hadrava
5	Ludek Cernoušek
6	Petr Karabec
7	Milan Bican
9	Stanislav Pochop
10	Jirí Novák
11	Petr Konecný
12	Petr Galis
13	Petr Pešl
16	Přemysl Kubala

- Coach: Miroslav Nekola

== Cuba ==
#	Name	Date of birth	Height	Weight	Spike	Block
3	Rodolfo Sanchez Sanchez
5	Alexis Argilagos Segura
7	Angel Dennis Diaz
8	Pavel Pimenta Allen
9	Raúl Diago Izquierdo
10	Tomas Aldazabal Manzano
11	Osbaldo Hernández Chambell
12	Ramon Gato Moya
13	Alain Roca Borrero
14	Ihosvany Hernández Rivera
16	Yosenki Garcia Diaz
18	Gilman Cao Herrera

- Coach: Juan Diaz Marino

== Bulgaria ==
#	Name	Date of birth	Height	Weight	Spike	Block
1	Evgeni Ivanov
2	Lyudmil Naydenov
4	Martin Stoev
6	Ivaylo Stefanov
7	Nikolay Jeliazkov
8	Hristo Tsvetanov
9	Vesselin Dimchev
10	Petar Uzunov
12	Nikolay Ivanov
13	Ivaylo Gavrilov
15	Krassimir Stefanov
17	Plamen Konstantinov

- Coach: Gueorgui Vasilev

== Argentina ==
#	Name	Date of birth	Height	Weight	Spike	Block
1	Marcos Milinkovic
2	Jorge Elgueta
4	Alejandro Spajic
5	Guillermo Quaini
6	Javier Weber
7	Fernando Borrero
9	Oscar Vizzari
12	Juan Carlos Cuminetti
14	Sebastián Firpo
15	Pablo Pereira
17	Marcelo Román
18	Juan Pablo Porello

- Coach: Daniel Castellani

== China ==
#	Name	Date of birth	Height	Weight	Spike	Block
3	Liang Zheng
5	Qi Chen
6	Weizhong Lu
7	Liming Zhang
8	Jianan Zhou
9	Fang Chen
11	Hebing Wang
12	Xiang Zhang
13	Yong Zhao
14	An Jiajie
16	Gang Zhu
18	Tieming Li

- Coach: Jiawei Wang

== Egypt ==
#	Name	Date of birth	Height	Weight	Spike	Block
1	Hamdi Awad
2	Ashraf Abou Elhassan
3	Ahmed Alhefnawy
4	Nehad Shehata
6	Mohamed Abdelrahman
7	Maged Mostafa
11	Mohamed Ibrahim
12	Ibrahim Rashwan
15	Mahmoud Elkify
16	Ibrahim Youssef
17	Ayman Alnekery
18	Mahmoud Gomaa

- Coach: Ibrahim Fakhreldin

== Iran ==
#	Name	Date of birth	Height	Weight	Spike	Block
1	Mohammad Hossein Nejati
2	Ali Naghdi
3	Saeid Rezaei
5	Peyman Akbari
6	Mohammad Omdeh-Ghiasi
7	Amir Hossein Monazzami
10	Behnam Mahmoudi
13	Hossein Maadani
15	Ahmad Masajedi
16	Firouz Tabeshnejad
17	Mohammad Torkashvand

- Coach: Fumihiko Matsumoto

== Brazil ==
#	Name	Date of birth	Height	Weight	Spike	Block
2	Ricardo Micieli
3	Andre Heller
4	Kid
6	Mauricio
7	Giba
8	Douglas
9	Joel dos Santos
10	Max
12	Nalbert (C)
13	Gustavo
14	Alex Lenz
17	Ricardo

- Coach: Radames Lattari Filho

== Spain ==
#	Name	Date of birth	Height	Weight	Spike	Block
1	Rafael Pascual
3	Venancio Costa
6	Juan Carlos Vega
7	Miguel Angel Falasca
8	Juan Carlos Robles
9	Juan Colom
10	Cosme Prenafeta
11	Carlos Carreno
13	Jesus Garrido
14	Jose Luis Molto
15	Ernesto Rodriguez
17	Enrique de la Fuente

- Coach: Vincenzo Di Pinto

== Canada ==
#	Name	Date of birth	Height	Weight	Spike	Block
2	Andrew Zurawsky
3	Keith Sanheim
4	Kent Greves
7	Paul Duerden
8	Scott Koskie
9	Junior Donald
11	Jeff Chung
12	Ross Ballard
14	Murray Grapentine
15	Jason Haldane
16	Terry Martin
17	David Kantor

- Coach: Garth Pischke

== Japan ==
#	Name	Date of birth	Height	Weight	Spike	Block
1	Takashi Narita
2	Yoichi Kato
3	Yuichi Nakagaichi
5	Masayoshi Manabe
6	Koichi Nishimura
7	Kentaro Asahi
8	Masaji Ogino
9	Nobutaka Hirano
10	Katsuyuki Minami
13	Minoru Takeuchi
14	Hideyuki Otake
16	Norihiko Miyazaki

- Coach: Futoshi Teramawari

== Turkey ==
#	Name	Date of birth	Height	Weight	Spike	Block
1	Cengizhan Kartaltepe
2	Kenan Bengu
3	Mehmet Yilmaz
4	Mehmet Sahin
6	Baris Ozdemir
7	Gursel Yesiltas
8	Hakan Akisik
9	Ufuk Fuat Bileke
10	Gokhan Oner
11	Aykut Lale
14	Osman Babagiray
15	Hakan Fertelli

- Coach: Gilberto Herrera

== Thailand ==
#	Name	Date of birth	Height	Weight	Spike	Block
1	Lawrach Tontongkum
2	Yutthapol Jarhenrut
3	Terdsak Sungworakan
4	Anusorn Charunsiriwongtana
5	Panya Makhumleg
6	Attsphon Khemdaeng
9	Aphisak Rakchartyingcheep
10	Yuttana Kiewpekar
11	Yuttachai Ratanawongpak
12	Waroot Wisadsing
16	Khomkroch Phayooncharn
17	Supachai Jitjumroon

- Coach: Kun Xing Wu
