= Alessandro Romano =

Alessandro Romano may refer to:

- Alessandro Romano (composer) (1533–1592), Italian composer, violist, singer, and monk
- Alessandro Romano (footballer, born 1969), Italian football defender
- Alessandro Romano (footballer, born 2006), Swiss football midfielder for Roma
- Alessandro Romano (1924–1994), 14th Prince of Leonforte

== See also ==
- Alejandro Romano (disambiguation)
