= Ivan Tasev =

Ivan Tasev may refer to:

- Ivan Tasev (volleyball), Bulgarian volleyball player
- Ivan Tasev (footballer), Bulgarian footballer
