= Schwanke =

Schwanke is a German surname. Notable people with the surname include:

- Carlos Schwanke (born 1974), Brazilian volleyball player
- Jörg Schwanke (born 1969), German football player and coach
- Rebecca Schwanke, American politician from Alaska
