= David Beard =

David Beard may refer to:

- David Beard (volleyball) (born 1973), Australian volleyball player
- David Beard (Canadian football) (born 1993), Canadian football offensive lineman
