= Ethan Watts =

American volleyball player (born 1972)

Personal information
- Born: Ethan Mahoney Watts; May 4, 1972 (age 54); Philadelphia, Pennsylvania, U.S.
- Height: 6 ft 7 in (201 cm)
- Weight: 205 lb (93 kg)
- Education: Brigham Young University

Volleyball information
- Position: Middle blocker
- Number: 15

National team
1994–1997	United States
Medal record
Men's volleyball
Representing United States
World Championship
Bronze medal – third place	1994 Greece	Team
Pan American Games
Silver medal – second place	1995 Mar del Plata	Team

Ethan Mahoney Watts (born May 4, 1972) is an American former volleyball player. He was a member of the United States men's national volleyball team at the 1996 Summer Olympics in Atlanta.

Watts competed at the 1993 World University Games in Buffalo as a middle blocker, and was a member of the team that won the bronze medal at the 1994 FIVB World Championship in Greece.

== College ==
Watts played volleyball for Brigham Young University and was a three-time All-American. In 1994, Watts' senior year, he led BYU to a 21–6 record and a number two national ranking. In 2006, Watts was inducted into the BYU Athletic Hall of Fame.

== Club volleyball ==
After playing for the U.S. national team, Watts played volleyball professionally in Italy for teams in Modena, Latina, and Milan.

== Personal life ==
Watts graduated from BYU with a degree in psychology, and later graduated from the University of San Diego with a JD and MBA.

Watts currently resides in San Diego, California with his wife, Manuela, where Watts practices law as a business law, IP law, and real estate law attorney.
