= Alejandro Romano =

Alejandro Romano may refer to:

- Alejandro Romano (missionary) (1664–1724), a Jesuit missionary to New Spain
- Alejandro Romano (volleyball) (b. 1974), an Argentine volleyball player
