= Cássio Pereira =

Brazilian volleyball player (born 1971)

Personal information
- Full name: Cássio Leandro das Neves Pereira
- Born: 7 December 1971 (age 54); Rio de Janeiro, Brazil
- Height: 1.87 m (6 ft 2 in)

Volleyball information
- Position: Setter

National team
1993–1998	Brazil
Honours
Men's volleyball
Representing Brazil
World Grand Champions Cup
Gold medal – first place	1997 Japan	Team
World League
Gold medal – first place	1993 São Paulo
Silver medal – second place	1995 Rio de Janeiro
Bronze medal – third place	1994 Milan
South American Championship
Gold medal – first place	1995 Brazil

Cássio Pereira (born 7 December 1971) is a Brazilian volleyball player. He competed in the men's tournament at the 1996 Summer Olympics.
