= Fábio Marcelino =

Brazilian volleyball player (1973–2025)

Personal information
- Full name: Fábio Paranhos Marcelino
- Born: 11 March 1973; São Paulo, Brazil
- Died: 2 April 2025 (aged 52)
- Height: 1.95 cm (1 in)

Volleyball information
- Position: Outside spiker / Opposite spiker

National team
1994–1996	Brazil
Honours
Men's volleyball
Representing Brazil
World League
Silver medal – second place	1995 Rio de Janeiro
Bronze medal – third place	1994 Milan
South American Championship
Gold medal – first place	1995 Brazil

Fábio Marcelino (11 March 1973 – 2 April 2025) was a Brazilian volleyball player. He competed in the men's tournament at the 1996 Summer Olympics. Marcelino died on 2 April 2025, at the age of 52.
