= Chip McCaw =

American volleyball player (born 1973)

Personal information
- Full name: Christian Eric McCaw
- Nickname: Chip
- Born: March 24, 1973 (age 53); Tulsa, Oklahoma, U.S.
- Height: 6 ft 4 in (193 cm)
- Education: Pepperdine University

Volleyball information
- Position: Setter
- Number: 7 (1996); 10 (2000)

National team
1995–2000	United States

Christian Eric McCaw (born March 24, 1973) is an American former Olympic volleyball player. He represented the United States at the 2000 Summer Olympics in Sydney, Australia. He was a setter.

== College ==
McCaw played volleyball at Pepperdine University. He helped the Waves win the NCAA National Championship in 1992, and was selected to the All-Tournament Team. He was teammates at Pepperdine with future Olympian Tom Sorensen.

== Beach volleyball ==
From 2001 to 2007, McCaw played in 55 beach volleyball tournaments and won $31,000 in prizes. He played 14 tournaments with John Hyden as his partner.

== Personal life ==
McCaw was married to model Amber Valletta, and together they have a son who was born in 2000.
