= Yoichi Kato =

Japanese volleyball player (born 1976)

Yoichi Kato (加藤 陽一, Katō Yōichi, born August 12, 1976 in Ōita) is a former volleyball player from Japan, who was one of the leading players in the Men's National Team in the early 2000s. He played as a wing-spiker. In 2003 he completed his first season for Sisley Treviso, who reached the final of the Italian League.

== Honours ==
- 1998 World Championship — 16th place
- 1999 FIVB World Cup — 10th place
- 2001 FIVB World League — 9th place
- 2001 World Grand Champions Cup — 5th place
- 2002 FIVB World League — 13th place
- 2002 World Championship — 9th place
- 2003 FIVB World League — 13th place
- 2003 FIVB World Cup — 9th place
