= Pavel Shishkin =

Russian businessman

Personal information
- Nickname: Russian Terminator
- Nationality: Soviet Union → Russia
- Born: 17 April 1970 (age 56) Moscow
- Height: 200 cm (6 ft 7 in)

Volleyball information
- Position: outside hitter
Honours
Representing Russia
Men's volleyball
World Championship
| Bronze medal – third place | 1993 Men's European Volleyball Championship |
| Gold medal – first place | 1991 FIVB Volleyball Men's World Cup |
| Silver medal – second place | 1993 FIVB Volleyball World League |
| Bronze medal – third place | 1996 FIVB Volleyball World League |
- Updated on 26 May 2016

Pavel Vladimirovich Shishkin (born 11 April 1970) is a Russian businessman, philanthropist and former professional volleyball player.

Shishkin was a Master of sports of international grade who played for the national teams of the USSR, Unified Team and Russia from 1991 to 1997. Known as one of the most skillful hitters, he managed to win various international competitions and take part in 1992 Summer Olympics and 1996 Summer Olympics.

From 2002 Shishkin is an owner and CEO of holding company Tactics Group, leading investment, redevelopment and construction business projects in Moscow. His other enterprises include a canteen and catering chain ‘Smart Food’ and ‘Hair Shop’ brand, specialized in hair extensions industry with its own production, multiple salons, retail shops.

Founder of the charity fund “Detskiy dom” (lit. ‘House of children’).

== Biography ==
=== Early years ===
Pavel Shishkin was born in Moscow to a couple of scientists. Together with his sibling Julia he underwent training in specialized sports school No. 111 at Zelenograd, coached by Venera Jakubova.

As Shishkin himself recalls, he dreamed of being a professional volleyball player since childhood: as early as at the seventh grade of school he bet with his classmates that once he would become a member of a national squad. Him being significantly shorter than his peers threatened to ruin all the hopes for sports career, nevertheless Shishkin was determined to overcome this obstacle: he studied multiple medicine volumes and developed a personal ‘growth system’:

I tilted my bed at an angle of 45°....Tied the legs down and slept headfirst. My sleeping place became something between torture rack and Ilizarov apparatus. I tried to lengthen my spine in any possible way. When riding in the trolley bus — drew myself up to the hand-rail. Maybe that all was merely a delusion, but I was 165 cm tall and then reached 200.

— Pavel Shishkin, interview for Sport-Express newspaper, 30 June 2010

=== Education ===
Upon graduation from sports school, Pavel Shishkin gained a diploma at Smolensk State State Academy of Physical Education, Tourism and Culture. After leaving professional volleyball, he got an MBA degree in Grenoble. Later, in 2008 he also got a DBA degree at RANEPA.

=== Professional sports ===
Shishkin got his first international gold medal at U21 World Cup in 1989, still being a student of Olympic Reserve sports school. A year earlier he made his professional debut in Iskra Odintsovo. At 1990 Shishkin became of 24 members of the USSR men's national volleyball team, the next year joining the core 12. In 1991 Shishkin transferred to CSKA Moscow. Playing for the USSR national squad he won World Cup 1991, in 1992 he competed at World League tournament and the 1992 Summer Olympics in Barcelona.

In the season Shishkin 1992–93 made his debut at the Italian Volleyball League for Zinella Volley Bologna, playing for this team he spent two consecutive seasons in top Serie А1. For his forceful spikes nicknamed Shishkin “Terminator Russo’ (“The Russian Terminator’). ‘Sportpress Italia’ praised him as one of the strongest mercenaries of 1990th, ranking 6 among 30 outstanding volleyball players of the decade.

In 1995 together with a partner from national squad Ruslan Olikhver, Shishkin was invited into brazilian club ‘Report’ Suzano. Both sportsmen recall the training schedule to be rigorous, while psychological climate — arduous. At the time Shishkin faced serious health issues: due to circulatory disturbance his right hand went numb. “It [the hand] turned black, then pale. And completely cold. The disease progressed <…> With any load bloodflow simply stopped.” According to Shishkin, when Viacheslav Platonov called him up to a national team before the 1996 Summer Olympics, the doctors prohibited any training loads and suggested vein replacement surgery. The first couple of matches he was watching the game from the bench, but still fielded when the situation got critical. Only later the disease was cured by the means of alternative medicine.

Playing for the international clubs, Shishkin remained active in the national team and competed in all World League tournaments in seasons 1996–93, missing only World Championship 1994.

I’ve caught the time when volleyball matches lasted three hours and more, like in golf. I played for USSR, for CIS (at the 1992 Olympics in Barcelona) and for Russia. Only at the very end of my career the rules were changed and the games grew shorter. Before those alterations a game could rarely last less than an hour, it could happen only if the opponent turned out to be really weak. But usually a match would last at least a couple of hours.

— Pavel Shishkin, 2017

Shishkin represented Russia at 1996 Summer Olympics in Atlanta as a member of the first-team squad, still Russia lost to Cuba in the quarter-finals. For his impressive performance Shishkin was called the strongest player of that match and one of only two “players, whom Platonov observed approvingly”. Later in 1996, Shishkin was offered a contract with JT Thunders Hiroshima with annual salary as much as $300.000. Replacing another Russian player Evgeni Mitkov, Shishkin stayed in Japan for full 3 seasons. Season 1996-97 was remarkably successful for JT Thunders: the club won silver medal in nationals, while Shishkin was honored with special titles of best spiker, best back court spiker, best server. He was also ranked one of six leading players of the tournament.

In 1997 after 85 matches Shishkin left the national team, finishing with European Volleyball Championship. Volleyball Federation of Russia named him the 16th of best players between years 1993–2014, scoring 430 points and 708 winning serves.

In season 1999-2000 Shishkin transferred to Italy again, this time joining Quattro Torri Ferrara, that turned out to be the last club in his professional sports career.

=== Entrepreneurship ===
External image
- Pavel Shishkin in shortlist of RBK TV 2017 nominees for “Investor of the Year”

Business newspapers Kommersant и Forbes name Shishkin one of the most successful entrepreneurs among retired Russian sportsmen.

Still being a professional sportsman, Shishkin started his first business endeavour: a restaurant named ‘Shishka’ on Moscow's Petrovka Street, following with one more on the Dolgorukovskaya st. In an interview for RBK Daily Shishkin recalls closing the restaurant's first thing upon receiving the MBA, because they needed significant investments with relatively low income.

His first significant asset became real estate company ‘Tactics Group’ (TC), purchased in 2002. Founded in 1993, the enterprise was licensed for conducting open biddings for municipal property sales and land leasing in Moscow. One of the first deals closed by Tactics Group was an acquisition of the mansions, previously rented for Shishkin's restaurants. Consecutively the TC's portfolio included large construction project as Vivaldi Plaza business centre and Marriott-Paveletsky hotel building

In 2002 Shishkin invested $100.000 in his elder sister's project: ‘Hair Shop’ company, an importer of hair extensions and supplies. Over the subsequent decade the venture grew into a massive retail chain with own production and numerous points-of-sale in different regions within the state. By 2014 its annual turnover nearly reached 1.000.000 roubles.

In 2012 году Shishkin co-founded Smart Foods, a HoReCa joint venture targeting the office workers. The first canteen of the future chain was opened in Tactics Group's Vivaldi Plaza, soon followed by the second place in ‘Preo8’ business centre at the Preobrazhenskaya square. An old friend of Shishkin's, a well-known Russian musician Alexey Kortnev partnered in this enterprise.

Even more ambitious project has lately been added to the Tactics Group portfolio: the Bolshevik's (a former confectionery in Moscow) redevelopment in partnership with O1 Properties, previously owned by Boris Mints. In 2012 two companies jointly acquired 4.5 ha of former industrial land, with the transaction amoun about $73 million, $45 million accounted for Tactics Group. The original projects implied no new construction, only repairs and reconstruction of the historical buildings. The partners planned to redevelop the site into a multifunctional complex with a modern arts museum, office and residential premises, a park, and public spaces. According to Shishkin, the key purpose of the project was, first of all, to open formerly closed area to all citizen, and secondly — to create an influential zone of attraction, a place of interest on the city's map. Only the landscaping and infrastructure development were budgeted for $10 million.

Designed by John McAslan + Partners, the restoration works on buildings 1, 2 and 3 were coordinated by the Department for Cultural Heritage of Moscow. The first stage of redevelopment and business centre construction was completed in 2016. The Museum of Russian impressionism was opened later the same year.

The Moscow Urban Forum held in 2017 honored the Bolshevik's redevelopment project with the special prize as the most successful case of renovation by means of private investors. More than 54% of Muscovites ranked it with the highest scores in the survey at the “Active Citizen” initiative.

Upon completion of the works, O1 Properties proposed to partly alter the initial project, constructing new apartment buildings. In 2017 after series of negotiations Tactics Group sold its share to the former partner and withdrew from the project.

In 2014 the market value of the Tactics Group assets estimated $100 million, reaching about $180 million by 2017. In 2017 Pavel Shishkin was nominated for RBK premium ‘Investor of the Year’ as one of the entrepreneurs with the highest annual revenue growth.

=== Social Activity ===
External images
- Opening Ceremony of VII Children Olympics
- Olympic flames at the ceremony

In 1998 Pavel Shishkin established charity fund “Detskiy dom” (lit. “House of Children”), taking under its care a boarding school in Vyshny Volochyok. Gradually the range of supported orphanages grew to almost twenty. “Detskiy dom” is focused upon long-term projects aiming to help in socialization, education and full-scale development of children, employment assistance for the graduates. One of the foundation's key priorities is the development of small family-type groups for no more than ten children, where life and education processes are similar to regular families. Also ‘Detskiy Dom’ sponsors multiple educational initiatives, arranges vacations and tourist trips for orphan children, publishes ‘Deti Kak Deti’ (lit. ‘Kids as Kids’) magazine.

In 2004 “Detskiy Dom” started a biennial Russian Olympic Games for orphans and boarding schools students. The rules and criteria of the tournament are fully congruent to the international Olympics, team and personal competitions are held in swimming, tennis, athletics, and more. Apart from sports, the event includes creative master-classes, art exhibitions and KVN shows. Famous sportsmen, celebrities, singers and bands take part in the events, and the authentic Olympic Flame is used at the opening ceremony. Lately the International Olympic Committee and the Russian Ministry of Sports came in on aiding the organisers. In 2019 the IX Children Olympics for Orphans and Boarding School Students hosted 24 teams and 432 sportsmen.

=== Personal life ===
External images
- Pavel with his wife Natalya at the “Hole in One” golf tournament
- With friends at charity tournament “Agalarov”, right to left: Pavel Shishkinn, Kamil Larin, Alexey Kortnev

Pavel Shishkin is married to an actress Natalya Shishkina, has 5 children.

Back in 1996, still being a member of JT Thunders, Shishkin started playing golf. Shishkin resumed training only in 2010, by 2016 he reached handicapping 9,5 and triumphed at numerous tournaments. Both he and his wife are members of the Skolkovo club.

Retiring from the professional sport, Shishkin immersed into studying the history of religion, started meditating, made multiple pilgrimages, met such orthodox religious leaders as hieromonk Makariy (Makienko) at Saint Panteleimon Monastery, hegumen Joseph (Krjukov) at Optina Monastery, Indian guru Sathya Sai Baba, Tibetan Buddhist leaders Chökyi Nyima Rinpoche and Trulshik Rinpoche. Later in numerous interviews Shishkin confessed, that those encounters significantly influenced his life.

== Honors, awards, and achievements ==
- Junior World champion 1989;
- World Cup 1991 winner;
- bronze medalist at European Championship 1993;
- silver (1993) and bronze (1996) World League medallist;
- silver medallist of Spartakiad of Peoples of the USSR 1991;
- silver medallist of Brazilian Superliga 1995–96;
- bronze medallist of Japan National Volleyball Championship 1996–97.

== Works cited ==
- Sviridov, V. L. (2016). Волейбол, энциклопедия [Volleyball, Encyclopaedia] (in Russian). Sport. p. 567. ISBN 978-5-906131-79-9.
- Большая олимпийская энциклопедия [The Great Olympic Encyclopedia] (in Russian). Vol. 2. Moscow: Olympia Press. 2006. p. 330. ISBN 5-94299-089-1.
- Malolepszy, T. (2013). European Volleyball Championship Results: Since 1948. Scarecrow Press. ISBN 978-0-8108-8786-2.
- Stetzko, V.; Trisvyatskiy, I. (2008). Волейбольный гид 2008-09 [Volleyball Guide 2008-09] (in Russian). Moscow. pp. 180–184.
- Rossoshik, L. V. (2017). Праздник, который всегда со мной [A Holiday, That's Always With Me] (in Russian). Moscow: “Sport”. p. 265. ISBN 978-5-906839-64-0.
- Rossoshik, L. V. (2000). "Российский легион в Италии" [Russian Legion in Italy]. Sport-Express (in Russian). No. 5. pp. 100–106.
- "Non basta Dall'Olio per vincere in trasfera" (PDF). l'Unità (in Italian). No. 38. October 1993. p. 26.
