= Lee Sung-hee =

South Korean volleyball player (born 1967)

Personal information
- Nationality: South Korean
- Born: 26 September 1967 (age 58)

Sport
- Sport: Volleyball

Lee Sung-hee (born 26 September 1967) is a South Korean volleyball player. He competed at the 1988 Summer Olympics and the 1996 Summer Olympics.
