= Jesús Garrido =

Spanish volleyball player (born 1970)

Personal information
- Full name: Jesús Garrido
- Nationality: Spanish
- Born: January 30, 1970 (age 56) Madrid, Spain

Jesús Garrido Escobar (born 30 January 1970) is a Spanish former volleyball player who competed in the 1992 Summer Olympics. He was one of the Spanish best volleyball players during the 90s.He was 250 times international with the Spanish National Team and is an Olympic Diploma in the Barcelona 92 Olympic Games. Also with the Spanish National Team he won a bronze medal in the Mediterranean Games of Athens 91 and Silver in those of France 93. In turn, he has played in several editions of the World League .In 1995 he was elected Best Player of the European Cup Winners' Cup. With the Group Duero San José of Soria, he won two Spanish League titles, a King's Cup, Super Cup, Runner-up of the European Cup Winners' Cup and then played three seasons in the powerful Lega Pallavolo Serie A in Italy.

He was President of the Volleyball Madrid Federation. He has commentated on and narrated hundreds of volleyball matches on several television channels.

He has also been Head of Education and Research Department at Spanish Antidoping Agency. He currently works as Operational Manager of Sports Centers at Madrid City Council and like Board Manager at Decision Support Consulting Llc.
