= Scott Newcomb =

Australian volleyball player (born 1973)

Personal information
- Nationality: Australian
- Born: 27 September 1973 (age 53); Perth, Australia
- Hometown: Brisbane
- Height: 188 cm (6 ft 2 in)
- Weight: 86 kg (190 lb)

Volleyball information
- Position: setter

National team
1992–2000	Australia

Scott Newcomb (born 27 September 1973) is a former Australian male volleyball player.

Scott was part of the Australia men's national volleyball team. He competed with the Australian Team at the 2000 Summer Olympics in Sydney, Australia, finishing 8th.

He was also in the Australian teams that competed in World League-1999, World Championships-1998, Grand Champions Cup-1997, World Student Games-1995 and Asian Championships-1993, 1995, 1997 and 1999, in which the team won the bronze medal at the 1997 and the silver medal at the 1999 Asian Volleyball Championships and Scott finished as the best ranked setter at the 1997 championships and 2nd ranked setter at the 1999 championships.

Scott played 290 International games for Australia, he also captained the team against Slovakia in Canberra in 1999 and was vice captain between 1998 and 2000. Scott played professional Volleyball in Germany for Duren (team captain) in the Bundesliga (1996–1998). He also played in Holland for Ominworld (team captain) in the Eredivisie (1998–2002) where he was the first Australian to win a domestic European Championship.

Scott was named Australian Volleyball Player of the year in 1996 and came 2nd in this in 1997, 1999 and 2000. He was also Queensland Volleyball player of the year in 1994, 1995 and 1998. Scott was named Queensland Male Volleyball player of the Decade (1990–1999) and named in the Queensland Team of the last 50 years (1969–2019), alongside his father John Newcomb. They were the first father and son to represent Australia in Volleyball and are the only father and son to Captain Australia in Volleyball. Scott has also coached junior club teams in Holland and Germany, Queensland Junior teams and at the Queensland Academy of Sport.
