= Brett Winslow =

American volleyball player (born 1967)

Personal information
- Born: September 8, 1967 (age 59); Santa Barbara, California, U.S.
- Height: 6 ft 5 in (1.95 m)
- Education: California State University, Long Beach

Volleyball information
- Position: Middle blocker
- Number: 17 (national team); 15 (Long Beach State University)

National team
1991, 1993–1996	United States
Medal record
Men's volleyball
Representing United States
World Championship
Bronze medal – third place	1994 Greece	Team

Brett Winslow (born September 8, 1967) is an American former volleyball player who was a member of the United States men's national volleyball team that finished in ninth place at the 1996 Summer Olympics in Atlanta.

== College ==
Winslow played volleyball at Long Beach State University and won the 1991 NCAA Championship as the team captain. He also was an All-American in his last two years at Long Beach State.

Winslow was inducted into the Long Beach State Hall of Fame in 1997. His number 15 jersey was retired on March 15, 2014.

== Awards ==
- Two-time All-American
- NCAA Champion — 1991
- FIVB World Championship bronze medal — 1994
- Long Beach State Hall of Fame — 1997
- Long Beach State jersey retired — 2014
