= Yong Zhao =

American educator

Academic background
- Education: Sichuan University; University of Illinois at Urbana–Champaign

Yong Zhao is an American educator and currently the New Foundation Professor at the University of Kansas.

He earned a bachelor's degree in English language education from Sichuan International Studies University and a master's in education and a doctorate in educational psychology both from the University of Illinois at Urbana-Champaign.
