= Ali Dif =

Algerian volleyball player (born 1969)

Personal information
- Nationality: Algerian
- Born: 8 January 1969 (age 56)

Sport
- Sport: Volleyball

Ali Dif (born 8 January 1969) is an Algerian volleyball player. He competed in the men's tournament at the 1992 Summer Olympics.
