= Cosme Prenafeta =

Spanish volleyball player (born 1971)

Personal information
- Full name: Cosme Prenafeta García
- Nationality: Spanish
- Born: December 9, 1971 (age 54); L'Hospitalet de Llobregat, Spain
- Height: 1.88 m (6 ft 2 in)
- Spike: 325 cm (128 in)
- Block: 316 cm (124 in)

Cosme Prenafeta García (born December 9, 1971, in L'Hospitalet de Llobregat, Catalonia, Spain) is a Spanish volleyball player who represented his native country at the 2000 Summer Olympics in Sydney, Australia. There he finished ninth place with the Men's National Team.
