= Dan Landry =

American volleyball player (born 1970)

Personal information
- Born: Daniel Joseph Landry; January 15, 1970 (age 56); San Diego, California, U.S.
- Height: 6 ft 4 in (193 cm)
- Education: University of California, Los Angeles

Volleyball information
- Position: Outside hitter
- Number: 16

National team
1993–2000	United States
Medal record
Men's volleyball
Representing United States
World Championship
Bronze medal – third place	1994 Greece	Indoor
Pan American Games
Silver medal – second place	1995 Mar del Plata	Indoor

Daniel "Dan" Joseph Landry (born January 15, 1970) is an American former volleyball player and two-time Olympian. He was a member of the United States men's national volleyball team at the 1996 Summer Olympics in Atlanta and the 2000 Summer Olympics in Sydney.

== College ==
Landry played volleyball at UCLA and helped the Bruins win the 1993 NCAA Championship.

== Beach volleyball ==
Landry briefly played professional beach volleyball in 2001 and partnered with Jeff Nygaard.
