= Nathan Jakavicius =

Australian volleyball player (born 1977)

Personal information
- Nationality: Australian
- Born: 24 September 1977 (age 49)

National team
2000	Australia

Nathan Jakavicius (born 24 September 1977) is a former Australian male volleyball player. He was part of the Australia men's national volleyball team. He competed with the national team at the 2000 Summer Olympics in Sydney, Australia, finishing 8th.

== See also ==
- Australia at the 2000 Summer Olympics
