= David Kantor =

American systems psychologist, organizational consultant, and clinical researcher

David Kantor (17 December 1927 – 28 March 2021) was an American systems psychologist, organizational consultant, and clinical researcher. He is the founder of three research and training institutes, the author of numerous books and articles, and the inventor of a series of psychometric instruments that provide insight into individual and group behaviors. His groundbreaking empirical research revealed a fundamental structure to all communication, known as Structural Dynamics, which provides the solution to the most common communication challenges experienced in any human system. Kantor's Four Player Model has been referenced by hundreds of other theorists including Peter Senge in The Fifth Discipline, Bill Isaacs in Dialogue: The Art of Thinking Together, and Michael Jensen and Werner Erhard in their revolutionary leadership program: Being a Leader and the Effective Exercise of Leadership as Your Natural Self Expression. His work has made a significant contribution to both family systems therapy and organizational theory and practice.

He has taught and trained thousands of students at institutions including Harvard University, Harvard Medical School, Tufts University School of Medicine, Northeastern University, the Boston Family Institute, the Family Institute of Cambridge, the Kantor Family Institute, and has also been the recipient of multiple grants from the National Institute of Mental Health (NIMH). He is the Founder and Thought Leader of The Kantor Institute.

== Career ==
David Kantor received his B.A. and M.A. from Brooklyn College in 1950 and 1952, respectively, and received his Ph.D. from Brandeis University, Massachusetts in 1963.

Beginning in 1956, he was a lecturer at Harvard University's Department of Social Relations. Kantor's innovative research methods while at Harvard included a study of the effects on career choice of students at Phillips Brook house volunteering in mental hospitals; the effects of student volunteers on the culture and behavior of psychiatric patients; and a study of an alternative treatment modality (a virtual family). The third study, creating halfway houses where students lived with and studied patients full-time, and placing healthy students in mental hospitals (disguised as patients) to directly study treatment of patients and the condition of mental hospitals, was captured by Robert Kaiser on the National Educational Television Network - WTTW His work on the negative effects of institutionalizing patients was instrumental in the movement to shift psychological and psychiatric care toward more effective and beneficial treatment methods where appropriate.

After Harvard, Kantor was an Assistant Professor of Clinical psychiatry at Tufts University School of Medicine from 1965–1975, during which time he also served as first Director of Psychological Research (1966–1969), Director, Center for Training in Family Therapy (1968–1975), and Chief Psychologist (1969–1975) at Boston State Hospital. He also founded the Boston Family Institute in 1967 and the Family Institute of Cambridge in 1974. During this time, Kantor received a grant from the National Institute of Health to study communication patterns in families with schizophrenics. The findings resulted in a theory of face-to-face communication published in Inside the Family in 1975.

In 1980 David founded the Kantor Family Institute, a postgraduate training center for therapists and organizational consultants and served as its Director for fifteen years. During this time David expanded his focus on systems theory to include businesses and other organizations, and also developed his “Theory of Theories.” He also acted as a research consultant to William Isaacs' Dialogue Project at the Organizational Learning Center of the MIT Sloan School of Management.

Kantor's next book resulted from a study that applied systems theory to intimate relationships, My Lover, Myself (1999). An important construct—a typology of three types of heroic behaviors in response to crisis—emerged from this study and is gaining traction among organizational researchers and practitioners.

In 2001, Kantor joined Monitor Group to develop a new model and theory of leadership focused on the development of senior executives. One of the products of this collaboration was the Leadership Model Building (LMB) program utilized by both Monitor's senior leadership and significant clients. From 2001 through 2008, David was the leader of Monitor Kantor Enterprises (MKE), a business unit whose products helped clients develop the necessary organizational leadership and team dynamics capabilities to execute their organizations’ strategies. Clients cited MKE's products and approach as highly influential and essential in helping them make critical decisions and successfully navigate some of their businesses' most extreme challenges.

== Current work ==
Between 2008 and 2011, Kantor continued his thought leadership and research in order to upgrade his concepts to new levels of theoretical credibility. This work is captured in the book, Reading the Room: Group Dynamics for Coaches and Leaders, published in 2012 by Jossey-Bass/Wiley. Reading the Room won a bronze Axiom Business Book award in 2013 in the communications category.

In 2014, Kantor, launched The Kantor Institute to make consulting tools and products based on Structural Dynamics available to trained practitioners. The Kantor Institute has embarked on a quantitative research study with The Massachusetts School of Professional Psychology to empirically demonstrate the efficacy of his theory in improving the effectiveness and efficiency of teams. As a part of this effort, a new generation of practitioners is being trained in real-time coding of the underlying structure of communication and thereby producing measurable data that can be tracked over time.

== Personal life ==
Kantor was married to Meredith Otis and is the father of seven children (five biological and two step-children). He lived in Cambridge, MA. In a show of his playful side, while teaching at Harvard College in the 1960s, he ran a mobile bookstand, an A frame housing “the world’s hundred best books,” in Harvard Square that was pulled behind a donkey. Jenny, the donkey, was housed at the Cambridge Readeasy, a site that is now the Charles Hotel.

== Publications ==
=== Books ===
- Inside the Family, with William Lehr (1st ed.: Jossey-Bass, 1975)
- Intimate Environments, with Barbara Okun (Guilford Press, 1989)
- My Lover, My Self (Riverhead Trade, 2000)
- Love by Labor Lost (Meredith Winter Press, 2005)
- Alive in Time (Meredith Winter Press, 2002)
- Reading the Room: Group Dynamics for Coaches and Leaders (Jossey-Bass, 2012)
- Becoming an Interventionist: A Dangerous and Noble Profession (Kantor, 2019)

=== Articles ===
- “Managing Structural Traps, A Critical Element in Leading Successful Organization Change,” with Steven Ober, Innovation Associates, Inc.
- “Behavioral Archetypes,” Innovation Associates, Inc. v. 11.96, 1996
- "The Systems Thinker," with Joel Yanowitz and Steven Ober, 6:5 (June/July 1995):
- “Reframing Team Relationship:, How the Principles of “Structural Dynamics" Can Help Teams Come to Terms with Their Dark Side”, with Nancy Heaton Lonstein, in Fifth Discipline Fieldbook, Doubleday, 1994.
- “Principles for Human Systems Consulting and a Framework for Human Systems Consulting,” with Steven Ober, 1988
- “Couples Therapy, Crisis Induction, and Change,” pp. 21–71, Casebook of Marital Therapy, Guilford Press, 1985.
- “The Structural-Analytic Approach to the Treatment of Family Developmental Crisis,” Development Theory and Structural Analysis, pp. 12–34, Clinical Implications of the Family Life Cycle, Aspen, 1983.
- “Critical Identity Image: A Concept Linking Individual, Couple, and Family Development,” pp. 137–167, Family Therapy: Combining Psychodynamic and Family Systems Approaches, Grune & Strattion, 1980.
- “Integrative Shifts for the Theory and Practice of Family Systems Therapy,” with John H. Neal, in Family Process 24:1, 13-30. 1985
- "Putting Theory Into Action. The Evolution and Practice of Structural Dynamics." with Deborah Wallace, Sarah Hill, and Tony Melville. Society for Organizational Learning Reflections 14 (2014). Online. https://www.solonline.org/?reflections1401
- "The Thought Leader Interview: David Kantor." with Art Kleiner. Strategy and Business Magazine 71 (2013). Online. http://www.strategy-business.com/article/00154?pg=all
- "Working with an invisible reality." with Sarah Hill. Training Journal (2014). Online. http://www.dialogix.co.uk/wp-content/uploads/2014/10/TJ-AUGUST-2014-low.17-20.pdf

== See also ==
- Monitor Group
- Systems Centered Therapy
