= Max Pereira =

Brazilian volleyball player (born 1970)

Personal information
- Full name: Max Jeferson Pereira
- Born: 27 January 1970 (age 56); Bauru, São Paulo, Brazil
- Height: 1.98 cm (1 in)
- Weight: 93 kg (205 lb)

Volleyball information
- Position: Opposite spiker

National team
1993–2000	Brazil
Honours
Men's volleyball
Representing Brazil
World League
Gold medal – first place	1993 São Paulo
Silver medal – second place	1995 Rio de Janeiro
Bronze medal – third place	1994 Milan
Bronze medal – third place	1999 Mar del Plata
Bronze medal – third place	2000 Rotterdam
South American Championship
Gold medal – first place	1995 Brazil
Gold medal – first place	1999 Argentina

Max Pereira (born 27 January 1970) is a Brazilian former volleyball player. He was part of the Brazil men's national volleyball team. He competed with the national team at the 2000 Summer Olympics in Sydney, Australia, finishing 6th.

== See also ==
- Brazil at the 2000 Summer Olympics
