= Georgios Dragovits =

Greek volleyball player (born 1968)

Personal information
- Nationality: Greek
- Born: 20 October 1968 (age 58)
- Height: 200 cm (6 ft 7 in)
- Weight: 103 kg (227 lb)
- Spike: 345 cm (136 in)
- Block: 330 cm (130 in)

Career
Years	Teams
1987–2001; 2001–2004; 2004–2005; 2005–2006	Olympiacos; A.E. Nikaia; Olympiacos; A.E. Nikaia

National team
1987–2001	Greece (345)
Honours
Men's volleyball
Representing Greece
European Championship
Bronze medal – third place	1987 Ghent	Team competition

Georgios Dragovits (Greek: Γιώργος Ντράγκοβιτς; born 20 October 1968) is a retired Greek male volleyball player. He was part of the Greece men's national volleyball team that won the bronze medal at the 1987 European Championship in Belgium. He was also part of the Greek team at the 1994 FIVB Volleyball Men's World Championship in Greece and the 2002 FIVB Volleyball Men's World Championship in Argentina. He played for Olympiacos for 15 years (1987-2001, 2004-2005) winning two CEV Cup Winners' Cup / CEV Cups (1996, 2005) and numerous domestic titles.
