= Spiros Marazios =

Australian volleyball player (born 1978)

Personal information
- Nationality: Australian
- Born: 11 December 1978 (age 47); Sydney, Australia
- Height: 197 cm (6 ft 6 in)

National team
2000	Australia

Spiros Marazios (born 11 December 1978) is a former Australian male volleyball player. He was part of the Australia men's national volleyball team. He competed with the national team at the 2000 Summer Olympics in Sydney, Australia, finishing 8th.
