= Kim Byung-sun =

South Korean volleyball player (1973–1995)

Personal information
- Nationality: South Korean
- Born: 3 January 1973; Busan, South Korea
- Died: 21 February 1995 (aged 22); Seoul, South Korea
- Height: 200 cm (6 ft 7 in)
- Education: Sungkyunkwan University

Volleyball information
- Number: 8 (national team)

Career
| Years | Teams |
|---|---|
| 1995 | Hyundai |

National team
| 1994 | South Korea |

- Kim Byung-sun
- Hangul: 김병선
- Hanja: 金炳善
- RR: Gim Byeongseon
- MR: Kim Pyŏngsŏn

Kim Byung-sun (Korean: 김병선; 3 January 1973 – 21 February 1995) was a South Korean male volleyball player. He was part of the South Korea men's national volleyball team. He competed in the men's tournament at the 1992 Summer Olympics. He played for Sungkyunkwan University.

== Clubs ==
- Sungkyunkwan University (1994)
- Hyundai (1995)
