= 1994 FIVB Volleyball World League =

International volleyball competition

1994 World League
Tournament details
- Host country: Italy (Final)
- Dates: 6 May – 30 July
- Teams: 12

Final positions
- Champions: Italy (4th title)

Tournament awards
- MVP: (Italy) Andrea Giani

The 1994 FIVB Volleyball World League was the fifth edition of the annual men's international volleyball tournament, played by 12 countries from 6 May to 30 July 1994. The Final Round was held in Milan, Italy.

== Pools composition ==
Pool A	Pool B	Pool C
China; Japan; Italy; Russia	Brazil; Bulgaria; Greece; United States	Cuba; Germany; Netherlands; South Korea

== Intercontinental round ==
=== Pool A ===
Pos	Team	Pld	W	L	Pts	SW	SL	SR	SPW	SPL	SPR	Qualification
1	Russia	12	10	2	22	31	8	3.875	534	403	1.325	Final round
2	Italy (Note: Qualified as hosts) (H)	12	9	3	21	29	14	2.071	576	455	1.266	Final round
3	Japan	12	4	8	16	16	26	0.615	466	547	0.852	
4	China	12	1	11	13	5	33	0.152	373	544	0.686	

(H) Host
Notes:

Date		Score		Set 1	Set 2	Set 3	Set 4	Set 5	Total
6 May	Italy	3–1	China	16–14	15–3	12–15	15–11		58–43
6 May	Japan	0–3	Russia	12–15	6–15	7–15			25–45
7 May	Italy	3–0	China	17–15	15–8	15–9			47–32
7 May	Japan	3–1	Russia	14–16	16–14	15–7	15–8		60–45
13 May	Japan	2–3	Italy	10–15	15–7	6–15	15–13	12–15	58–65
13 May	China	0–3	Russia	7–15	13–15	9–15			29–45
14 May	Japan	1–3	Italy	11–15	7–15	15–10	3–15		36–55
14 May	China	0–3	Russia	12–15	10–15	6–15			28–45
20 May	Russia	3–0	Japan	15–12	15–13	15–8			45–33
20 May	China	0–3	Italy	7–15	10–15	5–15			22–45
21 May	Russia	3–0	Japan	15–11	15–10	15–3			45–24
21 May	China	0–3	Italy	12–15	9–15	8–15			29–45
27 May	Russia	3–1	Italy	15–10	11–15	15–4	15–7		56–36
27 May	China	1–3	Japan	11–15	7–15	15–12	13–15		46–57
28 May	Russia	3–0	Italy	15–13	15–7	15–13			45–33
28 May	China	0–3	Japan	7–15	13–15	9–15			29–45
3 Jun	Italy	1–3	Russia	5–15	13–15	15–5	12–15		45–50
3 Jun	Japan	3–0	China	15–13	15–3	15–9			45–25
4 Jun	Italy	3–0	Russia	15–7	15–11	15–5			45–23
4 Jun	Japan	0–3	China	4–15	11–15	7–15			22–45
10 Jun	Russia	3–0	China	15–6	15–9	15–8			45–23
10 Jun	Italy	3–0	Japan	15–3	15–11	15–2			45–16
11 Jun	Russia	3–0	China	15–5	15–9	15–8			45–22
11 Jun	Italy	3–1	Japan	15–9	12–15	15–10	15–11		57–45

=== Pool B ===
Pos	Team	Pld	W	L	Pts	SW	SL	SR	SPW	SPL	SPR	Qualification
1	Brazil	12	12	0	24	36	3	12.000	582	361	1.612	Final round
2	Bulgaria	12	7	5	19	24	16	1.500	506	448	1.129	Final round
3	Greece	12	5	7	17	15	27	0.556	469	558	0.841	
4	United States	12	0	12	12	7	36	0.194	438	628	0.697	

Date		Score		Set 1	Set 2	Set 3	Set 4	Set 5	Total
6 May	Bulgaria	1–3	Brazil	15–11	11–15	15–17	6–15		47–58
6 May	United States	1–3	Greece	16–14	15–17	9–15	12–15		52–61
7 May	Bulgaria	0–3	Brazil	5–15	13–15	11–15			29–45
7 May	United States	0–3	Greece	6–15	8–15	8–15			22–45
13 May	Bulgaria	3–0	United States	15–5	15–11	15–7			45–23
13 May	Greece	0–3	Brazil	14–16	14–16	10–15			38–47
14 May	Bulgaria	3–0	United States	15–13	16–14	15–6			46–33
14 May	Greece	0–3	Brazil	5–15	5–15	12–15			22–45
20 May	Brazil	3–0	United States	15–0	15–10	15–12			45–22
20 May	Greece	3–2	Bulgaria	10–15	6–15	15–10	15–10	15–13	61–63
21 May	Brazil	3–0	United States	15–7	15–7	15–11			45–25
21 May	Greece	0–3	Bulgaria	9–15	10–15	4–15			23–45
27 May	Brazil	3–0	Greece	15–8	15–5	15–10			45–23
27 May	United States	0–3	Bulgaria	13–15	4–15	10–15			27–45
28 May	Brazil	3–0	Greece	17–16	15–2	15–13			47–31
28 May	United States	1–3	Bulgaria	7–15	15–12	14–16	10–15		46–58
3 Jun	Bulgaria	3–0	Greece	15–12	15–8	15–4			45–24
3 Jun	United States	2–3	Brazil	7–15	15–13	15–12	11–15	13–15	61–70
4 Jun	Bulgaria	3–0	Greece	15–7	15–4	15–7			45–18
4 Jun	United States	0–3	Brazil	9–15	13–15	3–15			25–45
10 Jun	Brazil	3–0	Bulgaria	15–5	15–12	15–7			45–24
10 Jun	Greece	3–1	United States	15–2	15–12	8–15	15–9		53–38
11 Jun	Brazil	3–0	Bulgaria	15–6	15–2	15–6			45–14
11 Jun	Greece	3–2	United States	12–15	15–9	13–15	15–13	15–12	70–64

=== Pool C ===
Pos	Team	Pld	W	L	Pts	SW	SL	SR	SPW	SPL	SPR	Qualification
1	Netherlands	12	11	1	23	34	11	3.091	630	453	1.391	Final round
2	Cuba	12	9	3	21	28	14	2.000	534	454	1.176	Final round
3	South Korea	12	2	10	14	17	30	0.567	549	616	0.891	
4	Germany	12	2	10	14	9	33	0.273	387	577	0.671	

Date		Score		Set 1	Set 2	Set 3	Set 4	Set 5	Total
6 May	Cuba	0–3	Netherlands	13–15	5–15	10–15			28–45
6 May	South Korea	3–0	Germany	15–11	15–11	15–4			45–26
7 May	Cuba	0–3	Netherlands	11–15	6–15	14–16			31–46
7 May	South Korea	2–3	Germany	12–15	5–15	15–7	15–13	12–15	59–65
13 May	South Korea	0–3	Cuba	9–15	9–15	9–15			27–45
13 May	Germany	0–3	Netherlands	3–15	8–15	4–15			15–45
14 May	South Korea	2–3	Cuba	15–9	6–15	14–16	15–9	10–15	60–64
14 May	Germany	1–3	Netherlands	15–12	4–15	4–15	9–15		32–57
20 May	Netherlands	3–2	South Korea	9–15	15–6	11–15	15–13	15–13	65–62
20 May	Germany	0–3	Cuba	7–15	13–15	9–15			29–45
21 May	Netherlands	3–2	South Korea	15–13	15–8	12–15	11–15	15–10	68–61
21 May	Germany	0–3	Cuba	8–15	6–15	13–15			27–45
27 May	Netherlands	3–1	Germany	15–11	9–15	15–13	15–6		54–45
27 May	Cuba	3–0	South Korea	15–7	15–12	15–13			45–32
28 May	Netherlands	3–0	Germany	15–12	15–5	15–11			45–28
28 May	Cuba	3–1	South Korea	15–9	11–15	15–12	15–9		56–45
3 Jun	Cuba	3–0	Germany	15–7	15–6	15–8			45–21
3 Jun	South Korea	1–3	Netherlands	15–12	3–15	5–15	11–15		34–57
4 Jun	Cuba	3–1	Germany	15–7	15–6	15–8			45–21
4 Jun	South Korea	0–3	Netherlands	12–15	15–17	5–15			32–47
10 Jun	Netherlands	1–3	Cuba	15–7	10–15	10–15	14–16		49–53
10 Jun	Germany	0–3	South Korea	9–15	10–15	9–15			28–45
11 Jun	Netherlands	3–1	Cuba	15–4	7–15	15–8	15–5		52–32
11 Jun	Germany	3–1	South Korea	15–8	15–12	5–15	15–12		50–47

== Final round ==
- Venue: Forum di Assago, Assago, Italy

=== Pool play ===
- Pool winners of Intercontinental Round will play against runners-up from other pools.

Pos	Team	Pld	W	L	Pts	SW	SL	SR	SPW	SPL	SPR	Qualification
1	Brazil	2	2	0	4	6	0	MAX	92	68	1.353	Semifinals
2	Bulgaria	2	2	0	4	6	2	3.000	112	91	1.231	Semifinals
3	Cuba	2	1	1	3	3	5	0.600	96	103	0.932	Semifinals
4	Italy	2	1	1	3	3	5	0.600	97	105	0.924	Semifinals
5	Netherlands	2	0	2	2	4	6	0.667	124	128	0.969	
6	Russia	2	0	2	2	2	6	0.333	83	109	0.761	

Date		Score		Set 1	Set 2	Set 3	Set 4	Set 5	Total
27 Jul	Netherlands	2–3	Bulgaria	15–13	14–16	15–8	9–15	11–15	64–67
27 Jul	Russia	2–3	Cuba	15–10	15–9	9–15	5–15	12–15	56–64
27 Jul	Brazil	3–0	Italy	15–12	15–12	15–12			45–36
28 Jul	Netherlands	2–3	Italy	15–9	15–7	10–15	8–15	12–15	60–61
28 Jul	Russia	0–3	Bulgaria	13–15	8–15	6–15			27–45
28 Jul	Brazil	3–0	Cuba	15–12	15–4	17–16			47–32

=== Final four ===
Semifinals
29 July
Brazil	2
Cuba	3
29 July
Bulgaria	0
Italy	3

Final
30 July
Cuba	0
Italy	3
3rd place match
30 July
Brazil	3
Bulgaria	2

==== Semifinals ====
Date		Score		Set 1	Set 2	Set 3	Set 4	Set 5	Total
29 Jul	Brazil	2–3	Cuba	11–15	15–6	15–5	12–15	20–22	73–63
29 Jul	Bulgaria	0–3	Italy	4–15	4–15	13–15			21–45

==== 3rd place match ====
Date		Score		Set 1	Set 2	Set 3	Set 4	Set 5	Total
30 Jul	Brazil	3–2	Bulgaria	15–10	12–15	15–10	12–15	15–8	69–58

==== Final ====
Date		Score		Set 1	Set 2	Set 3	Set 4	Set 5	Total
30 Jul	Cuba	0–3	Italy	13–15	8–15	9–15			30–45

== Final standing ==
Rank	Team
1st place, gold medalist(s)	Italy
2nd place, silver medalist(s)	Cuba
3rd place, bronze medalist(s)	Brazil
4	Bulgaria
5	Netherlands
6	Russia
7	Greece
8	Japan
9	South Korea
10	Germany
11	China
12	United States

1994 World League champions

Italy
4th title

== Awards ==
- Most valuable player
  - (Italy) Andrea Giani
- Best spiker
  - (South Korea) Kim Se-jin
- Best setter
  - (South Korea) Shin Young-chul
- Best blocker
  - (Netherlands) Jan Posthuma
- Best server
  - (Bulgaria) Lyubomir Ganev
- Best receiver
  - (South Korea) Park Hee-sang
- Best digger
  - (Japan) Akihiko Matsuda
