= Gilson Bernardo =

Brazilian volleyball player (born 1968)

Personal information
- Full name: Gilson Alves Bernardo
- Nickname: Gilson
- Born: 20 February 1968 (age 58); Contagem, Minas Gerais, Brazil
- Height: 1.94 m (6 ft 4 in)
- Weight: 94 kg (207 lb)

Volleyball information
- Position: Opposite
- Number: 16

Career
Years	Teams
1993–1994	Palmeiras S.Paolo

National team
1992–1997, 2002	Brazil
Honours
Men's volleyball
Representing Brazil
World Cup
Bronze medal – third place	1995 Japan
World Grand Champions Cup
Silver medal – second place	1993 Japan
World League
Silver medal – second place	1995 Rio de Janeiro
Bronze medal – third place	1994 Milan
South American Championship
Gold medal – first place	1995 Brazil

Gilson Alves Bernardo (born 20 February 1968) is a Brazilian former volleyball player. He was part of the Brazilian men's national volleyball team at the 1996 Summer Olympics in Atlanta. He played for Palmeiras S.Paolo.

== Clubs ==
- Palmeiras S.Paolo (1993–1994)
