= Museum of Russian Impressionism =

Art museum in Moscow, Russia

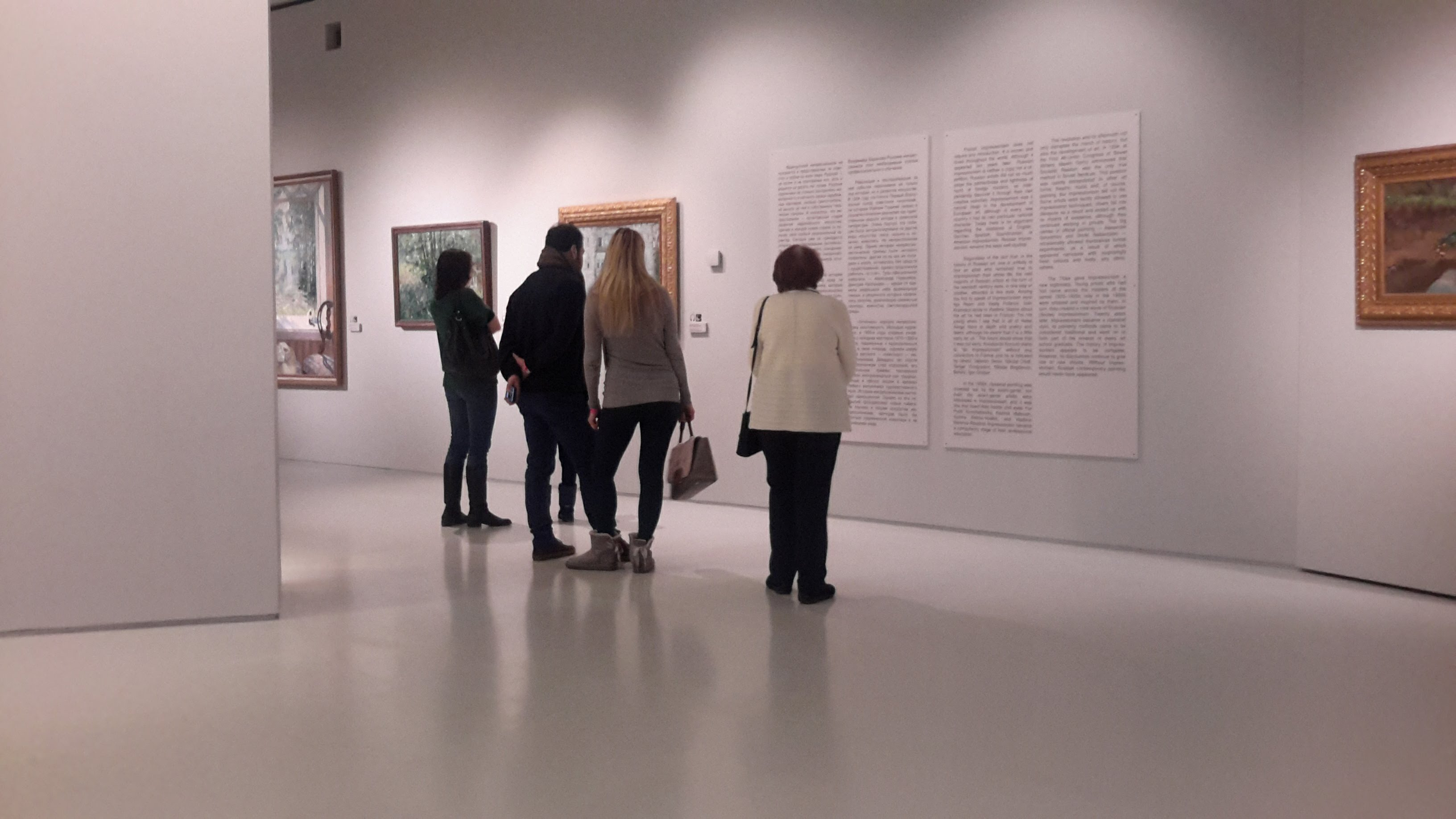
- Established: May 28, 2016; 9 years ago
- Location: Russia, Moscow (Leningradskiy prospect, 15 / 11)
- Founder: Boris Mints
- Director: Yulia Petrova
- Website: www.rusimp.su

The Museum of Russian Impressionism is an art museum in Moscow dedicated to Russian art from the late 19th to the first third of the 20th century.

== History ==
The museum's founder, Boris Mints has been collecting Russian painting and graphic art since 2001, primarily works by artists of the late 19th and early 20th centuries. His collection includes works by Valentin Serov, Konstantin Korovin, Boris Kustodiev, Pyotr Konchalovsky, Vasily Polenov, Yuri Pimenov, and Aleksandr Gerasimov. Some of these works are on display in the private Museum of Russian Impressionism, for which Mintz commissioned a building on the site of his former Bolshevik confectionery factory. British architectural bureau John McAslan + Partners was chosen to design the building project and in 2012 started its construction, which cost $16.5 million.

Under the direction of Director Yulia Petrova, the museum began its activities in 2014 when MacDougall's auction house held a series of exhibitions in Moscow and other regions of Russia. It was opened to the public on May 28, 2016. A joint project with the Library of Foreign Literature, "Painting in the Library", toured several major Russian cities for nearly three years and led the museum to the finals of the 2016 Intermuseum Prize. In 2016, 2022, and 2024 it was longlisted for The Art Newspaper Russia Prize in the Museum of the Year category.

In 2024, the museum announced a change in its trustee partner. Vladimir Voronin, an entrepreneur and shareholder in the FSK Group of Companies, became the new trustee and Chairman of the Board of Trustees.

== Collections ==
In The Park (1880) by Russian Impressionist Konstantin Korovin is the earliest painting featured in the museum.
