= Jin Chang-uk =

South Korean volleyball player (born 1972)

Personal information
- Nationality: South Korean
- Born: 18 July 1972 (age 52)

Sport
- Sport: Volleyball

Jin Chang-uk (born 18 July 1972) is a South Korean volleyball player. He competed in the men's tournament at the 1992 Summer Olympics.
