= Norihiko Miyazaki =

Japanese volleyball player (born 1969)

Personal information
- Nationality: Japanese
- Born: 1 September 1969 (age 57)
- Height: 192 cm (6 ft 4 in)

Volleyball information
- Position: wing spiker
- Number: 16 (national team)

Career
Years	Teams
1994	Matsushita Denki

National team
1994-1998	Japan

Norihiko Miyazaki (born September 1, 1969, in Saijō, Ehime) is a former volleyball player from Japan, who played as a wing-spiker for the Men's National Team during the 1990s. He attained 10th place at the 1998 World Championship.

== Honours ==
- 1998 World Championship — 16th place
