= Alexis Batle =

Cuban volleyball player (born 1971)

Personal information
- Full name: Alexis Batle Arredono
- Born: 28 July 1971; Villa Clara, Cuba
- Died: 23 February 2023 (aged 51); Villa Clara, Cuba
- Height: 1.96 m (6 ft 5 in)

Volleyball information
- Position: Opposite
- Number: 17

National team
1990–2000	Cuba
Honours
Men's volleyball
Representing Cuba
World Grand Champions Cup
Bronze medal – third place	1997 Japan
Pan American Games
Gold medal – first place	1999 Winnipeg	Team
Bronze medal – third place	1995 Mar del Plata	Team
Central American and Caribbean Games
Gold medal – first place	1990 Mexico City	Team
Gold medal – first place	1993 Ponce	Team

Alexis Batle (28 July 1971 – 26 February 2023), also known as Alexis Batte, was a Cuban volleyball player. Batle competed with the Cuban men's national volleyball team at the 1996 Summer Olympics in Atlanta. He won a bronze medal at the 1995 Pan American Games in Mar del Plata and a gold medal at the 1999 Pan American Games in Winnipeg with the Cuban team.
