= Sebastián Firpo =

Argentine volleyball player (born 1976)

Sebastian Firpo

Personal information
- Nationality: Argentine
- Born: 27 October 1976 (age 50)

National team
| 2000 | Argentina |

Sebastian Firpo (born 27 October 1976) is a former Argentine male volleyball player. He was part of the Argentina men's national volleyball team. He competed with the national team at the 2000 Summer Olympics in Sydney, Australia, finishing 4th.

== See also ==
- Argentina at the 2000 Summer Olympics
