= Sin Jeong-seop =

South Korean volleyball player (born 1974)

Personal information
- Nationality: South Korean
- Born: 30 May 1974 (age 50)

Sport
- Sport: Volleyball

Sin Jeong-seop (born 30 May 1974) is a South Korean volleyball player. He competed in the men's tournament at the 1996 Summer Olympics.
