= Minoru Takeuchi =

Japanese volleyball player (born 1971)

Minoru Takeuchi (竹内 実 Takeuchi Minoru, born February 23, 1971, in Nishinomiya) is a former volleyball player from Japan, who played as a wing-spiker for the Men's National Team during the 1990s. He ended up in 10th place at the 1998 World Championship.

== Honours ==
- 1998 World Championship — 16th place
