= Ivan Tasev (volleyball) =

Bulgarian volleyball player (born 1967)

Personal information
- Nationality: Bulgarian
- Born: 21 March 1967 (age 58); Pazardzhik, Bulgaria

Sport
- Sport: Volleyball

Ivan Tasev (Bulgarian: Иван Тасев, born 21 March 1967) is a Bulgarian volleyball player. He competed in the men's tournament at the 2008 Summer Olympics.
