= Sebastián Jabif =

Argentine volleyball player (born 1973)

Personal information
- Nationality: Argentine
- Born: 24 January 1973 (age 53)

Sport
- Sport: Volleyball

Sebastián Jabif (born 24 January 1973) is an Argentine volleyball player. He competed in the men's tournament at the 1996 Summer Olympics.
