= Tom Sorensen =

American volleyball player

Personal information
- Full name: Thomas Michael Sorensen
- Born: April 6, 1971 (age 55); Racine, Wisconsin, U.S.
- Height: 6 ft 6 in (1.98 m)
- Education: Pepperdine University

Volleyball information
- Position: Middle blocker
- Number: 6

National team
| 1991–2000 | United States |
Medal record
Men's volleyball
Representing the United States
World Championship
| Bronze medal – third place | 1994 Greece | Team |
Pan American Games
| Silver medal – second place | 1995 Mar del Plata | Team |

Thomas Sorensen (born April 6, 1971) is an American former volleyball player who was a member of the United States men's national volleyball team at the 1996 Summer Olympics in Atlanta.

The 1991 FIVB World League was the first event Sorensen competed in as a national team member. He won a bronze medal with the United States at the 1994 FIVB World Championship in Greece.

== Early life ==
Sorensen played volleyball at Racine Case High School in Racine, Wisconsin. He was the Racine County Player of the Year in 1988 and 1989, and was twice named MVP in his state. He graduated from high school in 1989.

== College ==
Sorensen attended Pepperdine University, where he was a three-time All-American and helped his team win the NCAA Championship in 1992. He set the Waves record for career kills with 2,207. He set the record for kills in a match with 53 against UCLA on February 25, 1993.

Sorensen was inducted into the Pepperdine Hall of Fame in 2015.

== Coaching ==
Sorensen currently serves as an assistant volleyball coach for both the women's and men's teams at Mod Volleyball in Illinois.

== Awards ==
- Three-time All-American
- NCAA Champion — 1992
- FIVB World Championship bronze medal — 1994
- Pan American Games silver medal — 1995
- Pepperdine Hall of Fame — 2015
