= 1995 FIVB Volleyball World League =

International volleyball competition

1995 World League
Tournament details
- Host country: Brazil (Final)
- Dates: 19 May – 9 July
- Teams: 12

Final positions
- Champions: Italy (5th title)

The 1995 FIVB Volleyball World League was the sixth edition of the annual men's international volleyball tournament, played by 12 countries from 19 May to 9 July 1995. The Final Round was held in Rio de Janeiro (Main) and Belo Horizonte (Sub), Brazil.

== Pools composition ==
Pool A	Pool B	Pool C
Brazil; Cuba; Spain; United States	Bulgaria; Greece; Italy; Netherlands	China; Japan; Russia; South Korea

== Intercontinental round ==
=== Pool A ===
Pos	Team	Pld	W	L	Pts	SW	SL	SR	SPW	SPL	SPR	Qualification
1	Brazil (Note: Qualified as hosts) (H)	12	7	5	19	26	21	1.238	637	575	1.108	Final round
2	Cuba	12	7	5	19	27	22	1.227	635	568	1.118	Final round
3	Spain	12	6	6	18	22	26	0.846	575	635	0.906	
4	United States	12	6	6	18	20	26	0.769	550	619	0.889	

(H) Host
Notes:

Date		Score		Set 1	Set 2	Set 3	Set 4	Set 5	Total
19 May	Spain	0–3	Brazil	7–15	12–15	9–15			28–45
19 May	United States	3–1	Cuba	8–15	15–11	15–13	15–10		53–49
20 May	Spain	3–1	Brazil	15–10	15–13	8–15	15–13		53–51
20 May	United States	3–0	Cuba	15–10	15–12	15–6			45–28
26 May	Brazil	2–3	Spain	14–16	15–8	15–9	9–15	21–23	74–71
26 May	Cuba	3–1	United States	14–16	15–12	15–4	15–7		59–39
27 May	Brazil	3–0	Spain	15–7	15–4	15–7			45–18
27 May	Cuba	3–1	United States	15–2	8–15	15–4	15–13		53–34
2 Jun	Spain	1–3	Cuba	10–15	11–15	15–6	11–15		47–51
2 Jun	United States	1–3	Brazil	14–16	12–15	17–16	2–15		45–62
3 Jun	Spain	1–3	Cuba	15–10	7–15	9–15	3–15		34–55
3 Jun	United States	3–0	Brazil	15–10	15–11	15–10			45–31
9 Jun	Cuba	1–3	Brazil	15–13	15–17	5–15	10–15		45–60
9 Jun	Spain	3–2	United States	16–14	16–14	10–15	11–15	19–17	72–75
10 Jun	Cuba	3–2	Brazil	12–15	15–10	12–15	16–14	15–12	70–66
10 Jun	Spain	3–1	United States	15–6	10–15	15–10	15–3		55–34
16 Jun	Brazil	3–1	United States	15–9	15–12	8–15	15–10		53–46
16 Jun	Cuba	3–1	Spain	15–4	15–8	11–15	15–8		56–35
17 Jun	Brazil	3–1	United States	15–11	13–15	17–15	15–10		60–51
17 Jun	Cuba	2–3	Spain	14–16	15–12	15–6	14–16	8–15	66–65
23 Jun	Brazil	3–2	Cuba	15–6	6–15	15–9	16–17	15–11	67–58
23 Jun	United States	0–3	Spain	11–15	9–15	6–15			26–45
24 Jun	Brazil	0–3	Cuba	11–15	4–15	8–15			23–45
24 Jun	United States	3–1	Spain	15–13	11–15	16–14	15–10		57–52

=== Pool B ===
Pos	Team	Pld	W	L	Pts	SW	SL	SR	SPW	SPL	SPR	Qualification
1	Italy	12	10	2	22	32	12	2.667	621	468	1.327	Final round
2	Bulgaria	12	9	3	21	28	17	1.647	630	550	1.145	Final round
3	Greece	12	3	9	15	14	30	0.467	494	600	0.823	
4	Netherlands	12	2	10	14	16	31	0.516	517	644	0.803	

Date		Score		Set 1	Set 2	Set 3	Set 4	Set 5	Total
19 May	Italy	3–0	Bulgaria	15–8	17–15	15–10			47–33
19 May	Netherlands	3–0	Greece	15–11	15–12	15–8			45–31
20 May	Italy	0–3	Bulgaria	8–15	12–15	14–16			34–46
20 May	Netherlands	3–1	Greece	15–10	10–15	15–8	15–8		55–41
26 May	Bulgaria	3–1	Netherlands	16–17	15–10	15–13	15–10		61–50
26 May	Greece	0–3	Italy	14–16	9–15	8–15			31–46
27 May	Bulgaria	3–0	Netherlands	15–5	15–8	15–6			45–19
27 May	Greece	0–3	Italy	8–15	7–15	8–15			23–45
2 Jun	Greece	2–3	Bulgaria	12–15	12–15	15–13	15–10	15–17	69–70
2 Jun	Netherlands	2–3	Italy	15–10	10–15	15–11	5–15	12–15	57–66
3 Jun	Greece	1–3	Bulgaria	15–11	14–16	9–15	9–15		47–57
3 Jun	Netherlands	2–3	Italy	15–13	15–8	6–15	15–12	12–15	63–63
9 Jun	Italy	3–0	Greece	15–5	15–4	15–2			45–11
9 Jun	Netherlands	0–3	Bulgaria	8–15	10–15	4–15			22–45
10 Jun	Italy	3–0	Greece	15–6	15–10	15–6			45–22
10 Jun	Netherlands	1–3	Bulgaria	12–15	15–13	7–15	13–15		47–58
16 Jun	Bulgaria	3–2	Italy	15–11	15–17	16–14	11–15	15–8	72–65
16 Jun	Greece	3–2	Netherlands	15–10	15–11	12–15	13–15	15–10	70–61
17 Jun	Bulgaria	1–3	Italy	9–15	15–13	14–16	12–15		50–59
17 Jun	Greece	3–1	Netherlands	15–10	13–15	15–7	15–6		58–38
23 Jun	Italy	3–0	Netherlands	15–8	15–8	15–3			45–19
23 Jun	Bulgaria	3–1	Greece	15–8	15–13	11–15	15–9		56–45
24 Jun	Italy	3–1	Netherlands	15–7	16–17	15–6	15–11		61–41
24 Jun	Bulgaria	0–3	Greece	10–15	13–15	14–16			37–46

=== Pool C ===
Pos	Team	Pld	W	L	Pts	SW	SL	SR	SPW	SPL	SPR	Qualification
1	Russia	12	10	2	22	34	12	2.833	648	467	1.388	Final round
2	South Korea	12	6	6	18	21	24	0.875	513	553	0.928	Final round
3	Japan	12	4	8	16	18	27	0.667	514	594	0.865	
4	China	12	4	8	16	18	28	0.643	546	607	0.900	

Date		Score		Set 1	Set 2	Set 3	Set 4	Set 5	Total
19 May	Japan	1–3	Russia	17–16	5–15	16–17	12–15		50–63
19 May	China	3–0	South Korea	15–5	17–15	15–11			47–31
20 May	Japan	1–3	Russia	15–4	6–15	10–15	3–15		34–49
20 May	China	2–3	South Korea	8–15	15–4	15–10	12–15	12–15	62–59
26 May	South Korea	1–3	Russia	8–15	10–15	15–11	9–15		42–56
26 May	China	1–3	Japan	15–17	11–15	15–12	11–15		52–59
27 May	South Korea	0–3	Russia	9–15	8–15	6–15			23–45
27 May	China	1–3	Japan	15–6	11–15	10–15	14–16		50–52
2 Jun	Russia	3–0	China	15–8	15–7	15–9			45–24
2 Jun	South Korea	3–0	Japan	15–12	15–9	16–14			46–35
3 Jun	Russia	3–0	China	15–11	15–8	16–14			46–33
3 Jun	South Korea	3–1	Japan	15–10	3–15	15–9	15–10		48–44
9 Jun	Russia	3–1	Japan	14–16	15–3	15–5	15–7		59–31
9 Jun	South Korea	3–0	China	15–3	15–7	15–6			45–16
10 Jun	Russia	3–0	Japan	15–13	16–14	15–2			46–29
10 Jun	South Korea	1–3	China	15–6	16–17	6–15	9–15		46–53
16 Jun	Russia	3–1	South Korea	15–2	9–15	17–15	15–3		56–35
16 Jun	Japan	1–3	China	4–15	15–17	15–6	14–16		48–54
17 Jun	Russia	2–3	South Korea	15–2	14–16	15–13	13–15	9–15	66–61
17 Jun	Japan	3–1	China	13–15	15–11	16–14	15–10		59–50
23 Jun	Japan	1–3	South Korea	4–15	15–10	1–15	8–15		28–55
23 Jun	China	1–3	Russia	6–15	14–16	17–15	4–15		41–61
24 Jun	Japan	3–0	South Korea	15–13	15–3	15–6			45–22
24 Jun	China	3–2	Russia	15–10	10–15	9–15	15–3	15–13	64–56

== Final round ==
=== Pool play ===
- Teams from the same pool of Intercontinental Round will not play.

Pos	Team	Pld	W	L	Pts	SW	SL	SR	SPW	SPL	SPR	Qualification
1	Brazil	4	3	1	7	11	4	2.750	212	156	1.359	Final
2	Italy	4	3	1	7	10	6	1.667	216	182	1.187	Final
3	Cuba	4	2	2	6	8	7	1.143	210	177	1.186	3rd place match
4	Russia	4	2	2	6	7	7	1.000	156	174	0.897	3rd place match
5	Bulgaria	4	2	2	6	6	8	0.750	169	180	0.939	
6	South Korea	4	0	4	4	2	12	0.167	112	206	0.544	

- Venue: Mineirinho Arena, Belo Horizonte, Brazil

Date		Score		Set 1	Set 2	Set 3	Set 4	Set 5	Total
4 Jul	Italy	3–1	South Korea	15–4	12–15	15–7	15–9		57–35
4 Jul	Cuba	3–0	Russia	15–9	15–8	15–5			45–22
4 Jul	Brazil	3–0	Bulgaria	15–5	15–8	15–13			45–26
5 Jul	Bulgaria	3–0	South Korea	15–6	15–4	15–6			45–16
5 Jul	Italy	3–0	Cuba	15–13	15–10	15–9			45–32
5 Jul	Brazil	3–1	Russia	15–4	13–15	15–8	15–11		58–38
6 Jul	Russia	3–0	Bulgaria	15–10	15–10	15–2			45–22
6 Jul	Cuba	3–1	South Korea	14–16	15–6	15–6	15–6		59–34
6 Jul	Italy	3–2	Brazil	15–11	10–15	15–12	10–15	15–11	65–64

- Venue: Ginásio do Maracanãzinho, Rio de Janeiro, Brazil

Date		Score		Set 1	Set 2	Set 3	Set 4	Set 5	Total
8 Jul	Bulgaria	3–2	Cuba	11–15	10–15	15–13	15–8	25–23	76–74
8 Jul	Russia	3–1	Italy	5–15	16–14	15–13	15–7		51–49
8 Jul	Brazil	3–0	South Korea	15–10	15–5	15–12			45–27

=== Finals ===
- Venue: Ginásio do Maracanãzinho, Rio de Janeiro, Brazil

==== 3rd place match ====
Date		Score		Set 1	Set 2	Set 3	Set 4	Set 5	Total
9 Jul	Cuba	3–2	Russia	15–13	15–10	14–16	11–15	15–13	70–67

==== Final ====
Date		Score		Set 1	Set 2	Set 3	Set 4	Set 5	Total
9 Jul	Brazil	1–3	Italy	12–15	15–7	9–15	12–15		48–52

== Final standing ==
Rank	Team
1st place, gold medalist(s)	Italy
2nd place, silver medalist(s)	Brazil
3rd place, bronze medalist(s)	Cuba
4	Russia
5	Bulgaria
6	South Korea
7	Spain
8	Japan
9	Greece
10	United States
11	China
12	Netherlands

1995 World League champions

Italy
5th title

== Awards ==
=== Final round ===
- Best scorer: (Russia) Dmitriy Fomin
- Best spiker: (Brazil) Gilson Bernardo
- Best blocker: (Italy) Pasquale Gravina
- Best server: (Brazil) Gilson Bernardo

=== Intercontinental round ===
- Best scorer: (Spain) Rafael Pascual
- Best spiker: (Cuba) Osvaldo Hernández
- Best blocker: (Russia) Oleg Shatunov
- Best server: (Bulgaria) Lyubomir Ganev
