= Kent Greves =

Canadian volleyball player

Kent Douglas Greves (born April 29, 1968 in Brandon, Manitoba) is a former professional and Olympian volleyball setter from Canada.

The 190 cm, 90 kg Greves first played pro for club Lennik in Belgium in 1992-3. He played the following season for Montpellier UC in France. He returned to Belgium to play for Noliko Maaseik in 1995-6 and 1996-7 and then played again in France for 1997-8 with Paris SG-Asnières.

Greves's next and last pro club, Paris Volley, he remained with for five seasons, 1998-9 through 2002-3, and with them won both the CEV Cup Winner's Cup. The club was coached by compatriot Glen Hoag and featured fellow Canadian players Paul Duerden, Jason Haldane, and Sabastian Rouette.

A resident of Calgary, Alberta, and assistant coach of the University of Calgary, Greves played for Canada's last men's team to qualify for the Olympic games, the 1992 squad.

Greves played college volleyball with Mount Royal College and was named a Canadian small colleges All-Canadian in 1987-8.

== Sources ==
- French Wikipedia article page for Greves
- Canadian Olympic Committee website
- www.ccaa.ca
- sports-reference
