= David Beard (volleyball) =

Australian volleyball player (born 1973)

David Beard (born 23 October 1973) is an Australian volleyball player, who twice competed for the Men's National Team at the Summer Olympics: Sydney 2000 and Athens 2004.

Born in Albany, Western Australia, Beard started his volleyball career at Monbulk College in 1983. Beard played as a passer or power hitter. He was the captain of the national squad for several years and competed professionally in Japan, Germany and Italy.
