= Akihiko Matsuda =

Japanese volleyball player (born 1965)

Personal information
- Born: 22 June 1965 (age 61); Kyoto, Kyoto, Japan
- Height: 1.80 m (5 ft 11 in)

Volleyball information
- Position: Setter
- Number: 4

National team
1992-1995	Japan
Honours
Men's volleyball
Representing Japan
Asian Games
Gold medal – first place	1994 Hiroshima	Team

Akihiko Matsuda (born 22 June 1965) is a Japanese former volleyball player who competed in the 1992 Summer Olympics.
