= Faycal Gharzouli =

Algerian volleyball player (born 1970)

Personal information
- Nationality: Algerian
- Born: 9 January 1970 (age 55)

Sport
- Sport: Volleyball

Faycal Gharzouli (born 9 January 1970) is an Algerian volleyball player. He competed in the men's tournament at the 1992 Summer Olympics.
