= Ricardo Vantes =

Cuban volleyball player

Personal information
- Full name: Ricardo Vantes Rodríguez
- Born: 21 April 1967 (age 59); Camagüey, Cuba
- Height: 1.91 m (6 ft 3 in)

Volleyball information
- Position: Outside hitter
- Number: 3

National team
1989–1997	Cuba
Honours
Men's volleyball
Representing Cuba
World Championship
Silver medal – second place	1990 Brazil	Team
Goodwill Games
Bronze medal – third place	1990 Seattle
Pan American Games
Gold medal – first place	1991 Havana	Team

Ricardo Vantes (born 21 April 1967) is a Cuban former indoor volleyball player. Vantes competed in the men's tournament at the 1996 Summer Olympics in Atlanta, where Cuba finished in sixth place. He was an outside hitter who was known for his defensive and passing skills.

Vantes helped the Cuban team win the silver medal at the 1990 FIVB World Championship in Brazil and the gold medal at the 1991 Pan American Games in Havana.
