= Theodoros Bozidis =

Greek volleyball player (born 1973)

Personal information
- Nationality: Greek
- Born: 8 April 1973 (age 53)
- Height: 195 cm (6 ft 5 in)
- Weight: 93 kg (205 lb)
- Spike: 330 cm (130 in)
- Block: 325 cm (128 in)

Volleyball information

Career
- Years: Team
- 2002: Iraklis Thessaloniki

National team
- Years: Team
- –: Greece

Theodoros Bozidis (born 8 April 1973) is a retired Greek volleyball player. He was part of the Greece men's national volleyball team at the 2002 FIVB Volleyball Men's World Championship in Argentina.

== Clubs ==
- Iraklis Thessaloniki (2002)
