= Eduardo Rodríguez (volleyball) =

Argentine volleyball player (born 1971)

Personal information
- Nationality: Argentine
- Born: 15 December 1971 (age 54)

Sport
- Sport: Volleyball

Eduardo Rodríguez (born 15 December 1971) is an Argentine volleyball player. He competed in the men's tournament at the 1996 Summer Olympics.
