= Damian Dacewicz =

Polish volleyball player (born 1974)

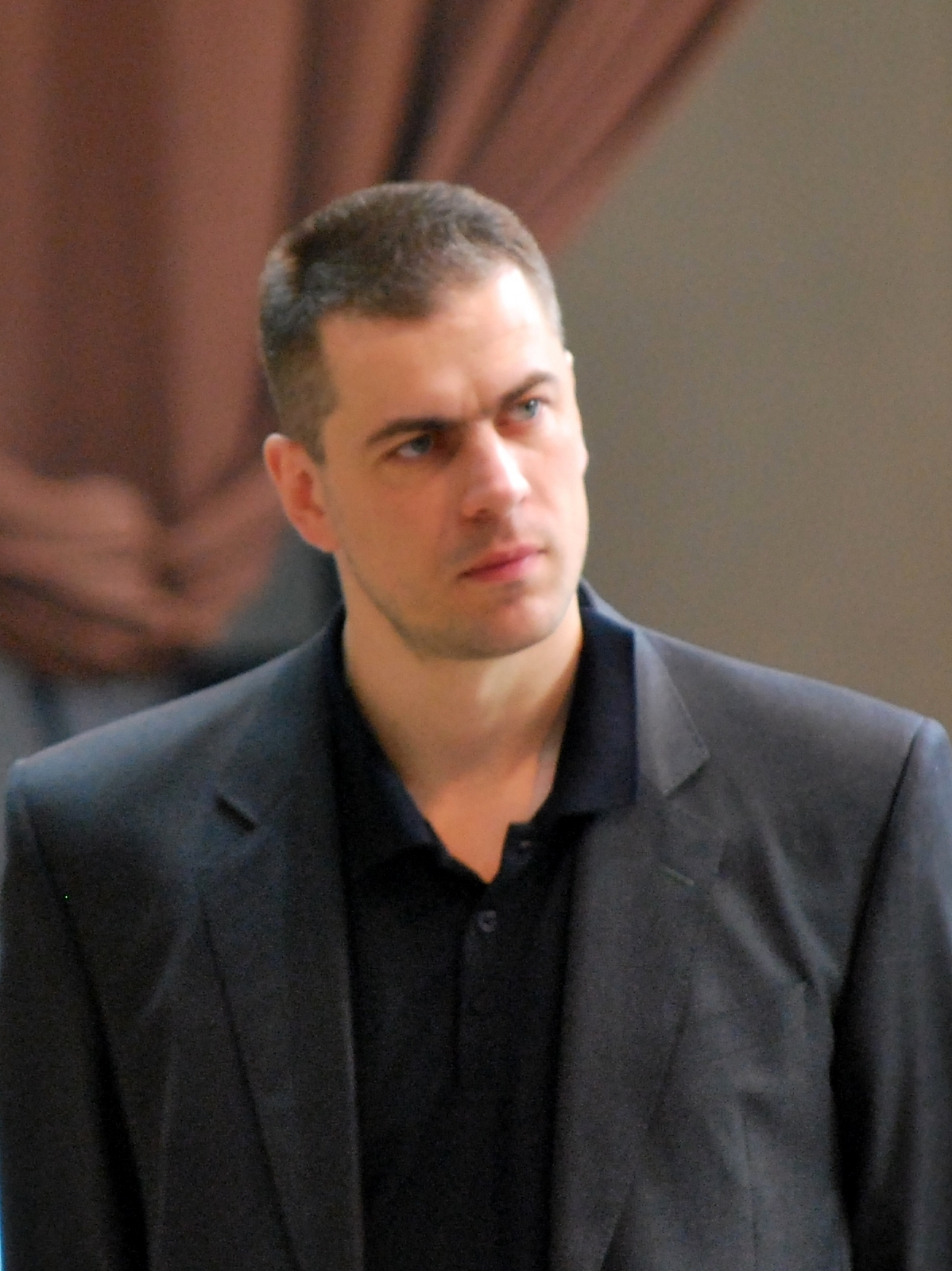
- Damian Dacewicz in 2011

Personal information
- Nationality: Polish
- Born: 28 September 1974 (age 50); Katowice, Poland

Sport
- Sport: Volleyball

Damian Dacewicz (born 28 September 1974) is a Polish former volleyball player. He competed in the men's tournament at the 1996 Summer Olympics.
