= Carlos Schwanke =

Brazilian volleyball player (born 1974)

Personal information
- Born: 5 May 1974 (age 50); Brusque, Brazil

Sport
- Sport: Volleyball

Carlos Schwanke (born 5 May 1974) is a Brazilian volleyball player. He competed in the men's tournament at the 1996 Summer Olympics.
