= Guillermo Quaini =

Argentine volleyball player (born 1971)

Personal information
- Nationality: Argentine
- Born: 6 November 1971 (age 54)

Sport
- Sport: Volleyball

Guillermo Quaini (born 6 November 1971) is an Argentine former volleyball player. He competed in the men's tournament at the 1996 Summer Olympics.
