= Nikolay Ivanov (volleyball) =

Bulgarian volleyball player (born 1972)

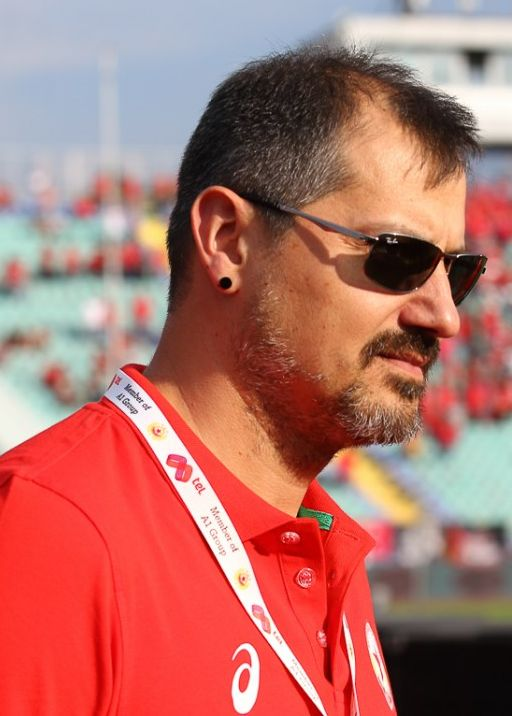

Personal information
- Full name: Nikolay Vassilev Ivanov
- Nationality: Bulgarian
- Born: 14 June 1972 (age 54)
- Height: 192 cm (6 ft 4 in)
- Weight: 93 kg (205 lb)
- Spike: 329 cm (130 in)
- Block: 323 cm (127 in)

Volleyball information
- Position: Setter
- Number: 12

Career
Years	Teams
2002	Arcelik

National team
2002	Bulgaria

Nikolay Vasilev Ivanov (Bulgarian: Николай Иванов; born 14 June 1972) is a retired Bulgarian male volleyball player.

Ivanov was a member of the Bulgarian team that came seventh at the 1996 Summer Olympics. He was the setter and the captain of the Bulgaria men's national volleyball team at the 2002 FIVB Volleyball Men's World Championship in Japan. He played for Arcelik.

== Clubs ==
- Arcelik (2002)
