= Stanislav Dineykin =

Russian volleyball player (born 1973)

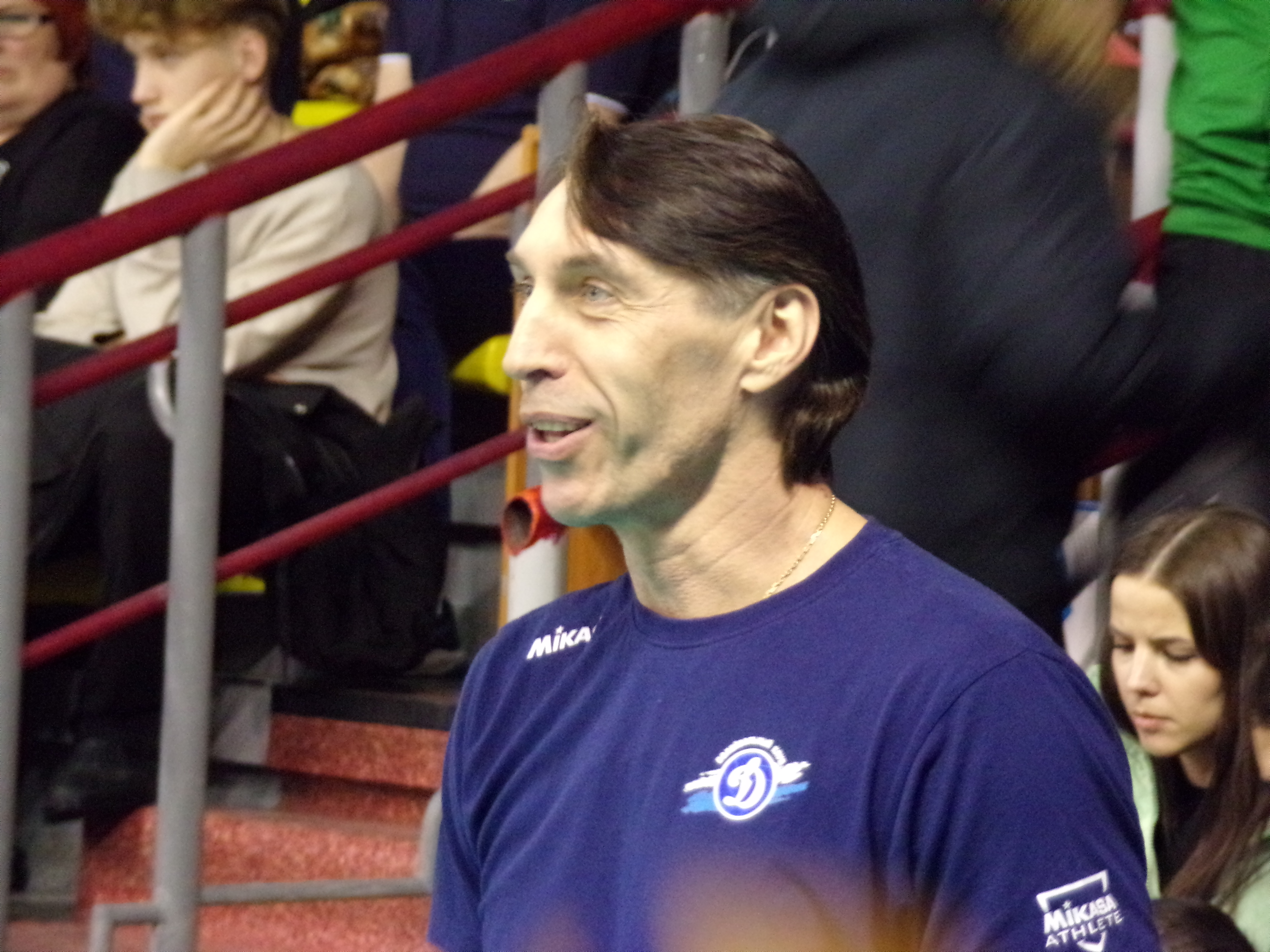

Personal information
- Full name: Stanislav Anatolevich Dineykin
- Nationality: Russian
- Born: 10 October 1973 (age 53); Blagodarny, Stavropol Krai, Russia
Medal record
Men's volleyball
Representing Russia
Olympic Games
Bronze medal – third place	2004 Athens	Team
World Cup
Gold medal – first place	1999 Japan	Team

Stanislav Anatolevich Dineykin (Russian: Станислав Анатольевич Динейкин, born 10 October 1973) is a Russian volleyball player who competed in the 1996 Summer Olympics and in the 2004 Summer Olympics.

He was born in Blagodarny, Stavropol Krai.

In 1996, he was part of the Russian team that finished fourth in the Olympic tournament. He played all eight matches.

Eight years later, he won the bronze medal with the Russian team in the 2004 Olympic tournament. He played all eight matches again.
