= Jeff Nygaard =

American volleyball player

Personal information
- Born: Jeff Wayne Nygaard; August 3, 1972 (age 54); Madison, Wisconsin, U.S.
- Height: 6 ft 8 in (203 cm)
- Education: University of California, Los Angeles

Volleyball information
- Position: Middle blocker
- Number: 13 (national team); 9 (UCLA)

National team
1993–2000	United States
Medal record
Representing United States
Men's beach volleyball
World Tour
Gold medal – first place	2003 Rhodes	Beach
Bronze medal – third place	2003 Marseille	Beach
Men's volleyball
World Championship
Bronze medal – third place	1994 Greece	Indoor

Jeff Wayne Nygaard OLY (born August 3, 1972) is an American volleyball coach and former volleyball player. He was a member of the United States national indoor team in the 1996 Summer Olympics in Atlanta and the 2000 Summer Olympics in Sydney. He was a middle blocker. He also played beach volleyball at the 2004 Summer Olympics in Athens with partner Dain Blanton.

== High school ==
Nygaard attended La Follette High School in Madison, Wisconsin, where he played volleyball and was MVP of his state in 1991. Nygaard helped La Follette win state championships in 1987 and 1989, and finish second in the state in 1988.

== College ==
Nygaard played college volleyball at UCLA and was named National Player of the Year in 1994 and 1995. He also won NCAA Championships while playing for the Bruins in 1993 and 1995, and was named NCAA Championship tournament Most Outstanding Player in 1995.

In 2007, Nygaard was inducted into the UCLA Hall of Fame.

== Beach volleyball ==
Nygaard played professional beach volleyball from 2001 to 2011, winning almost $500,000 in career earnings. In total, he won seven AVP tournaments and one FIVB tournament. In 2003, he was selected as the AVP Most Valuable Player.

== Coaching ==
Nygaard was an assistant coach for the Whittier College women's volleyball team in 2009. Nygaard is currently the head coach of the USC Trojans men's volleyball team.

== Awards ==
- Two-time NCAA Champion — 1993, 1995
- Two-time NCAA National Player of the Year — 1994, 1995
- FIVB World Championship bronze medal — 1994
- NCAA Championship Most Outstanding Player — 1995
- AVP Most Valuable Player — 2003
- UCLA Hall of Fame — 2007
