= Lyudmil Naydenov =

Bulgarian volleyball player (born 1970)

Personal information
- Nationality: Bulgarian
- Born: 4 September 1970 (age 56)
- Height: 194 cm (6 ft 4 in)

Volleyball information
- Number: 2 (national team)

Career
Years	Teams
1994	Olympiacos

National team
Bulgaria

Lyudmil Naydenov (Bulgarian: Людмил Найденов) (born 4 September 1970) is a Bulgarian former volleyball player. He was part of the Bulgaria men's national volleyball team at the 1994 FIVB Volleyball Men's World Championship and 1996 Summer Olympics. He played for Olympiacos in Greece.

== Clubs ==
- Olympiacos Piraeus (1994)
