= Petar Uzunov =

Bulgarian volleyball player (born 1971)

Personal information
- Nationality: Bulgarian
- Born: 19 January 1971 (age 55)
- Height: 198 cm (6 ft 6 in)

Volleyball information
- Number: 10 (national team)

Career
Years	Teams
1994	Panatinaikos Greece

National team
1994-1996	Bulgaria

Peter Uzunov (Bulgarian: Петър Узунов) (born 19 January 1971) is a former Bulgarian male volleyball player. He was part of the Bulgaria men's national volleyball team at the 1996 Summer Olympics. He played for Panatinaikos Greece.

== Clubs ==
- Panatinaikos Greece (1994)
