= Pablo Pereira (volleyball) =

Argentinian volleyball player

Personal information
- Born: 18 January 1974 (age 52); Buenos Aires, Argentina
- Height: 1.90 m (6 ft 3 in)

Volleyball information
- Position: Outside hitter
- Number: 12 (1996); 15 (2000)

National team
1994–2001	Argentina
Honours
Men's volleyball
Representing Argentina
Pan American Games
Gold medal – first place	1995 Mar del Plata	Team
CSV South American Championship
Silver medal – second place	1995 Porto Alegre
Silver medal – second place	1999 Córdoba
Bronze medal – third place	1997 Caracas

Pablo Pereira (born 18 January 1974) is an Argentine former volleyball player and two-time Olympian. Pereira competed at the 1996 Summer Olympics in Atlanta and the 2000 Summer Olympics in Sydney. He won a gold medal with the Argentine team at the 1995 Pan American Games in Mar del Plata.
