= Shin Young-chul =

South Korean volleyball player (born 1964)

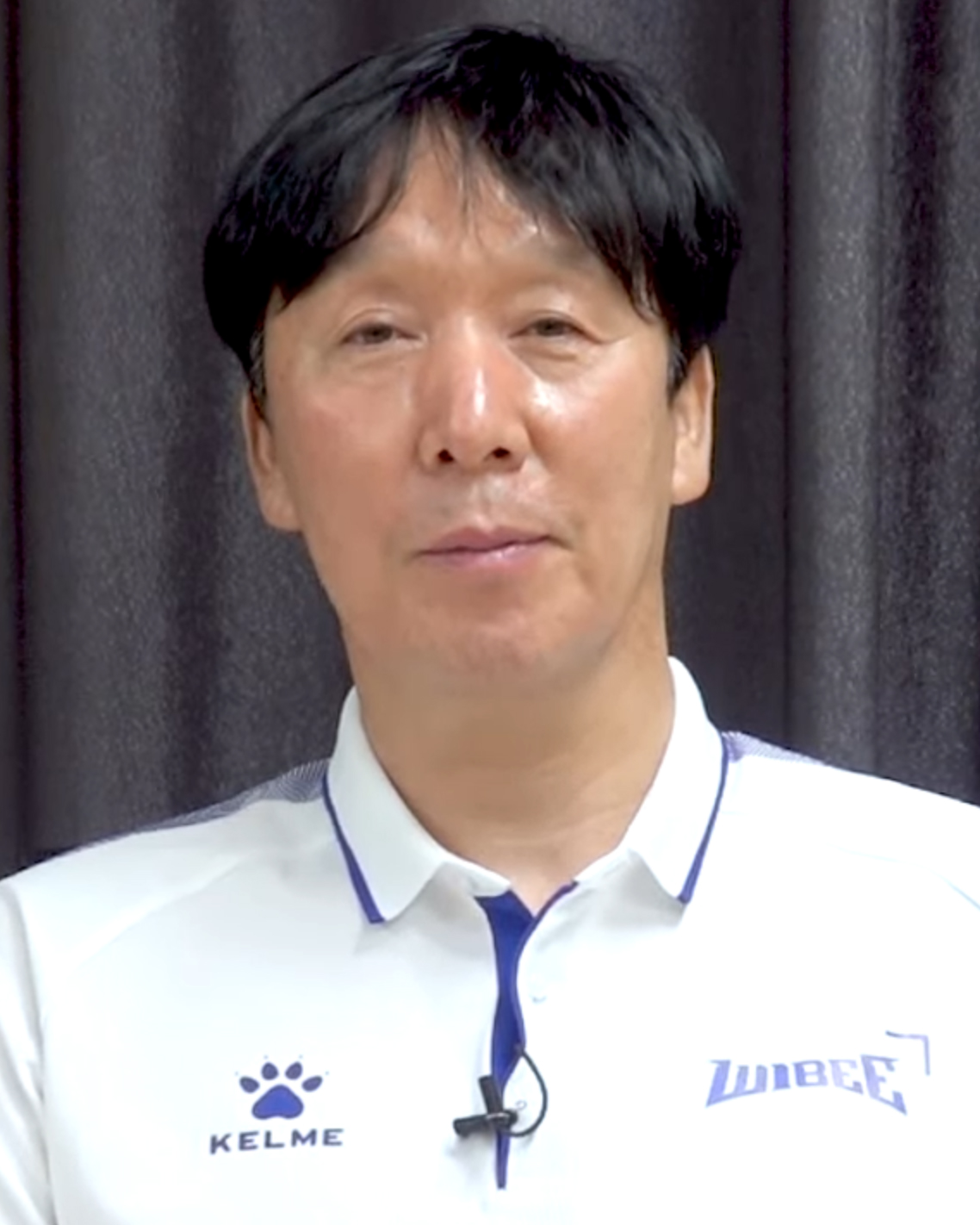
- Shin in 2020

Personal information
- Nationality: South Korean
- Born: 14 March 1964 (age 62); Uljin, North Gyeongsang
- Height: 179 cm (5 ft 10 in)
- Weight: 72 kg (159 lb)
- Education: Kyonggi University

Volleyball information
- Number: 10 (national team 1990); 5 (national team 1994)

Career
Years	Teams
1990; 1994	Armi; Kepco

National team
1990–1996	South Korea

- Shin Young-chul
- Hangul: 신영철
- Hanja: 申英哲
- RR: Sin Yeongcheol
- MR: Sin Yŏngch'ŏl

Shin Young-chul (Korean: 신영철; born 14 March 1964) is a former South Korean male volleyball player. He was part of the South Korea men's national volleyball team at the 1992 Summer Olympics and the 1996 Summer Olympics.1992 Summer Olympics He played for Kepco.

== Clubs ==
- Armi (1990)
- Kepco (1994)
