= Oleg Shatunov =

Russian volleyball player

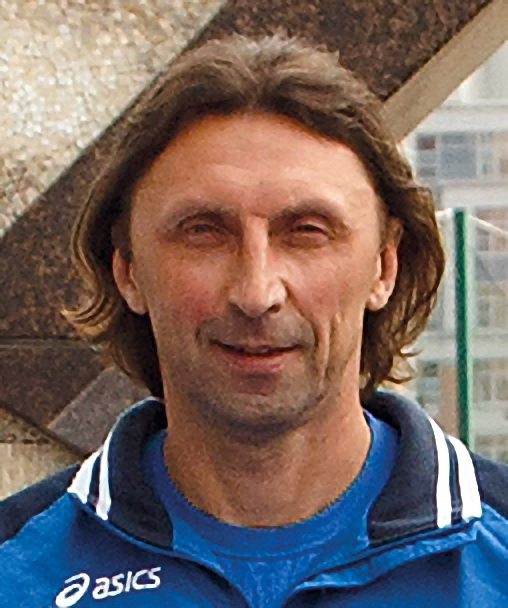

Personal information
- Nationality: Russian
- Born: 21 February 1967 (age 59); Yoshkar-Ola, Mari El, Russia (formerly Soviet Union)
- Height: 203 cm (6 ft 8 in)

Volleyball information
- Position: Middle blocker
- Number: 1 (national team)

Career
Years	Teams
1994	Hiroshima Japan

National team
1990–1991; 1992; 1993–1996	Soviet Union; CIS; Russia
Honours
Men's volleyball
Representing Soviet Union
World Championship
Bronze medal – third place	1990 Brazil	Team
FIVB World Cup
Gold medal – first place	1991 Japan
European Championship
Gold medal – first place	1991 Germany
Men's volleyball
Representing Russia
European Championship
Bronze medal – third place	1993 Finland

Oleg Shatunov (born 21 February 1967) is a former Russian male volleyball player. He was part of the Russia men's national volleyball team at the 1996 Summer Olympics in Atlanta. He played for the club team Hiroshima Japan.

== Clubs ==
- Hiroshima Japan (1994)
