= Alejandro Romano (volleyball) =

Argentine volleyball player (born 1974)

Personal information
- Nationality: Argentine
- Born: 4 May 1974 (age 52)

Sport
- Sport: Volleyball

Alejandro Romano (born 4 May 1974) is an Argentine former volleyball player. He competed in the men's tournament at the 1996 Summer Olympics.
