= Ivaylo Gavrilov =

Bulgarian volleyball player (born 1970)

Personal information
- Nationality: Bulgarian
- Born: 30 December 1970 (age 55)
- Height: 202 cm (6 ft 8 in)
- Weight: 93 kg (205 lb)

Career
Years	Teams
1990; 1994; 1996-97	Slavia; Moka Rica Forlì Italy; Olympiacos

National team
Bulgaria

Ivailo Gavrilov (Bulgarian: Ивайло Гаврилов) (born 30 December 1970) is a former Bulgarian male volleyball player. He was part of the Bulgaria men's national volleyball team at the 1996 Summer Olympics. He played for Olympiacos and Moka Rica Forlì Italy. His father was the former Bulgarian international volleyball player and coach Brunko Iliev.

== Clubs ==
- Slavia Bulgaria (1988-1991)
- Terme Acireale Scaini Italy (1991-92)
- Benfica, Portugal (1992-93)
- Pallavolo Catania Italy (1993-94)
- Moka Rica Forlì Italy (1994-95)
- Cariparma Parma Italy (1995-96)
- Roma Volley Italy* (1996*)
- Olympiacos (1996*-97)
- Mirabilandia Ravenna Italy (1997-98)
- Lube Banca Marche Macerata Italy (1998-99)
- Asystel Milano Italy (1999-2000)
- La Cascina Taranto Italy (2000-01)
- Sempre Volley Padova Italy (2001-02)
- PAOK Thessaloniki Greece (2002-03*)
- Marek Union Ivkoni Bulgaria (2002-03*)
- CSKA Sofia Bulgaria (2007)
