= Fernando Borrero =

Argentine volleyball player (born 1968)

Personal information
- Nationality: Argentine
- Born: 15 December 1968 (age 56)

Sport
- Sport: Volleyball

Fernando Borrero (born 15 December 1968) is an Argentine volleyball player. He competed in the men's tournament at the 1996 Summer Olympics in Atlanta.
