= Park Hee-sang =

South Korean volleyball player (born 1972)

Personal information
- Nationality: South Korean
- Born: 1 August 1972 (age 54); Incheon
- Height: 190 cm (6 ft 3 in)
- Education: Inha University

Volleyball information
- Number: 12 (national team)

Career
| Years | Teams |
|---|---|
| 1996–2003 | Korean Air |

National team
| 1994–2000 | South Korea |

- Park Hee-sang
- Hangul: 박희상
- Hanja: 朴喜相
- RR: Bak Huisang
- MR: Pak Hŭisang

Park Hee-sang (Korean: 박희상; born 1 August 1972) is a former South Korean male volleyball player. He was part of the South Korea men's national volleyball team. He played for Inha University. He competed with the national team at the 2000 Summer Olympics in Sydney, Australia, finishing 9th.

== Clubs ==
- Inha University (1994)
- Korean Air (1996–2003)

== See also ==
- South Korea at the 2000 Summer Olympics
