= Pavel Pimienta =

Cuban volleyball player (born 1976)

Personal information
- Full name: Pavel Noel Pimienta Allen
- Born: 3 August 1976 (age 50); Nuevitas, Cuba
- Height: 2.04 m (6 ft 8 in)

Volleyball information
- Position: Middle blocker
- Number: 8

National team
1997–2007	Cuba
Honours
Men's volleyball
Representing Cuba
World Championship
Bronze medal – third place	1998 Japan	Team
World League
Gold medal – first place	1998 Milan
Silver medal – second place	1997 Moscow
Silver medal – second place	1999 Mar del Plata
Bronze medal – third place	2005 Belgrade and Montenegro
World Grand Champions Cup
Gold medal – first place	2001 Japan	Team
Bronze medal – third place	1997 Japan
Pan American Games
Gold medal – first place	1999 Winnipeg	Team
Silver medal – second place	2003 San Domingo	Team
Bronze medal – third place	2007 Rio de Janeiro	Team
Central American and Caribbean Games
Gold medal – first place	1998 Maracaibo	Team
Silver medal – second place	2006 Cartagena	Team

Pavel Pimienta (born 3 August 1976) is a Cuban former volleyball player. Pimienta played for the Cuban men's national volleyball team at the 2000 Summer Olympics in Sydney. While representing Cuba, he won a bronze medal at the 1998 FIVB World Championship in Japan. He was a middle blocker.

== Honours ==
- 1997 FIVB World League — 2nd place
- 1998 FIVB World League — 1st place
- 1998 World Championship — 3rd place
- 1999 FIVB World League — 2nd place
- 1999 Pan American Games — 1st place
- 1999 FIVB World Cup — 2nd place
- 2000 FIVB World League — 8th place
- 2000 Olympic Games — 7th place
- 2001 FIVB World League — 5th place
- 2001 World Grand Champions Cup — 1st place
- 2001 America's Cup — 2nd place
- 2002 FIVB World League — 13th place
- 2002 World Championship — 19th place
- 2003 FIVB World League — 13th place
- 2003 Pan American Games — 2nd place
- 2005 America's Cup — 3rd place
- 2007 NORCECA Championship — 3rd place
