= Iván Ruiz =

Cuban volleyball player

Iván Benito Ruíz Cuesta
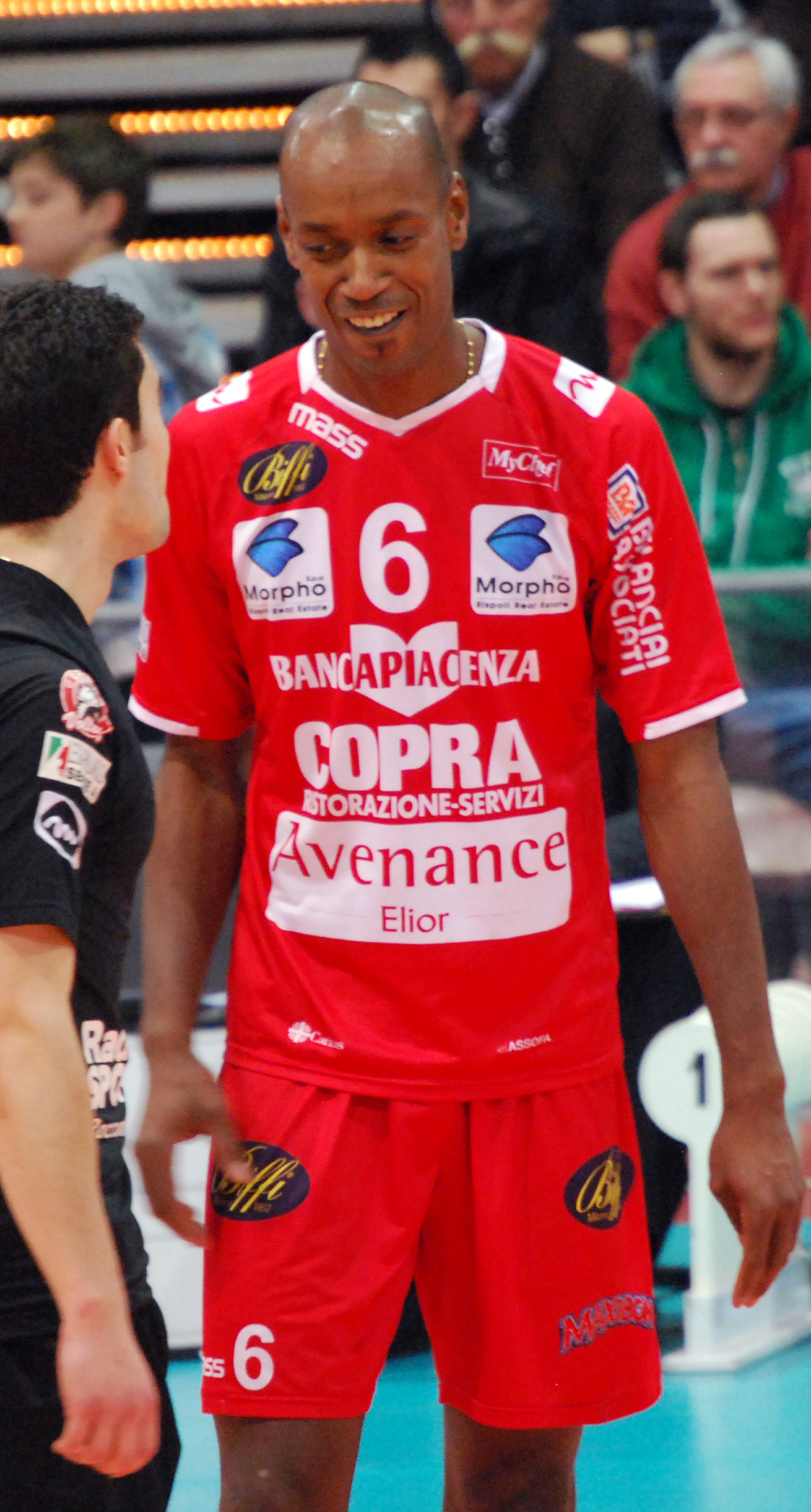

Personal information
- Full name: Iván Benito Ruiz Cuesta
- Born: 26 March 1977 (age 49); Camagüey, Cuba
- Height: 1.95 m (6 ft 5 in)

Volleyball information
- Position: Outside hitter
- Number: 6

National team
| 1997–2002 | Cuba |
Honours
Men's volleyball
Representing Cuba
World League
| Gold medal – first place | 1998 Milan |
| Silver medal – second place | 1997 Moscow |
| Silver medal – second place | 1999 Mar del Plata |
World Grand Champions Cup
| Gold medal – first place | 2001 Japan | Team |
| Bronze medal – third place | 1997 Japan |
Pan American Games
| Gold medal – first place | 1999 Winnipeg | Team |
Central American and Caribbean Games
| Gold medal – first place | 1998 Maracaibo | Team |

Iván Benito Ruiz Cuesta (born 26 March 1977), more commonly known as Iván Ruiz, is a retired volleyball player from Cuba. A one-time Olympian (2000), he played as an outside hitter and won a gold medal with the Cuban men's national volleyball team at the 1999 Pan American Games in Winnipeg. He also helped Cuba win the gold medal at the 2001 World Grand Champions Cup in Japan.

== Honours ==
- 1997 FIVB World League — 2nd place
- 1998 FIVB World League — 1st place
- 1999 FIVB World League — 2nd place
- 2000 FIVB World League — 8th place
- 2000 Olympic Games — 7th place
- 2001 FIVB World League — 5th place
- 2001 World Grand Champions Cup — 1st place
- 2002 FIVB World League — 13th place
