= Ihosvany Hernández =

Cuban volleyball player (born 1972)

Personal information
- Full name: Ihosvany Hernández Rivera
- Born: 6 August 1972 (age 54); Havana, Cuba
- Height: 2.06 m (6 ft 9 in)
- Weight: 90 kg (198 lb)

Volleyball information
- Position: Middle blocker
- Number: 14

Career
Years	Teams
1989–1990	Ciudad de Habana

National team
1989–2001	Cuba
Honours
Men's volleyball
Representing Cuba
World Championship
Silver medal – second place	1990 Brazil	Team
Bronze medal – third place	1998 Japan	Team
FIVB World Cup
Gold medal – first place	1989 Japan
Silver medal – second place	1991 Japan
World League
Gold medal – first place	1998 Milan
Silver medal – second place	1994 Milan
Silver medal – second place	1997 Moscow
Silver medal – second place	1999 Mar del Plata
World Grand Champions Cup
Gold medal – first place	2001 Japan	Team
Bronze medal – third place	1997 Japan
Pan American Games
Gold medal – first place	1991 Havana	Team
Gold medal – first place	1999 Winnipeg	Team
Bronze medal – third place	1995 Mar del Plata	Team
Central American and Caribbean Games
Gold medal – first place	1998 Maracaibo	Team

Ihosvany Hernández Rivera (born 6 August 1972), more commonly known as Ihosvany Hernández, is a Cuban former volleyball player and three-time Olympian. Hernández played with the Cuban men's national volleyball team at the 1992 Summer Olympics in Barcelona, the 1996 Summer Olympics in Atlanta, and the 2000 Summer Olympics in Sydney. He was the captain of the Cuban team at the Sydney Olympics. Standing at 2.06 meters (6'9") in height, he was a middle blocker.

== World Cups and World Championships ==
Playing for the Cuban national team, Hernández won a gold medal at the 1989 FIVB World Cup in Japan, a silver medal at the 1990 FIVB World Championship in Brazil, a silver medal at the 1991 FIVB World Cup in Japan, and a bronze medal at the 1998 FIVB World Championship in Japan.

== Pan American Games ==
Hernández also helped the Cuban national team win gold medals at the 1991 Pan American Games in Havana and 1999 Pan American Games in Winnipeg, and the bronze medal at the 1995 Pan American Games in Mar del Plata.

== 2001 Defection ==
In 2001, Hernández was one of six players on the Cuban men's national volleyball team to leave a hotel they stayed at in Flanders for a tournament, and from there rode a train to Italy for political asylum. The other players were Leonel Marshall, Jorge Luis Hernández, Ángel Dennis, Yasser Romero, and Ramón Gato. Once they were granted asylum in Italy, this group was referred to as "the defectors".

== Clubs ==
- Ciudad de Habana (1989–1990)
