= Yosenki García =

Cuban volleyball player

Personal information
- Full name: Yosenki García Diaz
- Nationality: Cuban
- Born: 17 January 1976 (age 50)
- Height: 2.00 m (6 ft 7 in)

Volleyball information
- Position: Middle blocker
- Number: 16

National team
- Years: Team
- 1998–2002: Cuba
Honours
Men's volleyball
Representing Cuba
World Championship
Bronze medal – third place	1998 Japan	Team
World League
Gold medal – first place	1998 Milan
Silver medal – second place	1999 Mar del Plata
World Grand Champions Cup
Gold medal – first place	2001 Japan	Team
Pan American Games
Gold medal – first place	1999 Winnipeg	Team
Central American and Caribbean Games
Gold medal – first place	1998 Maracaibo	Team

Yosenki García (born 17 January 1976) is a Cuban former volleyball player. He was part of the Cuban men's national volleyball team. He competed with the national team at the 2000 Summer Olympics in Sydney, finishing seventh. He helped Cuba win the gold medal at the 1999 Pan American Games in Winnipeg.

== See also ==
- Cuba at the 2000 Summer Olympics
