= Raúl Diago =

Cuban volleyball player (born 1967)

Personal information
- Full name: Raúl Diago Izquierdo
- Born: 1 August 1967 (age 59); Matanzas, Cuba
- Height: 1.93 m (6 ft 4 in)
- Weight: 80 kg (176 lb)

Volleyball information
- Position: Setter
- Number: 9

Career
Teams
| | Matanzas |

National team
| 1987–2001 | Cuba |
Honours
Men's volleyball
Representing Cuba
World Championship
| Silver medal – second place | 1990 Brazil | Team |
| Bronze medal – third place | 1998 Japan | Team |
FIVB World Cup
| Gold medal – first place | 1989 Japan |
| Silver medal – second place | 1991 Japan |
World League
| Gold medal – first place | 1998 Milan |
| Silver medal – second place | 1992 Genoa |
| Silver medal – second place | 1994 Milan |
| Silver medal – second place | 1997 Moscow |
| Silver medal – second place | 1999 Mar del Plata |
World Grand Champions Cup
| Bronze medal – third place | 1997 Japan |
Goodwill Games
| Bronze medal – third place | 1990 Seattle |
Pan American Games
| Gold medal – first place | 1991 Havana | Team |
| Gold medal – first place | 1999 Winnipeg | Team |
| Silver medal – second place | 1987 Indianapolis | Team |
| Bronze medal – third place | 1995 Mar de Plata | Team |
Central American and Caribbean Games
| Gold medal – first place | 1998 Maracaibo | Team |

Raúl Diago Izquierdo (born 1 August 1967), more commonly known as Raúl Diago, is a retired volleyball player from Cuba. A three-time Olympian (1992, 1996, and 2000), he was honoured as the "best setter" at the 1998 FIVB World Championship in Japan, where Cuba won the bronze medal.

Diago also helped Cuba to the silver medal at the 1990 FIVB World Championship in Brazil, and to gold medals at the 1991 and 1999 Pan American Games.

== Honours ==
- 1987 Pan American Games — 2nd place
- 1990 World Championship — 2nd place
- 1990 Goodwill Games — 3rd place
- 1991 FIVB World League — 2nd place
- 1991 Pan American Games — 1st place
- 1992 Summer Olympics — 4th place
- 1994 FIVB World League — 2nd place
- 1995 FIVB World League — 3rd place
- 1995 Pan American Games — 3rd place
- 1996 Summer Olympics — 6th place
- 1997 FIVB World League — 2nd place
- 1998 FIVB World League — 1st place
- 1998 Central American and Caribbean Games — 1st place
- 1998 World Championship — 3rd place
- 1999 FIVB World League — 2nd place
- 1999 Pan American Games — 1st place
- 2000 Summer Olympics — 7th place

== Individual awards ==
- 1992 FIVB World League "Best Setter"
- 1998 FIVB World Championship "Best Setter"
