= Ángel Dennis =

Italian volleyball player

Ángel Dennis Díaz
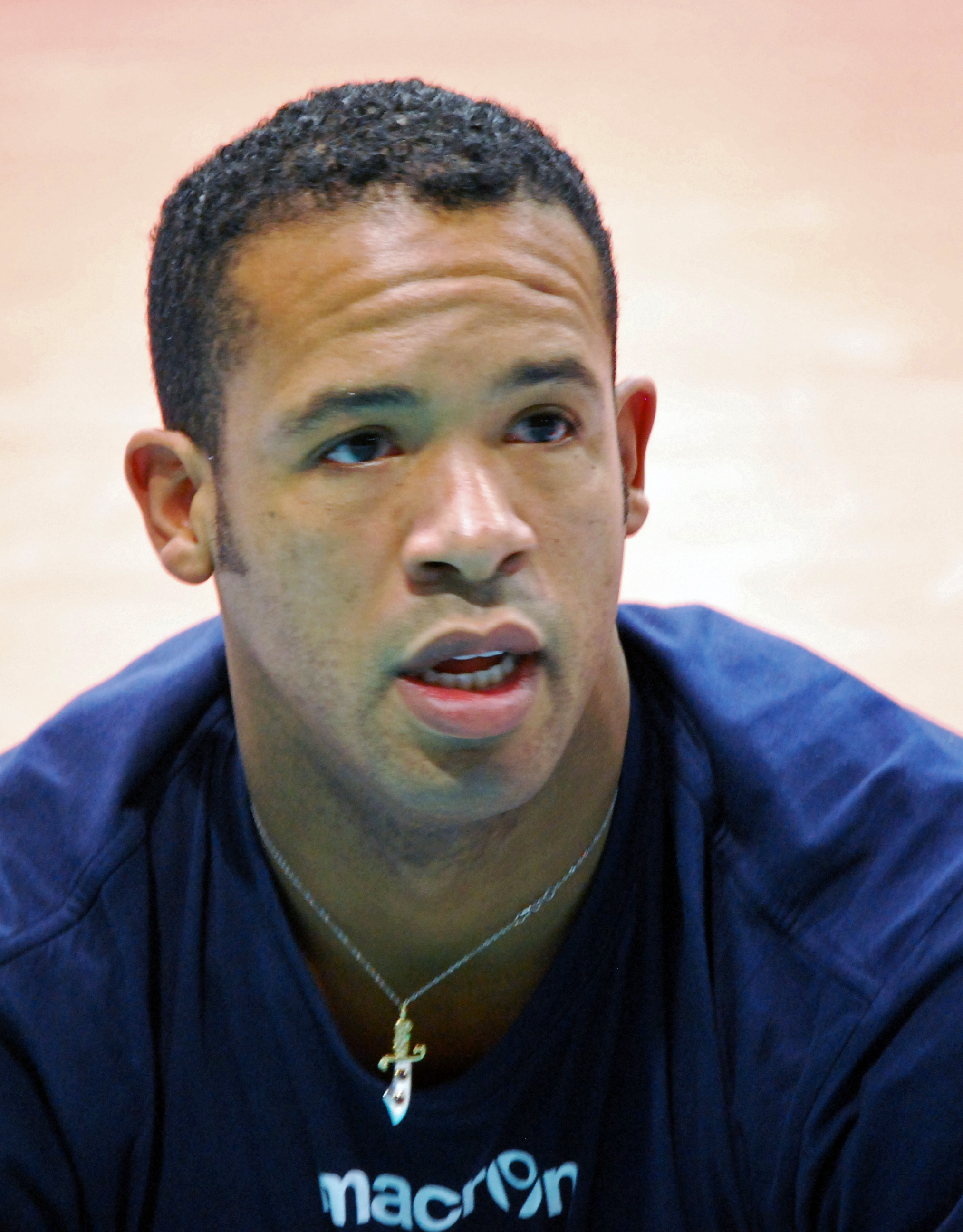
- Ángel Dennis during a volleyball match in Piacenza.

Personal information
- Full name: Ángel Dennis
- Nationality: Cuban; Italian
- Born: 13 June 1977 (age 49) Havana, Cuba
- Height: 1.93 m (6 ft 4 in)
- Weight: 89 kg (196 lb)

Volleyball information
- Position: Outside hitter / Opposite
- Current club: VOA/Morro da Fumaça
- Number: 7 (club); 7 (national team)

Career
- Years: Team
- 1998–2000 2003 2004 2004–2007 2007–2012 2012–2013 2013 2013–2016 2016 2016 2016–2017 2017–2020 2020–2022 2021–2022 2022–2023 2023–2024: Palermo Volley; Playeros de San Juan; ICOM Latina; Lube Banca Macerata; Cimone Modena; Club Ciudad de Bolívar; Anwar Club; APAV Canoas; Anwar Club; Revivre Milano; Lupi Santa Croce; Sporting CP; Pallavolo Macerata; Al Jazira Sport Club; Enosis Neon Paralimni; VOA/Morro da Fumaça

National team
- Years: Team
- 1996–2001: Cuba (212)
Honours
Representing Cuba
Men's volleyball
World Championship
Bronze medal – third place	1998 Japan
World Grand Champions Cup
Gold medal – first place	2001 Japan	Team
Bronze medal – third place	1997 Japan
World League
Gold medal – first place	1998 Milan
Silver medal – second place	1997 Moscow
Silver medal – second place	1999 Mar del Plata
Pan American Games
Gold medal – first place	1999 Winnipeg	Team
NORCECA Championship
Gold medal – first place	1997 Canada
Gold medal – first place	2001 Barbados
Central American and Caribbean Games
Gold medal – first place	1998 Maracaibo	Team
- Updated on 26 October 2023

Ángel Dennis (born 13 June 1977) is a Cuban-born Italian volleyball player. Dennis played with the Cuban men's national volleyball team at the 2000 Summer Olympics in Sydney, where he finished in seventh place. He was widely regarded as the most talented player on the Cuban men's team. He helped the Cuban team win the bronze medal at the 1998 FIVB World Championship in Japan.

== Club volleyball ==
Dennis played for IVECO Palermo from 1998 to 2000. After a period of inactivity, Dennis returned to play in 2003-2004 for Latina Volley, before moving to Lube Banca Marche Macerata the following year, after a short stint in Qatar. With Lube he won a top national division and an Italian Supercup in 2006, and two CEV Cups (2005–2006). In 2017, Dennis signed a contract with Sporting CP.

== 2001 Defection ==
In 2001, Dennis was one of six players on the Cuban men's national volleyball team to leave a hotel they stayed at in Flanders for a tournament, and from there rode a train to Italy for political asylum. The other players were Leonel Marshall, Jorge Luis Hernández, Ihosvany Hernández, Yasser Romero, and Ramón Gato. Once they were granted asylum in Italy, this group was referred to as "the defectors".

== Personal life ==
Dennis married Italian volleyball player Simona Rinieri.
