= André Heller (volleyball) =

Brazilian volleyball player (born 1975)

Personal information
- Born: 17 December 1975 (age 50); Novo Hamburgo, Brazil
- Height: 1.99 m (6 ft 6 in)
- Weight: 93 kg (205 lb)
- Spike: 339 cm (133 in)
- Block: 321 cm (126 in)

Volleyball information
- Position: Middle blocker
- Current club: Retired

National team
| 1998–2008 | Brazil |
Honours
Men's volleyball
Representing Brazil
| Event | 1st | 2nd | 3rd |
|---|---|---|---|
| Olympic Games | 1 | 1 | 0 |
| World Championship | 1 | 0 | 0 |
| World Cup | 2 | 0 | 0 |
| World Grand Champions Cup | 1 | 1 | 0 |
| World League | 6 | 1 | 2 |
| Pan American Games | 1 | 1 | 1 |
| Total | 12 | 4 | 3 |
Olympic Games
| Gold medal – first place | 2004 Athens | Team |
| Silver medal – second place | 2008 Beijing | Team |
World Championship
| Gold medal – first place | 2006 Japan | Team |
World Cup
| Gold medal – first place | 2003 Japan | Team |
| Gold medal – first place | 2007 Japan | Team |
World Grand Champions Cup
| Gold medal – first place | 2005 Japan | Team |
| Silver medal – second place | 2001 Japan | Team |
World League
| Gold medal – first place | 2001 Katowice | |
| Gold medal – first place | 2003 Madrid | |
| Gold medal – first place | 2004 Rome | |
| Gold medal – first place | 2005 Belgrade | |
| Gold medal – first place | 2006 Moscow | |
| Gold medal – first place | 2007 Katowice | |
| Silver medal – second place | 2002 Belo Horizonte | |
| Bronze medal – third place | 1999 Mar del Plata | |
| Bronze medal – third place | 2000 Rotterdam | |
Pan American Games
| Gold medal – first place | 2007 Rio de Janeiro | Team |
| Silver medal – second place | 1999 Winnipeg | Team |
| Bronze medal – third place | 2003 Santo Domingo | Team |

André Heller (born 17 December 1975) is a Brazilian former volleyball player. A three-time Olympian (2000, 2004 and 2008), he played as a middle-blocker. He won the gold medal with the men's national team at the 2003 FIVB Men's World Cup in Japan and at the 2004 Summer Olympics in Athens, Greece.

After the 2013–2014 season, he retired from professional volleyball at the age of 38.

== Honours ==
- 1998 FIVB World League — 5th place
- 1998 World Championship — 4th place
- 1999 FIVB World League — 3rd place
- 2000 FIVB World League — 3rd place
- 2000 Olympic Games — 6th place
- 2001 FIVB World League — 1st place
- 2001 World Grand Champions Cup — 2nd place
- 2002 FIVB World League — 2nd place
- 2003 FIVB World League — 1st place
- 2003 FIVB World Cup — 1st place
- 2003 Pan American Games — 3rd place
- 2005 FIVB World League — 1st place
- 2005 America's Cup — 2nd place
- 2006 FIVB World League — 1st place
- 2006 World Championship — 1st place
- 2007 FIVB World League — 1st place
