= Alexeis Argilagos =

Cuban volleyball player (1975–2026)

Personal information
- Full name: Alexeis Argilagos Segura
- Nationality: Cuban
- Born: 28 July 1975; Camagüey, Cuba
- Died: 1 August 2026 (aged 51); Italy
- Height: 2.00 m (6 ft 7 in)

Volleyball information
- Position: Libero
- Number: 5

National team
1995–2000	Cuba
Honours
Men's volleyball
Representing Cuba
World Championship
Bronze medal – third place	1998 Japan	Team
World League
Gold medal – first place	1998 Milan
Silver medal – second place	1999 Mar del Plata
World Grand Champions Cup
Bronze medal – third place	1997 Japan
Pan American Games
Gold medal – first place	1999 Winnipeg	Team
Central American and Caribbean Games
Gold medal – first place	1998 Maracaibo	Team

Alexeis Argilagos Segura (28 July 1975 – 1 August 2026) was a Cuban volleyball player.

== Biography ==
Argilagos was born in Camagüey. He played for the Cuban men's national volleyball team between 1995 and 2000. He was part of the Cuban team that won the 1998 World League, as well as a silver medal in the 1999 World League, bronze in the 1997 World Grand Champions Cup, and gold at the 1999 Pan American Games. He competed with the national team at the 2000 Summer Olympics in Sydney, finishing seventh.

He left the national team after the 2000 Summer Olympics and settled in Italy, playing for several clubs of the Italian Serie A2, including Salerno, Isernia, Mantova, Materdomini Castellana Grotte, Sora, and Segrate. He also played with the Qatari club Al-Arabi in 2003–2006. He retired in the 2021–22 season.

Argilagos died of a brain tumour in Italy, on 1 August 2026, at the age of 51.

== See also ==
- Cuba at the 2000 Summer Olympics
