= Osvaldo Hernández =

Cuban volleyball player (born 1970)

Osvaldo Hernández Chambert
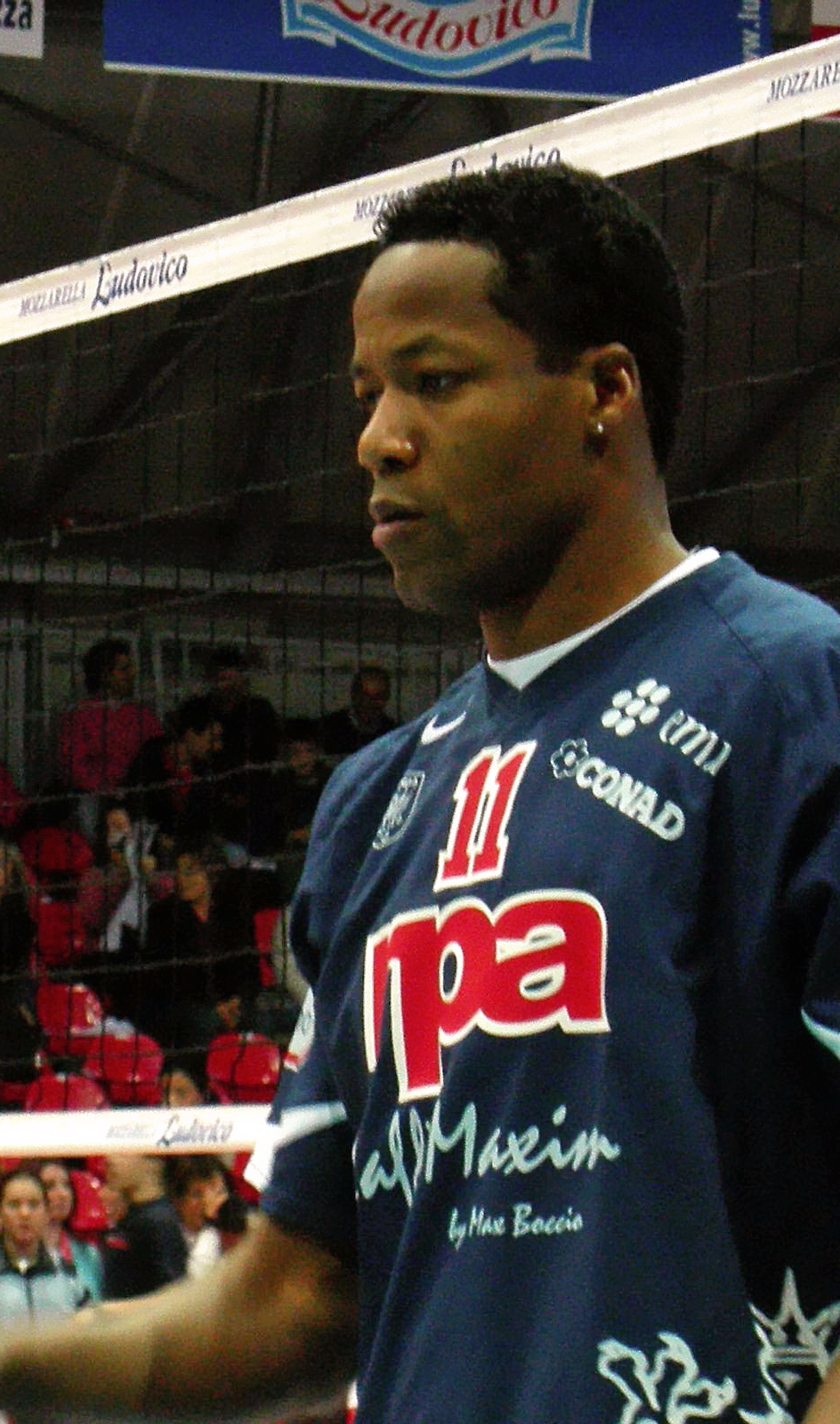
- Osvaldo Hernández

Personal information
- Full name: Osvaldo Hernández Chambert
- Born: 11 July 1970 (age 56); Camagüey, Cuba
- Height: 2.02 m (6 ft 8 in)

Volleyball information
- Position: Opposite
- Number: 11

National team
1992–2000	Cuba
Honours
Men's volleyball
Representing Cuba
World Championship
Bronze medal – third place	1998 Japan	Team
World League
Gold medal – first place	1998 Milan
Silver medal – second place	1994 Milan
Silver medal – second place	1997 Moscow
Silver medal – second place	1999 Mar del Plata
World Grand Champions Cup
Bronze medal – third place	1997 Japan
Pan American Games
Gold medal – first place	1999 Winnipeg	Team
Bronze medal – third place	1995 Mar del Plata	Team
Central American and Caribbean Games
Gold medal – first place	1998 Maracaibo	Team

Osvaldo Hernández Chambert (born 11 July 1970, in Camagüey), more commonly known as Osvaldo Hernández, is a retired Italian volleyball player originally from Cuba.

In Italy, Hernández won the scudetto (top division title) in 2000 with Piaggio Roma. With the Cuban national team, he won a World League in 1998. He played for Cuba in three Olympic Games from 1992 to 2000.

== Individual awards ==
- 1995 FIVB Volleyball World League"Best Blocker-Intercontinental Round"
- 1998 FIVB Volleyball World League"Best Scorer"
- 1998 FIVB Volleyball World League"Best Spiker"
- 1998 FIVB Volleyball World League"Most Valuable Player"
- 1999 FIVB Volleyball World Cup"Best Server"
- 1999 Italian League "Best Spiker"
- 2000 Italian League "Best Server"
- 2000 Men's Olympic Volleyball"Best Server"
