= Rodolfo Sánchez =

Cuban volleyball player

Personal information
- Full name: Rodolfo Luis Sánchez
- Born: 27 May 1969 (age 57); Pinar del Rio, Cuba
- Height: 1.97 m (6 ft 6 in)

Volleyball information
- Position: Outside hitter
- Number: 8

Career
| Years | Teams |
|---|---|
| 1995–96 | Olympiacos S.C. |

National team
| 1990–2001 | Cuba |
Honours
Men's volleyball
Representing Cuba
World Championship
| Silver medal – second place | 1990 Brazil | Team |
| Bronze medal – third place | 1998 Japan | Team |
FIVB World Cup
| Silver medal – second place | 1991 Japan |
World League
| Gold medal – first place | 1998 Milan |
| Silver medal – second place | 1994 Milan |
| Silver medal – second place | 1999 Mar del Plata |
World Grand Champions Cup
| Bronze medal – third place | 1993 Japan |
Pan American Games
| Gold medal – first place | 1991 Havana | Team |
| Bronze medal – third place | 1995 Mar del Plata | Team |
Central American and Caribbean Games
| Gold medal – first place | 1998 Maracaibo | Team |

Rodolfo Sánchez (born 27 May 1969) is a Cuban former volleyball player and coach. He was part of the Cuban men's national volleyball team at the 1992 and 1996 Summer Olympics. He played for Greek powerhouse Olympiacos S.C., with whom he won the 1996 CEV Cup Winners' Cup.

== Coaching ==
After Sánchez's retirement, he became head coach of Cuba men's national volleyball team.

== Clubs ==
- Olympiacos S.C. (1995–96)
- Surabaya Samator (2004–25)
