= Leonel Marshall Jr. =

Cuban volleyball player (born 1979)

Leonel Marshall
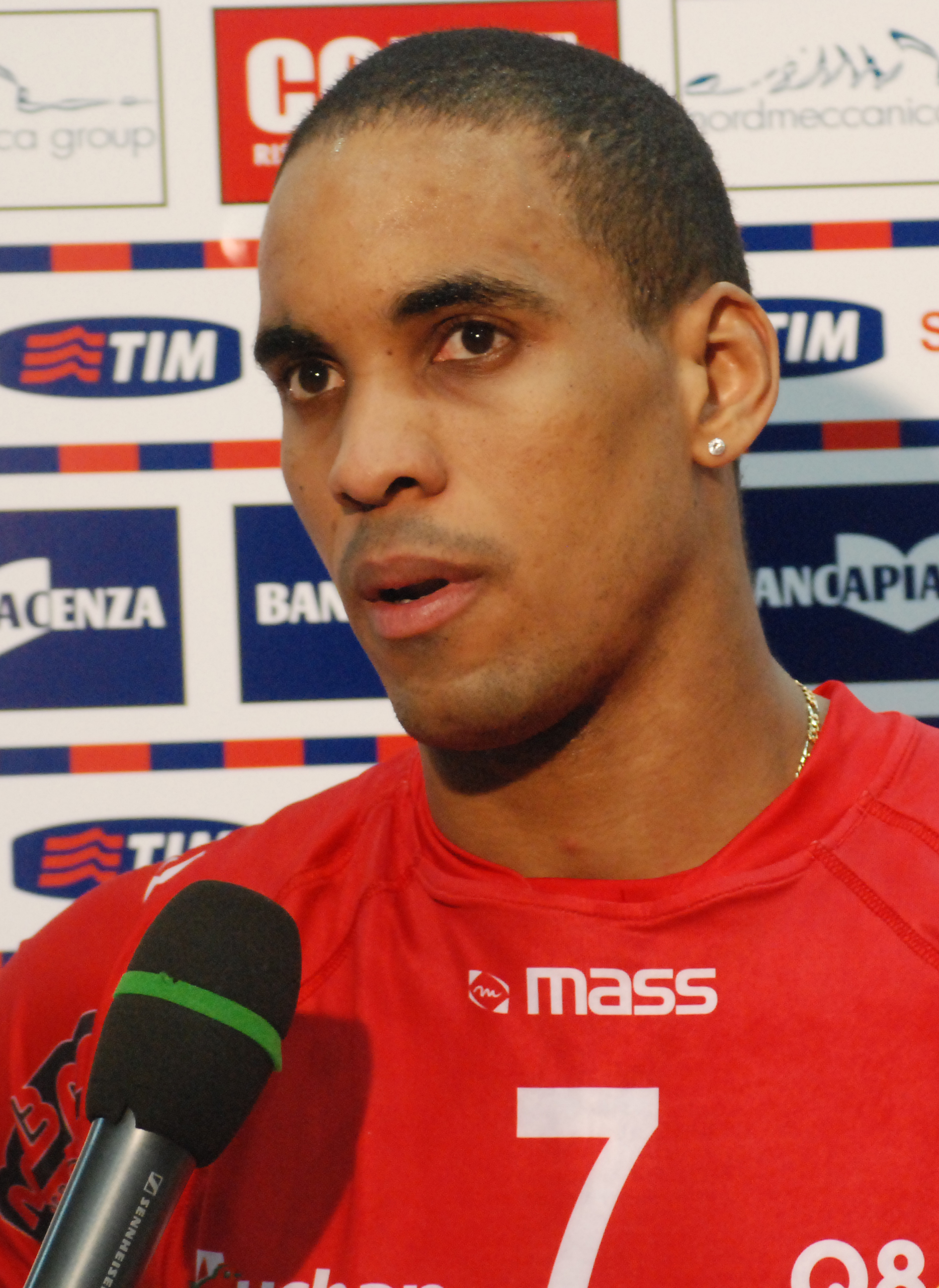

Personal information
- Full name: Leonel Marshall Borges Jr.
- Born: 25 September 1979 (age 47); Havana, Cuba
- Height: 1.96 m (6 ft 5 in)
- Weight: 86 kg (190 lb)
- Spike: 383 cm (151 in)
- Block: 343 cm (135 in)

Volleyball information
- Position: Outside hitter
- Current club: Sieco Service Ortona
- Number: 1 (national team); 7 (club volleyball)

Career
| Years | Teams |
|---|---|
| 1998–2000; 2001–2002; 2003–2007; 2007–2008; 2008–2010; 2010–2014; 2014–2015; 2015–2016; 2016–2018; 2018–2019; 2019–2020; 2020–2021; 2022–2024 | Sarplast Livorno; Nazionale Cubana; Pallavolo Piacenza; M. Roma Volley; Pallavolo Piacenza; Fenerbahçe Istanbul; Arkas Izmir; BAIC Group; LPR Piacenza; Sporting Clube de Portugal; Bursa Büyükşehir Belediyespor; Asswehly Sports Club; Sieco Service Ortona |

National team
| 1997–2001 | Cuba |
Honours
Men's volleyball
Representing Cuba
World Grand Champions Cup
| Gold medal – first place | 2001 Japan | Team |
World League
| Silver medal – second place | 1999 Mar del Plata |
Pan American Games
| Gold medal – first place | 1999 Winnipeg | Team |
NORCECA Championship
| Gold medal – first place | 2001 Barbados |
- Last updated: 24 October 2023

Leonel Marshall Borges Jr. (Note: In this Spanish name, the first or paternal surname is Marshall and the second or maternal family name is Borges.) (born 25 September 1979), more commonly known as Leonel Marshall, is a Cuban professional volleyball player. Marshall is an outside hitter, and is well known for his outstanding vertical jump. He helped the Cuban men's national volleyball team win the gold medal at the 1999 Pan American Games in Winnipeg. He was the youngest member of the Cuban national team at the 2000 Olympics in Sydney, where he finished in seventh place.

== Club volleyball ==
Marshall has played for numerous European club teams such as M. Roma Volley, Pallavolo Piacenza, and Fenerbahçe. Currently he is playing for Sieco Service Ortona.

== 2001 Defection ==
In 2001, Marshall was one of six players on the Cuban national team to leave a hotel they stayed at in Flanders for a tournament, and from there rode a train to Italy for political asylum. The other players were Ihosvany Hernández, Jorge Luis Hernández, Ángel Dennis, Yasser Romero, and Ramón Gato. Once they were granted asylum in Italy, this group was referred to as "the defectors".

== Personal life ==
Marshall is the son of retired Cuban volleyball player Leonel Marshall Sr., who competed in both the 1976 Summer Olympics and 1980 Summer Olympics.

== Achievements ==
=== Honors ===
- CEV Cup runner up with Pallavolo Piacenza: 2004, 2007
- CEV Top Teams Cup winner with Pallavolo Piacenza: 2006
- Italian Championship winner with Pallavolo Piacenza: 2009
- Italian Championship runner up with Pallavolo Piacenza: 2004, 2007
- Turkish Championship winner with Fenerbahçe: 2010–11, 2011–12
- Turkish Volleyball Cup winner with Fenerbahçe: 2011–12
- Turkish Volleyball Super Cup winner with Fenerbahçe: 2011–12
- CEV Challenge Cup winner with Fenerbahçe: 2013–14

=== Individual ===
- World League 2001: "Best service"
- Cuban sports 2002: "Talented player award"
- CEV Cup 2005–06: "MVP"
- Turkey League 2010–11: "MVP"
- Turkey League 2010–11: "Best receiver"
- Turkey League 2013–14: "Best receiver"
- Turkey League 2014–15: "Best receiver"
