= Ramón Gato =

Cuban volleyball player (born 1973)

Personal information
- Full name: Ramón Ismael Gato Moya
- Born: 16 November 1973 (age 53) Camagüey, Cuba
- Height: 1.93 m (6 ft 4 in)
- Weight: 80 kg (176 lb)

Volleyball information
- Position: Outside hitter
- Number: 12

National team
- Years: Team
- 1994–2001: Cuba
Honours
Men's volleyball
Representing Cuba
World Championship
Bronze medal – third place	1998 Japan	Team
World League
Gold medal – first place	1998 Milan
Silver medal – second place	1997 Moscow
World Grand Champions Cup
Gold medal – first place	2001 Japan	Team
Bronze medal – third place	1997 Japan
Pan American Games
Bronze medal – third place	1995 Mar del Plata	Team
Central American and Caribbean Games
Gold medal – first place	1998 Maracaibo	Team

Ramón Gato (born 16 November 1973) is a Cuban former volleyball player who played for the Cuban men's national volleyball team. Gato competed with the national team at the 2000 Summer Olympics in Sydney, finishing seventh. He won bronze medals with the Cuban team at the 1995 Pan American Games in Mar del Plata and the 1998 FIVB World Championship in Japan.

== 2001 Defection ==
In 2001, Gato was one of six players on the Cuban men's national volleyball team to leave a hotel they stayed at in Flanders for a tournament, and from there rode a train to Italy for political asylum. The other players were Leonel Marshall, Jorge Luis Hernández, Ihosvany Hernández, Ángel Dennis, and Yasser Romero. Once they were granted asylum in Italy, this group was referred to as "the defectors".

== See also ==
- Cuba at the 2000 Summer Olympics
