= Alain Roca =

Cuban volleyball player

Alaín Roca
- Roca in 2011

Personal information
- Full name: Alaín Addys Roca Borrero
- Born: 7 September 1976 (age 50); Havana, Cuba
- Height: 1.98 m (6 ft 6 in)

Volleyball information
- Position: Setter
- Number: 13

National team
1995–2002	Cuba
Honours
Men's volleyball
Representing Cuba
World Championship
Bronze medal – third place	1998 Japan	Team
World League
Gold medal – first place	1998 Milan
Silver medal – second place	1997 Moscow
World Grand Champions Cup
Gold medal – first place	2001 Japan	Team
Bronze medal – third place	1997 Japan
Central American and Caribbean Games
Gold medal – first place	1998 Maracaibo	Team

Alaín Roca (born 7 September 1976) is a former volleyball player from Cuba. A two-time Olympian, he competed in the 1996 Summer Olympics in Atlanta and the 2000 Summer Olympics in Sydney with the Cuban men's national volleyball team.

Roca was honoured as "best setter" at the 2001 FIVB Grand Champions Cup in Japan, where he won a gold medal, and at the 2001 America's Cup in Buenos Aires, where he won a silver medal.

== Honours ==
- 1995: Start in the National Team of Cuba
  - Preolympic Games – Calgary, Canada (gold medal)
- 1996: World League – Rotterdam, Holland (4th place) and "Best Service"
  - Olympic Games – Atlanta, USA (6th place)
- 1997: World League – Moscow, Russia (silver medal)
  - World Grand Champions Cup – Japan (bronze medal)
  - Norceca Championship – Puerto Rico (gold medal)
- 1998: World League – Milan, Italy (gold medal)
  - World Champion – Japan (bronze medal) and "2nd Best Receiver"
  - Season 98–99 Cuneo, Italy (4th place)
  - Italy Cup – (gold medal) and "Record Speed Service"
  - Cope delle Coppe Europe – (silver medal)
  - Central American Games – Maracaibo, Venezuela (gold medal)
  - America Cup – Argentina (bronze medal)
  - Norceca Championship – Monterrey, Mexico (silver medal)
- 1999: World League – Argentina (silver medal)
  - World Cup – Japan (silver medal)
  - Season 99–00 Montichiari, Italy
  - Italy Cup – (silver medal)
  - America Cup – Tampa; Orlando, USA (bronze medal)
- 2000: America Cup – São Paulo, Brazil (gold medal)
  - Olympic Games – Sydney, Australia (7th place)
- 2001: Norceca Championship – Barbados (gold medal) "Best Setter" and "Best Service"
  - America Cup – Argentina (silver medal) and "Best Setter"
  - World Grand Champions Cup – Japan (gold medal) and "Best Setter"
- 2002: World League Participation – National Team of Cuba
- 2007-2008: Tigre Unisul, Brazil
  - Minero Championship (silver medal)
  - Santa Catarina State Championship (gold medal)
  - Super League (4th place)
- 2008-2009: Tigre Unisul, Brazil
  - Santa Catarina State Championship (silver medal)
  - Super League (4th place)
- 2009-2010: Pinheiros-SKY, Brazil
  - Super League (bronze medal)
- 2010-2011: Halkbank Sport Club, Ankara-Turkey
  - Turkey Championship (third place)
- 2011: August to 30 December: Top Volley Andreoli Latina, Italy
  - "All Star Volley" Marcelo Gabana in Memorial
- 2012: 31 December to 30 April: Ural-Ufa Volley, Russia
  - Russia Championship (5th place)
- 2012-2013: Club Fakel Novy Urengoy- Russia
  - Siberian Cup (bronze medal)
  - Russia Championship (5th place)
- Individual Titles: Best Service- World League 1996 (Rotterdam, Holland)
  - 2nd Best Reception – World Cup 1998 (Japan)
  - Record Speed Service (117 km/h) – Italy Cup 1999 (Rome, Italy)
  - Best Setter – Championship Norceca 2001 (Barbados)
  - Best Service – Championship Norceca 2001 (Barbados)
  - Best Setter – America Cup 2001 (Argentina)
  - Best setter – World Grand Championship Cup 2001 (Japan)
  - "All Star Volley" Marcelo Gabana in Memorial 2011 (Monza, Italy)
