= 2001 FIVB Volleyball Men's World Grand Champions Cup squads =

This article shows all participating teams in the 2001 FIVB Volleyball Men's World Grand Champions Cup.

== Argentina ==
#	Name	Date of birth	Height	Weight	Spike	Block	Club
2	Sebastián Creus	21 November 1981	198 cm (6 ft 6 in)		350 cm (11 ft 6 in)	320 cm (10 ft 6 in)
7	Hugo Conte	14 April 1963	197 cm (6 ft 6 in)		348 cm (11 ft 5 in)	328 cm (10 ft 9 in)
8	Lucas Chavez	3 April 1982	196 cm (6 ft 5 in)		348 cm (11 ft 5 in)	318 cm (10 ft 5 in)
9	Nicolas Efron	10 March 1979	196 cm (6 ft 5 in)		349 cm (11 ft 5 in)	320 cm (10 ft 6 in)
10	Alejandro Spajic	7 May 1976	204 cm (6 ft 8 in)		360 cm (11 ft 10 in)	340 cm (11 ft 2 in)
11	Jeronimo Bidegain	16 January 1977	200 cm (6 ft 7 in)		352 cm (11 ft 7 in)	335 cm (11 ft 0 in)
12	Javier Soldi	25 January 1977	204 cm (6 ft 8 in)		350 cm (11 ft 6 in)	330 cm (10 ft 10 in)
13	Gustavo Scholtis	16 December 1982	203 cm (6 ft 8 in)		341 cm (11 ft 2 in)	320 cm (10 ft 6 in)
14	Mauro Andreu	29 May 1981	193 cm (6 ft 4 in)		321 cm (10 ft 6 in)	303 cm (9 ft 11 in)
15	Maximo Torcello	31 March 1981	198 cm (6 ft 6 in)		345 cm (11 ft 4 in)	315 cm (10 ft 4 in)
17	Pablo Meana	10 June 1975	190 cm (6 ft 3 in)		325 cm (10 ft 8 in)	315 cm (10 ft 4 in)
18	Marco Dominguez	24 August 1982	195 cm (6 ft 5 in)		351 cm (11 ft 6 in)	317 cm (10 ft 5 in)

== Brazil ==
#	Name	Date of birth	Height	Weight	Spike	Block	Club
1	Sergio Nogueira	25 August 1978	183 cm (6 ft 0 in)		322 cm (10 ft 7 in)	310 cm (10 ft 2 in)
3	Giovane Gavio	7 September 1970	196 cm (6 ft 5 in)		340 cm (11 ft 2 in)	322 cm (10 ft 7 in)
4	Andre Heller	17 December 1975	199 cm (6 ft 6 in)		339 cm (11 ft 1 in)	321 cm (10 ft 6 in)
5	Henrique Randow	5 April 1978	201 cm (6 ft 7 in)		346 cm (11 ft 4 in)	320 cm (10 ft 6 in)
6	Mauricio Lima	27 January 1968	184 cm (6 ft 0 in)		321 cm (10 ft 6 in)	304 cm (10 ft 0 in)
9	André Nascimento	4 March 1979	195 cm (6 ft 5 in)		340 cm (11 ft 2 in)	320 cm (10 ft 6 in)
11	Anderson Rodrigues	21 May 1974	190 cm (6 ft 3 in)		330 cm (10 ft 10 in)	321 cm (10 ft 6 in)
12	Nalbert Bitencourt	9 March 1974	195 cm (6 ft 5 in)		329 cm (10 ft 10 in)	309 cm (10 ft 2 in)
14	Rodrigo Santana	17 April 1979	205 cm (6 ft 9 in)		350 cm (11 ft 6 in)	328 cm (10 ft 9 in)
15	Anderson Menezes	4 June 1978	193 cm (6 ft 4 in)		340 cm (11 ft 2 in)	315 cm (10 ft 4 in)
17	Ricardo Garcia	19 November 1975	191 cm (6 ft 3 in)		337 cm (11 ft 1 in)	320 cm (10 ft 6 in)
18	Dante Amaral	30 September 1980	201 cm (6 ft 7 in)		345 cm (11 ft 4 in)	327 cm (10 ft 9 in)

== Cuba ==
#	Name	Date of birth	Height	Weight	Spike	Block	Club
1	Leonel Marshall	25 September 1979	198 cm (6 ft 6 in)		365 cm (12 ft 0 in)	350 cm (11 ft 6 in)
5	Jorge Luis Hernández	20 August 1978	199 cm (6 ft 6 in)		359 cm (11 ft 9 in)	347 cm (11 ft 5 in)
6	Ivan Benito Ruiz	26 March 1977	195 cm (6 ft 5 in)		353 cm (11 ft 7 in)	340 cm (11 ft 2 in)
7	Angel Dennis	13 June 1977	193 cm (6 ft 4 in)		358 cm (11 ft 9 in)	335 cm (11 ft 0 in)
8	Pavel Pimienta	2 August 1976	204 cm (6 ft 8 in)		365 cm (12 ft 0 in)	340 cm (11 ft 2 in)
9	Maikel Salas	22 April 1981	192 cm (6 ft 4 in)		351 cm (11 ft 6 in)	345 cm (11 ft 4 in)
11	Raydel Poey	20 February 1982	198 cm (6 ft 6 in)		360 cm (11 ft 10 in)	340 cm (11 ft 2 in)
12	Ramon Gato	16 November 1973	193 cm (6 ft 4 in)		355 cm (11 ft 8 in)	325 cm (10 ft 8 in)
13	Alain Roca	7 September 1976	198 cm (6 ft 6 in)		350 cm (11 ft 6 in)	340 cm (11 ft 2 in)
14	Ihosvany Hernández	6 August 1972	206 cm (6 ft 9 in)		368 cm (12 ft 1 in)	350 cm (11 ft 6 in)
16	Yosenki Garcia	7 January 1977	200 cm (6 ft 7 in)		350 cm (11 ft 6 in)	340 cm (11 ft 2 in)
18	Yasser Romero	5 August 1979	190 cm (6 ft 3 in)		340 cm (11 ft 2 in)	330 cm (10 ft 10 in)

== Japan ==
#	Name	Date of birth	Height	Weight	Spike	Block	Club
1	Nobuyoshi Hosokawa	17 May 1973	191 cm (6 ft 3 in)		341 cm (11 ft 2 in)	333 cm (10 ft 11 in)
2	Tomonori Takahashi	12 July 1973	195 cm (6 ft 5 in)		340 cm (11 ft 2 in)	335 cm (11 ft 0 in)
4	Masayuki Izumikawa	22 January 1971	196 cm (6 ft 5 in)		352 cm (11 ft 7 in)	339 cm (11 ft 1 in)
5	Hiroyuki Kai	17 July 1978	193 cm (6 ft 4 in)		345 cm (11 ft 4 in)	325 cm (10 ft 8 in)
6	Kentaro Asahi	19 September 1975	197 cm (6 ft 6 in)		340 cm (11 ft 2 in)	333 cm (10 ft 11 in)
7	Masayoshi Manabe	21 August 1963	190 cm (6 ft 3 in)		326 cm (10 ft 8 in)	316 cm (10 ft 4 in)
8	Katsutoshi Tsumagari	2 November 1975	183 cm (6 ft 0 in)		317 cm (10 ft 5 in)	307 cm (10 ft 1 in)
9	Hiroaki Kawaura	13 November 1975	200 cm (6 ft 7 in)		345 cm (11 ft 4 in)	330 cm (10 ft 10 in)
11	Yoichi Kato	12 August 1976	190 cm (6 ft 3 in)		345 cm (11 ft 4 in)	325 cm (10 ft 8 in)
14	Takahiro Yamamoto	12 July 1978	202 cm (6 ft 8 in)		340 cm (11 ft 2 in)	322 cm (10 ft 7 in)
17	Yuta Abe	8 August 1981	190 cm (6 ft 3 in)		325 cm (10 ft 8 in)	316 cm (10 ft 4 in)
18	Yusuke Matsuta	31 October 1982	201 cm (6 ft 7 in)		342 cm (11 ft 3 in)	330 cm (10 ft 10 in)

== South Korea ==
#	Name	Date of birth	Height	Weight	Spike	Block	Club
3	Kim Se-jin	30 January 1974	200 cm (6 ft 7 in)		339 cm (11 ft 1 in)	337 cm (11 ft 1 in)
4	Bang Sin-bong	6 February 1975	200 cm (6 ft 7 in)		337 cm (11 ft 1 in)	335 cm (11 ft 0 in)
6	Tae-Woong Choi	9 April 1976	185 cm (6 ft 1 in)		330 cm (10 ft 10 in)	317 cm (10 ft 5 in)
7	Sang-Woo Kim	31 July 1973	195 cm (6 ft 5 in)		336 cm (11 ft 0 in)	330 cm (10 ft 10 in)
8	Kwan-Yeol Yoon	10 January 1978	198 cm (6 ft 6 in)		337 cm (11 ft 1 in)	334 cm (10 ft 11 in)
10	Sun-Ho Shin	28 May 1978	196 cm (6 ft 5 in)		339 cm (11 ft 1 in)	337 cm (11 ft 1 in)
11	Kyung-Soo Lee	27 April 1979	200 cm (6 ft 7 in)		337 cm (11 ft 1 in)	330 cm (10 ft 10 in)
12	Jin-Wook Suk	5 December 1976	186 cm (6 ft 1 in)		332 cm (10 ft 11 in)	318 cm (10 ft 5 in)
13	Oh-Hyun Yeo	2 September 1978	177 cm (5 ft 10 in)		317 cm (10 ft 5 in)	315 cm (10 ft 4 in)
16	Kyoung-Hoon Kim	16 April 1973	186 cm (6 ft 1 in)		331 cm (10 ft 10 in)	318 cm (10 ft 5 in)
17	Byung-Chul Chang	15 August 1976	195 cm (6 ft 5 in)		335 cm (11 ft 0 in)	332 cm (10 ft 11 in)

== Yugoslavia ==
#	Name	Date of birth	Height	Weight	Spike	Block	Club
1	Rajko Jokanovic	27 November 1971	190 cm (6 ft 3 in)		335 cm (11 ft 0 in)	315 cm (10 ft 4 in)
3	Mladen Majdak	4 July 1981	202 cm (6 ft 8 in)		343 cm (11 ft 3 in)	321 cm (10 ft 6 in)
5	Edin Skoric	1 December 1975	195 cm (6 ft 5 in)		338 cm (11 ft 1 in)	325 cm (10 ft 8 in)
6	Slobodan Boskan	18 August 1975	197 cm (6 ft 6 in)		343 cm (11 ft 3 in)	320 cm (10 ft 6 in)
7	Dula Mester	3 April 1972	203 cm (6 ft 8 in)		346 cm (11 ft 4 in)	325 cm (10 ft 8 in)
8	Vasa Mijic	11 April 1973	186 cm (6 ft 1 in)		332 cm (10 ft 11 in)	307 cm (10 ft 1 in)
9	Nikola Grbic	6 September 1973	194 cm (6 ft 4 in)		346 cm (11 ft 4 in)	320 cm (10 ft 6 in)
10	Vladimir Grbic	14 December 1970	193 cm (6 ft 4 in)		360 cm (11 ft 10 in)	350 cm (11 ft 6 in)
12	Andrija Geric	24 January 1977	203 cm (6 ft 8 in)		350 cm (11 ft 6 in)	323 cm (10 ft 7 in)
13	Goran Vujevic	27 February 1973	192 cm (6 ft 4 in)		339 cm (11 ft 1 in)	315 cm (10 ft 4 in)
14	Ivan Miljkovic	13 September 1979	206 cm (6 ft 9 in)		354 cm (11 ft 7 in)	333 cm (10 ft 11 in)
18	Igor Vusurovic	24 September 1974	200 cm (6 ft 7 in)		342 cm (11 ft 3 in)	323 cm (10 ft 7 in)
