= Anderson Rodrigues =

Anderson Rodrigues may refer to:

- Anderson Rodrigues (footballer) (born 1982), Brazilian footballer
- Anderson Rodrigues (volleyball) (born 1974), Brazilian volleyball player
