= Flor Colón =

Dominican Republic volleyball player (born 1969)

Personal information
- Full name: Flor Ángel Colón
- Nationality: Dominican
- Born: 26 September 1969 (age 57)
- Height: 188 cm (6 ft 2 in)
- Spike: 306 cm (120 in)
- Block: 300 cm (118 in)

Volleyball information
- Number: 4 (national team)

National team
- Years: Team
- 1998: Dominican Republic
Honours
Women's volleyball
Representing the Dominican Republic
Central American and Caribbean Games
Silver medal – second place	1998 Maracaibo	Team

Flor Ángel Colón (born 26 September 1969) is a retired Dominican Republic female volleyball player who won the silver medal with her national indoor team at the 1998 Central American and Caribbean Games.

She was part of the Dominican Republic women's national volleyball team at the 1998 FIVB Volleyball Women's World Championship in Japan.

== Career ==
Colón played the 1998–99 season of the Spanish top professional league, the Superliga Femenina de Voleibol with the club Caja Cantabria. She also played in Puerto Rico and the Dominican Republic with Naco, Simon Bolivar, Mirador and San Lazaro.

== Clubs ==
- (Spain) Caja Cantabria (1998–1999)
