= Cuban people in Italy =

Total population
- 20,000 (ISTAT: 2014)

Regions with significant populations
- Lombardy; Lazio; Piedmont

Languages
- Italian; Spanish

Religion
- Catholic Church

The presence of Cubans in Italy dates back after 1990s and most of them were married to Italian citizens.

== Numbers ==
In 2014, there were 20,000 regular immigrants from Cuba in Italy. In 2006, there were 14,000. The three cities with most number of Cubans are Rome, Milan and Turin.

== Notable Cubans in Italy ==
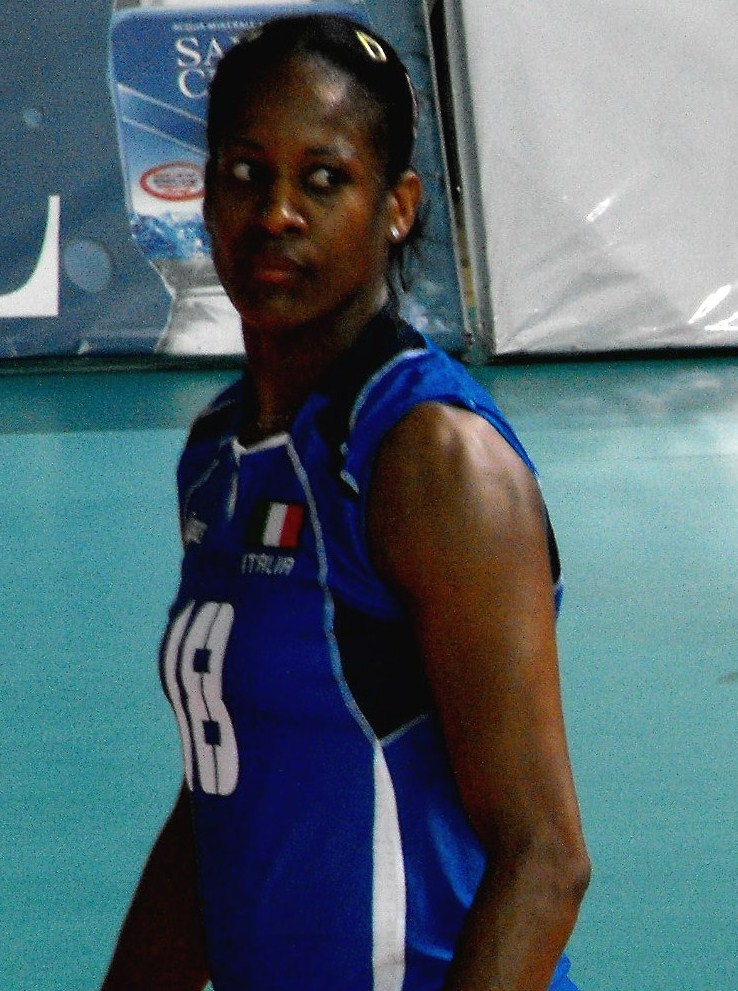
Taismary Agüero

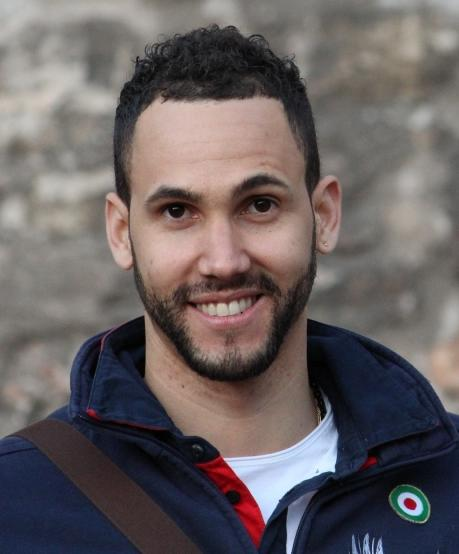
Osmany Juantorena

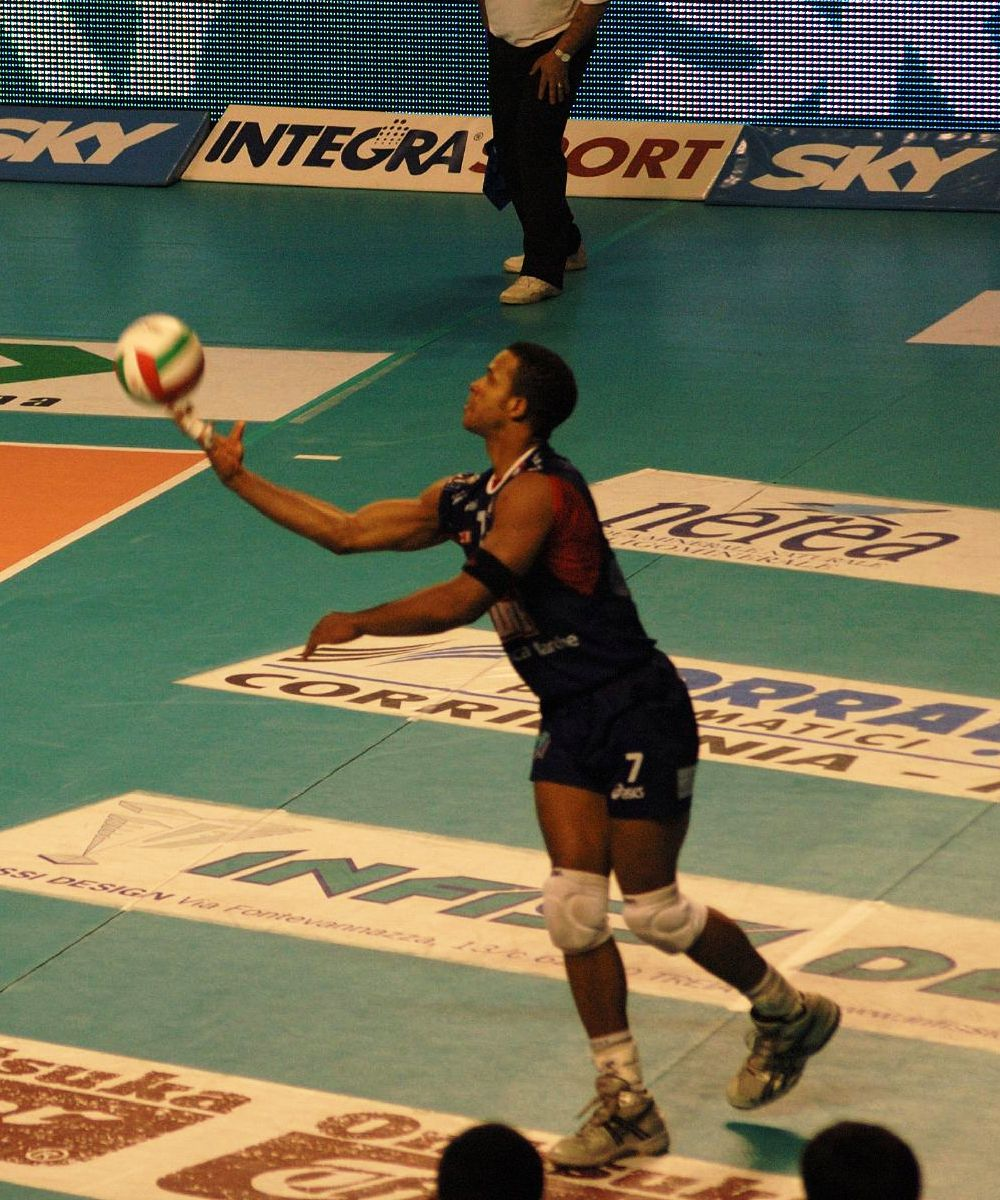
Ángel Dennis

- Mirka Francia (1975), volleyball player
- Magdelín Martínez (1976), triple jumper
- Ángel Dennis (1977), volleyball player
- Taismary Agüero (1977), volleyball player
- Osmany Juantorena (1985), volleyball player
- Frank Chamizo (1992), Wrestling player
- Libania Grenot (1983), athlete player
- Amaurys Pérez (1976), water polo player

== See also ==
- Italians in Cuba
