= Argilagos =

Argilagos is a surname. Notable people with the surname include:

- Alexeis Argilagos (1975–2026), Cuban volleyball player
- Joahnys Argilagos (born 1997), Cuban boxer
