= Enia Martínez =

Cuban volleyball player (born 1971)

Personal information
- Full name: Enia Martínez Méndez
- Born: 18 December 1971 (age 54); Pinar del Río, Cuba
- Height: 1.85 m (6 ft 1 in)

Volleyball information
- Position: Opposite
- Number: 7

Career
Years	Teams
1994	Pinar Del Rio

National team
1993–1999	Cuba
Honours
Women's volleyball
Representing Cuba
World Championship
Gold medal – first place	1994 Brazil	Team
FIVB World Cup
Gold medal – first place	1999 Japan	Team
Central American and Caribbean Games
Gold medal – first place	1993 Ponce	Team
Gold medal – first place	1998 Maracaibo	Team

Enia Martínez (born 18 December 1971) is a Cuban former volleyball player who was part of the Cuban women's national volleyball team. Martinez won gold medals with the Cuban team at the 1994 FIVB World Championship in Brazil and 1999 FIVB World Cup in Japan. On club level, she played with Pinar Del Rio.

== Clubs ==
- Pinar Del Rio (1994)
