= 2001 Men's NORCECA Volleyball Championship =

The 2001 Men's NORCECA Volleyball Championship was the 17th edition of the Men's Continental Volleyball Tournament, played by seven countries from September 21 to September 29, 2001, in Bridgetown, Barbados.

== Competing nations ==
Group A	Group B
Barbados; Canada; Cuba; Dominican Republic	Mexico; Puerto Rico; United States

== Preliminary round ==
=== Group A ===
	Team	Points	G	W	L	PW	PL	Ratio	SW	SL	Ratio
1.	Cuba	6	3	3	0	254	195	1.302	9	1	9.000
2.	Dominican R.	5	3	2	1	235	223	1.053	6	5	1.200
3.	Canada	4	3	1	2	268	267	1.003	6	6	1.000
4.	Barbados	3	3	0	3	155	227	0.682	0	9	0.000

- Friday 2001-09-21

Dominican Republic	3 – 2	Canada	25-16 17-25 24-26 25-18 15-11
Cuba	3 – 0	Barbados	25-16 25-11 25-19

- Saturday 2001-09-22

Cuba	3 – 0	Dominican Republic	25-19 25-18 25-17
Canada	3 – 0	Barbados	25-19 25-13 27-25

- Sunday 2001-09-23

Cuba	3 – 1	Canada	25-20 27-29 27-25 25-21
Dominican Republic	3 – 0	Barbados	25-19 25-17 25-16

=== Group B ===
	Team	Points	G	W	L	PW	PL	Ratio	SW	SL	Ratio
1.	United States	4	2	2	0	172	131	1.312	6	1	6.000
2.	Puerto Rico	3	2	1	1	193	186	1.037	4	4	1.000
3.	Mexico	2	2	0	2	135	183	0.737	1	6	0.166

- Friday 2001-09-21

Puerto Rico	3 – 1	Mexico	33-35 25-16 25-15 25-23

- Saturday 2001-09-22

United States	3 – 1	Puerto Rico	22-25 25-19 25-18 25-23

- Sunday 2001-09-23

United States	3 – 0	Mexico	25-16 25-16 25-14

== Second round ==
- Monday 2001-09-24
  - Quarterfinals

Canada	3 – 1	Puerto Rico	22-25 25-14 26-24 25-20
Dominican Republic	3 – 2	Mexico	26-24 25-17 21-25 26-28 16-14

== Final round ==
Semi-finals
2001-09-25 – Bridgetown, Barbados
United States	3
Dominican Republic	0
2001-09-25 – Bridgetown, Barbados
Cuba	3
Canada	1

Final
2001-09-26 – Bridgetown, Barbados
United States	0
Cuba	3
3rd place
2001-09-26 – Bridgetown, Barbados
Dominican Republic	0
Canada	3

- Tuesday 2001-09-25
  - Fifth-place match

Puerto Rico	3 – 0	Mexico	25-20 25-21 25-23

  - Semi-finals

United States	3 – 0	Dominican Republic	25-16 25-17 26-24
Cuba	3 – 1	Canada	25-22 25-15 19-25 25-18

- Wednesday 2001-09-26
  - Bronze-medal match

Dominican Republic	0 – 3	Canada	20-25 18-25 22-25

  - Gold-medal match

United States	0 – 3	Cuba	18-25 22-25 13-25

== Final ranking ==
Place	Team
1.	Cuba
2.	United States
3.	Canada
4.	Dominican Republic
5.	Puerto Rico
6.	Mexico
7.	Barbados

2001 Men's NORCECA winners

Cuba
13th title

  - Cuba, United States and Canada qualified for the 2002 FIVB Men's World Championship in Argentina

== Individual awards ==
- Most valuable player
  - (Cuba) Ángel Dennis
- Best scorer
  - (Canada) Sebastien Ruette
- Best spiker
  - (Dominican Republic) Elvis Contreras
- Best blocker
  - (Canada) Steve Brinkman
- Best server
  - (Cuba) Ángel Dennis
- Best digger
  - (Cuba) Ihosvany Chambers
- Best setter
  - (Cuba) Alain Roca
- Best receiver
  - (United States) Richard Lambourne
