= Water polo at the 1998 Central American and Caribbean Games =

Medalists
gold medal	Cuba
silver medal	Puerto Rico
bronze medal	Mexico

Water polo was contested for men only at the 1998 Central American and Caribbean Games in Maracaibo, Venezuela.

Event	Gold	Silver	Bronze
Men's water polo	Cuba (CUB)	Puerto Rico (PUR)	Mexico (MEX)
