= Anderson Rodrigues (volleyball) =

Brazilian volleyball player and coach

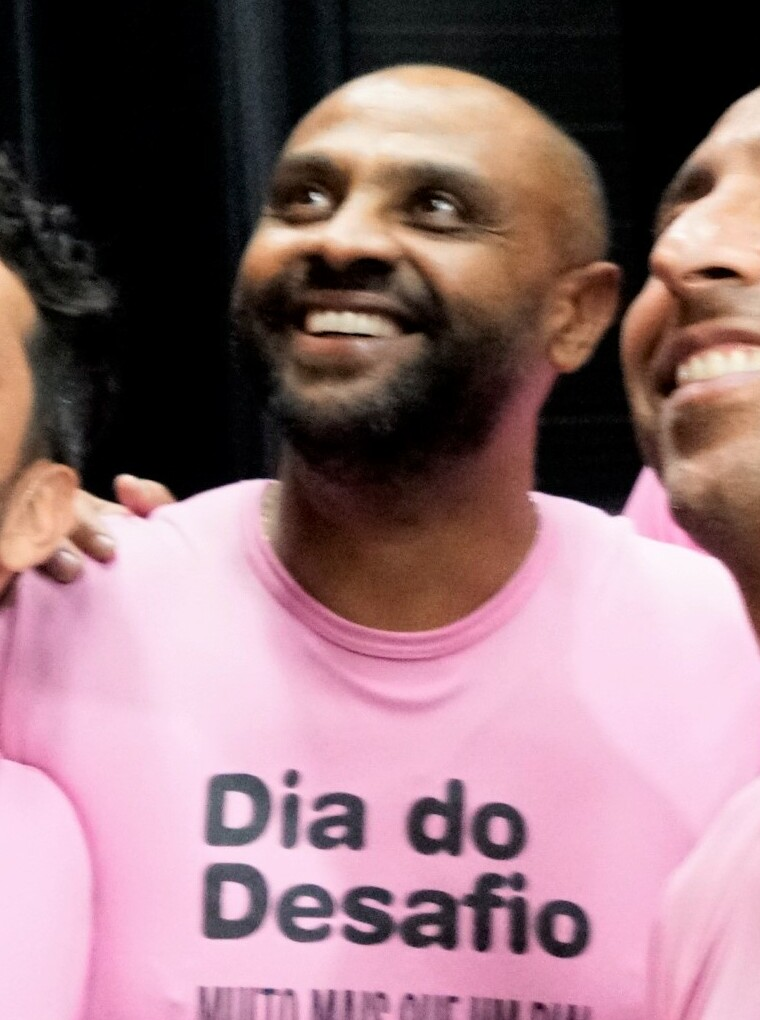

Personal information
- Full name: Anderson de Oliveira Rodrigues
- Born: 21 May 1974 (age 52); Belo Horizonte, Brazil
- Height: 1.90 m (6 ft 3 in)
- Weight: 95 kg (209 lb)
- Spike: 330 cm (130 in)
- Block: 321 cm (126 in)

Volleyball information
- Position: Opposite spiker

National team
2001–2008	Brazil
Honours
Men's volleyball
Representing Brazil
Event	1st	2nd	3rd
Olympic Games	1	1	0
World Championship	2	0	0
World Cup	2	0	0
World Grand Champions Cup	1	1	0
World League	6	1	0
Pan American Games	1	0	1
Total	13	3	1
Olympic Games
Gold medal – first place	2004 Athens	Team
Silver medal – second place	2008 Beijing	Team
World Championship
Gold medal – first place	2002 Argentina	Team
Gold medal – first place	2006 Japan	Team
World Cup
Gold medal – first place	2003 Japan	Team
Gold medal – first place	2007 Japan	Team
World Grand Champions Cup
Gold medal – first place	2005 Japan	Team
Silver medal – second place	2001 Japan	Team
World League
Gold medal – first place	2001 Katowice	Team
Gold medal – first place	2003 Madrid	Team
Gold medal – first place	2004 Rome	Team
Gold medal – first place	2005 Belgrade	Team
Gold medal – first place	2006 Moscow	Team
Gold medal – first place	2007 Katowice	Team
Silver medal – second place	2002 Belo Horizonte	Team
Pan American Games
Gold medal – first place	2007 Rio de Janeiro	Team
Bronze medal – third place	2003 Santo Domingo	Team

Anderson de Oliveira Rodrigues (born 21 May 1974) is a Brazilian volleyball coach and former player who won a gold medal at the 2004 Summer Olympics and a silver medal at the 2008 Summer Olympics. Anderson in 2007 Serie A1 League won Most Valuable Player.

He was born in Belo Horizonte.
