= Volleyball at the 1998 Central American and Caribbean Games =

Volleyball events were contested at the 1998 Central American and Caribbean Games in Maracaibo, Venezuela.

== Medal summary ==
Event	Gold	Silver	Bronze
Men's tournament	Cuba; Yosenki García; Alain Roca; Ángel Dennis; Ihosvany Hernández; Raúl Diago; Nicolás Vives; Alexeis Argilagos; Iván Ruiz; Osvaldo Hernández; Pavel Pimienta; Ramón Gato; Rodolfo Sánchez	Mexico; Gerardo Contreras; Luis Contreras; Carlos Coronato; Juan García; Alejandro Gutiérrez; José Martell; Gerardo Martínez; Víctor Purata; Ignacio Ramírez; Jesús Rangel; Juan Salazar; Eduardo Topete	Venezuela; José Alvarado; Manuel Blanco; Héctor Guzmán; Andrés Manzanillo; José Martínez; Winder Montaño; Luis Palacios; Juan Pérez; Heriberto Quero; Magdiel Robles; Andy Rojas; Gustavo Valderrama
Women's tournament	Cuba; Mireya Luis; Marlenis Costa; Lilia Izquierdo; Imara Esteves; Idalmis Gato; Ion Canet; Enia Martínez; Maybelis Martínez; Julia Luna; Regla Torres; Mirka Francia; Azurrima Álvarez	Dominican Republic; Nuris Arias; Yudelkys Bautista; Milagros Cabral; Evelyn Carrera; Flor Colón; Francisca Duarte; Juana González; Francia Jackson; Sofía Mercedes; Yndys Novas; Cosiri Rodríguez; Annerys Vargas	Venezuela; Yaseidy Castañeda; Sugglys Chinchilla; Milagros Cova; Alejandra Croquer; Oneida González; Lennys Hernández; Graciela Márquez; Yoraxi Melean; Carolyn Orozco; Daniela Patiño; Frankelina Rodríguez; Tibisay Rodríguez
