= Sébastien Ruette =

Canadian volleyball player (born 1977)

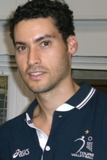
- Sébastien Ruette

Personal information
- Nationality: Canadian
- Born: 22 June 1977 (age 49)
- Height: 201 cm (6 ft 7 in)
- Weight: 95 kg (209 lb)
- Spike: 362 cm (143 in)
- Block: 328 cm (129 in)
- Education: Sherbooke

Volleyball information
- Number: 2

Career
Years	Teams
2002	Paris Volley, France

National team
2002	Canada

Sébastien Ruette (born 22 June 1977) is a retired Canadian male volleyball player. He was part of the Canada men's national volleyball team at the 2002 FIVB Volleyball Men's World Championship in Japan. He played for Paris Volley, France.

== Clubs ==
- Paris Volley, France (2002)
