= Anderson Rodrigues (footballer) =

Brazilian footballer (born 1982)

Personal information
- Full name: Anderson Paim Rodrigues
- Date of birth: November 7, 1982 (age 43)
- Place of birth: Bagé, Brazil
- Height: 1.68 m (5 ft 6 in)
- Position: Left back

Team information
- Current team: Guarany

Senior career*
Years	Team	Apps	(Gls)
2004	Veranópolis		
2005	Guarany		
2005	Caxias		
2005–2006	Ipatinga (Loan)		
2006	Cruzeiro		
2007	Vitória (Loan)		
2007	Villa Nova-MG (Loan)		
2008	Guarany (Loan)		
- * Club domestic league appearances and goals

Anderson Paim Rodrigues (born November 7, 1982) is a Brazilian left back. He currently plays for Guarany on loan from Cruzeiro.

== Contract ==
- Guarany (Loan) 9 January 2008 to 5 May 2008
- Cruzeiro 1 December 2005 to 30 November 2008
