= 2005 FIVB Volleyball World League =

International sport competition

2005 World League
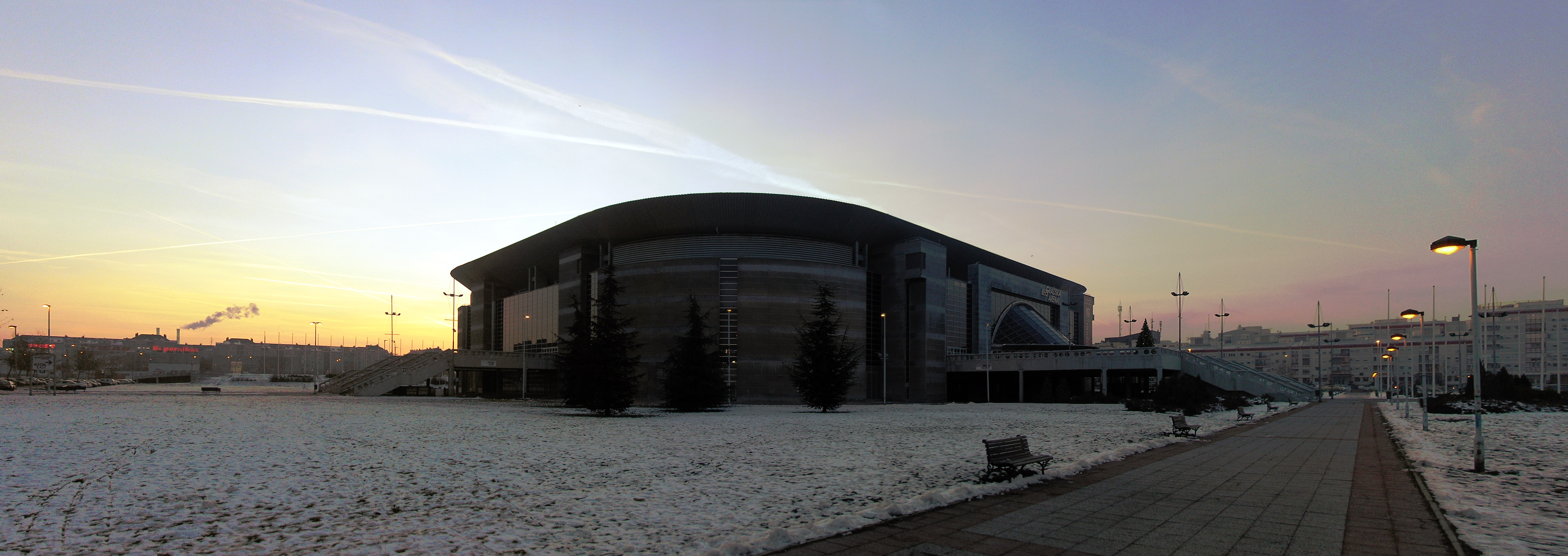
- The Belgrade Arena hosted the final round

Tournament details
- Host country: Serbia and Montenegro (Final)
- Dates: 27 May – 10 July
- Teams: 12

Final positions
- Champions: Brazil (5th title)

Tournament awards
- MVP: (Serbia and Montenegro) Ivan Miljković

The 2005 FIVB Volleyball World League was the 16th edition of the annual men's international volleyball tournament, played by 12 countries from 27 May to 10 July 2005. The Final Round was held in Belgrade, Serbia and Montenegro.

== Pools composition ==
Pool A	Pool B	Pool C
Brazil; Venezuela; Japan; Portugal	Italy; Cuba; Bulgaria; France	Serbia and Montenegro; Greece; Argentina; Poland

== Intercontinental round ==
- The Final Round hosts Serbia and Montenegro, the winners of each pool and a wild card chosen by the FIVB will qualify for the Final Round. If Serbia and Montenegro are ranked first in Pool C, the team ranked second of Pool C will qualify for the Final Round.

=== Pool A ===
Pos	Team	Pld	W	L	Pts	SW	SL	SR	SPW	SPL	SPR	Qualification
1	Brazil	12	11	1	23	33	9	3.667	1031	892	1.156	Final round
2	Portugal	12	6	6	18	21	19	1.105	935	910	1.027	
3	Venezuela	12	5	7	17	19	22	0.864	935	966	0.968	
4	Japan	12	2	10	14	9	32	0.281	885	1018	0.869	

Date		Score		Set 1	Set 2	Set 3	Set 4	Set 5	Total	Report
28 May	Portugal	3–0	Japan	25–22	27–25	25–22			77–69	P2
28 May	Venezuela	1–3	Brazil	19–25	34–32	22–25	35–37		110–119	P2
29 May	Venezuela	2–3	Brazil	25–23	21–25	10–25	25–20	13–15	94–108	P2
29 May	Portugal	3–1	Japan	22–25	25–19	25–21	25–20		97–85	P2
4 Jun	Portugal	0–3	Brazil	16–25	22–25	23–25			61–75	P2
4 Jun	Venezuela	3–1	Japan	22–25	28–26	25–21	25–21		100–93	P2
5 Jun	Venezuela	3–0	Japan	31–29	25–22	25–21			81–72	P2
5 Jun	Portugal	3–0	Brazil	25–22	25–20	25–23			75–65	P2
11 Jun	Japan	0–3	Brazil	24–26	20–25	21–25			65–76	P2
11 Jun	Portugal	3–0	Venezuela	25–18	25–21	25–14			75–53	P2
12 Jun	Japan	1–3	Brazil	17–25	19–25	29–27	18–25		83–102	P2
12 Jun	Portugal	3–0	Venezuela	25–23	25–23	25–21			75–67	P2
18 Jun	Brazil	3–1	Portugal	26–24	25–23	20–25	25–18		96–90	P2
18 Jun	Japan	0–3	Venezuela	22–25	18–25	20–25			60–75	P2
19 Jun	Brazil	3–0	Portugal	25–21	25–20	25–23			75–64	P2
19 Jun	Japan	0–3	Venezuela	21–25	21–25	21–25			63–75	P2
24 Jun	Venezuela	0–3	Portugal	20–25	20–25	22–25			62–75	P2
25 Jun	Brazil	3–0	Japan	25–16	25–14	25–18			75–48	P2
26 Jun	Brazil	3–0	Japan	25–20	25–16	25–23			75–59	P2
26 Jun	Venezuela	3–0	Portugal	25–20	25–22	25–19			75–61	P2
2 Jul	Brazil	3–0	Venezuela	25–16	25–20	25–21			75–57	P2
2 Jul	Japan	3–2	Portugal	18–25	20–25	27–25	26–24	16–14	107–113	P2
3 Jul	Brazil	3–1	Venezuela	25–22	15–25	25–22	25–17		90–86	P2
3 Jul	Japan	3–0	Portugal	25–21	25–22	31–29			81–72	P2

=== Pool B ===
Pos	Team	Pld	W	L	Pts	SW	SL	SR	SPW	SPL	SPR	Qualification
1	Cuba	12	8	4	20	29	17	1.706	1071	1028	1.042	Final round
2	Bulgaria	12	6	6	18	27	22	1.227	1112	1067	1.042	
3	Italy	12	6	6	18	22	26	0.846	1055	1073	0.983	
4	France	12	4	8	16	17	30	0.567	1005	1075	0.935	

Date		Score		Set 1	Set 2	Set 3	Set 4	Set 5	Total	Report
27 May	Bulgaria	1–3	Cuba	24–26	25–16	20–25	19–25		88–92	P2
27 May	Italy	0–3	France	24–26	17–25	22–25			63–76	P2
29 May	Italy	3–0	France	25–18	25–18	25–13			75–49	P2
29 May	Bulgaria	0–3	Cuba	20–25	24–26	23–25			67–76	P2
3 Jun	France	3–2	Bulgaria	25–20	18–25	25–21	21–25	15–13	104–104	P2
3 Jun	Italy	1–3	Cuba	26–24	18–25	20–25	22–25		86–99	P2
4 Jun	France	0–3	Bulgaria	24–26	19–25	15–25			58–76	P2
5 Jun	Italy	3–1	Cuba	25–18	25–20	19–25	25–16		94–79	P2
10 Jun	Italy	2–3	Bulgaria	25–18	29–31	10–25	25–20	13–15	102–109	P2
11 Jun	France	0–3	Cuba	24–26	23–25	20–25			67–76	P2
12 Jun	France	3–2	Cuba	25–19	18–25	20–25	25–21	15-7	103–97	P2
12 Jun	Italy	3–2	Bulgaria	25–19	24–26	15–25	25–19	17–15	106–104	P2
17 Jun	France	2–3	Italy	25–19	25–18	24–26	17–25	13–15	104–103	P2
17 Jun	Cuba	1–3	Bulgaria	22–25	25–19	20–25	22–25		89–94	P2
18 Jun	France	2–3	Italy	25–21	21–25	22–25	26–24	13–15	107–110	P2
18 Jun	Cuba	3–2	Bulgaria	27–25	21–25	23–25	25–21	15–9	111–105	P2
24 Jun	Bulgaria	3–0	France	25–19	25–21	29–27			79–67	P2
24 Jun	Cuba	3–0	Italy	25–21	25–19	25–21			75–61	P2
25 Jun	Cuba	1–3	Italy	20–25	25–23	27–29	19–25		91–102	P2
26 Jun	Bulgaria	2–3	France	25–21	22–25	25–23	23–25	11–15	106–109	P2
1 Jul	Bulgaria	3–1	Italy	30–32	25–17	25–23	25–21		105–93	P2
1 Jul	Cuba	3–0	France	33–31	33–31	25–12			91–74	P2
2 Jul	Cuba	3–1	France	20–25	25–22	25–19	25–21		95–87	P2
3 Jul	Bulgaria	3–0	Italy	25–21	25–20	25–19			75–60	P2

=== Pool C ===
Pos	Team	Pld	W	L	Pts	SW	SL	SR	SPW	SPL	SPR	Qualification
1	Poland	12	9	3	21	32	19	1.684	1151	1114	1.033	Final round
2	Serbia and Montenegro (Note: Qualified as hosts) (H)	12	7	5	19	26	23	1.130	1124	1126	0.998	Final round
3	Greece	12	5	7	17	22	24	0.917	1034	1004	1.030	
4	Argentina	12	3	9	15	18	32	0.563	1100	1165	0.944	

(H) Host
Notes:

Date		Score		Set 1	Set 2	Set 3	Set 4	Set 5	Total	Report
27 May	Poland	3–1	Argentina	25–20	23–25	25–23	25–23		98–91	P2
27 May	Greece	3–0	Serbia and Montenegro	26–24	25–18	25–21			76–63	P2
28 May	Poland	3–1	Argentina	19–25	25–22	25–21	25–22		94–90	P2
28 May	Greece	3–1	Serbia and Montenegro	23–25	25–22	25–16	25–19		98–82	P2
3 Jun	Poland	3–2	Greece	17–25	25–23	19–25	25–20	15–13	101–106	P2
3 Jun	Argentina	1–3	Serbia and Montenegro	23–25	20–25	25–19	24–26		92–95	P2
4 Jun	Poland	3–0	Greece	26–24	25–17	27–25			78–66	P2
5 Jun	Argentina	3–2	Serbia and Montenegro	20–25	25–23	17–25	25–14	15–11	102–98	P2
10 Jun	Argentina	1–3	Greece	21–25	19–25	25–19	14–25		79–94	P2
11 Jun	Serbia and Montenegro	3–2	Poland	30–28	16–25	25–23	22–25	21–19	114–120	P2
12 Jun	Argentina	3–2	Greece	17–25	23–25	25–23	30–28	15–13	110–114	P2
12 Jun	Serbia and Montenegro	1–3	Poland	19–25	22–25	25–22	24–26		90–98	P2
17 Jun	Greece	2–3	Poland	25–19	21–25	18–25	25–18	13–15	102–102	P2
18 Jun	Serbia and Montenegro	3–1	Argentina	22–25	25–18	25–17	25–21		97–81	P2
19 Jun	Serbia and Montenegro	3–2	Argentina	25–21	32–30	27–29	17–25	34–32	135–137	P2
19 Jun	Greece	3–1	Poland	25–18	17–25	26–24	25–16		93–83	P2
24 Jun	Poland	3–1	Serbia and Montenegro	20–25	25–17	25–23	25–20		95–85	P2
24 Jun	Greece	3–0	Argentina	25–20	25–20	25–22			75–62	P2
25 Jun	Poland	2–3	Serbia and Montenegro	25–23	25–23	20–25	21–25	10–15	101–111	P2
26 Jun	Greece	1–3	Argentina	25–15	22–25	17–25	20–25		84–90	P2
1 Jul	Serbia and Montenegro	3–0	Greece	27–25	25–22	25–17			77–64	P2
1 Jul	Argentina	0–3	Poland	21–25	19–25	20–25			60–75	P2
2 Jul	Serbia and Montenegro	3–0	Greece	25–15	25–22	27–25			77–62	P2
3 Jul	Argentina	2–3	Poland	23–25	23–25	25–21	25–20	10–15	106–106	P2

== Final round ==
- Venue: Belgrade Arena, Belgrade, Serbia and Montenegro
- All times are Central European Summer Time (UTC+02:00).

=== First final round ===
Date	Time		Score		Set 1	Set 2	Set 3	Set 4	Set 5	Total	Report
08 Jul	17:07	Cuba	2–3	Poland	25–23	24–26	16–25	25–22	13–15	103–111	P2
08 Jul	20:07	Serbia and Montenegro	1–3	Brazil	21–25	25–23	24–26	21–25		91–99	P2

=== Final four ===
Semifinals
9 July
Cuba	1
Brazil	3
9 July
Poland	2
Serbia and Montenegro	3

Final
10 July
Brazil	3
Serbia and Montenegro	1
3rd place match
10 July
Cuba	3
Poland	2

==== Semifinals ====
Date	Time		Score		Set 1	Set 2	Set 3	Set 4	Set 5	Total	Report
09 Jul	17:07	Cuba	1–3	Brazil	18–25	19–25	25–22	23–25		85–97	P2
09 Jul	20:07	Poland	2–3	Serbia and Montenegro	26–24	25–19	23–25	20–25	8–15	102–108	P2

==== 3rd place match ====
Date	Time		Score		Set 1	Set 2	Set 3	Set 4	Set 5	Total	Report
10 Jul	16:07	Cuba	3–2	Poland	25–23	22–25	24–26	25–18	15–13	111–105	P2

==== Final ====
Date	Time		Score		Set 1	Set 2	Set 3	Set 4	Set 5	Total	Report
10 Jul	19:07	Brazil	3–1	Serbia and Montenegro	14–25	25–14	25–19	25–16		89–74	P2

== Final standing ==
Rank	Team
1st place, gold medalist(s)	Brazil
2nd place, silver medalist(s)	Serbia and Montenegro
3rd place, bronze medalist(s)	Cuba
4	Poland
5	Bulgaria
5	Portugal
7	Greece
7	Italy
7	Venezuela
10	Argentina
10	France
10	Japan

2005 World League champions

Brazil
5th title

12-man Roster for Final Round
Marcelinho, André Heller, Giba, Murilo, André, Sérgio, Anderson, Samuel, Gustavo, Rodrigão, Ricardo, Dante
Head coach
Bernardinho

== Awards ==
- Most valuable player
  (Serbia and Montenegro) Ivan Miljkovic
- Best scorer
  (Serbia and Montenegro) Ivan Miljkovic
- Best spiker
  (Cuba) Henry Bell Cisnero
- Best blocker
  (Brazil) Dante Amaral
- Best server
  (Serbia and Montenegro) Ivan Miljkovic
- Best setter
  (Cuba) Yoandry Diaz
- Best libero
  (Serbia and Montenegro) Marko Samardzić
