= Kim Sang-woo (volleyball) =

South Korean volleyball player (born 1973)

Personal information
- Full name: Kim Sang-woo
- Nationality: South Korean
- Born: July 31, 1973 (age 53); Seoul, South Korea
- Height: 1.94 m (6 ft 4 in)
- Weight: 88 kg (194 lb)
- Education: Sungkyunkwan University

Coaching information
- Current team: (South Korea) Seoul Woori Card Wibee
Previous teams coached
Years	Teams
2010–11; 2012; 2013–15	Gumi LIG Insurance Greaters; South Korea national team (Jr.); Sungkyunkwan University

Volleyball information
- Position: Middle blocker

Career
Years	Teams
1995–2007	(South Korea) Samsung Bluefangs

National team
1994–2002	South Korea
Honours
Representing South Korea
Men's volleyball
Asian Games
Gold medal – first place	2002 Busan	Team
Silver medal – second place	1998 Bangkok	Team
Bronze medal – third place	1994 Hiroshima	Team
Asian Men's Volleyball Championship
Gold medal – first place	2001 Changwon	Team
Bronze medal – third place	1995 Seoul	Team
Asian Men's U20 Volleyball Championship
Gold medal – first place	1992 Tehran	Team
- Last updated: April 24, 2015

Kim Sang-woo (Korean: 김상우; born July 31, 1973) is a retired volleyball player from South Korea, who currently coaches Seoul Woori Card Wibee in the V-League. As a player Kim was a middle blocker and helped the Samsung Bluefangs win nine consecutive national championships in the amateur Super League (1997−2004) and pro V-League (2005).

Kim competed with the South Korean national team from 1994 to 2002 and took part in the 1996 Summer Olympics. He was also honored as best spiker at the 2001 FIVB World Grand Champions Cup in Japan.

== Individual awards ==
- 2001 FIVB World Grand Champions Cup "Best Spiker"
