= 2001 FIVB Volleyball Men's World Grand Champions Cup =

2001 Men's World Grand Champions Cup

Tournament details
- Host country: Japan
- Dates: 20–25 November
- Teams: 6
- Venues: 2 (in 2 host cities)

Final positions
- Champions: Cuba (1st title)

Tournament awards
- MVP: (Federal Republic of Yugoslavia) Ivan Miljković

The 2001 FIVB Volleyball Men's World Grand Champions Cup was held in Nagoya and Tokyo, Japan from 20 to 25 November 2001.

== Qualification ==
Team	Qualified as
Japan	Hosts
South Korea	2001 Asian Champions
Yugoslavia	2001 European Champions
Cuba	2001 NORCECA Champions
Brazil	2001 South American Champions
Argentina	Wild Card

== Competition formula ==
The competition formula of the 2001 Men's World Grand Champions Cup was the single Round-Robin system. Each team plays once against each of the 5 remaining teams. Points were accumulated during the whole tournament, and the final standing was determined by the total points gained.

== Venues ==
- Nagoya Rainbow Hall, Nagoya, Japan
- Tokyo Metropolitan Gymnasium, Tokyo, Japan

== Results ==
- All times are Japan Standard Time (UTC+09:00).

Pos	Team	Pld	W	L	Pts	SW	SL	SR	SPW	SPL	SPR
1	Cuba	5	5	0	10	15	3	5.000	430	356	1.208
2	Brazil	5	4	1	9	14	4	3.500	422	356	1.185
3	Yugoslavia	5	3	2	8	9	7	1.286	378	326	1.160
4	South Korea	5	2	3	7	7	10	0.700	369	394	0.937
5	Japan	5	1	4	6	4	14	0.286	361	426	0.847
6	Argentina	5	0	5	5	4	15	0.267	357	459	0.778

=== Nagoya round ===
Date	Time		Score		Set 1	Set 2	Set 3	Set 4	Set 5	Total	Report
20 Nov	14:00	South Korea	1–3	Brazil	21–25	21–25	25–19	19–25		86–94	P2
20 Nov	16:00	Cuba	3–0	Yugoslavia	25–20	25–22	25–23			75–65	P2
20 Nov	19:00	Japan	3–2	Argentina	24–26	25–21	22–25	25–17	15–13	111–102	P2
21 Nov	14:00	South Korea	0–3	Cuba	17–25	17–25	22–25			56–75	P2
21 Nov	16:00	Brazil	3–0	Argentina	25–16	25–15	25–7			75–38	P2
21 Nov	19:00	Yugoslavia	3–0	Japan	25–15	25–18	25–17			75–50	P2

=== Tokyo round ===
Date	Time		Score		Set 1	Set 2	Set 3	Set 4	Set 5	Total	Report
23 Nov	13:00	Cuba	3–2	Brazil	25–21	22–25	20–25	25–20	15–11	107–102	P2
23 Nov	15:00	Argentina	1–3	Yugoslavia	25–22	21–25	11–25	18–25		75–97	P2
23 Nov	18:00	Japan	0–3	South Korea	21–25	21–25	25–27			67–77	P2
24 Nov	13:00	Cuba	3–1	Japan	22–25	25–18	25–18	25–13		97–74	P2
24 Nov	15:00	South Korea	3–1	Argentina	23–25	27–25	25–21	25–12		100–83	P2
24 Nov	18:00	Brazil	3–0	Yugoslavia	26–24	25–20	25–22			76–66	P2
25 Nov	13:00	Argentina	0–3	Cuba	18–25	17–25	24–26			59–76	P2
25 Nov	15:00	Yugoslavia	3–0	South Korea	25–16	25–18	25–16			75–50	P2
25 Nov	18:00	Japan	0–3	Brazil	21–25	19–25	19–25			59–75	P2

== Final standing ==
Rank	Team
1st place, gold medalist(s)	Cuba
2nd place, silver medalist(s)	Brazil
3rd place, bronze medalist(s)	Yugoslavia
4	South Korea
5	Japan
6	Argentina

2001 Men's World Grand Champions Cup champions

Cuba
First title

Team Roster

Leonel Marshall, Jorge Luis Hernandez, Iván Ruíz, Ángel Dennis, Pavel Pimienta, Maikel Salas, Raidel Poey, Ramón Gato, Alain Roca, Ihosvany Hernández, Yosenki García, Yasser Romero

Head Coach: Gilberto Herrera

== Awards ==
- MVP: (Federal Republic of Yugoslavia) Ivan Miljković
- Best scorer: (Federal Republic of Yugoslavia) Ivan Miljković
- Best spiker: (South Korea) Kim Sang-woo
- Best blocker: (Federal Republic of Yugoslavia) Andrija Gerić
- Best server: (Cuba) Ángel Dennis
- Best digger: (Japan) Katsutoshi Tsumagari
- Best setter: (Cuba) Alain Roca
- Best receiver: (Federal Republic of Yugoslavia) Vasa Mijić
