= 1997 FIVB Volleyball World League =

International sport competition

1997 World League
Tournament details
- Host country: Russia (Final)
- Dates: 16 May – 5 July
- Teams: 12

Final positions
- Champions: Italy (6th title)

Tournament awards
- MVP: (Netherlands) Guido Görtzen

The 1997 FIVB Volleyball World League was the eighth edition of the annual men's international volleyball tournament, played by 12 countries from 16 May to 5 July 1997. The Final Round was held in Moscow, Russia.

== Pools composition ==
Pool A	Pool B	Pool C
Argentina; Brazil; Bulgaria; Japan	China; Italy; Spain; Yugoslavia	Cuba; Netherlands; Russia; South Korea

== Intercontinental round ==
- The top two teams in each pool will qualify for the Final Round. If the Final Round hosts Russia finish lower than second in Pool C, they will still qualify along with the best two second teams across all three pools.

=== Pool A ===
Pos	Team	Pld	W	L	Pts	SW	SL	SR	SPW	SPL	SPR	Qualification
1	Brazil	12	11	1	23	34	9	3.778	614	420	1.462	Final round
2	Bulgaria	12	9	3	21	29	16	1.813	596	498	1.197	Final round
3	Argentina	12	4	8	16	20	25	0.800	526	588	0.895	
4	Japan	12	0	12	12	3	36	0.083	339	569	0.596	

Date		Score		Set 1	Set 2	Set 3	Set 4	Set 5	Total
16 May	Bulgaria	2–3	Brazil	14–16	15–10	14–16	15–7	13–15	71–64
17 May	Bulgaria	0–3	Brazil	7–15	14–16	14–16			35–47
17 May	Argentina	3–0	Japan	15–3	15–7	15–8			45–18
18 May	Argentina	3–0	Japan	15–11	15–2	15–12			45–25
23 May	Bulgaria	3–0	Japan	15–6	15–5	15–8			45–19
24 May	Bulgaria	3–0	Japan	15–5	15–8	15–2			45–15
24 May	Argentina	1–3	Brazil	16–14	13–15	13–15	8–15		50–59
25 May	Argentina	0–3	Brazil	5–15	10–15	6–15			21–45
30 May	Bulgaria	3–1	Argentina	13–15	17–16	15–10	15–6		60–47
31 May	Japan	0–3	Brazil	9–15	8–15	5–15			20–45
31 May	Bulgaria	3–1	Argentina	15–11	2–15	15–9	15–10		47–45
1 Jun	Japan	0–3	Brazil	3–15	12–15	5–15			20–45
6 Jun	Brazil	3–1	Argentina	15–17	15–4	15–8	15–8		60–37
7 Jun	Japan	1–3	Bulgaria	15–8	6–15	12–15	12–15		45–53
8 Jun	Brazil	3–1	Argentina	16–17	15–4	15–3	15–9		61–33
8 Jun	Japan	0–3	Bulgaria	8–15	14–16	3–15			25–46
13 Jun	Brazil	1–3	Bulgaria	15–12	12–15	12–15	5–15		44–57
14 Jun	Japan	0–3	Argentina	12–15	10–15	16–17			38–47
15 Jun	Brazil	3–0	Bulgaria	15–4	15–3	15–7			45–14
15 Jun	Japan	1–3	Argentina	13–15	15–9	13–15	11–15		52–54
20 Jun	Brazil	3–0	Japan	15–2	15–6	15–12			45–20
21 Jun	Argentina	1–3	Bulgaria	12–15	15–12	7–15	5–15		39–57
21 Jun	Brazil	3–1	Japan	15–6	15–12	9–15	15–6		54–40
22 Jun	Argentina	2–3	Bulgaria	15–13	10–15	15–8	11–15	12–15	63–66

=== Pool B ===
Pos	Team	Pld	W	L	Pts	SW	SL	SR	SPW	SPL	SPR	Qualification
1	Italy	12	10	2	22	34	13	2.615	652	465	1.402	Final round
2	Yugoslavia	12	8	4	20	29	15	1.933	583	461	1.265	
3	Spain	12	4	8	16	18	30	0.600	544	622	0.875	
4	China	12	2	10	14	8	31	0.258	313	544	0.575	

Date		Score		Set 1	Set 2	Set 3	Set 4	Set 5	Total
16 May	Spain	3–2	China	15–2	10–15	13–15	15–5	15–8	68–45
17 May	Italy	3–1	Yugoslavia	13–15	15–8	16–14	15–6		59–43
18 May	Spain	3–0	China	15–5	15–8	15–10			45–23
18 May	Italy	3–0	Yugoslavia	15–7	15–6	15–8			45–21
23 May	Yugoslavia	3–0	China	15–8	15–8	15–6			45–22
24 May	Italy	3–0	Spain	14–16	15–8	15–6			59–40
24 May	Yugoslavia	3–0	China	15–5	15–3	15–3			45–11
25 May	Italy	3–1	Spain	15–4	15–10	10–15	15–2		55–31
30 May	Spain	1–3	Yugoslavia	12–15	15–9	7–15	11–15		45–54
31 May	China	0–3	Italy	6–15	6–15	6–15			18–45
1 Jun	Spain	3–2	Yugoslavia	15–13	6–15	13–15	15–13	15–10	64–66
1 Jun	China	0–3	Italy	11–15	15–17	6–15			32–47
6 Jun	Spain	2–3	Italy	12–15	15–8	17–15	11–15	12–15	67–68
7 Jun	China	0–3	Yugoslavia	5–15	7–15	10–15			22–45
8 Jun	Spain	3–2	Italy	15–13	15–8	1–15	8–15	15–11	54–62
8 Jun	China	0–3	Yugoslavia	2–15	2–15	6–15			10–45
13 Jun	Yugoslavia	3–0	Spain	15–13	15–7	15–5			45–25
14 Jun	Yugoslavia	3–0	Spain	15–13	15–13	15–10			45–36
14 Jun	Italy	3–0	China	15–8	15–7	15–3			45–18
15 Jun	Italy	3–0	China	15–6	15–3	15–3			45–12
20 Jun	Yugoslavia	2–3	Italy	15–10	15–2	12–15	13–15	10–15	65–57
21 Jun	China	3–1	Spain	15–5	15–11	10–15	15–9		55–40
21 Jun	Yugoslavia	3–2	Italy	15–13	15–10	9–15	10–15	15–12	64–65
22 Jun	China	3–0	Spain	15–11	15–12	15–6			45–29

=== Pool C ===
Pos	Team	Pld	W	L	Pts	SW	SL	SR	SPW	SPL	SPR	Qualification
1	Cuba	12	11	1	23	35	6	5.833	595	369	1.612	Final round
2	Netherlands	12	9	3	21	28	17	1.647	585	523	1.119	Final round
3	Russia (Note: Qualified as hosts) (H)	12	2	10	14	14	30	0.467	493	570	0.865	Final round
4	South Korea	12	2	10	14	8	32	0.250	351	562	0.625	

(H) Host
Notes:

Date		Score		Set 1	Set 2	Set 3	Set 4	Set 5	Total
16 May	Cuba	3–0	Russia	15–6	15–12	15–8			45–26
17 May	Netherlands	3–1	South Korea	13–15	15–7	15–13	15–7		58–42
17 May	Cuba	3–0	Russia	15–2	15–9	15–11			45–22
18 May	Netherlands	3–0	South Korea	15–4	15–10	15–10			45–24
23 May	Russia	1–3	Netherlands	5–15	15–17	15–4	8–15		61–64
24 May	South Korea	0–3	Cuba	14–16	6–15	8–15			28–46
24 May	Russia	2–3	Netherlands	15–10	13–15	15–9	6–15	12–15	43–51
25 May	South Korea	0–3	Cuba	12–15	7–15	6–15			25–45
31 May	Netherlands	0–3	Cuba	8–15	5–15	11–15			29–46
31 May	South Korea	3–1	Russia	15–12	6–15	15–9	15–5		51–41
1 Jun	Netherlands	0–3	Cuba	14–16	3–15	12–15			29–46
1 Jun	South Korea	3–1	Russia	15–7	10–15	16–14	15–12		56–48
6 Jun	Cuba	3–0	South Korea	15–8	15–1	15–5			45–14
7 Jun	Netherlands	3–0	Russia	15–13	15–10	15–7			45–30
7 Jun	Cuba	3–0	South Korea	15–3	15–2	15–1			45–6
8 Jun	Netherlands	3–1	Russia	15–10	12–15	15–13	15–12		57–50
13 Jun	Russia	1–3	Cuba	9–15	15–13	11–15	12–15		47–58
14 Jun	South Korea	1–3	Netherlands	15–9	12–15	5–15	11–15		43–54
14 Jun	Russia	1–3	Cuba	9–15	16–14	6–15	4–15		35–59
15 Jun	South Korea	0–3	Netherlands	8–15	6–15	9–15			23–45
20 Jun	Russia	3–0	South Korea	15–10	15–8	15–2			45–20
20 Jun	Cuba	3–1	Netherlands	15–8	15–12	15–17	15–8		60–45
21 Jun	Russia	3–0	South Korea	15–7	15–8	15–4			45–19
21 Jun	Cuba	2–3	Netherlands	15–10	12–15	15–13	4–15	10–15	56–68

== Final round ==
- Venue: Olimpiyskiy Stadium, Moscow, Russia

=== Pool play ===
- Teams from the same pool of Intercontinental Round will not play. Russia will be considered as the runners-up of Pool B.

Pos	Team	Pld	W	L	Pts	SW	SL	SR	SPW	SPL	SPR	Qualification
1	Italy	4	3	1	7	10	4	2.500	198	157	1.261	Final
2	Cuba	4	3	1	7	10	5	2.000	202	172	1.174	Final
3	Netherlands	4	3	1	7	9	8	1.125	195	227	0.859	3rd place match
4	Russia	4	2	2	6	8	8	1.000	205	181	1.133	3rd place match
5	Brazil	4	1	3	5	3	9	0.333	141	159	0.887	
6	Bulgaria	4	0	4	4	6	12	0.500	197	242	0.814	

Date		Score		Set 1	Set 2	Set 3	Set 4	Set 5	Total
30 Jun	Netherlands	3–1	Italy	15–11	15–13	8–15	15–10		53–49
30 Jun	Cuba	3–0	Brazil	15–11	15–11	15–9			45–31
30 Jun	Bulgaria	2–3	Russia	9–15	15–11	3–15	15–11	7–15	49–67
1 Jul	Bulgaria	2–3	Cuba	4–15	15–11	12–15	15–9	13–15	59–65
1 Jul	Italy	3–0	Brazil	15–12	15–8	15–12			45–32
1 Jul	Russia	2–3	Netherlands	15–17	15–3	15–4	11–15	13–15	69–54
2 Jul	Italy	3–0	Bulgaria	15–11	15–5	15–9			45–25
2 Jul	Brazil	3–0	Netherlands	15–13	15–8	15–2			45–23
2 Jul	Cuba	3–0	Russia	15–11	15–7	15–5			45–23
4 Jul	Netherlands	3–2	Bulgaria	15–9	15–13	13–15	7–15	15–12	65–64
4 Jul	Italy	3–1	Cuba	14–16	15–11	15–12	15–8		59–47
4 Jul	Russia	3–0	Brazil	15–11	16–14	15–8			46–33

=== Finals ===
==== 3rd place match ====
Date		Score		Set 1	Set 2	Set 3	Set 4	Set 5	Total
5 Jul	Netherlands	0–3	Russia	8–15	12–15	8–15			28–45

==== Final ====
Date		Score		Set 1	Set 2	Set 3	Set 4	Set 5	Total
5 Jul	Italy	3–0	Cuba	15–8	15–5	15–10			45–23

== Final standing ==
Rank	Team
1st place, gold medalist(s)	Italy
2nd place, silver medalist(s)	Cuba
3rd place, bronze medalist(s)	Russia
4	Netherlands
5	Brazil
6	Bulgaria
7	Yugoslavia
8	Argentina
9	Spain
10	China
11	South Korea
12	Japan

1997 World League champions

Italy
6th title

== Awards ==
- MVP
  - (Netherlands) Guido Görtzen
- Best scorer
  - (Netherlands) Guido Görtzen
- Best spiker
  - (Netherlands) Bas van de Goor
- Best server
  - (Cuba) Ramón Gato
- Best blocker
  - (Cuba) Ihosvany Hernández
