= 1999 FIVB Volleyball World League =

International sport competition

1999 World League
Tournament details
- Host country: Argentina (Final)
- Dates: 28 May – 17 July
- Teams: 12

Final positions
- Champions: Italy (7th title)

Tournament awards
- MVP: (Cuba) Osvaldo Hernández

The 1999 FIVB Volleyball World League was the tenth edition of the annual men's international volleyball tournament, played by 12 countries from 28 May to 17 July 1999. The Final Round was held in Mar del Plata, Argentina.

== Pools composition ==
Pool A	Pool B	Pool C
Australia; Italy; Poland; Russia	Brazil; Canada; Netherlands; Spain	Argentina; Cuba; France; Portugal

== Intercontinental round ==
=== Pool A ===
Pos	Team	Pld	W	L	Pts	SW	SL	SR	SPW	SPL	SPR	Qualification
1	Russia	12	10	2	22	32	14	2.286	1082	1010	1.071	Final round
2	Italy	12	9	3	21	31	14	2.214	1079	940	1.148	Final round
3	Poland	12	5	7	17	21	25	0.840	1006	1065	0.945	
4	Australia	12	0	12	12	5	36	0.139	860	1012	0.850	

Date		Score		Set 1	Set 2	Set 3	Set 4	Set 5	Total
28 May	Poland	0–3	Russia	22–25	15–25	16–25			53–75
28 May	Australia	0–3	Italy	20–25	15–25	18–25			53–75
29 May	Poland	1–3	Russia	19–25	25–22	23–25	19–25		86–97
29 May	Australia	0–3	Italy	11–25	22–25	20–25			53–75
4 Jun	Russia	3–0	Poland	25–18	28–26	25–23			78–67
4 Jun	Italy	3–0	Australia	25–17	25–21	25–20			75–58
5 Jun	Russia	3–2	Poland	23–25	21–25	25–19	25–23	15–8	109–100
6 Jun	Italy	3–0	Australia	25–22	25–22	25–21			75–65
11 Jun	Russia	3–0	Australia	25–19	25–20	27–25			77–64
11 Jun	Italy	2–3	Poland	27–29	24–26	25–14	25–19	13–15	114–103
12 Jun	Russia	3–0	Australia	25–17	33–31	25–23			83–71
13 Jun	Italy	3–1	Poland	25–20	25–19	22–25	25–18		97–82
18 Jun	Russia	3–1	Italy	29–27	25–21	27–29	25–20		106–97
18 Jun	Poland	3–1	Australia	28–30	29–27	25–23	25–18		107–98
19 Jun	Russia	1–3	Italy	22–25	18–25	25–20	21–25		86–95
19 Jun	Poland	3–0	Australia	25–20	25–15	25–18			75–53
25 Jun	Italy	1–3	Russia	18–25	21–25	25–16	24–26		88–92
25 Jun	Australia	0–3	Poland	21–25	23–25	26–28			70–78
26 Jun	Australia	1–3	Poland	25–16	17–25	23–25	18–25		83–91
27 Jun	Italy	3–1	Russia	25–18	25–14	22–25	25–21		97–78
2 Jul	Poland	2–3	Italy	18–25	31–29	25–21	17–25	12–15	103–115
2 Jul	Australia	2–3	Russia	25–18	23–25	25–20	22–25	7–15	102–103
3 Jul	Poland	0–3	Italy	24–26	21–25	16–25			61–76
3 Jul	Australia	1–3	Russia	18–25	24–26	25–22	23–25		90–98

=== Pool B ===
Pos	Team	Pld	W	L	Pts	SW	SL	SR	SPW	SPL	SPR	Qualification
1	Brazil	12	10	2	22	34	14	2.429	1150	1020	1.127	Final round
2	Spain	12	7	5	19	26	23	1.130	1094	1080	1.013	Final round
3	Canada	12	5	7	17	19	25	0.760	982	1041	0.943	
4	Netherlands	12	2	10	14	15	32	0.469	1022	1107	0.923	

Date		Score		Set 1	Set 2	Set 3	Set 4	Set 5	Total
28 May	Canada	1–3	Brazil	23–25	25–22	21–25	17–25		86–97
29 May	Netherlands	1–3	Spain	24–26	25–22	21–25	19–25		89–98
29 May	Canada	3–2	Brazil	26–24	42–44	25–18	16–25	19–17	128–128
30 May	Netherlands	3–2	Spain	25–27	14–25	25–22	30–28	15–11	109–113
4 Jun	Spain	3–2	Brazil	25–21	33–31	19–25	19–25	15–11	111–113
4 Jun	Canada	3–0	Netherlands	25–23	25–22	25–18			75–63
5 Jun	Canada	3–0	Netherlands	25–20	30–28	25–20			80–68
6 Jun	Spain	1–3	Brazil	25–21	22–25	19–25	23–25		89–96
11 Jun	Canada	3–2	Spain	25–19	18–25	19–25	26–24	15–10	103–103
12 Jun	Netherlands	2–3	Brazil	25–20	22–25	18–25	25–22	11–15	101–107
12 Jun	Canada	1–3	Spain	19–25	23–25	25–18	19–25		86–93
13 Jun	Netherlands	2–3	Brazil	27–29	25–22	23–25	25–23	11–15	111–114
18 Jun	Spain	3–2	Netherlands	22–25	25–16	23–25	25–21	15–12	110–99
19 Jun	Brazil	3–0	Canada	25–18	25–20	25–20			75–58
20 Jun	Brazil	3–0	Canada	25–18	25–21	25–13			75–52
20 Jun	Spain	3–0	Netherlands	25–18	25–20	25–23			75–61
26 Jun	Brazil	3–0	Spain	25–23	25–19	25–12			75–54
26 Jun	Netherlands	3–0	Canada	25–19	28–26	25–20			78–65
27 Jun	Brazil	3–0	Spain	25–22	25–15	25–19			75–56
27 Jun	Netherlands	0–3	Canada	23–25	23–25	23–25			69–75
1 Jul	Spain	3–2	Canada	23–25	25–22	26–28	26–24	16–14	116–113
2 Jul	Spain	3–0	Canada	26–24	25–19	25–18			76–61
3 Jul	Brazil	3–1	Netherlands	25–15	27–25	22–25	25–20		99–85
4 Jul	Brazil	3–1	Netherlands	25–23	25–22	21–25	25–19		96–89

=== Pool C ===
Pos	Team	Pld	W	L	Pts	SW	SL	SR	SPW	SPL	SPR	Qualification
1	Cuba	12	11	1	23	33	15	2.200	1130	1042	1.084	Final round
2	France	12	5	7	17	25	26	0.962	1125	1151	0.977	
3	Argentina (Note: Qualified as hosts) (H)	12	4	8	16	22	26	0.846	1076	1089	0.988	Final round
4	Portugal	12	4	8	16	17	30	0.567	1034	1083	0.955	

(H) Host
Notes:

Date		Score		Set 1	Set 2	Set 3	Set 4	Set 5	Total
28 May	France	2–3	Portugal	24–26	23–25	25–23	16–25	9–15	97–114
29 May	Argentina	1–3	Cuba	20–25	19–25	25–22	22–25		86–97
30 May	France	3–1	Portugal	28–26	22–25	25–17	25–18		100–86
30 May	Argentina	0–3	Cuba	26–28	22–25	28–30			76–83
4 Jun	Cuba	3–1	Portugal	25–23	22–25	26–24	25–20		98–92
5 Jun	Argentina	3–2	France	25–22	23–25	25–21	22–25	19–17	114–110
5 Jun	Cuba	3–0	Portugal	25–21	25–21	25–22			75–64
6 Jun	Argentina	1–3	France	23–25	23–25	25–13	22–25		93–88
11 Jun	Cuba	3–2	France	26–28	20–25	25–23	25–20	17–15	113–111
12 Jun	Argentina	2–3	Portugal	25–21	21–25	25–23	24–26	15–17	110–112
12 Jun	Cuba	3–2	France	22–25	25–16	23–25	25–21	16–14	111–101
13 Jun	Argentina	3–0	Portugal	25–22	26–24	25–18			76–64
18 Jun	France	1–3	Cuba	22–25	34–32	22–25	22–25		100–107
19 Jun	Portugal	3–1	Argentina	25–27	25–13	25–16	25–17		100–73
20 Jun	France	1–3	Cuba	25–20	17–25	19–25	13–25		74–95
20 Jun	Portugal	3–1	Argentina	25–21	25–22	26–28	25–22		101–93
25 Jun	France	3–2	Argentina	25–23	22–25	22–25	25–19	15–12	109–104
26 Jun	Portugal	2–3	Cuba	19–25	25–23	25–23	21–25	10–15	100–111
27 Jun	France	0–3	Argentina	21–25	19–25	22–25			62–75
27 Jun	Portugal	0–3	Cuba	19–25	18–25	25–27			62–77
1 Jul	Portugal	0–3	France	15–25	16–25	23–25			54–75
2 Jul	Cuba	3–2	Argentina	16–25	25–22	25–21	21–25	15–7	102–100
3 Jul	Portugal	1–3	France	20–25	25–23	20–25	20–25		85–98
3 Jul	Cuba	0–3	Argentina	16–25	24–26	21–25			61–76

== Final round ==
- Venue: Polideportivo Islas Malvinas, Mar del Plata, Argentina

=== Pool play ===
==== Pool D ====
Pos	Team	Pld	W	L	Pts	SW	SL	SR	SPW	SPL	SPR	Qualification
1	Russia	2	2	0	4	6	4	1.500	219	207	1.058	Semifinals
2	Cuba	2	1	1	3	5	3	1.667	179	157	1.140	Semifinals
3	Spain	2	0	2	2	2	6	0.333	156	190	0.821	

Date		Score		Set 1	Set 2	Set 3	Set 4	Set 5	Total
12 Jul	Spain	0–3	Cuba	17–25	19–25	17–25			53–75
13 Jul	Cuba	2–3	Russia	23–25	25–16	20–25	25–23	11–15	104–104
14 Jul	Russia	3–2	Spain	25–17	24–26	26–28	25–20	15–12	115–103

==== Pool E ====
Pos	Team	Pld	W	L	Pts	SW	SL	SR	SPW	SPL	SPR	Qualification
1	Brazil	2	2	0	4	6	2	3.000	176	157	1.121	Semifinals
2	Italy	2	1	1	3	5	4	1.250	198	189	1.048	Semifinals
3	Argentina	2	0	2	2	1	6	0.167	140	168	0.833	

Date		Score		Set 1	Set 2	Set 3	Set 4	Set 5	Total
12 Jul	Argentina	0–3	Brazil	18–25	15–25	19–25			52–75
13 Jul	Brazil	3–2	Italy	18–25	25–22	25–20	18–25	15–13	101–105
14 Jul	Italy	3–1	Argentina	25–22	25–18	18–25	25–23		93–88

=== Final four ===
Semifinals
16 July
Russia	1
Italy	3
16 July
Brazil	0
Cuba	3

Final
17 July
Italy	3
Cuba	1
3rd place match
17 July
Russia	1
Brazil	3

==== Semifinals ====
Date		Score		Set 1	Set 2	Set 3	Set 4	Set 5	Total
16 Jul	Russia	1–3	Italy	25–18	19–25	24–26	20–25		88–94
16 Jul	Brazil	0–3	Cuba	20–25	25–27	19–25			64–77

==== 3rd place match ====
Date		Score		Set 1	Set 2	Set 3	Set 4	Set 5	Total
17 Jul	Russia	1–3	Brazil	25–17	23–25	20–25	19–25		87–92

==== Final ====
Date		Score		Set 1	Set 2	Set 3	Set 4	Set 5	Total
17 Jul	Italy	3–1	Cuba	25–21	23–25	25–19	26–24		99–89

== Final standing ==
Rank	Team
1st place, gold medalist(s)	Italy
2nd place, silver medalist(s)	Cuba
3rd place, bronze medalist(s)	Brazil
4	Russia
5	Spain
6	Argentina
7	France
8	Canada
8	Poland
10	Australia
10	Netherlands
10	Portugal

1999 World League champions

Italy
7th title

== Awards ==
- Most valuable player
  - (Cuba) Osvaldo Hernández
- Best scorer
  - (Brazil) Douglas Chiarotti
- Best libero
  - (Italy) Mirko Corsano
- Best blocker
  - (Cuba) Pavel Pimienta
- Best setter
  - (Cuba) Raúl Diago
- Best server
  - (Italy) Luigi Mastrangelo
- Best receiver
  - (Spain) Enrique de la Fuente
