= Volleyball at the 1999 Pan American Games =

- Dates: July 24 to August 2, 1999

This page presents the results of the Men's and Women's Volleyball Tournament during the 1999 Pan American Games, which was held from July 24 to August 2, 1999, in Winnipeg, Manitoba, Canada. There were four medal events, two (indoor and beach) for both men and women.

== Men's indoor tournament ==
=== Preliminary round ===
==== Group A ====
	Team	Points	G	W	L	SW	SL	Ratio
1.	Brazil	6	3	3	0	9	3	3.000
2.	Cuba	5	3	2	1	8	3	2.666
3.	Venezuela	4	3	1	2	4	6	0.666
4.	Barbados	3	3	0	3	0	9	0.000

- July 24

Cuba	2 – 3	Brazil	17-25 25-11 25-19 26-28 10-15
Venezuela	3 – 0	Barbados	25-08 25-16 29-27

- July 26

Brazil	3 – 0	Barbados	25-11 25-18 25-17
Cuba	3 – 0	Venezuela	25-21 25-23 25-22

- July 27

Cuba	3 – 0	Barbados	25-22 25-18 25-21
Brazil	3 – 1	Venezuela	25-21 22-25 25-15 25-19

==== Group B ====
	Team	Points	G	W	L	SW	SL	Ratio
1.	Argentina	6	3	3	0	9	1	9.000
2.	Canada	4	3	1	2	6	6	1.000
3.	Colombia	4	3	1	2	5	8	0.625
4.	United States	4	3	1	2	3	8	0.375

- July 25

Canada	2 – 3	Colombia	25-19 20-25 25-18 22-25 10-15
United States	0 – 3	Argentina	19-25 19-25 20-25

- July 26

United States	3 – 2	Colombia	25-10 17-25 16-25 25-19 15-12
Canada	1 – 3	Argentina	20-25 25-23 17-25 23-25

- July 28

Canada	3 – 0	United States	25-18 25-15 25-21
Argentina	3 – 0	Colombia	25-17 25-19 25-20

=== Classification round ===
==== Fifth to eighth place ====
- July 30

Colombia	3 – 0	Barbados	25-20 25-23 25-23
Venezuela	3 – 0	United States	25-21 28-26 25-22

==== Seventh place ====
- July 31

United States	3 – 0	Barbados	25-15 25-23 25-18

==== Fifth place ====
- July 31

Colombia	0 – 3	Venezuela	16-25 20-25 22-25

=== Semi-finals ===
- July 31

Argentina	1 – 3	Cuba	25-20 25-23 25-23
Brazil	3 – 0	Canada	25-16 27-25 25-16

=== Bronze-medal match ===
- August 2

Argentina	1 – 3	Canada	25-22 19-25 26-28 23-25

=== Gold-medal match ===
- August 2

Brazil	2 – 3	Cuba	20-25 25-14 25-17 23-25 12-15

=== Final standings ===
1. Cuba
2. Brazil
3. Canada
4. Argentina
5. Venezuela
6. Colombia
7. United States
8. Barbados

1999 Pan American Games winners

Cuba
Fifth title

== Women's indoor tournament ==
=== Round robin ===
	Team	Points	G	W	L	SW	SL	Ratio
1.	Brazil	10	5	5	0	15	2	7.500
2.	Cuba	9	5	4	1	14	3	4.666
3.	United States	8	5	3	2	9	11	0.818
4.	Dominican Republic	7	5	2	3	8	11	0.727
5.	Peru	6	5	1	4	5	13	0.384
6.	Canada	5	5	0	5	4	15	0.266

- July 23

Brazil	3 – 0	Peru	25-15 25-23 25-17
Canada	1 – 3	Dominican Republic	22-25 20-25 25-18 24-26
United States	0 – 3	Cuba	11-25 14-25 18-25

- July 24

Peru	1 – 3	Dominican Republic	25-22 11-25 14-25 23-25
United States	0 – 3	Brazil	20-25 17-25 23-25
Canada	0 – 3	Cuba	14-25 21-25 21-25

- July 25

Cuba	3 – 0	Dominican Republic	25-22 25-19 25-12
Canada	0 – 3	Brazil	21-25 16-25 18-25
Peru	1 – 3	United States	14-25 14-25 25-20 19-25

- July 27

Brazil	3 – 0	Dominican Republic	25-23 25-23 25-17
United States	3 – 2	Canada	25-23 11-25 20-25 25-18 15-09
Cuba	3 – 0	Peru	25-14 25-22 25-17

- July 28

United States	3 – 2	Dominican Republic	25-19 22-25 21-25 25-20 15-09
Canada	1 – 3	Peru	19-25 23-25 26-24 25-27
Cuba	2 – 3	Brazil	25-23 19-25 25-17 22-25 13-15

=== Fifth place ===
- July 30

Peru	1 – 3	Canada	20-25 25-21 22-25 22-25

=== Semi-finals ===
- July 30

Brazil	3 – 0	Dominican Republic	25-20 25-13 25-12
Cuba	3 – 0	United States	25-20 25-21 25-23

=== Bronze-medal match ===
- August 1

Dominican Republic	0 – 3	United States	26-28 19-25 12-25

=== Gold-medal match ===
- August 1

Brazil	3 – 2	Cuba	20-25 25-22 25-27 25-22 15-13

=== Final standings ===
1. Brazil
2. Cuba
3. United States
4. Dominican Republic
5. Canada
6. Peru

1999 Pan American Games winners

Brazil
Third title

=== Medal table ===
* Host nation (Canada)

Rank	Nation	Gold	Silver	Bronze	Total
1	Brazil	1	1	0	2
1	Cuba	1	1	0	2
3	Canada*	0	0	1	1
3	United States	0	0	1	1
Totals (4 entries)		2	2	2	6
