= 1998 FIVB Volleyball World League =

International sport competition

1998 World League
Tournament details
- Host country: Italy (Final)
- Dates: 15 May – 19 July
- Teams: 12

Final positions
- Champions: Cuba (1st title)

Tournament awards
- MVP: (Cuba) Osvaldo Hernández

The 1998 FIVB Volleyball World League was the ninth edition of the annual men's international volleyball tournament, played by 12 countries from 15 May to 19 July 1998. The Final Round was held in Milan, Italy.

== Pools composition ==
| Pool A | Pool B | Pool C |
|---|---|---|
| Bulgaria; Cuba; South Korea; Spain | Argentina; Greece; Italy; Netherlands | Brazil; Poland; Russia; Yugoslavia |

== Intercontinental round ==
| Qualified for the Playoff round |
| Qualified as hosts for the final round |
| Qualified as hosts for the Playoff round |

=== Pool A ===
| Pos | Team | Pld | W | L | Pts | SW | SL | SR | SPW | SPL | SPR | Qualification |
|---|---|---|---|---|---|---|---|---|---|---|---|---|
| 1 | Bulgaria | 12 | 10 | 2 | 22 | 30 | 15 | 2.000 | 581 | 501 | 1.160 | Pool East |
| 2 | Cuba | 12 | 8 | 4 | 20 | 29 | 15 | 1.933 | 603 | 463 | 1.302 | Pool East |
| 3 | Spain | 12 | 4 | 8 | 16 | 18 | 29 | 0.621 | 542 | 634 | 0.855 | Pool West |
| 4 | South Korea | 12 | 2 | 10 | 14 | 12 | 30 | 0.400 | 439 | 567 | 0.774 | |

| Date | | Score | | Set 1 | Set 2 | Set 3 | Set 4 | Set 5 | Total |
|---|---|---|---|---|---|---|---|---|---|
| 15 May | Cuba | 3–0 | South Korea | 15–7 | 15–4 | 15–4 | | | 45–15 |
| 15 May | Spain | 2–3 | Bulgaria | 6–15 | 15–8 | 15–8 | 9–15 | 15–17 | 60–63 |
| 16 May | Cuba | 3–0 | South Korea | 15–4 | 15–11 | 15–10 | | | 45–25 |
| 17 May | Spain | 1–3 | Bulgaria | 10–15 | 10–15 | 15–11 | 11–15 | | 46–56 |
| 22 May | Cuba | 3–0 | Bulgaria | 15–8 | 15–5 | 15–7 | | | 45–20 |
| 23 May | South Korea | 3–0 | Spain | 15–6 | 16–14 | 15–9 | | | 46–29 |
| 23 May | Cuba | 3–0 | Bulgaria | 15–8 | 15–10 | 15–5 | | | 45–23 |
| 24 May | South Korea | 3–0 | Spain | 15–5 | 15–8 | 15–6 | | | 45–19 |
| 29 May | Bulgaria | 3–0 | South Korea | 15–8 | 15–9 | 15–4 | | | 45–21 |
| 29 May | Spain | 3–0 | Cuba | 15–11 | 15–12 | 15–12 | | | 45–35 |
| 30 May | Bulgaria | 3–1 | South Korea | 13–15 | 15–6 | 15–11 | 15–8 | | 58–40 |
| 31 May | Spain | 3–2 | Cuba | 15–4 | 8–15 | 17–16 | 7–15 | 15–13 | 62–63 |
| 5 Jun | Bulgaria | 3–0 | Spain | 15–11 | 15–12 | 15–7 | | | 45–30 |
| 6 Jun | South Korea | 0–3 | Cuba | 8–15 | 3–15 | 13–15 | | | 24–45 |
| 6 Jun | Bulgaria | 3–0 | Spain | 15–2 | 15–6 | 15–7 | | | 45–15 |
| 7 Jun | South Korea | 0–3 | Cuba | 7–15 | 7–15 | 9–15 | | | 23–45 |
| 12 Jun | Cuba | 3–2 | Spain | 13–15 | 12–15 | 15–13 | 15–10 | 15–10 | 70–63 |
| 13 Jun | South Korea | 1–3 | Bulgaria | 15–5 | 11–15 | 6–15 | 14–16 | | 46–51 |
| 13 Jun | Cuba | 3–1 | Spain | 16–14 | 9–15 | 15–6 | 15–9 | | 55–44 |
| 14 Jun | South Korea | 1–3 | Bulgaria | 9–15 | 9–15 | 15–11 | 11–15 | | 44–56 |
| 19 Jun | Spain | 3–2 | South Korea | 13–15 | 15–12 | 15–10 | 11–15 | 15–13 | 69–65 |
| 20 Jun | Bulgaria | 3–1 | Cuba | 15–13 | 15–9 | 13–15 | 15–8 | | 58–45 |
| 21 Jun | Spain | 3–1 | South Korea | 15–13 | 15–9 | 13–15 | 15–8 | | 58–45 |
| 21 Jun | Bulgaria | 3–2 | Cuba | 15–12 | 15–8 | 7–15 | 8–15 | 16–14 | 61–64 |

=== Pool B ===
| Pos | Team | Pld | W | L | Pts | SW | SL | SR | SPW | SPL | SPR | Qualification |
|---|---|---|---|---|---|---|---|---|---|---|---|---|
| 1 | Netherlands | 12 | 10 | 2 | 22 | 30 | 11 | 2.727 | 553 | 433 | 1.277 | Pool West |
| 2 | Italy (Note: Qualified as hosts) (H) | 12 | 7 | 5 | 19 | 24 | 17 | 1.412 | 544 | 471 | 1.155 | Final round |
| 3 | Argentina | 12 | 5 | 7 | 17 | 22 | 25 | 0.880 | 583 | 585 | 0.997 | |
| 4 | Greece | 12 | 2 | 10 | 14 | 10 | 33 | 0.303 | 419 | 610 | 0.687 | |

(H) Host
Notes:

| Date | | Score | | Set 1 | Set 2 | Set 3 | Set 4 | Set 5 | Total |
|---|---|---|---|---|---|---|---|---|---|
| 15 May | Argentina | 0–3 | Netherlands | 11–15 | 10–15 | 4–15 | | | 25–45 |
| 16 May | Italy | 3–0 | Greece | 15–7 | 15–9 | 15–10 | | | 45–26 |
| 17 May | Argentina | 0–3 | Netherlands | 13–15 | 12–15 | 13–15 | | | 38–45 |
| 17 May | Italy | 3–0 | Greece | 15–1 | 15–8 | 15–5 | | | 45–14 |
| 22 May | Italy | 2–3 | Argentina | 7–15 | 12–15 | 16–14 | 16–14 | 13–15 | 64–73 |
| 23 May | Greece | 1–3 | Netherlands | 11–15 | 3–15 | 15–13 | 6–15 | | 35–58 |
| 24 May | Italy | 3–1 | Argentina | 13–15 | 16–14 | 16–14 | 15–8 | | 60–51 |
| 24 May | Greece | 1–3 | Netherlands | 12–15 | 7–15 | 15–13 | 8–15 | | 42–58 |
| 29 May | Argentina | 2–3 | Greece | 13–15 | 10–15 | 15–9 | 15–8 | 13–15 | 66–62 |
| 30 May | Italy | 0–3 | Netherlands | 11–15 | 9–15 | 9–15 | | | 29–45 |
| 31 May | Argentina | 1–3 | Greece | 12–15 | 16–14 | 13–15 | 12–15 | | 53–59 |
| 31 May | Italy | 3–0 | Netherlands | 15–7 | 15–10 | 15–13 | | | 45–30 |
| 5 Jun | Argentina | 3–1 | Italy | 15–11 | 8–15 | 15–6 | 15–13 | | 53–45 |
| 6 Jun | Netherlands | 3–0 | Greece | 15–7 | 15–5 | 15–9 | | | 45–21 |
| 7 Jun | Netherlands | 3–0 | Greece | 15–5 | 15–8 | 15–9 | | | 45–22 |
| 7 Jun | Argentina | 3–0 | Italy | 15–13 | 15–13 | 15–8 | | | 45–34 |
| 13 Jun | Netherlands | 3–1 | Argentina | 15–9 | 9–15 | 15–12 | 15–4 | | 54–40 |
| 13 Jun | Greece | 1–3 | Italy | 9–15 | 15–4 | 5–15 | 13–15 | | 42–49 |
| 14 Jun | Netherlands | 3–2 | Argentina | 15–7 | 3–15 | 5–15 | 15–2 | 15–12 | 53–51 |
| 14 Jun | Greece | 0–3 | Italy | 6–15 | 11–15 | 13–15 | | | 30–45 |
| 20 Jun | Netherlands | 0–3 | Italy | 8–15 | 9–15 | 11–15 | | | 28–45 |
| 20 Jun | Greece | 1–3 | Argentina | 15–11 | 12–15 | 11–15 | 15–17 | | 53–58 |
| 21 Jun | Netherlands | 3–0 | Italy | 15–13 | 15–12 | 17–15 | | | 47–40 |
| 21 Jun | Greece | 0–3 | Argentina | 5–15 | 4–15 | 6–15 | | | 15–45 |

=== Pool C ===
| Pos | Team | Pld | W | L | Pts | SW | SL | SR | SPW | SPL | SPR | Qualification |
|---|---|---|---|---|---|---|---|---|---|---|---|---|
| 1 | Brazil | 12 | 9 | 3 | 21 | 29 | 11 | 2.636 | 536 | 420 | 1.276 | Pool West |
| 2 | Russia | 12 | 9 | 3 | 21 | 30 | 17 | 1.765 | 633 | 519 | 1.220 | Pool West |
| 3 | Yugoslavia | 12 | 3 | 9 | 15 | 18 | 28 | 0.643 | 519 | 600 | 0.865 | Pool East |
| 4 | Poland | 12 | 3 | 9 | 15 | 12 | 33 | 0.364 | 469 | 618 | 0.759 | |

| Date | | Score | | Set 1 | Set 2 | Set 3 | Set 4 | Set 5 | Total |
|---|---|---|---|---|---|---|---|---|---|
| 15 May | Russia | 2–3 | Poland | 15–11 | 15–7 | 16–17 | 12–15 | 11–15 | 69–65 |
| 15 May | Brazil | 3–0 | Yugoslavia | 15–8 | 15–9 | 15–7 | | | 45–24 |
| 16 May | Russia | 3–0 | Poland | 15–5 | 15–11 | 15–12 | | | 45–28 |
| 17 May | Brazil | 3–0 | Yugoslavia | 15–11 | 16–14 | 15–5 | | | 46–30 |
| 22 May | Yugoslavia | 1–3 | Russia | 6–15 | 12–15 | 15–13 | 8–15 | | 41–58 |
| 22 May | Brazil | 3–0 | Poland | 15–6 | 15–12 | 15–6 | | | 45–24 |
| 23 May | Yugoslavia | 0–3 | Russia | 11–15 | 13–15 | 4–15 | | | 28–45 |
| 24 May | Brazil | 3–0 | Poland | 15–8 | 15–8 | 16–14 | | | 46–30 |
| 29 May | Yugoslavia | 3–0 | Poland | 15–4 | 15–13 | 15–13 | | | 45–30 |
| 29 May | Brazil | 3–0 | Russia | 15–12 | 15–12 | 15–7 | | | 45–31 |
| 30 May | Yugoslavia | 2–3 | Poland | 9–15 | 15–12 | 8–15 | 15–8 | 16–14 | 63–64 |
| 31 May | Brazil | 3–1 | Russia | 15–9 | 15–6 | 11–15 | 15–8 | | 56–38 |
| 5 Jun | Russia | 3–2 | Yugoslavia | 15–6 | 12–15 | 15–2 | 13–15 | 15–12 | 70–50 |
| 5 Jun | Poland | 1–3 | Brazil | 10–15 | 8–15 | 15–12 | 13–15 | | 46–57 |
| 6 Jun | Russia | 3–2 | Yugoslavia | 16–14 | 15–12 | 13–15 | 8–15 | 15–11 | 67–67 |
| 6 Jun | Poland | 0–3 | Brazil | 6–15 | 8–15 | 5–15 | | | 19–45 |
| 12 Jun | Poland | 0–3 | Russia | 11–15 | 7–15 | 3–15 | | | 21–45 |
| 12 Jun | Yugoslavia | 3–0 | Brazil | 15–7 | 15–10 | 15–8 | | | 45–25 |
| 13 Jun | Poland | 1–3 | Russia | 15–7 | 6–15 | 5–15 | 11–15 | | 37–52 |
| 14 Jun | Yugoslavia | 0–3 | Brazil | 6–15 | 11–15 | 3–15 | | | 20–45 |
| 19 Jun | Russia | 3–1 | Brazil | 15–13 | 15–6 | 11–15 | 15–11 | | 56–45 |
| 19 Jun | Poland | 3–2 | Yugoslavia | 11–15 | 11–15 | 15–6 | 15–12 | 15–9 | 67–57 |
| 20 Jun | Russia | 3–1 | Brazil | 12–15 | 15–3 | 15–8 | 15–10 | | 57–36 |
| 20 Jun | Poland | 1–3 | Yugoslavia | 5–15 | 15–6 | 5–15 | 11–15 | | 36–51 |

== Playoff round ==
=== Pool West ===
- Host: Alicante, Spain

| Pos | Team | Pld | W | L | Pts | SW | SL | SR | SPW | SPL | SPR | Qualification |
|---|---|---|---|---|---|---|---|---|---|---|---|---|
| 1 | Russia | 3 | 2 | 1 | 5 | 6 | 3 | 2.000 | 115 | 112 | 1.027 | Final round |
| 2 | Netherlands | 3 | 2 | 1 | 5 | 7 | 5 | 1.400 | 147 | 145 | 1.014 | Final round |
| 3 | Brazil | 3 | 1 | 2 | 4 | 5 | 6 | 0.833 | 139 | 133 | 1.045 | |
| 4 | Spain | 3 | 1 | 2 | 4 | 3 | 7 | 0.429 | 117 | 128 | 0.914 | |

| Date | | Score | | Set 1 | Set 2 | Set 3 | Set 4 | Set 5 | Total |
|---|---|---|---|---|---|---|---|---|---|
| 13 Jul | Netherlands | 3–2 | Brazil | 7–15 | 15–13 | 12–15 | 15–7 | 15–13 | 64–63 |
| 13 Jul | Spain | 0–3 | Russia | 13–15 | 11–15 | 12–15 | | | 36–45 |
| 14 Jul | Netherlands | 3–0 | Russia | 15–10 | 15–7 | 15–8 | | | 45–25 |
| 14 Jul | Spain | 0–3 | Brazil | 10–15 | 7–15 | 7–15 | | | 24–45 |
| 15 Jul | Brazil | 0–3 | Russia | 10–15 | 9–15 | 12–15 | | | 31–45 |
| 15 Jul | Spain | 3–1 | Netherlands | 12–15 | 15–5 | 15–12 | 15–6 | | 57–38 |

=== Pool East ===
- Host: (Federal Republic of Yugoslavia) Belgrade, Yugoslavia

| Pos | Team | Pld | W | L | Pts | SW | SL | SR | SPW | SPL | SPR | Qualification |
|---|---|---|---|---|---|---|---|---|---|---|---|---|
| 1 | Cuba | 2 | 2 | 0 | 4 | 6 | 2 | 3.000 | 109 | 67 | 1.627 | Final round |
| 2 | Yugoslavia | 2 | 1 | 1 | 3 | 5 | 4 | 1.250 | 106 | 108 | 0.981 | |
| 3 | Bulgaria | 2 | 0 | 2 | 2 | 1 | 6 | 0.167 | 58 | 98 | 0.592 | |

| Date | | Score | | Set 1 | Set 2 | Set 3 | Set 4 | Set 5 | Total |
|---|---|---|---|---|---|---|---|---|---|
| 13 Jul | Yugoslavia | 3–1 | Bulgaria | 6–15 | 17–15 | 15–7 | 15–7 | | 53–44 |
| 14 Jul | Cuba | 3–0 | Bulgaria | 15–3 | 15–2 | 15–9 | | | 45–14 |
| 15 Jul | Yugoslavia | 2–3 | Cuba | 6–15 | 15–12 | 5–15 | 15–7 | 12–15 | 53–64 |

== Final round ==
- Venue: Forum di Assago, Assago, Italy

| Pos | Team | Pld | W | L | Pts | SW | SL | SR | SPW | SPL | SPR |
|---|---|---|---|---|---|---|---|---|---|---|---|
| 1 | Cuba | 3 | 3 | 0 | 6 | 9 | 1 | 9.000 | 147 | 103 | 1.427 |
| 2 | Russia | 3 | 2 | 1 | 5 | 6 | 5 | 1.200 | 136 | 134 | 1.015 |
| 3 | Netherlands | 3 | 1 | 2 | 4 | 4 | 7 | 0.571 | 124 | 137 | 0.905 |
| 4 | Italy | 3 | 0 | 3 | 3 | 3 | 9 | 0.333 | 125 | 158 | 0.791 |

| Date | | Score | | Set 1 | Set 2 | Set 3 | Set 4 | Set 5 | Total |
|---|---|---|---|---|---|---|---|---|---|
| 17 Jul | Russia | 0–3 | Cuba | 15–17 | 13–15 | 4–15 | | | 32–47 |
| 17 Jul | Italy | 1–3 | Netherlands | 15–9 | 13–15 | 4–15 | 5–15 | | 37–54 |
| 18 Jul | Russia | 3–0 | Netherlands | 15–8 | 15–5 | 15–11 | | | 45–24 |
| 18 Jul | Italy | 0–3 | Cuba | 7–15 | 11–15 | 7–15 | | | 25–45 |
| 19 Jul | Netherlands | 1–3 | Cuba | 14–16 | 14–16 | 15–8 | 3–15 | | 46–55 |
| 19 Jul | Italy | 2–3 | Russia | 7–15 | 15–5 | 13–15 | 15–9 | 13–15 | 63–59 |

== Final standing ==
| Rank | Team |
|---|---|
| 1st place, gold medalist(s) | Cuba |
| 2nd place, silver medalist(s) | Russia |
| 3rd place, bronze medalist(s) | Netherlands |
| 4 | Italy |
| 5 | Brazil |
| 6 | Yugoslavia |
| 7 | Bulgaria |
| 8 | Spain |
| 9 | Argentina |
| 10 | Poland |
| 11 | South Korea |
| 12 | Greece |

1998 World League champions

Cuba
1st title

== Awards ==
- Best scorer: (Cuba) Osvaldo Hernández
- Best spiker: (Cuba) Osvaldo Hernández
- Best blocker: (Italy) Andrea Giani
- Best server: (Russia) Roman Yakovlyev
