= 1998 Central American and Caribbean Games =

Sports events held in Maracaibo, Venezuela

Central American and Caribbean Sports Games
- Host city: Maracaibo, Venezuela
- Motto: The Sun Games; Spanish: Los Juegos del Sol
- Edition: 18th
- Nations: 31
- Athletes: 5,200
- Opening: 8 August 1998
- Closing: 22 August 1998
- Opened by: Rafael Caldera
- Athlete's Oath: Julio Luna
- Torch lighter: Pedro Gamarro
- Main venue: Estadio José Pachencho Romero

The 18th Central American and Caribbean Games were held in Maracaibo, Venezuela from August 8 to August 22, 1998, and included 31 nations and a total of 5,200 competitors.

== Mascot ==
The mascot for the Games was a goajira boy, Wayuuchon.

== Sports ==
31 sports were contested at the 1998 Games:

- Archery
- Athletics
- Baseball
- Basketball
- Beach volleyball
- Bowling
- Boxing
- Cycling
- Equestrian
- Fencing
- Field hockey
- Football
- Gymnastics
- Judo
- Karate
- Racquetball
- Rhythmic gymnastics
- Rowing
- Sailing
- Shooting
- Softball
- Swimming
- Synchronized swimming
- Table tennis
- Taekwondo
- Tennis
- Triathlon
- Volleyball
- Water polo
- Weightlifting
- Wrestling

== Medals ==
* Host nation (Venezuela)

1998 Central American and Caribbean Games medal table
Rank	Nation	Gold	Silver	Bronze	Total
1	Cuba	191	74	69	334
2	Mexico	61	87	71	219
3	Venezuela*	56	68	67	191
4	Colombia	19	43	51	113
5	Puerto Rico	11	21	48	80
6	Dominican Republic	7	20	44	71
7	Suriname	7	1	0	8
8	Jamaica	6	13	10	29
9	El Salvador	4	11	22	37
10	Guatemala	3	11	22	36
11	Panama	3	6	4	13
12	Antigua and Barbuda	3	2	5	10
13	Costa Rica	2	3	5	10
14	Bahamas	2	2	4	8
14	Barbados	2	2	4	8
16	Trinidad and Tobago	1	8	5	14
17	British Virgin Islands	1	1	0	2
18	Nicaragua	0	2	6	8
19	Honduras	0	1	5	6
20	Haiti	0	0	3	3
21	Aruba	0	0	1	1
21	Guyana	0	0	1	1
Totals (22 entries)		379	376	447	1,202
