= Paris Saint-Germain Volleyball =

French professional volleyball club

Paris Saint-Germain
- Full name: Paris Saint-Germain Volleyball
- Short name: PSG-Asnières, PSG-Racing
- Founded: 1992
- Dissolved: 1998
- Ground: Salle Pierre Charpy (Capacity: 1,400)
- Chairman: Charles Biétry
- Manager: Eric N'Gapeth
- Captain: Christophe Meneau
- League: LNV Ligue A Masculine

Paris Saint-Germain Volleyball, commonly known as PSG-Asnières or PSG-Racing, was a French professional volleyball club based in Paris, France. It operated as the volleyball department of Paris Saint-Germain FC. It was founded as PSG-Asnières Volley in 1992, following the takeover of Asnières Sports, based in the Paris suburb of Asnières-sur-Seine, by PSG and its owners Canal+. The club competed in the top tier of French volleyball, the LNV Ligue A Masculine, until its dissolution in 1998. Throughout its existence, the team initially played its home fixtures at the Gymnase des Courtilles, before later moving to the Salle Pierre Charpy.

The club enjoyed immediate success following its creation. In its inaugural 1992–93 season, PSG-Asnières won the French championship, benefiting from the collapse of several established clubs and the recruitment of key players. The team remained competitive in subsequent seasons and came close to a domestic double in 1993–94, winning the Coupe de France and finishing runners-up in the league. During the 1994–95 season, PSG-Asnières won the prestigious Open Begay friendly tournament, finished runners-up in the Coupe de France, and achieved success at youth level by claiming the French Espoirs championship. The club also represented France in European competition, reaching the quarter-finals of the CEV Champions League in 1994 and the CEV Cup in 1995.

Ahead of the 1995–96 season, PSG withdrew from its partnership with Asnières and merged its top-flight licence with Racing Club de France, creating PSG-Racing Volley. This reorganisation led to significant changes in management, squad composition, and home venues, while Asnières restarted independently in the lower divisions. PSG-Racing continued to compete in Ligue A, undergoing major squad changes and recording mixed results in domestic league and cup competitions. Despite occasional strong performances and playoff appearances, PSG-Racing failed to replicate its early success, with its best achievements being a third-place league finish in 1998, quarter-final appearances in the Coupe de France in 1997 and 1998, and an underwhelming group-stage exit in the CEV Cup in 1996.

The club's future was ultimately decided off the court. In 1998, discussions between officials from PSG and Paris Université Club (PUC) intensified, with the aim of consolidating elite volleyball in the capital by creating a single, stable, and internationally competitive Parisian club. Despite initial administrative and financial obstacles, a protocol agreement was signed in July 1998, leading to the formation of Paris Volley. As part of this restructuring, PSG-Racing was dissolved, bringing an end to PSG's direct involvement in professional volleyball. Paris Volley subsequently went on to establish itself as one of the most successful clubs in French volleyball history.

== History ==
=== PSG takeover and French title ===
PSG-Asnières Volley began the 1992–93 season under almost miraculous circumstances. For volleyball in Paris, the takeover of Asnières Sports, based in the suburb of Asnières-sur-Seine, by Paris Saint-Germain FC and its owners Canal+, officially announced on 28 October 1992, represented a unique opportunity following the disappearance of the volleyball sections of Racing Club de France and Stade Français in 1991. Led by Charles Biétry, PSG's multisport project also included active sections in handball, judo, rugby league, boxing, and basketball.

Only weeks earlier, Asnières had been on the verge of relegation from the top flight, sitting ninth out of ten teams in the LNV Ligue A Masculine. The club ultimately benefited from the collapse of reigning French champions and Coupe de France winners Fréjus, who filed for bankruptcy due to severe financial difficulties, allowing Asnières to retain its place in the division. The newly formed Paris-based team also faced competition from the ambitious Paris Université Club (PUC), which was seeking promotion to Ligue A. PSG-Asnières struggled in the pre-season tournament, having begun preparations only fifteen days before the championship resumed, under the management of André Patin, who had previously served as manager of Asnières.

On 3 October 1992, despite the addition of two former Fréjus players, Gino Brousseau and Olivier Rossard, PSG-Asnières endured a difficult start to the league season, suffering five defeats in their first nine matches, including an opening home loss at the Gymnase des Courtilles against newly promoted Saint-Nazaire. The team's fortunes began to improve in December with the arrival of Russian star Dimitri Tsvetkov, a former Dynamo Moscow player, whose signing was made possible by the club's shirt sponsor, the mineral water brand Contrex.

PSG-Asnières subsequently set their sights on a place in the playoffs, an objective achieved by finishing fifth in the regular season with a record of twelve wins and ten losses. The Parisian club were initially eliminated by Sète in the preliminary round, and on 30 March, L'Équipe reported that the club's management was already preparing for the following season. However, during the repechage tournament, André Patin's side overcame Montpellier and Poitiers in closely contested matches to secure a place in the qualification tournament for the finals. Despite defeats to both Sète and Cannes, PSG-Asnières took advantage of an open competition and qualified for the final by defeating Saint-Étienne in straight sets (3–0).

The final, held at the Halle Georges Carpentier against Cannes—European finalists and the dominant force in the championship—produced a major upset, as PSG-Asnières claimed a 3–0 victory in straight sets. Against all expectations, volleyball thus delivered the PSG sports club its first French championship title. In the Coupe de France, PSG-Asnières recorded a straight-sets victory over Riom in the round of 32, before being eliminated in the round of 16 by Sète after a five-set encounter (3–2).

=== Coupe de France winners ===
PSG-Asnières strengthened their squad with the addition of French international Christophe Meneau from Catania. Following their surprise French championship title the previous season, the club faced renewed competition, particularly from newly promoted PUC, who were considered early contenders for the league crown. The 1993–94 season began poorly, with PSG-Asnières finishing ninth out of twelve teams in a pre-season tournament, but the team rebounded with five consecutive league victories before suffering a 3–1 defeat at Grenoble. In the CEV Champions League, marking the club's European debut, PSG-Asnières progressed past Danish side Holte in the opening round, before losing to Las Palmas in the round of 16. They were subsequently reinstated after the Spaniards were found to have fielded an ineligible player, but were ultimately eliminated in the quarter-finals by Italian club Parma, the previous season's finalist.

Domestically, PSG-Asnières finished second in the regular league season behind Cannes, splitting their head-to-head matches with a 3–2 home defeat and a 3–0 away victory. In the Coupe de France, the team claimed the title by defeating local rivals PUC 3–2 in a tightly contested final at the Halle Carpentier, aided by a decisive error from PUC. In the league championship playoffs, PSG-Asnières defeated Poitiers in the quarter-finals and PUC in the semi-finals to set up a rematch of the previous season's final against Cannes. However, this time the Cannois, led by Laurent Chambertin and Jacques Yoko, won both matches of the two-legged final (3–1 and 3–2), ending PSG's hopes of a domestic double.

PSG Asnières significantly rejuvenated its squad with the departures of Olivier Henno, Gino Brousseau (to Japan), and Olivier Rossard (to Cannes), three of the club's key players. The Parisian side recruited Frantz Granvorka and Johan Cohen—sons of former French internationals Séverin Granvorka and Bernard Cohen respectively—both highly regarded prospects in French volleyball and junior internationals, along with Bakhytzhan Baitureyev from PUC. Preparations for the 1994–95 season proved successful, highlighted by a prestigious victory at the Open Begay invitational tournament against Italy's Milan, Brazil's Suzano, and Russia's Nizhnevartovsk.

After a promising start marked by three league victories, PSG-Asnières entered an inconsistent period following a defeat to PUC at the Salle Pierre Charpy, which was followed by further losses to Poitiers, Sète, and Avignon. Led by captain Christophe Meneau, the team finished eighth in the regular season and narrowly qualified for the playoffs. There, PSG-Asnières were eliminated before the final for the first time since the club's founding, finishing last in the group stage and ultimately placing eighth after losing the seventh-place match against Montpellier.

In European competition, PSG-Asnières defeated Israeli side Hapoel Bat Yam in both legs of the round of 16, but was eliminated in the quarter-finals of the CEV Cup—just short of the Final Four—by Spanish club Soria on points scored, after each team won one match (0–3, 3–0). In domestic cup competition, the Parisians eliminated PUC in the semi-finals of the Coupe de France; however, the season concluded with a 3–0 defeat to Cannes in the final on 18 March 1995, which marked the last match played under the name PSG-Asnières. At youth level, the club won the French Espoirs championship, with PSG-Asnières player Nenad Đorđević serving as manager of the reserve team.

=== From Asnières to Racing ===
Ahead of the 1995–96 season, Paris Saint-Germain withdrew from its partnership with Asnières while retaining the club's top-flight licence, and merged with Racing Club de France to form PSG-Racing, following a model previously adopted by the club's basketball section. As a result, the Asnières team was forced to restart independently in the third division under the name Asnières Volley 92, retaining the Courtilles home ground, while PSG-Racing moved to the Salle Pierre Charpy. The PSG-Racing reorganization, combined with a reduced budget—from 6 million to 4 million francs—led to a significant overhaul of the squad. André Patin remained with Asnières and was replaced as manager by Pierre Bezault, formerly of PUC. Dimitri Tsvetkov and Xavier Richefort assumed senior roles within the team, while three young players from Racing—Leonid Gorbatiuk, Valerio Guagnelli, and Antoine Théry—were integrated into the first-team squad.

Following an eleventh-place finish in the pre-season tournament, PSG-Racing struggled in the early stages of the league. The team endured a six-match losing streak and was eliminated in the round of 16 of the Coupe de France by Tourcoing. The club's first victory, a 3–2 win at Tours, marked a turning point after a poor start that left Paris at the bottom of the league table. The arrival of Dutch international Ronald Zoodsma, a regular for the Netherlands national team, had little effect, as Cohen and Granvorka were largely unavailable due to academic commitments. In European competition, PSG-Racing's campaign in the CEV Cup was disappointing, suffering defeats against Swiss side Näfels, Israeli team Hapoël Mate-Asher, and Dutch club Alcom Capelle, all of which were considered winnable matches. The club finished bottom of its group, recording two wins and five defeats.

The second half of the season proved more consistent with the club's ambitions, highlighted by victories over Nice, Tourcoing, and Avignon, as PSG-Racing narrowly secured the final playoff spot, finishing eighth after a tight battle with Rennes. Hampered by an accumulation of injuries and the departure of Ronald Zoodsma—who withdrew shortly before the playoffs due to an infectious illness—manager Pierre Bezault was forced to return to the court. The decisive match of the season came against Avignon, with a victory required to secure European qualification. PSG-Racing, however, lost 2–3, finished last in the group stage, and saw PUC crowned French champions, confirming their status as the leading force in Parisian volleyball.

Despite a turbulent off-season, during which the club's future was called into question, PSG-Racing began the 1996–97 season with a completely overhauled squad. The team saw nine departures, including Granvorka to PUC and Cohen taking a sabbatical year for his studies, leaving only one survivor in the starting six: the veteran Dimitri Tsvetkov. At 37, with over 300 appearances for the French national team, Eric N'Gapeth joined from Monaco to lead a squad featuring Franco-Cameroonian star Jacques Yoko and Spanish international Héctor López.

Following a disastrous pre-season tournament in which PSG-Racing finished 14th out of 14, Éric N'Gapeth oversaw the return of Xavier Richefort, who had briefly retired to pursue an acting career, after two defeats at the start of the championship. The team recovered in the second half of the season, recording notable victories over Cannes (3–0) and PUC (3–1), the two league leaders, which triggered a run of eight consecutive wins. PSG-Racing ultimately finished sixth in the league, securing playoff qualification, but managed only one victory in the final tournament and placed last in the group stage. The season concluded with a 0–3 home defeat to Nice in the quarter-finals of the Coupe de France, while PUC once again claimed the league title.

=== Merger with PUC ===
Ambition returned for PSG-Racing as the club aimed for a podium finish and European qualification. Franck Granvorka rejoined the team after a season at PUC, accompanied by his former teammate Nicolas Capet, while Johan Cohen returned following his sabbatical year. Canadian players, including setter Kent Greves, as well as Keith Sanheim and Kevin Chiswell, also joined the squad. Despite these reinforcements, the 1997–98 season began poorly, with two defeats in the first three rounds against Poitiers and Tourcoing. A 3–2 victory over rivals PUC, followed by a 13-match winning streak, enabled PSG-Racing to finish the year tied at the top of the league with PUC and Cannes.

The start of 1998 was highlighted by a 3–2 derby victory over PUC, followed by a 0–3 defeat at Cannes, which ended PSG-Racing's 15-match winning streak. The club finished the regular season as co-leaders of the league alongside Cannes and reached the Coupe de France quarter-finals, where they were defeated 3–2 by eventual runners-up Tourcoing. During the playoff tournament, PUC narrowly finished ahead of PSG-Racing and went on to claim their third consecutive league title. Under the management of Éric N'Gapeth, who would later leave the club for Poitiers, PSG-Racing concluded the season with a victory over Poitiers, securing third place in the championship.

Behind the scenes, the club's future was being decided. On 18 May 1998, officials from PUC and PSG met to discuss the creation of a major club in Paris. The proposed merger appeared to be in jeopardy on 25 June, when PSG reportedly withdrew its support, requiring PUC to settle a one-million-franc debt before the merger could proceed. A decisive breakthrough occurred on 30 July 1998, when a protocol agreement was signed by Charles Biétry, president of the PSG sports club, and Michel Rougeyron, president of PUC, formalizing the creation of a new club, Paris Volley, intended to represent the city at the highest level. Paris Volley subsequently went on to become one of the most successful clubs in French volleyball history.

== Club names ==
Name	Period	Source
PSG-Asnières Volley	1992–1995	
PSG-Racing Volley	1995–1998	

== Grounds ==
Between 1992 and 1995, when the club competed as PSG-Asnières, the team's regular home ground was the Gymnase des Courtilles. The venue, with a capacity of 700 spectators, is part of the Centre sportif des Courtilles, a multi-sport complex located in the Paris suburb of Asnières-sur-Seine, Hauts-de-Seine, France. During the 1994–95 season, PSG-Asnières played three home matches at the Stade Pierre de Coubertin.

In 1995, following Paris Saint-Germain's separation from Asnières and merger with Racing Club de France, the newly formed PSG-Racing left Courtilles and moved to the Salle Pierre Charpy, located beneath the Stade Sébastien Charléty in Paris, with a capacity of 1,400 spectators. The club shared the venue with local rivals Paris Université Club (PUC) until 1998. PSG-Racing also occasionally hosted matches at the Coubertin, playing three home fixtures there between 1995 and 1998.

== Honours ==
As of 1997–98 season.

Type	Competitions	Titles	Seasons
National	LNV Ligue A Masculine	1	1992–93
National	Coupe de France	1	1993–94
Academy	Championnat National Espoirs	1	1994–95
Friendly	Open Begay	1	1994

== Statistics ==
=== Seasons ===
As of 1997–98 season.

Winners Runners-up Promoted Relegated

Season	LNV Ligue A Masculine		Coupe de France	CEV Champions League	CEV Cup
Season	Regular	Playoffs	Coupe de France	CEV Champions League	CEV Cup
1992–93	5th	Winners	Round of 16	—N/a	—N/a
1993–94	2nd	Runners-up	Winners	Quarter-finals	—N/a
1994–95	4th	8th	Runners-up	—N/a	Quarter-finals
1995–96	8th	Group stage	Round of 16	—N/a	Group stage
1996–97	6th	Group stage	Quarter-finals	—N/a	—N/a
1997–98	2nd	3rd	Quarter-finals	—N/a	—N/a

=== Competitive record ===
As of 1997–98 season.

Competition	MP	W	D	L	WP%
League
LNV Ligue A Masculine	184	117	0	67	63.59
National cups
Coupe de France	15	10	0	5	66.67
International cups
CEV Champions League	7	5	0	2	71.43
CEV Cup	11	5	0	6	45.45
Total	217	137	0	80	63.13

== Personnel ==
=== Club officials ===
Position	Name	Paris Saint-Germain	Source
President	(France) Charles Biétry	1992–1998	
First-team manager	(France) André Patin	1992–1995	
Reserve team manager	(Socialist Federal Republic of Yugoslavia) Nenad Đorđević	1994–1995	
First-team manager	(France) Pierre Bezault	1995–1996	
First-team manager	(France) Eric N'Gapeth	1996–1998	

=== Notable players ===
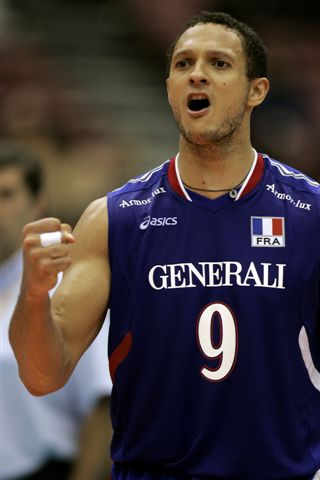
Frantz Granvorka

Player	Position	Paris Saint-Germain	Source
(Canada) Gino Brousseau	Outside hitter	1992–1994	
(France) Olivier Rossard	Outside hitter	1992–1994	
(France) Olivier Henno	Universal	1992–1994	
(Socialist Federal Republic of Yugoslavia) Nenad Đorđević	Universal	1992–1995	
(France) Xavier Richefort	Setter	1992–1997	
(Russia) Dimitri Tsvetkov	Opposite	1992–1997	
(France) Christophe Meneau	Middle-blocker	1993–1995	
(France) Frantz Granvorka	Outside hitter	1994–1996, 1997–1998	
(France) Johan Cohen	Libero	1994–1996, 1997–1998	
(Spain) Héctor López	Middle-blocker	1996–1997	
(France) Jacques Yoko	Outside hitter	1996–1998	
(Canada) Kent Greves	Setter	1997–1998	

=== Captains ===
No.	Player	Captaincy	Source
1	(France) Christophe Meneau	1994–1995	
