= PSG (disambiguation) =

Paris Saint-Germain FC (PSG) is a French football club.

PSG may also refer to:

== Businesses, groups, and organizations ==
- PSG Financial Services, a South African asset management firm
- Pacific Seabird Group, an ornithological society
- Paramount Stations Group, former US TV owner
- Pfadfinderinnenschaft Sankt Georg, a German Girl Scout association
- Presidential Security Group, close protection agency of the Philippines government
- Problem-Solving Group, in IT

=== Education ===
- PSG College of Arts and Science, Coimbatore, Tamil Nadu, India
- PSG College of Technology, Coimbatore, Tamil Nadu, India
- Philippine School in Greece

=== Politics ===
- Socialist Equality Party (Germany) (former Partei für Soziale Gleichheit)
- Guianese Socialist Party (French Parti socialiste guyanais)
- Peru Support Group, a UK-based advocacy organisation
- Progressive Senate Group, Canada
- Movement of Free Citizens (Pokret slobodnih građana), a political party in Serbia

=== Sports groups ===
- Paris Saint-Germain FC (women), women's football club
- Paris Saint-Germain FC Youth Academy
- Paris Saint-Germain Handball
- Paris Saint-Germain Judo
- Paris Saint-Germain Basketball, a former basketball club
- Paris Saint-Germain Boxing, a former boxing club
- Paris Saint-Germain Rugby League, a former rugby league club
- Paris Saint-Germain Volleyball, a former volleyball club
- PSG Esports
- PSG.LGD, a former Dota 2 club
- Pasargad F.C., a Filipino football club

== Science, engineering, and technology ==
- Phosphosilicate glass
- Polysomnography, sleep study
- Programmable sound generator, a sound chip

=== Firearms ===
- Heckler & Koch PSG1, sniper rifle
- Psg-90 (Prickskyttegevär 90), the Swedish version of the Accuracy International Arctic Warfare rifle

== Other uses ==
- Particular social group, UN refugee category
- Platoon sergeant, senior enlisted member of a platoon
- Pesing railway station (station code PSG), Jakarta, Indonesia
- Petersburg James A. Johnson Airport (IATA airport code PSG), Alaska, USA
- Penang Sign Language (ISO 639 language code psg)
- Phonetic Symbol Guide, reference book on phonetic transcriptions
- Pagan Spirit Gathering, a US festival
