= Paris Saint-Germain (disambiguation) =

Paris Saint-Germain FC is a French association football club based in Paris.

Paris Saint-Germain may also refer to:

- Paris Saint-Germain FC (women), a French women's association football club and the female section of Paris Saint-Germain FC
- Paris Saint-Germain FC Youth Academy, the youth system of Paris Saint-Germain FC
- Paris Saint-Germain Handball, a French handball club and the handball section of Paris Saint-Germain FC
- PSG Esports, a French esports club and the eSports section of Paris Saint-Germain FC
- Paris Saint-Germain Judo, a French judo club and the judo section of Paris Saint-Germain FC
- Paris Saint-Germain Basketball, a defunct French basketball club and formerly the basketball section of Paris Saint-Germain FC
- Paris Saint-Germain Volleyball, a defunct French volleyball club and formerly the volleyball section of Paris Saint-Germain FC
- Paris Saint-Germain Boxing, a defunct French boxing club and formerly the boxing section of Paris Saint-Germain FC
- Paris Saint-Germain Rugby League, a defunct French rugby league club and formerly the rugby league section of Paris Saint-Germain FC
