= Rossard =

Rossard is a surname. Notable people with the surname include:

- Nicolas Rossard (born 1990), French volleyball player, cousin of Thibault
- Olivier Rossard (born 1965), French volleyball player
- Thibault Rossard (born 1993), French volleyball player
