= PSG1 =

PSG1 may refer to:

- PSG1 (gene) (pregnancy specific glycoprotein 1)
- Heckler & Koch PSG1, a rifle

== See also ==
- PSGI
- PSGL
- PSG (disambiguation)
