= Meneau =

Meneau is a surname. Notable people with the surname include:

- Christophe Meneau (born 1968), French volleyball player
- Marc Meneau (1943–2020), French chef
