= Bocquaine Pool and Ice Rink =

Sports complex in Reims, Marne, France

Coordinates: 49.2458°N 4.0266°E

Piscine-patinoire de Reims
- Interactive map of Piscine-patinoire de Reims
- Address: 41 Chaussée Bocquaine

Construction
- Built: 1964-1967
- Opened: 16 October 1967 (aquatic center); 23 October 1967 (ice rink)
- Renovated: 1998
- Closed: 25 October 2013
- Demolished: 2014
- Cost: ₣10,000,000
- Architects: Jean-Claude Dondel; Roger Dhuit; Jacques Herbé

Piscine-patinoire olympique de Reims (English: Reims Olympic Pool and Ice Rink), also known as Piscine-patinoire Bocquaine after the street it was built on, and Nautilud for the swimming pool part, was a sports complex located in Reims, Marne, France.

== Building ==
The three-level building consisted of a swimming pool and an ice rink, overlooked by a panoramic restaurant with a view of the ice and the pool on each side (the latter was phased out in the 1990s).

=== Ice rink ===
Bocquaine Ice Rink served as the home of Reims' ice hockey teams, the Flammes Bleues and later the Phénix. Some promoters, including Gérard Drouot who hailed from Reims, have also used it as a live music venue.

=== Aquatic center ===
The aquatic center housed the city's only 50-metre pool, as well as a smaller teaching pool. In the 1980s, a toboggan—86-metre long as of its dismantlement—was added to the building. It was the home pool for Reims Natation 89, a water polo team that sporadically featured in the Pro A league.

== History ==
The building was approved by the City Council of Reims in 1963. It was designed by the Paris-based team of Jean-Claude Dondel and Roger Dhuit, in cooperation with Jacques Herbé, member of a prominent family of local architects.

The complex had two inauguration ceremonies : one for local dignitaries in October 1967, attended by swimmer Alain Gottvallès, and one in early December 1967, in presence of Minister of Sports François Missoffe.

In 1998, Bocquaine underwent extensive renovations, which included the installation of an elevator.

In 2013, the venue had to close immediately after an inspection found advanced signs of decay on its wooden framework. As another renovation was neither technically nor economically viable, it was torn down in the fall of 2014. In this absence of an adequate pool, Reims Natation 89 opted for voluntary relegation to the second tier of French water polo at the end of the 2013–14 season.

== Events ==
=== Sports ===
The rink hosted the French Figure Skating championships in 1975, 1980 and 1991, as well as the French Ice Dancing Championships in 1972 when they were still a standalone event. It also hosted the French Short Track Speed Skating Championships in 2003, 2006 and 2009.

=== Concerts ===
Acts that featured at the ice rink include Ange, Magma, Genesis and Barclay James Harvest.
