= Chris Singleton =

Chris Singleton may refer to:

- Chris Singleton (musician) (born 1977), Irish singer/songwriter
- Chris Singleton (American football) (born 1967), played in the NFL
- Chris Singleton (baseball) (born 1972), center fielder in Major League Baseball
- Chris Singleton (basketball, born 1989), professional basketball player
- Chris Singleton (basketball, born 1957), professional basketball player, coach and commentator
