= Jacques Herbé =

French architect and urban planner

- Born: 15 July 1898; Reims, France
- Died: 7 March 1993 (aged 94); Epernay, France
- Occupation: Architect

Félix Paul Jacques Herbé (15 July 1898 – 7 March 1993) was a French architect and urban planner.

Born in Reims, he was the older brother of Paul Herbé. The two siblings partnered with Robert Camelot to form a study that operated between 1933 and 1941. They made significant contributions to the city of Beaune, with varying degrees of success. The School for Young Girls they designed still stands and has been registered as a heritage site, while their 1938 outdoor auditorium was demolished in 1954 by the mayor who had commissioned it, in large part due to poor acoustics.

Jacques Herbé occasionally contributed to his brother's burgeoning international career, and co-designed the Pavillon de la manufacture de Sèvre for the 1937 Paris World's Fair.

The partnership was broken up by the outbreak of World War II, after which Paul Herbé moved on to tackle international projects at Bernard Zehrfuss' Paris agency. Jacques Herbé remained based in Reims. Among his most visible works were two of the area's sporting venues: a new building at the historic Tennis Club de Reims, which replaced the original built by Édouard Redont and destroyed during the war, and the Bocquaine Pool and Ice Rink, co-designed with Jean-Claude Dondel and Roger Dhuit.
