= N'Gapeth =

N'Gapeth is a French surname. Notable people with the surname include:

- Earvin N'Gapeth (born 1991), French volleyball player
- Eric N'Gapeth (born 1959), French volleyball player and coach
