= Séverin Granvorka =

French volleyball player and coach (1947–2025)

Personal information
- Born: 23 October 1947; Le Lorrain, Martinique, France
- Died: 16 September 2025 (aged 77)

Coaching information
Previous teams coached
Years	Teams
1980–1983; 1986–2003; 2003–2006; 2006–2010	France; Genève-Elite Volleyball; VBC Martigny; Switzerland

Volleyball information
- Position: Receiver-attacker (Outside hitter)

Career
Years	Teams
1970–1980	VGA Saint-Maur

National team
1969–1979	France
Honours
Men's volleyball
Representing France
France Championships
Gold medal – first place	1976 France	Team

Séverin Granvorka (23 October 1947 – 16 September 2025) was a French volleyball player and coach.

== Early life and career ==
Granvorka was born in Le Lorrain, Martinique. He attended Schoelcher High School.

Granvorka played for the France men's national team from 1969 to 1979. During his national team career, he competed at the 1976 France Men's Volleyball Championships, winning the gold medal in the team event. He retired his volleyball career in 1980. After retiring, he served as head coach of the France women's national team from 1980 to 1983, and as head coach of the Switzerland women's national team from 2006 to 2010.

== Personal life and death ==
Granvorka was married to Mireille Cuendet, a volleyball player. They had three children together, Frantz Granvorka, a FIVB Men's Volleyball World Championships medalist and 2004 Summer Olympics competitor, Inès Granvorka, a FIVB Volleyball Women's Club World Championships competitor, and Yoan Granvorka, a professional basketball player.

Granvorka died on 16 September 2025, at the age of 77.
