= Paris Saint-Germain Basketball =

French professional basketball club

Paris Saint-Germain
- Nickname: Metropolitans
- League: LNB Élite
- Founded: 1992
- Dissolved: 2000
- History: PSG-Racing Basket (1992–2000)
- Arena: Stade Pierre de Coubertin
- Capacity: 4,016
- Team colors
- President: Charles Biétry
- Head coach: Didier Dobbels
- Team captain: Laurent Sciarra
- Championships: 1 LNB Élite

Paris Saint-Germain Basketball, commonly known as PSG-Racing Basket, was a French professional basketball club based in Paris, France. It operated as the basketball department of Paris Saint-Germain FC. Founded in 1992, following the takeover of Racing Paris Basket by PSG and its owners Canal+, the club competed in the LNB Élite, the top tier of French basketball. Throughout its existence, PSG-Racing primarily played its home games at the Stade Pierre de Coubertin, with occasional matches held at the Palais des sports Marcel-Cerdan.

Despite an ambitious recruitment drive, PSG-Racing experienced early difficulties, notably a surprise defeat in the Coupe de la Ligue final, but gradually established itself as a competitive force in French basketball during the mid-1990s. Relying on a mix of young French talents and American imports, the club regularly finished in the upper half of the league standings. Its most consistent league performance came in the 1995–96 season, when PSG-Racing finished fifth in the regular season, the best league finish in the club's history.

The club reached its peak during the 1996–97 season, when it won the French championship, securing the only LNB Élite title in its history. That campaign featured a club-record number of official matches and marked the high point of PSG-Racing's sporting success. In parallel, the team remained a regular participant in domestic cup competitions, reaching the semi-finals and quarter-finals of the Coupe de France and the Leaders Cup. PSG-Racing also competed internationally, taking part in the EuroLeague, FIBA Saporta Cup, FIBA Korać Cup, and the McDonald's Championship, achieving mixed results but recording several notable performances, including a club-best semi-final appearance in the Saporta Cup in 1997.

By the late 1990s, financial uncertainty, particularly following Canal+'s decision to reduce its involvement, combined with injuries and squad instability to undermine the club's competitiveness. Despite highlights such as winning the Alfortville Tournament in 1999 and finishing runners-up in the Coupe de France in 2000, PSG-Racing was dissolved in May 2000. Its place in French basketball was subsequently taken by Paris Basket Racing, bringing an end to an eight-year chapter of PSG's involvement in professional basketball.

== History ==
=== PSG takeover and European debut ===
In early June 1992, following the dissolution of Racing Paris Basket, which had been administratively relegated to the second division, Paris Saint-Germain FC, its owners Canal+, and the Council of Paris collaborated to preserve top-level basketball in the capital. The club was renamed PSG-Racing Basket and assumed the LNB Élite licence, marking the first step toward the creation of a Paris Saint-Germain multisport organisation under Charles Biétry, which later included sections in handball, judo, volleyball, rugby league, and boxing. The club launched an ambitious recruitment drive, signing former Maccabi Tel Aviv star Kevin Magee, NBA champion Milt Wagner, and experienced French veterans Hervé Dubuisson and Freddy Hufnagel.

The 1992–93 season opened with a home defeat to Le Mans, followed by a seven-match winning streak in the league before a loss to leaders Limoges. Thereafter, results declined despite the arrivals of Delaney Rudd and later Kenny Travis, who replaced the injured Wagner. Paris finished the regular season in sixth place and was eliminated in the playoffs by Élan Béarnais, led by Romanian center Gheorghe Mureșan. PSG-Racing subsequently secured qualification for the FIBA Korać Cup by defeating local rivals Levallois in a playoff round. The season concluded with a defeat in the Coupe de la Ligue final against Dijon, who had finished 12th in the regular season. Manager Jean-Pierre Rebatet was dismissed at the end of the campaign and replaced by Chris Singleton, who had guided Dijon to the cup title.

PSG-Racing began the 1993–94 season with a rejuvenated roster, featuring two of France's top basketball prospects, Yann Bonato and Laurent Sciarra, alongside American players Bill Jones and Paul Fortier, who were already active in France. Sciarra had signed with PSG without the consent of his previous club, Hyères-Toulon, leaving Paris temporarily without their point guard while the matter was resolved in the labor courts. The team opened the season with a quarter-final defeat to Élan Béarnais in the Leaders Cup and a home loss to Montpellier but gradually improved, highlighted by a 71–61 away victory over European champions Limoges. A subsequent five-game winning streak propelled PSG-Racing to co-leader of the league, although losses to Antibes, Cholet, and Dijon prevented the club from consolidating its position.

In its European debut, PSG-Racing was quickly eliminated from the Korać Cup by Greek side Peristeri and faced challenges with a limited roster due to multiple injuries. Despite these setbacks, the club retained Laurent Sciarra for the 1994–95 season. Paris finished the regular season in sixth place, matching their standing from the previous year. In the playoffs, they defeated third-placed Cholet in the quarter-finals but were eliminated by Antibes in the semi-finals, narrowly missing out on the final. In domestic cup competition, PSG-Racing fell to Limoges in the semi-finals of the Coupe de France, yet the team demonstrated that Chris Singleton's assembled squad had the potential to be a strong contender in French basketball.

=== Best league finish ===
With an average age of 23 among its French players, including young prospects Franck Mériguet and Stéphane Risacher, and the long-awaited return of Laurent Sciarra after a year on the sidelines, PSG-Racing was regarded as an outsider at the start of the 1994–95 season. Paris struggled at the beginning of the league campaign, suffering three consecutive defeats, and were eliminated early from the Korać Cup by Turkish side Ülker. The team recovered domestically, finishing the regular season in sixth place for the third consecutive year.

PSG-Racing's Coupe de France campaign ended in the semi-finals with a narrow three-point defeat to Limoges (66–69). In the league playoffs, the club was eliminated in the quarter-finals by Élan Béarnais, again by a margin of three points. Yann Bonato was named French Player of the Season at the LNB Élite Awards before announcing his departure for Limoges. Despite losing their standout player, PSG-Racing retained manager Chris Singleton, who extended his contract for an additional two seasons.

Bonato's departure was mitigated by the signings of Georgy Adams from Limoges, former NBA player Stephen Howard, and the previous season's leading rebounder Ian Lockhart from Dijon. The start of the campaign proved difficult, with PSG-Racing eliminated from the Korać Cup by English side London Towers, followed by two league defeats. After the high-profile visit of Magic Johnson's Pepsi Magic Team, who defeated PSG-Racing 119–89 in a friendly at the Stade Pierre de Coubertin (119–89), Paris recovered and climbed back to sixth place by mid-season.

Disappointed with the performances of Ian Lockhart, PSG-Racing signed American Ronnie Thompkins, and former NBA players Chad Gallagher and Marcus Webb, though none made a significant impact. Georgy Adams was temporarily suspended following a violent altercation with manager Chris Singleton and subsequently lost his place in the starting lineup. Despite these disruptions, PSG-Racing finished the 1995–96 season in fifth place, the best league finish in the club's history. The team was eliminated in the quarter-finals of the playoffs by defending champions Antibes and suffered a quarter-final exit in the Coupe de France at the hands of ASVEL. Laurent Sciarra finished the season as the league's top assister for the second consecutive year.

=== French champions ===
PSG-Racing made a major move in the transfer market by signing French basketball legend Richard Dacoury, who had fallen out of favor at Limoges. The club also recruited two high-profile NBA veterans: guard Sedale Threatt, formerly of the Los Angeles Lakers, and J. R. Reid, previously with the New York Knicks. Sponsored by the RATP Group and nicknamed the "Metropolitans," PSG-Racing were regarded as serious title contenders. However, following an opening defeat at Cholet and an injury to Threatt—who was successively replaced by Rusty LaRue and Yugoslav player Žarko Paspalj—manager Chris Singleton was dismissed on 2 November 1996 after a mixed start to the season in both domestic league play and the FIBA Saporta Cup, compounded by conflicts with several senior players.

Co-managers Jacky Renaud and Didier Dobbels took charge of PSG-Racing following the publicly announced but ultimately aborted appointment of Italian manager Valerio Bianchini. By mid-season, despite a €6 million budget, PSG-Racing was struggling. The arrival of Slovenian guard Jure Zdovc, a 1993 European champion with Limoges, along with qualification for the Saporta Cup round of 16 after an overtime victory against Lithuanian side Žalgiris, sparked a revival. PSG-Racing then went on a seven-game winning streak and achieved a decisive victory over Turkish club Türk Telekom to reach the semi-finals of the European competition, where they were set to face Real Madrid. The return to form of Richard Dacoury, sidelined by a long-term injury, was also instrumental in the resurgence.

Paris bowed out of the Saporta Cup semi-finals with honor against Real Madrid, narrowly losing both legs (57–62, 56–58), before signing American guard Fred Herzog as the fifth foreign player to replace Threatt. Finishing fifth in the league, PSG-Racing became a serious playoff contender, eliminating Le Mans (fourth in the regular season) and defending champions Élan Béarnais (first place) in three-game series, before defeating ASVEL in the final to claim the club's first French championship. The team completed an extraordinary season with a club-record 57 official games. The only low point was an early exit from the Coupe de France, losing to Antibes in the round of 16.

=== EuroLeague heartbreak ===
Fresh from winning the French championship, PSG-Racing appointed Yugoslav manager Božidar Maljković, renowned for having led Limoges to the European title. Maljković reunited with Richard Dacoury and Frédéric Forte, who was recruited to replace Laurent Sciarra following his departure to Spain. Spanish international Alfonso Reyes, American forward Melvin Cheatum, and Yugoslav guard Nikola Lončar were signed to compensate for the departure of J. R. Reid, who left to join the NBA's Charlotte Hornets. PSG-Racing opened the 1997–98 season with a landmark victory—its first opening-day win—by defeating Chalon 60–38, but were soon weakened by Cheatum's knee injury. The club subsequently signed Yugoslav center Dejan Koturović to replace him, yet Paris struggled in their EuroLeague debut, suffering four consecutive defeats at the start of the competition.

PSG-Racing gained confidence at the 1997 McDonald's Championship held at the Accor Arena. The Parisians defeated European powerhouse Barcelona in the preliminary round, setting up a semi-final clash with Michael Jordan's Chicago Bulls. PSG-Racing delivered a competitive performance against the reigning NBA champions, narrowly losing 82–89, before finishing fourth in the tournament following another defeat to Argentine side Atenas in the third-place match. This world championship marked the start of PSG-Racing's European season, with subsequent victories against Cibona Zagreb, AEK Athens, Alba Berlin, and Fortitudo Bologna. By mid-season, Paris were second in the domestic league behind ASVEL, prompting the club to release Troy Truvillion and sign Swedish player Torbjörn Gherke along with prospect Jean-Marc Kraidy.

Despite a difficult start to 1998, PSG-Racing achieved a notable 69–68 home victory over Barcelona in the EuroLeague. To progress to the round of 16, the team required a second win against Barcelona in Catalonia but suffered a major setback when club captain Richard Dacoury tore his Achilles tendon, officially announcing his retirement on 16 February. Three days later, PSG-Racing narrowly lost 77–78 in Barcelona, ending their EuroLeague campaign. The injury to center Dejan Koturović further weakened the squad, and the team endured a humiliating defeat in the Coupe de France, losing to second-division side Épinal. The arrival of American Acie Earl, a former Boston Celtics player, failed to reverse the club's fortunes. Paris finished the regular season in fifth place but were eliminated in the quarter-finals by Limoges.

=== Overhaul amid financial constraints ===
Following a disappointing season and the appointment of Charles Biétry as president of PSG's football team, austerity measures were implemented at PSG-Racing. The club underwent a major overhaul ahead of the 1998–99 season. Manager Božidar Maljković was replaced by Didier Dobbels, his assistant from the previous season, while club legend Richard Dacoury was promoted to sporting director. Only two players—Stéphane Risacher and Thierry Zig—who had featured in the final match of the previous season against Limoges were retained, complemented by the return of Laurent Sciarra from Italian club Pallacanestro Treviso and the arrival of Cyril Julian, a rising talent in French basketball.

On the American front, A. J. English, formerly of the Chicago Bulls, and the controversial center Jerrod Mustaf, a former New York Knicks and Phoenix Suns player, joined PSG-Racing, forming a squad with high ambitions. After a strong opening win against Cholet (70–53), the team faced setbacks with Cyril Julian sidelined by an elbow injury and Mustaf struggling with form. PSG-Racing recorded notable victories over undefeated league leaders Élan Béarnais (73–66) and runners-up Limoges (76–74) before narrowly losing to Barcelona in the Korać Cup after overtime (95–96). Eliminated from European competition by Belgian side Okapi Aalst, the club released Mustaf, replacing him first with Darnell Robinson and subsequently Aundre Branch. The return of A. J. English was also curtailed by a knee injury, prematurely ending his season.

PSG-Racing's difficulties continued as Robinson returned to the United States, leaving the club temporarily without any American players. Brad Sellers, who had previously represented Paris in 1994–95, and former NBA player Everette Stephens were signed to see out the season. Paris finished the regular season in fifth place, with Laurent Sciarra leading the league in assists, while also posting the best defensive record in the championship, conceding an average of 65.2 points per game. After defeating Chalon in the quarter-finals, PSG-Racing narrowly missed out on a place in the Coupe de France final, being eliminated at home in the semi-finals by Cholet (78–81) after surrendering a 14-point lead. The Parisians then bowed out in the league semi-finals against Élan Béarnais, having put up strong resistance, bringing a frustrating end to the season.

=== Final season and dissolution ===
PSG-Racing suffered a major setback when captain Stéphane Risacher left the club after five seasons to join Élan Béarnais. Simultaneously, highly rated 17-year-old prospect Tony Parker, who would later become one of France's greatest basketball players, departed amateur third division side CFBB to sign for the Parisian club on 1 June 1999. Parker was designated as a backup to Laurent Sciarra. During the pre-season, he helped Paris win the prestigious Alfortville Tournament, recording victories over Zlatorog Laško in the semi-finals (77–68) and Élan Béarnais in the final after overtime (73–70). PSG-Racing also signed two American players already established in France: Darius Hall of Besançon, who suffered a hand injury early in the season and was temporarily replaced by Phil Cartwright, and Brian Howard of Antibes. Greater caution was exercised following the club's extensive use of six American players in 1998–99.

On 14 September 1999, Tony Parker made his professional debut for PSG-Racing in a 73–71 victory over Cholet at Coubertin, in front of 1,500 spectators, scoring two points on three attempts and registering one assist. He produced his first notable performance with 12 points and three assists in ten minutes against Montpellier in an 84–44 win. Parker's statistics surged during a 90–49 victory over Gravelines-Dunkerque at Coubertin, where he scored 20 points, finishing as the team's top scorer and earning a place in the matchday's best team. Despite these performances and the team's challenging start to the season, manager Didier Dobbels continued to limit Parker's playing time, reportedly frustrating the young prospect. PSG-Racing subsequently recovered, going on an eight-match winning streak highlighted by a notable Saporta Cup victory over Spanish side Saski Baskonia (78–72).

In November 1999, uncertainty arose when Canal+ announced its intention to scale back its involvement with PSG-Racing. Despite the signing of former NBA guard Chris King to replace the injured Darius Hall, the club struggled, suffering three consecutive league defeats against Limoges, Strasbourg, and Chalon. PSG-Racing was also eliminated from European competition in the round of 16 of the Saporta Cup by Croatian side Zadar.

A subsequent seven-game winning streak, including home victories at Coubertin against league leaders ASVEL and Élan Béarnais, propelled PSG-Racing into the league's top four. However, a narrow 63–64 defeat at Cholet on the final matchday of the regular season dropped the club to sixth place, a result that proved decisive as PSG-Racing were eliminated in the quarter-finals by defending champions Élan Béarnais. Tony Parker played only one minute across the two matches. The 1999–2000 season concluded with a strong Coupe de France campaign, defeating Élan Béarnais and ASVEL before losing 73–79 to Limoges in the final at the Accor Arena on 30 April, in front of over 11,000 spectators, with Parker remaining on the bench.

Despite a relatively encouraging end to the season, the future of PSG-Racing appeared uncertain following the announced withdrawal of Canal+, as confirmed by club president Charles Biétry. On 5 May 2000, the dissolution of PSG-Racing was formalized, with plans for a new structure, Paris Basket Club, led by Luc Dayan and Francis Graille, who would later become involved with PSG's football department. However, the board, which held 51% of PSG-Racing's shares, opposed Biétry, and after a final twist, the club was entrusted to Louis Nicollin on 23 May 2000. PSG-Racing was replaced by Paris Basket Racing, bringing to an end an eight-year chapter in Parisian basketball.

== Club names ==
Name	Period	Source
PSG-Racing Basket	1992–2000	

== Grounds ==
The team's primary home ground was the Stade Pierre de Coubertin in Paris, France, with a capacity of 4,016 spectators. PSG-Racing Basket also occasionally hosted matches at the Palais des sports Marcel-Cerdan, which holds 4,000 spectators. Both venues were shared with local rivals Levallois, resulting in occasional relocations of home games.

== Honours ==
As of 1999–2000 season.

Type	Competitions	Titles	Seasons
National	LNB Élite	1	1996–97
Friendly	Alfortville Tournament	1	1999

== Statistics ==
=== Seasons ===
As of 1999–2000 season.

Winners Runners-up Promoted Relegated

Season	LNB Élite		Coupe de France	Coupe de la Ligue	Leaders	EuroLeague	Saporta	Korać	McDonald's
Season	Regular	Playoffs	Coupe de France	Coupe de la Ligue	Leaders	EuroLeague	Saporta	Korać	McDonald's
1992–93	6th	QF	—N/a	RU	—N/a	—N/a	—N/a	—N/a	—N/a
1993–94	6th	SF	SF	—N/a	QF	—N/a	—N/a	R3	—N/a
1994–95	6th	QF	SF	—N/a	—N/a	—N/a	—N/a	R3	—N/a
1995–96	5th	QF	QF	—N/a	—N/a	—N/a	—N/a	R1	—N/a
1996–97	5th	W	R16	—N/a	—N/a	—N/a	SF	—N/a	—N/a
1997–98	5th	QF	R16	—N/a	—N/a	R2	—N/a	—N/a	4th
1998–99	5th	SF	SF	—N/a	—N/a	—N/a	—N/a	GS	—N/a
1999–2000	6th	QF	RU	—N/a	—N/a	—N/a	R16	—N/a	—N/a

=== Competitive record ===
As of 1999–2000 season.

Competition	MP	W	D	L	WP%
League
LNB Élite	266	159	0	107	59.77
National cups
Coupe de France	24	17	0	7	70.83
Coupe de la Ligue	6	4	0	2	66.67
Leaders Cup	1	0	0	1	0.00
International cups
EuroLeague	26	12	0	14	46.15
FIBA Saporta Cup	32	24	0	8	75.00
FIBA Korać Cup	16	8	0	8	50.00
McDonald's Championship	3	1	0	2	33.33
Total	374	225	0	149	60.16

== Notable players ==
=== Awards ===
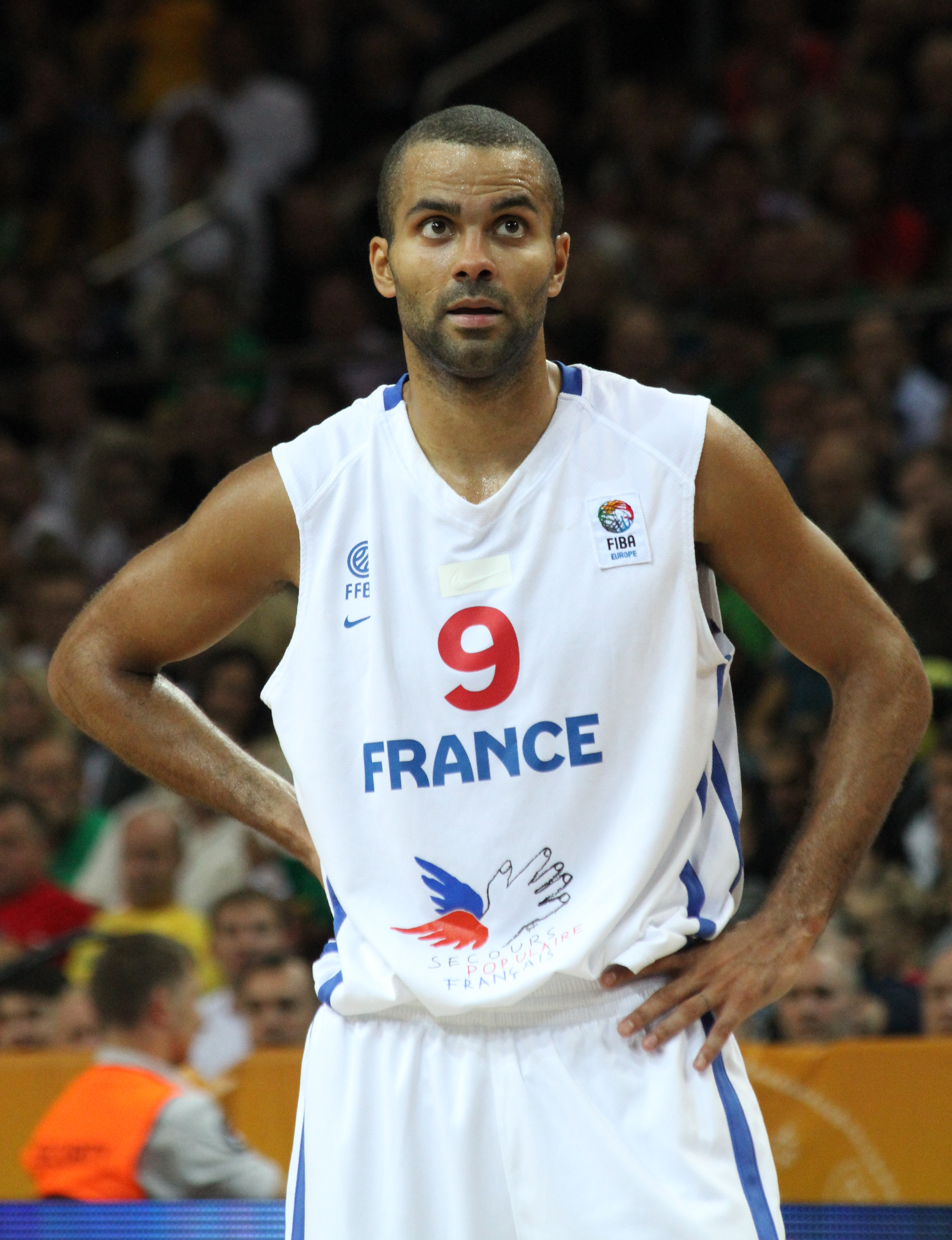
Tony Parker

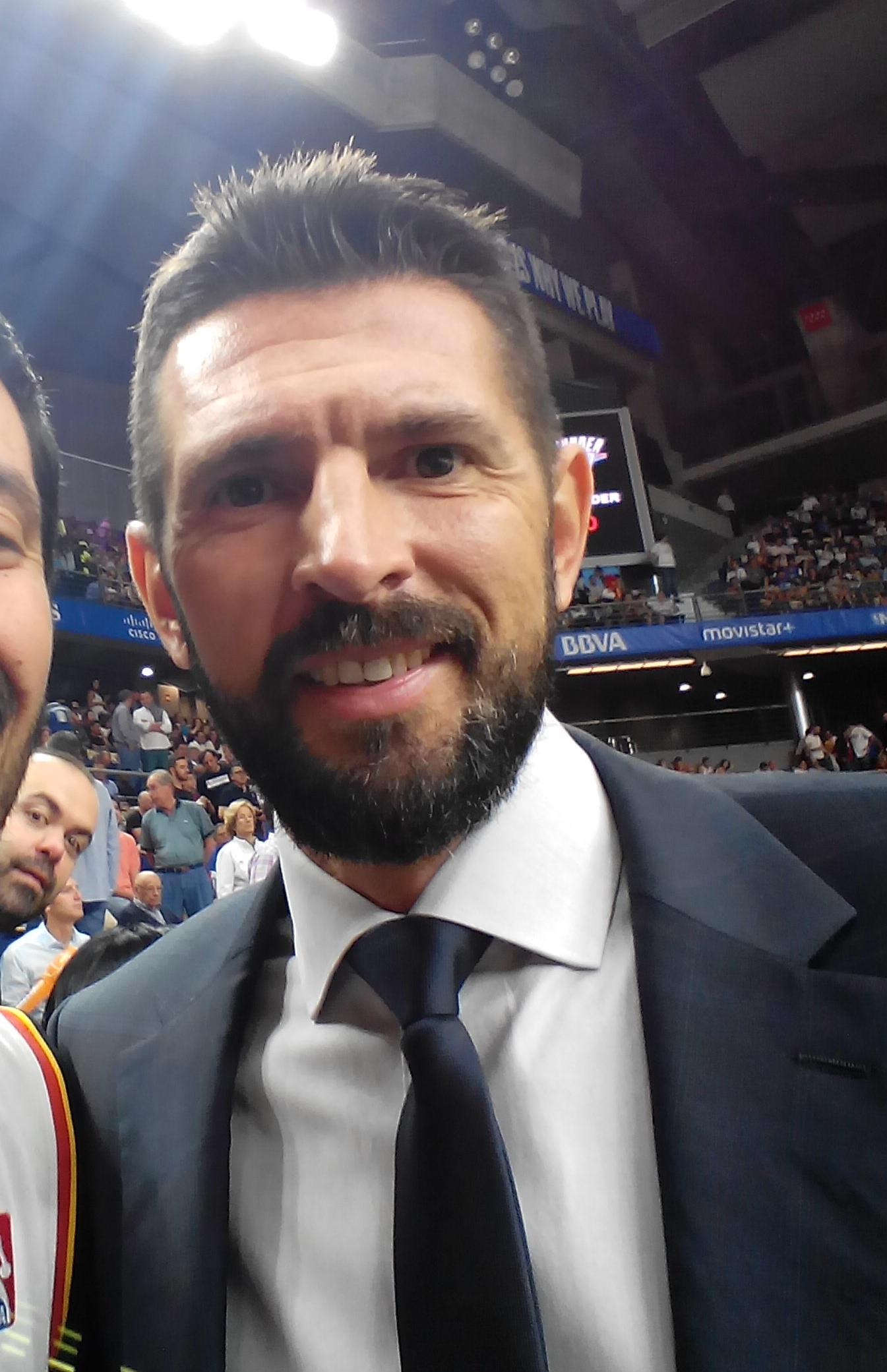
Nikola Lončar

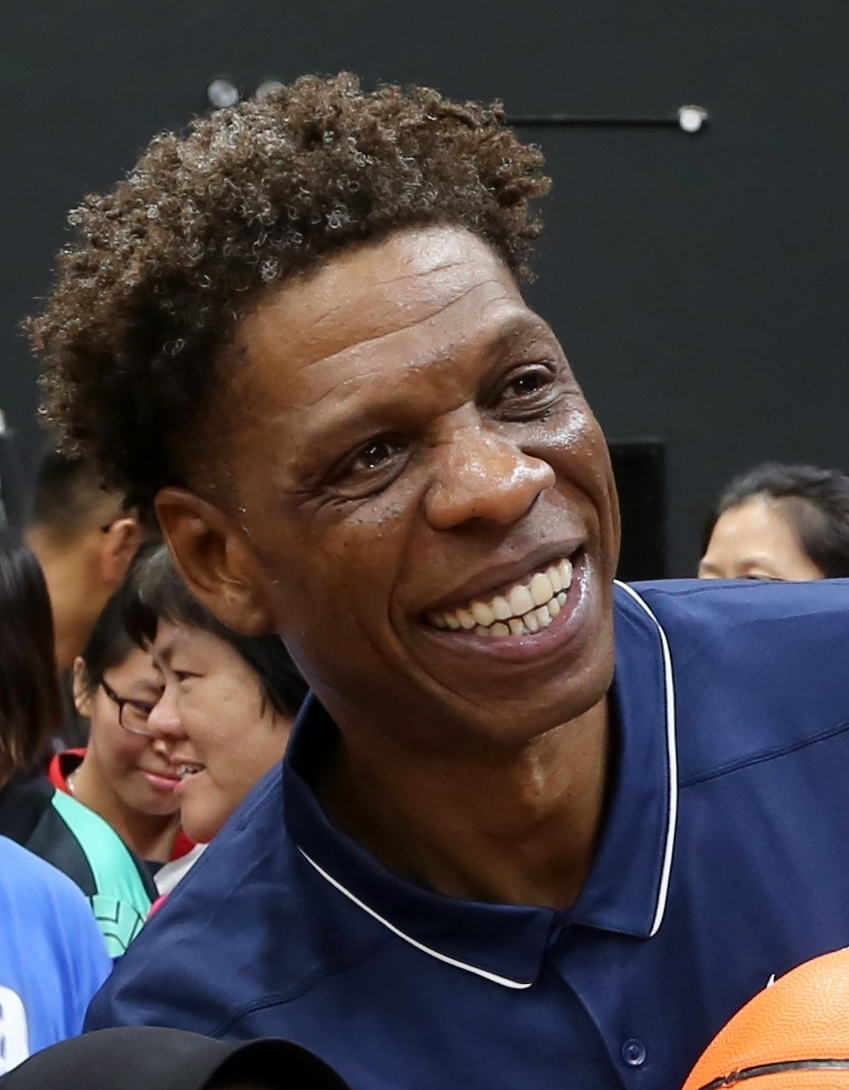
J. R. Reid

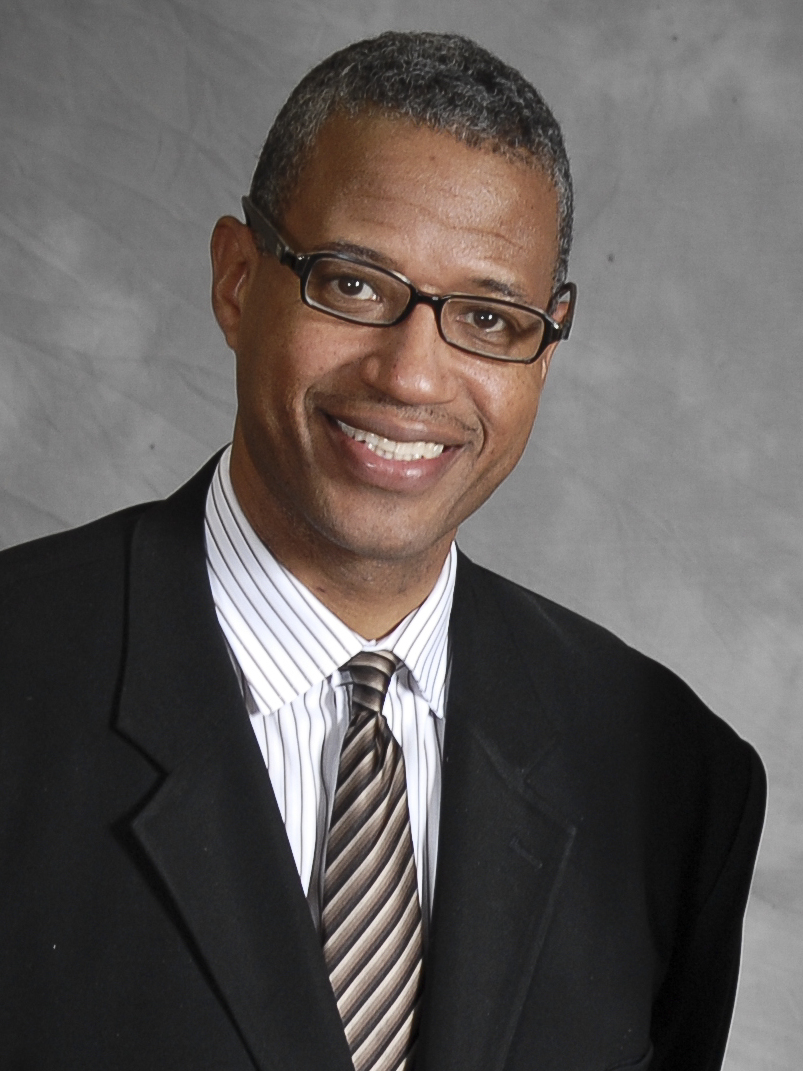
Brad Sellers

Player	Season	Award	Ceremony	Source
(France) Yann Bonato	1994–1995	LNB Élite MVP	LNB Élite Awards	
(France) Arsène Ade-Mensah	1997–1998	LNB Pro A Best Defender	LNB Élite Awards	

=== Captains ===
No.	Player	Position	Captaincy	Source
1	(France) Stéphane Lauvergne	Small forward	1992–1994	
2	(France) Laurent Sciarra	Point guard	1994–1997, 1999–2000	
3	(France) Richard Dacoury	Shooting guard	1997–1998	
4	(France) Stéphane Risacher	Small forward	1998–1999	

=== Team leaders ===
Statistics shown in gold correspond to season highs at both club and league level.

Season	Points		Rebounds		Assists		Source					
1992–1993	Points		Rebounds		Assists		(United States) Delaney Rudd	26	(United States) Kevin Magee	13.5	(United States) Delaney Rudd	8
1993–1994	(France) Yann Bonato	21.4	(United States) Paul Fortier	8.8	(France) Régis Racine	4.2						
1994–1995	(France) Yann Bonato	23.3	(United States) Brad Sellers	9.1	(France) Laurent Sciarra	9.4						
1995–1996	(United States) Stephen Howard	22.7	(United States) Stephen Howard	8.9	(France) Laurent Sciarra	9.3						
1996–1997	(United States) J. R. Reid	17.9	(United States) J. R. Reid	8.4	(France) Laurent Sciarra	7.9						
1997–1998	(Socialist Federal Republic of Yugoslavia) Nikola Lončar	15.8	(Belgium) Éric Struelens	7.7	(France) Arsène Ade-Mensah	3.3						
1998–1999	(United States) A. J. English	14	(France) Philippe Poli	7	(France) Laurent Sciarra	7.5						
1999–2000	(United States) Chris King	16.8	(United States) Chris King	6.7	(France) Laurent Sciarra	7.9						

=== Most appearances ===
Appearances in regular season league and European competitions.

Rank	Player	Position	Paris Saint-Germain	Appearances
1	(France) Stéphane Risacher	Small forward	1994–1999	188
2	(France) Laurent Sciarra	Point guard	1994–1997, 1998–2000	185
3	(France) Thierry Zig	Shooting guard	1997–2000	110
4	(France) Franck Mériguet	Shooting guard	1994–1997	96
5	(France) Jean-Marc Setier	Power forward	1993–1997	90
6	(France) Arsène Ade-Mensah	Point guard	1996–1998	87
7	(Belgium) Éric Struelens	Center	1996–1998	82
8	(France) Cyril Julian	Center	1998–2000	74
9	(Socialist Federal Republic of Yugoslavia) Neno Ašćerić	Small forward	1998–2000	72
10	(France) Rémi Rippert	Power forward	1998–2000	72

=== Honorable mentions ===
Player	Position	Paris Saint-Germain	Highlights	Source
(France) Tony Parker	Point guard	1999–2000	Basketball Hall of Fame inductee (2023); 6× NBA All-Star (2006, 2007, 2009, 2012, 2013, 2014); 4× NBA champion (2003, 2005, 2007, 2014); 4× All-NBA Team (2009, 2012, 2013, 2014); NBA All-Rookie Team (2002); NBA Finals MVP (2007)	
(United States) Milt Wagner	Shooting guard	1992–1993	NBA champion (1988)	

== Personnel ==
=== Management ===
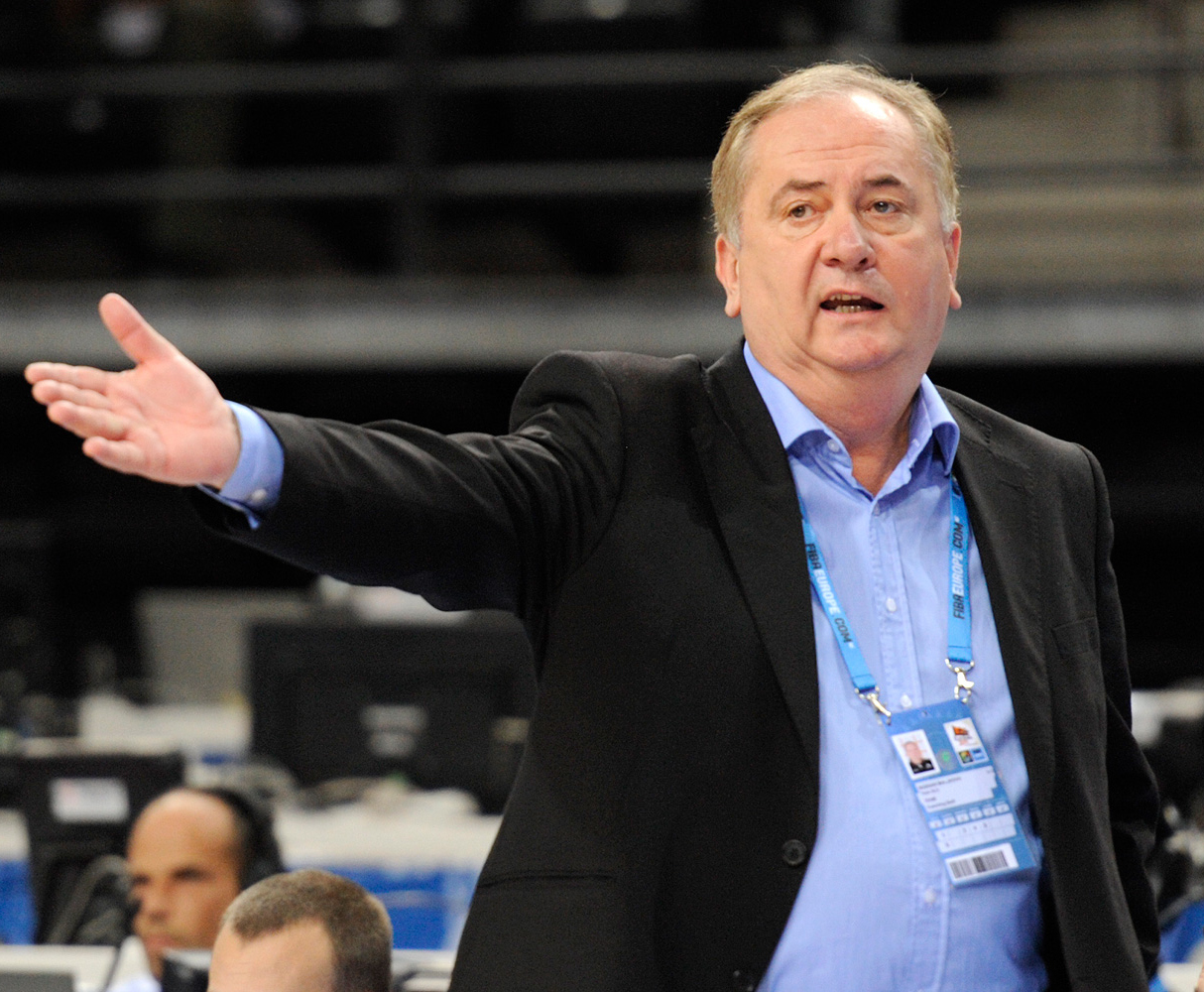
Božidar Maljković

Position	Name	Paris Saint-Germain	Source
President	(France) Charles Biétry	1992–2000	
Sporting director	(France) Éric Beugnot	1992–1995	
Sporting director	(France) Richard Dacoury	1998–2000	

=== Technical staff ===
Position	Name	Paris Saint-Germain	Source
Manager	(France) Jean-Pierre Rebatet	1992–1993	
Manager	(United States) Chris Singleton	1993–1996	
Co-Manager	(France) Jacky Renaud	1996–1997	
Co-Manager	(France) Didier Dobbels	1996–1997	
Manager	(Socialist Federal Republic of Yugoslavia) Božidar Maljković	1997–1998	
Assistant manager	(France) Didier Dobbels	1997–1998	
Manager	(France) Didier Dobbels	1998–2000	
