= Centre sportif de la Ganterie =

Public sports complex in Poitiers, France

Piscine de la Ganterie
- Interactive map of Piscine de la Ganterie
- Coordinates: 46.56996°N 0.36861°E
- Type: Indoor, outdoor
- Dimensions: Length: 50 metre (main outdoor pool) 25 metre (indoor pool 1) 15 metre (indoor pool 2); Width: 15 metre (main outdoor pool) 15 metre (indoor pool 1) 15 metre (indoor pool 2); Depth: 5.5 metre (outdoor diving pool)

Construction
- Opened: 1966

Centre sportif de la Ganterie, sometimes called Complexe sportif de la Ganterie, is a public sports complex located on the eponymous rue de la Ganterie in Poitiers, Vienne, France. It consists of an aquatic center and an indoor arena. A private ice rink, which was later acquired by the city and integrated into the swimming pool's heating system, is located close by and considered a semi-official part of the ensemble.
Most of the complex's venues host sections of multisports association Stade Poitevin, and it is located close to Stade Poitevin's headquarters at Stade Paul-Rébeilleau.

== La Ganterie Swimming Pool ==
Opened in 1966, the indoor area features a 25-metre and a 15-metre pool. The outdoor area, which opened in 1968, features a 50-metre pool and a diving pool. In 1980, the main outdoor pool was covered with a bubble for the winter months. In 2019, the bubble was removed and it became a year-round outdoor heated pool, which was partly made possible by heat recycled from the ice rink. It also houses a dojo and a gym.

Salle omnisports Frédéric-Lawson-Body
- Interactive map of Salle omnisports Frédéric-Lawson-Body
- Capacity: 2604

Construction
- Opened: 1970

Tenants
- Stade poitevin volley beach (1973–present)

== Salle omnisports Frédéric-Lawson-Body ==
Opened in 1970, this indoor hall is best known as the home venue for the Stade poitevin volley beach, and was briefly the home court for Poitiers basket 86. Originally known as Salle omnisports de la Ganterie, it was renamed in honor of French-Togolese volleyball player Frédéric Lawson-Body, following his untimely death from meningitis in 1989.

The hall represents a rare departure from architects Jean-Claude Dondel and Roger Dhuit's usual functionalist style, and its arched roof has earned it comparisons to the Eero Saarinen-designed Ingalls Rink at Yale University. A restaurant connecting the hall to the swimming pool was considered during the design phase, but it was abandoned and the buildings have remained separate.

== Poitiers Municipal Ice Rink ==
Patinoire municipale de Poitiers
- Interactive map of Patinoire municipale de Poitiers
- Capacity: 299 (seated); 810 (total)
- Field size: 56 × 26 metre

Construction
- Opened: 1969

Tenants
- Stade poitevin hockey sur glace (1969–present)

Opened in 1969 across the street from Centre sportif de la Ganterie, the ice rink was part of the same redevelopment wave but was originally a separate, private venture. It has since then become a public facility. In 2013–2014, it underwent renovations for aesthetic and environmental purposes, during which it was connected to the swimming pool by a waste heat recovery system.

In 2017, it was at the center of a feud for ice time between World Champion figure skater Brian Joubert's new club and his former Stade poitevin club de glace.

It is home to the Stade Poitevin ice hockey team. It hosted the French Junior Figure Skating Championships in 2016.
