= Frantz Granvorka =

French volleyball player

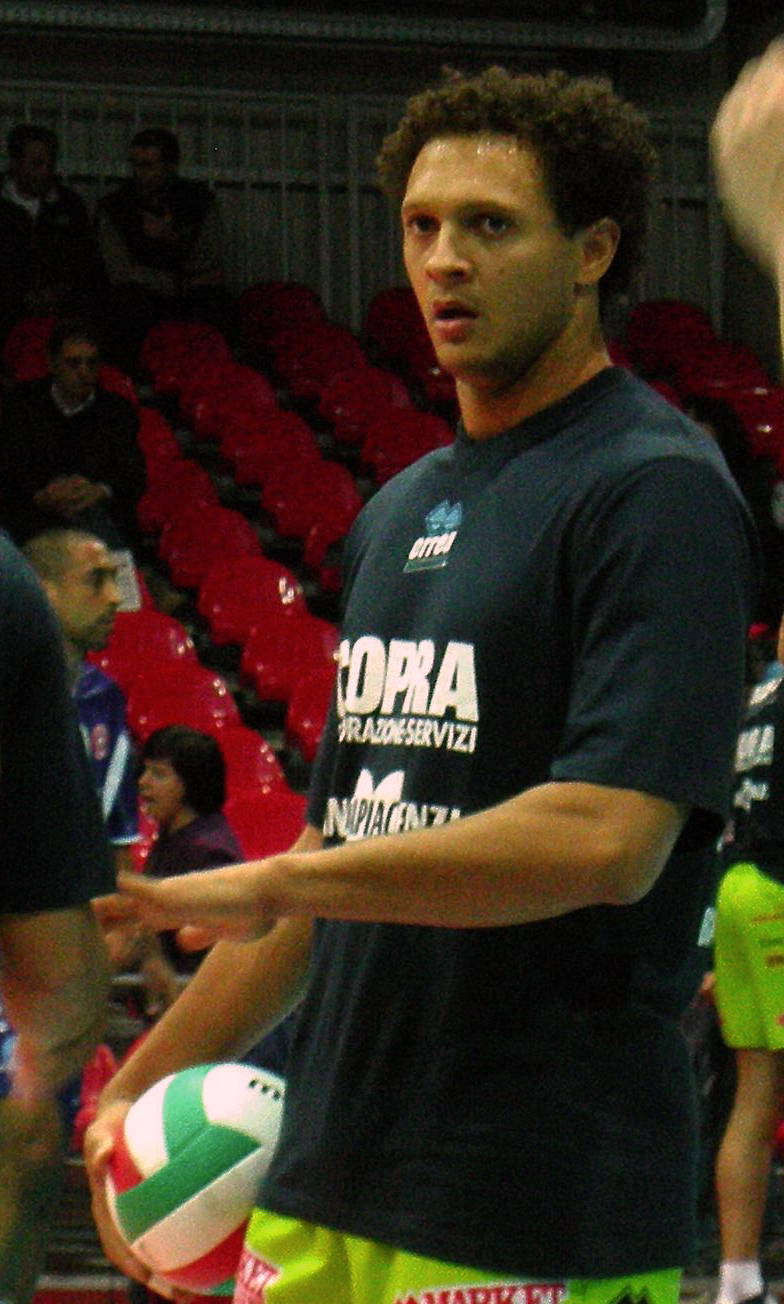

Personal information
- Nationality: French
- Born: 10 March 1976 (age 50); Champigny-sur-Marne, France
- Height: 1.95 m (6 ft 5 in)
- Weight: 90 kg (198 lb)
- Spike: 364 cm (143 in)
- Block: 327 cm (129 in)

Volleyball information
- Position: Outside hitter

Career
Years	Teams
1992–1994; 1994–1996; 1996–1997; 1997–1998; 1998–1999; 1999–2001; 2001–2002; 2002–2003; 2003–2004; 2004; 2004–2006; 2006–2007; 2007–2008; 2008–2009; 2009–2010; 2010–2011	CNVB; Asnières Volley; Paris Volley; Asnières Volley; Paris Volley; Pallavolo Parma; Sempre Volley; PV Cuneo; AdriaVolley Trieste; Iraklis Thessaloniki; BluVolley Verona; Prisma Volley; Volley Piacenza; Prisma Volley; Ziraat Bankası Ankara; Beauvais Oise UC

National team
1996–2007	France
Honours
Men's volleyball
Representing France
World Championship
Bronze medal – third place	2002 Argentina
World League
Silver medal – second place	2006 Moscow
European Championship
Silver medal – second place	2003 Germany
- Last updated: 2 January 2018

Frantz Granvorka (born 10 March 1976) is a French former volleyball player, a member of France men's national team in 1996–2007, a participant of the 2004 Olympic Games, a bronze medalist of the 2002 World Championship, a silver medalist of the 2003 European Championship, 1997 French Champion.

== Career ==
French national team, including Granvorka, achieved bronze medal of the 2002 World Championship. Granvorka received individual award for the Best Server of tournament. In 2004, he took part in 2004 Olympic Games and his national team of France took 9th place.

== Sporting achievements ==
=== Clubs ===
==== CEV Champions League ====
- 2007/2008 - with Volley Piacenza

==== National championships ====
- 1996/1997 French Cup, with Paris Volley
- 1996/1997 French Championship, with Paris Volley
- 1998/1999 French Cup, with Asnières Volley
- 2003/2004 Greek Cup, with Iraklis Thessaloniki
- 2007/2008 Italian Championship, with Volley Piacenza
- 2009/2010 Turkish Cup, with Ziraat Bankası Ankara
- 2009/2010 Turkish Championship, with Ziraat Bankası Ankara

=== Individually ===
- 2002 FIVB World Championship - Best Server

Awards
Preceded by (Serbia and Montenegro) Goran Vujević	Best Server of FIVB World Championship; 2002	Succeeded by (Bulgaria) Matey Kaziyski
