= Centre sportif des Courtilles =

French multisports facility

- Interactive map of Centre sportif des Courtilles
- Full name: Centre sportif d'Asnières-sur-Seine
- Address: 1 boulevard Pierre de Coubertin
- Location: Asnières-sur-Seine, France
- Surface: 27,650 m^{2}
- Public transit: Asnières-Genevilliers–Les Courtilles

Construction
- Built: 1962–1975 (core facilities)
- Years active: 1964–present

Centre sportif d'Asnières-sur-Seine, commonly known as Centre sportif des Courtilles, is a multisports facility located in the Paris suburb of Asnières-sur-Seine, Hauts-de-Seine, France.
It is part of the Cité des Courtilles, a social housing residential area located in the northern part of Asnières, which also includes a shopping district, Centre commercial des Courtilles, and used to include an eponymous school.

The project's first phase, in the early 1960s, consisted of a gymnasium and a swimming pool. It was stretched to the south in the early 1970s with the construction of an ice rink. A tennis park was built in its center in the mid-1970s.
A boxing gym, a fencing hall, an archery range and a soccer training pitch were later fit out in the complex's facilities.

== Piscine et gymnase des Courtilles ==
Piscine et gymnase des Courtilles
- Interactive map of Piscine et gymnase des Courtilles
- Capacity: 625 (seated); 800 (total)

Construction
- Opened: 27 November 1964 (inauguration ceremony)
- Architect: Jean-Claude Dondel and Roger Dhuit
- Main contractor: Groupement Rheims et Debout

Tenant
- Asnières Volley 92

The northern part of the Sports Center consists of two adjoining buildings, which together formed the first phase of the development.

=== Gymnase des Courtilles ===
The gymnasium is the home court for five-time French volleyball Champions Asnières Volley 92, which also acted as the volleyball section of Paris Saint-Germain between the 1992–93 and 1994–95 seasons. During those years, the team split its games between Gymnase des Courtilles and Halle Georges Carpentier in Paris.

=== Piscine Franck Esposito ===
The aquatic center opened to the public in the summer of 1964. A formal inauguration ceremony was held in November of that year, attended by Olympic medallist Christine Caron and ministers Maurice Herzog and Christian Fouchet. Initially just called Piscine des Courtilles, it underwent an extensive renovation in 2003, expanding it from two to four pools ranging from a paddling area to a 25-metre pool. On that occasion, it took the name of FINA World Championship and Olympic medallist Franck Esposito.

== Ice rink ==
Patinoire olympique d'Asnières-sur-Seine
- Interactive map of Patinoire olympique d'Asnières-sur-Seine
- Capacity: 1421 (seated); 2239 (total)
- Field size: 60 × 30 metre

Construction
- Opened: 19 October 1970

Tenant
- Castors d'Asnières (1972–present)

Patinoire olympique d'Asnières-sur-Seine, commonly known as Patinoire des Courtilles, is a multisports venue located in the southern part of the Centre sportif des Courtilles. It is named after and primarily known for its main hall which houses the city's permanent ice rink, although other activities are hosted by the venue's secondary facilities.
Plans for the new building were approved in 1966 and it opened in 1970. It features a 60 × 30 metre Olympic-sized track, with seating for 1,421 spectators. It is the home ice for semi-professional ice hockey team Castors d'Asnières.
It hosted the French Figure Skating Championships on three occasions (1976, 1982 and 2003), in addition to hosting the French Ice Dancing Championships in 1973, when the event was still held as a standalone fixture. It also hosted the French Short Track Speed Skating Championships in 1999.

=== Boxing ===
The ice rink building also houses a boxing gym, managed by the local Asnières Boxing Club, a member of the French Boxing Federation. In June 2014, former cruiserweight World Champion Jean-Marc Mormeck fought the first fight of his short-lived comeback in the main hall of the Patinoire olympique.

== Tennis des Courtilles ==
Following the ice rink's entry into service, the outdoor area between it and the swimming pool/gymnasium to the north was set aside for tennis. The new Tennis des Courtilles was inaugurated on 27 September 1975.
Originally designed for eight courts featuring both carpet (Matéflex) and clay, the facility was converted to a low-maintenance asphalt surface in the mid-1980s, and scaled back to two courts with the remaining area used for a recreational synthetic soccer pitch.
