= Stade Poitevin Poitiers =

French men's volleyball club

- Full name: Alterna Stade Poitevin Volley-Ball
- Short name: SPVB, les Blacks
- Founded: 1973
- Ground: Salle Frédéric Lawson-Body (Capacity: 3,200)
- Chairman: Claude Berrard
- Manager: Brice Donat
- Captain: Giacomo Raffaelli
- League: LNV Ligue A
- 2023–24: 11th
- Website: Club home page

Uniforms
Home	Away

Stade Poitevin Poitiers is a French volleyball club from Poitiers and plays in the LNV Ligue A.

Club originally was founded in 1973 and reorganised in 2012 after compulsory liquidation.

== Honours ==
Pro A

- Winner: 1999, 2011

Coupe de France

- Winner: 1996, 2002, 2014, 2020
- Finalist: 2003

== See also ==
- France men's national volleyball team
