= Jean-Claude Dondel and Roger Dhuit =

French architects

Jean-Claude Dondel (1904 – 1989) and Roger Dhuit (1910 – 1995) were a team of French architects.

== Career ==
Dondel came to notice at the Viard & Dastugue study, where he co-designed the Museum of Modern Art of the City of Paris for the 1937 World's Fair. Dhuit spent some of his early years working for Henri Bernard.

Dondel and Dhuit started their formal collaboration in 1955. Both men owned the government-sanctioned title of Architecte en chef des bâtiments civils et palais nationaux (English: Chief Architect of Civilian Buildings and National Palaces) which, before more open competitions became standard in the early 1980s, positioned them as prime candidates to design public sports and educational facilities in the country. Dondel was also an architecture advisor to the French Ministry of Education.

In 1963 Dondel and Dhuit, in association with Dhuit's former mentor Henri Bernard, won the tender to design a proposed 100,000 seat national stadium in Vincennes, but the project stalled and was later abandoned in favor of a rebuild of the existing Parc des Princes.

Dondel and Dhuit instead made their mark producing more utilitarian buildings, albeit at a very high rate, in order to satisfy France's rapid demographic growth. Some of their less expensive projects re-used previous design templates. Within a relatively short span of eleven years, their partnership is credited with some thirty schools across French territory, in addition to many sports facilities.

Following his collaboration with Dhuit, Dondel was part of another team that designed the Iris model of prefabricated swimming pool in 1971. It was selected for large scale production by the French Ministry of Youth and Sports as part of the Plan 1000 piscines (English: 1000-Pools Plan), an effort to increase France's then limited network of aquatic facilities. Fifty-four of them were made.

== Selected works ==
=== Dondel and Dhuit ===
- Piscine-gymnase des Courtilles, Asnières-sur-Seine
- Université de Savoie, Jacob-Bellecombette
- École normale supérieure, Montrouge
- Cité scolaire Gabriel-Fauré, Paris
- Lycée Maurice-Ravel, Paris
- Lycée Paul-Valéry, Paris
- Salle Frédéric-Lawson-Body, Poitiers
- Piscine-patinoire Bocquaine, Reims

=== Dondel ===
- Université Paris-Saclay – Faculty of Pharmacy, Chatenay-Malabry
- Lycée Carnot, Paris (renovation only)
- Complexe sportif René-Thys, Reims

=== Dhuit ===
- French National School for the Judiciary, Bordeaux

== Bibliography ==
- Julie Guiyot-Corteville, ed. (September 2021). "Jean-Claude Dondel et Roger Dhuit : un duo hors pair dans le paysage scolaire parisien". Les lycées d'Île-de-France. Lyon: Éditions Lieux dits. pp. 142–144. ISBN 9782362191909.
