= Régis Racine =

French basketball player

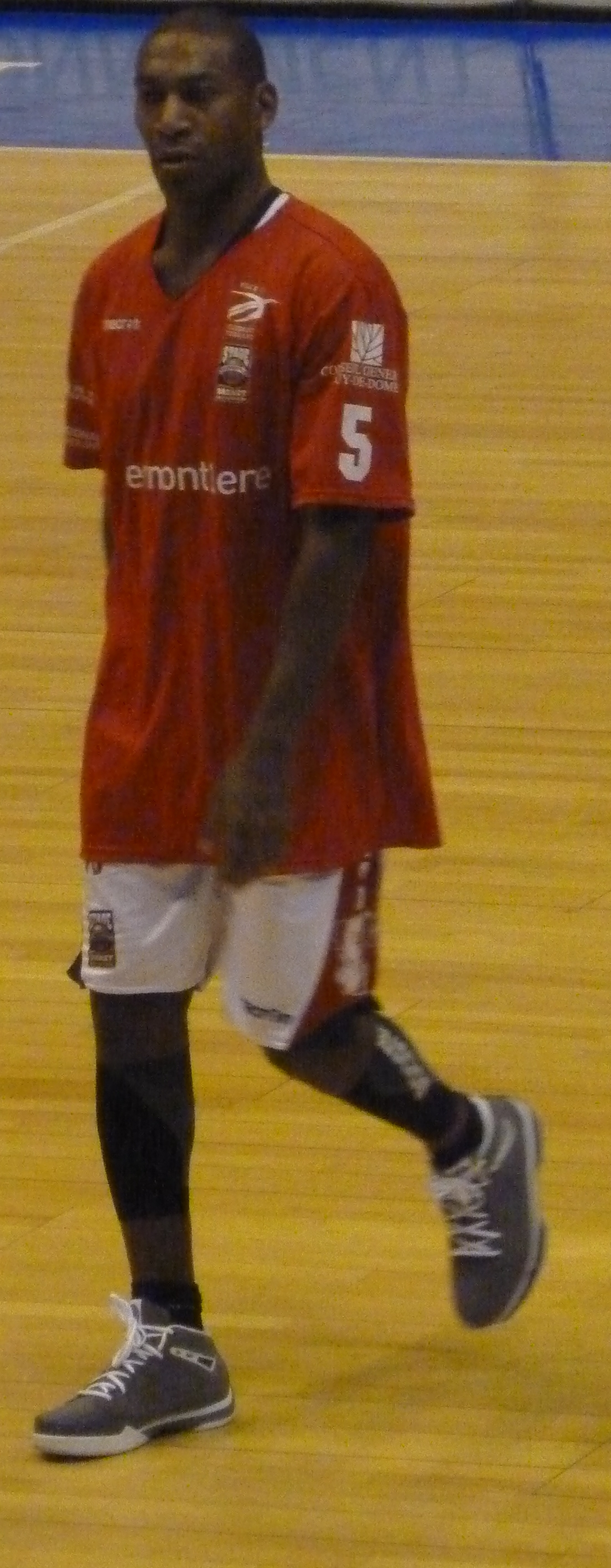
Régis Racine on 9 March at the Palais de sports de Clermont-Ferrand during a 3rd division game between Stade clermontois basket Auvergne (Racine's team) and Blois Basket.

Régis Racine (born 13 October 1970 in Paris, France) is a French basketball player who played 3 games for the men's French national team in 1994 .
