= Jean-Claude Bouttier =

French actor and boxer (1944–2019)

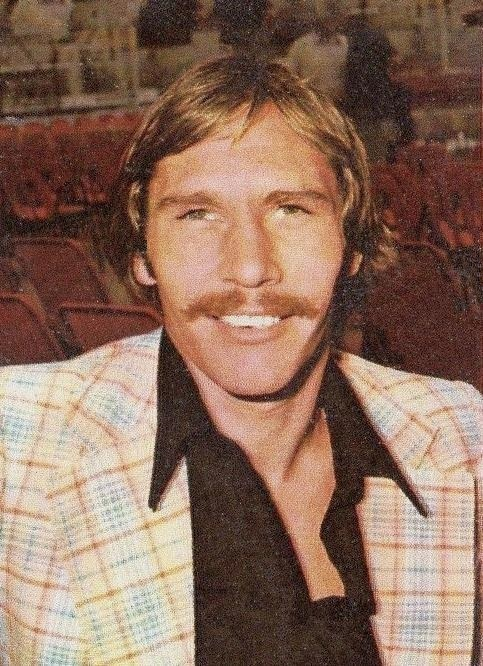
- Jean-Claude Bouttier c. 1972

Personal information
- Nationality: French
- Born: 13 October 1944 Besançon, France
- Died: 3 August 2019 (aged 74)
- Height: 1.77 m (5 ft 10 in)
- Weight: Middleweight

Boxing career
- Stance: Orthodox

Boxing record
- Total fights: 72
- Wins: 64
- Win by KO: 43
- Losses: 7
- Draws: 1

Jean-Claude Bouttier (13 October 1944 – 3 August 2019) was a French actor and professional boxer. During his boxing career, which spanned from 1965 to 1974, he won 64 out of 72 bouts, 43 of them by knockout. In June 1971 he won the European Boxing Union (EBU) middleweight title, and in 1972 and 1973 unsuccessfully contested the WBC and WBA titles against Carlos Monzon. He lost the EBU title to Kevin Finnegan in May 1974.

Bouttier started his film career by playing himself in TV series, while still boxing. His later roles involved proper acting, such as Philippe Rouget in Les Uns et les Autres. Since 1984, he worked as a sports commentator for Canal+.
