= Jacques Yoko =

French-Cameroonian volleyball player (born 1972)

Jacques Yoko Kwed

Personal information
- Nationality: Cameroon, France
- Born: 29 April 1972 (age 54); Paris, France
- Height: 197 cm (6 ft 6 in)
- Weight: 88 kg (194 lb)
- Spike: 352 cm (139 in)
- Block: 323 cm (127 in)

Volleyball information
- Number: 10 (national team)

Career
Years	Teams
1990	(France)

National team
1990; 1996-2000	Cameroon; France

Jacques Yoko Kwed (born 29 April 1972 in Paris) is a former French-Cameroonian male volleyball player. He was part of the Cameroon men's national volleyball team at the 1990 FIVB Volleyball Men's World Championship in Brazil. On club level he played in France. In the late 1990s he played for the France men's national volleyball team.

== International Competitions ==
- 1997 – European Championship (4th place)
- 2000 – World League (7th place)
