= Paris Saint-Germain Boxing =

French professional boxing club

- Full name: Paris Saint-Germain Boxing
- Short name(s): PSG Boxing
- Founded: 1992; 34 years ago
- Disbanded: 1997; 29 years ago
- Gym(s): Parc des Princes
- President: Jean-Claude Bouttier
- Coach(es): René Acquaviva; Gilbert Delé

Paris Saint-Germain Boxing, commonly known as PSG Boxing, was a French professional boxing club based in Paris, France. It operated as the boxing department of Paris Saint-Germain FC. The section was established in 1992 on the initiative of former French professional boxer Jean-Claude Bouttier and trained at a dedicated boxing gym located within the Parc des Princes. Throughout its existence, the club was led by president Bouttier, along with managers René Acquaviva and Gilbert Delé, and featured a roster of prominent French boxers.

PSG Boxing quickly assembled a competitive team, including fighters such as Philippe Desavoye, Djamel Lifa, Julien Lorcy, Hacine Cherifi, Patrice Aouissi, Ludovic Proto, Philippe Michel, Tshimanga M'Biye, and Khalid Rahilou. The boxers trained at the gym established in 1993 and competed at national and international levels during the mid-1990s, bringing professional boxing under the wider PSG sporting umbrella.

During its five years of competition, PSG Boxing achieved notable success, winning four French championships, three European titles, and one world championship. Among its principal achievements were Patrice Aouissi's French and European cruiserweight titles, Julien Lorcy and Djamel Lifa's European championships, and Khalid Rahilou's WBA light welterweight world title. The section entered its final phase following the departure of head coach René Acquaviva in mid-1997. With limited support from the French Boxing Federation, PSG Boxing was disbanded later that year, and the boxing gym at the Parc des Princes was closed.

== History ==
=== Foundation and national titles ===
In September 1992, Paris Saint-Germain FC and its owners Canal+ established a boxing department under the leadership of Jean-Claude Bouttier, a former two-time European middleweight champion in the 1970s. Led by Charles Biétry, PSG's multisport project also included active sections in handball, judo, volleyball, rugby league, and basketball. Bouttier presented the project to Biétry, a noted boxing enthusiast, who approved it. Although the section was created in 1992, it was not legally formalized until October 1993.

Initially, under the direction of René Acquaviva, former coach of the French amateur national team, five boxers joined the PSG pool: flyweight Philippe Desavoye, featherweight Djamel Lifa, lightweight Julien Lorcy, middleweight Hacine Cherifi, and light heavyweight Patrice Aouissi. These five promising fighters, most of whom had competed at the 1992 Summer Olympics in Barcelona, Spain, discovered the professional ranks with PSG Boxing. In 1993, Bouttier expanded the project by opening a boxing gym inside the Parc des Princes in early September and strengthening the technical staff with the recruitment of former World Boxing Association (WBA) super welterweight world champion Gilbert Delé. Ambitious and innovative, PSG Boxing began to unsettle the traditionally conservative French boxing establishment.

At the beginning of 1994, two PSG boxers—Djamel Lifa and Patrice Aouissi—won French national titles, while Hacine Cherifi suffered the only setback and soon left the club to return to Lyon. In May, Bouttier confirmed further recruitment, and by the end of the year nine boxers were competing for PSG, following the arrivals of Ludovic Proto (welterweight), Philippe Michel (light heavyweight), Tshimanga M'Biye (super middleweight), and, most notably, reigning European super lightweight champion Khalid Rahilou.

=== International success and dissolution ===
On 14 March 1995, Patrice Aouissi won the cruiserweight title by knocking out Ukrainian boxer Alexander Gurov in three rounds. Later that year, on 7 October 1995, Philippe Michel challenged Germany's Dariusz Michalczewski for the world title but lost on points after a commendable performance. The year also marked the rise of Julien "Bobo" Lorcy, who carried French boxing hopes following a successful tour of the United States. Meanwhile, Rahilou retained his European title on 8 September 1995 against Denmark's Søren Søndergaard, winning by retirement in the tenth round, earning a future world title opportunity.

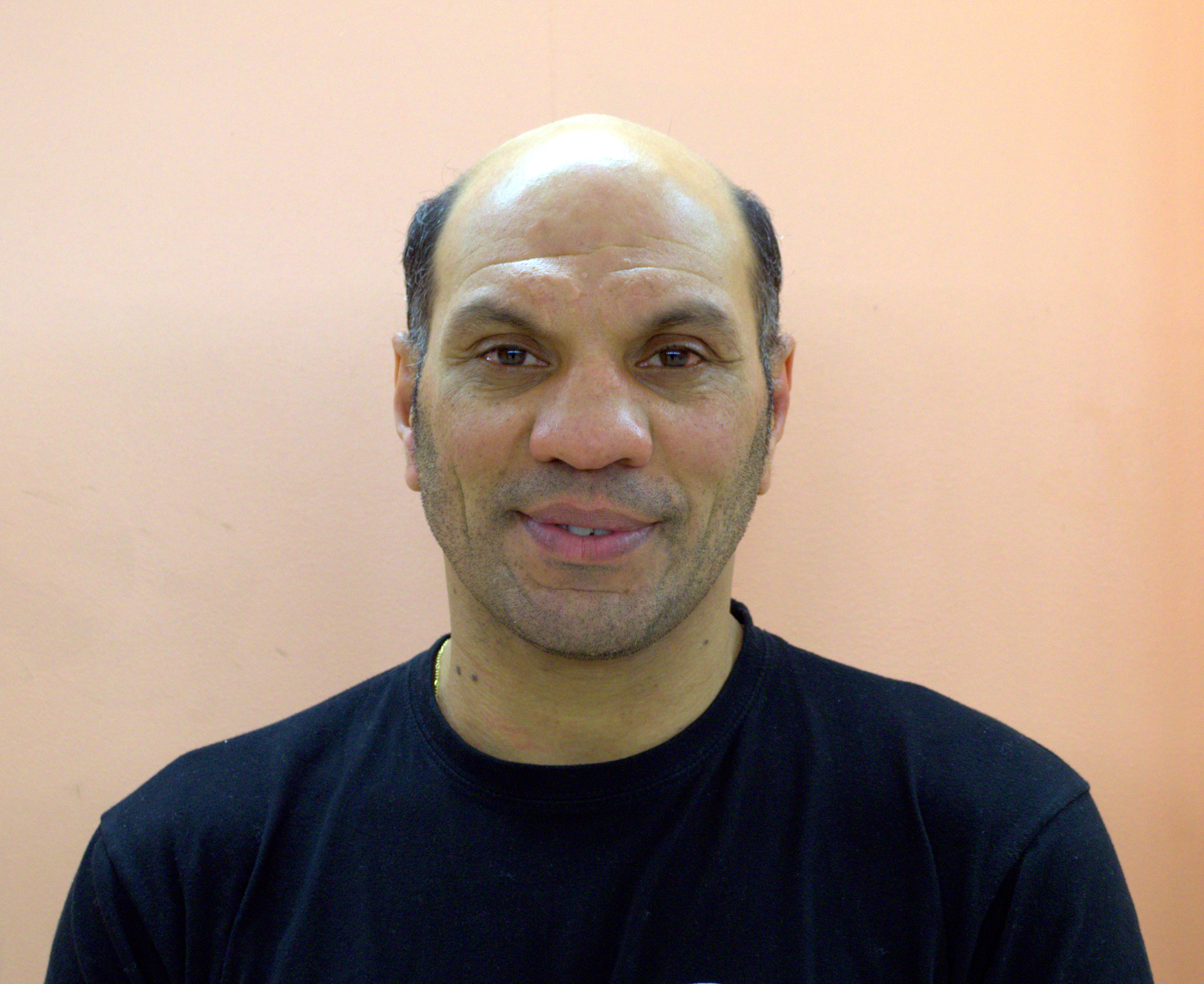
PSG boxer Hacine Cherifi.

On 3 February 1996 in Levallois, Djamel Lifa unsuccessfully challenged for the European super featherweight title, losing on points to Russia's Anatoly Alexandrov. On 6 July, Patrice Aouissi had a world title opportunity in Hyères but was forced to retire in the ninth round against Argentina's Marcelo Domínguez after having been competitive for much of the fight. Aouissi was visibly frustrated and dissatisfied with the coaching of René Acquaviva. Later that year, Julien Lorcy was crowned European champion after knocking out Boris Sinitsin in the seventh round.

On 11 January 1997 in Nashville, Khalid Rahilou caused a major upset by defeating American Frankie Randall to become WBA light welterweight world champion. It marked the first time since Alphonse Halimi in 1957 that a French boxer had won a world title on U.S. soil. Meanwhile, Aouissi's decline continued as he lost the European cruiserweight title to England's Johnny Nelson by referee stoppage in the seventh round on 23 February 1997. The defeat went largely unnoticed, coming just three days before Julien Lorcy's first world title opportunity against Mexico's Arnulfo Castillo for the vacant WBO super-featherweight belt. After a high-quality bout at the Halle Georges Carpentier, the fight ended in a draw, a result widely regarded as harsh on the Frenchman, who had dominated the closing stages. A rematch was discussed immediately after the contest.

On the European stage, Djamel Lifa was finally crowned European champion on 5 April 1997 after defeating Moussa Sangare in Thiais, with the referee stopping the contest due to injury in the sixth round. He successfully defended the title five months later in Besançon, winning on points against Russia's Boris Sinitsin. PSG Boxing were then at the peak of their success, and on 5 July, the Franco-Moroccan Kalid Rahilou defeated American Marty Jakubowski by referee stoppage in the seventh round to retain his world title. On 4 October, Lorcy faced Castillo again in a highly anticipated rematch in Villebon-sur-Yvette, which ended once more in a draw.

Despite its sporting successes, the PSG Boxing project, initiated by Jean-Claude Bouttier, entered its final phase with the departure of head coach René Acquaviva in the summer of 1997. Frustrated by the lack of support from the French Boxing Federation, PSG quietly disbanded one of its most successful sections and closed its boxing gym at the Parc des Princes.

=== Aftermath and legacy ===
1998 nevertheless proved to be a year of consecration for the former Parisian boxers. On 21 February 1998, Rahilou successfully defended his world title against fellow Frenchman Jean-Baptiste Mendy at the Bercy Arena, winning on points, while minutes earlier his teammate Djamel Lifa lost his European title to Anatoly Alexandrov by judges' decision. Two months later, another former PSG Boxing member also captured a world title, as Hacine Chérifi was crowned world champion in Villeurbanne after defeating American Keith Holmes, becoming the first Frenchman to do so in the middleweight division since the legendary Marcel Cerdan.

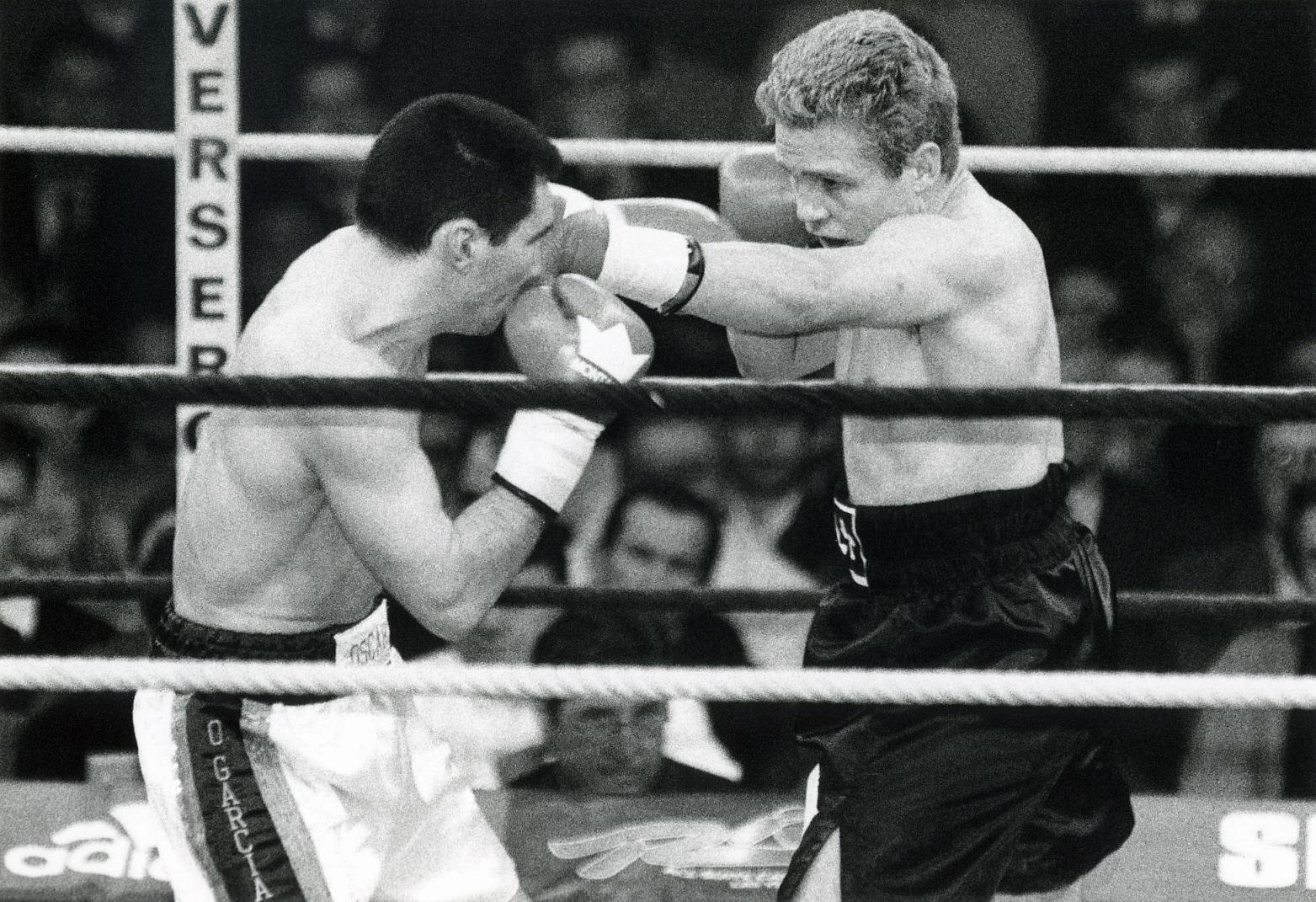
PSG boxer Julien Lorcy (right) in action.

Despite another setback on 16 May 1998 against Anatoly Alexandrov—the same opponent who had defeated Lifa a few months earlier—Julien Lorcy continued to bide his time. On 10 October, Rahilou lost his world title at Bercy to American Sharmba Mitchell. However, on 10 April 1999, Lorcy finally captured his first world title after moving up more than three kilograms in weight, defeating his compatriot and reigning champion Jean-Baptiste Mendy at Bercy. The victory came after the bout was stopped in the sixth round and served as a fitting farewell gift to PSG Boxing, which had ceased to exist as a legal entity some two weeks earlier.

Charles Biétry later reflected on the venture, noting that PSG Boxing had been launched with a small group of fighters and the ambition of bringing a more structured and positive approach to French boxing, but acknowledging the complexity and resistance of the sport's traditional environment. Former head coach René Acquaviva also looked back on the project, explaining that PSG Boxing had initially been intended as a short-term initiative lasting two or three years, yet ultimately operated for five seasons. He added that the section's success—producing four French champions, three European champions, and one world champion—eventually generated opposition within the boxing establishment.

It was therefore pressure from within the boxing establishment that ultimately led to the closure of PSG's boxing section. After finally achieved world champion status, Julien Lorcy explained his attachment to the club and its identity, notably his wish to retain the PSG crest on his trunks, which he regarded as symbolic and sacred. In June 1999, Lorcy parted ways with his long-time coach René Acquaviva and later lost his world title to Italian boxer Stefano Zoff. Of the 30 French boxers to have won a world championship since Georges Carpentier in 1920, three—Kalid Rahilou, Hacine Cherifi, and Julien Lorcy—passed through PSG Boxing, an exceptional record that underscored the remarkable, albeit short-lived, success of the section.

== Grounds ==
The club's training facility was located at the Parc des Princes, home of French football team Paris Saint-Germain FC, the parent club of PSG Boxing. In early September 1993, PSG Boxing president and founder Jean-Claude Bouttier, with the approval of the parent club and PSG sports club chairman Charles Biétry, inaugurated a dedicated boxing gym within the stadium. The gym served as the home of PSG Boxing until the section was disbanded and the facility closed in the summer of 1997.

== Honours ==
=== French Boxing Federation ===
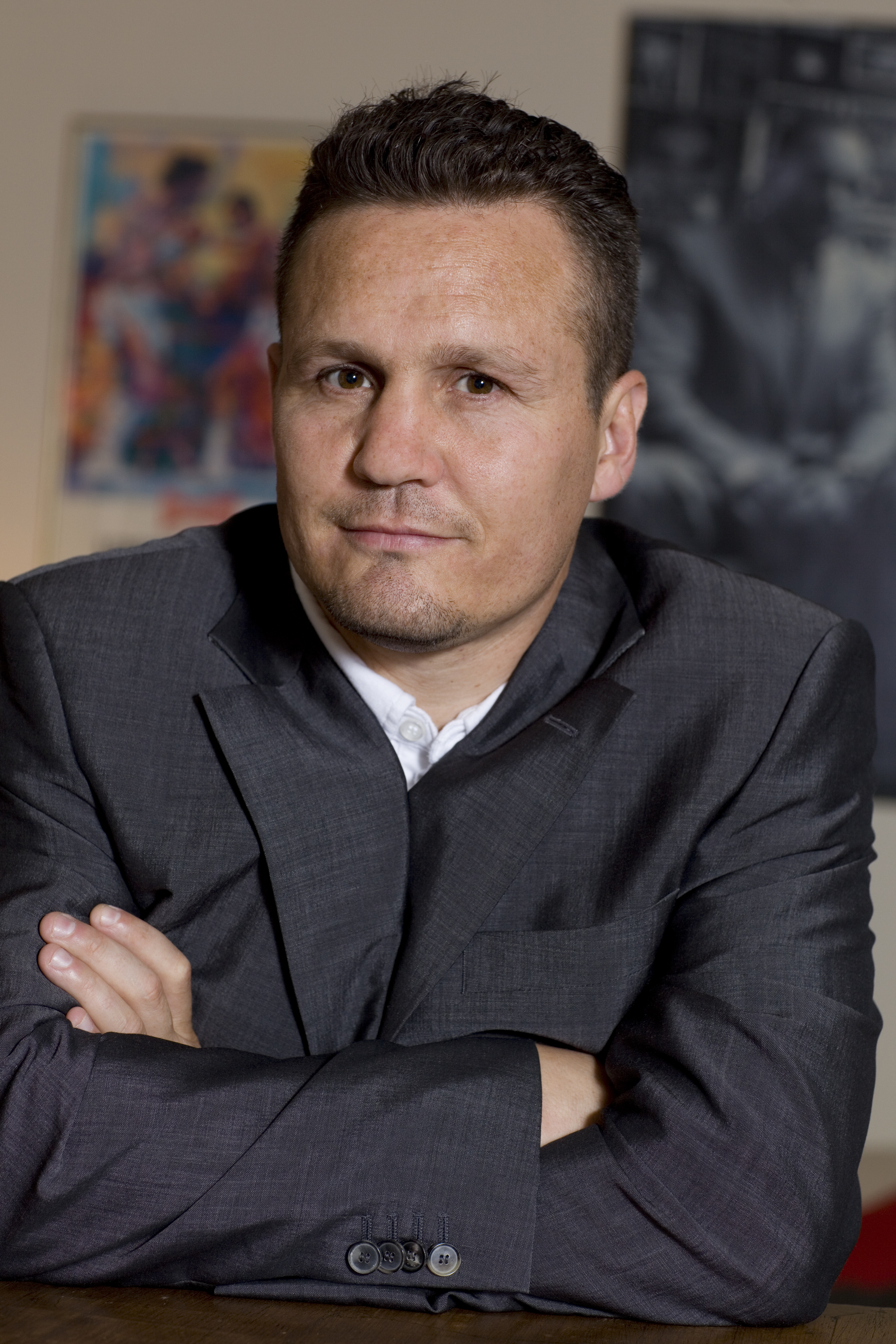
Julien Lorcy

- Cruiserweight (1)
  - (France) Patrice Aouissi – 1994.
- Super featherweight (1)
  - (France) Djamel Lifa – 1994.
- Flyweight (1)
  - (France) Philippe Desavoye – 1995.
- Light heavyweight (1)
  - (France) Philippe Michel – 1997.

=== European Boxing Union ===
- Cruiserweight (1)
  - (France) Patrice Aouissi – 1995.
- Super featherweight (2)
  - (France) Julien Lorcy – 1996.
  - (France) Djamel Lifa – 1997.

=== World Boxing Association ===
- Light welterweight (1)
  - (France) Khalid Rahilou – 1997.

== Personnel ==
=== Staff ===
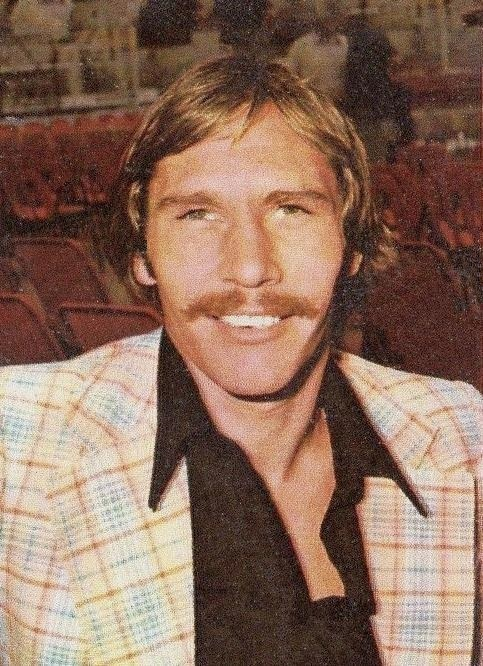
Jean-Claude Bouttier

Position	Name	Paris Saint-Germain	Source
President	(France) Jean-Claude Bouttier	1992–1997	
Manager	(France) René Acquaviva	1993–1997	
Assistant manager	(France) Gilbert Delé	1993–1997	

=== Boxers ===
Boxer	Paris Saint-Germain	Weight class	Source
(France) Philippe Desavoye	Flyweight	1993–1997	
(France) Djamel Lifa	Featherweight	1993–1997	
(France) Julien Lorcy	Lightweight	1993–1997	
(France) Hacine Cherifi	Middleweight	1993–1994	
(France) Patrice Aouissi	Light-heavyweight	1993–1997	
(France) Ludovic Proto	Welterweight	1994–1997	
(France) Philippe Michel	Light-heavyweight	1994–1997	
(Democratic Republic of the Congo) Tshimanga M'Biye	Super-middleweight	1994–1997	
(France) Khalid Rahilou	Super-lightweight	1994–1997	
