= Gérard Drouot =

French artistic director (1952–2022)

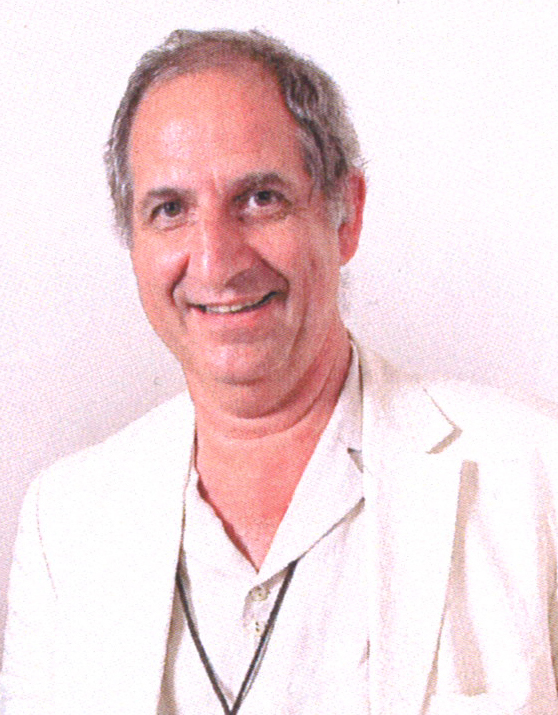
- Drouot in 2016
- Born: 29 April 1952; Reims, France
- Died: 10 January 2022 (aged 69); Paris, France
- Occupation: Artistic director

Gérard Drouot (English: /druːˈoʊ/ droo-OH, French: [ʒeʁaʁ dʁuo]; 29 April 1952 – 10 January 2022) was a French artistic director and live performance producer. He produced thousands of concerts and was one of the major players of French musical production.

== Biography ==
While he was studying medicine, Drouot began his show production activities in Reims in 1973. In April 1974, he co-founded the association Musique Action Reims, which presented artists such as Magma, Zao, Au Bonheur des Dames, Ange, Gong, The Clash, Terry Riley, Klaus Schulze, and others. On 9 June 1976, he organized his first major concert in Reims with Leonard Cohen. In 1974, with Richard Branson, he helped put together an event which headlined Nico and Tangerine Dream in the Reims Cathedral. A documentary on the event, titled "Reims 74, Rock Goes to the Cathedral", was released in 2012.

In November 1977, Drouout was hired at the Harry Lapp Organisation in Strasbourg and stayed there for nine years, organizing concerts for the likes of U2, Frankie Goes to Hollywood, Charlélie Couture, Étienne Daho, Graeme Allwright, and others.

In May 1986, he founded Gérard Drouot Productions, putting on concerts for Patricia Kaas, Axelle Red, AC/DC, Mary J. Blige, Bruce Springsteen, Elton John, R. Kelly, Santana, and others. In 1999, he began to work on the reformation of French rock group Téléphone. However, the band did not return until 2015 and, thanks to Drouot's promotion, sold over 200,000 seats on the first day tickets were available for their tour. Between 2008 and 2014, he organized 24 concerts for Leonard Cohen in his return to France.

In 2009, Drouot was tasked with organizing a Michael Jackson concert in Paris, scheduled for August or September 2010. However, the concert did not take place due to the singer's death. He then became owner of Hellfest, a French music festival. He was known as one of the first organizers of cine-concerts in France, concerts which played music from films such as Back to the Future, Titanic, West Side Story, Raiders of the Lost Ark, and The Lord of the Rings.

Drouot was close with multiple musical artists, such as Melody Gardot, Bono, U2, Bruce Springsteen, Elton John, Leonard Cohen, and Asaf Avidan. He was known for convincing international music stars to perform in concerts throughout France and not just in Paris. His son, Matthieu, became Deputy Chief Executive Officer of Gérard Drouot Productions in 2013. In 2019, the company organized a David Hallyday concert at the Salle Pleyel in Paris. In 2020, he spoke on the COVID-19 pandemic and its impacts on shows and concerts. He was then forced to cancel dozens of concerts and postpone about a hundred more.

He died of leukaemia in Paris on 10 January 2022, at the age of 69.
