= Problem-Solving Group =

Problem-Solving Group (PSG) is a team of problem management and technical support staff that is formed to investigate and diagnose a recurring IT problem.

== Background ==
The concept of the Problem-Solving Group was introduced in ITIL Service Operation 2007 but was removed from ITIL Service Operation 2011.

== Definition ==
The ITIL Service Operation manual describes the purpose of a Problem-Solving Group as follows:

The actual solving of problems is likely to be undertaken by one or more technical support groups and/or suppliers or support contractors – under the coordination of the Problem Manager.

Where an individual problem is serious enough to warrant it, a dedicated problem management team should be formulated to work together in overcoming that particular problem. The Problem Manager has a role to play in making sure that the correct number and level of resources is available in the team and for escalation and communication up the management chain of all organizations concerned.

A paper with a more detailed description of a PSG was presented at a meeting of the British Computer Society at the University of Northampton.

== See also ==
- ITIL v3 problem management
