= Héctor López (volleyball) =

Spanish volleyball player (born 1971)

Hector Lopez

Personal information
- Full name: Héctor Gregorio López Izquierdo
- Nickname: Héctor Izquierdo
- Nationality: Spanish
- Born: September 17, 1971 (age 55); Santa Cruz de Tenerife, Spain

Héctor López (born 17 September 1971) is a Spanish former volleyball player who competed in the 1992 Summer Olympics.
