= Chris Singleton (basketball, born 1957) =

American basketball player

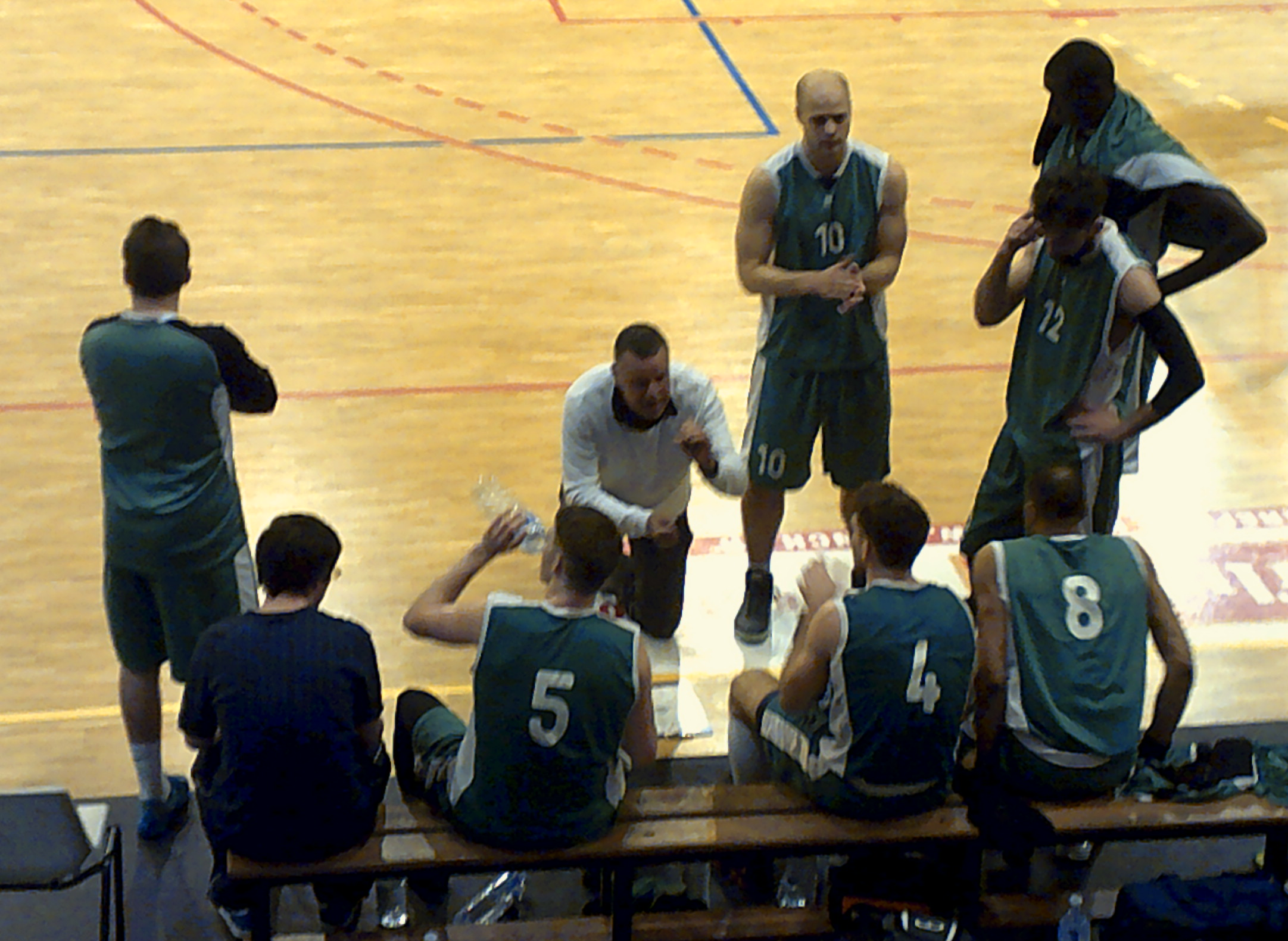
Singleton coaching ASA Sceaux in April 2015

Christopher Singleton (born May 2, 1957) is an American-French basketball journalist and former professional basketball player and coach.

== Career ==
Singleton was born in Brooklyn to a French mother and an American father. His father served in the US Army. Singleton grew up in Europe, before moving to Los Angeles, California, with his family when he was five years of age. He started his collegiate career at Allan Hancock College and then transferred to Montana State University. A 6’4’’ forward, Singleton got his professional career underway with Vendée Challans Basket in France in 1979. He played for the team from 1979 to 1984 and later played for two other French clubs, Reims Champagne Basket and Saint-Quentin Basket-Ball.

In Saint-Quentin, Singleton made the transition to coaching due to problems with his knee. In 1991, he took over the head coaching helm at French N1A side FC Mulhouse Basket, where one of his players was Joe Bryant who had come to Mulhouse with his family including his son Kobe Bryant.

Singleton later served as head coach of French LNB ProA teams Jeanne d'Arc Dijon Bourgogne (1992/93 and 1997 to 2001) and Paris Basket Racing (1993 to 1997). In 1993, he won the French League Cup (Coupe de la Ligue) with Dijon. During his tenure at ALM Évreux Basket (January 2002 to January 2004) in France's second-tier, Singleton coached Saša Dončić, father of Luka Dončić.

In January 2004, Singleton took over as coach at the LNB ProA side Besançon Basket Comté Doubs. Following relegation later that year, he coached the team in the second division. He then served as head coach of third division club Denek Bat Bayonne Urcuit, taking over during the 2006/07 season and staying until 2011. From January 2012 to January 2023, Singleton coached at ASA Sceaux: He first coached the men's team and then guided the women's team to promotion to the third-tier division in France, Nationale 1 féminine.

In 2012, Singleton was hired as a commentator and analyst by Bein Sports. Since then, he has been covering NBA, NCAA and LNB ProA games.
