= Eric N'Gapeth =

French volleyball player (born 1959)

Éric N'Gapeth

Personal information
- Nationality: French
- Born: 17 July 1959; Douala, Cameroon
- Height: 186 cm (6 ft 1 in)
Honours
Representing France
Men's Volleyball
European Championships
Silver medal – second place	1987 Belgium	Team

Éric N'Gapeth (born 17 July 1959 in Douala, Cameroon) is a French former volleyball player and coach who competed at the 1988 Summer Olympics. He is the father of volleyball player Earvin N'Gapeth, who currently plays for the French national volleyball team.
