= Asnières Volley 92 =

- Founded: 1948
- Ground: Gymnase des Courtilles; Asnières-sur-Seine
- Manager: André Patin
- Website: Club home page

Asnières Volley 92 is a French volleyball team based in Asnières-sur-Seine, Hauts-de-Seine. The flagship men's team and its affiliates have historically formed one of the most successful organizations in French volleyball, claiming a total of 45 national titles across all age and gender groups as of 2016.
The club was defunded by the city of Asnières and pulled out of the second-level Ligue B Masculine during the 2016 offseason. It later resumed its activities in the amateur Nationale 2 (fourth level).

== History ==
The organization traces its lineage to 1948, when it was founded as the volleyball section of multisports club Asnières Sports. It established itself as one of the country's best, winning five national men's titles between 1965 and 1984. However, following a Coupe de France final appearance in 1986, Asnières Sport declined sharply and went winless in 1988–89, causing it to be relegated.
In 1991–92, the club returned to the national elite (then called Pro A) but only narrowly escaped another relegation. That summer, it was propped up by an injection of funds from soccer's Paris Saint-Germain, which had just launched a diversification plan into other sports, and became known as PSG Asnières Volley for the following three seasons. As PSG Asnières Volley, the team won its sixth French championship in 1993, and its second Coupe de France the following year. In 1995, PSG walked away from the alliance, keeping the team's top flight licence and forcing the Asnières side to resume competing independently at the fourth level under the new name Asnières Volleyball 92.
Asnières reached the top level once more in 1998–99 and fluctuated between the first and second levels (although spending more time at the latter) until 2016 when it pulled out of Ligue B Masculine to focus strictly on amateur competition.

== Honors ==
- French Championship (6)
  - Winner : 1965, 1966, 1979, 1980, 1984, 1993
  - Finalist : 1978, 1982, 1983, 1985
- French Cup (2)
  - Winner : 1984, 1994
