= Christophe Meneau =

French volleyball player (born 1968)

Personal information
- Nationality: French
- Born: 31 January 1968 (age 58)
- Height: 202 cm (6 ft 8 in)
- Weight: 85 kg (187 lb)

Volleyball information
- Number: 6 (national team)

Career
| Years | Teams |
|---|---|
| 1990 | GUC Grenoble |

National team
| 1988-1992 | France |

Christophe Meneau (born 31 January 1968) is a former French male volleyball player. He was part of the France men's national volleyball team at the 1988 Summer Olympics and 1992 Summer Olympics. He also played at the 1990 FIVB Volleyball Men's World Championship in Brazil. He played for GUC Grenoble.

== Clubs ==
- AS Grenoble (1990)
