= Olivier Rossard =

French volleyball player (born 1965)

Personal information
- Nationality: French
- Born: 31 August 1965 (age 59); Les Sables-d'Olonne, France

Sport
- Sport: Volleyball

Olivier Rossard (born 31 August 1965) is a French volleyball player. He competed at the 1988 Summer Olympics and the 1992 Summer Olympics.
