= 2014 Men's European Volleyball League squads =

Below there are the squads from the participating teams of the 2014 Men's European Volleyball League.

== Austria ==
#NR	NAME	BIRTH DATE
1	Philipp Kroiss	2 March 1988 (age 37)
2	Philipp Schneider	23 December 1981 (age 43)
3	Peter Wohlfahrtstätter	10 March 1989 (age 36)
4	Oliver Binder	28 May 1985 (age 40)
5	Martin Postl	11 September 1990 (age 35)
6	Florian Georg Ringseis	9 July 1992 (age 33)
7	Lorenz Koraimann	7 May 1993 (age 32)

== Montenegro ==
#NR	NAME	BIRTHDATE
1	Aleksandar Minić	9 November 1986 (age 38)
2	Marko Vukasinović	30 July 1993 (age 32)
3	Luka Babić	7 July 1994 (age 31)
4	Gojko Cuk	10 October 1988 (age 36)
5	Marko Bojić	13 November 1988 (age 36)
6	Vojin Ćaćić	31 March 1990 (age 35)
7	Ivan Rasović	29 May 1984 (age 41)
8	Milan Marković	20 January 1980 (age 45)
9	Rade Popović	30 June 1992 (age 33)
10	Balša Radunović	12 August 1992 (age 33)
11	Božidar Ćuk	13 June 1992 (age 33)
12	Vuk Medenica	14 February 1989 (age 36)
14	Marko Vujović	14 January 1979 (age 46)
15	Rajko Strugar	11 April 1995 (age 30)
16	Simo Dabović	9 April 1987 (age 38)
17	Ivan Ječmenica	14 March 1990 (age 35)
18	Miloš Čulafić	13 August 1986 (age 39)
19	Nikola Lakcevic	14 July 1995 (age 30)
20	Bojan Strugar	30 June 1995 (age 30)
21	Jovan Ćulafić	30 September 1985 (age 40)
