= 2021 Men's European Volleyball Championship squads =

This article shows all participating team squads at the 2021 Men's European Volleyball Championship, held in Poland, Czech Republic, Estonia and Finland from 1 to 19 September 2021.

== Pool A ==
=== Belgium ===
The following is Belgium roster in the 2021 European Championship.

- Head coach: Fernando Muñoz
- 1 Bram Van Den Dries OP
- 2 Hendrik Tuerlinckx OP
- 3 Sam Deroo OS
- 4 Stijn D'Hulst S
- 7 Lennert Van Elsen MB
- 8 Arno Van De Velde MB
- 9 Wout D'Heer MB
- 12 Matthijs Verhanneman OS
- 13 Elias Thys MB
- 14 Jelle Ribbens L
- 16 Matthias Valkiers S
- 17 Tomas Rousseaux OS
- 20 Mathijs Desmet OS
- 26 Martin Perin L

=== Greece ===
The following is Greece roster in the 2021 European Championship.

- Head coach: Dimitrios Andreopoulos
- 1 Dimitrios Zisis L
- 2 Georgios Papalexiou MB
- 3 Nikos Zoupani OP
- 6 Konstantinos Stivachtis S
- 7 Giorgos Petreas MB
- 9 Menelaos Kokkinakis L
- 10 Rafail Koumentakis OS
- 11 Stavros Kasampalis S
- 12 Theodoros Voulkidis MB
- 13 Charalampos Andreopoulos OS
- 15 Alexandros Raptis OP
- 19 Dimitrios Mouchlias OP
- 22 Dimosthenis Linardos MB
- 77 Athanasios Protopsaltis OS

=== Poland ===
The following is Poland roster in the 2021 European Championship.

- Head coach: Vital Heynen
- 1 Piotr Nowakowski MB
- 5 Łukasz Kaczmarek OP
- 6 Bartosz Kurek OS
- 9 Wilfredo León OS
- 10 Damian Wojtaszek L
- 11 Fabian Drzyzga S
- 12 Grzegorz Łomacz S
- 13 Michał Kubiak OS
- 14 Aleksander Śliwka OS
- 15 Jakub Kochanowski MB
- 16 Kamil Semeniuk OS
- 17 Paweł Zatorski L
- 20 Mateusz Bieniek MB
- 21 Tomasz Fornal OS

=== Portugal ===
The following is Portugal roster in the 2021 European Championship.

- Head coach: Hugo Silva
- 1 Miguel Sinfronio MB
- 2 Gil Pereira L
- 3 André Lopes OS
- 4 Filip Cveticanin MB
- 5 André Marques OS
- 6 Alexandre Ferreira OS
- 7 Ivo Casas L
- 8 Tiago Violas S
- 9 Marco Ferreira OP
- 10 Phelipe Martins MB
- 12 Lourenço Martins OS
- 15 Miguel Tavares S
- 17 José Andrade MB
- 18 Hugo Gaspar OP

=== Serbia ===
The following is Serbia roster in the 2021 European Championship.

- Head coach: Slobodan Kovač
- 1 Aleksandar Okolić MB
- 2 Uroš Kovačević OS
- 4 Nemanja Petrić OS
- 6 Nikola Peković L
- 7 Petar Krsmanović MB
- 8 Marko Ivović OS
- 9 Nikola Jovović S
- 12 Pavle Perić OS
- 14 Aleksandar Atanasijević OP
- 16 Dražen Luburić OP
- 17 Neven Majstorović L
- 18 Marko Podraščanin MB
- 20 Srećko Lisinac MB
- 21 Vuk Todorović S

=== Ukraine ===
The following is Ukraine roster in the 2021 European Championship.

- Head coach: Uģis Krastiņš
- 3 Dmytro Viietskyi OP
- 5 Oleh Plotnytskyi OS
- 6 Maksym Drozd MB
- 7 Horden Brova L
- 8 Dmytro Teryomenko MB
- 9 Volodymyr Ostapenko MB
- 10 Yurii Semeniuk MB
- 11 Vladyslav Didenko S
- 12 Denys Fomin L
- 14 Illia Kovalov OS
- 15 Vitalii Shchytkov S
- 17 Tymofii Poluian OS
- 18 Yan Yereshchenko OS
- 20 Volodymyr Sydorenko OS

== Pool B ==
=== Belarus ===
The following is Belarus roster in the 2021 European Championship.

- Head coach: Viktar Beksha
- 3 Petr Lazuka L
- 6 Uladzislau Babkevich OP
- 8 Artsem Masko OS
- 13 Ilya Burau MB
- 14 Vadzim Pranko MB
- 15 Kanstantsin Tsiushkevich S
- 17 Radzivon Miskevich OP
- 18 Maksim Shkredau MB
- 19 Kanstantsin Panasenko MB
- 20 Maksim Budziukhin L
- 21 Aliaksei Kurash S
- 27 Ilya Marozau OS
- 29 Uladzislau Davyskiba OS

=== Bulgaria ===
The following is Bulgaria roster in the 2021 European Championship.

- Head coach: Silvano Prandi
- 1 Velizar Chernokozhev OP
- 2 Stefan Chavdarov MB
- 3 Nikolay Kolev MB
- 4 Martin Atanasov OS
- 5 Svetoslav Gotsev MB
- 6 Vladimir Stankov S
- 8 Todor Skrimov OS
- 9 Georgi Seganov S
- 11 Aleks Grozdanov MB
- 14 Asparuh Asparuhov OS
- 15 Gordan Lyutskanov OS
- 16 Vladislav Ivanov L
- 19 Tsvetan Sokolov OP
- 24 Martin Ivanov L

=== Czech Republic ===
The following is Czech Republic roster in the 2021 European Championship.

- Head coach: Jiří Novák
- 1 Milan Moník L
- 2 Jan Hadrava OP
- 3 Daniel Pfeffer L
- 5 Adam Zajíček MB
- 6 Michal Finger OP
- 9 Vojtěch Patočka MB
- 12 Martin Licek S
- 13 Jan Galabov OS
- 14 Adam Bartoš OS
- 15 Lukáš Vašina OS
- 18 Jakub Janouch S
- 19 Luboš Bartůněk S
- 22 Oliver Sedláček MB
- 25 Josef Polák MB

=== Italy ===
The following is Italy roster in the 2021 European Championship.

- Head coach: Ferdinando De Giorgi
- 6 Simone Giannelli S
- 7 Fabio Balaso L
- 14 Gianluca Galassi MB
- 15 Riccardo Sbertoli S
- 16 Yuri Romanò OP
- 17 Simone Anzani MB
- 18 Alessandro Michieletto OS
- 19 Daniele Lavia OS
- 21 Alessandro Piccinelli L
- 22 Fabio Ricci MB
- 23 Giulio Pinali OP
- 26 Lorenzo Cortesia MB
- 28 Francesco Recine OS
- 29 Mattia Bottolo OS

=== Montenegro ===
The following is Montenegro roster in the 2021 European Championship.

- Head coach: Veljko Basić
- 1 Aleksandar Minić OP
- 3 Luka Babić OP
- 4 Ivan Zvicer OS
- 5 Rajko Strugar S
- 6 Vojin Ćaćić OS
- 7 Nikola Lakčević L
- 12 Matija Ćinćur MB
- 13 Blažo Milić MB
- 14 Marko Vukašinović OS
- 17 Ivan Ječmenica MB
- 18 Miloš Ćulafić OP
- 18 Nemanja Peruničić L
- 20 Milutin Pavićević OP
- 22 Danilo Dubak S

=== Slovenia ===
The following is Slovenia roster in the 2021 European Championship.

- Head coach: Alberto Giuliani
- 1 Tonček Štern OP
- 2 Alen Pajenk MB
- 4 Jan Kozamernik MB
- 5 Alen Šket OS
- 9 Dejan Vinčić S
- 10 Sašo Štalekar MB
- 11 Žiga Štern OS
- 12 Jan Klobučar L
- 13 Jani Kovačič L
- 15 Matic Videčnik MB
- 16 Gregor Ropret S
- 17 Tine Urnaut OS
- 18 Klemen Čebulj OS
- 19 Rok Možič OS

== Pool C ==
=== Finland ===
The following is Finland roster in the 2021 European Championship.

- Head coach: Joel Banks
- 1 Antti Ronkainen OS
- 2 Eemi Tervaportti S
- 3 Mikko Esko S
- 4 Lauri Kerminen L
- 6 Niklas Seppänen OS
- 7 Niko Suihkonen OS
- 8 Voitto Köykkä L
- 9 Tommi Siirilä MB
- 10 Urpo Sivula OP
- 11 Sauli Sinkkonen MB
- 12 Aaro Nikula OP
- 13 Joonas Jokela OP
- 18 Miki Jauhiainen MB
- 23 Antti Sakari Mäkinen OS

=== Netherlands ===
The following is Netherlands roster in the 2021 European Championship.

- Head coach: Roberto Piazza
- 2 Wessel Keemink S
- 4 Thijs ter Horst OS
- 5 Luuc van der Ent MB
- 6 Just Dronkers L
- 7 Gijs Jorna OS
- 8 Fabian Plak MB
- 12 Bennie Tuinstra OS
- 13 Steven Ottevanger L
- 14 Nimir Abdel-Aziz OP
- 16 Wouter ter Maat OP
- 17 Michaël Parkinson MB
- 18 Robbert Andringa OS
- 19 Freek de Weijer S
- 22 Twan Wiltenburg MB

=== North Macedonia ===
The following is North Macedonia roster in the 2021 European Championship.

- Head coach: Duško Nikolić
- 1 Darko Angelovski L
- 2 Gjorgi Gjorgiev S
- 4 Nikola Gjorgiev OP
- 5 Vlado Milev OS
- 7 Slave Nakov MB
- 8 Aleksandar Ljaftov OS
- 11 Filip Despotovski S
- 12 Filip Nikolovski L
- 15 Filip Madjunkov MB
- 16 Stojan Iliev OS
- 17 Luka Kostikj OS
- 18 Vase Mihailov OS
- 19 Risto Nikolov MB
- 20 Filip Savovski MB

=== Russia ===
The following is Russia roster in the 2021 European Championship.

- Head coach: Tuomas Sammelvuo
- 1 Yaroslav Podlesnykh OS
- 2 Ilia Vlasov MB
- 4 Artem Volvich MB
- 6 Evgeny Baranov L
- 7 Dmitry Volkov OS
- 8 Pavel Tetyukhin OS
- 9 Ivan Iakovlev MB
- 11 Pavel Pankov S
- 18 Egor Kliuka OS
- 20 Ilyas Kurkaev MB
- 23 Kirill Klets OP
- 24 Igor Kobzar S
- 25 Fedor Voronkov OS
- 27 Valentin Golubev L

=== Spain ===
The following is Spain roster in the 2021 European Championship.

- Head coach: Ricardo Maldonado
- 1 Augusto Colito OP
- 3 Víctor Rodríguez Pérez OS
- 5 Rubén Lorente S
- 6 Borja Ruiz MB
- 7 Jordi Ramón Ferragut OS
- 9 Alejandro Vigil MB
- 10 Daniel Ruiz Posadas L
- 11 Unai Larrañaga Ledo L
- 13 Andrés Villena OP
- 14 Miguel Ángel Fornés MB
- 15 Francisco Iribarne OS
- 19 Emilio Ferrández Moles OS
- 20 Álvaro Gimeno Rubio OP
- 27 Ángel Trinidad S

=== Turkey ===
The following is Turkey roster in the 2021 European Championship.

- Head coach: Nedim Özbey
- 1 Ramazan Mandiraci OS
- 4 Beytullah Hatipoğlu L
- 5 Baturalp Burak Güngör OS
- 7 Vahit Emre Savaş MB
- 10 Murat Yenipazar S
- 11 Yiğit Gülmezoğlu OS
- 12 Adis Lagumdzija OP
- 13 Oğuzhan Karasu MB
- 16 Oğulcan Yatgın S
- 20 Efe Bayram OS
- 22 Mert Matić MB
- 24 Mirza Lagumdzija OP
- 30 Caner Ergül L
- 77 Bedirhan Bülbül MB

== Pool D ==
=== Croatia ===
The following is Croatia roster in the 2021 European Championship.

- Head coach: Emanuele Zanini
- 1 Tsimafei Zhukouski S
- 2 Bernard Bakonji S
- 3 Dominik Brčić MB
- 4 Tino Hanžić OS
- 5 Tomislav Mitrašinović MB
- 6 Ivan Raič OP
- 7 Marko Sedlaček OS
- 8 Sven Sarčević L
- 9 Sandro Dukić MB
- 10 Filip Šestan OS
- 13 Hrvoje Pervan L
- 16 Leo Andrić OP
- 19 Ivan Zeljković OS
- 20 Kruno Nikačević MB

=== Estonia ===
The following is Estonia roster in the 2021 European Championship.

- Head coach: Cédric Énard
- 2 Renet Vanker S
- 3 Karli Allik OS
- 4 Ardo Kreek MB
- 7 Renee Teppan OP
- 8 Märt Tammearu OS
- 9 Robert Täht OS
- 10 Silver Maar L
- 11 Oliver Venno OP
- 12 Kristo Kollo OS
- 14 Rait Rikberg L
- 16 Robert Viiber S
- 17 Timo Tammemaa MB
- 19 Andri Aganits MB
- 24 Albert Hurt OS

=== France ===
The following is France roster in the 2021 European Championship.

- Head coach: Bernardo Rezende
- 1 Barthélémy Chinenyeze MB
- 2 Jenia Grebennikov L
- 4 Jean Patry OP
- 6 Benjamin Toniutti S
- 9 Earvin N'Gapeth OS
- 11 Antoine Brizard S
- 14 Nicolas Le Goff MB
- 16 Daryl Bultor MB
- 17 Trévor Clévenot OS
- 19 Yacine Louati OS
- 20 Benjamin Diez L
- 21 Théo Faure OS
- 24 Moussé Gueye MB
- 28 François Rebeyrol OS

=== Germany ===
The following is Germany roster in the 2021 European Championship.

- Head coach: Andrea Giani
- 1 Christian Fromm OS
- 2 Johannes Tille S
- 3 Ruben Schott OS
- 5 Moritz Reichert OS
- 6 Denis Kaliberda OS
- 9 György Grozer OP
- 10 Julian Zenger L
- 12 Anton Brehme L
- 14 Moritz Karlitzek OS
- 17 Jan Zimmermann S
- 18 Florian Krage MB
- 20 Linus Weber OP
- 21 Tobias Krick MB
- 23 Yannick Goralek MB

=== Latvia ===
The following is Latvia roster in the 2021 European Championship.

- Head coach: Avo Keel
- 1 Ingars Ivanovs L
- 4 Toms Svans MB
- 7 Romāns Saušs OS
- 8 Kristaps Šmits OS
- 9 Hermans Egleskalns OP
- 11 Deniss Petrovs S
- 12 Edvarts Buivids OS
- 13 Edvīns Skrūders S
- 14 Gustavs Freimanis MB
- 15 Artems Petrovs L
- 16 Kristaps Platačs OP
- 17 Atvars Ozoliņš OS
- 19 Kristers Dardzans OP
- 22 Renārs Pauls Jansons MB

=== Slovakia ===
The following is Slovakia roster in the 2021 European Championship.

- Head coach: Marek Kardoš
- 1 Peter Michalovič OP
- 2 Tomáš Kriško OS
- 5 Luboš Němec L
- 6 Filip Palgut S
- 7 Michal Zeman MB
- 8 Peter Ondrovič MB
- 9 Patrik Pokopec OS
- 10 Filip Mačuha MB
- 11 Martin Turis L
- 12 Matej Paták OS
- 14 Šimon Krajčovič MB
- 19 Filip Gavenda OP
- 22 Julius Firkal OS
- 24 Samuel Goč S

== See also ==
- 2021 Women's European Volleyball Championship squads
