= 2016 FIVB Volleyball World League =

Volleyball competition held in Poland

2016 World League
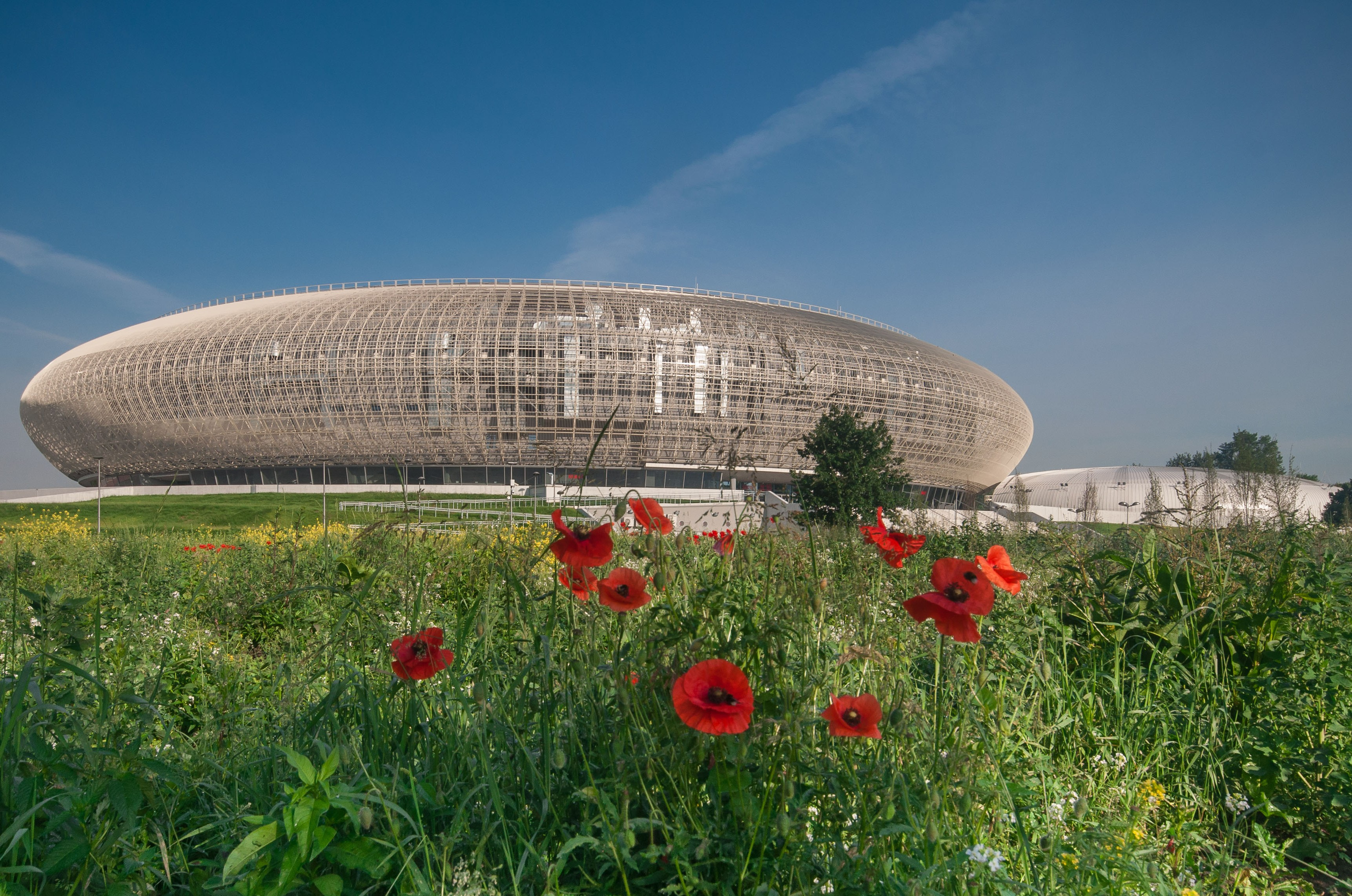
- The Tauron Arena hosted the final

Tournament details
- Host country: Poland
- City: Kraków (Group 1 Final)
- Dates: 16 June – 17 July
- Teams: 36 (from 5 confederations)
- Venues: 27 (in 27 host cities)

Final positions
- Champions: Serbia (1st title)
- Runners-up: Brazil
- Third place: France
- Fourth place: Italy

Tournament awards
- MVP: (Serbia) Marko Ivović
- Best Setter: (Italy) Simone Giannelli
- Best OH: (Serbia) Marko Ivović (France) Antonin Rouzier
- Best MB: (Brazil) Maurício Souza (Serbia) Srećko Lisinac
- Best OPP: (Brazil) Wallace de Souza
- Best Libero: (France) Jenia Grebennikov

Tournament statistics
- Matches played: 162
- Best scorer: (Bulgaria) Sokolov (155 points)
- Best spiker: (Brazil) Wallace (55.90%)
- Best blocker: (Belgium) VD Voorde (0.74)
- Best server: (Brazil) Lucarelli (0.52)
- Best setter: (France) Toniutti (9.06)
- Best digger: (France) Grebennikov (3.03)
- Best receiver: (Poland) Buszek (59.47%)

The 2016 FIVB Volleyball World League was the 27th edition of the annual men's international volleyball tournament which was played by a record 36 teams from 16 June to 17 July 2016. The Group 1 final round was held in Kraków, Poland. After being runners-up on five occasions, Serbia finally claimed their first World League after prevailing over Brazil in straight sets. The defending champions France claimed their first ever bronze medal at the World League after a victory in straight sets against Italy. Marko Ivović was elected the most valuable player.

Canada secured their promotion into the 2017 World League Group 1 by defeating hosts Portugal in straight sets in the Group 2 final four held in Matosinhos.

In the Group 3 final four, held in Frankfurt, Germany, Slovenia defeated the home team in four sets to crown their first ever World League appearance. Additionally, the team coached by former World League champion and MVP Andrea Giani earned a spot for the Intercontinental Group 2 in the next year.

== Qualification ==
- All 32 teams from the 2015 edition directly qualified.
- Slovenia qualified through the 2015 European League.
- Chinese Taipei, Germany and Qatar were invited to participate in Group 3.

Africa	Asia and Oceania	Europe	North America	South America
Egypt; Tunisia	Australia; China; Chinese Taipei^{1} Iran; Japan; Kazakhstan; Qatar^{1} South Korea	Belgium; Bulgaria; Czech Republic; Finland; France; Germany; Greece; Italy; Montenegro Netherlands; Poland; Portugal; Russia; Serbia; Slovakia; Slovenia^{1} Spain; Turkey	Canada; Cuba; Mexico; Puerto Rico; United States	Argentina; Brazil; Venezuela

^{1} Teams making their debuts.

== Format ==
=== Intercontinental round ===
- Group 1, the 12 teams were drawn in 9 pools of 4 teams. In each pool, all teams will compete in round robin format. The results of all 9 pools will combine in 1 ranking table. The hosts and the top five ranked teams will play in the final round. The last ranked team after the Intercontinental Round could be relegated if the winners of the Group 2 Final Round can meet the promotion requirements set by the FIVB.
- Group 2, the 12 teams were drawn in 9 pools of 4 teams. In each pool, all teams will compete in round robin format. The results of all 9 pools will combine in 1 ranking table. The hosts and the top three ranked teams will play in the final round. The last ranked team after the Intercontinental Round could be relegated if the winners of the Group 3 Final Round can meet the promotion requirements set by the FIVB.
- Group 3, the 12 teams were drawn in 6 pools of 4 teams. In each pool, all teams will compete in round robin format. The results of all 6 pools will combine in 1 ranking table. The hosts and the top three ranked teams will play in the final round.

=== Final round ===
- Group 1, the 6 teams in the final round will be divided in 2 pools determined by the serpentine system. The host team will be at the top position and the other teams will be allocated by their rankings in the preliminary round. The top 2 teams from each pool will play in the semifinals. The winning teams will play in the final match for the gold medals.
- Group 2 and Group 3, the host team will face the last ranked team among the qualified teams in the semifinals. The other 2 teams will play against each other in the other semifinal. The winning teams will play in the final match for the gold medals and a chance for promotion.

== Pools composition ==
The pools of Group 1 and Group 2 were announced on 18 August 2015. The pools of Group 3 were announced on 29 October 2015.

=== Group 1 ===
Week 1
Pool A1 Australia	Pool B1 Brazil	Pool C1 Russia
France; Italy; Australia; Belgium	United States; Brazil; Iran; Argentina	Serbia; Bulgaria; Russia; Poland
Week 2
Pool D1 Poland	Pool E1 Italy	Pool F1 Serbia
France; Poland; Argentina; Russia	United States; Australia; Italy; Belgium	Serbia; Bulgaria; Brazil; Iran
Week 3
Pool G1 France	Pool H1 United States	Pool I1 Iran
France; Brazil; Belgium; Poland	United States; Bulgaria; Australia; Russia	Serbia; Italy; Iran; Argentina

=== Group 2 ===
Week 1
Pool A2 Turkey	Pool B2 Japan	Pool C2 Czech Republic
Netherlands; Portugal; Turkey; Slovakia	Japan; South Korea; Finland; Cuba	Canada; China; Egypt; Czech Republic
Week 2
Pool D2 Slovakia	Pool E2 Egypt	Pool F2 Canada
Netherlands; Czech Republic; Cuba; Slovakia	Japan; Turkey; Finland; Egypt	Canada; China; South Korea; Portugal
Week 3
Pool G2 South Korea	Pool H2 China	Pool I2 Finland
Netherlands; South Korea; Egypt; Czech Republic	Japan; China; Turkey; Slovakia	Canada; Portugal; Finland; Cuba

=== Group 3 ===
Week 1
Pool A3 Slovenia	Pool B3 Mexico	Pool C3 Greece
Slovenia; Tunisia; Venezuela; Qatar	Mexico; Spain; Montenegro; Germany	Kazakhstan; Greece; Chinese Taipei; Puerto Rico
Week 2
Pool D3 Greece	Pool E3 Tunisia	Pool F3 Kazakhstan
Slovenia; Puerto Rico; Greece; Qatar	Mexico; Venezuela; Montenegro; Tunisia	Kazakhstan; Germany; Spain; Chinese Taipei

=== Final round ===
Week 5
Group 1 Poland
Pool J1; Poland; Serbia; France Pool K1; Brazil; United States; Italy
Week 4	Week 3
Group 2 Portugal	Group 3 Germany
Portugal; Canada; Turkey; Netherlands	Germany; Slovenia; Greece; Chinese Taipei

== Competition schedule ==
●	Intercontinental round	●	Final round

	Week 1 16–19 Jun	Week 2 23–26 Jun	Week 3 1–3 Jul	Week 4 9–10 Jul	Week 5 13–17 Jul
Group 1	18 matches	18 matches	18 matches		10 matches
Group 2	18 matches	18 matches	18 matches	4 matches	
Group 3	18 matches	18 matches	4 matches		

== Squads ==
There are 21 players in team rosters. Maximum of 12 regular players and maximum of 2 liberos can be selected to play in each week. The full rosters of 21 players of each team can be seen in the article below.

== Pool standing procedure ==
1. Number of matches won
2. Match points
3. Sets ratio
4. Points ratio
5. If the tie continues as per the point ratio between two teams, the priority will be given to the team which won the last match between them. When the tie in points ratio is between three or more teams, a new classification of these teams in the terms of points 1, 2 and 3 will be made taking into consideration only the matches in which they were opposed to each other.

Match won 3–0 or 3–1: 3 match points for the winner, 0 match points for the loser
Match won 3–2: 2 match points for the winner, 1 match point for the loser

== Intercontinental round ==
=== Group 1 ===
==== Ranking ====
Pos	Team	Pld	W	L	Pts	SW	SL	SR	SPW	SPL	SPR	Qualification
1	Brazil	9	8	1	23	25	8	3.125	793	681	1.164	Group 1 Final round
2	United States	9	8	1	23	25	9	2.778	814	748	1.088	Group 1 Final round
3	Serbia	9	7	2	21	23	11	2.091	810	738	1.098	Group 1 Final round
4	France	9	6	3	20	23	10	2.300	806	735	1.097	Group 1 Final round
5	Italy	9	6	3	19	20	10	2.000	715	654	1.093	Group 1 Final round
6	Russia	9	5	4	15	15	14	1.071	698	662	1.054	
7	Iran	9	4	5	9	15	22	0.682	777	861	0.902	
8	Belgium	9	3	6	11	15	20	0.750	760	779	0.976	
9	Argentina	9	3	6	10	16	20	0.800	824	835	0.987	
10	Poland (Note: Qualified as hosts) (H)	9	3	6	8	11	22	0.500	755	815	0.926	Group 1 Final round
11	Bulgaria	9	1	8	2	8	26	0.308	706	810	0.872	
12	Australia	9	0	9	1	3	27	0.111	600	740	0.811	Relegated position

(H) Host

==== Week 1 ====
===== Pool A1 =====
- Venue: Sydney Olympic Park Sports Centre, Sydney, Australia
- All times are Australian Eastern Standard Time (UTC+10:00).

Date	Time		Score		Set 1	Set 2	Set 3	Set 4	Set 5	Total	Report
17 Jun	18:10	France	3–0	Italy	25–23	25–22	25–18			75–63	P2 P3
17 Jun	20:40	Australia	0–3	Belgium	27–29	18–25	22–25			67–79	P2 P3
18 Jun	17:40	Belgium	0–3	Italy	15–25	23–25	21–25			59–75	P2 P3
18 Jun	20:10	Australia	0–3	France	14–25	18–25	21–25			53–75	P2 P3
19 Jun	12:40	Belgium	3–2	France	13–25	26–24	21–25	25–18	15–12	100–104	P2 P3
19 Jun	15:10	Australia	0–3	Italy	23–25	23–25	20–25			66–75	P2 P3

===== Pool B1 =====
- Venue: Carioca Arena 1, Rio de Janeiro, Brazil
- All times are Brasília Time (UTC−03:00).

Date	Time		Score		Set 1	Set 2	Set 3	Set 4	Set 5	Total	Report
16 Jun	14:10	Brazil	3–0	Iran	25–19	25–16	28–26			78–61	P2 P3
16 Jun	17:15	Argentina	1–3	United States	24–26	23–25	25–22	22–25		94–98	P2 P3
17 Jun	14:10	Brazil	3–0	Argentina	25–21	25–13	26–24			76–58	P2 P3
17 Jun	17:15	United States	3–1	Iran	23–25	25–13	27–25	26–24		101–87	P2 P3
18 Jun	20:30	Iran	3–2	Argentina	25–22	25–20	21–25	13–25	15–11	99–103	P2 P3
18 Jun	23:21	Brazil	3–1	United States	25–19	25–15	22–25	25–22		97–81	P2 P3

===== Pool C1 =====
- Venue: Yantarny Sports Complex, Kaliningrad, Russia
- All times are Kaliningrad Time (UTC+02:00).

Date	Time		Score		Set 1	Set 2	Set 3	Set 4	Set 5	Total	Report
17 Jun	16:40	Bulgaria	1–3	Poland	25–19	19–25	17–25	20–25		81–94	P2 P3
17 Jun	19:10	Russia	0–3	Serbia	22–25	32–34	17–25			71–84	P2 P3
18 Jun	16:40	Bulgaria	0–3	Serbia	26–28	25–27	18–25			69–80	P2 P3
18 Jun	19:10	Russia	3–0	Poland	25–22	25–19	25–22			75–63	P2 P3
19 Jun	16:40	Serbia	3–0	Poland	25–20	25–20	25–23			75–63	P2 P3
19 Jun	19:10	Russia	3–1	Bulgaria	20–25	25–18	25–17	25–22		95–82	P2 P3

==== Week 2 ====
===== Pool D1 =====
- Venue: Atlas Arena, Łódź, Poland
- All times are Central European Summer Time (UTC+02:00).

Date	Time		Score		Set 1	Set 2	Set 3	Set 4	Set 5	Total	Report
24 Jun	17:10	Russia	0–3	France	22–25	34–36	20–25			76–86	P2 P3
24 Jun	20:10	Poland	3–1	Argentina	26–24	31–29	36–38	25–22		118–113	P2 P3
25 Jun	17:10	France	2–3	Argentina	25–19	21–25	23–25	27–25	13–15	109–109	P2 P3
25 Jun	20:10	Poland	1–3	Russia	17–25	20–25	25–20	15–25		77–95	P2 P3
26 Jun	17:10	Argentina	3–0	Russia	25–18	25–20	28–26			78–64	P2 P3
26 Jun	20:10	Poland	0–3	France	28–30	20–25	29–31			77–86	P2 P3

===== Pool E1 =====
- Venue: PalaLottomatica, Rome, Italy
- All times are Central European Summer Time (UTC+02:00).

Date	Time		Score		Set 1	Set 2	Set 3	Set 4	Set 5	Total	Report
24 Jun	17:00	Belgium	2–3	United States	25–17	20–25	21–25	25–21	10–15	101–103	P2 P3
24 Jun	20:10	Australia	0–3	Italy	15–25	27–29	17–25			59–79	P2 P3
25 Jun	17:00	United States	3–1	Australia	20–25	25–17	25–23	25–20		95–85	P2 P3
25 Jun	20:00	Italy	3–0	Belgium	25–20	25–17	31–29			81–66	P2 P3
26 Jun	15:30	Australia	0–3	Belgium	21–25	22–25	17–25			60–75	P2 P3
26 Jun	18:30	United States	3–0	Italy	25–22	25–23	25–23			75–68	P2 P3

===== Pool F1 =====
- Venue: Hall Aleksandar Nikolić, Belgrade, Serbia
- All times are Central European Summer Time (UTC+02:00).

Date	Time		Score		Set 1	Set 2	Set 3	Set 4	Set 5	Total	Report
23 Jun	16:00	Iran	3–1	Bulgaria	18–25	25–20	25–23	25–20		93–88	P2 P3
23 Jun	19:00	Brazil	1–3	Serbia	25–19	15–25	21–25	22–25		83–94	P2 P3
24 Jun	16:00	Brazil	3–1	Iran	25–18	24–26	25–16	25–17		99–77	P2 P3
24 Jun	19:00	Serbia	3–1	Bulgaria	25–18	21–25	25–19	25–23		96–85	P2 P3
25 Jun	16:00	Bulgaria	0–3	Brazil	14–25	21–25	12–25			47–75	P2 P3
25 Jun	19:00	Iran	1–3	Serbia	19–25	26–24	18–25	21–25		84–99	P2 P3

==== Week 3 ====
===== Pool G1 =====
- Venue: Palais des Sports Jean Weille, Nancy, France
- All times are Central European Summer Time (UTC+02:00).

Date	Time		Score		Set 1	Set 2	Set 3	Set 4	Set 5	Total	Report
1 Jul	15:00	Brazil	3–0	Poland	30–28	25–21	25–16			80–65	P2 P3
1 Jul	18:00	France	3–0	Belgium	25–19	28–26	25–20			78–65	P2 P3
2 Jul	15:00	Brazil	3–2	Belgium	20–25	25–23	22–25	25–23	15–11	107–107	P2 P3
2 Jul	18:00	France	3–1	Poland	22–25	30–28	25–22	25–19		102–94	P2 P3
3 Jul	15:00	Belgium	2–3	Poland	25–19	23–25	22–25	25–20	13–15	108–104	P2 P3
3 Jul	18:00	France	1–3	Brazil	21–25	24–26	25–22	21–25		91–98	P2 P3

===== Pool H1 =====
- Venue: Kay Bailey Hutchison Convention Center, Dallas, United States
- All times are Central Daylight Time (UTC−05:00).

Date	Time		Score		Set 1	Set 2	Set 3	Set 4	Set 5	Total	Report
1 Jul	17:30	Australia	0–3	Russia	19–25	24–26	12–25			55–76	P2 P3
1 Jul	19:30	United States	3–1	Bulgaria	23–25	25–21	27–25	25–21		100–92	P2 P3
2 Jul	17:30	Bulgaria	0–3	Russia	20–25	14–25	18–25			52–75	P2 P3
2 Jul	19:30	United States	3–0	Australia	25–14	26–24	25–15			76–53	P2 P3
3 Jul	12:37	United States	3–0	Russia	35–33	25–17	25–21			85–71	P2 P3
3 Jul	15:00	Bulgaria	3–2	Australia	25–20	21–25	25–18	23–25	16–14	110–102	P2 P3

===== Pool I1 =====
- Venue: Azadi Indoor Stadium, Tehran, Iran
- All times are Iran Daylight Time (UTC+04:30).

Date	Time		Score		Set 1	Set 2	Set 3	Set 4	Set 5	Total	Report
1 Jul	18:00	Italy	3–1	Argentina	25–18	25–20	22–25	25–22		97–85	P2 P3
1 Jul	21:00	Iran	3–2	Serbia	18–25	22–25	25–22	25–23	16–14	106–109	P2 P3
2 Jul	18:00	Serbia	0–3	Argentina	23–25	22–25	20–25			65–75	P2 P3
2 Jul	21:00	Iran	0–3	Italy	20–25	20–25	21–25			61–75	P2 P3
3 Jul	18:00	Italy	2–3	Serbia	19–25	18–25	25–19	25–22	15–17	102–108	P2 P3
3 Jul	21:00	Iran	3–2	Argentina	25–23	22–25	21–25	25–22	16–14	109–109	P2 P3

=== Group 2 ===
==== Ranking ====
Pos	Team	Pld	W	L	Pts	SW	SL	SR	SPW	SPL	SPR	Qualification
1	Canada	9	8	1	24	26	7	3.714	787	677	1.162	Group 2 Final round
2	Turkey	9	8	1	21	25	10	2.500	813	756	1.075	Group 2 Final round
3	Netherlands	9	6	3	19	22	15	1.467	839	768	1.092	Group 2 Final round
4	Finland	9	6	3	18	22	16	1.375	858	826	1.039	
5	Czech Republic	9	5	4	13	19	19	1.000	837	850	0.985	
6	China	9	4	5	12	13	17	0.765	681	681	1.000	
7	Egypt	9	4	5	11	15	20	0.750	781	816	0.957	
8	Slovakia	9	3	6	10	15	22	0.682	788	843	0.935	
9	Cuba	9	3	6	9	18	24	0.750	891	917	0.972	
10	South Korea	9	3	6	9	14	22	0.636	804	820	0.980	
11	Japan	9	2	7	9	14	21	0.667	763	803	0.950	Relegated position
12	Portugal (Note: Qualified as hosts) (H)	9	2	7	7	13	23	0.565	758	843	0.899	Group 2 Final round

(H) Host

==== Week 1 ====
===== Pool A2 =====
- Venue: İzmir Atatürk Volleyball Hall, İzmir, Turkey
- All times are Eastern European Summer Time (UTC+03:00).

Date	Time		Score		Set 1	Set 2	Set 3	Set 4	Set 5	Total	Report
17 Jun	14:30	Netherlands	3–1	Slovakia	24–26	25–11	25–23	25–22		99–82	P2 P3
17 Jun	17:30	Turkey	3–1	Portugal	25–22	25–20	28–30	25–19		103–91	P2 P3
18 Jun	14:30	Portugal	0–3	Netherlands	14–25	18–25	17–25			49–75	P2 P3
18 Jun	17:30	Turkey	3–0	Slovakia	27–25	25–23	25–22			77–70	P2 P3
19 Jun	14:30	Portugal	2–3	Slovakia	25–18	25–21	21–25	23–25	17–19	111–108	P2 P3
19 Jun	17:30	Turkey	3–0	Netherlands	25–21	25–20	25–23			75–64	P2 P3

===== Pool B2 =====
- Venue: Osaka Municipal Central Gymnasium, Osaka, Japan
- All times are Japan Standard Time (UTC+09:00).

Date	Time		Score		Set 1	Set 2	Set 3	Set 4	Set 5	Total	Report
17 Jun	16:10	Cuba	3–2	South Korea	33–31	25–18	14–25	22–25	15–6	109–105	P2 P3
17 Jun	19:15	Japan	3–0	Finland	26–24	25–20	25–23			76–67	P2 P3
18 Jun	16:10	Japan	2–3	Cuba	25–27	25–21	25–16	28–30	11–15	114–109	P2 P3
18 Jun	19:15	Finland	3–2	South Korea	25–22	25–20	27–29	19–25	19–17	115–113	P2 P3
19 Jun	16:10	Cuba	1–3	Finland	18–25	25–15	23–25	23–25		89–90	P2 P3
19 Jun	19:15	Japan	3–0	South Korea	25–21	25–17	26–24			76–62	P2 P3

===== Pool C2 =====
- Venue: Budvar Arena, České Budějovice, Czech Republic
- All times are Central European Summer Time (UTC+02:00).

Date	Time		Score		Set 1	Set 2	Set 3	Set 4	Set 5	Total	Report
17 Jun	16:00	Czech Republic	2–3	Egypt	25–21	22–25	20–25	25–22	12–15	104–108	P2 P3
17 Jun	19:00	China	0–3	Canada	18–25	22–25	21–25			61–75	P2 P3
18 Jun	15:10	Canada	3–0	Egypt	25–23	25–19	25–16			75–58	P2 P3
18 Jun	18:10	China	1–3	Czech Republic	25–21	22–25	23–25	17–25		87–96	P2 P3
19 Jun	15:10	Egypt	3–0	China	25–20	28–26	26–24			79–70	P2 P3
19 Jun	18:00	Czech Republic	1–3	Canada	16–25	23–25	26–24	24–26		89–100	P2 P3

==== Week 2 ====
===== Pool D2 =====
- Venue: Aegon Arena, Bratislava, Slovakia
- All times are Central European Summer Time (UTC+02:00).

Date	Time		Score		Set 1	Set 2	Set 3	Set 4	Set 5	Total	Report
23 Jun	17:00	Netherlands	2–3	Czech Republic	21–25	25–19	23–25	25–20	11–15	105–104	P2 P3
23 Jun	20:10	Slovakia	3–1	Cuba	25–19	25–23	22–25	25–22		97–89	P2 P3
24 Jun	17:00	Cuba	2–3	Czech Republic	19–25	21–25	26–24	25–22	11–15	102–111	P2 P3
24 Jun	20:15	Slovakia	1–3	Netherlands	14–25	25–21	14–25	23–25		76–96	P2 P3
25 Jun	17:00	Cuba	2–3	Netherlands	25–23	25–14	23–25	23–25	12–15	108–102	P2 P3
25 Jun	20:10	Czech Republic	3–2	Slovakia	23–25	25–23	19–25	25–18	15–11	107–102	P2 P3

===== Pool E2 =====
- Venue: Cairo Stadium Indoor Hall 2, Cairo, Egypt
- All times are Eastern European Time (UTC+02:00).

Date	Time		Score		Set 1	Set 2	Set 3	Set 4	Set 5	Total	Report
24 Jun	21:00	Turkey	3–2	Japan	20–25	19–25	25–19	25–20	15–10	104–99	P2 P3
25 Jun	00:00	Egypt	0–3	Finland	22–25	17–25	22–25			61–75	P2 P3
25 Jun	21:00	Turkey	3–2	Finland	19–25	21–25	25–21	25–22	15–11	105–104	P2 P3
26 Jun	00:00	Egypt	3–2	Japan	25–22	23–25	21–25	25–21	15–9	109–102	P2 P3
26 Jun	21:00	Finland	3–1	Japan	25–18	31–29	22–25	25–21		103–93	P2 P3
26 Jun	23:40	Egypt	3–1	Turkey	23–25	25–18	25–23	31–29		104–95	P2 P3

===== Pool F2 =====
- Venue: SaskTel Centre, Saskatoon, Canada
- All times are Central Standard Time (UTC−06:00).

Date	Time		Score		Set 1	Set 2	Set 3	Set 4	Set 5	Total	Report
24 Jun	17:40	China	3–1	Portugal	25–18	22–25	25–16	25–20		97–79	P2 P3
24 Jun	20:10	Canada	3–0	South Korea	25–20	25–21	25–20			75–61	P2 P3
25 Jun	13:40	Canada	3–0	China	25–21	25–19	25–17			75–57	P2 P3
25 Jun	16:10	South Korea	0–3	Portugal	23–25	26–28	23–25			72–78	P2 P3
26 Jun	15:35	South Korea	1–3	China	25–18	23–25	17–25	23–25		88–93	P2 P3
26 Jun	18:20	Canada	3–1	Portugal	24–26	25–15	25–23	25–21		99–85	P2 P3

==== Week 3 ====
===== Pool G2 =====
- Venue: Jangchung Arena, Seoul, South Korea
- All times are Korea Standard Time (UTC+09:00).

Date	Time		Score		Set 1	Set 2	Set 3	Set 4	Set 5	Total	Report
1 Jul	16:03	South Korea	3–0	Czech Republic	25–18	25–21	25–20			75–59	P2 P3
1 Jul	18:31	Egypt	1–3	Netherlands	19–25	25–21	18–25	16–25		78–96	P2 P3
2 Jul	14:02	South Korea	3–2	Egypt	26–24	25–20	23–25	28–30	15–13	117–112	P2 P3
2 Jul	17:20	Czech Republic	1–3	Netherlands	20–25	26–24	23–25	16–25		85–99	P2 P3
3 Jul	14:00	South Korea	3–2	Netherlands	25–16	22–25	21–25	25–21	18–16	111–103	P2 P3
3 Jul	17:01	Czech Republic	3–0	Egypt	25–19	32–30	25–23			82–72	P2 P3

===== Pool H2 =====
- Venue: Xuancheng Sports Centre, Xuancheng, China
- All times are China Standard Time (UTC+08:00).

Date	Time		Score		Set 1	Set 2	Set 3	Set 4	Set 5	Total	Report
1 Jul	15:00	Turkey	3–0	Japan	25–21	25–20	25–22			75–63	P2 P3
1 Jul	17:00	China	3–0	Slovakia	25–19	25–18	25–22			75–59	P2 P3
2 Jul	15:00	Slovakia	3–1	Japan	25–18	25–21	24–26	25–22		99–87	P2 P3
2 Jul	17:40	China	0–3	Turkey	25–27	23–25	18–25			66–77	P2 P3
3 Jul	15:00	Turkey	3–2	Slovakia	25–13	16–25	21–25	25–22	15–10	102–95	P2 P3
3 Jul	17:45	China	3–0	Japan	25–11	25–22	25–20			75–53	P2 P3

===== Pool I2 =====
- Venue: Tampere Ice Stadium, Tampere, Finland
- All times are Eastern European Summer Time (UTC+03:00).

Date	Time		Score		Set 1	Set 2	Set 3	Set 4	Set 5	Total	Report
1 Jul	15:40	Canada	3–2	Cuba	24–26	25–21	19–25	25–16	15–13	108–101	P2 P3
1 Jul	18:40	Finland	2–3	Portugal	25–22	21–25	25–19	24–26	12–15	107–107	P2 P3
2 Jul	15:40	Portugal	0–3	Canada	18–25	22–25	21–25			61–75	P2 P3
2 Jul	18:40	Finland	3–1	Cuba	25–19	25–12	18–25	25–21		93–77	P2 P3
3 Jul	15:10	Cuba	3–2	Portugal	25–19	22–25	25–19	20–25	15–9	107–97	P2 P3
3 Jul	18:10	Finland	3–2	Canada	25–22	18–25	25–20	21–25	15–13	104–105	P2 P3

=== Group 3 ===
==== Ranking ====
Pos	Team	Pld	W	L	Pts	SW	SL	SR	SPW	SPL	SPR	Qualification
1	Slovenia	6	5	1	15	16	5	3.200	513	441	1.163	Group 3 Final round
2	Greece	6	5	1	15	15	6	2.500	516	462	1.117	Group 3 Final round
3	Chinese Taipei	6	4	2	12	13	9	1.444	530	515	1.029	Group 3 Final round
4	Montenegro	6	4	2	12	16	12	1.333	628	599	1.048	
5	Venezuela	6	4	2	10	14	11	1.273	576	557	1.034	
6	Qatar	6	3	3	9	11	10	1.100	477	480	0.994	
7	Spain	6	3	3	9	13	12	1.083	556	552	1.007	
8	Tunisia	6	3	3	8	10	13	0.769	537	549	0.978	
9	Germany (Note: Qualified as hosts) (H)	6	2	4	7	11	13	0.846	534	535	0.998	Group 3 Final round
10	Mexico	6	1	5	5	10	16	0.625	546	590	0.925	
11	Kazakhstan	6	1	5	3	4	15	0.267	423	478	0.885	
12	Puerto Rico	6	1	5	3	4	15	0.267	397	475	0.836	

(H) Host

==== Week 1 ====
===== Pool A3 =====
- Venue: Arena Stožice, Ljubljana, Slovenia
- All times are Central European Summer Time (UTC+02:00).

Date	Time		Score		Set 1	Set 2	Set 3	Set 4	Set 5	Total	Report
17 Jun	16:30	Tunisia	0–3	Venezuela	22–25	26–28	20–25			68–78	P2 P3
17 Jun	20:00	Slovenia	3–1	Qatar	25–15	25–21	18–25	25–18		93–79	P2 P3
18 Jun	16:30	Venezuela	3–1	Qatar	25–27	25–15	27–25	25–23		102–90	P2 P3
18 Jun	20:00	Tunisia	0–3	Slovenia	17–25	20–25	22–25			59–75	P2 P3
19 Jun	15:30	Qatar	3–1	Tunisia	25–22	25–20	23–25	25–20		98–87	P2 P3
19 Jun	19:00	Venezuela	1–3	Slovenia	25–23	22–25	24–26	22–25		93–99	P2 P3

===== Pool B3 =====
- Venue: Gimnasio Olímpico Juan de la Barrera, Mexico City, Mexico
- All times are Central Daylight Time (UTC−05:00).

Date	Time		Score		Set 1	Set 2	Set 3	Set 4	Set 5	Total	Report
17 Jun	18:00	Montenegro	3–2	Germany	22–25	25–22	25–17	21–25	15–11	108–100	P2 P3
17 Jun	21:00	Mexico	2–3	Spain	22–25	26–24	19–25	25–22	12–15	104–111	P2 P3
18 Jun	18:00	Germany	1–3	Spain	20–25	28–26	16–25	17–25		81–101	P2 P3
18 Jun	20:40	Mexico	1–3	Montenegro	19–25	25–21	21–25	23–25		88–96	P2 P3
19 Jun	16:00	Spain	2–3	Montenegro	27–25	23–25	18–25	25–21	13–15	106–111	P2 P3
19 Jun	19:00	Mexico	3–1	Germany	25–21	25–20	15–25	25–17		90–83	P2 P3

===== Pool C3 =====
- Venue: Kozani New Indoor Sports Hall, Kozani, Greece
- All times are Eastern European Summer Time (UTC+03:00).

Date	Time		Score		Set 1	Set 2	Set 3	Set 4	Set 5	Total	Report
17 Jun	18:00	Chinese Taipei	3–0	Puerto Rico	25–20	30–28	25–15			80–63	P2 P3
17 Jun	21:00	Kazakhstan	0–3	Greece	16–25	26–28	18–25			60–78	P2 P3
18 Jun	18:00	Kazakhstan	3–0	Chinese Taipei	25–22	25–23	28–26			78–71	P2 P3
18 Jun	21:00	Greece	3–0	Puerto Rico	25–16	25–22	25–19			75–57	P2 P3
19 Jun	18:00	Puerto Rico	3–0	Kazakhstan	29–27	25–19	25–21			79–67	P2 P3
19 Jun	21:00	Greece	3–1	Chinese Taipei	22–25	25–18	25–21	25–22		97–86	P2 P3

==== Week 2 ====
===== Pool D3 =====
- Venue: Alexandreio Melathron Nick Galis Hall, Thessaloniki, Greece
- All times are Eastern European Summer Time (UTC+03:00).

Date	Time		Score		Set 1	Set 2	Set 3	Set 4	Set 5	Total	Report
24 Jun	18:00	Slovenia	3–0	Qatar	25–21	25–18	25–20			75–59	P2 P3
24 Jun	21:00	Greece	3–1	Puerto Rico	25–17	25–17	27–29	26–24		103–87	P2 P3
25 Jun	18:00	Slovenia	3–0	Puerto Rico	25–16	25–22	25–12			75–50	P2 P3
25 Jun	21:00	Greece	0–3	Qatar	21–25	17–25	24–26			62–76	P2 P3
26 Jun	18:00	Puerto Rico	0–3	Qatar	22–25	23–25	16–25			61–75	P2 P3
26 Jun	21:00	Greece	3–1	Slovenia	25–23	22–25	25–21	29–27		101–96	P2 P3

===== Pool E3 =====
- Venue: El Menzah Sports Palace, Tunis, Tunisia
- All times are West Africa Time (UTC+01:00).

Date	Time		Score		Set 1	Set 2	Set 3	Set 4	Set 5	Total	Report
24 Jun	16:00	Montenegro	2–3	Venezuela	19–25	16–25	25–19	25–15	13–15	98–99	P2 P3
24 Jun	22:00	Tunisia	3–1	Mexico	22–25	25–22	25–17	25–18		97–82	P2 P3
25 Jun	16:00	Mexico	2–3	Venezuela	25–22	18–25	21–25	25–23	10–15	99–110	P2 P3
25 Jun	22:00	Tunisia	3–2	Montenegro	22–25	25–27	31–29	26–24	19–17	123–122	P2 P3
26 Jun	16:00	Mexico	1–3	Montenegro	25–18	17–25	22–25	19–25		83–93	P2 P3
26 Jun	22:00	Tunisia	3–1	Venezuela	28–26	25–27	25–23	25–18		103–94	P2 P3

===== Pool F3 =====
- Venue: Baluan Sholak Sports Palace, Almaty, Kazakhstan
- All times are Almaty Time (UTC+06:00).

Date	Time		Score		Set 1	Set 2	Set 3	Set 4	Set 5	Total	Report
24 Jun	12:10	Spain	1–3	Chinese Taipei	20–25	22–25	26–24	20–25		88–99	P2 P3
24 Jun	15:40	Kazakhstan	0–3	Germany	21–25	19–25	25–27			65–77	P2 P3
25 Jun	12:10	Chinese Taipei	3–1	Germany	25–23	16–25	30–28	25–21		96–97	P2 P3
25 Jun	15:40	Kazakhstan	0–3	Spain	22–25	18–25	21–25			61–75	P2 P3
26 Jun	12:10	Germany	3–1	Spain	25–20	21–25	25–16	25–14		96–75	P2 P3
26 Jun	15:40	Kazakhstan	1–3	Chinese Taipei	25–23	23–25	22–25	22–25		92–98	P2 P3

== Final round ==
=== Group 3 ===
- Venue: Fraport Arena, Frankfurt, Germany
- All times are Central European Summer Time (UTC+02:00).

==== Final four (Week 3) ====
Semifinals
1 July
Germany	3
Chinese Taipei	0
1 July
Slovenia	3
Greece	0

Final
2 July
Germany	1
Slovenia	3
3rd place match
2 July
Chinese Taipei	1
Greece	3

===== Semifinals =====
Date	Time		Score		Set 1	Set 2	Set 3	Set 4	Set 5	Total	Report
1 Jul	17:00	Germany	3–0	Chinese Taipei	25–16	25–19	25–22			75–57	P2 P3
1 Jul	20:10	Slovenia	3–0	Greece	25–22	25–20	25–16			75–58	P2 P3

===== 3rd place match =====
Date	Time		Score		Set 1	Set 2	Set 3	Set 4	Set 5	Total	Report
2 Jul	14:00	Chinese Taipei	1–3	Greece	19–25	25–22	25–27	18–25		87–99	P2 P3

===== Final =====
Date	Time		Score		Set 1	Set 2	Set 3	Set 4	Set 5	Total	Report
2 Jul	17:10	Germany	1–3	Slovenia	19–25	18–25	25–21	20–25		82–96	P2 P3

=== Group 2 ===
- Venue: Centro de Desportos e Congressos de Matosinhos, Matosinhos, Portugal
- All times are Western European Summer Time (UTC+01:00).

==== Final four (Week 4) ====
Semifinals
9 July
Canada	3
Turkey	0
9 July
Portugal	3
Netherlands	1

Final
10 July
Canada	3
Portugal	0
3rd place match
10 July
Turkey	1
Netherlands	3

===== Semifinals =====
Date	Time		Score		Set 1	Set 2	Set 3	Set 4	Set 5	Total	Report
9 Jul	16:00	Canada	3–0	Turkey	26–24	25–17	25–23			76–64	P2 P3
9 Jul	19:00	Portugal	3–1	Netherlands	25–22	26–24	17–25	29–27		97–98	P2 P3

===== 3rd place match =====
Date	Time		Score		Set 1	Set 2	Set 3	Set 4	Set 5	Total	Report
10 Jul	15:00	Turkey	1–3	Netherlands	23–25	30–28	22–25	22–25		97–103	P2 P3

===== Final =====
Date	Time		Score		Set 1	Set 2	Set 3	Set 4	Set 5	Total	Report
10 Jul	18:00	Canada	3–0	Portugal	25–19	25–22	25–15			75–56	P2 P3

=== Group 1 ===
- Venue: Tauron Arena, Kraków, Poland
- All times are Central European Summer Time (UTC+02:00).

==== Pool play (Week 5) ====
===== Pool J1 =====
Pos	Team	Pld	W	L	Pts	SW	SL	SR	SPW	SPL	SPR	Qualification
1	Serbia	2	1	1	4	5	4	1.250	195	194	1.005	Semifinals
2	France	2	1	1	3	5	5	1.000	213	208	1.024	Semifinals
3	Poland	2	1	1	2	4	5	0.800	192	198	0.970	

Date	Time		Score		Set 1	Set 2	Set 3	Set 4	Set 5	Total	Report
13 Jul	20:30	Poland	3–2	France	21–25	17–25	25–17	28–26	15–12	106–105	P2 P3
14 Jul	20:30	Poland	1–3	Serbia	23–25	20–25	25–18	18–25		86–93	P2 P3
15 Jul	17:30	Serbia	2–3	France	20–25	19–25	26–24	25–19	12–15	102–108	P2 P3

===== Pool K1 =====
Pos	Team	Pld	W	L	Pts	SW	SL	SR	SPW	SPL	SPR	Qualification
1	Brazil	2	2	0	5	6	2	3.000	188	167	1.126	Semifinals
2	Italy	2	1	1	3	3	4	0.750	160	171	0.936	Semifinals
3	United States	2	0	2	1	3	6	0.500	206	216	0.954	

Date	Time		Score		Set 1	Set 2	Set 3	Set 4	Set 5	Total	Report
13 Jul	17:30	Brazil	3–0	Italy	25–18	25–20	25–19			75–57	P2 P3
14 Jul	17:30	United States	1–3	Italy	22–25	25–27	28–26	21–25		96–103	P2 P3
15 Jul	20:30	Brazil	3–2	United States	24–26	21–25	28–26	25–21	15–12	113–110	P2 P3

==== Final four (Week 5) ====
Semifinals
16 July
Serbia	3
Italy	2
16 July
France	1
Brazil	3

Final
17 July
Serbia	3
Brazil	0
3rd place match
17 July
Italy	0
France	3

===== Semifinals =====
Date	Time		Score		Set 1	Set 2	Set 3	Set 4	Set 5	Total	Report
16 Jul	17:30	Serbia	3–2	Italy	23–25	25–21	25–23	18–25	15–11	106–105	P2 P3
16 Jul	20:45	France	1–3	Brazil	16–25	25–23	26–28	31–33		98–109	P2 P3

===== 3rd place match =====
Date	Time		Score		Set 1	Set 2	Set 3	Set 4	Set 5	Total	Report
17 Jul	17:30	Italy	0–3	France	23–25	21–25	20–25			64–75	P2 P3

===== Final =====
Date	Time		Score		Set 1	Set 2	Set 3	Set 4	Set 5	Total	Report
17 Jul	20:30	Serbia	3–0	Brazil	25–22	25–22	25–21			75–65	P2 P3

== Final standing ==
Rank	Team
1st place, gold medalist(s)	Serbia
2nd place, silver medalist(s)	Brazil
3rd place, bronze medalist(s)	France
4	Italy
5	Poland
5	United States
7	Russia
8	Iran
9	Belgium
10	Argentina
11	Bulgaria
12	Australia
13	Canada
14	Portugal
15	Netherlands
16	Turkey
17	Finland
18	Czech Republic
19	China
20	Egypt
21	Slovakia
22	Cuba
23	South Korea
24	Japan
25	Slovenia
26	Germany
27	Greece
28	Chinese Taipei
29	Montenegro
30	Venezuela
31	Qatar
32	Spain
33	Tunisia
34	Mexico
35	Kazakhstan
36	Puerto Rico

2016 World League champions

Serbia
1st title

14-man Roster for Group 1 Final Round
Aleksandar Okolić, Uroš Kovačević, Milan Katić, Aleksa Brđović, Dragan Stanković (c), Marko Ivović, Nikola Jovović, Miloš Nikić, Tomislav Dokić, Dražen Luburić, Neven Majstorović, Marko Podraščanin, Nikola Rosić, Srećko Lisinac
Head coach
Nikola Grbić

== Awards ==
- Most valuable player
  (Serbia) Marko Ivović
- Best setter
  (Italy) Simone Giannelli
- Best outside spikers
  (Serbia) Marko Ivović
  (France) Antonin Rouzier
- Best middle blockers
  (Brazil) Maurício Souza
  (Serbia) Srećko Lisinac
- Best opposite spiker
  (Brazil) Wallace de Souza
- Best libero
  (France) Jenia Grebennikov

== Statistics leaders ==
The statistics of each group follows the vis reports P2 and P3. The statistics include 6 volleyball skills; serve, reception, set, spike, block, and dig. The table below shows the top 5 ranked players in each skill by group plus top scorers as of 10 July 2016.

=== Best scorers ===
Best scorers determined by scored points from spike, block and serve.

	Group 1		Group 2		Group 3	
Rank	Name	Points	Name	Points	Name	Points
1	(Bulgaria) Tsvetan Sokolov	155	(Egypt) Ahmed Elkotb	188	(Montenegro) Marko Bojić	125
2	(Belgium) Gert Van Walle	153	(Netherlands) Wouter Ter Maat	178	(Venezuela) Kervin Piñerua	116
3	(Brazil) Wallace de Souza	130	(Finland) Olli-Pekka Ojansivu	171	(Slovenia) Mitja Gasparini	113
4	(Brazil) Ricardo Lucarelli Souza	124	(Portugal) Alexandre Ferreira	164	(Chinese Taipei) Chen Chien-chen	100
5	(Italy) Luca Vettori	123	(Japan) Kunihiro Shimizu	158	(Greece) Rafail Koumentakis	99

=== Best spikers ===
Best spikers determined by successful spikes in percentage.

	Group 1		Group 2		Group 3	
Rank	Name	%	Name	%	Name	%
1	(Brazil) Wallace de Souza	55.90	(Turkey) Baturalp Burak Güngör	56.95	(Puerto Rico) Steven Morales	55.70
2	(Serbia) Uroš Kovačević	55.56	(Czech Republic) Michal Finger	53.95	(Greece) Rafail Koumentakis	55.06
3	(Brazil) Ricardo Lucarelli Souza	54.59	(Netherlands) Maarten van Garderen	52.97	(Greece) Andreas-Dimitrios Frangos	54.97
4	(France) Earvin N'Gapeth	53.15	(Canada) John Gordon Perrin	52.50	(Chinese Taipei) Wang Ming-chun	54.48
5	(France) Antonin Rouzier	52.63	(Portugal) Alexandre Ferreira	51.59	(Spain) Andrés Villena	53.01

=== Best blockers ===
Best blockers determined by the average of stuff blocks per set.

	Group 1		Group 2		Group 3	
Rank	Name	Avg	Name	Avg	Name	Avg
1	(Belgium) Simon Van De Voorde	0.74	(Netherlands) Jasper Diefenbach	0.82	(Montenegro) Gojko Ćuk	1.07
2	(Argentina) Sebastián Solé	0.69	(Finland) Tommi Siirilä	0.76	(Tunisia) Omar Agrebi	1.00
3	(Russia) Dmitry Musersky	0.69	(China) Chen Longhai	0.60	(Qatar) Ibrahim Ibrahim	0.86
4	(Iran) Mohammad Mousavi	0.68	(Canada) Graham Vigrass	0.54	(Mexico) Tomás Aguilera	0.77
5	(Serbia) Srećko Lisinac	0.59	(Netherlands) Thomas Koelewijn	0.53	(Venezuela) Jonathan Quijada	0.72

=== Best servers ===
Best servers determined by the average of aces per set.

	Group 1		Group 2		Group 3	
Rank	Name	Avg	Name	Avg	Name	Avg
1	(Brazil) Ricardo Lucarelli Souza	0.52	(Finland) Olli-Pekka Ojansivu	0.55	(Slovenia) Mitja Gasparini	0.71
2	(Serbia) Srećko Lisinac	0.47	(Egypt) Hossam Abdalla	0.51	(Montenegro) Marko Bojić	0.46
3	(Italy) Simone Giannelli	0.43	(Czech Republic) Donovan Dzavoronok	0.47	(Venezuela) Kervin Piñerua	0.40
4	(Italy) Ivan Zaytsev	0.40	(South Korea) Seo Jae-duck	0.36	(Slovenia) Klemen Čebulj	0.39
5	(Argentina) Cristian Poglajen	0.39	(Japan) Kunihiro Shimizu	0.34	(Mexico) Pedro Rangel	0.27

=== Best setters ===
Best setters determined by the average of running sets per set.

	Group 1		Group 2		Group 3	
Rank	Name	Avg	Name	Avg	Name	Avg
1	(France) Benjamin Toniutti	9.06	(South Korea) Han Sun-soo	11.97	(Venezuela) José Carrasco	9.08
2	(Poland) Grzegorz Łomacz	8.82	(China) Li Runming	11.53	(Kazakhstan) Sergey Kuznetsov	8.84
3	(Russia) Sergey Grankin	6.90	(Canada) TJ Sanders	9.44	(Tunisia) Khaled Ben Slimene	7.17
4	(Italy) Simone Giannelli	5.93	(Finland) Eemi Tervaportti	8.71	(Chinese Taipei) Huang Pei-hung	6.59
5	(Argentina) Luciano De Cecco	5.83	(Egypt) Hossam Abdalla	6.06	(Tunisia) Mehdi Ben Cheikh	6.39

=== Best diggers ===
Best diggers determined by the average of successful digs per set.

	Group 1		Group 2		Group 3	
Rank	Name	Avg	Name	Avg	Name	Avg
1	(France) Jenia Grebennikov	3.03	(Finland) Lauri Kerminen	2.50	(Montenegro) Nikola Lakčević	2.31
2	(Argentina) Alexis González	2.25	(Egypt) Ahmed Mohamed	1.66	(Tunisia) Tayeb Korbosli	2.09
3	(Australia) Luke Perry	2.23	(Canada) TJ Sanders	1.56	(Tunisia) Ismaïl Moalla	1.78
4	(Poland) Paweł Zatorski	2.18	(Canada) Blair Cameron Bann	1.54	(Mexico) Jesús Rangel	1.65
5	(United States) Erik Shoji	2.12	(China) Tong Jiahua	1.37	(Venezuela) Héctor Mata	1.52

=== Best receivers ===
Best receivers determined by efficient receptions in percentage.

	Group 1		Group 2		Group 3	
Rank	Name	%	Name	%	Name	%
1	(Poland) Rafał Buszek	59.47	(China) Tong Jiahua	66.44	(Venezuela) Héctor Mata	61.03
2	(United States) Taylor Sander	57.96	(South Korea) Jung Ji-seok	65.12	(Tunisia) Mohamed Ali Ben Othmen Miladi	59.35
3	(France) Earvin N'Gapeth	56.29	(Canada) Blair Cameron Bann	64.18	(Chinese Taipei) Lin Yung-shun	59.28
4	(United States) Erik Shoji	56.25	(Canada) John Gordon Perrin	60.81	(Venezuela) Jhonlen Barreto	58.91
5	(France) Jenia Grebennikov	56.10	(Finland) Lauri Kerminen	60.67	(Kazakhstan) Roman Fartov	58.33

== See also ==
- 2016 FIVB Volleyball World Grand Prix
