= Nikola Lakčević =

Nikola Lakčević may refer to:

- Nikola Lakčević (volleyball)
- Nikola Lakčević (footballer)
