= Radovan Cebalović =

Montenegrin volleyball player (born 1988)

Personal information
- Nationality: Montenegro
- Born: 6 September 1988 (age 38)
- Height: 202 cm (6 ft 8 in)
- Weight: 110 kg (243 lb)
- Spike: 325 cm (128 in)
- Block: 320 cm (126 in)

Volleyball information
- Position: Opposite
- Number: 20 (national team)

Career
Years	Teams
2015	(Montenegro) Volley Star Nikšić

National team
2015–present	Montenegro

Radovan Cebalović (born 6 September 1988) is a Montenegrin volleyball player. Native of Nikšić, he began his career in local club Volley Star, where he still plays as of 2017. He played for the Montenegro men's national volleyball team in 2015 and 2016 FIVB World Leagues.
