= Dabović =

Dabović is a surname. Notable people with this surname include:

- Ana Dabović (born 1989), Serbian basketball player
- Dejan Dabović (1944–2020), Yugoslav water polo player
- Milica Dabović (born 1982), Serbian basketball player
- Sevastijan Dabović (1863–1940), Serbian-American monk and missionary
- Simo Dabović (born 1987), Montenegrin volleyball player
