= Slobodan Bojic =

Montenegrin volleyball player (born 1992)

Personal information
- Nationality: Montenegro
- Born: 11 August 1992 (age 34)
- Height: 200 cm (6 ft 7 in)
- Weight: 95 kg (209 lb)
- Spike: 335 cm (132 in)
- Block: 325 cm (128 in)

Volleyball information
- Number: 12 (national team)

Career
Years	Teams
2015	CS Sfaxien
2018	Jiangsu

National team
2015	Montenegro

Slobodan Bojic (born 11 August 1992) is a Montenegrin male volleyball player. He is part of the Montenegro men's national volleyball team. On club level he plays for CS Sfaxien.
