= Nikola Rosić =

Serbian volleyball player (born 1984)

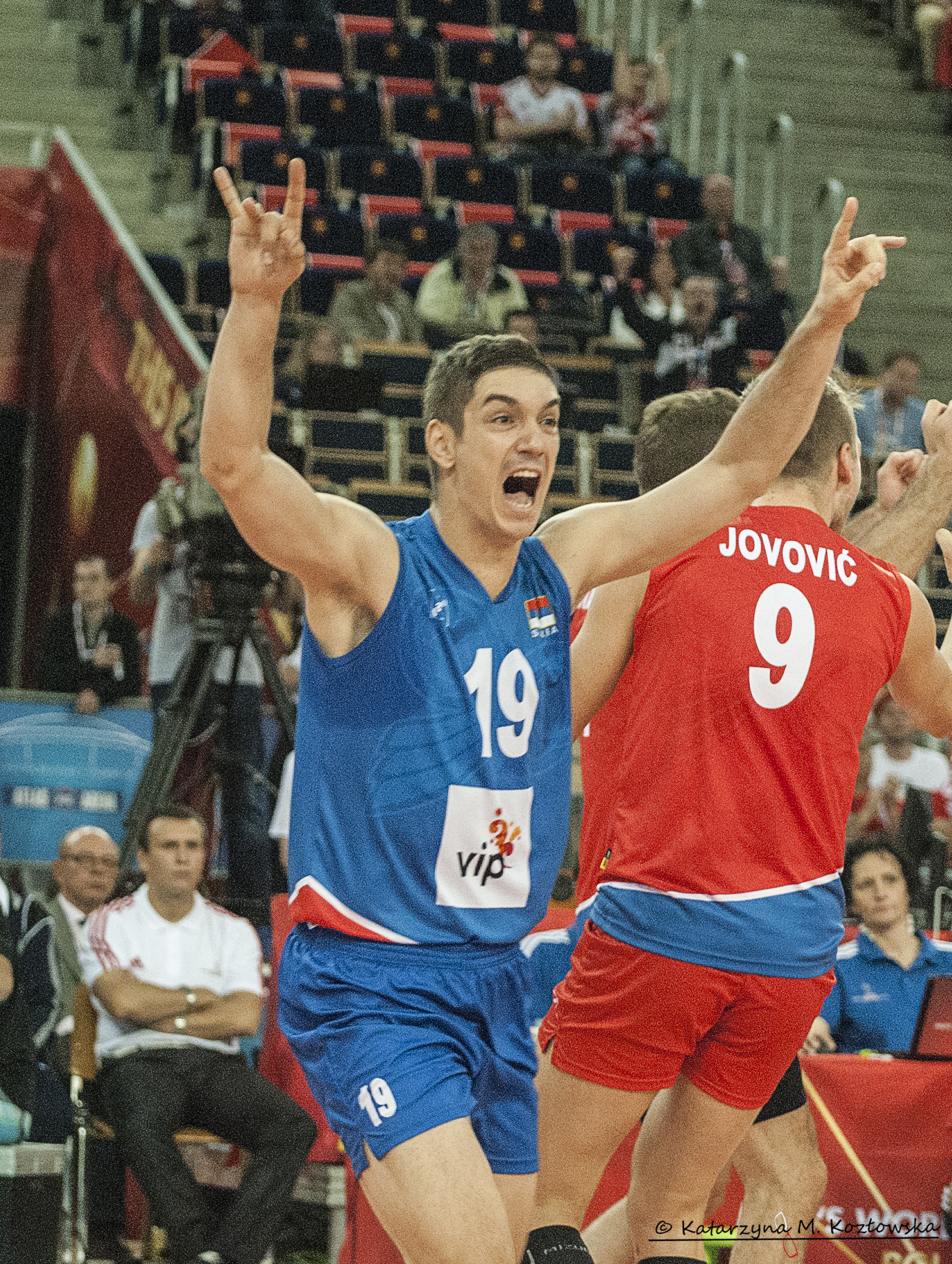
- Rosić playing for Serbia at the 2014 World Championship.

Personal information
- Born: 5 August 1984 (age 42); Belgrade, SR Serbia, SFR Yugoslavia
- Height: 1.92 m (6 ft 4 in)
- Weight: 85 kg (187 lb)
- Spike: 330 cm (130 in)
- Block: 320 cm (126 in)

Volleyball information
- Position: Libero
- Current club: Tomis Constanța
- Number: 17

Career
Years	Teams
1999–2004; 2004–2006; 2006–2009; 2009–2013; 2013–2014; 2014–	OK Partizan; Budvanska Rivijera Budva; Moers Sport Club; VfB Friedrichshafen; PV Lugano; Tomis Constanța

National team
Serbia
Honours
Men's volleyball
Representing Serbia
World Championship
Bronze medal – third place	2010 Italy
European Championship
Gold medal – first place	2011 Austria/Czech Republic
Bronze medal – third place	2013 Denmark/Poland
Bronze medal – third place	2017 Poland
World League
Gold medal – first place	2016 Kraków
Silver medal – second place	2008 Rio de Janeiro
Silver medal – second place	2009 Belgrade
Silver medal – second place	2015 Rio de Janeiro
Bronze medal – third place	2010 Cordoba
Mediterranean Games
Bronze medal – third place	2005 Almería
- Last updated: 3 September 2017

Nikola Rosić (Serbian Cyrillic: Никола Росић, born 5 August 1984) is a Serbian volleyball player, a member of Serbia men's national volleyball team and Romanian club Tomis Constanța, a participant at the Olympic Games London 2012, winner of the European Championship 2011, bronze medalist of the World Championship 2010, and medalist in the World League.

== Career ==
=== National team ===
On 19 July 2015 Serbian national team with him in the squad reached the final of the World League, but they lost to France 0–3 and won silver medal.

== Sporting achievements ==
=== Clubs ===
==== National championships ====
- 2009/2010 German Championship, with VfB Friedrichshafen
- 2010/2011 German Championship, with VfB Friedrichshafen
- 2011/2012 German Cup 2012, with VfB Friedrichshafen
- 2011/2012 German Championship, with VfB Friedrichshafen
- 2012/2013 German Championship, with VfB Friedrichshafen
- 2013/2014 Swiss Championship, with PV Lugano
- 2014/2015 Romanian Championship, with Tomis Constanța

=== National team ===
- 2005 Mediterranean Games
- 2008 FIVB World League
- 2009 FIVB World League
- 2010 FIVB World League
- 2010 FIVB World Championship
- 2011 CEV European Championship
- 2013 CEV European Championship
- 2015 FIVB World League
- 2016 FIVB World League
- 2017 CEV European Championship
