= Balša Radunović (volleyball) =

Montenegrin volleyball player (born 1992)

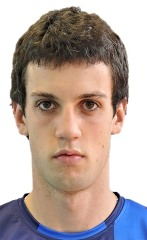
- Image of Balsa Radunovic

Personal information
- Nationality: Montenegro
- Born: 12 August 1992 (age 34); Cetinje, Montenegro
- Hometown: Budva, Montenegro
- Height: 205 cm (6 ft 9 in)
- Weight: 94 kg (207 lb)
- Spike: 350 cm (138 in)
- Block: 330 cm (130 in)

Volleyball information
- Position: Outside hitter (OH)
- Current club: OK Budva, Montenegro
- Number: 6

Career
Years	Teams
2007-2011; 2011-2012; 2012-2013; 2013-2014; 2014-2015; 2014-2015; 2015-2016; 2016-2019; 2019-2020; 2020-2021; 2021-2022; 2022-2023; 2023-2024	Budvanska Rivijera, Montenegro; Segrate Milano, Italy; Ravenna, Italy; Panaxaikh, Greece; AEK-Athens, Greece; Darkulaib, Bahrain; Al-Hilal, Riyadh, Saudi Arabia; CV Teruel, Spain (Super League); Lamongan Sadang MHS, Indonesia; Yeni Kızıltepe Spor Kulubü, Turkey; CSA Steaua Bucuresti, Romania; Melilla Sport Capital, Spain; OK Budva, Montenegro

National team
Montenegro

Balša Radunović (born 12 August 1992) is a Montenegrin volleyball player and a member of Montenegro men's national volleyball team. He is currently playing in the Montenegrin EPCG Superliga for OK Budva. In 2016, he won the Super Cup with CV Teruel and placed 2nd place in the King’s Cup - Spanish Super League, while being the best scorer in the final match.

== Professional career ==
Achievements

- 2008 - 2011: Won Championship of Montenegro 3 times and won Cups 2 times
- 2011: Champions league knockout phase with Budvanska Rivijera
- 2012: Final Cup of Italy and Final of Championship with Segrate, Italy
- 2014: Won Gold Medal in EuroLeague with National Team of Montenegro
- 2015: Final 4 of Arab Champions League with Darkulaib, Bahrain
- 2015: 2nd place in World League with National Team of Montenegro
- 2016: Won Championship of Saudi Arabia – Al Hilal Saudi Arabia
- 2017: Won Super Cup of Spanish Super League – CAI Teruel
- 2017: 2nd place in King’s Cup (best scorer in final match) – Spanish Super League, CAI Teruel
