= Mitja Gasparini =

Slovenian volleyball player

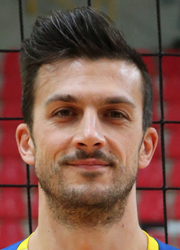

Personal information
- Nationality: Slovenian
- Born: 26 June 1984 (age 42); Izola, Yugoslavia
- Height: 2.02 m (6 ft 8 in)
- Weight: 93 kg (205 lb)
- Spike: 360 cm (142 in)
- Block: 333 cm (131 in)

Volleyball information
- Position: Opposite

Career
Years	Teams
2005–2009; 2009–2010; 2010–2011; 2011–2012; 2012–2013; 2013–2015; 2015–2016; 2016–2019; 2019–2020; 2020–2022; 2022–2023	ACH Volley; Iraklis Thessaloniki; Jastrzębski Węgiel; BluVolley Verona; Cheonan Hyundai Skywalkers; BluVolley Verona; Paris Volley; Incheon Korean Air Jumbos; Wolf Dogs Nagoya; Calcit Kamnik; Foolad Sirjan

National team
2004–2023	Slovenia
Honours
Men's volleyball
Representing Slovenia
FIVB Challenger Cup
Gold medal – first place	2019 Slovenia
CEV European Championship
Silver medal – second place	2015 Bulgaria/Italy
Silver medal – second place	2019 France/Slovenia/Belgium/Netherlands
European League
Gold medal – first place	2015 Poland
Bronze medal – third place	2011 Slovakia

Mitja Gasparini (born 26 June 1984) is a former Slovenian volleyball player. With the Slovenia national team, he was the runner-up at the 2015 and 2019 editions of the European Championship.

== Sporting achievements ==
=== Club ===
- CEV Cup
  - 2006–07 – with Autocommerce Bled
- National championships
  - 2005–06 Slovenian Championship, with Autocommerce Bled
  - 2006–07 Slovenian Championship, with Autocommerce Bled
  - 2007–08 Slovenian Championship, with ACH Volley
  - 2008–09 Slovenian Championship, with ACH Volley
  - 2015–16 French Championship, with Paris Volley
  - 2016–17 South Korean Championship, with Incheon Korean Air Jumbos
  - 2017–18 South Korean Championship, with Incheon Korean Air Jumbos
  - 2018–19 South Korean Championship, with Incheon Korean Air Jumbos

=== Individual awards ===
- 2014: Italian Championship – Best Server
- 2015: Italian Championship – Best Server
