= 2011 Men's European Volleyball League squads =

Below there are the squads from the participating teams of the 2011 Men's European Volleyball League.

== Austria ==
#NR	NAME	BIRTHDATE
2	Philip Schneider	23 December 1981 (age 44)
3	Peter Wohlfahrtstätter	10 March 1989 (age 37)
4	Oliver Binder	28 May 1985 (age 41)
5	Daniel Gavan (C)	8 May 1977 (age 49)
6	Frederick Laure	26 July 1982 (age 44)
7	Michael Laimer	15 July 1985 (age 41)
8	Philip Ichovski	12 December 1991 (age 34)
9	Thomas Zass	27 November 1989 (age 36)
10	Matthias Kienbauer	16 May 1983 (age 43)
12	Alexander Berger	17 March 1987 (age 39)
13	Gerald Reiser	2 June 1980 (age 46)
15	Simon Claudio Frühbauer	19 October 1988 (age 37)
18	Lukas Weber	13 February 1987 (age 39)
Coach	Michael Warm	25 March 1968 (age 58)
