= 2014 Men's European Volleyball League =

2014 Men's European League
Tournament details
- Host country: Two-legged tie
- Dates: 5 June – 27 July
- Teams: 10

Final positions
- Champions: Montenegro (1st title)

Tournament awards
- MVP: (Montenegro) Miloš Ćulafić

The 2014 Men's European Volleyball League was the eleventh edition of the annual men's Men's European Volleyball League, which featured men's national volleyball teams from ten European countries.

Montenegro defeated Greece 5–1 match points in the final, which was played over two legs, to capture their first title.

== Format ==
This year saw no final four tournament. Instead the ten teams were split into two pools and played a single round robin with playing two matchups at home and two away, making a total of eight games for each team. The two top placed teams advanced to the semifinals, from where on a knockout system was used to determine the winner.

== Teams ==
- Austria
- Azerbaijan
- Denmark
- Greece
- Macedonia
- Montenegro
- Poland
- Romania
- Slovenia
- Turkey

== League round ==
- All times are local.

=== Pool A ===
Pos	Team	Pld	W	L	Pts	SW	SL	SR	SPW	SPL	SPR	Qualification
1	Montenegro	8	6	2	17	20	10	2.000	713	632	1.128	Semifinals
2	Greece	8	5	3	15	18	14	1.286	722	704	1.026	Semifinals
3	Romania	8	5	3	13	17	16	1.063	760	737	1.031	
4	Poland	8	4	4	13	18	16	1.125	758	750	1.011	
5	Azerbaijan	8	0	8	2	7	24	0.292	617	747	0.826	

==== Leg 1 ====
Date	Time		Score		Set 1	Set 2	Set 3	Set 4	Set 5	Total	Report
6 Jun	17:30	Poland	2–3	Montenegro	12–25	25–21	17–25	26–24	10–15	90–110	Report
6 Jun	20:00	Romania	0–3	Greece	20–25	23–25	20–25			63–75	Report
7 Jun	20:00	Romania	3–2	Greece	25–18	22–25	23–25	25–16	16–14	111–98	Report
8 Jun	17:30	Poland	1–3	Montenegro	25–27	25–23	14–25	20–25		84–100	Report

==== Leg 2 ====
Date	Time		Score		Set 1	Set 2	Set 3	Set 4	Set 5	Total	Report
13 Jun	20:30	Greece	3–1	Poland	25–22	25–22	20–25	25–22		95–91	Report
14 Jun	16:00	Azerbaijan	1–3	Romania	16–25	18–25	27–25	18–25		79–100	Report
15 Jun	16:00	Azerbaijan	1–3	Romania	23–25	24–26	25–23	20–25		92–99	Report
15 Jun	20:00	Greece	1–3	Poland	20–25	25–21	17–25	21–25		83–96	Report

==== Leg 3 ====
Date	Time		Score		Set 1	Set 2	Set 3	Set 4	Set 5	Total	Report
20 Jun	20:00	Romania	3–1	Montenegro	20–25	25–20	25–22	25–18		95–85	Report
20 Jun	20:00	Greece	3–2	Azerbaijan	25–15	26–28	22–25	25–17	15–10	113–95	Report
21 Jun	20:30	Romania	1–3	Montenegro	25–23	23–25	19–25	21–25		88–98	Report
21 Jun	20:00	Greece	3–1	Azerbaijan	25–17	23–25	25–20	25–16		98–78	Report

==== Leg 4 ====
Date	Time		Score		Set 1	Set 2	Set 3	Set 4	Set 5	Total	Report
28 Jun	17:00	Poland	2–3	Romania	22–25	32–30	20–25	27–25	12–15	113–120	Report
28 Jun	20:00	Montenegro	3–0	Azerbaijan	25–17	25–23	25–18			75–58	Report
29 Jun	15:00	Poland	3–1	Romania	22–25	25–21	25–16	25–22		97–84	Report
29 Jun	20:00	Montenegro	3–0	Azerbaijan	25–17	25–21	25–19			75–57	Report

==== Leg 5 ====
Date	Time		Score		Set 1	Set 2	Set 3	Set 4	Set 5	Total	Report
4 Jul	17:00	Azerbaijan	2–3	Poland	21–25	20–25	25–20	29–27	12–15	107–112	Report
5 Jul	17:00	Azerbaijan	0–3	Poland	16–25	14–25	21–25			51–75	Report
5 Jul	20:00	Montenegro	3–0	Greece	25–20	25–18	29–27			79–65	Report
6 Jul	20:00	Montenegro	1–3	Greece	25–19	19–25	24–26	23–25		91–95	Report

=== Pool B ===
Pos	Team	Pld	W	L	Pts	SW	SL	SR	SPW	SPL	SPR	Qualification
1	Slovenia	8	7	1	21	22	4	5.500	644	523	1.231	Semifinals
2	Macedonia	8	7	1	20	22	9	2.444	735	655	1.122	Semifinals
3	Austria	8	3	5	9	12	16	0.750	622	653	0.953	
4	Turkey	8	3	5	9	10	16	0.625	580	586	0.990	
5	Denmark	8	0	8	1	3	24	0.125	493	657	0.750	

==== Leg 1 ====
Date	Time		Score		Set 1	Set 2	Set 3	Set 4	Set 5	Total	Report
5 Jun	20:15	Austria	1–3	Macedonia	18–25	25–21	14–25	20–25		77–96	Report
6 Jun	20:15	Austria	1–3	Macedonia	26–24	23–25	19–25	23–25		91–99	Report
10 Jun	19:00	Denmark	0–3	Slovenia	13–25	15–25	18–25			46–75	Report
11 Jun	19:00	Denmark	0–3	Slovenia	20–25	17–25	11–25			48–75	Report

==== Leg 2 ====
Date	Time		Score		Set 1	Set 2	Set 3	Set 4	Set 5	Total	Report
13 Jun	15:00	Macedonia	3–2	Denmark	25–17	21–25	25–21	21–25	15–8	107–96	Report
14 Jun	15:00	Macedonia	3–0	Denmark	25–15	25–20	25–22			75–57	Report
14 Jun	18:00	Turkey	3–1	Austria	22–25	25–23	25–19	25–17		97–84	Report
15 Jun	18:00	Turkey	0–3	Austria	25–27	22–25	21–25			68–77	Report

==== Leg 3 ====
Date	Time		Score		Set 1	Set 2	Set 3	Set 4	Set 5	Total	Report
19 Jun	20:15	Austria	0–3	Slovenia	23–25	15–25	16–25			54–75	Report
20 Jun	20:15	Austria	0–3	Slovenia	21–25	22–25	21–25			64–75	Report
21 Jun	19:00	Macedonia	3–1	Turkey	25–21	25–18	21–25	25–20		96–84	Report
22 Jun	15:00	Macedonia	3–0	Turkey	25–18	25–19	25–20			75–57	Report

==== Leg 4 ====
Date	Time		Score		Set 1	Set 2	Set 3	Set 4	Set 5	Total	Report
27 Jun	18:00	Slovenia	3–0	Turkey	25–22	25–23	25–17			75–62	Report
28 Jun	17:00	Slovenia	3–0	Turkey	25–18	26–24	25–20			76–62	Report
28 Jun	19:00	Denmark	1–3	Austria	20–25	22–25	27–25	14–25		83–100	Report
29 Jun	19:00	Denmark	0–3	Austria	21–25	16–25	23–25			60–75	Report

==== Leg 5 ====
Date	Time		Score		Set 1	Set 2	Set 3	Set 4	Set 5	Total	Report
5 Jul	17:00	Turkey	3–0	Denmark	25–21	25–14	25–15			75–50	Report
5 Jul	20:30	Slovenia	3–1	Macedonia	25–19	25–17	23–25	25–22		98–83	Report
6 Jul	17:00	Turkey	3–0	Denmark	25–17	25–14	25–22			75–53	Report
6 Jul	20:30	Slovenia	1–3	Macedonia	21–25	28–26	26–28	20–25		95–104	Report

== Final round ==
- All times are local.

=== Semifinals ===
Team 1	Agg.	Team 2	1st leg	2nd leg	Golden Set
Greece	5–4	Slovenia	2–3	3–1	
Macedonia	4–4	Montenegro	3–1	1–3	10–15

==== Leg 1 ====
Date	Time		Score		Set 1	Set 2	Set 3	Set 4	Set 5	Total	Report
10 Jul	20:00	Macedonia	3–1	Montenegro	25–23	25–22	21–25	25–20		96–90	Report
12 Jul	19:00	Greece	2–3	Slovenia	25–19	26–28	22–25	25–23	11–15	109–110	Report

==== Leg 2 ====
Date	Time		Score		Set 1	Set 2	Set 3	Set 4	Set 5	Total	Report
16 Jul	20:00	Montenegro	3–1	Macedonia	25–21	13–25	25–22	25–23		88–91	Report
Golden set		Montenegro	15–10	Macedonia							
16 Jul	20:00	Slovenia	1–3	Greece	21–25	18–25	25–22	22–25		86–97	Report

=== Final ===
Team 1	Agg.	Team 2	1st leg	2nd leg
Greece	3–6	Montenegro	2–3	1–3

==== Leg 1 ====
Date	Time		Score		Set 1	Set 2	Set 3	Set 4	Set 5	Total	Report
23 Jul	19:00	Greece	2–3	Montenegro	18–25	25–22	25–19	23–25	6–15	97–106	Report

==== Leg 2 ====
Date	Time		Score		Set 1	Set 2	Set 3	Set 4	Set 5	Total	Report
26 Jul	20:00	Montenegro	3–1	Greece	22–25	25–18	25–18	25–21		97–82	Report

== Final standing ==
Rank	Team
1st place, gold medalist(s)	Montenegro
2nd place, silver medalist(s)	Greece
3rd place, bronze medalist(s)	Macedonia
3rd place, bronze medalist(s)	Slovenia
5	Austria
5	Romania
7	Poland
7	Turkey
9	Azerbaijan
9	Denmark

Qualified for the 2015 World League Group 3

== Awards ==
- Most Valuable Player

(Montenegro) Miloš Ćulafić
