= Božidar Ćuk =

Montenegrin volleyball player (born 1992)

Bozidar Cuk

Personal information
- Nationality: Montenegro
- Born: 13 June 1992 (age 34)
- Height: 201 cm (6 ft 7 in)
- Weight: 97 kg (214 lb)
- Spike: 355 cm (140 in)
- Block: 325 cm (128 in)

Volleyball information
- Number: 11 (national team)

Career
Teams
	Narbonne volley Lugano; Olympiacos

National team
Montenegro

Bozidar Cuk (Serbian Cyrillic: Божидар Чук; born 13 June 1992) is a Montenegrin male volleyball player. He is part of the Montenegro men's national volleyball team. On club level he played for Greek powerhouse Olympiacos during the season 2015–16.
