= Aleksandar Okolić =

Serbian volleyball player (born 1993)

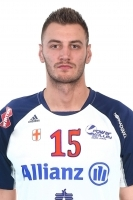
- Profile image of Aleksandar Okolić, volleyball player (SRB)

Personal information
- Nationality: Serbian
- Born: 26 June 1993 (age 33); Modriča, Bosnia and Herzegovina
- Height: 2.05 m (6 ft 9 in)
- Weight: 90 kg (198 lb)
- Spike: 347 cm (137 in)
- Block: 320 cm (126 in)

Volleyball information
- Position: Middle blocker
- Current club: VK České Budějovice
- Number: 1

Career
Years	Teams
2008–2016	Crvena Zvezda Beograd
2016–2018	Berlin Recycling Volleys
2018–2019	PAOK Thessaloniki
2019–2020	Revivre Milano
2020–2021	Olympiacos Piraeus
2021–2022	Gazprom-Ugra
2022–2023	Crvena Zvezda Beograd
2024–	VK České Budějovice

National team
2015–	Serbia
Honours
Men's volleyball
Representing Serbia
European Championship
Gold medal – first place	2019 Belgium/France/Netherlands/Slovenia
Bronze medal – third place	2017 Poland
World League
Gold medal – first place	2016 Kraków
Silver medal – second place	2015 Rio de Janeiro
U19 World Championship
Gold medal – first place	2011 Argentina
- Last updated: 3 September 2017

Aleksandar Okolić (born 26 June 1993) is a Serbian male volleyball player. He is part of the Serbia men's national volleyball team and played at the 2015 Men's European Volleyball Championship. On club level he plays for VK České Budějovice

== Sporting achievements ==
=== Club ===
National Championships

- 2011/2012 Serbian Championship, with Crvena Zvezda
- 2012/2013 Serbian Championship, with Crvena Zvezda
- 2013/2014 Serbian Championship, with Crvena Zvezda
- 2014/2015 Serbian Championship, with Crvena Zvezda
- 2015/2016 Serbian Championship, with Crvena Zvezda
- 2016/2017 German Championship, with Berlin Recycling
- 2017/2018 German Championship, with Berlin Recycling
- 2020/2021 Greek Championship, with Olympiacos

National Cups

- 2008/2009 Serbian Cup, with Crvena Zvezda
- 2010/2011 Serbian Cup, with Crvena Zvezda
- 2012/2013 Serbian Cup, with Crvena Zvezda
- 2013/2014 Serbian Cup, with Crvena Zvezda
- 2014/2015 Serbian Cup, with Crvena Zvezda
- 2018/2019 Greek Cup, with P.A.O.K.
- 2018/2019 German Cup, with Berlin Recycling

National Super Cups

- 2012 Serbian Super Cup, with Crvena Zvezda.
- 2013 Serbian Super Cup, with Crvena Zvezda
- 2014 Serbian Super Cup, with Crvena Zvezda
- 2015 Serbian Super Cup, with Crvena Zvezda

=== National team ===
- 2015 FIVB World League
- 2016 FIVB World League
- 2017 CEV European Championship
- 2019 CEV European Championship
