= Jani Kovačič =

Slovenian volleyball player (born 1992)

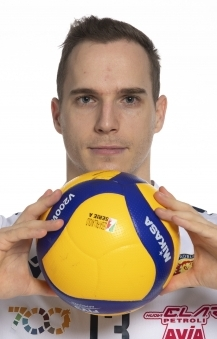
- Kovačič in 2019

Personal information
- Nationality: Slovenian
- Born: 14 June 1992 (age 34); Šempeter pri Gorici, Slovenia
- Height: 1.86 m (6 ft 1 in)
- Weight: 83 kg (183 lb)
- Spike: 320 cm (126 in)
- Block: 310 cm (122 in)

Volleyball information
- Position: Libero
- Current club: ACH Volley

Career
Years	Teams
2009–2014; 2014–2015; 2015–2016; 2016–2019; 2019–2021; 2021–	Salonit Anhovo; SK Aich/Dob; AS Cannes; ACH Volley; Porto Robur Costa; ACH Volley

National team
2012–	Slovenia
Honours
Men's volleyball
Representing Slovenia
FIVB Challenger Cup
Gold medal – first place	2019 Slovenia
CEV European Championship
Silver medal – second place	2015 Bulgaria/Italy
Silver medal – second place	2019 France/Slovenia/Belgium/Netherlands
Silver medal – second place	2021 Poland/Czech Republic/Estonia/Finland
Bronze medal – third place	2023 Italy/Bulgaria/North Macedonia/Israel
European League
Gold medal – first place	2015 Poland

Jani Kovačič (born 14 June 1992) is a Slovenian professional volleyball player who plays as a libero for ACH Volley and the Slovenia national team. With Slovenia, he competed in the 2015 European Championship. He also represented the country at the 2024 Summer Olympics.

== Honours ==
=== Club ===
- Domestic
  - 2009–10 Slovenian Championship, with Salonit Anhovo
  - 2014–15 Austrian Championship, with SK Aich/Dob
  - 2016–17 Slovenian Championship, with ACH Volley
  - 2017–18 Slovenian Championship, with ACH Volley
  - 2018–19 Slovenian Championship, with ACH Volley

=== Individual awards ===
- 2019: CEV European Championship – Best libero
