= Blažo Milić =

Montenegrin volleyball player (born 1987)

Blazo Milic

Personal information
- Nationality: Montenegro
- Born: 22 November 1987 (age 38)
- Height: 210 cm (6 ft 11 in)
- Weight: 88 kg (194 lb)
- Spike: 340 cm (134 in)
- Block: 330 cm (130 in)

Volleyball information
- Number: 14 (national team)

Career
Years	Teams
2015	Nafels

National team
2015	Montenegro

Blazo Milic (born 22 November 1987) is a Montenegrin male volleyball player. He is part of the Montenegro men's national volleyball team. On club level he plays for Nafels.
