= Slovenia men's national volleyball team =

Slovenia
- Association: Volleyball Federation of Slovenia (OZS)
- Confederation: CEV
- Head coach: Fabio Soli
- FIVB ranking: 7 ▼3 (1 October 2026)

Uniforms
| Home | Away | Third |

Summer Olympics
- Appearances: 1 (First in 2024)
- Best result: Quarterfinals (2024)

World Championship
- Appearances: 3 (First in 2018)
- Best result: Fourth place (2022)

European Championship
- Appearances: 11 (First in 2001)
- Best result: Runners-up (2015, 2019, 2021)
- www.odbojka.si (in Slovene)
Honours
| Event | 1st | 2nd | 3rd |
|---|---|---|---|
| Nations League | 0 | 0 | 1 |
| European Championship | 0 | 3 | 1 |
| Challenger Cup | 1 | 0 | 0 |
| European League | 1 | 0 | 2 |
| Total | 2 | 3 | 4 |
Medal record
Nations League
| Bronze medal – third place | 2026 China | Team |
European Championship
| Silver medal – second place | 2015 Bulgaria | Team |
| Silver medal – second place | 2019 France | Team |
| Silver medal – second place | 2021 Poland | Team |
| Bronze medal – third place | 2023 Italy | Team |
Challenger Cup
| Gold medal – first place | 2019 Slovenia | Team |
European League
| Gold medal – first place | 2015 Poland | |
| Bronze medal – third place | 2011 Slovakia | Team |
| Bronze medal – third place | 2014 | Team |

The Slovenia men's national volleyball team represents Slovenia in international volleyball competitions and friendly matches, and is governed by the Volleyball Federation of Slovenia. The team made its debut at major tournaments in 2001, when it competed at the European Volleyball Championship. Between 2015 and 2021, Slovenia reached the final of the European Championship three times and finished as runners-up on all three occasions after losing to France, Serbia and Italy, respectively.

As of September 2026, Slovenia is ranked seventh in the FIVB World Rankings.

== History ==
The Slovenia national team played its first official match on 24 April 1992, under the leadership of Viktor Krevsel. They first appeared at the European Volleyball Championship in 2001, where they took last place among twelve teams.

In March 2015, Andrea Giani was appointed as the head coach of Slovenia. He led the team to its first medal at the 2015 Men's European Volleyball Championship, when Slovenia lost 3–0 to France in the final. Tine Urnaut won one of the individual player awards for the best outside spiker.

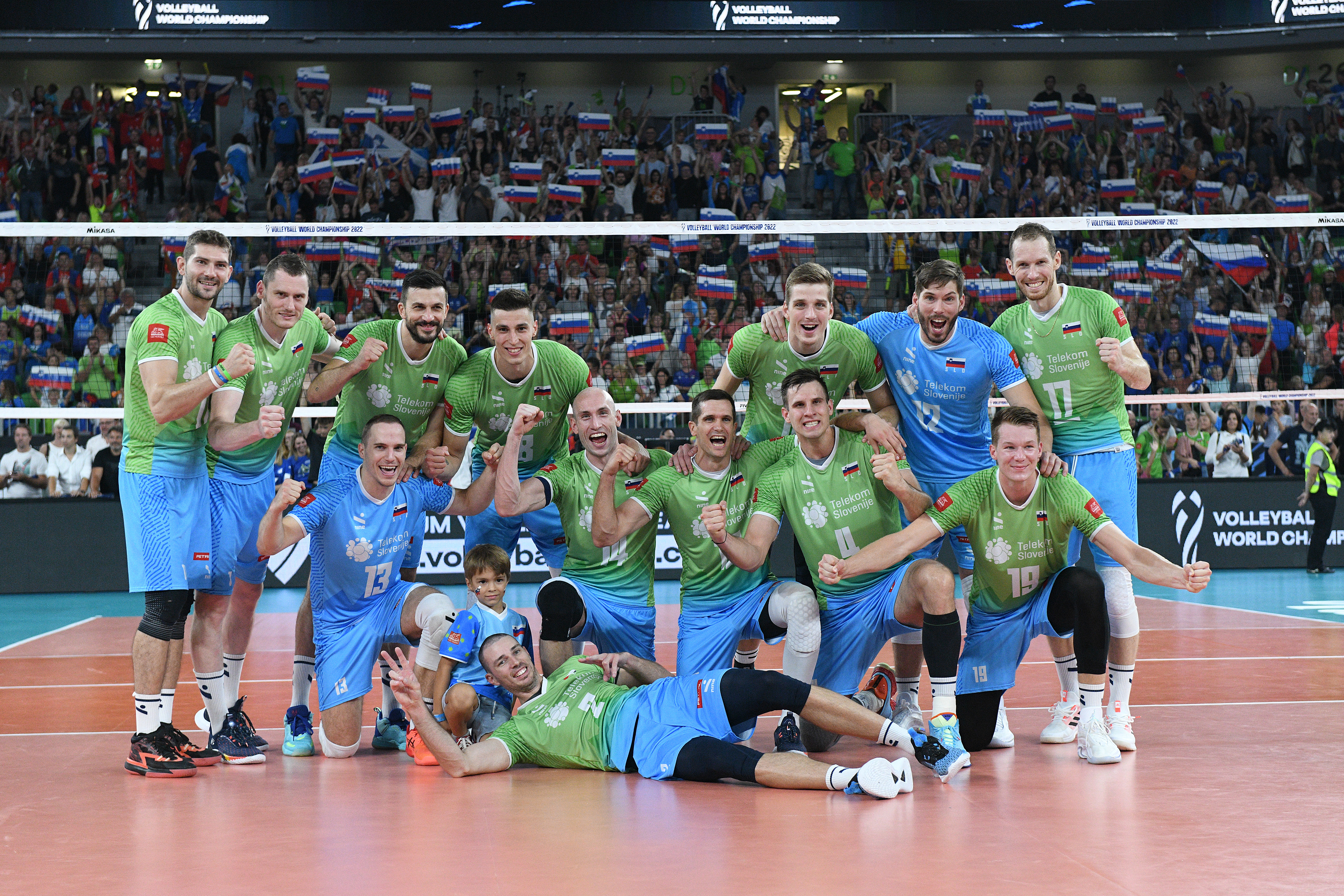
Slovenian team at the 2022 World Championship, hosted by Slovenia.

In January 2017, Giani resigned as coach and Slobodan Kovač took over the team. In the same year, Slovenia qualified for the 2018 edition of the FIVB Volleyball Men's World Championship, their first ever World Championship appearance, after beating Belgium in the qualifiers. Two years after his appointment, in January 2019, the Volleyball Federation of Slovenia and Kovač both agreed to part ways and terminate the contract. He was replaced by Alberto Giuliani.

Slovenia hosted the 2019 edition of the FIVB Volleyball Men's Challenger Cup at home in Ljubljana. The team reached the final, where they defeated Cuba 3–0 and earned the right to participate in the 2020 Nations League, replacing Portugal; however, the competition was cancelled due to the COVID-19 pandemic, and Slovenia qualified for the 2021 edition instead. At their Nations League debut in Rimini, Italy, the team reached the final round as the only challenger team, where they lost 3–0 both to Poland and France in the semifinals and in the third place match, respectively.

At the 2019 European Championship, Slovenia was one of the four co-hosts of the tournament. The team reached the final again, where they lost 3–1 to Serbia, clinching their second silver medal in four years. Two years later, at the 2021 European Championship, Slovenia once again reached the final. After defeating hosts Poland in the semifinals, they lost the final 3–2 against Italy to claim their third silver medal. Gregor Ropret was selected in the All Star Team as the best setter through fan votes. Giuliani decided to step down as head coach after the tournament, and was replaced by Mark Lebedew from February 2022. After failing to reach the top 8 in the 2022 Nations League, he was sacked and replaced by Gheorghe Crețu in August 2022, just two weeks before the start of the 2022 FIVB Men's Volleyball World Championship, co-hosted by Slovenia and Poland.

== Competitive record ==
Key

Champions Runners-up Third place As host

=== Olympic Games ===
Olympic Games record
| Year | Round | Position | GP | W | L | SW | SL | Squad |
|---|---|---|---|---|---|---|---|---|
| 2024 | Quarterfinals | 5th place | 4 | 3 | 1 | 10 | 6 | Squad |

=== World Cup ===
Before 2026, the competition was known as the World Championship.

World Cup record
| Year | Round | Position | GP | W | L | SW | SL | Squad |
|---|---|---|---|---|---|---|---|---|
| 2018 | Second round | 12th place | 8 | 4 | 4 | 17 | 16 | Squad |
| 2022 | Semifinals | 4th place | 7 | 4 | 3 | 15 | 11 | Squad |
| 2025 | Round of 16 | 11th place | 4 | 2 | 2 | 9 | 7 | Squad |
| 2027 | Qualified | | | | | | | |

=== European Championship ===
European Championship record
| Year | Round | Position | GP | W | L | SW | SL | Squad |
|---|---|---|---|---|---|---|---|---|
| 2001 | Group stage | 12th place | 5 | 0 | 5 | 3 | 15 | Squad |
| 2007 | Group stage | 16th place | 3 | 0 | 3 | 2 | 9 | Squad |
| 2009 | Group stage | 15th place | 3 | 0 | 3 | 1 | 9 | Squad |
| 2011 | Playoffs | 9th place | 4 | 2 | 2 | 9 | 8 | Squad |
| 2013 | Group stage | 13th place | 3 | 1 | 2 | 5 | 7 | Squad |
| 2015 | Final | Silver medalists | 7 | 4 | 3 | 14 | 12 | Squad |
| 2017 | Quarterfinals | 8th place | 5 | 2 | 3 | 6 | 9 | Squad |
| 2019 | Final | Silver medalists | 9 | 6 | 3 | 20 | 13 | Squad |
| 2021 | Final | Silver medalists | 9 | 6 | 3 | 21 | 11 | Squad |
| 2023 | Semifinals | Bronze medalists | 9 | 8 | 1 | 25 | 9 | Squad |
| 2026 | Semifinals | 4th place | 9 | 5 | 4 | 18 | 14 | Squad |

=== World League ===
World League record
| Year | Round | Position | GP | W | L | SW | SL |
|---|---|---|---|---|---|---|---|
| 2016 | G3 Final | 25th place | 8 | 7 | 1 | 22 | 6 |
| 2017 | G2 Final | 13th place | 11 | 10 | 1 | 32 | 10 |

=== Nations League ===
Nations League record
| Year | Round | Position | GP | W | L | SW | SL | Squad |
|---|---|---|---|---|---|---|---|---|
| 2021 | Semifinals | 4th place | 17 | 12 | 5 | 40 | 24 | Squad |
| 2022 | Preliminary round | 10th place | 12 | 5 | 7 | 18 | 24 | Squad |
| 2023 | Quarterfinals | 7th place | 13 | 8 | 5 | 27 | 20 | Squad |
| 2024 | Semifinals | 4th place | 15 | 12 | 3 | 37 | 22 | Squad |
| 2025 | Semifinals | 4th place | 15 | 8 | 7 | 27 | 29 | Squad |
| 2026 | Semifinals | Bronze medalists | 15 | 12 | 3 | 38 | 21 | Squad |

=== Challenger Cup ===
Challenger Cup record
| Year | Round | Position | GP | W | L | SW | SL |
|---|---|---|---|---|---|---|---|
| 2019 | Final | Champions | 4 | 4 | 0 | 12 | 2 |

=== European League ===
European League record
| Year | Round | Position | GP | W | L | SW | SL |
|---|---|---|---|---|---|---|---|
| 2007 | Semifinals | 4th place | 14 | 9 | 5 | 34 | 25 |
| 2011 | Semifinals | Bronze medalists | 14 | 10 | 4 | 33 | 19 |
| 2014 | Semifinals | Bronze medalists | 10 | 8 | 2 | 26 | 9 |
| 2015 | Final | Champions | 12 | 12 | 0 | 36 | 5 |
| 2018 | Pool stage | 12th place | 6 | 1 | 5 | 5 | 17 |

== Team ==
=== Current squad ===
The following is Slovenia's roster for the 2026 Men's European Volleyball Championship.

Head coach: (Italy) Fabio Soli

- 2 Alen Pajenk MB
- 3 Uroš Planinšič S
- 4 Jan Kozamernik MB
- 7 Luka Marovt OH
- 8 Rok Bračko OH
- 10 Sašo Štalekar MB
- 12 Grega Okroglič L
- 13 Jani Kovačič L
- 17 Tine Urnaut OH
- 18 Klemen Čebulj OH
- 19 Rok Možič OH
- 20 Nik Mujanović O
- 22 Janž Janez Kržič MB
- 24 Nejc Najdič S
- 25 Klemen Šen OH

== Head coaches ==
List of Slovenia's national team head coaches
| Name | C | From | To | Achievements |
|---|---|---|---|---|
| Viktor Krevsel | (Slovenia) | 1992 | | |
| Luka Lobnik | (Slovenia) | 1992 | | |
| Viktor Krevsel | (Slovenia) | 1993 | 1996 | |
| Vladimir Janković | (Croatia) | 1996 | 1997 | |
| Gregor Hribar | (Slovenia) | 1997 | 2005 | |
| Iztok Kšela | (Slovenia) | 2005 | 2008 | |
| Gregor Hribar | (Slovenia) | 2008 | 2010 | |
| Veselin Vuković | (Montenegro) | 2010 | 2012 | |
| Luka Slabe | (Slovenia) | 2012 | 2015 | |
| Andrea Giani | (Italy) | 2015 | 2017 | (silver) 2015 European Championship |
| Slobodan Kovač | (Serbia) | 2017 | 2019 | |
| Alberto Giuliani | (Italy) | 2019 | 2021 | (gold) 2019 Challenger Cup; (silver) 2019 European Championship; (silver) 2021 European Championship |
| Mark Lebedew | (Australia) | 2022 | | |
| Gheorghe Crețu | (Romania) | 2022 | 2024 | (bronze) 2023 European Championship |
| Fabio Soli | (Italy) | 2025 | present | (bronze) 2026 Nations League |
