= Luka Babić (volleyball) =

Montenegrin volleyball player (born 1994)

Personal information
- Nationality: Montenegro
- Born: 7 July 1994 (age 32)
- Hometown: Podgorica
- Height: 211 cm (6 ft 11 in)
- Weight: 105 kg (231 lb)
- Spike: 340 cm (134 in)
- Block: 330 cm (130 in)

Volleyball information
- Position: Middle blocker, Outside hitter
- Number: 3 (national team)

Career
Years	Teams
-2015	(Montenegro) OK Budućnost Podgorica
2015–2016	(Montenegro) Budvanska Rivijera Budva
2016–present	(Switzerland) Chênois Genève
2023–2024	(Ukraine) Zhytychi-Polissya

National team
2015–2017	Montenegro

Luka Babić (born 7 July 1994) is a Montenegrin male volleyball player. An all-rounder, playing as middle blocker and outside hitter, he played with OK Budućnost Podgorica until 2015, after which he spent a season with Budvanska Rivijera Budva, the national champions. He signed for Swiss team Chênois Genève for the 2016/17 season.

Babić played with the Montenegro men's national volleyball team in 2015 and 2016 editions of the FIVB Volleyball World League.
