= Robert Viiber =

Estonian volleyball player (born 1997)

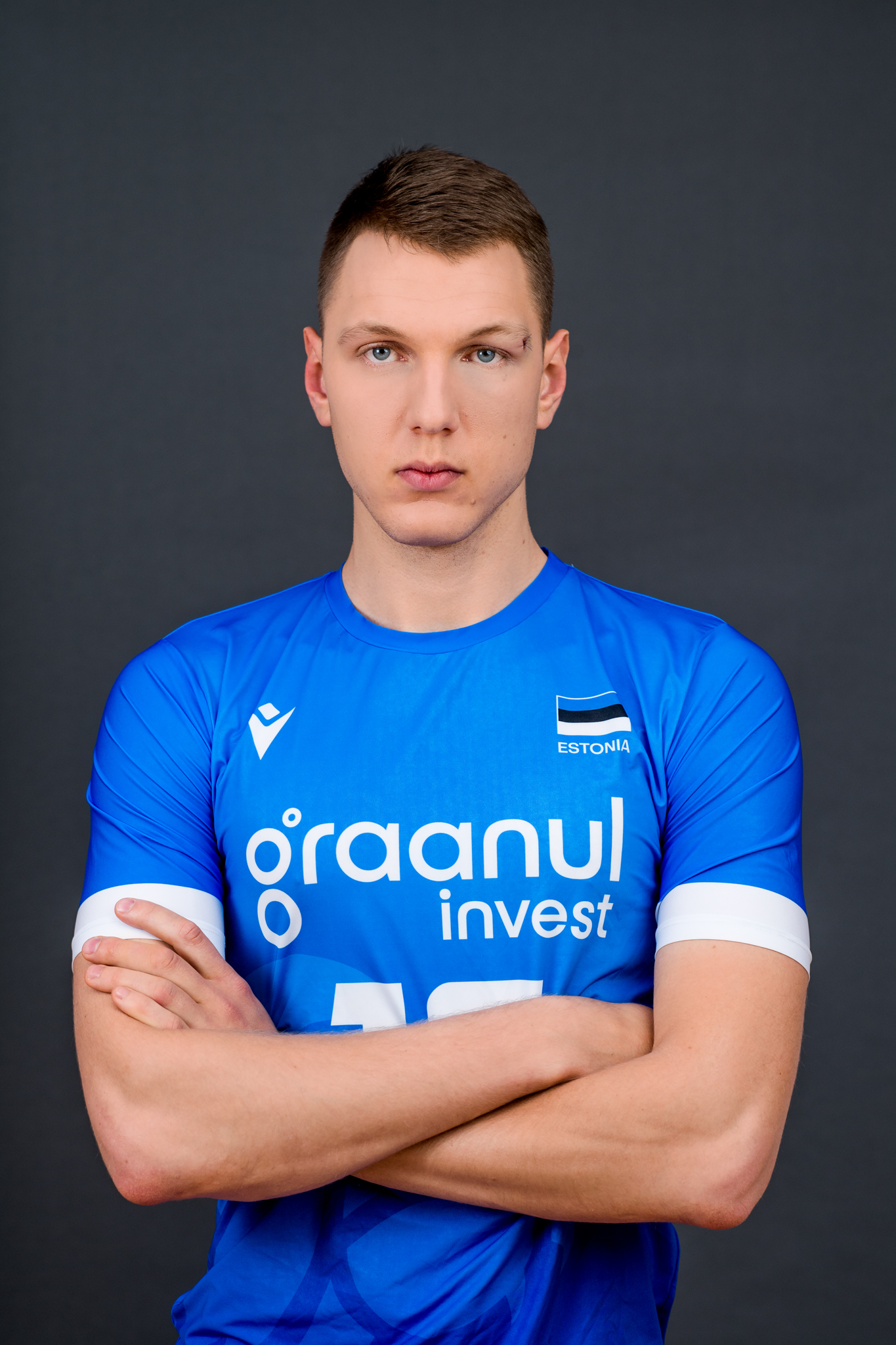

Personal information
- Full name: Robert Viiber
- Nationality: Estonian
- Born: 31 January 1997; Rakvere, Estonia

National team
Estonia

Robert Viiber (born 31 January 1997) is an Estonian volleyball player. He is a member of the Estonian national team and represented his country at the 2021 European Volleyball Championships.
