= Alberto Giuliani =

Italian volleyball coach (born 1964)

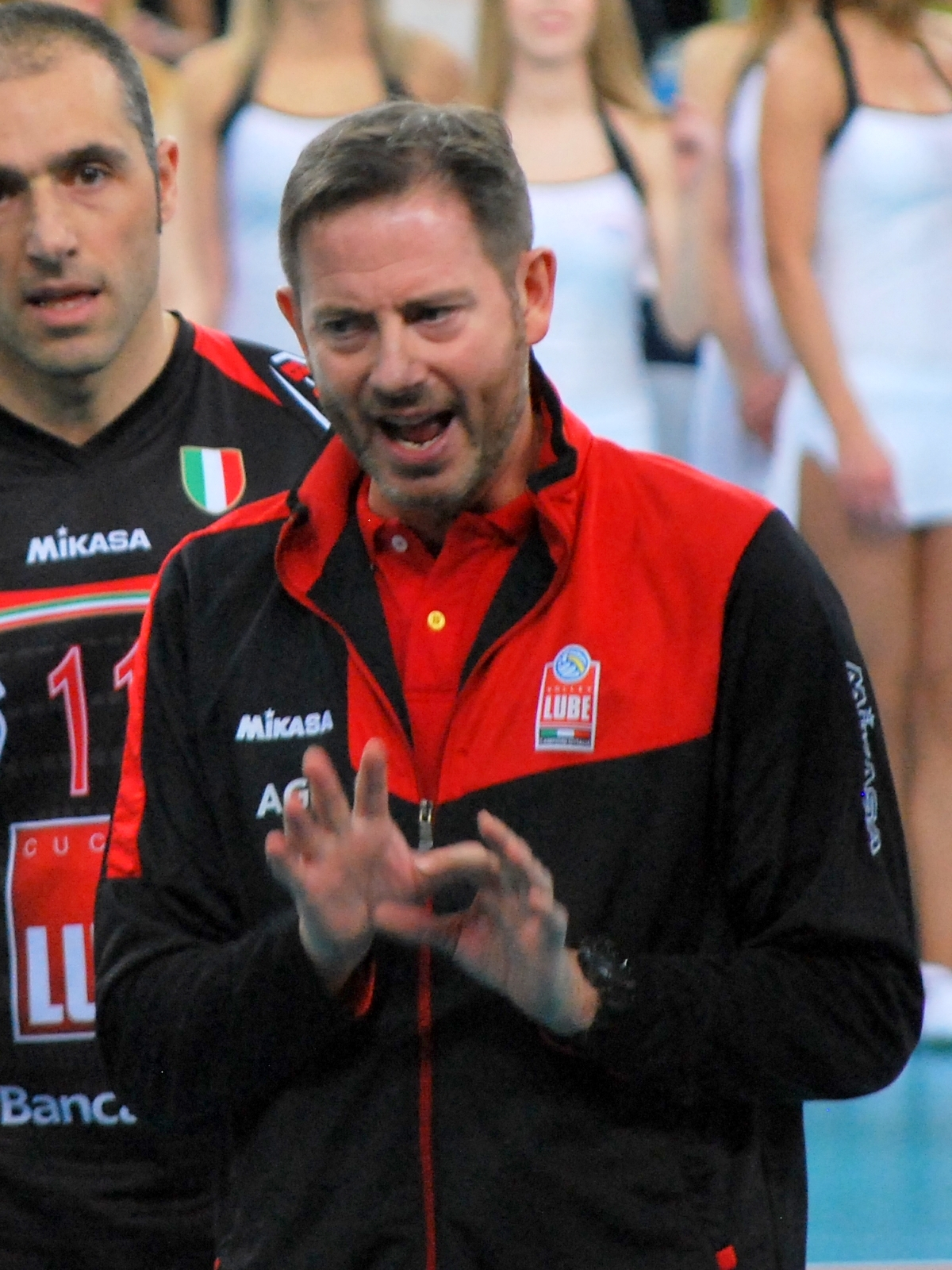

Personal information
- Born: 25 December 1964 (age 61) San Severino Marche, Italy

Coaching information
- Current team: Modena Volley
- Previous teams coached
- Years: Teams
- 2002–2006 2006–2008 2008–2009 2009–2011 2011–2015 2015–2016 2015–2018 2018–2019 2019–2021 2020–2021 2022–2023 2023 2023 2024–2026 2026–: Pallavolo Loreto; Corigliano Volley; Marmi Lanza Verona; Bre Banca Lannutti Cuneo; Volley Lube; Slovakia; Volley Piacenza; Halkbank Ankara; Slovenia; Asseco Resovia; Olympiacos Piraeus; Turkey; Hebar Pazardzhik; Modena Volley; Olympiacos Piraeus
Honours
Men's volleyball
Head coach Slovenia
FIVB Challenger Cup
Gold medal – first place	2019 Slovenia
CEV European Championship
Silver medal – second place	2019 Belgium/France/Netherlands/Slovenia
Silver medal – second place	2021 Poland/Czechia/Estonia/Finland
Head coach Turkey
FIVB Challenger Cup
Gold medal – first place	2023 Doha
European League
Gold medal – first place	2023 Croatia

Alberto Giuliani (born 25 December 1964) is an Italian professional volleyball coach who works for Modena Volley.

== Personal life ==
His son, Ludovico (born 1998) is a professional volleyball player.

== Honours ==
=== Club ===
- CEV Cup
  - 2009–10 – with Bre Banca Lannutti Cuneo
- CEV Challenge Cup
  - 2022–23 – with Olympiacos
- Domestic
  - 2009–10 Italian Championship, with Bre Banca Lannutti Cuneo
  - 2010–11 Italian SuperCup, with Bre Banca Lannutti Cuneo
  - 2010–11 Italian Cup, with Bre Banca Lannutti Cuneo
  - 2011–12 Italian Championship, with Lube Banca Marche Macerata
  - 2012–13 Italian SuperCup, with Cucine Lube Banca Marche Macerata
  - 2013–14 Italian Championship, with Cucine Lube Banca Marche Macerata
  - 2014–15 Italian SuperCup, with Cucine Lube Banca Marche Treia
  - 2018–19 Turkish SuperCup, with Halkbank Ankara
  - 2022–23 Greek Championship, with Olympiacos

Sporting positions
Preceded by (Serbia) Slobodan Kovač	Head coach of Slovenia; 2019–2021	Succeeded by (Australia) Mark Lebedew
