= Marko Vukašinović =

Montenegrin volleyball player (born 1993)

Marko Vukasinovic

Personal information
- Nationality: Montenegro
- Born: 30 July 1993 (age 33)
- Height: 195 cm (6 ft 5 in)
- Weight: 86 kg (190 lb)
- Spike: 330 cm (130 in)
- Block: 320 cm (126 in)

Volleyball information
- Current club: Porto Robur Costa
- Number: 16 (national team)

Career
Years	Teams
2015	Porto Robur Costa

National team
2015	Montenegro

Marko Vukasinovic (born 30 July 1993) is a Montenegrin male volleyball player. He is part of the Montenegro men's national volleyball team. On club level he plays for Porto Robur Costa .
