= Rajko Strugar =

Montenegrin volleyball player (born 1995)

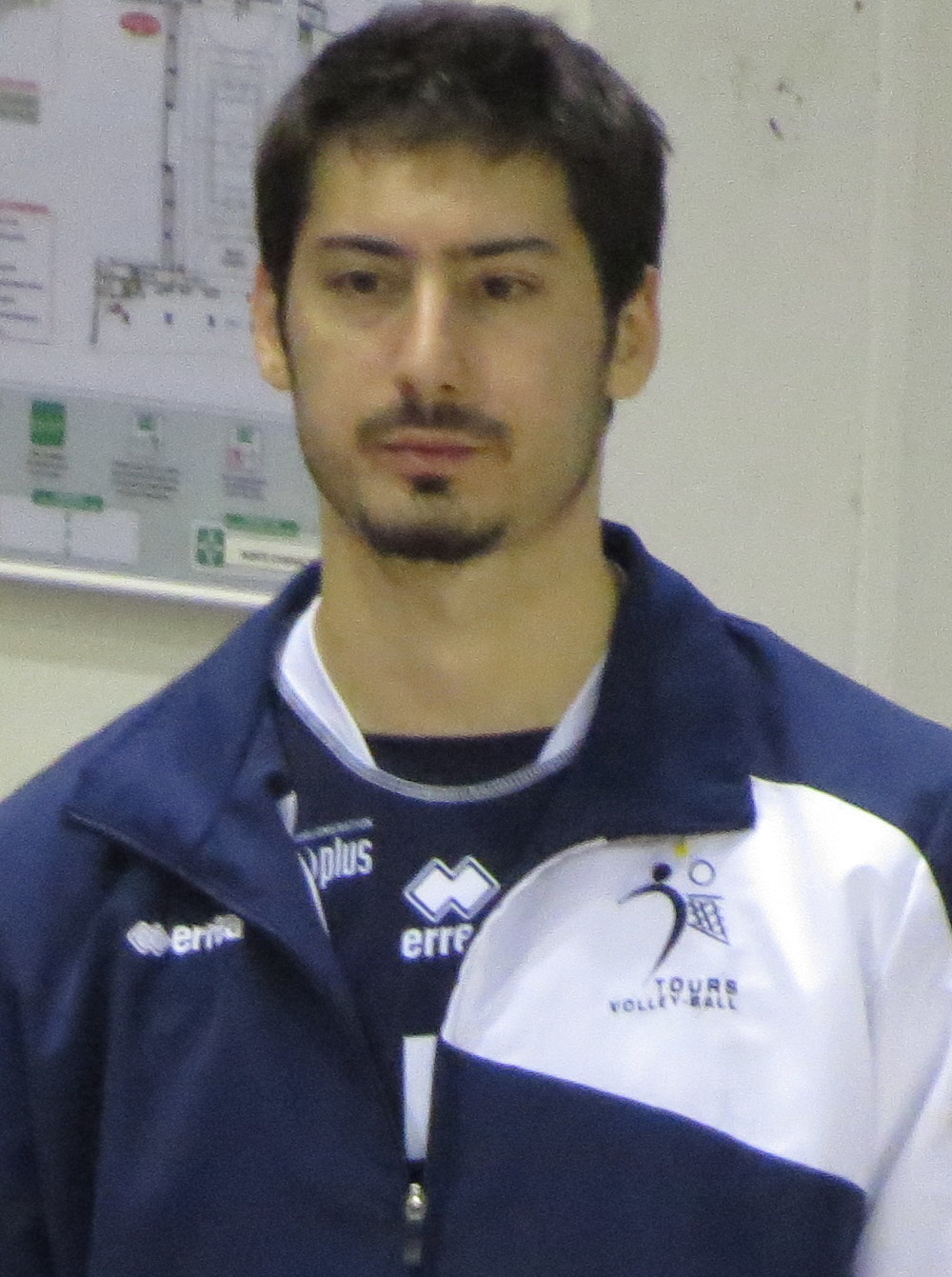
- Strugar with Tours in April 2016

Personal information
- Nationality: Montenegro
- Born: 11 April 1995 (age 31); Cetinje, FR Yugoslavia
- Hometown: Budva, Montenegro
- Height: 193 cm (6 ft 4 in)
- Weight: 85 kg (187 lb)
- Spike: 330 cm (130 in)
- Block: 320 cm (126 in)

Volleyball information
- Position: Setter

Career
Years	Teams
2011–2014	Vojvodina
2014–2015	Orange Nassau
2015–2016	Tours
2016–2017	Prievidza
2017–2018	Olympias Frenarou
2018–2019	Ethnikos Alexandroupolis
2019–2020	Amriswil
2020–2021	Khatam Ardakan
2021–2022	Reshetylivka

National team
2015–	Montenegro

Rajko Strugar (born 11 April 1995) is a Montenegrin male volleyball who last played as a setter for Ukrainian club Reshetylivka and the Montenegro national team.
