= Ivan Ječmenica =

Montenegrin volleyball player (born 1990)

Ivan Jecmenica

Personal information
- Nationality: Montenegro
- Born: 17 March 1990 (age 36)
- Height: 202 cm (6 ft 8 in)
- Weight: 90 kg (198 lb)
- Spike: 338 cm (133 in)
- Block: 330 cm (130 in)

Volleyball information
- Number: 17 (national team)

Career
Years	Teams
2015	Budvanska Rivijera

National team
2015	Montenegro

Ivan Jecmenica (born 17 March 1990) is a Montenegrin male volleyball player. He is part of the Montenegro men's national volleyball team. On club level he plays for Budvanska Rivijera.
