= Gojko Ćuk =

Montenegrin volleyball player (born 1988)

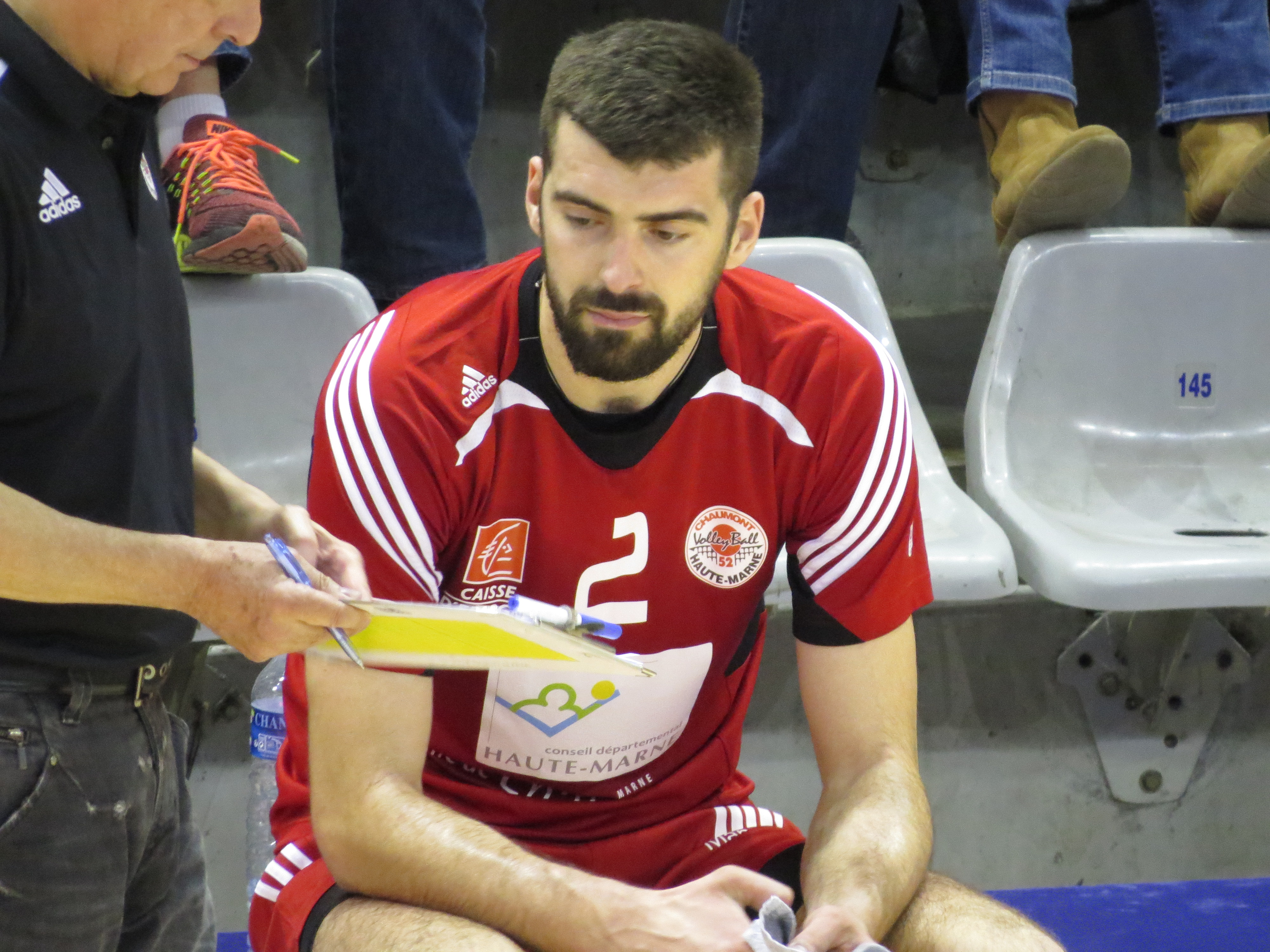

Personal information
- Nationality: Montenegro
- Born: 10 October 1988 (age 38)
- Height: 209 cm (6 ft 10 in)
- Weight: 101 kg (223 lb)
- Spike: 345 cm (136 in)
- Block: 335 cm (132 in)

Volleyball information
- Number: 4 (national team)

Career
Years	Teams
2015	Chaumont

National team
2014-	Montenegro

Gojko Ćuk (born 10 October 1988) is a Montenegrin male volleyball player. He is part of the Montenegro men's national volleyball team. On club level he plays for Nice Volley-Ball, Nice Volleu-ball.
