= Montenegro men's national volleyball team =

Volleyball team

Montenegro
- Association: Volleyball Federation of Montenegro
- Confederation: CEV
- Head coach: Ivan Joksimović
- FIVB ranking: 65 (3 August 2026)

Uniforms
Home	Away
- www.oscg.me

The Montenegro men's national volleyball team represents Montenegro in international men's volleyball competitions and friendly matches. The national volleyball team was formed in 2006, recently after independence. Montenegro has been a full member of FIVB and CEV since 2006.

Montenegro played their first official match on 1 September 2007 in Podgorica and won against Latvia (3–1).

Until 2017, at major tournaments, Montenegro played in FIVB World League and European League. Montenegro made main success at 2014, winning the gold medal in European League.

== History ==
Soon after the 2006 Montenegrin independence referendum, the Volleyball Federation of Montenegro founded national teams. The men's team started to play in 2007, with the first match against Latvia (3–1, Olympic Games qualifiers).

From 2007 to 2013, Montenegro played three times in European Championship qualifiers, but without significant success. At the same time, the team played two times in qualifiers for Olympic Games and once in qualifiers for World Championship.

First better result, Montenegrin team made at 2013, on their debut in European League. After 12 games, Montenegro won fifth place among 12 European teams. A year later, Montenegrin volleyball team made their major success until today, with the gold medal in European League 2014. In the finals, Montenegro won both games against Greece (3–1, 3–2).

After the result in European League, during summer 2015, Montenegro debuted in FIVB World League. As a member of Pool C, Montenegro won the group at first stage of World League and qualified for final tournament (Pool B promotion) in Bratislava. At semifinals, Montenegro eliminated China (3–1). In the final game, Montenegro lost against Egypt (2–3), so they didn't qualify for World League Pool B competition. In the end, Montenegro won 22nd position in 2015 FIVB World League.

A year later, Montenegro played in 2016 FIVB Volleyball World League, again in Pool C, but didn't make similar result as 2015. Montenegro finished World League season as a fourth-placed team in Pool C, but didn't qualify for the final tournament. The reason was that Germany, as a host nation, directly qualified for the finals.

In summer 2016, Montenegro played in the main round of 2017 Men's European Volleyball Championship qualification, but failed to qualify for the final tournament. Same result, Montenegrin team made in 2018 World Championship qualifiers, finishing as a third placed team in Group D.

Biggest success for Montenegrin team came at 2019. After the games against Slovakia, Moldova and Iceland, they qualified for European Championship 2019.

== Competitive record ==
Until now, Montenegro never played on World Championship or Olympic Games. They participated in European Volleyball Championship (2), FIVB Volleyball World League (3) and European Volleyball League (2).
Biggest success of the team was gold medal at 2014 Men's European Volleyball League.

=== World Championship ===
Montenegro men's national volleyball team participated in the qualifiers for one World Championship (2014), but never played at main competition.

World Championship					Qualification		
Year	Pos.	Pld	W	L	Pld	W	L
1949–1990	Part of Yugoslavia						
1994–2006	Part of Serbia and Montenegro						
(Italy) 2010	did not qualify				7	4	3
(Poland) 2014	did not qualify				3	1	2
(Italy) / (Bulgaria) 2018	did not qualify				5	2	3
(Poland) / (Slovenia) 2022	did not qualify				did not qualify		
(Philippines) 2025	did not qualify				did not qualify		
(Poland) 2027	to be determined				to be determined		
(Qatar) 2029	to be determined				to be determined		
Total		0	0	0	8	3	5

As of May 30, 2018

=== European Championship ===
Montenegro men's national volleyball team played five times in the qualifiers for European Championship (2009, 2011, 2013, 2015, 2017), they have played at main four times (2019,2021, 2023, 2028). They will participate in the 2028 edition as co-host.

European Championship					Qualification		
Year	Pos.	Pld	W	L	Pld	W	L
1948–1991	Part of Yugoslavia						
1993–2005	Part of Serbia and Montenegro						
(Turkey) 2009	did not qualify				8	4	4
(Austria) / (Czech Republic) 2011	did not qualify				6	1	5
(Denmark) / (Poland) 2013	did not qualify				6	2	4
(Bulgaria) / (Italy) 2015	did not qualify				6	3	3
(Poland) 2017	did not qualify				6	3	3
(Belgium) / (France) / (Slovenia) / (Netherlands) 2019	18.	5	2	3	6	4	2
(Poland) / (Czech Republic) / (Estonia) / (Finland) 2021	24.	5	0	5	6	5	1
(Italy) / (Bulgaria) / (North Macedonia) / (Israel) 2023	19.	5	1	4	6	5	1
(Bulgaria) / (Finland) / (Italy) / (Romania) 2026	did not qualify				4	1	3
(Montenegro) 2028	qualified as co-host				qualified as co-host		
Total	4 / 9	15	3	12	54	28	26

=== Olympic Games ===
Montenegro men's national volleyball team played two times in the qualifiers for Olympic Games (2008, 2012), but never played at main competition.

Summer Olympic Games					Qualification		
Year	Pos.	Pld	W	L	Pld	W	L
(China) 2008	did not qualify				4	2	2
(United Kingdom) 2012	did not qualify				4	3	1
(Brazil) 2016	did not qualify				-	-	-
(Japan) 2020	did not qualify				-	-	-
(France) 2024	did not qualify				-	-	-
(United States) 2028	to be determined				to be determined		
(Australia) 2032	to be determined				to be determined		
Total	0 / 7	0	0	0	8	5	3

=== European League ===
Montenegro men's national volleyball team played twice in Men's European Volleyball League, with the gold medal from 2014 edition. That was the main success in the history of Montenegrin national volleyball team.

European League
Year	Pos.	Pld	W	L
(Turkey) 2013	5th place	12	9	3
(European Union) 2014	1st place, gold medalist(s)	12	9	3
(Czech Republic) 2025	12th place	6	0	6
(Finland) (Netherlands) 2026	19th place	6	2	4
Total		36	20	16

=== World League ===
Montenegro men's national volleyball team played three times in FIVB Volleyball World League (2015, 2016 and 2017). At their first performance, Montenegro won 22nd place and played on Pool C final tournament. Year later, Montenegro won 29th place in FIVB World League and in 2017 finished in 31st place.

FIVB Volleyball World League
Year	Pos.	Pld	W	L
(Brazil) 2015	22nd place	8	6	2
(Poland) 2016	29th place	6	4	2
(Brazil) 2017	31st place	6	3	3
Total		20	13	7

== Head coaches ==
Since 2007, the national team of Montenegro has been led by six different head coaches. Most successful coach were Slobodan Boškan, who won the gold medal on European League with Montenegrin team and Veljko Bašić, who led Montenegro to 2019 European Volleyball Championship and 2021 European Volleyball Championship.

Period	Coach	Score		%
2007-2009	(Montenegro) Veselin Vuković	12	6-6	50%
2010-2011	(Croatia) Rade Malević	6	1-5	17%
2011-2013	(Serbia) Ivan Joksimović	10	5-5	50%
2013-2014	(Serbia) Nikola Matijašević	15	10-5	67%
2014-2017	(Serbia) Slobodan Boškan	38	25-13	66%
2017-	(Bosnia and Herzegovina) Veljko Bašić	38	21-17	55%

* Statistics correct as of end 2021 European Volleyball Championship.

== Official matches ==
Montenengro played its first official match in September 2007. There is a list of official matches of the Montenegro men's national volleyball team.

=== Opponents ===
Below is the list of performances of Montenegro men's national volleyball team against every opponent.

Opponents' country	Pld	W	L	Sets (W-L)
Albania	1	1	0	3-1
Azerbaijan	4	4	0	12-1
Bulgaria	1	0	1	0-3
Belarus	1	0	1	0-3
China	1	1	0	3-1
Chinese Taipei	2	1	1	4-4
Croatia	5	2	3	9-11
Cyprus	1	1	0	3-1
Czech Republic	6	3	3	11-15
Egypt	1	0	1	2-3
Estonia	8	2	6	12-20
Finland	2	0	2	2-6
Germany	5	1	4	3-14
Georgia	2	2	0	6-0
Greece	8	5	3	20-12
Hungary	7	6	1	17-5
Iceland	3	3	0	9-1
Italy	2	0	2	0-6
Kazakhstan	1	1	0	3-0
Kosovo	1	1	0	3-0
Latvia	2	2	0	6-3
Luxembourg	1	1	0	3-0
Macedonia	5	3	2	10-9
Mexico	2	2	0	6-2
Moldova	2	1	1	5-3
Monaco	1	1	0	3-0
Netherlands	3	1	2	4-8
Norway	2	2	0	6-0
Poland	5	3	2	9-11
Puerto Rico	2	2	0	6-1
Romania	7	3	4	13-13
Russia	1	0	1	0-3
San Marino	1	1	0	3-0
Slovakia	2	1	1	3-3
Slovenia	1	0	1	0-3
Spain	7	5	2	17-14
Switzerland	2	2	0	6-0
Tunisia	5	3	2	13-8
Turkey	3	1	2	5-7
Ukraine	2	0	2	2-6
Venezuela	1	0	1	2-3
Overall	119	68	51	244-205

* Statistics correct as of end 2021 European Volleyball Championship.

== Current squad ==
The following is the Montenegrin roster in the 2017 World League.

Head coach: Veljko Basić

No.	Name	Date of birth	Height	Weight	Spike	Block	2016–17 club
1	Aleksandar Minić	9 November 1986	2.05 m (6 ft 9 in)	103 kg (227 lb)	350 cm (140 in)	325 cm (128 in)	(Indonesia) Jakarta Pertamina Energi
2	Simo Dabović	9 April 1987	1.95 m (6 ft 5 in)	93 kg (205 lb)	345 cm (136 in)	335 cm (132 in)	(Iran) Sazman Omran Sari
3	Luka Babić	7 July 1994	2.11 m (6 ft 11 in)	105 kg (231 lb)	340 cm (130 in)	330 cm (130 in)	(Switzerland) Chênois Genève
4	Gojko Ćuk	10 October 1988	2.09 m (6 ft 10 in)	101 kg (223 lb)	347 cm (137 in)	325 cm (128 in)	(France) Nice
5	Rajko Strugar	11 April 1995	1.93 m (6 ft 4 in)	85 kg (187 lb)	335 cm (132 in)	325 cm (128 in)	(France) Tours
6	Vojin Ćaćić (C)	31 March 1990	2.03 m (6 ft 8 in)	101 kg (223 lb)	355 cm (140 in)	340 cm (130 in)	(Lebanon) Bauchrieh Club
7	Nikola Radonić	30 July 1994	1.91 m (6 ft 3 in)	78 kg (172 lb)	0 cm (0 in)	0 cm (0 in)	
8	Nikola Lakčević	14 July 1995	1.90 m (6 ft 3 in)	86 kg (190 lb)	330 cm (130 in)	310 cm (120 in)	(Montenegro) Budvanska Rivijera Budva
9	Marko Bojić	13 November 1988	2.01 m (6 ft 7 in)	88 kg (194 lb)	355 cm (140 in)	335 cm (132 in)	
10	Balša Radunović	12 August 1992	2.05 m (6 ft 9 in)	93 kg (205 lb)	350 cm (140 in)	330 cm (130 in)	(Spain) Teruel
11	Božidar Ćuk	16 June 1992	2.00 m (6 ft 7 in)	97 kg (214 lb)	355 cm (140 in)	330 cm (130 in)	(France) Stade Poitevin Poitiers
12	Slobodan Bojic	11 August 1992	2.00 m (6 ft 7 in)	95 kg (209 lb)	335 cm (132 in)	325 cm (128 in)	(Tunisia) Sfaxien
13	Bojan Strugar	30 June 1995	2.02 m (6 ft 8 in)	93 kg (205 lb)	330 cm (130 in)	325 cm (128 in)	(Italy) Top Volley Latina
14	Blažo Milić	22 November 1987	2.10 m (6 ft 11 in)	88 kg (194 lb)	345 cm (136 in)	335 cm (132 in)	(France) Narbonne
16	Marko Vukašinović	30 July 1993	1.96 m (6 ft 5 in)	88 kg (194 lb)	348 cm (137 in)	330 cm (130 in)	(Switzerland) Näfels
17	Ivan Ječmenica	17 March 1990	2.02 m (6 ft 8 in)	90 kg (200 lb)	350 cm (140 in)	340 cm (130 in)	(France) Cambrai
18	Miloš Ćulafić	13 August 1986	2.05 m (6 ft 9 in)	100 kg (220 lb)	360 cm (140 in)	340 cm (130 in)	(Iran) Sazman Omran Sari
19	Ljubomir Popović	14 November 1988	1.82 m (6 ft 0 in)	87 kg (192 lb)	300 cm (120 in)	295 cm (116 in)	(Montenegro) Jedinstvo Bijelo Polje

== See also ==
- List of official matches of the Montenegro men's national volleyball team
- Volleyball Federation of Montenegro (OSCG)
- Montenegrin Volleyball League
