= Marko Bojić =

Montenegrin volleyball player (born 1988)

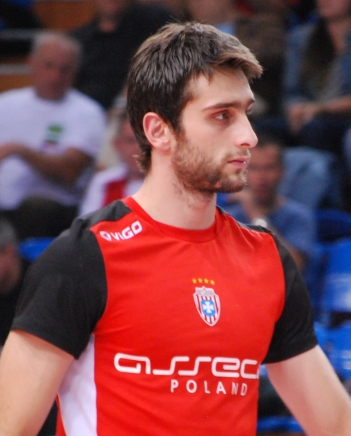

Personal information
- Nationality: Montenegro
- Born: 13 November 1988 (age 37); Nikšić
- Hometown: Nikšić
- Height: 201 cm (6 ft 7 in)
- Weight: 82 kg (181 lb)
- Spike: 350 cm (138 in)
- Block: 340 cm (134 in)

Volleyball information
- Current club: Yeni Kızıltepe Spor Kulubü
- Number: 9 (national team)

Career
Years	Teams
2005–2010; 2010–2011; 2011–2012; 2012–2013; 2013; 2013–2014; 2014; 2014–2015; 2015; 2015–2016; 2016–2017; 2017–2018; 2018–2019; 2019; 2019; 2019–2020; 2020–2021; 2021; 2021–	OK Budućnost Podgorica; P.A.O.K. Thessaloniki; Asseco Resovia Rzeszów; Tomis Constanța; Yaroslavich Yaroslavl; Simurg PİK; OK Budvanska Rivijera; Ziraat Bankası Ankara; Paris Volley; Palembang Bank Sumsel Babel; Halkbank Ankara; Ansan OK Savings Bank Rush & Cash; Al-Nasr; CS Arcada Galați; Sporting CP; OK Budva; Jiangsu Nanjing Mao Mao; Omonia Nicosia; Grand Nancy Volley-Ball; Yeni Kızıltepe Spor Kulubü

National team
2009–	Montenegro

Marko Bojić (born 13 November 1988) is a Montenegrin volleyball player. He is part of the Montenegro men's national volleyball team. On club level he plays for Yeni Kızıltepe Spor Kulubü.
