= Aleksandar Minić =

Montenegrin volleyball player (born 1986)

Personal information
- Nationality: Montenegro
- Born: 9 November 1986 (age 39)
- Height: 205 cm (6 ft 9 in)
- Weight: 103 kg (227 lb)
- Spike: 347 cm (137 in)
- Block: 340 cm (134 in)

Volleyball information
- Current club: Jakarta Pertamina Energi (IDN)
- Number: 1 (national team)

National team
| 2015– | Montenegro |

Aleksandar Minić (born 9 November 1986) is a Montenegrin male volleyball player. He is part of the Montenegro men's national volleyball team.
