= Simo Dabović =

Montenegrin volleyball player (born 1987)

Simo Dabovic

Personal information
- Nationality: Montenegro
- Born: 9 April 1987 (age 39)
- Height: 195 cm (6 ft 5 in)
- Weight: 93 kg (205 lb)
- Spike: 335 cm (132 in)
- Block: 335 cm (132 in)

Volleyball information
- Number: 2 (national team)

Career
Years	Teams
2015	Foinikas Syros

National team
2015	Montenegro

Simo Dabovic (born 9 April 1987) is a Montenegrin male volleyball player. He is part of the Montenegro men's national volleyball team. On club level he plays for Foinikas Syros.
