= Miloš Ćulafić =

Montenegrin volleyball player (born 1986)

Miloš Culafic
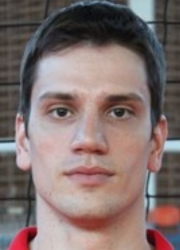

Personal information
- Nationality: Montenegro
- Born: 13 August 1986 (age 40)
- Height: 206 cm (6 ft 9 in)
- Weight: 101 kg (223 lb)
- Spike: 350 cm (138 in)
- Block: 340 cm (134 in)

Volleyball information
- Number: 18 (national team)

Career
Years	Teams
2013-2014; 2015	VC Lokomotyv Kharkiv; Sahinbey Belediye

National team
2014-	Montenegro

Miloš Ćulafić (born 13 August 1986) is a Montenegrin male volleyball player. He is part of the Montenegro men's national volleyball team. On club level he plays for OFI V.C in Greece.

== Clubs ==
- Budvanska Rivijera Budva (2008–2010)
- Suwon KEPCO 45 (2010–2011)
- Stade Poitevin Poitiers (2011–2012)
- VK Tioumen (2012–2013)
- Suwon KEPCO 45 (2013–2014)
- Budvanska Rivijera Budva (2014)
- Arago de Sète (2014–2016)
- Sazman Omran Sari (2016-)
