= Nikola Lakčević (volleyball) =

Montenegrin volleyball player (born 1995)

Personal information
- Nationality: Montenegro
- Born: 14 July 1995 (age 31)
- Height: 190 cm (6 ft 3 in)
- Weight: 89 kg (196 lb)
- Spike: 315 cm (124 in)
- Block: 305 cm (120 in)

Volleyball information
- Number: 8 (national team)

Career
Years	Teams
2015	Budvanska Rivijera

National team
2014-	Montenegro

Nikola Lakčević (born 14 July 1995) is a Montenegrin male volleyball player. He is part of the Montenegro men's national volleyball team. On club level he plays for Budvanska Rivijera.
