= Volleyball at the Mediterranean Games =

Volleyball has been played consistently at the Mediterranean Games since the year 1959 for men and since the year 1975 for women . The Italy men's national volleyball team are the most successful men's team and also the Italy women's national volleyball team is the most successful team for women.

== Men's tournaments ==
Year	Host	Gold medal game			Bronze medal game		
Year	Host	Gold medalist	Score	Silver medalist	Bronze medalist	Score	Fourth place
1959; Details	(Lebanon); Beirut	Italy		Turkey	Lebanon		United Arab Republic
1963; Details	(Italy); Naples	Yugoslavia		Italy	Turkey	3–0	United Arab Republic
1967; Details	(Tunisia); Tunis	Yugoslavia		France	Turkey	3–1	Lebanon
1971; Details	(Turkey); İzmir	Yugoslavia	3–0	Turkey	Greece		Tunisia
1975; Details	(Algeria); Algiers	Yugoslavia	3–0	Italy	France		Greece
1979; Details	(Socialist Federal Republic of Yugoslavia); Split	Yugoslavia		Greece	France		Italy
1983; Details	(Morocco); Casablanca	Italy		France	Greece		Yugoslavia
1987; Details	(Syria); Latakia	Spain	3–0	Turkey	Italy		Syria
1991; Details	(Greece); Athens	Italy		Yugoslavia	Spain		France
1993; Details	(France); Languedoc-Roussillon	France		Spain	Turkey		Greece
1997; Details	(Italy); Bari	France		Turkey	Croatia		Italy
2001; Details	(Tunisia); Tunis	Italy	3–1	Tunisia	Turkey	3–0	France
2005; Details	(Spain); Almería	Egypt	3–2	Spain	Serbia and Montenegro	3–0	Tunisia
2009; Details	(Italy); Pescara	Italy	3–1	Spain	Slovenia	3–0	Tunisia
2013; Details	(Turkey); Mersin	Italy	3–2	Tunisia	France	3–2	Turkey
2018; Details	(Spain); Tarragona	Italy	3–1	Spain	Greece	3–2	Egypt
2022; Details	(Algeria); Oran	Croatia	3–0	Spain	Italy	3–1	France
2026; Details	(Italy); Taranto	France	3-0	Greece	Italy	3-2	Turkey

=== Men's medals summary ===
Rank	Nation	Gold	Silver	Bronze	Total
1	Italy	7	2	3	12
2	Yugoslavia	5	1	0	6
3	France	3	2	3	8
4	Spain	1	5	1	7
5	Croatia	1	0	1	2
6	Egypt	1	0	0	1
7	Turkey	0	4	4	8
8	Greece	0	2	3	5
9	Tunisia	0	2	0	2
10	Lebanon	0	0	1	1
10	Serbia and Montenegro	0	0	1	1
10	Slovenia	0	0	1	1
Totals (12 entries)		18	18	18	54

== Women's tournaments ==
Year	Host	Gold medal game			Bronze medal game		
Year	Host	Gold medalist	Score	Silver medalist	Bronze medalist	Score	Fourth place
1975; Details	(Algeria); Algiers	Yugoslavia	3–2	Italy	Turkey	3–1	Egypt
1979; Details	(Socialist Federal Republic of Yugoslavia); Split	Italy		Yugoslavia	France		Turkey
1983; Details	(Morocco); Casablanca	Italy		France	Yugoslavia		Morocco
1987; Details	(Syria); Latakia	Albania	3–0	Turkey	Italy		Greece
1991; Details	(Greece); Athens	Italy	3–0	Turkey	Greece	3-0	Albania
1993; Details	(France); Languedoc-Roussillon	Croatia		France	Turkey		Greece
1997; Details	(Italy); Bari	Italy		Turkey	France		Yugoslavia
2001; Details	(Tunisia); Tunis	Italy	3–0	Turkey	France	3–1	Greece
2005; Details	(Spain); Almería	Turkey	3–0	Greece	Italy	3–1	Croatia
2009; Details	(Italy); Pescara	Italy	3–2	Turkey	Croatia	3–0	Greece
2013; Details	(Turkey); Mersin	Italy	3–1	Turkey	Croatia	3–2	Slovenia
2018; Details	(Spain); Tarragona	Croatia	3–1	Greece	Turkey	3–1	France
2022; Details	(Algeria); Oran	Italy	3–1	Turkey	Serbia	3–2	Spain
2026; Details	(Italy); Taranto	Turkey	3–0	Italy	Serbia	3–2	Greece

=== Women's medals summary ===
Rank	Nation	Gold	Silver	Bronze	Total
1	Italy	8	2	2	12
2	Turkey	2	7	3	12
3	Croatia	2	0	2	4
4	Yugoslavia	1	1	1	3
5	Albania	1	0	0	1
6	France	0	2	3	5
7	Greece	0	2	1	3
8	Serbia	0	0	2	2
Totals (8 entries)		14	14	14	42

== All-time medal table ==
Rank	Nation	Gold	Silver	Bronze	Total
1	Italy	15	3	4	22
2	Yugoslavia	6	2	1	9
3	France	3	4	6	13
4	Croatia	3	0	3	6
5	Turkey	2	11	7	20
6	Spain	1	5	1	7
7	Albania	1	0	0	1
7	Egypt	1	0	0	1
9	Greece	0	3	4	7
10	Tunisia	0	2	0	2
11	Lebanon	0	0	1	1
11	Serbia	0	0	1	1
11	Serbia and Montenegro	0	0	1	1
11	Slovenia	0	0	1	1
Totals (14 entries)		32	30	30	92

== See also ==
- Volleyball at the Summer Olympics
- Volleyball at the Summer Universiade
