= Yugoslavia at the 1980 Summer Olympics =

- Flag of SFR Yugoslavia
- IOC code: YUG
- NOC: Yugoslav Olympic Committee

in Moscow
- Competitors: 164 (135 men, 28 women) in 17 sports
- Flag bearer: Matija Ljubek
- Medals Ranked 14th: Gold 2 Silver 3 Bronze 4 Total 9

Summer Olympics appearances (overview)
- 1920; 1924; 1928; 1932; 1936; 1948; 1952; 1956; 1960; 1964; 1968; 1972; 1976; 1980; 1984; 1988; 1992; 1996; 2000

Other related appearances
- Serbia (1912, 2008–pres.); Croatia (1992–pres.); Slovenia (1992–pres.); Bosnia and Herzegovina (1992 S–pres.); Independent Olympic Participants (1992 S); North Macedonia (1996–pres.); Serbia and Montenegro (1996–2006); Montenegro (2008–pres.); Kosovo (2016–pres.)

Athletes from the Socialist Federal Republic of Yugoslavia competed at the 1980 Summer Olympics in Moscow, USSR. 164 competitors, 135 men and 28 women, took part in 69 events in 17 sports.

== Medalists ==
Medal	Name	Sport	Event
Gold	Slobodan Kačar	Boxing	Men's Light Heavyweight
Gold	Andro Knego; Branko Skroče; Dragan Kićanović; Dražen Dalipagić; Duje Krstulović; Krešimir Ćosić; Mihovil Nakić; Mirza Delibašić; Rajko Žižić; Ratko Radovanović; Željko Jerkov; Zoran Slavnić	Basketball	Men's Team Competition
Silver	Zoran Pančić; Milorad Stanulov	Rowing	Men's Double Sculls
Silver	Radmila Drljača; Katica Iles; Slavica Jeremić; Vesna Milošević; Vesna Radović; Rada Savić; Ana Titlić; Zorica Vojinović; Mirjana Ognjenović; Biserka Višnjić; Svetlana Anastasowski; Svetlana Dasić-Kitić; Mirjana Durica; Jasna Kolar-Merdan	Handball	Women's Team Competition
Silver	Zoran Roje; Milorad Krivokapić; Zoran Gopčević; Boško Lozica; Predrag Manojlović; Zoran Mustur; Milivoj Bebić; Damir Polić; Ratko Rudić; Slobodan Trifunović; Luka Vezilić	Water Polo	Men's Team Competition
Bronze	Radomir Kovačević	Judo	Men's Heavyweight
Bronze	Shaban Sejdiu	Wrestling	Men's Freestyle Lightweight
Bronze	Zlatko Celent; Duško Mrduljaš; Josip Reić	Rowing	Men's Coxed Pairs
Bronze	Mersada Bećirspahić; Mira Bjedov; Vesna Despotović; Vera Đurašković; Zorica Đurković; Jelica Komnenović; Biljana Majstorović; Vukica Mitić; Sanja Ožegović; Sofija Pekić; Jasmina Perazić; Marija Tonković	Basketball	Women's Team Competition

== Archery ==
In the second time the nation competed in Olympic archery, Yugoslavia again entered only one man. He came in eleventh place, missing a top eight finish by eight points.

Men's Individual Competition:

- Zoran Matković – 2410 points (11th place)

== Athletics ==
Men's 200 metres

- Aleksandar Popović
  - Heat – 21.65
  - Quarterfinals – 21.66 (→ did not advance)

Men's 400 metres

- Josip Alebić
  - Heat – 47.61
  - Quarterfinals – 46.60 (→ did not advance)

Men's 800 metres

- Milovan Savić
  - Heat – 1:49.2
  - Semifinals – 1:47.6 (→ did not advance)

Men's 1,500 metres

- Dragan Zdravković
  - Heat – 3:44.0
  - Semifinals – 3:43.4
  - Final – 3:43.1 (→ 9th place)

Men's 4x400 metres Relay

- Zeijko Knapić, Milovan Savić, Rok Kopitar, and Josip Alebić
  - Heat – 3:05.3 (→ did not advance)

Men's 110 m Hurdles

- Borisav Pisić
  - Heat – 14.13
  - Semifinals – 14.16 (→ did not advance)
- Petar Vukičević
  - Heat – 14.19
  - Semifinals – 14.12 (→ did not advance)

Men's 400 m Hurdles

- Rok Kopitar
  - Heat – 50.34
  - Semifinals – 50.55
  - Final – 49.67 (→ 5th place)

Men's High Jump

- Vaso Komnenić
  - Qualification – 2.21 m
  - Final – 2.24 m (→ 6th place)

Men's Long Jump

- Nenad Stekić
  - Qualification – 5.75 m (→ did not advance)

Men's Triple Jump

- Milan Spasojević
  - Qualification – 16.48 m
  - Final – 16.09 m (→ 10th place)

Men's Shot Put

- Vladimir Milic
  - Qualification – 20.56 m
  - Final – 20.07 m (→ 8th place)

Women's 1,500 metres

- Breda Pergar
  - Heat – 4:13.2 (→ did not advance)

Women's High Jump

- Lidija Benedetič
  - Qualification – 1.80 m (→ did not advance)

== Boxing ==
Men's Bantamweight (– 54 kg)

- Fazlija Sacirović
  1. First Round – Bye
  2. Second Round – Lost to Veli Koota (Finland) after referee stopped contest in second round

Men's Featherweight (– 57 kg)

- Dejan Marović
  1. First Round – Bye
  2. Second Round – Defeated Miroslav Šandor (Czechoslovakia) on points (5–0)
  3. Third Round – Lost to Krzysztof Kosedowski (Poland) on points (1–4)

Men's Lightweight (– 60 kg)

- Geza Tumbas
  1. First Round – Defeated Norman Stevens (Australia) on points (4–1)
  2. Second Round – Lost to Angel Herrera (Cuba) on points (0–5)

Men's Light-Welterweight (– 63,5 kg)

- Ace Rusevski
  1. First Round – Defeated Margarit Anastasov (Bulgaria) on points (4–1)
  2. Second Round – Defeated Boualem Bel Alouane (Algeria) on points (5–0)
  3. Quarter Finals – Lost to Patrizio Oliva (Italy) on points (2–3)

Men's Heavyweight (+ 81 kg)

- Aziz Salihu
  1. First Round – Lost to Piotr Zaev (Soviet Union) on points (0–5)

== Cycling ==
Four cyclists represented Yugoslavia in 1980.

Individual road race

- Bruno Bulić
- Vinko Polončič
- Bojan Ropret
- Bojan Udovič

Team time trial

- Bruno Bulić
- Vinko Polončič
- Bojan Ropret
- Bojan Udovič

== Football ==
=== Men's team competition ===
PRELIMINARY ROUND (GROUP D)

July 21, 1980
Yugoslavia – Finland 2–0 (0–0) Dinamo Stadium, Minsk

July 23, 1980
Yugoslavia – Costa Rica 3–2 (2–1) Dinamo Stadium, Minsk

July 25, 1980
Yugoslavia – Iraq 1–1 (0–0) Dinamo Stadium, Minsk

FINAL STANDINGS GROUP D:

1. Yugoslavia          3 2 1 0 ( 6- 3) 5 *
2. Iraq                3 1 2 0 ( 4- 1) 4 *
3. Finland             3 1 1 1 ( 3- 2) 3
4. Costa Rica          3 0 0 3 ( 2- 9) 0

* Qualified for quarter-finals

QUARTER-FINALS

July 27, 1980
Yugoslavia – Algeria 3–0 (2–0) Dinamo Stadium, Minsk

SEMI-FINALS

July 29, 1980
Czechoslovakia – Yugoslavia 2–0 (2–0) Dynamo Stadium, Moscow

BRONZE MEDAL GAME

August 1, 1980 
Yugoslavia – Soviet Union 0–2 (0–0) Dynamo Stadium, Moscow

- Team Roster
  - Dragan Pantelić
  - Nikica Cukrov
  - Ivan Gudelj
  - Miloš Hrstić
  - Milan Jovin
  - Nikica Klinčarski
  - Mišo Krstičević
  - Dževad Šećerbegović
  - Vladimir Matijević
  - Ante Miročević
  - Dušan Pešić
  - Tomislav Ivković
  - Boro Primorac
  - Srebrenko Repčić
  - Miloš Šestić
  - Zlatko Vujović
  - Zoran Vujović

== Handball ==
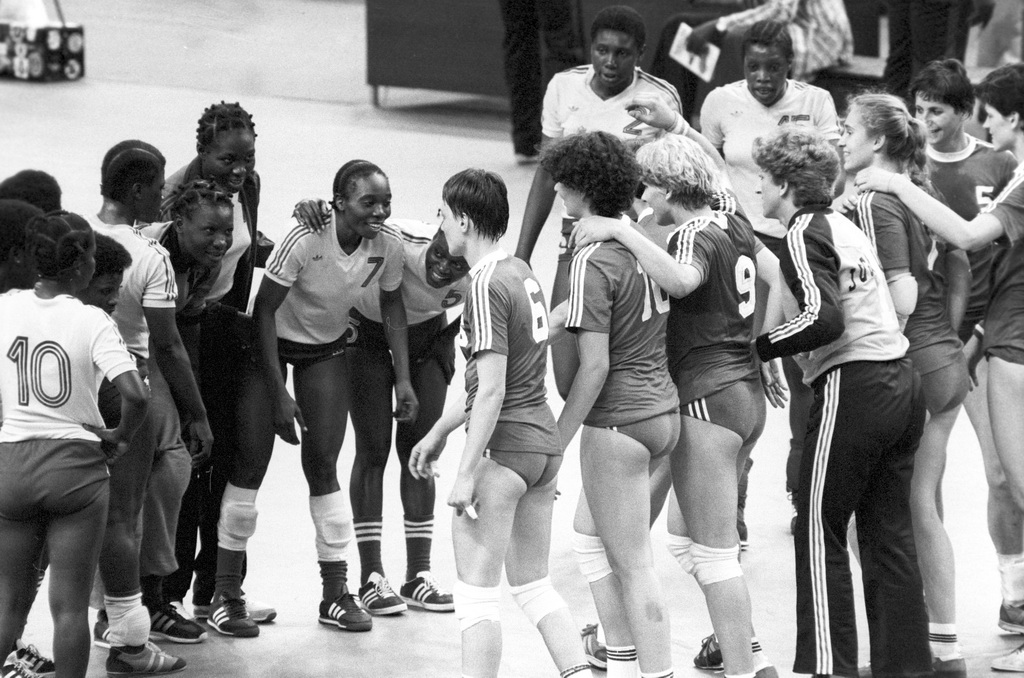
The Yugoslav women's handball team facing off against DR Congo's.

=== Men's team competition ===
- Preliminary Round (Group B)
  - Defeated Algeria (22–18)
  - Defeated Switzerland (26–21)
  - Defeated Romania (23–21)
  - Defeated Kuwait (44–10)
  - Lost to Soviet Union (17–22)
- Classification Match
  - 5th/6th place: Lost to Spain (23–24) → 6th place
- Team Roster
  - Zlatan Arnautović
  - Momir Rnic
  - Enver Koso
  - Drago Jovović
  - Stjepan Obran
  - Jasmin Mrkonja
  - Petar Mahne
  - Pavel Jurina
  - Goran Nerić
  - Jovica Cvetković
  - Velibor Nenadić
  - Adnan Dizdar
  - Mile Isaković
  - Jovica Elezović

== Judo ==
Men's Heavyweight

- Radomir Kovacevic
  - Bronze medal

== Rowing ==
Men's double sculls

- Zoran Pančić, Milorad Stanulov ( Silver)

Men's quadruple sculls

- Milan Arežina, Darko Zibar, Dragan Obradović, Nikola Stefanović (6th)

Men's coxed pairs

- Duško Mrduljaš, Zlatko Celent, Josip Reić ( Bronze)

Men's coxed fours

- Milan Ćulibrk, Vladimir Krstić, Božidar Đorđević, Dušan Kovačević, Saša Mimić (10th)

== Sailing ==
Men's Flying Dutchman

- Danko Mandić
  - Final standing – 9th place
- Zoran Kalebić
  - Final standing – 9th place

Men's Finn class

- Minski Fabras
  - Final standing – 11th place

== Swimming ==
Men's 200m Freestyle

- Borut Petrič
  - Final – 1.56,51 (→ did not advance)

Men's 1.500m Freestyle

- Borut Petrič
  - Final – 15.21,78 (→ 5th place)

== Volleyball ==
=== Men's team competition ===
- Preliminary Round (Group B)
  - Lost to Poland (1–3)
  - Defeated Brazil (3–2)
  - Lost to Romania (1–3)
  - Defeated Libya (3–0)
- Classification Matches
  - 5th/8th place: Defeated Cuba (3–2)
  - 5th/6th place: Lost to Brazil (2–3) → 6th place
- Team Roster
  - Vladimir Bogoevski
  - Vladimir Trifunović
  - Aleksandar Tacevski
  - Zdravko Kuljić
  - Goran Srbinovski
  - Slobodan Lozančić
  - Ivica Jelić
  - Boro Jović
  - Radovan Malević
  - Miodrag Mitić
  - Ljubomir Travica
  - Mladen Kašić

== Water polo ==
=== Men's team competition ===
- Preliminary Round (Group C)
  - Drew with Cuba (6–6)
  - Defeated Bulgaria (9–2)
  - Defeated Australia (9–2)
- Final Round (Group A)
  - Drew with Cuba (7–7)
  - Defeated Hungary (8–7)
  - Defeated Netherlands (5–4)
  - Defeated Spain (7–6)
  - Lost to Soviet Union (7–8) → Silver Medal
- Team Roster
  - Luka Vezilić
  - Zoran Gopcević
  - Damir Polić
  - Ratko Rudić
  - Zoran Mustur
  - Zoran Roje
  - Milivoj Bebić
  - Slobodan Trifunović
  - Boško Lozica
  - Predrag Manojlović
  - Milorad Krivokapić
