= Yugoslavia men's national volleyball team =

Former national sports team

Yugoslavia (Socialist Federal Republic of Yugoslavia)
- Association: Volleyball Federation of Yugoslavia
- Confederation: CEV
- FIVB ranking: NR (1 October 2026)

Uniforms
Home	Away

Summer Olympics
- Appearances: 1

Yugoslavia men's national volleyball team
Medal record

Men's volleyball

Representing Yugoslavia

European Championship
Bronze medal – third place	1975 Yugoslavia	
Bronze medal – third place	1979 France	

Mediterranean Games
Gold medal – first place	1963 Naples	
Gold medal – first place	1967 Tunis	
Gold medal – first place	1971 İzmir	
Gold medal – first place	1975 Algiers	
Gold medal – first place	1979 Split	
Silver medal – second place	1991 Athens	

The Yugoslavia men's national volleyball team was the national team of Socialist Federal Republic of Yugoslavia.

== History ==
Yugoslav Volleyball Federation was founded in 1946 by the Alliance for Physical Education of Yugoslavia. In 1947, the International Volleyball Federation FIVB was founded and Yugoslavia was one of the 14 founders. From 13 February 1949, the Volleyball Federation became an independent sports organization. Many years later, at the European Championships held in Belgrade, Yugoslav volleyball team won the bronze medal for the first time. That was in 1975, when Yugoslavia for the first time in history hosted the biggest European competition, both the men's and women's events. Yugoslav team in the last match of the final group defeated Bulgaria in Belgrade and won the bronze medal.

== Results ==
=== Olympic Games ===
Games	Round	Position	Pld	W	L	SF	SA	RT	Squad
(Japan) 1964 Tokyo	did not qualify								
1968 Mexico City	did not qualify								
(West Germany) 1972 Munich	did not qualify								
(Japan) 1976 Montreal	did not qualify								
(Soviet Union) 1980 Moscow	Preliminary Round	6th	6	3	3	13	13	1.000	Squad
(United States) 1984 Los Angeles	did not qualify								
(South Korea) 1988 Seoul	did not qualify								
Total	1/7	0 Title	6	3	3	13	13	1.000	

=== World Championship ===
Games	Round	Position	Pld	W	L	SF	SA	RT	Squad
(Czechoslovakia) 1949	did not qualify								
(Soviet Union) 1952	did not qualify								
(France) 1956	Final Group	10th	9	1	8	11	26	0.423	
(Brazil) 1960	did not qualify								
(Soviet Union) 1962	Final Group	8th	9	2	7	17	22	0.773	
(Czechoslovakia) 1966	Final Group	8th	7	0	7	6	21	0.286	
(Bulgaria) 1970	Preliminary Round	10th	11	7	4	22	19	1.158	
(Mexico) 1974	did not qualify								
(Italy) 1978	did not qualify								
(Argentina) 1982	did not qualify								
(France) 1986	did not qualify								
(Brazil) 1990	did not qualify								
Total	4/12	0 Titles	36	10	26	56	88	0.636	

=== European Championship ===
Year	Round	Position	Pld	W	L	SW	SL
(Italy) 1948	did not qualify						
(Bulgaria) 1950	did not qualify						
(France) 1951	Final Round	5th	8	4	4	15	14
(Romania) 1955	Final Round	5th	10	5	5	21	19
(Czechoslovakia) 1958	Final Round	7th	11	5	6	21	21
(Romania) 1963	Final Round	7th	9	3	6	13	21
(Turkey) 1967	Final Round	7th	10	4	6	14	19
(Italy) 1971	Preliminary Round	11th	8	3	5	14	15
(Socialist Federal Republic of Yugoslavia) 1975	Final Round	Bronze medal	7	5	2	17	12
(Finland) 1977	Preliminary Round	7th	7	3	4	10	13
(France) 1979	Final Round	Bronze medal	7	5	2	17	10
(Bulgaria) 1981	Preliminary Round	10th	7	2	5	10	15
(East Germany) 1983	did not qualify						
(Netherlands) 1985	Preliminary Round	11th	7	1	6	5	19
(Belgium) 1987	Preliminary Round	8th	7	2	5	8	17
(Sweden) 1989	Preliminary Round	8th	7	3	4	12	17
(Germany) 1991	Preliminary Round	6th	7	3	4	14	15
Total	Qualified: 14/17		112	48	64	191	227

=== World Cup ===
- 1965 — 8th place
- 1969–1991 — did not qualify

=== World League ===
- 1990 — did not qualify
- 1991 — did not qualify

=== Mediterranean Games ===
Year	Round	Position	Pld	W	L	SW	SL
(Italy) 1963	Winners	1st place, gold medalist(s)	/	/	/	/	/
(Tunisia) 1967	Winners	1st place, gold medalist(s)	/	/	/	/	/
(Turkey) 1971	Winners	1st place, gold medalist(s)	/	/	/	/	/
(Algeria) 1975	Winners	1st place, gold medalist(s)	/	/	/	/	/
(Socialist Federal Republic of Yugoslavia) 1979	Winners	1st place, gold medalist(s)	/	/	/	/	/
(Morocco) 1983	Semifinals	4th	/	/	/	/	/
(Syria) 1987	Didn't Participate		/	/	/	/	/
(Greece) 1991	Second	2nd place, silver medalist(s)	/	/	/	/	/

== Notable Squads ==
1975 European Championship

- Miloš Grbić, Miodrag Gvozdenović, Nikola Matijašević, Vinko Dobrić, Laslo Lukač, Aleksandar Boričić, Vladimir Bogoevski, Vladimir Bošnjak, Ivica Jelić, Slobodan Lozančić, Mirsad Elezović, Živojin Vračarić, coach: Lazar Grozdanović

1979 European Championship

- Ljubomir Travica, Goran Srbinovski, Slobodan Lozančić, Vladimir Trifunović, Miodrag Mitić, Aleksandar Tasevski, Radovan Malević, Boro Jović, Vladimir Bogoevski, Vinko Dobrić, Zdravko Kuljić, Dragan Nišić, coach: Drago Tomić

1980 Olympic Games

- Vladimir Bogoevski, Ivica Jelić, Boro Jović, Mladen Kašić, Zdravko Kuljić, Slobodan Lozančić, Radovan Malević, Miodrag Mitić, Goran Srbinovski, Aleksandar Tasevski, Ljubomir Travica, Vladimir Trifunović

== See also ==
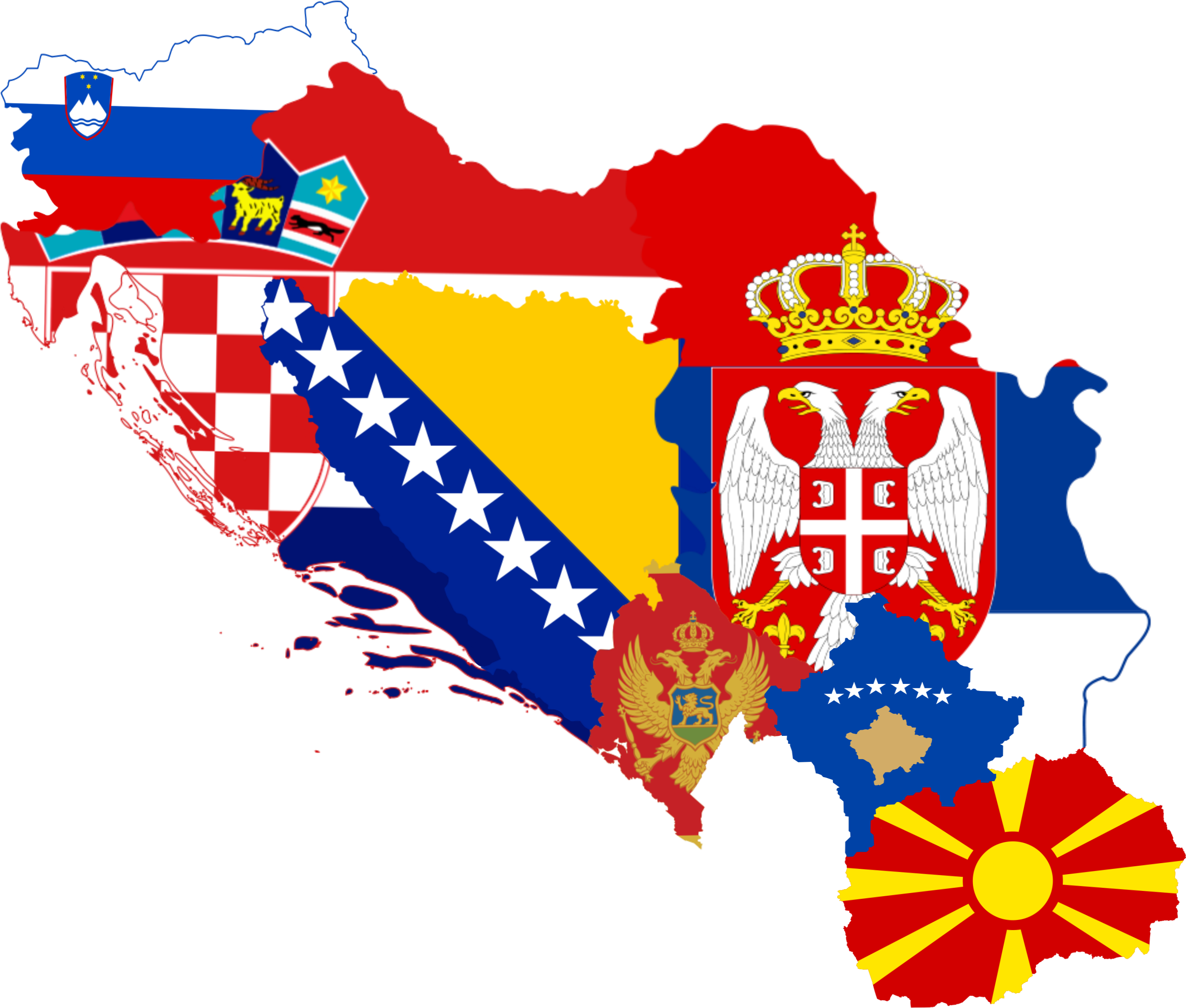

- Bosnia and Herzegovina men's national volleyball team
- Croatia men's national volleyball team
- Kosovo men's national volleyball team
- Montenegro men's national volleyball team
- North Macedonia men's national volleyball team
- Serbia men's national volleyball team
- Serbia women's national volleyball team
- Slovenia men's national volleyball team
- Yugoslavia women's national volleyball team

=== Former notable players ===
- (Socialist Federal Republic of Yugoslavia) Ivica Jelić
- (Socialist Federal Republic of Yugoslavia) Vladimir Janković
- (Socialist Federal Republic of Yugoslavia) Miloš Grbić
- (Socialist Federal Republic of Yugoslavia) Miodrag Gvozdenović
- (Socialist Federal Republic of Yugoslavia) Laslo Lukač
- (Socialist Federal Republic of Yugoslavia) Vladimir Trifunović
- (Socialist Federal Republic of Yugoslavia) Slavko Balandžić
- (Socialist Federal Republic of Yugoslavia) Orhan Arslanagić
- (Socialist Federal Republic of Yugoslavia) Mirsad Imširović
- (Socialist Federal Republic of Yugoslavia) Slobodan Boškan
- (Socialist Federal Republic of Yugoslavia) Toni Stipaničev
