= Syria men's national volleyball team =

National sports team

Syria
- Nickname(s): Nosour Qasioun (Arabic: نسور قاسيون, lit. 'Qasioun Eagles')
- Association: Syrian Arab Volleyball Federation (SAVF)
- Confederation: AVC
- FIVB ranking: NR (5 October 2025)

Uniforms
Home	Away

World Championship
- Appearances: none

World Cup
- Appearances: none

Asian Championship
- Appearances: 1 (First in 1979)
- Best result: 10th (1979)
- Official website

Syria men's national volleyball team
Medal record

Arab Championship
Silver medal – second place	1980 Damascus	Team
Silver medal – second place	1992 Damascus	Team

Pan Arab Games
Silver medal – second place	1965 Cairo	Team
Bronze medal – third place	1957 Beirut	Team
Bronze medal – third place	1992 Damascus	Team

The Syrian men's national volleyball team (Arabic: منتخب سوريا للكرة الطائرة رجال) represents Syria in international volleyball competitions and friendly matches. On 27 July 2022, the team was ranked 143rd in the world.

== Competition record ==
=== Asian Championship ===
Year	Rank	Pld	W	L	SW	SL	PW	PL
(Australia) 1975	Did not enter							
(Bahrain) 1979	10th place	2	3	5	8	10	68	112
(Japan) 1983	Did not enter							
(Kuwait) 1987	Did not enter							
(South Korea) 1989	Did not enter							
(Australia) 1991	Did not enter							
(Thailand) 1993	Did not enter							
(South Korea) 1995	Did not enter							
(Qatar) 1997	Did not enter							
(Iran) 1999	Did not enter							
(South Korea) 2001	Did not enter							
(China) 2003	Did not enter							
(Thailand) 2005	Did not enter							
(Indonesia) 2007	Did not enter							
(Philippines) 2009	Did not enter							
(Iran) 2011	Did not enter							
(United Arab Emirates) 2013	Did not enter							
(Iran) 2015	Did not enter							
(Indonesia) 2017	Did not enter							
(Iran) 2019	Did not enter							
(Japan) 2021	Did not enter							
Total	1/19	2	3	5	8	10	68	112

=== AVC Cup for Men ===
- Did not participate

=== AVC Challenge Cup ===
- Did not participate

=== Arab Championship ===
- 1980: (silver)
- 1992: (silver)

=== Afro-Arab Volleyball Friendship Cup ===
- 1981: 5th - 10th place

=== Asian games ===
- Did not qualify

=== West Asian Games ===
Year	Rank	Pld	W	L
(Iran) 1997	Did not qualify			
(Kuwait) 2002	3rd place	10	6	4
(Qatar) 2005	6th place	–	–	–
Total	2/3	10	6	4

=== Mediterranean Games ===
Year	Rank	Pld	W	L	SW	SL	PW	PL
(Lebanon) 1959	Part of United Arab Republic							
(Italy) 1963	Did not qualify							
(Tunisia) 1967	Did not qualify							
(Turkey) 1971	6th place	–	–	–	–	–	–	–
(Algeria) 1975	Did not qualify							
(Socialist Federal Republic of Yugoslavia) 1979	Did not qualify							
(Morocco) 1983	Did not qualify							
(Syria) 1987	4th place	–	–	–	–	–	–	–
(Greece) 1991	Did not qualify							
(France) 1993	Did not qualify							
(Italy) 1997	Did not qualify							
(Tunisia) 2001	Did not qualify							
(Spain) 2005	Did not qualify							
(Italy) 2009	Did not qualify							
(Turkey) 2013	Did not qualify							
(Spain) 2018	Did not qualify							
Total	2/16	-	-	-	-	-	-	-

=== Pan Arab Games ===
Year	Rank	Pld	W	L	SW	SL	PW	PL
(Lebanon) 1957	3rd place	–	–	–	–	–	–	–
(Morocco) 1961	Championship cancelled							
(United Arab Republic) 1965	Runners-up	–	–	–	–	–	–	–
(Syria) 1976	Championship cancelled							
(Morocco) 1985	Did not enter							
(Syria) 1992	3rd place	–	–	–	–	–	–	–
(Lebanon) 1997	Did not enter							
(Jordan) 1999	Did not enter							
(Algeria) 2004	Did not enter							
(Egypt) 2007	Did not enter							
(Qatar) 2011	Did not enter							
Total	3/11	-	-	-	-	-	-	-

=== Islamic Solidarity Games ===
Year	Rank	Pld	W	L	SW	SL	PW	PL
(Saudi Arabia) 2005	10th place	5	1	3	5	11	–	–
(Indonesia) 2013	Did not qualify							
(Azerbaijan) 2017	Did not qualify							
Total	1/3	5	1	3	5	11	-	-

== See also ==
- Syria women's national volleyball team
