= Spain women's national volleyball team =

Women's national volleyball team representing Spain

Spain
- Association: Real Federación Española de Voleibol
- Confederation: CEV
- Head coach: Pascual Saurin
- FIVB ranking: 31 ▼1 (24 May 2026)

Uniforms
| Home | Away |

Summer Olympics
- Appearances: 1 (First in 1992)
- Best result: 8th place (1992)

World Championship
- Appearances: 2 (First in 1982)
- Best result: 18th place (2025)
- Website

The Spain women's national volleyball team represents Spain in international women's volleyball competitions and friendly matches.

== Results ==
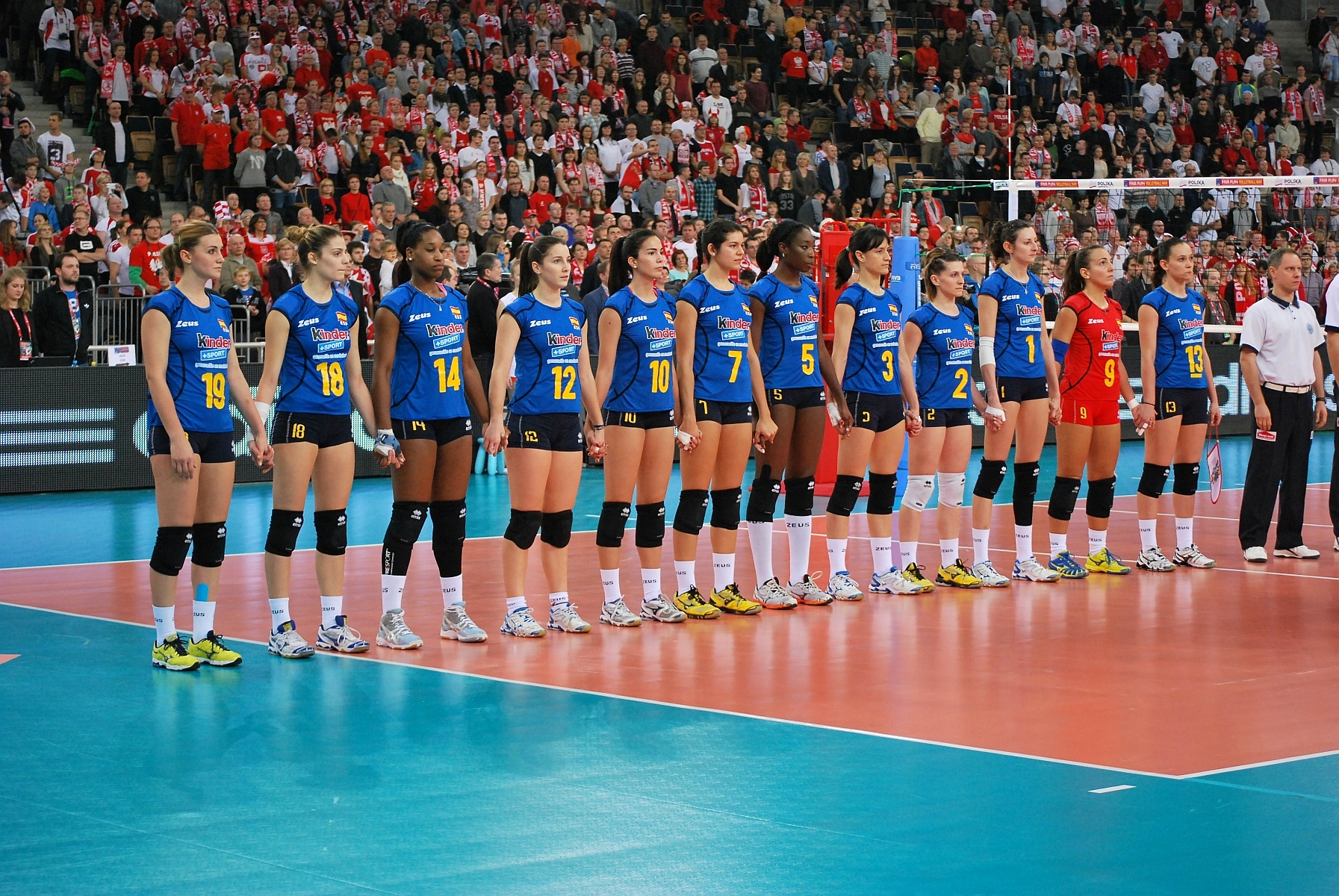
Spain volleyball women national team at the FIVB World Championship European Qualification Women in January 2014

=== Summer Olympics ===
Summer Olympics record
| Year | Round | Position | Pld | W | L | SW | SL | Squad |
|---|---|---|---|---|---|---|---|---|
| (Japan) 1964 | did not qualify | | | | | | | |
| (Mexico) 1968 | did not qualify | | | | | | | |
| (West Germany) 1972 | did not qualify | | | | | | | |
| (Canada) 1976 | did not qualify | | | | | | | |
| (Soviet Union) 1980 | did not qualify | | | | | | | |
| (United States) 1984 | did not qualify | | | | | | | |
| (South Korea) 1988 | did not qualify | | | | | | | |
| (Spain) 1992 | Preliminary Round | 8th Place | 4 | 0 | 4 | 0 | 12 | Squad |
| (United States) 1996 | did not qualify | | | | | | | |
| (Australia) 2000 | did not qualify | | | | | | | |
| (Greece) 2004 | did not qualify | | | | | | | |
| (China) 2008 | did not qualify | | | | | | | |
| (United Kingdom) 2012 | did not qualify | | | | | | | |
| (Brazil) 2016 | did not qualify | | | | | | | |
| (Japan) 2020 | did not qualify | | | | | | | |
| (France) 2024 | did not qualify | | | | | | | |
| (United States) 2028 | to be determined | | | | | | | |
| (Australia) 2032 | to be determined | | | | | | | |
| Total | 0 Titles | 1/17 | 4 | 0 | 4 | 0 | 12 | |

=== World Championship ===
Champions Runners up Third place Fourth place

World Championship record
| Year | Round | Position | Pld | W | L | SW | SL | Squad |
|---|---|---|---|---|---|---|---|---|
| (Soviet Union) 1952 | did not enter | | | | | | | |
| (France) 1956 | did not enter | | | | | | | |
| (Brazil) 1960 | did not enter | | | | | | | |
| (Soviet Union) 1962 | did not enter | | | | | | | |
| (Japan) 1967 | did not enter | | | | | | | |
| (Bulgaria) 1970 | did not qualify | | | | | | | |
| (Mexico) 1974 | did not qualify | | | | | | | |
| (Soviet Union) 1978 | did not qualify | | | | | | | |
| (Peru) 1982 | First Round | 20th Place | 9 | 2 | 7 | 10 | 21 | Squad |
| (Czechoslovakia) 1986 | did not qualify | | | | | | | |
| (China) 1990 | did not qualify | | | | | | | |
| (Brazil) 1994 | did not qualify | | | | | | | |
| (Japan) 1998 | did not qualify | | | | | | | |
| (Germany) 2002 | did not qualify | | | | | | | |
| (Japan) 2006 | did not qualify | | | | | | | |
| (Japan) 2010 | did not qualify | | | | | | | |
| (Italy) 2014 | did not qualify | | | | | | | |
| (Japan) 2018 | did not qualify | | | | | | | |
| (Netherlands) (Poland) 2022 | did not qualify | | | | | | | |
| (Thailand) 2025 | Preliminary Round | 18th Place | 3 | 1 | 2 | 5 | 7 | Squad |
| (Canada) / (United States) 2027 | to be determined | | | | | | | |
| (Philippines) 2029 | to be determined | | | | | | | |
| Total | 0 Title | 2/22 | 12 | 3 | 9 | 15 | 28 | |

=== World Cup ===
Champions Runners up Third place Fourth place

World Cup record
| Year | Round | Position | Pld | W | L | SW | SL | Squad |
|---|---|---|---|---|---|---|---|---|
| (Uruguay) 1973 | did not qualify | | | | | | | |
| (Japan) 1977 | did not qualify | | | | | | | |
| (Japan) 1981 | did not qualify | | | | | | | |
| (Japan) 1985 | did not qualify | | | | | | | |
| (Japan) 1989 | did not qualify | | | | | | | |
| (Japan) 1991 | First Round | 11th Place | 8 | 1 | 7 | 4 | 21 | Squad |
| (Japan) 1995 | did not qualify | | | | | | | |
| (Japan) 1999 | did not qualify | | | | | | | |
| (Japan) 2003 | did not qualify | | | | | | | |
| (Japan) 2007 | did not qualify | | | | | | | |
| (Japan) 2011 | did not qualify | | | | | | | |
| (Japan) 2015 | did not qualify | | | | | | | |
| (Japan) 2019 | did not qualify | | | | | | | |
| Total | 0 Titles | 1/13 | 8 | 1 | 7 | 4 | 21 | |

=== European Championship ===
Champions Runners up Third place Fourth place

European Championship record
| Year | Round | Position | Pld | W | L | SW | SL | Squad |
|---|---|---|---|---|---|---|---|---|
| (Czechoslovakia) 1949 | did not enter | | | | | | | |
| (Bulgaria) 1950 | did not enter | | | | | | | |
| (France) 1951 | did not qualify | | | | | | | |
| (Romania) 1955 | did not qualify | | | | | | | |
| (Czechoslovakia) 1958 | did not qualify | | | | | | | |
| (Romania) 1963 | did not qualify | | | | | | | |
| (Turkey) 1967 | did not qualify | | | | | | | |
| (Italy) 1971 | did not qualify | | | | | | | |
| (Socialist Federal Republic of Yugoslavia) 1975 | did not qualify | | | | | | | |
| (Finland) 1977 | did not qualify | | | | | | | |
| (France) 1979 | did not qualify | | | | | | | |
| (Bulgaria) 1981 | did not qualify | | | | | | | |
| (East Germany) 1983 | did not qualify | | | | | | | |
| (Netherlands) 1985 | did not qualify | | | | | | | |
| (Belgium) 1987 | did not qualify | | | | | | | |
| (West Germany) 1989 | did not qualify | | | | | | | |
| (Italy) 1991 | did not qualify | | | | | | | |
| (Czech Republic) 1993 | did not qualify | | | | | | | |
| (Netherlands) 1995 | did not qualify | | | | | | | |
| (Czech Republic) 1997 | did not qualify | | | | | | | |
| (Italy) 1999 | did not qualify | | | | | | | |
| (Bulgaria) 2001 | did not qualify | | | | | | | |
| (Turkey) 2003 | did not qualify | | | | | | | |
| (Croatia) 2005 | Preliminary round | 12th | 5 | 0 | 5 | 1 | 15 | Squad |
| (Belgium) / (Luxembourg) 2007 | Preliminary round | 15th | 3 | 0 | 3 | 2 | 9 | Squad |
| (Poland) 2009 | Playoffs | 9th | 6 | 2 | 4 | 10 | 16 | Squad |
| (Italy) / (Serbia) 2011 | Playoffs | 11th | 4 | 1 | 3 | 4 | 9 | Squad |
| (Germany) / (Switzerland) 2013 | Preliminary round | 16th | 3 | 0 | 3 | 0 | 9 | Squad |
| (Netherlands) / (Belgium) 2015 | did not qualify | | | | | | | |
| (Azerbaijan) / (Georgia (country)) 2017 | did not qualify | | | | | | | |
| (Slovakia) / (Hungary) / (Poland) / (Turkey) 2019 | Round of 16 | 15th | 6 | 2 | 4 | 7 | 15 | Squad |
| (Serbia) / (Bulgaria) / (Croatia) / (Romania) 2021 | Preliminary round | 20th | 5 | 1 | 4 | 4 | 14 | Squad |
| (Belgium) / (Italy) / (Estonia) / (Germany) 2023 | Round of 16 | 13th | 6 | 2 | 4 | 8 | 14 | Squad |
| (Azerbaijan) / (Czech Republic) / (Sweden) / (Turkey) 2026 | Preliminary round | 21st | 5 | 0 | 5 | 3 | 15 | Squad |
| (Slovakia) / (Spain) / (N/A) / (N/A) 2028 | Qualified as co-host | | | | | | | |
| Total | Qualified: 9/35 | | 38 | 8 | 30 | 36 | 101 | — |

=== European Volleyball League ===
Champions Runners up Third place Fourth place

European Volleyball League record
| Year | Round | Position | Pld | W | L | SW | SL | Squad |
|---|---|---|---|---|---|---|---|---|
| (Turkey) 2009 | | 6th Place | | | | | | Squad |
| (Turkey) 2010 | | 5th Place | | | | | | Squad |
| (Turkey) 2011 | | 8th Place | | | | | | Squad |
| (Czech Republic) 2012 | | 7th Place | | | | | | Squad |
| (Bulgaria) 2013 | did not qualify | | | | | | | |
| (Germany) 2014 | | 5th Place | | | | | | Squad |
| 2015 | did not qualify | | | | | | | |
| 2016 | | 6th Place | | | | | | Squad |
| 2017 | | 3rd Place | | | | | | Squad |
| 2018 | | 10th Place | | | | | | Squad |
| 2019 | | 4th Place | | | | | | Squad |
| 2021 | | 3rd Place | | | | | | Squad |
| 2022 | | 8th Place | 4 | 1 | 3 | 3 | 10 | Squad |
| 2023 | did not participate | | | | | | | |
| 2024 | | 6th Place | 6 | 3 | 3 | 12 | 12 | Squad |
| 2025 | | 9th Place | 6 | 2 | 4 | 9 | 13 | Squad |
| 2026 | | 6th Place | 6 | 5 | 1 | 15 | 5 | Squad |
| Total | 0 Titles | 14/17 | | | | | | |

=== Mediterranean Games ===
Champions Runners up Third place Fourth place

Mediterranean Games record
| Year | Round | Position | Pld | W | L | SW | SL | Squad |
|---|---|---|---|---|---|---|---|---|
| (Algeria) 1975 | did not qualify | | | | | | | |
| (Socialist Federal Republic of Yugoslavia) 1979 | | 5th Place | | | | | | Squad |
| (Morocco) 1983 | did not qualify | | | | | | | |
| (Syria) 1987 | did not qualify | | | | | | | |
| (Greece) 1991 | | 6th Place | | | | | | Squad |
| (France) 1993 | | 5th Place | | | | | | Squad |
| (Italy) 1997 | did not qualify | | | | | | | |
| (Tunisia) 2001 | | 5th Place | | | | | | Squad |
| (Spain) 2005 | | 6th Place | 4 | 2 | 2 | 9 | 8 | Squad |
| (Italy) 2009 | did not qualify | | | | | | | |
| (Turkey) 2013 | did not qualify | | | | | | | |
| (Spain) 2018 | Quarterfinals | 6th place | 5 | 2 | 3 | 9 | 10 | Squad |
| (Algeria) 2022 | Semifinals | 4th place | 6 | 2 | 4 | 9 | 12 | Squad |
| Total | 0 Titles | 7/13 | | | | | | |

== Head-to-head record ==
This page shows Spain women's national volleyball team's Head-to-head record at the Volleyball at the Summer Olympics, FIVB Women's Volleyball World Championship, FIVB Volleyball Women's World Cup.

| Opponent | GP | MW | ML | SW | SL |
|---|---|---|---|---|---|
| Argentina | 1 | 0 | 1 | 2 | 3 |
| Brazil | 1 | 0 | 1 | 0 | 3 |
| Bulgaria | 1 | 0 | 1 | 0 | 3 |
| Canada | 1 | 0 | 1 | 1 | 3 |
| China | 1 | 0 | 1 | 0 | 3 |
| Germany | 1 | 0 | 1 | 0 | 3 |
| Indonesia | 1 | 1 | 0 | 3 | 0 |
| Japan | 3 | 0 | 3 | 0 | 9 |
| Kenya | 1 | 1 | 0 | 3 | 0 |
| Mexico | 1 | 0 | 1 | 0 | 3 |
| Nigeria | 1 | 1 | 0 | 3 | 0 |
| Paraguay | 2 | 0 | 2 | 2 | 6 |
| Peru | 1 | 0 | 1 | 0 | 3 |
| South Korea | 1 | 0 | 1 | 0 | 3 |
| Soviet Union | 2 | 0 | 2 | 0 | 6 |
| United States | 1 | 0 | 1 | 0 | 3 |
| West Germany | 1 | 0 | 1 | 0 | 3 |
| Total | 21 | 3 | 18 | 14 | 54 |
