= Greece men's national volleyball team =

Greece
- Association: Hellenic Volleyball Federation
- Confederation: CEV
- Head coach: Kostas Christofidelis
- FIVB ranking: 23 (3 August 2026)

Uniforms
Home	Away

Summer Olympics
- Appearances: 1 (First in 2004)
- Best result: 5th (2004)

World Championship
- Appearances: 5 (First in 1986)
- Best result: 6th (1994)

European Championship
- Appearances: 14 (First in 1967)
- Best result: (bronze) (1987)
- Website

Greece men's national volleyball team
Medal record

European Championship
Bronze medal – third place	1987 Belgium	Team

European League
Silver medal – second place	2014 Montenegro	Team
Bronze medal – third place	2006 Turkey	Team

Mediterranean Games
Silver medal – second place	1979 Yugoslavia	Team
Bronze medal – third place	1971 Turkey	Team
Bronze medal – third place	1983 Morocco	Team
Bronze medal – third place	2018 Tarragona	Team

The Greece men's national volleyball team is the national team of Greece. It is governed by the Hellenic Volleyball Federation and takes part in international volleyball competitions.

== Results ==
Champions Runners up Third place Fourth place

=== Olympic Games ===
Summer Olympics record
Year	Round	Position	Pld	W	L	SW	SL	Squad
(Japan) 1964	Did not qualify							
(Mexico) 1968	Did not qualify							
(West Germany) 1972	Did not qualify							
(Canada) 1976	Did not qualify							
(Soviet Union) 1980	Did not qualify							
(United States) 1984	Did not qualify							
(South Korea) 1988	Did not qualify							
(Spain) 1992	Did not qualify							
(United States) 1996	Did not qualify							

Summer Olympics record
Year	Round	Position	Pld	W	L	SW	SL	Squad
(Australia) 2000	Did not qualify							
(Greece) 2004	Quarterfinals	5th	6	3	3	14	12	Squad
(China) 2008	Did not qualify							
(United Kingdom) 2012	Did not qualify							
(Brazil) 2016	Did not qualify							
(Japan) 2020	Did not qualify							
(France) 2024	Did not qualify							
Total	0 Titles	1/15	6	3	3	14	12	

=== World Championship ===
FIVB World Championship record
Year	Round	Position	Pld	W	L	SW	SL	Squad
(Czechoslovakia) 1949	Did not qualify							
(Soviet Union) 1952	Did not qualify							
(France) 1956	Did not qualify							
(Brazil) 1960	Did not qualify							
(Soviet Union) 1962	Did not qualify							
(Czechoslovakia) 1966	Did not qualify							
(Bulgaria) 1970	Did not qualify							
(Mexico) 1974	Did not qualify							
(Italy) 1978	Did not qualify							
(Argentina) 1982	Did not qualify							
(France) 1986	First round	13th	3	0	3	0	9	Squad
(Brazil) 1990	Did not qualify							
(Greece) 1994	Quarterfinals	6th	4	3	1	9	5	Squad
(Japan) 1998	Second round	13th	10	2	8	11	26	Squad

FIVB World Championship record
Year	Round	Position	Pld	W	L	SW	SL	Squad
(Argentina) 2002	Quarterfinals	7th	9	4	5	14	20	Squad
(Japan) 2006	First round	17th	5	1	4	6	13	Squad
(Italy) 2010	Did not qualify							
(Poland) 2014	Did not qualify							
(Italy) (Bulgaria) 2018	Did not qualify							
(Poland) (Slovenia) 2022	Did not qualify							
(Philippines) 2025	Did not qualify							
(Poland) 2027	To be determined							
(Qatar) 2029	To be determined							
Total	0 Titles	5/23	31	10	21	40	73	

=== European Championship ===
European Championship record
Year	Round	Position	Pld	W	L	SW	SL	Squad
(Italy) 1948	Did not qualify							
(Bulgaria) 1950	Did not qualify							
(France) 1951	Did not qualify							
(Romania) 1955	Did not qualify							
(Czechoslovakia) 1958	Did not qualify							
(Romania) 1963	Did not qualify							
(Turkey) 1967	Preliminary round	20th	7	0	7	2	21	Squad
(Italy) 1971	Preliminary round	17th	7	4	3	12	9	Squad
(Socialist Federal Republic of Yugoslavia) 1975	Did not qualify							
(Finland) 1977	Did not qualify							
(France) 1979	Preliminary round	12th	8	1	7	7	22	Squad
(Bulgaria) 1981	Did not qualify							
(East Germany) 1983	Preliminary round	9th	8	3	5	13	16	Squad
(Netherlands) 1985	Preliminary round	8th	8	5	3	15	14	Squad
(Belgium) 1987	Semifinals	3rd	7	5	2	16	13	Squad
(Sweden) 1989	Preliminary round	10th	7	1	6	10	18	Squad
(Germany) 1991	Preliminary round	11th	5	1	4	6	13	Squad
(Finland) 1993	Did not qualify							
(Greece) 1995	Preliminary round	7th	7	4	3	13	12	Squad
(Netherlands) 1997	Preliminary round	11th	5	0	5	3	15	Squad
(Austria) 1999	Did not qualify							

European Championship record
Year	Round	Position	Pld	W	L	SW	SL	Squad
(Czech Republic) 2001	Did not qualify							
(Germany) 2003	Preliminary round	11th	5	1	4	7	13	Squad
(Italy) (Serbia and Montenegro) 2005	Preliminary round	6th	5	3	2	10	11	Squad
(Russia) 2007	First round	13th	3	1	2	4	8	Squad
(Turkey) 2009	Playoff round	8th	8	5	3	17	14	Squad
(Austria) (Czech Republic) 2011	Did not qualify							
(Denmark) (Poland) 2013	Did not qualify							
(Bulgaria) (Italy) 2015	Did not qualify							
(Poland) 2017	Did not qualify							
(Belgium) (France) (Netherlands) (Slovenia) 2019	Round of 16	16th	6	1	5	5	16	Squad
(Poland) (Czech Republic) (Estonia) (Finland) 2021	Preliminary round	22nd	5	0	5	6	15	Squad
(Italy) (North Macedonia) (Bulgaria) (Israel) 2023	Preliminary round	22nd	5	1	4	7	14	Squad
(Bulgaria) (Finland) (Italy) (Romania) 2026	Round of 16	11th	6	3	3	12	12	Squad
(Montenegro) 2028	To be determined							
Total	0 Titles	18/35	112	39	73	165	256	

=== World League ===
FIVB World League record
Year	Round	Position	Pld	W	L	SW	SL	Squad
(Japan) 1990	Did not enter							
(Italy) 1991	Did not enter							
(Italy) 1992	Did not enter							
(Brazil) 1993	Intercontinental round	11th	20	3	17	21	54	Squad
(Italy) 1994	Intercontinental round	7th	12	5	7	15	27	Squad
(Brazil) 1995	Intercontinental round	9th	12	3	9	14	30	Squad
(Netherlands) 1996	Intercontinental round	11th	12	1	11	4	35	Squad
(Russia) 1997	Did not enter							
(Italy) 1998	Intercontinental round	12th	12	2	10	10	33	Squad
(Argentina) 1999	Did not enter							
(Netherlands) 2000	Did not enter							
(Poland) 2001	Intercontinental round	9th	12	6	6	24	25	Squad
(Brazil) 2002	Intercontinental round	9th	12	6	6	23	23	Squad
(Spain) 2003	Final round	7th	15	7	8	27	34	Squad
(Italy) 2004	Intercontinental round	5th	12	5	7	22	25	Squad
(Serbia and Montenegro) 2005	Intercontinental round	7th	12	5	7	22	24	Squad
(Russia) 2006	Did not enter							
(Poland) 2007	Did not enter							
(Brazil) 2008	Did not enter							
(Serbia) 2009	Did not enter							

FIVB World League record
Year	Round	Position	Pld	W	L	SW	SL	Squad
(Argentina) 2010	Did not enter							
(Poland) 2011	Did not enter							
(Bulgaria) 2012	Did not enter							
(Argentina) 2013	Did not enter							
(Italy) 2014	Did not enter							
(Brazil) 2015	G3 Intercontinental round	25th	6	4	2	16	12	Squad
(Poland) 2016	G3 Semifinals	27th	8	6	2	18	10	Squad
(Brazil) 2017	G3 Intercontinental round	36th	6	0	6	4	18	Squad
Total	0 Titles	13/28	151	53	98	220	350	

=== European League ===
European League record
Year	Round	Position	Pld	W	L	SW	SL	Squad
(Czech Republic) 2004	Did not enter							
(Russia) 2005	Did not enter							
(Turkey) 2006	Semifinals	3rd	14	8	6	29	24	Squad
(Portugal) 2007	League round	8th	12	5	7	19	25	Squad
(Turkey) 2008	League round	6th	12	4	8	21	25	Squad
(Portugal) 2009	League round	8th	12	4	8	20	29	Squad
(Spain) 2010	League round	5th	12	5	7	24	23	Squad
(Slovakia) 2011	League round	10th	12	3	9	14	29	Squad
(Turkey) 2012	League round	10th	12	3	9	17	31	Squad
(Turkey) 2013	Did not enter							
(Montenegro) 2014	Final	2nd	12	6	6	26	24	Squad

European League record
Year	Round	Position	Pld	W	L	SW	SL	Squad
(Poland) 2015	League round	5th	10	7	3	23	15	Squad
(Bulgaria) 2016	Did not enter							
(Denmark) 2017	Did not enter							
(Czech Republic) 2018	Did not enter							
2019	Silver League Final	2nd (14th)	8	5	3	18	11	Squad
(Belgium) 2021	Did not enter							
(Croatia) 2022	Did not enter							
(Croatia) 2023	Did not enter							
(Croatia) 2024	Did not enter							
(Czech Republic) 2025	Final round	4th	8	5	3	18	13	Squad
(Finland) (Netherlands) 2026	League round	5th	6	5	1	17	4	Squad
Total	0 Titles	12/22	130	60	70	246	253	

=== Mediterranean Games ===
Mediterranean Games record
Year	Round	Position	Pld	W	L	SW	SL	Squad
(Lebanon) 1959	Did not enter							
(Italy) 1963	Did not enter							
(Tunisia) 1967	Did not enter							
(Turkey) 1971		3rd						Squad
(Algeria) 1975		4th						Squad
(Socialist Federal Republic of Yugoslavia) 1979		2nd						Squad
(Morocco) 1983		3rd						Squad
(Syria) 1987		6th						Squad
(Greece) 1991		5th						Squad
(France) 1993		4th						Squad
(Italy) 1997	Did not enter							

Mediterranean Games record
Year	Round	Position	Pld	W	L	SW	SL	Squad
(Tunisia) 2001		7th						Squad
(Spain) 2005	Quarterfinals	7th	5	3	2	9	8	Squad
(Italy) 2009		6th						Squad
(Turkey) 2013	Did not enter							
(Spain) 2018	Semifinals	3rd	5	3	2	9	8	Squad
(Algeria) 2022	Quarterfinals	7th	5	2	3	9	12	Squad
Total	0 Titles	11/16						

== Current squad ==
The following is the Greek roster in the 2019 European Championship.

Head coach: Dimitrios Andreopoulos

No.	Name	Date of birth	Height	Weight	Spike	Block	2019–20 club
1	Dimitrios Zisis	2 February 1994	1.83 m (6 ft 0 in)	0 kg (0 lb)	290 cm (110 in)	280 cm (110 in)	(Greece) Panathinaikos
3	Nikos Zoupani	10 March 1989	1.99 m (6 ft 6 in)	85 kg (187 lb)	355 cm (140 in)	330 cm (130 in)	(Greece) Kifissia
4	Iraklis Papadopoulos	2 September 1992	2.02 m (6 ft 8 in)	83 kg (183 lb)	0 cm (0 in)	0 cm (0 in)	(Greece) Pamvohaikos
5	Dmytro Filippov	4 December 1990	1.98 m (6 ft 6 in)	84 kg (185 lb)	343 cm (135 in)	320 cm (130 in)	(Greece) P.A.O.K. Thessaloniki
6	Konstantinos Stivachtis	22 May 1980	1.86 m (6 ft 1 in)	80 kg (180 lb)	305 cm (120 in)	295 cm (116 in)	(Greece) Olympiacos
7	Georgios Petreas (C)	19 November 1986	2.01 m (6 ft 7 in)	92 kg (203 lb)	342 cm (135 in)	320 cm (130 in)	(Greece) Olympiacos
9	Menelaos Kokkinakis	21 January 1993	1.93 m (6 ft 4 in)	79 kg (174 lb)	325 cm (128 in)	305 cm (120 in)	(Greece) Olympiacos
10	Rafail Koumentakis	5 May 1993	2.03 m (6 ft 8 in)	84 kg (185 lb)	330 cm (130 in)	31 cm (12 in)	(Greece) Olympiacos
11	Alexandros Raptis	16 February 2000	1.98 m (6 ft 6 in)	0 kg (0 lb)	0 cm (0 in)	0 cm (0 in)	(Greece) Panathinaikos
12	Theodoros Voulkidis	30 March 1996	2.00 m (6 ft 7 in)	0 kg (0 lb)	0 cm (0 in)	0 cm (0 in)	(Greece) Foinikas Syros
14	Panagiotis Pelekoudas	8 November 1989	2.04 m (6 ft 8 in)	0 kg (0 lb)	348 cm (137 in)	339 cm (133 in)	(Greece) Panathinaikos
15	Andreas-Dimitrios Frangos	21 December 1989	2.00 m (6 ft 7 in)	93 kg (205 lb)	320 cm (130 in)	315 cm (124 in)	(Belgium) Knack Volley Roeselare
17	Athanasios Protopsaltis	12 September 1993	1.85 m (6 ft 1 in)	73 kg (161 lb)	325 cm (128 in)	316 cm (124 in)	(Poland) Cerrad Czarni Radom
19	Georgios Papalexiou	28 August 1999	2.02 m (6 ft 8 in)	0 kg (0 lb)	0 cm (0 in)	0 cm (0 in)	(Greece) P.A.O.K. Thessaloniki

== See also ==
- Greece women's national volleyball team
