= Volleyball at the 2022 Mediterranean Games – Men's team rosters =

This article shows the rosters of all participating teams at the men's indoor volleyball tournament at the 2022 Mediterranean Games in Oran, Algeria.

== Group A ==
=== Egypt ===
The following is the Egypt's roster in the 2022 Mediterranean Games.

Head Coach: (Egypt) Sayed Salem

- 1 Ahmed Elsayed S
- 6 Mohamed Hassan L
- 7 Seifeldin Ali OS
- 8 Abdelrahman Eissa OS
- 10 Mohamed Masoud MB
- 13 Mohamed Khater MB
- 14 Yossef Morgan S
- 16 Mohamed Soliman MB
- 18 Ahmed Shfik WS
- 19 Zyad Mohamed OS
- 21 Youssef Awad WS
- 23 Ahmed Omar WS

=== Italy ===
The following is the Italy's roster in the 2022 Mediterranean Games.

Head Coach: (Italy) Francesco Andreoni

- 2 Leonardo Ferrato S
- 3 Francesco Recine OS
- 4 Federico Crosato MB
- 8 Alberto Pol OS
- 10 Marco Falaschi S
- 11 Davide Gardini OS
- 14 Giulio Magalini OS
- 15 Gabriele di Martino MB
- 18 Fabrizio Gironi WS
- 21 Andrea Schiro OS
- 23 Damiano Catania L
- 25 Marco Vitteli MB

=== North Macedonia ===
The following is the North Macedonia's roster in the 2022 Mediterranean Games.

Head Coach: (North Macedonia) Djordje Nahod

- 2 Gjorg Gjorgiev S
- 3 Stefan Aleksov OS
- 4 Nikola Gjorgiev OS
- 5 Vlado Milev OS
- 6 Kostadin Richliev L
- 7 Slave Nakov MB
- 11 Filip Despotovski S
- 15 Filip Madjunkov MB
- 16 Stojan Iliev WS
- 17 Luka Kostikj WS
- 18 Vase Mihailov WS
- 20 Filip Savovski MB

== Group B ==
=== Algeria ===
The following is the Algeria's roster in the 2022 Mediterranean Games.

Head Coach: (Algeria) Salim Achouri

- 1 Ilyas Achouri L
- 2 Sofiane Bouyoucef MB
- 3 Ahmed Amir Kerboua WS
- 6 Mohamed Amine Oumessad MB
- 7 Ali Kerboua WS
- 8 Boudjemaa Ikken OS
- 9 Abderraouf Hamimes S
- 11 Soufiane Hosni WS
- 16 Islem Ould Cherchali MB
- 17 Farouk Tizit WS
- 18 Billel Soualem WS
- 20 Youssouf Bourouba OS

=== France ===
The following is the France's roster in the 2022 Mediterranean Games.

Head Coach: (France) Julien Guiborel

- 1 Kellian Motta Paes S
- 2 Luca Ramon L
- 3 Thomas Nevot S
- 6 Ibrahim Lawani OS
- 7 Joachim Panou WS
- 8 Francois Rebeyrol WS
- 9 Luka Bašič WS
- 10 Theo Faure OS
- 11 Antoine Pathron WS
- 12 Kevin Kaba MB
- 13 Mousse Gueye MB
- 15 Simon Roehrig MB

=== Greece ===
The following is the Greece's roster in the 2022 Mediterranean Games.

Head Coach: (Greece) Konstantinos Christofidelis

- 1 Aristeidis Chandrinos L
- 5 Spyridon Chandrinos WS
- 6 Dimitris Komitoudis S
- 7 Giorgos Petreas MB
- 8 Georgios Tzioumakas OS
- 11 Stavros Kasampalis S
- 12 Theodoros Voulkidis MB
- 13 Charalampos Andreopoulos WS
- 15 Alexandros Raptis WS
- 19 Dimitrios Mouchlias OS
- 22 Dimosthenis Linardos MB
- 23 Spyridon Chakas WS

=== Turkey ===
The following is the Turkey's roster in the 2022 Mediterranean Games.

Head Coach: (Turkey) Kerem Eryilmaz

- 1 Arslan Ekşi S
- 3 Oğuzhan Doğruluk WS
- 5 Oğulcan Yatgın S
- 8 Gökhan Gökgöz WS
- 9 Mehmet Hacıoğlu WS
- 10 Cansin Ogbai Enaboifo OS
- 12 İzzet Ünver WS
- 13 Burakhan Tosun MB
- 15 Metin Toy OS
- 17 Doğukan Ulu MB
- 19 Berkay Bayraktar L
- 20 Mustafa Cengiz MB

== Group C ==
=== Croatia ===
The following is the Croatia's roster in the 2022 Mediterranean Games.

Head Coach: (France) Cédric Énard

- 1 Petar Višić S
- 3 Stipe Perić MB
- 4 Kruno Nikačević MB
- 6 Bernard Bakonji S
- 7 Marko Sedlaček WS
- 9 Tino Hanžić WS
- 10 Filip Šestan WS
- 11 Petar Đirlić OS
- 13 Hrvoje Pervan L
- 14 Tomislav Mitrašinović OS
- 17 Ivan Mihalj MB
- 29 Ivan Zeljković WS

=== Serbia ===
The following is the Serbia's roster in the 2022 Mediterranean Games.

Head Coach: (Serbia) Igor Žakić

- 1 Uros Nikolić MB
- 7 Andrej Polomac S
- 10 Dusan Nikolić WS
- 11 Aleksa Batak S
- 16 Aleksandar Stefanović MB
- 19 Stefan Negić L
- 23 Božidar Vučićević OS
- 24 Stefan Skakić WS
- 25 Luka Tadić WS
- 28 Lazar Marinović WS
- 34 Lazar Bajandić WS
- 35 Andrej Rudić MB

=== Spain ===
The following is the Spain's roster in the 2022 Mediterranean Games.

Head Coach: (Spain) Jose Luis Molto Carbonel

- 1 Francisco Iribarne WS
- 3 Víctor Rodríguez Pérez WS
- 6 Borja Luiz Mira MB
- 7 Jordi Ramón Ferragut WS
- 8 Unai Larrañaga Ledo L
- 12 Jean Pascal Diedhiou Diatta MB
- 15 José María Giménez Hernández WS
- 16 Andrés Villena OS
- 20 Alvaro Gimeno Rubio OS
- 21 César Martín Pérez S
- 24 David López MB
- 77 Miguel Ángel De Amo OS

=== Tunisia ===
The following is the Tunisia's roster in the 2022 Mediterranean Games.

Head Coach: (Tunisia) Khaled Ladjimi

- 2 Ahmed Kadhi MB
- 3 Khaled Ben Slimene S
- 6 Mohamed Ali Ben Othmen Miladi WS
- 7 Elyes Karamosli WS
- 8 Yassine Abdelhedi WS
- 9 Omar Agrebi MB
- 10 Hamza Nagga OS
- 12 Rami Bennour S
- 13 Selim Mbarki MB
- 18 Ali Bongui OS
- 19 Aymen Bouguerra WS
- 20 Saddem Hmissi L
