= Yugoslavia women's national volleyball team =

National sports team

Yugoslavia
- Association: Volleyball Federation of Yugoslavia
- Confederation: CEV
- Head coach: Andrew Hof
- FIVB ranking: NR (2 October 2026)

Uniforms
Home	Away
Honours
Representing Yugoslavia
European Championship
Bronze medal – third place	1951 France	Team
Mediterranean Games
Gold medal – first place	1975 Algiers	Team
Silver medal – second place	1979 Split	Team
Bronze medal – third place	1983 Casablanca	Team

The Yugoslavia women's national volleyball team was the women's national volleyball team of Yugoslavia.

== History ==
Yugoslav Volleyball Federation was founded in 1946 by the Alliance for Physical Education of Yugoslavia. In 1947, the International Volleyball Federation FIVB was founded and Yugoslavia was one of the 14 founders. From 13 February 1949, the Volleyball Federation became an independent sports organization. The greatest success of the Yugoslav women's national team was the bronze medal at the European Championship in 1951, which was also the first international medal for Yugoslav volleyball. The national team participated nine more times in the European Championships, once in the World Championships, until it failed to qualify for the Olympic Games. At the Mediterranean Games, three medals were won, one gold, one silver and one bronze for the same number of participants.

== Results ==
=== Olympic Games ===
Games	Round	Position	Pld	W	L	SF	SA
(Japan) 1964	did not qualify						
(Mexico) 1968	did not qualify						
(West Germany) 1972	did not qualify						
(Japan) 1976	did not qualify						
(Soviet Union) 1980	did not qualify						
(United States) 1984	did not qualify						
(South Korea) 1988	did not qualify						
Total	0/7	0 Title	0	0	0	0	0

=== World Championship ===
Games	Round	Position	Pld	W	L	SF	SA
(Soviet Union) 1952	did not qualify						
(France) 1956	did not qualify						
(Brazil) 1960	did not qualify						
(Soviet Union) 1967	did not qualify						
(Bulgaria) 1970	did not qualify						
(Mexico) 1974	did not qualify						
(Soviet Union) 1978	First round	16th	9	4	5	15	16
(Peru) 1982	did not qualify						
(Czechoslovakia) 1986	did not qualify						
(China) 1990	did not qualify						
Total	1/10	0 Titles	9	4	5	15	16

=== European Championship ===
Year	Round	Position	Pld	W	L	SW	SL
(Soviet Union) 1949	did not qualify						
(Bulgaria) 1950	did not qualify						
(France) 1951	Final round	3rd place, bronze medalist(s)	5	2	3	7	9
(Romania) 1955	did not qualify						
(Czechoslovakia) 1958	Final Pool	7th	9	2	7	11	22
(Romania) 1963	Final Pool	8th	9	1	8	6	25
(Turkey) 1967	did not qualify						
(Italy) 1971	Preliminary Round	14th	7	4	3	14	9
(Socialist Federal Republic of Yugoslavia) 1975	Preliminary Round	8th	7	4	3	15	13
(Finland) 1977	Preliminary Round	9th	7	3	4	11	16
(France) 1979	Preliminary Round	10th	7	2	5	9	16
(Bulgaria) 1981	Preliminary Round	9th	7	1	6	6	15
(East Germany) 1983	did not qualify						
(Netherlands) 1985	did not qualify						
(Belgium) 1987	did not qualify						
(West Germany) 1989	Preliminary Round	8th	7	2	5	7	15
(Italy) 1991	Preliminary Round	12th	5	0	5	2	15
Total	Qualified: 10/17		70	21	49	88	155

=== World Cup ===
- 1973-1991 - did not qualify

=== Mediterranean Games ===
Year	Round	Position	Pld	W	L	SW	SL
(Algeria) 1975	Winners	1st place, gold medalist(s)	/	/	/	/	/
(Socialist Federal Republic of Yugoslavia) 1979	Second	2nd place, silver medalist(s)	/	/	/	/	/
(Morocco) 1983	Third	3rd place, bronze medalist(s)	/	/	/	/	/
(Ba'athist Syria) 1987	did not participate						
(Greece) 1991	did not participate						

== Notable squads ==
1951 European Championship

- Štefanija Milošev, Nataša Luković, Gordana Tkačuk, Branka Popović, Desanka Končar, Danica Glumac, Liza Valentan, Anica Flis, Ančka Magušar, Tilka Završnik, coach: Branislav Marković

== Notable former players ==
- (Socialist Federal Republic of Yugoslavia) Nataša Luković
- (Socialist Federal Republic of Yugoslavia) Štefanija Milošev
- (Socialist Federal Republic of Yugoslavia) Milica Stojadinović (1955–1971)
- (Socialist Federal Republic of Yugoslavia) Cvijeta Stakić
- (Socialist Federal Republic of Yugoslavia) Nada Gašević
- (Socialist Federal Republic of Yugoslavia) Gabrijela Hrvat - Jurkić

== See also ==
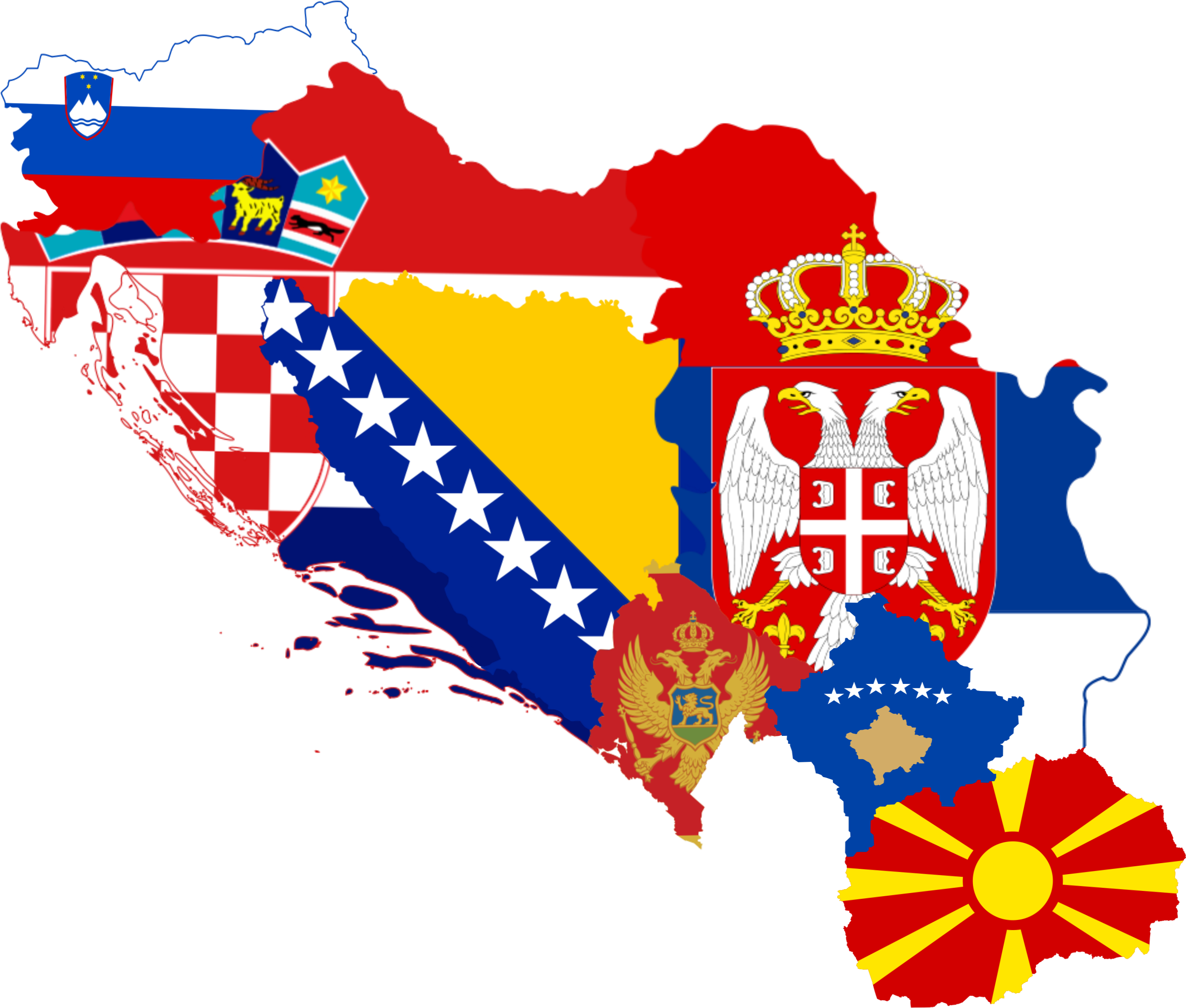

- Bosnia and Herzegovina women's national volleyball team
- Croatia women's national volleyball team
- Kosovo women's national volleyball team
- Serbia women's national volleyball team
- Slovenia women's national volleyball team
- North Macedonia women's national volleyball team
- Montenegro women's national volleyball team
- Yugoslavia men's national volleyball team
