= Volleyball at the 2005 Mediterranean Games – Men's tournament =

Men's Volleyball at the 2005 Mediterranean Games

The Men's Volleyball tournament at the 2005 Mediterranean Games was held in Almería, Spain.

== Teams ==
Group A

- Italy
- San Marino
- Serbia and M.

Group B

- Albania
- France
- Tunisia

Group C

- Greece
- Morocco
- Turkey

Group D

- Croatia
- Egypt
- Spain

== Preliminary round ==
=== Group A ===
| | Team | Points | G | W | L | PW | PL | Ratio | SW | SL | Ratio |
|---|---|---|---|---|---|---|---|---|---|---|---|
| 1. | Serbia and M. | 4 | 2 | 2 | 0 | 171 | 133 | 1.286 | 6 | 1 | 6.000 |
| 2. | Italy | 3 | 2 | 1 | 1 | 162 | 140 | 1.157 | 4 | 3 | 1.333 |
| 3. | San Marino | 2 | 2 | 0 | 2 | 90 | 150 | 0.600 | 0 | 6 | 0.000 |

- Friday June 24, 2005

| Italy | 3 – 0 | San Marino | 25–12 25–18 25–14 |

- Sunday June 26, 2005

| Serbia and M. | 3 – 0 | San Marino | 25–15 25–18 25–13 |

- Tuesday June 28, 2005

| Italy | 1 – 3 | Serbia and M. | 25–21 22–25 22–25 18–25 |

=== Group B ===
| | Team | Points | G | W | L | PW | PL | Ratio | SW | SL | Ratio |
|---|---|---|---|---|---|---|---|---|---|---|---|
| 1. | Tunisia | 4 | 2 | 2 | 0 | 173 | 129 | 1.341 | 6 | 1 | 6.000 |
| 2. | France | 3 | 2 | 1 | 1 | 158 | 161 | 0.981 | 4 | 3 | 1.333 |
| 3. | Albania | 2 | 2 | 0 | 2 | 109 | 150 | 0.727 | 0 | 6 | 0.000 |

- Friday June 24, 2005

| Tunisia | 3 – 0 | Albania | 25–12 25–19 25–15 |

- Sunday June 26, 2005

| France | 3 – 0 | Albania | 25–23 25–20 25–20 |

- Tuesday June 28, 2005

| Tunisia | 3 – 1 | France | 23–25 25–20 25–16 25–22 |

=== Group C ===
| | Team | Points | G | W | L | PW | PL | Ratio | SW | SL | Ratio |
|---|---|---|---|---|---|---|---|---|---|---|---|
| 1. | Greece | 4 | 2 | 2 | 0 | 150 | 121 | 1.240 | 6 | 0 | 6.000 |
| 2. | Turkey | 3 | 2 | 1 | 1 | 135 | 124 | 1.089 | 3 | 3 | 1.000 |
| 3. | Morocco | 2 | 2 | 0 | 2 | 110 | 150 | 0.733 | 0 | 6 | 0.000 |

- Friday June 24, 2005

| Turkey | 3 – 0 | Morocco | 25–18 25–21 25–22 |

- Sunday June 26, 2005

| Greece | 3 – 0 | Morocco | 25–18 25–21 25–22 |

- Tuesday June 28, 2005

| Turkey | 0 – 3 | Greece | 19–25 20–25 21–25 |

=== Group D ===
| | Team | Points | G | W | L | PW | PL | Ratio | SW | SL | Ratio |
|---|---|---|---|---|---|---|---|---|---|---|---|
| 1. | Spain | 4 | 2 | 2 | 0 | 171 | 147 | 1.163 | 6 | 1 | 6.000 |
| 2. | Egypt | 3 | 2 | 1 | 1 | 162 | 181 | 0.895 | 3 | 5 | 0.600 |
| 3. | Croatia | 2 | 2 | 0 | 2 | 191 | 196 | 0.974 | 3 | 6 | 0.500 |

- Friday June 24, 2005

| Spain | 3 – 0 | Egypt | 25–23 25–18 25–21 |

- Sunday June 26, 2005

| Croatia | 2 – 3 | Egypt | 25–19 23–25 23–25 25–16 10–15 |

- Tuesday June 28, 2005

| Spain | 3 – 1 | Croatia | 20–25 25–18 26–24 25–18 |

=== Final round ===
Quarter-finals
Serbia and M. | 3
France | 2
Greece | 0
Egypt | 3
Tunisia | 3
Italy | 1
Spain | 3
Turkey | 0

Semi-finals
Serbia and M. | 1
Egypt | 3
Tunisia | 0
Spain | 3

Final
Egypt | 3
Spain | 2
Third place
Serbia and M. | 3
Tunisia | 0

==== Quarter finals ====
- Thursday June 30, 2005

| Serbia and M. | 3 – 2 | France | 25–17 24–26 22–25 25–16 15–11 |
| Greece | 0 – 3 | Egypt | 19–25 19–25 20–25 |
| Tunisia | 3 – 1 | Italy | 17–25 29–27 25–22 25–19 |
| Spain | 3 – 0 | Turkey | 25–19 25–15 25–18 |

==== Classification matches ====
- Friday July 1, 2005

| Italy | 3 – 0 | Turkey | 27–25 25–18 26–24 |
| France | 3 – 0 | Greece | 25–19 25–23 25–20 |

==== Semi finals ====
- Saturday July 2, 2005

| Serbia and M. | 1 – 3 | Egypt | 22–25 23–25 25–21 19–25 |
| Tunisia | 0 – 3 | Spain | 21–25 18–25 24–26 |

==== Finals ====
- Sunday July 3, 2005 — Classification Match (7th/8th place)

| Greece | 3 – 2 | Turkey | 25–23 25–23 21–25 23–25 15–10 |

- Sunday July 3, 2005 — Classification Match (5th/6th place)

| France | 2 – 3 | Italy | 25–22 24–26 26–24 21–25 13–15 |

- Sunday July 3, 2005 — Classification Match (Bronze-medal match)

| Serbia and M. | 3 – 0 | Tunisia | 25–20 26–24 29–27 |

- Sunday July 3, 2005 — Classification Match (Gold-medal match)

| Egypt | 3 – 2 | Spain | 23–25 27–25 18–25 25–17 18–16 |

=== Final ranking ===
| RANK | TEAM |
|---|---|
| | Egypt |
| | Spain |
| | Serbia and Montenegro |
| 4. | Tunisia |
| 5. | Italy |
| 6. | France |
| 7. | Greece |
| 8. | Turkey |

=== Awards ===
2005 Men's Mediterranean Games champions

Egypt

=== See also ===
- 2005 Men's European Volleyball Championship
