= Kuljić =

Kuljić (Serbian Cyrillic: Куљић) is a South Slavic surname. Notable people with the surname include:

- Sanel Kuljić (born 1977), Austrian footballer of Bosnian descent
- Zdravko Kuljić (born 1953), Yugoslav volleyball player
