= Volleyball at the 2022 Mediterranean Games – Men's tournament =

Men's Volleyball at the 2022 Mediterranean Games
- Venue: Hamou Boutlélis Sports Palace; Belgaïd Multipurpose Omnisport Hall
- Location: (Algeria) Oran
- Dates: 26 June – 4 July
- Nations: 11

Medalists
| gold medal | Croatia |
| silver medal | Spain |
| bronze medal | Italy |

The men's volleyball tournament at the 2022 Mediterranean Games was held from 26 June to 4 July at the Hamou Boutlélis Sports Palace in Oran, Algeria.

== Participating teams ==
- Algeria (host)
- Croatia
- Egypt
- Spain
- France
- Greece
- Italy
- North Macedonia
- Serbia
- Tunisia
- Turkey

== Venues ==
| Preliminary round, Final round | | Classification matches | |
|---|---|---|---|
| Oran, Algeria | Oran is located in Algeria | Bir El Djir, Algeria | Bir El Djir is located in Algeria |
| Hamou Boutlélis Sports Palace | Oran is located in Algeria | Belgaïd Multipurpose Omnisport Hall | Bir El Djir is located in Algeria |
| Capacity: 5,000 | Oran is located in Algeria | Capacity: 1,000 | Bir El Djir is located in Algeria |

== Preliminary round ==
All times are local (UTC+1).

=== Group A ===
| Pos | Team | Pld | W | L | Pts | SW | SL | SR | SPW | SPL | SPR | Qualification |
|---|---|---|---|---|---|---|---|---|---|---|---|---|
| 1 | Italy | 2 | 2 | 0 | 6 | 6 | 0 | MAX | 150 | 112 | 1.339 | Final round |
| 2 | Egypt | 2 | 1 | 1 | 3 | 3 | 3 | 1.000 | 129 | 141 | 0.915 | Final round |
| 3 | North Macedonia | 2 | 0 | 2 | 0 | 0 | 6 | 0.000 | 124 | 150 | 0.827 | |

| Date | Time | | Score | | Set 1 | Set 2 | Set 3 | Set 4 | Set 5 | Total | Report |
|---|---|---|---|---|---|---|---|---|---|---|---|
| 26 Jun | 09:00 | Egypt | 0–3 | Italy | 14–25 | 20–25 | 20–25 | | | 54–75 | P2 P3 |
| 27 Jun | 09:00 | North Macedonia | 0–3 | Egypt | 23–25 | 23–25 | 20–25 | | | 66–75 | P2 P3 |
| 28 Jun | 09:00 | Italy | 3–0 | North Macedonia | 25–19 | 25–16 | 25–23 | | | 75–58 | P2 P3 |

=== Group B ===
| Pos | Team | Pld | W | L | Pts | SW | SL | SR | SPW | SPL | SPR | Qualification |
|---|---|---|---|---|---|---|---|---|---|---|---|---|
| 1 | France | 3 | 3 | 0 | 8 | 9 | 2 | 4.500 | 265 | 226 | 1.173 | Final round |
| 2 | Turkey | 3 | 1 | 2 | 4 | 5 | 6 | 0.833 | 230 | 253 | 0.909 | Final round |
| 3 | Greece | 3 | 1 | 2 | 3 | 5 | 8 | 0.625 | 286 | 285 | 1.004 | Final round |
| 4 | Algeria | 3 | 1 | 2 | 3 | 3 | 6 | 0.500 | 156 | 213 | 0.732 | |

| Date | Time | | Score | | Set 1 | Set 2 | Set 3 | Set 4 | Set 5 | Total | Report |
|---|---|---|---|---|---|---|---|---|---|---|---|
| 26 Jun | 18:00 | Turkey | 3–0 | Algeria | 25–22 | 25–23 | 25–23 | | | 75–68 | P2 P3 |
| 26 Jun | 21:00 | France | 3–2 | Greece | 30–28 | 22–25 | 20–25 | 25–19 | 18–16 | 115–113 | P2 P3 |
| 27 Jun | 18:00 | Algeria | 0–3 | France | 18–25 | 18–25 | 16–25 | | | 52–75 | P2 P3 |
| 27 Jun | 21:00 | Greece | 3–2 | Turkey | 25–23 | 22–25 | 25–8 | 23–25 | 15–13 | 110–94 | P2 P3 |
| 28 Jun | 18:00 | Greece | 0–3 | Algeria | 24–26 | 20–25 | 19–25 | | | 63–76 | P2 P3 |
| 28 Jun | 21:00 | Turkey | 0–3 | France | 21–25 | 22–25 | 18–25 | | | 61–75 | P1 P3 |

=== Group C ===
| Pos | Team | Pld | W | L | Pts | SW | SL | SR | SPW | SPL | SPR | Qualification |
|---|---|---|---|---|---|---|---|---|---|---|---|---|
| 1 | Croatia | 3 | 2 | 1 | 7 | 8 | 4 | 2.000 | 272 | 281 | 0.968 | Final round |
| 2 | Spain | 3 | 2 | 1 | 5 | 7 | 5 | 1.400 | 288 | 250 | 1.152 | Final round |
| 3 | Tunisia | 3 | 2 | 1 | 5 | 6 | 5 | 1.200 | 246 | 222 | 1.108 | Final round |
| 4 | Serbia | 3 | 0 | 3 | 1 | 2 | 9 | 0.222 | 216 | 269 | 0.803 | |

| Date | Time | | Score | | Set 1 | Set 2 | Set 3 | Set 4 | Set 5 | Total | Report |
|---|---|---|---|---|---|---|---|---|---|---|---|
| 26 Jun | 12:00 | Tunisia | 3–0 | Serbia | 25–22 | 25–15 | 25–20 | | | 75–57 | P1 P3 |
| 26 Jun | 15:00 | Croatia | 3–1 | Spain | 27–25 | 25–23 | 22–25 | 28–26 | | 102–99 | P2 P3 |
| 27 Jun | 12:00 | Serbia | 0–3 | Croatia | 20–25 | 19–25 | 28–30 | | | 67–80 | P2 P3 |
| 27 Jun | 15:00 | Spain | 3–0 | Tunisia | 25–17 | 25–17 | 25–22 | | | 75–56 | P1 P3 |
| 28 Jun | 12:00 | Spain | 3–2 | Serbia | 22–25 | 25–19 | 23–25 | 25–23 | 19–17 | 114–109 | P2 P3 |
| 28 Jun | 15:00 | Tunisia | 3–2 | Croatia | 22–25 | 25–21 | 20–25 | 25–19 | 23–21 | 115–111 | P1 P2 |

== Final round ==
=== Classification bracket ===
Classification 5th–8th
1 July
Turkey | 3
Greece | 1
1 July
Egypt | 1
Tunisia | 3

Fifth place
2 July
Turkey | 3
Tunisia | 1
Seventh place
2 July
Greece | 3
Egypt | 1

==== Classification 5th–8th ====
| Date | Time | | Score | | Set 1 | Set 2 | Set 3 | Set 4 | Set 5 | Total | Report |
|---|---|---|---|---|---|---|---|---|---|---|---|
| 1 Jul | 16:00 | Turkey | 3–1 | Greece | 25–19 | 25–15 | 21–25 | 25–21 | | 96–80 | P2 P3 |
| 1 Jul | 19:00 | Egypt | 1–3 | Tunisia | 27–25 | 22–25 | 18–25 | 23–25 | | 90–100 | P2 P3 |

==== Seventh place game ====
| Date | Time | | Score | | Set 1 | Set 2 | Set 3 | Set 4 | Set 5 | Total | Report |
|---|---|---|---|---|---|---|---|---|---|---|---|
| 2 Jul | 16:00 | Greece | 3–1 | Egypt | 25–21 | 23–25 | 25–23 | 25–22 | | 98–91 | P2 P3 |

==== Fifth place game ====
| Date | Time | | Score | | Set 1 | Set 2 | Set 3 | Set 4 | Set 5 | Total | Report |
|---|---|---|---|---|---|---|---|---|---|---|---|
| 2 Jul | 19:00 | Turkey | 3–1 | Tunisia | 25–23 | 21–25 | 25–19 | 25–22 | | 96–89 | P2 P3 |

=== Championship bracket ===
Quarter-finals
30 June
Italy | 3
Turkey | 0
30 June
Croatia | 3
Greece | 0
30 June
Egypt | 2
Spain | 3
30 June
France | 3
Tunisia | 1

Semi-finals
2 July
Italy | 1
Croatia | 3
2 July
Spain | 3
France | 0

Final
4 July
Croatia | 3
Spain | 0
Third place
4 July
Italy | 3
France | 1

==== Quarterfinals ====
| Date | Time | | Score | | Set 1 | Set 2 | Set 3 | Set 4 | Set 5 | Total | Report |
|---|---|---|---|---|---|---|---|---|---|---|---|
| 30 Jun | 10:00 | Italy | 3–0 | Turkey | 25–15 | 25–16 | 25–15 | | | 75–46 | P2 P3 |
| 30 Jun | 13:00 | Egypt | 2–3 | Spain | 25–23 | 21–25 | 25–18 | 22–25 | 9–15 | 102–106 | P2 P3 |
| 30 Jun | 16:00 | France | 3–1 | Tunisia | 26–28 | 25–20 | 25–17 | 25–23 | | 101–88 | P2 P3 |
| 30 Jun | 19:00 | Croatia | 3–0 | Greece | 25–19 | 25–19 | 25–22 | | | 75–60 | P2 P3 |

==== Semifinals ====
| Date | Time | | Score | | Set 1 | Set 2 | Set 3 | Set 4 | Set 5 | Total | Report |
|---|---|---|---|---|---|---|---|---|---|---|---|
| 2 Jul | 16:30 | Italy | 1–3 | Croatia | 24–26 | 22–25 | 25–21 | 24–26 | | 95–98 | P2 P3 |
| 2 Jul | 19:30 | Spain | 3–0 | France | 25–21 | 25–22 | 25–22 | | | 75–65 | P2 P3 |

==== Third place game ====
| Date | Time | | Score | | Set 1 | Set 2 | Set 3 | Set 4 | Set 5 | Total | Report |
|---|---|---|---|---|---|---|---|---|---|---|---|
| 4 Jul | 13:00 | Italy | 3–1 | France | 22–25 | 25–20 | 25–15 | 31–29 | | 103–89 | P2 P3 |

==== Final ====
| Date | Time | | Score | | Set 1 | Set 2 | Set 3 | Set 4 | Set 5 | Total | Report |
|---|---|---|---|---|---|---|---|---|---|---|---|
| 4 Jul | 20:00 | Croatia | 3–0 | Spain | 25–22 | 30–28 | 25–20 | | | 80–70 | P2 P3 |

== Final standings ==
| Rank | Team |
|---|---|
| 1st place, gold medalist(s) | Croatia |
| 2nd place, silver medalist(s) | Spain |
| 3rd place, bronze medalist(s) | Italy |
| 4 | France |
| 5 | Turkey |
| 6 | Tunisia |
| 7 | Greece |
| 8 | Egypt |
| 9 | Algeria |
| 9 | Serbia |
| 9 | North Macedonia |

== See also ==
- Volleyball at the Mediterranean Games
- Volleyball at the 2022 Mediterranean Games – Women's tournament
