= Travica =

Travica is a surname. Notable people with the surname include:

- Ljubomir Travica (born 1954), Yugoslav volleyball player and coach
- Dragan Travica (born 1986), Italian volleyball player of Serb origin
