= Volleyball Federation of Yugoslavia =

OSJ logo

The Volleyball Federation of Yugoslavia (Odbojkaški Savez Jugoslavije) was a national governing body of volleyball. It was founded in 1946. It organized a men's national team and a women's national team.

The federation was one of the founding members of the Fédération Internationale de Volleyball.

== Successors ==
- Volleyball Federation of Bosnia and Herzegovina
- Croatian Volleyball Federation
- Macedonian Volleyball Federation
- Volleyball Federation of Montenegro
- Volleyball Federation of Serbia
- Volleyball Federation of Slovenia
