= Volleyball at the 1971 Mediterranean Games =

Volleyball was one of the games played at the 1971 Mediterranean Games. Yugoslavia won the men's division.

== Medalists ==
| Event | Gold | Silver | Bronze |
|---|---|---|---|
| Men's Competition | Yugoslavia | Turkey | Greece |

== Standings ==
Men's competition

| Rank | Team |
|---|---|
| 1st place, gold medalist(s) | Yugoslavia |
| 2nd place, silver medalist(s) | Turkey |
| 3rd place, bronze medalist(s) | Greece |
| 4 | Tunisia |
| 5 | Egypt |
| 6 | Syria |
