= Albania women's national volleyball team =

Women's national volleyball team representing Albania

Albania
- Association: Albanian Volleyball Federation
- Confederation: CEV
- Head coach: (Albania) Altin Martiri
- FIVB ranking: NR (24 May 2026)

Uniforms
Home	Away

Mediterranean Games
- Appearances: 7 (First in 1987)
- Best result: Volleyball at the 1987 Mediterranean Games Gold Winners
- Official Website

The Albania women's national volleyball team is the national team of Albania. It is governed by the Albanian Volleyball Federation and takes part in international volleyball competitions.

== History ==
The team won the 1987 Mediterranean Games in Syria. Winning the Finals against Turkey with 3-0 set win in Larnaka the golden medal, the first for Albania in the history in a Intercontinental competition. Winning all of their 5 matches and losing only two sets against Italy 3-1 and against Greece winning with 3-1. The team would also beat Turkey like previous mentioned and Lebanon with 3-0 set wins. Albania Winning team during the period: Emanuela Axhani, Agi Babuli, Eva Duni, Lulëzime Duka, Mimoza Dule, Mimoza Ibrahimi, Egla Miço, Ingrid Murzaku, Ela Tase (cap.), Fausta Toska; trainer: Kreshnik Tartari

Albania women's national volleyball team would participate once in their history, for the Women's European Volleyball Championship in 1991 Women's European Volleyball Championship where they were drawn in Pool A in the preliminary round. They faced as their opponent's Soviet Union, Italy, Bulgaria, France and Greece. They lost all off their Matches in this pool and couldn't advance further in this Tournament.

In the same year they participated at the Mediterranean Games in 1991 finishing their campaign in the 4th place. After losing to Greece in the Third place match with 0-3 missing close on their second medal, it would be their last time that they qualify for the Medal ranking match.

Albania national team participated in the 2018 Women's European Volleyball League. They were shorted in Pool B of silver league along with Austria, Israel and Georgia. Albania started with a 3–0 win versus Georgia on 20 May 2018. Later on 2 June, Albania defeated Austria 3–2 after a long fierce game, in which they lost the first two sets, before winning the next two; the match went to the final set where Albania won 15–11. Four days later, the team clinched a spot in the semi-final by winning 3–0 versus Georgia.

Albania lost 0–3 to Sweden in the semi-final, before defeating Estonia in the 3rd place match, winning an unforeseen bronze medal.

== See also ==
- Sports in Albania
