= Vladimir Bogoevski =

Yugoslav volleyball player (born 1953)

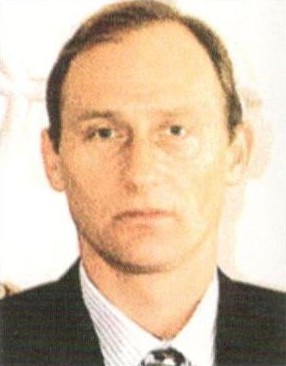

Personal information
- Nationality: Yugoslav; North Macedonia
- Born: 1 December 1953 (age 71); Skopje, Yugoslavia

Sport
- Sport: Volleyball

Vladimir Bogoevski (born 1 December 1953) is a Yugoslav volleyball player from Skopje, North Macedonia. He competed for Yugoslavia in the volleyball men's tournament at the 1980 Summer Olympics. He is the sport director of the Olympic Committee of North Macedonia.
