= Theodoros Voulkidis =

Greek volleyball player (born 1993)

Personal information
- Full name: Theodoros Voulkidis
- Born: 30 March 1996 (age 30) Katerini, Greece
- Height: 2.01 m (6 ft 7 in)
- Weight: 83 kg (183 lb)
- Spike: 331 cm (130 in)
- Block: 311 cm (122 in)

Volleyball information
- Position: Middle blocker
- Current club: Panathinaikos
- Number: 12

Career
- Years: Team
- 2010–2017 2017–2018 2018–2019 2019–2021 2021–2022 2022–2023 2023–: Niki Aiginio; Pamvochaikos; Foinikas Syros; Olympiacos; Stade Poitevin Poitiers; PAOK V.C. Panathinaikos

National team
- Years: Team
- 2019–: Greece

Theodoros Voulkidis (Greek: Θεόδωρος Βουλκίδης; born 30 March 1996) is a Greek professional volleyball player who plays as a middle blocker for Panathinaikos and the Greece national team.

== Career ==
Voulkidis began his senior club career with Niki Aiginio, where he played from 2010 to 2017. He afterwards played for Pamvochaikos and Foinikas Syros in the Greek Volleyball League.

In 2019, he joined Olympiacos, with whom he won the Greek Volleyball League during the 2020–21 season. He then moved to France to play for Stade Poitevin Poitiers club in the 2021–22 season.

Voulkidis returned to Greece in 2022 and joined PAOK V.C. in Thessaloniki. The next year he was transferred to Panathinaikos. With Panathinaikos, he won the Greek League Cup in the 2023–24 season and was named the league's best middle blocker. In the season 2025–26, he continued to play for Panathinaikos in Athens.

== International career ==
Voulkidis represented Greece in youth competitions, including the 2014 Men's U20 European Volleyball Championship qualification and the 2015 FIVB Volleyball Men's U21 World Championship. He made his senior national team debut in 2019 at the 2019 Men's European Volleyball League, held at Estonia.

He represented Greece at the 2021 Men's European Volleyball Championship (22th place) and 2023 Men's European Volleyball Championship (22th place). In 2026, he played a key role in the Greek National Team at the 2026 Men's European Volleyball Championship, held in Italy, where Greece finished in the 11th place.

== Honours ==
=== Club ===
- Greek Volleyball League
  - 2020–21 – Champion, with Olympiacos
  - 2024–25 – Champion, with Panathinaikos
  - 2025–26 – Champion, with Panathinaikos
- Greek League Cup
  - 2023–24 – Winner, with Panathinaikos
- Greek Cup
  - 2025–26 – Winner, with Panathinaikos

=== Individual awards ===
- 2024: Greek Volleyball League – Best middle blocker
