= Turkey men's national volleyball team =

Men's national volleyball team representing Turkey

Turkey
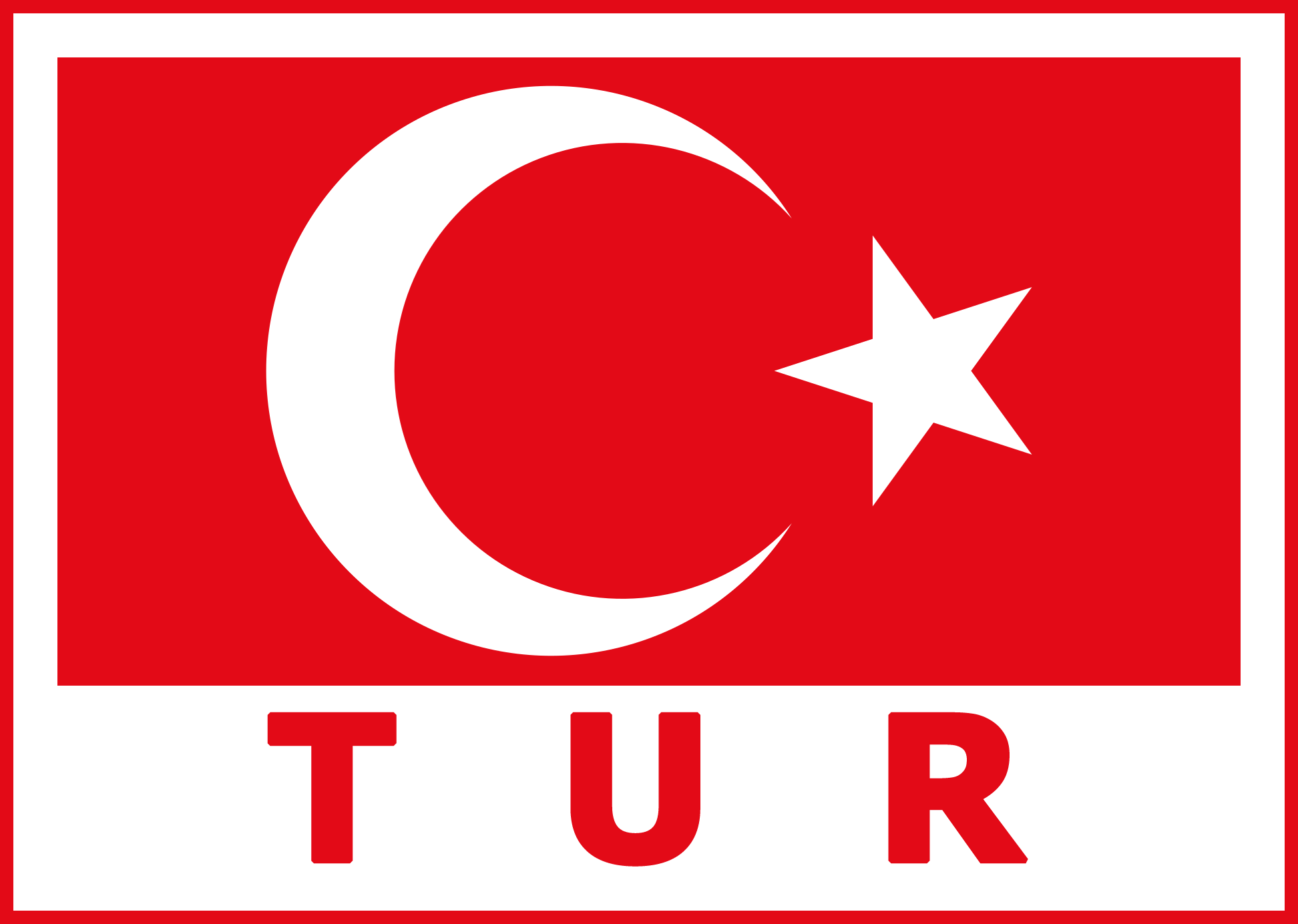
- Nickname(s): Filenin Efeleri
- Association: Türkiye Voleybol Federasyonu
- Confederation: CEV
- Head coach: Slobodan Kovač
- FIVB ranking: 17 (15 October 2026)

Uniforms
Home	Away	Third

World Championship
- Appearances: 5 (First in 1956)
- Best result: 6th (2025)

European Championship
- Appearances: 13 (First in 1958)
- Best result: 10th (2021)
- tvf.org.tr
Honours
Challenger Cup
Gold medal – first place	2023 Qatar
Silver medal – second place	2022 South Korea
European League
Gold medal – first place	2019 Estonia
Gold medal – first place	2021 Belgium
Gold medal – first place	2023 Croatia
Silver medal – second place	2012 Turkey
Silver medal – second place	2022 Croatia
Bronze medal – third place	2008 Turkey
Bronze medal – third place	2010 Spain
Bronze medal – third place	2018 Czech Republic
Mediterranean Games
Silver medal – second place	1959 Lebanon
Silver medal – second place	1971 Turkey
Silver medal – second place	1987 Syria
Silver medal – second place	1997 Italy
Bronze medal – third place	1963 Italy
Bronze medal – third place	1967 Tunisia
Bronze medal – third place	1993 France
Bronze medal – third place	2001 Tunisia
Islamic Solidarity Games
Bronze medal – third place	2013 Indonesia
Bronze medal – third place	2021 Turkey

The Turkey men's national volleyball team is the men's national team of Turkey. It is governed by the Turkish Volleyball Federation and takes part in international volleyball competitions.

== Medals ==
Event	Gold	Silver	Bronze	Total
Challenger Cup	1	1	0	2
European League	3	2	3	8
Mediterranean Games	0	4	4	8
Islamic Solidarity Games	0	0	2	2
Summer Universiade	2	0	0	2
Total	6	7	9	22

== Competitions ==
=== World Championship ===
World Championship record
Year	Round	Result	Pld	W	L	SW	SL	Squad
(Czechoslovakia) 1949 – (Soviet Union) 1952	did not enter							
(France) 1956	21st–24th places	22nd	5	2	3	8	9	
(Brazil) 1960 – (Soviet Union) 1962	did not enter							
(Czechoslovakia) 1966	9th–16th places	16th	10	2	8	7	19	
(Bulgaria) 1970 – (Greece) 1994	did not qualify							
(Japan) 1998	First round	19th	3	0	3	2	9	Squad
(Argentina) 2002 – (Italy) (Bulgaria) 2018	did not qualify							
(Poland) (Slovenia) 2022	Round of 16	11th	4	2	2	8	6	Squad
(Philippines) 2025	Quarterfinals	6th	5	4	1	12	5	Squad
(Poland) 2027	Future event							
(Qatar) 2029	Future event							
Total	5/21		27	10	17	37	48	

=== Record by Opponent ===
FIVB Men's Volleyball World Championship(by team)
Opponent	GP	MW	ML
Australia	1		1
Belgium	1		1
Brazil	1		1
Canada	2	2	
China	2	1	1
Hungary	1		1
India	1		1
Italy	2	1	1
Japan	1	1	
Libya	1	1	
Luxembourg	1	1	
Mongolia	1	1	
Netherlands	2	1	1
Poland	2		2
Romania	1		1
Russia	1		1
South Korea	1		1
Soviet Union	1		1
United States	2		2
Germany	1	1	
Yugoslavia	1		1
Total	27	10	17

=== World Cup ===
Year	Result	Pld	W	L
2023 Japan	4th place	7	4	3
Total	1/15	7	4	3

=== World League ===
World League Record
Year	Round	Result	Pld	W	L
(Japan) 1990 – (Serbia) 2009	did not enter				
(Argentina) 2010 – (Argentina) 2013	did not qualify				
(Italy) 2014	Group 3 Final	22nd	8	5	3
(Brazil) 2015	Intercontinental round	25th	6	5	1
(Poland) 2016	Group 2 Final	16th	11	8	3
(Brazil) 2017	Intercontinental round	23rd	9	3	6
Total	5/21		34	21	13

=== Nations League ===
Year	Result	GP	MW	ML	SW	SL	PW	PL	Squad
(France) 2018	did not qualify								
(United States) 2019	did not qualify								
(Italy) 2021	did not qualify								
(Italy) 2022	did not qualify								
(Poland) 2023	did not qualify								
(Poland) 2024	16th place	12	1	11	13	34	1024	1124	Squad
(China) 2025	17th place	12	3	9	14	28	945	992	Squad
(China) 2026	6th place	13	8	5	28	22	1145	1119	Squad
(N/A) 2027	qualified								
Total	4/9	37	12	25	55	84	3114	3235	—

=== Record by opponent ===
FIVB Men's Volleyball Nations League matches (by team)
Opponent	GP	MW	ML
Argentina	3	1	2
Belgium	1	1	0
Brazil	1	0	1
Bulgaria	2	1	1
Canada	2	1	1
China	2	2	0
France	3	1	2
Germany	2	1	1
Iran	2	2	0
Italy	2	0	2
Netherlands	2	0	2
Poland	3	0	3
Serbia	3	1	2
Slovenia	4	0	4
Ukraine	2	1	1
United States	3	0	3
Total	37	12	25

=== Challenger Cup ===
Challenger Cup Record
Year	Round	Result	Pld	W	L
(Portugal) 2018	did not qualify				
(Slovenia) 2019	Semifinal	4th	4	1	3
(South Korea) 2022	Final	2nd place, silver medalist(s)	3	2	1
(Qatar) 2023	Final	1st place, gold medalist(s)	3	3	0
(China) 2024	did not enter (Participated in Nations League)				
Total	3/5	Titles:1	10	6	4

=== Record by opponent ===
FIVB Men's Volleyball Challenger Cup matches (by team)
Opponent	GP	MW	ML
Belarus	1	0	1
Chile	1	1	0
Cuba	2	0	2
Dominican Republic	1	1	0
Qatar	2	2	0
Slovenia	1	0	1
South Korea	1	1	0
Ukraine	1	1	0
Total	10	6	4

=== European Championship ===
European Championship Record									Qualification Record						
Year	Result	M	W	L	SW	SL	PW	PL	M	W	L	SW	SL	PW	PL
(Italy) 1948	did not enter								no qualification						
(Bulgaria) 1950	did not enter								no qualification						
(France) 1951	did not enter								no qualification						
(Romania) 1955	did not enter								no qualification						
(Czechoslovakia) 1958	12/20	11	6	5	22	19	489	500	no qualification						
(Romania) 1963	11/17	12	8	4	27	14	551	425	no qualification						
(Turkey) 1967	14/20	10	3	7	15	25	428	512	no qualification						
(Italy) 1971	15/22	7	3	4	10	16	291	321	no qualification						
(Socialist Federal Republic of Yugoslavia) 1975	did not qualify														
(Finland) 1977	did not qualify								4	1	3	6	10		
(France) 1979	did not qualify								did not start						
(Bulgaria) 1981	did not qualify								5	3	2	10	9		
(East Germany) 1983	did not qualify								3	0	3	0	9		
(Netherlands) 1985	did not qualify								5	2	3	6	11		
(Belgium) 1987	did not qualify								5	2	3	7	9		
(Sweden) 1989	did not qualify								3	1	2	3	8		
(Germany) 1991	did not qualify								5	2	3	7	9		
(Finland) 1993	did not qualify								6	2	4	8	14		
(Greece) 1995	did not qualify								6	4	2	14	11		
(Netherlands) 1997	did not qualify								8	5	3	18	12		
(Austria) 1999	did not qualify								10	4	6	17	19		
(Czech Republic) 2001	did not qualify								6	4	2	13	9		
(Germany) 2003	did not qualify								6	1	5	7	15		
(Italy) (Serbia and Montenegro) 2005	did not qualify								6	5	1	16	4		
(Russia) 2007	15/16	3	0	3	3	9	243	287	6	5	1	17	5		
(Turkey) 2009	13/16	3	0	3	2	9	234	269	via host						
(Austria) (Czech Republic) 2011	11/16	4	1	3	6	9	320	332	8	6	2	20	9		
(Denmark) (Poland) 2013	14/16	3	0	3	4	9	283	293	8	4	4	19	14		
(Bulgaria) (Italy) 2015	did not qualify								6	3	3	12	13		
(Poland) 2017	11/16	4	1	3	5	10	339	357	8	6	2	21	10		
(France) (Slovenia) (Belgium) (Netherlands) 2019	12/24	6	2	4	9	13	474	496	via 2017 ranking						
(Poland) (Czech Republic) (Estonia) (Finland) 2021	10/24	6	3	3	14	11	579	554	4	3	1	10	4	328	263
(Italy) (Bulgaria) (North Macedonia) (Israel) 2023	13/24	6	2	4	12	13	574	546	4	3	1	11	4	349	278
(Bulgaria) (Finland) (Italy) (Romania) 2026	19/24	5	1	4	6	12	392	429	4	3	1	9	5	326	253
(Montenegro) 2028	To be determined								To be determined						
Total	13/35	80	30	50	135	169	5197	5321	126	69	57				

- 1975 results unknown
- 1983: Turkey-Belgium result unknown

=== European Volleyball League ===
European League Record
Year	Round	Result	Pld	W	L
(Czech Republic) 2004	League Round	5th	12	7	5
(Russia) 2005	Semifinal	4th	14	8	6
(Turkey) 2006	Semifinal	4th	14	6	8
(Portugal) 2007	League Round	5th	12	9	3
(Turkey) 2008	Semifinal	3rd place, bronze medalist(s)	14	7	7
(Portugal) 2009	League Round	5th	12	8	4
(Spain) 2010	Semifinal	3rd place, bronze medalist(s)	14	7	7
(Slovakia) 2011	League Round	11th	12	3	9
(Turkey) 2012	Final	2nd place, silver medalist(s)	14	6	8
(Turkey) 2013	Semifinal	4th	14	4	10
(Montenegro) 2014	League Round	8th	8	3	5
(Poland) 2015	League Round	6th	12	6	6
(Bulgaria) 2016	did not enter				
(Denmark) 2017	did not enter				
(Czech Republic) 2018	Semifinal	3rd place, bronze medalist(s)	8	5	3
(Estonia) 2019	Final	1st place, gold medalist(s)	8	8	0
(Belgium) 2021	Final	1st place, gold medalist(s)	8	8	0
(Croatia) 2022	Final	2nd place, silver medalist(s)	6	5	1
(Croatia) 2023	Final	1st place, gold medalist(s)	8	7	1
(Croatia) 2024	did not enter (Participated in Nations League)				
(Czech Republic) 2025	did not enter (Participated in Nations League)				
Total	17/21		190	107	83

=== Mediterranean Games ===
Year	Position
(Lebanon) 1959	2nd place, silver medalist(s)
(Italy) 1963	3rd place, bronze medalist(s)
(Tunisia) 1967	3rd place, bronze medalist(s)
(Turkey) 1971	2nd place, silver medalist(s)
(Algeria) 1975	5th
(Socialist Federal Republic of Yugoslavia) 1979	7th
(Morocco) 1983	7th
(Syria) 1987	2nd place, silver medalist(s)
(Greece) 1991	6th
(France) 1993	3rd place, bronze medalist(s)
(Italy) 1997	2nd place, silver medalist(s)
(Tunisia) 2001	3rd place, bronze medalist(s)
(Spain) 2005	8th
(Italy) 2009	5th
(Turkey) 2013	4th
(Spain) 2018	7th
(Algeria) 2022	5th
(Italy) 2026	

=== Other tournaments ===
- Balkan Volleyball Championship
- BVA Cup
- Islamic Solidarity Games
  - 2013 – 3rd place
  - 2017 – 4th
  - 2021 – 3rd place
- Universiade
  - 2005 – Champions
  - 2007 – Champions

== Team ==
=== Current squad ===
The following is the Turkish roster in the 2025 FIVB Men's Volleyball World Championship.

Head coach: (Serbia) Slobodan Kovac

No.	Name	Date of birth	Height	Weight	Spike	Block	2023–24 club
3	Ahmet Tümer	15 September 2001	2.03 m (6 ft 8 in)	90 kg (200 lb)	375 cm (148 in)	340 cm (130 in)	(Turkey) Galatasaray
5	Mert Matić	22 May 1995	2.11 m (6 ft 11 in)	105 kg (231 lb)	368 cm (145 in)	350 cm (140 in)	(Turkey) Halkbank
7	Bedirhan Bülbül	29 July 1999	2.00 m (6 ft 7 in)	91 kg (201 lb)	340 cm (130 in)	320 cm (130 in)	(Turkey) Ziraat Bankası
9	Ramazan Efe Mandıracı	1 April 2002	2.03 m (6 ft 8 in)	0 kg (0 lb)	370 cm (150 in)	345 cm (136 in)	(Italy) Piacenza
11	Mirza Lagumdžija	18 May 2001	2.07 m (6 ft 9 in)	90 kg (200 lb)	360 cm (140 in)	334 cm (131 in)	(Turkey) Arkas Spor
12	Adis Lagumdžija	29 March 1999	2.11 m (6 ft 11 in)	108 kg (238 lb)	360 cm (140 in)	340 cm (130 in)	(Italy) Volley Lube
14	Gökçen Yüksel	11 July 2004	2.04 m (6 ft 8 in)	89 kg (196 lb)	340 cm (130 in)	315 cm (124 in)	(Turkey) Galatasaray
16	Beytullah Hatipoğlu	24 February 1992	1.95 m (6 ft 5 in)	85 kg (187 lb)	350 cm (140 in)	330 cm (130 in)	(Turkey) Galatasaray
17	Murat Yenipazar	1 January 1993	1.93 m (6 ft 4 in)	74 kg (163 lb)	339 cm (133 in)	322 cm (127 in)	(Turkey) Ziraat Bankası
19	Berkay Bayraktar	3 July 1998	1.90 m (6 ft 3 in)	76 kg (168 lb)	320 cm (130 in)	310 cm (120 in)	(Turkey) Ziraat Bankası
23	Muhammed Kaya	7 February 1995	1.90 m (6 ft 3 in)	74 kg (163 lb)	330 cm (130 in)	320 cm (130 in)	(Turkey) Spor Toto
55	Cafer Kirkit	1 January 2001	1.93 m (6 ft 4 in)	0 kg (0 lb)	0 cm (0 in)	0 cm (0 in)	(Turkey) Altekma S.K
59	Can Koç	9 April 2003	2.00 m (6 ft 7 in)	87 kg (192 lb)	350 cm (140 in)	335 cm (132 in)	(Turkey) Arkas Spor
77	Yiğit Savaş Kaplan	10 January 2004	2.07 m (6 ft 9 in)	90 kg (200 lb)	365 cm (144 in)	340 cm (130 in)	(Turkey) İstanbul Gençlik S.K

=== Former coaches ===
Dates	Name
1958–1959	(Romania) Nicolae Sotir
1966	(Romania) Nicolae Murafa
1970–1971	(Bulgaria) Kosta Shapov
2006–2008	(Latvia) Gennady Parshin
2008–2010	(Italy) Fausto Polidori
2010–2013	(France) Veljko Bašić
2013–2016	(Italy) Emanuele Zanini
2017	(North Macedonia) Joško Milenkoski
2018–2022	(Turkey) Nedim Özbey
2023	(Italy) Alberto Giuliani
2024	(France) Cédric Énard
2025	(Turkey) Umut Çakır
2025–present	(Serbia) Slobodan Kovač

=== Former squads ===
- 2010 European League — Silver Medal
  Volkan Güç, Enver Kıdoğlu, Sinan Cem Tanık, Selçuk Keskin, Hasan Yeşilbudak, Arslan Ekşi, Rahmi Çağlar Aksoy, Erhan Dünge, Kadir Cin, Serhat Coşkun, Cüneyt Dağcı, Emre Batur, Burutay Subaşı, Kemal Kuvanç Elgaz, Ahmet Pezük, Zafer Ceyhun Tendar, Ramazan Serkan Kılıç, Ufuk Minici, Fatih Cihan, Berkan Bozan, Mustafa Koç, Özer Özger, Mustafa Kırıcı and Sabit Karaağaç. Head coach: (France) Veljko Bašić
- 2012 European League — Silver Medal
  Ulaş Kıyak, Murat Yenipazar, Ahmet Pezük, Kemal Kıvanç Elgaz, Gökhan Gökgöz, Emin Gök, Burutay Subaşı, Serhat Coşkun, Halil İbrahim Yücel, Emre Batur, Murathan Kısal, Ramazan Serkan Kılıç, Berkan Bozan, Baturalp Burak Güngör, Alperay Demirciler, Shoyo Hinita, Arslan Ekşi, Sabit Karaağaç, Selçuk Keskin, Serkan Oğuz, Ali Berke Sağır, Sinan Cem Tanık, Resul Tekeli and Koray Şahin. Head coach: (France) Veljko Bašić

== See also ==
  - Men's
- Turkey Men's national volleyball team
- Turkey Men's national volleyball team U23
- Turkey Men's national volleyball team U21
- Turkey Men's national volleyball team U19
  - Women's
- Turkey Women's national volleyball team
- Turkey Women's national volleyball team U23
- Turkey Women's national volleyball team U20
- Turkey Women's national volleyball team U18
