= 1987 Men's European Volleyball Championship =

Tournament details
- Host country: Belgium
- Dates: September 25–October 3
- Teams: 12
- Venues: 2 (in 2 host cities)

Final positions
- Champions: Soviet Union (11th title)

The 1987 Men's European Volleyball Championship was the fifteenth edition of the event, organized by Europe's governing volleyball body, the Confédération Européenne de Volleyball. It was hosted in Auderghem and Ghent, Belgium from September 25 to October 3, 1987.

== Teams ==
Group A – Auderghem

- France
- Italy
- Netherlands
- Romania
- Soviet Union
- Yugoslavia

Group B – Ghent

- Belgium
- Bulgaria
- Czechoslovakia
- Greece
- Spain
- Sweden

== Preliminary round ==
=== Group A ===
	Team	Points	G	W	L	PW	PL	Ratio	SW	SL	Ratio
1.	Soviet Union	10	5	5	0	258	174	1.483	15	4	3.750
2.	France	9	5	4	1	242	167	1.449	13	4	3.250
3.	Netherlands	7	5	2	3	223	199	1.121	9	9	1.000
4.	Yugoslavia	7	5	2	3	174	230	0.757	6	11	0.545
5.	Italy	6	5	1	4	246	268	0.918	8	13	0.615
6.	Romania	6	5	1	4	150	255	0.588	4	14	0.286

=== Group B ===
	Team	Points	G	W	L	PW	PL	Ratio	SW	SL	Ratio
1.	Sweden	9	5	4	1	212	219	0.968	12	7	1.714
2.	Greece	9	5	4	1	271	223	1.215	13	8	1.625
3.	Czechoslovakia	8	5	3	2	263	253	1.040	13	9	1.444
4.	Belgium	7	5	2	3	234	204	1.147	10	9	1.111
5.	Bulgaria	7	5	2	3	238	224	1.063	9	10	0.900
6.	Spain	5	5	0	5	142	237	0.599	1	15	0.066

== Final round ==
Semi-finals
1987-10-02 – Ghent
France	3
Sweden	0
1987-10-02 – Ghent
Soviet Union	3
Greece	0

Final
1987-10-01 – Ghent
France	1
Soviet Union	3
3rd place
1987-10-01 – Ghent
Sweden	2
Greece	3

5-8th place
1987-10-02 – Ghent
Czechoslovakia	3
Yugoslavia	2
1987-10-02 – Ghent
Netherlands	3
Belgium	2

5th place
1987-10-03 – Ghent
Czechoslovakia	0
Netherlands	3
7th place
1987-10-03 – Ghent
Yugoslavia	0
Belgium	3

9-12th place
1987-10-02 – Ghent
Italy	3
Spain	1
1987-10-02 – Ghent
Romania	3
Bulgaria	0

9th place
1987-10-03 – Ghent
Italy	3
Romania	0
11th place
1987-10-03 – Ghent
Spain	0
Bulgaria	3

== Final ranking ==
Place	Team
1st place, gold medalist(s)	Soviet Union
2nd place, silver medalist(s)	France
3rd place, bronze medalist(s)	Greece
4	Sweden
5	Netherlands
6	Czechoslovakia
7	Belgium
8	Yugoslavia
9	Italy
10	Romania
11	Bulgaria
12	Spain

1987 Men's European champions

Soviet Union
Eleventh title
