= Mladen Kašić =

Croatian volleyball player (born 1958)

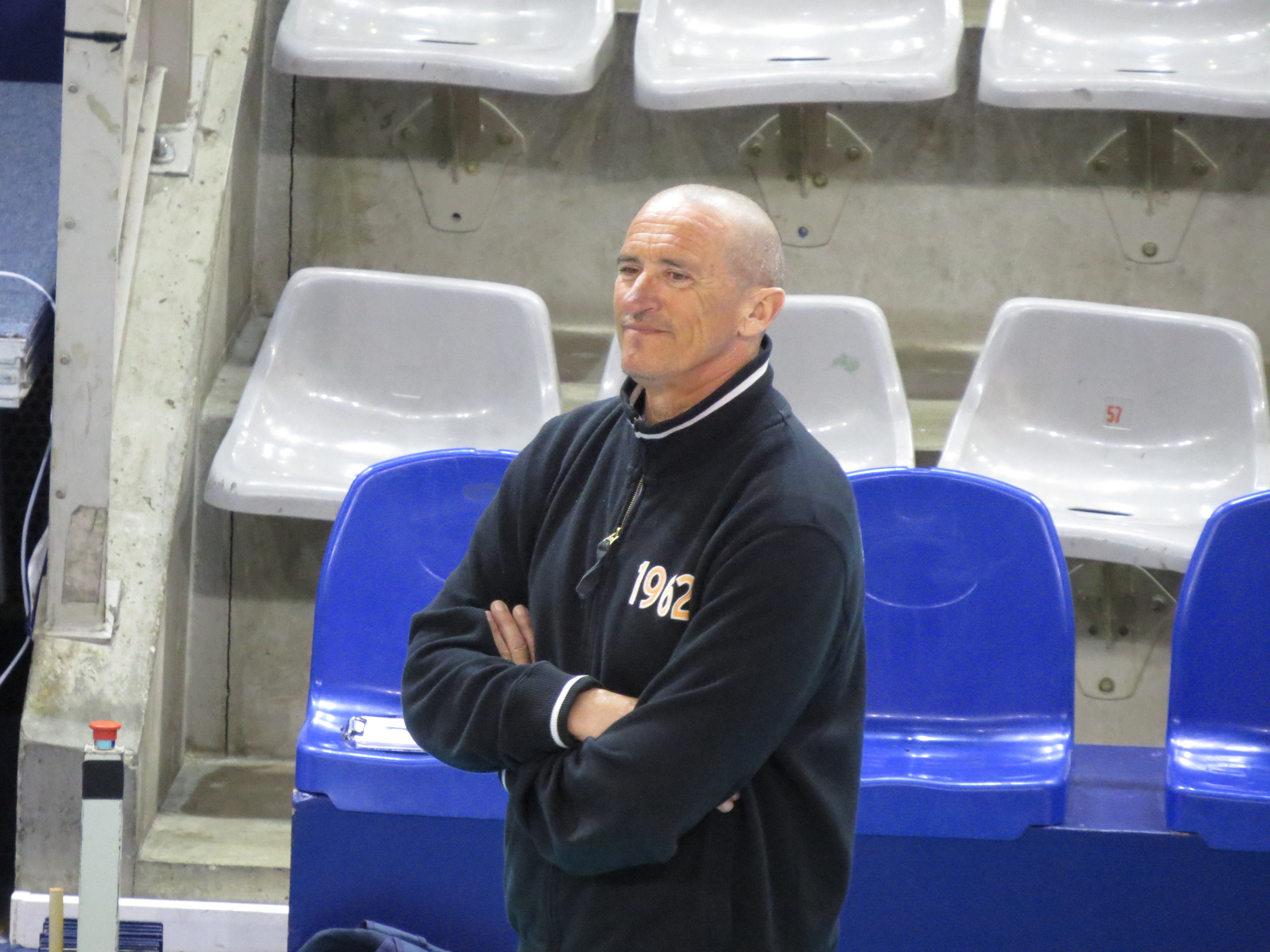
- Mladen Kašić in 2017

Personal information
- Nationality: Croatian
- Born: 8 September 1958 (age 66); Sisak, Yugoslavia

Sport
- Sport: Volleyball

Mladen Kašić (born 8 September 1958) is a Croatian volleyball player. He competed in the men's tournament at the 1980 Summer Olympics.
