= Boro Jović =

Yugoslav volleyball player (born 1954)

Personal information
- Nationality: Yugoslav
- Born: 30 June 1954 (age 72)

Sport
- Sport: Volleyball

Boro Jović (born 30 June 1954) is a Yugoslav volleyball player. He competed in the men's tournament at the 1980 Summer Olympics. He first played volleyball in 1970 and later made the senior national team in 1977.
