= Goran Srbinovski =

Yugoslav volleyball player (born 1956)

Personal information
- Nationality: Yugoslav Macedonian
- Born: 14 August 1956 (age 70)

Sport
- Sport: Volleyball

Goran Srbinovski (born 14 August 1956) is a Yugoslav volleyball player from Skopje, North Macedonia. He competed in the men's tournament at the 1980 Summer Olympics.
