= Slobodan Lozančić =

Yugoslav volleyball player (born 1955)

Personal information
- Nationality: Yugoslav
- Born: 8 April 1955 (age 69)

Sport
- Sport: Volleyball

Slobodan Lozančić (born 8 April 1955) is a Yugoslav volleyball player. He competed in the men's tournament at the 1980 Summer Olympics.
