= Volleyball at the 1993 Mediterranean Games =

== Medalists ==
Event	Gold	Silver	Bronze
Men's Competition	France	Spain	Turkey
Women's Competition	Croatia	France	Turkey

== Standings ==
=== Men's Competition ===
Rank	Team
1st place, gold medalist(s)	France
2nd place, silver medalist(s)	Spain
3rd place, bronze medalist(s)	Turkey
4	Greece
5	Algeria
6	Bosnia and Herzegovina
7	Slovenia
8	Albania

=== Women's Competition ===
Rank	Team
1st place, gold medalist(s)	Croatia
2nd place, silver medalist(s)	France
3rd place, bronze medalist(s)	Turkey
4	Greece
5	Spain
6	Slovenia
