= Miodrag Mitić =

Yugoslav volleyball player (1959–2022)

Personal information
- Nationality: Yugoslav
- Born: 15 September 1959; Veliko Gradište, PR Serbia, FPR Yugoslavia
- Died: 7 February 2022 (aged 62); Veliko Gradište, Serbia

Sport
- Sport: Volleyball

Miodrag Mitić (15 September 1959 – 7 February 2022) was a Yugoslav volleyball player. He competed in the men's tournament at the 1980 Summer Olympics. Mitić died on 7 February 2022, at the age of 62.

Mitić attended the Faculty of Medicine at the University of Belgrade and after graduation worked as a specialist in physiology. At the 2012 Summer Olympics, he served as team physician for the Serbian women's national team, and his son Mihajlo Mitić was part of the Serbian men's team squad.
