= Ljubomir Travica =

Serbian volleyball player and coach

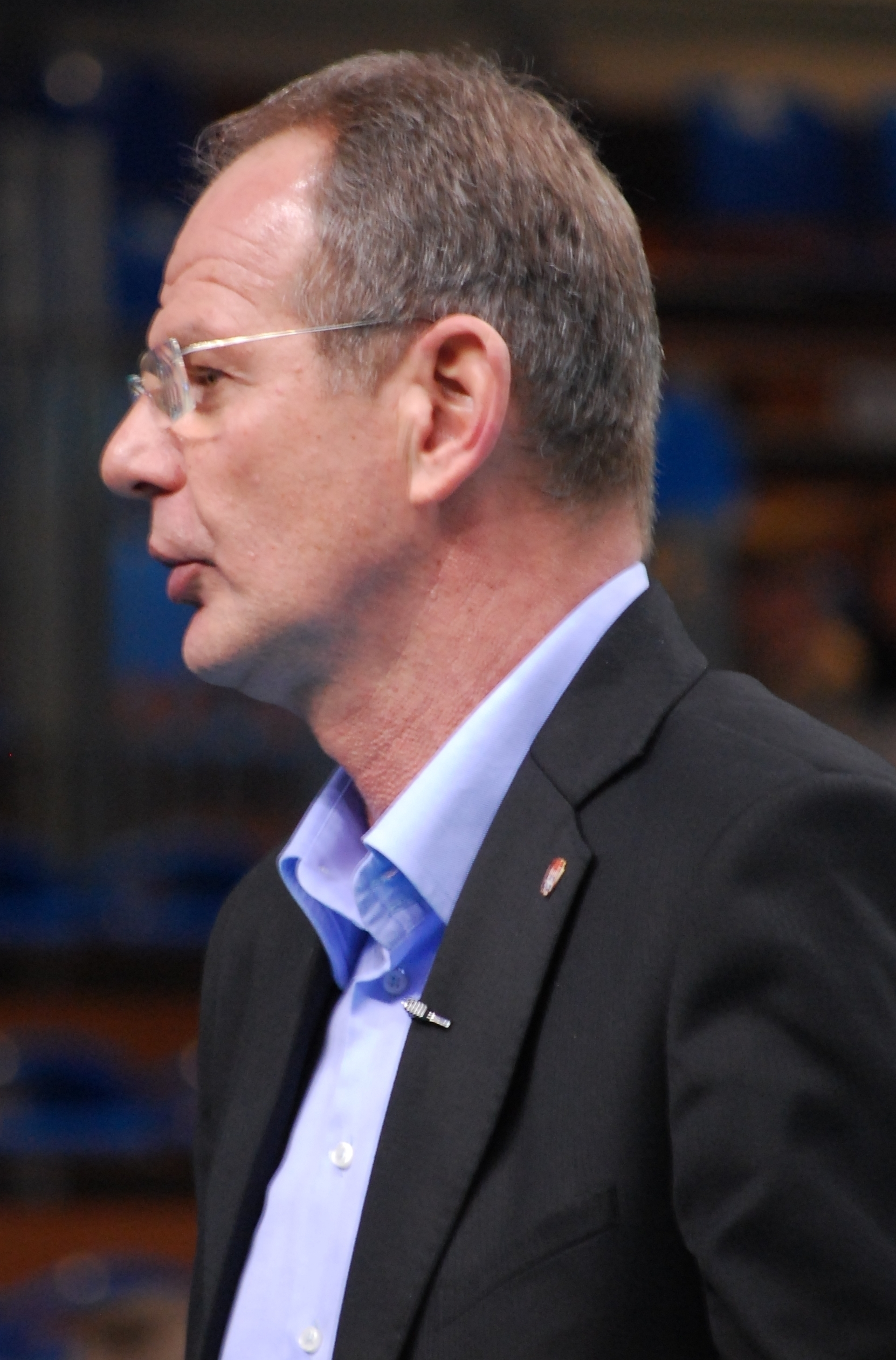

Personal information
- Born: 1 October 1954 (age 72); Ervenik, PR Croatia, FPR Yugoslavia
- Height: 1.97 m (6 ft 6 in)

Coaching information
Previous teams coached
Years	Teams
1991–1992; 1992–1993; 1993–1994; 1994–1995; 1995–1996; 1996–1997; 1997–1998; 1998–1999; 1999–2000; 2000–2001; 2001–2002; 2002–2004; 2003–2006; 2004–2005; 2005–2006; 2006–2007; 2007–2008; 2008–2011; 2012–2013; 2015–2016; 2016-2017; 2018-2019; 2018–2019; 2019–2023; 2023–2024; 2025; 2025–2026	Effedì Valdagno; Spal Ferrara; Latte Giglio Reggio Emilia; Olio Venturi Spoleto; TNT Traco Catania; Colmark Brescia; Olio Venturi Spoleto; Volley Gonzaga Milano; Gabeca Pallavolo; Domino Palermo Volley; Pallavolo Parma; Olympiacos; Serbia and Montenegro; Volley Piacenza; Top Volley Latina; Materdomini Volley; Volley Callipo; Asseco Resovia; Al Rayyan; El Jaish; Shahrdari Urmia; Macedonia; Yenisei Krasnoyarsk; ES Tunis; Prisma Volley; Gas Sales Piacenza; Norwid Częstochowa

Volleyball information
- Position: Outside hitter

Career
Years	Teams
1982–1983; 1983–1984; 1984–1985; 1985–1989; 1989–1990	Mladost Zagreb; Modena Volley; Di.Po. Vimercate; Pallavolo Padova; Gividì Milano

National team
Yugoslavia
Honours
Men's volleyball
Head coach Serbia and Montenegro
FIVB World Cup
Bronze medal – third place	2003 Japan
FIVB World League
Silver medal – second place	2005 Belgrade
Bronze medal – third place	2004 Rome
CEV European Championship
Bronze medal – third place	2005 Italy/Serbia and Montenegro

Ljubomir Travica (Serbian Cyrillic: Љубомир Травица; born 1 October 1954) is a professional volleyball coach and former player from former Yugoslavia.

His son, Dragan is a professional volleyball player, a former member of the Italy national team.

== Career ==
Travica was born in Ervenik and started his career with Mladost Zagreb. In 1980, he participated with Yugoslavia at the 1980 Summer Olympics held in Moscow.

He moved to Italy in 1983, and during his career, played for Panini Modena and Padova in Serie A1 (Italy's top division), and Vimercate and Brugherio in Serie A2. In 1991, he started his coaching career in Serie B1 in Valdagno, and subsequently coached different teams in the A1 and A2 divisions, before moving to Olympiacos Piraeus in Greece. From 2008 to 2011, Travica coached Asseco Resovia in Poland.

== Honours ==
=== As a player ===
- CEV Challenge Cup
  - 1983–84 – with Panini Modena

=== As a coach ===
- AVC Asian Club Championship
  - Iran 2013 – with Al Rayyan
- CAVB African Club Championship
  - Tunis 2021 – with ES Tunis
- Domestic
  - 2002–03 Greek Championship, with Olympiacos
  - 2008–09 Polish Championship, with Asseco Resovia
  - 2012–13 Emir Cup, with Al Rayyan
  - 2012–13 Qatari Championship, with Al Rayyan
  - 2020–21 Tunisian Cup, with ES Tunis
  - 2020–21 Tunisian Championship, with ES Tunis
