= Vladimir Trifunović =

Yugoslav volleyball player (born 1958)

Personal information
- Nationality: Yugoslav
- Born: 14 June 1958 (age 66)

Sport
- Sport: Volleyball

Vladimir Trifunović (born 14 June 1958) is a Yugoslav volleyball player. He competed in the men's tournament at the 1980 Summer Olympics.
