= Radovan Malević =

Serbian volleyball player (born 1957)

Personal information
- Nationality: Serbian
- Born: 29 May 1957 (age 67); Valjevo, Yugoslavia

Sport
- Sport: Volleyball

Radovan Malević (born 29 May 1957) is a Serbian volleyball player. He competed in the men's tournament at the 1980 Summer Olympics.
