= Volleyball at the 1979 Mediterranean Games =

In the 1979 Mediterranean Games, one of the games played was volleyball. Yugoslavia won the men's division and Italy won the women's division.

== Medalists ==
Event	Gold	Silver	Bronze
Men's Competition	Yugoslavia	Greece	France
Women's Competition	Italy	Yugoslavia	France

== Standings ==
=== Men's competition ===
Rank	Team
1st place, gold medalist(s)	Yugoslavia
2nd place, silver medalist(s)	Greece
3rd place, bronze medalist(s)	France
4	Italy
5	Egypt
6	Spain
7	Turkey
8	Algeria

=== Women's competition ===
Rank	Team
1st place, gold medalist(s)	Italy
2nd place, silver medalist(s)	Yugoslavia
3rd place, bronze medalist(s)	France
4	Turkey
5	Spain
6	Egypt
