= Zdravko Kuljić =

Yugoslav volleyball player (born 1953)

Personal information
- Nationality: Yugoslav
- Born: 4 March 1953 (age 72)

Sport
- Sport: Volleyball

Zdravko Kuljić (born 4 March 1953) is a Yugoslav volleyball player. He competed in the men's tournament at the 1980 Summer Olympics.
