= Volleyball at the 1983 Mediterranean Games =

In the 1983 Mediterranean Games, one of the games played was volleyball. Italy won the men's division and also won the women's division.

== Medalists ==
Event	Gold	Silver	Bronze
Men's Competition	Italy	France	Greece
Women's Competition	Italy	France	Yugoslavia

== Standings ==
=== Men's competition ===
Rank	Team
1st place, gold medalist(s)	Italy
2nd place, silver medalist(s)	France
3rd place, bronze medalist(s)	Greece
4	Yugoslavia
5	Egypt
6	Spain
7	Turkey
8	Algeria
9	Tunisia
10	Morocco

=== Women's competition ===
Rank	Team
1st place, gold medalist(s)	Italy
2nd place, silver medalist(s)	France
3rd place, bronze medalist(s)	Yugoslavia
4	Morocco
5	Turkey
6	Algeria
7	Greece
