= Volleyball at the 1959 Mediterranean Games =

In the 1959 Mediterranean Games, one of the games played was volleyball. Italy won the men's division. France came 2nd.

== Medalists ==
Event	Gold	Silver	Bronze
Men's Competition	Italy	Turkey	Lebanon

== Standings ==
Men's competition

Rank	Team
1st place, gold medalist(s)	Italy
2nd place, silver medalist(s)	Turkey
3rd place, bronze medalist(s)	Lebanon
4	United Arab Republic
