= Volleyball at the 1991 Mediterranean Games =

Volleyball at the 1991 Mediterranean Games was held in Athens, Greece from June 11 to July 12, 1991.

== Medalists ==
Event	Gold	Silver	Bronze
Men's Competition	Italy	Yugoslavia	Spain
Women's Competition	Italy	Turkey	Greece

== Standings ==
=== Men's competition ===
Rank	Team
1st place, gold medalist(s)	Italy
2nd place, silver medalist(s)	Yugoslavia
3rd place, bronze medalist(s)	Spain
4	France
5	Greece
6	Turkey
7	Albania
8	Algeria

=== Women's competition ===
Rank	Team
1st place, gold medalist(s)	Italy
2nd place, silver medalist(s)	Turkey
3rd place, bronze medalist(s)	Greece
4	Albania
5	France
6	Spain
7	Egypt
