= Volleyball at the 1975 Mediterranean Games =

In the 1975 Mediterranean Games, one of the games played was volleyball. Yugoslavia won the men's and the women's division.

== Medalists ==
Event	Gold	Silver	Bronze
Men's Competition	Yugoslavia	Italy	France
Women's Competition	Yugoslavia	Italy	Turkey

== Standings ==
=== Men's competition ===
Rank	Team
1st place, gold medalist(s)	Yugoslavia
2nd place, silver medalist(s)	Italy
3rd place, bronze medalist(s)	France
4	Greece
5	Turkey
6	Egypt
7	Spain
8	Morocco

=== Women's competition ===
Rank	Team
1st place, gold medalist(s)	Yugoslavia
2nd place, silver medalist(s)	Italy
3rd place, bronze medalist(s)	Turkey
4	Egypt
5	Algeria
