= Volleyball at the 1963 Mediterranean Games =

In the 1963 Mediterranean Games, one of the games played was volleyball. Yugoslavia won the men's division.

== Medalists ==
Event	Gold	Silver	Bronze
Men's Competition	Yugoslavia	Italy	Turkey

== Standings ==
Men's competition

Rank	Team
1st place, gold medalist(s)	Yugoslavia
2nd place, silver medalist(s)	Italy
3rd place, bronze medalist(s)	Turkey
4	United Arab Republic
5	Morocco
