= Volleyball at the 1997 Mediterranean Games =

== Standings ==
=== Men's Competition ===
Rank	Team
1st place, gold medalist(s)	France
2nd place, silver medalist(s)	Turkey
3rd place, bronze medalist(s)	Croatia
4	Italy

=== Women's Competition ===
Rank	Team
1st place, gold medalist(s)	Italy
2nd place, silver medalist(s)	Turkey
3rd place, bronze medalist(s)	France
4	Yugoslavia
