= Volleyball at the 1987 Mediterranean Games =

Sport event

Volleyball was played at the 1987 Mediterranean Games. Spain won the men's division and Albania won the women's.

== Medalists ==
Event	Gold	Silver	Bronze
Men's Competition	Spain	Turkey	Italy
Women's Competition	Albania	Turkey	Italy

== Standings ==
=== Men's competition ===
Rank	Team
1st place, gold medalist(s)	Spain
2nd place, silver medalist(s)	Turkey
3rd place, bronze medalist(s)	Italy
4	Syria
5	Tunisia
6	Greece
7	Lebanon
8	Cyprus

=== Women's competition ===
Rank	Team
1st place, gold medalist(s)	Albania
2nd place, silver medalist(s)	Turkey
3rd place, bronze medalist(s)	Italy
4	Greece
5	Syria
6	Lebanon
