= Sport in Montenegro =

Sport in Montenegro revolves mostly around team sports, such as football, basketball, handball, and volleyball. Other sports involved are boxing, tennis, swimming, judo, karate, athletics, table tennis, and chess.

Water polo is the most popular sport in Montenegro, and is considered the national sport. The Montenegro men's national water polo team, one of the top ranked teams in the world, won the gold medal at the 2008 Men's European Water Polo Championship in Málaga, Spain, as well as the gold medal at the 2009 FINA Men's Water Polo World League, which was held in the Montenegrin capital, Podgorica. The Montenegrin team PVK Primorac from Kotor became the European champion at the LEN Euroleague 2009 in Rijeka, Croatia.

Football is the second most popular sport in Montenegro. Notable football players from Montenegro are Dejan Savićević, Predrag Mijatović, Mirko Vučinić, Stefan Savić and Stevan Jovetić. Montenegro national football team, founded in 2006, played in the playoffs for UEFA Euro 2012, which is the biggest success in the history of the national team.

The Montenegro national basketball team is also known for good performances and had won a lot of medals in the past as part of the Yugoslavia national basketball team. In 2006, the Basketball Federation of Montenegro along with this team joined the International Basketball Federation (FIBA) on its own, following the Independence of Montenegro. Montenegro participated on two Eurobaskets until now.

Among women's sports, the national handball team is the most successful, having won the 2012 European Championship and finishing as runners-up at the 2012 Summer Olympics. ŽRK Budućnost Podgorica won EHF Champions League twice.

== National competitions ==
=== Leagues and Cups ===
Out of all the leagues and other national competitions in Montenegro, the most popular are football, basketball, handball, volleyball and water polo. Before independence, Montenegrin clubs played in the competitions of SFR Yugoslavia, FR Yugoslavia and Serbia and Montenegro. After 2006, Montenegrin sports federations founded their own national leagues and cups.

At the end of every season, champions and Cup winners from the Montenegro national competitions play in European competitions. Many of them have performed well in European cups, particularly in basketball, women's handball, water polo and volleyball. Before independence, Montenegrin clubs won titles in Yugoslavian competitions, and the especially successful clubs included KK Budućnost Podgorica, ŽRK Budućnost Podgorica, RK Lovćen and PVK Jadran.

Below is a list of all leagues and cups in Montenegro.

Sport	Competitions	Most successful club(s)	
Football (men)	Montenegrin First League	FK Sutjeska	4
Football (men)	Montenegrin Second League	FK Bokelj	2
Football (men)	Montenegrin Third League	FK Pljevlja	4
Football (men)	Montenegrin Cup	FK Rudar	4
Football (men)	Montenegrin Regional Cups	FK Pljevlja	5
Football (women)	Montenegrin Women's League	ŽFK Ekonomist	4
Football (women)	Montenegrin Women's Cup	ŽFK Ekonomist	2
Basketball (men)	Prva A Liga	KK Budućnost	12
Basketball (men)	Prva B Liga	KK ABS Primorje	3
Basketball (men)	Montenegrin Basketball Cup	KK Budućnost	13
Basketball (women)	Women's Basketball League	ŽKK Budućnost	10
Basketball (women)	Montenegrin Women's Basketball Cup	ŽKK Budućnost	10
Handball (men)	Montenegrin First League of Men's Handball	RK Lovćen	7
Handball (men)	Montenegrin Second League of Men's Handball	RK Rudar	2
Handball (men)	Montenegrin Men's Handball Cup	RK Lovćen	9
Handball (women)	Montenegrin First League of Women's Handball	ŽRK Budućnost	13
Handball (women)	Montenegrin Women's Handball Cup	ŽRK Budućnost	13
Volleyball (men)	Montenegrin Volleyball League	OK Budvanska Rivijera	8
Volleyball (men)	Montenegrin volleyball Cup	OK Budvanska Rivijera	7
Volleyball (women)	Montenegrin women's volley league	ŽOK Luka Bar	10
Volleyball (women)	Montenegrin women's volleyball Cup	ŽOK Luka Bar	7
Water polo	Montenegrin First League of Water Polo	PVK Jadran	9
Water polo	Montenegrin Second League of Water Polo	VPK Bokelj	6
Water polo	Montenegrin Water Polo Cup	PVK Jadran	11

==== Football ====
===== Men =====
The most successful clubs in domestic Montenegrin football competitions are FK Budućnost Podgorica and FK Sutjeska Nikšić, each with four Montenegrin First League titles, however Budućnost have won more Montenegrin Cups. (See: List of Montenegrin First League champions and List of Montenegrin Cup winners)

===== Women =====
Women's football is the newest of all team sports in Montenegro. The first national competition was held in 2008, and the most successful club is ŽFK Ekonomist Nikšić with five league titles and one cup.(See: List of Montenegrin Women's League champions and Montenegrin Women's Cup winners)

==== Water polo ====
During the era of SFR Yugoslavia, the first national titles won by Montenegrin clubs were in water polo. There are three extremely successful water polo clubs from Montenegro - PVK Jadran Herceg Novi, VK Primorac Kotor and VK Budva. All of those clubs are holders of both national trophies - from Yugoslavian and from Montenegrin competitions. As well as that, VK Primorac have been a champion of Europe. (See: List of Montenegrin First League of Water Polo champions and List of Montenegrin Water Polo Cup winners)

==== Handball ====
===== Men =====
RK Lovćen Cetinje is the most successful Montenegrin men's handball club with titles from the former Yugoslavia to their name. As well as them, six other clubs have won the national trophies since 2006. (See: List of Montenegrin Handball First League champions and List of Montenegrin Men's Handball Cup winners)

===== Women =====
The most successful Montenegrin club is ŽRK Budućnost Podgorica. It's one of two clubs from Montenegro that have won European competitions in team sports (twice), and the only club to have won Montenegrin women's handball league titles. ŽRK Budućnost is the all-time most successful club in SFR Yugoslavia, FR Yugoslavia and Montenegro. (See: List of Montenegrin Women's Handball League champions and List of Montenegrin Women's Handball Cup winners)

==== Basketball ====
===== Men =====
Among Montenegrin basketball clubs, the most successful is KK Budućnost Podgorica, who have many titles of Yugoslavia and Montenegro, with a few successful seasons in FIBA and ULEB Euroleague. KK Budućnost have won every league title ever since Montenegrin independence and three titles in the former Yugoslavia. KK Sutjeska Nikšić have won one cup, whilst all the others were won by KK Budućnost. (See: List of Prva A Liga champions and List of Montenegrin Basketball Cup winners)

===== Women =====
The most successful women's basketball club is ŽKK Budućnost Podgorica, who are the only Montenegrin team with titles from the Yugoslav League. As well as Budućnost, other successful teams are ŽKK Jedinstvo Bijelo Polje. (See: List of Montenegrin Women's Basketball League champions and List of Montenegrin Women's Basketball Cup winners)

==== Volleyball ====
===== Men =====
OK Budvanska Rivijera Budva and OK Budućnost were two most successful Montenegrin volleyball clubs in former Yugoslav competitions. Since 2006, those two teams have dominated in Montenegrin competitions too, but the team with the most trophies out of the two is Budvanska Rivijera. (See: List of Montenegrin Volleyball League champions and List of Montenegrin volleyball Cup winners)

===== Women =====
Among Montenegrin women's volleyball clubs, four have won at least one national trophy. The most successful club is ŽOK Luka Bar, who was the only Montenegrin club that participated in Yugoslav elite competitions, too. (See: List of Montenegrin Women's Volleyball League champions and List of Montenegrin Women's Volleyball Cup winners)

=== Main rivalries and derbies ===
In every sport, there is one big rivalry in Montenegro. The biggest rivalry across any sport is the football rivalry between FK Budućnost Podgorica and FK Sutjeska Nikšić, known as the Montenegrin Derby. Other traditional football rivalries are between FK Budućnost and FK Lovćen Cetinje, because the two clubs have been playing games against each other since the 1920s. Between 2000 and 2009, there was a huge interest for the Podgorica rivalry between FK Budućnost and FK Zeta, and between 2008 and 2014 there was another important local derby in the Montenegrin First League, between two teams from Nikšić - FK Sutjeska and FK Čelik Nikšić. Since independence in 2006, one of the most important games are matches between FK Budućnost and FK Rudar Pljevlja.

The main derby in basketball is between KK Budućnost Podgorica and KK Sutjeska Nikšić. During the 90's, there was another Montenegrin basketball derby between KK Budućnost and KK Lovćen Cetinje.

The main handball derby in Montenegro is between RK Lovćen Cetinje and RK Berane. There is also a rivalry between RK Lovćen and RK Budućnost Podgorica.

Since the 90's, OK Budućnost Podgorica and OK Budvanska Rivijera Budva have been playing the Montenegrin volleyball derby. Around the turn of the century in 2001, a derby game in Podgorica recorded the highest all-time attendance in the Yugoslav volleyball league (7,500).

The main Montenegrin water polo derby is between VK Primorac Kotor and PVK Jadran Herceg Novi.

== Montenegrin clubs in European and ragional competitions ==
During the every season, Montenegrin clubs in every team-sport are participating in European competitions. Most successful were teams in women's handball and men's water polo, who won the titles of Champion of Europe. Except that sports, Montenegrin teams are playing in European competitions in football (men, women), handball, basketball (men, women), volleyball (men, women) and similar sports.

At the beginning of the 21st century, on the territory of former Yugoslavia started process of founding regional sport leagues. Montenegrin clubs were among the founders of all regional competitions, and today they are participating in ABA League, WABA League, SEHA League, Women's Regional Handball League and Adriatic Water Polo League. An exception is Balkans Cup in football, a regional tournament that was held earlier—between the 1960s and 90s.

=== Notable results ===
Among the notable results and successes of Montenegrin clubs in European competitions are following seasons;

Season	Sport	Competition	Montenegrin team	Result
1984–85	Handball	Cup Winners' Cup	ŽRK Budućnost Podgorica	WINNERS
1985–86	Handball	EHF Champions League	ŽRK Budućnost Podgorica	Semifinals
1986–87	Water polo	LEN Champions League	VK Primorac Kotor	Semifinals
1986–87	Handball	EHF Cup	ŽRK Budućnost Podgorica	WINNERS
1996–97	Water polo	LEN Cup Winners' Cup	VK Budva	Semifinals
1997–98	Handball	EHF Champions League	ŽRK Budućnost Podgorica	Semifinals
1998–99	Basketball	FIBA Saporta Cup	KK Budućnost Podgorica	Semifinals
1998–99	Handball	Cities Cup	RK Lovćen Cetinje	Quarterfinals
1998–99	Handball	EHF Champions League	ŽRK Budućnost Podgorica	Semifinals
1999–00	Basketball	EuroLeague	KK Budućnost Podgorica	Round of 16
1999–00	Handball	EHF Cup	RK Lovćen Cetinje	Quarterfinals
1999–00	Handball	EHF Champions League	ŽRK Budućnost Podgorica	Semifinals
2000–01	Basketball	EuroLeague	KK Budućnost Podgorica	Round of 16
2000–01	Handball	EHF Champions League	RK Lovćen Cetinje	Quarterfinals
2000–01	Handball	EHF Champions League	ŽRK Budućnost Podgorica	Semifinals
2001–02	Water polo	LEN Cup Winners' Cup	PVK Jadran Herceg Novi	Semifinals
2001–02	Handball	EHF Champions League	ŽRK Budućnost Podgorica	Semifinals
2003–04	Water polo	LEN Champions League	PVK Jadran Herceg Novi	FINAL
2005–06	Handball	Cup Winners' Cup	ŽRK Budućnost Podgorica	WINNERS
2006–07	Handball	Challenge Cup	RK Lovćen Cetinje	Quarterfinals
2006–07	Water polo	LEN Euro Cup	VK Budva	Semifinals
2007–08	Volleyball	CEV Cup	OK Budvanska Rivijera Budva	Semifinals
2007–08	Water polo	LEN Euro Cup	VK Budva	Semifinals
2008–09	Water polo	LEN Champions League	VK Primorac Kotor	WINNERS
2008–09	Handball	Challenge Cup	RK Budućnost Podgorica	Quarterfinals
2009–10	Water polo	LEN Champions League	VK Primorac Kotor	FINAL
2009–10	Water polo	LEN Euro Cup	VA Cattaro Kotor	WINNERS
2009–10	Handball	Cup Winners' Cup	ŽRK Budućnost Podgorica	WINNERS
2010–11	Handball	EHF Champions League	ŽRK Budućnost Podgorica	Semifinals
2010–11	Water polo	LEN Champions League	VK Budva	Semifinals
2010–11	Volleyball	CEV Champions League	OK Budvanska Rivijera Budva	Quarterfinals
2011–12	Basketball	EuroCup	KK Budućnost Podgorica	Quarterfinals
2011–12	Handball	EHF Champions League	ŽRK Budućnost Podgorica	WINNERS
2012–13	Football	UEFA Europa League	FK Zeta Golubovci	Playoff round
2012–13	Basketball	EuroCup	KK Budućnost Podgorica	Quarterfinals
2013–14	Handball	EHF Champions League	ŽRK Budućnost Podgorica	FINAL
2013–14	Volleyball	CEV Champions League	OK Budvanska Rivijera Budva	Quarterfinals
2014–15	Handball	EHF Champions League	ŽRK Budućnost Podgorica	WINNERS
2015–16	Handball	EHF Champions League	ŽRK Budućnost Podgorica	Semifinals
2016–17	Handball	EHF Champions League	ŽRK Budućnost Podgorica	Semifinals
2017–18	Basketball	EuroCup	KK Budućnost Podgorica	Quarterfinals
2018–19	Basketball	Euroleague	KK Budućnost Podgorica	15th

=== Football ===
==== Men's competitions ====
During the history, Montenegrin football clubs played in three different UEFA competitions for clubs - UEFA Champions League, UEFA Europa League (formerly UEFA Cup) and Intertoto Cup. Champions of Montenegro never played in the group-phase of UEFA Champions League, and most successful in the qualifiers was FK Zeta Golubovci at season 2007–08. Best performances in UEFA Europa League had FK Zeta who played in the playoffs, and FK Mladost Podgorica and FK Budućnost, which played in Round 3. Most successful in Intertoto Cup was FK Budućnost Podgorica.

Balkans Cup is a former regional football competition (1960–1994) in which Montenegrin clubs participated as a representatives of SFR Yugoslavia. Teams from Montenegro that played in Balkans Cup were FK Budućnost Podgorica and FK Sutjeska Nikšić. Biggest success made FK Budućnost, who played in the final 1991, after eliminated Galatasaray SK.

==== Women's competitions ====
Since the season 2012–13, champion of Montenegrin Women's League is playing in the UEFA Women's Champions League. In the period 2012–2015, the only Montenegrin representative was ŽFK Ekonomist. On season 2016–17, for the first time, Montenegro was represented in UEFA Champions League by ŽFK Breznica.

=== Water polo ===
Montenegrin water polo clubs are participating in the LEN competitions since the season 1986–97. First team that ever competed at the European cups was VK Primorac Kotor. Except them, in LEN competitions played also PVK Jadran Herceg Novi, VK Budva, VA Cattaro Kotor and PVK Val Prčanj. Biggest success in the history of Montenegrin waterpolo made VK Primorac, who won the title in LEN Champions League 2009. Except them, another Montenegrin holder of European trophy is VA Cattaro.

Clubs from Montenegro were among the founders of Adriatic Water Polo League, which is established at 2008. Since its first season, Montenegrin sides were among the most successful participants of regional competition, and PVK Jadran Herceg Novi won two titles. Othed clubs from Montenegro that participated in Adriatic League are VK Primorac Kotor, VK Budva and VA Cattaro Kotor.

=== Handball ===
==== Men's competitions ====
Montenegrin men's handball clubs are participating in the EHF competitions since the season 1995/96. First team that ever competed at the European cups was Mornar Bar and most successful Montenegrin represent in the European competitions is Lovćen Cetinje. The other Montenegrin clubs that competed at the EHF competitions are Berane, Rudar Pljevlja, Budućnost Podgorica, Sutjeska Nikšić, Mojkovac and Budvanska rivijera Budva. The greatest result in the European cups made RK Lovćen during the season 2000/01. As a champion of FR Yugoslavia, Lovćen won fifth place in the EHF Champions League.

Southeastern European Handball Association League, or SEHA League is founded at 2011, and Montenegrin clubs were part of it since first season. Most successful Montenegrin representative in regional league was RK Lovćen.

==== Women's competitions ====
Montenegrin women's handball clubs are participating in the EHF competitions since the season 1984/85. Montenegrin side ŽRK Budućnost Podgorica was extremely successful in the European Cups and today is among the best and most-trophied European and global women's handball teams. They are most successful Montenegrin sports team in European Cups, too. ŽRK Budućnost won six European titles. Except ŽRK Budućnost, until today, representatives of Montenegro in women's EHF competitions were ŽRK Biseri Pljevlja, ŽRK Danilovgrad, ŽRK Nikšić and ŽRK Petrol Bonus Podgorica.

Women Regional Handball League (WRHL) is founded in 2009, and Montenegrin clubs are participating from its inaugural season. As one of strongest European clubs, ŽRK Budućnost Podgorica dominated in the history of competition, often playing seasons without any defeat. So, ŽRK Budućnost won five titles during the six seasons of WRHL.

=== Basketball ===
==== Men's competitions ====
Clubs from Montenegro have been playing in European basketball competitions since the 1980s. Until 2006, they represented SFR Yugoslavia and FR Yugoslavia. Almost all European seasons by Montenegrin clubs are played by KK Budućnost. Exceptions are a single-season parcitipations of KK Lovćen and KK Mornar in Europe. The most successful period was the end of the 1990s and the beginning of the new century. At that time, KK Budućnost played in the finish phases of EuroLeague. In that period, Budućnost often played games against greatest European basketball teams like FC Barcelona, Real Madrid, CSKA Moscow, Panathinaikos, Olympiacos, Maccabi Tel Aviv.

Today, Adriatic Basketball League is one of strongest in Europe. At 2001, one of founders was Montenegrin side KK Budućnost Podgorica, which is among most successful members of competition. Except Budućnost, in ABA League played three other clubs from Montenegro - KK Lovćen Cetinje, KK Sutjeska Nikšić and KK Mornar Bar. KK Budućnost played four times in the semifinal of ABA League playoffs, which is the most significant success of Montenegrin clubs in that competition until now.

==== Women's competitions ====
Women's basketball clubs from Montenegro participated in FIBA competitions since the start of century. Clubs that played in European Cups until today are ŽKK Budućnost Podgorica and ŽKK Jedinstvo Bijelo Polje. ŽKK Budućnost played in EuroLeague Women during the one season, but finished it after the group phase.

Women Adriatic Basketball League, or MŽRKL is founded at 2001, and Montenegrin clubs are part of it since 2004. Most successful Montenegrin representatives in WABA League were ŽKK Budućnost Podgorica and ŽKK Jedinstvo Bijelo Polje. While ŽKK Budućnost won champion title (2015–16), ŽKK Jedinstvo finished one season as a finalist in playoffs.

=== Volleyball ===
==== Men's competitions ====
Montenegrin volleyball clubs are participating in the CEV competitions since the season 1995–96. First team that ever competed at the European cups was OK Budućnost Podgorica. Except them, in CEV competitions played also OK Budvanska Rivijera Budva, OK Sutjeska Nikšić, OK Jedinstvo Bijelo Polje and OK Studentski Centar Podgorica. Among other competitions, OK Budućnost and OK Budvanska Rivijera played a numerous seasons in CEV Champions League, with few participations in the final phases of competition.

==== Women's competitions ====
Montenegrin women's volleyball clubs are participating in the CEV competitions since the season 1998–99. First team that ever competed at the European cups was ŽOK Luka Bar. Except them, in CEV competitions played also ŽOK Galeb Bar. Montenegrin women's volleyball teams played in Women's CEV Cup and CEV Women's Challenge Cup, and from the season 2016–17 in the qualifiers for CEV Women's Champions League.

== National sports teams ==
From 2006, following Montenegrin independence, sports associations of Montenegro founded their own national sports teams. In the period 2006–2007, all sports associations became full members of international sports bodies, including the International Olympic Committee, so teams of Montenegro started with performances in official World and European competitions.

=== Notable results ===
Among the notable results and successes of the Montenegro national teams at the main competitions includes:

Year	Sport	Team	Competition	Result
2008	Water Polo	Water Polo (Men's)	European Championship	Champion
2008	Water Polo	Water Polo (Men's)	Summer Olympics	4th
2011	Basketball	Basketball (Women's)	European Championship	6th
2012	Water Polo	Water Polo (Men's)	European Championship	Finalist
2012	Handball	Handball (Women's)	European Championship	Champion
2012	Handball	Handball (Women's)	Summer Olympics	Finalist
2012	Water Polo	Water Polo (Men's)	Summer Olympics	4th
2013	Water Polo	Water Polo (Men's)	World Championship	Finalist
2014	Handball	Handball (Women's)	European Championship	4th
2015	Basketball	Basketball (Women's)	European Championship	7th
2016	Water Polo	Water Polo (Men's)	European Championship	Finalist
2016	Water Polo	Water Polo (Men's)	Summer Olympics	4th
2017	Basketball	Basketball (Men's)	European Championship	13th
2019	Handball	Handball (Women's)	World Championship	4th
2020	Water Polo	Water Polo (Men's)	European Championship	3rd

=== Montenegro national football team ===
==== Men ====
The Montenegro national football team represents Montenegro in association football and is controlled by the Fudbalski Savez Crne Gore (FSCG), the governing body for football in Montenegro. In October 2006, Montenegro was granted provisional membership of UEFA, with a full membership scheduled at a in January 2007. The team played its official friendly match against Hungary on 24 March 2007 in Podgorica, and won 2:1. Until now, best success of Montenegro was participation in the play-off round for UEFA Euro 2012. Montenegro played against the Czech Republic, but failing to qualify.

==== Women ====
Montenegro women's national football team was founded in 2012. It is organised and headed by Football Association of Montenegro. Montenegro played first official match on 13 March 2012 in Bar, against Bosnia and Herzegovina (2:3). Best competitive result, Montenegro made at 2013–14, when they qualified for the final round of 2015 FIFA Women's World Cup qualification (UEFA).

=== Montenegro national basketball team ===
==== Men ====
In 2006, the Basketball Federation of Montenegro along with national team joined the International Basketball Federation (FIBA) on its own following the Independence of Montenegro. The Montenegro national team entered international competition in 2008, playing its debut official match on 6 September, against the Netherlands in Almere (70–63). Montenegro appeared in the EuroBasket twice (2011 and 2013).

==== Women ====
The women's national basketball team is the representative for Montenegro in international women's basketball competitions and it is organized and run by the Basketball Federation of Montenegro. The Montenegro women's national team entered international competition in 2008, playing its first official match on 27 August, against Republic of Ireland in Bijelo Polje (68–56). Montenegrin women's team participated on EuroBasket Women three times - 2011, 2013 and 2015, playing two times in quarterfinals.

=== Montenegro national handball team ===
==== Men ====
The national handball team was formed in 2006, recently after independence. Montenegro is a full member of IHF and EHF since 2006. Montenegro played their first official match at 3 January 2007 in Vantaa and won against Finland (28:26). Since then, Montenegro successfully qualified for four big competitions – once for the World Cup (2013) and for the European Championship 2008, 2014 and 2016.

==== Women ====
Montenegro women's national handball team was formed in 2006, and started playing in IHF and EHF competitions during the same year. Montenegro played their first official match in November 2006 in Cheb and won against Bulgaria (32:28). Women's handball team is among most successful Montenegro national teams. They won Montenegro's first ever Olympic medal in 2012 by reaching the final. Same year, Montenegro was a champion of Europe.

=== Montenegro national volleyball team ===
==== Men ====
The national volleyball team was formed in 2006, recently after independence. Montenegro is a full member of FIVB and CEV since 2006. Montenegro played their first official match at 1 September 2007 in Podgorica and won against Latvia (3–1). Until now, at major tournaments, Montenegro played in FIVB World League and European League. The team never qualified for World Championship or European Championship. During the history, Montenegro won one gold medal at major men's volleyball tournaments.

==== Women ====
Soon after the Montenegrin independence referendum, Volleyball Federation of Montenegro founded national teams. Women's team started to play in 2008, with the first match against Albania (3:0, friendly game). Same year, Montenegro played its first games in official competitions - against Georgia in 2009 European Volleyball Championship qualifiers.

== See also ==
- List of Montenegrin sportspeople
