= Montenegrin volleyball clubs in European competitions =

Montenegrin volleyball clubs are participating in the CEV competitions since the season 1995–96.
First team which ever competed at the European cups was OK Budućnost Podgorica. Except them, in CEV competitions played also OK Budvanska Rivijera Budva, OK Sutjeska Nikšić, OK Jedinstvo Bijelo Polje and OK Studentski Centar Podgorica.
Among other competitions, OK Budućnost and OK Budvanska Rivijera played a numerous seasons in CEV Champions League, with few participations in the final phases of competition.

== List of matches ==
Below is a list of games of all Montenegrin clubs in CEV competitions.

Season	Competition	Round	Montenegrin team	Opponent	Home	Away
1995-96	CEV Cup	Round 1	OK Budućnost Podgorica	(Albania) Erzeni Durrës	3-0	3-0
1995-96	CEV Cup	Round 2	OK Budućnost Podgorica	(Hungary) Vasas Budapest	3-0	
1995-96	CEV Cup	Round 2	OK Budućnost Podgorica	(Cyprus) Anorthosis Famagusta	3-1	
1995-96	CEV Cup	Round 2	OK Budućnost Podgorica	(Romania) Rifil Săvineşti	3-1	
1995-96	CEV Cup	Round of 16	OK Budućnost Podgorica	(Czech Republic) Aero Odolena Voda	2-3	2-3
1996-97	CEV Cup	Round 2	OK Budućnost Podgorica	(Greece) Ktisifon Peania	0-3	
1996-97	CEV Cup	Round 2	OK Budućnost Podgorica	(Switzerland) Amriswil	3-1	
1996-97	CEV Cup	Round 2	OK Budućnost Podgorica	(Bosnia and Herzegovina) Mladost Brčko	3-0	
1999-00	CEV Cup	Round 2	OK Budvanska Rivijera Budva	(Portugal) Esmoriz	3-1	
1999-00	CEV Cup	Round 2	OK Budvanska Rivijera Budva	(Bosnia and Herzegovina) Sinpos Sarajevo	3-0	
1999-00	CEV Cup	Round of 16	OK Budvanska Rivijera Budva	(Belgium) Knack Roeselare	3-1	1-3
2000-01	CEV Cup	Round 1	OK Budvanska Rivijera Budva	(Norway) Brøstadbotn	3-0	3-0
2000-01	CEV Cup	Round 2	OK Budvanska Rivijera Budva	(Finland) Rovaniemen	3-2	
2000-01	CEV Cup	Round 2	OK Budvanska Rivijera Budva	(Germany) Eintracht Mendig	3-1	
2000-01	CEV Cup	Round 2	OK Budvanska Rivijera Budva	(Bosnia and Herzegovina) Kakanj	3-1	
2000-01	CEV Cup	Round of 16	OK Budvanska Rivijera Budva	(Italy) Pallavolo Gabeca	1-3	1-3
2001-02	CEV Top Teams Cup	Group A	OK Budvanska Rivijera Budva	(Portugal) Castêlo da Maia	3-2	0-3
2001-02	CEV Top Teams Cup	Group A	OK Budvanska Rivijera Budva	(Croatia) Mladost Zagreb	3-2	0-3
2001-02	CEV Top Teams Cup	Group A	OK Budvanska Rivijera Budva	(Belgium) Knack Roeselare	1-3	0-3
2001-02	CEV Top Teams Cup	Group F	OK Budućnost Podgorica	(Ukraine) Lokomotiv Kharkiv	1-3	2-3
2001-02	CEV Top Teams Cup	Group F	OK Budućnost Podgorica	(North Macedonia) Rabotnički Skopje	3-0	1-3
2001-02	CEV Top Teams Cup	Group F	OK Budućnost Podgorica	(Romania) Petrom Ploieşti	3-1	2-3
2002-03	CEV Champions League	Group C	OK Budućnost Podgorica	(Germany) Friedrichshafen	0-3	2-3
2002-03	CEV Champions League	Group C	OK Budućnost Podgorica	(Austria) HotVolleys Vienna	3-1	1-3
2002-03	CEV Champions League	Group C	OK Budućnost Podgorica	(France) Paris Volley	0-3	0-3
2003-04	CEV Top Teams Cup	Group 4	OK Budućnost Podgorica	(Italy) Ferrara	3-2	
2003-04	CEV Top Teams Cup	Group 4	OK Budućnost Podgorica	(Belgium) Lennik	1-3	
2003-04	CEV Top Teams Cup	Group 4	OK Budućnost Podgorica	(Romania) Petrom Ploieşti	3-0	
2004-05	CEV Top Teams Cup	Group 7	OK Budvanska Rivijera Budva	(Bosnia and Herzegovina) Mladost Brčko	3-1	
2004-05	CEV Top Teams Cup	Group 7	OK Budvanska Rivijera Budva	(Germany) Powervolleys Düren	3-1	
2004-05	CEV Top Teams Cup	Group 7	OK Budvanska Rivijera Budva	(Austria) Hartberg	0-3	
2005-06	CEV Top Teams Cup	Group 12	OK Budvanska Rivijera Budva	(Estonia) Pärnu	3-1	
2005-06	CEV Top Teams Cup	Group 12	OK Budvanska Rivijera Budva	(Belarus) Gomel	3-1	
2005-06	CEV Top Teams Cup	Group 12	OK Budvanska Rivijera Budva	(Turkey) Polis Akademisi Ankara	3-0	
2005-06	CEV Top Teams Cup	Round of 16	OK Budvanska Rivijera Budva	(Spain) Numancia	1-3	0-3
2006-07	CEV Champions League	Group A	OK Budućnost Podgorica	(Spain) Pòrtol Mallorca	3-2	1-3
2006-07	CEV Champions League	Group A	OK Budućnost Podgorica	(Germany) Powervolleys Düren	3-1	1-3
2006-07	CEV Champions League	Group A	OK Budućnost Podgorica	(France) Tours	2-3	1-3
2006-07	CEV Champions League	Group A	OK Budućnost Podgorica	(Austria) Tirol Innsbruck	3-0	3-2
2006-07	CEV Champions League	Group A	OK Budućnost Podgorica	(Russia) Lokomotiv Belgorod	3-2	0-3
2006-07	CEV Top Teams Cup	Group 7	OK Budvanska Rivijera Budva	(Azerbaijan) Azerneft Baku	3-0	
2006-07	CEV Top Teams Cup	Group 7	OK Budvanska Rivijera Budva	(Belarus) Shakhtar Soligorsk	3-0	
2006-07	CEV Top Teams Cup	Group 7	OK Budvanska Rivijera Budva	(Greece) PAOK	2-3	
2007-08	CEV Champions League	Group B	OK Budućnost Podgorica	(Poland) Skra Bełchatów	2-3	1-3
2007-08	CEV Champions League	Group B	OK Budućnost Podgorica	(Serbia) Vojvodina Novi Sad	3-0	3-0
2007-08	CEV Champions League	Group B	OK Budućnost Podgorica	(Greece) Panathinaikos	1-3	0-3
2007-08	CEV Cup	Challenge Round	OK Budućnost Podgorica	(Montenegro) OK Budvanska Rivijera Budva	3-1	0-3
2007-08	CEV Cup	Round 1	OK Budvanska Rivijera Budva	(Slovenia) Maribor	3-0	3-1
2007-08	CEV Cup	Round of 16	OK Budvanska Rivijera Budva	(Hungary) Kometa Kaposvar	3-0	3-2
2007-08	CEV Cup	Quarterfinals	OK Budvanska Rivijera Budva	(Serbia) Radnički Kragujevac	3-2	3-0
2007-08	CEV Cup	Challenge Round	OK Budvanska Rivijera Budva	(Montenegro) OK Budućnost Podgorica	3-0	1-3
2007-08	CEV Cup	Semifinals	OK Budvanska Rivijera Budva	(Belgium) Noliko Maaseik	0-3	
2007-08	CEV Cup	3rd Place Match	OK Budvanska Rivijera Budva	(Russia) Fakel	3-1	
2007-08	CEV Challenge Cup	Round 1	OK Jedinstvo Bijelo Polje	(Cyprus) Pafiakos	0-3	0-3
2007-08	CEV Challenge Cup	Round 1	OK Studentski Centar Podgorica	(Cyprus) Anorthosis Famagusta	0-3	0-3
2008-09	CEV Cup	Round 1	OK Budvanska Rivijera Budva	(Belgium) Lennik	3-0	3-1
2008-09	CEV Cup	Round of 16	OK Budvanska Rivijera Budva	(Czech Republic) Dukla Liberec	3-0	1-3
2008-09	CEV Cup	Quarterfinals	OK Budvanska Rivijera Budva	(Italy) Cuneo	2-3	0-3
2008-09	CEV Cup	Round 1	OK Budućnost Podgorica	(Belgium) Handelsgids Averbode	3-0	3-0
2008-09	CEV Cup	Round of 16	OK Budućnost Podgorica	(Russia) Lokomotiv Novosibirsk	3-0	0-3
2008-09	CEV Challenge Cup	Round 1	OK Sutjeska Nikšić	(Switzerland) Chênois Genève	0-3	0-3
2008-09	CEV Challenge Cup	Round 1	OK Studentski Centar Podgorica	(Portugal) Fonte do Bastardo	1-3	0-3
2009-10	CEV Champions League	Group C	OK Budvanska Rivijera Budva	(Belgium) Noliko Maaseik	1-3	1-3
2009-10	CEV Champions League	Group C	OK Budvanska Rivijera Budva	(Italy) Volley Lube	1-3	0-3
2009-10	CEV Champions League	Group C	OK Budvanska Rivijera Budva	(Austria) Tirol Innsbruck	3-2	1-3
2009-10	CEV Cup	Round 1	OK Budućnost Podgorica	(Romania) CS Dinamo București	3-0	3-1
2009-10	CEV Cup	Round of 16	OK Budućnost Podgorica	(France) Tourcoing Lille Métropole	1-3	0-3
2009-10	CEV Challenge Cup	Round 1	OK Sutjeska Nikšić	(Cyprus) Omonia Nicosia	0-3	0-3
2010-11	CEV Champions League	Group C	OK Budvanska Rivijera Budva	(Greece) Olympiacos	3-0	3-2
2010-11	CEV Champions League	Group C	OK Budvanska Rivijera Budva	(Slovenia) ACH Volley Bled	3-2	0-3
2010-11	CEV Champions League	Group C	OK Budvanska Rivijera Budva	(Poland) HJastrzębski Węgiel	3-2	0-3
2010-11	CEV Champions League	Playoffs	OK Budvanska Rivijera Budva	(Belgium) Noliko Maaseik	1-3	1-3
2011-12	CEV Champions League	Group F	OK Budvanska Rivijera Budva	(Poland) Skra Bełchatów	0-3	0-3
2011-12	CEV Champions League	Group F	OK Budvanska Rivijera Budva	(Slovenia) ACH Volley Bled	0-3	2-3
2011-12	CEV Champions League	Group F	OK Budvanska Rivijera Budva	(France) Tours	0-3	1-3
2011-12	CEV Cup	Round 1	OK Budućnost Podgorica	(Bosnia and Herzegovina) Kakanj	3-2	3-1
2011-12	CEV Cup	Round of 16	OK Budućnost Podgorica	(Greece) Lamia	0-3	3-2
2012-13	CEV Champions League	Group B	OK Budvanska Rivijera Budva	(Russia) Lokomotiv Novosibirsk	0-3	0-3
2012-13	CEV Champions League	Group B	OK Budvanska Rivijera Budva	(Czech Republic) Jihostroj České Budějovice	3-2	0-3
2012-13	CEV Champions League	Group B	OK Budvanska Rivijera Budva	(Germany) Berlin	2-3	1-3
2013-14	CEV Champions League	Group C	OK Budvanska Rivijera Budva	(Czech Republic) Jihostroj České Budějovice	3-0	3-1
2013-14	CEV Champions League	Group C	OK Budvanska Rivijera Budva	(Poland) Resovia Rzeszow	3-0	3-2
2013-14	CEV Champions League	Group C	OK Budvanska Rivijera Budva	(France) Paris Volley	2-3	0-3
2013-14	CEV Champions League	Playoffs	OK Budvanska Rivijera Budva	(Russia) Lokomotiv Belgorod	2-3	0-3
2014-15	CEV Champions League	Group C	OK Budvanska Rivijera Budva	(Poland) Resovia Rzeszow	0-3	0-3
2014-15	CEV Champions League	Group C	OK Budvanska Rivijera Budva	(Germany) Berlin	3-2	0-3
2014-15	CEV Champions League	Group C	OK Budvanska Rivijera Budva	(Slovenia) ACH Volley Bled	3-1	1-3
2015-16	CEV Champions League	Group D	OK Budvanska Rivijera Budva	(Turkey) Halkbank Ankara	0-3	0-3
2015-16	CEV Champions League	Group D	OK Budvanska Rivijera Budva	(Russia) Zenit Kazan	0-3	0-3
2015-16	CEV Champions League	Group D	OK Budvanska Rivijera Budva	(Austria) Tirol Innsbruck	2-3	0-3
2016-17	CEV Cup	Round 1	OK Budvanska Rivijera Budva	(Finland) Raision Loimu	3-2	3-2
2016-17	CEV Cup	Round 2	OK Budvanska Rivijera Budva	(France) Ajaccio	0-3	0-3
2016-17	CEV Cup	Round 1	OK Jedinstvo Bijelo Polje	(Bulgaria) Levski Sofia	0-3	0-3
2017-18	CEV Cup	Round 1	OK Jedinstvo Bijelo Polje	(Croatia) Rijeka	3-1	3-0
2017-18	CEV Cup	Round 2	OK Jedinstvo Bijelo Polje	(Austria) Posojilnica	0-3	0-3
2018-19	CEV Cup	Round 1	OK Jedinstvo Bijelo Polje	(Serbia) Novi Pazar	3-1	3-2
2018-19	CEV Cup	Round 2	OK Jedinstvo Bijelo Polje	(Russia) Kuzbass Kemerovo	0-3	0-3
2018-19	CEV Challenge Cup	Round 1	OK Budućnost Podgorica	(Romania) Zalău	0-3	0-3
2019-20	CEV Cup	Round 1	OK Budva	(Bosnia and Herzegovina) Kakanj	3-0	3-1
2019-20	CEV Cup	Round of 16	OK Budva	(Russia) Zenit Saint Petersburg	0-3	0-3
2019-20	CEV Challenge Cup	Round 3	OK Budućnost Podgorica	(Slovakia) Nitra	3-2	0-3

== Performances by clubs ==
During the overall history, five different Montenegrin clubs played in CEV competitions.

Team	Seasons	G	W	L
OK Budvanska Rivijera Budva	16	94	42	52
OK Budućnost Podgorica	12	59	29	30
OK Jedinstvo Bijelo Polje	4	12	4	8
OK Sutjeska Nikšić	2	4	0	4
OK Studentski Centar Podgorica	2	4	0	4
OK Budva	1	4	2	2

As of the end of CEV competitions 2019–20 season.

== Scores by competitions ==
Until now, Montenegrin volleyball clubs played in CEV Champions League, CEV Cup and CEV Challenge Cup.
Below is the list of performances of Montenegrin clubs in every single European volleyball competition.

Competition	G	W	L
CEV Champions League	68	20	48
CEV Cup	95	56	39
CEV Challenge Cup	14	1	13

As of the end of CEV competitions 2019–20 season.

== Opponents by countries ==
Below is the list of performances of Montenegrin clubs against opponents in CEV competitions by their countries (volleyball federations).

Opponents' country	G	W	L
Albania	2	2	0
Austria	11	4	7
Azerbaijan	1	1	0
Belarus	2	2	0
Belgium	14	5	9
Bosnia and Herzegovina	8	8	0
Bulgaria	2	0	2
Croatia	4	3	1
Cyprus	7	1	6
Czech Republic	8	4	4
Estonia	1	1	0
Finland	3	3	0
France	12	0	12
Germany	10	4	6
Greece	8	3	5
Hungary	3	3	0
Italy	7	1	6
Macedonia	2	1	1
Norway	2	2	0
Poland	10	3	7
Portugal	5	2	3
Romania	8	5	3
Russia	15	3	12
Serbia	6	6	0
Slovakia	2	1	1
Slovenia	8	4	4
Spain	4	1	3
Switzerland	3	1	2
Turkey	3	1	2
Ukraine	2	0	2

As of the end of CEV competitions 2017–18 season.

== See also ==
- Montenegrin Volleyball League
- Montenegrin volleyball Cup
- Volleyball Federation of Montenegro (OSCG)
