= Montenegrin women's volleyball clubs in European competitions =

Montenegrin women's volleyball clubs have been participating in the CEV competitions since the 1998-99 season.

The first team to ever compete in the European Cups was ŽOK Luka Bar. Except for them, in CEV competitions, ŽOK Galeb and ŽOK Herceg Novi also participated.

Montenegrin women's volleyball teams participated in the Women's CEV Cup and CEV Women's Challenge Cup, and from the 2016-17 season in the qualifiers for the CEV Women's Champions League.

== List of matches ==
Below is a list of games of all Montenegrin clubs in CEV competitions.

Season	Competition	Round	Montenegrin team	Opponent	Home	Away
1998-99	Women's CEV Cup	Round 2	ŽOK Luka Bar	(Germany) USC Münster	0-3	
1998-99	Women's CEV Cup	Round 2	ŽOK Luka Bar	(Switzerland) Kanti Schaffhausen	0-3	
1998-99	Women's CEV Cup	Round 2	ŽOK Luka Bar	(Luxembourg) Volley 80 Pétange	3-0	
2007-08	CEV Women's Challenge Cup	Round 1	ŽOK Luka Bar	(Poland) Muszynianka Muszyna	0-3	0-3
2008-09	CEV Women's Challenge Cup	Round 1	ŽOK Luka Bar	(Bosnia and Herzegovina) Jedinstvo Brčko	0-3	0-3
2009-10	CEV Women's Challenge Cup	Round 1	ŽOK Luka Bar	(Germany) Dresdner	0-3	0-3
2010-11	CEV Women's Challenge Cup	Round 1	ŽOK Galeb Bar	(Slovakia) Senica	2-3	0-3
2012-13	CEV Women's Challenge Cup	Round 1	ŽOK Luka Bar	(Cyprus) Apollon Limassol	1-3	1-3
2016-17	CEV Women's Champions League	Round 1	ŽOK Luka Bar	(Estonia) Kohila VC	2-3	1-3
2016-17	Women's CEV Cup	Round 1	ŽOK Luka Bar	(Austria) VC Tirol Innsbruck	3-1	1-3
2016-17	Women's CEV Cup	Round 2	ŽOK Luka Bar	(Poland) Budowlani Łódź	0-3	0-3
2019-20	CEV Women's Champions League	Round 1	ŽOK Luka Bar	(Hungary) Vasas	0-3	0-3
2019-20	Women's CEV Cup	Round 1	ŽOK Luka Bar	(Switzerland) Düdingen	0-3	1-3
2022-23	CEV Women's Challenge Cup	Round 1	ŽOK Galeb	(Netherlands) Sliedrecht Sport	0-3	0-3
2022-23	CEV Women's Challenge Cup	Round 1	ŽOK Herceg Novi	(Norway) Tromsø	3-0	3-0
2022-23	CEV Women's Challenge Cup	Round 2	ŽOK Herceg Novi	(Belgium) Asterix Kieldrecht	1-3	0-3
2023-24	CEV Women's Champions League	Round 1	ŽOK Herceg Novi	(Croatia) Mladost Zagreb	0-3	
2023-24	CEV Women's Champions League	Round 1	ŽOK Herceg Novi	(Bosnia and Herzegovina) Gacko	3-1	
2023-24	CEV Women's Champions League	Round 1	ŽOK Herceg Novi	(Belgium) Asterix Kieldrecht	2-3	
2023-24	Women's CEV Cup	Round 1	ŽOK Herceg Novi	(France) Levallois Paris	0-3	0-3

== Performances by clubs ==
During the overall history, three different Montenegrin clubs played in CEV competitions.

Team	Seasons	G	W	L
ŽOK Luka Bar	7	21	2	19
ŽOK Herceg Novi	2	9	3	6
ŽOK Galeb Bar	2	4	0	4

As of the end of the CEV competitions 2023–24 season.

== Opponents by countries ==
Below is a list of performances by Montenegrin clubs against opponents in CEV competitions, categorised by their respective countries (volleyball federations).

Opponents' country	G	W	L
Austria	2	1	1
Belgium	3	0	3
Bosnia and Herzegovina	3	1	2
Croatia	1	0	1
Cyprus	2	0	2
Estonia	2	0	2
France	2	0	2
Germany	3	0	3
Hungary	2	0	2
Luxembourg	1	1	0
Netherlands	2	0	2
Norway	2	2	0
Poland	4	0	4
Slovakia	2	0	2
Switzerland	3	0	3

As of the end of CEV competitions 2023–24 season.

== See also ==
- Montenegrin women's volley league
- Montenegrin women's volleyball Cup
- Montenegro women's national volleyball team
- Volleyball Federation of Montenegro (OSCG)
