= Vojin Ćaćić =

Montenegrin volleyball player (born 1990)

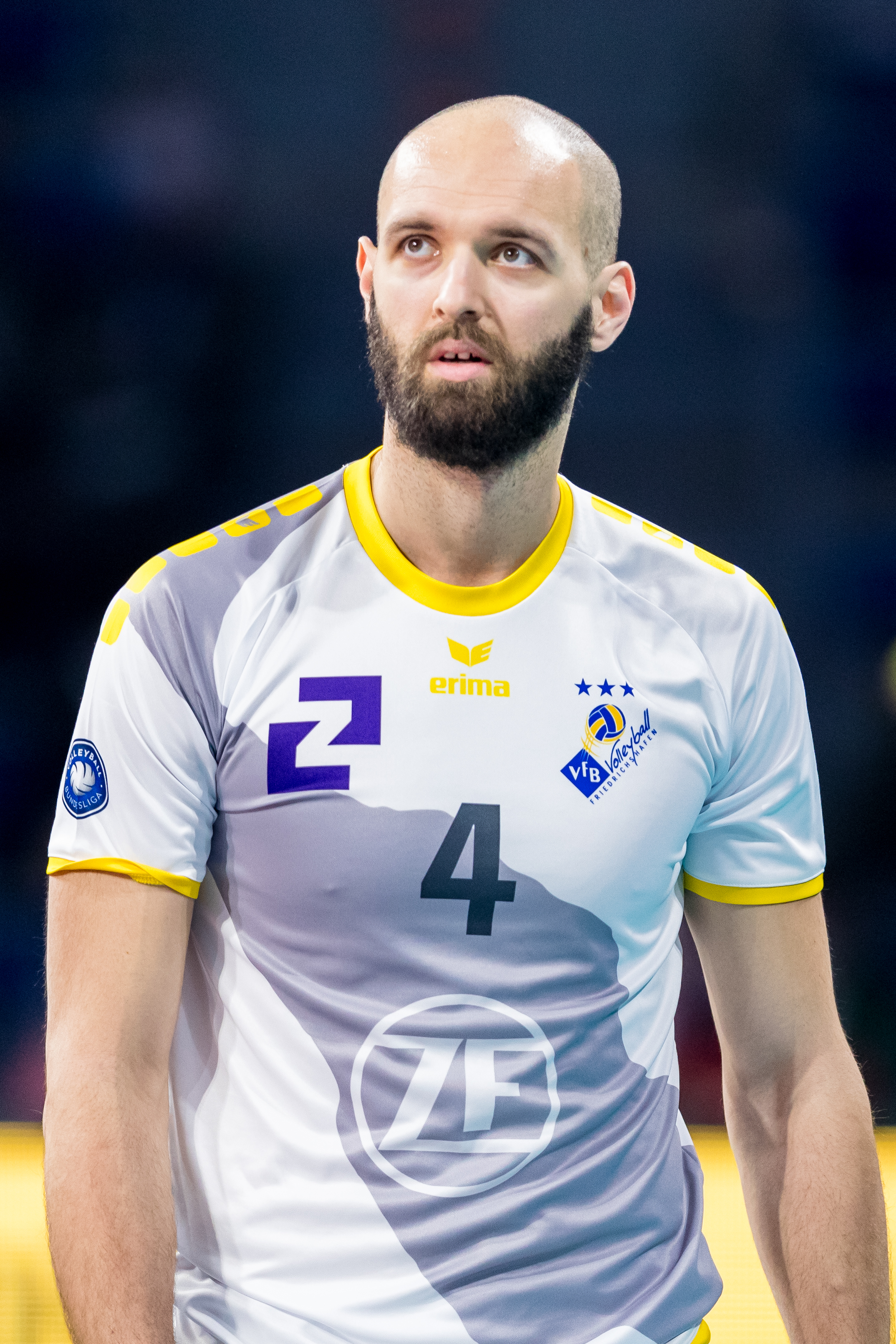

Personal information
- Nationality: (Montenegro) Montenegrin
- Born: 31 March 1990 (age 36) Bar, Montenegro
- Height: 202 cm (6 ft 8 in)
- Weight: 90 kg (198 lb)
- Spike: 345 cm (136 in)
- Block: 330 cm (130 in)

Volleyball information
- Position: Outside hitter

Career
- Years: Team
- 2006–2015 2015 2015–2016 2016–2017 2017–2018 2018–2019 2019–2020 2020–2021: (Montenegro) Budvanska Rivijera Budva (Turkey) Sahinbey Belediye (Iran) Samen Khorasan VC (Iran) Sarmayeh Bank Tehran (Turkey) Ziraat Bankası Ankara (Turkey) İnegöl Belediyesi (Poland) Aluron Virtu CMC Zawiercie (Greece) Panathinaikos

National team
- Years: Team
- 2014–: Montenegro

Vojin Ćaćić (born 31 March 1990) is a Montenegrin male volleyball player. He is a captain of the Montenegro men's national volleyball team.

== Sporting achievements ==
=== CEV Cup ===
- 2008 2007–08 Men's CEV Cup, with Budvanska Rivijera Budva
- 2018 2017–18 Men's CEV Cup, with Ziraat Bankası Ankara

=== AVC Club Volleyball game Championship ===
- 2016 2016 Asian Men's Club Volleyball Championship, with Sarmayeh Bank Tehran

=== Club titles ===
- 2008 Montenegrin Championship, with Budvanska Rivijera Budva
- 2009 Montenegrin Championship, with Budvanska Rivijera Budva
- 2010 Montenegrin Championship, with Budvanska Rivijera Budva
- 2010 Montenegrin Cup, with Budvanska Rivijera Budva
- 2011 Montenegrin Championship, with Budvanska Rivijera Budva
- 2011 Montenegrin Cup, with Budvanska Rivijera Budva
- 2012 Montenegrin Championship, with Budvanska Rivijera Budva
- 2012 Montenegrin Cup, with Budvanska Rivijera Budva
- 2013 Montenegrin Championship, with Budvanska Rivijera Budva
- 2017 Iranian Championship, with Sarmayeh Bank Tehran
- 2020 Greek League Cup, with Panathinaikos
- 2020 Greek Championship, with Panathinaikos

=== National team ===
- 2014 Men's European Volleyball League
