= Konstantin Čupković =

Serbian volleyball player (born 1987)

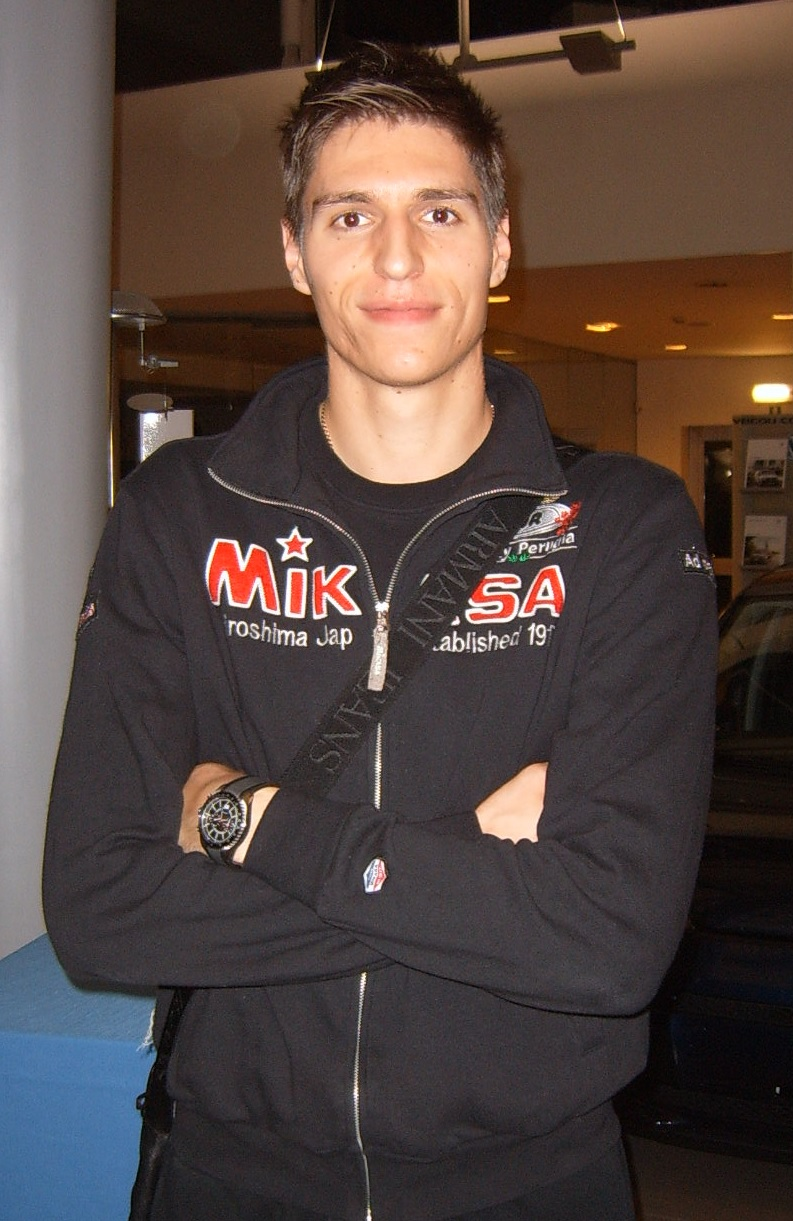

Personal information
- Nickname: Cupko
- Nationality: Serbian
- Born: 2 January 1987 (age 39); Virovitica, Croatia, Yugoslavia
- Height: 2.02 m (6 ft 8 in)
- Weight: 125 kg (276 lb)
- Spike: 365 cm (144 in)
- Block: 337 cm (133 in)

Volleyball information
- Position: Outside hitter
- Current club: BBTS Bielsko-Biała
- Number: 19

Career
Years	Teams
2000–2006; 2006–2009; 2009–2010; 2010–2011; 2011; 2011; 2011–2013; 2013–2014; 2014–2015; 2015–2016; 2016–2017; 2017; 2017–2018; 2018–2019; 2019–2020; 2020–2021; 2021; 2021–2022; 2022–	Mladi Radnik Požarevac; Vojvodina Novi Sad; Radnički Kragujevac; Budvanska Rivijera; M. Roma Volley; Al Rayyan; Skra Bełchatów; Sir Safety Perugia; Transfer Bydgoszcz; Tours VB; Olympiacos Piraeus; Mladi Radnik Požarevac; Tours VB; Fenerbahçe İstanbul; Tours VB; Mladost Zagreb; Jiangsu Volleyball; Al Arabi; BBTS Bielsko-Biała

National team
2011–	Serbia

Konstantin Čupković (Serbian Cyrillic: Константин Чупковић; born 2 January 1987) is a Serbian professional volleyball player, a former member of the Serbia national team. At the professional club level, he plays for BBTS Bielsko-Biała.

== Career ==
=== Clubs ===
His first professional club was Serbian Mladi Radnik Pozarevac. In 2011 he moved to Polish Champion, one of the most successful Polish team of PlusLiga, PGE Skra Bełchatów. With PGE Skra Belchatów he won silver medal of Polish Championship in 2011/2012. He has silver medal of Club World Championships from 2012. He won with the club from Bełchatów the Polish Cup in 2012. In 2012 PGE Skra Belchatów, with Konstantin, gained the silver medal of CEV Champions League after the match against Zenit Kazan on Final Four in Łódź, Poland. The match ended controversially, because the judge didn't see an error by a Russian player and ended the match despite the fact that the audience and the players saw the error on screen. He was a player of Sir Safety Perugia in season 2013/2014. On 4 May 2014, he won silver medal of Italian Championship 2013/2014. On 8 May 2014 was announced officially that Čupković moved to the Polish club Transfer Bydgoszcz. In 2015 went to Tours VB. On 25 May 2016, his transfer to Olympiacos was announced officially.

== Honours ==
=== Clubs ===
- Men's Club World Championship
  - 2013 – with PGE Skra Bełchatów
- CEV Champions League
  - 2011/2012 – with PGE Skra Bełchatów (runner-up)
- AVC Asian Champions League
  - 2021 – with Al Arabi (runner-up)
- National championships
  - 2006/2007 Serbian Cup with Vojvodina
  - 2006/2007 Serbian Championship with Vojvodina
  - 2009/2010 Serbian Championship with Radnički Kragujevac
  - 2010/2011 Montenegrin Cup with Budvanska Rivijera
  - 2010/2011 Montenegrin Championship with Budvanska Rivijera
  - 2011/2012 Polish Cup, with PGE Skra Bełchatów
  - 2012/2013 Polish SuperCup, with PGE Skra Bełchatów
  - 2015/2016 French SuperCup, with Tours VB
  - 2016/2017 Greek League Cup, with Olympiacos Piraeus
  - 2018/2019 Turkish Cup, with Fenerbahçe
  - 2018/2019 Turkish Championship, with Fenerbahçe
  - 2020/2021 Croatian Championship, with Mladost
  - 2021/2022 Croatian Cup, with Mladost
  - 2021/2022 Croatian Championship, with HAOK Mladost

=== Individual awards ===
- 2010: Serbian Championship – Best scorer
- 2010: Serbian Championship – Best outside hitter
- 2015: French Super Cup – Most valuable player
- 2017: Greek League Cup – Most valuable player
- 2017: Greek Cup – Most valuable player
- 2019: French Championship Final – Most valuable player
- 2021: AVC Asian Champions League – Best outside hitter
