= ŽOK Lovćen Cetinje =

Montenegrin women's volleyball club, based in Cetinje

- Full name: Ženski odbojkaški klub Lovćen
- Founded: 1980; 46 years ago
- Ground: SRC Lovćen, Cetinje, Montenegro (Capacity: 2,020)
- League: Second League

Uniforms
Home	Away

ŽOK Lovćen (Ženski odbojkaški klub Lovćen) is a Montenegrin women's volleyball club founded in 1980. Based in Cetinje, ŽOK Lovćen often participate in Montenegrin women's volley league and Second League.

== History ==
Volleyball club Lovćen is founded at 1980, but women section played only friendlies during the 80's. At the period from 1990 to 2010, volleyball clubs on Cetinje doesn't existed.
Club was reactivated at 2011, and played their first official season in Montenegrin Second League at 2012-13. Biggest success of ŽOK Lovćen was participation in Montenegrin women's volley league 2014-15.

=== Record by seasons ===
Below is a list of ŽOK Lovćen seasons in Montenegrin women's volleyball competitions.

Season	Competition	Pos	G	W	L	SD	Pts
2012-13	Montenegrin Second League	4	24	2	22	8:65	6
2013-14	Montenegrin Second League	2	26	18	8	51:29	50
2014-15	Montenegrin First League	10	18	2	16	13:50	6

== See also ==
- Montenegrin women's volley league
- Montenegrin women's volleyball Cup
- Volleyball Federation of Montenegro (OSCG)
- SD Lovćen Cetinje
- Cetinje
