= Igor Kolaković =

Montenegrin volleyball player and coach

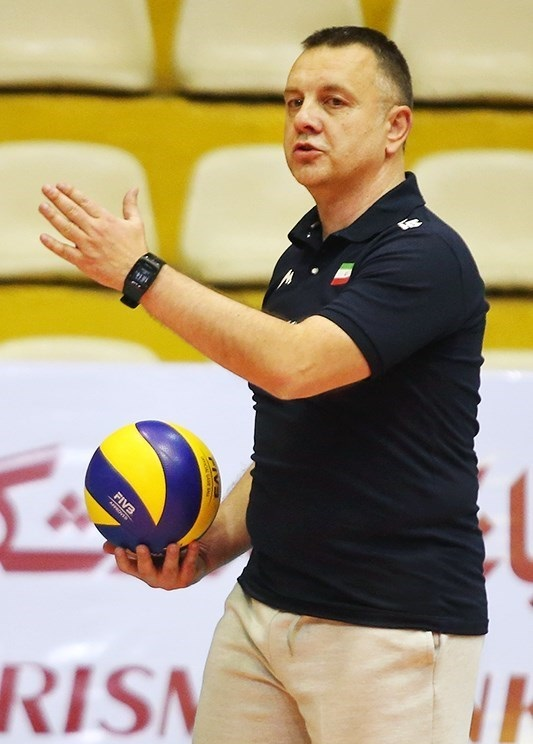

Personal information
- Born: 4 June 1965 (age 61); Titograd, SR Montenegro, SFR Yugoslavia

Coaching information
- Current team: ACH Volley
Previous teams coached
Years	Teams
1997–2009; 2003–2006; 2006–2014; 2010–2012; 2013–2016; 2017–2020; 2020–2022; 2022–2024; 2024–2025; 2025–	Budućnost Podgorica; Serbia and Montenegro (AC); Serbia; ACH Volley; AS Cannes; Iran; Warta Zawiercie; Serbia; Halkbank Ankara; ACH Volley

Volleyball information
- Position: Setter

Career
Years	Teams
1979–1987; 1987–1991; 1991–1993; 1993–1994; 1994–1997	Budućnost Podgorica; Partizan Beograd; Budućnost Podgorica; Partizan Beograd; Budućnost Podgorica
Honours
Men's volleyball
Head coach Serbia
FIVB World Championship
Bronze medal – third place	2010 Italy
FIVB World League
Silver medal – second place	2008 Rio de Janeiro
Silver medal – second place	2009 Belgrade
Bronze medal – third place	2010 Córdoba
CEV European Championship
Gold medal – first place	2011 Austria/Czech Republic
Bronze medal – third place	2007 Russia
Bronze medal – third place	2013 Denmark/Poland
Head coach Iran
FIVB World Grand Champions Cup
Bronze medal – third place	2017 Japan
AVC Asian Championship
Gold medal – first place	2019 Tehran

Igor Kolaković (Serbian Cyrillic: Игор Колаковић; born 4 June 1965) is a Montenegrin professional volleyball coach and former player. Since the 2025–26 season, he has served as head coach for ACH Volley.

== Personal life ==
Igor's wife, Sandra, is a former handball national team player and former head coach of the Serbia women's national handball team. Igor received a bachelor's degree in business administration in 1989 at the University of Montenegro. Aleksa Kolaković, son of Igor, is a handball player.

== Career ==
=== As a player ===
Kolakovic played as a setter for Budućnost Podgorica and Partizan Beograd from 1979 to 1997, after which he became the head coach of the Podgorica team.

=== As a coach ===
Igor Kolaković replaced Ljubomir Travica as head coach of the Serbia men's national volleyball team ahead of the 2006 World Championship, after assisting him for three years. He led Serbia to a gold medal at the 2011 European Championship, and bronze in 2007 and 2013. In 2010, he achieved a great success at the 2010 World Championship, winning a bronze medal. He helped his team win two silver medals at the 2008 and 2009 World League, and a bronze one in 2010. In 2014, he resigned his post as the head coach of Serbia after eight years. At the professional club level, he won, among others, two titles of the Montenegrin Champion in 2007 and 2008 with Budućnost Podgorica, and two titles of the Slovenian Champion in 2011 and 2012 with ACH Volley. In 2017, he was appointed as a new head coach of the Iran national team. He led Iran to a bronze medal at the 2017 World Grand Champions Cup, defeating, among others, teams of the USA, France and Italy. In 2019, Iran, led by him, won their 3rd Asian Champions title. In 2020, he was dismissed as the head coach of Iran.

== Honours ==
=== As a player ===
- CEV Challenge Cup
  - 1989–90 – with Partizan Beograd
- Domestic
  - 1988–89 Yugoslavian Cup, with Partizan Beograd
  - 1989–90 Yugoslavian Cup, with Partizan Beograd
  - 1989–90 Yugoslavian Championship, with Partizan Beograd
  - 1990–91 Yugoslavian Championship, with Partizan Beograd

=== As a coach ===
- Domestic
  - 2000–01 Serbia and Montenegro Cup, with Budućnost Podgorica
  - 2001–02 Serbia and Montenegro Championship, with Budućnost Podgorica
  - 2004–05 Serbia and Montenegro Cup, with Budućnost Podgorica
  - 2004–05 Serbia and Montenegro Championship, with Budućnost Podgorica
  - 2005–06 Serbia and Montenegro Cup, with Budućnost Podgorica
  - 2005–06 Serbia and Montenegro Championship, with Budućnost Podgorica
  - 2006–07 Montenegrin Cup, with Budućnost Podgorica
  - 2006–07 Montenegrin Championship, with Budućnost Podgorica
  - 2007–08 Montenegrin Cup, with Budućnost Podgorica
  - 2007–08 Montenegrin Championship, with Budućnost Podgorica
  - 2010–11 Slovenian Cup, with ACH Volley
  - 2010–11 Slovenian Championship, with ACH Volley
  - 2011–12 Slovenian Cup, with ACH Volley
  - 2011–12 Slovenian Championship, with ACH Volley

Sporting positions
Preceded by (Serbia) Slobodan Kovač	Head coach of Serbia; 2022–2024	Succeeded by (Romania) Gheorghe Crețu
Preceded by (Argentina) Raúl Lozano	Head coach of Iran; 2017–2020	Succeeded by (Russia) Vladimir Alekno
Preceded by (Serbia) Ljubomir Travica	Head coach of Serbia; 2006–2014	Succeeded by (Serbia) Nikola Grbić
