= ŽOK Budućnost Podgorica =

Montenergin women's volleyball club

- Full name: Ženski odbojkaški klub Budućnost Podgorica
- Nickname: Plavo-bijele (The Blue-Whites)
- Founded: 1994
- Ground: Morača Sports Center, Podgorica, Montenegro (Capacity: 4,570)
- Manager: (Montenegro) Vladimir Racković
- League: Montenegrin women's volley league
- 2015/16: 7

Uniforms
Home	Away

ŽOK Budućnost is a Montenergin women's volleyball club founded in 1994. Based in Montenegro's capital Podgorica, Budućnost is a permanent member of Montenegrin women's volley league, with one champions title.
ŽOK Budućnost is a part of Budućnost Podgorica sports society.

== History ==
=== 1994-2011 ===
ŽOK Budućnost was established at 1994, as a first women's volleyball club in Podgorica. Budućnost started playing in Montenegrin Republic League (3rd rank in former FR Yugoslavia), where will compete until 2006. In their early days, Budućnost won the champions title in Republic League 1996–97, but failed to qualify for Second Yugoslav League. Another title in Montenegrin Republic League, Budućnost won at season 2000–01. During that period, Budućnost won two Republic Cups of Montenegro (2001–02, 2004–05).
After the Montenegrin independence referendum, Budućnost became a member of the First League (season 2006–07). First match in the top-tier competition, Budućnost played on October 15, 2006, against local rival ŽOK Podgorica (0:3).
First significant success Budućnost made on the season 2009–10, finishing 3rd after first phase of championship. For the first time in history, Budućnost participated in playoffs for title, but eliminated in semifinal-series against Galeb (1:2). Next season, Budućnost again lost the semifinal playoff-series against Galeb (0:2).

=== Champion title (2011-2012) ===
Season 2011-12 was the most successful in the club's history. Budućnost won the first champions-title, with placement in Montenegrin women's volleyball Cup. First phase of championship, Budućnost finished as a second-placed team with the score 14 wins - 2 losses. In playoff-semifinals, they won series against Podgorica-based club Morača (2:0). In the finals, after five games, Budućnost won the series against most successful Montenegrin side Luka Bar. Budućnost lost the first two games in the finals (0:3, 0:3), but won next two matches (3:1, 3:2). With the result 2–2 in series, final match for title was played in front of 2,000 spectators in Bar. Surprisingly, Budućnost won at the guest venue with result 3:0 (25:21, 25:22, 25:21) and became a champion of Montenegro.
Same season, Budućnost made the biggest achievement in the national Cup. After eliminating Budva (3:0) in final-four semifinals, they lose final game against Luka Bar (0:3).

=== 2012- ===
During the next two seasons, Budućnost were among top-clubs in the First League, but didn't succeed to gain another national trophy. Club played twice in the final of championship playoffs (2012–13, 2013-14) but both times lost 3–0 in series against Luka Bar. In season 2012–13, Budućnost made 10 consecutive wins in the First League.
Another performance in the Montenegrin Cup final match, Budućnost achieved at 2014. Previously, team from Podgorica eliminated Gimnazijalac (3:0) and Morača (3:0). On the final match, Budućnost again lost against Luka Bar (0:3).
Seasons 2014-15 and 2015-16 Budućnost finished far away from the top of the table.
Together with Luka Bar, Rudar and Gimnazijalac, ŽOK Budućnost is among clubs which played all the seasons in the Montenegrin first women's volley league.

== Honours and achievements ==
- National Championship:
  - winners (1): 2011-12
  - runners-up (2): 2012–13, 2013–14
- National Cup:
  - runners-up (2): 2011–12, 2013–14

== First League Record ==
Season	Pos	G	W	L	SD	Pts	Playoffs	National Cup
2006/07	6	14	3	11	14:33	10	-	QF vs. Luka Bar 0:3
2007/08	5	14	6	8	19:31	16	-	1/8 vs. Gorštak 3:0, QF vs. Rudar 1:3
2008/09	5	16	6	10	19:37	17	-	1/8 vs. Gorštak 3:0, QF vs. Luka Bar 0:3
2009/10	3	20	11	9	39:30	33	SF vs. Galeb 3:1, 2:3, 1:3	1/8 vs. Nikšić 3:0, QF vs. Rudar 3:2, SF vs. Galeb 0:3
2010/11	3	15	12	3	40:16	35	SF vs. Galeb 2:3, 2:3	QF vs. Morača 3:1, SF vs. Luka Bar 1:3
2011/12	1	16	14	2	42:8	43	SF vs. Morača 3:0, 3:1, FINAL vs. Luka Bar 0:3, 0:3, 3:1, 3:2, 3:0	SF vs. Budva 3:0, FINAL vs. Luka Bar 0:3
2012/13	2	16	15	1	47:5	46	SF vs. Morača 3:2, 3:0, FINAL vs. Luka Bar 0:3, 0:3, 1:3	QF vs. Nikšić 3:0, SF vs. Luka Bar 0:3
2013/14	3	14	11	3	34:10	33	SF vs. Galeb 3:1, 3:1, FINAL vs. Luka Bar 1:3, 2:3, 1:3	QF vs. Gimnazijalac 3:0, SF vs. Morača 3:0, FINAL vs. Luka Bar 0:3
2014/15	6	18	8	10	27:36	23	-	QF vs. Rudar 1:3
2015/16	7	18	6	12	27:43	20	-	QF vs. Galeb 0:3

== Venues ==
Despite the fact that teams of SD Budućnost are using Morača Sports Center as their home venue, ŽOK Budućnost is playing its games in smaller sport halls in Podgorica. Main reasons for that decision are small crowd at the games of ŽOK Budućnost (Morača hall's capacity is 4,570) and big costs of technical organisations of game in Morača Sports Center.
At most matches, ŽOK Budućnost is using "Radojica Perović" sport hall as a home venue. Capacity of hall is about 800 seats. Budućnost plays a part of home games in the sports hall of Podgorica Medicine School, whose capacity is 1,050 seats.

== See also ==
- SD Budućnost Podgorica
- Montenegrin women's volley league
- Montenegrin women's volleyball Cup
- Volleyball Federation of Montenegro (OSCG)
