= 2004–05 ULEB Cup Regular Season Group A =

Color key
Qualified to Eighthfinals
Eliminated

	Team	Pld	W	L	PF	PA	Diff
1.	(Greece) PAOK Thessaloniki	10	8	2	866	778	88
2.	(Belgium) Spirou Charleroi	10	7	3	790	734	56
3.	(France) BCM Gravelines	10	5	5	846	846	0
4.	(Germany) ALBA Berlin	10	4	6	839	851	-12
5.	(Serbia and Montenegro) KK Buducnost	10	4	6	801	860	-59
6.	(Hungary) Debreceni Vadkakasok	10	2	8	778	851	-73

== Game 1 ==
November 9

Spirou Charleroi (Belgium)	96–79	(France) BCM Gravelines
Scoring by quarter: 21-16, 28-23, 23-23, 24-17

Charleroi, Belgium

November 9

PAOK Thessaloniki (Greece)	77–69	(Hungary) Debreceni Vadkakasok
Scoring by quarter: 22-16, 22-12, 18-17, 15-24

Debrecen, Hungary

November 9

ALBA Berlin (Germany)	86–70	(Serbia and Montenegro) KK Buducnost
Scoring by quarter: 17-17, 22-14, 25-22, 22-17

Berlin, Germany

== Game 2 ==
November 17

Spirou Charleroi (Belgium)	68–82	(Serbia and Montenegro) KK Buducnost
Scoring by quarter: 18-14, 24-16, 15-17, 25-21

Buducnost, Serbia & Montenegro

November 17

Debreceni Vadkakasok (Hungary)	85–92	(Germany) ALBA Berlin
Scoring by quarter: 27-27, 16-23, 21-23, 21-19

Debrecen, Hungary

November 17

PAOK Thessaloniki (Greece)	83–70	(France) BCM Gravelines
Scoring by quarter: 28-17, 20-19, 21-16, 14-18

Gravelines, France

== Game 3 ==
November 23

PAOK Thessaloniki (Greece)	80–73	(Belgium) Spirou Charleroi
Scoring by quarter: 18-20, 18-18, 19-17, 25-18

Thessaloniki, Greece

November 23

ALBA Berlin (Germany)	94–92 (OT)	(France) BCM Gravelines
Scoring by quarter: 24-19, 22-16, 14-23, 22-24, Overtime: 12-10

Berlin, Germany

November 23

Debreceni Vadkakasok (Hungary)	89–91	(Serbia and Montenegro) KK Buducnost
Scoring by quarter: 15-27, 33-24, 21-18, 20-22

Buducnost, Serbia & Montenegro

== Game 4 ==
November 30

Debreceni Vadkakasok (Hungary)	72–95	(Belgium) Spirou Charleroi
Scoring by quarter: 13-27, 22-23, 12-20, 25-25

Charleroi, Belgium

November 30

BCM Gravelines (France)	108–75	(Serbia and Montenegro) KK Buducnost
Scoring by quarter: 28-18, 28-11, 37-14, 15-32

Gravelines, France

November 30

PAOK Thessaloniki (Greece)	88–94 (OT)	(Germany) ALBA Berlin
Scoring by quarter: 25-16, 19-21, 17-24, 15-15, Overtime: 12-18

Thessaloniki, Greece

== Game 5 ==
December 7

ALBA Berlin (Germany)	57–64	(Belgium) Spirou Charleroi
Scoring by quarter: 15-22, 14-12, 13-11, 15-19

Berlin, Germany

December 7

KK Buducnost (Serbia and Montenegro)	104–98	(Greece) PAOK Thessaloniki
Scoring by quarter: 11-26, 26-19, 31-29, 36-24

Buducnost, Serbia & Montenegro

December 7

Debreceni Vadkakasok (Hungary)	66–70	(France) BCM Gravelines
Scoring by quarter: 22-13, 14-19, 19-18, 11-20

Debrecen, Hungary

== Game 6 ==
December 14

BCM Gravelines (France)	68–72	(Belgium) Spirou Charleroi
Scoring by quarter: 24-19, 26-17, 2-20, 16-16

Gravelines, France

December 14

PAOK Thessaloniki (Greece)	95–76	(Hungary) Debreceni Vadkakasok
Scoring by quarter: 27-14, 26-21, 29-16, 13-25

Thessaloniki, Greece

November 30

ALBA Berlin (Germany)	85–95	(Serbia and Montenegro) KK Buducnost
Scoring by quarter: 25-25, 26-24, 25-18, 9-28

Buducnost, Serbia & Montenegro

== Game 7 ==
December 21

KK Buducnost (Serbia and Montenegro)	56–63	(Belgium) Spirou Charleroi
Scoring by quarter: 16-20, 16-16, 11-10, 13-17

Charleroi, Belgium

December 21

ALBA Berlin (Germany)	83–92	(Hungary) Debreceni Vadkakasok
Scoring by quarter: 23-26, 20-20, 18-24, 22-22

Berlin, Germany

December 21

PAOK Thessaloniki (Greece)	104–82	(France) BCM Gravelines
Scoring by quarter: 28-13, 22-30, 24-21, 30-18

Berlin, Germany

== Game 8 ==
January 4

PAOK Thessaloniki (Greece)	81–74	(Belgium) Spirou Charleroi
Scoring by quarter: 22-16, 22-20, 16-23, 14-23

Charleroi, Belgium

January 4

BCM Gravelines (France)	103–98	(Germany) ALBA Berlin
Scoring by quarter: 24-24, 17-25, 29-17, 33-32

Gravelines, France

January 4

Debreceni Vadkakasok (Hungary)	82–72	(Serbia and Montenegro) KK Buducnost
Scoring by quarter: 23-20, 13-22, 25-14, 21-16

Debrecen, Hungary

== Game 9 ==
January 12

Debreceni Vadkakasok (Hungary)	70–91	(Belgium) Spirou Charleroi
Scoring by quarter: 15-25, 23-15, 11-31, 21-20

Debrecen, Hungary

January 12

KK Buducnost (Serbia and Montenegro)	81–89	(France) BCM Gravelines
Scoring by quarter: 25-18, 22-25, 14-17, 20-29

Buducnost, Serbia & Montenegro

January 12

ALBA Berlin (Germany)	61–68	(Greece) PAOK Thessaloniki
Scoring by quarter: 15-23, 13-7, 10-16, 23-22

Berlin, Germany

== Game 10 ==
January 18

ALBA Berlin (Germany)	89–94 (OT)	(Belgium) Spirou Charleroi
Scoring by quarter: 9-25, 24-13, 18-22, 31-22, Overtime: 7-12

Charleroi, Belgium

January 18

PAOK Thessaloniki (Greece)	92–75	(Serbia and Montenegro) KK Buducnost
Scoring by quarter: 24-20, 19-23, 24-12, 25-20

Thessaloniki, Greece

January 18

BCM Gravelines (France)	85–77	(Hungary) Debreceni Vadkakasok
Scoring by quarter: 27-15, 25-25, 14-16, 19-21

Gravelines, France
