= Bojan Radović =

Montenegrin volleyball player (born 1992)

Personal information
- Nationality: Montenegro
- Born: 27 September 1992 (age 34)
- Height: 203 cm (6 ft 8 in)
- Weight: 100 kg (220 lb)
- Spike: 325 cm (128 in)
- Block: 320 cm (126 in)

Volleyball information
- Number: 24 (national team)

Career
Years	Teams
2015	Budućnost

National team
2015	Montenegro

Bojan Radović (born 27 September 1992) is a Montenegrin volleyball player. He is part of the Montenegro men's national volleyball team. On club level he plays for Budućnost Podgorica.
