= SD Budućnost Podgorica =

Sports society organisation from Podgorica, Montenegro

SD Budućnost
- Full name: Sportsko društvo Budućnost Podgorica
- Nicknames: Plavo-bijeli (The Blue-Whites)
- Sports: 33 active clubs
- Founded: 1925 in Podgorica, Montenegro
- Based in: Podgorica
- Colors: Blue and white
- Official fan club: Varvari (Barbarians)

Budućnost Podgorica, commonly abbreviated as SD Budućnost, is a sports society organisation from Podgorica, Montenegro.

By number of titles and historical results, it is the most successful sports society in Montenegro, and one of the most successful in the territory of former Yugoslavia. In addition to winning many national titles, various SD Budućnost society clubs have been European champions.

Currently, there are 31 clubs in 29 different sports inside the SD Budućnost organisation. One club (men's handball) has been dissolved.

== Clubs ==
Currently, multiple clubs in Montenegro of different sports share the name "Budućnost". Their management is separate and they operate independently from each other.

=== Active clubs ===
Overall 33 active clubs compete in 30 different team and individual sports.

Sport	Club name	Est
Football	Fudbalski klub Budućnost (Men); Ženski fudbalski klub Budućnost (Women)	1925; 2005
Basketball	Košarkaški klub Budućnost (Men); Ženski košarkaški klub Budućnost (Women)	1949; 1949
Handball	RK Budućnost Podgorica (Men); Ženski rukometni klub Budućnost (Women)	1949; 1949
Volleyball	Odbojkaški klub Budućnost; Ženski odbojkaški klub Budućnost (Women)	1936; 1994
Athletics	Atletski klub Budućnost	1945
Karate	Karate klub Budućnost	1969
Boxing	Bokserski klub Budućnost	1945
Table Tennis	Stonoteniski klub Budućnost	1952
Judo	Džudo klub Budućnost	1963
Rugby	Ragbi klub Budućnost	2012
Rowing	Veslački Klub Budućnost	2012
Kayaking	Kajakaški klub Budućnost	2010
Horsing	Sportski konjički klub Budućnost	2013
Bocce	Boćarski Klub Budućnost	1995
Shooting sports	Streljački klub Budućnost	1948
Hiking	Planinarski klub Budućnost	2011
Chess	Šahovski klub Budućnost	2007
Taekwondo	Tekvondo Klub Budućnost	2004
Sambo	Sambo klub Budućnost	1997
Aikido	Aikido klub Budućnost	1995
Savate	Savate boks klub Budućnost	1987
Kendo	Kendo klub Budućnost	2000
Ballooning	Balonarski klub Budućnost	2002
Sport fishing	Sportsko ribolovni klub Budućnost	1970
Fly fishing	Sportsko rekreativni fly fishing klub Budućnost	2010
Jujutsu	Jiu jitsu klub Budućnost	2000
Brazilian jiu-jitsu	Brazilian jiu-jitsu klub Budućnost	2008
Kung fu	Wushu Kung fu klub Budućnost	2004
Unifight	Unifight klub Budućnost	2008
Water polo	Plivački vaterpolo klub Budućnost	2008

=== Dissolved clubs ===
The men's handball club RK Budućnost Podgorica, which had two champion titles, was dissolved at 2011. From 1998 to 2002, in Podgorica there was a water polo and swimming club (PVK Podgorica), but not as a part of Budućnost sports club.

== Honours and titles ==
=== Champions of Europe ===
Teams and sportists of SD Budućnost Podgorica won numerous titles of champions in the highest-level European competitions for clubs. Among them, in team sports, the most successful is women's handball club Budućnost, and in individual sports is the Karate Club Budućnost.

In women's handball, ŽRK Budućnost won six titles in European competitions:

- Champions League: 2012, 2015
- Women's EHF Cup Winners' Cup: 1985, 2006, 2010
- Women's EHF Cup: 1987

Karate Klub Budućnost won one title of European team champions, and the competitors of Karate Club Budućnost won 17 titles of European champion.

Two football players who started their career in FK Budućnost won the UEFA Champions League, Dejan Savićević with A.C. Milan and Predrag Mijatović with Real Madrid C.F. Both players scored goals in the UEFA Champions League final matches.

=== Honours / team sports ===
Teams of SD Budućnost in the four most popular sports (football, handball, basketball, and volleyball) have won 149 national and international trophies. Among them are 6 trophies of European competition winners, 10 regional (South-European, Balkans or Adriatic/former Yugoslavia) leagues, 68 titles of champion of SFR Yugoslavia, FR Yugoslavia, Serbia and Montenegro or Montenegro and 52 national cup trophies. Also, Budućnost Podgorica was named Best Club of Yugoslavia four times.

==== Budućnost Football Club ====
- National Championships: 4 (2007–08, 2011–12, 2016–17, 2019–20)
- National Cups: 2 (2012–13, 2018–19)

==== Budućnost Women's Football Club ====
- National Championships: 2 (2008–09, 2009–10)

==== Budućnost Women's Handball Club ====
- EHF Champions League: 2 (2011–12, 2014–15)
- EHF Cup Winners' Cup: 3 (1984–85, 2005–06, 2009–10)
- EHF Cup: 1 (1986–87)
- National Championships: 31 (1984–85, 1988–89, 1989–90, 1991–92, 1992–93, 1993–1994, 1994–95, 1995–96, 1996–97, 1997–98, 1998–99, 1999–00, 2000–01, 2001–02, 2002–03, 2003–04, 2004–05, 2005–06, 2006–07, 2007–08, 2008–09, 2009–10, 2010–11, 2011–12, 2012–13, 2013–14, 2014–15, 2015–16, 2016–17, 2017–18, 2018–19)
- National Cups: 24 (1983–84, 1988–89, 1994–95, 1995–96, 1996–97, 1997–98, 1999–00, 2000–01, 2001–02, 2004–05, 2005–06, 2006–07, 2007–08, 2008–09, 2009–10, 2010–11, 2011–12, 2012–13, 2013–14, 2014–15, 2015–16, 2016–17, 2017–18, 2018–19)
- Women's Regional Handball League: 6 (2009–10, 2010–11, 2011–12, 2012–13, 2013–14, 2018–19)
- The Best Club of Yugoslavia award: 4 (1984–85, 1986–87, 1992–93, 1997–98)

==== Budućnost Handball Club ====
- National Championships: 2 (2008–09, 2009–10)

==== Budućnost Basketball Club ====
- ABA League: 1 (2017–18)
- National Championships: 15 (1998–99, 1999–00, 2000–01, 2006–07, 2007–08, 2008–09, 2009–10, 2010–11, 2011–12, 2012–13, 2013–14, 2014–15, 2015–16, 2016–17, 2018–19)
- National Cups: 15 (1995–96, 1997–98, 2000–01, 2006–07, 2007–08, 2008–09, 2009–10, 2010–11, 2011–12, 2013–14, 2014–15, 2015–16, 2016–17, 2017–18, 2018–19)

==== Budućnost Women's Basketball Club ====
- Regional Adriatic (WABA) League: 3 (2015–16, 2017–18, 2019–20)
- National Championships: 12 (2002–03, 2003–04, 2006–07, 2007–08, 2011–12, 2012–13, 2013–14, 2014–15, 2015–16, 2016–17, 2017–18, 2018–19)
- National Cups: 12 (2006–07, 2007–08, 2010–11, 2011–12, 2012–13, 2013–14, 2014–15, 2015–16, 2016–17, 2017–18, 2018–19, 2019–20)

==== Budućnost Volleyball Club ====
- National Championships: 5 (2001–02, 2004–05, 2005–06, 2006–07, 2007–08)
- National Cups: 4 (2000–01, 2006–07, 2007–08, 2008–09)

==== Budućnost Women's Volleyball Club ====
- National Championships: 1 (2011–12)

== Supporters ==
Like in the other former-Yugoslav states, where football is the most attended sport, Football Club Budućnost is the most popular sports society in Podgorica and Montenegro. Among them, the biggest attendances in history was had by FK Budućnost, KK Budućnost and ŽRK Budućnost.

With record attendance during the 70s and 80s, when their games in Podgorica were watched by up to 20,000 fans, matches of FK Budućnost today are the most attended in Montenegrin First League. Traditionally, Budućnost is the most watched guest team in the same competition.

With continuously full stands at the European games (average attendance 5,000), ŽRK Budućnost is the club with the highest average attendance in the history of Women's EHF Champions League.

Since the 80s, KK Budućnost has been another popular club, whose important games are watched by full stands in the Morača sports hall. Today, home games of KK Budućnost are among the most attended in regional ABA League. In the 90s, when Budućnost earned their first trophies and played their first games in Euroleague, their matches were attended by 7,000 spectators. Since 2004, the capacity of Morača hall has been reduced.

From 1999 to 2004, games of Volleyball Club Budućnost were extremely popular. Their final match for the first title in the club's history (2001–02) against Budvanska Rivijera Budva in Podgorica was watched by 7,500 spectators. That was a historically record attendance in Yugoslav volleyball club competitions.

=== Varvari ===
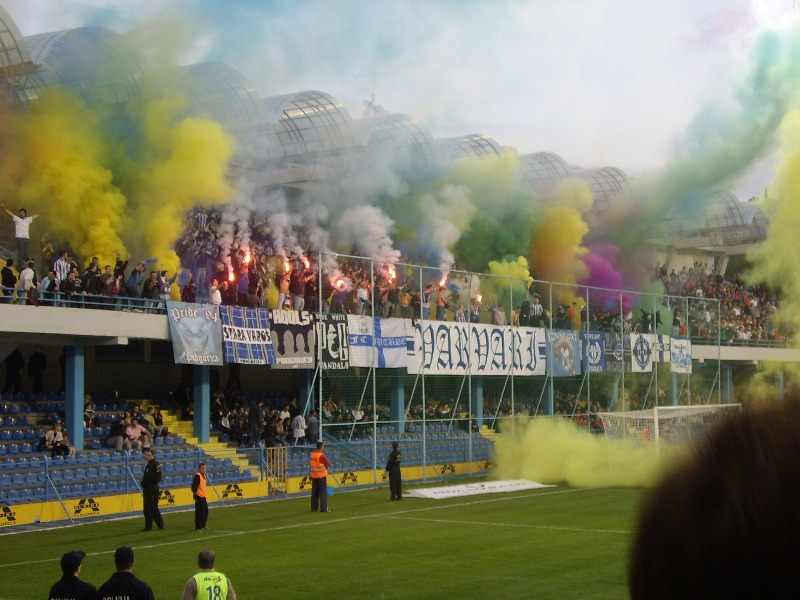
Varvari at a Montenegrin First League home match

Buducnost ultras are known as Varvari (Barbarians), a group founded in 1987. The group's traditional colours are blue and white, which are also the colours of all the Budućnost sports clubs.

Today, Varvari are attending football, basketball and handball matches. In the past, they also attended volleyball matches.

For FK Budućnost Podgorica home games, Varvari occupy the northern stand (Sjever) of the Podgorica city stadium. They also have a reserved stand at the Morača Sports Center, as supporters of KK Buducnost basketball club.

The focal point for the group during the late 1990s was the basketball club, which started investing heavily while the football club toiled in the lower half of the table.

Since their foundation years, Varvari gained a reputation of being a violent group, and in recent history they made a few big accidents on the football matches. At First League 2004-05 game Budućnost - Partizan Belgrade, flares, blocks, construction materials and similar objects were thrown from the North stand to the pitch and match was abandoned for 15 minutes. Year later, game Budućnost - Crvena Zvezda Belgrade was suspended for two hours after home supporters (Varvari) threw tear gas on the pitch and, after that, attacked visitors' ultras. On the spring 2006, there was a crowd violence on the local rivals game Budućnost - Zeta. In the Montenegrin First League, numerous matches of FK Budućnost were suspended due to crowd violence or crowd-invasion to the pitch. During the last seasons, there was an escalation of violence on Montenegrin Derby games.

They are the best organised and largest fan group in Montenegro. According to many fan magazines from the Balkan they are the only fans in Montenegro who are on the level of the largest fan groups from ex-Yugoslavia.

== Venues and facilities ==
SD Budućnost clubs play in the main sport objects in Podgorica. Notable grounds are Stadion Pod Goricom and Morača Sports Hall.

Below is a list of venues and facilities used by clubs under Budućnost Sports Society.

Venue	Built	Renov	Capacity	Sports	Tenants
Stadion Pod Goricom	1947	2006	15,230	football	FK Budućnost, ŽFK Budućnost
Morača Sports Hall	1983	2005	4,570	basketball, handball, volleyball, karate	KK Budućnost, ŽRK Budućnost, OK Budućnost, KK Budućnost
Ljubović Shooting Center	1981	-	700	shooting	SK Budućnost
Boxing center Njegošev park	1960	-	-	boxing, MMA	BK Budućnost, SBK Budućnost, JJK Budućnost, BJJK Budućnost
Morača Sports Center (Combat sports hall)	1983	-	-	judo, karate, taekwondo, sambo	KK Budućnost, JK Budućnost, TK Budućnost, SK Budućnost
Morača Sports Center (Small hall)	1983	-	-	kendo	KK Budućnost
Aikido hall Ljubović	2012	-	-	aikido	AK Budućnost
Tološi stadium	1964	2002	1,000	football, rugby	RK Budućnost
Medicine School hall	2006	-	1,050	volleyball	OK Budućnost, ŽOK Budućnost
Equestrian sports center (Gornja Gorica)	2005	-	-	horsing	SKK Budućnost
ŠK Budućnost hall	2008	-	-	chess	ŠK Budućnost
House of basketball (Donji Kokoti)	2010	-	-	basketball	KK Budućnost, ŽKK Budućnost
Basketball court Njegošev park	1955	2000	1,200	basketball	KK Budućnost
FK Budućnost training ground (Stari Aerodrom Camp)	2008	-	800	football	FK Budućnost
Mareza training ground	2001	-	-	football	FK Budućnost

== See also ==
- FK Budućnost Podgorica
- ŽFK Budućnost Podgorica
- ŽRK Budućnost Podgorica
- KK Budućnost Podgorica
- ŽKK Budućnost Podgorica
- ŽOK Budućnost Podgorica
- RK Budućnost Podgorica
- RK Budućnost Podgorica
- Rugby klub Budućnost Podgorica
- Podgorica City Stadium
- Morača Sports Center
- List of FK Budućnost seasons
- Montenegrin Derby
