= List of Montenegrin sportspeople =

List of Montenegrin sportspeople

== Athletics ==
- Danijel Furtula
- Slađana Perunović

== Basketball ==
- Predrag Drobnjak
- Jelena Dubljević
- Duško Ivanović
- Iva Perovanović
- Vlado Šćepanović
- Predrag Savović

== Football (soccer) players ==
- Branko Brnović
- Dragoljub Brnović
- Andrija Delibašić
- Dragoje Leković
- Predrag "Peđa" Mijatović
- Ljubomir Radanović
- Srđan Radonjić
- Dejan Savićević
- Mirko Vučinić
- Simon Vukčević
- Refik Šabanadžović
- Anto Drobnjak
- Bojan Brnović
- Igor Gluščević
- Vukašin Poleksić
- Igor Burzanović
- Dragan Bogavac
- Dejan Ognjanović
- Branko Bošković Serbia born Montenegro internationals
- Vlado Jeknić
- Milan Jovanović Serbia born Montenegro internationals
- Stevan Jovetić
- Vladimir Božović
- Jovan Tanasijević Serbia born Montenegro internationals
- Savo Pavićević
- Duško Đurišić
- Marko Baša Serbia born Montenegro internationals

== Handball ==
- Maja Savić
- Petar Kapisoda
- Ljiljana Mugoša
- Svetlana Mugoša
- Radivoj Krivokapić

== Judo ==
- Dragomir Bečanović
- Srđan Mrvaljević

== Tennis ==
- Danka Kovinić

== Volleyball ==
- Miodrag Gvozdenović
- Igor Vušurović

== Waterpolo ==
- Vladimir Gojković
- Aleksandar Ivović
- Mlađan Janović
- Nikola Janović
- Predrag Jokić
- Veljko Uskoković
- Nenad Vukanić
- Boris Zloković
