= Montenegrin women's volley league =

Highest professional women's volleyball league in Montenegro

Montenegrin Women's Volleyball First League
- Sport: Volleyball
- Founded: 2006
- Founder: Volleyball Federation of Montenegro
- No. of teams: 10
- Country: Montenegro
- Continent: (European Union) Europe
- Most recent champion: Herceg Novi
- Most titles: Luka Bar (12 titles)
- Broadcaster: RTCG
- Website: Montenegrin Volleyball Federation

The Montenegrin Women's Volley League (Montenegrin: Prva crnogorska ženska odbojkaška liga), is the highest professional women's volleyball league in Montenegro. It is run by the Montenegrin Volleyball Federation.

== History ==
=== Before independence ===
First volleyball competitions for women in Montenegro were organised at first half of 90's. At the time of FR Yugoslavia, Montenegrin Republic Volleyball Federation organised Republic League, with first season at 1995.
Winners of Montenegrin Republic League (1995–2006) were: AOK Rudar Pljevlja (3), ŽOK Podgorica (3), ŽOK Budućnost Podgorica (2), ŽOK Ibar Rožaje (1), ŽOK Nikšić (1) and ŽOK Studentski centar Podgorica (1).
At the same time, than the only professional women's volleyball club from Montenegro – ŽOK Luka Bar participated in Yugoslav First League since 1994. and, after that, in European competitions. Biggest success in Yugoslav First League, Luka Bar achieved on season 2003-2004, when they finished season on the third place.
While Luka Bar played constantly in the First League, ŽOK Rudar played two seasons in Yugoslav Second League (2002-2003, 2003-2004) and ŽOK Podgorica one season (2003-2004).

=== After independence ===
In 2006, Montenegro split from Serbia. Following that, the First women's volley league of Montenegro was formed as a top national competition. Since founded, Montenegrin League had a various number of participants, from 8 to 10. Except the First League, women's volleyball competitions system in Montenegro including the Second league and Montenegrin Cup. ŽOK Luka Bar, has been the most successful team, winning 12 national champions' titles. Since the 2016–17 season, the winner of the Montenegrin First League has played in the CEV Women's Champions League.

==== Competition format ====
Every season of First League have two parts. During the first, 'regular season', there is a round-robin system in which all clubs play two games against every single opponent. At the end of the first part, four best-placed teams are playing in the playoffs. Additionally, two worst-placed teams are playing in the playout series.
In the playoffs semifinals, the first-placed team is playing against fourth, and second against third. Placement in finals is gained by teams which won two matches. The final-series is played until one opponent gains three wins.

==== Number of participants ====
From the season 2006/07, Montenegrin First League had various number of participants on regular season, from 6 to 10.

- 2006/07 – 8 clubs
- 2007/08 – 8 clubs
- 2008/09 – 7 clubs
- 2009/10 – 7 clubs
- 2010/11 – 6 clubs
- 2011/12 – 9 clubs
- 2012/13 – 9 clubs
- 2013/14 – 8 clubs
- 2014/15 – 10 clubs
- 2015/16 – 10 clubs
- 2016/17 – 10 clubs
- 2017/18 – 8 clubs
- 2018/19 – 8 clubs
- 2019/20 – 10 clubs
- 2020/21 – 9 clubs
- 2021/22 – 10 clubs
- 2022/23 – 10 clubs
- 2023/24 – 10 clubs

== Champions ==
Since the inaugural season (2006/07), three clubs have been the champions of the Montenegrin women's volley league. ŽOK Luka Bar won 11 titles, ŽOK Galeb 2 titles and ŽOK Budućnost 1 title. Below is the list of top-placed teams by every single season.

=== Titles by seasons ===
Season	Champion	Runner-up	Third	Playoffs final series
2006–07	Luka Bar	Podgorica	Rudar	Luka Bar – Podgorica 3–2
2007–08	Luka Bar	Podgorica	Rudar	Luka Bar – Podgorica 3–0
2008–09	Luka Bar	Rudar	Podgorica	Luka Bar – Rudar 3–1
2009–10	Galeb	Luka Bar	Budućnost	Galeb – Luka Bar 3–1
2010–11	Galeb	Luka Bar	Budućnost	Galeb – Luka Bar 3–1
2011–12	Budućnost	Luka Bar	Morača	Budućnost – Luka Bar 3–2
2012–13	Luka Bar	Budućnost	Rudar	Luka Bar – Budućnost 3–0
2013–14	Luka Bar	Budućnost	Galeb	Luka Bar – Budućnost 3–0
2014–15	Luka Bar	Morača	Galeb	Luka Bar – Morača 3–0
2015–16	Luka Bar	Rudar	Morača	Luka Bar – Rudar 3–0
2016–17	Luka Bar	Galeb	Rudar	Luka Bar – Galeb 3–0
2017–18	Luka Bar	Rudar	Galeb	Luka Bar – Rudar 3–0
2018–19	Luka Bar	Morača	Galeb	Luka Bar – Morača 3–0
2019–20	Luka Bar	Morača	Galeb	Canceled due to the coronavirus pandemic
2020–21	Luka Bar	Galeb	Morača	Luka Bar – Galeb 3–2
2021–22	Galeb	Luka Bar	Albatros	Galeb - Luka Bar 3-0
2022–23	Herceg Novi	Galeb	Luka Bar	Herceg Novi - Galeb 3-0
2023–24	Herceg Novi	Luka Bar	Galeb	Herceg Novi - Luka Bar 3-0

=== Titles by team ===
Club	Winners	Runners-up	Winning years
ŽOK Luka Bar	12	4	2006–07, 2007–08, 2008–09, 2012–13, 2013–14, 2014–15, 2015–16, 2016–17, 2017–18, 2018–19, 2019–20, 2020–21
ŽOK Herceg Novi	4	-	2022–23, 2023-24, 2024-25, 2025-26
ŽOK Galeb Bar	3	2	2009–10, 2010–11, 2021-22
ŽOK Budućnost Podgorica	1	2	2011–12
AOK Rudar Pljevlja	-	3	
ŽOK Morača Podgorica	-	3	
ŽOK Podgorica	-	2	

== Performances by clubs ==
=== Final placements ===
Clubs which played every single season in Montenegrin Volley League are ŽOK Luka Bar and ŽOK Gimnazijalac. Below is the list of final placements of every club by single season.

Club	07	08	09	10	11	12	13	14	15	16	17	18	19	20	21	22	23
Albatros	–	–	–	–	–	–	–	–	–	–	–	–	–	6	4	3	4
Akademija	–	–	–	–	–	–	–	–	–	–	–	–	–	–	–	4	5
Budućnost	6	4	5	3	3	1	2	2	6	5	6	6	–	10	9	9	6
Budvanska Rivijera	–	–	–	–	–	5	6	6	5	6	4	5	–	–	–	–	–
Galeb	–	5	4	1	1	6	5	3	3	4	2	3	3	3	2	1	2
Gimnazijalac	7	6	7	6	6	9	7	8	8	9	9	8	5	5	7	10	10
Gorštak	–	–	–	–	–	–	–	–	9	10	10	–	–	–	–	–	–
Herceg Novi	–	–	–	–	–	8	8	–	–	7	8	7	–	–	–	–	1
Ibar	4	8	–	–	–	–	–	–	–	–	–	–	–	–	–	–	–
Jedinstvo	–	–	–	–	–	–	–	–	–	–	–	–	7	9	5	5	8
Lovćen	–	–	–	–	–	–	–	–	10	–	–	–	–	–	–	–	–
Luka Bar	1	1	1	2	2	2	1	1	1	1	1	1	1	1	1	2	3
Mediteran	–	–	–	–	–	–	–	–	–	–	–	–	6	8	8	8	9
Mladost	–	–	–	7	–	–	–	–	–	–	–	–	–	–	–	–	–
Morača	–	–	–	–	4	3	4	4	2	3	5	4	2	2	3	6	7
Nikšić	5	7	–	–	–	7	9	7	7	8	7	9	8	7	–	–	–
Podgorica	2	2	3	–	–	–	–	–	–	–	–	–	–	–	–	–	–
Rudar	3	3	2	4	5	4	3	5	4	2	3	2	4	4	6	7	–
Sokogym	–	–	6	5	–	–	–	–	–	–	–	–	–	–	–	–	–
Sutjeska	8	–	–	–	–	–	–	–	–	–	–	–	–	–	–	–	–

07 = season 2006/07

=== All-time participants ===
Since its foundation, 20 clubs have participated. Below is a list of participants with the number of seasons in the First League and all-time score. Matches from the playoffs series are included.

Club	Town	Ssn	First	Last	G	W	L	Pts
Luka Bar	Bar	17	2006–07	2022–23	370	328	42	698
Galeb	Bar	16	2007–08	2022–23	309	210	99	519
Rudar	Pljevlja	16	2006–07	2021–22	300	169	131	469
Budućnost	Podgorica	15	2006–07	2022–23	284	123	161	407
Morača	Podgorica	12	2010–11	2022–23	236	135	101	371
Gimnazijalac	Kotor	17	2006–07	2022–23	273	55	218	328
Nikšić	Nikšić	11	2006–07	2019–20	179	41	138	220
Budvanska Rivijera	Budva	7	2011–12	2017–18	118	57	61	175
Herceg Novi	Herceg Novi	6	2011–12	2022–23	107	45	62	152
Podgorica	Podgorica	4	2006–07	2009–10	79	45	34	124
Albatros	Herceg Novi	4	2019–20	2022–23	73	43	30	116
Jedinstvo	Bijelo Polje	5	2018–19	2022–23	81	26	55	107
Mediteran	Budva	5	2018–19	2022–23	81	19	62	100
Gorštak	Kolašin	3	2014–15	2016–17	54	7	47	61
Akademija	Tivat	2	2021–22	2022–23	38	21	17	59
Sokogym	Podgorica	2	2008–09	2009–10	34	14	20	48
Ibar	Rožaje	2	2006–07	2007–08	34	9	25	43
Lovćen	Cetinje	1	2014–15	2014–15	18	2	16	20
Mladost	Tivat	1	2009–10	2009–10	18	1	17	19
Sutjeska	Nikšić	1	2006–07	2006–07	14	1	13	15

Note: 2 points for win, 1 for defeat

== Current season ==
Season 2023–24 is 18th edition of Montenegrin women's volley league. League have ten participants. League started in October 2023 and will finish in May 2024.

Team	Arena	Capacity	City
Akademija	Župa	900	Tivat
Albatros	SC Igalo	2,000	Herceg Novi
Budućnost	Medical School	1,000	Podgorica
Galeb	Topolica	3,000	Bar
Herceg Novi	SC Igalo	2,000	Herceg Novi
Jedinstvo	SC Nikoljac	3,000	Bijelo Polje
Luka Bar	Topolica	3,000	Bar
Morača	Medical School	1,000	Podgorica
Mediteran	Mediterranean SC	1,500	Budva
Rudar	Ada SC	3,000	Pljevlja

== Second League ==
Competition was founded at 2006, with first season 2006–07.
At the end of every season, a new member of the First League became a winner of Second Montenegrin League. If winner is the 'B' team (second team) of some club, promotion is gained to next best-placed participant of Second League.
So far, winners of the Montenegrin Second Women Volley League were:

Season	Champion	Runner-up
2006–07	Galeb Bar	Mladost Tivat
2007–08	Rudar 'B' Pljevlja	Sokogym Podgorica
2008–09	Mladost Tivat	Ibar Rožaje
2009–10	Galeb 'B' Bar	Morača Podgorica
2010–11	Nikšić	Herceg Novi
2011–12	DNP	DNP
2012–13	Galeb 'B' Bar	Morača 'B' Podgorica
2013–14	Galeb 'B' Bar	Lovćen Cetinje
2014–15	Rudar 'B' Pljevlja	Ibar Rožaje
2015–16	Galeb 'B' Bar	Luka Bar 'B'
2016–17	Galeb 'B' Bar	Ibar Rožaje
2017–18	Galeb 'B' Bar	Luka Bar 'B'
2018–19	Luka Bar 'B'	Budućnost Podgorica
2019–20	Interrupted due to the coronavirus pandemic	
2020–21	Akademija Tivat	Gorštak Kolašin
2021–22	Herceg Novi	Gorštak Kolašin
2022–23	Rudar Pljevlja	Tempo Nikšić

Season 2019-20 was interrupted due to the coronavirus pandemic. Montenegrin volleyball federation decided that the champions of the Second League were the winners of five groups from the preliminary phase of competition (Ivangrad; Herceg Novi; Akademija; Galeb "B"; Gorštak).

== Montenegrin women's volleyball clubs in European competitions ==
Montenegrin women's volleyball clubs have been participating in the CEV competitions since the 1998–99 season.
The first team which competed in European cups was ŽOK Luka Bar. ŽOK Galeb and ŽOK Herceg Novi are the other teams to play in CEV competitions.
Montenegrin women's volleyball teams played in Women's CEV Cup and CEV Women's Challenge Cup, and from the season 2016–17 in the qualifiers for CEV Women's Champions League.
During the overall history, three Montenegrin clubs have played in CEV competitions.

Team	Seasons	G	W	L
ŽOK Luka Bar	7	21	2	19
ŽOK Herceg Novi	2	9	3	6
ŽOK Galeb Bar	2	4	0	4

As of the end of CEV competitions 2023–24 season.

== See also ==
- Montenegrin women's volleyball Cup
- Volleyball Federation of Montenegro (OSCG)
- Montenegro women's national volleyball team
- Montenegrin Volleyball League
