= Topolica Sport Hall =

Arena in Bar, Montenegro

Coordinates: 42.1000°N 19.1000°E

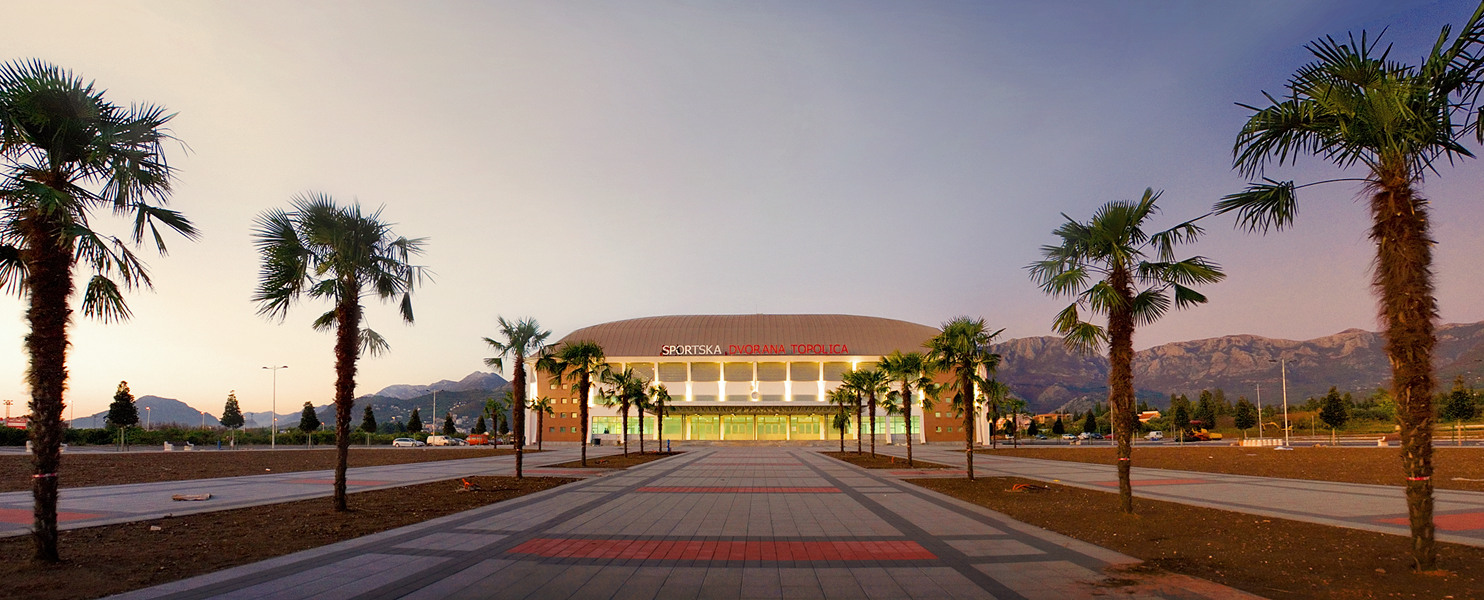
- Interactive map of Topolica Sport Hall
- Address: Ul, 85 Bulevar Revolucije, Bar
- Location: Bar, Montenegro
- Capacity: 2,625

Construction
- Opened: November 23, 2009

Tenants
- KK Mornar Bar (2009–present); RK Mornar Bar; ŽOK Luka Bar; OK Galeb

Website
- srcegrada.me/en

Topolica Sport Hall (Montenegrin: Спортска дворана Тополица, romanized: Sportska dvorana Topolica) is a multi-purpose indoor, modern arena located in the city of Bar, Montenegro. It is the home ground of basketball club Mornar and has a capacity of 2,625 spectators.

On the ground floor of this two-storey hall there is a field suitable for basketball, handball, volleyball and regular indoor sports. Its area is 1,290 m2, capacity 2,625 spectators. In addition to the mentioned court, the hall also has a space intended for recreational table tennis, a gym of 490 m2, six locker rooms, a locker room for judges, a press center equipped with a complete projection and audio system, a conference room with a capacity of about 50 seats and a VIP lounge.

The hall is surrounded by a pedestrian platform with landscaped green areas, as well as a parking space with 700 seats. A parking space for buses, police cars and ambulances has also been provided. It also has technical accessibility standards that ensure the unimpeded movement of children, the elderly, people with reduced mobility and people with disabilities, as well as any modern facility intended for holding various events.

== History ==
The arena was officially opened on November 23, 2009. The value of the hall with 2,600 seats was 8.5 million euros, financed mainly from the budget of the Municipality of Bar, with part of the funds provided by the Government. The Municipality also arranged and equipped the 6.3-hectare area surrounding the arena. The hall was opened by the Prime Minister of Montenegro, Milo Đukanović, and the President of the Municipality, Žarko Pavićević, also addressed those present. After the ceremony and an almost one-hour break, a concert by Vlado Georgiev was held, preceded by a performance by Andrea Demirović.
