= ŽOK Luka Bar =

Montenegrin women's volleyball club

- 2016–17
- Full name: Ženski odbojkaški klub Luka Bar
- Founded: 1992
- Ground: Topolica Sport Hall, Bar, Montenegro (Capacity: 2,625)
- Manager: (Montenegro) Vladimir Milačić
- League: Montenegrin women's volley league
- 2015–16: 1st

Uniforms
Home	Away

ŽOK Luka Bar is a Montenegrin women's volleyball club founded in 1992. Based in seaside town of Bar, named after Port of Bar (Montenegrin: Luka Bar), it's the most successful Montenegrin women's volleyball club, with the most titles in domestic competitions.

== History ==
Founded as a part of Port of Bar, ŽOK Luka Bar soon became most successful Montenegrin club, and the only club from Montenegro which played in FR Yugoslavia / Serbia and Montenegro First League. Since the middle of nineties, Luka Bar is continuously playing in the elite-round of women's volleyball, often with participation in European Cups.
From 1994 to 2006, biggest success of Luka Bar in domestic competitions was placement to the Yugoslav Cup finals on seasons 1997-98 and 2002-03.
After the Montenegrin independence, Luka Bar became first winner of Montenegrin women's volley league and Montenegrin women's volleyball Cup.
For the first time in club's history, Luka Bar participated in CEV Women's Champions League during the season 2016-17, but eliminated in first leg against Estonian team Kohila VC (2-3; 1-3). Luka Bar continued international season 2016-17 in Women's CEV Cup - eliminating VC Tirol Innsbruck (3-1; 1-3) in first leg, but then defeated against Budowlani Łódź (0-3; 0-3).
Until today, Luka Bar won numerous trophies in domestic competitions and became the greatest women's volleyball club in Montenegro, and among most successful at the territory of former Yugoslavia.

== Honours and achievements ==
- National Championship:
  - winners (12): 2006–07, 2007–08, 2008–09, 2012–13, 2013–14, 2014–15, 2015–16, 2016–17, 2017–18, 2018–19
  - runners-up (3): 2009–10, 2010–11, 2011–12
- National Cup:
  - winners (7): 2006–07, 2010–11, 2011–12, 2012–13, 2013–14, 2014–15, 2016–17
  - runners-up (5): 2007-08, 2008–09, 2009–10, 2017–18, 2018–19
- FR Yugoslavia Cup:
  - runners-up (2): 1997-98, 2002–03

== European competitions ==
Season	Competition	Round	Opponent	Result	Venue
1998–99	CEV Cup	Round 2	(Germany) USC Münster	0:3	Münster
1998–99	CEV Cup	Round 2	(Switzerland) Kanti Schaffhausen	0:3	Münster
1998–99	CEV Cup	Round 2	(Luxembourg) Volley 80 Pétange	3:0	Münster
2007–08	Challenge Cup	Round 1	(Poland) Muszynianka	0:3	Bar
2007–08	Challenge Cup	Round 1	(Poland) Muszynianka	0:3	Muszyna
2008–09	Challenge Cup	Round 1	(Bosnia and Herzegovina) Jedinstvo Brčko	0:3	Bar
2008–09	Challenge Cup	Round 1	(Bosnia and Herzegovina) Jedinstvo Brčko	0:3	Brčko
2009–10	Challenge Cup	Round 1	(Germany) Dresdner SC	0:3	Dresden
2009–10	Challenge Cup	Round 1	(Germany) Dresdner SC	0:3	Bar
2012–13	Challenge Cup	Round 1	(Cyprus) Apollon Limassol	1:3	Bar
2012–13	Challenge Cup	Round 1	(Cyprus) Apollon Limassol	1:3	Limassol
2016–17	CEV Women's Champions League	Round 1	(Estonia) Kohila VC	1:3	Kohila
2016–17	CEV Women's Champions League	Round 1	(Estonia) Kohila VC	2:3	Bar
2016–17	Women's CEV Cup	Round 1	(Austria) VC Tirol Innsbruck	1:3	Innsbruck
2016–17	Women's CEV Cup	Round 1	(Austria) VC Tirol Innsbruck	3:1	Bar
2016–17	Women's CEV Cup	Round 2	(Poland) Budowlani Łódź	0:3	Bar
2016–17	Women's CEV Cup	Round 2	(Poland) Budowlani Łódź	0:3	Łódź

== Team squad ==
Season 2016–2017, as of January 2017.

Number	Player	Position	Height (m)	Weight (kg)	Birth date
	(Montenegro) Dragana Peruničić	Outside hitter	1.87	65	19 November 1992 (age 33)
	(Montenegro) Danijela Barjaktarović	Setter	1.75	60	1 March 1996 (age 30)
	(Montenegro) Marija Bojović	Setter	1.79	65	19 February 1991 (age 35)
	(Montenegro) Melisa Cenović	Libero	1.69	60	24 August 1998 (age 27)
	(Montenegro) Ksenija Dević	Libero	1.65	50	5 February 2001 (age 25)
	(Montenegro) Sejla Duraković	Outside hitter	1.82	68	25 May 1999 (age 26)
	(Serbia) Vesna Joksimović	Outside hitter	1.82	70	25 December 1984 (age 41)
	(Montenegro) Tijana Kruta	Middle blocker	1.82	68	30 November 1998 (age 27)
	(Montenegro) Jasna Rosić	Outside hitter	1.79	53	16 January 2001 (age 25)
	(Montenegro) Mirjana Rosić	Middle blocker	1.87	70	2 January 1995 (age 31)
	(Montenegro) Milana Rovčanin	Outside hitter	1.78	69	28 May 1992 (age 33)
	(Montenegro) Anja Vujanović	Middle blocker	1.87	71	8 August 1995 (age 30)
	(Montenegro) Dijana Vuković	Opposite	1.87	68	22 March 1999 (age 27)
Coach: (Montenegro) Vladimir Milačić

== See also ==
- Montenegrin women's volley league
- Montenegrin women's volleyball Cup
- Volleyball Federation of Montenegro (OSCG)
