= Montenegrin Volleyball League =

Sports league in Montenegro

- Sport: Volleyball
- Founded: 2006
- No. of teams: 6
- Country: Montenegro
- Confederation: CEV
- Continent: Europe
- Most recent champion: OK Budva (3rd title)
- Most titles: Budvanska Rivijera (9 titles)
- Broadcaster: RTCG
- Level on pyramid: 1
- Related competitions: CEV Champions League; CEV Cup; CEV Challenge Cup
- Website: oscg.me

The Montenegrin Volleyball League (montenegrin: Odbojkaški savez Crne Gore) is the highest level of men's volleyball in Montenegro and it is organized by Montenegrin Volleyball Federation. In the Montenegrin Volleyball League currently competes 8 clubs.

== History ==
=== Before independence ===
In the period before independence, Montenegrin volleyball clubs played in SFR Yugoslavia, FR Yugoslavia and Serbia and Montenegro competitions. From the season 1980-81, OK Budućnost from Podgorica became a permanent member of Second Yugoslav League, where other Montenegrin teams also played one or few seasons (Budvanska Rivijera, Rudar Pljevlja, Brskovo Mojkovac, Lovćen Cetinje). First time when Montenegrin teams played in the top-tier was during the season 1991-92. During that edition, in Yugoslav First League debuted two clubs from Montenegro - OK Budućnost and OK Budvanska Rivijera (at that time OK Avala). While Budućnost remained a member of top-tier all the time, Budvanska Rivijera was relegated after two consecutive seasons. Team from Budva made a comeback to the top-tier on season 1997-98.
From the end of nineties, in FR Yugoslavia and Serbia and Montenegro, two clubs played important role, with four champion titles. First significant success made Budućnost on season 1997-98, as they participated in the playoff finals. Team from Podgorica didn't succeed to win the title, as they were defeated in the three-game series against Vojvodina (0-3 in series).
The first national title for some Montenegrin team came on season 2000-01. In the playoff final series, Budvanska Rivijera held the title after four games against Milicionar (3-1 in series).
Next year, two Montenegrin teams played in the Yugoslav playoff finals. Budućnost won the final stage against Budvanska Rivijera (3-1 in series) and held the first trophy in the club's history. Their four games were remembered by big rivalry and the highest attendance in the history of final series (average 4,500 per game), while one of the games in Podgorica attended 7,500 spectators, which remained the all-time record attendance for Yugoslav volleyball championship.
During the next two seasons, Budvanska Rivijera played in the final series, but both times lost, 2002-03 against Crvena Zvezda (0-3 in series) and 2003-04 against Vojvodina (0-3 in series).
On season 2004-05, Budućnost won their second title of national champion. In the final series, they dominated against Vojvodina (3-0 in series). Team from Podgorica defended the trophy on season 2005-06. Once again, their opponent in the playoff final was Vojvodina (3-2 in series).
From the beginning of the new century, Budućnost and Budvanska Rivijera started to play in CEV Champions League.
Below is the list of Budućnost and Budvanska Rivijera champion titles won in Yugoslavia / Serbia and Montenegro Championship.

Club	Winners	Runners-up	Winning years
OK Budućnost Podgorica	3	1	2001-02, 2004-05, 2005-06
OK Budvanska Rivijera Budva	1	3	2000-01

Except that, from the nineties, Montenegrin clubs like Elektroprivreda (Nikšić), Luka Bar (Bar), Studentski centar (Podgorica) and Pljevlja often played in the Second Yugoslav League. Lowest-tier competition was Montenegrin Republic League, which existed from 1978 to 2006.

=== After independence ===
Soon after the Montenegrin independence referendum, Volleyball Federation of Montenegro founded its own competitions, with the First League as a top-tier competition. Since founded, Montenegrin First League had various number of participants: 2006/07 - 7 clubs; 2007/08 - 8 clubs; 2008/09 - 8 clubs; 2009/10 - 8 clubs; 2010/11 - 6 clubs; 2011/12 - 8 clubs; 2012/13 - 4 clubs; 2013/14 - 8 clubs; 2014/15 - 6 clubs; 2015/16 - 6 clubs; 2016-17 - 6 clubs; 2017-18 - 6 clubs, 2018-19 - 5 clubs, 2019-20 - 5 clubs.
During the first decade of Montenegrin championship, most successful club was OK Budvanska Rivijera, who held eight consecutive trophies from season 2008-09 to 2015-06. Other club which ever won a title of Montenegrin Volleyball League in period 2006-2016 is OK Budućnost, who did it during the first two editions of the championship.
On season 2016-17, champions title gained OK Jedinstvo from Bijelo Polje, which became the first team from northern Montenegro who won the Championship. A year later, OK Jedinstvo won another title, but without OK Budvanska Rivijera in league, who was dissolved.
Edition 2017-18 is won by OK Budva, who became a successor of strong volleyball tradition in the city of Budva. In playoff finals, OK Budva won the series against OK Budućnost (3-0).
Season 2019-20 was interrupted after eight weeks, due to the coronavirus pandemic. Montenegrin volleyball federation decided that placement after the eight weeks was the final one, so OK Budva won their second trophy in the history.

== Champions ==
From the inaugural season (2006/07), four different clubs were the champions of Montenegrin Volleyball League. OK Budvanska Rivijera and OK Budva won 16 titles, while OK Budućnost, OK Jedinstvo. Below is the list of top-placed teams by every single season.

=== Titles by seasons ===
Season	Champion	Runner-up	Third	Playoffs final series
2006–07	Budućnost	Budvanska Rivijera	Jedinstvo	Budućnost - Budvanska Rivijera 3-1
2007–08	Budućnost	Budvanska Rivijera	Jedinstvo	Budućnost - Budvanska Rivijera 3-1
2008–09	Budvanska Rivijera	Budućnost	Studentski Centar	Budvanska Rivijera - Budućnost 3-1
2009–10	Budvanska Rivijera	Budućnost	Studentski Centar	Budvanska Rivijera - Budućnost 3-0
2010–11	Budvanska Rivijera	Budućnost	Studentski Centar	Budvanska Rivijera - Budućnost 3-0
2011–12	Budvanska Rivijera	Budućnost	Studentski Centar	Budvanska Rivijera - Budućnost 3-1
2012–13	Budvanska Rivijera	Budućnost	Jedinstvo	Budvanska Rivijera - Budućnost 3-0
2013–14	Budvanska Rivijera	Budućnost	Volley Star	Budvanska Rivijera - Budućnost 3-0
2014–15	Budvanska Rivijera	Budućnost	Volley Star	Budvanska Rivijera - Budućnost 3-0
2015–16	Budvanska Rivijera	Jedinstvo	Budućnost	Budvanska Rivijera - Jedinstvo 3-0
2016–17	Jedinstvo	Budvanska Rivijera	Budućnost	Jedinstvo - Budvanska Rivijera 3-0
2017–18	Jedinstvo	Budućnost	Bar Volley	Jedinstvo - Budućnost 3-0
2018–19	Budva	Budućnost	Jedinstvo	Budva - Budućnost 3-0
2019–20	Canceled due to the COVID-19 pandemic – no champion announced			
2020–21	Budva	Budućnost	Mornar	Budva - Budućnost 3-1
2021–22	Budva	Budućnost	Galeb	Budva - Budućnost 3-0
2022–23	Budva	Budućnost	Mornar	Budva - Budućnost 3-1
2023–24	Budva	Budućnost	Jedinstvo	Budva - Budućnost 3-1
2024–25	Budva	Budućnost	Mornar	Budva - Budućnost 3-1
2025–26	Budva	Budućnost	Jedinstvo	Budva - Budućnost 3-2

=== Titles by team ===
==== Montenegrin League ====
Below is a list of clubs with titles won in Montenegrin Volleyball League.

Club	Winners	Runners-up	Winning years
OK Budva	16	2	2008–09, 2009-10, 2010-11, 2011-12, 2012–13, 2013–14, 2014–15, 2015–16, 2018-19, 2020-21, 2021-22, 2022-23, 2023-24, 2024-25, 2025-26
Budućnost Podgorica	2	10	2006–07, 2007–08
Jedinstvo Bijelo Polje	2	2	2016-17, 2017-18

==== Overall ====
Below is an overall list, with titles won in both leagues - Montenegrin Volleyball League and FR Yugoslavia / Serbia and Montenegro Championship.

Club	Winners	Runners-up	Winning years
Budvanska Rivijera Budva	9	5	2000-01, 2008–09, 2009-10, 2010-11, 2011-12, 2012–13, 2013–14, 2014–15, 2015–16
Budućnost Podgorica	5	11	2001-02, 2004-05, 2005-06, 2006–07, 2007–08
Budva	3	-	2018-19, 2019-20, 2020-21
Jedinstvo Bijelo Polje	2	2	2016-17, 2017-18

== Participants ==
=== All-time participants (2006-) ===
Since foundation, in Montenegrin Volleyball League participated 15 different clubs. OK Budućnost and OK Jedinstvo are the only two teams which participated in every single season. Below is a list of participants with number of seasons in the competition.

Club	Town	Ssn	First	Last
Budućnost	Podgorica	15	2006-07	2020-21
Jedinstvo	Bijelo Polje	15	2006-07	2020-21
Sutjeska	Nikšić	14	2006-07	2020-21
Budvanska Rivijera	Budva	11	2006-07	2016-17
Mornar	Bar	9	2011-12	2020-21
Budva	Budva	7	2006-07	2020-21
Volley Star	Nikšić	7	2011-12	2018-19
Studentski Centar	Podgorica	6	2006-07	2011-12
Luka Bar	Bar	3	2006-07	2008-09
Galeb	Bar	3	2009-10	2020-21
Nik Volley	Nikšić	1	2007-08	2007-08
Pljevlja	Pljevlja	1	2008-09	2008-09
Danilovgrad	Danilovgrad	1	2009-10	2009-10
Ibar	Rožaje	1	2011-12	2011-12
Mediteran	Budva	1	2011-12	2020-21

=== Current teams ===
Montenegrin Volleyball League 2019-20 have five participants. Below is the list of clubs in current season.

First Montenegrin Volleyball League
Team	City	Est	Arena	Capacity	Colours
Budva	Budva	1978	Mediterranean	1,500	
Budućnost	Podgorica	1936	Morača	4,570	
Jedinstvo	Bijelo Polje	1950	Nikoljac	2,700	
Sutjeska	Nikšić	1978	SC Nikšić	3,000	
Mornar	Bar	2014	Topolica SC	2,625	

== Montenegrin clubs in European volleyball competitions ==
Montenegrin volleyball clubs are participating in the CEV competitions since the season 1995-96.
First team which ever competed at the European cups was OK Budućnost Podgorica. Except them, in CEV competitions played also OK Budvanska Rivijera Budva, OK Sutjeska Nikšić, OK Jedinstvo Bijelo Polje and OK Studentski Centar Podgorica.
Among other competitions, OK Budućnost and OK Budvanska Rivijera played a numerous seasons in CEV Champions League, with few participations in the final phases of competition.
During the overall history, five different Montenegrin clubs played in CEV competitions.

Team	Seasons	G	W	L
OK Budvanska Rivijera Budva	16	94	42	52
OK Budućnost Podgorica	12	59	29	30
OK Jedinstvo Bijelo Polje	4	12	4	8
OK Sutjeska Nikšić	2	4	0	4
OK Studentski Centar Podgorica	2	4	0	4
OK Budva	1	4	2	2

As of the end of CEV competitions 2019–20 season.

== See also ==
- Montenegrin volleyball Cup
- Volleyball Federation of Montenegro (OSCG)
- Montenegrin women's volley league
