= Montenegrin Women's Volleyball Cup =

Volleyball in the Montenegro

- Countries: Montenegro
- Federation: Volleyball Federation of Montenegro
- Founded: 2006
- Domestic championship: Montenegrin women's volley league
- Current winner: Galeb
- Most titles: Luka Bar (7)

The Montenegrin women's volleyball Cup (Montenegrin: Crnogorski kup za odbojkašice) is the national volleyball cup for women teams played in Montenegro. Inaugural season of Cup is held on season 2006–07, after the independence of Montenegro.

== History ==
=== Before independence ===
Before 2006, Montenegrin Cup was a republic competition in FR Yugoslavia women's volleyball system. First season of Montenegrin Republic Cup was organized on season 1994–95. Winner of Republic Cup gained participation in the Federal Cup of FR Yugoslavia.
Most successful was Luka Bar, which participated twice in the final match of FR Yugoslavia Cup. First time, 1997–98, Luka Bar is defeated in the finals against Jedinstvo Užice in Belgrade (1:3). In their second final (2002–03), Luka Bar again met Jedinstvo, this time in Užice, and defeated 0:3.
In the period 1995–2006, winners of Republic Cup by seasons were: 1994-95 - Luka Bar, 1995-96 - Luka Bar, 1996-97 - Luka Bar, 1997-98 - Rudar Pljevlja, 1998-99 - Luka Bar, 1999-00 - Rudar Pljevlja, 2000-01 - Rudar Pljevlja, 2001-02 - Budućnost Podgorica, 2002-03 - Podgorica, 2003-04 - Rudar Pljevlja, 2004-05 - Budućnost Podgorica, 2005-06 - Podgorica.

=== After independence ===
Nearly after the Montenegrin independence referendum, Volleyball Federation of Montenegro founded its own national competitions. Women teams started playing in First League and Second League, and during the end of 2006 started the first season of Montenegrin Cup.
Cup Competition have two main phases. First are Round of 16 and quarterfinals, while second is final-four.

== Winners and finals ==
=== Season by season ===
Since 2006–07 season, Montenegrin women's volleyball Cup is playing as a national competition, and in the finals so far played following teams.

Season	Winner	Score	Runners-up
2006–07	Luka Bar	3–0	Podgorica
2007–08	Rudar Pljevlja	3–2	Luka Bar
2008–09	Rudar Pljevlja	3–0	Luka Bar
2009–10	Galeb Bar	3–1	Luka Bar
2010–11	Luka Bar	3–2	Galeb Bar
2011–12	Luka Bar	3–0	Budućnost Podgorica
2012–13	Luka Bar	3–2	Morača Podgorica
2013–14	Luka Bar	3–0	Budućnost Podgorica
2014–15	Luka Bar	3–1	Galeb Bar
2015–16	Galeb Bar	3–0	Morača Podgorica
2016–17	Luka Bar	3–2	Galeb Bar
2017–18	Galeb Bar	3–1	Luka Bar
2018–19	Galeb Bar	3–2	Luka Bar
2019–20	Galeb Bar	3–2	Morača Podgorica
2020–21	Galeb Bar	3–1	Luka Bar
2021–22	Galeb Bar	3–0	Luka Bar
2022–23	Herceg Novi	3–0	Albatros

=== Trophies by team ===
Three clubs have won the trophy. The most successful is ŽOK Luka Bar, with 6 Cup-winner titles.

Club	Winners	Runners-up	Winning years
ŽOK Luka Bar	7	7	2006–07, 2010–11, 2011–12, 2012–13, 2013–14, 2014–15, 2016–17
ŽOK Galeb Bar	7	3	2009–10, 2015–16, 2017–18, 2018–19, 2019–20, 2020–21, 2021-22
AOK Rudar Pljevlja	2	-	2007–08, 2008–09
ŽOK Herceg Novi	1	-	2022–23
ŽOK Morača Podgorica	-	3	
ŽOK Budućnost Podgorica	-	2	
ŽOK Podgorica	-	1	
ŽOK Albatros	-	1	

Luka Bar, also, participated in the two finals of FR Yugoslavia Cup (not counted in the previous list).

== See also ==
- Montenegrin women's volley league
- Volleyball Federation of Montenegro (OSCG)
- Montenegro women's national volleyball team
- Montenegrin men's volleyball Cup
