= Montenegrin volleyball Cup =

Volleyball competition in Montenegro

Montenegrin Volleyball Cup
- Countries: Montenegro
- Federation: Volleyball Federation of Montenegro
- Founded: 2006
- Domestic championship: Montenegrin Volleyball League
- Current winner: Jedinstvo (3rd title)
- Most titles: Budvanska Rivijera (7 titles in independent Montenegro; 9 overall)

The Montenegrin volleyball Cup (Montenegrin: Kup Crne Gore u odbojci) is the national volleyball cup for men teams played in Montenegro. Inaugural season of Cup is held on season 2006–07, after the independence of Montenegro.

== History ==
=== Montenegrin clubs in Yugoslav Cup ===
Before Montenegrin independence, clubs from that Republic played in the national volleyball Cup of Yugoslavia / Serbia and Montenegro. Most successful participants were Budvanska Rivijera and Budućnost Podgorica with three trophies won.
First significant success of Montenegrin teams in Yugoslav Cup came on season 1997–98, as Budvanska Rivijera participated in the final-four, but eliminated against Vojvodina (0-3) in semifinals. Next year, Budućnost played on final-four. After the semifinal victory against Smederevo (3-2), Budućnost was defeated in the finals - their rival was Crvena Zvezda (2-3).
Budućnost became first Montenegrin winner of Yugoslav Cup on season 1999–2000. In semifinals, they eliminated another Montenegrin side - Budvanska Rivijera (3-1), and in the finals they defeated Partizan (3-2). Next year, another Montenegrin team won the trophy - Budvanska Rivijera won the semifinals against Itison Ivanjica (3-2) and after that a final game against Vojvodina (3-1).
Season 2001-02 finished with the first ever final match between two Montenegrin teams. Budvanska Rivijera in semifinals eliminated Partizan (3-0), while Budućnost was better than Vojvodina (3-2). Final game won Budvanska Rivijera - 3:0.
That was the last season when one Montenegrin team won Yugoslav Cup. On season 2003–04, Budvanska Rivijera lost the final game against Vojvodina (2-3), and during the next year's finals - Budućnost was defeated by Vojvodina (0-3). Below is a list of Yugoslav Cup trophies won by Montenegrin clubs.

Club	Winners	Runners-up	Winning years
OK Budvanska Rivijera Budva	2	1	2000-01, 2001-02
OK Budućnost Podgorica	1	3	1999-00

=== Montenegrin Cup (2006-) ===
Except Montenegrin Volleyball League as a top-tier league competition, after the independence, Volleyball Federation of Montenegro established Montenegrin Cup as a national tournament.
First three editions of Montenegrin Cup were won by Budućnost, every time against Budvanska Rivijera. From season 2009-10, started the domination of Budvanska Rivijera, who won seven consecutive Cup trophies, with only one set lost in seven final matches. The list with the two-team trophy holders changed on season 2016-17, as Jedinstvo surprisingly won the final match against Budvanska Rivijera (3-1). Same team won the Montenegrin Cup on season 2017-18. From 2018-19 edition, just like in the championship, begun the domination of OK Budva, who won three trophies in a row.

== Winners and finals ==
=== Season by season ===
Season	Winner	Score	Runners-up
2006–07	Budućnost	3–2	Budvanska Rivijera
2007–08	Budućnost	3–1	Budvanska Rivijera
2008–09	Budućnost	3–1	Budvanska Rivijera
2009–10	Budvanska Rivijera	3–0	Budućnost
2010–11	Budvanska Rivijera	3–0	Budućnost
2011–12	Budvanska Rivijera	3–1	Budućnost
2012–13	Budvanska Rivijera	3–0	Budućnost
2013–14	Budvanska Rivijera	3–0	Budućnost
2014–15	Budvanska Rivijera	3–0	Volley Star
2015–16	Budvanska Rivijera	3–0	Jedinstvo
2016–17	Jedinstvo	3–1	Budvanska Rivijera
2017–18	Jedinstvo	3–0	Budućnost
2018–19	Budva	3–0	Jedinstvo
2019–20	Budva	3–0	Jedinstvo
2020–21	Budva	3–0	Budućnost
2021–22	Budva	3–2	Budućnost
2022–23	Budva	3–0	Budućnost
2023–24	Budva	3–0	Jedinstvo

=== Trophies by team ===
==== Montenegrin Cup ====
Below is a list of clubs with trophies won in Montenegrin Cup (2006-).

Club	Winners	Runners-up	Winning years
Budvanska Rivijera Budva	7	4	2009–10, 2010–11, 2011–12, 2012–13, 2013–14, 2014–15, 2015-16
Budva	6	-	2018-19, 2019-20, 2020-21, 2021-22, 2022-23, 2023-24
Budućnost Podgorica	3	10	2006-07, 2007–08, 2008-09
Jedinstvo Bijelo Polje	2	4	2016-17, 2017-18
Volley Star Nikšić	-	1	

==== Overall ====
Below is an overall list, including titles won in both national Cups - Montenegrin Cup and FR Yugoslavia / Serbia and Montenegro Cup.

Club	Winners	Runners-up	Winning years
Budvanska Rivijera Budva	9	4	2000–01, 2001–02, 2009–10, 2010–11, 2011–12, 2012–13, 2013–14, 2014–15, 2015–16
Budva	6	-	2018–19, 2019–20, 2020–21, 2021–22, 2022–23, 2023–24
Budućnost Podgorica	4	13	1999–00, 2006–07, 2007–08, 2008–09
Jedinstvo Bijelo Polje	2	4	2016–17, 2017–18
Volley Star Nikšić	-	1	

== See also ==
- Montenegrin Volleyball League
- Volleyball Federation of Montenegro (OSCG)
- Montenegrin women's volleyball Cup
