= OK Budućnost Podgorica =

Montenegrin volleyball team

OK Budućnost Podgorica, also known by the sponsorship name of Budućnost Podgorička banka, is a volleyball club from Podgorica, Montenegro.

It is considered the most successful volleyball club from Montenegro. It plays its home games at Morača Sports Center.

The team participates in the Men's CEV Champions League 2007-08.

OK Budućnost is a part of Budućnost Podgorica sports society.

== Previous names ==
- ....-Present : Budućnost Podgorička Banka

== Squad ==
- (Montenegro) Dušan Medojević
- (Montenegro) Ivan Bošković
- (Montenegro) Marko Vukašinović
- (Montenegro) Luka Babić
- (Montenegro) Andrej Bojić
- (Montenegro) Nikola Kažić
- (Montenegro) Bojan Đukić
- (Montenegro) Slobodan Bojić
- (Montenegro) Marko Đuranović
- (Montenegro) Ivan Rašović
- (Montenegro) Boris Vlahović
- (Montenegro) Bojan Radović
- (Montenegro) Petar Gošović

== Notable former players ==
- (Socialist Federal Republic of Yugoslavia) Milan Đurić
- (Montenegro) Miloš Ćulafić
- (Montenegro) Marko Bojić
- (Montenegro) Aleksandar Milivojević
