= Volleyball Federation of Montenegro =

Governing body of volleyball in Montenegro

Volleyball Federation of Montenegro Odbojkaški savez Crne Gore
- Formation: 1949
- Headquarters: Podgorica
- Location: Montenegro
- President: Nikola Kažić
- Key people: Ivan Bošković (Secretary General)
- Website: www.oscg.me

The Volleyball Federation of Montenegro (OSCG) (Montenegrin: Odbojkaški savez Crne Gore) is the governing body of volleyball in Montenegro. It is based in Podgorica.

It organizes the volleyball leagues:

- Montenegrin women's volley league
- Montenegrin men volleyball league
- Montenegrin women's second volleyball League
- Montenegrin Cup / women
- Montenegrin Cup / men

It also organizes the Montenegrin national volleyball team and the Montenegro national women's volleyball team.

The biggest result is winning title in European League 2014, after beating Greece in final. After that, Montenegro team qualified for first ever appearance in FIVB World League 2015.

Men National Team of Montenegro competed in FIVB World League 2015 for the first time in their history. They played in 3rd group in pool F with Turkey, Tunis and Puerto Rico. Montenegro finished first in group and proceed to final tournament in Slovakia. In semifinal Montenegro beat China 3:1, and in final lost after thrilling match 3:2 from Egypt.

OSCG was formed in 1958. It has been a member of the Fédération Internationale de Volleyball and the Confédération Européenne de Volleyball since independence in 2006.

== See also ==
- Montenegro women's national volleyball team
- Montenegro men's national volleyball team
- Montenegrin women's volley league
- Montenegrin men's volleyball League
- Montenegrin women's volleyball Cup
- Montenegrin men's volleyball Cup
