= OK Budvanska Rivijera =

Budvanska Rivijera Budva
- Full name: OK Budvanska Rivijera Budva
- Founded: 1978
- Dissolved: 2017
- Ground: Mediterranean SC, Budva, Montenegro (Capacity: 1,500)

OK Budvanska Rivijera Budva was a professional volleyball team based in Budva, Montenegro, founded in 1978. It played in the Montenegrin Volleyball League. The club was dissolved in 2017.

== History ==
The club was founded in 1978 as Avala Budva and took part in the 1982 regional championship of the Republic of Montenegro. From 1982 the team played in the second division of the SFR Yugoslavia. In 1991–92 the team finished in third place in the playoffs of the second division, but was still promoted due to the dissolution of the team Jugoslavija in the first division. Because of the disintegration of SFR Yugoslavia, the volleyball league was also reorganized and Avala was relegated to the B Division of the Federal Republic of Yugoslavia.

== Honours ==
- Yugoslav Volleyball League

2000–01

- Yugoslav Volleyball Cup

2000–01, 2001–02

- Montenegrin Volleyball League

2008–09, 2009–10, 2010–11, 2011–12, 2012–13, 2013–14, 2014–15, 2015–16

- Montenegrin Volleyball Cup

2010, 2011, 2012, 2013, 2014, 2015, 2016
