= 2007 Men's European Volleyball Championship squads =

This article shows all participating team squads at the 2007 Men's European Volleyball Championship, held in Saint Petersburg and Moscow, Russia from September 6 to September 16, 2007.

== Belgium ==
- Head Coach: Claudio Gewehr

#	Name	Date of birth	Weight	Height	Spike	Block
1	Kristof Hoho	07.08.1980	94	196	340	334
2	Arne Poelman	30.04.1988	98	211	338	323
3	Jo Van Decraen	27.04.1982	97	210	346	334
4	Christof Van Goethem	20.08.1979	95	193	340	328
5	Frank Depestele	03.09.1977	93	191	327	320
6	Jimmy Prenen	31.03.1984	87	196	342	332
9	Manuel Callebert	07.07.1977	85	181	323	316
10	Wouter Verhelst	20.07.1980	83	196	340	330
11	Matthijs Verhanneman	08.12.1988	96	198	344	320
12	Gert Van Walle	07.08.1987	85	199	347	328
15	Christophe Van De Plas	10.12.1980	78	193	330	320
17	Michel Haesevoets	14.09.1979	79	194	330	325

== Bulgaria ==
- Head Coach: Martin Stoev

#	Name	Date of birth	Weight	Height	Spike	Block
1	Evgeni Ivanov	03.06.1974	99	210	351	340
3	Andrey Zhekov	12.03.1980	82	190	340	263
5	Krasimir Gaydarski	23.02.1983	96	204	350	330
6	Matey Kaziyski	23.09.1984	93	202	370	335
7	Nikolai Nikolov	29.07.1986	85	203	344	330
8	Ivan Stanev	07.07.1985	92	190	335	315
9	Metodi Ananiev	17.02.1986	100	202	340	330
10	Danail Milushev	03.02.1984	93	200	358	335
11	Boyan Yordanov	12.03.1983	86	197	358	335
13	Teodor Salparov	06.08.1982	73	185	320	305
14	Kostadin Stoykov	07.12.1977	85	199	349	329
17	Plamen Konstantinov	14.06.1973	93	202	347	330

== Croatia ==
- Head Coach: Radovan Malević

#	Name	Date of birth	Weight	Height	Spike	Block
1	Tsimafei Zhukouski	18.12.1989	66	192	315	305
4	Darko Nojić	06.03.1984	83	191	330	310
5	Igor Omrčen	26.09.1980	102	208	362	346
6	Ivan Raic	03.06.1989	88	202	347	336
7	Ivan Ćosić	21.02.1984	96	202	342	330
8	Zeljko Nojić	30.09.1980	80	182	336	324
9	Dragan Puljić	17.09.1984	94	207	350	332
10	Mario Zelić	18.07.1981	94	202	340	328
11	Toni Kovačević	15.01.1983	94	198	346	322
12	Tomislav Čošković	22.04.1979	92	200	356	331
14	Inoslav Krnić	14.01.1979	90	190	335	317
15	Roko Sikirić	22.08.1981	88	196	334	318

== Finland ==
- Head Coach: Mauro Berruto

#	Name	Date of birth	Weight	Height	Spike	Block
1	Tapio Kangasniemi	07.03.1979	88	186	337	300
3	Mikko Esko	03.09.1978	88	198	348	318
5	Antti Siltala	14.03.1984	90	193	346	320
6	Tuomas Sammelvuo	16.02.1976	91	193	348	320
7	Matti Hietanen	03.01.1983	94	199	350	318
8	Simo-Pekka Olli	13.11.1985	98	203	350	326
11	Janne Heikkinen	11.04.1976	105	202	360	330
12	Olli Kunnari	02.02.1982	85	196	344	320
13	Mikko Oivanen	26.05.1986	91	198	360	326
14	Konstantin Shumov	15.02.1985	101	205	352	328
15	Matti Oivanen	26.05.1986	91	198	355	326
16	Urpo Sivula	15.03.1988	96	194	350	326

== France ==
- Head Coach: Philippe Blain

#	Name	Date of birth	Height	Weight	Spike	Block
1	Xavier Kapfer	07.11.1981	96	191	354	320
2	Bojidar Slavev	30.06.1984	95	203	348	325
3	Gérald Hardy-Dessources	09.02.1983	93	197	360	335
4	Antonin Rouzier	18.08.1986	97	201	350	330
5	Romain Vadeleux	12.02.1983	96	200	351	313
7	Stéphane Antiga	03.02.1976	94	200	344	321
8	Ludovic Castard	18.01.1983	85	195	344	321
10	Vincent Montméat	01.09.1977	88	196	348	330
11	Loïc Le Marrec	01.03.1977	82	190	330	312
12	Hubert Henno	06.10.1976	83	188	330	310
13	Pierre Pujol	13.07.1984	90	190	335	315
15	Guillaume Samica	28.09.1981	84	198	343	318

== Germany ==
- Head Coach: Stelian Moculescu

#	Name	Date of birth	Weight	Height	Spike	Block
1	Marcus Popp	23.09.1981	83	192	344	328
2	Markus Steuerwald	07.03.1989	72	183	322	304
4	Simon Tischer	24.04.1982	88	194	345	328
5	Björn Andrae	14.05.1981	90	200	355	335
9	Stefan Hübner	13.06.1975	89	200	365	345
10	Jochen Schöps	08.10.1983	99	200	360	338
11	Frank Dehne	14.02.1976	93	202	343	325
12	Christian Pampel	06.09.1979	90	198	363	341
13	Ralph Bergmann	26.05.1970	95	206	350	327
14	Robert Kromm	09.03.1984	92	212	363	339
15	Max Günthör	09.08.1985	84	207	345	315
18	Georg Grozer	27.11.1984	99	200	370	345

== Greece ==
- Head Coach: Alexandros Leonis

#	Name	Date of birth	Weight	Height	Spike	Block
2	Marios Giourdas	02.03.1973	90	202	356	341
3	Theodoros Chatziantoniou	16.03.1974	95	204	360	350
6	Vasileios Kournetas	02.08.1976	82	191	336	320
7	Georgios Stefanou	12.01.1981	82	187	295	305
8	Konstantinos Prousalis	06.10.1980	83	192	320	295
10	Ioannis Kyriakidis	07.07.1982	91	195	340	315
12	Nikolaos Smaragdis	12.02.1982	85	202	328	315
13	Theoklitos Karipidis	16.01.1980	94	200	336	317
16	Andrej Kravárik	28.07.1971	97	204	360	350
17	Nikolaos Karagiannis	04.08.1981	80	196	330	310
18	Achilleas Papadimitriou	18.08.1980	82	185	305	295

== Italy ==
- Head Coach: Gian Paolo Montali

#	Name	Date of birth	Weight	Height	Spike	Block
1	Luigi Mastrangelo	17.08.1975	90	202	368	336
3	Giordano Mattera	29.08.1983	89	198	327	313
5	Valerio Vermiglio	01.03.1976	83	190	342	320
6	Alessandro Farina	16.05.1976	80	182	342	310
7	Alessandro Paparoni	17.08.1981	78	191	340	314
8	Alberto Cisolla	10.10.1977	86	197	367	345
9	Cristian Savani	22.02.1982	83	194	354	335
10	Luca Tencati	16.03.1979	97	200	350	330
13	Lorenzo Perazzolo	30.10.1984	92	195	349	321
14	Alessandro Fei	29.11.1978	90	204	358	336
17	Andrea Sala	27.12.1978	88	202	359	340
18	Matej Černič	13.09.1978	80	192	354	335

== Netherlands ==
- Head Coach: Peter Blangé

#	Name	Date of birth	Weight	Height	Spike	Block
1	Dirk-Jan van Gendt	18.07.1974	78	185	332	313
2	Nico Freriks	22.12.1981	85	191	327	306
4	Robert Horstink	26.12.1981	84	201	326	311
6	Christian van de Wel	10.07.1978	95	194	346	346
7	Marko Klok	14.03.1968	88	194	342	329
10	Jeroen Rauwerdink	13.09.1985	93	200	344	318
11	Jan-Willem Snippe	21.05.1986	87	200	346	322
12	Wytze Kooistra	03.06.1982	100	209	355	340
14	Jairo Hooi	13.03.1978	88	201	355	342
16	Michael Olieman	17.04.1983	97	202	350	338
17	Rob Bontje	12.05.1981	94	206	366	340
18	Jeroen Trommel	01.08.1980	90	194	340	310

== Poland ==
The following is the Polish roster in the 2007 Men's European Volleyball Championship.

Head coach:	Raúl Lozano
Assistant:	Alojzy Świderek

No.	Name	Date of birth	2007 club
1	Michał Winiarski	28 September 1983	(Italy) Itas Diatec Trentino
3	Daniel Pliński	10 December 1978	(Poland) Jastrzębski Węgiel
5	Paweł Zagumny	18 October 1977	(Poland) KS PZU AZS Olsztyn
6	Bartosz Kurek	29 August 1988	(Poland) ZAKSA Kędzierzyn-Koźle
7	Wojciech Grzyb	4 January 1981	(Poland) KS PZU AZS Olsztyn
8	Robert Prygiel	17 April 1976	(Russia) Gazprom-Ugra Surgut
9	Łukasz Żygadło	2 August 1979	(Russia) Dinamo-Yantar Kaliningrad
11	Łukasz Kadziewicz	20 September 1980	(Poland) Jastrzębski Węgiel
12	Grzegorz Szymański	12 July 1978	(Poland) Jastrzębski Węgiel
13	Sebastian Świderski	26 June 1977	(Italy) RPA-LuigiBacchi.it Perugia
15	Piotr Gacek	16 September 1978	(Poland) AZS Częstochowa
17	Michał Bąkiewicz	22 March 1981	(Poland) KS PZU AZS Olsztyn

== Russia ==
- Head Coach: Vladimir Alekno

#	Name	Date of birth	Weight	Height	Spike	Block
2	Semen Poltavskiy	08.02.1981	89	205	346	338
3	Alexander Kosarev	30.09.1977	90	200	339	328
4	Pavel Kruglov	17.09.1985	90	205	351	342
5	Pavel Abramov	23.04.1979	89	198	357	336
6	Sergey Grankin	21.01.1985	87	195	351	320
8	Sergey Tetyukhin	23.09.1975	89	197	345	338
9	Vadim Khamuttskikh	26.11.1969	85	196	342	331
10	Yury Berezhko	27.01.1984	90	193	346	338
13	Alexei Ostapenko	26.05.1986	100	208	355	340
15	Alexander Volkov	14.02.1985	94	210	355	335
16	Alexey Verbov	31.01.1982	77	185	315	310
18	Alexey Kuleshov	24.02.1979	96	206	353	344

== Serbia ==
- Head Coach: Igor Kolaković

#	Name	Date of birth	Weight	Height	Spike	Block
1	Nikola Kovačević	14.02.1983	78	193	350	340
4	Bojan Janić	11.03.1982	83	198	345	340
5	Vlado Petković	06.01.1983	97	198	325	318
6	Slobodan Boškan	15.05.1975	87	197	343	320
7	Dragan Stanković	18.10.1985	80	205	343	333
8	Marko Samardžić	22.02.1983	82	190	326	310
9	Nikola Grbić	06.09.1973	91	194	346	320
10	Miloš Nikić	31.03.1986	79	194	350	330
12	Andrija Gerić	24.01.1977	101	203	350	323
14	Ivan Miljković	13.09.1979	88	206	354	333
15	Saša Starović	19.10.1988	89	207	335	321
18	Marko Podraščanin	29.08.1987	92	204	343	326

== Slovakia ==
- Head Coach: Vladimir Pridal

#	Name	Date of birth	Weight	Height	Spike	Block
2	Michal Masny	14.08.1979	72	182	322	306
4	Martin Pipa	03.09.1974	89	186	328	308
5	Julius Sabo	21.01.1983	100	208	367	345
7	Frantisek Ogurcak	24.04.1984	83	198	344	328
8	Martin Sopko	30.01.1982	90	196	344	330
10	Martin Nemec	31.07.1984	94	198	346	323
12	Andrej Barbierik	13.07.1978	100	198	348	340
13	Michal Cerven	16.12.1977	98	204	347	336
14	Tomas Kmet	01.12.1981	99	202	344	328
16	Martin Sopko	30.01.1987	87	198	343	330
17	Branislav Skladany	16.11.1983	83	184	325	309
18	Lukas Divis	20.02.1986	91	201	346	340

== Slovenia ==
- Head Coach: Iztok Ksela

#	Name	Date of birth	Weight	Height	Spike	Block
2	Matej Vidič	06.11.1986	92	209	344	335
3	Dejan Vinčič	15.09.1986	93	200	336	329
5	Rok Satler	04.04.1979	83	191	334	320
6	Jernej Potočnik	26.10.1981	92	196	340	319
7	Davor Čebron	25.01.1981	98	198	343	328
9	Matija Pleško	03.03.1976	83	185	340	320
12	Sebastijan Škorc	12.02.1974	70	180	320	314
14	Tine Urnaut	03.09.1988	85	198	344	334
15	Mitja Gasparini	26.06.1984	94	201	345	335
16	Alen Pajenk	23.04.1986	86	203	344	337
17	Alan Komel	12.03.1982	91	188	342	333
18	Andrej Flajs	11.03.1983	85	189	340	329

== Spain ==
- Head Coach: Andrea Anastasi

#	Name	Date of birth	Weight	Height	Spike	Block
1	Rafael Pascual	16.03.1970	94	194	355	330
2	Ibán Pérez	13.11.1983	89	198	350	325
3	José Luis Lobato	19.02.1977	81	186	-	-
4	Manuel Sevillano	02.07.1981	90	194	340	320
7	Guillermo Hernán	25.07.1982	68	181	335	315
10	Miguel Ángel Falasca	29.04.1973	92	195	335	315
11	Javier Subiela	22.03.1984	88	198	340	325
12	Guillermo Falasca	24.10.1977	104	200	355	330
14	José Luis Moltó	29.06.1975	95	207	360	345
16	Julián García-Torres	08.11.1980	93	202	350	325
17	Enrique de la Fuente	11.08.1975	95	195	345	325
18	Israel Rodríguez	27.08.1981	95	195	360	340

== Turkey ==
- Head Coach: Işık Menkuer

#	Name	Date of birth	Weight	Height	Spike	Block
1	Selçuk Keskin	15.01.1982	89	193	325	320
3	Ahmet Toçoğlu	13.03.1980	90	201	330	335
5	Nuri Şahin	01.01.1980	88	198	320	325
6	Barış Özdemir	25.06.1972	80	197	341	328
7	Sinan Cem Tanık	19.06.1980	96	197	341	328
8	Volkan Güç	16.07.1980	100	202	345	332
9	Özkan Hayırlı	27.05.1984	90	200	340	325
10	Gökhan Öner	06.09.1972	81	193	348	337
13	Kıvanç Elgaz	01.01.1986	90	202	335	330
14	Can Ayvazoğlu	14.09.1979	87	190	350	338
15	Fatih Ulusoy	09.04.1980	98	208	354	342
16	Ulaş Kıyak	11.08.1981	76	187	310	300
