= Ćosić =

- Language: Bosnian, Croatian and Serbian

Origin
- Language: Turkish
- Derivation: Köse
- Meaning: beardless

Ćosić is a Bosnian, Croatian and Serbian surname. It may refer to:

- Aleksandar Ćosić (1922-?), Yugoslav sprinter
- Bora Ćosić (born 1932), Yugoslav writer
- Božidar Ćosić (born 1982), Serbian professional footballer
- Dobrica Ćosić (1921–2014), Serbian politician, writer
- Drago Ćosić (born 1958), Croatian television journalist
- Ivan Ćosić (footballer) (born 1989), Croatian-German footballer
- Ivan Ćosić (volleyball) (born 1984), Croatian volleyball player
- Ivan Ćosić (handballer) (born 1986), Croatian handball player
- Krešimir Ćosić (1948–1995), Croatian basketball player
  - Krešimir Ćosić Cup, the national basketball cup of Croatia
  - Krešimir Ćosić Hall, multi-use indoor arena in Zadar, Croatia
- Krešimir Ćosić (born 1949), Croatian soldier and politician
- Ljubiša Ćosić (born 1979), Bosnian Serb politician
- Marko Ćosić (born 1994), Croatian footballer
- Miro Ćosić (born 1983), Bosnian biathlete
- Sarah Ćosić (born 1989), Croatian model
- Uroš Ćosić (born 1992), Serbian footballer
- Vuk Ćosić (born 1966), Serbian computer artist
- Zlatko Ćosić (born 1972), Bosnia and Herzegovina experimental filmmaker and video artist
- Zoran Ćosić (born 1963), Bosnian biathlete
- Ingrid Ćosić (born 2007), Croatian tennis player

== See also ==
- Köse
