= Kaan Gürbüz =

Turkish volleyball player (born 2001)

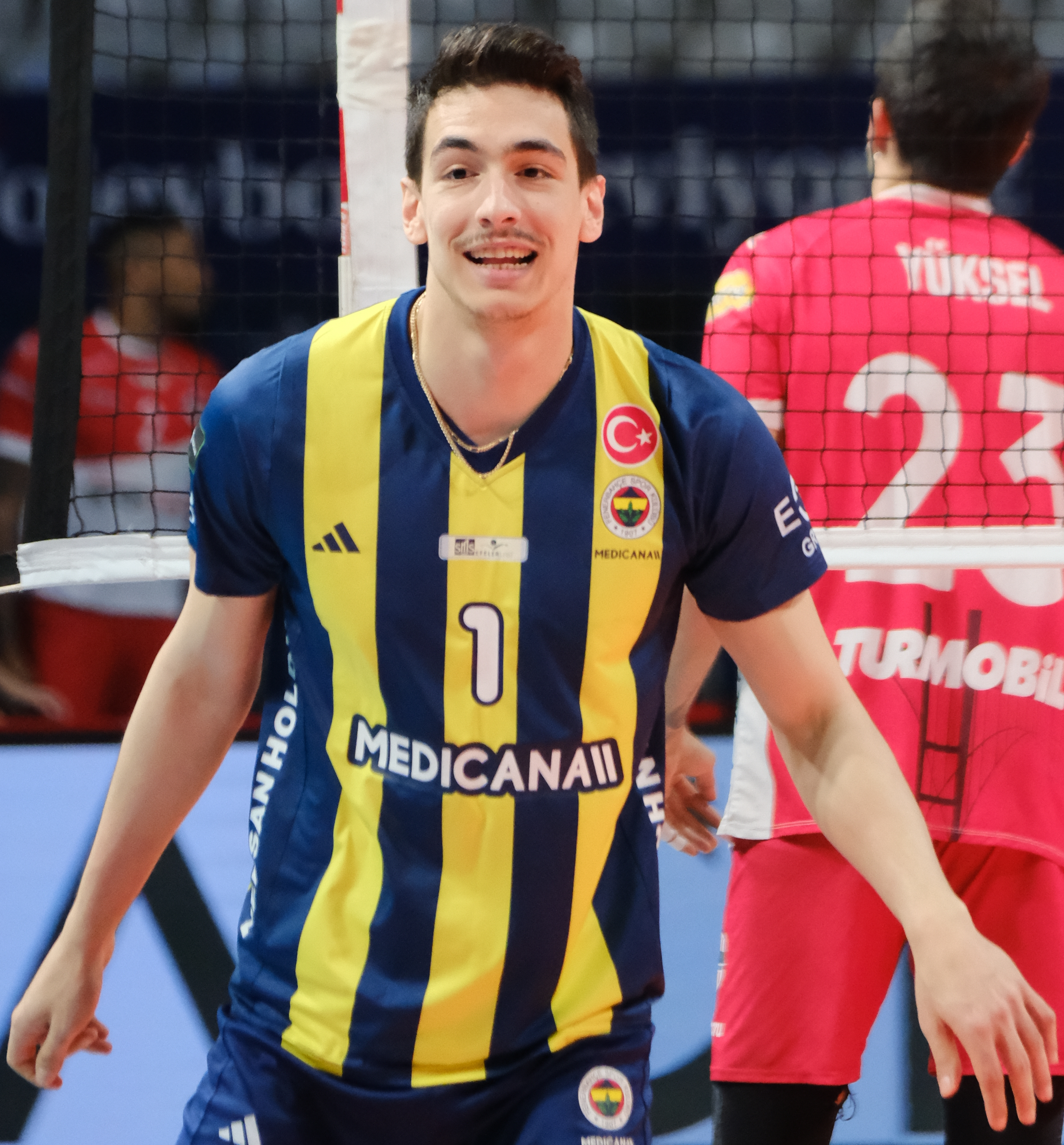

Personal information
- Nationality: (Turkey) Turkish
- Born: 16 August 2001 (age 25); Istanbul, Turkey
- Height: 1.99 m (6 ft 6 in)
- Weight: 79 kg (174 lb)
- Spike: 342 cm (135 in)
- Block: 330 cm (130 in)

Volleyball information
- Position: Outside hitter
- Current club: Fenerbahçe
- Number: 1

Career
Years
- 2015–2019
- 2019–2021
- 2021–
Teams
- TVF Spor Lisesi
- TFL Altekma
- Fenerbahçe

National team
2021–	Turkey
Honours
Men's volleyball
Representing Turkey
Challenger Cup
Gold medal – first place	2023 Qatar	Team
European Golden League
Gold medal – first place	2021 Belgium	Team
Silver medal – second place	2022 Croatia	Team
Gold medal – first place	2023 Croatia	Team
Islamic Solidarity Games
Bronze medal – third place	2021 Turkey	Team

Kaan Gürbüz (born 16 August 2001) is a Turkish international volleyball player. He is left handed and plays as outside hitter for Fenerbahçe of the AXA Sigorta Efeler Ligi and the CEV Champions League.

== Career ==
Born in 2001, the young outside hitter started playing volleyball at Fabrika Voleybol at a young age. He then played at TVF Spor Lisesi in 2015, played there for 4 years. He also succeeded in wearing the A Team jersey in the 1st League.

Kaan, who started playing in the 1st League team TFL Altekma in the 2019-2020 season, had a share in TFL Altekma's promotion to the Efeler League. He had a successful season at TFL Altekma in the 2020-2021 season.

On 2 August 2021, he joined Fenerbahçe. On 1 February 2025, he scored 44 points against Galatasaray HDI Sigorta in league derby match, which they won 3-2 in away game.

== National team ==
He wore the national jersey in the junior age categories, won the Balkan Championship with the Junior National Team in 2016. Gürbüz, who came third in the 2017 U17 Men's Balkan Championship and won the championship in the 2018 U18 and 2019 U19 Men's Balkan Championships, won the Best Outside Hitter award in these 3 years. Kaan Gürbüz, who finished third in the 2017 CEV U17 European Championship, won the MVP award with his performance.

He wore the A National Team jersey for the first time in 2021, experienced Championship success with the National Team in the 2021 CEV European League.

On 13 August 2021, he scored 41 points against Iran in 2021 Islamic Solidarity Games group match, which they won 3-2 then qualified to the semi final.

== Awards ==
=== Club ===
TFL Altekma

- Turkish 1st League - 2019–20

Fenerbahçe

- CEV Cup - 2023–24
- Turkish League - 2023–24 2021–22, 2022–23
- Turkish Cup - 2024–25 2022–23 2023–24

=== National team ===
- Challenger Cup: 2023
- European Golden League: 2021, 2023 2022
- Islamic Solidarity Games: 2021

=== Individual ===
- 2016 U16 Men's Balkan Championship - "Best Outside Hitter"
- 2017 U17 Men's Balkan Championship - "Best Outside Hitter"
- 2019 U19 Men's Balkan Championship - "Best Outside Hitter"
- 2017 CEV U17 European Championship - "MVP"
- 2021 Islamic Solidarity Games - "Best Outside Hitter"
- 2021 Islamic Solidarity Games - "Best Scorer"
- 2023 European Volleyball League - "MVP"

Awards
Preceded by (Czech Republic) Jan Galabov	MVP of European Golden League; 2023	Succeeded by (Ukraine) Yevhenii Kisiliuk
