= 2004 Men's European Volleyball League =

Tournament details
- Host country: Czech Republic
- Dates: May 21 – June 27 (qualification); July 10/11 (final four)
- Teams: 8
- Venue: 1 (in 1 host city)

Final positions
- Champions: Czech Republic (1st title)

Tournament awards
- MVP: (Czech Republic) Petr Pláteník

The 2004 Men's European Volleyball League was the first edition of the European Volleyball League, organised by Europe's governing volleyball body, the CEV. The final Four was held in Opava, Czech Republic from 10 to 11 July 2004.

== Competing nations ==
- Croatia
- Czech Republic
- Finland
- Germany
- Netherlands
- Russia
- Slovakia
- Turkey

== League round ==
=== Pool 1 ===
Pos	Team	Pld	W	L	Pts	SW	SL	SR	SPW	SPL	SPR	Qualification
1	Russia	12	7	5	19	27	20	1.350	1059	1000	1.059	Final Four
2	Czech Republic	12	7	5	19	28	22	1.273	1105	1074	1.029	Final Four
3	Turkey	12	7	5	19	25	24	1.042	1090	1097	0.994	
4	Croatia	12	3	9	15	18	32	0.563	1050	1133	0.927	

==== Leg 1 ====
Date	Time		Score		Set 1	Set 2	Set 3	Set 4	Set 5	Total	Report
21 May	19:00	Russia	1–3	Czech Republic	22–25	22–25	25–20	23–25		92–95	Report
22 May	19:00	Russia	3–0	Czech Republic	25–18	25–19	25–20			75–57	Report
22 May	20:00	Croatia	1–3	Turkey	25–17	16–25	21–20	18–25		80–87	Report
23 May	12:00	Croatia	3–1	Turkey	25–15	22–25	25–22	25–18		97–80	Report

==== Leg 2 ====
Date	Time		Score		Set 1	Set 2	Set 3	Set 4	Set 5	Total	Report
29 May	17:30	Czech Republic	3–0	Turkey	25–22	25–21	25–23			75–66	Report
30 May	14:35	Czech Republic	2–3	Turkey	25–23	25–17	21–25	19–25	10–15	100–105	Report
29 May	17:00	Russia	3–2	Croatia	25–21	25–21	26–28	19–25	15–10	110–105	Report
30 May	17:00	Russia	3–0	Croatia	25–16	25–18	25–18			75–52	Report

==== Leg 3 ====
Date	Time		Score		Set 1	Set 2	Set 3	Set 4	Set 5	Total	Report
5 Jun	19:00	Croatia	2–3	Czech Republic	22–25	25–23	13–25	25–22	13–15	98–110	Report
6 Jun	13:00	Croatia	3–2	Czech Republic	25–20	25–22	19–25	21–25	15–12	105–104	Report
5 Jun	13:30	Turkey	3–1	Russia	27–29	25–20	25–16	25–22		102–87	Report
6 Jun	13:30	Turkey	2–3	Russia	19–25	25–20	26–24	17–25	9–15	96–109	Report

==== Leg 4 ====
Date	Time		Score		Set 1	Set 2	Set 3	Set 4	Set 5	Total	Report
12 Jun	18:00	Czech Republic	3–0	Croatia	25–21	25–22	25–18			75–61	Report
13 Jun	14:30	Czech Republic	3–2	Croatia	18–25	25–21	25–23	27–29	15–11	110–109	Report
16 Jun	18:30	Russia	3–0	Turkey	25–16	25–22	27–25			77–63	Report
17 Jun	18:30	Russia	3–1	Turkey	25–18	21–25	25–20	25–20		96–83	Report

==== Leg 5 ====
Date	Time		Score		Set 1	Set 2	Set 3	Set 4	Set 5	Total	Report
19 Jun	17:30	Turkey	3–1	Czech Republic	25–22	20–25	25–20	25–22		95–89	Report
20 Jun	17:30	Turkey	3–2	Czech Republic	25–18	26–28	19–25	22–25	15–9	107–105	Report
19 Jun	19:00	Croatia	3–2	Russia	25–21	20–25	25–22	22–25	15–11	107–104	Report
20 Jun	14:00	Croatia	0–3	Russia	14–25	18–25	20–25			52–75	Report

==== Leg 6 ====
Date	Time		Score		Set 1	Set 2	Set 3	Set 4	Set 5	Total	Report
26 Jun	18:00	Czech Republic	3–0	Russia	25–16	25–18	25–17			75–51	Report
27 Jun	14:30	Czech Republic	3–2	Russia	25–20	22–25	25–22	23–25	18–16	113–108	Report
26 Jun	13:30	Turkey	3–1	Croatia	25–27	25–23	25–21	25–21		100–92	Report
27 Jun	13:30	Turkey	3–1	Croatia	25–21	26–24	22–25	25–23		98–93	Report

=== Pool 2 ===
Pos	Team	Pld	W	L	Pts	SW	SL	SR	SPW	SPL	SPR	Qualification
1	Netherlands	12	10	2	22	34	19	1.789	1195	1112	1.075	Final Four
2	Germany	12	8	4	20	29	16	1.813	1078	970	1.111	Final Four
3	Finland	12	5	7	17	21	31	0.677	1110	1171	0.948	
4	Slovakia	12	1	11	13	17	35	0.486	1042	1172	0.889	

==== Leg 1 ====
Date	Time		Score		Set 1	Set 2	Set 3	Set 4	Set 5	Total	Report
22 May	16:00	Finland	3–2	Slovakia	25–20	25–15	25–27	20–25	15–13	110–100	Report
23 May	15:00	Finland	3–2	Slovakia	25–22	25–23	18–25	23–25	15–13	106–108	Report
20 May	20:00	Germany	1–3	Netherlands	22–25	22–25	25–23	17–25		86–98	Report
21 May	20:00	Germany	1–3	Netherlands	26–28	21–25	25–22	23–25		95–100	Report

==== Leg 2 ====
Date	Time		Score		Set 1	Set 2	Set 3	Set 4	Set 5	Total	Report
1 Jun	18:00	Slovakia	2–3	Netherlands	16–25	19–25	25–21	25–20	8–15	93–106	Report
2 Jun	18:00	Slovakia	1–3	Netherlands	22–25	25–20	20–25	20–25		87–95	Report
29 May	16:00	Finland	1–3	Germany	20–25	25–22	17–25	26–28		88–100	Report
30 May	15:00	Finland	1–3	Germany	25–16	23–25	29–31	22–25		99–97	Report

==== Leg 3 ====
Date	Time		Score		Set 1	Set 2	Set 3	Set 4	Set 5	Total	Report
5 Jun	19:00	Germany	3–0	Slovakia	25–23	25–19	25–19			75–61	Report
6 Jun	15:00	Germany	3–1	Slovakia	25–14	24–26	25–20	25–22		99–82	Report
4 Jun	19:30	Netherlands	2–3	Finland	23–25	21–25	26–24	25–17	12–15	107–106	Report
5 Jun	15:00	Netherlands	3–0	Finland	25–18	25–15	25–17			75–50	Report

==== Leg 4 ====
Date	Time		Score		Set 1	Set 2	Set 3	Set 4	Set 5	Total	Report
11 Jun	18:00	Slovakia	0–3	Germany	21–25	22–25	21–25			64–75	Report
12 Jun	18:00	Slovakia	0–3	Germany	13–25	12–25	19–25			44–75	Report
11 Jun	18:30	Finland	3–2	Netherlands	21–25	25–19	23–25	26–24	15–10	110–103	Report
12 Jun	16:00	Finland	1–3	Netherlands	19–25	27–25	23–25	18–25		87–100	Report

==== Leg 5 ====
Date	Time		Score		Set 1	Set 2	Set 3	Set 4	Set 5	Total	Report
19 Jun	14:00	Netherlands	3–2	Slovakia	25–23	13–25	25–20	22–25	15–7	100–100	Report
20 Jun	14:00	Netherlands	3–2	Slovakia	25–17	24–26	25–13	24–26	15–11	113–93	Report
19 Jun	20:15	Germany	3–0	Finland	25–20	25–20	25–17			75–57	Report
20 Jun	18:00	Germany	3–1	Finland	21–25	25–21	25–18	25–15		96–79	Report

==== Leg 6 ====
Date	Time		Score		Set 1	Set 2	Set 3	Set 4	Set 5	Total	Report
25 Jun	18:00	Slovakia	2–3	Finland	23–25	22–25	25–21	25–23	8–15	103–109	Report
26 Jun	18:00	Slovakia	3–2	Finland	25–23	25–23	19–25	23–25	15–13	107–109	Report
25 Jun	16:00	Netherlands	3–1	Germany	26–24	25–22	17–25	26–24		94–95	Report
26 Jun	14:00	Netherlands	3–2	Germany	25–23	25–23	15–25	23–25	16–14	104–110	Report

== Final four ==
Semi-finals
2004-07-10 – Opava
Czech Republic	3
Netherlands	0
2004-07-10 – Opava
Russia	3
Germany	0

Final
2004-07-11 – Opava
Czech Republic	3
Russia	1
3rd place
2004-07-11 – Opava
Netherlands	3
Germany	1

=== Semi-finals ===
Date	Time		Score		Set 1	Set 2	Set 3	Set 4	Set 5	Total	Report
10 Jul	16:30	Czech Republic	3–0	Netherlands	25–23	25–21	25–19			75–63	Report
10 Jul	19:00	Russia	3–0	Germany	25–22	25–13	25–14			75–49	Report

=== 3rd place match ===
Date	Time		Score		Set 1	Set 2	Set 3	Set 4	Set 5	Total	Report
11 Jul	14:30	Netherlands	3–1	Germany	29–31	25–18	25–19	25–23		104–91	Report

=== Final ===
Date	Time		Score		Set 1	Set 2	Set 3	Set 4	Set 5	Total	Report
11 Jul	17:00	Czech Republic	3–1	Russia	25–20	21–25	26–24	25–19		97–88	Report

== Final standing ==
Rank	Team
1st place, gold medalist(s)	Czech Republic
2nd place, silver medalist(s)	Russia
3rd place, bronze medalist(s)	Netherlands
4	Germany
5	Turkey
6	Finland
7	Croatia
8	Slovakia

2004 European League champions

Czech Republic
1st title

12-man Roster for Final Round
Kamil Baranek, Petr Habada, Ondrej Hudecek, Martin Lebl, Jakub Novotny, Marek Novotny, Petr Pláteník, Michal Rak, Lubomir Stanek, Jan Stokr, Lukas Tichacek, Petr Zapletal
Head coach

== Awards ==
- Most valuable player
  (Czech Republic) Petr Pláteník
- Best scorer
  (Croatia) Igor Omrčen
- Best spiker
  (Czech Republic) Martin Lébl
- Best blocker
  (Netherlands) Mike van de Goor
- Best server
  (Germany) Björn Andrae
