= Croatia men's national volleyball team =

National sports team

Croatia
- Association: Croatian Volleyball Federation
- Confederation: CEV
- Head coach: Ratko Peris

Uniforms
Home	Away	Third

World Championship
- Appearances: 1 (First in 2002)
- Best result: 19th (2002)

European Championship
- Appearances: 5 (First in 2005)
- Best result: 8th (2005)
- www.hos.hr (in Croatian)

Croatia men's national volleyball team
Medal record

European League
Silver medal – second place	2006 Izmir	
Silver medal – second place	2013 Marmaris	
Silver medal – second place	2024 Osijek	
Bronze medal – third place	2022 Varaždin	
Bronze medal – third place	2023 Zadar	

Mediterranean Games
Gold medal – first place	2022 Oran	Team
Bronze medal – third place	1997 Bari	Team

The Croatia men's national volleyball team represents Croatia in international volleyball competitions and friendly matches. It is governed by the Croatian Volleyball Federation.

== Results ==
Prior to 1992 Croatia men's national volleyball team competed as a part of Yugoslavia men's national volleyball team.

Competitions Croatia men's national volleyball team has never qualified for or competed at:

- the Olympic Games
- the World Cup
- the World Grand Champions Cup
- the World League
- the Junior World Championship
- the Youth Olympic Games

=== World Championship ===
Year	Round	Position
(Greece) 1994	Did not qualify	
(Japan) 1998	Did not qualify	
(Argentina) 2002	First Round	19th
(Japan) 2006	Did not qualify	
(Italy) 2010	Did not qualify	
(Poland) 2014	Did not qualify	
(Italy) (Bulgaria) 2018	Did not qualify	
(Poland) (Slovenia) 2022	Did not qualify	
(Philippines) 2025	Did not qualify	
(Poland) 2027	To be determined	
(Qatar) 2029	To be determined	

=== Challenger Cup ===
Year	Round	Position	Pld	W	L	SW	SL
(Portugal) 2018	Did not qualify						
(Slovenia) 2019	Did not qualify						
(South Korea) 2022	Did not qualify						
(Qatar) 2023	Did not qualify						
(China) 2024	Quarterfinals	5th	1	0	1	2	3
Total	Qualified: 1/5		1	0	1	2	3

=== European Championship ===
European Championship record									Qualification record				
Year	Round	Position	GP	MW	ML	SW	SL	Squad	GP	MW	ML	SW	SL
1948–1991	Part of Yugoslavia								Part of Yugoslavia				
(Finland) 1993	Did not enter								Did not enter				
(Greece) 1995	Did not enter								Did not enter				
(Netherlands) 1997	Did not qualify								8	3	5	11	17
(Austria) 1999	Did not qualify								10	7	3	23	10
(Czech Republic) 2001	Did not qualify								6	1	5	8	16
(Germany) 2003	Did not qualify								6	3	3	10	11
(Italy) (Serbia and Montenegro) 2005	Preliminary Round	8th	5	2	3	9	9	Squad	6	5	1	17	10
(Russia) 2007	Preliminary Round	14th	3	0	3	4	9	Squad	6	6	0	18	2
(Turkey) 2009	Did not qualify								Did not enter				
(Austria) (Czech Republic) 2011	Did not qualify								8	3	5	9	16
(Denmark) (Poland) 2013	Did not qualify								10	4	6	16	21
(Bulgaria) (Italy) 2015	Preliminary Round	15th	3	0	3	0	9	Squad	6	4	2	14	10
(Poland) 2017	Did not qualify								6	0	6	6	18
(France) (Slovenia) (Belgium) (Netherlands) 2019	Did not qualify								6	1	5	3	7
(Poland) (Czech Republic) (Estonia) (Finland) 2021	Round of 16	14th	6	3	3	10	14	Squad	4	3	1	10	8
(Italy) (Bulgaria) (North Macedonia) (Israel) 2023	Round of 16	11th	6	3	3	11	12	Squad	6	4	2	13	6
(Bulgaria) (Finland) (Italy) (Romania) 2026	Did not qualify								4	0	4	4	12
(Montenegro) 2028	To be determined								To be determined				
Total	Qualified: 5/17		23	8	15	34	53	—					

=== European League ===
Year	Round	Position	Pld	W	L	SW	SL
(Czech Republic) 2004	League Round	7th	12	3	9		
(Russia) 2005	did not compete						
(Turkey) 2006	Final	2nd place, silver medalist(s)	14	9	5		
(Portugal) 2007	did not compete						
(Turkey) 2008	did not compete						
(Portugal) 2009	League Round	12th	12	0	12		
(Spain) 2010	did not compete						
(Slovakia) 2011	League Round	8th	12	4	8		
(Turkey) 2012	did not compete						
(Turkey) 2013	Final	2nd place, silver medalist(s)	14	11	3		
(Montenegro) 2014	did not compete						
(Poland) 2015	League Round	9th	10	3	7		
(Bulgaria) 2016	did not compete						
(Denmark) 2017	did not compete						
(Czech Republic) 2018	Silver League Champions	13th	8	7	1		
(Estonia) 2019	Golden League League Round	8th	6	3	3		
(Belgium) 2021	Silver League Semifinals	15th	8	4	4		
(Croatia) 2022	Golden League Semifinals	3rd place, bronze medalist(s)	8	5	3		
(Croatia) 2023	Golden League Semifinals	3rd place, bronze medalist(s)	8	3	5		
(Croatia) 2024	Golden League Final	2nd place, silver medalist(s)	8	7	1		
(Czech Republic) 2025	Golden League League Round	10th	6	1	5		
(Finland) (Netherlands) 2026	League Round	15th	6	3	3		
Total	Participated: 14/22		132	63	69		
Total	Top tier (Golden League): 12/14		116	52	64		

=== Mediterranean Games ===
Year	Round	Position	Pld	W	L	SW	SL
(France) 1993	did not compete						
(Italy) 1997	Semifinals	3rd place, bronze medalist(s)					
(Tunisia) 2001	did not compete						
(Spain) 2005	Preliminary Round	9th	2	0	2	3	6
(Italy) 2009	did not compete						
(Turkey) 2013	did not compete						
(Spain) 2018	Quarterfinals	5th	5	3	2	9	11
(Algeria) 2022	Winners	1st place, gold medalist(s)	6	5	1	17	5

== Team ==
=== Current squad ===
Croatia squad for 2022 Mediterranean Games

- Bernard Bakonji
- Petar Đirlić
- Tino Hanžić
- Ivan Mihalj
- Tomislav Mitrašinović
- Kruno Nikačević
- Stipe Perić
- Hrvoje Pervan
- Marko Sedlaček
- Filip Šestan
- Petar Višić
- Ivan Zeljković

Team coached by Cédric Énard

=== Notable players ===
- Tomislav Čošković
  - best server of the 2006 European League
- Inoslav Krnić
  - best setter of the 2006 European League
- Igor Omrčen
  - top scorer of the 2004 European League
  - top scorer of the 2006 European League
- Tsimafei Zhukouski
  - best server of the 2013 European League
- Ivan Raič
  - top scorer and best spiker of the 2013 European League
- Danijel Galić
  - best receiver of the 2013 European League

=== Former squads ===
- silver medal at the 2006 European League: Tsimafei Zhukouski, Danijel Galić, Darko Nojić, Igor Omrčen, Šime Vulin, Jura Boriskijević (L), Dragan Puljić, Mario Zelić, Toni Kovačević, Tomislav Čošković, Inoslav Krnić, Roko Sikirić
  - coach: Rade Malević
- silver medal at the 2013 European League: Tsimafei Zhukouski (C), Matija Sabljak, Darko Nojić, Nikola Ščerbakov, Ivan Raič, Sven Šarčević (L), Marko Sedlaček, Ivan Ćosić, Mladen Jurčević, Fran Peterlin, Goran Išek, Ivan Tropan
  - coach: Igor Šimunčić

== Player statistics ==
Most appearances
Player	Matches	Position	Years
Igor Omrčen	83		2000–2015
Inoslav Krnić	75		
Toni Kovačević	71		
Darko Nojić	70		
Tomislav Čošković	59		–2010
Danijel Galić	55		
Tsimafei Zhukouski	53		

== Record against other teams ==
As of 13 Oct 2015

Key
Positive total balance (more wins)
Neutral total balance (equal W/L ratio)
Negative total balance (more losses)

National team	Total			Olympic Games			World Championship			World Cup			World GC Cup			World League			European Championship			European League			Mediterranean Games			Qualifications		
National team	Pld	W	L	Pld	W	L	Pld	W	L	Pld	W	L	Pld	W	L	Pld	W	L	Pld	W	L	Pld	W	L	Pld	W	L	Pld	W	L
Austria	3	2	1	0	0	0	0	0	0	0	0	0	0	0	0	0	0	0	0	0	0	0	0	0	—	—	—	3	2	1
Azerbaijan	1	1	0	0	0	0	0	0	0	0	0	0	0	0	0	0	0	0	0	0	0	0	0	0	—	—	—	1	1	0
Belarus	11	8	3	0	0	0	0	0	0	0	0	0	0	0	0	0	0	0	0	0	0	6	4	2	—	—	—	5	4	1
Belgium	9	1	8	0	0	0	0	0	0	0	0	0	0	0	0	0	0	0	0	0	0	5	0	5	—	—	—	4	1	3
Bosnia and Herzegovina	3	3	0	0	0	0	0	0	0	0	0	0	0	0	0	0	0	0	0	0	0	0	0	0	0	0	0	3	3	0
Bulgaria	5	1	4	0	0	0	0	0	0	0	0	0	0	0	0	0	0	0	1	0	1	0	0	0	—	—	—	4	1	3
Canada	1	0	1	0	0	0	1	0	1	0	0	0	0	0	0	0	0	0	—	—	—	—	—	—	—	—	—	0	0	0
Czech Republic	6	1	5	0	0	0	0	0	0	0	0	0	0	0	0	0	0	0	0	0	0	4	1	3	—	—	—	2	0	2
Denmark	4	4	0	0	0	0	0	0	0	0	0	0	0	0	0	0	0	0	0	0	0	0	0	0	—	—	—	4	4	0
Egypt	1	0	1	0	0	0	0	0	0	0	0	0	0	0	0	0	0	0	—	—	—	—	—	—	1	0	1	0	0	0
Estonia	9	5	4	0	0	0	0	0	0	0	0	0	0	0	0	0	0	0	1	0	1	3	3	0	—	—	—	5	2	3
Finland	7	1	6	0	0	0	0	0	0	0	0	0	0	0	0	0	0	0	1	0	1	0	0	0	—	—	—	6	1	5
France	1	0	1	0	0	0	0	0	0	0	0	0	0	0	0	0	0	0	1	0	1	0	0	0	0	0	0	0	0	0
Germany	8	1	7	0	0	0	0	0	0	0	0	0	0	0	0	0	0	0	0	0	0	2	1	1	—	—	—	6	0	6
Great Britain	8	3	5	0	0	0	0	0	0	0	0	0	0	0	0	0	0	0	0	0	0	8	3	5	—	—	—	0	0	0
Greece	7	3	4	0	0	0	0	0	0	0	0	0	0	0	0	0	0	0	0	0	0	5	2	3	0	0	0	2	1	1
Hungary	8	1	7	0	0	0	0	0	0	0	0	0	0	0	0	0	0	0	0	0	0	0	0	0	—	—	—	8	1	7
Israel	9	6	3	0	0	0	0	0	0	0	0	0	0	0	0	0	0	0	0	0	0	4	3	1	—	—	—	5	3	2
Italy	4	0	4	0	0	0	1	0	1	0	0	0	0	0	0	0	0	0	3	0	3	0	0	0				0	0	0
Latvia	4	2	2	0	0	0	0	0	0	0	0	0	0	0	0	0	0	0	0	0	0	0	0	0	—	—	—	4	2	2
North Macedonia	4	3	1	0	0	0	0	0	0	0	0	0	0	0	0	0	0	0	0	0	0	0	0	0	0	0	0	4	3	1
Montenegro	4	2	2	0	0	0	0	0	0	0	0	0	0	0	0	0	0	0	0	0	0	0	0	0	0	0	0	4	2	2
Netherlands	6	2	4	0	0	0	0	0	0	0	0	0	0	0	0	0	0	0	0	0	0	2	0	2	—	—	—	4	2	2
Norway	3	3	0	0	0	0	0	0	0	0	0	0	0	0	0	0	0	0	0	0	0	0	0	0	—	—	—	3	3	0
Poland	2	0	2	0	0	0	1	0	1	0	0	0	0	0	0	0	0	0	1	0	1	0	0	0	—	—	—	0	0	0
Portugal	9	4	5	0	0	0	0	0	0	0	0	0	0	0	0	0	0	0	1	1	0	0	0	0	—	—	—	8	3	5
Romania	4	4	0	0	0	0	0	0	0	0	0	0	0	0	0	0	0	0	0	0	0	2	2	0	—	—	—	2	2	0
Russia	6	1	5	0	0	0	0	0	0	0	0	0	0	0	0	0	0	0	1	0	1	4	1	3	—	—	—	1	0	1
Slovakia	4	3	1	0	0	0	0	0	0	0	0	0	0	0	0	0	0	0	0	0	0	1	1	0	—	—	—	3	2	1
Slovenia	9	1	8	0	0	0	0	0	0	0	0	0	0	0	0	0	0	0	0	0	0	6	1	5	0	0	0	3	0	3
Spain	9	2	7	0	0	0	0	0	0	0	0	0	0	0	0	0	0	0	0	0	0	5	1	4	1	0	1	3	1	2
Sweden	2	0	2	0	0	0	0	0	0	0	0	0	0	0	0	0	0	0	0	0	0	0	0	0	—	—	—	2	0	2
Switzerland	4	4	0	0	0	0	0	0	0	0	0	0	0	0	0	0	0	0	0	0	0	0	0	0	—	—	—	4	4	0
Turkey	20	8	12	0	0	0	0	0	0	0	0	0	0	0	0	0	0	0	0	0	0	17	8	9				3	0	3
Ukraine	4	1	3	0	0	0	0	0	0	0	0	0	0	0	0	0	0	0	1	1	0	0	0	0	—	—	—	3	0	3
Total (35)	198	81	118																											

== See also ==
- Croatia women's national volleyball team
