= Ivan Ćosić =

Ivan Ćosić may refer to:

- Ivan Ćosić (footballer) (born 1989), Croatian-German footballer
- Ivan Ćosić (volleyball) (born 1984), Croatian volleyball player
- Ivan Ćosić (handballer) (born 1986), Croatian handball player
