= U Mumba Volley =

Indian volleyball team

- Founded: 2018
- Owner: Unilazer Ventures
- Chairman: Ronnie Screwvala
- League: Pro Volleyball League

Uniforms
Home	Away

U Mumba Volley was a men's volleyball team from Mumbai, Maharastra playing in the Pro Volleyball League in India.

== Team ==
Team roster – Season 2019
U Mumba Volley
No.	Name	Position
2	(Canada) Nicholas Bianco	attacker
13	(India) Pankaj Sharma	attacker
4	(India) Hardeep Singh	attacker
5	(Turkey) Tomislav Coskovic	attacker
7	(India) John Joseph E. J.	blocker
8	(India) Prince	blocker
9	(India) Parshant Saroha	setter
12	(India) Deepesh Sinha(c)	blocker
14	(India) Saqlain Tariq	setter
11	(India) DNK Venkatesh	libero
15	(India) Vinit Kumar	universal
10	(India) Shubam Chaudhary	universal
Head coach: Pritam Singh Chauhan		
