= Sušić =

Sušić is a Bosnian surname. Notable people with the surname include:

- Derviš Sušić (1925–1990), Bosniak writer
- Mateo Sušić (born 1990), Bosnian football player
- Safet Sušić (born 1955), Bosnian former footballer
- Sead Sušić (born 1953), Bosnian former footballer
- Tamara Sušić (born 1990), Croatian volleyball player
- Tino-Sven Sušić (born 1992), Bosnian-born Belgian footballer

== See also ==
- Massimo Susic
