= Kose (disambiguation) =

Kose is a small borough in Kose Parish, Harju County, Estonia.

Kose may also refer to:

== Places ==
- Kose Parish, a municipality in Harju County
- Kose, Võru County, a small borough in Võru Parish, Võru County
- Kose, Ida-Viru County, a village in Jõhvi Parish, Ida-Viru County
- Kose, Jõgeva County, a village in Põltsamaa Parish, Jõgeva County
- Kose, Pärnu County, a village in Põhja-Pärnumaa Parish, Pärnu County
- Kose, Tallinn, a subdistrict of Tallinn
- Kose, Võru, a subdistrict of Võru

== People ==
=== As a surname ===
- Köse (surname)
- Jeremiah Kose (born 1993), American football player

== Business ==
- Kosé, a Japanese personal care company

== Other ==
- KOSE (AM), a radio station (860 AM) licensed to serve Wilson, Arkansas, United States
- KOSE-FM, a radio station (107.3 FM) licensed to serve Osceola, Arkansas
