= Cédric Énard =

French volleyball player and coach

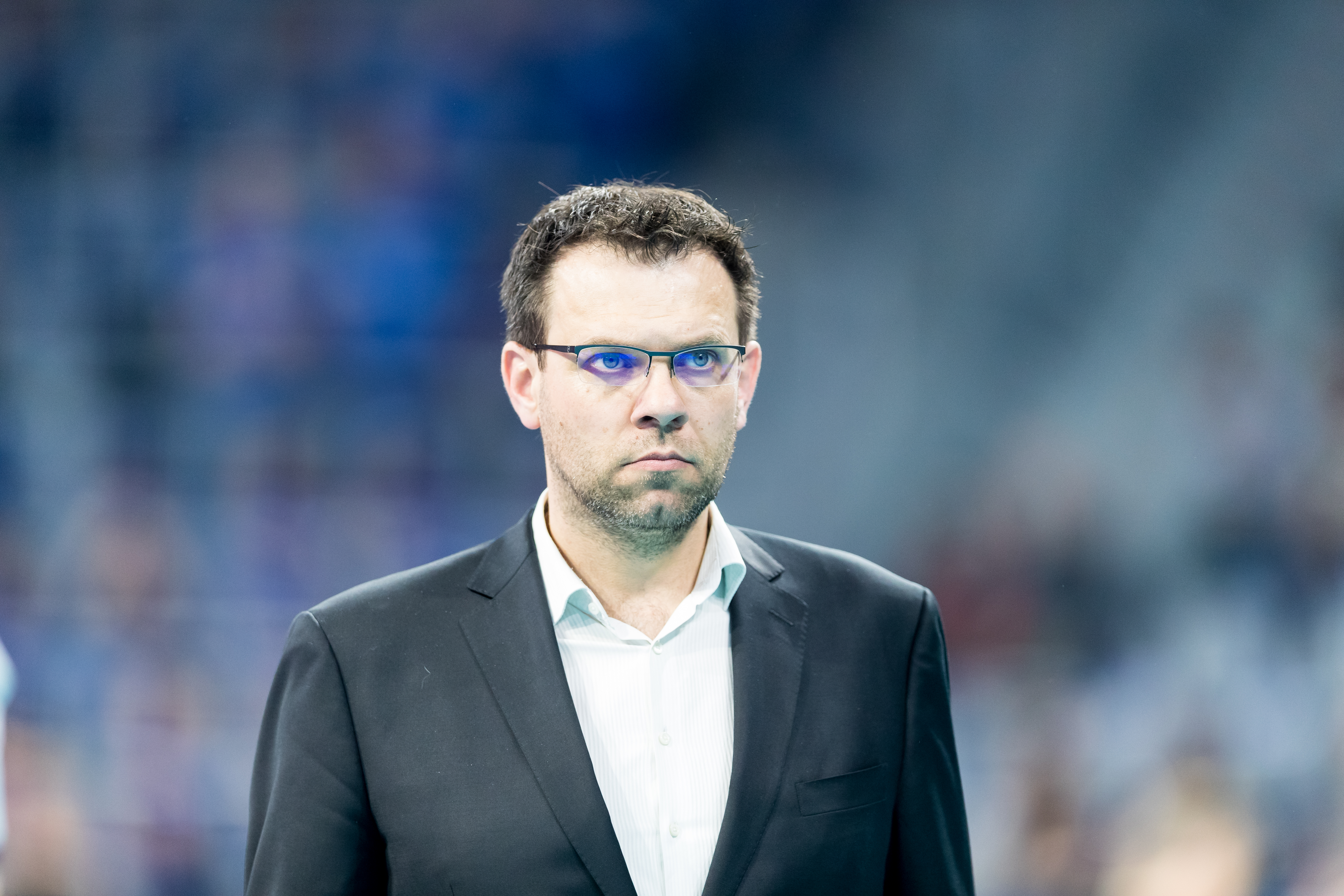

Personal information
- Born: 20 March 1976 (age 50); Vouillé, France

Coaching information
Previous teams coached
Years	Teams
2004–2011; 2011–2017; 2017–2018; 2017–2019; 2018–2023; 2019–2021; 2022–2023; 2024	Spacer's de Toulouse (AC); Spacer's de Toulouse; Tours VB; France (AC); Berlin Recycling Volleys; Estonia; Croatia; Turkey

Volleyball information
- Position: Middle blocker

Career
Years	Teams
1997–1999; 1999–2002; 2002–2005	Stade Poitevin Poitiers; Avignon VB; Spacer's de Toulouse
Honours
Men's volleyball
Head coach Croatia
European League
Bronze medal – third place	2023 Croatia
Mediterranean Games
Gold medal – first place	2022 Oran

Cédric Énard (born 20 March 1976) is a French professional volleyball coach and former player.

== Honours ==
=== As a player ===
- Domestic
  - 1998–99 French Championship, with Stade Poitevin Poitiers

=== As a coach ===
- Domestic
  - 2017–18 French Championship, with Tours VB
  - 2018–19 German Championship, with Berlin Recycling Volleys
  - 2019–20 German SuperCup, with Berlin Recycling Volleys
  - 2019–20 German Cup, with Berlin Recycling Volleys
  - 2020–21 German SuperCup, with Berlin Recycling Volleys
  - 2020–21 German Championship, with Berlin Recycling Volleys
  - 2021–22 German SuperCup, with Berlin Recycling Volleys
  - 2021–22 German Championship, with Berlin Recycling Volleys
  - 2022–23 German SuperCup, with Berlin Recycling Volleys
  - 2022–23 German Cup, with Berlin Recycling Volleys
  - 2022–23 German Championship, with Berlin Recycling Volleys
