= 2006 Men's European Volleyball League =

Tournament details
- Host country: Turkey
- Dates: July 21 – August 13 (qualification); August 19/20 (final four)
- Teams: 8
- Venue: 1 (in 1 host city)

Final positions
- Champions: Netherlands (1st title)

Tournament awards
- MVP: (Netherlands) Guido Görtzen

The 2006 Men's European Volleyball League was the third edition of the European Volleyball League, organised by Europe's governing volleyball body, the CEV. The final Four was held in İzmir, Turkey from 19 to 20 August 2006.

== Competing nations ==
- Croatia
- Estonia
- Germany
- Greece
- Netherlands
- Slovakia
- Spain
- Turkey

== League round ==
Pos	Team	Pld	W	L	Pts	SW	SL	SR	SPW	SPL	SPR	Qualification
1	Netherlands	12	12	0	24	36	9	4.000	1061	935	1.135	Final Four
2	Croatia	12	8	4	20	28	19	1.474	1089	1039	1.048	Final Four
3	Greece	12	7	5	19	25	19	1.316	1016	983	1.034	Final Four
4	Germany	12	6	6	18	26	22	1.182	1082	1041	1.039	
5	Turkey (Note: Qualified as hosts) (H)	12	6	6	18	24	24	1.000	1080	1082	0.998	Final Four
6	Spain	12	6	6	18	21	25	0.840	1012	1039	0.974	
7	Slovakia	12	2	10	14	15	30	0.500	982	1060	0.926	
8	Estonia	12	1	11	13	7	34	0.206	868	1011	0.859	

(H) Host

== Final four ==
Semi-finals
2006-08-19 – İzmir
Croatia	3
Greece	1
2006-08-19 – İzmir
Netherlands	3
Turkey	2

Final
2006-08-20 – İzmir
Croatia	1
Netherlands	3
3rd place
2006-08-20 – İzmir
Greece	3
Turkey	2

=== Semi-finals ===
Date	Time		Score		Set 1	Set 2	Set 3	Set 4	Set 5	Total	Report
19 Aug	17:00	Croatia	3–1	Greece	22–25	25–21	25–16	28–26		100–88	Report
19 Aug	19:30	Netherlands	3–2	Turkey	23–25	25–22	23–25	25–23	17–15	113–110	Report

=== 3rd place match ===
Date	Time		Score		Set 1	Set 2	Set 3	Set 4	Set 5	Total	Report
20 Aug	17:00	Turkey	2–3	Greece	25–22	25–21	20–25	21–25	10–15	101–108	Report

=== Final ===
Date	Time		Score		Set 1	Set 2	Set 3	Set 4	Set 5	Total	Report
20 Aug	19:30	Netherlands	3–1	Croatia	19–25	25–20	25–21	27–25		96–91	Report

== Final standing ==
Rank	Team
1st place, gold medalist(s)	Netherlands
2nd place, silver medalist(s)	Croatia
3rd place, bronze medalist(s)	Greece
4	Turkey
5	Germany
6	Spain
7	Slovakia
8	Estonia

2006 European League champions

Netherlands
1st title

== Awards ==
- Most valuable player
  (Netherlands) Guido Görtzen
- Best scorer
  (Netherlands) Marko Klok
- Best spiker
  (Netherlands) Michael Olieman
- Best blocker
  (Greece) Sotirios Pantaleon
- Best server
  (Croatia) Tomislav Coskovic
- Best libero
  (Turkey) Nuri Şahin
