= Petr Pláteník =

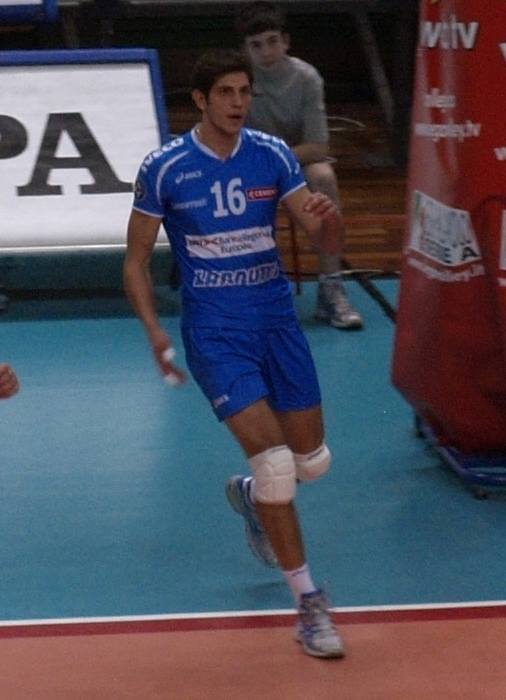

Personal information
- Nationality: Czech
- Born: 16 March 1981 (age 45); Světlá nad Sázavou, Czechoslovakia
- Height: 6 ft 5 in (1.96 m)
- Weight: 194 lb (88 kg)
- Spike: 141 in (358 cm)
- Block: 137 in (348 cm)

Volleyball information
- Position: Outside spiker

Career
Years	Teams
1999–2002; 2002–2004; 2004–2005; 2005–2006; 2006–2007; 2007–2008; 2008–2009; 2009–2011; 2011; 2011–2012; 2012–2013	(Czech Republic) AERO Odolena Voda (Belgium) Noliko Maaseik (Greece) Panathinaikos Athens (Italy) Bre Banca Lannutti Cuneo (Italy) Sparkling Milan (Italy) Antonveneta Padova (Italy) Bre Banca Lannutti Cuneo (Turkey) Ziraat Bankası Ankara (Russia) Dinamo Krasnodar (Turkey) Halkbank Ankara (Czech Republic) Jihostroj České Budějovice

National team
Czech Republic

Petr Pláteník (born 16 March 1981) is a Czech volleyball player. He plays on position outside spiker.

== Sporting achievements ==
=== Clubs ===
Czech Championship:

- 2002, 2013
- 2001

Belgium Supercup:

- 2002, 2003

Belgium Cup:

- 2003, 2004

Belgium Championship:

- 2003, 2004

Greece Championship:

- 2005

Italian Cup:

- 2006

CEV Cup:

- 2009

Turkey Cup:

- 2010

Turkish Championship:

- 2010
- 2011, 2012

=== National team ===
European League:

- 2004

== Individual awards ==
- 2004: MVP European League
