= Igor Šimunčić =

Croatian volleyball player and coach

Igor Šimunčić (born 12 December 1973 in Zagreb, Croatia) is professional volleyball coach from Croatia. He is a former head coach of Croatia men's national volleyball team and many professional volleyball teams around Europe and also former professional volleyball player.

As a head coach of Croatian senior national team he was on CEV European Championship 2015 and won silver medal in CEV European league 2013. As a member of the Croatian national team, Šimunčić competed at the 2002 World Championship and won bronze at the 1997 Mediterranean Games.

== Teams ==
Current team: none

=== National team head coach ===
- 2005-2008 Croatia - junior men's national team head coach
- 2012-2017 Croatia - senior men's national team head coach

=== Previous teams coached ===
- 2005-2006 MOK Zagreb (Croatia)
- 2006-2007 Mladost Zagreb (Croatia)
- 2008-2010 MOK Zagreb (Croatia)
- 2010-2012 SK Posojilnica Aich/Dob (Austria)
- 2013-2015 ZOK Vukovar woman team (Croatia)
- 2016-2018 VCA Amstetten (Austria)
- 2018-2020 Salonit Anhovo (Slovenia)
- 2020-2021 VCA Amstetten (Austria)

=== Players career ===
- 1988-1993 Mladost Zagreb (Croatia)
- 1993-1996 Salonit Anhovo (Slovenia)
- 1997-1998 Plomien Sosnowiec (Poland)
- 1999-2000 GFCOA Ajjaccio (France)
- 2000-2002 Hypo Tirol Innsbruck (Austria)
- 2002-2003 Omniworld Almere (The Netherlands)
- 2003-2004 Salonit Anhovo (Slovenia)
- 2004-2005 Pafiakos Pafos (Cyprus)

=== National team player career ===
- 1992-2002 Croatia (128 matches)
