= Tsimafei Zhukouski =

Croatian volleyball player (born 1989)

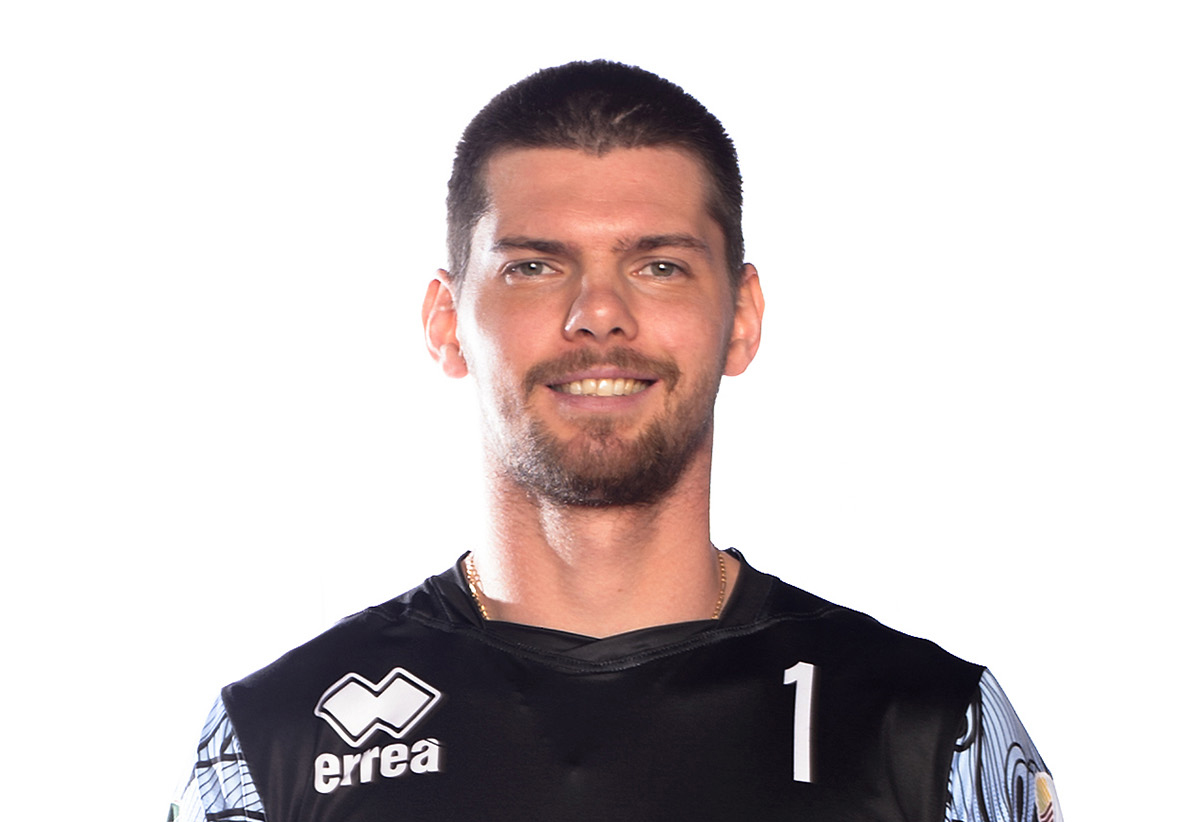
- Zhukouski in 2019

Personal information
- Born: 18 December 1989 (age 36) Minsk, Byelorussian SSR, Soviet Union
- Height: 1.96 m (6 ft 5 in)
- Weight: 84 kg (185 lb)
- Spike: 320 cm (126 in)
- Block: 311 cm (122 in)

Volleyball information
- Position: Setter

Career
- Years: Team
- 2006–2010 2010–2011 2011–2012 2012–2013 2013–2014 2014 2015–2017 2017–2018 2018–2019 2019–2020 2020–2022 2022–2024: Mladost Zagreb; Umbria Volley; Gabeca Pallavolo; CMC Ravenna; Generali Unterhaching; Exprivia Neldiritto Molfetta; Berlin Recycling Volleys; Cucine Lube Civitanova; Volley Callipo; Sir Safety Perugia; Fakel Novy Urengoy; Stal Nysa

National team
- Years: Team
- –: Croatia
Honours
Men's volleyball
Representing Croatia
European League
Silver medal – second place	2013 Turkey
Bronze medal – third place	2023 Croatia

Tsimafei Zhukouski (Belarusian: Цімафей Жукоўскі; born 18 December 1989) is a Croatian professional volleyball player who plays as a setter for the Croatia national team. As a player of Mladost Zagreb, he has won the Croatian Championship in 2007, 2008 and 2010, as well as two national cups in 2008 and 2009.

== Honours ==
=== Club ===
- CEV Champions League
  - 2017–18 – with Cucine Lube Civitanova
- CEV Cup
  - 2015–16 – with Berlin Recycling Volleys
- CEV Challenge Cup
  - 2009–10 – with Mladost Zagreb
- Domestic
  - 2006–07 Croatian Championship, with Mladost Zagreb
  - 2007–08 Croatian Cup, with Mladost Zagreb
  - 2007–08 Croatian Championship, with Mladost Zagreb
  - 2008–09 Croatian Cup, with Mladost Zagreb
  - 2009–10 Croatian Cup, with Mladost Zagreb
  - 2009–10 Croatian Championship, with Mladost Zagreb
  - 2015–16 German Cup, with Berlin Recycling Volleys
  - 2015–16 German Championship, with Berlin Recycling Volleys
  - 2016–17 German Championship, with Berlin Recycling Volleys
  - 2017–18 Italian Championship, with Cucine Lube Civitanova
  - 2019–20 Italian SuperCup, with Sir Safety Conad Perugia
