= 2008 Men's European Volleyball League =

Tournament details
- Host country: Turkey
- Dates: June 13 – July 13 (qualification); July 19/20 (final four)
- Teams: 9
- Venue: 1 (in 1 host city)

Final positions
- Champions: Slovakia (1st title)

Tournament awards
- MVP: (Slovakia) Martin Sopko

The 2008 Men's European Volleyball League was the fifth edition of the European Volleyball League, organised by Europe's governing volleyball body, the CEV. The final Four was held in Bursa, Turkey from 19 to 20 July 2008.

For the first time Great Britain joined the competition and it will also enter it as a unified team as a result of a FIVB decision which allows the United Kingdom to play as a unified team in order to prepare for the next 2012 Summer Olympics in London. Austria and Belarus also joined the European League for the first time.

The tournament was won by Slovakia, defeating the Netherlands by 3–1 in the finals.

== Competing nations ==
- Austria
- Belarus
- Germany
- Great Britain
- Greece
- Netherlands
- Portugal
- Slovakia
- Turkey

== League round ==
=== Pool A ===
Pos	Team	Pld	W	L	Pts	SW	SL	SR	SPW	SPL	SPR	Qualification
1	Netherlands	12	12	0	24	36	11	3.273	1096	951	1.152	Final Four
2	Slovakia	12	8	4	20	29	16	1.813	1025	936	1.095	Final Four
3	Greece	12	4	8	16	21	25	0.840	1019	1029	0.990	
4	Portugal	12	4	8	16	18	26	0.692	954	1003	0.951	
5	Great Britain	12	2	10	14	7	33	0.212	796	971	0.820	

=== Pool B ===
Pos	Team	Pld	W	L	Pts	SW	SL	SR	SPW	SPL	SPR	Qualification
1	Germany	12	8	4	20	27	18	1.500	1059	970	1.092	Final Four
2	Turkey (Note: Qualified as hosts) (H)	12	6	6	18	24	24	1.000	1055	1070	0.986	Final Four
3	Belarus	12	6	6	18	22	25	0.880	1059	1093	0.969	
4	Austria	12	4	8	16	19	25	0.760	993	1033	0.961	

(H) Host

== Final four ==
Semi-finals
2008-07-19 – Bursa
Slovakia	3
Germany	2
2008-07-19 – Bursa
Netherlands	3
Turkey	1

Final
2008-07-20 – Bursa
Slovakia	3
Netherlands	1
3rd place
2008-07-20 – Bursa
Germany	2
Turkey	3

=== Semi-finals ===
Date	Time		Score		Set 1	Set 2	Set 3	Set 4	Set 5	Total	Report
19 Jul	17:00	Slovakia	3–2	Germany	27–25	25–21	13–25	17–25	19–17	101–113	Report
19 Jul	19:30	Netherlands	3–1	Turkey	25–21	25–19	31–33	25–16		106–89	Report

=== 3rd place match ===
Date	Time		Score		Set 1	Set 2	Set 3	Set 4	Set 5	Total	Report
20 Jul	17:00	Germany	2–3	Turkey	25–23	25–23	16–25	22–25	13–15	101–111	Report

=== Final ===
Date	Time		Score		Set 1	Set 2	Set 3	Set 4	Set 5	Total	Report
20 Jul	19:30	Slovakia	3–1	Netherlands	25–21	25–18	20–25	25–23		95–87	Report

== Final standing ==
Rank	Team
1st place, gold medalist(s)	Slovakia
2nd place, silver medalist(s)	Netherlands
3rd place, bronze medalist(s)	Turkey
4	Germany
5	Belarus
6	Greece
7	Austria
8	Portugal
9	Great Britain

2008 European League champions

Slovakia
1st title

12-man Roster for Final Round
Milan Bencz, Miroslav Jakubov, Peter Janusek, Jakub Joscak, Tomas Kmet, Emanuel Kohut, Michal Masny, Martin Nemec, Lubos Ochodnicky, Roman Ondrusek, Martin Sopko, Juraj Zatko
Head coach

== Awards ==
- Most valuable player
  (Slovakia) Martin Sopko
- Best scorer
  (Germany) György Grozer
- Best spiker
  (Turkey) Volkan Güç
- Best blocker
  (Slovakia) Tomas Kmet
- Best server
  (Slovakia) Martin Sopko
- Best setter
  (Netherlands) Yannick van Harskamp
- Best receiver
  (Germany) Ferdinand Tille
- Best libero
  (Netherlands) Jelte Maan
