= Marko Sedlaček =

Croatian volleyball player (born 1996)

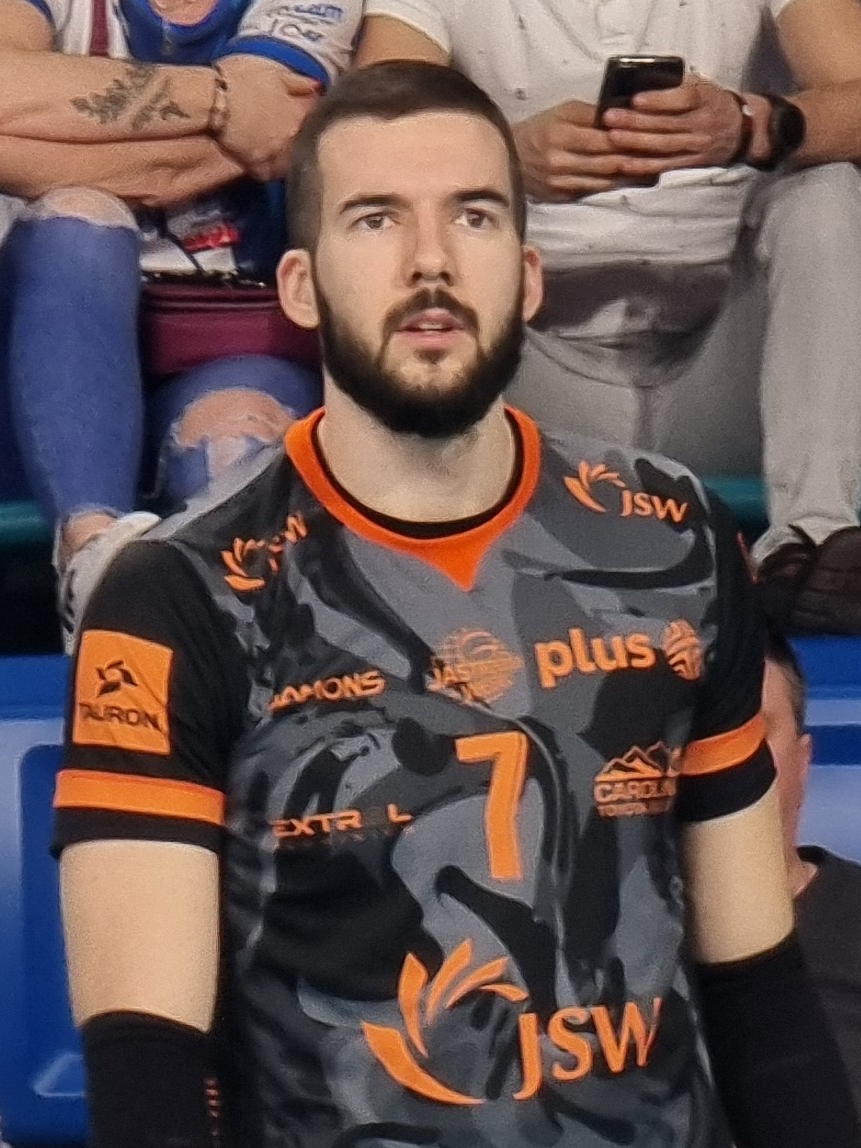
- Marko Sedlaček in 2024

Personal information
- Born: 29 July 1996 (age 30); Zagreb, Croatia
- Height: 2.02 m (6 ft 8 in)
- Weight: 95 kg (209 lb)
- Spike: 360 cm (142 in)
- Block: 340 cm (134 in)

Volleyball information
- Position: Outside hitter
- Current club: Olympiakos Piraeus

Career
Years	Teams
2013–2014; 2014–2015; 2015–2016; 2016–2019; 2019–2020; 2021–2022; 2022–2023; 2023–2024; 2024–2025; 2025; 2025-01.26; 01.26-03.26; 2026–	Mladost Zagreb; Rennes Volley 35; LPR Piacenza; Mladost Zagreb; Vero Volley Monza; Galatasaray İstanbul; Top Volley Cisterna; Jastrzębski Węgiel; Pallavolo Padova; Palembang BSB; Cuneo Volley; Olympiakos Piraeus; Dinamo LO

National team
Croatiabr
Honours
Men's volleyball
Representing Croatia
European League
Silver medal – second place	2013 Turkey
Mediterranean Games
Gold medal – first place	2022 Oran
- Last updated: 6 April 2026

Marko Sedlaček (born 29 July 1996) is a Croatian professional volleyball player who plays as an outside hitter for the Russian club Dinamo LO and the Croatia national team.

== Career ==
On 12 May 2021, Sedlaček signed a contract with Galatasaray. The next season (2022–23) he played for the Italian club Top Volley Cisterna before he moved to Poland for Jastrzębski Węgiel (2023–24). In the 2024–25 season he returned to Italy, initially playing for Pallavolo Padova, but finished the season at Palembang BSB. The summer of 2025 he signed with Cuneo Volley, where he stayed until January 2026, when he signed with Greek club Olympiacos Piraeus. After his contract with the Piraeus team expired, he moved to Russia for Dynamo LO.

== Honours ==
=== Club ===
- CEV Champions League
  - 2023–24 – with Jastrzębski Węgiel
- Domestic
  - 2013–14 Croatian Cup, with Mladost Zagreb
  - 2016–17 Croatian SuperCup, with Mladost Zagreb
  - 2016–17 Croatian Cup, with Mladost Zagreb
  - 2017–18 Croatian SuperCup, with Mladost Zagreb
  - 2017–18 Croatian Championship, with Mladost Zagreb
  - 2018–19 Croatian Cup, with Mladost Zagreb
  - 2018–19 Croatian Championship, with Mladost Zagreb
  - 2023–24 Polish Championship, with Jastrzębski Węgiel
