= Volkan Güç =

Turkish volleyball player (born 1980)

Personal information
- Born: 16 July 1980 (age 46) Adana, Turkey
- Height: 2.02 m (6 ft 8 in)
- Weight: 100 kg (220 lb)
- Spike: 345 cm (136 in)
- Block: 332 cm (131 in)

Volleyball information
- Position: Opposite setter
- Current club: Galatasaray
- Number: 8

Career
- Years: Team
- 2010-present: Sasaspor; Arçelikspor; Fenerbahçe; Halkbank; Istanbul BB; Galatasaray

National team
- Years: Team
- –: Turkey

Volkan Güç (16 July 1980 in Adana, Turkey) is a Turkish volleyball player. He is member of the Turkey men's national volleyball team. The 2.02 m (6 ft 8 in) tall sportsman plays as opposite setter. He studied at Istanbul University.

He began his volleyball career in 1994 in Sasa Sports Club in Adana, where he played three years. In 2005, Volkan Güç transferred from Arçelik S.K. to Fenerbahçe Men's Volleyball. After playing for Halkbank Ankara, he moved first to Istanbul Büyükşehir Belediyespor, and finally in 2010 to Galatasaray Yurtiçi Kargo.

At the 2008 Men's European Volleyball League, he was named "Best Spiker".
