= Kamil Baránek =

Czech volleyball player (born 1983)

Kamil Baranek
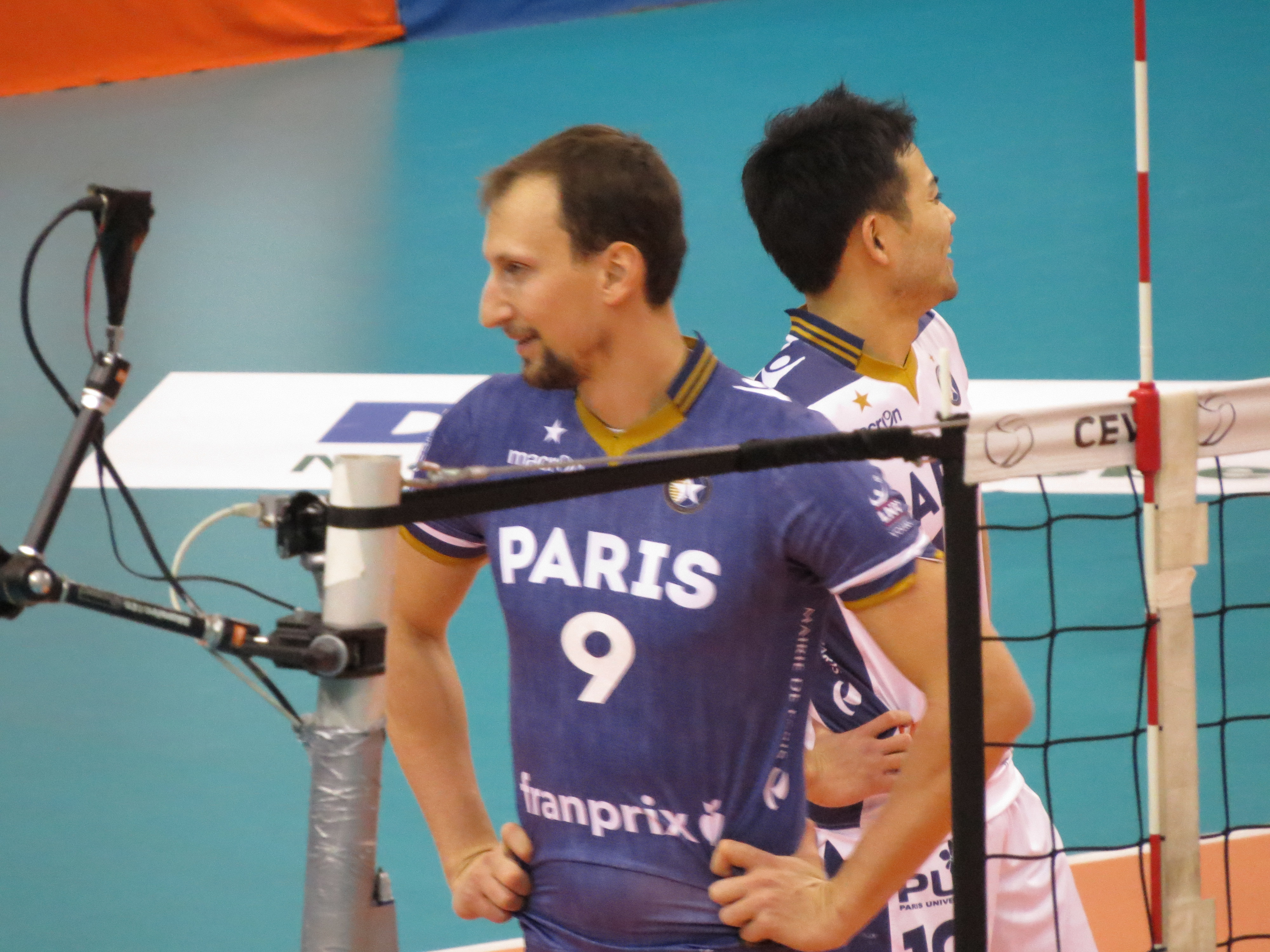

Personal information
- Nationality: Czech
- Born: 2 May 1983 (age 43)
- Height: 198 cm (6 ft 6 in)
- Weight: 93 kg (205 lb)
- Spike: 350 cm (138 in)
- Block: 335 cm (132 in)

Volleyball information
- Number: 13 (national team)

Career
Years	Teams
2015	Galatasaray Istanbul

National team
2015	Czech Republic

Kamil Baranek (born 2 May 1983) is a Czech male volleyball player. He is part of the Czech Republic men's national volleyball team. On club level he plays for Galatasaray Istanbul.
