= Tamara Sušić =

Croatian volleyball player and coach

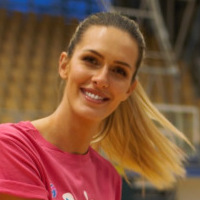

Personal information
- Nationality: Croatian
- Born: 28 November 1990 (age 35); Čapljina
- Height: 1.93 m (6 ft 4 in)
- Weight: 72 kg (159 lb)
- Spike: 318 cm (125 in)
- Block: 308 cm (121 in)

National team
2015	Croatia

Tamara Sušić (born 28 November 1990 in Čapljina, Bosnia and Herzegovina) is a Croatian volleyball player who turned to volleyball coaching. She was a member of strongest Croatian teams (National CUP and league winner ŽOK Rijeka, HAOK Mladost) and later international teams, including VC Pomi Casalmaggiore. She played for both the junior and senior Croatia women's national volleyball team. She remained active in volleyball as coach and organizer of Pro Volley camp.

== Career ==
She was part of the Croatian national team at the 2015 FIVB World Grand Prix, and at the 2015 European Games in Baku, Azerbaijan.

In 2013-2015 she played for CSM București winning CEV Challenge Cup. In 2015-2016 she played for VBC Pomì Casalmaggiore, at the 2016 FIVB Volleyball Women's Club World Championship winning silver. After the transfer to Poland she soon finished her player career due to accumulation of injuries and soon started working as a coach.

She lives and works in Rijeka, Croatia coaching volleyball club in Kostrena and leading Volleyball camp for Pro Volley with Tomislav Čosković.

== Clubs ==
Club	Years
Croatia ŽOK Split	2010-2011
Croatia ŽOK Rijeka	2011-2013
Romania CSM Bukareszt	2013-2015
Italy VC Pomi Casalmaggiore	2015-2016
Poland VC Commercecon Łódź	2017
