= Köse (surname) =

- Language: Turkish

Origin
- Meaning: beardless

Köse is a Turkish surname. Notable people with the surname include:

- Bahattin Köse, German-Turkish footballer
- Damla Köse (born 2000), Turkish sport shooter
- Ibrahim Köse, Finnish footballer of Turkish descent
- Karya Köse (born 1997), Turkish female water polo player
- Nursel Köse, German actress of Turkish descent
- Ramazan Köse, Turkish footballer
- Serkan Köse (born 1976), Swedish politician
- Tevfik Köse, Turkish striker

== See also ==
- Ćosić, Slavic surname
- Köse, Turkish town
