= Drago Ćosić =

Croatian sports commentator (born 1958)

Drago Ćosić (born 20 September 1958) is a Croatian television journalist and sports commentator.

== Early life ==
Ćosić was born in Teslić, Bosnia.

== Career ==
Drago Ćosić's greatest successes are numerous Olympic Games and world football championships, which he broadcast from the spot for viewers via HRT. As of September 12, 2018, he is no longer an employee of Croatian Radio and Television, where he spent almost his entire journalistic career.

Notably, Ćosić broadcast the match for third place at the World Cup in France in 1998. Croatia won 2:1. He broadcast the entire World Cup in Russia 2018, where Croatia won 2nd place by beating England 2:1 in the semi-finals and losing to France in the final with 2:4.

He currently works as a spokesperson for the Croatian Handball Association.
