= Jan Galabov =

Czech volleyball player (born 1996)

Personal information
- Born: 12 June 1996 (age 30); Prague, Czech Republic
- Height: 1.91 m (6 ft 3 in)
- Weight: 89 kg (196 lb)
- Spike: 352 cm (139 in)
- Block: 320 cm (126 in)

Volleyball information
- Position: Outside hitter
- Current club: Sporting CP
- Number: 3

Career
Years	Teams
2014–2018; 2018–2020; 2020–2022; 2022–2023; 2023–	Dukla Liberec; Nice VB; BKS Visła Bydgoszcz; Chaumont VB 52; Sporting CP

National team
Czech Republic
Honours
Men's volleyball
Representing Czech Republic
European League
Gold medal – first place	2022 Croatia

Jan Galabov (born 12 June 1996) is a Czech professional volleyball player who plays as an outside hitter for Sporting and the Czech Republic national team.

== Personal life ==
Galabov is of Bulgarian descent through his grandfather. He was eligible to represent Bulgaria in international competitions, but elected the Czech national team.

== Honours ==
=== Club ===
- Domestic
  - 2014–15 Czech Championship, with Dukla Liberec
  - 2015–16 Czech Cup, with Dukla Liberec
  - 2015–16 Czech Championship, with Dukla Liberec
  - 2017–18 Czech Cup, with Dukla Liberec
  - 2023–24 Portuguese Cup, with Sporting CP
  - 2024–25 Portuguese SuperCup, with Sporting CP

=== Individual awards ===
- 2022: European League – Most valuable player
