= 2022 Men's European Volleyball League =

2022 Men's European Golden League
Tournament details
- Host country: Croatia
- Dates: 25 May – 19 June
- Teams: 11

Final positions
- Champions: Czech Republic (2nd title)
- Runners-up: Turkey
- Third place: Croatia
- Fourth place: Ukraine

Tournament awards
- MVP: (Czech Republic) Jan Galabov

2022 Men's European Volleyball League
Tournament details
- Host country: Hungary
- Dates: 24 May – 19 June
- Teams: 6
- Runners-up: Finland
- Third place: North Macedonia
- Fourth place: Hungary

The 2022 Men's European Volleyball League was the 18th edition of the annual Men's European Volleyball League, which featured men's national volleyball teams from 17 European countries.

The tournament had two divisions: the Golden League, which featured eleven teams, and the Silver League with six teams.

== Pools composition ==
Teams were seeded following the serpentine system according to their CEV European Ranking as of 22 September 2021.

=== Golden league ===
On 1 March 2022, CEV declared Russia and Belarus not eligible for continental competitions due to Russia's invasion of Ukraine. As a result, Belarus was out of the competition. And, Denmark moved from Pool A to B.

| Pool A | Pool B | Pool C |
|---|---|---|
| Turkey (8) | Ukraine (8) | Belgium (8) |
| Portugal (16) | Spain (15) | Czech Republic (12) |
| Slovakia (17) | ~~Belarus (18)~~; Denmark (27) | Estonia (18) |
| ~~Denmark (27)~~ | Croatia (24) | Latvia (23) |

=== Silver league ===
Azerbaijan withdrew after the draw.

| Pool A | Pool B |
|---|---|
| Finland (14) | North Macedonia (22) |
| Hungary (29) | Romania (24) |
| ~~Azerbaijan (31)~~ | Albania (36) |
| | Bosnia and Herzegovina (40) |

== Pool standing procedure ==
1. Total number of victories (matches won, matches lost)
2. In the event of a tie, the following first tiebreaker will apply: The teams will be ranked by the most point gained per match as follows:
  - Match won 3–0 or 3–1: 3 points for the winner, 0 points for the loser
  - Match won 3–2: 2 points for the winner, 1 point for the loser
  - Match forfeited: 3 points for the winner, 0 points (0–25, 0–25, 0–25) for the loser
3. If teams are still tied after examining the number of victories and points gained, then the FIVB will examine the results in order to break the tie in the following order:
  - Set quotient: if two or more teams are tied on the number of points gained, they will be ranked by the quotient resulting from the division of the number of all set won by the number of all sets lost.
  - Points quotient: if the tie persists based on the set quotient, the teams will be ranked by the quotient resulting from the division of all points scored by the total of points lost during all sets.
  - If the tie persists based on the point quotient, the tie will be broken based on the team that won the match of the Round Robin Phase between the tied teams. When the tie in point quotient is between three or more teams, these teams ranked taking into consideration only the matches involving the teams in question.

== League round ==
- All times are local.

=== Golden league ===
==== Pool A ====
| Pos | Team | Pld | W | L | Pts | SW | SL | SR | SPW | SPL | SPR | Qualification |
|---|---|---|---|---|---|---|---|---|---|---|---|---|
| 1 | Turkey | 4 | 4 | 0 | 12 | 12 | 1 | 12.000 | 325 | 258 | 1.260 | Golden league Final round |
| 2 | Portugal | 4 | 2 | 2 | 5 | 7 | 8 | 0.875 | 325 | 339 | 0.959 | |
| 3 | Slovakia | 4 | 0 | 4 | 1 | 2 | 12 | 0.167 | 283 | 336 | 0.842 | |

| Date | Time | | Score | | Set 1 | Set 2 | Set 3 | Set 4 | Set 5 | Total | Report |
|---|---|---|---|---|---|---|---|---|---|---|---|
| 25 May | 17:30 | Turkey | 3–0 | Slovakia | 25–15 | 25–20 | 25–20 | | | 75–55 | Report |
| 29 May | 17:00 | Portugal | 3–0 | Slovakia | 25–18 | 25–22 | 25–18 | | | 75–58 | Report |
| 1 Jun | 21:00 | Portugal | 1–3 | Turkey | 21–25 | 25–21 | 17–25 | 24–26 | | 87–97 | Report |
| 5 Jun | 16:00 | Turkey | 3–0 | Portugal | 25–22 | 25–15 | 25–18 | | | 75–55 | Report |
| 8 Jun | 19:30 | Slovakia | 2–3 | Portugal | 22–25 | 25–23 | 23–25 | 25–19 | 14–16 | 109–108 | Report |
| 11 Jun | 17:00 | Slovakia | 0–3 | Turkey | 16–25 | 19–25 | 26–28 | | | 61–78 | Report |

==== Pool B ====
| Pos | Team | Pld | W | L | Pts | SW | SL | SR | SPW | SPL | SPR | Qualification |
|---|---|---|---|---|---|---|---|---|---|---|---|---|
| 1 | Ukraine | 6 | 6 | 0 | 16 | 18 | 7 | 2.571 | 577 | 531 | 1.087 | Golden league Final round |
| 2 | Croatia (Note: Qualified as hosts) (H) | 6 | 4 | 2 | 11 | 14 | 9 | 1.556 | 509 | 481 | 1.058 | Golden league Final round |
| 3 | Spain | 6 | 2 | 4 | 6 | 10 | 15 | 0.667 | 537 | 553 | 0.971 | |
| 4 | Denmark | 6 | 0 | 6 | 3 | 7 | 18 | 0.389 | 503 | 561 | 0.897 | |

(H) Host
Notes:

| Date | Time | | Score | | Set 1 | Set 2 | Set 3 | Set 4 | Set 5 | Total | Report |
|---|---|---|---|---|---|---|---|---|---|---|---|
| 25 May | 18:30 | Denmark | 2–3 | Spain | 25–19 | 17–25 | 25–22 | 22–25 | 10–15 | 99–106 | Report |
| 25 May | 19:30 | Croatia | 1–3 | Ukraine | 15–25 | 20–25 | 25–21 | 22–25 | | 82–96 | Report |
| 26 May | 19:30 | Ukraine | 3–1 | Croatia | 25–23 | 20–25 | 25–20 | 25–17 | | 95–85 | Report |
| 28 May | 18:00 | Ukraine | 3–1 | Spain | 25–23 | 31–29 | 22–25 | 25–22 | | 103–99 | Report |
| 28 May | 19:30 | Croatia | 3–0 | Denmark | 25–20 | 25–21 | 25–20 | | | 75–61 | Report |
| 29 May | 18:00 | Spain | 0–3 | Ukraine | 21–25 | 19–25 | 15–25 | | | 55–75 | Report |
| 1 Jun | 19:30 | Croatia | 3–1 | Spain | 25–14 | 25–18 | 14–25 | 25–20 | | 89–77 | Report |
| 3 Jun | 18:00 | Ukraine | 3–2 | Denmark | 26–24 | 15–25 | 25–23 | 19–25 | 15–11 | 100–108 | Report |
| 4 Jun | 18:00 | Spain | 2–3 | Croatia | 18–25 | 25–19 | 25–19 | 23–25 | 12–15 | 103–103 | Report |
| 4 Jun | 18:00 | Denmark | 2–3 | Ukraine | 20–25 | 25–20 | 20–25 | 25–23 | 12–15 | 102–108 | Report |
| 8 Jun | 18:00 | Denmark | 0–3 | Croatia | 17–25 | 18–25 | 14–25 | | | 49–75 | Report |
| 11 Jun | 19:00 | Spain | 3–1 | Denmark | 25–22 | 22–25 | 25–23 | 25–14 | | 97–84 | Report |

==== Pool C ====
| Pos | Team | Pld | W | L | Pts | SW | SL | SR | SPW | SPL | SPR | Qualification |
|---|---|---|---|---|---|---|---|---|---|---|---|---|
| 1 | Czech Republic | 6 | 6 | 0 | 18 | 18 | 2 | 9.000 | 495 | 325 | 1.523 | Golden league Final round |
| 2 | Estonia | 6 | 4 | 2 | 11 | 13 | 10 | 1.300 | 482 | 526 | 0.916 | |
| 3 | Belgium | 6 | 2 | 4 | 6 | 8 | 12 | 0.667 | 441 | 471 | 0.936 | |
| 4 | Latvia | 6 | 0 | 6 | 1 | 3 | 18 | 0.167 | 421 | 517 | 0.814 | Relegated to Silver league |

| Date | Time | | Score | | Set 1 | Set 2 | Set 3 | Set 4 | Set 5 | Total | Report |
|---|---|---|---|---|---|---|---|---|---|---|---|
| 25 May | 18:00 | Estonia | 1–3 | Czech Republic | 18–25 | 27–25 | 18–25 | 22–25 | | 85–100 | Report |
| 25 May | 20:30 | Belgium | 3–0 | Latvia | 25–16 | 27–25 | 25–16 | | | 77–57 | Report |
| 28 May | 15:30 | Latvia | 2–3 | Estonia | 26–24 | 26–28 | 19–25 | 25–23 | 12–15 | 108–115 | Report |
| 28 May | 16:00 | Czech Republic | 3–0 | Belgium | 26–24 | 25–16 | 25–12 | | | 76–52 | Report |
| 1 Jun | 18:00 | Estonia | 3–1 | Belgium | 29–27 | 31–29 | 22–25 | 25–13 | | 107–94 | Report |
| 1 Jun | 19:30 | Latvia | 0–3 | Czech Republic | 16–25 | 15–25 | 18–25 | | | 49–75 | Report |
| 4 Jun | 16:00 | Czech Republic | 3–0 | Latvia | 25–14 | 25–22 | 25–20 | | | 75–56 | Report |
| 5 Jun | 19:00 | Belgium | 0–3 | Estonia | 17–25 | 22–25 | 21–25 | | | 60–75 | Report |
| 8 Jun | 20:00 | Estonia | 3–1 | Latvia | 25–17 | 25–22 | 25–27 | 25–23 | | 100–89 | Report |
| 8 Jun | 20:30 | Belgium | 1–3 | Czech Republic | 19–25 | 25–19 | 20–25 | 19–25 | | 83–94 | Report |
| 11 Jun* | 16:00 | Czech Republic | 3–0 | Estonia | 25–0 | 25–0 | 25–0 | | | 75–0 | Report |
| 11 Jun | 19:00 | Latvia | 0–3 | Belgium | 20–25 | 23–25 | 19–25 | | | 62–75 | Report |

* The game was cancelled due to Estonian players giving positive coronavirus tests.

=== Silver league ===
==== Pool A ====
| Pos | Team | Pld | W | L | Pts | SW | SL | SR | SPW | SPL | SPR | Qualification |
|---|---|---|---|---|---|---|---|---|---|---|---|---|
| 1 | Finland | 2 | 2 | 0 | 6 | 6 | 1 | 6.000 | 173 | 135 | 1.281 | Silver league Final round |
| 2 | Hungary (Note: Qualified as hosts) (H) | 2 | 0 | 2 | 0 | 1 | 6 | 0.167 | 135 | 173 | 0.780 | Silver league Final round |

(H) Host
Notes:

| Date | Time | | Score | | Set 1 | Set 2 | Set 3 | Set 4 | Set 5 | Total | Report |
|---|---|---|---|---|---|---|---|---|---|---|---|
| 28 May | 18:30 | Finland | 3–0 | Hungary | 25–20 | 25–17 | 25–16 | | | 75–53 | Report |
| 12 Jun | 17:00 | Hungary | 1–3 | Finland | 21–25 | 25–23 | 17–25 | 19–25 | | 82–98 | Report |

==== Pool B ====
| Pos | Team | Pld | W | L | Pts | SW | SL | SR | SPW | SPL | SPR | Qualification |
|---|---|---|---|---|---|---|---|---|---|---|---|---|
| 1 | Romania | 6 | 5 | 1 | 14 | 16 | 7 | 2.286 | 541 | 471 | 1.149 | Silver league Final round |
| 2 | North Macedonia | 6 | 3 | 3 | 10 | 13 | 10 | 1.300 | 519 | 502 | 1.034 | Silver league Final round |
| 3 | Albania | 6 | 3 | 3 | 10 | 12 | 11 | 1.091 | 511 | 514 | 0.994 | |
| 4 | Bosnia and Herzegovina | 6 | 1 | 5 | 2 | 4 | 17 | 0.235 | 419 | 503 | 0.833 | |

| Date | Time | | Score | | Set 1 | Set 2 | Set 3 | Set 4 | Set 5 | Total | Report |
|---|---|---|---|---|---|---|---|---|---|---|---|
| 24 May | 19:00 | Albania | 1–3 | Romania | 19–25 | 21–25 | 27–25 | 14–25 | | 81–100 | Report |
| 25 May | 20:15 | North Macedonia | 3–0 | Bosnia and Herzegovina | 25–16 | 25–17 | 25–23 | | | 75–56 | Report |
| 28 May | 14:00 | Romania | 3–2 | North Macedonia | 25–22 | 25–17 | 23–25 | 19–25 | 15–13 | 107–102 | Report |
| 28 May | 16:00 | Bosnia and Herzegovina | 3–2 | Albania | 31–29 | 20–25 | 24–26 | 25–18 | 15–8 | 115–106 | Report |
| 1 Jun | 17:00 | Romania | 3–0 | Bosnia and Herzegovina | 25–17 | 25–19 | 25–14 | | | 75–50 | Report |
| 1 Jun | 20:15 | North Macedonia | 1–3 | Albania | 23–25 | 25–20 | 17–25 | 22–25 | | 87–95 | Report |
| 4 Jun | 16:00 | Bosnia and Herzegovina | 1–3 | Romania | 15–25 | 25–22 | 22–25 | 20–25 | | 82–97 | Report |
| 4 Jun | 19:00 | Albania | 3–1 | North Macedonia | 25–20 | 20–25 | 25–16 | 25–22 | | 95–83 | Report |
| 8 Jun | 19:00 | Albania | 3–0 | Bosnia and Herzegovina | 25–16 | 25–17 | 25–21 | | | 75–54 | Report |
| 8 Jun | 20:15 | North Macedonia | 3–1 | Romania | 25–21 | 22–25 | 25–19 | 25–22 | | 97–87 | Report |
| 11 Jun | 16:00 | Bosnia and Herzegovina | 0–3 | North Macedonia | 21–25 | 21–25 | 20–25 | | | 62–75 | Report |
| 12 Jun | 17:00 | Romania | 3–0 | Albania | 25–18 | 25–19 | 25–22 | | | 75–59 | Report |

== Final round ==
- All times are Central European Summer Time (UTC+02:00).

=== Silver League ===
- Venue: Tüskecsarnok, Budapest, Hungary

Semifinals
18 June
Finland | 3
North Macedonia | 1
18 June
Romania | 3
Hungary | 0

Final
19 June
Finland | 2
Romania | 3
3rd place match
19 June
North Macedonia | 3
Hungary | 2

==== Semifinals ====
| Date | Time | | Score | | Set 1 | Set 2 | Set 3 | Set 4 | Set 5 | Total | Report |
|---|---|---|---|---|---|---|---|---|---|---|---|
| 18 Jun | 16:00 | Finland | 3–1 | North Macedonia | 25–22 | 20–25 | 25–18 | 25–16 | | 95–81 | Report |
| 18 Jun | 19:00 | Romania | 3–0 | Hungary | 25–20 | 25–19 | 25–20 | | | 75–59 | Report |

==== 3rd place match ====
| Date | Time | | Score | | Set 1 | Set 2 | Set 3 | Set 4 | Set 5 | Total | Report |
|---|---|---|---|---|---|---|---|---|---|---|---|
| 19 Jun | 16:00 | North Macedonia | 3–2 | Hungary | 25–22 | 18–25 | 25–15 | 19–25 | 15–7 | 102–94 | Report |

==== Final ====
| Date | Time | | Score | | Set 1 | Set 2 | Set 3 | Set 4 | Set 5 | Total | Report |
|---|---|---|---|---|---|---|---|---|---|---|---|
| 19 Jun | 19:00 | Finland | 2–3 | Romania | 25–17 | 21–25 | 25–20 | 23–25 | 13–15 | 107–102 | Report |

=== Golden League ===
- Venue: Varaždin Arena, Varaždin, Croatia

Semifinals
18 June
Turkey | 3
Croatia | 1
18 June
Czech Republic | 3
Ukraine | 2

Final
19 June
Turkey | 1
Czech Republic | 3
3rd place match
19 June
Croatia | 3
Ukraine | 2

==== Semifinals ====
| Date | Time | | Score | | Set 1 | Set 2 | Set 3 | Set 4 | Set 5 | Total | Report |
|---|---|---|---|---|---|---|---|---|---|---|---|
| 18 Jun | 17:00 | Czech Republic | 3–2 | Ukraine | 23–25 | 22–25 | 25–23 | 25–22 | 15–10 | 110–105 | Report |
| 18 Jun | 20:00 | Turkey | 3–1 | Croatia | 27–25 | 21–25 | 25–19 | 25–19 | | 98–88 | Report |

==== 3rd place match ====
| Date | Time | | Score | | Set 1 | Set 2 | Set 3 | Set 4 | Set 5 | Total | Report |
|---|---|---|---|---|---|---|---|---|---|---|---|
| 19 Jun | 15:00 | Croatia | 3–2 | Ukraine | 25–20 | 25–19 | 18–25 | 17–25 | 17–15 | 102–104 | Report |

==== Final ====
| Date | Time | | Score | | Set 1 | Set 2 | Set 3 | Set 4 | Set 5 | Total | Report |
|---|---|---|---|---|---|---|---|---|---|---|---|
| 19 Jun | 20:30 | Turkey | 1–3 | Czech Republic | 21–25 | 22–25 | 25–21 | 25–27 | | 93–98 | Report |

== Final standing ==
| Rank | Team |
|---|---|
| 1st place, gold medalist(s) | Czech Republic |
| 2nd place, silver medalist(s) | Turkey |
| 3rd place, bronze medalist(s) | Croatia |
| 4 | Ukraine |
| 5 | Estonia |
| 5 | Portugal |
| 7 | Belgium |
| 7 | Slovakia |
| 7 | Spain |
| 10 | Denmark |
| 10 | Latvia |
| 12 | Romania |
| 13 | Finland |
| 14 | North Macedonia |
| 15 | Hungary |
| 16 | Albania |
| 17 | Bosnia and Herzegovina |

| Qualified for the 2022 Challenger Cup |
| Qualified for the 2022 Challenger Cup via the 2021 European Golden League |

2022 European League champions

Czech Republic
2nd title

14-man Roster for Golden League Final Round
Milan Moník (L), Daniel Pfeffer (L), Adam Zajíček, Petr Šulista, Martin Licek, Jan Galabov, Daniel Čech, Jiří Srb, Marek Šotola, Luboš Bartůněk, Petr Špulák, Oliver Sedláček, Patrik Indra, Josef Polák
Head coach
Jiří Novák

== Awards ==
- Most Valuable Player
  (Czech Republic) Jan Galabov

== See also ==
- 2022 Women's European Volleyball League
