= Alojzy Świderek =

Polish volleyball player (born 1952)

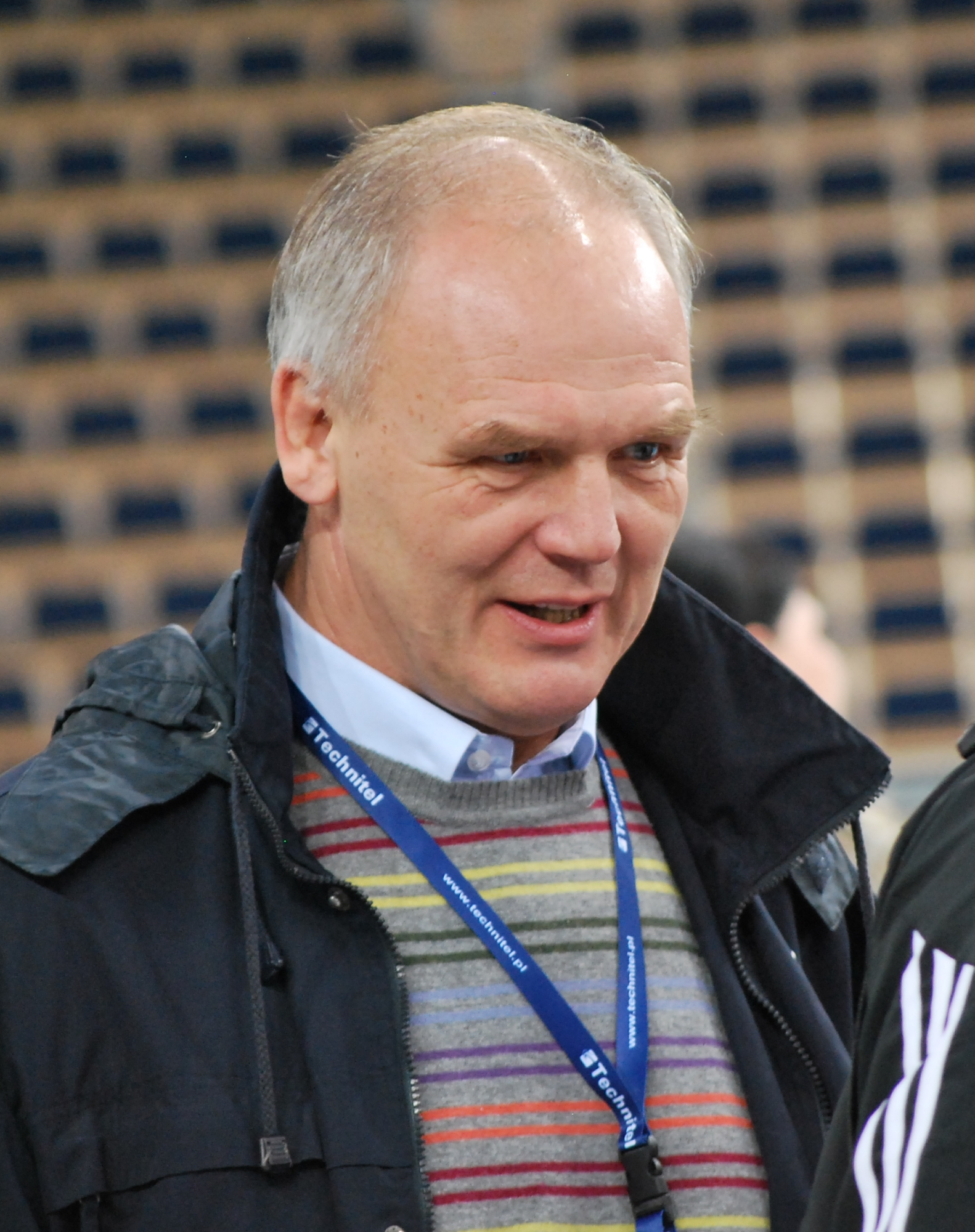
- Alojzy Świderek in 2012

Personal information
- Nationality: Polish
- Born: 30 May 1952 (age 72); Łódź, Poland

Sport
- Sport: Volleyball

Alojzy Świderek (born 30 May 1952) is a Polish volleyball player. He competed in the men's tournament at the 1972 Summer Olympics.
