= Ivan Ćosić (footballer) =

Croatian-German footballer

Personal information
- Date of birth: 13 October 1989 (age 37)
- Place of birth: Reutlingen, West Germany
- Height: 1.85 m (6 ft 1 in)
- Position: Defender

Youth career
- 1995–2003: SSV Reutlingen
- 2003–2007: VfB Stuttgart
- 2007–2008: Stuttgarter Kickers

Senior career*
Years	Team	Apps	(Gls)
2008–2010	SSV Reutlingen	35	(0)
2010–2011	Bayern Munich II	4	(0)
2011–2012	Eintracht Frankfurt II	11	(0)
2012	Maccabi Netanya	7	(0)
2014–2015	SSV Reutlingen	1	(0)
Total		58	(0)

International career
2007	Croatia U-18	2	(0)
2007	Croatia U-19	1	(0)
- * Club domestic league appearances and goals

Ivan Ćosić (born 13 October 1989) is a Croatian-German former professional footballer who played as a defender.

== Career ==
Born in Reutlingen, Ćosić began his career with his hometown club, SSV Reutlingen 05, before moving to Stuttgart to have spells in the youth teams of both VfB and Kickers. He returned to Reutlingen in 2008, where he made his breakthrough, making 35 appearances in two seasons in the Regionalliga Süd. In 2010, he joined Bayern Munich II, but was due to injuries he was unable to make his debut until February 2011, when he replaced Christian Saba at half-time in a 2–0 defeat against Eintracht Braunschweig. He made a further three substitute appearances before the end of the season, as the club were relegated from the 3. Liga, and he was subsequently released by the club, signing for Eintracht Frankfurt II. He was released by Frankfurt six months later and signed for Maccabi Netanya.
