= 2023 Men's European Volleyball League =

2023 Men's European Golden League
Tournament details
- Host country: Croatia
- Dates: 27 May – 25 June
- Teams: 12

Final positions
- Champions: Turkey (3rd title)
- Runners-up: Ukraine
- Third place: Croatia
- Fourth place: Czech Republic

Tournament awards
- MVP: (Turkey) Kaan Gürbüz

Tournament statistics
- Matches played: 40
- Attendance: 63,581 (1,590 per match)

2023 Men's European Volleyball League
- Dates: 27 May – 9 July
- Teams: 6
- Runners-up: Hungary

Tournament statistics
- Matches played: 18
- Attendance: 12,820 (712 per match)

The 2023 Men's European Volleyball League was the 19th edition of the annual Men's European Volleyball League, which featured men's national volleyball teams from 18 European countries.

The tournament had two divisions: the Golden League, which features twelve teams, and the Silver League with six teams.

Due to the lack of organizer for the Final Four Tournament of the Silver League, the final phase consisted of semi-finals and finals played as home & away matches.

== Pools composition ==
Teams were seeded following the serpentine system according to their CEV European Ranking as of 12 September 2022.

=== Golden League ===
Pool A	Pool B	Pool C
Turkey (9)	Ukraine (10)	Finland (12)
Portugal (15)	Belgium (14)	Czech Republic (13)
Romania (16)	Croatia (17)	Slovakia (22)
Denmark (26)	North Macedonia (25)	Estonia (24)

=== Silver League ===
Pool A	Pool B
Latvia (29)	Austria (30)
Cyprus (37)	Hungary (33)
Faroe Islands (39)	Georgia (40)

== Pool standing procedure ==
1. Total number of victories (matches won, matches lost)
2. In the event of a tie, the following first tiebreaker will apply: The teams will be ranked by the most point gained per match as follows:
  - Match won 3–0 or 3–1: 3 points for the winner, 0 points for the loser
  - Match won 3–2: 2 points for the winner, 1 point for the loser
  - Match forfeited: 3 points for the winner, 0 points (0–25, 0–25, 0–25) for the loser
3. If teams are still tied after examining the number of victories and points gained, then the FIVB will examine the results in order to break the tie in the following order:
  - Set quotient: if two or more teams are tied on the number of points gained, they will be ranked by the quotient resulting from the division of the number of all set won by the number of all sets lost.
  - Points quotient: if the tie persists based on the set quotient, the teams will be ranked by the quotient resulting from the division of all points scored by the total of points lost during all sets.
  - If the tie persists based on the point quotient, the tie will be broken based on the team that won the match of the Round Robin Phase between the tied teams. When the tie in point quotient is between three or more teams, these teams ranked taking into consideration only the matches involving the teams in question.

== League round ==
- All times are local.

=== Golden League ===
==== Pool A ====
Pos	Team	Pld	W	L	Pts	SW	SL	SR	SPW	SPL	SPR	Qualification
1	Turkey	6	5	1	14	17	9	1.889	598	534	1.120	Golden league Final round
2	Portugal	6	3	3	9	13	11	1.182	534	535	0.998	
3	Romania	6	2	4	7	10	15	0.667	522	575	0.908	
4	Denmark	6	2	4	6	8	13	0.615	468	478	0.979	

Date	Time		Score		Set 1	Set 2	Set 3	Set 4	Set 5	Total	Report
27 May	17:00	Portugal	3–0	Romania	25–22	25–21	25–20			75–63	Report
27 May	19:00	Denmark	0–3	Turkey	18–25	21–25	15–25			54–75	Report
31 May	19:00	Denmark	3–0	Romania	25–19	25–23	25–16			75–58	Report
31 May	20:00	Portugal	2–3	Turkey	23–25	25–21	23–25	25–22	15–17	111–110	Report
3 Jun	19:00	Denmark	3–1	Portugal	25–16	23–25	25–14	25–16		98–71	Report
4 Jun	17:00	Turkey	2–3	Romania	25–14	21–25	25–20	22–25	12–15	105–99	Report
10 Jun	17:00	Romania	2–3	Turkey	18–25	25–23	27–25	19–25	6–15	95–113	Report
10 Jun	19:00	Portugal	3–0	Denmark	26–24	25–22	25–14			76–60	Report
14 Jun	17:00	Romania	3–1	Denmark	29–27	22–25	25–21	25–19		101–92	Report
14 Jun	19:00	Turkey	3–1	Portugal	23–25	25–20	25–21	25–20		98–86	Report
17 Jun	17:00	Turkey	3–1	Denmark	21–25	25–21	26–24	25–19		97–89	Report
18 Jun	17:00	Romania	2–3	Portugal	25–27	25–22	16–25	28–26	12–15	106–115	Report

==== Pool B ====
Pos	Team	Pld	W	L	Pts	SW	SL	SR	SPW	SPL	SPR	Qualification
1	Ukraine	6	6	0	18	18	0	MAX	451	348	1.296	Golden league Final round
2	Belgium	6	2	4	6	8	13	0.615	467	498	0.938	
3	Croatia (Note: Qualified as hosts) (H)	6	2	4	6	9	15	0.600	509	556	0.915	Golden league Final round
4	North Macedonia	6	2	4	6	8	15	0.533	503	528	0.953	

(H) Host
Notes:

Date	Time		Score		Set 1	Set 2	Set 3	Set 4	Set 5	Total	Report
27 May	17:00	Belgium	3–1	Croatia	25–17	25–21	23–25	25–23		98–86	Report
27 May	19:00	Ukraine	3–0	North Macedonia	25–21	25–22	25–11			75–54	Report
31 May	19:00	Ukraine	3–0	Croatia	25–19	25–18	25–19			75–56	Report
31 May	20:15	North Macedonia	3–1	Belgium	25–21	25–23	17–25	25–21		92–90	Report
3 Jun	20:00	Belgium	0–3	Ukraine	21–25	21–25	23–25			65–75	Report
3 Jun	20:15	North Macedonia	3–2	Croatia	25–17	25–22	22–25	29–31	16–14	117–109	Report
10 Jun	19:00	Belgium	3–0	North Macedonia	27–25	25–23	26–24			78–72	Report
11 Jun	20:00	Croatia	0–3	Ukraine	17–25	21–25	22–25			60–75	Report
14 Jun	19:00	Ukraine	3–0	Belgium	25–21	25–14	25–13			75–48	Report
14 Jun	20:00	Croatia	3–2	North Macedonia	20–25	25–17	25–23	15–25	15–13	100–103	Report
18 Jun	20:00	Croatia	3–1	Belgium	25–22	25–20	23–25	25–21		98–88	Report
18 Jun	20:15	North Macedonia	0–3	Ukraine	18–25	24–26	23–25			65–76	Report

==== Pool C ====
Pos	Team	Pld	W	L	Pts	SW	SL	SR	SPW	SPL	SPR	Qualification
1	Czech Republic	6	5	1	14	15	7	2.143	513	462	1.110	Golden league Final round
2	Finland	6	3	3	9	11	12	0.917	512	494	1.036	
3	Estonia	6	3	3	8	11	11	1.000	477	497	0.960	
4	Slovakia	6	1	5	5	8	15	0.533	485	534	0.908	

Date	Time		Score		Set 1	Set 2	Set 3	Set 4	Set 5	Total	Report
27 May	16:00	Czech Republic	3–1	Slovakia	24–26	25–20	25–19	25–17		99–82	Report
27 May	21:00	Estonia	0–3	Finland	17–25	16–25	15–25			48–75	Report
31 May	19:00	Czech Republic	3–2	Finland	16–25	25–22	25–23	23–25	16–14	105–109	Report
31 May	20:00	Estonia	3–0	Slovakia	25–17	25–21	25–20			75–58	Report
3 Jun	19:00	Czech Republic	3–1	Estonia	23–25	25–16	25–16	25–22		98–79	Report
4 Jun	14:00	Finland	3–2	Slovakia	24–26	25–17	25–17	20–25	19–17	113–102	Report
10 Jun	18:00	Slovakia	3–0	Finland	25–23	25–16	25–22			75–61	Report
10 Jun	19:00	Estonia	3–0	Czech Republic	25–15	26–24	25–21			76–60	Report
14 Jun	17:00	Slovakia	2–3	Estonia	25–20	25–21	20–25	20–25	17–19	107–110	Report
14 Jun	18:10	Finland	0–3	Czech Republic	17–25	21–25	17–25			55–75	Report
17 Jun	16:00	Slovakia	0–3	Czech Republic	19–25	24–26	18–25			61–76	Report
17 Jun	20:10	Finland	3–1	Estonia	24–26	25–22	25–23	25–18		99–89	Report

=== Silver League ===
==== Pool A ====
Pos	Team	Pld	W	L	Pts	SW	SL	SR	SPW	SPL	SPR	Qualification
1	Latvia	4	4	0	12	12	0	MAX	300	182	1.648	Silver league Final round
2	Cyprus	4	2	2	6	6	6	1.000	247	255	0.969	Silver league Final round
3	Faroe Islands	4	0	4	0	0	12	0.000	190	300	0.633	

Date	Time		Score		Set 1	Set 2	Set 3	Set 4	Set 5	Total	Report
29 May	18:00	Faroe Islands	0–3	Cyprus	22–25	15–25	19–25			56–75	Report
30 May	19:00	Cyprus	3–0	Faroe Islands	25–19	25–15	25–15			75–49	Report
4 Jun	19:00	Faroe Islands	0–3	Latvia	17–25	16–25	16–25			49–75	Report
10 Jun	19:00	Latvia	3–0	Faroe Islands	25–11	25–15	25–10			75–36	Report
13 Jun	19:40	Cyprus	0–3	Latvia	17–25	17–25	14–25			48–75	Report
14 Jun	20:00	Latvia	3–0	Cyprus	25–17	25–17	25–15			75–49	Report

==== Pool B ====
Pos	Team	Pld	W	L	Pts	SW	SL	SR	SPW	SPL	SPR	Qualification
1	Hungary	4	4	0	11	12	2	6.000	338	265	1.275	Silver league Final round
2	Austria	4	2	2	7	8	6	1.333	318	281	1.132	Silver league Final round
3	Georgia	4	0	4	0	0	12	0.000	190	300	0.633	

Date	Time		Score		Set 1	Set 2	Set 3	Set 4	Set 5	Total	Report
27 May	16:00	Hungary	3–0	Georgia	25–11	25–13	25–15			75–39	Report
31 May	17:00	Georgia	0–3	Austria	16–25	17–25	15–25			48–75	Report
3 Jun	17:30	Austria	2–3	Hungary	25–21	19–25	17–25	29–27	13–15	103–113	Report
10 Jun	16:00	Hungary	3–0	Austria	25–20	25–23	25–22			75–65	Report
14 Jun	17:00	Austria	3–0	Georgia	25–10	25–23	25–12			75–45	Report
17 Jun	19:00	Georgia	0–3	Hungary	21–25	21–25	16–25			58–75	Report

== Final round ==
- All times are local.

=== Golden League ===
Semifinals
24 June
Turkey	3
Czech Republic	2
24 June
Croatia	1
Ukraine	3

Final
25 June
Turkey	3
Ukraine	2
3rd place match
25 June
Czech Republic	0
Croatia	3

==== Semifinals ====
Date	Time		Score		Set 1	Set 2	Set 3	Set 4	Set 5	Total	Report
24 Jun	17:00	Turkey	3–2	Czech Republic	22–25	25–17	19–25	25–23	15–12	106–102	Report
24 Jun	20:00	Croatia	1–3	Ukraine	23–25	25–21	21–25	12–25		81–96	Report

==== Third-place match ====
Date	Time		Score		Set 1	Set 2	Set 3	Set 4	Set 5	Total	Report
25 Jun	17:00	Czech Republic	0–3	Croatia	23–25	18–25	20–25			61–75	Report

==== Final ====
Date	Time		Score		Set 1	Set 2	Set 3	Set 4	Set 5	Total	Report
25 Jun	20:00	Turkey	3–2	Ukraine	14–25	25–22	26–24	22–25	15–6	102–102	Report

=== Silver League ===
Semifinals
Cyprus	3	1
Hungary *(Golden set)	1	3
Austria	0	0
Latvia	3	3

Final
Hungary	1	0
Latvia	3	3

==== Semifinals ====
Date	Time		Score		Set 1	Set 2	Set 3	Set 4	Set 5	Total	Report
24 Jun	17:35	Austria	0–3	Latvia	19–25	19–25	19–25			57–75	Report
28 Jun	20:00	Cyprus	3–1	Hungary	25–22	22–25	25–23	25–21		97–91	Report
28 Jun	19:40	Latvia	3–0	Austria	25–19	25–21	25–23			75–63	Report
1 Jul	18:00	Hungary	3–1	Cyprus	25–13	25–16	25–27	25–16		100–72	Report
Golden set		Hungary	15–12	Cyprus							

==== Final ====
Date	Time		Score		Set 1	Set 2	Set 3	Set 4	Set 5	Total	Report
6 Jul	17:00	Hungary	1–3	Latvia	25–17	10–25	21–25	11–25		67–92	Report
9 Jul	17:00	Latvia	3–0	Hungary	25–21	25–16	25–18			75–55	Report

== Final standing ==
Rank	Team
1st place, gold medalist(s)	Turkey
2nd place, silver medalist(s)	Ukraine
3rd place, bronze medalist(s)	Croatia
4	Czech Republic
5	Portugal
6	Finland
7	Belgium
8	Estonia
9	Romania
10	Denmark
11	North Macedonia
12	Slovakia
13	Latvia
14	Hungary
15	Austria
15	Cyprus
17	Faroe Islands
18	Georgia

Qualified for the 2023 Challenger Cup

2023 European League champions

Turkey
3rd title

14-man Roster for Golden League Final Round
Kaan Gürbüz, Burak Güngör, Arda Bostan, Bedirhan Bülbül, Mirza Lagumdžija, Arslan Ekşi, Yiğit Gülmezoğlu, Adis Lagumdžija, Faik Samed Güneş, Mert Matić, Berkay Bayraktar, Efe Bayram, Ahmet Tümer, Volkan Döne
Head coach
Alberto Giuliani

== Awards ==
- Most Valuable Player
  (Turkey) Kaan Gürbüz

== See also ==
- 2023 Women's European Volleyball League
