= Martin Sopko =

Slovak volleyball player (born 1982)

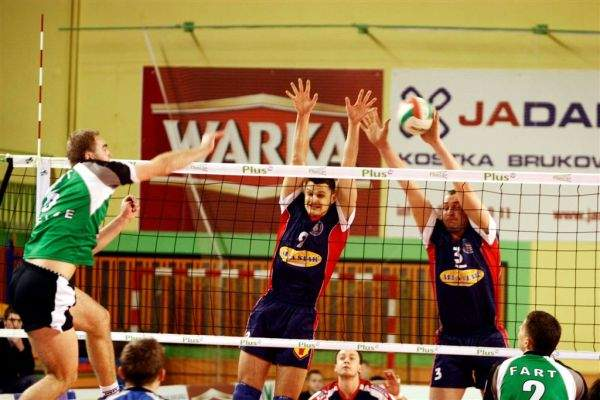
- Martin Sopko 2008.jpeg

Personal information
- Nationality: Slovak
- Born: 30 January 1982 (age 44)
- Height: 195 cm (6 ft 5 in)
- Weight: 90 kg (198 lb)
- Spike: 354 cm (139 in)
- Block: 330 cm (130 in)

Volleyball information
- Number: 4 (national team)

Career
Years	Teams
2015	[[VK Mirad UNIPO Prešov

National team
2015	Slovakia

Martin Sopko (born 30 January 1982) is a Slovak male volleyball player. He is part of the Slovakia men's national volleyball team. On club level he plays for Mirad Presov.
