= Tomislav Čošković =

Croatian volleyball player (born 1979)

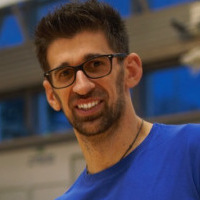

Personal information
- Full name: Tomislav Čošković
- Born: 22 April 1979 (age 47); SR Bosnia and Herzegovina, SFR Yugoslavia
- Height: 1.99 m (6 ft 6 in)
- Weight: 93 kg (205 lb)

Volleyball information
- Position: Outside Hitter
- Current club: (Turkey) Galatasaray
- Number: 12

National team
2005-10; 2010-	Croatia; Turkey

Tomislav Čošković (born 22 April 1979) is a Bosnian-born Croatian and Turkish volleyball player. He is 199 cm. He plays for Galatasaray as outside hitter since 2012 season start and wear 12 number.

On 16 July 2010, it was announced that Turkish President Abdullah Gül signed Čošković's Turkish citizenship papers and he has Turkish citizenship. He will play for Turkey if FIVB will let him play.

He is currently an assistant coach to the Croatia men's national volleyball team and co-leading volleyball camp for ProVolley with Tamara Sušić.

== Past career ==
- 2000–2001 (Italy) Palermo
- 2001–2002 (Austria) Hypo Tirol Innsbruck
- 2002–2004 (France) Rennes Étudiants Club
- 2004–2005 (France) Tourcoing Lille Métropole
- 2005–2006 (Greece) Olympiacos SC
- 2006–2007 (Russia) Lokomotiv Novosibirsk
- 2007–2012 (Turkey) Fenerbahçe SK
- 2012–present (Turkey) Galatasaray SK

== Honours and awards ==
- 2007-08 Turkish Men's Volleyball League Champion
- 2008-09 Turkish Men's Volleyball League runner-up
- 2009-10 Turkish Men's Volleyball League Champion
- 2010-11 Turkish Men's Volleyball League Champion
- 2008-09 Turkish Cup Champion
- 2009-10 Balkan Champion
