= Igor Omrčen =

Croatian volleyball player (born 1980)

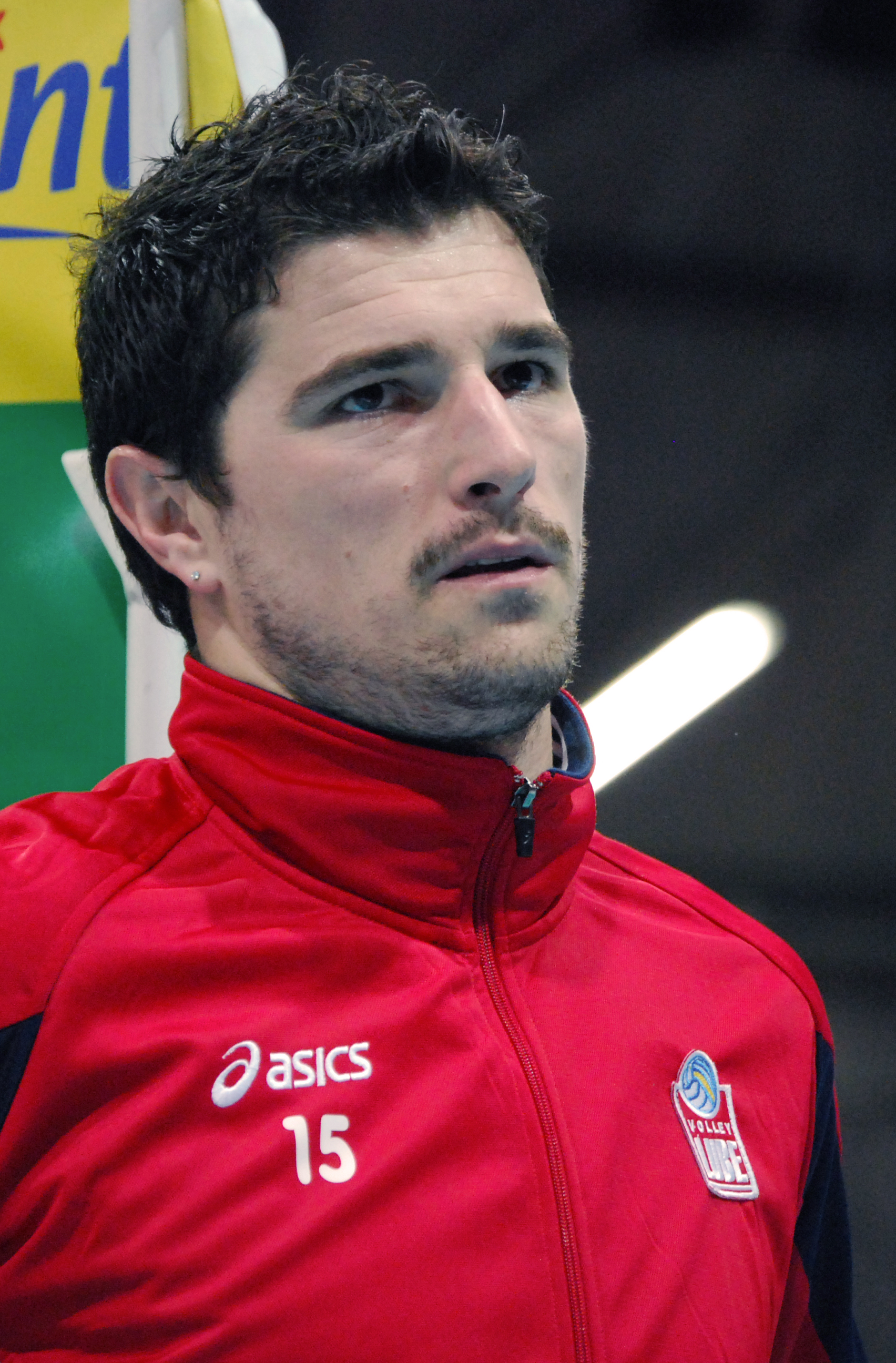
- Omrčen in 2011

Personal information
- Born: 26 September 1980 (age 46); Split, Croatia
- Height: 208 cm (6 ft 10 in)
- Weight: 95 kg (209 lb)
- Spike: 359 cm (141 in)
- Block: 340 cm (134 in)

Igor Omrčen (born 26 September 1980) is a retired volleyball player from Croatia. He twice became top scorer at the Men's European Volleyball League: in 2004 and 2006. Omrčen played as a professional in Italy for 12 years. In 2019, Omrčen ended his career playing in Japan's V.League for Toyoda Gosei Trefuerza.

Omrčen has been described as the greatest Croatian volleyball player of all time.
