= Ivan Ćosić (volleyball) =

Croatian volleyball player (born 1984)

Personal information
- Nickname: Ćoso
- Nationality: Croatian
- Born: 21 February 1984 (age 42); Livno, SR Bosnia and Herzegovina
- Hometown: Kaštela, Croatia
- Height: 202 cm (80 in)
- Weight: 100 kg (220 lb)
- Spike: 330 cm (130 in)
- Block: 343 cm (135 in)

Volleyball information
- Position: middle blocker

Career
Years	Teams
2005–2007	(Croatia) OK Karlovac
2007–2012	(Croatia) OK Mladost Marina Kaštela
2012–2014	(France) Cambrai VEC
2014–2015	(Romania) Arcada Galaţi
2015–2017	(Croatia) OK Mladost Marina Kaštela

National team
2002–2017	Croatia

Ivan Ćosić (born 21 February 1984 in Livno) is a Croatian male volleyball player. He spent most of his career with OK Mladost Marina Kaštela, with whom he won the 2011/12 and 2015/16 national championships. He also played for French Cambrai and Romanian Arcada Galaţi between 2012 and 2015.

Ćosić played with the Croatia men's national volleyball team between 2002 and 2017, participating in eight European Volleyball Championships with them.
