= Russian Volleyball Federation =

Volleyball federation of Russia

- Sport: Volleyball; Beach volleyball
- Jurisdiction: Russia
- Abbreviation: RVF (ВФВ)
- Founded: 1991
- Affiliation: FIVB
- Affiliation date: 1991
- Headquarters: Moscow
- Location: Russia

Official website
- www.volley.ru
- (Russia)

The Russian Volleyball Federation (Russian: Всероссийская федерация волейбола, romanized: Vserossiyskaya federatsiya voleybola; abbreviated as VFV, Russian: ВФВ) is the governing body of volleyball in Russia; although existing since 1991, it is the prosecutor of the pre-existing Soviet volleyball federation (Федерация волейбола СССР, Federacija Volejbola SSSR).

It organizes the men's and women's volleyball championships in Russia as well as the activities of the men's and women's national teams of Russia.

In response to the 2022 Russian invasion of Ukraine, the International Volleyball Federation suspended all Russian national teams, clubs, and officials, as well as beach and snow volleyball athletes, from all events, and stripped Russia of the right to host the 2022 FIVB Volleyball Men's World Championship in August 2022, and will relocate games that were to be in Russia in June and July. The European Volleyball Confederation (CEV) also banned all Russian national teams, clubs, and officials from participating in European competition, and suspended all members of Russia from their respective functions in CEV organs. It also canceled all competitions in Russia.

== History (Russia and Soviet Union) ==
Volleyball appeared in Russia in 1914 in Kazan and Nizhny Novgorod, where it was promoted by American instructors. In 1915, they got acquainted with volleyball in Khabarovsk and Vladivostok.

The official date of birth of Soviet volleyball is considered to be July 28, 1923, when a match between the men's teams of the Higher Art and Theater Workshops (VKHUTEMAS) and the State School of Cinematography (VKHUTEMAS) took place in Moscow with official arbitration. From the mid-1920s, volleyball teams began to appear in Kharkov, Baku, Tbilisi, Grozny, and Leningrad.

Since 1927, official competitions for the city championship began to be held in Moscow.

Of importance for the further development of volleyball in the USSR was its inclusion in the program of the 1928 All-Union Spartakiad. Preparation for these competitions took place throughout the country. Qualifying tournaments were held in Moscow, Kharkov, and Tbilisi. The main competitions took place in Moscow. The Ukrainian team won the men's tournament, the Moscow team won the women's tournament.

After the All-Union Spartakiad, the popularity of volleyball began to grow rapidly. In volleyball centers such as Moscow, Leningrad, Kharkov, the number of teams ran into many dozens. The geography of the game has also expanded significantly. Sections and teams began to appear in many cities of Russia, Ukraine, Belarus, Transcaucasia, and Central Asia. Tournaments were held between the national teams of the cities and many exhibition matches.

In 1932, the All-Union Volleyball Section (since 1959, the USSR Volleyball Federation) was formed as an independent structure within the VSFC. Alexander Abramovich Potashnik was elected its first president.

The popularity of volleyball in the country was growing. In April 1933, the All-Union Volleyball Festival was held in Dnepropetrovsk, involving teams from all volleyball centers in the country. The combined men's and women's teams from Moscow became the winners of the tournament. In terms of their importance, these competitions were already actually the USSR championship. Therefore, it is customary to calculate the serial numbers of the All-Union championships, beginning in 1933.

Since 1938, the USSR championships began to be held between club teams. The first winners of such competitions were "Spartak" (Leningrad) for men and "Spartak" (Moscow) for women.

In 1947, Soviet volleyball entered the international arena. In August in Prague (Czechoslovakia) at the 1st World Festival of Youth and Students, the men's team from Leningrad (reinforced by the volleyball players from Moscow) won a landslide victory in the tournament. In October of the same year, Dynamo Moscow (reinforced by players from other Moscow clubs) beat all their rivals during a tour of Poland.

In 1948, the All-Union Volleyball Section was admitted to the FIVB.

In September 1949, in Prague (Czechoslovakia), the USSR women's team competed in the First European Championship, and the men's team competed in the First World Championship. Both teams became winners of the competition.

In 1950, the first USSR Cup was held. The men's and women's teams of Dynamo (Moscow) became the owners of the new honorary trophy.

In October 1950, in Sofia (Bulgaria), the men's team competed for the first time in the European Championship and won it.

In August 1952 in Moscow, the USSR women's national team made its World Championship debut and became the winner of the competition.

In 1956, the 1st Summer Spartakiad of the Peoples of the USSR was held in Moscow, the winners of which the volleyball competitions were the Ukrainian men's national team and the Moscow women's team. These competitions were also the USSR championship. Volleyball was invariably present in all subsequent Spartakiads.

In 1960, the volleyball European Champions Cup was played for the first time between men's club teams, which was won by the CSKA team. A similar women's tournament was held in 1961 and the Soviet team Dynamo (Moscow) also became its winner.

In 1964, volleyball competitions were held in Tokyo (Japan) for the first time on the program of the Olympic Games. The USSR men's national team became the winner, and the women's team took second place.

A year later, for the first time in Poland, the World Cup was played between men's teams, which was won by the USSR team.

In 1966, the USSR national teams debuted at the European Championships among youth teams. Both the men's and women's teams became champions.

In 1973, for the first time, CEV held a cup competition for club teams, the winners of which were volleyball players from the Zvezda (Voroshilovgrad) team and athletes from CSKA.

In 1977, the USSR national teams made their debut at the World Junior Championships. The men's team became the champion.

In the 1990/1991 season, under the auspices of the USSR Volleyball Federation, the last USSR championship and the USSR Cup took place, and in the 1992 Olympics season, the already open championships were played. Russia for women's teams and the CIS for men.

In 1991, the All-Russian Volleyball Federation was formed. Valentin Vasilyevich Zhukov, who held this position until 2004, was elected president.

On October 1, 1992, the USSR Volleyball Federation ceased to be a member of the FIVB and CEV. The volleyball federations of Russia, Ukraine, Belarus, and other former Soviet republics became members of these international organizations.

=== Presidents of the USSR Volleyball Federation ===
1932-1949 — Potashnik, Alexander Abramovich
1949-1950 — Anikin, Alexander Sergeevich
1952-1967 — Savvin, Vladímir Ivánovich
1967-1969 — Baltadzhi, Vladímir Grigorievich
1970-1971 — Parfenov, Yuri Alexandrovich
1971-1975 — Savvin, Vladímir Ivánovich
1976-1980 — Shashkov, Nikolai Alexandrovich
1980-1989 — Torshilov, Yuri Vasilievich
1989-1992 — Shibaev, Gennady Nikolaevich

=== Presidents of the All-Russian Volleyball Federation ===
1991-2004 — Zhukov, Valentin Vasilievich
2004-2009 — Patrushev, Nikolái Platonovich
since 2010 — Shevchenko, Stanislav Vladímirovich (in 2009-2010 — acting president)

== Structure ==
The supreme body of the All-Russian Volleyball Federation is the Conference, which can have the status of report and election (which is held once every 4 years for the election of the leadership of the federation) and extraordinary (to resolve other issues). The last 13th information and election conference was held in December 2008 in Moscow.

In order to resolve the tasks set by the Conference for the RVF, as well as the statutory requirements, the conference delegates elect the Presidium for a period of 4 years. From among its members, the Presidium elects the Executive Committee, which implements the decisions of the Conference and the RVF Presidium and also organizes the day-to-day activities of the federation. Its work is headed by the President of the All-Russian Volleyball Federation, elected by the Conference for a term of 4 years. In addition to the President, the Executive Committee is made up of the RVF First Vice President, Vice Presidents, Secretary General, Director General, and other members.

To solve the special tasks facing the RVF, permanent technical commissions and councils have been created in its structure: an international commission, a commission for the logistics of competitions and the training process, a beach volleyball council, and a council of veterans. In addition, the structure of the VFV includes the All-Russian College of Judges and the Commission for Arbitration and Control and Audit elected at the conference.

The All-Russian Volleyball Federation includes 83 volleyball federations from Moscow, Saint Petersburg, Sevastopol, republics, territories, regions, and districts of the Russian Federation. In addition, 4 associations of regional volleyball federations (ARFV) have been formed: the Far East, Central Russia, Siberia, and the Urals.

=== List of regional volleyball federations included in the RVF structure ===
No.	Public Associations/Structural Units	Associations of regional volleyball federations
1	Volleyball Federation of the Republic of Adygea	
2	Volleyball Federation of the Republic of Altai	
3	Volleyball Federation of the Republic of Bashkortostan	Volga Volleyball Association
4	Volleyball Federation of the Republic of Buryatia	Association of Regional Volleyball Federations of Siberia
5	Volleyball Federation of the Republic of Dagestan	
6	Volleyball Federation of the Republic of Ingushetia	
7	Volleyball Federation of the Republic of Kabardino-Balkaria	
8	Volleyball Federation of the Republic of Karachay-Cherkessia	
9	Volleyball Federation of the Republic of Karelia	Northwest Volleyball Association
10	Volleyball Federation of the Republic of Komi	Northwest Volleyball Association
11	Volleyball Federation of the Republic of Crimea	
12	Volleyball Federation of the Republic of Mari El	Volga Volleyball Association
13	Volleyball Federation of the Republic of Mordovia	Volga Volleyball Association
14	Volleyball Federation of the Republic of Sakha	Association of Regional Volleyball Federations of the Far East
15	Volleyball Federation of the Republic of North Ossetia–Alania	
16	Volleyball Federation of the Republic of Tatarstan	Volga Volleyball Association
17	Volleyball Federation of the Republic of Tuva	
18	Volleyball Federation of the Republic of Udmurtia	Volga Volleyball Association
19	Volleyball Federation of the Republic of Khakassia	Association of Regional Volleyball Federations of Siberia
20	Volleyball Federation of the Republic of Chechnya	
21	Volleyball Federation of the Republic of Chuvashia	Volga Volleyball Association
22	Regional Volleyball Federation of Altai	Association of Regional Volleyball Federations of Siberia
23	Regional Volleyball Federation of Trans-Baikal	Association of Regional Volleyball Federations of the Far East
24	Regional Volleyball Federation of Kamchatka	Association of Regional Volleyball Federations of the Far East
25	Regional Volleyball Federation of Krasnodar	
26	Regional Volleyball Federation of Perm	Volga Volleyball Association
27	Regional Volleyball Federation of Primorsky	Association of Regional Volleyball Federations of the Far East
28	Regional Volleyball Federation of Stavropol	
29	Regional Volleyball Federation of Khabarovsk	Association of Regional Volleyball Federations of the Far East
30	Regional Volleyball Federation of Amur	Association of Regional Volleyball Federations of the Far East
31	Regional Volleyball Federation of Arkhangelsk	Northwest Volleyball Association
32	Regional Volleyball Federation of Astrakhan	
33	Regional Volleyball Federation of Belgorod	Association of Central Russian Regional Volleyball Federations
34	Regional Volleyball Federation of Briansk	Association of Central Russian Regional Volleyball Federations
35	Regional Volleyball Federation of Vladimir	Association of Central Russian Regional Volleyball Federations
36	Regional Volleyball Federation of Volgograd	Association of Central Russian Regional Volleyball Federations
37	Regional Volleyball Federation of Vologda	Northwest Volleyball Association
38	Regional Volleyball Federation of Voronezh	Association of Central Russian Regional Volleyball Federations
39	Regional Volleyball Federation of Ivanovo	Association of Central Russian Regional Volleyball Federations
40	Regional Volleyball Federation of Irkutsk	Association of Regional Volleyball Federations of Siberia
41	Regional Volleyball Federation of Kaliningrad	Northwest Volleyball Association
42	Regional Volleyball Federation of Kaluga	Association of Central Russian Regional Volleyball Federations
43	Regional Volleyball Federation of Kemerovo	Association of Regional Volleyball Federations of Siberia
44	Regional Volleyball Federation of Kirov	Volga Volleyball Association
45	Regional Volleyball Federation of Kostroma	Association of Central Russian Regional Volleyball Federations
46	Regional Volleyball Federation of Kurgan	Ural Association of Regional Volleyball Federations
47	Regional Volleyball Federation of Kursk	Association of Central Russian Regional Volleyball Federations
48	Regional Volleyball Federation of Leningrad	Northwest Volleyball Association
49	Regional Volleyball Federation of Lipetsk	Association of Central Russian Regional Volleyball Federations
50	Regional Volleyball Federation of Magadan	Association of Regional Volleyball Federations of the Far East
51	Regional Volleyball Federation of Moscow	Association of Central Russian Regional Volleyball Federations
52	Regional Volleyball Federation of Murmansk	Northwest Volleyball Association
53	Regional Volleyball Federation of Nizhny Novgorod	Volga Volleyball Association
54	Regional Volleyball Federation of Novgorod	Northwest Volleyball Association
55	Regional Volleyball Federation of Novosibirsk	Association of Regional Volleyball Federations of Siberia
56	Regional Volleyball Federation of Omsk	Association of Regional Volleyball Federations of Siberia
57	Regional Volleyball Federation of Oremburgo	Volga Volleyball Association
58	Regional Volleyball Federation of Penza	Volga Volleyball Association
59	Regional Volleyball Federation of Pskov	Northwest Volleyball Association
60	Regional Volleyball Federation of Rostov	Association of Central Russian Regional Volleyball Federations
61	Regional Volleyball Federation of Ryazan	Association of Central Russian Regional Volleyball Federations
62	Regional Volleyball Federation of Samara	Volga Volleyball Association
63	Regional Volleyball Federation of Saratov	Volga Volleyball Association
64	Regional Volleyball Federation of Sakhalin	Association of Regional Volleyball Federations of the Far East
65	Regional Volleyball Federation of Sverdlovsk	Ural Association of Regional Volleyball Federations
66	Regional Volleyball Federation of Smolensk	Association of Central Russian Regional Volleyball Federations
67	Regional Volleyball Federation of Tambov	Association of Central Russian Regional Volleyball Federations
68	Regional Volleyball Federation of Tver	Association of Central Russian Regional Volleyball Federations
69	Regional Volleyball Federation of Tomsk	Association of Regional Volleyball Federations of Siberia
70	Regional Volleyball Federation of Tula	Association of Central Russian Regional Volleyball Federations
71	Regional Volleyball Federation of Tyumen	Ural Association of Regional Volleyball Federations
72	Regional Volleyball Federation of Ulyanovsk	Volga Volleyball Association
73	Regional Volleyball Federation of Chelyabinsk	Ural Association of Regional Volleyball Federations
74	Regional Volleyball Federation of Yaroslavl	Association of Central Russian Regional Volleyball Federations
75	Volleyball Federation of Moscow	
76	Volleyball Federation of Saint Petersburg	
77	Volleyball Federation of Sevastopol	
78	Volleyball Federation of the Jewish Autonomous Oblast	Association of Regional Volleyball Federations of the Far East
79	Volleyball Federation of the Khanty-Mansi Autonomous Okrug	Ural Association of Regional Volleyball Federations
80	Volleyball Federation of the Yamalo-Nenets Autonomous Okrug	Ural Association of Regional Volleyball Federations
81	All-Russian Regional Volleyball Federation of Oryol	Association of Central Russian Regional Volleyball Federations
82	All-Russian Volleyball Federation of the Nenets Autonomous Okrug	
83	All-Russian Volleyball Federation of the Republic of Mari El	Volga Volleyball Association

== Leadership ==
=== Executive Committee ===
- Shevchenko, Stanislav Vladimirovich — President
- Gorbenko, Andrey Vladimirovich — CEO
- Karpol, Nikolai Vasilyevich — Vice president
- Shipulin, Gennady Yakovlevich — Vice president
- Yaremenko, Alexander Mikhailovich — General Secretary
- Patkin, Vladimir Leonidovich — Executive Director
- Zhukov, Valentin Vasilievich — President Adviser
- Titov, Sergey Valerievich — President of the All-Russian College of Judges
- Fadeev, Vladislav Valerievich — General Manager
- Yuriev, Yuri Nikolaevich — President of the Arbitration
- Trifonova, Zoya Alekseevna

== Sponsors ==
- VTB Bank is the sponsor of the RVF, the general sponsor of the Russia men's national volleyball team.
- VEB.RF is the sponsor of the RVF, the general sponsor of the Russia women's national volleyball team.

== Official tournaments ==
As part of its activities, the All-Russian Volleyball Federation is responsible for holding the following annual tournaments:

- Russian Championship — men and women
- Russian Cup — men and women
- Russian Super Cup — men and women
- Russian Championship — boys and girls
- All Russia competitions — veterans
- Beach Volley competitions

== See also ==
- Russia men's national volleyball team
- Russia women's national volleyball team
