= 2009–10 Russian Volleyball Super League =

19th official season of Russian Volleyball Super League

The Russian Volleyball Super League 2009–10 is the 19th official season of Russian Volleyball Super League.

The Championship is held in two phases. In the preliminary stage each team played each other twice - once at home and once away. The top eight teams went into the playoffs. Quarterfinals, semifinals and finals for first and third places were the best of five . Unlike the previous season there was no playoff for the fifth to eighth places. The teams placed ninth to twelfth competed against each other over another twelve games with the two bottom sides being relegated.

== Teams ==
Previous season 2008/09	Team	Town	Arena (capacity)	Website	Head Coach	Foreign players (max. 2)
1	VC Zenit-Kazan	Kazan	Basket-Hall Arena (7 000)	www.zenit-kazan.com	(Russia) Vladimir Alekno	(United States) Lloy Ball (United States) Clay Stanley
2	VC Iskra Odintsovo	Odintsovo	Volleyball Sportiv Complex (3 500)	iskra.vcmo.ru	(Russia) Sergei Tsvetnov	(Germany) Jochen Schöps (Brazil) Léo Mineiro
3	VC Fakel Novy Urengoy	Novy Urengoy	CSC Gazodobytchik (800)	www.fakelvolley.ru	(Russia) Boris Kolchin	(United States) Sean Rooney (United States) Kevin Hansen
4	VC Dynamo Moscow	Moscow	Dynamo Sports Palace (5 000)	www.vcdynamo.ru	(Russia) Yuri Cherednik	(Bulgaria) Teodor Salparov (Brazil) Dante Amaral
5	Lokomotiv-Belogorie	Belgorod	Sports Palace Cosmos (5 000)	www.belogorievolley.ru	(Russia) Gennadi Shipulin	(Poland) Łukasz Kadziewicz (Ukraine) Dmitri Storozhilov
6	VC Lokomotiv Novosibirsk	Novosibirsk	SKK Sever (2 500)	www.lokovolley.ru	(Russia) Andrei Voronkov	(United States) William Priddy (United States) David Lee
7	Ural Ufa	Ufa	SDK Dynamo (1 000)	www.volleyufa.ru	(Serbia) Zoran Gajić	(Serbia) Saša Starović (Hungary) Péter Veres
8	VC Gazprom-Yugra Surgut	Surgut	SC Tennis Center	www.gazprom-ugra.ru	(Russia) Rafael Habibullin	(Poland) Zbigniew Bartman
9	VC Yaroslavich Yaroslavl	Yaroslavl	SK Atlant	www.yarvolley.ru	(Russia) Sergei Shlyapnikov	(Serbia) Bojan Janić (Bulgaria) Metodi Ananiev
Promoted	VC Lokomotiv-Izumrud	Yekaterinburg	DIVS Uralochka (5 000)	www.loko-izumrud.ur.ru	(Russia) Valeri Alferov	(Bulgaria) Hristo Tsvetanov (Bulgaria) Todor Aleksiev
Promoted	VC Dynamo-Yantar Kaliningrad	Kaliningrad	SC Yunost	www.dinamoyantar.ru	(Russia) Yaroslav Antonov	(Argentina) Luciano De Cecco (Sweden) Marcus Nilsson
Replaced; Yugra-Samotlor	VC Tyumen	Tyumen	SC Tsentralny (1 440)	www.vctyumen.ru	(Russia) Yuri Korotkevich	(Ukraine) Vitali Kiktev (Ukraine) Sergei Shulga

== Regular season ==
Pos	Team	Pld	W	L	Pts	SW	SL	SR
1	Zenit-Kazan	22	18	4	52	60	26	2.308
2	Lokomotiv Belogorie	22	17	5	48	59	31	1.903
3	Lokomotiv Novosibirsk	22	14	8	48	55	30	1.833
4	Fakel Novy Urengoy	22	14	8	39	48	37	1.297
5	Dynamo Moscow	22	13	9	38	50	40	1.250
6	Iskra Odintsovo	22	13	9	37	46	38	1.211
7	Gazprom-Yugra Surgutsky district	22	10	12	30	40	47	0.851
8	Yaroslavich Yaroslavl	22	10	12	29	44	50	0.880
9	Ural Ufa	22	9	13	29	41	48	0.854
10	Dynamo-Yantar Kaliningrad	22	6	16	21	31	52	0.596
11	Lokomotiv-Izumrud Yekaterinburg	22	6	16	17	25	57	0.439
12	VC Tyumen	22	2	20	8	20	63	0.317

Home \ Away	ZKZ	BLG	NVS	FNU	DMO	ODN	GYS	YAR	URL	DYK	LIY	TYM
Zenit-Kazan		3–2	3–2	2–3	3–1	3–0	3–0	3–1	3–1	3–0	3–0	3–2
Lokomotiv Belogorie	3–2		3–2	3–2	3–2	3–0	3–0	3–1	3–2	3–0	3–0	3–0
Lokomotiv Novosibirsk	0–3	2–3		3–0	2–3	2–3	3–1	3–1	3–0	3–1	3–0	3–0
Fakel Novy Urengoy	0–3	3–0	3–1		1–3	1–3	3–2	1–3	0–3	3–1	3–0	3–0
Dynamo Moscow	3–1	1–3	0–3	1–3		3–2	3–2	2–3	3–1	3–2	1–3	3–0
Iskra Odintsovo	1–3	0–3	1–3	1–3	3–1		3–0	3–1	3–0	1–3	3–0	3–1
Gazprom-Yugra Surgutsky district	0–3	3–2	3–2	3–1	1–3	3–1		1–3	3–1	3–1	3–0	3–0
Yaroslavich Yaroslavl	3–1	0–3	1–3	2–3	1–3	0–3	2–3		3–2	3–2	3–0	3–2
Ural Ufa	0–3	3–2	1–3	2–3	0–3	2–3	3–2	3–2		3–0	3–1	3–0
Dynamo-Yantar Kaliningrad	2–3	0–3	0–3	0–3	3–2	0–3	3–0	1–3	1–3		2–3	3–0
Lokomotiv-Izumrud Yekaterinburg	1–3	2–3	0–3	0–3	0–3	2–3	3–1	3–2	3–2	0–3		1–3
VC Tyumen	1–3	3–2	0–3	1–3	0–3	1–3	1–3	2–3	1–3	1–3	1–3	
