= Dragan Travica =

Italian volleyball player (born 1986)

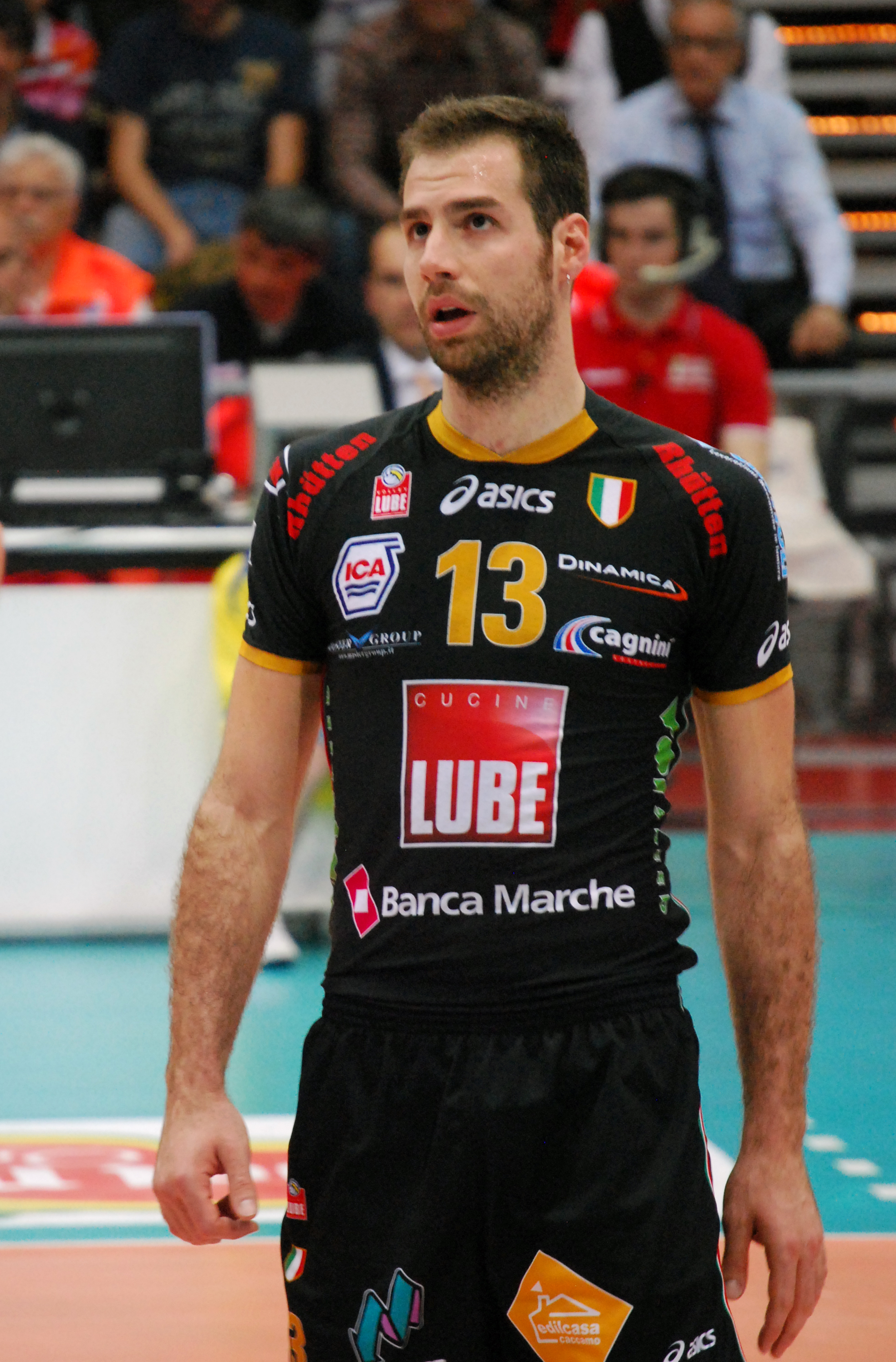

Personal information
- Nationality: Italian
- Born: 28 August 1986 (age 40); Zagreb, SR Croatia, SFR Yugoslavia
- Height: 2.00 m (6 ft 7 in)
- Weight: 94 kg (207 lb)
- Spike: 335 cm (132 in)
- Block: 320 cm (126 in)

Volleyball information
- Position: Setter
- Current club: (Italy) You Energy Volley
- Number: 14

Career
Years	Teams
2000–2002; 2002–2003; 2003–2005; 2005–2006; 2006–2008; 2008–2009; 2009–2011; 2011–2013; 2013–2015; 2015–2016; 2016–2017; 2017; 2017–2020; 2020–2022; 2022–2025; 2025–	(Italy) Volley Treviso (Italy) Pallavolo Falconara (Italy) Modena Volley (Italy) Pallavolo Reima Crema (Italy) Sparkling Volley Milan (Italy) Modena Volley (Italy) Pallavolo Gabeca (Italy) Volley Lube (Russia) Belogorie Belgorod (Turkey) Halkbank Ankara (Iran) Shahrdari Urmia (Italy) Modena Volley (Italy) Pallavolo Padova (Italy) Sir Safety Perugia (Greece) Olympiacos Piraeus (Italy) You Energy Volley

National team
2007–	Italy
Honours
Representing Italy
Men's volleyball
Olympic Games
Bronze medal – third place	2012 London
CEV European Championship
Silver medal – second place	2011 Austria/Czech Republic
Silver medal – second place	2013 Denmark/Poland
FIVB World League
Bronze medal – third place	2013 Mar del Plata
Bronze medal – third place	2014 Florence
- Last updated: 27 November 2025

Dragan Travica (born 28 August 1986) is an Italian volleyball player, former member of the Italy men's national volleyball team. On club level he plays for Olympiacos Piraeus, bronze medalist at the 2012 Olympic Games, silver medalist at the European Championship (2011, 2013), bronze medalist of the World League (2013, 2014) and Italian Champion (2012).

== Personal life ==
He was born in Zagreb, Croatia, the son of Serbian volleyball player and coach Ljubomir Travica, but he grew up in Italy, where his father played volleyball and later coached. His sister is married to another Italian volleyball player Cristian Savani.

== Career ==
He started his career with Sisley Treviso's youth team and, after one year with Sira Cucine Falconara, he debuted in the Serie A1 (Italy's top division) in 2004 with Kerakoll Modena. In 2005-2006 he played in the Serie A2 at Crema, obtaining the promotion to Serie A1 and winning the award as best Under-23 player in the category. The following year he again played in A2 in Milan, again obtaining the promotion and the A2 Italian Cup.

Travica debuted for Italy national team in 2007 at Forlì. He later played for Modena again and then for Monza, while in 2011-2013 he was a player of Lube Banca Macerata. Then he played for Russian club Belogorie Belgorod.

== Sporting achievements ==
- CEV Champions League
  - 2013/2014 – with Belogorie Belgorod
- Men's Club World Championship
  - 2014 – with Belogorie Belgorod
- CEV Challenge Cup
  - 2022/2023 – with Olympiacos Piraeus
- National championships
  - 2011/2012 Italian Championship, with Lube Banca Macerata
  - 2014/2015 Russian Championship, with Belogorie Belgorod
  - 2015/2016 Turkish Championship, with Halkbank Ankara
  - 2020/2021 Italian Championship, with Sir Safety Umbria
  - 2021/2022 Italian Championship, with Sir Safety Umbria
  - 2022/2023 Hellenic Championship, with Olympiacos Piraeus
  - 2023/2024 Hellenic Championship, with Olympiacos Piraeus
- National cups
  - 2012 Italian SuperCup, with Lube Banca Macerata
  - 2013 Russian Cup, with Belogorie Belgorod
  - 2013 Russian SuperCup, with Belogorie Belgorod
  - 2014 Russian SuperCup, with Belogorie Belgorod
  - 2015 Turkish SuperCup, with Halkbank Ankara
  - 2020 Italian SuperCup, with Sir Safety Umbria
  - 2022 Italian Cup, with Sir Safety Umbria
  - 2024 Hellenic Cup, with Olympiacos Piraeus
  - 2025 Hellenic League Cup, with Olympiacos Piraeus
  - 2024 Hellenic Super Cup, with Olympiacos Piraeus
  - 2025 Hellenic Cup, with Olympiacos Piraeus
- National team
  - 2011 CEV European Championship
  - 2012 Olympic Games
  - 2013 FIVB World League
  - 2013 CEV European Championship
  - 2014 FIVB World League

=== Individual awards ===
- 2011: CEV European Championship – Best setter
- 2023: CEV Challenge Cup – Most valuable player
- 2023: Hellenic Championship – Best setter
- 2024: Hellenic Super Cup - MVP

Awards
Preceded by (Poland) Paweł Zagumny	Best Setter of European Championship; 2011	Succeeded by (Russia) Sergey Grankin
