= 2008–09 Russian Volleyball Super League =

The Russian Volleyball Super League 2008/2009 is the 18th official season of Russian Volleyball Super League. In all there are 12 teams.

== Teams ==
Previous season 2007/2008	Team	Town	Arena (capacity)	Website	Head Coach	Foreign players (max. 2)
1	Dynamo	Moscow	Dynamo Sports Palace (5 000)	www.vcdynamo.ru	(Italy) Daniele Bagnoli	(Brazil) Dante Amaral (Argentina) Alexis Gonzalez
2	Iskra	Odintsovo	Volleyball Sportiv Complex (3 500)	iskravolley.com	(Serbia) Zoran Gajić	(Brazil) Giba (Germany) Jochen Schöps
3	Zenit	Kazan	Basket-Hall Arena (7 000)	www.zenit-kazan.com	(Russia) Vladimir Alekno	(United States) Lloy Ball (United States) Clay Stanley
4	Lokomotiv	Novosibirsk	SKK Sever (2 500)	www.lokovolley.ru	(Russia) Vladimir Babakin	(United States) William Priddy (Puerto Rico) Héctor Soto
5	Lokomotiv-Belogorie	Belgorod	Sports Palace Cosmos (5 000)	www.belogorievolley.ru	(Russia) Genadiy Shipulin	(Latvia) Guntars Celitans (Brazil) Alan Barbosa Domingos (United States) Richard Lambourne
6	Ural	Ufa	FOC Neftyanik Bashkortostana	www.volleyufa.ru	(Russia) Yuriy Marichev	(United States) Gabriel Gardner (Hungary) Péter Veres
7	Fakel	Novy Urengoy	CSC Gazodobytchik (800)	www.fakelvolley.ru	(Russia) Boris Kolchin	(United States) Sean Rooney (United States) Kevin Hansen
8	Gazprom-Yugra	Surgutsky district	SC Tennis Center	gazprom-ugra.ru	(Russia) Rafael Habibullin	(Hungary) Dömötör Mészáros (Slovenia) Sasa Gadnik (Germany) Christian Pampel (until September)
9	Yaroslavich	Yaroslavl	SK Atlant	www.yarvolley.ru	(Italy) Roberto Serniotti	(Canada) Dallas Soonias (Canada) Frederick Winters
10	Yugra-Samotlor	Niznevartovsk	SC Neftaynik (2000)	www.ugra-samotlor.ru	(Russia) Yuriy Korotkevich	(Ukraine) Sergey Shulga
Promoted	Nova	Novokuybyshevsk	SC Octan	www.novavolley.narod.ru	(Russia) Aleksandr Cherny	(Italy) Cristian Casoli (Bulgaria) Kostadin Stoykov
Promoted	Metalloinvest	Stary Oskol		www.belogorievolley.ru	(Russia) Andrey Ivanov	

== Regular season ==
Pos	Team	Pld	W	L	Pts	SW	SL	SR
1	Fakel Novyi Urengoi	22	18	4	49	58	30	1.933
2	Iskra Odintsovo	22	16	6	48	56	31	1.806
3	Dynamo Moscow	22	15	7	47	53	30	1.767
4	Zenit Kazan	22	13	9	41	49	35	1.400
5	Lokomotiv Belogorie	22	14	8	39	46	34	1.353
6	Ural Ufa	22	13	9	36	45	36	1.250
7	Lokomotiv Novosibirsk	22	11	11	36	47	39	1.205
8	Gazprom-Yugra Surgutsky district	22	7	15	24	31	51	0.608
9	Yugra-Samotlor Nizhnevartovsk	22	7	15	21	28	52	0.538
10	Yaroslavich Yaroslavl	22	8	14	19	34	54	0.630
11	NOVA Novokuybyshevsk	22	5	17	19	31	53	0.585
12	Metalloinvest Stary Oskol	22	5	17	17	23	56	0.411

== Classification 9–12 places ==
Pos	Team	Pld	W	L	Pts	SW	SL	SR
9	Yaroslavich Yaroslavl	34	17	17	46	65	57	1.140
10	Yugra-Samotlor Nizhnevartovsk	34	14	20	41	55	74	0.743
11	Metalloinvest Stary Oskol	34	10	24	34	45	78	0.577
12	NOVA Novokuybyshevsk	34	8	26	27	44	85	0.518

== Play-off ==
=== Quarterfinals ===
Fakel vs Gazprom-Yugra 2–1

Date		Score		Set 1	Set 2	Set 3	Set 4	Set 5	Total
25 Mar	Fakel Novyi Urengoi	3–1	Gazprom-Yugra Surgutsky district	21–25	31–29	25–20	25–19		102–93
29 Mar	Gazprom-Yugra Surgutsky district	3–1	Fakel Novyi Urengoi	27–29	25–19	25–23	25–21		102–92
9 Apr	Fakel Novyi Urengoi	3–1	Gazprom-Yugra Surgutsky district	25–22	25–13	19–25	25–23		94–83

Iskra vs Lokomotiv Novosibirsk 2–0

Date		Score		Set 1	Set 2	Set 3	Set 4	Set 5	Total
25 Mar	Iskra Odintsovo	3–1	Lokomotiv Novosibirsk	20–25	25–18	25–20	26–24		96–87
29 Mar	Lokomotiv Novosibirsk	0–3	Iskra Odintsovo	23–25	21–25	21–25			65–75

Dynamo vs Ural 2–0

Date		Score		Set 1	Set 2	Set 3	Set 4	Set 5	Total
25 Mar	Dynamo Moscow	3–1	Ural Ufa	25–21	25–23	23–25	26–24		99–93
29 Mar	Ural Ufa	2–3	Dynamo Moscow	25–21	21–25	25–21	21–25	9–15	101–107

Zenit vs Lokomotiv Belogorie 2–1

Date		Score		Set 1	Set 2	Set 3	Set 4	Set 5	Total
25 Mar	Zenit Kazan	3–2	Lokomotiv Belogorie	25–22	21–25	14–25	25–22	24–22	109–116
29 Mar	Lokomotiv Belogorie	3–0	Zenit Kazan	25–21	25–17	25–22			75–60
9 Apr	Zenit Kazan	3–0	Lokomotiv Belogorie	25–22	25–18	25–22			75–62

=== Semifinals ===
Fakel vs Zenit 1–3

Date		Score		Set 1	Set 2	Set 3	Set 4	Set 5	Total
13 Apr	Fakel Novyi Urengoi	2–3	Zenit Kazan	24–26	25–18	17–25	25–20	11–25	102–104
14 Apr	Fakel Novyi Urengoi	3–0	Zenit Kazan	25–18	25–23	38–36			88–77
18 Apr	Zenit Kazan	3–0	Fakel Novyi Urengoi	25–18	25–18	25–20			75–56
19 Apr	Zenit Kazan	3–1	Fakel Novyi Urengoi	25–23	25–18	19–25	25–23		94–89

Iskra vs Dynamo 3–2

Date		Score		Set 1	Set 2	Set 3	Set 4	Set 5	Total
13 Apr	Iskra Odintsovo	3–2	Dynamo Moscow	18–25	25–23	24–26	25–20	15–12	107–106
14 Apr	Iskra Odintsovo	1–3	Dynamo Moscow	25–17	26–28	21–25	15–25		87–95
18 Apr	Dynamo Moscow	3–1	Iskra Odintsovo	27–25	25–17	16–25	23–25		93–90
19 Apr	Dynamo Moscow	2–3	Iskra Odintsovo	24–26	25–20	24–26	25–14	15–17	113–103
23 Apr	Iskra Odintsovo	3–1	Dynamo Moscow	22–25	25–20	25–18	25–20		97–83

=== Classification 5–8 places ===
Lokomotiv Belogorie vs Gazprom-Yugra 3–0

Date		Score		Set 1	Set 2	Set 3	Set 4	Set 5	Total
13 Apr	Lokomotiv Belogorie	3–1	Gazprom-Yugra Surgutsky district	25–17	25–18	23–25	25–16		98–76
14 Apr	Lokomotiv Belogorie	3–2	Gazprom-Yugra Surgutsky district	21–25	24–26	25–18	25–17	21–19	116–105
18 Apr	Gazprom-Yugra Surgutsky district	1–3	Lokomotiv Belogorie	25–19	19–25	21–25	23–25		88–95

Ural vs Lokomotiv Novosibirsk 1–3

Date		Score		Set 1	Set 2	Set 3	Set 4	Set 5	Total
13 Apr	Ural Ufa	2–3	Lokomotiv Novosibirsk	25–22	25–23	23–25	17–25	13–25	103–110
14 Apr	Ural Ufa	3–2	Lokomotiv Novosibirsk	23–25	25–19	21–25	25–23	15–11	109–103
18 Apr	Lokomotiv Novosibirsk	3–1	Ural Ufa	20–25	25–21	25–14	25–14		95–74
19 Apr	Lokomotiv Novosibirsk	3–0	Ural Ufa	25–22	29–27	25–22	25–14		79–71

=== Finals ===
==== Final 5–6 places ====
Lokomotiv Belogorie vs Lokomotiv Novosibirsk 3–1

Date		Score		Set 1	Set 2	Set 3	Set 4	Set 5	Total
27 Apr	Lokomotiv Belogorie	3–1	Lokomotiv Novosibirsk	19–25	25–19	25–23	25–22		94–89
28 Apr	Lokomotiv Belogorie	3–1	Lokomotiv Novosibirsk	25–21	25–18	20–25	25–21		95–85
02 May	Lokomotiv Novosibirsk	3–1	Lokomotiv Belogorie	25–17	22–25	25–23	25–21		97–86
03 May	Lokomotiv Novosibirsk	0–3	Lokomotiv Belogorie	18–25	23–25	29–31			70–81

==== Bronze medal matches ====
Fakel vs Dynamo 3–0

Date		Score		Set 1	Set 2	Set 3	Set 4	Set 5	Total
27 Apr	Fakel Novyi Urengoi	3–2	Dynamo Moscow	25–20	25–23	20–25	28–30	16–14	114–112
28 Apr	Fakel Novyi Urengoi	3–2	Dynamo Moscow	22–25	25–15	23–25	25–17	15–8	110–90
02 May	Dynamo Moscow	2–3	Fakel Novyi Urengoi	19–25	25–21	21–25	25–20	13–15	103–106

==== Gold medal matches ====
Iskra vs Zenit 0–3

Date		Score		Set 1	Set 2	Set 3	Set 4	Set 5	Total
27 Apr	Iskra Odintsovo	0–3	Zenit Kazan	21–25	19–25	23–25			63–75
28 Apr	Iskra Odintsovo	2–3	Zenit Kazan	25–20	27–29	25–19	23–25	13–15	113–108
02 May	Zenit Kazan	3–1	Iskra Odintsovo	25–21	18–25	25–22	25–21		93–89

== Final standings ==
Rank	Team
1st place, gold medalist(s)	Zenit Kazan
2nd place, silver medalist(s)	Iskra Odintsovo
3rd place, bronze medalist(s)	Fakel Novyi Urengoi
4	Dynamo Moscow
5	Lokomotiv Belogorie
6	Lokomotiv Novosibirsk
7	Ural Ufa
8	Gazprom-Yugra Surgutsky district
9	Yaroslavich Yaroslavl
10	Yugra-Samotlor Nizhnevartovsk
11	Metalloinvest Stary Oskol
12	NOVA Novokuybyshevsk
