= Boriss Kolčins =

Russian and Latvian volleyball coach

Boriss Kolčins (Russian: Борис Николаевич Колчин; born 29 September 1957, Riga) is a Russian and Latvian volleyball coach.

== Career ==
Kolčins played for VC Radiotechnik.

He started his coaching career in Italy (А1, А2).

For a long time he was the head coach of Fakel Novy Urengoy (2005–2011), with whom he won the 2007 CEV Cup and the bronze medal of the Russian Volleyball Super League 2009, he also headed VC Belogorie (2015–16), WVC Dynamo Moscow (2011–12) and the Latvia men's national volleyball team. He was an assistant to Daniele Bagnoli in the Russian national team and was a member of the Belogorie coaching staff many times. In recent years, Kolčins has worked as an assistant to the head coach of the Latvian national team.

Boriss Kolčins returned to VC Dynamo Moscow midway through the 2017–18 season. 13 April 2021 again headed VC Belogorie
