= Soviet Men's Volleyball Cup =

Soviet Union Cup
- Sport: Volleyball
- Founded: 1950
- First season: 1950
- Folded: 1991
- Administrator: USRRV
- Country: Soviet Union
- Continent: Europe

The USSR Men's Volleyball Cup in ( Russian : Кубок СССР по волейболу среди мужчин ) was a competition of the USSR men's volleyball teams, and it was contested first from 1950 to 1953, then from 1972 to 1991. The competition did not take place during the 1975 and 1979 seasons .

== Cup editions ==
Years	Winners	Score	Runners-up
1950	Dynamo Moscow		SKA Leningrad
1951	Dynamo Moscow		Georgia
1952	Dynamo Moscow		CSKA Moscow
1953	CSKA Moscow		Spartak Kiev
1954-71	Not Played		
1972	MGTU Moscow		Lokomotiv Kiev
1973	Lokomotiv Kiev		SKA Rostov-na-Donu
1974	SKA Rostov-na-Donu		Dorozhnyk Odessa
1975	Not Played		
1976	CGC Odessa		SKA Rostov-na-Donu
1977	Promstroy Gomel		Lokomotiv Kiev
1978	Motor Minsk		Dynamo Moscow
1979	Not Played		
1980	CSKA Moscow		Vilnius
1981	MGTU Moscow		Motor Minsk
1982	CSKA Moscow		Lokomotiv Kharkiv
1983	Avtomobilist Leningrad		Radiotechnik Riga
1984	CSKA Moscow		
1985	CSKA Moscow		Dynamo Moscow
1986	Iskra Odintsovo		
1987	Iskra Odintsovo		
1988	Lokomotiv Kiev		Avtomobilist Leningrad
1989	Avtomobilist Leningrad		Lokomotiv Novosibirsk
1990	Lokomotiv Kiev		
1991	SKA Alma-Ata		

== See also ==
- Volleyball in Russia
- Russian Volleyball Cup
