= Daniele Bagnoli =

Italian volleyball coach (1953–2024)

Personal information
- Nickname: Daniele
- Born: 25 October 1953; Mantua, Italy
- Died: 27 December 2024 (aged 71)

Best results
Years	Result
2009	FIVB World League

Daniele Bagnoli
Medal record

Men's Volleyball

Representing Italy

Mediterranean Games
Gold medal – first place	1991 Athens	Team competition

Representing Russia

FIVB Volleyball World League
Silver medal – second place	2010 Córdoba	Team competition
Bronze medal – third place	2009 Belgrade	Team competition

Daniele Bagnoli (25 October 1953 – 27 December 2024) was an Italian volleyball coach.

As coach, Bagnoli was an eight-time Italian champion, seven-time Italian Cup winner, two-time Winner's Cup winner, five-time European Cup and League of Champions winner, five-time SuperCup of Italy winner and a two-time CEV Cup Winner.

From 2007, Bagnoli was the head coach of VC Dynamo Moscow, where he guided the team to titles in the Russian League, the Supercup and the Russian Cup in 2008. Bagnoli won five Champions cups in CEV Champions League as a coach, Modena (1995–96, 1996–97) and Treviso (1998–1999, 1999–2000, 2005–2006). Bagnoli was named Russian national team head coach 2009–10 and won silver medals at the 2010 FIVB Volleyball World League. He was in Asia from 2013 until 2015 and was a winner of the Asian Club Championship.

Bagnoli died on 27 December 2024, at the age of 71.

== Career ==
- Italy Pallavolo Mantova (1982–85)
- Italy Pallavolo Guidizzolo (1985–86)
- Italy Polisportiva Virgilio (1986–90)
- Italy Italy Assistant Coach (1990–92)
  - Mediterranean Games: 1991
- Italy Galileo Giovolley (1992–93)
- Italy Pallavolo Modena (1993–97)
  - European Super Cup: 1995
  - CEV Champions League: 1995–96, 1996–97
  - CEV Cup: 1994–95
  - Italian Volleyball League: 1994–95, 1996–97
  - Italian Cup: 1993–94, 1994–95, 1996–97
- Italy Roma Volley (1997–98)
- Italy Sisley Treviso (1998–00)
  - European Super Cup: 1999
  - CEV Champions League: 1998–99, 1999–00
  - Challenge Cup: 1997–98
  - Italian Volleyball League: 1997–98, 1998–99
  - Italian Cup: 1999–00
  - Italian Super Cup: 1998
- Italy Pallavolo Modena (2000–01)
- Italy Sisley Treviso (2001–07)
  - CEV Champions League: 2005–06
  - Challenge Cup: 2002–03
  - Italian Volleyball League: 2002–03, 2003–04, 2004–05, 2006–07
  - Italian Cup: 2003–2004, 2004–2005, 2006–2007
  - Italian Super Cup: 2001, 2003, 2004, 2005
- Russia Dynamo Moscow (2007–09)
  - Russian Volleyball Super League: 2008
- Russia Russia (2009–10).
- Italy Pallavolo Modena (2011–12)
- Turkey Fenerbahçe Grundig (2012–13)
- Iran Matin Varamin (2013–2014)
  - AVC Club Volleyball Championship: 2014
  - Iranian Volleyball Super League: 2014
- Qatar Al Rayan (2014–2015)
  - Qatari Volleyball League: 2015
- Tunisia CS Sfaxien (2016–2016)
- Italy Top Volley Latina (2016–2017)
- Russia Ural Ufa (2017–2018)
- Italy Volley Callipo (2019)
