= Russia women's national under-23 volleyball team =

Youth volleyball team representing Russia

Russia U23
- Association: Volleyball Federation Of Russia

Uniforms
| Home | Away |

FIVB U23 World Championship
- Appearances: None
- www.volley.ru (in Russian)

The Russia women's national under-23 volleyball team represents Russia in international women's volleyball competitions and friendly matches under the age 23 and it is ruled by the Russian Volleyball Federation That is an affiliate of International Volleyball Federation FIVB and also a part of European Volleyball Confederation CEV.

In response to the 2022 Russian invasion of Ukraine, the International Volleyball Federation suspended all Russian national teams, clubs, and officials, as well as beach and snow volleyball athletes, from all events. The European Volleyball Confederation (CEV) also banned all Russian national teams, clubs, and officials from participating in European competition, and suspended all members of Russia from their respective functions in CEV organs.

== Results ==
=== FIVB U23 World Championship ===
Champions Runners up Third place Fourth place

FIVB U23 World Championship
| Year | Round | Position | Pld | W | L | SW | SL | Squad |
|---|---|---|---|---|---|---|---|---|
| (Mexico) 2013 | Didn't Participate | | | | | | | |
| (Turkey) 2015 | Didn't Participate | | | | | | | |
| (Slovenia) 2017 | Didn't Participate | | | | | | | |
| Total | 0 Titles | 0/3 | | | | | | |
