= Dmytro Pashytskyy =

Ukrainian volleyball player

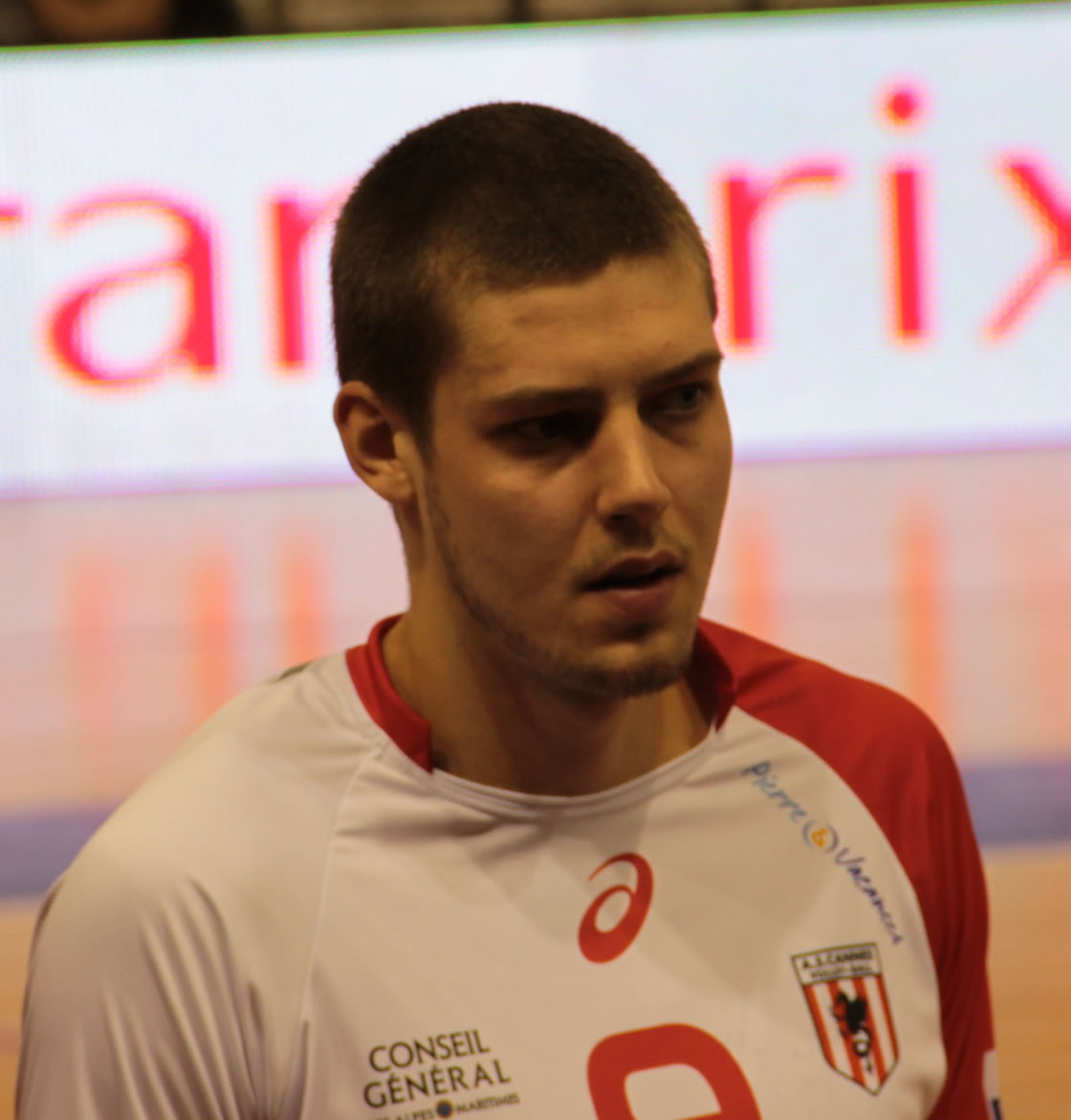

Personal information
- Nationality: Ukrainian; Russian
- Born: 29 November 1987 (age 38); Kyiv, Soviet Union, Ukraine
- Height: 2.05 m (6 ft 9 in)
- Weight: 100 kg (220 lb)
- Spike: 355 cm (140 in)
- Block: 335 cm (132 in)

Volleyball information
- Position: Middle blocker

Career
Years	Teams
2009–2010; 2010–2011; 2011–2014; 2014–2015; 2015–2016; 2016–2017; 2017–2020; 2020–2022; 2022; 2022–2024	Pärnu VK; Selver Tallinn; AS Cannes; Cuprum Lubin; Asseco Resovia; Trefl Gdańsk; Kuzbass Kemerovo; Zenit Saint Petersburg; Trefl Gdańsk; ZAKSA Kędzierzyn-Koźle

Dmytro Pashytskyy (Ukrainian: Дмитро Пашицький; born 29 November 1987) is a Ukrainian professional volleyball player.

== Personal life ==
Dmitry Pashitsky was born in Kyiv, but spent a significant part of his life in Riga (Latvia), where he began playing volleyball.

== Career ==
=== Club ===
Pashytskyy started his professional volleyball career in Pärnu VK in 2009. For the next season he joined another Estonian team, Selver Tallinn, with which he won the Estonian Championship, Estonian Cup and the Baltic League in 2011.

In 2011, Pashytskyy moved to France to join one of the most decorated volleyball clubs in French volleyball history, AS Cannes. In 2013, he received an award for the Best Middle Blocker of the 2012–13 season.

The 2014–15 season, Pashytskyy spent playing in the Polish PlusLiga team, Cuprum Lubin. Не became the best blocker of the 2014–15 PlusLiga season by setting a new league record of 116 blocks that still remains unbroken. Also, he became the best scorer of the team, which is extremely unusual for the middle blocker position.

In 2015, Pashytskyy joined Asseco Resovia, the 2015 Polish Champion, with which he won the 2015–16 PlusLiga silver medal and participated in the Final 4 of the 2015–16 CEV Champions League. For the 2016–17 season he was loaned to Lotos Trefl Gdańsk. During the time spent playing in the Polish PlusLiga he received individual MVP awards nine times.

In 2017, Pashytskyy signed a contract with Kuzbass Kemerovo, with which he won the Russian Champion title in 2019 and the SuperCup the same season. He also made it to the semifinals of 2018–19 CEV Cup. During the 2019–20 season he won a bronze medal in the Russian Super League and reached the semifinals of the 2019–20 CEV Champions League.

On 15 June 2020, Pashytskyy joined Zenit Saint Petersburg, with which he became a silver medalist of the Russian Super League in the season of 2020–21. In the same season, he also made it to the finals of both, the Russian Cup and the 2020–21 CEV Cup.

In the spring of 2022, Pashytskyy returned to Lotos Trefl Gdańsk and helped the team reach the play-off stage of the Polish PlusLiga.

For the 2022–23 PlusLiga season, Pashytskyy signed a contract with ZAKSA Kędzierzyn-Koźle, with which he won the Polish Cup in 2023.

== Honours ==
=== Club ===
- CEV Champions League
  - 2022–23 – with ZAKSA Kędzierzyn-Koźle
- CEV Cup
  - 2020–21 – with Zenit Saint Petersburg
- Baltic League
  - 2010–11 – with Selver Tallinn
- Domestic
  - 2010–11 Estonian Cup, with Selver Tallinn
  - 2010–11 Estonian Championship, with Selver Tallinn
  - 2015–16 Polish Championship, with Asseco Resovia
  - 2018–19 Russian Championship, with Kuzbass Kemerovo
  - 2019–20 Russian SuperCup, with Kuzbass Kemerovo
  - 2020–21 Russian Championship, with Zenit Saint Petersburg
  - 2022–23 Polish Cup, with ZAKSA Kędzierzyn-Koźle
  - 2023–24 Polish SuperCup, with ZAKSA Kędzierzyn-Koźle

=== Individual awards ===
- 2013: French Championship – Best middle blocker

=== Statistics ===
- 2014–15 PlusLiga – Best blocker (116 blocks)
