= VC Zenit Saint Petersburg =

Russian volleyball club

Zenit Saint Petersburg
- Full name: Volleyball Club "Zenit"
- Short name: VC Zenit SPb
- Founded: 2017
- Ground: KSK Arena, Saint Petersburg (Capacity: 7,120)
- Chairman: Vladimir Samsonov
- Manager: Viktor Sidelnikov (care-taker)
- Captain: Ivan Iakovlev
- League: Super League; CEV Champions League
- 2021/22: 4th place
- Website: Club home page

Uniforms
Home	Away

"Zenit" (Волейбольная команда «Зенит») is a Russian professional volleyball club based in Saint Petersburg.

The club is taking part in the Russian Superleague. The club's primary sponsor is Gazprom.

== Achievements ==
Domestic competitions

- Russian Championship
  Runners-up (2): 2018, 2021
- Russian Cup
  Runners-up (3): 2018, 2019, 2020
- Russian Super Cup
  Runners-up (2): 2018, 2021

International competitions

- CEV Cup
  Runner-up (1): 2021

== History ==
The VC Zenit was established in June 2017, as part of the FC Zenit. It played at the Super League for the first time in the 2017–18 season and finished fifth, and reached the Final game in playoff, against Zenit Kazan.

== Team roster ==
Team roster – season 2022/2023

No.	Name	Date of birth	Position
1	(Russia) Sergey Melkozerov	April 25, 1997 (age 28)	libero
3	(Russia) Dmitry Kovalëv	March 15, 1991 (age 34)	setter
4	(Russia) Igor Kobzar (C)	April 13, 1991 (age 34)	setter
5	(Russia) Egor Yakutin	January 27, 1997 (age 28)	middle blocker
8	(France) Jenia Grebennikov	August 13, 1990 (age 35)	libero
9	(Russia) Ivan Iakovlev	April 17, 1995 (age 30)	middle blocker
10	(Russia) Kirill Ursov	February 13, 1995 (age 30)	outside hitter
11	(Russia) Fedor Voronkov	December 10, 1995 (age 29)	outside hitter
12	(United States) Matt Anderson	August 18, 1987 (age 38)	outside hitter
13	(Russia) Maxim Kosmin	April 9, 1998 (age 27)	middle blocker
17	(Russia) Viktor Poletaev	July 27, 1995 (age 30)	opposite
18	(Russia) Egor Kliuka	June 15, 1995 (age 30)	outside hitter
Head coach: Andrey Tolochko

Team roster – season 2021/2022
VC Zenit St. Petersburg
No.	Name	Date of birth	Position
1	(Russia) Sergey Melkozerov	April 25, 1997 (age 28)	libero
2	(Russia) Kirill Ionov	October 31, 2001 (age 24)	middle blocker
4	(Russia) Igor Kobzar (C)	April 13, 1991 (age 34)	setter
7	(Russia) Igor Kolodinsky	July 7, 1983 (age 42)	setter
8	(France) Jenia Grebennikov	August 13, 1990 (age 35)	libero
9	(Russia) Ivan Iakovlev	April 17, 1995 (age 30)	middle blocker
10	(Russia) Kirill Ursov	February 13, 1995 (age 30)	outside hitter
11	(Russia) Fedor Voronkov	December 10, 1995 (age 29)	outside hitter
13	(Russia) Maxim Kosmin	April 9, 1998 (age 27)	middle blocker
14	(Russia) Ivan Podrebinkin	July 3, 1993 (age 32)	opposite
17	(Russia) Viktor Poletaev	July 27, 1995 (age 30)	opposite
18	(Russia) Egor Kliuka	June 15, 1995 (age 30)	outside hitter
19	(Ukraine) Dmytro Pashytskyy	November 29, 1987 (age 37)	middle blocker
21	(Slovenia) Tine Urnaut	September 3, 1988 (age 37)	outside hitter
Head coach: Tuomas Sammelvuo

Team roster – season 2020/2021
VC Zenit St. Petersburg
No.	Name	Date of birth	Position
1	(Russia) Sergey Melkozerov	April 25, 1997 (age 28)	libero
2	(Russia) Aleksandr Dyachkov	August 15, 1997 (age 28)	outside hitter
3	(Russia) Dmitry Kovalyov	March 15, 1991 (age 34)	setter
4	(Russia) Omar Kurbanov	February 23, 2000 (age 25)	outside hitter
6	(France) Antoine Brizard	May 22, 1994 (age 31)	setter
9	(Russia) Ivan Iakovlev (C)	April 17, 1995 (age 30)	middle blocker
10	(Russia) Kirill Ursov	February 13, 1995 (age 30)	outside hitter
11	(Russia) Igor Filippov	March 13, 1991 (age 34)	middle blocker
13	(Russia) Maxim Kosmin	April 9, 1998 (age 27)	middle blocker
14	(Russia) Ivan Podrebinkin	July 3, 1993 (age 32)	opposite
15	(Russia) Oreol Camejo	July 22, 1986 (age 39)	outside hitter
16	(Russia) Evgeny Andreev	January 6, 1995 (age 30)	libero
17	(Russia) Viktor Poletaev	July 27, 1995 (age 30)	opposite
18	(Russia) Egor Kliuka	June 15, 1995 (age 30)	outside hitter
19	(Ukraine) Dmytro Pashytskyy	November 29, 1987 (age 37)	middle blocker
Head coach: Tuomas Sammelvuo
