= Ivan Iakovlev =

Russian volleyball player (born 1995)

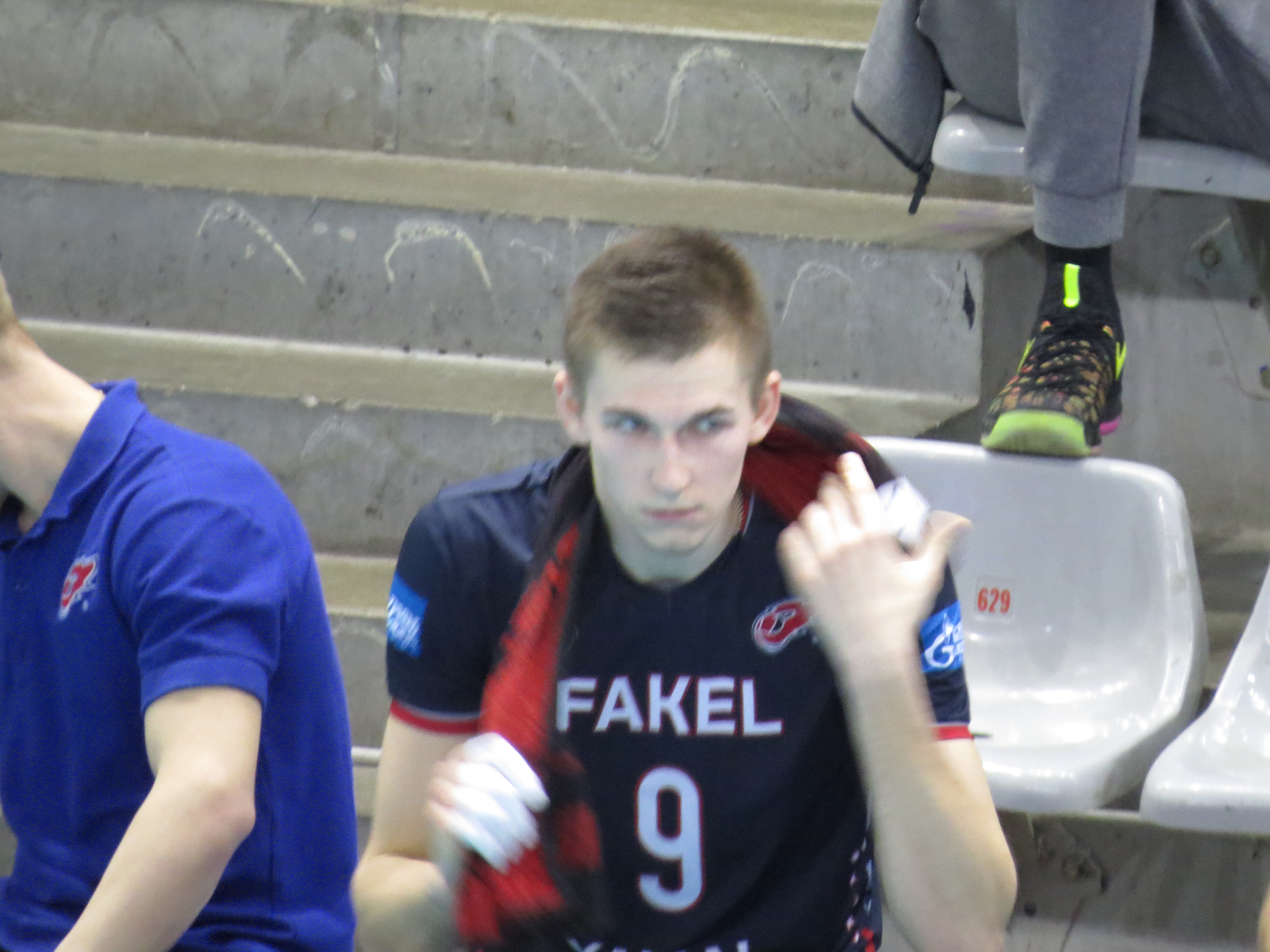
- Iakovlev in 2017

Personal information
- Full name: Ivan Gennadievich Iakovlev
- Nationality: (Russia) Russian
- Born: 17 April 1995 (age 31); Saint Petersburg, Russia
- Height: 2.07 m (6 ft 9 in)
- Weight: 86 kg (190 lb)
- Spike: 357 cm (141 in)
- Block: 336 cm (132 in)

Volleyball information
- Position: Middle blocker
- Current club: (Russia) Zenit Saint Petersburg
- Number: 9

Career
Years	Teams
2015–2019; 2019–	(Russia) Fakel Novy Urengoy (Russia) Zenit Saint Petersburg

National team
2019–	Russia
Honours
Volleyball
Representing ROC
Olympic Games
Silver medal – second place	2020 Tokyo	Team
Representing Russia
FIVB Nations League
Gold medal – first place	2019 Chicago	Team
World U23 Championship
Silver medal – second place	2017 Egypt	Under-23

Ivan Gennadievich Iakovlev (Russian: Иван Геннадьевич Яковлев, IPA: [ɪˈvan ˈjakəvlʲɪf]) (born 17 April 1995) is a Russian volleyball player. He is part of the Russia men's national volleyball team. On the club level, he plays for the Russian club Zenit Saint Petersburg.

== Sporting achievements ==
=== Clubs ===
- CEV Cup
  - 2020/2021 – with Zenit Saint Petersburg
- CEV Challenge Cup
  - 2015/2016 – with Fakel Novy Urengoy
  - 2016/2017 – with Fakel Novy Urengoy

=== Youth national team ===
- 2017 FIVB U23 World Championship

=== National team ===
- 2019 FIVB Nations League
- 2021 Olympic Games

=== Individual awards ===
- 2017: FIVB U23 World Championship – Best Middle Blocker
- 2019: FIVB Nations League – Best Middle Blocker
- 2021: Olympic Games Tokyo – Best Middle Blocker

Awards
Preceded by (Russia) Artem Volvich (Italy) Emanuele Birarelli	Best Middle Blocker of Olympic Games; 2020 ex aequo (France) Barthélémy Chinenyeze	Succeeded by TBD
Preceded by (France) Kévin Le Roux (Russia) Dmitry Muserskiy	Best Middle Blocker of FIVB Nations League; 2019 ex aequo (United States) Maxwell Holt	Succeeded by (Brazil) Maurício Souza (Poland) Mateusz Bieniek
