= 2007–08 Russian Volleyball Super League =

The Russian Volleyball Super League 2007/2008 was the 17th official season of Russian Volleyball Super League. In all there are 12 teams. Dynamo won second title

== Teams ==
Previous season	Team	Town	Arena (capacity)	Website	Head Coach	Foreign Players (max. 2)
1	Dynamo-Tattransgaz Kazan	Kazan	Basket-Hall Arena (7 000)	www.dinamottg.ru	(Russia) Viktor Sidelnikov	(United States) Lloy Ball (United States) Clayton Stanley
2	Dynamo Moscow	Moscow	Dynamo Sports Palace (5 000)	www.vcdynamo.ru	(Italy) Daniele Bagnoli	(Italy) Matej Černič (Brazil) Alan Barbosa Domingos
3	Iskra	Odintsovo	Volleyball Sportiv Complex (3 500)	www.vc-iskra.ru	(Serbia) Zoran Gajić	(Brazil) Giba (Germany) Jochen Schöps
4	Fakel	Novy Urengoy	CSC Gazodobytchik (800)	www.fakelvolley.ru	(Russia) Boris Kolchin	(Hungary) Dömötör Mészáros (United States) Thomas Hoff
5	Lokomotiv-Izumrud	Ekaterinburg	DIVS Uralochka (5 000)	loko-izumrud.ur.ru	(Russia) Valeriy Alferov	(United Kingdom) Terence Martin (United Kingdom) Jason Haldane
6	Dynamo-Yantar	Kaliningrad	SC Yunost	www.dinamoyantar.ru	(Russia) Yuriy Panchenko	(United States) Sean Rooney (Finland) Tuomas Sammelvuo
7	Gazprom-Yugra	Surgutsky district	SC Tennis Center	www.zsk-gazprom.ru	(Russia) Rafael Habibullin	(Slovenia) Sasa Gadnik (Algeria) Mahdi Hachemi
8	Lokomotiv Belogorie	Belgorod	Sports Palace Cosmos (5 000)	www.belogorievolley.ru	(Russia) Genadiy Shipulin	(Belgium) Frank Depestel (Brazil) Samuel Fuchs
9	Ural	Ufa	FOC Neftyanik Bashkortostana	www.volleyufa.ru	(Russia) Yuriy Marichev	(France) Loïc Thiebaut de Kegret (France) Renaud Herpe
10	Lokomotiv	Novosibirsk	SKK Sever (2 500)	www.lokovolley.ru	(Russia) Pavel Borsch	(United States) William Priddy (Puerto Rico) Héctor Soto
Promoted	Yaroslavich	Yaroslavl	SK Atlant	www.yarvolley.ru/	(Russia) Vladimir Babakin	(Argentina) Lukas Chaves (Canada) Frederick Winters
Promoted	Yugra-Samotlor	Niznevartovsk	SC Neftaynik	www.ugra-samotlor.ru	(Russia) Yuriy Korotkevich	(Ukraine) Sergey Shulga (Ukraine) Denis Chaus

== Regular season ==
=== Standings ===
Pos	Team	Pts	GP	W	L	SW	SL	Ratio
1	Iskra	55	22	19(3)	3(1)	60	19	3.158
2	Dynamo Moscow	55	22	19(2)	3(0)	59	19	3.105
3	Lokomotiv Novosibirsk	44	22	15(4)	7(3)	53	31	1.710
4	Dynamo Tattransgaz	44	22	15(2)	7(1)	50	32	1.563
5	Ural	33	22	11(5)	11(5)	47	48	0.979
6	Lokomotiv Belogorie	29	22	11(5)	11(1)	39	47	0.830
7	Fakel	27	22	9(2)	13(2)	36	46	0.783
8	Gazprom-Yugra	27	23	8(1)	14(4)	36	47	0.766
9	Yaroslavich	25	22	7(2)	15(6)	36	52	0.692
10	Yugra-Samotlor	25	22	9(4)	13(2)	33	51	0.647
11	Dynamo-Yantar	21	22	6(0)	16(3)	32	50	0.640
12	Lokomotiv-Izumrud	11	22	3(2)	19(4)	22	61	0.361

=== Results ===
	Dynamo- TTG	Dynamo	Iskra	Fakel	Lokomotiv- Izumrud	Dynamo- Yantar	Gazprom- Yugra	Lokomotiv Belogorie	Ural	Lokomotiv	Yaroslavich	Yugra- Samotlor
Dynamo-Tattransgaz		1-3	0-3	3-1	3-1	3-1	3-1	1-3	3-2	2-3	3-0	3-0
Dynamo	3-1		3-1	3-0	3-0	3-0	3-0	3-0	3-1	3-2	3-1	3-0
Iskra	3-0	0-3		3-0	3-0	3-1	3-0	3-0	3-1	3-2	3-0	3-0
Fakel	0-3	1-3	1-3		3-0	0-3	3-0	3-0	3-2	3-0	3-2	3-1
Lokomotiv-Izumrud	2-3	0-3	0-3	1-3		3-0	1-3	1-3	3-2	0-3	2-3	3-2
Dynamo-Yantar	1-3	2-3	0-3	1-3	3-0		0-3	3-1	3-1	1-3	3-0	3-0
Gazprom-Yugra	0-3	0-3	1-3	3-1	3-0	3-2		2-3	2-3	3-1	1-3	3-0
Lokomotiv Belogorie	1-3	3-0	0-3	3-2	3-2	3-1	3-1		3-0	0-3	3-2	3-2
Ural	1-3	3-1	2-3	3-1	3-2	3-2	3-2	3-2		3-1	3-1	3-1
Lokomotiv	3-0	0-3	3-2	3-0	3-0	3-0	3-1	3-1	3-0		3-2	2-3
Yaroslavich	0-3	3-1	2-3	3-2	3-0	3-1	0-3	3-0	0-3	2-3		1-3
Yugra-Samotlor	0-3	0-3	0-3	3-0	3-1	3-1	3-2	3-1	3-2	0-3	3-2	

== Playoffs ==
23, 24, 28, 29 April and 3 May

=== Places 1/2 ===
Dynamo Moscow 3 : 1 Iskra

April 23, 2008			Odintsovo
Iskra	1 - 3	Dynamo Moscow	(22-25, 25-22, 23-25, 22-25)
April 24, 2008			Odintsovo
Iskra	3 - 1	Dynamo Moscow	(25-19, 20-25, 25-17, 28-26)
April 28, 2008			Moscow
Dynamo Moscow	3 - 1	Iskra	(25-12, 25-21, 20-25, 25-17)
April 29, 2008			Moscow
Dynamo Moscow	3 - 1	Iskra	(25-27, 25-21, 25-15, 25-21)

=== Places 3/4 ===
Dynamo Tattransgaz 3 : 1 Lokomotiv Novosibirsk

April 23, 2008			Novosibirsk
Lokomotiv Novosibirsk	1 - 3	Dynamo Tattransgaz	(18-25, 25-20, 18-25, 22-25)
April 24, 2008			Novosibirsk
Lokomotiv Novosibirsk	3 - 2	Dynamo Tattransgaz	(25-19, 20-25, 28-26, 17-25, 17-15)
April 28, 2008			Kazan
Dynamo Tattransgaz	3 - 2	Lokomotiv Novosibirsk	(21-25, 26-24, 26-28, 25-20, 15-10)
April 29, 2008			Kazan
Dynamo Tattransgaz	3 - 0	Lokomotiv Novosibirsk	(25-21, 25-19, 26-24)

=== Places 5/6 ===
Lokomotiv Belogorie 3 : 1 Ural

April 23, 2008			Ufa
Ural	2 - 3	Lokomotiv Belogorie	(22-25, 25-21, 25-23, 21-25, 10-15)
April 24, 2008			Ufa
Ural	3 - 1	Lokomotiv Belogorie	(25-27, 25-20, 25-13, 25-16)
April 28, 2008			Belgorod
Lokomotiv Belogorie	3 - 1	Ural	(25-19, 25-20, 19-25, 25-15)
April 29, 2008			Belgorod
Lokomotiv Belogorie	3 - 2	Ural	(20-25, 28-26, 22-25, 25-20, 15-12)
