= Fakel Novy Urengoy =

Russian volleyball club

- Full name: Volleyball Club "Fakel" Novy Urengoy
- Founded: 1996
- Ground: Cultural and Sports Center Gazodobytchik; Novy Urengoy (Capacity: 1,000)
- Chairman: Nikolai Kapranov
- Manager: Igor Chutchev
- Captain: Igor Kolodinsky
- League: Super League
- 2020/21: 6th
- Website: Club home page

Uniforms
Home	Away

Fakel Novy Urengoy (Russian: Факел Новый Уренгой) is a Russian professional men's volleyball team, based in Novy Urengoy, playing in Super League since 2004.

== International competitions ==
- Club World Championship
  Third place (×1) 2018
- CEV Cup
  Winners (×1) 2007
- CEV Challenge Cup
  Winners (×1) 2017
  Runners-up (×1) 2016

Domestic competitions

- Russian Super League
  Third place (×2) 2009, 2019
- Russian Cup

Runners-up (×1): 2006

== Team roster ==
=== 2015/2016 ===
Head coach: (Russia) Igor Chutchev

No.	Name	Date of birth	Position
2	(Russia) Ilia Vlasov	August 3, 1995 (age 30)	middle blocker
3	(Russia) Sergei Pirainen	February 27, 1996 (age 29)	opposite
4	(Russia) Vadim Likhosherstov	January 23, 1989 (age 36)	middle blocker
5	(Russia) Andrey Alekseev	January 29, 1997 (age 28)	libero
7	(Russia) Igor Kolodinsky	July 7, 1983 (age 42)	setter
8	(Russia) Denis Shipotko	February 28, 1985 (age 40)	outside hitter
9	(Russia) Ivan Iakovlev	April 17, 1995 (age 30)	middle blocker
10	(Russia) Denis Bogdan	October 13, 1996 (age 29)	outside hitter
11	(Russia) Igor Tyurin	June 13, 1987 (age 38)	opposite
13	(Russia) Vladimir Shishkin	February 2, 1990 (age 35)	libero
15	(Russia) Dmitry Volkov	May 25, 1995 (age 30)	outside hitter
16	(Russia) Valentin Bezrukov	January 26, 1990 (age 35)	setter
17	(Russia) Artem Tohtash	April 17, 1986 (age 39)	middle blocker
18	(Russia) Egor Kliuka	June 15, 1995 (age 30)	outside hitter

== Notable players ==
Notable, former or current players of club, who are medalist of intercontinental tournaments in national teams or clubs.

- (Poland) Łukasz Żygadło
- (Poland) Michał Winiarski
