= VC CSKA Moscow =

Russian volleyball club

- Full name: Volleyball Club "CSKA" Moscow
- Founded: 1946; 79 years ago 2021; 4 years ago
- Dissolved: 2009; 16 years ago
- Ground: MVK CSKA (Capacity: 5,500)
- League: Russian Volleyball Super League

Uniforms
Home	Away

VC CSKA Moscow (Russian: ВК ЦСКА Москва) was a Russian volleyball club. They played in the Russian Super League, winning the competition three times. The club is the most titled volleyball team in the Soviet Union / Russia and in Europe with 13 CEV Champions Leagues. In 2009, VC CSKA Moscow was disbanded due to financial problems.

== Team honours ==
=== Domestic competitions ===
- Soviet Championship:
  - Winners (33) (record): 1949, 1950, 1952, 1953, 1954, 1955, 1958, 1960, 1961, 1962, 1965, 1966, 1970–1983, 1985–1991
- Soviet Cup
  - Winners (5) (record): 1953, 1980, 1982, 1984, 1985
- Russian Super League
  - Winners (3): 1994, 1995, 1996
  - Runners-up (1): 1993
  - Third place (2): 1997, 1998
- Russian Cup
  - Winners (1): 1994
  - Third place (1): 1997

=== European competitions ===
- CEV Champions League
  - Winners (13) (record): 1960, 1962, 1973, 1974, 1975, 1977, 1982, 1983, 1986, 1987, 1988, 1989, 1991
  - Runners-up (3): 1961, 1963, 1981
  - Third place (2): 1992
- CEV European Super Cup
  - Winners (3): 1987, 1988, 1991
  - Runners-up (1): 1989

=== Worldwide competitions ===
- FIVB Club World Championship
  - Runners-up (1): 1989

== Notable players ==
- Konstantin Reva (1921–1997), World and Europe champion
- Yuri Chesnokov (1933–2010), Volleyball Hall of Fame Member
- Georgi Mondzolevski (born 1934), Olympic and World champion, Volleyball Hall of Fame Member
- Aleksandr Savin (born 1957), Olympic champion, Volleyball Hall of Fame member
