= Russian Men's Volleyball Super Cup =

Russian Volleyball Super Cup
- Sport: Volleyball
- Founded: 2008
- No. of teams: 2
- Country: Russia
- Most recent champion: Zenit-Kazan (9th title)
- Website: https://volley.ru/pages/80/

The Russian Men's Volleyball Supercup is a volleyball competition between the champion of Russia and the winner of the Cup of Russia . The first edition of the Russian Volleyball Supercup was held in the 2008/09 season.

== List of champions ==
Years	Winners	Score	Runners-up
2008	Dynamo Moscow	3 - 0 (25–18, 25–20, 25–23)	Zenit Kazan
2009	Dynamo Moscow	3 - 1 (25–22, 25–22, 25–27, 25–22)	Zenit Kazan
2010	Zenit Kazan	3 - 0 (25–23, 25–18, 25–16)	Lokomotiv Belgorod
2011	Zenit Kazan	3 - 0 (25–23, 29–27, 25–21)	Lokomotiv Novosibirsk
2012	Zenit Kazan	3 - 2 (22–25, 21–25, 25–18, 25–16, 15–10)	Lokomotiv Novosibirsk
2013	Lokomotiv Belgorod	3 - 2 (21–25, 21–25, 25–23, 25–23, 15–13)	Zenit Kazan
2014	Belogorie Belgorod	3 - 1 (25–21, 25–20, 21–25, 25–18)	Zenit Kazan
2015	Zenit Kazan	3 - 0 (25–21, 29–27, 25–15)	Belogorie Belgorod
2016	Zenit Kazan	3 - 0 (25–14, 25–18, 25–15)	Dynamo Moscow
2017	Zenit Kazan	3 - 0 (25–19, 25–21, 25–14)	Dynamo Moscow
2018	Zenit Kazan	3 - 1 (25–16, 21–25, 25–15, 25–20)	Zenit Saint Petersburg
2019	Kuzbass Kemerovo	3 - 1 (21–25, 25–21, 25–19, 25–23)	Zenit Kazan
2020	Zenit Kazan	3 - 2 (25–18, 22–25, 25–23, 23–25, 15–9)	Lokomotiv Novosibirsk
2021	Dynamo Moscow	3 - 1	Zenit Saint Petersburg
2022	Dynamo Moscow	3 - 2 (33–35, 25–23, 25–23, 20–25, 15–8)	Zenit Kazan
2023	Zenit Kazan	3 - 0 (25–23, 25–22, 25–17)	VC Dynamo Moscow

== Winners by club ==
Rk.	Club	Titles #	City	Years Won
1	Zenit Kazan	9	Kazan	2010, 2011, 2012, 2015, 2016, 2017, 2018, 2020, 2023
2	Dynamo Moscow	4	Moscow	2008, 2009, 2021, 2022
3	Lokomotiv Belgorod	2	Belgorod	2013, 2014
4	Kuzbass Kemerovo	1	Kemerovo	2019
