= Novy Urengoy =

Novy Urengoy Новый Уренгой
- City
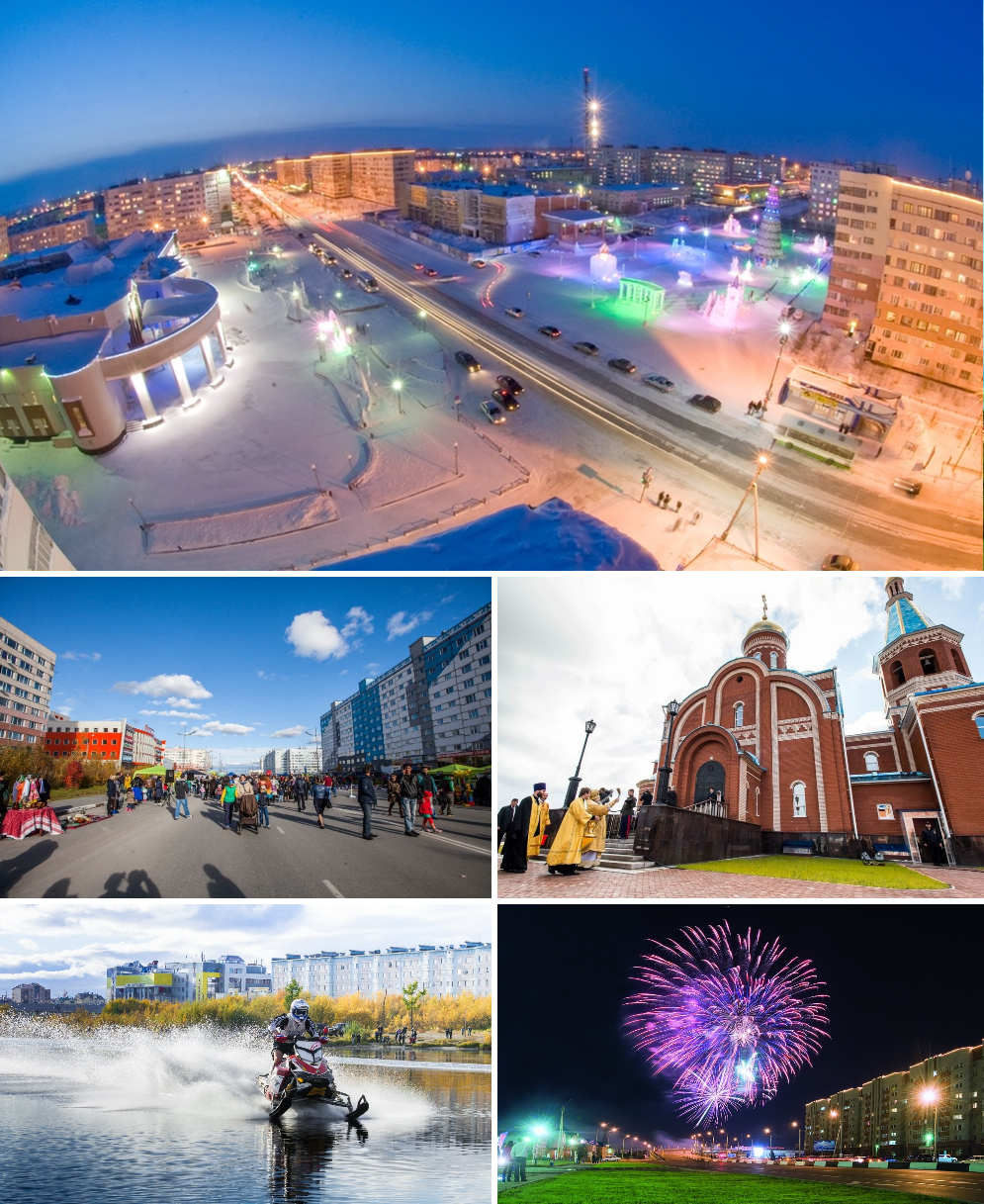
- Counter-clockwise: Central Square, Leningradsky Avenue, Lake Molodezhnoe, Gubkina Avenue, Epiphany Cathedral

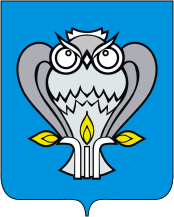
- Flag Coat of arms
- Interactive map of Novy Urengoy
- Location of Novy Urengoy Novy Urengoy (Yamalo-Nenets Autonomous Okrug)
- Coordinates: 66°05′N 76°41′E
- Country: Russia
- Federal subject: Yamalo-Nenets Autonomous Okrug
- Founded: 1975
- City status since: 1980

Government
  - Head: Andrey Voronov
- Elevation: 40 m (130 ft)

Population (2010 Census)
  - Total: 104,107
  - Estimate (1 January 2024): 106,890 (+2.7%)
  - Rank: 155th in 2010

Administrative status
  - Subordinated to: city of okrug significance of Novy Urengoy
  - Capital of: city of okrug significance of Novy Urengoy

Municipal status
  - Urban okrug: Novy Urengoy Urban Okrug
  - Capital of: Novy Urengoy Urban Okrug
- Time zone: UTC+5 (MSK+2)
- Postal code: 629300–629329
- Dialing code: +7 3494
- OKTMO ID: 71956000001
- Website: nur.yanao.ru

Novy Urengoy (Russian: Но́вый Уренго́й, lit: “New Urengoy”) is the most populous city in Yamalo-Nenets Autonomous Okrug, Russia. In 2021, it had a population of 107,251. Novy Urengoy is located around 450 kilometres or 280 miles from Salekhard, the capital of the autonomous okrug.

== Etymology ==
The name of the city means New Urengoy. The word Urengoy comes from a combination of Khanty word Ure meaning Old woman and Nenets word Ngo, meaning island.

== History ==
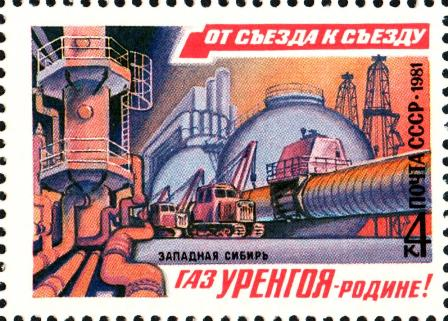
A USSR stamp, 1981

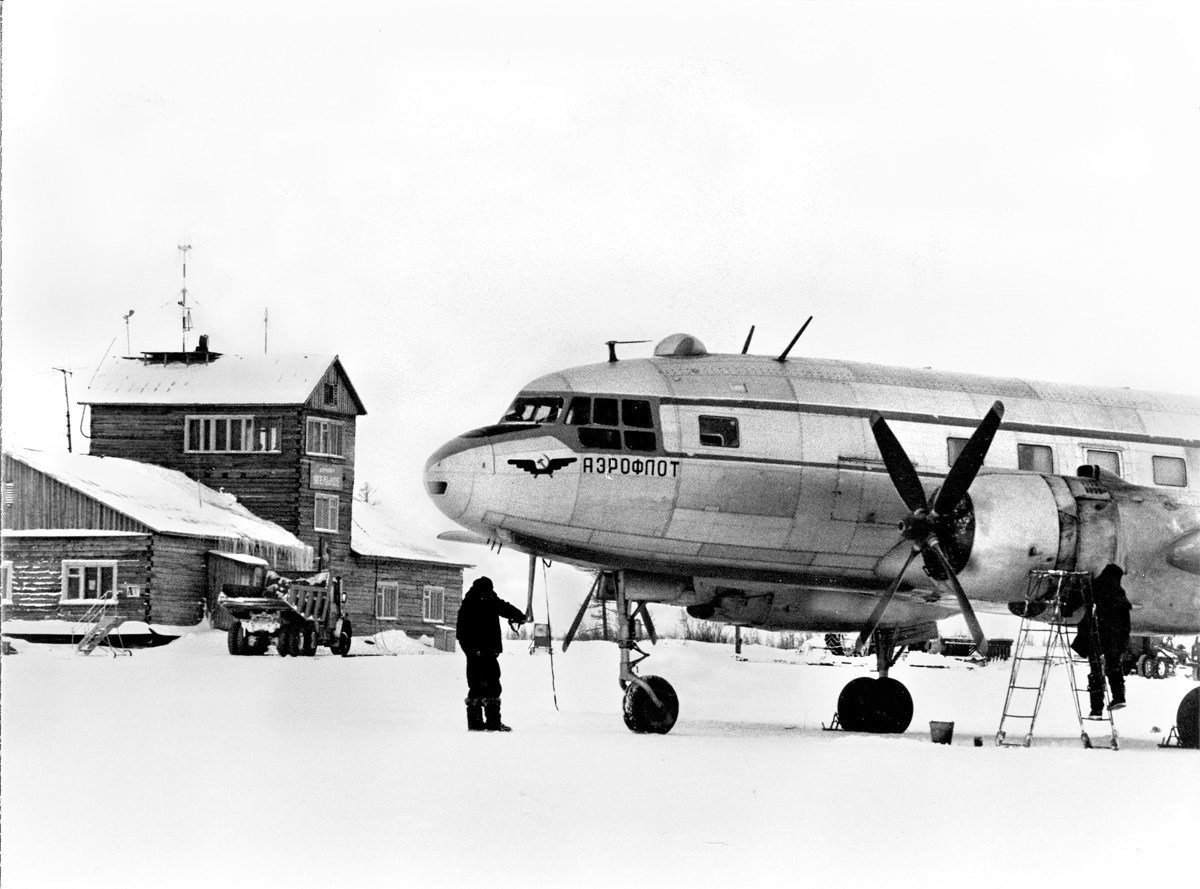
an Ilyushin Il-14 at Novy Urengoy Airport

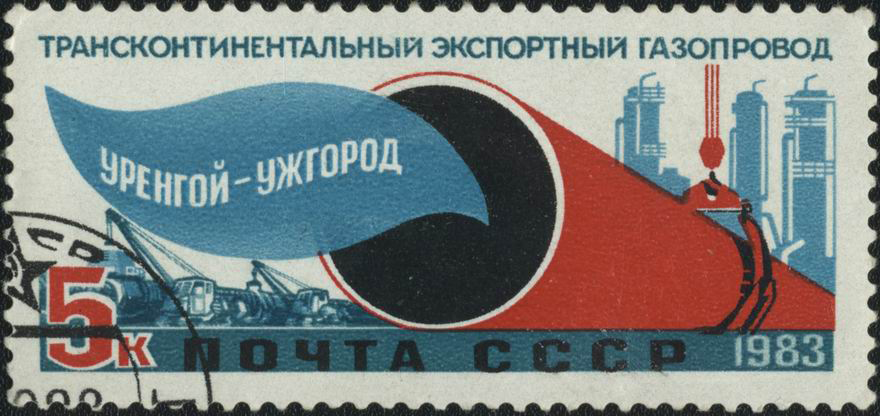
A USSR stamp, 1983

Novy Urengoy was founded in 1975 after the discovery of the Urengoy gas field, one of the largest in Russia. Town status was granted to it in 1980.

== Demographics ==
Population: 107,271 (2021 census); 101,107 (2010 census); 94,456 (2002 census); 93,235 (1989 Soviet census).

== Administrative and municipal status ==
Within the framework of administrative divisions, it is incorporated as the city of okrug significance of Novy Urengoy—an administrative unit with the status equal to that of the districts. As a municipal division, the city of okrug significance of Novy Urengoy is incorporated as Novy Urengoy Urban Okrug.

== Climate ==
=== Nature ===
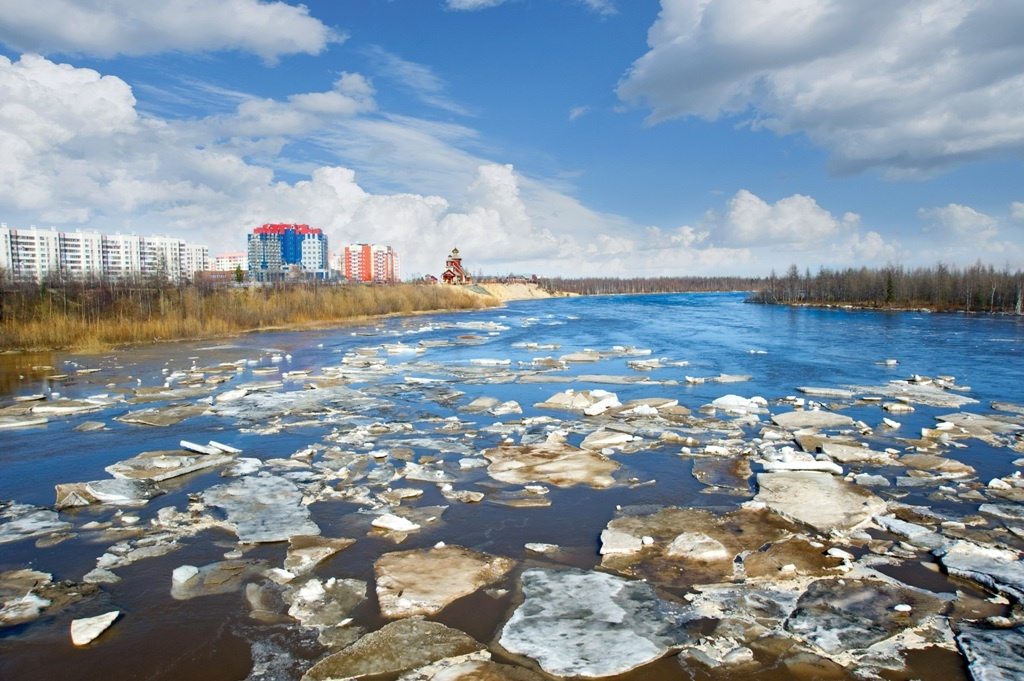
Sede-Yakha river

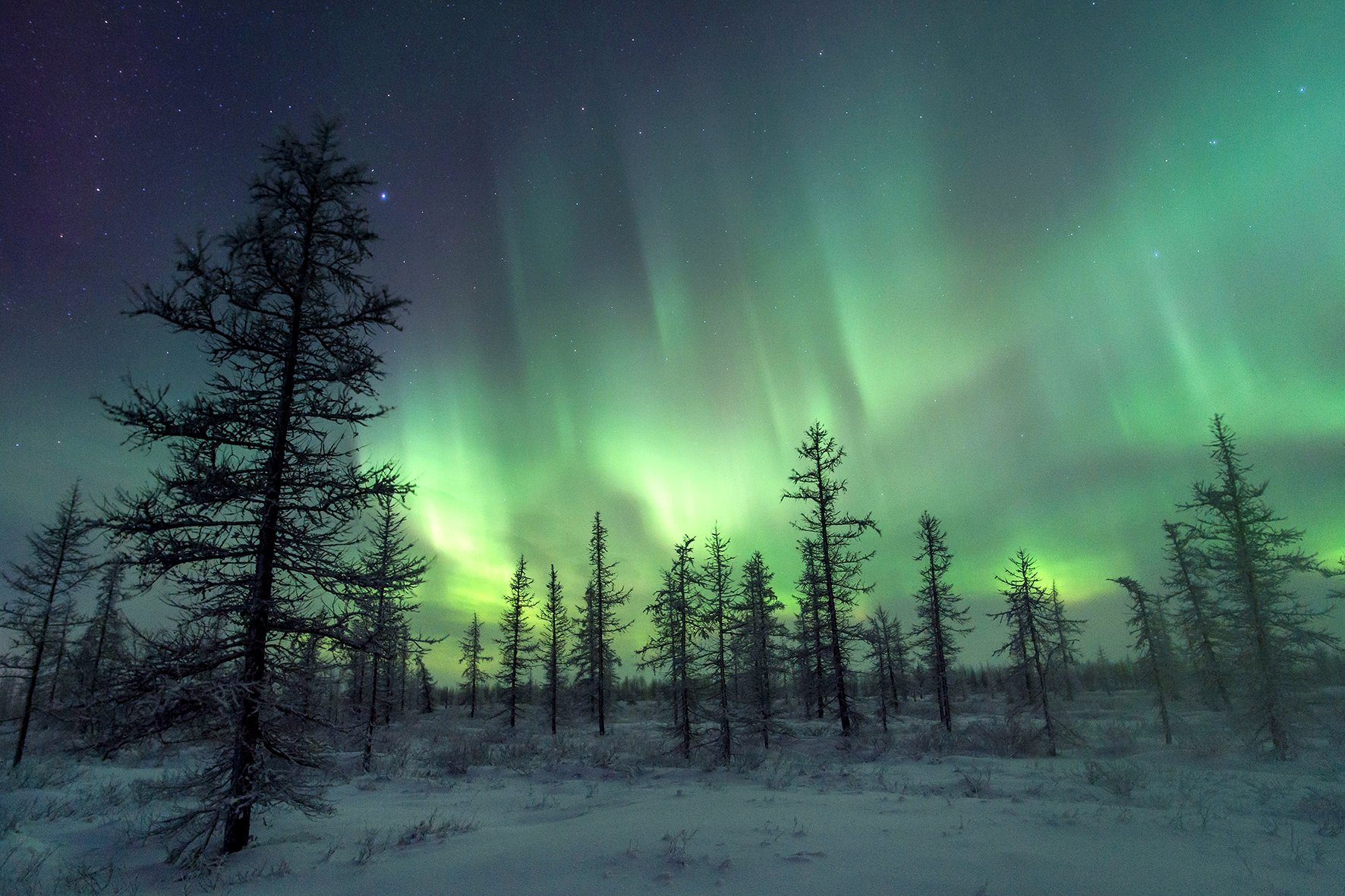
Aurora in Novy Urengoy

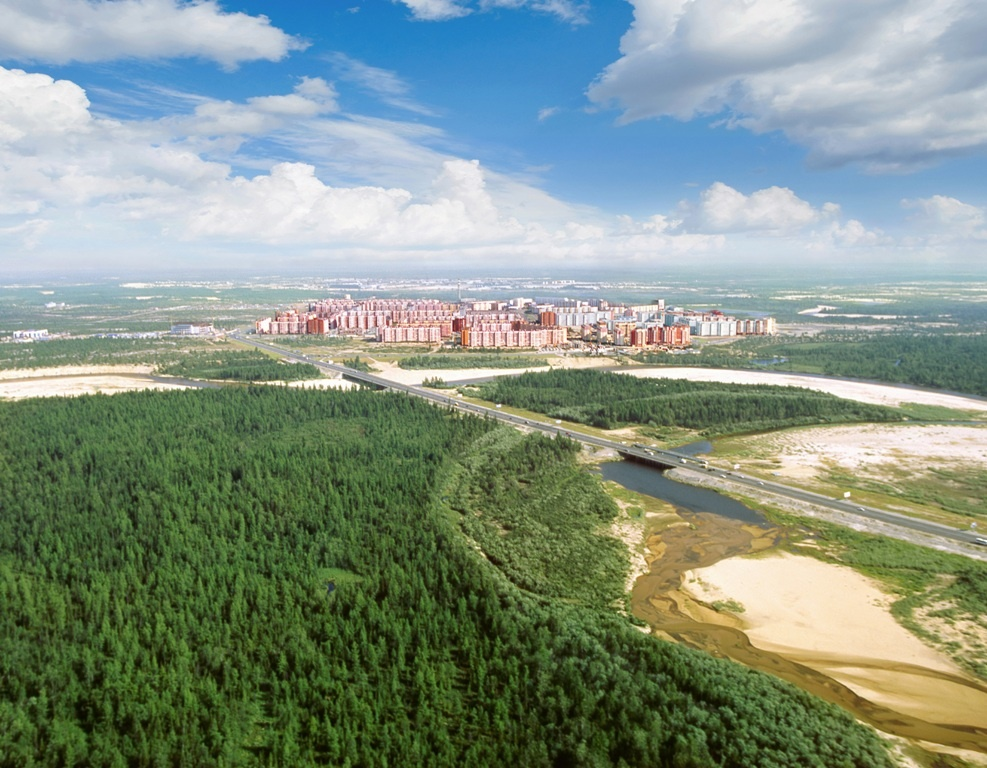
Forest in Novy Urengoy

Novy Urengoy has a subarctic climate (Köppen climate classification Dfc). Winters are severely cold and long with average temperatures from −30 °C (−22 °F) to −22 °C (−7.6 °F) in January, while summers are mild and brief with average temperatures from +10 °C (50 °F) to +18 °C (64.4 °F) in July. Precipitation is moderate, and is somewhat higher in summer than at other times of the year.

Climate data for Novy Urengoy
Month	Jan	Feb	Mar	Apr	May	Jun	Jul	Aug	Sep	Oct	Nov	Dec	Year
Mean daily maximum °C (°F)	−22 (−8)	−21 (−6)	−13 (9)	−6 (21)	1 (34)	11 (52)	18 (64)	15 (59)	8 (46)	−3 (27)	−13 (9)	−18 (0)	−4 (26)
Mean daily minimum °C (°F)	−30 (−22)	−30 (−22)	−23 (−9)	−17 (1)	−7 (19)	4 (39)	10 (50)	8 (46)	2 (36)	−9 (16)	−20 (−4)	−26 (−15)	−11 (11)
Average precipitation mm (inches)	27 (1.1)	20 (0.8)	24 (0.9)	25 (1.0)	34 (1.3)	48 (1.9)	57 (2.2)	64 (2.5)	61 (2.4)	45 (1.8)	36 (1.4)	30 (1.2)	471 (18.5)
Source: World Climate Guide

== Economy ==
A major industry of the city is oil and gas production, with one of the largest gas fields in the world in the area and substantial prospects for further exploration. The government-owned company Gazprom is the main local employer.

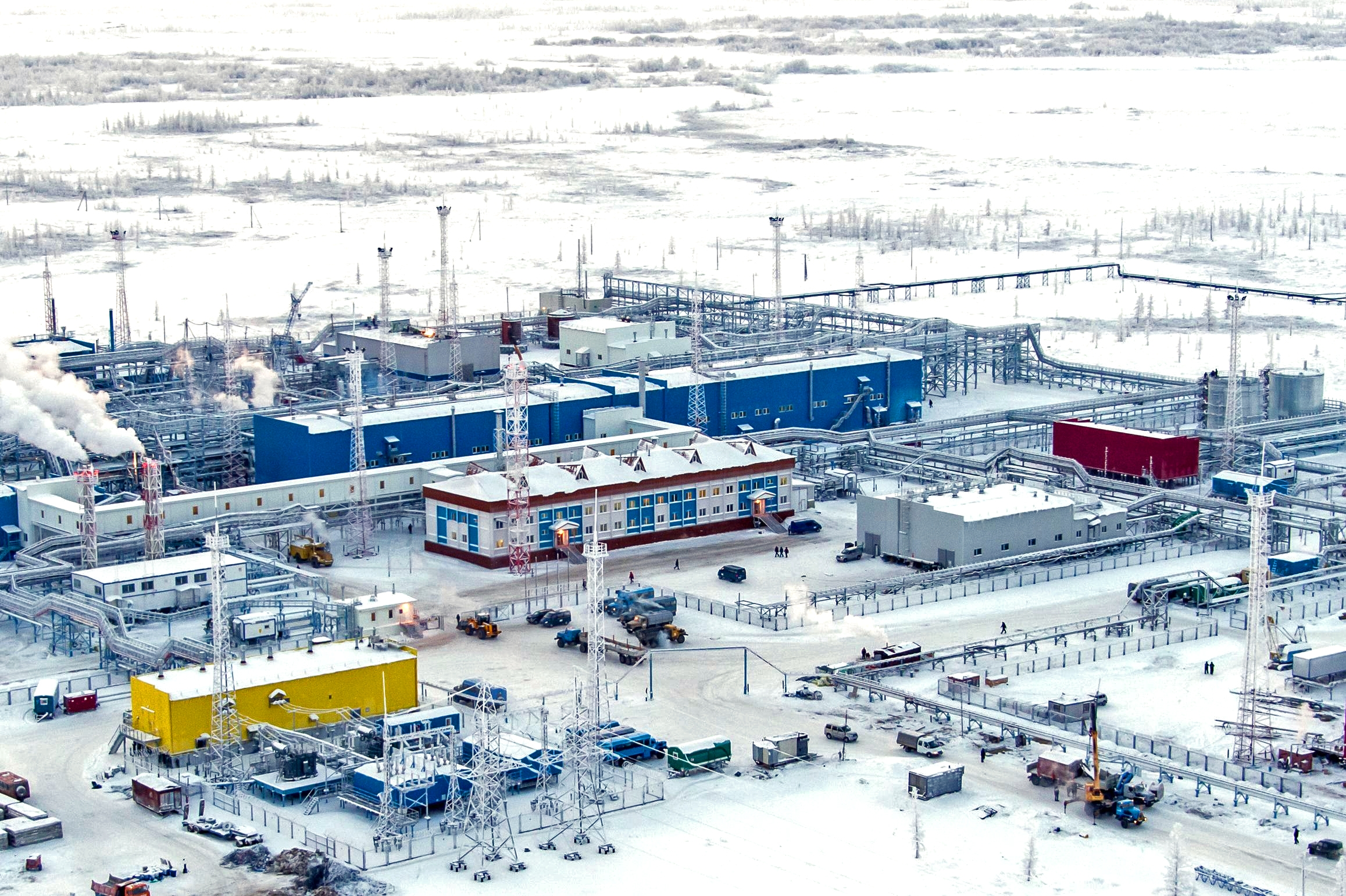
Zapolyarnoye gas field

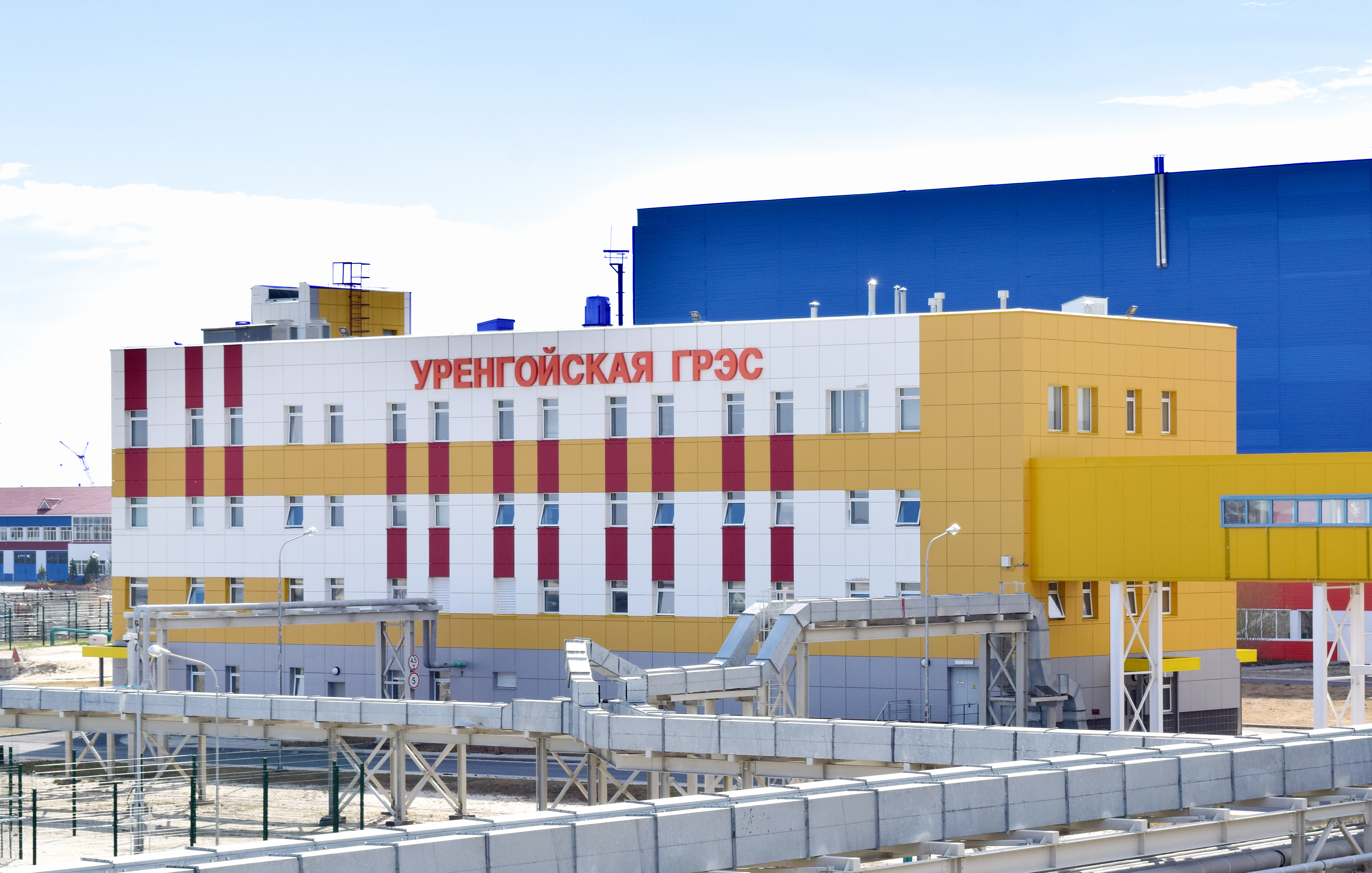
Urengoyskaya GRES a combined cycle power plant

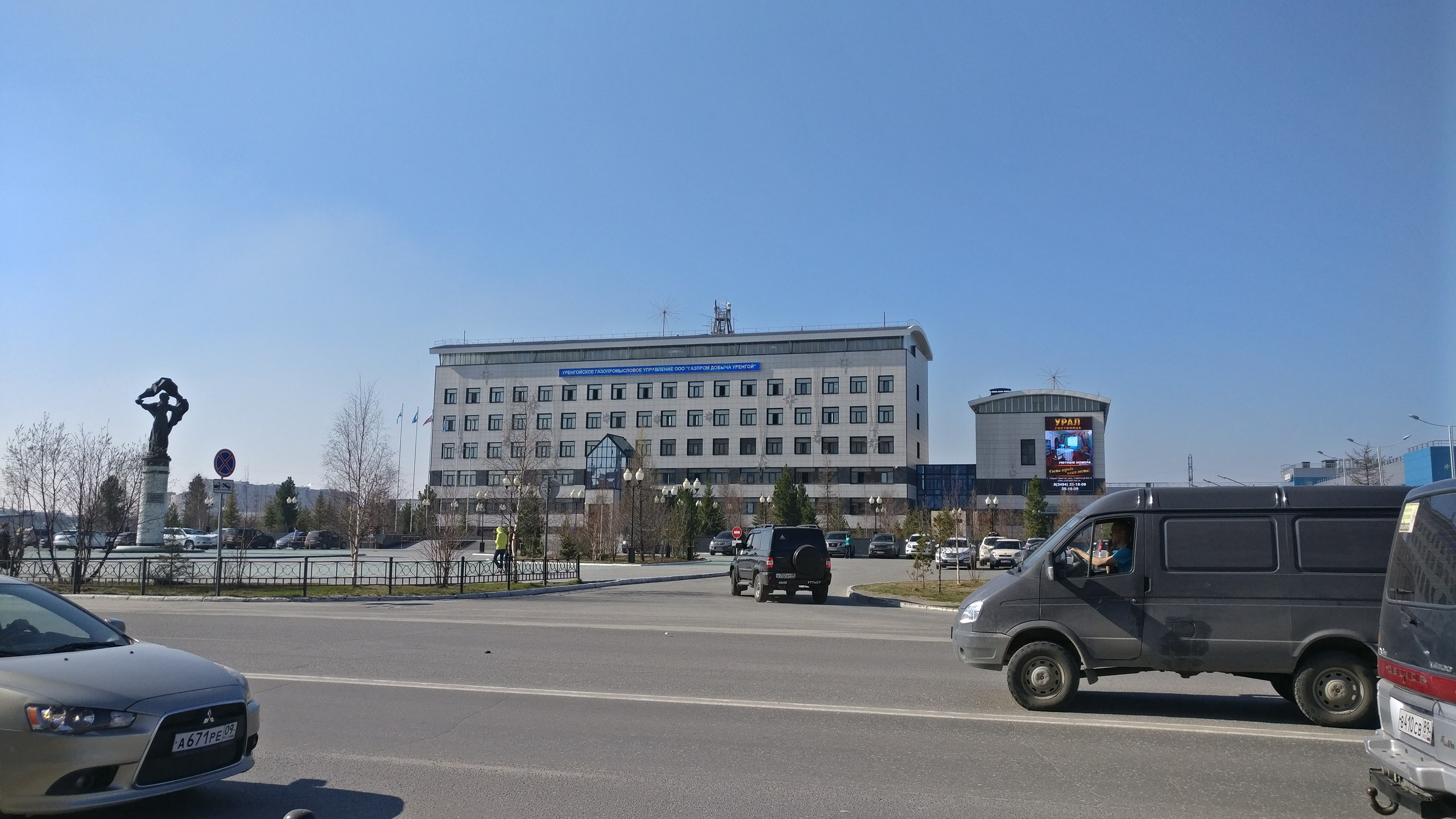
Urengoy gas production department

=== Transportation ===
The city is situated on the Tyumen–Novy Urengoy railway line. Traveling north from Tyumen, Novy Urengoy is the last station of significance. Noyabrsk is the previous station of significance.

Novy Urengoy is along the Salekhard–Igarka Railway, "Dead Road". Extending from Novy Urengoy to Stary Nadym is one section of the "Railway of Death" that serves as an important freight railway.

The city is served by the Novy Urengoy Airport.

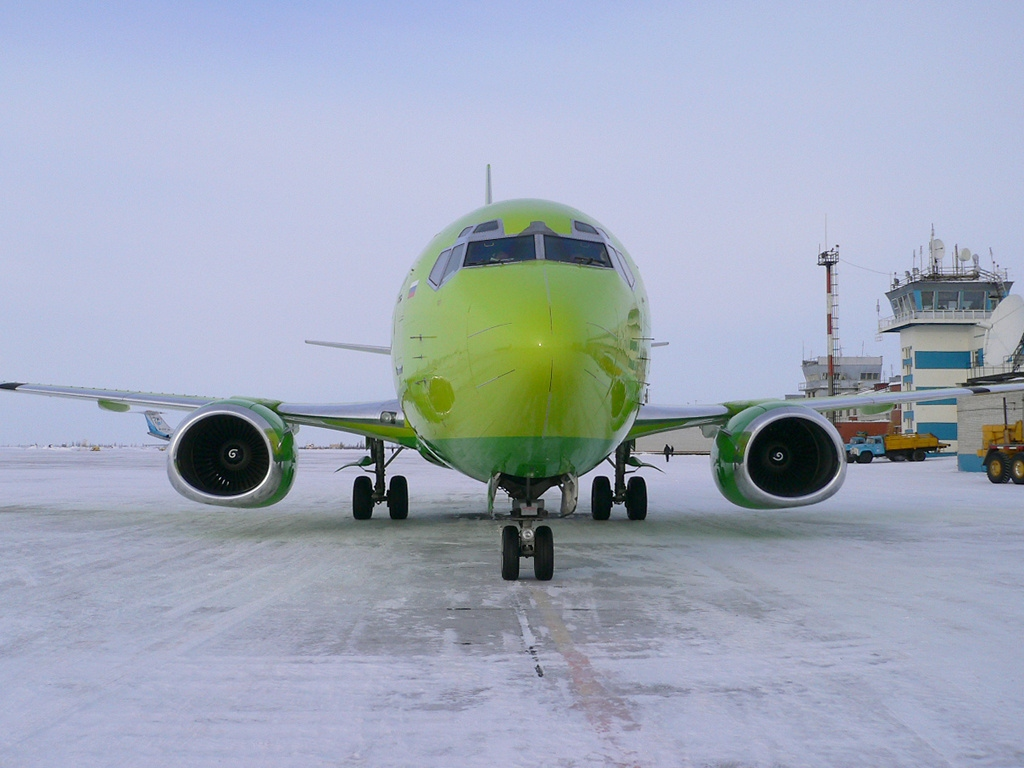
Boeing 737 at Novy Urengoy Airport

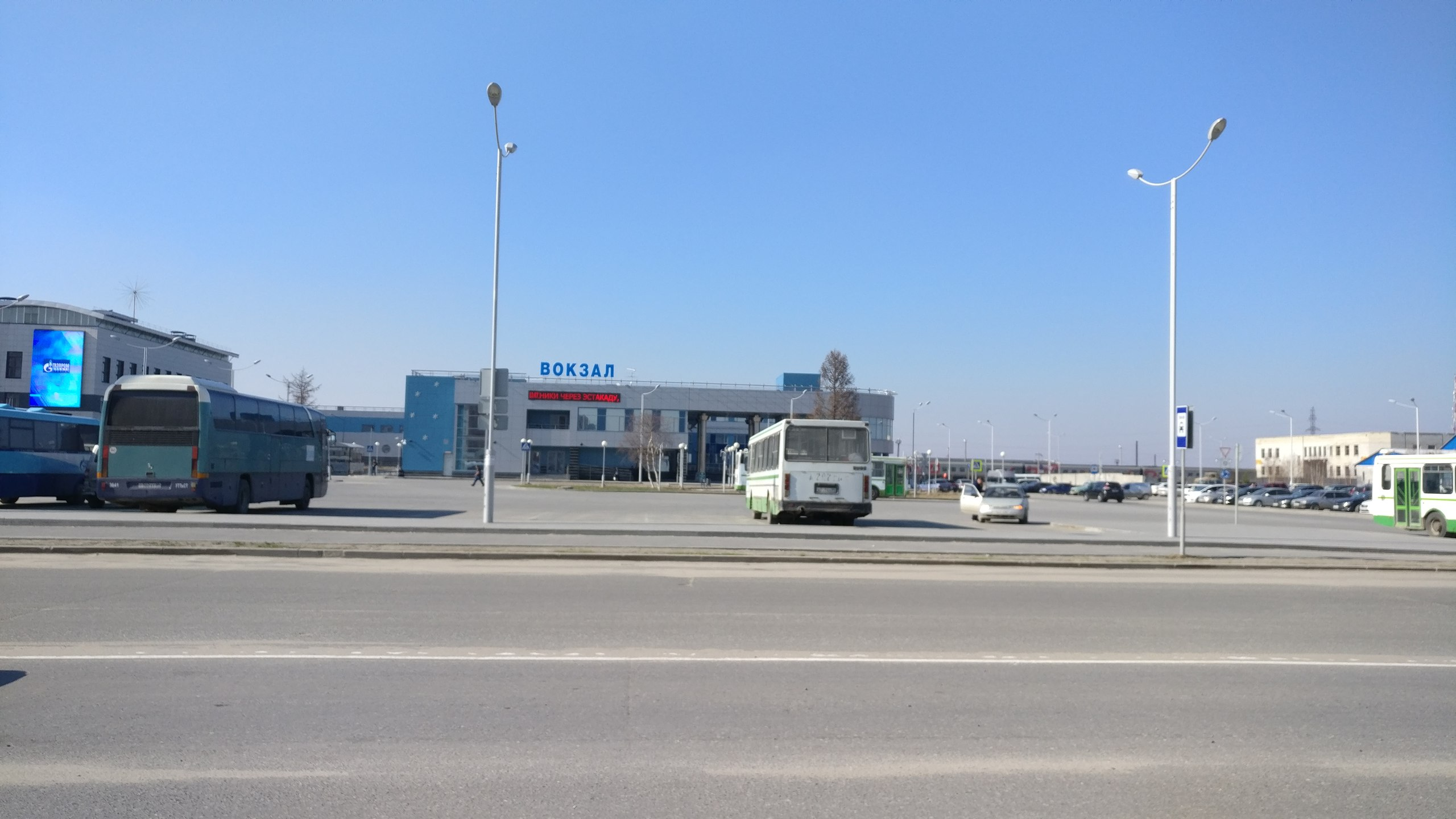
Novy Urengoy railway station

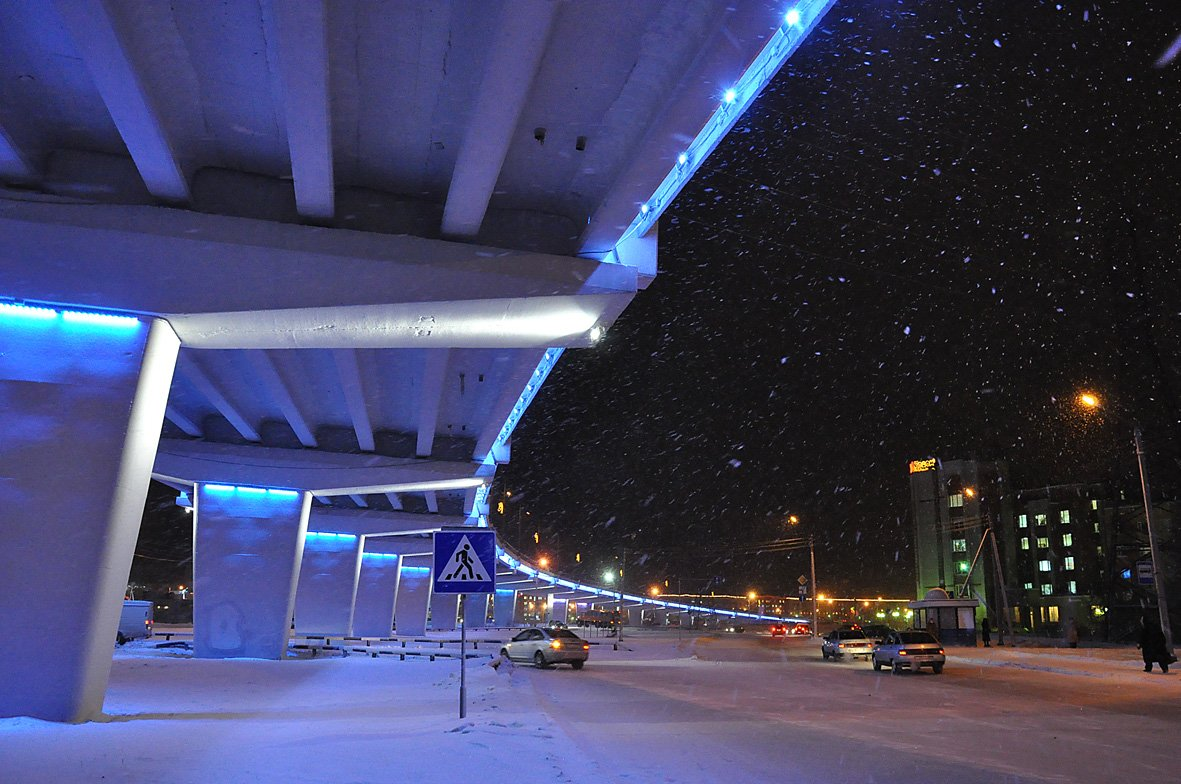
Overpass bridge in Novy Urengoy

== Sports ==
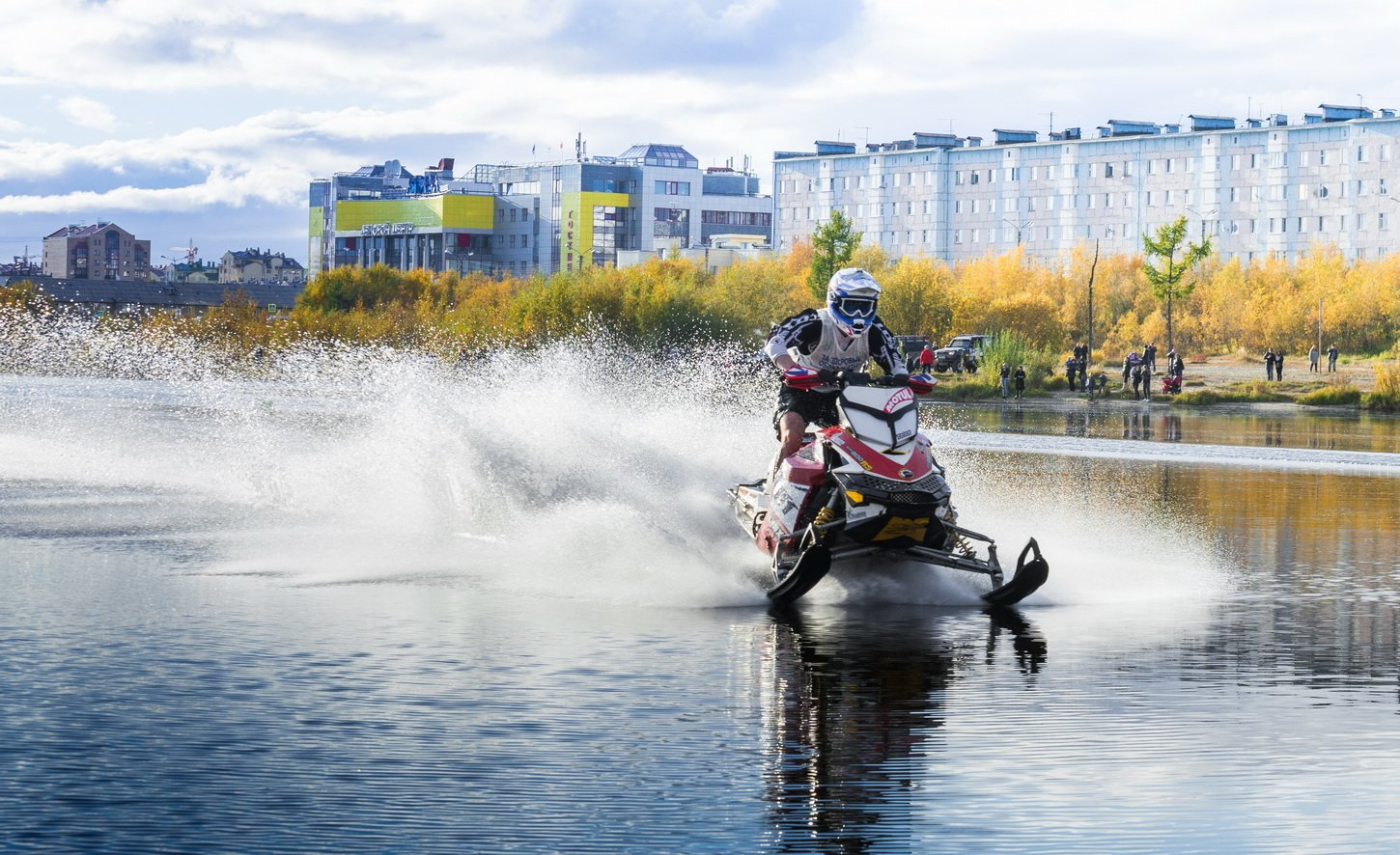
Snowmobile racing on water

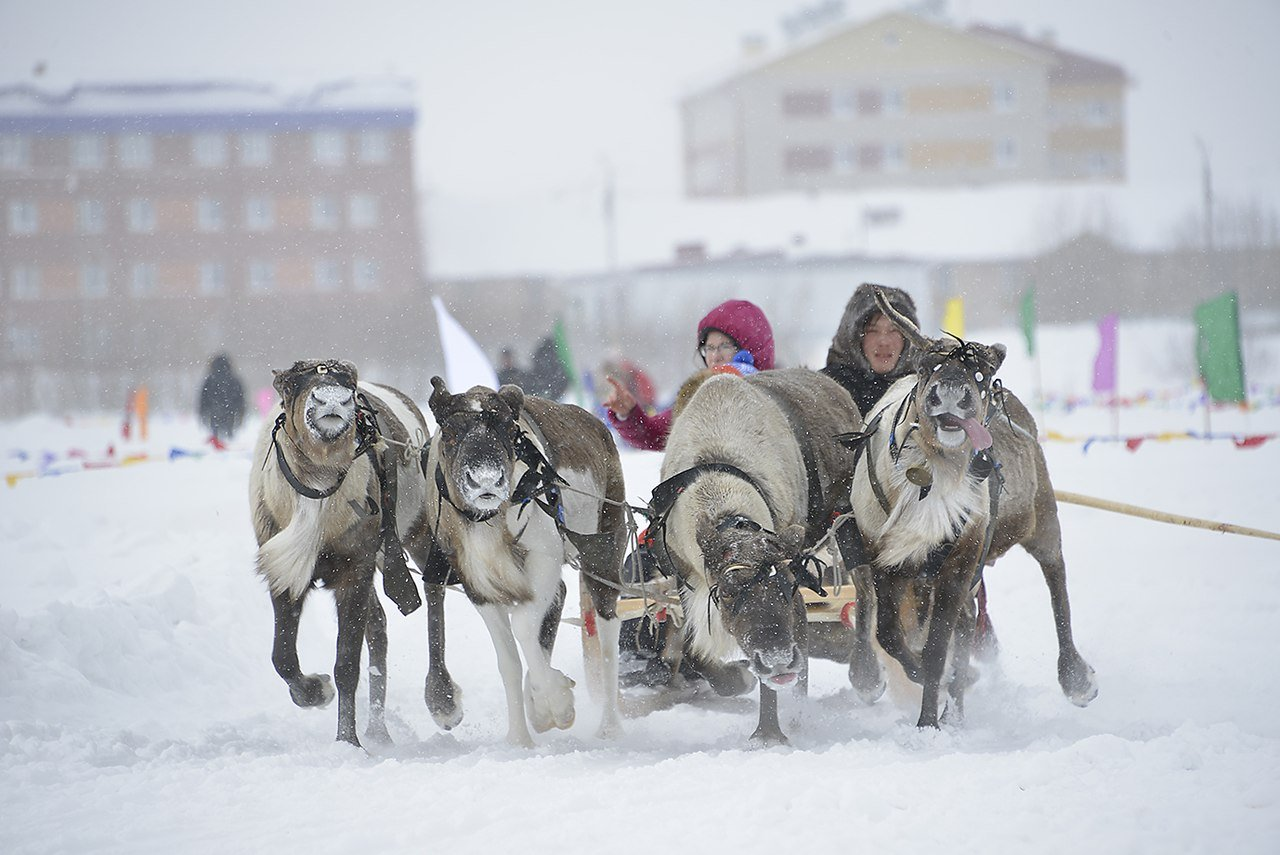
Reindeer team during the Festival of the Peoples of the North

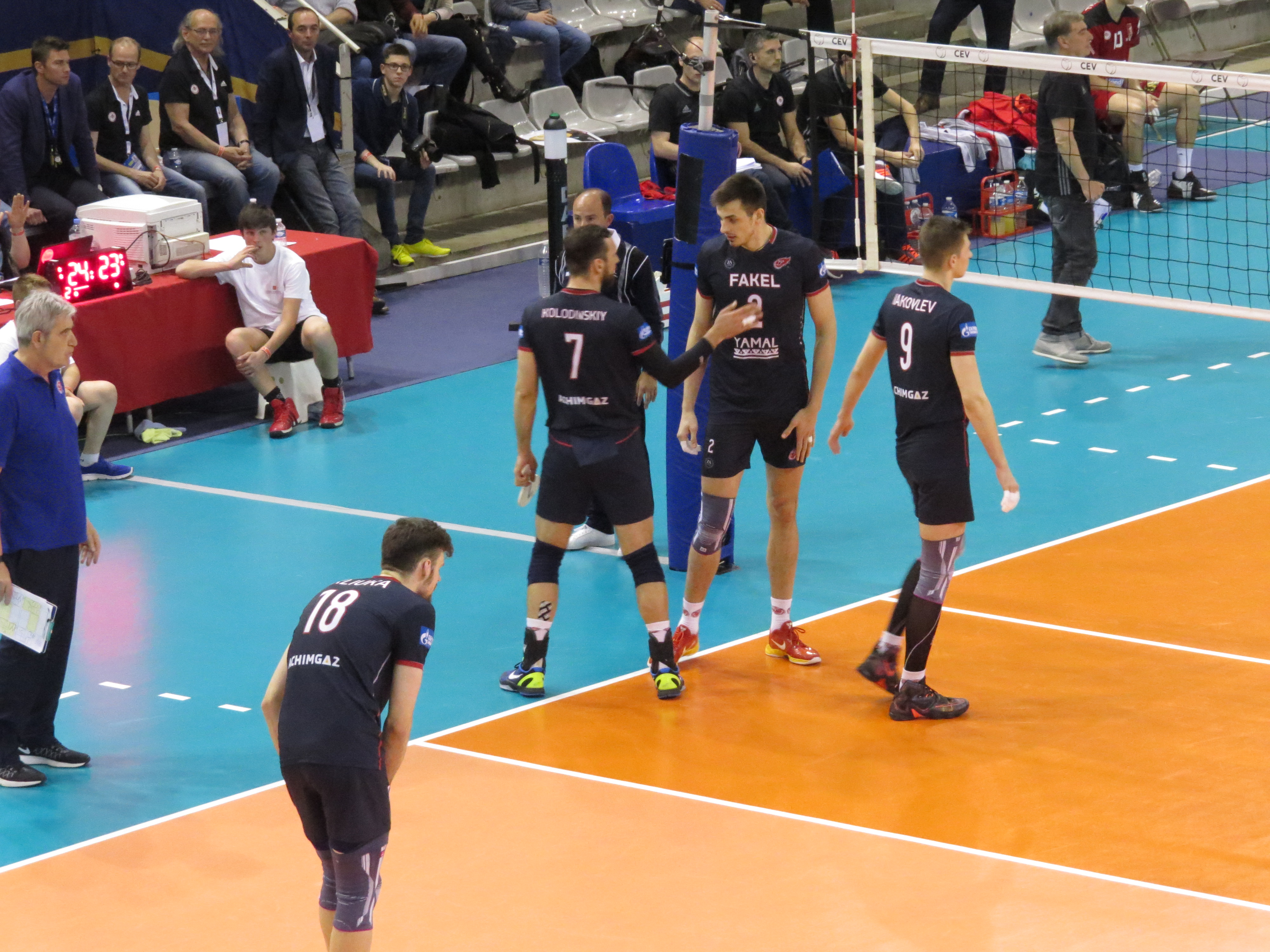
Fakel Novy Urengoy players at CEV Challenge Cup

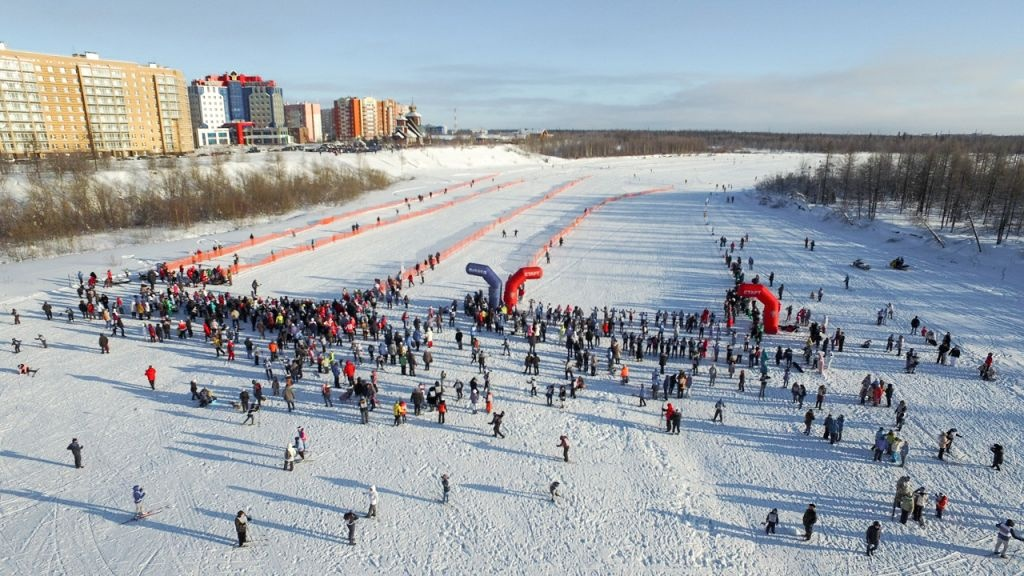
Skiing Novy Urengoy

Fakel is a men's volleyball team competing in the Russian Volleyball Super League and playing at the Gazodobytchik Sports Center. In the 2008–09 season they finished third in the competition, behind Zenit Kazan and Iskra Odintsovo.
