= Russian Volleyball Cup =

- Sport: Volleyball
- Founded: 1993
- Country: Russia
- Most recent champion: Zenit Kazan (2022)
- Website: https://volley.ru/pages/80/

The Russian Volleyball Cup in (Russian: Кубок России по волейболу среди мужчин) is the second most important tournament after the national championship in a series of competitions for volleyball clubs in Russia . It has been held since 1993, and then since 2009 it has been named after Konstantin Reva .

== Winners list ==
Years	Champions	Runners-up	Final score
1993	Samotlor Nizhnevartovsk	Iskra Odintsovo	-
1994	CSKA Moscow	Izumrud Yekaterinburg	-
1995	Belogorie Belgorod	Avtomobilist Saint Petersburg	-
1996	Belogorie Belgorod	—	-
1997	Dynamo Belgorod	Iskra Odintsovo	-
1998	Dynamo Belgorod	Izumrud Yekaterinburg	-
1999	Izumrud Yekaterinburg	Ural Ufa	-
2000	Izumrud Yekaterinburg	Prikamye Perm	-
2001	Izumrud Yekaterinburg	Prikamye Perm	3 : 0
2002	Iskra Odintsovo	Izumrud Yekaterinburg	3 : 1
2003	Lokomotiv Belgorod	Dynamo Moscow	3 : 2
2004	Dynamo Kazan	Dynamo Moscow	3 : 0
2005	Lokomotiv Belgorod	Iskra Odintsovo	3 : 1
2006	Dynamo Moscow	Fakel Novy Urengoy	3 : 0
2007	Dynamo Kazan	Dynamo Moscow	3 : 2
2008	Dynamo Moscow	Iskra Odintsovo	3 : 1
2009	Zenit Kazan	Lokomotiv Novosibirsk	3 : 2
2010	Lokomotiv Novosibirsk	Dynamo Moscow	3 : 1
2011	Lokomotiv Novosibirsk	Kuzbass Kemerovo	3 : 0
2012	Belogorie Belgorod	Zenit Kazan	3 : 1
2013	Belogorie Belgorod	Dynamo Moscow	3 : 0
2014	Zenit Kazan	Lokomotiv Novosibirsk	3 : 0
2015	Zenit Kazan	Belogorie Belgorod	3 : 0
2016	Zenit Kazan	Lokomotiv Novosibirsk	3 : 1
2017	Zenit Kazan	Kuzbass Kemerovo	3 : 2
2018	Zenit Kazan	Zenit Saint Petersburg	3 : 1
2019	Zenit Kazan	Zenit Saint Petersburg	3 : 0
2020	Dynamo Moscow	Zenit Saint Petersburg	3 : 0
2021	Zenit Kazan	Dynamo Moscow	3 : 0
2022	Zenit Kazan	Fakel Novy Urengoy	3 : 0

== Titles by club ==
Rk.	Club	Titles	City	Years Won
1	Zenit Kazan	11	Kazan	2004, 2007, 2009, 2014, 2015, 2016, 2017, 2018, 2019, 2021, 2022
2	VC Belogorie	8	Belgorod	1995, 1996, 1997, 1998, 2003, 2005, 2012, 2013
3	Lokomotiv Ezimrud	3	Ekaterinburg	1999, 2000, 2001
=	Dynamo Moscow	3	Moscow	2006, 2008, 2020
5	Lokomotiv Novosibirsk	2	Novosibirsk	2010, 2011
6	Ugra Samotlor	1	Nizhnevartovsk	1993
=	CSKA Moscow	1	Moscow	1994
=	Iskra Odintsovo	1	Odintsovo	2002
