= VC Iskra Odintsovo =

Russian volleyball club

Iskra Odintsovo
- Full name: Volleyball Club Iskra Odintsovo
- Short name: Iskra
- Founded: 1979
- Ground: Volleyball Sport Complex (Capacity: 3,500)
- Manager: (Russia) Sergei Tsvetnov
- League: Russian Volleyball Super League
- 2008–09: 2

VC Iskra Odintsovo is a professional Volleyball team based in Odintsovo, Russia.

== Palmarès ==
- Russian Volleyball Super League

Runners-up (4) : 1994, 2003, 2008, 2009
Third place (5) : 1999, 2000, 2001, 2006, 2007

- CEV Champions League

Runners-up (1): 2004
Third place (1): 2009

== Notable players ==
- (Russia) Pavel Abramov
- (Russia) Aleksandr Butko
- (Russia) Andrey Egorchev
- (Russia) Pavel Kruglov
- (Russia) Aleksey Kuleshov
- (Russia) Aleksey Spiridonov
- (Russia) Aleksey Verbov
- (Brazil) Giba
- (France) Guillaume Samica
- (Germany) Jochen Schöps
- (Netherlands) Guido Görtzen
- (Serbia) Veljko Petković

== Famous coaches ==
- (Serbia) Zoran Gajić
