= Russian Volleyball Super League =

Professional volleyball league

- Sport: Volleyball
- Founded: 1992; 34 years ago
- No. of teams: 14
- Country: Russia
- Confederation: CEV
- Continent: Europe
- Most recent champions: Zenit-Kazan (11th title)
- Most titles: Zenit-Kazan (11th titles)
- Relegation to: Major League A
- Domestic cups: Russian Cup; Russian SuperCup
- Website: volley.ru

The Russian Volleyball Super League (RVSL) (Russian: Волейбольная суперлига) is the top league of Russian professional volleyball. It was founded in 1992, and it is considered to be the continuer of the Soviet top league, founded in 1933.

== Winners of the Soviet championship ==
- 1933–1936 – Moscow.
- 1938, 1939 – Spartak (Leningrad)
- 1940 – Spartak Moscow
- 1945–1948 – Dynamo Moscow
- 1949, 1950 – VC CDKA Moscow
- 1951 – Dynamo Moscow
- 1952 – VC VVS MVO
- 1953, 1954 – VC CDKA Moscow
- 1955 – VC CSK Moscow
- 1956 – Ukrainian SSR (as part of the Spartakiad of the Peoples of the USSR)
- 1957 – Spartak (Leningrad)
- 1958 – VC CSK Moscow
- 1959 – Leningrad (as part of the Spartakiad of the Peoples of the USSR)
- 1960–1962 – VC CSKA Moscow
- 1963 – Leningrad (as part of the Spartakiad of the Peoples of the USSR)
- 1965, 1966 – VC CSKA Moscow
- 1967 – Ukrainian SSR (as part of the Spartakiad of the Peoples of the USSR)
- 1968 – Kalev Tallinn
- 1969 – Burevestnik Alma-Ata
- 1970–1983 – VC CSKA Moscow
- 1984 – Radiotechnik Riga
- 1985–1991 – VC CSKA Moscow
- 1992 – VC Shakhtar Donetsk

== Teams ==
The following clubs competed in the 2022–23 season:

2020-21 Super League teams location.

Team	Location	Arena	Capacity
Zenit-Kazan	Kazan	Kazan Volleyball Centre	4,570
Zenit SP	Saint Petersburg	Sibur Arena	7,120
Dinamo Moscow	Moscow	Dynamo Sports Palace	5,000
Kuzbass	Kemerovo	Kuzbass Arena	
Lokomotiv Novosibirsk	Novosibirsk	Lokomotiv Arena	5,000
Fakel	Novy Urengoy	DS Zvyozdniy	3,000
Ural Ufa	Ufa	Dynamo Sport Complex	1,000
Belogorie	Belgorod	Belgorod Arena	10,000
Dynamo-LO	Sosnovy Bor		
Yenisei	Krasnoyarsk	Ivan Yarygin Sports Palace	3,347
Gazprom-Ugra	Surgut	Premier Arena	6,080
ASK Nizhny Novgorod	Nizhny Novgorod	DS Zarechye Hall	1,500
Neftyanik Orenburg	Orenburg	Olympics Sport Complex	1,500
Yugra-Samotlor	Nizhnevartovsk	Zal Meždunarodnyh Vstreč	1,000
Nova Novokuybyshevsk	Novokuybyshevsk	МТЛ Арена	2,200
Stroitel Minsk	Minsk	Minsk Sports Palace	3,311

== Champions ==
Year	Gold	Silver	Bronze
1992	Avtomobilist Saint Petersburg	MGTU Moscow	Dynamo Moscow region
1993	Avtomobilist Saint Petersburg	CSKA Moscow	Dynamo Moscow region
1994	CSKA Moscow	Iskra Odintsovo	Samotlor Nizhnevartovsk
1995	CSKA Moscow	Lokomotiv Belgorod	Avtomobilist Saint Petersburg
1996	CSKA Moscow	Belogorie Belgorod	Samotlor Nizhnevartovsk
1997	Belogorie-Dynamo Belgorod	UEM-Izumrud Ekaterinburg	CSKA Moscow
1998	Belogorie-Dynamo Belgorod	UEM-Izumrud Ekaterinburg	CSKA Moscow
1999	UEM-Izumrud Ekaterinburg	Belogorie-Dynamo Belgorod	Iskra-RVSN Odintsovo
2000	Belogorie-Dynamo Belgorod	UEM-Izumrud Ekaterinburg	Iskra-RVSN Odintsovo
2001	MGTU Luzhniki Moscow	UEM-Izumrud Ekaterinburg	Iskra-RVSN Odintsovo
2002	Lokomotiv Belogorie Belgorod	MGTU Luzhniki Moscow	Dynamo MGFSO Olymp Moscow
2003	Lokomotiv Belogorie Belgorod	Iskra Odintsovo	UEM-Izumrud Ekaterinburg
2004	Lokomotiv Belogorie Belgorod	Dynamo Moscow	Zenit-Kazan
2005	Lokomotiv Belogorie Belgorod	Dynamo Moscow	Zenit-Kazan
2006	Dynamo Moscow	Lokomotiv Belogorie Belgorod	Iskra Odintsovo
2007	Zenit-Kazan	Dynamo Moscow	Iskra Odintsovo
2008	Dynamo Moscow	Iskra Odintsovo	Dynamo TatTransGaz Kazan
2009	Zenit Kazan	Iskra Odintsovo	Fakel Novy Urengoy
2010	Zenit Kazan	Lokomotiv Belogorie Belgorod	Dynamo Moscow
2011	Zenit Kazan	Dynamo Moscow	Lokomotiv Belogorie Belgorod
2012	Zenit Kazan	Dynamo Moscow	Iskra Odintsovo
2013	Belogorie Belgorod	Ural Ufa	Zenit Kazan
2014	Zenit Kazan	Lokomotiv Novosibirsk	Belogorie Belgorod
2015	Zenit Kazan	Belogorie Belgorod	Dynamo Moscow
2016	Zenit Kazan	Dynamo Moscow	Belogorie Belgorod
2017	Zenit Kazan	Dynamo Moscow	Lokomotiv Novosibirsk
2018	Zenit Kazan	Zenit Saint Petersburg	Dynamo Moscow
2019	Kuzbass Kemerovo	Zenit Kazan	Fakel Novy Urengoy
2020	Lokomotiv Novosibirsk	Zenit Kazan	Kuzbass Kemerovo
2021	Dynamo Moscow	Zenit Saint Petersburg	Lokomotiv Novosibirsk
2022	Dynamo Moscow	Lokomotiv Novosibirsk	Zenit Kazan
2023	Zenit Kazan	Dynamo Moscow	Lokomotiv Novosibirsk
2024	Zenit Kazan	Dynamo Moscow	Belogorie Belgorod

== Titles by club ==
Club	Winners	Runners-up
Zenit Kazan	12 (2006–07, 2008–09, 2009–10, 2010–11, 2011–12, 2013–14, 2014–15, 2015–16, 2016–17, 2017–18, 2022–23, 2023–24)	2 (2018–19, 2019–20)
Belogorie Belgorod	8 (1996–97, 1997–98, 1999–20, 2001–02, 2002–03, 2003–04, 2004–05, 2012–13)	6 (1994–95, 1995–96, 1998–99, 2005–06, 2009–10, 2014–15)
Dynamo Moscow	4 (2005–06, 2007–08, 2020–21, 2021–22)	9 (2003–04, 2004–05, 2006–07, 2010–11, 2011–12, 2015–16, 2016–17, 2022–23, 2023–24)
CSKA Moscow	3 (1993–94, 1994–95, 1995–96)	1 (1992–93)
Avtomobilist SP	2 (1991–92, 1992–93)	0
UEM-Izumrud Ekaterinburg	1 (1998–99)	4 (1996–97, 1997–98, 1999–00, 2000–01)
MGTU Luzhniki Moscow	1 (2000–01)	2 (1991–92, 2001–02)
Lokomotiv Novosibirsk	1 (2019–20)	2 (2013–14, 2021–22)
Kuzbass Kemerovo	1 (2018–19)	0

== See also ==
- Volleyball in Russia
- Soviet Men's Volleyball Championship
