= 2011 Men's European Volleyball Championship squads =

This article shows all participating team squads at the 2011 Men's European Volleyball Championship, held in Austria and the Czech Republic from 10 to 18 September 2011.

== Austria ==
The following is the Austrian roster in the 2011 Men's European Volleyball Championship.

Head coach:	Michael Warm
Assistant:	Thomas Schroffenegger

No.	Name	Date of birth	2011 club
1	Philipp Kroiss	2 March 1988	(Austria) Aon hotVolleys Vienna
2	Philip Schneider	23 December 1981	(France) Montpellier UC
4	Oliver Binder	10 March 1989	(Austria) Aon hotVolleys Vienna
5	Daniel Gavan	8 May 1977	(Austria) Hypo Tirol Innsbruck
6	Frederick Laure	26 July 1982	(Austria) Hypo Tirol Innsbruck
7	Michael Laimer	15 July 1985	(Austria) Aon hotVolleys Vienna
8	Philip Ichovski	12 December 1991	(Austria) VCA Niederösterreich
9	Thomas Zass	27 November 1989	(Austria) VCA Niederösterreich
10	Matthias Kienbauer	16 May 1983	(Austria) UVRW Arbesbach
11	Marcus Guttmann	9 July 1991	(Austria) VCA Niederösterreich
13	Gerald Reiser	2 June 1980	(Austria) SK Posojilnica Aich-Dob
15	Simon Frühbauer	19 October 1988	(Austria) Aon hotVolleys Vienna
18	Lukas Weber	13 February 1987	(Austria) Hypo Tirol Innsbruck
19	Lorenz Koraimann	7 May 1993	(Austria) Aon hotVolleys Vienna

== Belgium ==
The following is the Belgian roster in the 2011 Men's European Volleyball Championship.

Head coach:	Claudio Gewehr
Assistant:	Emile Rousseaux

No.	Name	Date of birth	2011 club
1	Bram Van den Dries	14 August 1989	(Italy) RPA LuigiBacchi.it San Giustino
2	Yves Kruyner	10 May 1990	(France) AS Cannes Volley-Ball
3	Sam Deroo	29 April 1992	(Belgium) Knack Randstad Roeselare
4	Pieter Coolman	24 April 1989	(Belgium) Prefaxis Menen
5	Frank Depestele	3 September 1977	(Belgium) Knack Randstad Roeselare
6	Stijn Dejonckheere	21 January 1988	(Belgium) Prefaxis Menen
7	Kevin Klinkenberg	4 October 1990	(Belgium) Noliko Maaseik
8	Gertjan Claes	30 March 1985	(Germany) Moerser SC
9	Pieter Verhees	8 December 1989	(Belgium) VC Euphony Asse-Lennik
11	Matthijs Verhanneman	8 December 1988	(Belgium) Knack Randstad Roeselare
12	Gert Van Walle	7 August 1987	(Italy) Lube Banca Macerata
18	Matias Raymaekers	11 May 1982	(Russia) Lokomotiv Novosibirsk

== Bulgaria ==
The following is the Bulgarian roster in the 2011 Men's European Volleyball Championship.

Head coach:	Radostin Stoychev
Assistant:	Camillo Placi

No.	Name	Date of birth	2011 club
1	Georgi Bratoev	21 October 1987	(Russia) VC Tyumen
2	Hristo Tsvetanov	29 March 1978	(Russia) Lokomotiv Yekaterinburg
3	Andrey Zhekov	12 March 1980	(Italy) Copra Morpho Piacenza
4	Vladislav Ivanov	14 March 1987	(Belgium) Noliko Maaseik
6	Matey Kaziyski	23 September 1984	(Italy) Itas Diatec Trentino
7	Todor Skrimov	9 January 1990	(France) Paris Volley
9	Metodi Ananiev	17 February 1986	(Poland) AZS UWM Olsztyn
11	Vladimir Nikolov (C)	3 October 1977	(Italy) Copra Morpho Piacenza
12	Viktor Yosifov	16 October 1985	(Italy) Trenkwalder Modena
13	Martin Bozhilov	11 April 1988	(Bulgaria) VC Marek Union-Ivkoni
14	Teodor Todorov	1 September 1989	(Russia) Gazprom-Ugra Surgut
15	Todor Aleksiev	21 April 1983	(Italy) Acqua Paradiso Monza Brianza
16	Kostadin Gadzhanov	18 March 1986	(Bulgaria) Pirin Razlog
19	Cvetan Sokolov	31 December 1989	(Italy) Itas Diatec Trentino

== Czech Republic ==
The following is the Czech roster in the 2011 Men's European Volleyball Championship.

Head coach:	Jan Svoboda
Assistant:	Milan Hadrava

No.	Name	Date of birth	2011 club
2	Jiří Popelka	11 May 1977	(Italy) Andreoli Latina
3	Radek Mach	28 September 1984	(Czech Republic) Jihostroj České Budějovice
6	Petr Konečný	16 February 1975	(France) Tours VB
7	Aleš Holubec	13 March 1984	(France) Nantes Rezé Métropole Volley
8	Martin Kryštof	11 October 1982	(Germany) Berlin Recycling Volleys
9	Ondřej Hudeček (C)	9 May 1981	(France) Montpellier UC
11	Michal Hrazdíra	21 October 1985	(Poland) AZS Częstochowa
12	Jakub Veselý	2 September 1986	(France) Arago de Sète
13	Jiří Bence	8 May 1985	(Czech Republic) VO Příbram
14	Petr Zapletal	20 December 1977	(Czech Republic) VSC Zlín
15	Jan Štokr	16 January 1983	(Italy) Itas Diatec Trentino
16	Peter Pláteník	16 March 1981	(Russia) Dinamo Krasnodar
17	David Konečný	10 October 1982	(France) Tours VB
18	Lukáš Ticháček	12 January 1982	(Germany) VfB Friedrichshafen

== Estonia ==
The following is the Estonian roster in the 2011 Men's European Volleyball Championship.

Head coach:	Avo Keel
Assistant:	Boriss Kolčins

No.	Name	Date of birth	2011 club
1	Raimo Pajusalu	1 February 1981	(France) Rennes Volley 35
2	Martti Keel	30 January 1992	(Estonia) Selver Tallinn
3	Keith Pupart	19 March 1985	(France) Rennes Volley 35
4	Ardo Kreek	7 August 1986	(Poland) AZS Politechnika Warszawska
5	Kert Toobal (C)	3 June 1979	(Poland) AZS UWM Olsztyn
6	Sten Esna	24 August 1982	
7	Argo Meresaar	13 January 1980	(Estonia) Selver Tallinn
8	Meelis Kivisild	28 July 1990	(Estonia) Selver Tallinn
10	Asko Esna	1 May 1986	(Estonia) Selver Tallinn
11	Oliver Venno	23 May 1990	(Germany) VfB Friedrichshafen
12	Janis Sirelpuu	14 August 1977	
16	Eerik Jago	29 December 1980	(Austria) Tirol Innsbruck
17	Martti Rosenblatt	29 December 1987	(Estonia) Selver Tallinn
18	Jaanus Nõmmsalu	19 January 1981	(Estonia) Pärnu VK

== Finland ==
The following is the Finnish roster in the 2011 Men's European Volleyball Championship.

Head coach:	Mauro Berruto
Assistant:	Andrea Brogioni

No.	Name	Date of birth	2011 club
2	Eemi Tervaportti	26 July 1989	(France) Avignon Volley-Ball
3	Mikko Esko	3 September 1978	(Italy) Trenkwalder Modena
5	Antti Siltala	14 March 1984	(Poland) Delecta Bydgoszcz
6	Tuomas Sammelvuo (C)	16 February 1976	(Russia) Lokomotiv Novosibirsk
7	Matti Hietanen	3 January 1983	(Italy) RPA LuigiBacchi.it San Giustino
8	Jari Tuominen	24 September 1986	(France) Chaumont Volley-Ball 52
10	Urpo Sivula	15 March 1988	(Italy) Edilesse Conad Reggio Emilia
11	Jesse Mäntylä	22 November 1987	(Finland) Salon Piivolley
12	Olli Kunnari	2 February 1982	(Turkey) İstanbul Büyükşehir Belediyesi
13	Mikko Oivanen	26 May 1986	(Turkey) İstanbul Büyükşehir Belediyesi
14	Konstantin Shumov	15 February 1985	(Italy) Acqua Paradiso Monza Brianza
15	Matti Oivanen	26 May 1986	(Italy) Volley Forlì
18	Jukka Lehtonen	22 February 1982	(France) GFCO Ajaccio
19	Pasi Hyvärinen	22 November 1987	(France) GFCO Ajaccio

== France ==
The following is the French roster in the 2011 Men's European Volleyball Championship.

Head coach:	Philippe Blain
Assistant:	Jocelyn Trillon

No.	Name	Date of birth	2011 club
1	José Trèfle	16 January 1980	(France) Rennes Volley 35
2	Jenia Grebennikov	13 August 1990	(France) Rennes Volley 35
3	Gérald Hardy-Dessources	9 February 1983	(France) AS Cannes Volley-Ball
4	Antonin Rouzier	18 August 1986	(France) Stade Poitevin Poitiers
5	Romain Vadeleux	12 February 1983	(Italy) Lube Banca Macerata
6	Benjamin Toniutti	30 October 1989	(France) Arago de Sète
7	Nicolas Maréchal	4 March 1987	(France) Stade Poitevin Poitiers
8	Marien Moreau	25 October 1983	(France) AS Cannes Volley-Ball
11	Julien Lyneel	15 April 1990	(France) Montpellier UC
12	Earvin N'Gapeth	12 February 1991	(France) Tours VB
13	Pierre Pujol (C)	13 July 1984	(Italy) Sisley Treviso
15	Samuel Tuia	24 July 1986	(Poland) AZS UWM Olsztyn
17	Franck Lafitte	8 March 1989	(France) Montpellier UC
18	Jean-François Exiga	9 March 1982	(Italy) Acqua Paradiso Monza Brianza

== Germany ==
The following is the German roster in the 2011 Men's European Volleyball Championship.

Head coach:	Raúl Lozano
Assistant:	Juan Manuel Serramalera

No.	Name	Date of birth	2011 club
1	Marcus Popp	23 September 1981	(Italy) Copra Morpho Piacenza
2	Markus Steuerwald	7 March 1989	(France) Paris Volley
3	Sebastian Schwarz	11 October 1980	(Italy) RPA LuigiBacchi.it San Giustino
5	Björn Andrae (C)	14 May 1981	(Russia) Kuzbass Kemerovo
6	Denys Kaliberda	24 June 1990	(Germany) Generali Unterhaching
7	György Grozer	27 December 1984	(Poland) Asseco Resovia Rzeszów
8	Marcus Böhme	25 August 1985	(Germany) VfB Friedrichshafen
9	Stefan Hübner	13 June 1975	(Germany) Evivo Düren
10	Jochen Schöps	8 October 1983	(Russia) Iskra Odintsovo
11	Lukas Kampa	29 November 1986	(Germany) VC Bottrop 90
12	Ferdinand Tille	8 December 1988	(Germany) Generali Unterhaching
14	Robert Kromm	9 March 1984	(Russia) Ural Ufa
15	Max Günthör	9 August 1985	(Germany) Generali Unterhaching
17	Patrick Steuerwald	3 March 1986	(Italy) RPA LuigiBacchi.it San Giustino

== Italy ==
The following is the Italian roster in the 2011 Men's European Volleyball Championship.

Head coach:	Mauro Berruto
Assistant:	Andrea Brogioni

No.	Name	Date of birth	2011 club
1	Luigi Mastrangelo	17 August 1975	(Italy) Bre Banca Lannutti Cuneo
3	Simone Parodi	16 June 1986	(Italy) Bre Banca Lannutti Cuneo
4	Andrea Bari	5 March 1980	(Italy) Itas Diatec Trentino
6	Rocco Barone	14 December 1987	(Italy) Tonno Callipo Vibo Valentia
7	Michal Lasko	11 March 1981	(Italy) Marmi Lanza Verona
8	Gabriele Maruotti	25 March 1988	(Italy) Sisley Treviso
9	Ivan Zaytsev	2 October 1988	(Italy) M. Roma Volley
10	Dante Boninfante	7 March 1977	(Italy) Sisley Treviso
11	Cristian Savani (C)	22 February 1982	(Italy) Lube Banca Macerata
12	Simone Buti	19 September 1983	(Italy) Pallavolo Pineto
13	Dragan Travica	28 August 1986	(Italy) Acqua Paradiso Monza Brianza
14	Andrea Giovi	19 August 1983	(Italy) RPA LuigiBacchi.it San Giustino
15	Emanuele Birarelli	8 February 1981	(Italy) Itas Diatec Trentino
18	Giulio Sabbi	10 August 1989	(Italy) Fenice Isernia

== Poland ==
The following is the Polish roster in the 2011 Men's European Volleyball Championship.

Head coach:	Andrea Anastasi
Assistant:	Andrea Gardini

No.	Name	Date of birth	2011 club
1	Piotr Nowakowski	18 December 1987	(Poland) AZS Częstochowa
2	Paweł Zatorski	21 June 1990	(Poland) PGE Skra Bełchatów
3	Piotr Gruszka (C)	8 March 1977	(Turkey) Halkbank Ankara
4	Grzegorz Kosok	2 March 1986	(Poland) Asseco Resovia Rzeszów
5	Karol Kłos	8 August 1989	(Poland) PGE Skra Bełchatów
6	Bartosz Kurek	29 August 1988	(Poland) PGE Skra Bełchatów
7	Jakub Jarosz	10 February 1987	(Poland) ZAKSA Kędzierzyn-Koźle
10	Mateusz Mika	21 January 1991	(Poland) Asseco Resovia Rzeszów
11	Fabian Drzyzga	3 January 1990	(Poland) AZS Częstochowa
13	Michał Kubiak	23 February 1988	(Poland) AZS Politechnika Warszawska
14	Michał Ruciak	22 August 1983	(Poland) ZAKSA Kędzierzyn-Koźle
15	Łukasz Żygadło	2 August 1979	(Italy) Itas Diatec Trentino
16	Krzysztof Ignaczak	15 May 1978	(Poland) Asseco Resovia Rzeszów
18	Marcin Możdżonek	9 February 1985	(Poland) PGE Skra Bełchatów

== Portugal ==
The following is the Portuguese roster in the 2011 Men's European Volleyball Championship.

Head coach:	Juan Díaz
Assistant:	Hugo Silva

No.	Name	Date of birth	2011 club
2	Carlos Teixeira	11 March 1976	(France) Stade Poitevin Poitiers
3	Manuel Silva	28 December 1973	(Portugal) AJF Bastardo
4	João Malveiro	8 December 1979	(Portugal) Castêlo da Maia GC
7	Ivo Casas	21 September 1992	(Portugal) Leixões SC
8	Tiago Violas	27 March 1989	(Portugal) Castêlo da Maia GC
9	Carlos Fidalgo	16 May 1987	(Netherlands) Twente '05
12	João José (C)	7 June 1978	(Germany) VfB Friedrichshafen
13	Valdir Sequeira	22 November 1981	(Italy) Pallavolo Gela
14	Flavio Cruz	28 August 1982	(Portugal) S.L. Benfica
15	Rui Santos	24 March 1984	(Portugal) Fonte do Bastardo
16	Hugo Gaspar	2 September 1982	(Portugal) S.L. Benfica
18	André Lopes	12 September 1982	(France) Stade Poitevin Poitiers

== Russia ==
The following is the Russian roster in the 2011 Men's European Volleyball Championship.

Head coach:	Vladimir Alekno
Assistant:	Oleg Moliboga

No.	Name	Date of birth	2011 club
1	Dmitry Ilinikh	31 January 1987	(Russia) Lokomotiv Belgorod
2	Maxim Zhigalov	26 July 1989	(Russia) Lokomotiv Belgorod
3	Nikolay Apalikov	26 August 1982	(Russia) Zenit Kazan
4	Taras Khtey (C)	22 May 1982	(Russia) Lokomotiv Belgorod
5	Sergey Grankin	21 January 1985	(Russia) Dinamo Moscow
7	Evgeny Sivozhelez	6 August 1986	(Russia) Fakel Novy Urengoy
8	Denis Biryukov	8 December 1988	(Russia) Lokomotiv Belgorod
9	Aleksandr Sokolov	1 March 1982	(Russia) Fakel Novy Urengoy
12	Aleksandr Butko	18 March 1986	(Russia) Lokomotiv Novosibirsk
13	Dmitry Muserskiy	29 October 1988	(Russia) Lokomotiv Belgorod
14	Dmitry Shcherbinin	10 September 1989	(Russia) Dinamo Moscow
17	Maxim Mikhaylov	19 March 1988	(Russia) Zenit Kazan
18	Aleksandr Volkov	14 February 1985	(Italy) Bre Banca Lannutti Cuneo
19	Valery Komarov	21 March 1980	(Russia) Lokomotiv Novosibirsk

== Serbia ==
The following is the Serbian roster in the 2011 Men's European Volleyball Championship.

Head coach:	Igor Kolaković
Assistant:	Željko Bulatović

No.	Name	Date of birth	2011 club
1	Nikola Kovačević	14 February 1983	(Italy) Andreoli Latina
2	Uroš Kovačević	3 May 1993	(Slovenia) ACH Volley Ljubljana
5	Vlado Petković	6 January 1983	(Slovenia) ACH Volley Ljubljana
6	Miloš Terzić	13 June 1987	(Serbia) Crvena Zvezda Belgrad
7	Predrag Lekić	18 May 1979	(Serbia) Crvena Zvezda Belgrad
8	Filip Vujić	17 September 1989	(Serbia) Crvena Zvezda Belgrad
10	Miloš Nikić	31 March 1986	(Italy) RPA LuigiBacchi.it San Giustino
11	Mihajlo Mitić	17 September 1990	(Serbia) Crvena Zvezda Belgrad
12	Milan Rašić	2 February 1985	(Slovenia) ACH Volley Ljubljana
14	Ivan Miljković (C)	13 September 1979	(Turkey) Fenerbahçe Istanbul
15	Saša Starović	19 October 1988	(Italy) Andreoli Latina
16	Aleksandar Atanasijević	4 September 1991	(Serbia) OK Partizan
17	Marko Podraščanin	29 August 1987	(Italy) Lube Banca Macerata
19	Nikola Rosić	5 August 1984	(Germany) VfB Friedrichshafen

== Slovakia ==
The following is the Slovak roster in the 2011 Men's European Volleyball Championship.

Head coach:	Emanuele Zanini
Assistant:	Marco Fenoglio

No.	Name	Date of birth	2011 club
1	Milan Bencz	5 September 1987	(Italy) M. Roma Volley
3	Emanuel Kohút	21 July 1982	(Italy) Andreoli Latina
6	Róbert Hupka	30 July 1982	(Germany) Generali Unterhaching
7	Peter Michalovič	26 May 1990	(Czech Republic) VK Ostrava
8	Martin Sopko	30 January 1982	(Poland) Delecta Bydgoszcz
9	Roman Ondrušek	6 February 1980	(France) Dunkerque Grand Littoral Volley-Ball
10	Martin Nemec	31 July 1984	(Italy) Pallavolo Città di Castello
11	Branislav Skladaný	16 November 1983	(Germany) Generali Unterhaching
14	Tomáš Kmeť (C)	1 December 1981	(Germany) Generali Unterhaching
15	Juraj Zaťko	5 June 1987	(Germany) VfB Friedrichshafen
16	Richard Nemeč	3 May 1972	(Slovakia) VK Bratislava
18	Lukáš Diviš	20 February 1986	(Poland) Jastrzębski Węgiel

== Slovenia ==
The following is the Slovenian roster in the 2011 Men's European Volleyball Championship.

Head coach:	Veselin Vuković
Assistant:	Tine Sattler

No.	Name	Date of birth	2011 club
1	Andrej Flajs	11 March 1983	(Slovenia) ACH Volley Ljubljana
2	Alen Pajenk	23 April 1986	(Italy) Marmi Lanza Verona
3	Jan Planinc	10 February 1990	(Slovenia) OK Kamnik
4	Rok Satler	4 April 1979	(Slovenia) OK Kranj
5	Alen Šket	28 March 1988	(Slovenia) ACH Volley Ljubljana
6	Mitja Gasparini	26 June 1984	(Poland) Jastrzębski Węgiel
7	Matevž Kamnik	24 November 1987	(Slovenia) ACH Volley Ljubljana
8	Miha Plot	11 May 1987	(Belgium) VC Euphony Asse-Lennik
9	Dejan Vinčič	15 September 1986	(Slovenia) ACH Volley Ljubljana
10	Davor Čebron	24 March 1986	(Austria) Hypo Tirol Innsbruck
11	Vid Jakopin	2 January 1988	(Slovenia) ACH Volley Ljubljana
12	Sebastijan Škorc	12 February 1974	(Montenegro) Budvanska Rivijera Budva
13	Tine Urnaut (C)	3 September 1988	(Poland) ZAKSA Kędzierzyn-Koźle
14	Dragan Radović	29 January 1979	(Belgium) Noliko Maaseik

== Turkey ==
The following is the Turkish roster in the 2011 Men's European Volleyball Championship.

Head coach:	Veljko Basič
Assistant:	Hakan Özkan

No.	Name	Date of birth	2011 club
1	Selçuk Keskin	15 January 1982	(Turkey) Halkbank Ankara
3	Ahmet Pezük	6 August 1987	(Turkey) Galatasaray Istanbul
6	Kemal Kayhan	2 January 1983	(Turkey) Fenerbahçe Grundig
7	Sinan Cem Tanık (C)	19 June 1980	(Turkey) Galatasaray Istanbul
8	Burutay Subaşı	15 July 1990	(Turkey) Arkas Izmir
9	Serhat Çoşkun	18 July 1986	(Turkey) Halkbank Ankara
10	Arslan Ekşi	17 July 1985	(Turkey) Fenerbahçe Grundig
12	Halil Yücel	17 July 1985	(Turkey) Halkbank Ankara
14	Erhan Dünge	4 February 1980	(Turkey) Galatasaray Istanbul
15	Emre Batur	21 April 1988	(Turkey) Fenerbahçe Grundig
17	Ender Kidoglu	10 April 1978	(Turkey) Halkbank Ankara
18	Ramazan Kılıç	31 May 1984	(Turkey) Fenerbahçe Grundig
