= 2010–11 Men's Volleyball Serie A1 =

- League: Italian Volleyball League
- Sport: Men's volleyball
- Duration: 24 October 2010 – 15 May 2011
- Teams: 14
- League champions: Trentino Volley (2nd title)
- Top scorer: Saša Starović

Italian Volleyball League seasons
- 2009–10 2011–12

The 2010–11 Serie A1 is the 66th season of Italian Championship (Italian Volleyball League) organized under the supervision of Federazione Italiana Pallavolo.

== Teams ==
| Team | City and Region | Venue | Seasons in A1 |
|---|---|---|---|
| Acqua Paradiso Monza Brianza | Monza, Lombardy | PalaIper | 24 |
| Andreoli Latina | Latina, Lazio | PalaBianchini | 9 |
| BCC N.E.P. Castellana Grotte | Castellana Grotte, Apulia | PalaGrotte | 1 |
| Bre Banca Lannutti Cuneo | Cuneo, Piedmont | PalaBreBanca | 22 |
| Casa Modena | Modena, Emilia-Romagna | PalaPanini | 43 |
| Copra Morpho Piacenza | Piacenza, Emilia-Romagna | PalaBanca | 9 |
| Itas Diatec Trentino | Trento, Trentino-Alto Adige/Südtirol | PalaTrento | 11 |
| Lube Banca Marche Macerata | Macerata, Marche | PalaFontescodella | 16 |
| M. Roma Volley | Rome, Lazio | Palazzetto dello sport | 3 |
| Marmi Lanza Verona | Verona, Veneto | PalaOlimpia | 7 |
| RPA LuigiBacchi.it San Giustino | San Giustino, Umbria | PalaKemon | 9 |
| Sisley Treviso | Treviso, Veneto | PalaVerde | 23 |
| Tonno Callipo Vibo Valentia | Vibo Valentia, Calabria | PalaValentia | 6 |
| Yoga Forlì | Forlì, Emilia-Romagna | PalaFiera | 6 |

2010–11 Serie A1 team distribution

== Champions ==
- Italian Championship A1: Itas Diatec Trentino
- Italian Cup A1: Bre Banca Lannutti Cuneo
- Italian Supercup A1: Bre Banca Lannutti Cuneo

== European cups qualification ==
- 2011–12 CEV Champions League (3): Itas Diatec Trentino, Bre Banca Lannutti Cuneo, Lube Banca Marche Macerata
- 2011–12 CEV Cup (1): Acqua Paradiso Monza Brianza
- 2011–12 CEV Challenge Cup (1): Casa Modena

== Italian supercup A1 ==
- Venue: PalaRuffini, Turin, Piedmont

| Date | Time | | Score | | Set 1 | Set 2 | Set 3 | Set 4 | Set 5 | Total | Report |
|---|---|---|---|---|---|---|---|---|---|---|---|
| 29 Dec | 20:30 | Bre Banca Lannutti Cuneo | 3–0 | Itas Diatec Trentino | 25–20 | 25–23 | 25–22 | | | 75–65 | |

== Italian cup A1 ==
=== Regular season 1st half ===
| Pos | Team | Pld | W | L | Pts | SW | SL | SR | SPW | SPL | SPR |
|---|---|---|---|---|---|---|---|---|---|---|---|
| 1 | Itas Diatec Trentino | 13 | 13 | 0 | 38 | 39 | 3 | 13.000 | 1034 | 849 | 1.218 |
| 2 | Bre Banca Lannutti Cuneo | 13 | 10 | 3 | 30 | 33 | 14 | 2.357 | 1104 | 992 | 1.113 |
| 3 | Lube Banca Marche Macerata | 13 | 10 | 3 | 30 | 35 | 16 | 2.188 | 1181 | 1068 | 1.106 |
| 4 | Casa Modena | 13 | 10 | 3 | 23 | 30 | 24 | 1.250 | 1206 | 1187 | 1.016 |
| 5 | Sisley Treviso | 13 | 7 | 6 | 23 | 29 | 24 | 1.208 | 1215 | 1178 | 1.031 |
| 6 | Tonno Callipo Vibo Valentia | 13 | 7 | 6 | 21 | 23 | 24 | 0.958 | 1060 | 1069 | 0.992 |
| 7 | RPA LuigiBacchi.it San Giustino | 13 | 7 | 6 | 20 | 24 | 22 | 1.091 | 1038 | 1071 | 0.969 |
| 8 | Acqua Paradiso Monza Brianza | 13 | 6 | 7 | 20 | 23 | 25 | 0.920 | 1083 | 1061 | 1.021 |
| 9 | M. Roma Volley | 13 | 6 | 7 | 19 | 25 | 29 | 0.862 | 1178 | 1210 | 0.974 |
| 10 | Copra Morpho Piacenza | 13 | 6 | 7 | 17 | 24 | 28 | 0.857 | 1172 | 1178 | 0.995 |
| 11 | Marmi Lanza Verona | 13 | 4 | 9 | 14 | 21 | 32 | 0.656 | 1177 | 1244 | 0.946 |
| 12 | Andreoli Latina | 13 | 3 | 10 | 11 | 19 | 32 | 0.594 | 1098 | 1166 | 0.942 |
| 13 | BCC N.E.P. Castellana Grotte | 13 | 1 | 12 | 4 | 11 | 37 | 0.297 | 1066 | 1178 | 0.905 |
| 14 | Yoga Forlì | 13 | 1 | 12 | 3 | 11 | 37 | 0.297 | 1004 | 1165 | 0.862 |

=== Final round ===
Quarterfinals
1 | Trentino | 3
8 | Monza | 0
4 | Modena | 1
5 | Treviso | 3
2 | Cuneo | 3
7 | San Giustino | 0
3 | Macerata | 3
6 | Vibo Valentia | 1

Semifinals
1 | Trentino | 3
5 | Treviso | 0
2 | Cuneo | 3
3 | Macerata | 2

Final
1 | Trentino | 0
2 | Cuneo | 3

==== Quarterfinals ====
| Date | Time | | Score | | Set 1 | Set 2 | Set 3 | Set 4 | Set 5 | Total | Report |
|---|---|---|---|---|---|---|---|---|---|---|---|
| 19 Jan | 20:30 | Itas Diatec Trentino | 3–0 | Acqua Paradiso Monza Brianza | 25–17 | 25–16 | 25–19 | | | 75–52 | |
| 19 Jan | 20:30 | Casa Modena | 1–3 | Sisley Treviso | 20–25 | 35–33 | 28–30 | 16–25 | | 99–113 | |
| 19 Jan | 20:30 | Bre Banca Lannutti Cuneo | 3–0 | RPA LuigiBacchi.it San Giustino | 25–10 | 25–16 | 26–24 | | | 76–50 | |
| 19 Jan | 20:30 | Lube Banca Marche Macerata | 3–1 | Tonno Callipo Vibo Valentia | 25–27 | 25–17 | 25–17 | 25–20 | | 100–81 | |

==== Semifinals ====
- Venue: PalaOlimpia, Verona, Veneto

| Date | Time | | Score | | Set 1 | Set 2 | Set 3 | Set 4 | Set 5 | Total | Report |
|---|---|---|---|---|---|---|---|---|---|---|---|
| 22 Jan | 15:30 | Itas Diatec Trentino | 3–0 | Sisley Treviso | 25–21 | 25–19 | 25–19 | | | 75–59 | |
| 22 Jan | 18:00 | Bre Banca Lannutti Cuneo | 3–2 | Lube Banca Marche Macerata | 25–19 | 16–25 | 29–27 | 23–25 | 15–13 | 108–109 | |

==== Final ====
- Venue: PalaOlimpia, Verona, Veneto

| Date | Time | | Score | | Set 1 | Set 2 | Set 3 | Set 4 | Set 5 | Total | Report |
|---|---|---|---|---|---|---|---|---|---|---|---|
| 23 Jan | 18:00 | Itas Diatec Trentino | 0–3 | Bre Banca Lannutti Cuneo | 17–25 | 19–25 | 22–25 | | | 58–75 | |

== Italian championship A1 ==
=== Regular season ===
| Pos | Team | Pld | W | L | Pts | SW | SL | SR | SPW | SPL | SPR |
|---|---|---|---|---|---|---|---|---|---|---|---|
| 1 | Itas Diatec Trentino | 26 | 25 | 1 | 72 | 76 | 13 | 5.846 | 2169 | 1813 | 1.196 |
| 2 | Bre Banca Lannutti Cuneo | 26 | 20 | 6 | 61 | 69 | 31 | 2.226 | 2343 | 2115 | 1.108 |
| 3 | Lube Banca Marche Macerata | 26 | 16 | 10 | 51 | 63 | 43 | 1.465 | 2374 | 2258 | 1.051 |
| 4 | Acqua Paradiso Monza Brianza | 26 | 14 | 12 | 44 | 52 | 47 | 1.106 | 2258 | 2209 | 1.022 |
| 5 | Casa Modena | 26 | 17 | 9 | 43 | 58 | 49 | 1.184 | 2408 | 2395 | 1.005 |
| 6 | Sisley Treviso | 26 | 14 | 12 | 42 | 54 | 49 | 1.102 | 2347 | 2298 | 1.021 |
| 7 | Marmi Lanza Verona | 26 | 12 | 14 | 37 | 48 | 56 | 0.857 | 2328 | 2388 | 0.975 |
| 8 | RPA LuigiBacchi.it San Giustino | 26 | 12 | 14 | 35 | 46 | 49 | 0.939 | 2136 | 2210 | 0.967 |
| 9 | Tonno Callipo Vibo Valentia | 26 | 11 | 15 | 34 | 44 | 56 | 0.786 | 2198 | 2283 | 0.963 |
| 10 | Copra Morpho Piacenza | 26 | 10 | 16 | 30 | 44 | 60 | 0.733 | 2325 | 2381 | 0.976 |
| 11 | M. Roma Volley | 26 | 9 | 17 | 30 | 44 | 63 | 0.698 | 2349 | 2430 | 0.967 |
| 12 | Andreoli Latina | 26 | 9 | 17 | 29 | 43 | 59 | 0.729 | 2274 | 2367 | 0.961 |
| 13 | BCC N.E.P. Castellana Grotte | 26 | 10 | 16 | 28 | 42 | 60 | 0.700 | 2298 | 2367 | 0.971 |
| 14 | Yoga Forlì | 26 | 3 | 23 | 10 | 26 | 74 | 0.351 | 2074 | 2367 | 0.876 |

=== Playoffs ===
Quarterfinals
1 | Trentino | 3 | 3 | 3
8 | San Giustino | 0 | 1 | 0
4 | Monza | 3 | 0 | 3 | 0 | 0
5 | Modena | 1 | 3 | 2 | 3 | 3
2 | Cuneo | 3 | 3 | 3
7 | Verona | 0 | 2 | 0
3 | Macerata | 3 | 3 | 2 | 1 | 3
6 | Treviso | 0 | 1 | 3 | 3 | 0

Semifinals
1 | Trentino | 3 | 0 | 3 | 1 | 3
5 | Modena | 0 | 3 | 0 | 3 | 1
2 | Cuneo | 3 | 1 | 2 | 3 | 3
3 | Macerata | 1 | 3 | 3 | 1 | 2

Final
1 | Trentino | 3
2 | Cuneo | 0

==== Quarterfinals ====
===== Itas Diatec Trentino (1) 3:0 RPA LuigiBacchi.it San Giustino (8) =====
| Date | Time | | Score | | Set 1 | Set 2 | Set 3 | Set 4 | Set 5 | Total | Report |
|---|---|---|---|---|---|---|---|---|---|---|---|
| 7 Apr | 20:30 | Itas Diatec Trentino | 3–0 | RPA LuigiBacchi.it San Giustino | 25–22 | 25–17 | 25–21 | | | 75–60 | |
| 10 Apr | 18:00 | RPA LuigiBacchi.it San Giustino | 1–3 | Itas Diatec Trentino | 25–21 | 19–25 | 14–25 | 16–25 | | 74–96 | |
| 14 Apr | 20:30 | Itas Diatec Trentino | 3–0 | RPA LuigiBacchi.it San Giustino | 25–17 | 25–21 | 25–16 | | | 75–54 | |

===== Casa Modena (5) 3:2 Acqua Paradiso Monza Brianza (4) =====
| Date | Time | | Score | | Set 1 | Set 2 | Set 3 | Set 4 | Set 5 | Total | Report |
|---|---|---|---|---|---|---|---|---|---|---|---|
| 6 Apr | 20:30 | Acqua Paradiso Monza Brianza | 3–1 | Casa Modena | 25–17 | 25–17 | 19–25 | 27–25 | | 96–84 | |
| 9 Apr | 16:00 | Casa Modena | 3–0 | Acqua Paradiso Monza Brianza | 25–18 | 29–27 | 25–15 | | | 79–60 | |
| 13 Apr | 20:30 | Acqua Paradiso Monza Brianza | 3–2 | Casa Modena | 25–16 | 17–25 | 22–25 | 25–22 | 15–12 | 104–100 | |
| 16 Apr | 16:00 | Casa Modena | 3–0 | Acqua Paradiso Monza Brianza | 25–15 | 25–21 | 25–22 | | | 75–58 | |
| 20 Apr | 20:30 | Acqua Paradiso Monza Brianza | 0–3 | Casa Modena | 23–25 | 24–26 | 20–25 | | | 67–76 | |

===== Bre Banca Lannutti Cuneo (2) 3:0 Marmi Lanza Verona (7) =====
| Date | Time | | Score | | Set 1 | Set 2 | Set 3 | Set 4 | Set 5 | Total | Report |
|---|---|---|---|---|---|---|---|---|---|---|---|
| 7 Apr | 20:30 | Bre Banca Lannutti Cuneo | 3–0 | Marmi Lanza Verona | 25–19 | 25–20 | 25–18 | | | 75–57 | |
| 10 Apr | 18:00 | Marmi Lanza Verona | 2–3 | Bre Banca Lannutti Cuneo | 23–25 | 20–25 | 25–17 | 25–15 | 13–15 | 106–97 | |
| 14 Apr | 20:30 | Bre Banca Lannutti Cuneo | 3–0 | Marmi Lanza Verona | 25–19 | 25–19 | 25–21 | | | 75–59 | |

===== Lube Banca Marche Macerata (3) 3:2 Sisley Treviso (6) =====
| Date | Time | | Score | | Set 1 | Set 2 | Set 3 | Set 4 | Set 5 | Total | Report |
|---|---|---|---|---|---|---|---|---|---|---|---|
| 6 Apr | 20:30 | Lube Banca Marche Macerata | 3–0 | Sisley Treviso | 25–16 | 26–24 | 25–22 | | | 76–62 | |
| 10 Apr | 18:00 | Sisley Treviso | 1–3 | Lube Banca Marche Macerata | 27–29 | 15–25 | 25–16 | 22–25 | | 89–95 | |
| 13 Apr | 20:30 | Lube Banca Marche Macerata | 2–3 | Sisley Treviso | 21–25 | 17–25 | 28–26 | 26–24 | 9–15 | 101–115 | |
| 18 Apr | 20:30 | Sisley Treviso | 3–1 | Lube Banca Marche Macerata | 25–18 | 21–25 | 30–28 | 25–22 | | 101–93 | |
| 21 Apr | 20:30 | Lube Banca Marche Macerata | 3–0 | Sisley Treviso | 25–19 | 25–18 | 25–20 | | | 75–57 | |

==== Semifinals ====
===== Itas Diatec Trentino (1) 3:2 Casa Modena (5) =====
| Date | Time | | Score | | Set 1 | Set 2 | Set 3 | Set 4 | Set 5 | Total | Report |
|---|---|---|---|---|---|---|---|---|---|---|---|
| 25 Apr | 18:00 | Itas Diatec Trentino | 3–0 | Casa Modena | 25–15 | 25–14 | 25–18 | | | 75–47 | |
| 28 Apr | 20:30 | Casa Modena | 3–0 | Itas Diatec Trentino | 25–21 | 25–23 | 25–8 | | | 75–52 | |
| 1 May | 18:00 | Itas Diatec Trentino | 3–0 | Casa Modena | 31–29 | 26–24 | 25–21 | | | 82–74 | |
| 5 May | 20:30 | Casa Modena | 3–1 | Itas Diatec Trentino | 25–21 | 25–19 | 22–25 | 25–23 | | 97–88 | |
| 8 May | 18:00 | Itas Diatec Trentino | 3–1 | Casa Modena | 25–23 | 28–30 | 25–22 | 25–11 | | 103–86 | |

===== Bre Banca Lannutti Cuneo (2) 3:2 Lube Banca Marche Macerata (3) =====
| Date | Time | | Score | | Set 1 | Set 2 | Set 3 | Set 4 | Set 5 | Total | Report |
|---|---|---|---|---|---|---|---|---|---|---|---|
| 24 Apr | 18:00 | Bre Banca Lannutti Cuneo | 3–1 | Lube Banca Marche Macerata | 15–25 | 25–23 | 25–17 | 25–21 | | 90–86 | |
| 27 Apr | 20:30 | Lube Banca Marche Macerata | 3–1 | Bre Banca Lannutti Cuneo | 25–23 | 32–30 | 17–25 | 25–19 | | 99–97 | |
| 30 Apr | 16:00 | Bre Banca Lannutti Cuneo | 2–3 | Lube Banca Marche Macerata | 25–23 | 23–25 | 22–25 | 25–20 | 14–16 | 109–109 | |
| 4 May | 20:30 | Lube Banca Marche Macerata | 1–3 | Bre Banca Lannutti Cuneo | 23–25 | 25–23 | 23–25 | 18–25 | | 89–98 | |
| 8 May | 18:15 | Bre Banca Lannutti Cuneo | 3–2 | Lube Banca Marche Macerata | 22–25 | 25–20 | 22–25 | 25–23 | 15–12 | 109–105 | |

==== Final ====
===== Itas Diatec Trentino (1) 1:0 Bre Banca Lannutti Cuneo (2) =====
- Venue: PalaLottomatica, Rome, Lazio

| Date | Time | | Score | | Set 1 | Set 2 | Set 3 | Set 4 | Set 5 | Total | Report |
|---|---|---|---|---|---|---|---|---|---|---|---|
| 15 May | 18:00 | Itas Diatec Trentino | 3–0 | Bre Banca Lannutti Cuneo | 25–13 | 25–22 | 25–9 | | | 75–44 | |
