= 2011–12 Men's Volleyball Serie A1 =

- League: Italian Volleyball League
- Sport: Men's volleyball
- Duration: September 25, 2011 – April 22, 2012
- Teams: 14
- League champions: Lube Banca Macerata (2nd title)
- Top scorer: Ivan Zaytsev

Italian Volleyball League seasons
- 2010–11 2012–13

2011–12 Serie A1 is the 67th season of Italian Championship (Italian Volleyball League) organized under the supervision of Federazione Italiana Pallavolo.

== Teams ==
Team	City and Region	Venue	Seasons in A1
Acqua Paradiso Monza Brianza	Monza, Lombardy	PalaIper	25
Andreoli Latina	Latina, Lazio	PalaBianchini	10
Bre Banca Lannutti Cuneo	Cuneo, Piedmont	PalaBreBanca	23
Casa Modena	Modena, Emilia-Romagna	PalaPanini	44
CMC Ravenna	Ravenna, Emilia-Romagna	Pala De André	1
Copra Elior Piacenza	Piacenza, Emilia-Romagna	PalaBanca	10
Energy Resources San Giustino	San Giustino, Umbria	PalaKemon	10
Fidia Padova	Padua, Veneto	PalaFabris	28
Itas Diatec Trentino	Trento, Trentino-Alto Adige/Südtirol	PalaTrento	12
Lube Banca Marche Macerata	Macerata, Marche	PalaFontescodella	17
M. Roma Volley	Rome, Lazio	Palazzetto dello sport	4
Marmi Lanza Verona	Verona, Veneto	PalaOlimpia	8
Sisley Belluno	Belluno, Veneto	Spes Arena	24
Tonno Callipo Vibo Valentia	Vibo Valentia, Calabria	PalaValentia	7

== Champions ==
- Italian Championship A1: Lube Banca Marche Macerata
- Italian Cup A1: Itas Diatec Trentino
- Italian Supercup A1: Itas Diatec Trentino

== European cups qualification ==
- 2012–13 CEV Champions League (3): Lube Banca Marche Macerata, Itas Diatec Trentino, Bre Banca Lannutti Cuneo
- 2012–13 CEV Cup (1): Andreoli Latina
- 2012–13 CEV Challenge Cup (1): Copra Elior Piacenza

== Italian supercup A1 ==
- Venue: PalaRockefeller, Cagliari, Sardinia

Date	Time		Score		Set 1	Set 2	Set 3	Set 4	Set 5	Total	Report
01 Nov	18:00	Itas Diatec Trentino	3–1	Bre Banca Lannutti Cuneo	25–22	25–20	18–25	25–20		93–87	

== Italian cup A1 ==
=== Regular season 1st half ===
Pos	Team	Pld	W	L	Pts	SW	SL	SR	SPW	SPL	SPR
1	Lube Banca Marche Macerata	13	12	1	32	37	15	2.467	1232	1100	1.120
2	Itas Diatec Trentino	13	11	2	32	36	13	2.769	1169	1012	1.155
3	Bre Banca Lannutti Cuneo	13	11	2	31	37	17	2.176	1234	1125	1.097
4	Casa Modena	13	10	3	27	33	19	1.737	1182	1093	1.081
5	Acqua Paradiso Monza Brianza	13	8	5	21	26	26	1.000	1119	1148	0.975
6	Sisley Belluno	13	5	8	19	26	25	1.040	1138	1130	1.007
7	Tonno Callipo Vibo Valentia	13	6	7	17	23	28	0.821	1157	1160	0.997
8	M. Roma Volley	13	6	7	17	22	27	0.815	1082	1104	0.980
9	Andreoli Latina	13	5	8	17	25	28	0.893	1168	1179	0.991
10	Fidia Padova	13	4	9	14	20	30	0.667	1086	1161	0.935
11	Marmi Lanza Verona	13	4	9	14	21	33	0.636	1137	1239	0.918
12	Energy Resources San Giustino	13	4	9	12	21	34	0.618	1159	1245	0.931
13	Copra Elior Piacenza	13	3	10	12	19	32	0.594	1079	1130	0.955
14	CMC Ravenna	13	2	11	8	15	34	0.441	1049	1165	0.900

=== Final round ===
Quarterfinals
1	Macerata	3
8	Roma	0
4	Modena	3
5	Monza	1
2	Trentino	3
7	Vibo Valentia	0
3	Cuneo	1
6	Belluno	3

Semifinals
1	Macerata	3
4	Modena	1
2	Trentino	3
6	Belluno	0

Final
1	Macerata	2
2	Trentino	3

==== Quarterfinals ====
Date	Time		Score		Set 1	Set 2	Set 3	Set 4	Set 5	Total	Report
25 Jan	20:30	Lube Banca Marche Macerata	3–0	M. Roma Volley	25–21	25–20	25–19			75–60	
25 Jan	20:30	Casa Modena	3–1	Acqua Paradiso Monza Brianza	35–33	25–21	25–27	25–17		110–98	
25 Jan	20:30	Itas Diatec Trentino	3–0	Tonno Callipo Vibo Valentia	25–15	25–16	25–20			75–51	
25 Jan	20:30	Bre Banca Lannutti Cuneo	1–3	Sisley Belluno	22–25	25–21	16–25	22–25		85–96	

==== Semifinals ====
- Venue: PalaLottomatica, Rome, Lazio

Date	Time		Score		Set 1	Set 2	Set 3	Set 4	Set 5	Total	Report
18 Feb	16:00	Lube Banca Marche Macerata	3–1	Casa Modena	25–14	25–18	22–25	25–22		97–79	
18 Feb	18:30	Itas Diatec Trentino	3–0	Sisley Belluno	25–19	25–18	25–17			75–54	

==== Final ====
- Venue: PalaLottomatica, Rome, Lazio

Date	Time		Score		Set 1	Set 2	Set 3	Set 4	Set 5	Total	Report
19 Feb	17:30	Lube Banca Marche Macerata	2–3	Itas Diatec Trentino	25–21	25–22	22–25	21–25	16–18	109–111	

== Italian championship A1 ==
=== Regular season ===
Pos	Team	Pld	W	L	Pts	SW	SL	SR	SPW	SPL	SPR
1	Itas Diatec Trentino	26	24	2	70	75	19	3.947	2290	1919	1.193
2	Lube Banca Marche Macerata	26	20	6	56	67	36	1.861	2396	2208	1.085
3	Bre Banca Lannutti Cuneo	26	18	8	56	69	39	1.769	2428	2296	1.057
4	Sisley Belluno	26	15	11	47	57	44	1.295	2312	2238	1.033
5	Casa Modena	26	16	10	42	54	47	1.149	2313	2238	1.034
6	Copra Elior Piacenza	26	14	12	42	53	49	1.082	2242	2201	1.019
7	Acqua Paradiso Monza Brianza	26	13	13	39	50	52	0.962	2244	2266	0.990
8	M. Roma Volley	26	11	15	32	45	56	0.804	2265	2286	0.991
9	Andreoli Latina	26	10	16	32	48	59	0.814	2302	2386	0.965
10	Tonno Callipo Vibo Valentia	26	11	15	31	44	58	0.759	2283	2345	0.974
11	Marmi Lanza Verona	26	9	17	29	42	62	0.677	2228	2405	0.926
12	Energy Resources San Giustino	26	9	17	28	44	64	0.688	2342	2467	0.949
13	Fidia Padova	26	8	18	27	38	59	0.644	2102	2224	0.945
14	CMC Ravenna	26	4	22	15	27	69	0.391	2006	2274	0.882

=== Playoffs ===
==== Quarterfinals ====
===== Group A =====
- Venue: PalaTrento, Trento, Trentino-Alto Adige/Südtirol

Pos	Team	Pld	W	L	Pts	SW	SL	SR	SPW	SPL	SPR
1	Itas Diatec Trentino	2	2	0	6	6	0	MAX	150	116	1.293
2	M. Roma Volley	2	1	1	2	3	5	0.600	163	180	0.906
3	Energy Resources San Giustino	2	0	2	1	2	6	0.333	165	182	0.907

Date	Time		Score		Set 1	Set 2	Set 3	Set 4	Set 5	Total	Report
07 Apr	17:30	Itas Diatec Trentino	3–0	Energy Resources San Giustino	25–23	25–15	25–22			75–60	
08 Apr	18:00	M. Roma Volley	3–2	Energy Resources San Giustino	21–25	25–23	21–25	25–23	15–9	107–105	
09 Apr	18:00	Itas Diatec Trentino	3–0	M. Roma Volley	25–22	25–17	25–17			75–56	

===== Group B =====
- Venue: PalaFontescodella, Macerata, Marche

Pos	Team	Pld	W	L	Pts	SW	SL	SR	SPW	SPL	SPR
1	Lube Banca Marche Macerata	2	2	0	6	6	2	3.000	190	176	1.080
2	Acqua Paradiso Monza Brianza	2	1	1	3	4	4	1.000	185	176	1.051
3	Marmi Lanza Verona	2	0	2	0	2	6	0.333	169	192	0.880

Date	Time		Score		Set 1	Set 2	Set 3	Set 4	Set 5	Total	Report
07 Apr	18:00	Lube Banca Marche Macerata	3–1	Marmi Lanza Verona	21–25	25–21	25–19	25–22		96–87	
08 Apr	18:00	Acqua Paradiso Monza Brianza	3–1	Marmi Lanza Verona	25–23	21–25	25–16	25–18		96–82	
09 Apr	18:00	Lube Banca Marche Macerata	3–1	Acqua Paradiso Monza Brianza	25–18	25–23	19–25	25–23		94–89	

===== Group C =====
- Venue: PalaBreBanca, Cuneo, Piedmont

Pos	Team	Pld	W	L	Pts	SW	SL	SR	SPW	SPL	SPR
1	Bre Banca Lannutti Cuneo	2	2	0	6	6	1	6.000	189	179	1.056
2	Copra Elior Piacenza	2	1	1	3	3	3	1.000	155	145	1.069
3	Tonno Callipo Vibo Valentia	2	0	2	0	1	6	0.167	158	178	0.888

Date	Time		Score		Set 1	Set 2	Set 3	Set 4	Set 5	Total	Report
07 Apr	18:00	Bre Banca Lannutti Cuneo	3–1	Tonno Callipo Vibo Valentia	21–25	25–21	29–27	28–26		103–99	
08 Apr	17:30	Copra Elior Piacenza	3–0	Tonno Callipo Vibo Valentia	25–19	25–20	25–20			75–59	
09 Apr	18:00	Bre Banca Lannutti Cuneo	3–0	Copra Elior Piacenza	26–24	32–30	28–26			86–80	

===== Group D =====
- Venue: Spes Arena, Belluno, Veneto

Pos	Team	Pld	W	L	Pts	SW	SL	SR	SPW	SPL	SPR
1	Andreoli Latina	2	2	0	6	6	1	6.000	172	161	1.068
2	Sisley Belluno	2	1	1	3	3	4	0.750	166	164	1.012
3	Casa Modena	2	0	2	0	2	6	0.333	177	190	0.932

Date	Time		Score		Set 1	Set 2	Set 3	Set 4	Set 5	Total	Report
07 Apr	19:30	Sisley Belluno	0–3	Andreoli Latina	26–28	23–25	21–25			70–78	
08 Apr	18:00	Sisley Belluno	3–1	Casa Modena	25–21	21–25	25–18	25–22		96–86	
09 Apr	17:30	Andreoli Latina	3–1	Casa Modena	19–25	25–20	25–23	25–23		94–91	

==== Challenge cup playoff ====
Semifinals
4	Belluno	3	3	–
8	Roma	0	1	–
6	Piacenza	3	3	–
7	Monza	0	2	–

Final
4	Belluno	0
6	Piacenza	3

===== Semifinals =====
====== Sisley Belluno (4) 2:0 M. Roma Volley (8) ======
Date	Time		Score		Set 1	Set 2	Set 3	Set 4	Set 5	Total	Report
12 Apr	20:30	Sisley Belluno	3–0	M. Roma Volley	25–21	25–16	25–23			75–60	
15 Apr	15:30	M. Roma Volley	1–3	Sisley Belluno	28–26	23–25	23–25	19–25		93–101	

====== Copra Elior Piacenza (6) 2:0 Acqua Paradiso Monza Brianza (7) ======
Date	Time		Score		Set 1	Set 2	Set 3	Set 4	Set 5	Total	Report
12 Apr	20:30	Copra Elior Piacenza	3–0	Acqua Paradiso Monza Brianza	25–18	25–20	25–20			75–58	
15 Apr	18:00	Acqua Paradiso Monza Brianza	2–3	Copra Elior Piacenza	25–23	15–25	28–30	25–21	12–15	105–114	

===== Final =====
====== Copra Elior Piacenza (6) 1:0 Sisley Belluno (4) ======
Date	Time		Score		Set 1	Set 2	Set 3	Set 4	Set 5	Total	Report
21 Apr	18:00	Sisley Belluno	0–3	Copra Elior Piacenza	22–25	21–25	20–25			63–75	

==== Championship ====
Semifinals
1	Trentino	3	3	–
9	Latina	0	0	–
2	Macerata	1	3	3
3	Cuneo	3	2	0

Final
1	Trentino	2
2	Macerata	3

===== Semifinals =====
====== Itas Diatec Trentino (1) 2:0 Andreoli Latina (9) ======
Date	Time		Score		Set 1	Set 2	Set 3	Set 4	Set 5	Total	Report
12 Apr	20:30	Itas Diatec Trentino	3–0	Andreoli Latina	28–26	25–20	25–21			78–67	
15 Apr	16:30	Andreoli Latina	0–3	Itas Diatec Trentino	26–28	13–25	23–25			62–78	

====== Lube Banca Marche Macerata (2) 2:1 Bre Banca Lannutti Cuneo (3) ======
Date	Time		Score		Set 1	Set 2	Set 3	Set 4	Set 5	Total	Report
12 Apr	20:30	Lube Banca Marche Macerata	1–3	Bre Banca Lannutti Cuneo	25–23	22–25	13–25	18–25		78–98	
15 Apr	18:00	Bre Banca Lannutti Cuneo	2–3	Lube Banca Marche Macerata	25–19	23–25	25–18	22–25	13–15	108–102	
18 Apr	20:30	Lube Banca Marche Macerata	3–0	Bre Banca Lannutti Cuneo	25–20	25–17	26–24			76–61	

===== Final =====
====== Lube Banca Marche Macerata (2) 1:0 Itas Diatec Trentino (1) ======
- Venue: Mediolanum Forum, Assago, Lombardy

Date	Time		Score		Set 1	Set 2	Set 3	Set 4	Set 5	Total	Report
22 Apr	17:30	Itas Diatec Trentino	2–3	Lube Banca Marche Macerata	25–19	25–12	22–25	18–25	20–22	110–103	
