= 2009–10 Men's Volleyball Serie A1 =

- League: Italian Volleyball League
- Sport: Men's volleyball
- Duration: 27 September 2009 – 10 May 2010
- Teams: 14
- League champions: Piemonte Volley (1st title)
- Top scorer: Ángel Dennis

Italian Volleyball League seasons
- 2008–09 2010–11

The 2009–10 Serie A1 is the 65th season of Italian Championship (Italian Volleyball League) organized under the supervision of Federazione Italiana Pallavolo.

== Teams ==
Team	City and Region	Venue	Seasons in A1
Acqua Paradiso Monza	Monza, Lombardy	PalaIper	23
Andreoli Latina	Latina, Lazio	PalaBianchini	8
Aran Cucine Abruzzo Pineto	Pineto, Abruzzo	PalaMaggetti	2
Bre Banca Lannutti Cuneo	Cuneo, Piedmont	PalaBreBanca	21
CoprAtlantide Piacenza	Piacenza, Emilia-Romagna	PalaBanca	8
Esse-Ti Carilo Loreto	Loreto, Marche	PalaMassimoSerenelli	4
Itas Diatec Trentino	Trento, Trentino-Alto Adige/Südtirol	PalaTrento	10
Lube Banca Marche Macerata	Macerata, Marche	PalaFontescodella	15
Marmi Lanza Verona	Verona, Veneto	PalaOlimpia	6
Prisma Taranto	Taranto, Apulia	PalaMazzola	7
RPA-LuigiBacchi.it Perugia	Perugia, Umbria	PalaEvangelisti	8
Sisley Treviso	Treviso, Veneto	PalaVerde	22
Tonno Callipo Vibo Valentia	Vibo Valentia, Calabria	PalaValentia	5
Trenkwalder Modena	Modena, Emilia-Romagna	PalaPanini	42
Yoga Forlì	Forlì, Emilia-Romagna	PalaFiera	5

2009–10 Serie A1 team distribution

== Champions ==
- Italian Championship A1: Bre Banca Lannutti Cuneo
- Italian Cup A1: Itas Diatec Trentino
- Italian Supercup A1: CoprAtlantide Piacenza

== European cups qualification ==
- 2010–11 CEV Champions League (3): Bre Banca Lannutti Cuneo, Itas Diatec Trentino, Sisley Treviso
- 2010–11 CEV Cup (1): Trenkwalder Modena
- 2010–11 CEV Challenge Cup (1): Lube Banca Marche Macerata

== Italian supercup A1 ==
- Venue: Palasport "City of Frosinone", Frosinone, Lazio

Date	Time		Score		Set 1	Set 2	Set 3	Set 4	Set 5	Total	Report
20 Sep	18:00	CoprAtlantide Piacenza	3–2	Lube Banca Marche Macerata	25–19	24–26	20–25	25–20	20–18	114–108	

== Italian cup A1 ==
=== Regular season 1st half ===
Pos	Team	Pld	W	L	Pts	SW	SL	SR	SPW	SPL	SPR
1	Itas Diatec Trentino	14	12	2	36	38	12	3.167	1189	1042	1.141
2	Bre Banca Lannutti Cuneo	14	11	3	33	35	14	2.500	1167	1017	1.147
3	Sisley Treviso	14	11	3	29	36	21	1.714	1317	1214	1.085
4	Trenkwalder Modena	14	10	4	29	33	19	1.737	1219	1136	1.073
5	Lube Banca Marche Macerata	14	10	4	28	33	22	1.500	1235	1193	1.035
6	CoprAtlantide Piacenza	14	9	5	28	33	18	1.833	1210	1103	1.097
7	Acqua Paradiso Monza	14	7	7	22	28	25	1.120	1198	1197	1.001
8	RPA-LuigiBacchi.it Perugia	14	7	7	22	29	29	1.000	1297	1293	1.003
9	Marmi Lanza Verona	14	7	7	20	25	28	0.893	1171	1182	0.991
10	Tonno Callipo Vibo Valentia	14	6	8	17	23	29	0.793	1162	1194	0.973
11	Prisma Taranto	14	5	9	16	20	30	0.667	1118	1185	0.943
12	Esse-Ti Carilo Loreto	14	3	11	11	17	36	0.472	1130	1258	0.898
13	Yoga Forlì	14	3	11	10	16	36	0.444	1081	1223	0.884
14	Andreoli Latina	14	2	12	8	16	36	0.444	1141	1243	0.918
15	Aran Cucine Abruzzo Pineto	14	2	12	6	11	38	0.289	994	1149	0.865

=== Final round ===
Quarterfinals
1	Trentino	3
8	Perugia	0
4	Modena	3
5	Macerata	2
2	Cuneo	3
7	Monza	2
3	Treviso	3
6	Piacenza	0

Semifinals
1	Trentino	3
4	Modena	0
2	Cuneo	3
3	Treviso	1

Final
1	Trentino	3
2	Cuneo	1

==== Quarterfinals ====
Date	Time		Score		Set 1	Set 2	Set 3	Set 4	Set 5	Total	Report
30 Dec	20:30	Itas Diatec Trentino	3–0	RPA-LuigiBacchi.it Perugia	25–22	25–19	25–20			75–61	
30 Dec	20:30	Trenkwalder Modena	3–2	Lube Banca Marche Macerata	25–17	23–25	25–21	23–25	15–13	111–101	
30 Dec	20:30	Bre Banca Lannutti Cuneo	3–2	Acqua Paradiso Monza	16–25	21–25	25–17	25–19	15–13	102–99	
30 Dec	20:30	Sisley Treviso	3–0	CoprAtlantide Piacenza	25–21	25–23	25–21			75–65	

==== Semifinals ====
- Venue: Palasport, Montecatini Terme, Tuscany

Date	Time		Score		Set 1	Set 2	Set 3	Set 4	Set 5	Total	Report
30 Jan	15:30	Itas Diatec Trentino	3–0	Trenkwalder Modena	25–22	25–23	25–20			75–65	
30 Jan	18:00	Bre Banca Lannutti Cuneo	3–1	Sisley Treviso	20–25	25–23	25–23	25–13		95–84	

==== Final ====
- Venue: Palasport, Montecatini Terme, Tuscany

Date	Time		Score		Set 1	Set 2	Set 3	Set 4	Set 5	Total	Report
31 Jan	18:00	Itas Diatec Trentino	3–1	Bre Banca Lannutti Cuneo	28–26	25–15	20–25	27–25		100–91	

== Italian championship A1 ==
=== Regular season ===
Pos	Team	Pld	W	L	Pts	SW	SL	SR	SPW	SPL	SPR
1	Itas Diatec Trentino	28	23	5	69	75	27	2.778	2418	2150	1.125
2	Bre Banca Lannutti Cuneo	28	22	6	65	70	32	2.188	2435	2135	1.141
3	Sisley Treviso	28	21	7	59	70	38	1.842	2569	2357	1.090
4	Trenkwalder Modena	28	21	7	59	68	38	1.789	2475	2334	1.060
5	Lube Banca Marche Macerata	28	20	8	57	67	40	1.675	2461	2332	1.055
6	Acqua Paradiso Monza	28	18	10	55	66	43	1.535	2507	2418	1.037
7	CoprAtlantide Piacenza	28	17	11	53	62	41	1.512	2408	2261	1.065
8	Marmi Lanza Verona	28	15	13	44	55	50	1.100	2376	2337	1.017
9	RPA-LuigiBacchi.it Perugia	28	13	15	39	53	58	0.914	2487	2499	0.995
10	Tonno Callipo Vibo Valentia	28	10	18	31	43	63	0.683	2352	2437	0.965
11	Prisma Taranto	28	10	18	30	40	63	0.635	2270	2424	0.936
12	Andreoli Latina	28	7	21	24	41	69	0.594	2393	2537	0.943
13	Yoga Forlì	28	6	22	21	31	70	0.443	2138	2385	0.896
14	Esse-Ti Carilo Loreto	28	5	23	18	31	75	0.413	2235	2492	0.897
15	Aran Cucine Abruzzo Pineto	28	2	26	6	15	80	0.188	1864	2290	0.814

=== Playoffs ===
Quarterfinals
1	Trentino	3	3	3
8	Verona	0	2	0
4	Modena	1	2	3	0
5	Macerata	3	3	2	3
2	Cuneo	3	3	3
7	Piacenza	0	1	0
3	Treviso	3	0	3	3
6	Monza	2	3	1	0

Semifinals
1	Trentino	3	3	0	3
5	Macerata	0	2	3	2
2	Cuneo	3	0	3	3
3	Treviso	1	3	1	1

Final
1	Trentino	1
2	Cuneo	3

==== Quarterfinals ====
===== Itas Diatec Trentino (1) 3:0 Marmi Lanza Verona (8) =====
Date	Time		Score		Set 1	Set 2	Set 3	Set 4	Set 5	Total	Report
24 Mar	20:30	Itas Diatec Trentino	3–0	Marmi Lanza Verona	25–22	25–17	32–30			82–69	
28 Mar	18:00	Marmi Lanza Verona	2–3	Itas Diatec Trentino	18–25	25–23	25–21	14–25	12–15	94–109	
31 Mar	20:30	Itas Diatec Trentino	3–0	Marmi Lanza Verona	25–21	25–17	25–21			75–59	

===== Lube Banca Marche Macerata (5) 3:1 Trenkwalder Modena (4) =====
Date	Time		Score		Set 1	Set 2	Set 3	Set 4	Set 5	Total	Report
27 Mar	16:00	Trenkwalder Modena	1–3	Lube Banca Marche Macerata	23–25	25–20	19–25	23–25		90–95	
31 Mar	20:30	Lube Banca Marche Macerata	3–2	Trenkwalder Modena	21–25	25–21	25–18	21–25	15–11	107–100	
4 Apr	18:00	Trenkwalder Modena	3–2	Lube Banca Marche Macerata	21–25	25–22	14–25	25–23	15–11	100–106	
10 Apr	16:00	Lube Banca Marche Macerata	3–0	Trenkwalder Modena	25–22	25–13	25–21			75–56	

===== Bre Banca Lannutti Cuneo (2) 3:0 CoprAtlantide Piacenza (7) =====
Date	Time		Score		Set 1	Set 2	Set 3	Set 4	Set 5	Total	Report
1 Apr	20:30	Bre Banca Lannutti Cuneo	3–0	CoprAtlantide Piacenza	25–16	25–21	25–19			75–56	
5 Apr	18:00	CoprAtlantide Piacenza	1–3	Bre Banca Lannutti Cuneo	24–26	30–28	24–26	23–25		101–105	
8 Apr	20:30	Bre Banca Lannutti Cuneo	3–0	CoprAtlantide Piacenza	25–18	25–22	25–19			75–59	

===== Sisley Treviso (3) 3:1 Acqua Paradiso Monza (6) =====
Date	Time		Score		Set 1	Set 2	Set 3	Set 4	Set 5	Total	Report
28 Mar	19:00	Sisley Treviso	3–2	Acqua Paradiso Monza	25–20	25–21	22–25	22–25	15–11	109–102	
1 Apr	20:30	Acqua Paradiso Monza	3–0	Sisley Treviso	25–18	25–18	25–17			75–53	
5 Apr	18:00	Sisley Treviso	3–1	Acqua Paradiso Monza	25–20	25–22	22–25	25–12		97–79	
11 Apr	18:00	Acqua Paradiso Monza	0–3	Sisley Treviso	20–25	21–25	21–25			62–75	

==== Semifinals ====
===== Itas Diatec Trentino (1) 3:1 Lube Banca Marche Macerata (5) =====
Date	Time		Score		Set 1	Set 2	Set 3	Set 4	Set 5	Total	Report
18 Apr	18:00	Itas Diatec Trentino	3–0	Lube Banca Marche Macerata	25–18	25–19	25–22			75–59	
21 Apr	20:30	Lube Banca Marche Macerata	2–3	Itas Diatec Trentino	17–25	25–17	25–19	19–25	10–15	96–101	
25 Apr	18:00	Itas Diatec Trentino	0–3	Lube Banca Marche Macerata	21–25	23–25	23–25			67–75	
28 Apr	20:30	Lube Banca Marche Macerata	2–3	Itas Diatec Trentino	26–28	29–27	25–17	23–25	11–15	114–112	

===== Bre Banca Lannutti Cuneo (2) 3:1 Sisley Treviso (3) =====
Date	Time		Score		Set 1	Set 2	Set 3	Set 4	Set 5	Total	Report
18 Apr	18:00	Bre Banca Lannutti Cuneo	3–1	Sisley Treviso	23–25	25–18	25–23	25–20		98–86	
21 Apr	20:30	Sisley Treviso	3–0	Bre Banca Lannutti Cuneo	25–20	29–27	25–15			79–62	
25 Apr	18:00	Bre Banca Lannutti Cuneo	3–1	Sisley Treviso	25–10	25–20	22–25	28–26		100–81	
29 Apr	20:30	Sisley Treviso	1–3	Bre Banca Lannutti Cuneo	27–29	23–25	25–22	19–25		94–101	

==== Final ====
===== Bre Banca Lannutti Cuneo (2) 1:0 Itas Diatec Trentino (1) =====
- Venue: Futurshow Station, Casalecchio di Reno, Emilia-Romagna

Date	Time		Score		Set 1	Set 2	Set 3	Set 4	Set 5	Total	Report
9 May	18:00	Itas Diatec Trentino	1–3	Bre Banca Lannutti Cuneo	25–14	20–25	22–25	20–25		87–89	
