= Simone Parodi =

Italian volleyball player (born 1986)

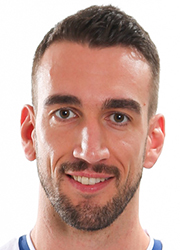

Personal information
- Nationality: (Italy) Italian
- Born: 16 June 1986 (age 40); Sanremo, Italy
- Height: 1.96 m (6 ft 5 in)
- Weight: 95 kg (209 lb)
- Spike: 350 cm (138 in)

Volleyball information
- Position: Outside hitter
- Current club: (Italy) Prisma Volley
- Number: 3

Career
Years	Teams
2005–2006; 2006–2007; 2007–2008; 2008–2009; 2009–2011; 2011–2016; 2016–2018; 2018–2019; 2019–2020; 2020; 2020–2021; 2021	(Italy) Piemonte Volley (Italy) Volley Corigliano (Italy) Piemonte Volley (Italy) BluVolley Verona (Italy) Piemonte Volley (Italy) Volley Lube (Italy) Volley Piacenza (Italy) Top Volley Latina (Poland) ZAKSA Kędzierzyn-Koźle (Italy) Prisma Volley (Poland) Asseco Resovia (Italy) Prisma Volley

National team
2008–	Italy
Honours
Men's volleyball
Representing Italy
Olympic Games
Bronze medal – third place	2012 London
FIVB World League
Bronze medal – third place	2013 Mar del Plata
Bronze medal – third place	2014 Florence
CEV European Championship
Silver medal – second place	2011 Austria/Czech Republic
Silver medal – second place	2013 Denmark/Poland

Simone Parodi (born 16 June 1986) is an Italian volleyball player, former member of the Italy men's national volleyball team, bronze medalist of the Olympic Games London 2012, World League (2013, 2014) and silver medalist of the 2013 European Championship. On club level, he plays for Italian team Prisma Volley.

== Sporting achievements ==
=== Clubs ===
- CEV Cup
  - 2009/2010 – Bre Banca Lannutti Cuneo
- National championships
  - 2005/2006 Italian Cup, with Bre Banca Lannutti Cuneo
  - 2009/2010 Italian Championship, with Bre Banca Lannutti Cuneo
  - 2010/2011 Italian SuperCup, with Bre Banca Lannutti Cuneo
  - 2010/2011 Italian Cup, with Bre Banca Lannutti Cuneo
  - 2011/2012 Italian Championship, with Lube Banca Marche Macerata
  - 2012/2013 Italian SuperCup, with Cucine Lube Banca Marche Macerata
  - 2013/2014 Italian Championship, with Cucine Lube Banca Marche Macerata
  - 2014/2015 Italian SuperCup, with Cucine Lube Banca Marche Treia
  - 2019/2020 Polish SuperCup, with Grupa Azoty ZAKSA Kędzierzyn-Koźle
