= Esna (disambiguation) =

Esna is a city in Egypt.

ESNA (Escadrille des Sous-Marins Nucléaires d'Attaque) is a French nuclear submarine squadron.

Esna or ESNA may refer to:

== Places ==
- Esna, Järva Parish, a village in Järva Parish, Järva County, Estonia
- Esna, Paide, a village in Paide town, Järva County, Estonia

== People ==
- Esne (bishop) (died c. 787), an English Catholic bishop
- Esna (singer) (born 1987), an American singer-songwriter based in South Korea
- Esna Boyd (1899–1966), an Australian tennis player
- Asko Esna (born 1986), an Estonian volleyball player
- Sten Esna (born 1982), an Estonian volleyball player

== Other ==
- Esna Technologies Inc. or Esnatech, a Canadian software company
- Evangelical Synod of North America, a Protestant Christian denomination in the United States
