= Dejonckheere =

Dejonckheere is a surname. Notable people with the surname include:

- Godfried Dejonckheere (born 1952), Belgian race walker
- Noël Dejonckheere (1955–2022), Belgian cyclist
- Stijn Dejonckheere (born 1988), Belgian volleyball player
