= Nikola Grbić =

Serbian volleyball player and coach

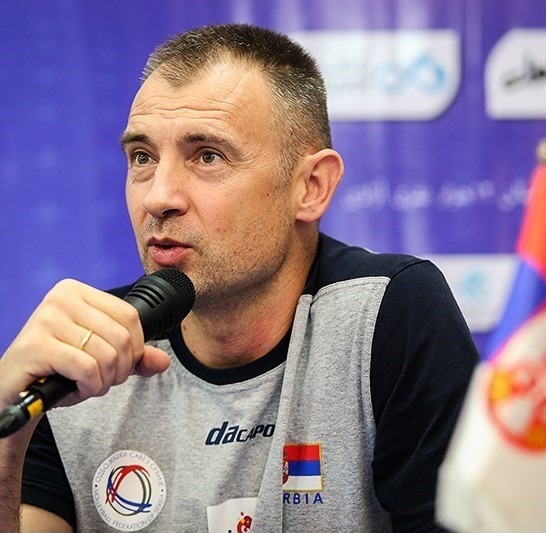
- Grbić in 2016

Personal information
- Born: 6 September 1973 (age 53); Klek, SR Serbia, SFR Yugoslavia
- Height: 1.95 m (6 ft 5 in)
- Education: BK University – Management in Sports

Coaching information
- Current team: Poland
Previous teams coached
| Years | Teams |
|---|---|
| 2014–2015; 2015–2019; 2016–2019; 2019–2021; 2021–2022; 2022– | Sir Safety Perugia; Serbia; Calzedonia Verona; ZAKSA Kędzierzyn-Koźle; Sir Safety Perugia; Poland |

Volleyball information
- Position: Setter
- Number: 9 (national team)

Career
| Years | Teams |
|---|---|
| 1987–1990; 1990–1994; 1994–1995; 1995–1996; 1996–1997; 1997–1999; 1999–2000; 2000–2003; 2003–2007; 2007–2009; 2009–2013; 2013–2014 | Gik Banat; OK Vojvodina; Gabeca Montichiari; TNT Traco Catania; Gabeca Montichiari; Piemonte Volley; Sisley Treviso; Asystel Milano; Volley Piacenza; Itas Diatec Trentino; Piemonte Volley; Zenit Kazan |

National team
| 1991–1992; 1995–2006; 2006–2010 | (Socialist Federal Republic of Yugoslavia) Yugoslavia (Federal Republic of Yugoslavia) Serbia and Montenegro; Serbia |
Honours
Men's volleyball
Representing Serbia and Montenegro
Olympic Games
| Gold medal – first place | 2000 Sydney |
| Bronze medal – third place | 1996 Atlanta |
FIVB World Championship
| Silver medal – second place | 1998 Japan |
FIVB World Cup
| Bronze medal – third place | 2003 Japan |
FIVB World Grand Champions Cup
| Bronze medal – third place | 2001 Japan |
FIVB World League
| Silver medal – second place | 2003 Madrid |
| Silver medal – second place | 2005 Belgrade |
| Bronze medal – third place | 2002 Belo Horizonte |
| Bronze medal – third place | 2004 Rome |
CEV European Championship
| Gold medal – first place | 2001 Czech Republic |
| Silver medal – second place | 1997 Netherlands |
| Bronze medal – third place | 1995 Greece |
| Bronze medal – third place | 1999 Austria |
| Bronze medal – third place | 2005 Italy/Serbia and Montenegro |
Representing Serbia
FIVB World Championship
| Bronze medal – third place | 2010 Italy |
FIVB World League
| Silver medal – second place | 2008 Rio de Janeiro |
| Silver medal – second place | 2009 Belgrade |
CEV European Championship
| Bronze medal – third place | 2007 Russia |
Head coach Serbia
FIVB World League
| Gold medal – first place | 2016 Kraków |
| Silver medal – second place | 2015 Rio de Janeiro |
CEV European Championship
| Bronze medal – third place | 2017 Poland |
Head coach Poland
Olympic Games
| Silver medal – second place | 2024 Paris |
FIVB World Championship
| Silver medal – second place | 2022 Poland/Slovenia |
| Bronze medal – third place | 2025 Philippines |
FIVB Nations League
| Gold medal – first place | 2023 Gdańsk |
| Gold medal – first place | 2025 Ningbo |
| Gold medal – first place | 2026 Ningbo |
| Bronze medal – third place | 2022 Bologna |
| Bronze medal – third place | 2024 Łódź |
CEV European Championship
| Gold medal – first place | 2023 Italy/Bulgaria/North Macedonia/Israel |
| Gold medal – first place | 2026 Italy/Bulgaria/Finland/Romania |

Nikola Grbić (Serbian Cyrillic: Никола Грбић; born 6 September 1973) is a Serbian professional volleyball coach and former player who is currently serving as head coach for the Poland national team. Grbić is a gold medalist of the 2000 Summer Olympics, a bronze medalist of the 1996 Summer Olympics, and a multiple World Championship, European Championship, and World League medalist. Widely regarded as one of the greatest volleyball players of all time, Grbić was inducted into the Volleyball Hall of Fame in 2016.

== Career as player ==
=== Club volleyball ===
In 1994, Grbić began playing for Gabeca Montichiari, which started a 20–year career playing for eight different Italian teams and resulted in eight league titles from 1994 to 2013. He won two Championship titles in Jugoslavia (1991 and 1992 Vojvodina) and a national Cup (1992 Vojvodina), two Championship titles in Italy (2008 Trentino – 2010 Cuneo), and one in Russia (2014 Zenit Kazan). He also won two CEV Euro Champions League titles (2000 Sisley – 2009 Trentino). His four-year contract with Sisley Treviso was terminated after the 1999–2000 season; that summer he won the Olympic gold medal with Yugoslavia in Sydney.

=== National team ===
Grbić started with the senior national team in 1991, when he was 18 years old. For the next couple of years (1992–1994), he was unable to play due to an international embargo.

Yugoslavia, with Grbić, won the bronze medal at the 1996 Summer Olympics in Atlanta. Grbić was honored as the European Championship Best Setter in 1997 as Yugoslavia earned the silver medal. In 1998, he led Yugoslavia to the silver medal at the FIVB World Championship in Japan.

Grbić was the captain of his national team from 1999 to 2010. He led Yugoslavia to the gold medal at the 2000 Summer Olympics in Sydney, with a dominating three-set win over Russia in the finals. Grbić then helped Serbia win the bronze medal at the 2010 FIVB World Championship in Italy, where he was named Best Setter of the tournament.

== Career as coach ==
In May 2014, Grbić became the head coach of the Italian club Sir Safety Perugia. On 3 February 2015, Grbić was announced as the new head coach of the Serbia men's national volleyball team. Grbić led Serbia to the silver medal at the 2015 FIVB World League. In the next year, he led Serbia to the gold medal at the 2016 FIVB World League. Serbia had lost their five previous appearances in the World League final, including three times to Brazil and the previous year against France. Finally, after five silver medals and three bronze medals, they won the gold. In 2022, he became the head coach of the Poland men's national volleyball team, with whom he won a silver medal at the Paris Olympics and two European Championship titles. By the 2026 Nations League, Poland under Grbić had won a medal at each of the nine major tournaments it entered: bronze at the 2022 Nations League, silver at the 2022 World Championship, gold at the 2023 Nations League and the 2023 European Championship, bronze at the 2024 Nations League, silver at the 2024 Olympic Games, gold at the 2025 Nations League, bronze at the 2025 World Championship and gold at the 2026 Nations League. At the 2026 European Championship Poland beat France 3–1 in the final and retained the title.

== Personal life ==
Grbić was born in Klek. His father played volleyball, and Grbić began as an outside hitter; before one match his father told him that from then on he would play as a setter. He has an older brother, Vladimir, who is also a former volleyball player. Grbić's wife is named Stanislava and together they have two sons, Matija and Miloš.

== Honours ==
=== As a player ===
- CEV Champions League
  - 2008–09 – with Trentino Volley
- CEV European Champions Cup
  - 1999–2000 – with Sisley Treviso
- CEV Cup
  - 1997–98 – with Alpitour Traco Cuneo
  - 2005–06 – with Copra Berni Piacenza
  - 2009–10 – with Bre Banca Lannutti Cuneo
- Domestic
  - 1991–92 Serbia and Montenegro Championship, with Vojvodina Novi Sad
  - 1992–93 Serbia and Montenegro Championship, with Vojvodina Novi Sad
  - 1992–93 Serbia and Montenegro Cup, with Vojvodina Novi Sad
  - 1998–99 Italian Cup, with TNT Alpitour Cuneo
  - 1999–2000 Italian Cup, with Sisley Treviso
  - 2007–08 Italian Championship, with Itas Diatec Trentino
  - 2009–10 Italian Championship, with Bre Banca Lannutti Cuneo
  - 2010–11 Italian SuperCup, with Bre Banca Lannutti Cuneo
  - 2010–11 Italian Cup, with Bre Banca Lannutti Cuneo
  - 2013–14 Russian Championship, with Zenit Kazan

=== As a coach ===
- CEV Champions League
  - 2020–21 – with ZAKSA Kędzierzyn-Koźle
- Domestic
  - 2019–20 Polish SuperCup, with ZAKSA Kędzierzyn-Koźle
  - 2020–21 Polish SuperCup, with ZAKSA Kędzierzyn-Koźle
  - 2020–21 Polish Cup, with ZAKSA Kędzierzyn-Koźle
  - 2021–22 Italian Cup, with Sir Safety Conad Perugia

=== Individual awards ===
- 1997: CEV European Championship – Best setter
- 1997: Sportsman of the year by the Olympic Committee of Serbia
- 2000: Italian Championship – Best player
- 2000: Italian Championship – Best foreign player
- 2001: CEV European Championship – Best setter
- 2003: CEV European Championship – Best setter
- 2003: FIVB World Cup – Best setter
- 2005: CEV European Championship – Best setter
- 2006: CEV Top Teams Cup – Best setter
- 2009: FIVB World League – Best setter
- 2010: Italian Championship – Best setter
- 2010: Italian Cup – Best player
- 2010: CEV Cup – Best setter
- 2010: FIVB World Championship – Best setter
- 2014: CEV – Ultimate team leader
- 2023: Awards of Plebiscite of Przegląd Sportowy – Coach of the year
- 2026: CEV European Championship – Best coach

=== State awards ===
- 2024: Knight's Cross of the Order of Merit of the Republic of Poland

== See also ==
- Matches of Serbian men's volleyball national team conducted by Nikola Grbić
- International Volleyball Hall of Fame

Awards
| Preceded by (Netherlands) Peter Blangé | Best Setter of CEV European Championship; 2001; 2003; 2005 | Succeeded by (Russia) Vadim Khamuttskikh |
| Preceded by (United States) Lloy Ball | Best Setter of FIVB World Cup; 2003 | Succeeded by (Spain) Miguel Ángel Falasca |
| Preceded by (United States) Lloy Ball | Best Setter of FIVB World League; 2009 | Succeeded by (Russia) Sergey Grankin |
| Preceded by (Poland) Paweł Zagumny | Best Setter of FIVB World Championship; 2010 | Succeeded by (Germany) Lukas Kampa |
Sporting positions
| Preceded by (Belgium) Vital Heynen | Head coach of Poland; 2022– | Succeeded by – |
