= Volleyball at the 2017 Island Games =

- Dates: June 24 – 30
- Host city: Gotland, Sweden
- Venue: Rävhagen, Visby
- Level: Senior
- Events: 2
- Participation: 9 (men), 10 (women) nations

Volleyball, for the 2017 Island Games, held at the Rävhagen, Visby, Gotland, Sweden in June 2017.

Teams are ranked, based on previous three Island Games results and will pay in a pool competition before playing a knockout.

== Medal table ==
Rank	Nation	Gold	Silver	Bronze	Total
1	Saare County (Saaremaa)	1	1	0	2
2	Åland (Åland)	1	0	0	1
3	Hitra Municipality (Hitra)	0	1	0	1
4	Faroe Islands (FRO)	0	0	1	1
4	Menorca (Menorca)	0	0	1	1
Totals (5 entries)		2	2	2	6

== Results ==
Event	Gold	Silver	Bronze
Men	Åland; Mikael Donning; Henrik Engblom; Christopher Eriksson; Aldis Jaunzeikars; Johan Lindström; Edvard Nordlund; Jacob Nordlund; Tobias Nordlund; Andreas Pellas; Verneri Vetriö; Jonas Witting; Aigars Zakis	Saare County; Egert Ader; Karel Ellermaa; Asko Esna; Helr Jalg; Chris-Karlis Lepp; Kristjan Lepp; Siim Olavi Rantanen; Sander Tiits; Mart Tiitsaar; Tom Tom; Johan Wahter; Villu Vahter	Faroe Islands; Thorvald Danielsen; Bjarki Enni; Trygvi Hansen; Rói Hentze; Bardur Jacbsen; Bjarni Larsen; Niel Niclasen; Ingálvur Eyðunsson Olsen; Steffan Rosenlund Olsen; Suni Juul Pedersen; Johan Arni Elisson Wang; Oskar í Haraldstovu Weihe
Women	Saare County; Kadri Aru; Janne Järvalt; Krista Kotselainen; Cristin Lepp; Andra Mesila; Liisel Nelis; Kaisa Õunpuu; Eliisa Peit; Nette Peit; Kätriin Põld; Kristi Põld; Piret Prangel	Hitra Municipality; Anna Østmark Andersen; Sanna Fjeldvær; Sara Fjeldvær; Synnøve Gjertsås; Marita Hestnes; Thea Hestnes; Tone-Alice Krlsen; Elinor Lovise Oldervik; Julie Caroline Sæther	Menorca; Francesca Bujosa Quetglas; Nerea Burgos Manceras; Marina Faner Bagur; Yaiza Izquierdo Martin; Maria Assumpta Jofre Guasch; Lourdes Llorens Marques; Roser Olives Casasnovas; Beatriz Pons Benavides; Júlia Pons Capó; Aïda Riudavets Carreras; Riudavets Carreras; Valentina Stenta
