= Georgios Tzioumakas =

Greek volleyball player (born 1995)

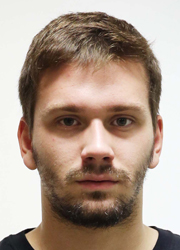

Personal information
- Full name: Georgios Tzioumakas
- Nationality: Greek
- Born: 23 January 1995 (age 31); Thessaloniki, Greece
- Height: 2.05 m (6 ft 9 in)
- Weight: 102 kg (225 lb)
- Spike: 360 cm (142 in)
- Block: 355 cm (140 in)

Volleyball information
- Position: Opposite
- Current club: Iraklis Thessaloniki
- Number: 14

Career
Years	Teams
2010–2013; 2013–2014; 2015–2016; 2016–2017; 2017–2018; 2018–2019; 2019–2020; 2020; 2020–2021; 2021–2022; 2022–2023; 2023; 2023–2024; 2024; 2024–	(Greece) Iraklis Thessaloniki (Italy) Cuneo Volley (Italy) Sir Safety Perugia (Italy) Volley Piacenza (Italy) New Mater Volley (Greece) A.E.K. (Greece) Iraklis Thessaloniki (Iran) Shahdab Yazd (Greece) Filippos Veria (Greece) Foinikas Syros (Saudi Arabia) Al-Taraji (Greece) O.F.I. (Greece) Pegasus Polichni (Cyprus) Pafiakos (Greece) Iraklis Thessaloniki

National team
2012–	Greece
- Last updated: 16 September 2024

Georgios Tzioumakas (born 23 January 1995) is a Greek volleyball player. He is part of the Greece men's national volleyball team. On club level he plays for Iraklis Thessaloniki.
