= Dante Boninfante =

Italian volleyball player (born 1977)

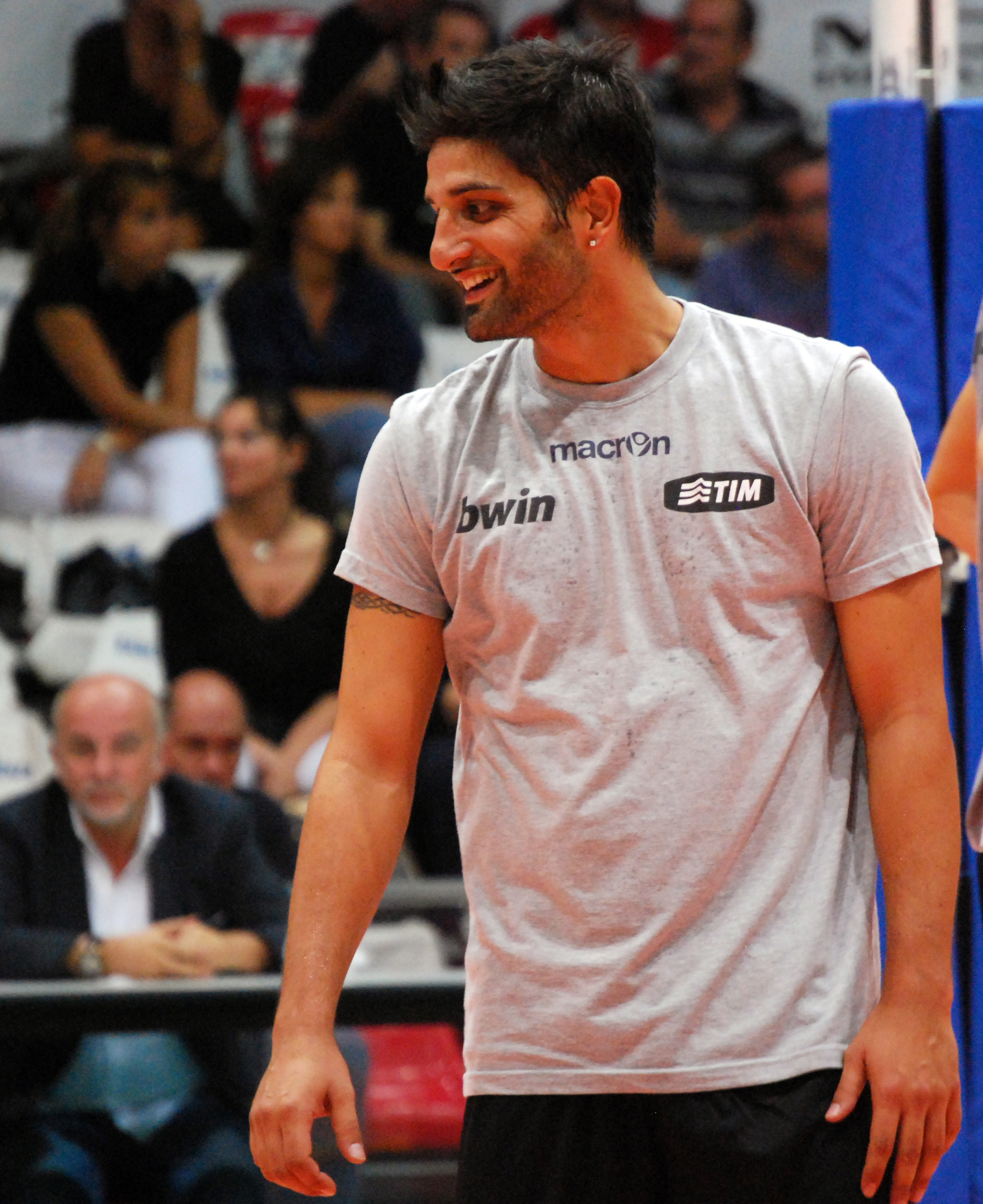

Personal information
- Nationality: Italian
- Born: 7 March 1977 (age 49); Battipaglia, Italy
- Height: 1.88 m (6 ft 2 in)
- Spike: 334 cm (131 in)
- Block: 315 cm (124 in)

Coaching information
Previous teams coached
Years	Teams
2017–2020; 2021– 2022–2024	Trentino Volley (assistant); Volley Prata; Greece

Volleyball information
- Position: Setter
- Number: 10

Career
Years	Teams
1996–1997; 1997–1998; 1998–1999; 1999–2001; 2001–2004; 2004–2006; 2006–2007; 2007–2010; 2010–2011; 2011–2012; 2012–2013; 2013–2014; 2014–2015; 2015; 2015–2017	Sisley Treviso; Com Cavi Napoli; Caffe Motta Salerno; Sisley Treviso; Italia Volley Ferrara; Pallavolo Gabeca; Marmi Lanza Verona; Copra Elior Piacenza; Sisley Treviso; M. Roma Volley; PGE Skra Bełchatów; Marmi Lanza Verona; Parmareggio Modena; Ninfa Latina; Revivre Milano

National team
2001–2012	Italy
Honours
Men's volleyball
Representing Italy
Olympic Games
Bronze medal – third place	2012 London
European Championships
Silver medal – second place	2011 Austria/Czech Republic
- Last updated: 21 December 2017

Dante Boninfante (born 7 March 1977) is an Italian retired volleyball player and current coach, former member of Italy men's national volleyball team, a bronze medalist of the Olympic Games London 2012, silver medalist of the European Championship 2011 and a double Italian Champion.

== Career ==
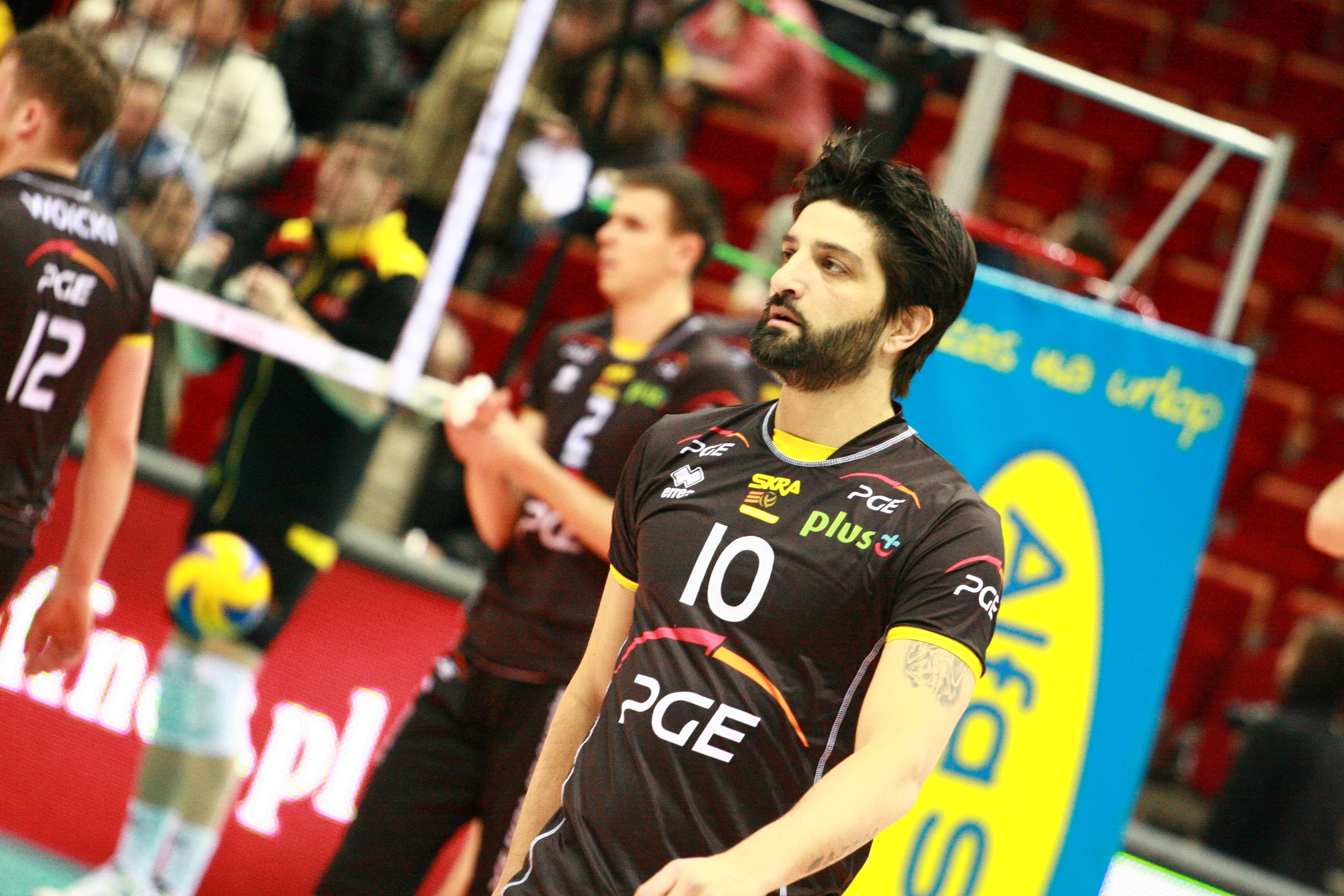
Dante during match of PlusLiga - Lotos Trefl Gdańsk vs PGE Skra Bełchatów

=== Clubs ===
In 2013 signed a contract with Marmi Lanza Verona.

== Sporting achievements ==
=== Clubs ===
==== CEV Cup ====
- 2010/2011 - with Sisley Treviso

==== National championships ====
- 1999/2000 Italian Cup, with Sisley Treviso
- 1999/2000 Italian SuperCup, with Sisley Treviso
- 2000/2001 Italian Championship, with Sisley Treviso
- 2008/2009 Italian SuperCup, with Copra Elior Piacenza
- 2008/2009 Italian Championship, with Copra Elior Piacenza

=== National team ===
==== Olympic Games ====
- 2012 London
