= Emanuele Zanini =

Italian volleyball coach

Personal information
- Nickname: Manu
- Born: 15 April 1965 (age 61); San Giovanni del Dosso, Italy

Coaching information
Previous teams coached
Years	Teams
1995–1999; 1999–2000; 2000–2003; 2003–2004; 2004–2005; 2005–2006; 2006–2007; 2007–2008; 2008–2011; 2008; 2010–2011; 2011–2012; 2012–2013; 2013–2014; 2013–2016; 2017–2018; 2018–2019; 2019–2021; 2020; 2021; 2021–2022; 2022–2026	Gabeca Pallavolo (AC); Italy (AC); Gabeca Pallavolo; Estense 4 Torri Ferrara; Hypo Tirol Innsbruck; Codyeco S.Croce; Umbria Volley; Marmi Lanza Verona; Slovakia; Trenkwalder Modena; Umbria Volley; Gabeca Pallavolo; Volley Team Bratislava; Beauvais Oise UC; Turkey; Warta Zawiercie; Emma Villas Siena; Croatia; Asseco Resovia; Mladost Zagreb; Consar RCM Ravenna; Belgium
Honours
Men's volleyball
Head coach Slovakia
European League
Gold medal – first place	2008 Turkey
Gold medal – first place	2011 Slovakia
Head coach Belgium
FIVB Challenger Cup
Silver medal – second place	2024 Linyi

Emanuele Zanini (born 15 April 1965) is an Italian professional volleyball coach.

== Career as coach ==
He studied physical education at University of Bologna graduating in 1988.

He became a head coach in 2000. Zanini coached in his career several teams in Italy and also in Austria, Slovakia, France and Poland. In 1999–2000, he served as an assistant and a coach of physical preparation of the Italy men's national volleyball team. Since 2008, he has coached Slovakian men's national team for four seasons leading to their best results in the history.

In August 2013, he was appointed a head coach of the Turkey men's national team for three years. He replaced Bosnian-born Frenchman Veljko Basic, who served at this post since 2010. Zanini became a head coach of the French team Beauvais Oise UC Volley in the same time.

== Honours ==
=== Club ===
- Domestic
  - 2004–05 Austrian Cup, with Hypo Tirol Innsbruck
  - 2004–05 Austrian Championship, with Hypo Tirol Innsbruck

=== Youth national team ===
- 2015 FIVB U23 World Championship, with Turkey

Sporting positions
Preceded by (Spain) Fernando Muñoz	Head coach of Belgium; 2022–2026	Succeeded by TBD
