= Ivan Zaytsev (volleyball) =

Italian volleyball player

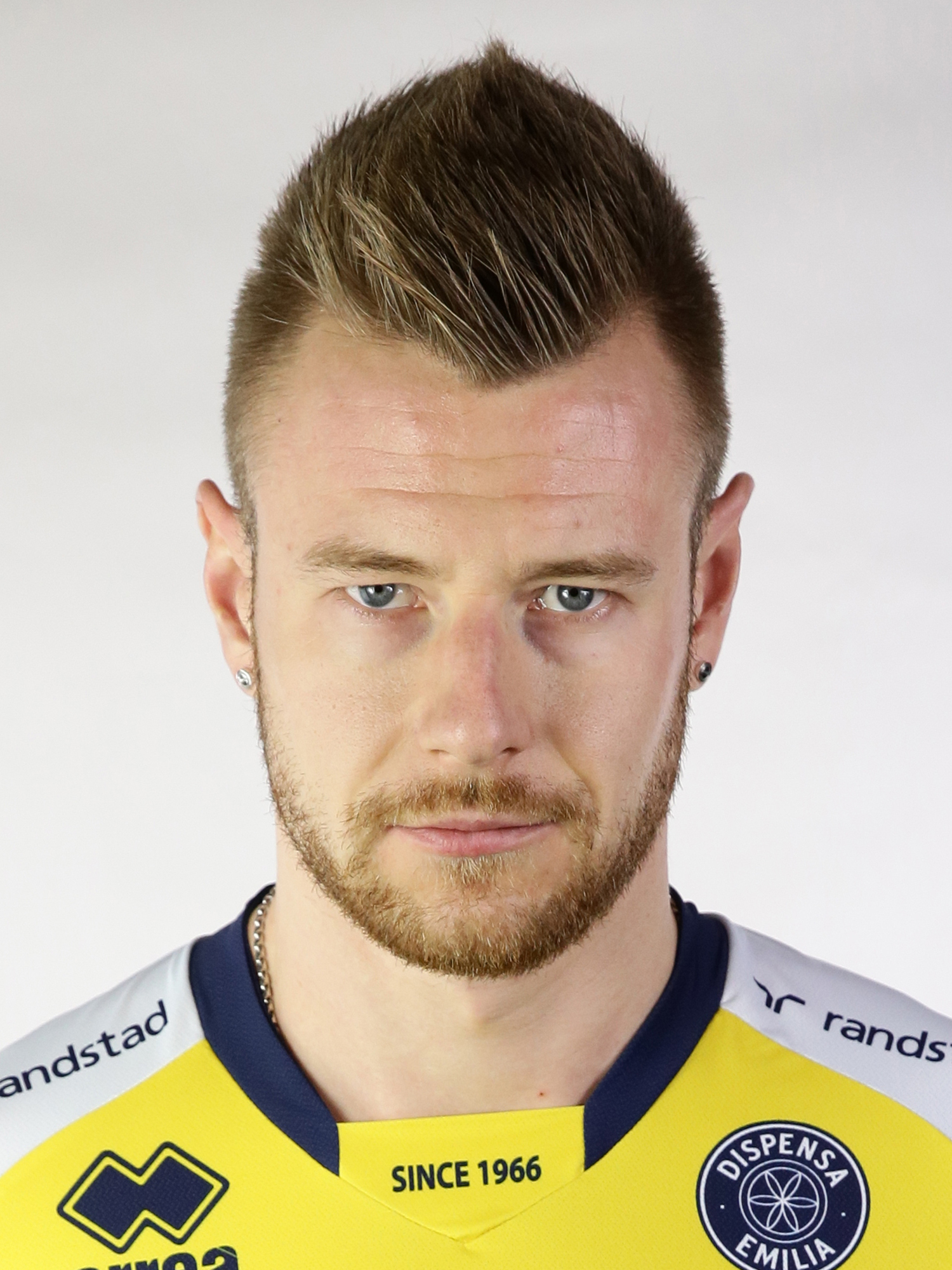
- Zaytsev in 2019

Personal information
- Full name: Ivan Vyacheslavovich Zaytsev
- Nickname: lo Zar ('the Tsar')
- Born: 2 October 1988 (age 38); Spoleto, Italy
- Height: 2.04 m (6 ft 8 in)
- Weight: 103 kg (227 lb)
- Spike: 370 cm (146 in)
- Block: 355 cm (140 in)

Volleyball information
- Position: Opposite
- Current team: Cuneo Volley

Career
Years	Teams
2004–2006	(Italy) Umbria Perugia
2006–2007	(Italy) M. Roma Volley
2007–2008	(Italy) Andreoli Latina
2008–2012	(Italy) M. Roma Volley
2012–2014	(Italy) Lube Banca Macerata
2014–2016	(Russia) Dinamo Moscow
2016	(Qatar) Al Arabi
2016–2018	(Italy) Sir Safety Perugia
2018–2020	(Italy) Modena Volley
2020–2021	(Russia) Kuzbass Kemerovo
2021–2024	(Italy) Volley Lube
2024	(Italy) Vero Volley Monza
2024–2025	(Turkey) Galatasaray
2025–	(Italy) Cuneo Volley

National team
2008–2022	Italy
Medal record
Men's volleyball
Representing Italy
Olympic Games
Silver medal – second place	2016 Rio de Janeiro	Team
Bronze medal – third place	2012 London	Team
World Cup
Silver medal – second place	2015 Japan	Team
European Championship
Silver medal – second place	2011 Austria/Czech Republic	Team
Silver medal – second place	2013 Denmark/Poland	Team
Bronze medal – third place	2015 Bulgaria/Italy	Team
World League
Bronze medal – third place	2013 Mar del Plata	Team
Bronze medal – third place	2014 Florence	Team
Mediterranean Games
Gold medal – first place	2009 Pescara	Team
- Last updated: 2 January 2018

Ivan Vyacheslavovich Zaytsev (Italian: [ˈiːvan ˈdzaittsev, -ef]; Russian: Иван Вячеславович Зайцев, IPA: [ɪˈvan vʲɪtɕɪˈslavəvʲɪdʑ ˈzajtsɨf]; born 2 October 1988), nicknamed lo Zar ('the Tsar'), is an Italian professional volleyball player of Russian origin, former captain of Italy men's national volleyball team, a bronze medalist of the Olympic Games London 2012, silver medalist of the European Championship (2011, 2013), bronze medalist of the World League (2013, 2014), Italian Champion (2014) and silver medalist of the Olympic Games Rio 2016.

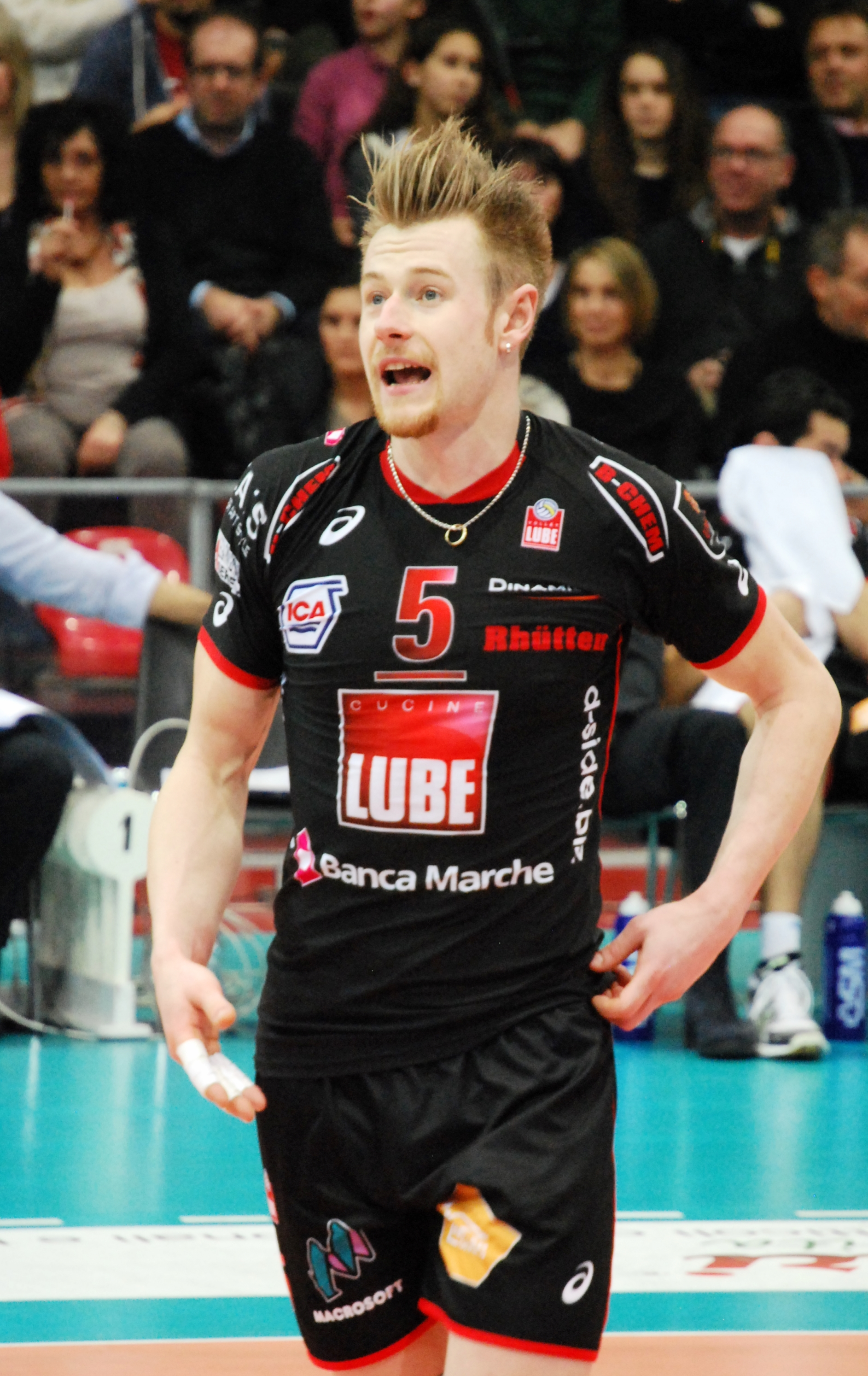
During the match as a Lube Banca Macerata player on 8 January 2014

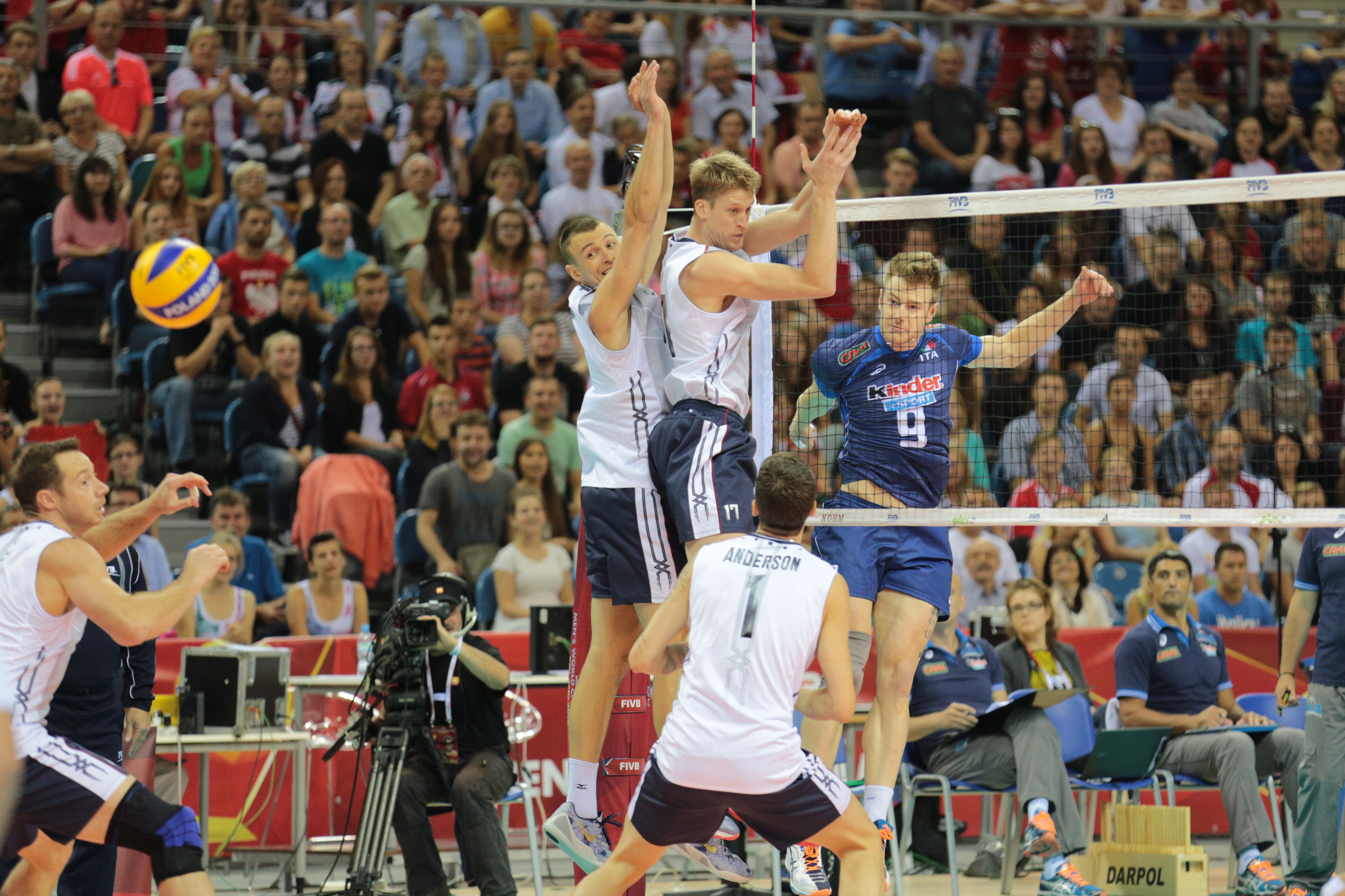
Ivan Zaytsev (#9) during World Championship, scoring against USA in Kraków, Poland

== Career ==
=== Clubs ===
He started his career as a setter in 2004, but later moved to the outside hitter role. He started playing in Serie A1 at 16 years old. His first club was RPA-LuigiBacchi.it Perugia, where he played for two seasons. After this, he moved to M. Roma Volley. In the 2007/08 season, he played for Andreoli Latina. Then he came back to M. Roma Volley and played there until 2012, when he signed with Lube Banca Macerata. With this team, he won the Italian SuperCup in 2012 and the Italian Championship 2013/14. On 9 May 2014 his departure from Lube was announced. Then for two seasons, he was a player of Russian club VC Dynamo Moscow. He moved to of Al-Arabi SC in Qatar and won the Cup of Emir. Zaytsev came back to Serie A1 and joined Sir Safety Conad Perugia, the overall dominating Team of the 2017/18 season in Italy. Despite failing to reach Champions League final, after losing to Zenit Kazan again, the team managed to take the bronze medal. Zaytsev moves the following season to Modena Volley as Perugia announced that Wilfredo Leon would join the team, taking his spot. Zaytsev has also expressed the desire to play in his favorite role as opposite spiker again.

On December 27, 2024, he signed a contract with Galatasaray until the end of the 2024–25 season. Galatasaray club said goodbye to the player on May 12, 2025, by publishing a thank you message.

=== National team ===
He debuted with the Italy men's national volleyball team in 2008. In the 2013 European Championship Zaytsev was named as the "Best Server". Zaytsev was the main scorer and team leader during World League 2014 and Italy achieved bronze medal. In the World League, he and his teammates won two consecutive bronze in the 2013 and 2014 editions, the latter played in Italy in Florence. He was appointed to the 2014 World Championship held in Poland. He was the leader of his team in the first round, but in the match against the United States injured his ankle, so despite the promotion of his team to second round, he did not play. In 2015 Zaytsev and Italian team achieved silver medal of the 2015 European Championship and Zaytsev was named Best opposite spiker. In 2016 he achieved a silver medal at the 2016 Olympics.

== Personal life ==
Zaytsev is the son of Olympic Champion volleyball player Vyacheslav Zaytsev. He was born in Spoleto, where his father was playing at the time. His mother, Irina Pozdnyakova, is a former competitive swimmer.

On 12 May 2008, after ten years of uninterrupted residence in Italy, Ivan Zaytsev obtained Italian citizenship. His sister Anna (born 1975) also holds Italian citizenship, after she married an Italian in 1993.

On 18 May 2013 Zaytsev married Ashling Sirocchi. In April 2014, the couple announced that they were expecting their first child. On 31 October 2014 his wife Ashling gave birth to their son named Alexander "Sasha". In July 2017 the couple announced they are expecting their second child. On 4 January 2018 Ashling gave birth to their daughter named Sienna. They later on had a third child, a girl, Nausicaa.

In November 2016, Zaytsev and Ashling Sirocchi were the testimonials for the Italian alimentary harvest promoted by the Banco Alimentare Foundation.

=== Outside of volleyball ===
Zaytsev has appeared in advertisements for companies including Red Bull, DHL Express, Prozis and Toyota. He is also an ambassador for World Food Programme in Italy. He had also voiced the eponymous protagonist in the Italian dub of the 2018 film Bumblebee.

== Sporting achievements ==
=== CEV Champions League ===
- 2016/2017 - with Sir Sicoma Colussi Perugia

=== CEV Cup ===
- 2014/2015, with Dinamo Moscow

=== FIVB Club World Championship ===
- Brazil 2021 – with Cucine Lube Civitanova

==== National championships ====
- 2011/2012 Italian SuperCup, with Lube Banca Macerata
- 2013/2014 Italian Championship, with Lube Banca Macerata
- 2015/2016 Emir of Qatar Cup, with Al Arabi
- 2016/2017 Italian SuperCup, with Sir Safety Perugia
- 2017/2018 Italian Cup, with Sir Safety Perugia
- 2017/2018 Italian Championship, with Sir Safety Perugia
- 2022/2023 Italian Championship, with Cucine Lube Civitanova

=== National team ===
- 2011 CEV European Championship
- 2012 Olympic Games
- 2013 FIVB World League
- 2013 CEV European Championship
- 2014 FIVB World League
- 2015 FIVB World Cup
- 2015 CEV European Championship
- 2016 Olympic Games

=== Individually ===
- 2010 Serie A2 – Most valuable player
- 2012 Italian Championship – Most valuable player
- 2013 FIVB World League – Best outside spiker
- 2013 CEV European Championship – Best server
- 2013 Best Italian Volleyball Player by Super Volley
- 2015 FIVB World Cup – Best opposite spiker
- 2015 CEV European Championship – Best opposite spiker
- 2016 Emir of Qatar Cup – Most valuable player
- 2017 CEV Champions League – Best outside spiker
