= Radek Mach =

Czech volleyball player (born 1984)

Personal information
- Nationality: Czech
- Born: 28 September 1984 (age 42)
- Height: 2.06 m (6 ft 9 in)
- Weight: 105 kg (231 lb)
- Spike: 344 cm (135 in)
- Block: 333 cm (131 in)

Volleyball information
- Position: Middle blocker

Career
Teams
	VK Ceske Budejovice

National team
2015–	Czech Republic

Radek Mach (born 28 September 1984) is a Czech male volleyball player. He is part of the Czech Republic men's national volleyball team.
