= Stijn Dejonckheere =

Belgian volleyball player (born 1988)

Personal information
- Nationality: Belgian
- Born: 21 January 1988 (age 38)
- Height: 185.42 cm (6 ft 1 in)
- Weight: 85 kg (187 lb)
- Spike: 335 cm (132 in)
- Block: 310 cm (122 in)

Volleyball information
- Number: 6 (national team)

Career
Years	Teams
2015	Knack Roeselare

National team
2015	Belgium

Stijn Dejonckheere (born 21 January 1988) is a Belgian male volleyball player. He is part of the Belgium men's national volleyball team. On club level he plays for Knack Roeselare.
