= Sten Esna =

Estonian volleyball player (born 1982)

Sten Esna (born 24 August 1982) is an Estonian volleyball player and coach.

He was born in Tallinn. His younger brother is volleyball player Asko Esna. In 2009 he graduated from Tallinn University of Technology in marketing speciality.

He began his volleyball career in 1999. He is played at volleyball club Pärnu VK, and Tallinn Audentes. 2001–2003 the club Pärnu VK won Estonian championships. 2000–2011 he was a member of Estonian national volleyball team. He has also played several seasons in France, for Rennes Volley (2006–2009) and Narbonne Volley (2009–2010).

Since 2020 he is the main coach of Tallinn University's women's team.
