= Asko Esna =

Estonian volleyball player (born 1986)

Asko Esna (born 1 May 1986) is an Estonian volleyball player.

He was born in Tallinn. His older brother is volleyball player and coach Sten Esna.

He began his volleyball career in 1997, coached by Johannes Noormägi. He has played at volleyball club Tallinna Selver. 2007–2012 he was a member of Estonian national volleyball team.

2013–2019 he worked as a coach at the sport club Saaremaa SK. Since 2019 he is coaching the club TalTech Volleyball.
