= Volley Treviso =

- Ground: Palestre La Ghirada (Capacity: 250)
- Chairman: (Italy) David Moro
- Manager: (Italy) Michele Zanin
- League: Serie B Group D
- Website: Club home page

Uniforms
| Home | Away |

Volley Treviso is a professional volleyball team based in Treviso. They were known at the past with the sponsorship name Sisley. The team plays at the Serie B.

== Achievements ==
- Italian Volleyball League (9): 1994, 1996, 1998, 1999, 2001, 2003, 2004, 2005, 2007
- Coppa Italia (4): 1993, 2000, 2004, 2005, 2007
- Italian Super Cup (7):1998, 2000, 2001, 2003, 2004, 2005, 2007
- CEV Champions League (4): 1995, 1999, 2000, 2006
- CEV Cup (2): 1994, 2011
- CEV Challenge Cup (4): 1991, 1993, 1998, 2003
- European Super Cup (2): 1994, 1999

== 2017-2018 Team ==
REF:

| N° | Nome | Ruolo | Data di nascita | Nazionalità sportiva |
|---|---|---|---|---|
| 1 | Fabio Dal Col | C | | Italy |
| 2 | Lorenzo Molinari | S | | Italy |
| 3 | Enrico Basso | C | | Italy |
| 4 | Giandomenico Zanatta | C | | Italy |
| 5 | Giacomo Tonello | P | | Italy |
| 6 | Alberto Pol | S | | Italy |
| 7 | Tommaso Carlesso | L | | Italy |
| 9 | Alessandro Novello | S | | Italy |
| 10 | Antonio De Giovanni | P | | Italy |
| 12 | Joshua Pascon | S | | Italy |
| 14 | Massimo Ostuzzi | S | | Italy |
| 15 | Alberto Venturini | S | | Italy |
| 16 | Sebastiano Santi | L | | Italy |

== Famous players ==
- (Italy) Andrea Anastasi
- (Italy) Lorenzo Bernardi
- (Italy) Dante Boninfante
- (Italy) Luca Cantagalli
- (Italy) Alberto Cisolla
- (Italy) Giorgio De Togni
- (Italy) Alessandro Farina
- (Italy) Alessandro Fei
- (Italy) Andrea Gardini
- (Italy) Leondino Giombini
- (Italy) Pasquale Gravina
- (Italy) Jiří Kovář
- (Poland) (Italy) Michał Łasko
- (Italy) Pier Paolo Lucchetta
- (Italy) Gabriele Maruotti
- (Italy) Gian Paolo Montali
- (Italy) Samuele Papi
- (Italy) Gilberto Passani
- (Italy) Damiano Pippi
- (Italy) Giulio Sabbi
- (Italy) Luca Tencati
- (Italy) Paolo Tofoli
- (Italy) Valerio Vermiglio
- (Italy) Fabio Vullo
- (Italy) Andrea Zorzi
- (Argentina) Marcos Milinkovic
- (Brazil) Gustavo
- (Brazil) Marcelinho
- (Brazil) Marcelo Negrão
- (Brazil) Ricardo Garcia (Ricardinho)
- (Bulgaria) Dimo Tonev
- (Egypt) Abdalsalam Abdallah
- (France) Bertrand Carletti
- (France) Pierre Pujol
- (Germany) Stefan Hübner
- (Netherlands) Peter Blangé
- (Netherlands) Rob Bontje
- (Netherlands) Robert Horstink
- (Netherlands) Jan Posthuma
- (Netherlands) Bas van de Goor
- (Netherlands) Ron Zwerver
- (Russia) (Italy) Oleg Antonov
- (Russia) Stanislav Dineykin
- (Serbia) Novica Bjelica
- (Serbia) Nikola Grbić
- (Slovakia) Emanuel Kohút
- (South Korea) Kim Ho-Chul
- (Sweden) Bengt Gustafson
- (Ukraine) (Russia) Dmitrij Fomin

== Famous coaches ==
- (Italy) Daniele Bagnoli
- (Italy) Nerio Zanetti
- (Argentina) Raúl Lozano
- (Brazil) Paulo Sevciuc
- (Brazil) Renan
- (Sweden) Anders Kristiansson
