= Gabriele Maruotti =

Italian volleyball player (born 1988)

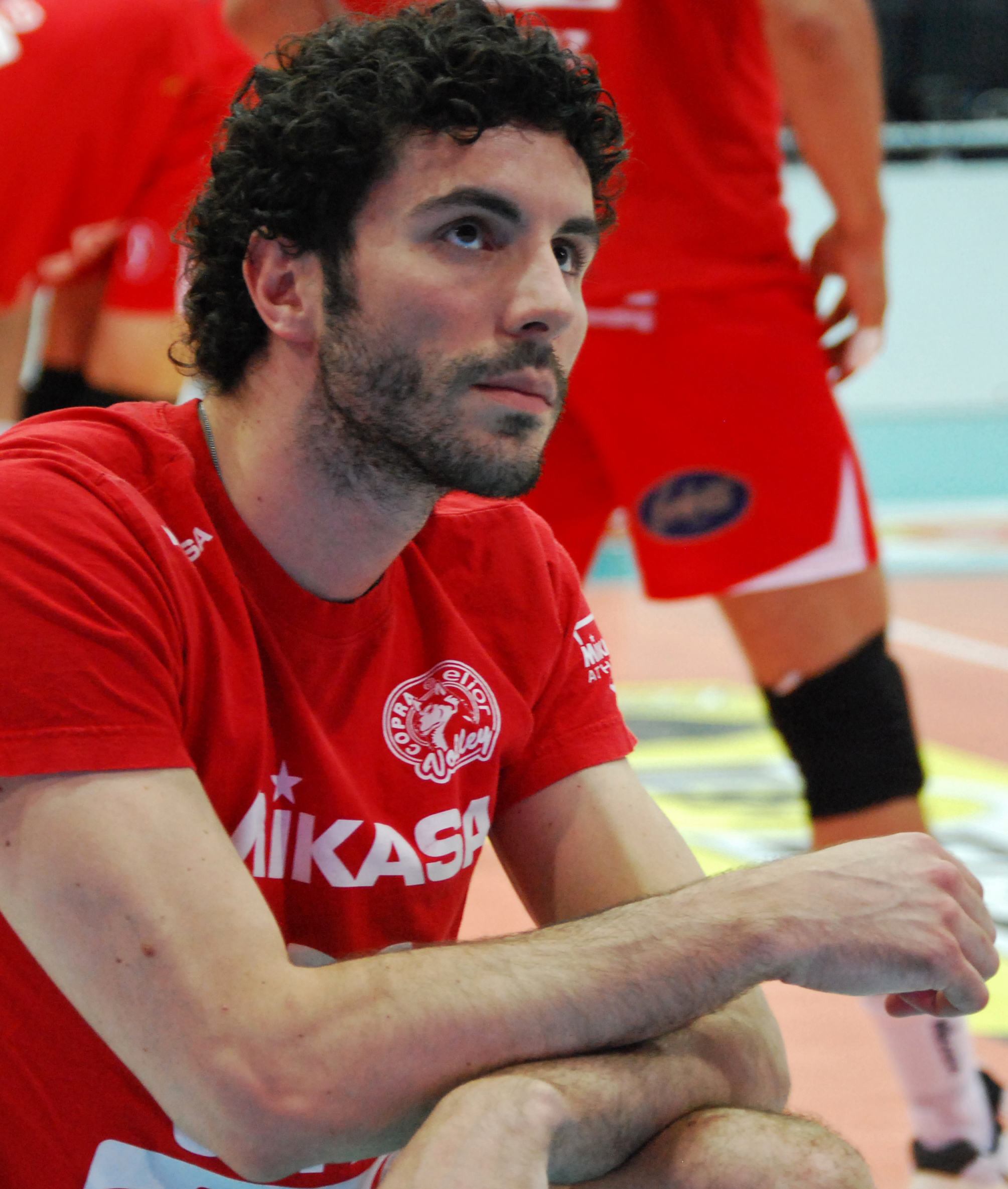
- Maruotti in 2013

Personal information
- Nationality: Italian
- Born: 25 March 1988 (age 38); Fiumicino, Italy
- Height: 195 cm (6 ft 5 in)
- Weight: 92 kg (203 lb)
- Spike: 348 cm (137 in)
- Block: 340 cm (134 in)

Volleyball information
- Number: 6 (national team)

Career
| Years | Teams |
|---|---|
| 2014 | Piemonte volley |

National team
| 2014 | Italy |
Medal record
Men's volleyball
Representing Italy
Mediterranean Games
| Gold medal – first place | 2009 Pescara | Team |

Gabriele Maruotti (born 25 March 1988) is a former Italian male volleyball player. He was part of the Italy men's national volleyball team. On club level he played for Piemonte volley.
