= PalaOlimpia =

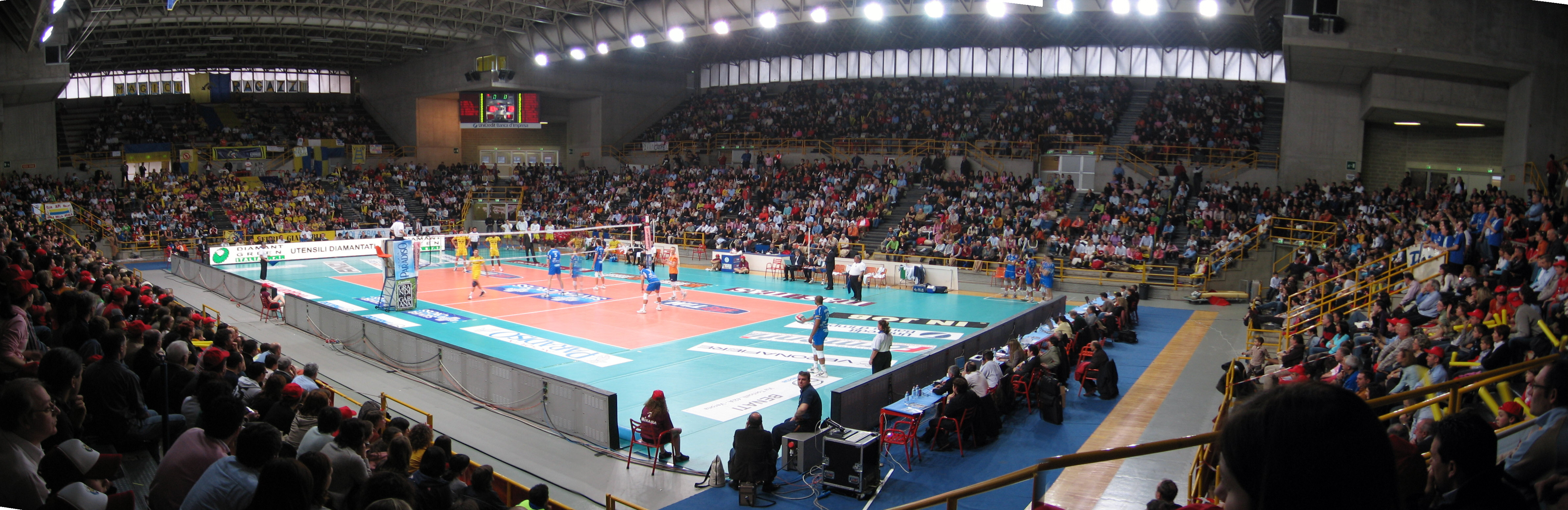
- Interactive map of PalaOlimpia
- Location: Verona, Italy
- Coordinates: 45°26′14.53″N 10°57′53.54″E
- Capacity: 5,350

Construction
- Opened: 1986

Tenant
- Scaligera Verona

The PalaOlimpia, also known as Pala Magis or PalaSport Verona, is a multi-purpose arena in Verona, Italy. It is home to the Scaligera Verona basketball team. In 2010, it hosted matches for the 2010 FIVB Men's World Championship. Its seating capacity is 5,350 spectators.

== See also ==
- List of indoor arenas in Italy

Preceded by Max-Schmeling-Halle (Germany) Berlin	CEV Champions League; Final Venue; 2021	Succeeded by Arena Stožice (Slovenia) Ljubljana
