= Rafael Pascual (volleyball) =

Spanish volleyball player

Personal information
- Full name: Rafael Pascual Cortés
- Nickname: El Toro, El Macho, El León
- Born: 16 March 1970 (age 56); Madrid, Spain
- Height: 1.96 m (6 ft 5 in)

Volleyball information
- Position: Outside hitter
- Number: 14 (1992); 1 (2000)

National team
1991–2007	Spain
Honours
Men's volleyball
Representing Spain
European Championship
Gold medal – first place	2007 Moscow	Team
Summer Universiade
Silver medal – second place	1995 Fukuoka	Team
Mediterranean Games
Silver medal – second place	1993 Narbonne	Team
Bronze medal – third place	1991 Athens	Team

Rafael Pascual Cortés (born 16 March 1970), more commonly known as Rafael Pascual, is a Spanish former volleyball player who is nicknamed "El Toro", "El Macho", and "El León". Pascual is widely regarded as one of the best volleyball players of all time. A two-time Olympian (1992 and 2000), he was named the most valuable player of the 1998 FIVB World Championship in Japan. He led Spain to the gold medal at the 2007 European Championship in Russia.

== Sporting achievements ==
=== National team ===
- 1995 Universiade
- 2007 European Championship

== Individual awards ==
- 1998 FIVB World Championship MVP
- 1999 FIVB World Cup "Best Scorer"
