= Volley Piacenza =

Italian volleyball club

- Founded: 1982
- Dissolved: 2018
- Ground: PalaBanca; Piacenza, Italy (Capacity: 3,700)
- League: Italian Volleyball League

Volley Piacenza was an Italian professional men's volleyball club based in Piacenza, northern Italy. They played in the Italian Volleyball League. The club ceased to exist in 2018 due to financial problems.

Although the club reached the Italian 1st division for the first time only in 2002, after have dominated the Italian 2nd division and winning also the Italian Cup, it has already played 9 finals in Italy, including 5 for the Italian Title(winning only in 2009 versus the strong Trento), 2 for the Italian Cup(won in 2013 and lost in 2006) and 2 for the Italian Supercup (beating Macerata 3–2 in 2009 and losing versus the same team in 2014 again after a tie-break). Piacenza played also a Champion's League final, lost 3–2 in Poland versus Russia's Zenit Kazan, 2 Cev Cup finals (again losing twice) and won 2 other European cups: in 2006 the Top Teams Cup, and in 2013 the Challenge Cup, defeating Ural Ufa from Russia with a 3–0 win in both first and second legs of final, achieving also an impressive 12–0 record, without losing a single set. It's among the strongest teams in Italy and also in Europe since 2003.

== Achievements ==
- CEV Champions League
  2008
- CEV Cup
  2006
- CEV Challenge Cup
  2013
- Italian Championship (SuperLega)
  2009
  2007, 2008, 2013
- Italian Cup
  2014
- Italian SuperCup
  2009
- Italian Championship Serie A2
  2002
- Italian Cup Serie A2
  2002

== Team ==
Team roster – season 2016–2017
LPR Piacenza
No.	Name	Date of birth	Position

Team roster – season 2016–2017
LPR Piacenza
No.	Name	Date of birth	Position
1	(Italy) Loris Manià	January 27, 1979	libero
3	(Italy) Simone Parodi	June 16, 1986	outside hitter
4	(Italy) Aimone Alletti	June 28, 1988	middle blocker
6	(Italy) Samuele Papi	May 20, 1973	outside hitter
7	(Italy) Leonel Marshall Jr.	September 25, 1979	outside hitter
10	(Greece) Georgios Tzioumakas	January 23, 1995	outside hitter
11	(Italy) Hristo Zlatanov	April 21, 1976	Outside hitter
12	(Bulgaria) Viktor Yosifov	October 16, 1985	middle blocker
13	(Italy) Luca Tencati	March 16, 1979	middle blocker
14	(Cuba) Raydel Hierrezuelo	July 14, 1987	setter
15	(Cuba) Fernando Hernandez	September 11, 1989	outside hitter
17	(France) Trevor Clévenot	June 28, 1994	outside hitter
18	(Italy) Francesco Cottarelli	October 16, 1996	setter
Head coach: Alberto Giuliani; Assistant: Marco Camperi

== Notable players ==
- 2002–2003 (Serbia) Đula Mešter
- 2003–2004 (Italy) Simone Rosalba
- 2003–2004 (Cuba) Osvaldo Hernández
- 2003–2007 (Serbia) Nikola Grbić
- 2003–2007, 2008–2010 (Cuba) Leonel Marshall
- 2003–2008 (Italy) Vigor Bovolenta
- 2004–2005 (Brazil) Anderson Rodrigues
- 2005–2008 (Italy) Vencislav Simeonov
- 2006–2008 (Italy) Paolo Cozzi
- 2007–2008 (France) Frantz Granvorka
- 2007–2008 (Brazil) Sérgio Santos
- 2007–2008 (Spain) Israel Rodríguez
- 2006–2010 (Brazil) João Paulo Bravo
- 2007–2010 (Serbia) Novica Bjelica
- 2007–2010 (Italy) Dante Boninfante
- 2007–2010, 2014–2015 (Italy) Marco Meoni
- 2008–2009 (Spain) Guillermo Falasca
- 2009–2010 (Portugal) Valdir Sequeira
- 2010–2013 (United States) Maxwell Holt
- 2011–2012 (Bulgaria) Vladimir Nikolov
- 2011–2012 (Bulgaria) Andrey Zhekov
- 2012–2014 (Cuba) Robertlandy Simón
- 2013–2014 (France) Kévin Le Roux
- 2014–2014 (Italy) Valerio Vermiglio
- 2014–2015 (Russia) Aleksey Ostapenko
- 2003–2017 (Italy) Hristo Zlatanov
- 2010–2017 (Italy) Luca Tencati
- 2011–2017 (Italy) Samuele Papi
