= Umbria Volley =

Umbria Volley was an Italian volleyball club based in the Umbria Region. The club was founded as Pet Company Perugia Volley in 2001. Since the season 2001/02 the club plays in the A1 league, the top league in Italy.

After the season 2011/12, Umbria Volley was closed down and succeeded by Altotevere Volley.

== Famous players ==
- (Poland) Sebastian Świderski(2003-07)
- (Cuba) (Italy) Osvaldo Hernández
- (Spain) Rafael Pascual
- (Spain) Ibán Pérez
- (Germany) Robert Kromm
- (Montenegro) (Serbia) Goran Vujević
- (Serbia) Konstantin Čupković
- (Serbia) Nikola Kovačević
- (Iran) Behnam Mahmoudi
- (Italy) Ivan Zaytsev
