= Gabeca Pallavolo =

Professional volleyball team based in Monza, Italy

Acqua Paradiso Monza Brianza
- Short name: Pallavolo Gabeca
- Founded: 1975
- Ground: PalaIper; Monza; Italy.
- Manager: (Italy) Emanuele Zanini
- League: Italian Volleyball League
- Website: Club home page

Acqua Paradiso Monza Brianza is a professional volleyball team of Pallavolo Gabeca (till 2009 Acqua Paradiso Gabeca Montichiari), based in Monza, Italy. It plays in Italian Volleyball League. It was born in Carpenedolo in 1975. In the next season (2011–12) will play the CEV Cup.

== Achievements ==
- CEV Cup Winners' Cup: 2

== Team 2011/12 ==
1. (Croatia) Tsimafei Zhukouski
2. (Argentina) Luciano De Cecco
3. (Argentina) Facundo Conte
4. (Italy) Simone Buti
5. (Finland) Konstantin Shumov
6. (Italy) Marcello Forni
7. (Italy) Carlo Mor
8. (Serbia) Miloš Nikić
9. (United States) Sean Rooney
10. (Italy) Marco Molteni
11. (Italy) Mauro Gavotto
12. (Greece) Nicolas Roumeliotis
13. (Italy) Salvatore Rossini
14. (Italy) Edoardo Ciabattini
15. (Hungary) Tamas Kaszap

== Notable former players ==
- (Italy) Lorenzo Bernardi
- (Italy) Marcello Forni
- (Italy) Ferdinando De Giorgi
- (Italy) Marco Meoni
- (Italy) Marco Molteni
- (Italy) Francesco Dall'Olio
- (Italy) Alessandro Paparoni
- (Italy) Michele Pasinato
- (Italy) Damiano Pippi
- (Italy) Andrea Sartoretti
- (Italy) Cristian Savani
- (Argentina) Luciano De Cecco
- (Argentina) Facundo Conte
- (Brazil) Mauricio Lima
- (Brazil) Marcelo Negrão
- (Bulgaria) Plamen Kostantinov
- (Bulgaria) Ventceslav Simeonov
- (Cuba) Osvaldo Hernández
- (Spain) Rafael Pascual
- (Finland) Mikko Esko
- (Finland) Konstantin Shumov
- (Germany) Stefan Hubner
- (India) Jimmy George
- (Netherlands) Guido Görtzen
- (Netherlands) Robert Horstink
- (Netherlands) Reinder Nummerdor
- (Netherlands) Jan Posthuma
- (Netherlands) Ronald Zoodsma
- (Russia) Evgueni Mitkov
- (Russia) Semyon Poltavskiy
- (Serbia) Dejan Bojović
- (Serbia) Andrija Gerić
- (Serbia) Nikola Grbić
- (Serbia) Miloš Nikić
- (United States) Sean Rooney
- (United States) Ryan Millar
