= Piemonte Volley =

Italian volleyball club

Bre Banca Lannutti Cuneo
- Short name: Piemonte Volley
- Ground: Palasport di Cuneo, Cuneo, Italy
- Manager: Alberto Giuliani
- League: Italian Volleyball League
- Website: Club home page

Piemonte Volley, known for sponsorship reasons as Bre Banca Lannutti Cuneo, was an Italian professional volleyball club based in Cuneo. The club was founded in 1958 under the name of Cuneo Volley Ball Club and renamed Piemonte Volley in 2001, after the acquisition of glorious but long-ailing CUS Torino Pallavolo.

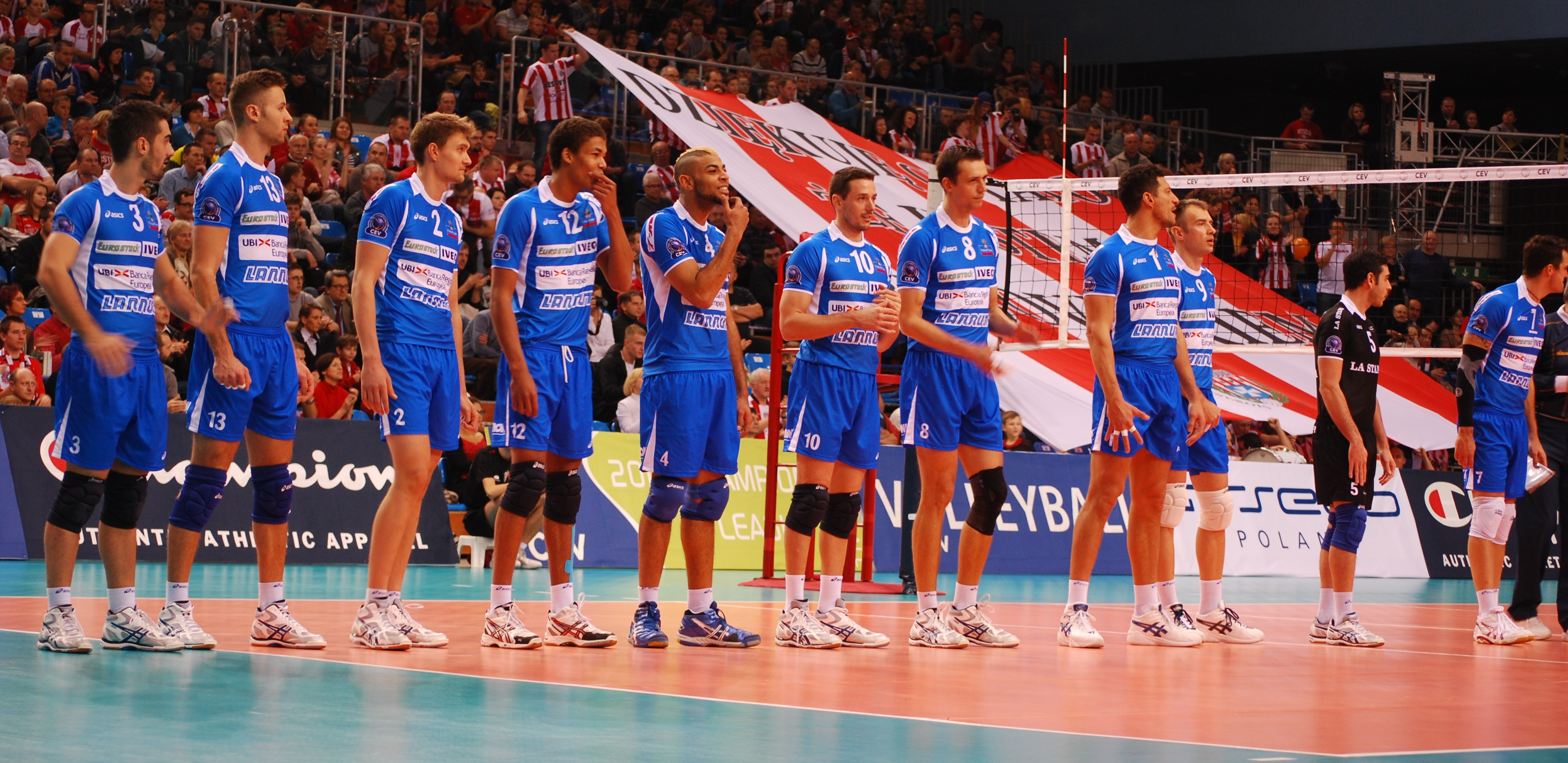
Team roster in 2012

== Famous players ==
- (Serbia) Nikola Grbić
- (Serbia) Vladimir Grbić
- (Italy) Andrea Anastasi
- (Italy) Michele Baranowicz
- (Poland) (Italy) Michał Łasko
- (Italy) Gabriele Maruotti
- (Brazil) Giba
- (Bulgaria) Vladimir Nikolov
- (Bulgaria) Tsvetan Sokolov
- (Cuba) Javier González
- (France) Hubert Henno
- (France) Earvin N'Gapeth
- (France) Antonin Rouzier
- (France) Guillaume Samica
- (Russia) (Italy) Oleg Antonov
- (Russia) Ruslan Olikhver
- (Russia) Aleksandr Volkov
- (Slovakia) Emanuel Kohut
- (Spain) Rafael Pascual
- (Belgium) Wout Wijsmans
- (Bulgaria) Lyubomir Ganev

== Achievements ==
- Italian Volleyball League: 1
- Italian Volleyball Cup: 4
- Italian Volleyball SuperCup: 3
- CEV Cup Winner's Cup: 2
- CEV Cup: 3
- CEV SuperCup: 2
