= M. Roma Volley =

- Founded: 2006
- Ground: Palazzetto dello Sport, Rome (Capacity: 3,500)
- Chairman: (Italy) Massimo Mezzaroma
- League: Italian Volleyball League

Uniforms
Home	Away

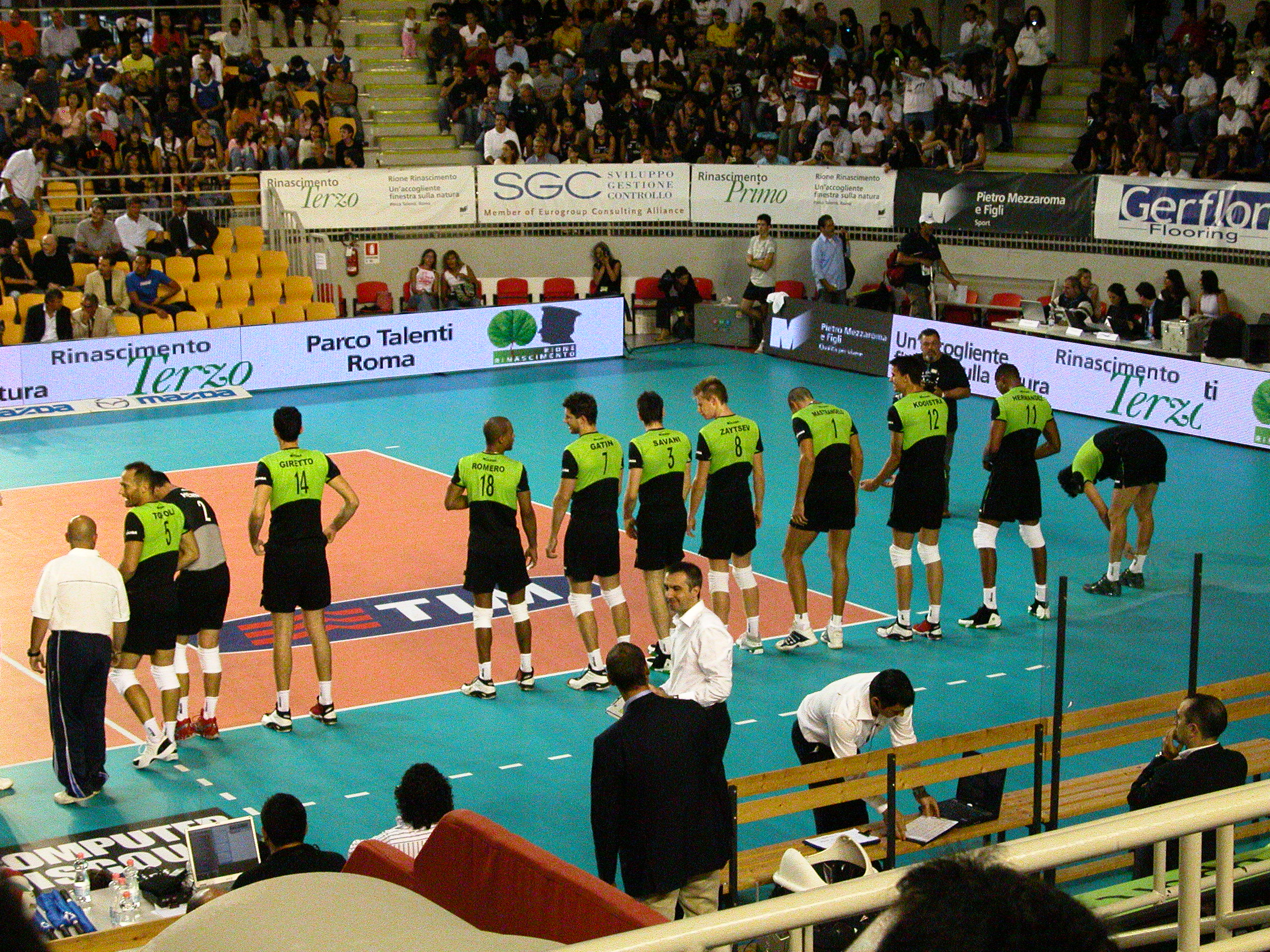
The M. Roman Volley formation in its first home match in 2006.

M. Roma Volley is an Italian volleyball club playing in the Italian Volleyball League. The club was founded in 2006. It currently plays in the Italian Serie A1 (Italy's top division).
