= List of CEV club competition winners =

The European Volleyball Confederation (CEV) is the governing body for Volleyball in Europe. It organises three club competitions for men: the CEV Champions League (formerly European Cup), the CEV Cup (formerly Cup Winners Cup) and the CEV Challenge Cup. There was also the CEV Super Cup (it) but this competition no longer exist.

Russian side CSKA Moscow have won a record total of 16 titles in CEV competitions, two more than Modena Volley. Only three teams have won every CEV club competition: Modena Volley, Volley Treviso and Parma Volley, the three from Italy.

Italian clubs have won the most titles (82), ahead of clubs from the Soviet Union (26) and Russia (18). Italy is the only country in European volleyball history whose clubs won the three main competitions in the same season in eleven occasions : 1983–84, 1991–92, 1992–93, 1993–94, 1994–95, 1996–97, 1997–98, 2005–06, 2009–10, 2010–11, 2025–26.

== Winners ==
=== By club ===
CSKA Moscow is the most crowned one in CEV Champions League with 13 titles, in CEV Cup Dynamo Moscow and Modena Volley both have won 4 titles. In the CEV Challenge Cup Modena Volley stand alone with a record of 5 titles. The following table lists all the men's clubs that have won at least one CEV club competition.

Key

CCL	CEV Champions League
CC	CEV Cup
CCC	CEV Challenge Cup
CSC	CEV Super Cup (defunct)

Most in category

List of CEV club competition winners
Rk.	Club	Country	CCL	CC	CCC	CSC	Total
1	CSKA Moscow	Russia	13			3	16
2	Modena Volley	Italy	4	4	5	1	14
3	Volley Treviso	Italy	4	2	4	2	12
4	Parma Volley	Italy	2	3	2	2	9
5	Piemonte Volley	Italy		3	2	2	7
6	Volley Lube	Italy	2		4		6
=	Ravenna Volley	Italy	3		1	2	6
=	Zenit-Kazan	Russia	6				6
=	Belgorod Volley	Russia	3	2	1		6
10	Trentino Volley	Italy	4	1			5
11	Avtomobilist Leningrad	Russia		2	2		4
=	Dynamo Moscow	Russia		4			4
=	Dinamo București	Romania	3	1			4
=	Paris Volley	France	1	2		1	4
15	Olympiacos Piraeus	Greece		2	1		3
=	Rapid București	Romania	3				3
=	Kedzierzyn Kozle	Poland	3				3
=	Elektrotechnika	Soviet Union		3			3
19	Burevestnik Alma-Ata	Soviet Union	2				2
=	Fakel Novy Urengoy	Russia			2		2
=	Sir Volley Perugia	Italy	2				2
=	CUS Torino	Italy	1	1			2
=	Gabeca Volley	Italy		2			2
=	Gonzaga Milano	Italy		1	1		2
=	Volley Piacenza	Italy		1	1		2
=	Allianz Milano	Italy			2		2
=	Tours VB	France	1	1			2
=	AS Cannes	France		1	1		2
=	Volleyball Brno	Czechoslovakia	2				2
=	Červená hvězda Bratislava	Czechoslovakia	1	1			2
=	CSKA Sofia	Bulgaria	1	1			2
32	Zvezda Voroshilovgrad	Soviet Union		1			1
=	Lokomotiv Novosibirsk	Russia	1				1
=	Vero Volley Monza	Italy		1			1
=	Zinella Volley	Italy		1			1
=	Roma Volley	Italy		1			1
=	Volley Padova	Italy			1		1
=	Roma VBC	Italy			1		1
=	Falconara Volley	Italy			1		1
=	Palermo Volley	Italy			1		1
=	Umbria Volley	Italy			1		1
=	BluVolley Verona	Italy			1		1
=	Bunge Ravenna	Italy			1		1
=	Gas Sales Piacenza	Italy		1			1
=	Dukla Liberec	Czechoslovakia	1				1
=	Rudá Hvězda Praha	Czechoslovakia		1			1
=	Leipzig VBC	East Germany	1				1
=	VfB Friedrichshafen	Germany	1				1
=	Berlin Recycling	Germany		1			1
=	Moerser SC	Germany			1		1
=	Płomień Milowice	Poland	1				1
=	AZS Częstochowa	Poland			1		1
=	LKPS Lublin	Poland			1		1
=	Halkbank Ankara	Turkey		1			1
=	Ziraat Bankası	Turkey		1			1
=	Arkas Spor	Turkey			1		1
=	Fenerbahçe Grundig	Turkey			1		1
=	Piet Zoomers	Netherlands		1			1
=	Star Lift Voorburg	Netherlands			1		1
=	S.C. Espinho	Portugal		1			1
=	Knack Randstad	Belgium		1			1
=	Lokomotyv Kharkiv	Ukraine		1			1
=	ACH Volley Bled	Slovenia		1			1
=	OK Vojvodina	Serbia			1		1
=	Narbonne Volley	France			1		1
=	Asseco Resovia	Poland		1			1
=	Projekt Warsaw	Poland			1		1

=== By country ===
The following table lists all the countries whose clubs have won at least one CEV competition, and is updated as of 05 May, 2025 (in chronological order).

Key
CCL	CEV Champions League
CC	CEV Cup
CCC	CEV Challenge Cup
CSC	CEV Super Cup (defunct)

Most in category

List of CEV club competition winners by country
Rk.	Nationality	CCL	CC	CCC	CSC	Total
1	Italy	22	22	29	9	82
2	Soviet Union	15	7	2	2	26
3	Russia	10	5	3		18
4	France	2	4	2	1	9
5	Poland	4	1	3		8
6	Romania	6	1			7
7	Czechoslovakia	4	2			6
8	Turkey		2	2		4
9	Greece		2	1		3
10	Germany	1	1	1		3
11	Bulgaria	1	1			2
=	Netherlands		1	1		2
13	East Germany	1				1
=	Belgium		1			1
=	Portugal		1			1
=	Ukraine		1			1
=	Slovenia		1			1
=	Serbia			1		1
=	CIS				1	1

== See also ==
- European Volleyball Confederation
- Clubs with the most international titles in volleyball
