= Andrea Giani =

Italian volleyball player and coach

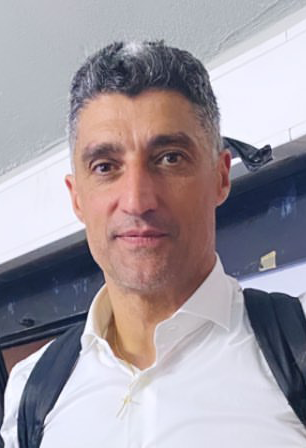

Personal information
- Born: 22 April 1970 (age 56); Naples, Italy
- Height: 1.96 m (6 ft 5 in)

Coaching information
- Current team: France; ZAKSA Kędzierzyn-Koźle
Previous teams coached
Years	Teams
2007–2008; 2008–2012; 2013–2016; 2015–2016; 2017–2021; 2017–2019; 2019–2023; 2022– 2024–	Modena Volley; M. Roma Volley; Calzedonia Verona; Slovenia; Germany; Power Volley Milano; Modena Volley; France; ZAKSA Kędzierzyn-Koźle

Volleyball information
- Position: Middle blocker
- Number: 13 (national team)

Career
Years	Teams
1982–1985; 1985–1996; 1996–2007	Pallavolo Sabaudia; Pallavolo Parma; Modena Volley

National team
1988–2005	Italy (474)
Honours
Men's volleyball
Representing Italy
Olympic Games
Silver medal – second place	1996 Atlanta
Silver medal – second place	2004 Athens
Bronze medal – third place	2000 Sydney
FIVB World Championship
Gold medal – first place	1990 Brazil
Gold medal – first place	1994 Greece
Gold medal – first place	1998 Japan
FIVB World Cup
Gold medal – first place	1995 Japan
FIVB World Grand Champions Cup
Gold medal – first place	1993 Japan
FIVB World League
Gold medal – first place	1991 Milan
Gold medal – first place	1992 Genoa
Gold medal – first place	1994 Milan
Gold medal – first place	1995 Rio de Janeiro
Gold medal – first place	1997 Moscow
Gold medal – first place	1999 Mar del Plata
Gold medal – first place	2000 Rotterdam
Bronze medal – third place	1993 São Paulo
Goodwill Games
Gold medal – first place	1990 Seattle
CEV European Championship
Gold medal – first place	1993 Finland
Gold medal – first place	1995 Greece
Gold medal – first place	1999 Austria
Gold medal – first place	2003 Germany
Head coach Slovenia
CEV European Championship
Silver medal – second place	2015 Poland
Head coach Germany
CEV European Championship
Silver medal – second place	2017 Poland
Head coach France
Olympic Games
Gold medal – first place	2024 Paris
FIVB Nations League
Gold medal – first place	2022 Bologna
Gold medal – first place	2024 Łódź
CEV European Championship
Silver medal – second place	2026 Bulgaria/Finland/Italy/Romania

Andrea Giani (Italian pronunciation: [anˈdrɛːa ˈdʒaːni]; born 22 April 1970) is an Italian professional volleyball coach and former player who serves as head coach for the France national team and the Polish PlusLiga team, ZAKSA Kędzierzyn-Koźle.

Giani achieved numerous successes in the 1990s, including three World Championships with his national team. He was an all-rounder able to play both as an outside hitter and as a middle blocker, but he played several times as an opposite spiker too.

In 2008, Giani was inducted into the International Volleyball Hall of Fame.

== Career ==
Giani's father, Dario, was a rower who took part in the 1964 Summer Olympics for Italy. After having trained with his father, now a rowing coach, Andrea tried for a brief period as a football player. In 1985, the 14-year-old Giani began his career as a volleyball player for the local team of Sabaudia, in the Southern Latium, where he lived. Soon, news about his qualities spread and attracted attention from the two main volleyball clubs of Italy of the period: Panini Modena and Santal/Maxicono Parma.

Giani was chosen to play for the latter, initially with the junior team under Gian Paolo Montali as coach. Giani's first final for scudetto in the Parma major team was in 1987. Parma was defeated, as well as in the following seasons.

Giani won his first scudetto in 1990, which was to be followed by four more. In the meantime, in 1988, Giani had scored against Finland his first cap for Italy. His career with the Azzurri colours ended in 2005 after a total of 474 caps (record), making him one of the most renowned players in Italy and the world for his excellent technical and jumping capabilities. With Italy Giani won three World Championship titles in a row (1990, 1994 and 1998) and four European Championship titles (1993, 1995, 1999, 2003), and many others. He is a five-time Olympian who won three medals at the Olympic Games, but his team never won the gold medal, even though Italy was generally considered one of the favourites. He won silver medals at the 1996 and 2004 Summer Olympics, and a bronze medal at the 2000 Summer Olympics. He also played at the 1988 and 1992 Summer Olympics.

During his career, Giani became renowned for his polyvalence, starting as a middle blocker, who turned into a power attacker and passer. Before Modena, Giani played in Parma 1985–1996 and won three Italian Championship Serie A and Club World Championship.

After having quit the national team, Giani played for Cimone Modena until 2008 and won two CEV Champions League. He took the reins of the team as manager starting from the 2007–2008 season. His nickname is Giangio and was the season winner CEV Challenge Cup 2008. In 2009–2010, Giani won the Championship Serie A2 with M. Roma Volley.

== Coaching ==
Giani became the manager of the Slovenia men's national volleyball team in May 2015. A few months later, he led Slovenia to victory in the European Volleyball League, which secured them a spot at the 2016 FIVB Volleyball World League. In October, Slovenia unexpectedly won their first medal in a major volleyball tournament after reaching the final of the 2015 European Championship, where they were defeated by France. In 2017, Giani replaced Vital Heynen as head coach of the Germany men's national volleyball team.

== Honours ==
=== As a player ===
- CEV European Champions Cup
  - 1996–97 – with Modena Volley
  - 1997–98 – with Modena Volley
- FIVB Club World Championship
  - Parma 1989 – with Maxicono Parma
- CEV Cup
  - 1987–88 – with Maxicono Parma
  - 1988–89 – with Maxicono Parma
  - 1989–90 – with Maxicono Parma
- CEV Challenge Cup
  - 1991–92 – with Maxicono Parma
  - 1994–95 – with Maxicono Parma
  - 2003–04 – with Modena Volley
- Domestic
  - 1989–90 Italian Cup, with Maxicono Parma
  - 1989–90 Italian Championship, with Maxicono Parma
  - 1991–92 Italian Cup, with Maxicono Parma
  - 1991–92 Italian Championship, with Maxicono Parma
  - 1992–93 Italian Championship, with Maxicono Parma
  - 1996–97 Italian Cup, with Modena Volley
  - 1996–97 Italian Championship, with Modena Volley
  - 1997–98 Italian SuperCup, with Modena Volley
  - 1997–98 Italian Cup, with Modena Volley
  - 2001–02 Italian Championship, with Modena Volley

=== As a coach ===
- CEV Cup
  - 2022–23 – with Modena Volley
- CEV Challenge Cup
  - 2007–08 – with Modena Volley
  - 2015–16 – with Calzedonia Verona

=== Individual awards ===
- 1994: FIVB World League – Most valuable player
- 1995: FIVB World Cup – Most valuable player
- 1998: FIVB World League – Best blocker

=== State awards ===
- 2000: Knight of the Order of Merit of the Italian Republic
- 2004: Officer of the Order of Merit of the Italian Republic
