= Andrea Gardini =

Italian volleyball player and coach

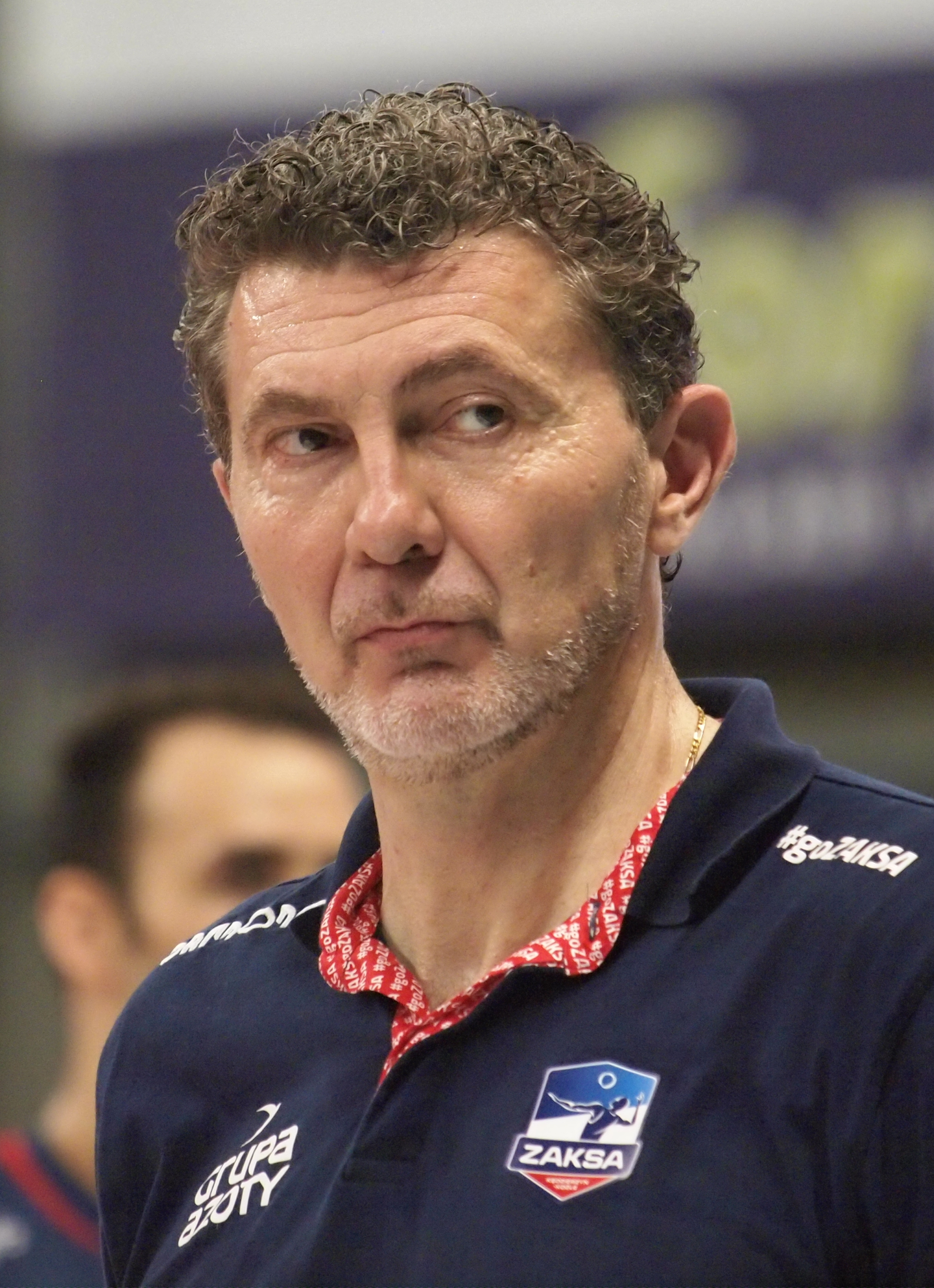
- Gardini as ZAKSA Kędzierzyn-Koźle head coach in 2018

Personal information
- Born: 1 October 1965 (age 61); Bagnacavallo, Italy
- Height: 2.02 m (6 ft 8 in)

Coaching information
Previous teams coached
| Years | Teams |
|---|---|
| 2007–2010; 2011–2013; 2014–2017; 2017–2019; 2019–2020; 2021–2022; 2023–2024; 2024–2025; 2025– | Italy (AC); Poland (AC); AZS Olsztyn; ZAKSA Kędzierzyn-Koźle; Gas Sales Piacenza; Jastrzębski Węgiel; Skra Bełchatów; Olympiacos; Galatasaray |

Volleyball information
- Position: Middle blocker
- Number: 1

Career
| Years | Teams |
|---|---|
| 1984–1986; 1986–1988; 1988–1990; 1990–1993; 1993–1999; 1999–2001; 2001–2003; 2003–2004 | Pallavolo Torino; Zinella Volley; Sisley Treviso; Messaggero Ravenna; Sisley Treviso; Roma Volley; Modena Volley; Volley Piacenza |

National team
| 1986–2000 | Italy (418) |
Honours
Men's volleyball
Representing Italy
Olympic Games
| Silver medal – second place | 1996 Atlanta |
| Bronze medal – third place | 2000 Sydney |
FIVB World Championship
| Gold medal – first place | 1990 Brazil |
| Gold medal – first place | 1994 Greece |
| Gold medal – first place | 1998 Japan |
FIVB World Cup
| Gold medal – first place | 1995 Japan |
| Silver medal – second place | 1989 Japan |
FIVB World Grand Champions Cup
| Gold medal – first place | 1993 Japan |
FIVB World League
| Gold medal – first place | 1990 Osaka |
| Gold medal – first place | 1991 Milan |
| Gold medal – first place | 1992 Genoa |
| Gold medal – first place | 1994 Milan |
| Gold medal – first place | 1997 Moscow |
| Gold medal – first place | 2000 Rotterdam |
| Silver medal – second place | 1996 Rotterdam |
| Bronze medal – third place | 1993 São Paulo |
Goodwill Games
| Gold medal – first place | 1990 Seattle |
CEV European Championship
| Gold medal – first place | 1989 Sweden |
| Gold medal – first place | 1993 Finland |
| Gold medal – first place | 1995 Greece |
| Gold medal – first place | 1999 Austria |

Andrea Gardini (born 1 October 1965) is an Italian professional volleyball coach and former player, a silver (Atlanta 1996) and bronze (Sydney 2000) Olympic Games medallist, three–time World Champion (1990, 1994, 1998), and four–time European Champion (1989, 1993, 1995, 1999). Gardini was the captain of the Italian team at the 2000 Olympics. He was inducted into the Volleyball Hall of Fame in 2007.

== Personal life ==
His son, Davide (born 1999), is also a volleyball player.

== Career ==
=== As a coach ===
In 2011, Gardini became an assistant coach of Andrea Anastasi in the Polish national volleyball team. On 10 July 2011, they led Poland to a bronze medal of the 2011 World League, the nation's first ever World League medal. On 18 September 2011, Poland, led by Anastasi and Gardini, won a bronze medal at the 2011 European Championship. In the same year, their team won a silver medal at the 2011 World Cup and qualified for the Olympic Games London 2012. For the first time in its history, the Polish national team won three medals in one year. On 8 July 2012, Poland won the final match of the 2012 World League against United States (3–0). In October 2013, Anastasi and Gardini were dismissed as coaches of the Polish national team.

On 22 December 2014, Gardini was appointed new head coach of Indykpol AZS Olsztyn. In May 2015, he signed a new contract with the club from Olsztyn.

It was announced that he was appointed as the head coach of the Galatasaray Men's Volleyball Team on December 15, 2025.

== Honours ==
=== As a player ===
- CEV European Champions Cup
  - 1991–92 – with Messaggero Ravenna
  - 1992–93 – with Messaggero Ravenna
  - 1994–95 – with Sisley Treviso
  - 1998–99 – with Sisley Treviso
- FIVB Club World Championship
  - São Paulo 1991 – with Messaggero Ravenna
- CEV Cup
  - 1986–87 – with Tartarini Bologna
  - 1993–94 – with Sisley Treviso
- CEV Challenge Cup
  - 1997–98 – with Sisley Treviso
  - 1999–00 – with Piaggio Roma
- Domestic
  - 1990–91 Italian Cup, with Messaggero Ravenna
  - 1990–91 Italian Championship, with Messaggero Ravenna
  - 1993–94 Italian Championship, with Sisley Treviso
  - 1995–96 Italian Championship, with Sisley Treviso
  - 1997–98 Italian Championship, with Sisley Treviso
  - 1998–99 Italian SuperCup, with Sisley Treviso
  - 1998–99 Italian Championship, with Sisley Treviso
  - 1999–00 Italian Championship, with Piaggio Roma
  - 2001–02 Italian Championship, with Casa Modena Salumi

=== As a coach ===
- Domestic
  - 2018–19 Polish Cup, with ZAKSA Kędzierzyn-Koźle
  - 2018–19 Polish Championship, with ZAKSA Kędzierzyn-Koźle
  - 2020–21 Polish Championship, with Jastrzębski Węgiel
  - 2021–22 Polish SuperCup, with Jastrzębski Węgiel

=== Individual awards ===
- 1988: Olympic Games – Best spiker
- 1989: FIVB World Cup – Best spiker
- 1990: FIVB World League – Best blocker

=== State awards ===
- 2000: Knight of the Order of Merit of the Italian Republic
