= Raúl Lozano (volleyball) =

Argentine volleyball player and coach

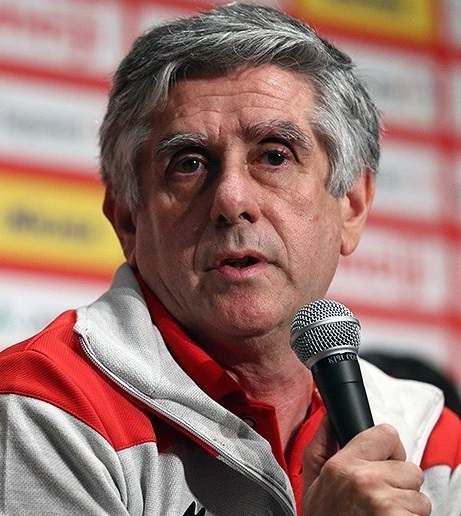

Personal information
- Full name: Raúl Lucio Lozano
- Born: 3 September 1956 (age 70); La Plata, Argentina
- Height: 1.68 m (5 ft 6 in)

Coaching information
- Current team: Ukraine
Previous teams coached
| Years | Teams |
|---|---|
| 1974–1978; 1978–1981; 1981–1983; 1983–1987; 1988–1989; 1989–1990; 1991–1992; 1992–1994; 1994–1997; 1997–1998; 1998–2000; 1999–2000; 2000–2001; 2002–2003; 2003–2004; 2005–2008; 2009–2011; 2015–2016; 2016–2017; 2017–2019; 2022–2024; 2024– | Estudiantes de La Plata; Esgrima La Plata; Obras Sanitarias; Ferro Carril Oeste; Rex Pordenone; CE.DI.SA Salerno; Olio Venturi Spoleto; Misura Milano; Spain; Volley Lube; Iveco Palermo; Spain; Sisley Treviso; Iraklis Thessaloniki; Volley Lube; Poland; Germany; Czarni Radom; Iran; China; JT Thunders; Ukraine |

Volleyball information
- Position: Setter
Honours
Men's volleyball
Head coach Poland
FIVB World Championship
| Silver medal – second place | 2006 Japan |
Head coach Germany
European League
| Gold medal – first place | 2009 Portimão |
Head coach Ukraine
European League
| Gold medal – first place | 2024 Osijek |

Raúl Lucio Lozano (born 3 September 1956) is an Argentine professional volleyball coach and former player. He serves as head coach for the Ukraine national team.

== Personal life ==
He is married to Laura. On 2 February 1996, his wife gave birth to their son Matias, who was born in Barcelona.

== Career as coach ==
Lozano with Volley Milano winner two gold medal in FIVB Club World Championship. He directed the national teams of Spain in 1994-1997 and 1999-2000, 2000-2001 Volley Treviso and Germany in 2008-2011. He won two European Cups (with Milan and Palermo, respectively) as well as the Italian National League with Sisley Treviso. He led Spain to a silver medal finish in the World University Games in Japan and a fifth-place finish in the World League and World Cup in 1999. Lozano in 2005-2008 worked with Poland national volleyball team. In 2006 led Poland to silver medal of the World Championship 2006. On December 6, 2006 received a state award granted by the Polish President Lech Kaczyński – Knight's Cross of Polonia Restituta for outstanding contribution to the development of Polish sport, for achievements in training.

In April 2015 he signed a contract with Polish club Cerrad Czarni Radom. After parting ways with the Serbian Slobodan Kovac, the Iranian federation chose Raul Lozano as his replacement. On November 17, 2015 he has been officially named as head coach of the Iran national volleyball team. He led Iran to their first appearance at the Summer Olympics in 2016 Rio. Lozano after one year stayed in Asia, Raul Lozano has signed on as the new head coach of the Chinese national team, which makes him the program's first-ever foreign head coach.

== Honours ==
=== As a coach ===
- CEV Champions League
  - 2000–01 – with Sisley Treviso
- FIVB Club World Championship
  - Treviso 1992 – with Misura Milano
- CEV Cup
  - 1992–93 – with Misura Milano
  - 1993–94 – with Milan Volley
- CEV Challenge Cup
  - 1998–99 – with Iveco Palermo
- Domestic
  - 1981–82 Argentine Cup, with Obras Sanitarias
  - 1982–83 Argentine Championship, with Obras Sanitarias
  - 1984–85 Argentine Championship, with Ferro Carril Oeste
  - 1986–87 Argentine Championship, with Ferro Carril Oeste
  - 2000–01 Italian SuperCup, with Sisley Treviso
  - 2000–01 Italian Championship, with Sisley Treviso
- Universiade
  - 1995 Summer Universiade, with Spain

=== State awards ===
- 2006: Knight's Cross of Polonia Restituta

Sporting positions
| Preceded by (Poland) Stanisław Gościniak | Head coach of Poland; 2005–2008 | Succeeded by (Argentina) Daniel Castellani |
