= Soviet Men's Volleyball Championship =

Soviet volleyball tournament

Soviet Union Championship
- Sport: Volleyball
- Founded: 1933
- First season: 1933
- Folded: 1991
- Administrator: USRRV
- Country: Soviet Union
- Continent: Europe
- Level on pyramid: 1st Level
- Domestic cup: Soviet Union Cup
- International cups: CEV Champions League; CEV Cup; CEV Challenge Cup

The history of the USSR championships began on April 4, 1933. On that day the first matches among the national teams of the five cities were held at the Palace of Metalworkers in Dnepropetrovsk. These competitions, as well as the next three similar championships, were officially called the All-Union Volleyball Holidays.

The USSR championships among club teams representing various voluntary sports societies and departments were held since 1938. In 1956, 1959, 1963 and 1967 the USSR champion title was played in the Summer Spartakiad of the Peoples of the USSR. In 1937, 1941-1944 and 1964 there were no USSR Championship competitions.

In the 1991/92 season the USSR Volleyball Federation organized the CIS Open Championship, a number of its participants in 1992 played in parallel the first Russian Championship.

== List of Champions ==
- 1933 : Moscow
- 1934 : Moscow
- 1935 : Moscow
- 1936 : Moscow
- 1938 : Spartak Leningrad
- 1939 : Spartak Leningrad
- 1940 : Spartak Moscow
- 1945 : Dynamo Moscow
- 1946 : Dynamo Moscow
- 1947 : Dynamo Moscow
- 1948 : Dynamo Moscow
- 1949 : CSKA Moscow
- 1950 : CSKA Moscow
- 1951 : Dynamo Moscow
- 1952 : VVS MVO Moscow
- 1953 : CSKA Moscow
- 1954 : CSKA Moscow
- 1955 : CSKA Moscow
- 1956 : Ukraine
- 1957 : Spartak Leningrad
- 1958 : CSKA Moscow
- 1959 : Leningrad
- 1960 : CSKA Moscow
- 1961 : CSKA Moscow
- 1962 : CSKA Moscow
- 1963 : Moscow
- 1965 : CSKA Moscow
- 1966 : CSKA Moscow
- 1967 : Ukraine
- 1968 : Kalev Tallinn
- 1969 : Burevestnik Alma-Ata
- 1970 : CSKA Moscow
- 1971 : CSKA Moscow
- 1972 : CSKA Moscow
- 1973 : CSKA Moscow
- 1974 : CSKA Moscow
- 1975 : CSKA Moscow
- 1976 : CSKA Moscow
- 1977 : CSKA Moscow
- 1978 : CSKA Moscow
- 1979 : CSKA Moscow
- 1980 : CSKA Moscow
- 1981 : CSKA Moscow
- 1982 : CSKA Moscow
- 1983 : CSKA Moscow
- 1984 : Radiotechnik Riga
- 1985 : CSKA Moscow
- 1986 : CSKA Moscow
- 1987 : CSKA Moscow
- 1988 : CSKA Moscow
- 1989 : CSKA Moscow
- 1990 : CSKA Moscow
- 1991 : CSKA Moscow
- 1992 : VC Shakhtar Donetsk

== See also ==
- Volleyball in Russia
- Russian Volleyball Super League
