= Philippe Blain =

French volleyball player and coach

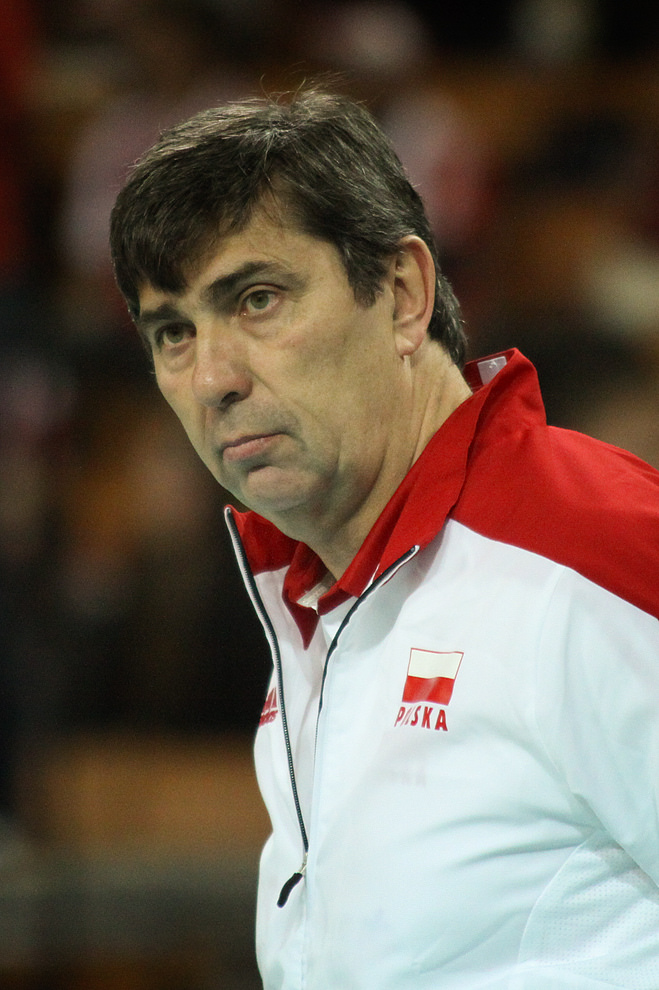

Personal information
- Full name: Philippe Georges Antoine Blain
- Born: 20 May 1960 (age 66); Montpellier, France
- Height: 1.93 m (6 ft 4 in)

Coaching information
- Current team: Cheonan Hyundai Capital Skywalkers
Previous teams coached
Years	Teams
1991–1993; 1994–2000; 2000–2001; 2001–2012; 2013–2015; 2013–2016; 2016–2017; 2017–2021; 2021–2024; 2024–	Piemonte Volley; AS Cannes; Arago de Sète; France; Montpellier Volley; Poland (AC); Skra Bełchatów; Japan (AC); Japan; Cheonan Hyundai Capital Skywalkers

Volleyball information
- Position: Outside hitter

Career
Years	Teams
1980–1985; 1986–1989; 1989–1990	Montpellier Volley; Montpellier Volley; Piemonte Volley

National team
1980–1991	France (340)
Honours
Men's volleyball
Representing France
CEV European Championship
Silver medal – second place	1987 Belgium
Bronze medal – third place	1985 Netherlands
Head coach France
FIVB World Championship
Bronze medal – third place	2002 Argentina
FIVB World League
Silver medal – second place	2006 Moscow
CEV European Championship
Silver medal – second place	2009 Turkey
Head coach Japan
FIVB Nations League
Silver medal – second place	2024 Łódź
Bronze medal – third place	2023 Gdańsk
AVC Asian Championship
Gold medal – first place	2023 Iran

Philippe Georges Antoine Blain (born 20 May 1960) is a French professional volleyball coach and former player. He was a member of the France national team from 1984 to 1987 and a participant in the Olympic Games Seoul 1988. Blain serves as head coach for Cheonan Hyundai Capital Skywalkers. He also acted as Secretary of FIVB Technical & Coaching commission.

== Career as coach ==
Since 1998 he has coached in France, first at AS Cannes, then, since 2000, at Arago de Sète. Starting from 2001 he was a head coach of the France men's national volleyball team.

In 2013 he was announced as new assistant coach to new coach Stephane Antiga. They have been working with Poland men's national volleyball team. On September 21, 2014 Poland won a title of World Champion 2014. On October 27, 2014 he received a state award granted by the Polish President Bronisław Komorowski – Gold Cross of Merit for outstanding contribution to the development of Polish sport.

On 29 March 2016, he signed a contract with PGE Skra Bełchatów and replaced the previous head coach, Miguel Angel Falasca.

Blain coached the Japanese men's national volleyball team since 2017, first as an assistant coach and then as head coach from 2022 onwards. Under his guidance, Japan would qualify for two Olympics: the 2020 Tokyo Olympics as the host nation and the 2024 Paris Olympics through the qualifying matches of 2023. Following the 2024 Olympics, Blain announced his departure from the team.

== Honours ==
=== As a coach ===
- CEV Cup
  - 1998–99 – with AS Cannes
- Domestic
  - 1994–95 French Cup, with AS Cannes
  - 1994–95 French Championship, with AS Cannes
  - 1997–98 French Cup, with AS Cannes
  - 2016–17 Polish Championship, with PGE Skra Bełchatów

=== Individual awards ===
- 1986: FIVB World Championship – Most valuable player
- 1987: CEV European Championship – Most valuable player

=== State awards ===
- 2014: Gold Cross of Merit
- 2014: Medaille de la Jeunesse et des Sports
