= 1990 FIVB Volleyball Men's Club World Championship =

1990 Men's Club World Championship
Tournament details
- Host country: Italy
- Dates: 1–2 December
- Teams: 8 (from 4 confederations)

Final positions
- Champions: (Italy) Mediolanum Milano (1st title)

Tournament awards
- MVP: (Italy) Claudio Galli (MIL)

The 1990 FIVB Volleyball Men's Club World Championship was the 2nd edition of the event. It was held in Milan, Italy from 1 to 2 December 1990.

== Final standing ==
Rank	Team
1st place, gold medalist(s)	(Italy) Mediolanum Milano
2nd place, silver medalist(s)	(Brazil) Banespa São Paulo
3rd place, bronze medalist(s)	(Italy) Maxicono Parma
4	(Italy) il Messaggero Ravenna
5	(Soviet Union) CSKA Moscow
6	(Italy) Philips Modena
7	(Algeria) ASP Mahad
8	(Japan) JT Thunders

1990 Men's Club World Champions
(Italy)
Mediolanum Milano
1st title

== Awards ==
- Most Valuable Player

(Italy) Claudio Galli (Mediolanum Milano)
