= Mohammadreza Beik =

Iranian volleyball player

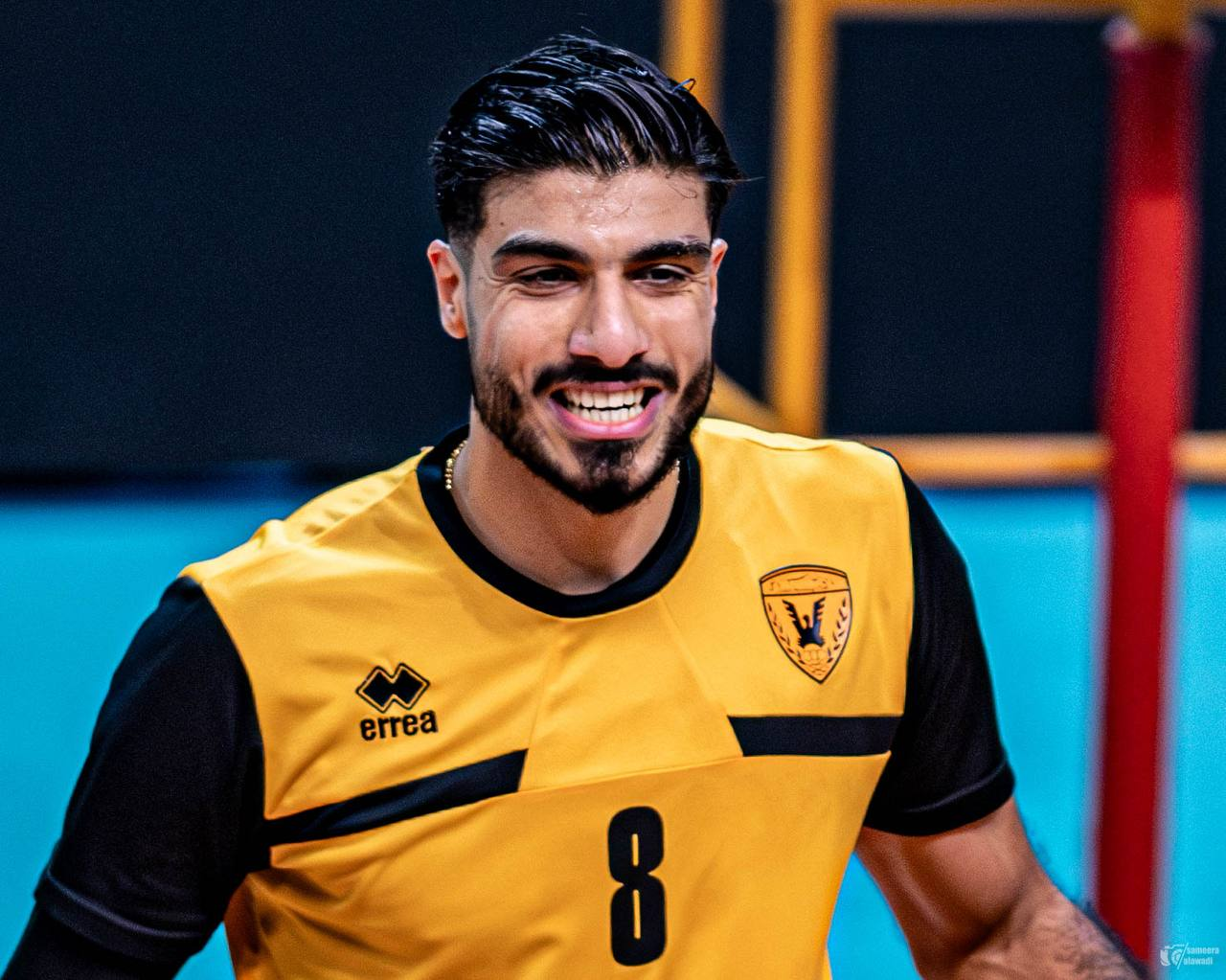

Personal information
- Full name: Mohammadreza Beik
- Nationality: Iran
- Born: February 8, 2000 Mashhad, Iran
- Height: 1.97 m (6 ft 6 in)
- Weight: 95 kg (209 lb)
- Spike: 350 cm (138 in)
- Block: 330 cm (130 in)

Volleyball information
- Position: Outside hitter
- Current club: CSKA Sofia
- Number: 8

Career
- Years: Team
- 2016–2020: Sepehr Sadra (Iran)
- 2020–2021: Mes Rafsanjan (Iran)
- 2021–2022: SC Caldas (Portugal)
- 2022–2023: Akaa Volley (Finland)
- 2023–2024: Athlos Orestiada (Greece)
- 2023–2024: Jakarta LavAni Allo Bank Electric (Indonesia)
- 2024–2025: Qadsia SC (Kuwait)
- 2025–2026: CSKA Sofia (Bulgaria)
- Updated on September 24, 2025

Mohammadreza Beik (born 8 February 2000 in Mashhad, Iran) is an Iranian volleyball player who plays as an Outside hitter. He currently plays for CSKA Sofia in the Bulgarian Volleyball League.

== Career ==
Beik began his volleyball career in Iran’s youth national teams and several domestic clubs. After performing well in the Iranian Super League, he moved abroad to continue his professional career.

=== European career ===
Beik first moved to Portugal in 2021 and signed with SC Caldas. The team finished seventh in the Portuguese Volleyball League that season.

In 2022, he joined Akaa-Volley in Finland, signing a one-year contract. The club finished third in the Finnish League and participated in the CEV Challenge Cup.

After his stint in Finland, Beik played in Greece and later joined CSKA Sofia in Bulgaria.

== Achievements ==
- Played professionally in Portugal, Finland, Greece, Indonesia, Kuwait, and Bulgaria
- Best receiver in the Finnish Volleyball League
- Participated in the CEV Challenge Cup with Akaa Volley
- Gold medal – 2018 Asian U20 Championship, Bahrain
- Silver medal – Four-nation youth tournament in Russia
