= 2015–16 LNV Pro A Men =

Pro A Men
- League: French League Volleyball
- Sport: Volleyball
- Teams: 14

2015–16
- Season MVP: Thibault Rossard (Sète)
- Top scorer: Marien Moreau (Sète)
- Relegated to Pro B: Asul Lyon VB; Narbonne Volley; Nancy VB

Finals
- Champions: Paris Volley (9th title)
- Runners-up: Arago de Sète

Pro A seasons
- ← 2015 2017 →

The 2015–16 Pro A is the 68th season of French League Volleyball. It is the highest level of volleyball competition for men in France. The French League Volleyball is sanctioned by Fédération Française de Volley-Ball

== League Format ==
Classification

The classification round will use double round-robin format. Each team plays the other 13 teams twice totaling the number of matches to 182 matches.

Ranking

Points system will be used to determine the ranking of teams.

Match won in 3–0 or 3–1: 3 match points for the winner; 0 match points for the loser
Match won in 3–2: 2 match points for the winner; 1 match point for the loser

Succeeding tie-break criteria(in order):

1. number of matches won
2. Set ratio
3. Point ratio

Playoff

- At the end of classification round, Top eight teams continue to the playoff round.
- Teams ranked 9th to 11th are as is.
- Bottom three teams are relegated to Pro B League.

Quarterfinals

- Best-of-three series

1st vs 8th (QF1)
2nd vs 7th (QF2)
3rd vs 6th (QF3)
4th vs 5th (QF4)

- The higher seed hosts first round; lower seed hosts second round.
  The higher seed hosts third round if necessary.

Semifinals

- Best-of-three series

QF1 winner vs QF4 winner
QF2 winner vs QF3 winner

- The higher seed hosts first round; lower seed hosts second round.
  The higher seed hosts third round if necessary.

Finals

- One-game series

== Regular season ==
| Pos | Team | Pld | W | L | Pts | SW | SL | SR | SPW | SPL | SPR | Qualification or relegation |
|---|---|---|---|---|---|---|---|---|---|---|---|---|
| 1 | Arago de Sète V.B | 26 | 20 | 6 | 57 | 67 | 35 | 1.914 | 2388 | 2194 | 1.088 | Playoffs |
| 2 | Tours VB | 26 | 17 | 9 | 55 | 66 | 37 | 1.784 | 2398 | 2172 | 1.104 | Playoffs |
| 3 | Chaumont VB 52 | 26 | 19 | 7 | 54 | 63 | 41 | 1.537 | 2426 | 2357 | 1.029 | Playoffs |
| 4 | Spacer's Toulouse Volley | 26 | 15 | 11 | 49 | 63 | 45 | 1.400 | 2429 | 2280 | 1.065 | Playoffs |
| 5 | GFC Ajaccio VB | 26 | 16 | 10 | 46 | 56 | 46 | 1.217 | 2344 | 2234 | 1.049 | Playoffs |
| 6 | Paris Volley | 26 | 15 | 11 | 44 | 57 | 48 | 1.188 | 2313 | 2275 | 1.017 | Playoffs |
| 7 | Nantes Rezé Métropole Volley | 26 | 14 | 12 | 42 | 57 | 51 | 1.118 | 2403 | 2424 | 0.991 | Playoffs |
| 8 | Stade Poitevin Poitiers | 26 | 15 | 11 | 41 | 53 | 47 | 1.128 | 2244 | 2259 | 0.993 | Playoffs |
| 9 | Beauvais Oise Université Club | 26 | 12 | 14 | 37 | 47 | 52 | 0.904 | 2263 | 2293 | 0.987 | |
| 10 | AS Cannes VB | 26 | 15 | 11 | 37 | 53 | 56 | 0.946 | 2397 | 2395 | 1.001 | |
| 11 | Montpellier-Agglomération-Volley UC | 26 | 11 | 15 | 33 | 44 | 54 | 0.815 | 2225 | 2254 | 0.987 | |
| 12 | ASUL Lyon Volley | 26 | 8 | 18 | 29 | 44 | 61 | 0.721 | 2328 | 2417 | 0.963 | Relegated to Pro B |
| 13 | Narbonne Volley | 26 | 2 | 24 | 13 | 30 | 75 | 0.400 | 2185 | 2461 | 0.888 | Relegated to Pro B |
| 14 | Grand Nancy VB | 26 | 3 | 23 | 9 | 21 | 73 | 0.288 | 1951 | 2279 | 0.856 | Relegated to Pro B |

| | SET | ASC | LYO | BEA | CHA | AJA | GNA | MON | NAN | NAR | PAR | TOU | POI | TVB |
|---|---|---|---|---|---|---|---|---|---|---|---|---|---|---|
| Arago de Sète V.B | | 3–0 | 0–3 | 3–0 | 3–0 | 1–3 | 3–0 | 2–3 | 3–1 | 3–1 | 3–0 | 3–2 | 3–2 | 3–2 |
| AS Cannes VB | 2–3 | | 3–2 | 3–2 | 1–3 | 2–3 | 3–1 | 3–0 | 1–3 | 3–2 | 3–2 | 3–2 | 3–1 | 1–3 |
| ASUL Lyon Volley | 1–3 | 2–3 | | 3–0 | 3–2 | 1–3 | 3–0 | 1–3 | 3–1 | 3–2 | 2–3 | 0–3 | 2–3 | 1–3 |
| Beauvais Oise Université Club | 3–1 | 0–3 | 3–1 | | 0–3 | 1–3 | 3–1 | 3–0 | 1–3 | 3–0 | 1–3 | 3–2 | 0–3 | 1–3 |
| Chaumont VB 52 | 1–3 | 2–3 | 3–1 | 3–1 | | 3–1 | 3–0 | 0–3 | 3–2 | 3–1 | 3–1 | 1–3 | 0–3 | 3–1 |
| GFC Ajaccio VB | 0–3 | 3–1 | 3–2 | 3–1 | 2–3 | | 3–0 | 0–3 | 1–3 | 3–0 | 2–3 | 0–3 | 1–3 | 0–3 |
| Grand Nancy VB | 0–3 | 1–3 | 3–0 | 1–3 | 0–3 | 0–3 | | 1–3 | 2–3 | 3–2 | 0–3 | 0–3 | 2–3 | 0–3 |
| Montpellier-Agglomération-Volley UC | 0–3 | 2–3 | 1–3 | 1–3 | 1–3 | 1–3 | 2–3 | | 3–0 | 3–0 | 0–3 | 1–3 | 3–1 | 1–3 |
| Nantes Rezé Métropole Volley | 3–1 | 3–0 | 3–0 | 1–3 | 1–3 | 1–3 | 3–1 | 1–3 | | 3–2 | 2–3 | 3–1 | 1–3 | 3–2 |
| Narbonne Volley | 1–3 | 2–3 | 1–3 | 0–3 | 1–3 | 2–3 | 3–1 | 2–3 | 1–3 | | 1–3 | 2–3 | 0–3 | 3–2 |
| Paris Volley | 1–3 | 2–3 | 3–2 | 3–1 | 2–3 | 0–3 | 3–0 | 3–0 | 3–2 | 3–0 | | 3–2 | 3–0 | 0–3 |
| Spacer's Toulouse Volley | 1–3 | 3–0 | 3–0 | 3–2 | 2–3 | 2–3 | 3–0 | 3–0 | 3–2 | 3–1 | 3–2 | | 2–3 | 0–3 |
| Stade Poitevin Poitiers | 3–2 | 3–0 | 3–2 | 1–3 | 0–3 | 1–3 | 3–1 | 1–3 | 0–3 | 3–0 | 3–0 | 1–3 | | 3–1 |
| Tours VB | 2–3 | 3–0 | 3–0 | 3–1 | 2–3 | 3–1 | 3–0 | 3–1 | 2–3 | 3–0 | 3–2 | 3–2 | 3–0 | |

== Playoffs ==
Quarterfinals
1 | Sète (2) | 3 | 3 | X
8 | Poitiers (0) | 2 | 0 | X
5 | GFC Ajaccio (2) | 3 | 3 | X
4 | Toulouse (0) | 0 | 1 | X
3 | Chaumont (0) | 0 | 2 | X
6 | Paris (2) | 3 | 3 | X
7 | Nantes Rezé (0) | 0 | 1 | X
2 | Tours (2) | 3 | 3 | X

Semifinals
1 | Sète (2) | 3 | 3 | X
5 | GFC Ajaccio (0) | 1 | 2 | X
6 | Paris (2) | 0 | 3 | 3
2 | Tours (1) | 3 | 2 | 0

Finals
1 | Sète | 0
6 | Paris | 3

=== Quarterfinals ===
| Date | Time | | Score | | Set 1 | Set 2 | Set 3 | Set 4 | Set 5 | Total | Report |
|---|---|---|---|---|---|---|---|---|---|---|---|
| 08 Apr | 20:00 | Tours | 3–0 | Nantes Rezé | 25–15 | 25–17 | 25–22 | | | 75–54 | Report |
| 12 Apr | 20:00 | Nantes Rezé | 1–3 | Tours | 25–23 | 22–25 | 20–25 | 18–25 | | 85–98 | Report |

| Date | Time | | Score | | Set 1 | Set 2 | Set 3 | Set 4 | Set 5 | Total | Report |
|---|---|---|---|---|---|---|---|---|---|---|---|
| 09 Apr | 15:00 | Sète | 3–2 | Poitiers | 21–25 | 25–21 | 25–22 | 22–25 | 15–13 | 108–106 | Report |
| 13 Apr | 20:00 | Poitiers | 0–3 | Sète | 17–25 | 18–25 | 19–25 | | | 54–75 | Report |

| Date | Time | | Score | | Set 1 | Set 2 | Set 3 | Set 4 | Set 5 | Total | Report |
|---|---|---|---|---|---|---|---|---|---|---|---|
| 09 Apr | 20:00 | GFC Ajaccio | 3–0 | Toulouse | 25–16 | 25–15 | 25–16 | | | 75–47 | Report |
| 13 Apr | 20:00 | Toulouse | 1–3 | GFC Ajaccio | 25–27 | 16–25 | 25–21 | 21–25 | | 87–98 | Report |

| Date | Time | | Score | | Set 1 | Set 2 | Set 3 | Set 4 | Set 5 | Total | Report |
|---|---|---|---|---|---|---|---|---|---|---|---|
| 09 Apr | 20:00 | Chaumont | 0–3 | Paris | 23–25 | 24–26 | 26–28 | | | 73–79 | Report |
| 13 Apr | 20:00 | Paris | 3–2 | Chaumont | 20–25 | 25–23 | 25–22 | 18–25 | 15–13 | 103–108 | Report |

=== Semifinals ===
| Date | Time | | Score | | Set 1 | Set 2 | Set 3 | Set 4 | Set 5 | Total | Report |
|---|---|---|---|---|---|---|---|---|---|---|---|
| 23 Apr | 15:00 | Sète | 3–1 | GFC Ajaccio | 27–25 | 17–25 | 28–26 | 25–22 | | 97–98 | Report |
| 28 Apr | 20:30 | GFC Ajaccio | 2–3 | Sète | 26–24 | 25–23 | 19–25 | 20–25 | 17–19 | 107–116 | Report |

| Date | Time | | Score | | Set 1 | Set 2 | Set 3 | Set 4 | Set 5 | Total | Report |
|---|---|---|---|---|---|---|---|---|---|---|---|
| 23 Apr | 20:00 | Tours | 3–0 | Paris | 25–17 | 25–22 | 25–23 | | | 75–62 | Report |
| 27 Apr | 20:00 | Paris | 3–2 | Tours | 25–18 | 21–25 | 25–16 | 14–25 | 15–11 | 100–95 | Report |
| 30 Apr | 20:00 | Tours | 0–3 | Paris | 20–25 | 20–25 | 23–25 | | | 63–75 | Report |

=== Finals ===
| Date | Time | | Score | | Set 1 | Set 2 | Set 3 | Set 4 | Set 5 | Total | Report |
|---|---|---|---|---|---|---|---|---|---|---|---|
| 07 May | 18:00 | Sète | 0–3 | Paris | 20–25 | 26–28 | 23–25 | – | – | 69–78 | Report |

== Final standing ==
| Rank | Team |
|---|---|
| 1st place, gold medalist(s) | Paris Volley |
| 2nd place, silver medalist(s) | Arago de Sète |
| 3rd place, bronze medalist(s) | Tours |
| 4 | GFC Ajaccio |
| 5 | Toulouse |
| 6 | Chaumont |
| 7 | Nantes Rezé |
| 8 | Poitiers |
| 9 | Beauvais |
| 10 | AS Cannes |
| 11 | Montpellier |
| 12 | ASUL Lyon |
| 13 | Narbonne |
| 14 | Grand Nancy |

2016 Pro A League

9th title

Team Roster
CHAUDET David, CORREA LECHALIER Gabriel, SAITTA Davide, HOAG Nicolas, GASPARINI Mitja, FERNANDEZ Jorge, MASSARI Jacopo, GROC Lucas, STEUERWALD Markus, HENNO Benjamin, KABA Kevin, BAHOV Dmitrii, KREEK Ardo, BLANDIN Jules, WALGENWITZ Dimitri
Head coach
ROUGEYRON Dorian
