= LNV Ligue A Masculine =

French men's volleyball league

Marmara SpikeLigue
- Current season, competition or edition: 2026–27 LNV Ligue A Masculine
- Sport: Volleyball
- First season: 1938; 88 years ago
- Administrator: Ligue Nationale de Volley (LNV)
- No. of teams: 14
- Country: France
- Confederation: CEV
- Continent: Europe
- Most recent champion: Montpellier HSC VB (9) (2025–26)
- Most titles: AS Cannes and Tours VB (10 titles)
- Broadcaster: Sport en France
- Level on pyramid: Level 1
- Relegation to: LNV Ligue B
- Domestic cups: Coupe de France; Supercoupe
- International cups: CEV Champions League; CEV Cup; CEV Challenge Cup
- Website: LNV Ligue A

LNV Ligue A Masculine (LAM), known for sponsorship reasons as Marmara SpikeLigue is the top men's volleyball league in France, established in 1938. It is governed by the Ligue Nationale de Volley (LNV), an independent body that runs French professional volleyball under delegation from the French Volleyball Federation (FFVB).
Prior to adopting its current name in 2009, the league used to be known as Pro A, a name it shared with its basketball equivalent.

== Teams ==
Location of the 2024–25 LNV Ligue A Masculine teams.

2024–25 season:

- Arago de Sète
- AS Cannes Volley-Ball
- Chaumont VB 52
- Montpellier HSC VB
- Narbonne Volley
- Nice Volley-Ball
- Paris Volley
- Plessis Robinson VB
- Saint-Nazaire VBA
- Stade Poitevin
- Toulouse Spacer's
- Tourcoing Lille
- Tours VB

=== Former teams ===
- AMSL Fréjus
- Asnières Volley 92
- AS Saint-Jean-d'Illac
- Avignon Volley-Ball
- Beauvais OUC
- Cambrai Volley
- Nantes Rezé MV
- Grenoble Volley Université Club
- Paris Université Club
- Racing Club de France
- Stade Français

== Title holders ==
- 1938 Amicale Paris (1)
- 1939 Volley-Ball Club France (1)
- 1940 Not held due to Battle of France
- 1941 Paris UC
- 1942 Occupied zone : RC France
- 1942 Free zone : RC Cannes
- 1943 Paris UC
- 1944 Not completed
- 1945 Stade Français
- 1946 RC France
- 1947 Montpellier UC
- 1948 RC France
- 1949 Montpellier UC
- 1950 Montpellier UC
- 1951 Montpellier UC
- 1952 Stade Français
- 1953 Stade Français
- 1954 Billancourt
- 1955 Billancourt
- 1956 Billancourt (3)
- 1957 Stade Français
- 1958 Stade Français
- 1959 BNCI Alger (1)
- 1960 Stade Français
- 1961 Stade Français
- 1962 Paris UC
- 1963 Paris UC
- 1964 RC France
- 1965 Asnières
- 1966 Asnières
- 1967 Paris UC
- 1968 Paris UC
- 1969 RC France
- 1970 RC France
- 1971 RC France
- 1972 Montpellier UC
- 1973 Montpellier UC
- 1974 Stade Français (8)
- 1975 Montpellier UC (7)
- 1976 VGA Saint-Maur (1)
- 1977 RC France
- 1978 RC France (9)
- 1979 Asnières
- 1980 Asnières
- 1981 AS Cannes
- 1982 AS Cannes
- 1983 AS Cannes
- 1984 Asnières (6)
- 1985 Grenoble (1)
- 1986 AS Cannes
- 1987 Fréjus
- 1988 Fréjus
- 1989 Fréjus
- 1990 AS Cannes
- 1991 AS Cannes
- 1992 Fréjus (4)
- 1993 PSG–Asnières
- 1994 AS Cannes
- 1995 AS Cannes
- 1996 Paris UC
- 1997 Paris UC
- 1998 Paris UC (9)
- 1999 Stade Poitevin Poitiers
- 2000 Paris Volley
- 2001 Paris Volley (2)
- 2002 Paris Volley (3)
- 2003 Paris Volley (4)
- 2004 Tours VB
- 2005 AS Cannes (9)
- 2006 Paris Volley (5)
- 2007 Paris Volley (6)
- 2008 Paris Volley (7)
- 2009 Paris Volley (8)
- 2010 Tours VB (2)
- 2011 Stade Poitevin Poitiers (2)
- 2012 Tours VB (3)
- 2013 Tours VB (4)
- 2014 Tours VB (5)
- 2015 Tours VB (6)
- 2016 Paris Volley (9)
- 2017 Chaumont VB 52 (1)
- 2018 Tours VB (7)
- 2019 Tours VB (8)
- 2021 AS Cannes (10)
- 2022 Montpellier HSC VB (8)
- 2023 Tours VB (9)
- 2024 Saint-Nazaire VBA (1)
- 2025 Tours VB (10)
- 2026 Montpellier HSC VB (9)

== See also ==
- LNV Ligue A Féminine
