= Pro A =

Pro A may refer to several sports leagues:

== Basketball ==
- LNB Pro A, the first division of professional men's basketball in France
- ProA, the second division of professional men's basketball in Germany and the top level of the 2. Basketball Bundesliga
- Pro A (Tunisia), the first division of professional men's basketball in Tunisia

== Volleyball ==
- Pro A (volleyball), the first division of professional men's volleyball in France
