= Avtomobilist Leningrad =

Avtomobilist Leningrad may refer to:

- VC Avtomobilist Saint Petersburg
- FC Spartak Leningrad
