= 2008–09 CEV Challenge Cup =

- League: CEV Challenge Cup
- Sport: Volleyball
- Duration: 11 October 2008 – 22 March 2009

Finals
- Champions: (Turkey) Arkas İzmir
- Runners-up: (Poland) Jastrzębski Węgiel

CEV Challenge Cup seasons
- ← 2007–08 2009–10 →

The 2008–09 CEV Challenge Cup was the 29th edition of the European Challenge Cup volleyball club tournament, the former CEV Cup.

The Turkish club Arkas İzmir beat Polish club Jastrzębski Węgiel in the final and achieved its first CEV Challenge Cup trophy.

== Final Four ==
- Venue: Karşıyaka Arena, (Turkey) İzmir

Semifinals
21 March
(Greece) EAP	0
(Turkey) Arkas İzmir	3
21 March
(Romania) Tomis Constanța	1
(Poland) Jastrzębski Węgiel	3

Final
22 March
(Turkey) Arkas İzmir	3
(Poland) Jastrzębski Węgiel	2
3rd place match
22 March
(Greece) EAP	0
(Romania) Tomis Constanța	3

=== Semifinals ===
Date	Time		Score		Set 1	Set 2	Set 3	Set 4	Set 5	Total	Report
21 Mar	16:00	EAP (Greece)	0–3	(Turkey) Arkas İzmir	22–25	14–25	19–25			55–75	Report
21 Mar	18:30	Tomis Constanța (Romania)	1–3	(Poland) Jastrzębski Węgiel	23–25	33–35	25–19	21–25		102–104	Report

=== 3rd place ===
Date	Time		Score		Set 1	Set 2	Set 3	Set 4	Set 5	Total	Report
22 Mar	14:00	EAP (Greece)	0–3	(Romania) Tomis Constanța	20–25	13–25	25–27			58–77	Report

=== Final ===
Date	Time		Score		Set 1	Set 2	Set 3	Set 4	Set 5	Total	Report
22 Mar	17:00	Arkas İzmir (Turkey)	3–2	(Poland) Jastrzębski Węgiel	18–25	25–21	18–25	26–24	15–12	102–107	Report

== Final standing ==
Rank	Team
1st place, gold medalist(s)	(Turkey) Arkas İzmir
2nd place, silver medalist(s)	(Poland) Jastrzębski Węgiel
3rd place, bronze medalist(s)	(Romania) Tomis Constanța
4	(Greece) EAP

== Awards ==
- Most valuable player

(Canada) Paul Duerden (Arkas İzmir)

- Best scorer

(Brazil) Ashley Nemer (Tomis Constanța)

- Best Opposite

(Turkey) Gökhan Öner (Arkas İzmir)

- Best blocker

(Romania) Radu Began (Tomis Constanța)

- Best server

(Turkey) Gökhan Öner (Arkas İzmir)

- Best receiver

(Poland) Paweł Rusek (Jastrzębski Węgiel)

- Best setter

(Turkey) Hüseyin Koç (Arkas İzmir)
