= 1992 FIVB Volleyball Men's Club World Championship =

Men's volleyball tournament in 1992

1992 Men's Club World Championship
Tournament details
- Host country: Italy
- Dates: 28–29 November
- Teams: 8 (from 5 confederations)

Final positions
- Champions: (Italy) Misura Milano (2nd title)

Tournament awards
- MVP: (Italy) Lorenzo Bernardi (TRV)

The 1992 FIVB Volleyball Men's Club World Championship was the 4th edition of the event. It was held in Treviso, Italy from 28 to 29 November 1992.

== Final standing ==
Rank	Team
1st place, gold medalist(s)	(Italy) Misura Milano
2nd place, silver medalist(s)	(Italy) Sisley Treviso
3rd place, bronze medalist(s)	(Greece) Olympiacos
4	(Italy) il Messaggero Ravenna
5	(Brazil) Banespa São Paulo
5	(South Korea) Sangmu
7	(Tunisia) Club Africain
7	(Puerto Rico) Plataneros de Corozal

1992 Men's Club World Champions
(Italy)
Misura Milano
2nd title

== Awards ==
- Most Valuable Player

(Italy) Lorenzo Bernardi (Sisley Treviso)
