= Volleyball in Russia =

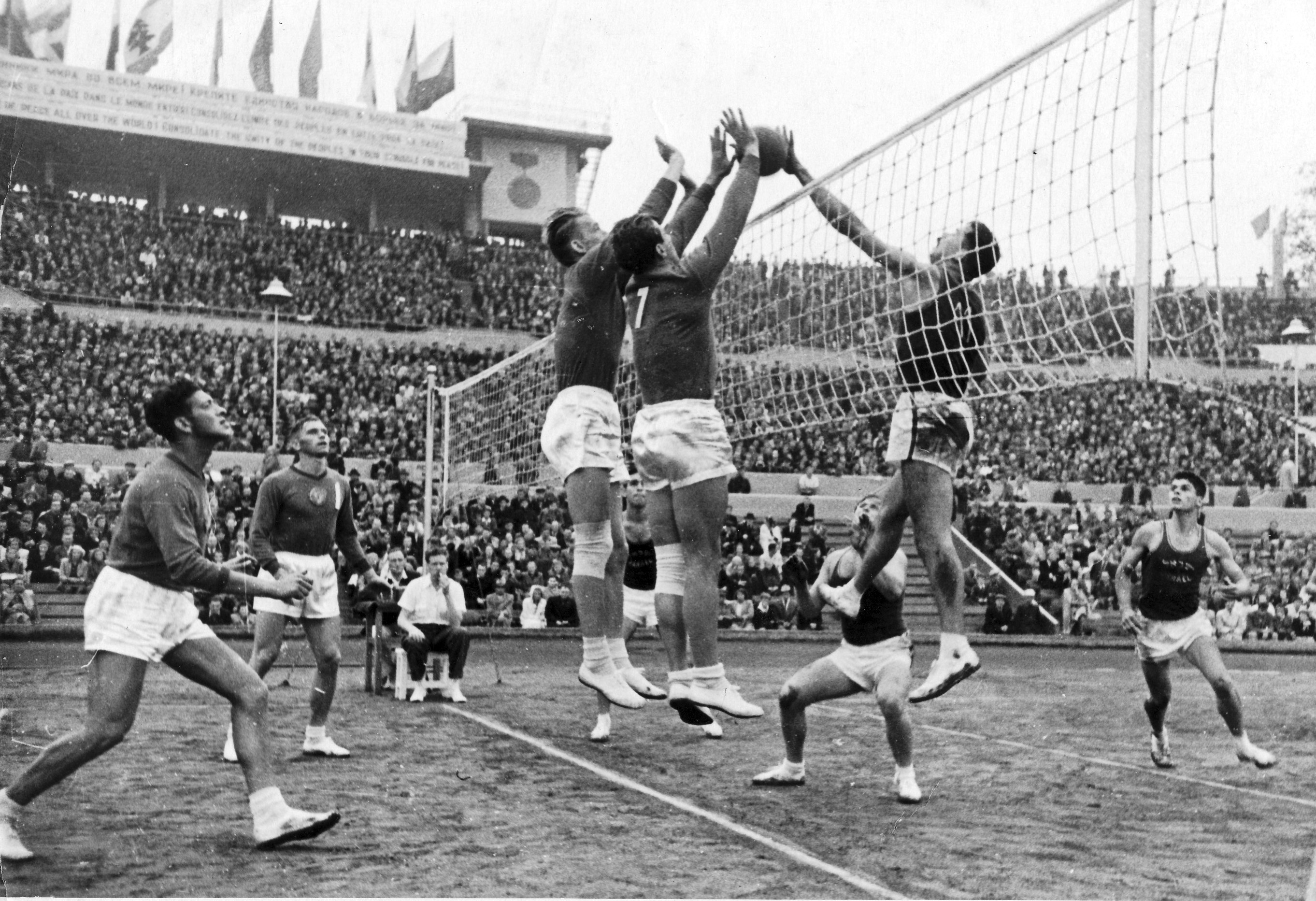
- A game of volleyball between the Israel and the Soviet Union national teams during the 1952 World Championship
- Country: Russia
- Governing body: Russian Volleyball Federation
- National team(s): Men's national team; Women's national team
- First played: 1920/21 (Middle Volga Nizhny Novgorod, Kazan)

International competitions
- FIVB Men's/Women's World Championship; FIVB Men's/Women's World Cup; Summer Olympics

Volleyball is one of the oldest team sports practiced in Russia. The Russian Volleyball Federation is the Official governing body for this sport After the 2022 Russian invasion of Ukraine, the International Volleyball Federation stripped Russia of hosting the men's World Cup in August 2022.

== History ==
=== Development of volleyball in Russia ===
Volleyball began to develop widely in Russia in 1920–1921 in the Middle Volga (Kazan, Nizhny Novgorod). Then it appeared in the Far East in Khabarovsk and Vladivostok, and in 1925 in Ukraine. At that time volleyball was jokingly referred to as "the actors game" in Ukraine. The first volleyball courts in Moscow were located in the yards of the Meyerhold, Kamerny, Revolution and Vakhtangov theaters. On July 28, 1923, the first official volleyball match in Russia took place on Myasnitskaya Street, between the teams of the Higher Art Theatre Workshops and the State Technical School of Cinematography . The pioneers of this new sport were masters of the arts ( Higher Art Theatre Workshopsthe), were famous players was born from this glorious Volleyball school such as Nikolai Bogolyubov and Boris Schukin, George Nisky and Jacob Romas, good players were famous actors Anatoly Ktorov and Rina Zelenaya. So This meeting was a starting point in the history of volleyball in Russia.

=== The Twenties ===
In January 1925 the Moscow Council of Physical Education developed and approved the first official rules of volleyball competitions. Under these rules Moscow championships have been regularly held since 1927.

=== The Thirties ===
In spring 1932 a volleyball discipline was established by the All-Union Council of Physical Culture of the USSR. In 1933, during the CEC session on the stage of the Bolshoi Theatre before the leaders of the ruling party and government of the USSR, an exhibition match between the teams of Moscow and Dnepropetrovsk was played, after that event the first Soviet Men's Volleyball Championship which was officially called the "All-Union Volleyball Festival". So the champions Moscow athletes were honored to represent the country on the international arena in that time, when their guests and rivals in 1935 were Afghan athletes.

=== The Forties (Reforming) ===
During the Great Patriotic War, volleyball continued to be cultivated in the military units. In 1943 volleyball courts in the home front began to revive. Since 1945 the USSR championships were resumed.

=== International level ===
In 1948 the All-Union Volleyball Association became a member of the International Volleyball Federation, and in 1949 USSR players took part in official international competitions for the first time. The Soviet volleyball team made its debut at the European Championship in Prague and immediately won the title of the strongest. after that the Soviet team became the first Olympic champions at the Tokyo Olympics (1964). At the Olympics in Mexico City (1968) and Moscow (1980) it was also victorious. And the women's volleyball team four times (1968, 1972, 1980 and 1988) won the Olympic title.

After the 2022 Russian invasion of Ukraine, the International Volleyball Federation stripped Russia of hosting the men's World Cup in August 2022.

=== National teams honours ===
Soviet volleyball players are 6-times world champions, 12-times European champions, 4-times winners of the World Cup. The USSR women's team won 5 World Championships, 13 European Championships, and one World Cup.

Russian men's team is the winner of World Cup (1999, 2011) and are Olympic Champions 2012 they won World League/FIVB Nations League (2002, 2011, 2013, 2018, 2019). The Women's team won the World Championship (2006, 2010), European Championship (1993, 1997, 1999, 2001, 2013, 2015), "Grand Prix" (1997, 1999, 2002), World Champion's Cup 1997.
