= FIVB Men's Volleyball Club World Championship =

International men's club volleyball competition

- Most recent season or competition: 2025 FIVB Volleyball Men's Club World Championship
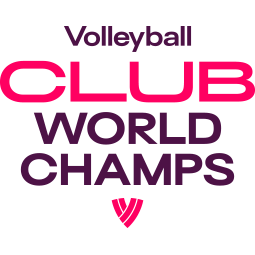
- Official logo
- Sport: Volleyball
- Founded: 1989
- First season: 1989
- No. of teams: 8
- Country: FIVB members
- Continent: International (FIVB)
- Most recent champions: (Italy) Sir Sicoma Monini Perugia (3rd title) (2025)
- Most titles: (Italy) Trentino Itas (5 titles) (Brazil) Sada Cruzeiro (5 titles)
- Streaming partner: Volleyball TV

The FIVB Men's Volleyball Club World Championship is an international men's club volleyball competition organised by the Fédération Internationale de Volleyball (FIVB), the sport's global governing body. The competition was first contested in 1989 in Italy. It was not held between 1993 and 2008, but since 2009, the competition has been held every year, and has been hosted by Qatar, Brazil, Poland and India.

The current champions are Italy's Sir Sicoma Monini Perugia, who defeated Japan's Osaka Bluteon (3–0) in the final of the 2025 edition and won their third world title. Italian teams have been the most successful, with thirteen titles, and in all editions but 2015, at least one Italian team have taken part in the event.

== Results summary ==
Year	Hosts	Final			Third place match			Teams
Year	Hosts	Champions	Score	Runners-up	Third place	Score	Fourth place	Teams
1989; Details	(Italy); Parma	(Italy); Pallavolo Parma	3–0	(Soviet Union); CSKA Moscow	(Brazil); Pirelli Santo André	3–2	(Brazil); Banespa São Paulo	6
1990; Details	(Italy); Milan	(Italy); Gonzaga Milano	3–0	(Brazil); Banespa São Paulo	(Italy); Pallavolo Parma	3–?	(Italy); Porto Ravenna Volley	8
1991; Details	(Brazil); São Paulo	(Italy); Porto Ravenna Volley	3–1	(Brazil); Banespa São Paulo	(Italy); Gonzaga Milano	3–0	(Brazil); Frangosul Novo Hamburgo	8
1992; Details	(Italy); Treviso	(Italy); Gonzaga Milano	3–2	(Italy); Volley Treviso	(Greece); Olympiacos SFP	3–1	(Italy); Porto Ravenna Volley	8
2009; Details	(Qatar); Doha	(Italy); Trentino Volley	3–0	(Poland); Skra Bełchatów	(Russia); Zenit Kazan	3–0	(Iran); Paykan Tehran	8
2010; Details	(Qatar); Doha	(Italy); Trentino Volley	3–1	(Poland); Skra Bełchatów	(Iran); Paykan Tehran	3–2	(Argentina); Ciudad de Bolívar	8
2011; Details	(Qatar); Doha	(Italy); Trentino Volley	3–1	(Poland); Jastrzębski Węgiel	(Russia); Zenit Kazan	3–1	(Brazil); SESI São Paulo	8
2012; Details	(Qatar); Doha	(Italy); Trentino Volley	3–0	(Brazil); Sada Cruzeiro	(Poland); Skra Bełchatów	3–2	(Russia); Zenit Kazan	8
2013; Details	(Brazil); Betim	(Brazil); Sada Cruzeiro	3–0	(Russia); Lokomotiv Novosibirsk	(Italy); Trentino Volley	3–1	(Argentina); UPCN San Juan	8
2014; Details	(Brazil); Belo Horizonte	(Russia); Belogorie Belgorod	3–1	(Qatar); Al Rayyan	(Argentina); UPCN San Juan	3–2	(Brazil); Sada Cruzeiro	8
2015; Details	(Brazil); Betim	(Brazil); Sada Cruzeiro	3–1	(Russia); Zenit Kazan	(Argentina); UPCN San Juan	3–2	(Iran); Paykan Tehran	6
2016; Details	(Brazil); Betim	(Brazil); Sada Cruzeiro	3–0	(Russia); Zenit Kazan	(Italy); Trentino Volley	3–2	(Argentina); Ciudad de Bolívar	8
2017; Details	(Poland); Kraków / Łódź / Opole	(Russia); Zenit Kazan	3–0	(Italy); Lube Civitanova	(Brazil); Sada Cruzeiro	3–0	(Poland); Skra Bełchatów	8
2018; Details	(Poland); Częstochowa / Płock / Rzeszów	(Italy); Trentino Volley	3–1	(Italy); Lube Civitanova	(Russia); Fakel Novy Urengoy	3–1	(Poland); Asseco Resovia	8
2019; Details	(Brazil); Betim	(Italy); Lube Civitanova	3–1	(Brazil); Sada Cruzeiro	(Russia); Zenit Kazan	3–0	(Qatar); Al Rayyan	4
2020	Canceled due to COVID-19 pandemic.							
2021; Details	(Brazil); Betim	(Brazil); Sada Cruzeiro	3–0	(Italy); Lube Civitanova	(Italy); Trentino Volley	3–0	(Brazil); Funvic Natal	6
2022; Details	(Brazil); Betim	(Italy); Sir Safety Perugia	3–1	(Italy); Trentino Volley	(Brazil); Sada Cruzeiro	3–1	(Brazil); Itambé Minas	6
2023; Details	(India); Bangalore	(Italy); Sir Sicoma Perugia	3–0	(Brazil); Itambé Minas	(Japan); Suntory Sunbirds	3–2	(Turkey); Halkbank Spor Kulübü	6
2024; Details	(Brazil); Uberlândia	(Brazil); Sada Cruzeiro	3–1	(Italy); Trentino Itas	(Iran); Foolad Sirjan	3–2	(Italy); Cucine Lube Civitanova	8
2025; Details	(Brazil); Belém	(Italy); Sir Sicoma Monini Perugia	3–0	(Japan); Osaka Bluteon	(Poland); Aluron CMC Warta Zawiercie	3–0	(Brazil); Vôlei Renata Campinas	8
2026; Details	(Poland); Voivodia da Silésia							8

=== Results by confederation ===
Confederation	Titles	Runners-up	Third place	Fourth place
CEV	15	13	12	7
CSV	5	5	5	10
AVC	—	2	3	3
CAVB	—	—	—	—
NORCECA	—	—	—	—
Total	20	20	20	20

As of 21 December 2025

== Format ==
The competition formula of the FIVB Men's Volleyball Club World Championship has been constantly changed to fit the different number of teams that participate in each edition.

In general, the format of the tournament involves eight teams competing for the title at venues within the host nation over a period of about one week; the winners of that year's AVC Club Volleyball Championship (Asia), African Clubs Championship (Africa), South American Volleyball Club Championship (South America) and CEV Champions League (Europe), along with the host city's team and a nominated team from North America. The number of teams is increased through wild card invitees.

Starting from 2024, the qualification for the Club World Championships will be as follows: two places per continent for Europe, Asia, and South America; one place for Africa; and finally, a club from the host nation will be granted a place. This change aims to ensure the fair representation from different continents and provides an opportunity for the host country to participate in the tournament.

Slot(s)	Qualified as
1	Host club
2	CEV Champions League – Winners
2	CEV Champions League – Runners-up
2	CSV Club Championship – Winners
2	CSV Club Championship – Runners-up
2	AVC Champions League – Winners
2	AVC Champions League – Runners-up
1	CAVB Club Championship – Winners
Total: 8

== Prize money ==
The total prize money for the tournament is over USD 350,000.

== Medals summary ==
=== Medal table by club ===
Rank	Club(s)	Gold	Silver	Bronze	Total
1	(Italy) Trentino Itas	5	2	3	10
2	(Brazil) Sada Cruzeiro	5	2	2	9
3	(Italy) Sir Safety Perugia	3	0	0	3
4	(Italy) Gonzaga Milano	2	0	1	3
5	(Italy) Cucine Lube Civitanova	1	3	0	4
6	(Russia) Zenit Kazan	1	2	3	6
7	(Italy) Pallavolo Parma	1	0	1	2
8	(Russia) Belogorie Belgorod	1	0	0	1
8	(Italy) Porto Ravenna Volley	1	0	0	1
10	(Poland) Skra Bełchatów	0	2	1	3
11	(Brazil) Banespa São Paulo	0	2	0	2
12	(Qatar) Al Rayyan	0	1	0	1
12	(Russia) CSKA Moscow (Note: FIVB considers Russia (Since 1993) as the inheritor of the records of Soviet Union (1948-1991) and CIS (1992).)	0	1	0	1
12	(Brazil) Itambé Minas	0	1	0	1
12	(Poland) Jastrzębski Węgiel	0	1	0	1
12	(Russia) Lokomotiv Novosibirsk	0	1	0	1
12	(Japan) Osaka Bluteon	0	1	0	1
12	(Italy) Volley Treviso	0	1	0	1
19	(Argentina) UPCN San Juan	0	0	2	2
20	(Russia) Fakel Novy Urengoy	0	0	1	1
20	(Iran) Foolad Sirjan	0	0	1	1
20	(Greece) Olympiacos SFP	0	0	1	1
20	(Iran) Paykan Tehran	0	0	1	1
20	(Brazil) Pirelli Santo André	0	0	1	1
20	(Japan) Suntory Sunbirds	0	0	1	1
20	(Poland) Warta Zawiercie	0	0	1	1
Totals (26 entries)		20	20	20	60

=== Medal table by country ===
Rank	Nation(s)	Gold	Silver	Bronze	Total
1	Italy	13	6	5	24
2	Brazil	5	5	3	13
3	Russia	2	4	4	10
4	Poland	0	3	2	5
5	Japan	0	1	1	2
6	Qatar	0	1	0	1
7	Argentina	0	0	2	2
7	Iran	0	0	2	2
9	Greece	0	0	1	1
Totals (9 entries)		20	20	20	60

As of 21 December 2025

== Most valuable player by edition ==
- 1989 – no MVP awarded
- 1990 – (Italy) Claudio Galli (Gonzaga Milano)
- 1991 – (United States) Karch Kiraly (Porto Ravenna)
- 1992 – (Italy) Lorenzo Bernardi (Treviso)
- 2009 – (Bulgaria) Matey Kaziyski (Trentino)
- 2010 – (Cuba) Osmany Juantorena (Trentino)
- 2011 – (Cuba) Osmany Juantorena (2) (Trentino)
- 2012 – (Cuba) Osmany Juantorena (3) (Trentino)
- 2013 – (Brazil) Wallace de Souza (Sada Cruzeiro)
- 2014 – (Russia) Dmitry Muserskiy (Belogorie Belgorod)
- 2015 – (Brazil) Yoandy Leal (Sada Cruzeiro)
- 2016 – (Brazil) William Arjona (Sada Cruzeiro)
- 2017 – (Italy) Osmany Juantorena (4) (Lube Civitanova)
- 2018 – (United States) Aaron Russell (Trentino)
- 2019 – (Brazil) Bruno Rezende (Lube Civitanova)
- 2021 – (Cuba) Miguel Ángel López (Sada Cruzeiro)
- 2022 – (Italy) Simone Giannelli (Perugia)
- 2023 – (Ukraine) Oleh Plotnytskyi (Perugia)
- 2024 – (Brazil) Wallace de Souza (2) (Sada Cruzeiro)
- 2025 – (Italy) Simone Giannelli (2) (Perugia)

== See also ==
Men's

- African Clubs Championship
- Asian Men's Club Volleyball Championship
- CEV Champions League
- CEV Challenge Cup
- CEV Cup
- Men's South American Volleyball Club Championship

Women's

- Asian Women's Club Volleyball Championship
- CEV Women's Champions League
- CEV Women's Cup
- CEV Women's Challenge Cup
- FIVB Volleyball Women's Club World Championship
- Women's African Clubs Championship
- Women's South American Volleyball Club Championship
