= Bayer Wuppertal =

Bayer Wuppertal was a German professional volleyball club based in Wuppertal.

== History ==
The club founded in 1952 in Leverkusen as the volleyball part of the multi-sport club SV Bayer 04 Leverkusen (the same as the Bayer 04 Leverkusen football club), and debuted in 1. Bundesliga in 1978. In 1979 it graduated as a Champion in West Germany. In 1989 it won the second national title, also winning the first National Cup; in 1990 it won the last title before the reunification of Germany. In 1992 the club was transferred to Wuppertal. In 1994 as Bayer Wuppertal won the national championship (it was repeated in 1997); obtained his best result in international competitions in 1996, with the Cup Winners' Cup final then lost against Olympiacos. It reached on four occasions the Final Four of the CEV Cup, closing two times in third place (1992, 1997) and two times in fourth place (1993, 1994).

In 2008, after the abandonment of the historic sponsor Bayer, the club was refounded with the name of Wuppertal Titans; still militates in 1. Bundesliga, never having been relegated.

== Achievements ==
- CEV Cup Winners' Cup

Runners-up (1): 1995–96

- CEV Challenge Cup

3rd place (2): 1991–92, 1996–97
4th place (2): 1992–93, 1993–94

- German League

Winners (5): 1978–79, 1988–89, 1989–90, 1993–94, 1996–97

- German Cup

Winners (2): 1987–88, 1994–95
