= Gökhan Öner =

Turkish volleyball player (born 1972)

Gökhan Öner (born 1972 in Mersin) is a Turkish volleyball player. He is 193 cm tall and team captain. He has played for the Arkas Spor Izmir team since the start of the 2007–2008 season and wears 10 number. He played 225 times for the national team. He also played for Arçelik, Halkbank Ankara and Fenerbahçe.

He won the 2008–09 GM Capital Challenge Cup playing with Arkas Spor Izmir and was awarded "Best Spiker" and Best Server".

== Clubs ==
- (Turkey) Arkas Spor Izmir (2008–2009)

== Awards ==
=== Individuals ===
- 2008–09 GM Capital Challenge Cup "Best Spiker"
- 2008–09 GM Capital Challenge Cup "Best Server"

=== Clubs ===
- 2008–09 GM Capital Challenge Cup - Champion, with Arkas Spor Izmir
