= Volley Gonzaga Milano =

Volleyball club in Milan, Italy

Volley Gonzaga Milano or simply Gonzaga Milano was a men's volleyball club from Milan, Italy.

== History ==
The club was founded in 1973 as Volley Gonzaga, following the merger of several clubs, including the Gonzaga Institute team — then Italian junior champions — and CSI Milano, which had competed in Serie A during the 1950s and 1960s. CSI Milano later relocated its headquarters, first to Vigevano and then to Pavia. The team made its debut in the top division during the 1976–77 season, with its final appearance in 1995. In 1987, under the name Ener-Mix Milano (for sponsorship reasons), the team won its first European title - the then-called CEV Cup - defeating Santal Parma in the final.

During the following season (1987–88), the team finished at the bottom of the standings. In the summer of 1988, it was acquired by the Fininvest Group, which aimed to establish a large multi-sport club (Polisportiva Mediolanum), alongside football giants A.C. Milan and teams in ice hockey, basketball, baseball, and rugby. The team was reinstated in Serie A1 following the withdrawal of Pallavolo Mantova. However, the ambitious goals set by management were not realised. After winning the CEV Cup Winners' Cup in 1993, defeating French side Cannes in the final, and losing two championship finals (1992–93 and 1993–94), as well as winning two FIVB Volleyball Men's Club World Championships, Fininvest withdrew in 1995.

The club, facing severe financial difficulties, sold its Serie A1 rights to MTA Padua and was relegated to Serie B2.

In 1999, a new initiative to revive top-level volleyball in Milan was launched with the acquisition of the club - then competing in Serie A2 - by entrepreneur Antonio Caserta, former president of Asystel Volley Novara. Caserta separated the club from the Gonzaga Institute and established Volley Milano.

Meanwhile, in 1998, the Gonzaga Institute re-established its volleyball programme under the name Gonzaga Volleyball Young, focusing primarily on youth development.

== Honours and achievements ==
=== Domestic competitions ===
- Italian League

Runners-up (2): 1992–93, 1993–94

=== European competitions ===
- CEV Cup Winners' Cup

Winners (1): 1992–93
Runners-up (2): 1991–92, 1993–94

- CEV Cup

Winners (1): 1986–87
Runners-up (1): 1983–84

=== Worldwide competitions ===
- FIVB Volleyball Men's Club World Championship

Winners (2): 1990, 1992
