= 1989 FIVB Volleyball Men's Club World Championship =

Volleyball championship

1989 Men's Club World Championship
Tournament details
- Host country: Italy
- Dates: 6–10 December
- Teams: 6 (from 4 confederations)

Final positions
- Champions: (Italy) Maxicono Parma (1st title)

The 1989 FIVB Volleyball Men's Club World Championship was the 1st edition of the event. It was held in Parma, Italy from 9 to 10 December 1989.

== Final standing ==
Rank	Team
1st place, gold medalist(s)	(Italy) Maxicono Parma
2nd place, silver medalist(s)	(Soviet Union) CSKA Moscow
3rd place, bronze medalist(s)	(Brazil) Pirelli Santo André
4	(Brazil) Banespa São Paulo
5	(Japan) Nippon Steel
6	(Tunisia) Sfaxien

1989 Men's Club World Champions
(Italy)
Maxicono Parma
1st title
