= VC Radiotechnik =

Latvian volleyball club

Volleyball Club Radiotechnik (Волейбольный Клуб Радиотехник) is a former Soviet club and after 1991 Latvian, based in Riga. During the seventies it rose to the European limelight thanks to the victory of 3 continental trophies, under the name Elektrotechnika.

== History ==
The debut of the club in the Soviet championship dates back to 1947, but the first notable result is the second place in 1960. From that moment on, the team was one of the strongest players in the Soviet volleyball scene. From 1973 to 1983 it never dropped below the 5th place, and during that decade it was able to establish itself in Europe thanks to the victory of 3 CEV Cup Winners' Cups, two of which back to back. In 1984 the club achieved the maximum milestone in its history: It won the championship title, succeeding in the task of interrupting the streak of 14 consecutive titles of CSKA Moscow.

After the Champion title of the Soviet Union Electrotechnika participated in the CEV European Champions Cup in 1985, where it was eliminated in the quarterfinals by future champions of Santal Parma. After placing third in the 1990 and 1991 editions of the Soviet championship, in 1992 dominated the Latvian newborn championship, created because of the collapse of the Soviet Union. The last great achievement of the club was the winning of the CEV Cup final in 1991 (then the third continental trophy). Also this was the time to defeat by another famous Italian club, Sisley Treviso.

== Names ==
- 1947–60: Daugava
- 1960–62: SKIF Rīga
- 1962–91: Elektrotechnika
- 1991–present: Radiotechnik

== Achievements ==
- CEV Cup Winners' Cup

Winners (3): 1973–74, 1974–75, 1976–77

- CEV Cup

Runners-up (1): 1990–91

- USSR League

Winners (1): 1983–84

- Latvian League

Winners (1): 1992
