= Montpellier Volley =

French volleyball club

Montpellier HSC VB
- Full name: Montpellier Hérault Sport Club Volley-Ball
- Short name: Montpellier Volley
- Founded: 1941
- Ground: Palais des Sports; Chaban Delmas
- Chairman: Pascal Clavé
- Manager: Lorenzo Tubertini
- Captain: Ezequiel Palacios
- League: Ligue A
- 2023–24: 6th
- Website: Club home page

Uniforms
Home	Away

Montpellier HSC VB or simply Montpellier Volley, is a professional men's volleyball club located in the city of Montpellier in southern France. Montpellier competes in the top flight of French volleyball, Ligue A.

The club has won 8 league titles and 1 SuperCup which makes them one of the most successful clubs in French volleyball.

== Honours ==
=== Domestic ===
- French Championship

Winners (9): 1946–47, 1948–49, 1949–50, 1950–51, 1971–72, 1972–73, 1974–75, 2021–22, 2025-26

- French SuperCup

Winners (1): 2022–23

=== International ===
- CEV Cup

Semifinalists (1): 2020–21

== Team ==
As of 2022–23 season

No.	Name	Date of birth	Position
2	(France) Matthieu Vol	26 May 2001 (age 25)	libero
3	(France) Audric Taramini	1 October 2002 (age 24)	middle blocker
4	(Brazil) Leonardo Nascimento	16 March 1995 (age 31)	outside hitter
5	(Brazil) Renan Michelucci	3 January 1994 (age 32)	middle blocker
6	(Canada) Danny Demyanenko	13 July 1994 (age 32)	middle blocker
7	(Brazil) Thiago Veloso	15 August 1993 (age 33)	setter
8	(France) Piele Halagahu	19 March 2001 (age 25)	opposite
9	(Belgium) Marin Dukic	7 June 2000 (age 26)	outside hitter
11	(France) Théo Faure	12 October 1999 (age 26)	opposite
12	(France) Pépin Rajoharivelo	18 January 2004 (age 22)	setter
13	(Argentina) Ezequiel Palacios	2 October 1992 (age 34)	outside hitter
14	(France) Nicolas Le Goff	15 February 1992 (age 34)	middle blocker
18	(Czech Republic) Kamil Baránek	2 May 1983 (age 43)	outside hitter
19	(Argentina) Sebastián Closter	13 May 1989 (age 37)	libero
20	(France) Julien Lecat	14 May 1999 (age 27)	outside hitter
Head coach:		(France) Olivier Lecat	
