= 2007–08 CEV Challenge Cup =

2008–09 CEV Challenge Cup
- League: CEV Challenge Cup
- Sport: Volleyball
- Duration: 29 September 2007 – 23 March 2008

Finals
- Champions: (Italy) Cimone Modena
- Runners-up: (Russia) Lokomotiv Ekaterinburg

CEV Challenge Cup seasons
- ← 2006–07 2008–09 →

The 2007–08 CEV Challenge Cup was the 28th edition of the European Challenge Cup volleyball club tournament, the former CEV Cup.

The Italian club Cimone Modena beat the Russian club Lokomotiv Ekaterinburg in the final and achieved its fifth CEV Challenge Cup trophy.

== Final Four ==
- Venue: Hala Podpromie, (Poland) Rzeszów

Semifinals
22 March
(Italy) Cimone Modena	3
(Poland) Asseco Resovia	2
22 March
(Russia) Lokomotiv Ekaterinburg	3
(France) Stade Poitevin Poitiers	0

Final
23 March
(Italy) Cimone Modena	3
(Russia) Lokomotiv Ekaterinburg	1
3rd place match
23 March
(Poland) Asseco Resovia	0
(France) Stade Poitevin Poitiers	3

=== Semi finals ===
Date	Time		Score		Set 1	Set 2	Set 3	Set 4	Set 5	Total	Report
21 Mar	16:00	Cimone Modena (Italy)	3–2	(Poland) Asseco Resovia	17–25	23–25	25–20	25–18	15–11	105–99	Report
21 Mar	18:30	Lokomotiv Ekaterinburg (Russia)	3–0	(France) Stade Poitevin Poitiers	25–23	25–19	25–21			75–63	Report

=== 3rd place ===
Date	Time		Score		Set 1	Set 2	Set 3	Set 4	Set 5	Total	Report
22 Mar	14:00	Asseco Resovia (Poland)	0–3	(France) Stade Poitevin Poitiers	25–27	21–25	36–38			82–90	Report

=== Final ===
Date	Time		Score		Set 1	Set 2	Set 3	Set 4	Set 5	Total	Report
22 Mar	17:00	Cimone Modena (Italy)	3–1	(Russia) Lokomotiv Ekaterinburg	23–25	25–18	25–16	25–19		98–78	Report

== Final standing ==
Rank	Team
1st place, gold medalist(s)	(Italy) Cimone Modena
2nd place, silver medalist(s)	(Russia) Lokomotiv Ekaterinburg
3rd place, bronze medalist(s)	(France) Stade Poitevin Poitiers
4	(Poland) Asseco Resovia

== Awards ==
- Most valuable player

(Brazil) André Nascimento (Cimone Modena)

- Best scorer

(Brazil) André Nascimento (Cimone Modena)

- Best Opposite

(Poland) Paweł Papke (Asseco Resovia)

- Best blocker

(Brazil) André Heller (Cimone Modena)

- Best receiver

(Spain) José Luis Lobato (Stade Poitevin Poitiers)

- Best setter

(Russia) Denis Ignatyev (Lokomotiv Ekaterinburg)

- Best server

(Cuba) Ángel Dennis (Cimone Modena)
