= AMSL Fréjus Volleyball =

French volleyball club

AMSL Fréjus Volleyball (Association municipale des sports et loisirs de Fréjus volley-ball) is a French volleyball club, section of the AMSL Fréjus multi-sports club, which now plays in the fourth division, but in its history has several national titles.

== History ==
The club was founded in 1974, with the full name of the Municipal Association of Sports et Loisir de Fréjus. It climbed the French championships up to the top flight, and in 1986 won its first trophy, the French Cup. The formation dominated the national scene in the late eighties, winning three consecutive championships. With the title of Champion of France it participated in several editions of the European Cups. The best result in the maximum continental trophy is dated in 1989-90, when Fréjus reached the final and was defeated 2-3 by the Italian powerhouse Philips Modena.

In 1992, despite the victory of the third coupled league-cup, it suffered a heavy financial difficulties that the team dropped back in the lower leagues, where he still plays today.

== Honours ==
French League

- Winners (4): 1986-87, 1987–88, 1988–89, 1991-92

French Cup

- Winners (5): 1985-86, 1986–87, 1988–89, 1990–91, 1991–92

CEV Champions League

- Runners-up (1): 1989-90
