= 1991 FIVB Volleyball Men's Club World Championship =

1991 Men's Club World Championship
Tournament details
- Host country: Brazil
- Dates: 22–27 October
- Teams: 8 (from 5 confederations)

Final positions
- Champions: (Italy) il Messaggero Ravenna (1st title)

Tournament awards
- MVP: (United States) Karch Kiraly (RAV)

The 1991 FIVB Volleyball Men's Club World Championship was the 3rd edition of the event. It was held in São Paulo, Brazil from 22 to 27 October 1991.

== Final standing ==
Rank	Team
1st place, gold medalist(s)	(Italy) il Messaggero Ravenna
2nd place, silver medalist(s)	(Brazil) Banespa São Paulo
3rd place, bronze medalist(s)	(Italy) Mediolanum Milano
4	(Brazil) Frangosul
5	(Chinese Taipei) Taiwan
6	(Soviet Union) CSKA Moscow
7	(Tunisia) Club Africain
8	(Puerto Rico) Changos de Naranjito

1991 Men's Club World Champions
(Italy)
il Messaggero Ravenna
1st title

== Awards ==
- Most Valuable Player

(United States) Karch Kiraly (il Messaggero Ravenna)
