= VC Dynamo Luhansk =

Former men's volleyball club in Luhansk

Volleyball club Dynamo Luhansk is a former Soviet and Ukrainian men's volleyball club from Luhansk. It was founded in 1965 and until 1982 it was called Zvezda Voroshilovgrad. The club became multiple prize-winner of the USSR and Ukraine championships, and also winner of the CEV Cup Winners' Cup in 1973.

== History ==
The club "Zvezda" was established in Voroshilovgrad in 1965.

== Achievements ==
- CEV Cup Winners' Cup

Winners (1): 1972–73
Runners-up (1): 1973–74

- USSR League

Runners-up (1): 1976, 1978–79

== Sources ==
- Edelman, A. S., ed. (1984). Волейбол. Справочник [Volleyball: A Handbook] (in Russian). Moscpw: Физкультура и спорт.
