= Zinella Volley =

Volleyball club in Italy

Zinella Volley is an Italian volleyball club based in Bologna.

== History ==
Was founded in 1972 as the volleyball section of the multi-sports club Unione Sportiva Zinella, the yellow-black company reached for the first time the Italian Championship Series A1 men's volleyball at the end of the A2 league 1981–82, which ended unbeaten.

The new promotion marked the brightest moment of the history of the club, that with Nerio Zanetti coach in 1984 he won his first Italian Cup, beating Panini Modena in the final of Turin. The following season, 1984–85, the Emilian club, sponsored by Mapier, won the Serie A1 overcoming Panini Modena in the play-offs final. The following year gialloneri fell in the final in front of fellow; in 1987 came the first international trophy, the CEV Cup Winner's Cup, won in Basel against Levski-Spartak from Sofia. The parable of the team, however, began to close; in 1990–91, after the merger with the other Bolognese volleyball team, the Pencus, the club fell to A-2.

In 1991–92, sponsored by Fochi, the club returned to the A-1, a category in which he served for five seasons before merging in 4Torri of Ferrara and be born the following year, as Zinella Volley.

In the 2007–08 season Zinella played in Serie B1; It is recently a sports partnership agreement with the basketball team Virtus Bologna, with which it shares the current sponsors La Fortezza. Recently, after the defeat in the final of the promotion play-off against Cibes La Nef Castelfidardo, Zinella has forwarded successfully repechage question in Serie A2 in place of renunciataria Stilcasa Taviano.

In 2010 the company has waived enrollment in A2.

== Honours & achievements ==
=== Domestic competitions ===
Italian League

- Winners (1): 1984-85
- Runners-up (1): 1985-86

Italian Cup

- Winners (1): 1983-84

=== European competitions ===
CEV Cup Winner's Cup

- Winners (1): 1986-87
- Runners-up (1): 1987-88
