= Porto Ravenna Volley =

Historical volleyball club in Ravenna, Emilia-Romagna, Italy

- Short name: Ravenna Volley
- Founded: 1987
- Dissolved: 2013
- Ground: Pala De André, Ravenna, Italy
- League: Italian Volleyball League
- Website: Club home page

Porto Ravenna Volley was a historical volleyball club from the city of Ravenna in Emilia-Romagna. Ravenna founded by a group of businessmen and lovers inspired by Giuseppe Brusi, it landed in A1 at the end of the eighties, continuing a tradition that makes the city one of the "cradles" of Italian volleyball.

== Achievements ==
- CEV Champions League

Winners (3): 1992, 1993, 1994
Runners-up (1): 1995

- CEV Challenge Cup

Winners (1): 1997
Runners-up (1): 1996

- CEV SuperCup

Winners (2): 1992, 1993
Runners-up (1): 1994

- FIVB Club World Championship

Winners (1): 1991

- Italian League

Winners (1): 1991

- Italian Cup

Winners (1): 1991

== History ==
The tradition dates back to other male volleyball club from Ravenna, where the G.S. Robur, won five league titles at the turn of the forties and fifties, and Casadio, who was born on the initiative of the Fire Department, and he served in A1 and A2 from the sixties then. In 1987 Giuseppe Brusi and a consortium of local businessmen took over the Casadio and the right to participate in the Series A2 and changed its name to Porto Ravenna Volley. In the nineties, with the sponsorship of the Ferruzzi Group, the team took the name "il Messaggero" Volley, and won a league title, an Italian Cup (1991), three consecutive European Champion Cups (1992, 1993 and 1994), two European Super Cups and the Club World Championship.

In the 1990–91 season, coached by Daniele Ricci, the team (with notable players Vullo, Timmons, Kiraly, Margaret, Gardini, Masciarelli) won the league and the Italian Cup.

Among the players who have played for the team are the Brazilians Renan Dal Zotto and Giovane Gávio, the Russian Dmitry Fomin, and the Italians Vigor Bovolenta and Andrea Sartoretti.

Porto Ravenna Volley also boasts success in the field of youth. From 1990 to 2000 the club won four times the Junior League, three league titles Under-18, Under-16 two league titles, one Scudetto under 14 and a Boy League. The youth activities (which over the years Il Messaggero was coordinated by the Polish Olympic champion Alexander Skiba) led to the formation of the players who dressed the national team and that still tread the fields of Serie A. The Italian Under-16 title won on June 4, 2000 with victory in the final against Sisley Treviso, remains to this day the last championship of volleyball Ravenna.

With the financial crisis of the industrial group Ferruzzi-Montedison and the death of the entrepreneur Raul Gardini in July 1993, the sports club gradually lost subsidies needed and went to meet a decline or loss; it continued its work (summarizing the name Porto Ravenna Volley), winning one more European title in 1997, the CEV Cup combined with several sponsors that allowed her to continue trading in Serie A until 2000. In that 'year, due to financial problems, the rights to participation in the championship of A1 were transferred to Trento.

The activities of Porto Ravenna Volley continued at youth level, and in the 2009–2010 season, with the presidency of Vanni Monari came the return to a national championship: stravincendo the series C, was achieved promotion to Serie B2. The following season, immediately gets the promotion to Serie B1. In the 2012–13 season, after reaching the play-off promotion to Serie A2. At the end of the season now it merges with Gruppo Sportivo Robur Angelo Costa, going to create the Gruppo Sportivo Porto Robur Costa.
