= AS Cannes Volley-Ball =

French volleyball club

- Short name: AS Cannes
- Founded: 1942
- Ground: Palais des Victoires (Capacity: 4,000)
- Manager: Roberto Serniotti
- League: Ligue B
- 2022–23: 4th
- Website: Club home page

Uniforms
Home	Away

AS Cannes is a professional men's volleyball club based in Cannes, France. They were relegated to Ligue B, the second-tier competition in French volleyball after the 2021–22 season.

== Honours ==
=== Domestic ===
- French Championship

Winners (10): 1980–81, 1981–82, 1982–83, 1985–86, 1989–90, 1990–91, 1993–94, 1994–95, 2004–05, 2020–21

- French Cup

Winners (5): 1984–85, 1992–93, 1994–95, 1997–98, 2006–07

=== International ===
- CEV European Champions Cup

Silver (1): 1982–83

- CEV Cup

Winners (1): 1998–99
Silver (1): 1992–93

- CEV Challenge Cup

Winners (1): 1980–81
