= VC Avtomobilist Saint Petersburg =

Russian volleyball club

Avtomobilist Saint Petersburg
- Full name: Volleyball Club "Avtomobilist"
- Short name: VC Avtomobilist SPb
- Founded: 1935
- Ground: Platonov Volleyball Academy, Saint Petersburg (Capacity: 1,500)
- Chairman: Boris Koptin
- Manager: Yevgeny Lebedev
- League: Russian Volleyball High League A
- 2018-19: 7

VC Avtomobilist Saint Petersburg (Волейбольный Клуб Автомобилист Санкт-Петербург) is a Russian men's volleyball club. It was founded in 1935. The club was a three-time champion of the Soviet Union, twice champion of Russia, and four-time winner of the European cup. In January 2016, the club stopped participating in the national championships, and was eliminated to the Second League.

== History ==
=== Pre-war period ===
The history of the club dates back to 1935, when the initiative of Anatoly Dmitriev at the Leningrad branch of the Spartak society volleyball team was created. The summer of 1935, the club, along with Spartak teams from Moscow, Kharkiv, and Dnipropetrovsk participated in the first championship of the Central Council of the Spartacus League in volleyball, and losing just one game, it was the winner. In 1935–1936 years of volleyball players of Spartacus in the national team of Leningrad conquered silver medals volleyball All-Union festivals, and in 1937 became the winners of the tournament between the teams of Leningrad, Kiev, and Dnepropetrovsk.

August 30, 1938 ended the fifth and first among club teams championship of the USSR. Peter Areshev, Michael Balazovsky, Aleksey Baryshnikov, Ilya Filanovskii, Alexander Shcherbin, Anatoly Einhorn, and Victor Yashkevich under the leadership of Anatoly Dmitriev (and according to other sources, player-coach Baryshnikov) excelled in the final tournament of six teams, was held at the tennis stadium CDKA. A year later, in the same part of the Leningrad "Spartacus" won Odessa final match of the championship of the USSR in Moscow team-mates, with the match turned out to be so uncompromising that lasted until darkness was interrupted and postponed to the following day. In 1940 in Tbilisi Spartak Moscow took revenge, leaving Leningrad with silver medals.

=== Post-war period ===
In the postwar years, Spartacus was not able to climb the podium - in the team there were only two volleyball wins in the championships of the USSR. Michael Balazovsky Shcherbin and Alexander did not return from the war. Ilya G. Filanovskii went into science, defended his thesis, he worked at the law faculty of Leningrad State University. Best in the country blocking Anatoly Einhorn began to play for the team of the Leningrad House of Officers (DOs), in 1949 in the USSR team won the first ever World Championship volleyball. One of the players, and then to the coach was also Alexey Baryshnikov.

The name of Alexey G. Baryshnikov in 1950 linked the return of victorious traditions of Spartacus. In 1956, he led the Leningrad team won the third place at the Games of the peoples of the USSR, and in 1957 a new generation of Leningrad Spartak won gold medals in the national championship. This victory was not easy, Spartacus and CSK MO had at the end of the championship the same number of points and had to play an extra match. Young Spartacus pulled out a victory with a score of 3: 2. In 1958, Spartak won the bronze medal, and in 1959 formed the basis for the national team of the city, which is under the direction of Nikolai Mikheyev in the final of the Games of the peoples of the USSR in three games beat Moscow team. Besides Spartak became the winner of the Games of the 20-year-old Vyacheslav Platonov, who was at that time the player commands an army of the city on the Neva.

Spartak players Vladimir Andreev, Yuri Aroshidze, Vladimir Astafjevs, Gennady Gaikova, and Marat Shablygin joined the national team. However, Yuri Aroshidze, the 1960 world champion, has become famous not only on the volleyball court - over the past two decades, he worked as chief engineer of the association Electrosila. Not less progress in science has achieved and Marat Vasilyevich Shablygin - not only multiple winner and prize-winner of the USSR championships and international competitions, but also the doctor of chemical sciences, professor.

=== Hell drivers ===
A new stage in the development of Spartak volleyball began in 1967, when the game coach, speaking while in the second tier of the Soviet volleyball, group II of Class A, became Vyacheslav Platonov. In 1969 Spartak, I returned to the group, later called the premier league, and in 1970 the club changed its name to "Motorist" and took 4th place. At the end of 1970 Platonov left the area, handing his shirt with the number "8" 18-year-old Vyacheslav Zaitsev, and became the senior coach of the team.

From 1972 to 1990, Avtomobilist won 8 silver and 8 bronze medals of the USSR championships, scored four wins in European competition. The highest level of the union of the podium and the team is not subjected to - select the "gold" at CSKA, the club is the base of the national team. And since 1977, when Platonov after two years of working in Kuwait ("Motorist" in those years, coached Anatoly F. Fedotov) he led the team of the USSR. Ostrokombinatsionny, risky, fast volleyball, for which the Avtomobilist nicknamed "Hell Drivers" does not always lead to success - for coach experimentation team on the recognition of Vyacheslav Alekseevich, was paying shortfalls points in the championship.

Nevertheless, throughout the 1970s and 1980s, the Leningrad team grew a whole constellation of artists, three of them - Vyacheslav Zaitsev, Vladimir Dorokhov Alexander Ermilov - became champions of the Olympic Games in Moscow 1980; Yuri Cherednik - the silver medal of the Games in Seoul 1988.

In 1989, Platonov was leaving to work in Finland head coach Avtomobilist's become his long-term partner Zinovy E. Black. They were the first in the Soviet Union self-supporting club was formed - volleyball center "Motorist". Under the leadership of the Black team won the Russian championships in 1992 and 1993. on 20 December 1994 a talented coach heart stopped in the hall Odintsovo "Sparks" in a few minutes after the game with "Samotlor".

=== The fall ===
On the coaching bridge club returns Vyacheslav Platonov. Avtomobilist, like many other Russian clubs, going through the departure of top volleyball players abroad and difficult financial situation. Team after 1995 did not show good results, but by the end of the championship of Russia-1997/98, in which she acted without foreign clubs to send Ruslan Zhbankova and Michael Chupris, a year has left the strongest Division Super League "A". Under these conditions, Platonov was forced to make a bet on the young players work for the future. In severe for the team in 1998 in the first team, "Motorist" first came to the site 17-year-old Semyon Poltava, on the turn of the century in St. Petersburg opened the talent of Maxim Proskurnya, Alexander Bogomolov, Denis Ignatyev.

In the summer of 2002, when the team had already called at the time "Baltika", deprived of their leaders (Maxim Proskurnya moved to the "Dinamo", and Simon Poltava - in Italian Montichiari), it became very difficult. "Baltika" finished the championship in 10th place. And in 2005, when the company "Baltika" for beer advertising ban has refused to finance the club, the team again became the "Spartacus" dropped out of the Super League. On the night of December 26, 2005 died Platonov. Shortly before the death of Platonov in St. Petersburg opened its Volleyball Academy.

In the season-2005/06 Spartak finished last in the "A" and "transit" Majors followed in the third tier of the Russian championship. Championship league teams "B" -2006/07 "Spartacus" led by Andrei Vladimirovich Talochka completed on the 5th, and the next - the 7th place in the European zone. In November 2007, the team happened extraordinary event: in it after 13 years in the Italian championship and two good seasons in Novokuibyshevsk NOVE, returned one of the favorite students of Vyacheslav Platonov - the silver medalist of the Olympic Games in Seoul, 41-year-old Yuri Cherednikβ. Last time as part of hometown club, he went to the site March 2, 2008 in a match against SKA Rostov-SRSUES.

=== Recent history ===
In autumn 2008, Spartak was again renamed the "Avtomobilist". Under the direction of the coach Sergei Vladimirovich Poberezhchenko in the season-2008/09 team won the European zone of Ukraine Major League "B", and excelled in the final tournament, winning thereby a ticket to the big leagues, "A".

In 2009 the coaching bridge "Avtomobilist" returned Andrew Shcheglov. In the season-2009/10 St. Petersburg team was one of the discoveries of the "A" Major League, finishing 4th place; and championship-2010/11 early finished in second place, winning the right to return to Super League, in spite of the unstable financial situation, without the involvement of a group of experienced players, but at the expense of teamwork composition which is based on their own pupils the club.

In summer 2011, the team went from 7 volleyball players, three of them stepped up the Super League clubs: Denis diagonal Zemchёnok and libero Artem Zelenkov become players Krasnodar "Dynamo", and doigrovschik Dmitry Leontiev moved to "Gazprom-Ugra". Due to financial problems, only less than a month before the start of the championship of Russia-2011/12 guide "Motorist" confirmed that the team will take part in it.

At the end of the season-2011/12 team, won the championship only 4 wins, 22 defeats, could not maintain residence in the Super League. In the offseason, head coach Andrei Shcheglov was invited to the "Gazprom-Ugra" with him in Surgut moved binder Sergei Shulga, diagonal Vladimir Parhuta and libero Viktor Belov. On September 14, 2012, at the decision of the Executive Committee of the All-Russian Volleyball Federation, Avtomobilist was transferred to the big leagues, "B". Before the start of the third tier of the Russian championship team led the work in the system "Yaroslavich" and Kazan "Zenith" Tatiana Obraztsova.

Before the season-2013/14 club president Boris Koptin, known for his work in the Committee for External Relations of St. Petersburg, a former long-term head of the "Motorist" Vladimir Samsonov took the position of vice-president. On the post of chief coach of the team is back Andrew Shcheglov, its composition strengthened experienced volleyball players, among them Vladimir Sukharev, Alex Luster, the champion of Russia in 1999 Sergei Samsonov and alumnus of the St. Petersburg club Andrei Nyrtsov. "Motorist" won 3rd place in the preliminary group stage, 2nd - in the semifinals of the "West" zone, 3rd in the final Major League "B" and became a member of the transitional tournament "Will Castle", the results of which, together with Chelyabinsk "Torpedo" won a ticket to the big leagues, "A". At the end of the season Talochka moved to the coaching staff, Leningradka and mentor "Motorist" was his former assistant Evgeny Lebedev.

In the season-2014/15 St. Petersburg took 9th place in the major league championship "A". In September 2015, Diagonal "Motorist" Sergei Piraino in the youth team of Russia won the gold medal at the World Championship in Mexico. In the course of the season-2015/16 "Motorist" I missed four matches "A" Major League, having failed to find the funds for trips to Grozny and Georgievsk, so that the decision of the Executive Committee of All-Russian Volleyball Federation on January 29, 2016 the team was eliminated from the tournament.

Since 2017 the club is playing in the First League A, the second league in the Russian Volleyball. Since the establishment of VC Zenit, Avtomobilist serve as their reserve team.
