= CEV Cup =

Second-tier volleyball competition for European men's clubs

- Most recent season or competition: 2025–26 CEV Cup
- Formerly: CEV Cup Winners' Cup (1972–2000); CEV Top Teams Cup (2000–2007)
- Sport: Volleyball
- Founded: 1972; 54 years ago
- Administrator: CEV
- No. of teams: 32 (Main phase)
- Country: CEV members
- Continent: Europe
- Most recent champions: (Italy) Gas Sales Piacenza (1st title)
- Most titles: (Italy) Modena Volley (Russia) Dynamo Moscow (4 titles each)
- Website: Official website

The CEV Cup is the second tier official competition for men's Volleyball clubs of Europe. The competition takes place every year.

Until 2000, it was the CEV Cup Winners' Cup. In 2000 it was renamed to CEV Top Teams Cup and in 2007 to CEV Cup. The former CEV Cup was renamed to CEV Challenge Cup.

== History ==
- CEV Cup Winners' Cup (1972–73 to 1999–2000)
- CEV Top Teams Cup (2000–01 to 2006–2007)
- CEV Cup (2007–08 to present)

== Title holders ==
- 1972–73: (Soviet Union) Zvezda Voroshilovgrad
- 1973–74: (Soviet Union) Elektrotechnika Riga
- 1974–75: (Soviet Union) Elektrotechnika Riga
- 1975–76: (Bulgaria) CSKA Sofia
- 1976–77: (Soviet Union) Elektrotechnika Riga
- 1977–78: (Czechoslovakia) Rudá Hvězda Praha
- 1978–79: (Romania) Dinamo București
- 1979–80: (Italy) Modena Volley
- 1980–81: (Czechoslovakia) Červená Hvězda Bratislava
- 1981–82: (Soviet Union) Avtomobilist Leningrad
- 1982–83: (Soviet Union) Avtomobilist Leningrad
- 1983–84: (Italy) Pallavolo Torino
- 1984–85: (Soviet Union) Dynamo Moscow
- 1985–86: (Italy) Modena Volley
- 1986–87: (Italy) Zinella Volley
- 1987–88: (Italy) Pallavolo Parma
- 1988–89: (Italy) Pallavolo Parma
- 1989–90: (Italy) Pallavolo Parma
- 1990–91: (Italy) Gabeca Pallavolo
- 1991–92: (Italy) Gabeca Pallavolo
- 1992–93: (Italy) Volley Gonzaga Milano
- 1993–94: (Italy) Volley Treviso
- 1994–95: (Italy) Modena Volley
- 1995–96: (Greece) Olympiacos
- 1996–97: (Italy) Piemonte Volley
- 1997–98: (Italy) Piemonte Volley
- 1998–99: (France) AS Cannes
- 1999–00: (France) Paris Volley
- 2000–01: (Portugal) SC Espinho
- 2001–02: (Belgium) Knack Roeselare
- 2002–03: (Netherlands) Dynamo Apeldoorn
- 2003–04: (Ukraine) Lokomotiv Kharkiv
- 2004–05: (Greece) Olympiacos
- 2005–06: (Italy) Volley Piacenza
- 2006–07: (Slovenia) ACH Volley
- 2007–08: (Italy) Roma Volley
- 2008–09: (Russia) Lokomotiv Belgorod
- 2009–10: (Italy) Piemonte Volley
- 2010–11: (Italy) Volley Treviso
- 2011–12: (Russia) Dynamo Moscow
- 2012–13: (Turkey) Halkbank Ankara
- 2013–14: (France) Paris Volley
- 2014–15: (Russia) Dynamo Moscow
- 2015–16: (Germany) Berlin Recycling Volleys
- 2016–17: (France) Tours VB
- 2017–18: (Russia) Belogorie Belgorod
- 2018–19: (Italy) Trentino Volley
- 2020–21: (Russia) Dynamo Moscow
- 2021–22: (Italy) Volley Milano
- 2022–23: (Italy) Modena Volley
- 2023–24: (Poland) Resovia
- 2024–25: (Turkey) Ziraat Bank Ankara
- 2025–26: (Italy) Gas Sales Piacenza

== CEV Cup Winners' Cup ==
Year	Final			Third place match	
Year	Champion	Score	Second place	Third place	Fourth place
1972–73; Details	(Soviet Union); Zvezda Voroshilovgrad	Group Stage	(Hungary); Csepel Budapest	(Bulgaria); Levski Spartak Sofia	(Italy); Ruini Firenze
1973–74; Details	(Soviet Union); Elektrotechnika Riga	Group Stage	(Soviet Union); Zvezda Voroshilovgrad	(Poland); Resovia	(Italy); Lubiam Bologna
1974–75; Details	(Soviet Union); Elektrotechnika Riga	Group Stage	(Bulgaria); Levski Spartak Sofia	(Czechoslovakia); Aero Odolena Voda	(Hungary); Újpesti
1975–76; Details	(Bulgaria); CSKA Sofia	Group Stage	(Czechoslovakia); Červená Hvězda Bratislava	(Italy); Klippan Torino	(Netherlands); Bouwlust Orawi
1976–77; Details	(Soviet Union); Elektrotechnika Riga	Group Stage	(Romania); Steaua București	(Czechoslovakia); Aero Odolena Voda	(Hungary); Budapest Honvéd
1977–78; Details	(Czechoslovakia); Rudá Hvězda Praha	Group Stage	(Poland); AZS Olsztyn	(Italy); Paoletti Catania	(Turkey); Eczacıbaşı İstanbul
1978–79; Details	(Romania); Dinamo București	Group Stage	(Bulgaria); Levski Spartak Sofia	(Czechoslovakia); Rudá Hvězda Praha	(Netherlands); Gemeenteservice Vught
1979–80; Details	(Italy); Panini Modena	Group Stage	(Greece); Panathinaikos	(Czechoslovakia); Aero Odolena Voda	(Turkey); Vinylex İstanbul
1980–81; Details	(Czechoslovakia); Červená Hvězda Bratislava	Group Stage	(Romania); Steaua București	(Soviet Union); Avtomobilist Leningrad	(Bulgaria); CSKA Sofia
1981–82; Details	(Soviet Union); Avtomobilist Leningrad	Group Stage	(Bulgaria); Levski Spartak Sofia	(Romania); Steaua București	(France); AS Grenobloise
1982–83; Details	(Soviet Union); Avtomobilist Leningrad	Group Stage	(Italy); Robe di Kappa Torino	(Socialist Federal Republic of Yugoslavia); Vojvodina Novi Sad	(Turkey); Güney Sanayi Adana
1983–84; Details	(Italy); Robe di Kappa Torino	Group Stage	(Spain); Son Amar Palma de Mallorca	(France); Asnières Sports	(Netherlands); Brother Martinus Amstelveen
1984–85; Details	(Soviet Union); Dynamo Moscow	Group Stage	(Bulgaria); Levski Spartak Sofia	(Romania); Steaua București	(West Germany); Hamburger SV
1985–86; Details	(Italy); Panini Modena	Group Stage	(Romania); Steaua București	(Bulgaria); CSKA Sofia	(Soviet Union); Dynamo Moscow
1986–87; Details	(Italy); Tartarini Bologna	Group Stage	(Bulgaria); Levski Sofia	(Socialist Federal Republic of Yugoslavia); Bosna Sarajevo	(Poland); Resovia
1987–88; Details	(Italy); Maxicono Parma	3–0	(Italy); Tartarini Bologna	(Bulgaria); Levski Sofia	(Czechoslovakia); Rudá Hvězda Praha
1988–89; Details	(Italy); Maxicono Parma	3–0	(Bulgaria); Levski Sofia	(Greece); Panathinaikos	(Italy); Camst Bologna
1989–90; Details	(Italy); Maxicono Parma	3–1	(Italy); Sisley Treviso	(Soviet Union); Dynamo Moscow	(West Germany); Hamburger SV
1990–91; Details	(Italy); Eurostile Montichari	3–1	(Soviet Union); Avtomobilist Leningrad	(France); Fréjus VB	(Belgium); Knack Roeselare
1991–92; Details	(Italy); Eurostile Montichari	3–2	(Italy); Mediolanum Milano	(Germany); Moerser SC	(Belgium); Desimpel Torhout
1992–93; Details	(Italy); Mediolanum Milano	3–1	(France); AS Cannes	(Italy); Gabeca Montichiari	(Greece); Aris Thessaloniki
1993–94; Details	(Italy); Sisley Treviso	3–2	(Italy); Mediolanum Milano	(France); AS Cannes	(Greece); AS Orestiada
1994–95; Details	(Italy); Daytona Las Modena	3–0	(Spain); Numancia Soria	(Belgium); Knack Roeselare	(Greece); Aris Thessaloniki
1995–96; Details	(Greece); Olympiacos	3–2	(Germany); Bayer Wuppertal	(Netherlands); Alcom Capelle	(Spain); Unicaja Almería
1996–97; Details	(Italy); Alpitour Traco Cuneo	3–0	(Greece); Olympiacos	(Russia); Belogorie Belgorod	(Germany); SCC Berlin
1997–98; Details	(Italy); Alpitour Traco Cuneo	3–0	(Greece); Olympiacos	(Portugal); Castêlo da Maia GC	(Spain); CS Gran Canaria
1998–99; Details	(France); AS Cannes	3–2	(Italy); Alpitour Traco Cuneo	(Russia); Lokomotiv Izumrud Ekaterinburg	(Turkey); Arçelik İstanbul
1999–00; Details	(France); Paris Volley	3–1	(Italy); Alpitour Traco Cuneo	(Greece); AEK Athens	(Turkey); Galatasaray

== CEV Top Teams Cup ==
Year	Final			Third place match	
Year	Champion	Score	Second place	Third place	Fourth place
2000–01; Details	(Portugal); SC Espinho	3–2	(Russia); Izumrud Ekaterinburg	(Spain); Unicaja Almería	(Turkey); Erdemirspor Ereğli
2001–02; Details	(Belgium); Knack Roeselare	3–1	(Portugal); SC Espinho	(Poland); Domex Tytan AZS Częstochowa	(Ukraine); Lokomotiv Kharkiv
2002–03; Details	(Netherlands); Piet Zoomers Apeldoorn	3–1	(Ukraine); Lokomotiv Kharkiv	(Netherlands); Omniworld Almere	(Ukraine); Azot Cherkasy
2003–04; Details	(Ukraine); Lokomotiv Kharkiv	3–1	(Romania); Deltacons Tulcea	(Austria); Tiroler Wasserkraft Innsbruck	(Portugal); Castêlo da Maia GC
2004–05; Details	(Greece); Olympiacos	3–0	(Netherlands); Ortec Nesselande	(Czech Republic); Dukla Liberec	(Netherlands); Omniworld Almere
2005–06; Details	(Italy); Copra Berni Piacenza	3–2	(Spain); Pòrtol Son Amar Palma	(Greece); Panathinaikos	(Serbia); Vojvodina Novi Sad
2006–07; Details	(Slovenia); Autocommerce Bled	3–2	(Italy); Cimone Modena	(Russia); Iskra Odintsovo	(North Macedonia); Rabotnički Fersped Skopje

== CEV Cup ==
Year	Final			Third place match	
Year	Champion	Score	Second place	Third place	Fourth place
2007–08; Details	(Italy); Roma Volley	3–0	(Belgium); Noliko Maaseik	(Montenegro); Budvanska Rivijera Budva	(Russia); Fakel Novy Urengoy
2008–09; Details	(Russia); Lokomotiv Belgorod	3–1	(Greece); Panathinaikos	(Italy); Bre Banca Lannutti Cuneo	(Spain); Unicaja Almería
2009–10; Details	(Italy); Bre Banca Lannutti Cuneo	3–1	(Russia); Iskra Odintsovo	(Belgium); Noliko Maaseik	(Italy); Copra Nord Meccanica Piacenza
2010–11; Details	(Italy); Sisley Treviso	2–3, 3–1 (GS 15–11)	(Poland); ZAKSA Kędzierzyn-Koźle		
2011–12; Details	(Russia); Dynamo Moscow	3–2, 3–2	(Poland); Asseco Resovia		
2012–13; Details	(Turkey); Halkbank Ankara	3–1, 3–2	(Italy); Andreoli Latina		
2013–14; Details	(France); Paris Volley	0–3, 3–1 (GS 15–11)	(Russia); Guberniya Nizhny Novgorod		
2014–15; Details	(Russia); Dynamo Moscow	3–1, 1–3 (GS 15–12)	(Italy); Energy T.I. Diatec Trentino		
2015–16; Details	(Germany); Berlin Recycling Volleys	3–2, 3–0	(Russia); Gazprom-Ugra Surgut		
2016–17; Details	(France); Tours VB	0–3, 3–1 (GS 15–13)	(Italy); Diatec Trentino		
2017–18; Details	(Russia); Belogorie Belgorod	3–0, 3–2	(Turkey); Ziraat Bankası Ankara		
2018–19; Details	(Italy); Diatec Trentino	3–0, 3–2	(Turkey); Galatasaray		
2019–20; Details	Cancelled				
2020–21; Details	(Russia); Dynamo Moscow	3–2, 3–1	(Russia); Zenit Saint Petersburg		
2021–22; Details	(Italy); Vero Volley Monza	3–0, 3–0	(France); Tours VB		
2022–23; Details	(Italy); Valsa Group Modena	0–3, 3–0 (GS 15–9)	(Belgium); Knack Roeselare		
2023–24; Details	(Poland); Asseco Resovia	3–0, 3–0	(Germany); SVG Lüneburg		
2024–25; Details	(Turkey); Ziraat Bank Ankara	3–2, 3–1	(Poland); Asseco Resovia		
2025–26; Details	(Italy); Gas Sales Piacenza	3–0, 3–0	(Germany); SVG Lüneburg		

== Titles by club ==
Rank	Club	Titles	Runner–up	Champion years
1.	(Italy) Modena Volley	4	1	1980, 1986, 1995, 2023
2.	(Russian Soviet Federative Socialist Republic) (Russia) Dynamo Moscow	4		1985, 2012, 2015, 2021
3.	(Italy) Piemonte Volley	3	2	1997, 1998, 2010
4.	(Latvian Soviet Socialist Republic) (Latvia) Elektrotechnika Riga	3		1974, 1975, 1977
=	(Italy) Pallavolo Parma	3		1988, 1989, 1990
6.	(Greece) Olympiacos	2	2	1996, 2005
7.	(Russian Soviet Federative Socialist Republic) (Russia) Avtomobilist Leningrad	2	1	1982, 1983
=	(Italy) Volley Treviso	2	1	1994, 2011
9.	(Italy) Gabeca Pallavolo	2		1991, 1992
=	(France) Paris Volley	2		2000, 2014
=	(Russia) Belogorie Belgorod	2		2009, 2018
12.	(Italy) Gonzaga Milano	1	2	1993
=	(Italy) Trentino Volley	1	2	2019
=	(Poland) Resovia	1	2	2024
15.	(Ukrainian Soviet Socialist Republic) (Ukraine) Zvezda Voroshilovgrad	1	1	1973
=	(Czechoslovakia) ČH Bratislava	1	1	1981
=	(Italy) CUS Torino Pallavolo	1	1	1984
=	(Italy) Zinella Volley	1	1	1987
=	(France) AS Cannes	1	1	1999
=	(Portugal) SC Espinho	1	1	2001
=	(Ukraine) Lokomotiv Kharkiv	1	1	2004
=	(France) Tours VB	1	1	2017
=	(Belgium) Knack Roeselare	1	1	2002
=	(Turkey) Ziraat Bankası Ankara	1	1	2025
25.	(Bulgaria) CSKA Sofia	1		1976
=	(Czechoslovakia) Rudá Hvězda Praha	1		1978
=	(Romania) Dinamo București	1		1979
=	(Netherlands) Piet Zoomers Apeldoorn	1		2003
=	(Italy) Volley Piacenza	1		2006
=	(Slovenia) ACH Volley Bled	1		2007
=	(Italy) M. Roma Volley	1		2008
=	(Turkey) Halkbank Ankara	1		2013
=	(Germany) Berlin Recycling Volleys	1		2016
=	(Italy) Vero Volley Monza	1		2022
=	(Italy) Piacenza	1		2026
36.	(Bulgaria) Levski Sofia		6
37.	(Romania) Steaua București		3
38.	(Greece) Panathinaikos		2
=	(Spain) CV Pòrtol		2
=	(Germany) SVG Lüneburg		2
41.	(Hungary) Csepel Budapest		1
=	(Poland) AZS Olsztyn		1
=	(Spain) Numancia Soria		1
=	(Germany) Bayer Wuppertal		1
=	(Russia) Izumrud Ekaterinburg		1
=	(Romania) Deltacons Tulcea		1
=	(Netherlands) Ortec Nesselande		1
=	(Belgium) Maaseik		1
=	(Russia) Iskra Odintsovo		1
=	(Poland) ZAKSA		1
=	(Italy) Andreoli Latina		1
=	(Russia) Nizhny Novgorod		1
=	(Russia) Gazprom-Ugra Surgut		1
=	(Turkey) Galatasaray		1
=	(Russia) Zenit Saint Petersburg		1

== Titles by country ==
Rank	Country	Won	Runner–up	Total
1	Italy	22	11	33
2	(Russian Soviet Federative Socialist Republic) Russia	8	6	14
3	France	4	2	6
4	(Latvian Soviet Socialist Republic) Latvia	3	0	3
5	Greece	2	4	6
6	Turkey	2	2	4
=	(Ukrainian Soviet Socialist Republic) Ukraine	2	2	4
8	Czechoslovakia	2	1	3
9	Bulgaria	1	6	7
10	Romania	1	4	5
10	Poland	1	4	5
12	Germany	1	3	4
13	Belgium	1	2	3
14	Netherlands	1	1	2
14	Portugal	1	1	2
16	Slovenia	1	–	1
17	Spain	–	3	3
18	Hungary	–	1	1
