= CEV Challenge Cup =

Annual European third-tier level volleyball competition

- Most recent season or competition: 2026–27 CEV Challenge Cup
- Formerly: CEV Cup (1980–2007)
- Sport: Volleyball
- Founded: 1980; 46 years ago
- Administrator: CEV
- No. of teams: 32 (Main phase)
- Country: CEV members
- Continent: Europe
- Most recent champions: (Italy) Power Volley Milano (2nd title)
- Most titles: (Italy) Modena Volley (5 titles)
- Website: Official website

The CEV Challenge Cup is the third-tier competition for European men's volleyball clubs, organised by the European Volleyball Confederation (CEV).

The competition started in the 1980–81 season under the name CEV Cup. In 2007, it was renamed to CEV Challenge Cup.

== History ==
- CEV Cup (1980–81 to 2006–2007)
- CEV Challenge Cup (2007–08 to present)

== Title holders ==
- 1980–81: (France) AS Cannes
- 1981–82: (Netherlands) Starlift Voorburg
- 1982–83: (Italy) Modena Volley
- 1983–84: (Italy) Modena Volley
- 1984–85: (Italy) Modena Volley
- 1985–86: (Italy) Pallavolo Falconara
- 1986–87: (Italy) Volley Gonzaga Milano
- 1987–88: (Soviet Union) Avtomobilist Leningrad
- 1988–89: (Soviet Union) Avtomobilist Leningrad
- 1989–90: (West Germany) Moerser SC
- 1990–91: (Italy) Volley Treviso
- 1991–92: (Italy) Pallavolo Parma
- 1992–93: (Italy) Volley Treviso
- 1993–94: (Italy) Pallavolo Padova
- 1994–95: (Italy) Pallavolo Parma
- 1995–96: (Italy) Piemonte Volley
- 1996–97: (Italy) Porto Ravenna Volley
- 1997–98: (Italy) Volley Treviso
- 1998–99: (Italy) Palermo Volley
- 1999–00: (Italy) Roma Volley
- 2000–01: (Italy) Volley Lube
- 2001–02: (Italy) Piemonte Volley
- 2002–03: (Italy) Volley Treviso
- 2003–04: (Italy) Modena Volley
- 2004–05: (Italy) Volley Lube
- 2005–06: (Italy) Volley Lube
- 2006–07: (Russia) Fakel Novy Urengoy
- 2007–08: (Italy) Modena Volley
- 2008–09: (Turkey) Arkas İzmir
- 2009–10: (Italy) Umbria Volley
- 2010–11: (Italy) Volley Lube
- 2011–12: (Poland) AZS Częstochowa
- 2012–13: (Italy) Volley Piacenza
- 2013–14: (Turkey) Fenerbahçe
- 2014–15: (Serbia) Vojvodina Novi Sad
- 2015–16: (Italy) Verona Volley
- 2016–17: (Russia) Fakel Novy Urengoy
- 2017–18: (Italy) Porto Robur Costa
- 2018–19: (Russia) Belogorie Belgorod
- 2020–21: (Italy) Power Volley Milano
- 2021–22: (France) Narbonne Volley
- 2022–23: (Greece) Olympiacos
- 2023–24: (Poland) Projekt Warsaw
- 2024–25: (Poland) LKPS Lublin
- 2025–26: (Italy) Power Volley Milano

== Finals ==
=== CEV Cup ===
Year	Final			3rd Place Game	
Year	Champion	Score	Second place	Third place	Fourth place
1980–81; Details	(France); AS Cannes	Group Stage	(Italy); Amaro Più Loreto	(Italy); Santal Parma	(France); AS Grenobloise
1981–82; Details	(Netherlands); Starlift Voorburg	Group Stage	(Italy); Toseroni Roma	(Turkey); Güney Sanayi Adana	(Spain); Turavia Salesianos
1982–83; Details	(Italy); Panini Modena	Group Stage	(Netherlands); Orion Doetinchem	(France); AS Grenobloise	(France); Arago de Sète
1983–84; Details	(Italy); Panini Modena	Group Stage	(Italy); Casio Milano	(Netherlands); VVC Vught	(West Germany); Paderborn
1984–85; Details	(Italy); Panini Modena	Group Stage	(Socialist Federal Republic of Yugoslavia); Partizan Beograd	(Belgium); Kruikenburg Ternat	(Belgium); Hormann Gand
1985–86; Details	(Italy); Kutiba Falconara	Group Stage	(Socialist Federal Republic of Yugoslavia); OK Bosna	(Italy); Bistefani Torino	(Belgium); Kruikenburg Ternat
1986–87; Details	(Italy); Enermix Milano	Group Stage	(Italy); Santal Parma	(Czechoslovakia); Červená Hvězda Bratislava	(Belgium); VC Lennik
1987–88; Details	(Soviet Union); Avtomobilist Leningrad	3–1	(Italy); Ciesse Padova	(France); Montpellier UC	(France); Arago de Sète
1988–89; Details	(Soviet Union); Avtomobilist Leningrad	3–0	(Italy); Petrarca Padova	(Belgium); Debic Zonhoven	(France); JSA Bordeaux
1989–90; Details	(West Germany); Moerser SC	Group Stage	(Socialist Federal Republic of Yugoslavia); Partizan Beograd	(Soviet Union); Avtomobilist Leningrad	(France); AS Grenobloise
1990–91; Details	(Italy); Sisley Treviso	3–2	(Soviet Union); Elektrotechnika Riga	(Italy); Charro Padova	(Soviet Union); Dynamo Moscow
1991–92; Details	(Italy); Maxicono Parma	3–0	(Italy); Charro Padova	(Germany); Bayer Wuppertal	(Turkey); Galatasaray
1992–93; Details	(Italy); Sisley Treviso	3–0	(Italy); Charro Esperia Padova	(Russia); Dynamo Moscow	(Germany); Bayer Wuppertal
1993–94; Details	(Italy); Ignis Padova	3–0	(Russia); Samotlor	(Germany); VfB Friedrichshafen	(Germany); Bayer Wuppertal
1994–95; Details	(Italy); Pallavolo Parma	3–0	(Greece); AS Orestiada	(Italy); Tally Milano Gonzaga	(Russia); Samotlor
1995–96; Details	(Italy); Alpitour Traco Cuneo	3–0	(Italy); Edilcuoghi Ravenna	(Czech Republic); Aero Odolena Voda	(Greece); AS Orestiada
1996–97; Details	(Italy); Porto Ravenna Volley	3–0	(Turkey); Netaş İstanbul	(Germany); Bayer Wuppertal	(Czech Republic); Aero Odolena Voda
1997–98; Details	(Italy); Sisley Treviso	3–0	(Belgium); Knack Roeselare	(Italy); Lube Banca Marche Macerata	(Czech Republic); Jihostroj České Budějovice
1998–99; Details	(Italy); Palermo Volley	3–0	(Belgium); Knack Roeselare	(Germany); SCC Berlin	(Italy); Lube Banca Marche Macerata
1999–00; Details	(Italy); Roma Volley	3–2	(Italy); Casa Modena Unibon	(Poland); ZAKSA Kędzierzyn-Koźle	(Greece); AS Orestiada
2000–01; Details	(Italy); Lube Banca Marche Macerata	3–0	(Italy); Casa Modena Salumi	(Belgium); Noliko Maaseik	(Italy); Bossini Montichiari
2001–02; Details	(Italy); Noicom Cuneo	3–1	(Russia); Lokomotiv Belgorod	(Italy); Asystel Milano	(France); Stade Poitevin Poitiers
2002–03; Details	(Italy); Sisley Treviso	3–0	(Italy); Lube Banca Marche Macerata	(Russia); Iskra Odintsovo	(France); Tourcoing Lille Métropole
2003–04; Details	(Italy); Kerakoll Modena	3–2	(Italy); Coprasystel Ventaglio Piacenza	(Russia); Lokomotiv Ekaterinburg	(Greece); Panathinaikos
2004–05; Details	(Italy); Lube Banca Marche Macerata	3–2	(Spain); Son Amar Palma de Mallorca	(France); Tourcoing Lille Métropole	(Italy); Giotto Padova
2005–06; Details	(Italy); Lube Banca Marche Macerata	3–0	(Russia); Iskra Odintsovo	(France); Paris Volley	(Italy); Pallavolo Padova
2006–07; Details	(Russia); Fakel Novy Urengoy	3–0	(Italy); Copra Berni Piacenza	(Turkey); Halkbank Ankara	(France); Stade Poitevin Poitiers

=== CEV Challenge Cup ===
Year	Final			3rd Place Game	
Year	Champion	Score	Second place	Third place	Fourth place
2007–08; Details	(Italy); Cimone Modena	3–1	(Russia); Lokomotiv Ekaterinburg	(France); Stade Poitevin Poitiers	(Poland); Asseco Resovia
2008–09; Details	(Turkey); Arkas İzmir	3–2	(Poland); Jastrzębski Węgiel	(Romania); Tomis Constanța	(Greece); EAP
2009–10; Details	(Italy); Umbria Volley	3–0	(Croatia); Mladost Zagreb	(Germany); SCC Berlin	(Czech Republic); Dukla Liberec
2010–11; Details	(Italy); Lube Banca Marche Macerata	3–0, 3–2	(Turkey); Arkas İzmir		
2011–12; Details	(Poland); Tytan AZS Częstochowa	3–1, 2–3 (GS 18–16)	(Poland); AZS Politechnika Warszawska		
2012–13; Details	(Italy); Copra Elior Piacenza	3–0, 3–0	(Russia); Ural Ufa		
2013–14; Details	(Turkey); Fenerbahçe	2–3, 3–0	(Italy); Andreoli Latina		
2014–15; Details	(Serbia); Vojvodina Novi Sad	3–1, 2–3	(Portugal); Benfica		
2015–16; Details	(Italy); Calzedonia Verona	3–2, 3–2	(Russia); Fakel Novy Urengoy		
2016–17; Details	(Russia); Fakel Novy Urengoy	3–1, 3–1	(France); Chaumont VB 52		
2017–18; Details	(Italy); Bunge Ravenna	3–1, 3–1	(Greece); Olympiacos		
2018–19; Details	(Russia); Belogorie Belgorod	2–3, 3–0	(Italy); Vero Volley Monza		
2019–20; Details	Cancelled				
2020–21; Details	(Italy); Allianz Powervolley Milano	3–2, 3–2	(Turkey); Ziraat Bankası Ankara		
2021–22; Details	(France); Narbonne Volley	0–3, 3–1 (GS 21–19)	(Turkey); Halkbank Ankara		
2022–23; Details	(Greece); Olympiacos	3–0, 3–0	(Israel); Maccabi Tel Aviv		
2023–24; Details	(Poland); Projekt Warsaw	3–1, 3–1	(Italy); Vero Volley Monza		
2024–25; Details	(Poland); Bogdanka LUK Lublin	3–1, 2–3	(Italy); Cucine Lube Civitanova		
2025–26; Details	(Italy); Allianz Milano	3–0, 3–0	(Belgium); Lindemans Aalst		

== Titles by club ==
Rank	Club	Titles	Runner–up	Champion years
1.	(Italy) Modena Volley	5	2	1983, 1984, 1985, 2004, 2008
2.	(Italy) Volley Lube	4	2	2001, 2005, 2006, 2011
3.	(Italy) Volley Treviso	4		1991, 1993, 1998, 2003
4.	(Italy) Pallavolo Parma	2	1	1992, 1995
=	(Russia) Fakel Novy Urengoy	2	1	2007, 2017
6.	(Russian Soviet Federative Socialist Republic) (Russia) Avtomobilist Leningrad	2		1988, 1989
=	(Italy) Piemonte Volley	2		1996, 2002
=	(Italy) Power Volley Milano	2		2021, 2026
9.	(Italy) Pallavolo Padova	1	4	1994
10.	(Italy) Volley Piacenza	1	2	2013
11.	(Italy) Volley Gonzaga Milano	1	1	1987
=	(Italy) Porto Ravenna Volley	1	1	1997
=	(Turkey) Arkas İzmir	1	1	2009
=	(Russia) Belogorie Belgorod	1	1	2019
=	(Greece) Olympiacos	1	1	2023
=	(Poland) Projekt Warsaw	1	1	2024
17.	(France) AS Cannes	1		1981
=	(Netherlands) Starlift Voorburg	1		1982
=	(Italy) Pallavolo Falconara	1		1986
=	(West Germany) Moerser SC	1		1990
=	(Italy) Palermo Volley	1		1999
=	(Italy) Roma Volley	1		2000
=	(Italy) Umbria Volley	1		2010
=	(Poland) AZS Częstochowa	1		2012
=	(Turkey) Fenerbahçe	1		2014
=	(Serbia) Vojvodina Novi Sad	1		2015
=	(Italy) Verona Volley	1		2016
=	(Italy) Porto Robur Costa	1		2018
=	(France) Narbonne Volley	1		2022
=	(Poland) LKPS Lublin	1		2025
31.	(Socialist Federal Republic of Yugoslavia) Partizan Beograd		2
=	(Belgium) Knack Roeselare		2
=	(Italy) Vero Volley Monza		2
34.	(Italy) Amare più Loreto		1
=	(Italy) Toseroni Roma		1
=	(Netherlands) Orion Doetinchem		1
=	(Socialist Federal Republic of Yugoslavia) OK Bosna		1
=	(Soviet Union) Elektrotechnika Riga		1
=	(Russia) Samotlor		1
=	(Greece) AS Orestiada		1
=	(Turkey) Netaş İstanbul		1
=	(Spain) CV Pòrtol		1
=	(Russia) Iskra Odintsovo		1
=	(Russia) Lokomotiv Ekaterinburg		1
=	(Poland) Jastrzębski Węgiel		1
=	(Croatia) Mladost Zagreb		1
=	(Russia) Ural Ufa		1
=	(Italy) Top Volley Latina		1
=	(Portugal) Benfica		1
=	(France) Chaumont VB 52		1
=	(Turkey) Ziraat Bankası Ankara		1
=	(Turkey) Halkbank Ankara		1
=	(Israel) Maccabi Tel Aviv		1
=	(Belgium) Volley Aalst		1

== Titles by country ==
Rank	Country	Won	Runner–up	Total
1	Italy	29	18	47
2	(Russian Soviet Federative Socialist Republic) Russia	5	6	11
3	Poland	3	2	5
4	Turkey	2	4	6
5	France	2	1	3
6	Greece	1	2	3
7	Netherlands	1	1	2
8	Serbia	1	–	1
8	West Germany	1	–	1
10	Yugoslavia	–	3	3
10	Belgium	–	3	3
12	Croatia	–	1	1
12	(Latvian Soviet Socialist Republic) Latvia	–	1	1
12	Israel	–	1	1
12	Portugal	–	1	1
12	Spain	–	1	1
