= Pallavolo Parma =

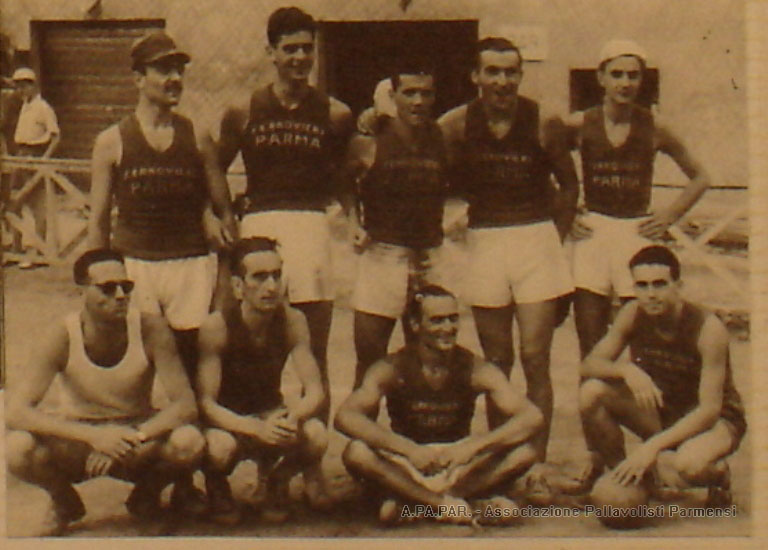
- Founded: 1946 as Ferrovieri Parma (expired in 1996)
- Ground: PalaRaschi

The Pallavolo Parma was one of the oldest and most successful professional man's volleyball clubs in Italy. Its colours were white and azure.

Founded in Parma in the 1940s, after a sequence of incorporations with other teams, it is currently disappeared from Italian professional volleyball panorama. It won 8 national titles, 2 CEV Champions League and a number of other Italian and European trophies.

== History ==
Founded in 1946 for initiative of the Railroaders's Recreative Club as Ferrovieri Parma, the team took part for the first time at Serie A in 1949 and won its first national title in 1950. In 1954 Ferrovieri merged into CUS Parma.

In the 1960s the Gruppo Sportivo Salvarani supported briefly the club, which won another championship in 1969.

In 1980 Parmalat Industries started to economically supported the club, declined in the 1970s. Sponsored by Santal, it won two national titles, three Coppa Italia and two CEV Champions League. In 1987 Parmalat was replaced by another sponsor, Maxicono Motta, and the club could extend its winning tradition in Italy and in Europe.

In 1996, for economical reasons, Pallavolo Parma did not enrol at Serie A1 and restarted from the lower division. It has been renamed Sky Volley in 1996 and disappeared in 2004. Audax Parma is today in Serie B2 division.

== References and sources ==
- (in Italian) Profile on Legavolley.it
