= Virtus Pallavolo Bologna =

Virtus Pallavolo Bologna was the volleyball section of the Multi-sports club, S.E.F. Virtus (the most famous representative of the club today is Virtus Pallacanestro Bologna).

== History ==
Virtus Pallavolo was born in 1962 (dissolved 1974) and absorbed the team of the league foundries; the latter that year Virtus had his Serie A debut. Bologna became the new partnership for a decade protagonist of the Italian League. Coached by the Modenese Odone Federzoni, Virtus won his first championship at the end of the 1965–66 season, after a playoff win in Milan against Ruini Firenze. In 1966-67 Vitus made the repeat, demonstrating an overwhelming superiority: it was the best performance ever offered by a team in the national championship. Virtus won all twenty-two matches, losing only on September 6 during the whole tournament. Only Robe di Kappa Torino in 1980-81 (100% of victories, 7 September lost in vendidue races) came to matching the primates of 1966-67 Virtus. With these two titles masher Gian Franco Zanetti reached the major share of nine Italian titles won in his career, a record that stood unmatched for over thirty years. Another star symbol of the years of Virtus Pallavolo spiker is the Zuppiroli Paolo Bolognese player with exceptional athletic ability and then the national team.

In the following years it began a period of economic decline for Virtus, who in the early seventies also experienced the crisis of the basketball team, its flagship; the survival of the volleyball section was guaranteed by several sponsors (Minganti, Rhenish, Lubiam), and the bianconero club could always guarantee a role to title contenders (at the end of the 1968–69 season was defeated in a playoff for the title from Salvarani Parma, in 1972-73 and in 1973-74 ranked in second place) until, in 1974, for lack of funds, was forced to withdraw from the league. Subsequently, the CUS Bologna was promoted in A1 in the 1977–1978 season. Demoted as Pallavolo Bologna, within the year following Mapier Bologna, became champion of Italy in 1984–85.

== Honours & achievements ==
Italian League

- Winners (2): 1965–66, 1966–67
- Runners-up (3): 1968–69, 1972–73, 1973–74
