= Volleyball (ball) =

Ball used in volleyball

A volleyball is a ball used to play indoor volleyball, beach volleyball, or other less common variations of the sport. Volleyballs are spherical in shape and typically comprise eighteen nearly rectangular panels made from synthetic or genuine leather. These panels are organized into six identical sections, each consisting of three panels. They are carefully wrapped around a bladder to form the complete volleyball. A valve permits the internal air pressure to be adjusted. In a break from the traditional construction, in 2008, the FIVB adopted as its official indoor ball a new Mikasa with dimples and only eight panels for a softer touch and truer flight.

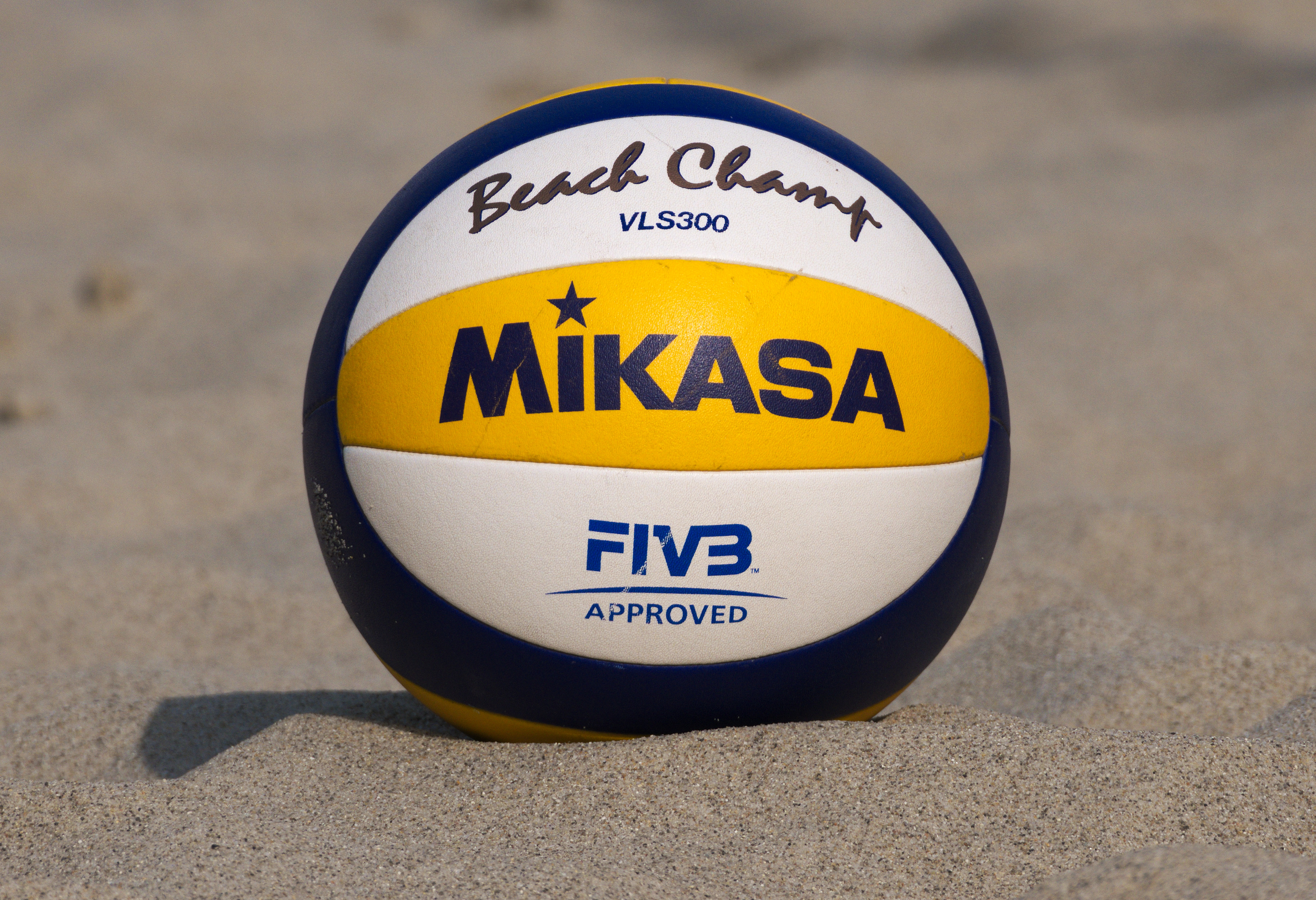
Mikasa VLS300 official beach volleyball FIVB beach events (2017)

== Volleyball characteristics ==
Indoor volleyballs are specifically designed for the indoor version of the sport, while beach volleyballs are tailored for the beach game.

Indoor volleyballs come in either a solid white color or the brightest shade of yellow. They are produced in two variations: a youth version, slightly smaller and lighter than adult volleyballs, and a heavier "medicine ball" type designed for setters to enhance finger strength.

Beach volleyballs are slightly larger than standard indoor balls, featuring a coarser external texture and lower internal pressure. They come in vibrant colors or a solid white option. The earliest volleyballs were crafted using leather panels over a rubber carcass.

Volleyball characteristics
	Circumference cm (inches)	Mass grams (ounces)	Internal pressure kgf/cm² (psi)
Standard indoor	65-67 (25.5-26.5)	260-280 (9.2-9.9)	0.3-0.325 (4.3-4.6)
Youth indoor	63-65 (25-26)	260-280 (9.2-9.9)	0.3 (4.3)
Beach	66-68 (26-27)	260-280 (9.2-9.9)	0.175-0.225 (2.5-3.2)

=== Major brands ===
There are several brands of competitive volleyballs in use, including, but not limited to:

- NIVIA Volleyball
- Tachikara
- Molten
- Wilson
- Mikasa
- Mizuno
- Nike
- Spalding

Most of these brands also make cheaper variations for recreational (non-competitive) use.

=== Adopted use ===
- Mikasa makes the official balls of the Fédération Internationale de Volleyball and the CEV - European Volleyball Confederation (beach and indoor).
- Molten makes the official ball of USA Volleyball.
- Molten makes the official ball of NCAA indoor volleyball.
- Wilson makes the official ball of the Association of Volleyball Professionals (beach) and NCAA beach volleyball.

=== History ===
In 1895, the initial development of the Volleyball ball was made of a basket bladder according to William G. Morgan, the inventor of Volleyball.

== See also ==
- Official ball supplier
- List of inflatable manufactured goods
