= Italian Volleyball League =

Male Italian Volleyball League System

- Current season, competition or edition: 2026–27 SuperLega
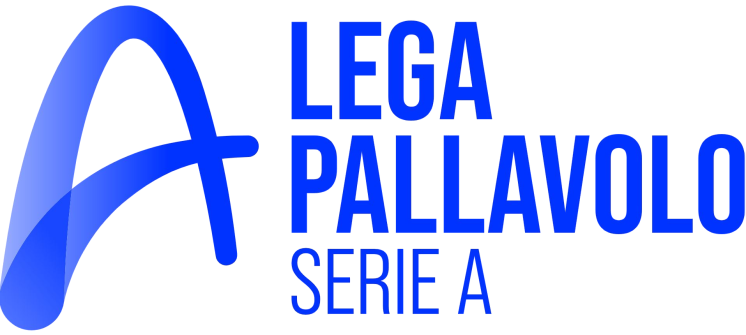
- Sport: Volleyball
- Founded: 1946; 80 years ago
- Administrator: Italian Volleyball Federation (FIPAV)
- No. of teams: 12
- Country: Italy
- Confederation: CEV
- Continent: Europe
- Most recent champion: Sir Safety Susa Perugia (2025-26)
- Most titles: Modena Volley (12 titles)
- Broadcaster: Rai Sport
- Streaming partners: Volleyball World; Volleyball World
- Sponsor: Credito Emiliano
- Relegation to: Serie A2
- International cups: CEV Champions League; CEV Cup
- Website: legavolley.it

The Lega Pallavolo Serie A is structured in several levels of importance; the highest of them is SuperLega (formerly Serie A1). Since the early 1980s, many among the best volleyball players in the world play in Superlega and the overall level of competition is considerably high. Nowadays, the SuperLega is widely considered the best league in the world.

== Structure ==
As of 2016–17 season, the Italian volleyball championships are parted in this way:

- SuperLega (highest level, 12 teams);
- Serie A2 (second level, 14 teams);
- Serie A3 (third level, 28 teams);
- Serie B (fourth level, 14 teams in 9 rounds);
- Serie C, organized by regional committees;
- Serie D, organized by regional committees;
- Prima Divisione, organized by provincial committees;
- Seconda Divisione, organized by provincial committees;
- Terza Divisione, organized by provincial committees.

== SuperLega ==
SuperLega is the highest level club competition in Italian professional male volleyball. It is organized by Federazione Italiana Pallavolo (FIPAV) and Lega Pallavolo Serie A. It was known as Serie A between 1946 and 1977, then as Serie A1 until 2014.

Since 1982, the championship consists of two phases:

- a round-robin tournament (regular season) which picks out the clubs admitted to the second phase and the teams destined to relegation;
- a playoff tournament, which assigned the trophy.

Just in few occasions relegation playouts were disputed.

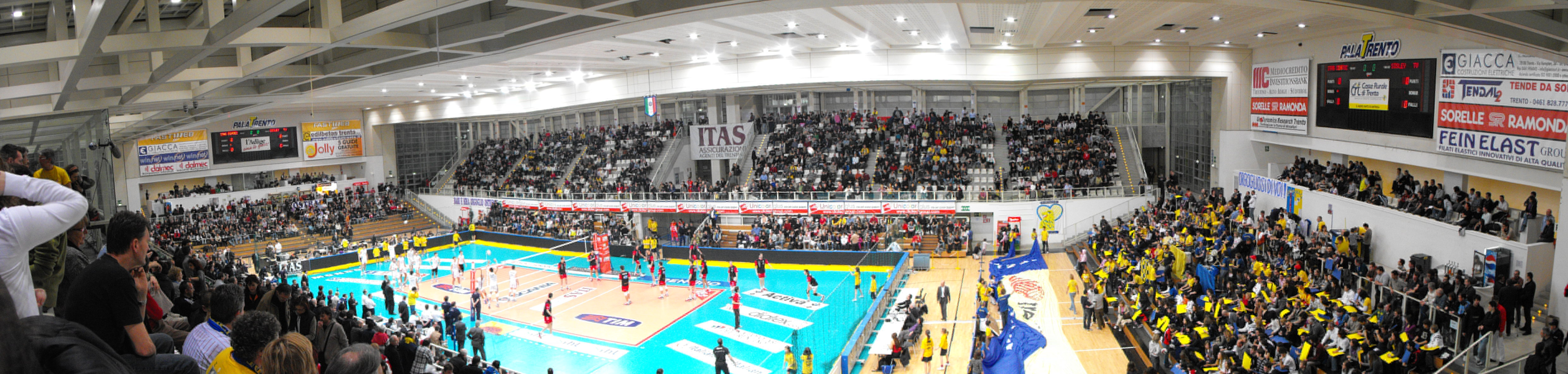
Picture taken during a volleyball match in Trento.

=== History ===
Volleyball made its first appearance in Italy after the end of World War I. In 1929 a Federazione Italiana Palla a Volo (FIPV) was founded. During the 1930s several tournaments were organized by youth or workers movements within fascist associations like GIL and OND.

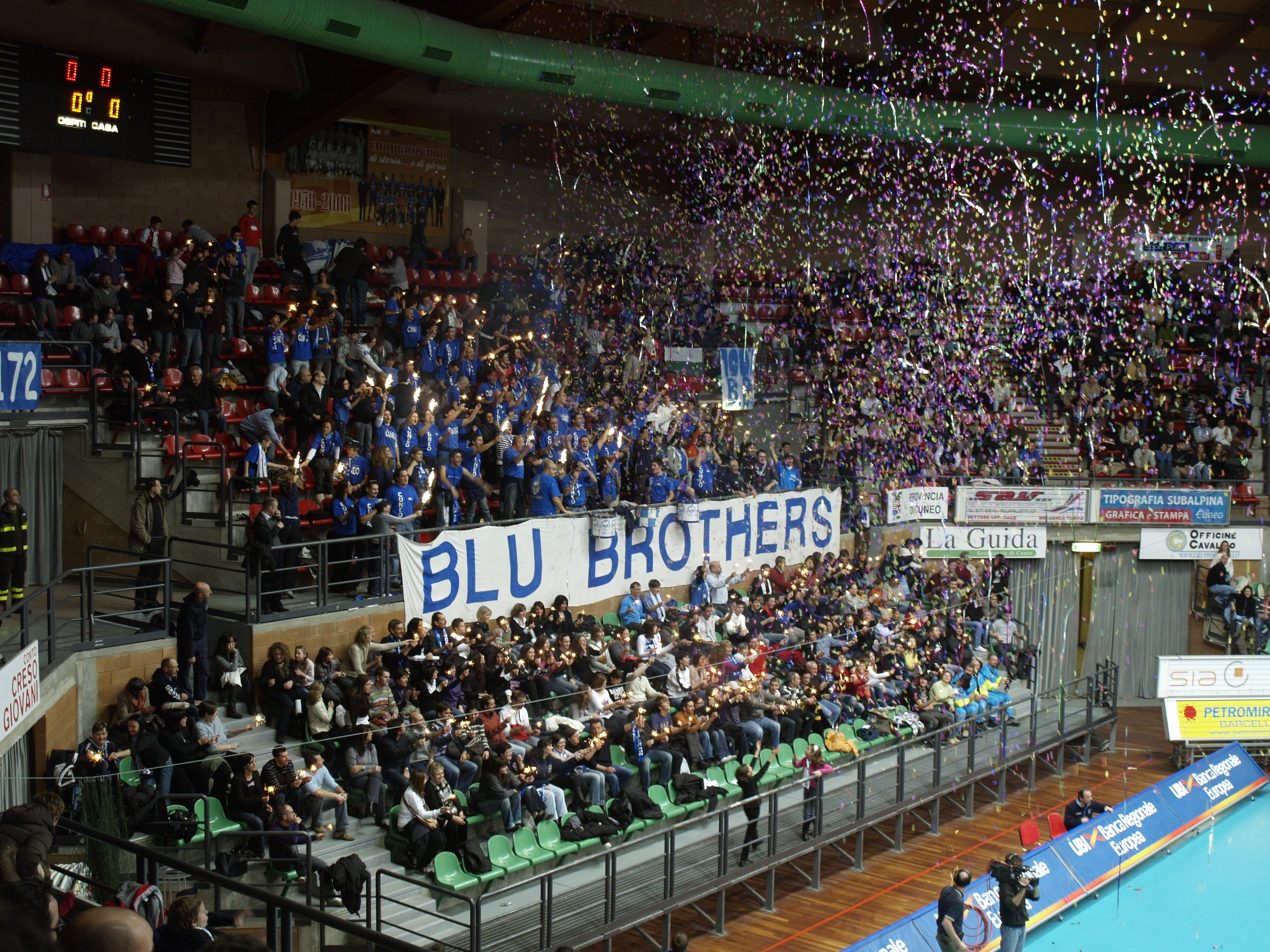
Crowd attending a volleyball match in Cuneo.

After the end of World War II and the overthrow of fascist regime, a new association, called Federazione Italiana Pallavolo, were founded in 1946. Later that year the city of Genoa hosted the first official male championship.

Quickly volleyball became popular in northern regions like Piedmont, Lombardy and especially Emilia-Romagna and Tuscany: clubs based on Ravenna, Modena, Parma, Bologna and Florence regularly won all the championships for more than thirty years. By the 1970s outsider clubs from centre-south cities (Rome, Catania) were more competitive.

In the 1980s the growth of Italy men's national volleyball team led volleyball to a peak of a popularity. After a period in which Turin's CUS and Parma's Santal dominated, great entrepreneurial companies (like Fininvest in Milan, Montedison in Ravenna and Benetton in Treviso) decided to support and invest in volleyball, equipping strong teams which often won European and Intercontinental trophies. During the 1990s and 2000s decades, Serie A1 was by far the best volleyball league in the world, due to the simultaneous presence of all Italian's golden generation members and even all the best foreign players from all over the world (Netherlands, Brazil, Cuba, Russia etc.). All along 1990s, Italian teams dominated all European club competitions and Serie A1 was called "the NBA of volleyball".

=== Situation ===
Serie A1 is the top professional volleyball league in Italy. The sport is played across the country, but tends to have a stronger following in small and medium-sized cities. In larger cities, football and other sports traditionally attract more attention.

=== Champions ===
==== 1936–1941 (OND tournaments) ====
These tournaments were organized by the National Recreational Club (Opera Nazionale Dopolavoro).

- 1936: Azogeno Vado Ligure
- 1937: Azogeno Vado Ligure
- 1938: Torti Alessandria
- 1939: Azogeno Vado Ligure
- 1940: not held
- 1941: Lanerossi Schio

==== 1946–today (FIPAV tournaments) ====
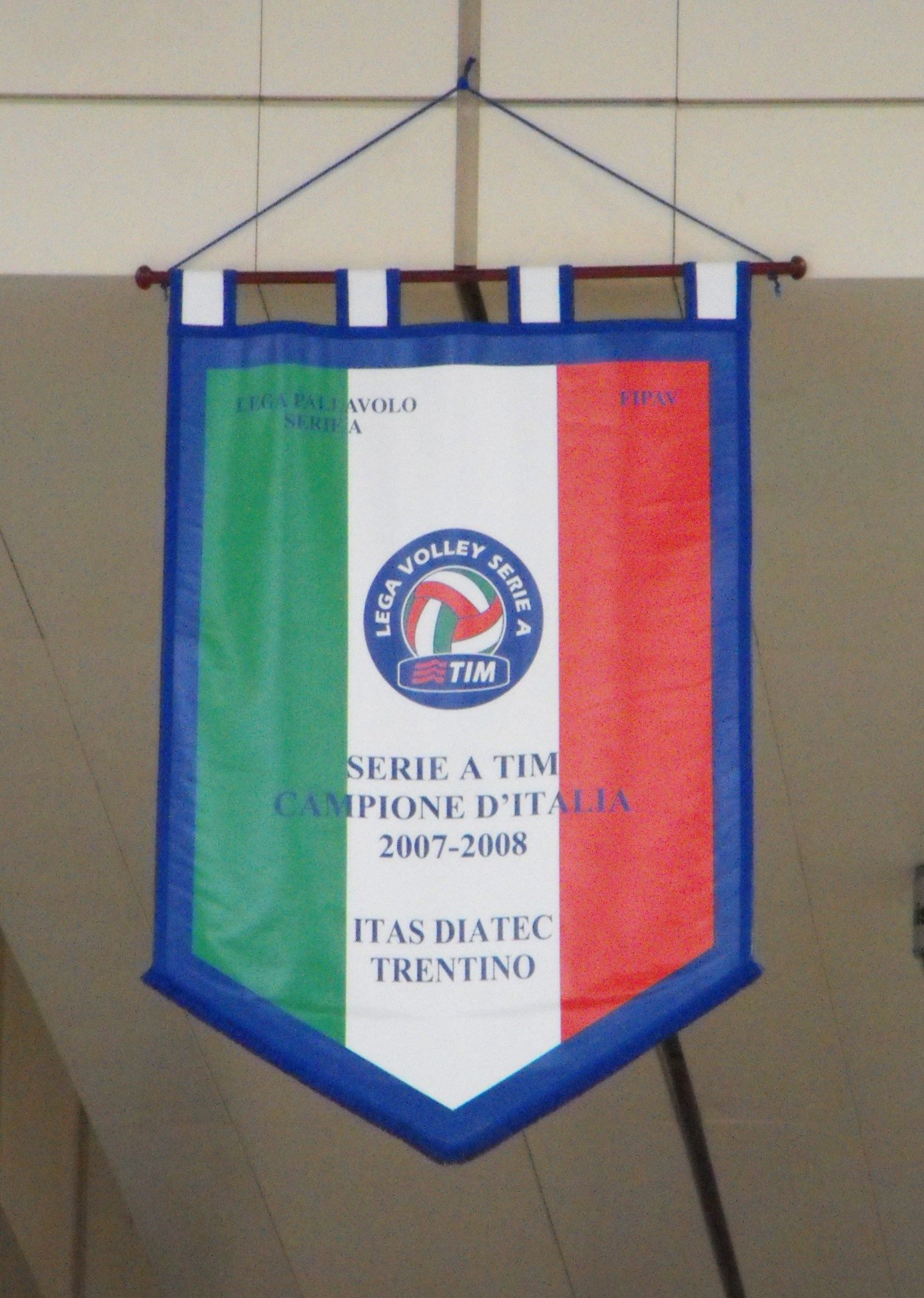
2007–08 Itas Diatecc Trentino's celebrative gonfalon.

Season	Champions	Runners-up
1946	Robur Ravenna	Borsalino Alessandria
1947	Robur Ravenna	Borsalino Alessandria
1948	Robur Ravenna	Lega Navale Vercelli
1949	Robur Ravenna	Ferrovieri Parma
1950	Ferrovieri Parma	Robur Ravenna
1951	Ferrovieri Parma	Robur Ravenna
1952	Robur Ravenna	Multedo 1930 Genova
1953	Minelli Modena	Multedo 1930 Genova
1954	Minelli Modena	Avia Pervia Modena
1955	Minelli Modena	Crocetta Modena
1956	Crocetta Modena	Minelli Modena
1957	Avia Pervia Modena	Sestese Sesto Fiorentino
1958	Ciam Modena	Avia Pervia Modena
1959	Avia Pervia Modena	Ciam Modena
1960	Avia Pervia Modena	Ciam Modena
1961	Ciam Modena	Avia Pervia Modena
1962	Interauto Modena	Ciam Modena
1962–63	Avia Pervia Modena	Ciam Modena
1963–64	Ruini Firenze	Smalteria Ghirlandina Modena
1964–65	Ruini Firenze	Parma
1965–66	Virtus Bologna	Ruini Firenze
1966–67	Virtus Bologna	Salvarani Parma
1967–68	Ruini Firenze	Salvarani Parma
1968–69	Parma	Minganti Bologna
1969–70	Panini Modena	Ruini Firenze
1970–71	Ruini Firenze	Panini Modena
1971–72	Panini Modena	Ruini Firenze
1972–73	Ruini Firenze	Lubiam Bologna
1973–74	Panini Modena	Lubiam Bologna
1974–75	Ariccia	Torino
1975–76	Panini Modena	Klippan Torino
1976–77	Federlazio Roma	Paoletti Catania
1977–78	Paoletti Catania	Federlazio Roma
1978–79	Klippan Torino	Panini Modena
1979–80	Klippan Torino	Paoletti Catania
1980–81	Robe di Kappa Torino	Panini Modena
1981–82	Santal Parma	Robe di Kappa Torino
1982–83	Santal Parma	Robe di Kappa Torino
1983–84	Robe di Kappa Torino	Santal Parma
1984–85	Mapier Bologna	Panini Modena
1985–86	Panini Modena	Tartarini Bologna
1986–87	Panini Modena	Santal Parma
1987–88	Panini Modena	Maxicono Parma
1988–89	Panini Modena	Maxicono Parma
1989–90	Maxicono Parma	Philips Modena
1990–91	il Messaggero Ravenna	Maxicono Parma
1991–92	Maxicono Parma	il Messaggero Ravenna
1992–93	Maxicono Parma	Misura Milano
1993–94	Sisley Treviso	Mediolanum Milano
1994–95	Daytona Las Modena	Sisley Treviso
1995–96	Sisley Treviso	Alpitour Traco Cuneo
1996–97	Las Daytona Modena	Sisley Treviso
1997–98	Sisley Treviso	Alpitour Traco Cuneo
1998–99	Sisley Treviso	Casa Modena Unibon
1999–00	Piaggio Roma	Casa Modena Unibon
2000–01	Sisley Treviso	Asystel Milano
2001–02	Unibon Modena	Sisley Treviso
2002–03	Sisley Treviso	Kerakoll Modena
2003–04	Sisley Treviso	Copra Asystel Ventaglio Piacenza
2004–05	Sisley Treviso	RPA LuigiBacchi.it Perugia
2005–06	Lube Banca Marche Macerata	Sisley Treviso
2006–07	Sisley Treviso	Copra Berni Piacenza
2007–08	Itas Diatec Trentino	Copra Nordmeccanica Piacenza
2008–09	Copra Nordmeccanica Piacenza	Itas Diatec Trentino
2009–10	Bre Banca Lannutti Cuneo	Itas Diatec Trentino
2010–11	Itas Diatec Trentino	Bre Banca Lannutti Cuneo
2011–12	Lube Banca Marche Macerata	Itas Diatec Trentino
2012–13	Itas Diatec Trentino	Copra Elior Piacenza
2013–14	Lube Banca Marche Macerata	Sir Safety Perugia
2014–15	Itas Diatec Trentino	Parmareggio Modena
2015–16	DHL Modena	Sir Safety Perugia
2016–17	Cucine Lube Civitanova	Diatec Trentino
2017–18	Sir Safety Perugia	Cucine Lube Civitanova
2018–19	Cucine Lube Civitanova	Sir Safety Perugia
2019–20	Cancelled due to COVID-19 pandemic	
2020–21	Cucine Lube Civitanova	Sir Safety Perugia
2021–22	Cucine Lube Civitanova	Sir Safety Perugia
2022–23	Itas Trentino	Cucine Lube Civitanova
2023–24	Sir Safety Perugia	Vero Volley Monza
2024–25	Itas Diatec Trentino	Cucine Lube Civitanova
2025–26	Sir Safety Perugia	Cucine Lube Civitanova

=== Teams ===
The following teams compete in the SuperLega during 2026-27 season:

Location of 2026-27 SuperLega teams.

Team		Stadium	Capacity
CUN	Acqua Sant'Anna Cuneo	Palasport di Cuneo	4,700
MIL	Allianz Milano	Allianz Cloud Arena	5,420
CIS	Cisterna Volley	Palasport di Cisterna di Latina	3,044
CVA	Cucine Lube Civitanova	Eurosuole Forum	4,060
PIA	Gas Sales Bluenergy Piacenza	PalaBanca Sport	3,459
TRE	Itas Trentino	BLM Group Arena	4,000
PAD	Pallavolo Padova	Kioene Arena	3,400
VER	Rana Verona	AGSM Forum	5,200
PGA	Sir Safety Susa Perugia	PalaBarton	4,986
PRA	Tinet Prata di Pordenone	Palasport Crisafulli	3,003
MOD	Valsa Group Modena	PalaPanini	3,000
MZA	Vero Volley Monza	Arena di Monza	3,983

== Serie A2 ==
Serie A2 is the second highest level club competition in Italian professional male volleyball. It is organized by Federazione Italiana Pallavolo (FIPAV) and Lega Pallavolo Serie A. It was created in 1977 by splitting the previous Serie A in two tiers (Serie A1 and Serie A2).

== Sponsor ==
- 1989–91: Wuber Salumi
- 1991–95: Acqua Boario
- 1995–97: Kraft
- 1997–99: La Trentina
- 1999-03: LG Electronics
- 2003–10: TIM
- 2010–12: Sustenium Plus
- 2012–13: Linkem
- 2013–14: UnipolSai
- 2013–: UnipolSai – Del Monte – Mikasa
- 2021–: Credem Banca – Del Monte – Mikasa – Italtelo

== Sources ==
- Almanacco Illustrato del Volley – 1987, Panini Edizioni, Modena, 1986
