= Nancy Marcus =

American biologist and college administrator

Dean of the Florida State University Graduate School
- In office August 9, 2005 – 2017
- Preceded by: Dianne F. Harrison
- Succeeded by: Mark Riley

Chair of the Florida State University Department of Oceanography
- In office 2003–2004

Director of the Florida State University Marine Laboratory
- In office 1989–2001

Personal details
- Born: Nancy Helen Marcus; May 17, 1950 New York City, U.S.
- Died: February 12, 2018 (aged 67)
- Spouse: Cecile Reynaud (m. 1992)
- Education: Goucher College (B.A.); Yale University (M.A., Ph.D.)

Nancy Helen Marcus (May 17, 1950 – February 12, 2018) was an American biologist and oceanographer. During her graduate studies, Marcus became known as an expert on copepod ecology and evolutionary biology. She began her career as a postdoctoral fellow at the Woods Hole Oceanographic Institution where she studied copepod dormancy and its implications for marine aquaculture. She continued her field research as a professor of oceanography and later as the director of the Florida State University Marine Laboratory (FSU). During this time, Marcus was elected as a Fellow of the Association for Women in Science and the American Association for the Advancement of Science and served as the president of the Association for the Sciences of Limnology and Oceanography. As the president, she led efforts to increase education activities and increase the endowment fund.

In 2005, Marcus transitioned from the sciences to college administration when she was appointed Dean of the FSU Graduate School. During her tenure, FSU nearly doubled the number of doctoral degrees awarded annually. She created several graduate academic programs and the FSU Office of Graduate Fellowships and Awards. Marcus served a term as chair of the Board of Directors for the Council of Graduate Schools to address the future of graduate education. Outside of academia, Marcus was a magician and ventriloquist. She served on the Goucher College Board of Trustees from 2009 to 2016 and was previously the chair of the academic affairs committee. Marcus died on February 12, 2018, after two years of treatment for uveal melanoma.

== Early life and education ==
Nancy Helen Marcus was born in New York City on May 17, 1950, to Betty Levy and Harold T. Marcus of New Rochelle, New York. She was raised in New Rochelle with her brother Theodore. At the age of 10, Marcus began performing magic and ventriloquism, continuing to practice the former into adulthood. She became interested in science from a young age.

Marcus attended her mother's alma mater, Goucher College. In 1971, Marcus was on a team of undergraduate researchers from Goucher and Towson University who participated in a study entitled "An Analysis on the Degradation of Lake Roland." The students received a $13,140 grant from the National Science Foundation (NSF) to complete the investigation. In her senior year, Marcus and a colleague conducted field research on phytoplankton at the Duke University Marine Lab in January 1972. During her undergraduate studies, Marcus also studied at the Bermuda Biological Station for Research. She was encouraged to pursue graduate studies by researchers she met at Goucher. Marcus earned a Bachelor of Arts degree in Biology in 1972.

She completed a master's degree and Doctorate in Biology with a concentration in Ecology and Evolutionary Biology from Yale University in 1976. Her dissertation was titled Genotypic and Phenotypic Variation in the Sea Urchin Arbacia Punctulata (Gray). She dedicated her dissertation to Mary E. Clutter of NSF. Her doctoral advisor was Joseph Ramus. Marcus received funding support through grants-in-aid from Sigma Xi, NSF grant, NICHD Training Grant, NSF Traineeship, and Yale University Fellowships. She became known as an accomplished oceanographer and an expert on the study of copepods through her graduate research and studies.

== Career ==
=== Career beginnings at Woods Hole ===
Marcus worked as a postdoctoral fellow at the Woods Hole Oceanographic Institution from 1976 to 1978. Her expertise was in the ecology and evolutionary biology of copepods. In 1978, Marcus was hired as an associate scientist in the biology department at the Woods Hole Oceanographic Institution. She researched dormancy in copepods and how it applies to marine aquaculture. In 1984, Marcus and associate scientist George Grice completed a two and a half week trip in China at the invitation of professor Zheng Zhong, the founder of the marine biology program at Xiamen University. Marcus and Grice presented papers on the reproductive biology of copepods. Marcus stated that "there's great interest in the type of work we're doing and a need for U.S. scientific equipment and expertise." Starting in September 1984, a visiting scientist from Xiamen researched in Marcus' lab for a year.

=== Research at Florida State University ===
Marcus began working at Florida State University (FSU) as an associate professor of oceanography in 1987. She became a full professor in 1991. In September 1993, Marcus was selected to serve for one year as vice president followed by two years as the president of the Association for the Sciences of Limnology and Oceanography (ASLO). She instituted three goals during her presidency of ASLO including first, a Bylaws revision, second, new Educations Initiatives such as a workshop titled "The Use of Emerging Computer Technologies in Undergraduate Education", and a "Science Day" at University of Wisconsin–Milwaukee, and third, increasing the Endowment Fund. Marcus was later commended by ASLO in 1998 for her efforts to increase education activities. In 1993, Marcus received $56,000 from a three-year NSF grant.

From 1989 to 2001, Marcus served as the director of the FSU Marine Laboratory. She was a coordinator of the University's National Sea Grant. In 2001, Marcus was the director of the University's Women in Math, Science, and Engineering program. In the summer of 2001, Marcus issued a joint comment with professors Patricia Yancey Martin, Jean G. Bryant, Dianne F. Harrison, Gary R. Heald, Sheila Ortiz-Taylor, Pamela L. Perrewé, and David W. Rasmussen on status of women in academia the biases and "subtle, non-conscious forms of discrimination" that persist. Marcus was the Chair of the Department of Oceanography in 2003. Her later research investigated the impacts of decreased oxygen levels on the population dynamics of marine copepods. Marcus conducted field research in the Gulf of Mexico, off the coast of Northern California, in Narragansett Bay, and in the Gulf of Maine.

Through the mid-1970s, the study of marine organisms was hampered by an inability to culture and maintain species in a laboratory environment. Marcus was involved in the creation of a "standardized system and management protocol for rearing marine fish larvae". She built two greenhouses at FSU, which were later converted into laboratories to evaluate interactions between aquatic species and study marine plants. The laboratories allowed her to expand her work on dormant eggs and classify them into categories, which allowed researchers to maintain stable production. She discovered that certain dormant eggs were resistant to contamination and they could be used as inoculum in the development of copepod cultures. In 2003, Marcus organized a conference sponsored by the National Oceanic and Atmospheric Administration for Hawaii Pacific University's Oceanic Institute to present their studies and evaluate the status of research in culturing copepods and larviculture. The results of the conference were presented in a book, co-edited by Marcus, Copepods in Aquaculture, which has become a "seminal work" for researchers analyzing copepod behavior and uses, as well as their propagation and application to the study of other marine species.

=== Dean of graduate school ===
Marcus succeeded Dianne F. Harrison as Dean of the Graduate School at FSU on August 9, 2005. She co-created the Master of Science in aquatic environmental sciences at FSU with Jeff Chanton. From 2011 to 2012, Marcus was the president of the Conference of Southern Graduate Schools. After serving for five years on the Council of Graduate Schools Board of Directors, Marcus was appointed Chair for the 2016 term. She succeeded Mark Smith in 2017. In this capacity, Marcus led the board to address the direction of graduate school education. President of the Council of Graduate Schools, Suzanne Ortega, stated that Marcus "[was] a compelling advocate for graduate education." Ortega also remarked that "as graduate dean, she has given particular attention to broadening career opportunities for graduates and has developed programs to support their success in a range of sectors — academia, industry and government...the CGS board of directors will benefit greatly from her leadership and expertise."

Marcus stated in 2016 that FSU was awarding more than 400 doctoral degrees annually, an increase from the 200s that were awarded when she started as a dean 10 years earlier. As the Dean of the Graduate School, Marcus created programs including the Fellows Society which promotes communication between students in different academic programs, a professional development program to prepare students for positions after graduation, and the Office of Graduate Fellowships and Awards to assist students with finding and applying for grants. She resigned in 2016 from the Goucher College Board of Trustees after serving since 2009. Marcus was previously the chair of the Goucher College Academic Affairs committee. She stepped down as the Dean of the Graduate School at FSU in the summer of 2017. In August 2017, Mark Riley was appointed Dean of the Graduate School. From August 2017 through the end of the fall term, Marcus was the Lawton Professor in the Department of Earth, Ocean, and Atmospheric Science. She retired from FSU at the end of 2017.

== Personal life ==
Marcus married volleyball educator and coach Cecile Reynaud, circa 1992. Her hobbies included tennis, golf, and volleyball. She also walked trails, traveled, and cooked. She was a certified boat captain and would frequently go fishing and boating in the Gulf of Mexico. On February 12, 2018, Marcus died in Tallahassee, Florida, after two years of aggressive treatment for uveal melanoma. Following her death, a service was held at the FSU Alumni Center Grand Ballroom and the Nancy Marcus Endowment for Graduate Student Excellence was established.

== Awards and honors ==
In 1989, Marcus was elected a Fellow of the American Association for the Advancement of Science. In 2001, she won the Robert O. Lawton Distinguished Professor Award, the highest faculty award at FSU and was awarded the Mary Sears Professor of Oceanography. FSU established the Nancy Marcus Professorship in 2003. In 2004, she was elected a Fellow of the Association for Women in Science. In 2008, Marcus was honored with the establishment of the Nancy Marcus Professorship by an anonymous donor due to her efforts in increasing numbers of under-represented students in science. In 2014, the main auditorium of the FSU of Honors, Scholars, and Fellows House was named the Nancy H. Marcus Great Hall.

== Selected works ==
=== Books ===
- Ennis, Christine Ann; Marcus, Nancy H. (1996). Biological Consequences of Global Climate Change. University Science Books. ISBN 978-0935702859.
- Lee, Cheng-Sheng; O'Bryen, Patricia J.; Marcus, Nancy H. (2008). Copepods in Aquaculture. John Wiley & Sons. ISBN 978-0470276303.

=== Journal articles ===
- Marcus, Nancy H. (January 3, 1984). "Recruitment of copepod nauplii into the plankton: importance of diapause eggs and benthic processes". Marine Ecology Progress Series. 15 (1–2): 47–54. Bibcode:1984MEPS...15...47M. doi:10.3354/meps015047. JSTOR 24815920.
- Marcus, Nancy H.; Lutz, Robert; Burnett, Wiliam; Cable, Peter (January 1994). "Age, viability, and vertical distribution of zooplankton resting eggs from an anoxic basin: Evidence of an egg bank". Limnology and Oceanography. 39 (1): 154–158. Bibcode:1994LimOc..39..154M. doi:10.4319/lo.1994.39.1.0154.
- Marcus, Nancy H. (March 1996). "Ecological and evolutionary significance of resting eggs in marine copepods: past, present, and future studies". Hydrobiologia. 320 (1–3): 141–152. Bibcode:1996HyBio.320..141M. doi:10.1007/BF00016815. S2CID 24961184.
- Marcus, Nancy H. (July 1998). "Minireview: The importance of benthic-pelagic coupling and the forgotten role of life cycles in coastal aquatic systems". Limnology and Oceanography. 43 (5): 763–768. Bibcode:1998LimOc..43..763M. doi:10.4319/lo.1998.43.5.0763.
- Marcus, Nancy H. (March 2005). "Oceanography, Science, and Academia: Women Making a Difference". Oceanography. 18 (1): 51–55. Bibcode:2005Ocgpy..18a..51M. doi:10.5670/oceanog.2005.71.

== See also ==
- LGBT people in science

Academic offices
| Preceded by Dianne F. Harrison | Dean of the Florida State University Graduate School; 2005–2017 | Succeeded by Mark Riley |
| Preceded by | Director of the Florida State University Marine Laboratory; 1989–2001 | Succeeded by |
