= Cecile Reynaud =

American volleyball coach (born 1953)

Personal information
- Born: August 1953 (age 73); Sioux City, Iowa, U.S.
- Hometown: Tallahassee, Florida U.S.
- Education: Missouri State University; Florida State University

Coaching information
- Current team: Retired from coaching, currently a clinician
Previous teams coached
Years	Teams
1976-2001; 1985	Florida State University Head Coach; USAV Junior National Team

Best results
Years	Location	Result
1983; 1985; 1986; 1987; 1988; 1989; 1992; 1994; 1998; 2001	Metro Conference Championships; Metro Conference Championships; Metro Conference Championships; Metro Conference Championships; Metro Conference Championships; Metro Conference Championships; ACC Championships; ACC Championships; ACC Championships; ACC Championships	1st 1st 1st 1st 1st 1st 2nd 2nd 1st 2nd
- Last updated: June 6, 2007

Cecile Reynaud (born August 1953) is an American volleyball educator and retired coach of the Florida State Lady Seminoles volleyball team. After her retirement from coaching she was an associate professor with the sport management program at Florida State University until August 2015. She also served as an interim assistant athletic director and senior women's administrator at Florida State University from 1994-95. She has served as a television color analyst for collegiate volleyball matches on ACCN, Fox Sports Net South, Sunshine Network and ESPN.

She retired from coaching with over 650 wins. She is a past president of the American Volleyball Coaches Association. She is also a past chair of the board for USA Volleyball. She is currently working as the Vice President of Volleyball Operations for the Major League Volleyball (2022-present). Reynaud is a member of the USA Volleyball Foundation Board of Directors (2022-present).

A 1975 graduate of Missouri State University, Reynaud enjoyed an outstanding athletic career on the volleyball team and was twice named among the Outstanding College Athletes in America. In 1983, she was inducted into the school's Women's Athletics Hall of Fame. Reynaud added "Dr." to her name in the spring of 1998 after completing her doctorate degree in athletic administration at Florida State.

== Coaching ==
=== Florida State University ===
As a coach, Reynaud has surpassed many milestones in her 26-year tenure at Florida State. Coach Reynaud notched her 500th career victory in the first match of the 1994 season against Southern Illinois University, placing her among an elite list of coaches in the 500 win club. She reached win number 550 in a three-set win at Florida Atlantic University in 1997 as she led the Lady Seminoles to the program's best ever start at 12-0, and her 600th win over Clemson.

Post season play was familiar to the Lady Seminoles over 26 seasons of volleyball. Florida State (FSU) made 10 NCAA post-season appearances. At the conference level, FSU made three appearances in the Atlantic Coast Conference Championship game in eight years of ACC competition, earning FSU its first ACC crown in 1998. Prior to joining the Atlantic Coast Conference (ACC) in 1992, Reynaud and the Lady Seminoles claimed six regular-season titles and five tournament titles in Metro Conference play from 1976 to 1991. Reynaud's teams have competed in 10 NCAA Tournaments, including eight post-season trips during her last 14 years in the position.

During her 26 years at Florida State, the volleyball program has also boasted one of the highest graduation rates within the athletic department. Among four-year letter winners, all but two student-athletes earned their college degrees while playing for Reynaud. This accounts for nearly 98 percent of all volleyball student-athletes over those 26 years. Reynaud's Seminoles also earned the prestigious Director's Cup for Service, given annually to the athletic team that performs the most community service hours. The Lady Seminoles donated 636 hours of service to the community in 2000-01.

After her retirement from coaching Dr. Reynaud joined the FSU Sport Management faculty in 2002 and served as the academic advisor for all the master's students and taught 3-4 classes a semester until 2015 when she retired from the University after 39 years. She continues to teach one online graduate class a semester as an adjunct professor.

=== USA Volleyball ===
In 1983, Reynaud went to the international level and served as the assistant coach at the World University Games in Canada and in 1985 was head coach for the USAV Junior National Team which toured Japan and China. In 2012, she served as the team leader for the USA Women's National Sitting Volleyball Team at the Paralympic Games. In 2013, she was the team leader/assistant coach for the USA Women's National Team for the FIVB World Grand Prix with competition in Brazil, Serbia, and Japan. In 2014 she served as the team leader for the Men's USA Volleyball Team at the U21 World Championship in Mexico.

She served as a coordinator at the Olympic Festival for several years and participated in the 1990 Goodwill Games as the Technical Secretary. Highly respected among her peers, Reynaud's involvement in international competition was taken to an even higher level when she was chosen to serve at the Deputy Competition Manager for the 1996 Centennial Olympic Games in Atlanta, Georgia. As an expert of the game, Reynaud was co-editor of The Volleyball Coaching Bible, which has been heralded as one of the best volleyball coaching books to ever be written. She is the editor of The Volleyball Coaching Bible, Vol. 2 published in June 2015. She has produced numerous DVDs and other educational material pertaining to volleyball.

Reynaud is also a certified USA Volleyball Coaching Accreditation Program (CAP) instructor and conducts coaching clinics all over the United States. She also served as an FIVB Coach Clinician.

She is a past member of the USA Volleyball Board of Directors and serves on the NORCECA Coaches Commission.

=== Memberships ===
She has been on the American Volleyball Coaches Association (AVCA) All-America Committee and was the Zone Coordinator for 1986 and 1987 Olympic Festivals. She continued to serve as the commissioner for the Olympic Festival for several years. Reynaud is spent 12 years on the USVBA Board of Directors and Executive Committee previously and served a second time on the USA Volleyball Board of Directors.

Reynaud served as president of the AVCA in 1989 and 1990 after serving a two-year term as the awards chair in 1986 and 1987. She was again appointed to the AVCA Board of Directors overseeing Education and Publications for the association and served from 2005-2016. She has remained an active member of the AVCA, even after retirement from coaching. She presented annually at the convention as well as serving as emcee of the Tachikara/AVCA Coach of the Year and Victory Club Award Banquet and AVCA All-America/Players of the Year Banquet for numerous years. She served as President of the Alliance of Women Coaches (now WeCOACH) and was a member of the FSU Varsity Club Board of Directors as well as the Side-out Foundation Board of Directors. Locally she served as a Commissioner on the Tallahassee/Leon County Commission on the Status of Women and Girls. Dr. Reynaud also served as president of the Refuge House Board of Directors, a local domestic and sexual abuse shelter for 4 years and on the board for 10 years.

== Personal life ==
Reynaud married oceanographer and Graduate School Dean Nancy Marcus circa 1992. Dr. Marcus passed away in 2016. Reynaud was remarried in May, 2026 to Dr. Helen Levine of St. Petersburg, FL.

== Awards and accolades ==
=== As a player ===
- Outstanding College Athletes in America - 1973, 1975
- Southwest Missouri State University Women's Athletic Hall of Fame Inductee - 1983

=== As a coach ===
- Nominated as an Outstanding Woman in America - 1982
- Volleyball Coach of the Year by the Florida Association of Intercollegiate Athletics for Women - 1981
- Metro Conference Coach of the Year 1988, 1989
- American Volleyball Coaches Association South Region Coach of the Year - 1989
- ACC Coach of the Year - 1992, 2000
- George J. Fisher Leader in Volleyball by USA Volleyball - 1996
- St. Leo University Women in Sports Achievement Award - 2005
- Webster Groves High School Athletic Hall of Fame - 2006
- Florida State University Athletic Hall of Fame - 2009
- USA Volleyball Florida Region Hall of Fame - 2011
- USA Volleyball Harold T. Friermood "Frier" Award Winner - 2016
- Missouri State University "Bear of Excellence" Award Winner - 2017
- American Volleyball Coaches Association Hall of Fame - 2017
- USA Volleyball Bertha Lucas "All Time Great Coach" - 2020
- USA Volleyball Harry E. Wilson Distinguished Service Award – May 2020
- FSU Emeritus Alumni Society’s Dean Eyman Distinctive Service Award – August 2022
- USA Volleyball Founder's Award - 2022
- Tallahassee Trailblazer Legacy Award - 2024
- NCAA Coaches Academy Honorary Graduate - 2024
- Webster Groves High School Wall of Fame - 2025
- FSU Anne's College of Education Distinguished Alumni Award - 2026
- FSU Commencement Speaker - 2025

== Bibliography ==
=== Books ===
- Coaching Volleyball: Technical and Tactical Skills Publisher: Human Kinetics, Inc. (2011) ISBN 0736053840
- 101 Winning Volleyball Drills Publisher: Coaches Choice (2008) ISBN 9781585180837
- She Can Coach!' (Editor) Publisher: Human Kinetics, Inc. (2005) ISBN 0736052321
- The Volleyball Coaching Bible (Co-Editor) Publisher: Human Kinetics, Inc. (2002) ISBN 0736039678
- The Volleyball Coaching Bible, Vol. 2 (Editor) Publisher: Human Kinetics, Inc. (2015) ISBN 9781450491983
- Coach Education Essentials (Ch. 8 - College and High-Level Amateur Sports) Publisher: Human Kinetics, Inc. (2020) ISBN 9781492521075
- Winning Ways of Women Coaches (Editor) Publisher: Human Kinetics, Inc. (2022) ISBN 9781718203228

=== DVDs ===
- Coaches Choice Volleyball DVD Series
- 101 Winning Volleyball Drills Publisher: Coaches Choice
- 20 Keys to Great Defense Publisher: Coaches Choice
- Coaching Volleyball: Team Offense Publisher: Coaches Choice
- Coaching Volleyball: Team Defense Publisher: Coaches Choice
- Coaching Volleyball: Organizing and Conducting Practice Publisher: Coaches Choice
- Coaching Volleyball: Individual Defense Publisher: Coaches Choice
- Coaching Volleyball: Effective Practice Drills Publisher: Coaches Choice
- Coaching Individual Volleyball Skills and Techniques Publisher: Coaches Choice
- Reading and Decision Making in Volleyball Publisher: Championship Productions
