= Serie A1 1980–81 (men's volleyball) =

1980–81 Serie A1 was the thirty-sixth men's volleyball major Italian championship; it was won by Turin-based team Klippan, which got its third title in a row.

== Format ==
Twelve contestants took part in a simple round-robin tournament, earning two points for each win. In the end, the final chart-leading team won the title, while bottom two teams were relegated in the lower division.

== Teams ==
Team	City and Region	Venue	Seasons in major league	Map
Amaro Più Loreto	Loreto, Marche	Palasport	3	1980–81 Serie A1 team distribution
Carisparmio Ravenna	Ravenna, Emilia-Romagna	PalaCosta	14	1980–81 Serie A1 team distribution
Edilcuoghi Sassuolo	Sassuolo, Emilia-Romagna	Palasport, Modena	5	1980–81 Serie A1 team distribution
Latte Cigno Chieti	Chieti, Abruzzo	Piano Vincolato	1	1980–81 Serie A1 team distribution
Panini Modena	Modena, Emilia-Romagna	Palasport	13	1980–81 Serie A1 team distribution
Polenghi Milano	Milan, Lombardy	PalaLido	5	1980–81 Serie A1 team distribution
Radio CUS Pisa	Pisa, Tuscany	PalaCUS	8	1980–81 Serie A1 team distribution
Riccadonna Asti	Asti, Piedmont	Palasport	1	1980–81 Serie A1 team distribution
Robe di Kappa Torino	Turin, Piedmont	PalaRuffini	9	1980–81 Serie A1 team distribution
Santàl Parma	Parma, Emilia-Romagna	PalaRaschi	33	1980–81 Serie A1 team distribution
Torre Tabita Catania	Catania, Sicily	PalaSpedini	9	1980–81 Serie A1 team distribution
Toseroni Roma	Rome, Lazio	Palazzetto dello Sport	8	1980–81 Serie A1 team distribution

== Key dates ==
- 8 November 1980: opening day of the tournament. The defending champion, Robe di Kappa Torino (who enrolled Dimitar Zlatanov), easily defeated Radio CUS Pisa 3–0 (15–2, 15–1, 15–6), while its most accredited rival for the title, Santàl Parma, with newcomers Negri and Lanfranco), lost in Loreto 2–3 (15–8, 15–6, 7–15, 14–16, 13–15).
- 22 November 1980: Robe di Kappa defeated 3–1 Torre Tabita Catania, its rival during 1979–80 season and maintained the first place in the classification, along with Edilcuoghi Sassuolo, Polenghi Milano and Panini Modena (3:0); on the contrary, Torre Tabita was occupying last place (0:3).
- 10 December 1980: Edilcuoghi lost its first match (0–3 in Rome), while Robe di Kappa beat Panini Modena 3–1 away (9–15, 15–11, 15–11, 15–13) and reached the solitary top of the chart (6:0).
- 24 January 1981: winning also on Edilcuoghi's ground 3–1 (4–15, 14–16, 11–15, 6–15) Robe di Kappa (11:0) was firmly maintaining the top of the chart after the first half of the season. Panini Modena was occupying the second place (9:2).
- 21 February 1981: Robe di Kappa beat Toseroni Roma 3–0 (15–7, 15–8, 15–10) and, after 15 rounds, was full score with 30 points, 4 more than Panini (second place) and 10 more than Toseroni and Santàl (third place).
- 7 March 1981: defeating runner-up Panini Modena 3–0 at Palaruffini, Robe di Kappa extend its advantage in the league table to 8 points.
- 21 March 1981: Robe di Kappa knocked off Amaro Più Loreto 3–0 (15–7, 15–9, 15–10) and won its third title in a row with 3 matches still to play.
- 11 April 1981: in the last round, Robe di Kappa beat Edilcuoghi 3–1 (6–15, 15–11, 15–3, 15–2) and closed its tournament unbeaten, with a 22:0 score (fifteen matches won 3–0 and seven 3–1); Torre Tabita was unpredictably relegated.

== League table ==
Pos	Team	Pld	W	L	Pts	SW	SL	SR	SPW	SPL	SPR	Qualification or relegation
1	Robe di Kappa Torino	22	22	0	44	66	7	9.429	1050	600	1.750	1980–81 Champion
2	Panini Modena	22	17	5	34	56	24	2.333	1085	771	1.407	
3	Toseroni Roma	22	15	7	30	49	32	1.531	986	909	1.085	
4	Santàl Parma	22	14	8	28	51	35	1.457	1047	935	1.120	
5	Edilcuoghi Sassuolo	22	13	9	26	47	39	1.205	1077	974	1.106	
6	Polenghi Milano	22	11	11	22	45	37	1.216	1037	960	1.080	
7	Amaro Più Loreto	22	11	11	22	41	41	1.000	970	981	0.989	
8	Riccadonna Asti	22	10	12	20	34	43	0.791	944	974	0.969	
9	Carisparmio Ravenna	22	9	13	18	37	49	0.755	984	1043	0.943	
10	Latte Cigno Chieti	22	6	16	12	25	51	0.490	789	983	0.803	
11	Torre Tabita Catania	22	4	18	8	24	56	0.429	786	1050	0.749	Relegated in Serie A2
12	Radio CUS Pisa	22	0	22	0	5	66	0.076	484	1040	0.465	Relegated in Serie A2

== Results ==
Home \ Away	TOR	MOD	ROM	PAR	SAS	MIL	LOR	AST	RAV	CHI	CAT	PIS
Robe di Kappa Torino		3–0	3–0	3–0	3–1	3–0	3–0	3–0	3–0	3–1	3–1	3–0
Panini Modena	1–3		3–0	3–1	1–3	3–0	3–0	3–0	3–0	3–1	3–0	3–0
Toseroni Roma	0–3	3–1		3–1	3–0	3–2	3–0	3–0	3–2	3–0	3–0	3–0
Santàl Parma	0–3	2–3	2–3		1–3	3–1	3–0	3–0	3–1	3–1	3–0	3–0
Edilcuoghi Sassuolo	1–3	3–2	3–1	1–3		3–2	3–1	3–1	3–2	3–0	3–0	3–0
Polenghi Milano	0–3	1–3	3–1	1–3	3–1		1–3	1–3	3–0	3–0	3–0	3–0
Amaro Più Loreto	1–3	1–3	3–0	3–2	1–3	1–3		3–0	3–1	3–0	3–1	3–0
Riccadonna Asti	0–3	0–3	2–3	0–3	3–1	3–2	3–2		3–0	3–0	3–1	3–0
Carisparmio Ravenna	1–3	1–3	3–2	0–3	3–2	1–3	3–1	3–1		3–1	3–0	3–1
Latte Cigno Chieti	0–3	0–3	1–3	1–3	3–0	0–3	1–3	0–3	3–1		3–1	3–0
Torre Tabita Catania	0–3	1–3	0–3	2–3	3–1	0–3	2–3	3–0	2–3	1–3		3–0
Radio CUS Pisa	0–3	1–3	0–3	2–3	0–3	0–3	0–3	0–3	0–3	0–3	1–3	

Legend: Blue = home team win; Yellow = draw; Red = away team win.

== Bibliography ==
- La Stampa, years 1980 and 1981.
- Grassia, Filippo; Palmigiano, Claudio (1986). Almanacco Illustrato del Volley 1987 [Illustrated Digest of Volleyball 1987] (in Italian) (1st ed.). Modena, Italy: Panini.

Preceded by 1979–80	Serie A1	Succeeded by 1981–82
