= Evernew =

Evernew may refer to:

- Evernew Studios, Pakistani film studio
- Evernew Pictures, Pakistani film production and distribution company
- Evernew (company), Japanese manufacturer of outdoor and sports equipment
