= Silvano Prandi =

Italian volleyball coach (born 1947)

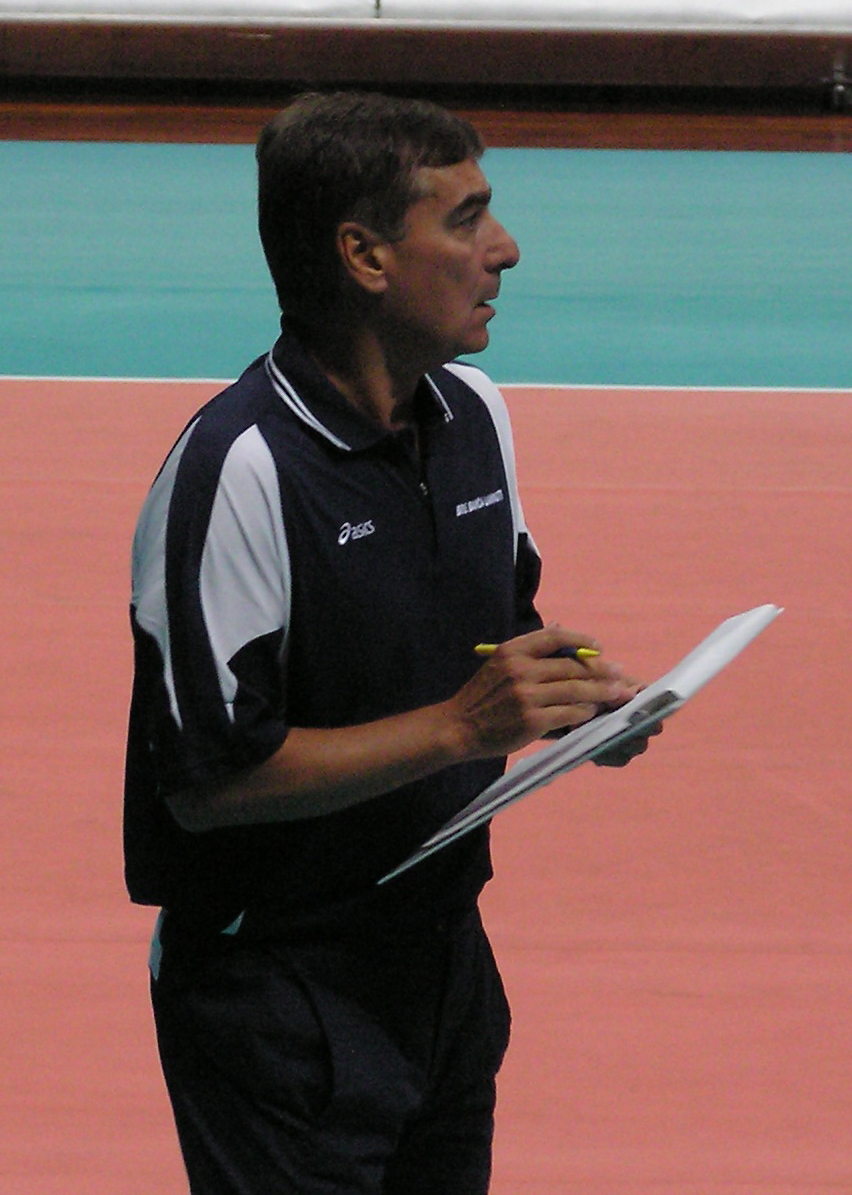
Silvano Prandi 2006

Silvano Prandi (born 13 November 1947, in San Benedetto Belbo) is an Italian volleyball coach, currently the head coach of Chaumont Volley-Ball 52. In 1980, his men's professional team, CUS Torino Pallavolo, won the European Champions League. He was the head coach of the Italy men's national volleyball team from 1982-1986, during which he won the Bronze medal at the 1984 Olympics in Los Angeles, California. He was also the head coach of the Bulgaria men's national volleyball team from 2008-2010 and from 2019-2022.
