= Susan Cerulean =

American naturalist and writer

- Education: University of Florida
- Writing career
- Genre: Non-fiction
- Subject: Environment

Susan Cerulean is an American naturalist and writer. She authored a book about environmental issues facing swallow-tailed kites and wrote about environmental issues in her memoir, Coming to Pass.

== Biography ==
She has a bachelor’s degree in biology from Eckerd College and received a master's degree in horticulture from the University of Florida. She worked for an environmental organization and then as a lobbyist for environmental group in Tallahassee before taking a position with the Florida Fish and Wildlife Conservation Commission (FFWCC). Her projects with the state agency included the development of a Florida Wildlife Viewing Guide.

WFSU's Tom Flanagan described her as "one of North Florida's most celebrated nature writers."

Her husband is oceanographer Jeff Chanton.

== Selected works ==
- I Have Been Assigned the Single Bird: A Daughter’s Memoir (2020)
- Coming to Pass: Florida's Coastal Islands in a Gulf of Change University of Georgia Press (2015)
- Tracking Desire: A Journey After Swallow-Tailed Kites, University of Georgia Press (2005)
