= Jeff Chanton =

American oceanographer and academic

Jeffrey Paul Chanton
- Education: New College of Florida, University of North Carolina at Chapel Hill
- Spouse: Susan Cerulean
- Children: 3
- Awards: 2018. Tallahassee Scientific Society Gold Metal; 2017. Robert O. Lawton Distinguished Professor; 2017. Guardian of the Flame Award for Service to Florida State University; 2015. Fellow, American Geophysical Union.; 2015. Top 10 Water Analysis and Environmental Papers (Environmental Science and Technology’s most significant papers of the last 18 months), for Chanton et al., 2015.; 2014. Transformation through Teaching, FSU Spiritual Life Project.; 2009. Editor’s citation for outstanding reviewer, Limnology and Oceanography.; 2008. William H. Patrick Jr. Memorial Lecturer at the Soil Science Society of America Annual Meeting, Houston, TX; 2006. Distinguished Research Professor Award, Florida State University
- Scientific career
- Fields: Oceanography
- Workplaces: Florida State University
- Thesis: Sulfur mass balance and isotopic fractionation in an anoxic marine sediment (1985)

Jeffrey Paul "Jeff" Chanton is the 2017-2018 Robert O. Lawton Distinguished Professor and John Widmer Winchester professor of oceanography at Florida State University. His research interests include Arctic methane release from the thawing of permafrost. Chanton co-created the Master of Science in aquatic environmental sciences at FSU with Nancy Marcus.

== Life ==
Chanton is a native of the Gulf Coast of the US and has lived in Louisiana, Mississippi, Florida and North Carolina.

== Work ==
Chanton has conducted research in a variety of areas:

1. Permafrost Decomposition in the Arctic

2. Wetlands-- peatland Carbon cycling in northern high latitudes and tropical systems

3. Using Radiocarbon to determine the fate of Deep Water Horizon Oil and Gas

4. Food webs-- trophic relationships in estuaries

5. Reducing methane emissions to the atmosphere, designing landfill cover soils, which promote the growth of methane-consuming bacteria

6. Seeking solutions to allow large scale beneficial reuse of residual screen material, a by product of recycling facilities and a product containing gypsum, or calcium sulfate

7. Sulfur cycling in marine sediments and sulfur isotopes as an indicator of the strength of sulfate reduction

8. Methane gas hydrates, which some estimate may be a large reservoir of fossil fuel to be mined

9. Groundwater discharge, an overlooked process which is important to the nutrient budgets of coastal waters

10. Nutrient inputs to aquifers from septic tank discharge, groundwater tracing.

He has supervised or co-supervised 20 PhD dissertations, 22 Thesis MS degrees, 42 capstone project based MS degrees, and 12 Baccalaureate Theses

== Awards ==
In 2005 Chanton received an Aldo Leopold Fellowship Award. The Leopold Leadership Program advances environmental decision-making by providing academic scientists with the skills and connections needed to be effective leaders and communicators. He received intensive training to better communicate the science associated with complex environmental issues to the media, policy makers, business leaders and non-scientists. In 2005 he received an award as the Florida Wildlife Federation Conservation Communicator of the Year. He has given multiple presentations to elected officials, their delegates, and the public on the science of climate change, sea level change and the oil spill. Chanton was one of 10 scientists who responded to Governor Rick Scott’s (Florida) statement that “he was not a scientist” and thus could not respond to questions about climate. With other scientists, he met with the governor as well as his democratic challenger, former governor Charlie Crist. He gave a number of interviews including “Here and Now” on national public radio. He also has given presentations to the Secretaries of the Florida Department of Environmental Protection.
