= Serie A1 1979–80 (men's volleyball) =

1979–80 Serie A1 was the thirty-fifth men's volleyball major Italian championship; it was won by Turin-based team Klippan, which won its second title in a row.

== Format ==
Twelve contestants took part to a simple round-robin tournament, earning two points for each win. In the end, the final chart-leading team won the title, while bottom two teams were relegated in the lower division.

== Teams ==
| Team | City and Region | Venue | Seasons in major league | Map |
|---|---|---|---|---|
| Amaro Più Loreto | Loreto, Marche | | 2 | 1979–80 Serie A1 team distribution |
| Edilcuoghi Sassuolo | Sassuolo, Emilia-Romagna | Palasport, Modena | 4 | 1979–80 Serie A1 team distribution |
| Eldorado Roma | Rome, Lazio | Palazzetto dello Sport | 7 | 1979–80 Serie A1 team distribution |
| Grondplast Ravenna | Ravenna, Emilia-Romagna | PalaCosta | 13 | 1979–80 Serie A1 team distribution |
| Isea Falconara | Falconara Marittima, Marche | Palasport | 2 | 1979–80 Serie A1 team distribution |
| Klippan Torino | Turin, Piedmont | PalaRuffini | 8 | 1979–80 Serie A1 team distribution |
| Mazzei Pisa | Pisa, Tuscany | PalaCUS | 7 | 1979–80 Serie A1 team distribution |
| Panini Modena | Modena, Emilia-Romagna | Palasport | 12 | 1979–80 Serie A1 team distribution |
| Paoletti Catania | Catania, Sicily | PalaSpedini | 8 | 1979–80 Serie A1 team distribution |
| Polenghi Milano | Milan, Lombardy | PalaLido | 4 | 1979–80 Serie A1 team distribution |
| Sai Marcolin Belluno | Belluno, Veneto | Palasport, Longarone | 1 | 1979–80 Serie A1 team distribution |
| Veico Parma | Parma, Emilia-Romagna | PalaRaschi | 32 | 1979–80 Serie A1 team distribution |

== Key dates ==
- 14 November 1979: in the opening match of the season, Klippan Torino beat Grondplast Ravenna 3–1 at PalaRuffini; the other matches of the 1st round were played on Saturday 17 November. Klippan was the defending champion, while Sai Marcolin Belluno and Isea Falconara were the new-promoted teams.
- 11 December 1979: in Catania, Paoletti defeats Klippan 3–0 (15–6, 15–12, 15–11) and reaches the solitary top of the chart with a remarkable 6:0 score. Klippan (5:1) was sharing the second position along with Veico Parma (5:1), which lost its first match to Amaro Più Loreto (1–3) in the same day.
- 5 January 1980: Paoletti Catania broke its winning run losing 0–3 to Edilcuoghi Sassuolo (12–15, 3–15, 18–20); defeating Panini Modena, Veico Parma reached Paoletti on the top of the chart with an 8:1 score, while Klippan, which lost 1–3 to troubled Polenghi Milano, was third with 7:2.
- 16 January 1980: winning in Ravenna 3–1, Paoletti ended the first half of the season at first place of the league table (10:1). Veico, who lost its last two matches to Paoletti and Klippan (both 0–3) fell at third place (8:3), surpassed by Klippan (9:2).
- 2 February 1980: Paoletti lost 1–3 away to Mazzei Pisa and got caught by Klippan, which defeated Sai Marcolin Belluno 1–3. The score of the two teams was 12:2; Panini Modena and Veico Parma were sharing third place (10:4).
- 23 February 1980: in Turin, Klippan knocked off Paoletti 3–1 (15–4, 15–11, 6–15, 15–2) and remained alone on the top of the chart (15:2 vs. 14:3).
- 22 March 1980: beating Edilcuoghi Sassuolo 3–1 away (15–10, 15–4, 8–15, 15–2, match played in Modena), Klippan won the second title of its history, having six points of advantage than Paoletti Catania and Veico Parma, with only one match left to play. On March 19, in the final day, Klippan defeated even Veico, (13th win-in-a-row) and closed its tournament with a 20:2 score.

== League table ==
| Pos | Team | Pld | W | L | Pts | SW | SL | SR | SPW | SPL | SPR | Qualification or relegation |
|---|---|---|---|---|---|---|---|---|---|---|---|---|
| 1 | Klippan Torino | 22 | 20 | 2 | 40 | 61 | 15 | 4.067 | 1063 | 657 | 1.618 | 1979–80 Champion |
| 2 | Paoletti Catania | 22 | 17 | 5 | 34 | 56 | 23 | 2.435 | 1071 | 895 | 1.197 | |
| 3 | Panini Modena | 22 | 15 | 7 | 30 | 53 | 27 | 1.963 | 1057 | 922 | 1.146 | |
| 4 | Veico Parma | 22 | 15 | 7 | 30 | 50 | 36 | 1.389 | 1112 | 981 | 1.134 | |
| 5 | Amaro Più Loreto | 22 | 13 | 9 | 26 | 45 | 34 | 1.324 | 1052 | 903 | 1.165 | |
| 6 | Edilcuoghi Sassuolo | 22 | 13 | 9 | 26 | 50 | 40 | 1.250 | 1135 | 1054 | 1.077 | |
| 7 | Mazzei Pisa | 22 | 11 | 11 | 22 | 39 | 43 | 0.907 | 957 | 1050 | 0.911 | |
| 8 | Polenghi Milano | 22 | 8 | 14 | 16 | 37 | 52 | 0.712 | 1059 | 1138 | 0.931 | |
| 9 | Eldorado Roma | 22 | 8 | 14 | 16 | 34 | 51 | 0.667 | 967 | 1137 | 0.850 | |
| 10 | Grondplast Ravenna | 22 | 6 | 16 | 12 | 32 | 54 | 0.593 | 964 | 1134 | 0.850 | |
| 11 | Sai Marcolin Belluno | 22 | 3 | 19 | 6 | 22 | 60 | 0.367 | 864 | 1121 | 0.771 | Relegated in Serie A2 |
| 12 | Isea Falconara | 22 | 3 | 19 | 6 | 15 | 60 | 0.250 | 710 | 1061 | 0.669 | Relegated in Serie A2 |

== Results ==
| Home \ Away | TOR | CAT | MOD | PAR | LOR | SAS | PIS | MIL | ROM | RAV | BEL | FAL |
|---|---|---|---|---|---|---|---|---|---|---|---|---|
| Klippan Torino | | 3–0 | 3–1 | 3–1 | 3–0 | 3–1 | 3–1 | 3–0 | 3–0 | 3–1 | 3–0 | 3–0 |
| Paoletti Catania | 3–0 | | 3–0 | 3–0 | 3–0 | 3–1 | 3–0 | 3–0 | 3–0 | 3–0 | 3–0 | 3–0 |
| Panini Modena | 1–3 | 2–3 | | 2–3 | 3–1 | 3–0 | 3–0 | 3–1 | 3–0 | 3–0 | 3–0 | 3–0 |
| Veico Parma | 0–3 | 3–1 | 3–1 | | 3–0 | 1–3 | 3–1 | 3–0 | 3–1 | 3–2 | 3–0 | 3–0 |
| Amaro Più Loreto | 0–3 | 1–3 | 3–1 | 3–1 | | 3–2 | 3–0 | 3–1 | 3–0 | 3–0 | 3–0 | 3–0 |
| Edilcuoghi Sassuolo | 1–3 | 3–0 | 0–3 | 2–3 | 3–1 | | 3–0 | 3–1 | 3–2 | 3–2 | 3–1 | 3–0 |
| Mazzei Pisa | 0–3 | 3–1 | 0–3 | 1–3 | 3–1 | 3–2 | | 3–2 | 2–3 | 3–2 | 3–0 | 3–0 |
| Polenghi Milano | 3–1 | 3–2 | 1–3 | 3–2 | 3–2 | 0–3 | 2–3 | | 2–3 | 1–3 | 3–2 | 3–0 |
| Eldorado Roma | 0–3 | 2–3 | 2–3 | 0–3 | 0–3 | 2–3 | 0–3 | 3–0 | | 3–2 | 3–0 | 3–0 |
| Grondplast Ravenna | 0–3 | 1–3 | 0–3 | 2–3 | 1–3 | 3–2 | 3–1 | 0–3 | 0–3 | | 3–0 | 3–0 |
| Sai Marcolin Belluno | 1–3 | 2–3 | 1–3 | 2–3 | 0–3 | 2–3 | 0–3 | 3–2 | 2–3 | 3–1 | | 3–0 |
| Isea Falconara | 0–3 | 1–3 | 0–3 | 3–0 | 1–3 | 1–3 | 0–3 | 1–3 | 3–1 | 2–3 | 3–2 | |

Legend: Blue = home team win; Yellow = draw; Red = away team win.

== Bibliography ==
- La Stampa, years 1979 and 1980.
- Grassia, Filippo; Palmigiano, Claudio (1986). Almanacco Illustrato del Volley 1987 [Illustrated Digest of Volleyball 1987] (in Italian) (1st ed.). Modena, Italy: Panini.

| Preceded by 1978–79 | Serie A1 | Succeeded by 1980–81 |
