= Snow Peak (company) =

Japanese camping equipment manufacturer

Snow Peak, Inc.
- Snow Peak logo (1999–present)

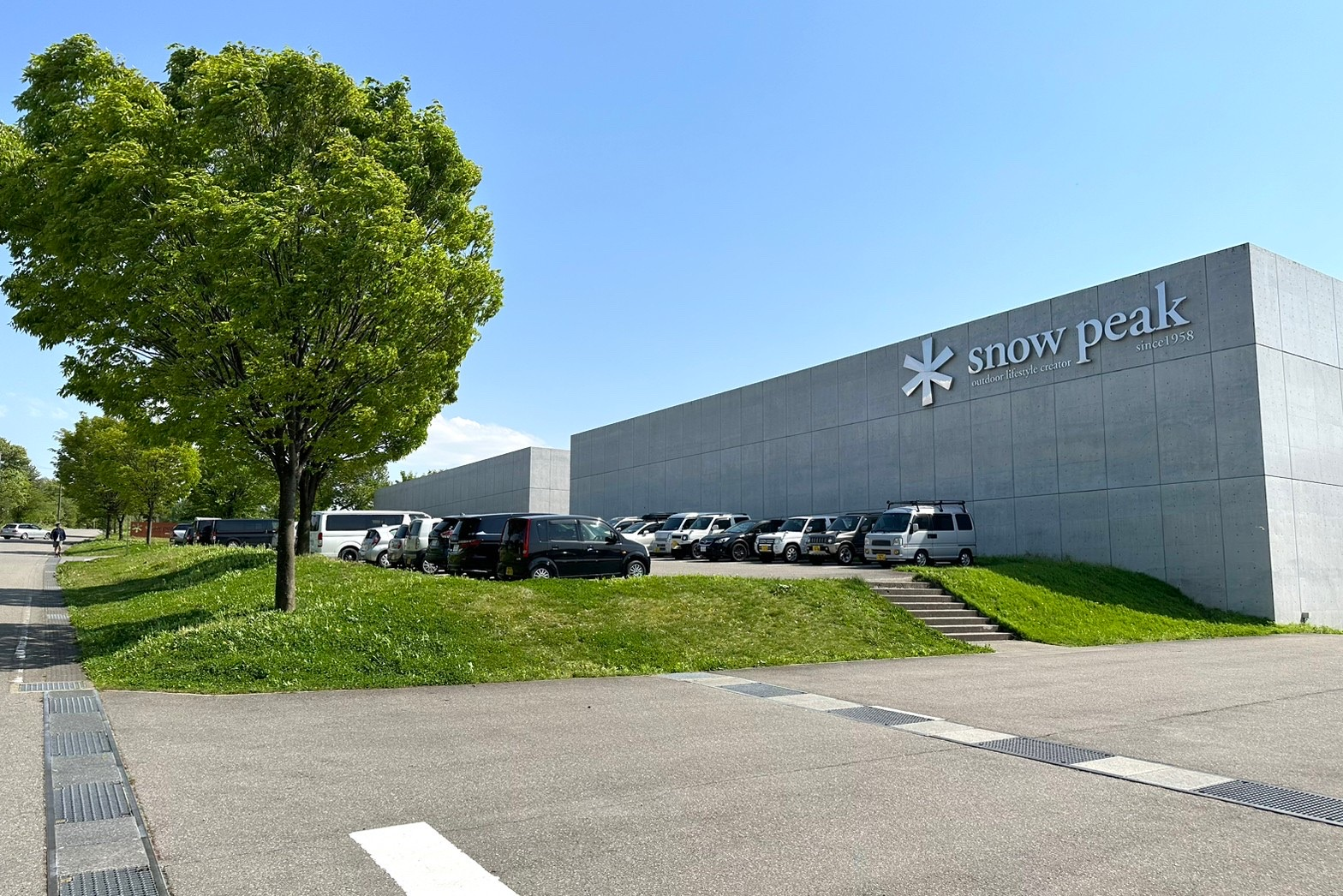
- The Snow Peak Headquarters building in 2023
- Type: Private K.K.
- Industry: Outdoor recreation
- Founded: Incorporated 1964; 62 years ago
- Founder: Yamai Yukio (山井 幸雄)
- Headquarters: Sanjō, Niigata, Japan
- Key people: Yamai Tōru (山井 太), President and CEO
- Products: Camping gear and outdoor gear
- Number of employees: 437 (est.)
- Website: www.snowpeak.co.jp

Snow Peak, Inc. (株式会社スノーピーク, Sunōpīku) is a Japanese manufacturer of high-end camping and hiking equipment.

The company's name has been rendered in kango form as Seppō (雪峰), and fans have abbreviated it as Snopy (スノピ, Sunopi).

== History ==
Snow Peak was founded by Yamai Yukio in 1958 as a local forge under the name Yamai shōten (山井商店). The company's first foray into outdoor equipment were experimental models of crampons and pitons made of inox steel and titanium. The "Snow Peak" brand name was established in 1963, the peak in question being Mount Tanigawa, a popular destination for Japanese mountaineers.

Snow Peak sells isobutane fuel under the Giga Power (ギガパワー) brand. In 2014, Snow Peak introduced an apparel line. In 2017, the Jūbako (住箱) portable prefabricated home designed by Snow Peak in collaboration with Kuma Kengo won the Japan Institute of Design Promotion's Good Design Award.

The company has opened stores in the United States, with locations in Portland and Brooklyn, with another set to open in Seattle.

== Notable products ==
- GS-100 "Chi" (地; lit. 'Ground') - portable stove fuelled by replaceable isobutane canisters. Later GS-100A version includes a piezoelectric push-button igniter.
- SCS-101 "Wapper" (ワッパ) - aluminium ultralight mess tin in the shape of a traditional magewappa box. Capable of fitting one standard-diameter isobutane canister. (discontinued)
- SCS-004 "Taku" (焚; lit. 'Campfire') - aluminium ultralight mess tin with internal lining of Sumiflon (スミフロン) fluoropolymer-aluminium composite licensed from Sumitomo Electric. Sumiflon is far more stable than Teflon, but will still pyrolysize when heated to above 300 °C and thereupon release toxic fumes. Later titanium models like the SCS-004T "Kyoku" (極; lit. 'Apex') are structurally identical but do not include Sumiflon. (discontinued)
- N-110 "Hifukibō" (火吹き棒) - steel blowpipe with reflux valve baffle preventing accidental smoke inhalation.

== See also ==
- Evernew (company)
