= Avia Pervia Modena =

Avia Pervia Modena was a 20th century men's volleyball club from the city of Modena.

== History ==
The club began in 1947 when Professor Franco Modena Anderlini gathered a group of students, including Odone Federzoni, and Unione Sportiva Ferrari. In 1951 and 1952 Avia Pervia took part in the national championship. Also in 1952, the Ferrari was absorbed by the Circolo Sportivo Avia Pervia (the motto engraved on the coat of arms of the city of Modena), also attended by the tenor Luciano Pavarotti. In subsequent years Avia Pervia, led again by Anderlini, contested the league championship with two other Modena clubs, the Minelli and Villa d'Oro. Of the eleven consecutive titles won by companies of the Emilian city, five were won by Avia Pervia (1957, 1959, 1960, 1962, 1962–1963). After a second-place finish at the end of the 1963–1964 season Avia Pervia, disappeared due to an economic crisis. by Benito entrepreneurs and Giuseppe Panini and considering descending Avia.

== Honours & achievements ==
Italian League

- Winners (5): 1957, 1959, 1960, 1962, 1962–1963
- Runners-up (4): 1954, 1958, 1961, 1963–1964
