= Robur Ravenna =

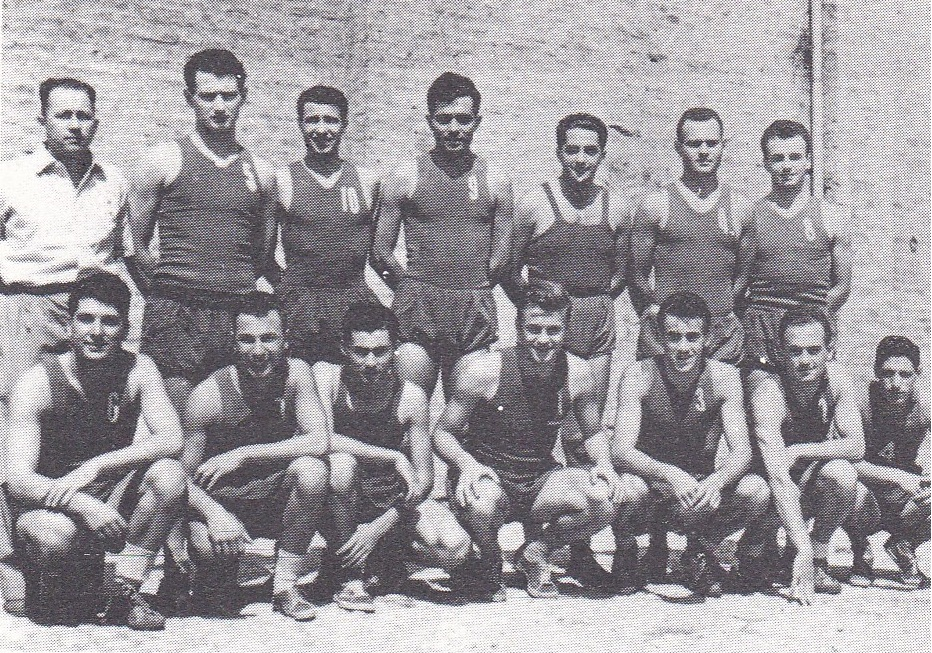
Robur Ravenna, c.1952

Robur Ravenna was an Italian men's volleyball club based in Ravenna. Robur was in business from 1946 to 2006.

== History ==
Gruppo Sportivo Robur was born in 1905 in Ravenna; It was established in 1946, started by Angelo Costa - who was among the other coach of the Italian national team between 1947 and 1949 - the section of men's volleyball, which took part, in 1946, the first Italian championship, graduating Campione d ' Italy. The club with blue and white colors, sewed the Scudetto on their jerseys for the next three years (1947, 1948 and 1949) and in 1952. In 1954 Robur renounced his participation in the national championship. In the following decades he devoted himself the youth activities, working closely with the team of the Fire Department, the Casadio; in 1964 he won the Junior Under 20 championship's return to Serie A of the first team in the 1964–65 and 1965–66 seasons, was stingy of successes. In the same period the basketball team he served for several years in the Serie B.

In the seventies and eighties-nineties the activity was absent or conducted only at amateur level - regional.

In the years after 2000, after the downsizing of the Porto Ravenna Volley, volleyball in Ravenna was in danger of disappearing; in 2006 the company, together with the AS Angelo Costa Ravenna, create a new team called Gruppo Sportivo Robur Angelo Costa: the Robur Ravenna then ceases to exist.

== Honours & achievements ==
Italian League

- Winners (5): 1946, 1947, 1948, 1949, 1952
- Runners-up (2): 1950, 1951
