= Ruini Firenze =

Gruppo Sportivo Vigili del Fuoco Otello Ruini (Ruini Firenze) is a sports club of the Fire Department of Florence, Italy.

The club is best known for its volleyball teams. It also participates in rowing, wrestling, skiing, kickboxing.

== History ==
Ruini Firenze was started on 17 September 1962, on the initiative of the Fire Department of Florence. It was named after Otello Ruini, a firefighter who died in 1958,. A few months after its establishment, the club absorbed l'Alce ("the Moose"), a Florentine club in series A volleyball This gave Ruini Firenze the chance to play in the national championship.

Led by Aldo Bellagambi, Ruini Firenze became a major volleyball club in Italy, winning five league titles (1963–64, 1964–65, 1967–68, 1970–71, 1972–73). After the relegation of 1974-75, the team experienced a rapid decline, which led to the abandonment of volleyball in 1980.

Ruini Firenze currently plays in amateur categories in Tuscany, In the 2007-2008 season, the volleyball team earned a promotion to series C.. The following season (2008-2009) Ruini Firenze reached the playoffs for promotion to B2, but did not succeed in boarding.

== Honours ==
- Italian Volleyball League titles: 1963-64, 1964–65, 1967–68, 1970–71, 1972–73
- CEV Champions League for volleyball runners-up (1): 1971-72
