= Mikasa Sports =

Japanese sports equipment and athletic goods company

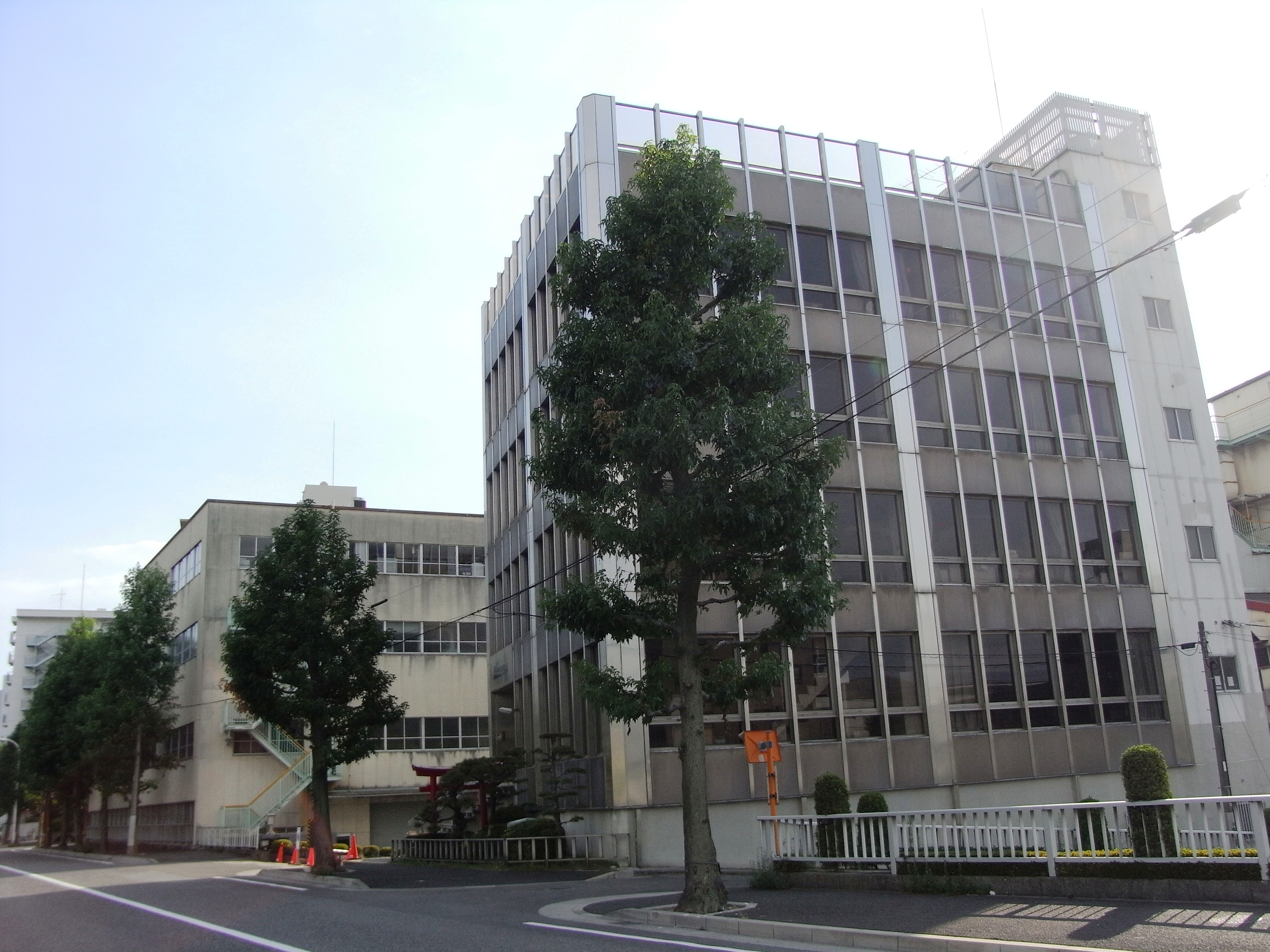
- Mikasa headquarters in Nishi-ku
- Type: Kabushiki Kaisha (share company)
- Industry: Sports Equipment
- Predecessor: Masuda Rubber Industries, Myojyo Rubber Industrial Co.
- Founded: May 1, 1917; 109 years ago
- Founder: Masutaro Masuda
- Headquarters: Hiroshima, Chūgoku, Japan
- Key people: Yuji Saeki (President)
- Products: Sports balls, accessories
- Revenue: ¥6.5 billion (2010)
- Total assets: ¥120 million (2016)
- Number of employees: 139 (2016)
- Website: mikasasports.co.jp

Mikasa Corporation (Japanese: 株式会社 ミカサ, Hepburn: Kabushiki Kaisha Mikasa) is a Japanese sports equipment and athletic goods company with its international corporate headquarters located in Nishi-ku, Hiroshima, Chūgoku. Specializing in equipment for ball games, the balls manufactured by Mikasa for sports football, Korfball, basketball, volleyball, waterpolo and handball are often used for official matches, games and competitions.

Most notably, Mikasa volleyballs are the official balls for all Fédération Internationale de Volleyball (International Volleyball Federation) worldwide competitions, and numerous domestic leagues. Mikasa volleyballs are the official ball for the Olympics.

== History ==
Mikasa was founded in 1917 as the Hiroshima Gomu Corporation ("Hiroshima Rubber Corporation"). The company began its life producing many different types of rubber products, such as flip-flops and dodgeballs. It began using the Mikasa brand name on its sports products in 1935, and in the early 1940s was consolidated with a number of rival rubber companies. Following World War II, the company grew rapidly: Mikasa volleyballs made their Olympic debut at the 1964 Tokyo Olympics, and in the 1970s the company began to expand globally. Since 1980, Mikasa has also produced the official Olympic water polo ball.

In the 2000s, Mikasa was faced with allegations of labor violations in some factories in Thailand. The ITUC published a report alleging anti-labor campaigns by company management. The report detailed allegations of unethical labor practices such as the penalization of union leaders and labor organizers via discriminatory transfers and unjust disciplinary procedures. The ITUC argued that Mikasa succeeded in either forcing the resignation of most of the factory's union committee in an affront to the right of its employees to organize. The Thai Labor Campaign alleged that new Mikasa factory workers received only 173 baht per day. (equivalent to $4.36 per day in 2006)

== Products ==
Mikasa makes many different types of balls, including goods for basketball, beach and indoor volleyball, football, rugby union, waterpolo, korfball, American football and rugby football (the last two are available solely in the United States).

== Gallery ==
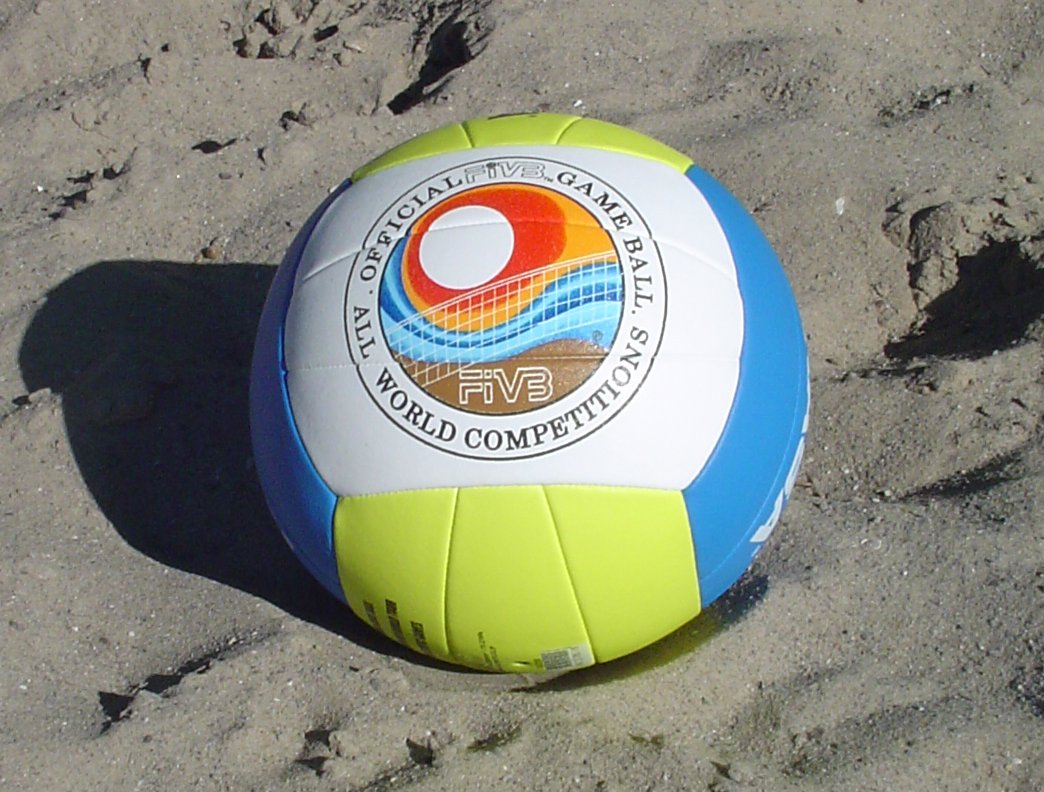
Beach volleyball

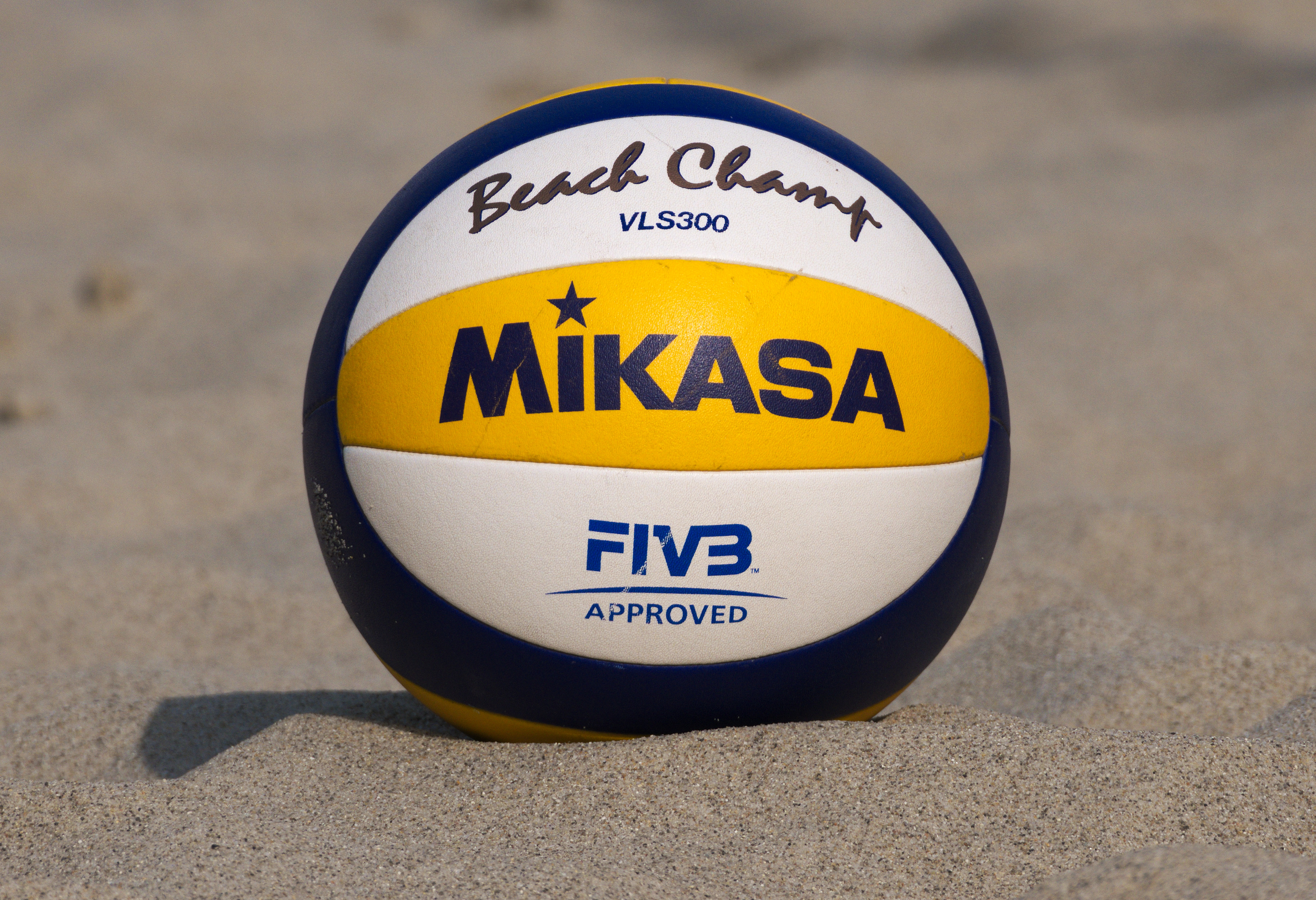
Mikasa VLS300

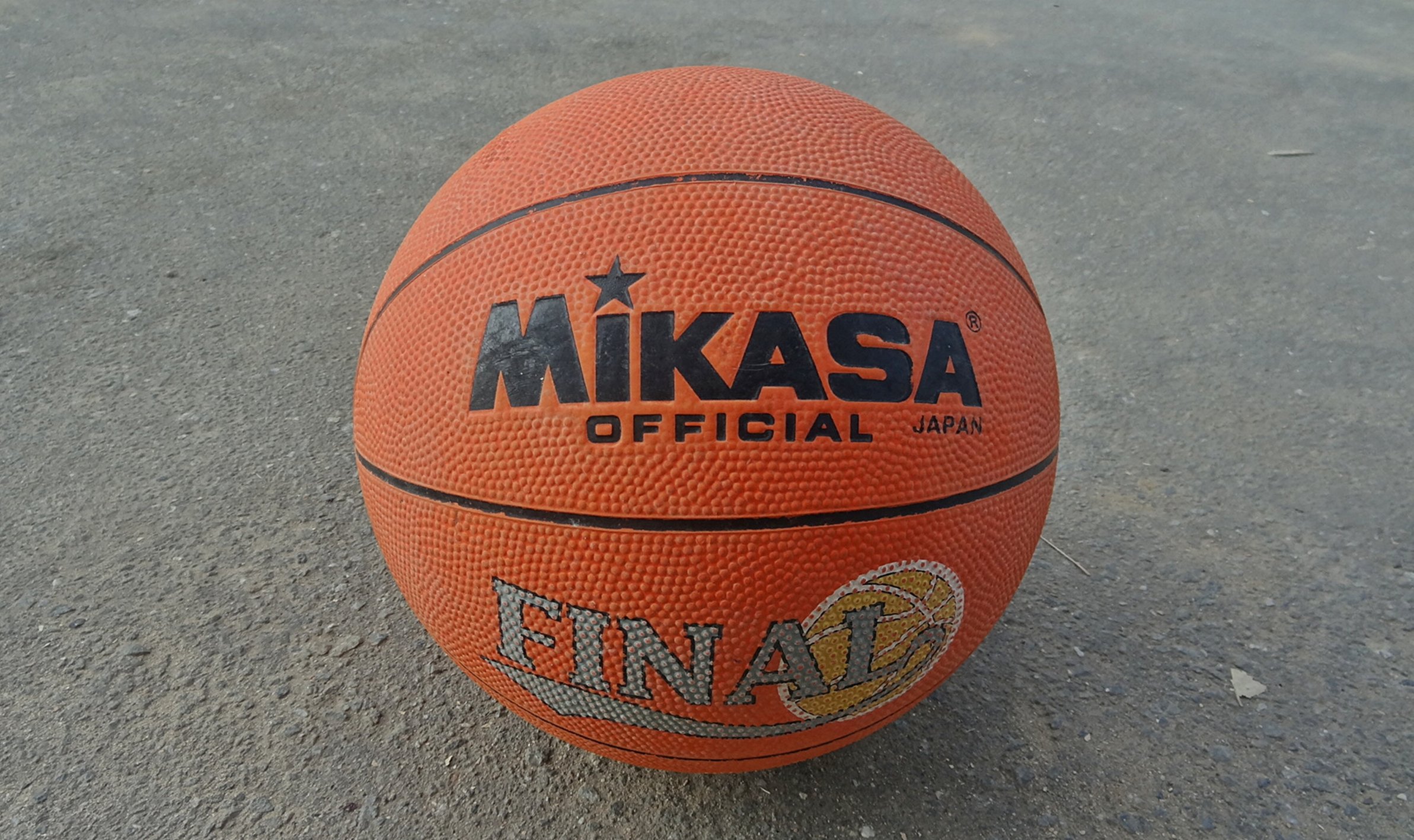
Basketball

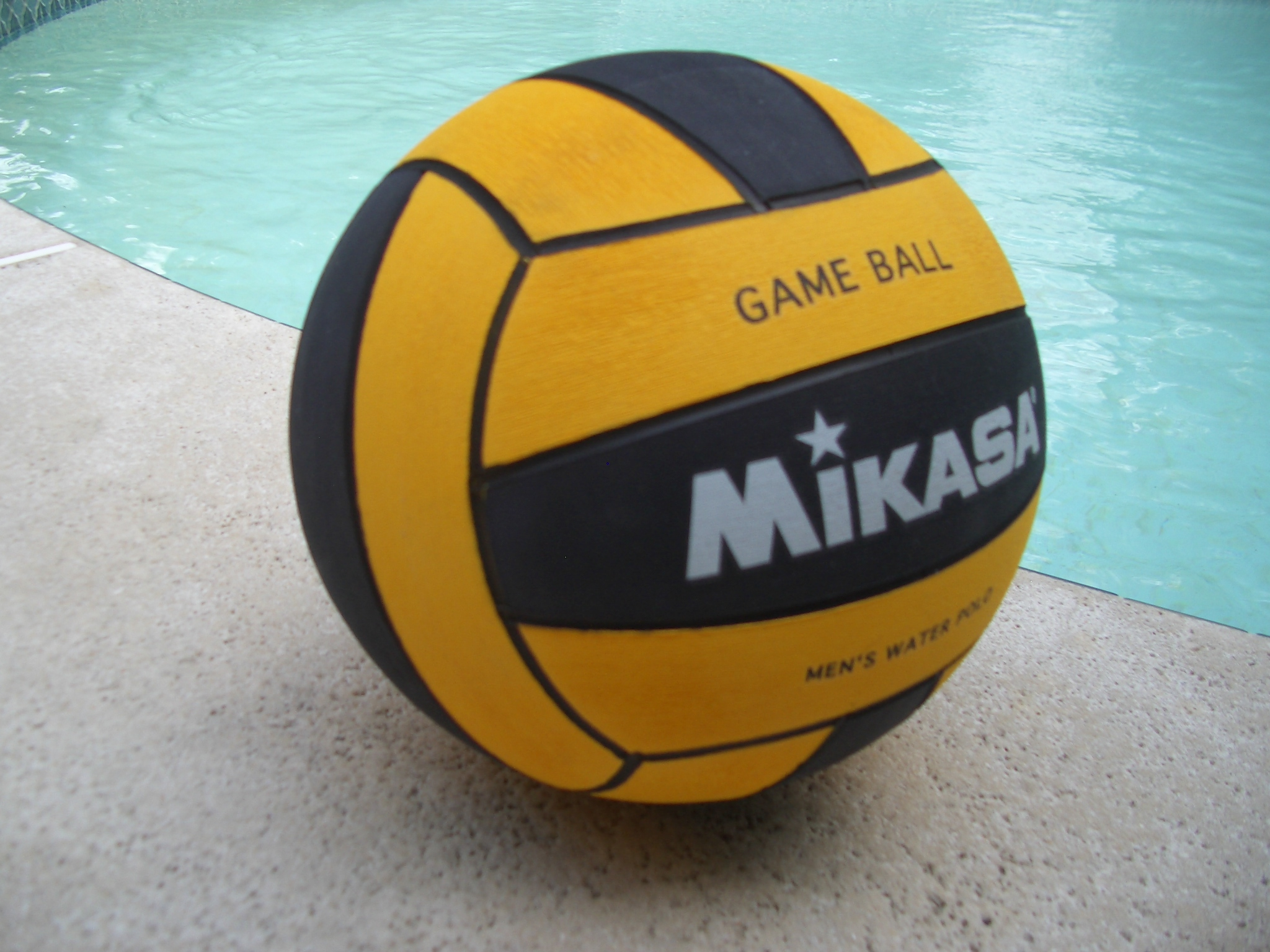
Water polo game ball

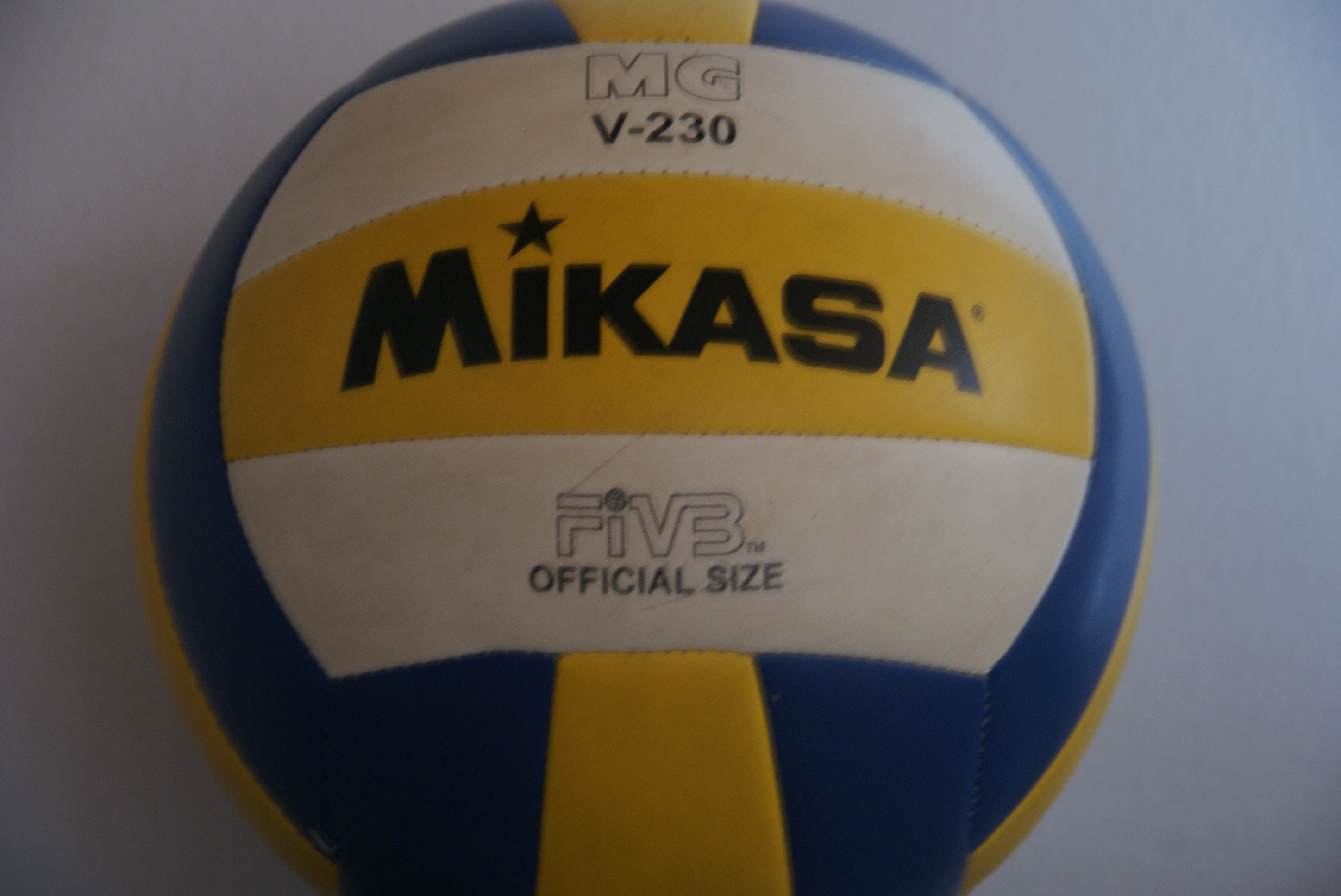
Indoor volleyball

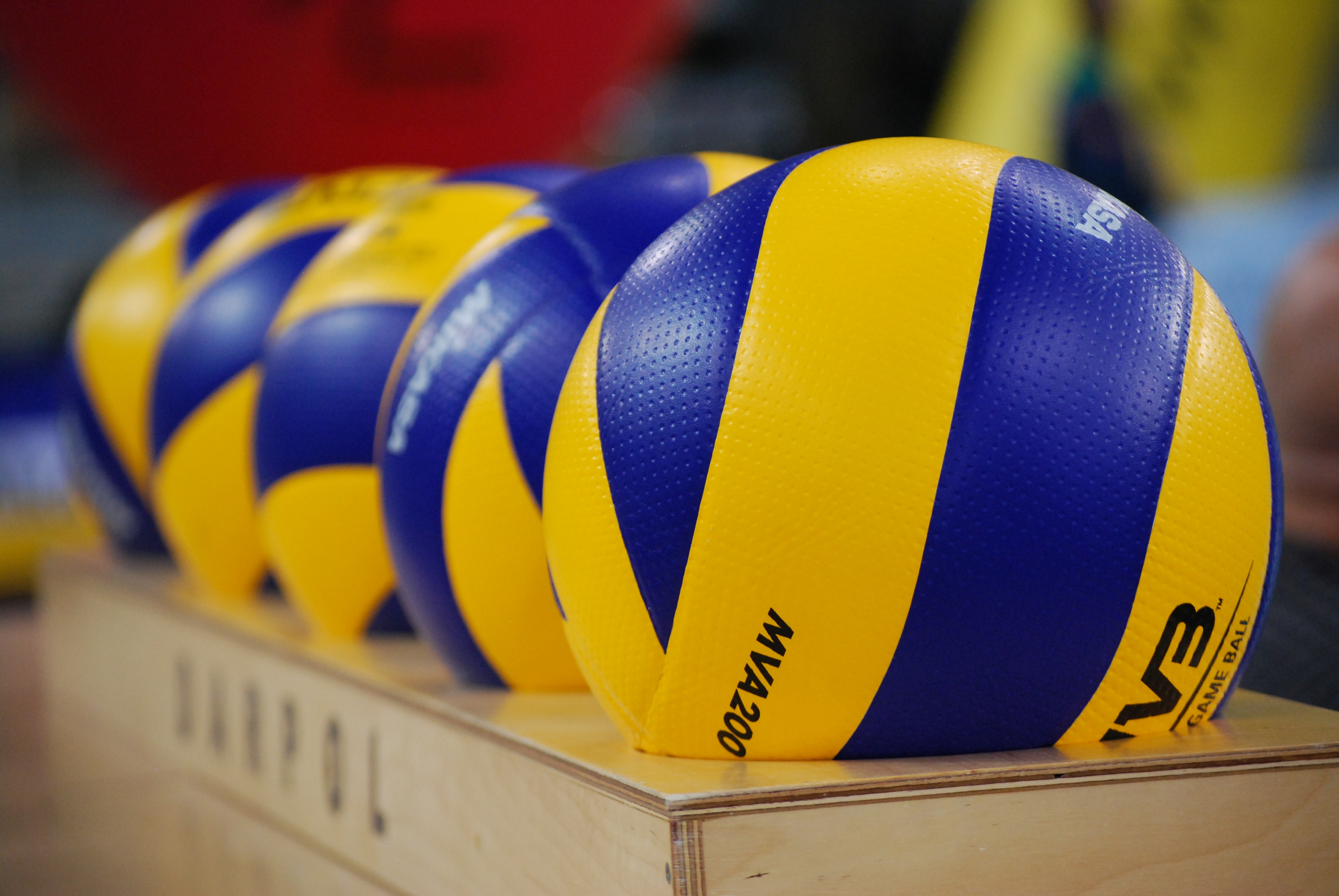
Volleyballs used in Poland

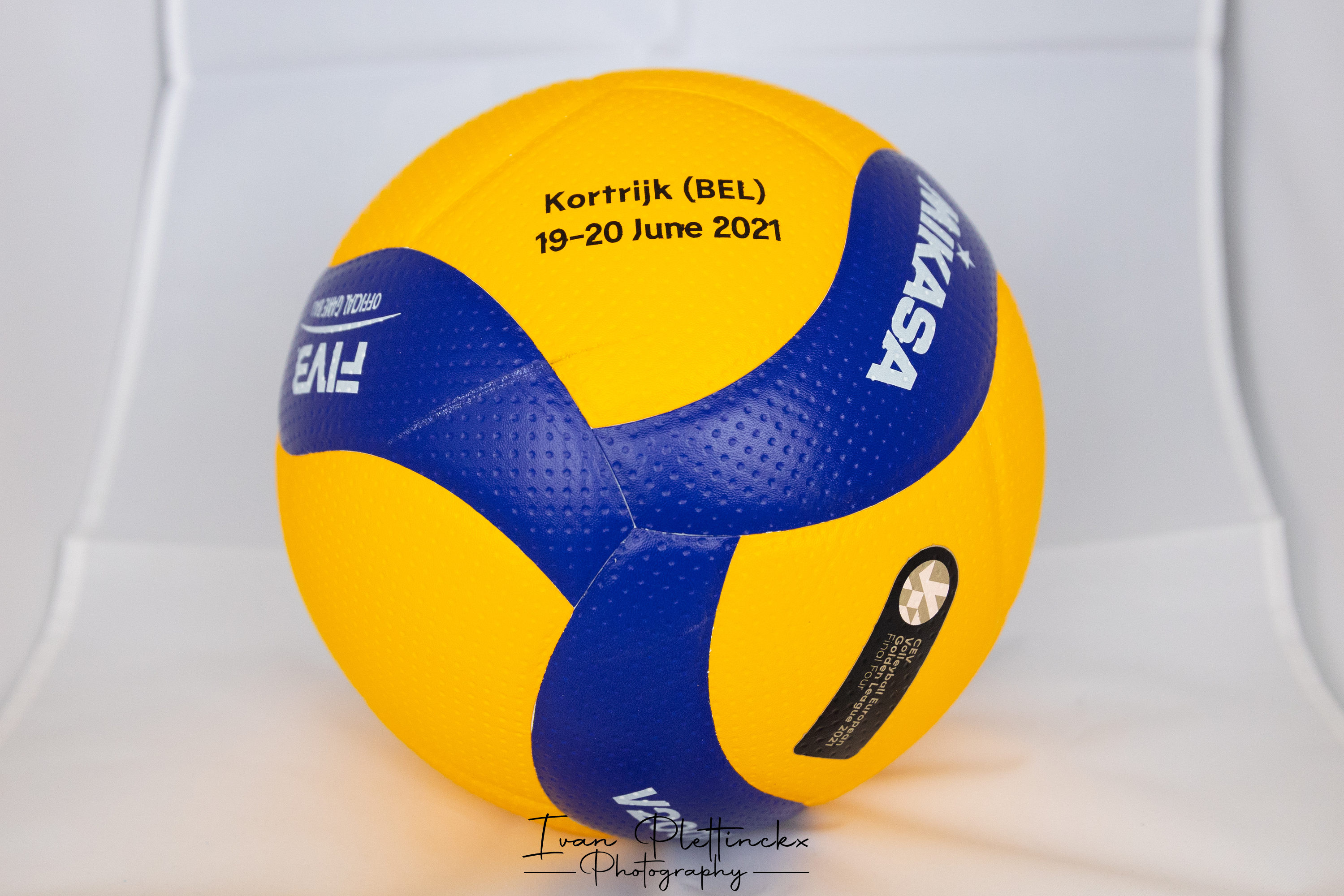
Mikasa V200W used at the European Golden League Final Four 2021

== See also ==
- Asics
- Molten
- Asian Games
- Universiade

== Bibliography ==
- Michigan High School Athletic Association Bulletin, Volume 70, Michigan High School Athletic Association, 1993, University of Michigan, p. 464.
- Gay and lesbian tourism: the essential guide for marketing, Jeff Guaracino, p. 146.
- Sports sponsor factbook, Team Marketing Report, Inc., 1999, p. 623.
- Japanese multinationals, facts & figures, Tōyō Keizai Shinpōsha, 2007, p. 268.
- American Commercial Inc. d/b/a Mikasa and Mikasa Licensing, Inc. v. Sports and Leisure International d/b/a Mikasa Sports, Civil Action No. 96–713LHM (U.S.D.C. C.D. Cal.).
