= Evernew (company) =

Japanese outdoor equipment manufacturer

Evernew, Inc.
- Type: Public K.K.
- Industry: Manufacturing
- Founded: 1924; 102 years ago
- Founder: Iwai Shinzō (岩井 新蔵)
- Headquarters: Tokyo, Japan
- Key people: Iwai Daisuke (岩井 大輔), Principal Shareholder
- Number of employees: 80 (est.)
- Website: www.evernew.co.jp

Evernew, Inc. (株式会社エバニュー, Ebanyū), stylized as EVERNEW, is a Japanese manufacturer of outdoor and sports equipment.

== History ==
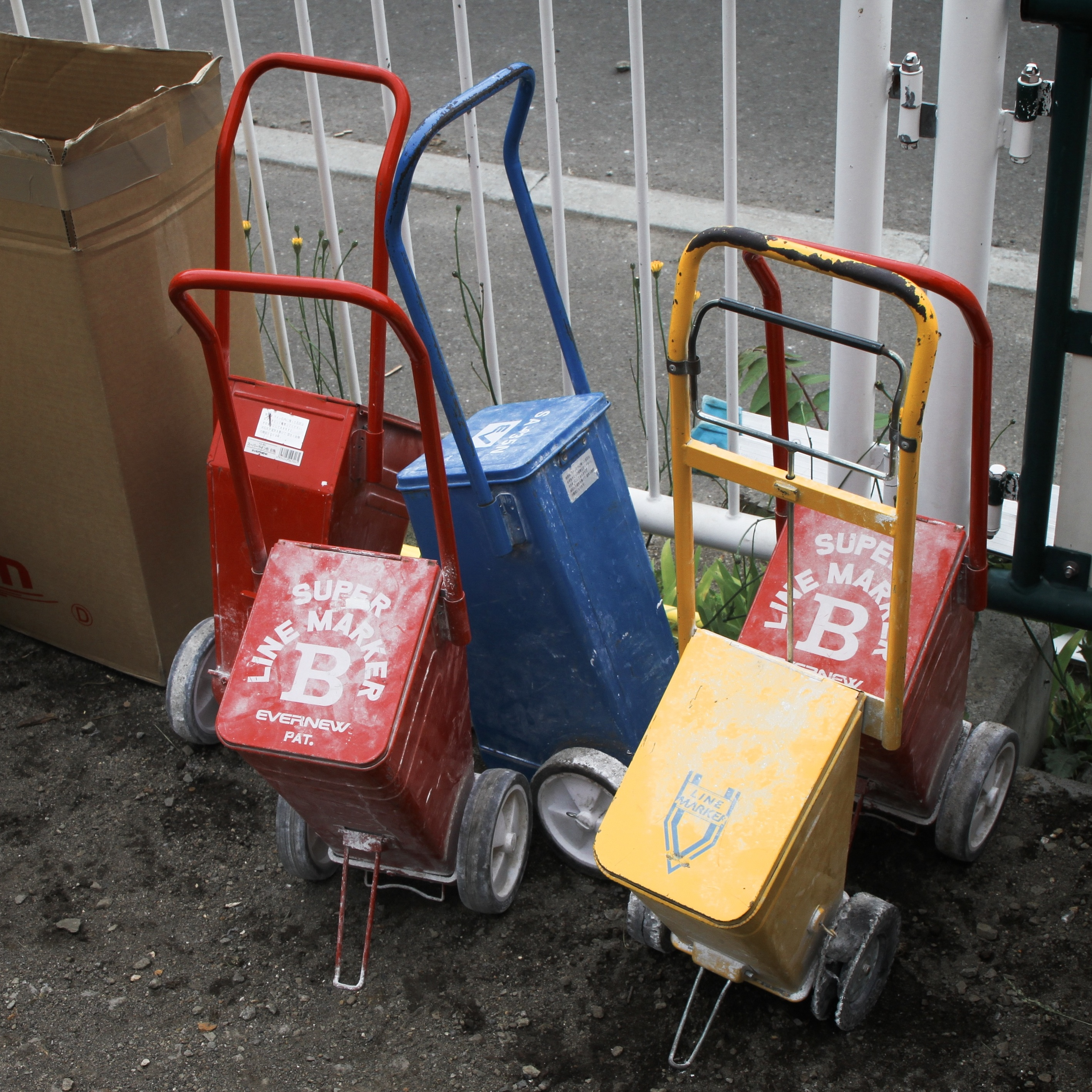
Line markers made by Evernew

Evernew was founded in 1924 under the name Masu-Shin shōten (増新商店) by Iwai Shinzō (岩井 新蔵), who split the company from his earlier operations at the toy manufacturer Masuda-ya (増田屋).

The Evernew brand name was established in 1933. In 1940, the company began manufacturing megaphones, mess tins, and kerosene lanterns. Operations were curtailed during the Second World War in order to conserve scarce resources for the war effort, and the company's offices were destroyed by the Great Bombing of Tokyo in 1945.

In the 1990s, Evernew collaborated with metalworkers in Niigata Prefecture to develop advanced fabrication techniques for titanium.

== See also ==
- Snow Peak (company)
- Tachikara
