= Council of Graduate Schools =

Nonprofitable higher education organization with headquarters in Washington, DC

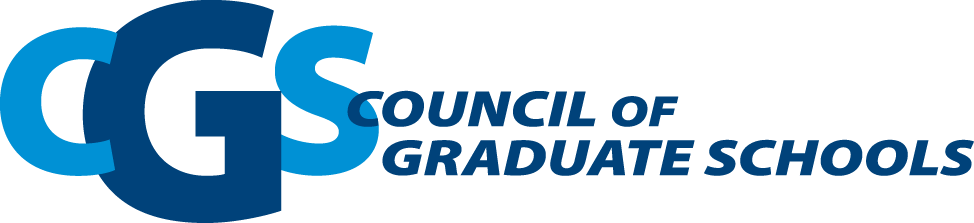
Council of Graduate Schools

The Council of Graduate Schools (CGS) is a nonprofit higher education organization with headquarters in Washington, DC. Its mission is to advance graduate education and research. Its main activities consist of best practice initiatives, data analysis, advocacy, and global engagement.

== Leadership ==
CGS is governed by a member-elected board of directors. Members of CGS's board of directors are elected to one- to three-year terms. The current president of CGS, Chevelle Newsome, began her tenure July 2025 after serving as the Dean of Graduate Studies at California State University, Sacramento.

Past CGS presidents:

- Suzanne Ortega (2014-2025)
- Debra W. Stewart (2000 – 2014)
- Jules B. LaPidus (1984 – 2000)
- Michael J. Pelczar Jr. (1978 – 1984)
- J. Boyd Page (1970 – 1978)
- Gustave O. Arlt (1961 – 1970)

== Projects and Programs ==
=== Initiatives ===
CGS collaborates with members on initiatives that address common challenges in graduate education. Examples of these initiatives include understanding PhD career pathways, financial literacy, challenges in degree completion and attrition, Preparing Future Faculty (launched in 1993), mental health and wellness, and scholarly integrity and the Responsible Conduct of Research (RCR).

=== Research and benchmarking ===
CGS researches and publishes its findings on specific metrics related to graduate education, including graduate enrollment and degrees and international graduate student applications, admissions and enrollments.

=== Advocacy ===
CGS advocates for graduate education before Congress and the Administration, working both independently and collaboratively with other national organizations to advance federal policies. Issue areas have included diversity and inclusiveness; the Higher Education Reauthorization Act; immigration reform; tax; and workforce development. CGS also provides resources and opportunities for its members to advocate on behalf of graduate education and research with campus stakeholders and policymakers.

=== Global engagement ===
CGS hosts meetings and publishes research on global trends in graduate education as well as graduate education in a global context. Examples of its global engagement include the annual Strategic Leaders Global Summit on Graduate Education, traditionally hosted outside the U.S., and the international graduate admissions survey issued annually.

=== Annual meeting and summer workshop ===
The Council of Graduate Schools convenes members for two major meetings per year: an annual meeting in early December and a summer workshop and New Deans Institute held in July.
