= Tachikara =

Japanese sports ball company

Tachikara Holdings, Ltd.
- Company type: Private
- Industry: Manufacturing
- Founded: 1915; 111 years ago
- Founder: Iimuro Toyosaburō
- Headquarters: 2-7-2, Matsugaya, Taito-ku, Tokyo 111-0036 Japan
- Key people: Wataru Takahashi (Representative Director)
- Products: Sports equipment
- Website: en.tachikara.jp tachikara.com

Tachikara is a Japanese sports ball brand. It was established in Tokyo in 1915 by Iimuro Toyosaburo. The brand has been a sponsor of Olympic events and organizations, and is known primarily for its volleyballs. Tachikara is named after the ancient Japanese kami of strength, Amenotajikarao.

== Olympics and affiliates ==
Tachikara was the official ball maker of the 1964 Summer Olympics, the 1968 Summer Olympics, and the 1980 Summer Olympics.

Volleyballs and volleyball nets made by Tachikara were used in the 1976 Summer Olympics.

Tachikara was the official ball of the International Volleyball Federation (FIVB) as volleyball was growing in popularity in the latter half of the 20th century, and the Canadian Volleyball Association, which eventually joined the FIVB, used the sale of Tachikara volleyballs as part of its early growth as an organization.

Tachikara has also sponsored USA Volleyball, which is the national governing body of volleyball in the United States.

== Colleges ==
=== AVCA ===
From 1980 to 1994, Tachikara sponsored the American Volleyball Coaches Association (AVCA) poll of the top ten women's college teams on a bi-weekly basis. The poll was known as Tachikara Top Ten Division I Women’s Volleyball Poll.

=== NJCAA ===
Tachikara has been a sponsor of the National Junior College Athletic Association (NJCAA) since 1985. This has made Tachikara the official brand of volleyballs used at two-year colleges in the United States for decades.

=== NAIA ===
In 2008, Tachikara renewed its sponsorship of the National Association of Intercollegiate Athletics (NAIA), making the Tachikara SV-5W the official volleyball for NAIA through 2012. In 2012, the partnership was extended to 2017.

== See also ==
- Evernew (company)
