= Pallavolo Torino =

Italian men's volleyball team

CUS Torino Pallavolo
- Founded: 1952 (dissolved in 2001)
- Ground: PalaRuffini
- Website: Club home page

CUS Torino Pallavolo was a professional men's volleyball team based in Turin, Italy. It is one of the most famous clubs which played in Serie A1 in the 1970s and in the 1980s, winning several Italian and European trophies.

== History ==
Founded in 1952 by the students who joined sports club of the University of Turin, CUS reached the highest level of Italian volleyball league in 1972.

Guided by Silvano Prandi and sponsored by industries Klippan and Kappa, the club in the next decade won four national titles (1978–79, 1979–80, 1990–81 and 1983–84), a CEV Champions League (1980) and a Cup Winner's Cup.

In 1988, for economic reasons, it did not enroll at Serie A1 and restarted from the lower divisions. In 2001 the team merged into Piemonte Volley. Its heredity is today carried on by another club, Pallavolo Torino.

== Sources and references ==
- Pallavolo Torino official site
- Volleyball @ custorino.it
