= 2015 FIVB Volleyball World League squads =

This article show all participating team squads at the 2015 FIVB Volleyball World League, played by thirty-two countries with the final round held in different countries.

== Group 1 ==
=== Pool A ===
==== Australia ====
The following is the Australian roster in the 2015 FIVB Volleyball World League.

Head coach: (Italy) Roberto Santilli

No.	Name	Date of birth	Height	Weight	Spike	Block	2015 club
1	Aidan Zingel (c)	19 November 1990	2.07 m (6 ft 9 in)	100 kg (220 lb)	361 cm (142 in)	346 cm (136 in)	(Italy) Blu Volley Verona
2	Jacob Ross Guymer	21 June 1993	2.03 m (6 ft 8 in)	100 kg (220 lb)	350 cm (140 in)	339 cm (133 in)	(Sweden) Örkelljunga VK
3	Nathan Roberts	17 February 1986	1.99 m (6 ft 6 in)	90 kg (200 lb)	342 cm (135 in)	328 cm (129 in)	(Slovenia) ACH Lubiana
4	Paul Sanderson	7 January 1986	1.95 m (6 ft 5 in)	94 kg (207 lb)	348 cm (137 in)	335 cm (132 in)	(Indonesia) Jakarta Pertamina Energi
5	Travis Passier	26 April 1989	2.06 m (6 ft 9 in)	99 kg (218 lb)	351 cm (138 in)	340 cm (130 in)	(Australia) Australian Institute of Sport
6	Thomas Edgar	21 June 1989	2.12 m (6 ft 11 in)	106 kg (234 lb)	357 cm (141 in)	341 cm (134 in)	(South Korea) LIG Insurance Greaters
7	Harrison Peacock	31 January 1991	1.92 m (6 ft 4 in)	87 kg (192 lb)	353 cm (139 in)	339 cm (133 in)	(Australia) Australian Institute of Sport
8	Jacques Borgeaud (L)	19 June 1991	1.78 m (5 ft 10 in)	70 kg (150 lb)	321 cm (126 in)	310 cm (120 in)	(Canada) University of Regina
9	Adam White	8 November 1989	2.03 m (6 ft 8 in)	89 kg (196 lb)	351 cm (138 in)	336 cm (132 in)	(Italy) Blu Volley Verona
10	Benjamin Bell	24 February 1990	2.00 m (6 ft 7 in)	92 kg (203 lb)	345 cm (136 in)	333 cm (131 in)	(Sweden) Linköpings VC
11	Luke Perry (L)	20 November 1995	1.80 m (5 ft 11 in)	75 kg (165 lb)	330 cm (130 in)	315 cm (124 in)	(Finland) Team Lakkapaa
12	Nehemiah Mote	21 June 1993	2.04 m (6 ft 8 in)	91 kg (201 lb)	362 cm (143 in)	354 cm (139 in)	(Germany) TV Bühl
13	Samuel Walker	19 February 1995	2.08 m (6 ft 10 in)	90 kg (200 lb)	350 cm (140 in)	337 cm (133 in)	(Italy) Corigliano Volley
14	Grigory Sukochev	18 February 1988	1.96 m (6 ft 5 in)	86 kg (190 lb)	340 cm (130 in)	329 cm (130 in)	(Lebanon) Tannourine Club
15	Thomas Douglas-Powell	16 September 1992	1.94 m (6 ft 4 in)	82 kg (181 lb)	356 cm (140 in)	332 cm (131 in)	(Canada) University of Winnipeg
16	Luke Smith	30 August 1990	2.04 m (6 ft 8 in)	95 kg (209 lb)	360 cm (140 in)	342 cm (135 in)	(Germany) TSV Herrshing
17	Paul Carroll	16 May 1986	2.07 m (6 ft 9 in)	98 kg (216 lb)	354 cm (139 in)	340 cm (130 in)	(Germany) Berlin Recycling Volleys
18	Lincoln Williams	6 October 1993	2.00 m (6 ft 7 in)	104 kg (229 lb)	353 cm (139 in)	330 cm (130 in)	(Estonia) Selver Tallinn VC
19	Shane Alexander	7 January 1986	2.02 m (6 ft 8 in)	95 kg (209 lb)	339 cm (133 in)	320 cm (130 in)	(Australia) Queensland Pirates
20	Alexander Mcmullin	1 August 1995	2.01 m (6 ft 7 in)	76 kg (168 lb)	355 cm (140 in)	340 cm (130 in)	(Canada) University of Alberta
21	Arshdeep Dosanjh	30 July 1996	2.05 m (6 ft 9 in)	85 kg (187 lb)	347 cm (137 in)	335 cm (132 in)	(Finland) Team Lakkapaa
22	Trent O'Dea	11 May 1994	2.01 m (6 ft 7 in)	95 kg (209 lb)	354 cm (139 in)	344 cm (135 in)	(Sweden) Linköpings VC
23	Beau Graham	17 April 1994	2.02 m (6 ft 8 in)	86 kg (190 lb)	351 cm (138 in)	332 cm (131 in)	(Romania) Stiinta Explorari
24	Jordan Richards	25 September 1993	1.93 m (6 ft 4 in)	80 kg (180 lb)	354 cm (139 in)	342 cm (135 in)	(Germany) TV Schonenwerd
25	Thomas Hodges	4 July 1994	1.97 m (6 ft 6 in)	95 kg (209 lb)	350 cm (140 in)	338 cm (133 in)	(United States) UC Irvine

==== Brazil ====
The following is the Brazilian roster in the 2015 FIVB Volleyball World League.

Head coach: Bernardo Rezende

No.	Name	Date of birth	Height	Weight	Spike	Block	2015 club
1	Bruno Rezende (c)	2 July 1986	1.90 m (6 ft 3 in)	76 kg (168 lb)	323 cm (127 in)	302 cm (119 in)	(Italy) Pallavolo Modena
2	Isac Santos	13 December 1990	2.05 m (6 ft 9 in)	84 kg (185 lb)	339 cm (133 in)	306 cm (120 in)	(Brazil) Sada Cruzeiro Vôlei
3	Éder Carbonera	19 October 1983	2.04 m (6 ft 8 in)	101 kg (223 lb)	350 cm (140 in)	330 cm (130 in)	(Brazil) Sada Cruzeiro Vôlei
4	Wallace Souza	26 June 1987	1.98 m (6 ft 6 in)	87 kg (192 lb)	344 cm (135 in)	318 cm (125 in)	(Brazil) Sada Cruzeiro Vôlei
5	Sidnei Santos	9 July 1982	2.03 m (6 ft 8 in)	98 kg (216 lb)	344 cm (135 in)	318 cm (125 in)	(Brazil) Taubaté Funvic
6	Leandro Vissotto	30 April 1983	2.12 m (6 ft 11 in)	97 kg (214 lb)	370 cm (150 in)	345 cm (136 in)	(Japan) JT Thunders
7	William Arjona	31 July 1979	1.85 m (6 ft 1 in)	78 kg (172 lb)	300 cm (120 in)	295 cm (116 in)	(Brazil) Sada Cruzeiro Vôlei
8	Murilo Endres	3 May 1981	1.90 m (6 ft 3 in)	76 kg (168 lb)	343 cm (135 in)	319 cm (126 in)	(Brazil) SESI São Paulo
9	Raphael Oliveira	14 June 1979	1.90 m (6 ft 3 in)	82 kg (181 lb)	330 cm (130 in)	306 cm (120 in)	(Brazil) Taubaté Funvic
10	Sérgio Santos (L)	15 October 1975	1.84 m (6 ft 0 in)	78 kg (172 lb)	325 cm (128 in)	310 cm (120 in)	(Brazil) SESI São Paulo
11	Felipe Silva (L)	25 August 1990	1.88 m (6 ft 2 in)	77 kg (170 lb)	302 cm (119 in)	297 cm (117 in)	(Brazil) Taubaté Funvic
12	Luiz Fonteles	19 June 1984	1.96 m (6 ft 5 in)	89 kg (196 lb)	330 cm (130 in)	320 cm (130 in)	(Brazil) Taubaté Funvic
13	Maurício Souza	29 September 1988	2.07 m (6 ft 9 in)	99 kg (218 lb)	0 cm (0 in)	0 cm (0 in)	(Brazil) Taubaté Funvic
14	Samuel Fuchs	4 March 1984	2.00 m (6 ft 7 in)	89 kg (196 lb)	342 cm (135 in)	316 cm (124 in)	(Brazil) Minas Tênis Clube
15	Evandro Guerra	27 December 1981	2.07 m (6 ft 9 in)	103 kg (227 lb)	359 cm (141 in)	332 cm (131 in)	(Japan) Suntory Sunbirds
16	Lucas Saatkamp	6 March 1986	2.09 m (6 ft 10 in)	101 kg (223 lb)	340 cm (130 in)	321 cm (126 in)	(Brazil) SESI São Paulo
17	Murilo Radke	31 January 1989	1.94 m (6 ft 4 in)	76 kg (168 lb)	329 cm (130 in)	310 cm (120 in)	(Poland) Transfer Bydgoszcz
18	Ricardo Lucarelli	14 February 1992	1.95 m (6 ft 5 in)	79 kg (174 lb)	338 cm (133 in)	308 cm (121 in)	(Brazil) SESI São Paulo
19	Mário Pedreira (L)	3 May 1982	1.92 m (6 ft 4 in)	91 kg (201 lb)	330 cm (130 in)	321 cm (126 in)	(Italy) Volley Piacenza
20	Renan Buiatti	10 January 1990	2.12 m (6 ft 11 in)	85 kg (187 lb)	330 cm (130 in)	314 cm (124 in)	(Italy) Ravenna Volley
21	Tiago Brendle (L)	21 October 1985	1.88 m (6 ft 2 in)	83 kg (183 lb)	315 cm (124 in)	300 cm (120 in)	(Brazil) Ziober Maringá Vôlei
22	Maurício Silva	4 February 1989	1.99 m (6 ft 6 in)	99 kg (218 lb)	335 cm (132 in)	315 cm (124 in)	(Brazil) SESI São Paulo
23	Riad Ribeiro	2 October 1981	2.04 m (6 ft 8 in)	100 kg (220 lb)	345 cm (136 in)	325 cm (128 in)	(Brazil) SESI São Paulo
24	Fernando Kreling	13 January 1996	1.83 m (6 ft 0 in)	89 kg (196 lb)	320 cm (130 in)	302 cm (119 in)	(Brazil) Sada Cruzeiro Vôlei
25	Lucas Eduardo Lóh	18 January 1991	1.95 m (6 ft 5 in)	83 kg (183 lb)	336 cm (132 in)	320 cm (130 in)	(Poland) ZAKSA Kędzierzyn-Koźle

==== Italy ====
The following is the Italian roster in the 2015 FIVB Volleyball World League.

Head coach: Mauro Berruto

No.	Name	Date of birth	Height	Weight	Spike	Block	2015 club
1	Stefano Mengozzi	6 May 1985	2.02 m (6 ft 8 in)	88 kg (194 lb)	333 cm (131 in)	318 cm (125 in)	(Italy) Robur Porto Costa
2	Gabriele Nelli	4 December 1993	2.10 m (6 ft 11 in)	100 kg (220 lb)	355 cm (140 in)	320 cm (130 in)	(Italy) Trentino Volley
3	Giacomo Raffaelli	7 February 1995	1.98 m (6 ft 6 in)	95 kg (209 lb)	338 cm (133 in)	330 cm (130 in)	(Italy) Club Italia
4	Luca Vettori	26 April 1991	2.00 m (6 ft 7 in)	95 kg (209 lb)	345 cm (136 in)	323 cm (127 in)	(Italy) Pallavolo Modena
5	Adriano Paolucci	11 February 1979	1.90 m (6 ft 3 in)	84 kg (185 lb)	310 cm (120 in)	290 cm (110 in)	(Italy) Sir Safety Perugia
6	Simone Giannelli	6 August 1996	1.98 m (6 ft 6 in)	92 kg (203 lb)	342 cm (135 in)	265 cm (104 in)	(Italy) Trentino Volley
7	Salvatore Rossini (L)	13 July 1986	1.85 m (6 ft 1 in)	82 kg (181 lb)	312 cm (123 in)	301 cm (119 in)	(Italy) Pallavolo Modena
8	Davide Saitta	23 June 1987	1.82 m (6 ft 0 in)	92 kg (203 lb)	320 cm (130 in)	300 cm (120 in)	(France) Spacer's Toulouse
9	Ivan Zaytsev	2 October 1988	2.02 m (6 ft 8 in)	92 kg (203 lb)	355 cm (140 in)	348 cm (137 in)	(Russia) Dinamo Moscow
10	Filippo Lanza	3 March 1991	1.98 m (6 ft 6 in)	98 kg (216 lb)	350 cm (140 in)	330 cm (130 in)	(Italy) Trentino Volley
11	Simone Buti	19 September 1983	2.06 m (6 ft 9 in)	100 kg (220 lb)	346 cm (136 in)	328 cm (129 in)	(Italy) Sir Safety Perugia
12	Luigi Randazzo	30 April 1994	1.98 m (6 ft 6 in)	97 kg (214 lb)	352 cm (139 in)	255 cm (100 in)	(Italy) Altotevere Città di Castello
13	Dragan Travica	28 August 1986	2.00 m (6 ft 7 in)	94 kg (207 lb)	335 cm (132 in)	320 cm (130 in)	(Russia) Belogorie Belgorod
14	Matteo Piano	24 October 1990	2.08 m (6 ft 10 in)	102 kg (225 lb)	352 cm (139 in)	325 cm (128 in)	(Italy) Pallavolo Modena
15	Emanuele Birarelli (c)	8 February 1981	2.02 m (6 ft 8 in)	95 kg (209 lb)	340 cm (130 in)	316 cm (124 in)	(Italy) Trentino Volley
16	Oleg Antonov	28 July 1988	1.98 m (6 ft 6 in)	88 kg (194 lb)	340 cm (130 in)	310 cm (120 in)	(France) Tours Volley-Ball
17	Andrea Giovi (L)	19 August 1983	1.83 m (6 ft 0 in)	80 kg (180 lb)	310 cm (120 in)	290 cm (110 in)	(Italy) Sir Safety Perugia
18	Giulio Sabbi	10 August 1989	2.01 m (6 ft 7 in)	92 kg (203 lb)	352 cm (139 in)	325 cm (128 in)	(Italy) Lube Banca Macerata
19	Simone Anzani	24 February 1992	2.04 m (6 ft 8 in)	100 kg (220 lb)	350 cm (140 in)	330 cm (130 in)	(Italy) Blu Volley Verona
20	Massimo Colaci (L)	21 February 1985	1.80 m (5 ft 11 in)	75 kg (165 lb)	324 cm (128 in)	308 cm (121 in)	(Italy) Trentino Volley
21	Andrea Galliani	6 January 1988	2.04 m (6 ft 8 in)	93 kg (205 lb)	360 cm (140 in)	335 cm (132 in)	(Italy) Vero Volley
22	Elia Bossi	15 August 1994	2.02 m (6 ft 8 in)	91 kg (201 lb)	343 cm (135 in)	320 cm (130 in)	(Italy) Pallavolo Molfetta
23	Iacopo Botto	22 September 1987	1.91 m (6 ft 3 in)	76 kg (168 lb)	345 cm (136 in)	320 cm (130 in)	(Italy) Vero Volley
24	Aimone Alletti	28 June 1988	2.07 m (6 ft 9 in)	90 kg (200 lb)	342 cm (135 in)	310 cm (120 in)	(Italy) Copra Piacenza
25	Jacopo Massari	2 June 1988	1.85 m (6 ft 1 in)	79 kg (174 lb)	328 cm (129 in)	310 cm (120 in)	(Italy) Copra Piacenza

==== Serbia ====
The following is the Serbian roster in the 2015 FIVB Volleyball World League.

Head coach: Nikola Grbić

No.	Name	Date of birth	Height	Weight	Spike	Block	2015 club
1	Nikola Kovačević (c)	14 February 1983	1.93 m (6 ft 4 in)	78 kg (172 lb)	350 cm (140 in)	340 cm (130 in)	(France) Paris Volley
2	Uroš Kovačević	6 May 1993	1.97 m (6 ft 6 in)	90 kg (200 lb)	340 cm (130 in)	310 cm (120 in)	(Italy) Pallavolo Modena
3	Marko Ivović	22 December 1990	1.92 m (6 ft 4 in)	89 kg (196 lb)	350 cm (140 in)	330 cm (130 in)	(Poland) Asseco Resovia Rzeszów
4	Nemanja Petrić	28 July 1987	2.02 m (6 ft 8 in)	86 kg (190 lb)	333 cm (131 in)	320 cm (130 in)	(Italy) Pallavolo Modena
5	Ivan Kostić	8 January 1988	1.92 m (6 ft 4 in)	90 kg (200 lb)	327 cm (129 in)	320 cm (130 in)	(Serbia) Partizan Beograd
6	Filip Stoilović	11 October 1992	1.95 m (6 ft 5 in)	89 kg (196 lb)	337 cm (133 in)	315 cm (124 in)	(Serbia) Crvena Zvezda Beograd
7	Dragan Stanković	18 October 1985	2.05 m (6 ft 9 in)	80 kg (180 lb)	343 cm (135 in)	333 cm (131 in)	(Italy) Lube Banca Macerata
8	Milan Katić	22 October 1993	2.02 m (6 ft 8 in)	99 kg (218 lb)	345 cm (136 in)	331 cm (130 in)	(Serbia) Vojvodina NS Seme
9	Nikola Jovović	13 February 1992	1.97 m (6 ft 6 in)	75 kg (165 lb)	335 cm (132 in)	315 cm (124 in)	(Italy) Volley Milano
10	Konstantin Čupković	2 January 1987	2.02 m (6 ft 8 in)	90 kg (200 lb)	337 cm (133 in)	315 cm (124 in)	(Poland) Transfer Bydgoszcz
11	Mihajlo Mitić	17 September 1990	2.01 m (6 ft 7 in)	86 kg (190 lb)	345 cm (136 in)	320 cm (130 in)	(France) Chaumont Vb 52
12	Dejan Radić	6 November 1984	2.00 m (6 ft 7 in)	95 kg (209 lb)	360 cm (140 in)	340 cm (130 in)	(France) AS Cannes
13	Dušan Petković	27 January 1992	2.02 m (6 ft 8 in)	86 kg (190 lb)	328 cm (129 in)	310 cm (120 in)	(France) AS Cannes
14	Aleksandar Atanasijević	4 September 1991	2.00 m (6 ft 7 in)	92 kg (203 lb)	350 cm (140 in)	329 cm (130 in)	(Italy) Sir Safety Perugia
15	Saša Starović	19 October 1988	2.07 m (6 ft 9 in)	89 kg (196 lb)	335 cm (132 in)	321 cm (126 in)	(Italy) Top Volley Latina
16	Aleksa Brđović	29 July 1993	2.04 m (6 ft 8 in)	90 kg (200 lb)	355 cm (140 in)	330 cm (130 in)	(Poland) PGE Skra Bełchatów
17	Neven Majstorović (L)	17 March 1989	1.92 m (6 ft 4 in)	83 kg (183 lb)	325 cm (128 in)	315 cm (124 in)	(Serbia) Partizan Vizura Beograd
18	Marko Podraščanin	29 August 1987	2.04 m (6 ft 8 in)	92 kg (203 lb)	354 cm (139 in)	332 cm (131 in)	(Italy) Lube Banca Macerata
19	Nikola Rosić (L)	5 August 1984	1.92 m (6 ft 4 in)	85 kg (187 lb)	330 cm (130 in)	320 cm (130 in)	(Romania) Tomis Constanța
20	Srećko Lisinac	17 May 1992	2.05 m (6 ft 9 in)	79 kg (174 lb)	355 cm (140 in)	342 cm (135 in)	(Poland) PGE Skra Bełchatów
21	Petar Krsmanović	1 June 1990	2.05 m (6 ft 9 in)	98 kg (216 lb)	354 cm (139 in)	330 cm (130 in)	(Montenegro) Budvanska rivijera Budva
22	Aleksandar Okolić	26 June 1993	2.05 m (6 ft 9 in)	90 kg (200 lb)	347 cm (137 in)	320 cm (130 in)	(Serbia) Crvena Zvezda Beograd
23	Dražen Luburić	2 November 1993	2.02 m (6 ft 8 in)	90 kg (200 lb)	337 cm (133 in)	331 cm (130 in)	(Serbia) Vojvodina NS Seme
24	Milija Mrdak	26 October 1991	2.01 m (6 ft 7 in)	86 kg (190 lb)	350 cm (140 in)	335 cm (132 in)	(Serbia) Partizan Vizura Beograd
25	Bojan Rajković	15 February 1991	1.90 m (6 ft 3 in)	71 kg (157 lb)	315 cm (124 in)	302 cm (119 in)	(Serbia) Partizan Vizura Beograd

=== Pool B ===
==== Iran ====
The following is the Iranian roster in the 2015 FIVB Volleyball World League.

Head coach: (Serbia) Slobodan Kovač

No.	Name	Date of birth	Height	Weight	Spike	Block	2015 club
1	Shahram Mahmoudi	20 July 1988	1.98 m (6 ft 6 in)	95 kg (209 lb)	347 cm (137 in)	332 cm (131 in)	(Iran) Shahrdari Urmia
2	Milad Ebadipour	17 October 1993	1.96 m (6 ft 5 in)	78 kg (172 lb)	350 cm (140 in)	310 cm (120 in)	(Iran) Shahrdari Urmia
3	Saman Faezi	23 August 1991	2.04 m (6 ft 8 in)	87 kg (192 lb)	343 cm (135 in)	335 cm (132 in)	(Iran) Paykan Tehran
4	Saeid Marouf (c)	20 October 1985	1.89 m (6 ft 2 in)	81 kg (179 lb)	331 cm (130 in)	311 cm (122 in)	(Russia) Zenit Kazan
5	Farhad Ghaemi	28 August 1989	1.97 m (6 ft 6 in)	73 kg (161 lb)	355 cm (140 in)	335 cm (132 in)	(Iran) Paykan Tehran
6	Mohammad Mousavi	22 August 1987	2.03 m (6 ft 8 in)	86 kg (190 lb)	362 cm (143 in)	344 cm (135 in)	(Iran) Paykan Tehran
7	Hamzeh Zarini	18 October 1985	1.98 m (6 ft 6 in)	98 kg (216 lb)	351 cm (138 in)	330 cm (130 in)	(Iran) Matin Varamin
8	Farhad Zarif (L)	3 March 1983	1.65 m (5 ft 5 in)	60 kg (130 lb)	290 cm (110 in)	271 cm (107 in)	(Iran) Mizan Mashhad
9	Adel Gholami	9 February 1986	1.95 m (6 ft 5 in)	88 kg (194 lb)	341 cm (134 in)	330 cm (130 in)	(Iran) Mizan Mashhad
10	Amir Ghafour	6 June 1991	2.02 m (6 ft 8 in)	90 kg (200 lb)	354 cm (139 in)	334 cm (131 in)	(Iran) Matin Varamin
11	Farhad Piroutpour	21 February 1991	1.97 m (6 ft 6 in)	90 kg (200 lb)	360 cm (140 in)	350 cm (140 in)	(Iran) Shahrdari Urmia
12	Mojtaba Mirzajanpour	7 October 1991	2.05 m (6 ft 9 in)	88 kg (194 lb)	325 cm (128 in)	315 cm (124 in)	(Iran) Paykan Tehran
13	Mehdi Mahdavi	13 February 1984	1.91 m (6 ft 3 in)	96 kg (212 lb)	330 cm (130 in)	310 cm (120 in)	(Iran) Mizan Mashhad
14	Arash Keshavarzi	16 February 1987	1.98 m (6 ft 6 in)	94 kg (207 lb)	344 cm (135 in)	325 cm (128 in)	(Iran) Matin Varamin
15	Mostafa Sharifat	16 September 1987	2.04 m (6 ft 8 in)	85 kg (187 lb)	332 cm (131 in)	313 cm (123 in)	(Iran) Matin Varamin
16	Abdolreza Alizadeh (L)	19 February 1987	1.83 m (6 ft 0 in)	80 kg (180 lb)	272 cm (107 in)	252 cm (99 in)	(Iran) Shahrdari Urmia
17	Pourya Fayazi	12 January 1993	1.94 m (6 ft 4 in)	87 kg (192 lb)	348 cm (137 in)	326 cm (128 in)	(Iran) Shahrdari Urmia
18	Mohammad Taher Vadi	10 October 1989	1.94 m (6 ft 4 in)	72 kg (159 lb)	329 cm (130 in)	315 cm (124 in)	(Iran) Matin Varamin
19	Mehdi Marandi (L)	12 May 1986	1.72 m (5 ft 8 in)	69 kg (152 lb)	295 cm (116 in)	280 cm (110 in)	(Iran) Shahrdari Tabriz
20	Mikaeil Tajer	1 May 1984	2.01 m (6 ft 7 in)	80 kg (180 lb)	335 cm (132 in)	315 cm (124 in)	(Iran) Shahrdari Tabriz
21	Reza Abedini	19 May 1991	2.03 m (6 ft 8 in)	93 kg (205 lb)	354 cm (139 in)	348 cm (137 in)	(Iran) Vezarat Defa
22	Mohammad Hassan Senobar	11 July 1989	2.10 m (6 ft 11 in)	94 kg (207 lb)	370 cm (150 in)	361 cm (142 in)	(Iran) Shahrdari Tabriz
23	Ali Shafiei	21 September 1991	1.90 m (6 ft 3 in)	80 kg (180 lb)	348 cm (137 in)	345 cm (136 in)	(Iran) Bank Keshavarzi
24	Mohammadjavad Manavinezhad	27 November 1995	2.00 m (6 ft 7 in)	84 kg (185 lb)	340 cm (130 in)	320 cm (130 in)	(Iran) Paykan Tehran
25	Rasoul Najafi	23 July 1991	1.96 m (6 ft 5 in)	85 kg (187 lb)	325 cm (128 in)	317 cm (125 in)	(Iran) Vezarat Defa

==== Poland ====
The following is the Polish roster in the 2015 FIVB Volleyball World League.

Head coach: Stephane Antiga

No.	Name	Date of birth	Height	Weight	Spike`	Block	2015 club
1	Piotr Nowakowski	18 December 1987	2.05 m (6 ft 9 in)	90 kg (200 lb)	355 cm (140 in)	340 cm (130 in)	(Poland) Asseco Resovia Rzeszów
2	Wojciech Grzyb	4 January 1981	2.05 m (6 ft 9 in)	104 kg (229 lb)	360 cm (140 in)	340 cm (130 in)	(Poland) Lotos Trefl Gdańsk
3	Dawid Konarski	31 August 1989	1.98 m (6 ft 6 in)	93 kg (205 lb)	353 cm (139 in)	320 cm (130 in)	(Poland) Asseco Resovia Rzeszów
4	Jakub Jarosz	10 February 1987	1.95 m (6 ft 5 in)	84 kg (185 lb)	353 cm (139 in)	328 cm (129 in)	(Poland) Transfer Bydgoszcz
5	Grzegorz Pająk	1 January 1987	1.96 m (6 ft 5 in)	86 kg (190 lb)	342 cm (135 in)	320 cm (130 in)	(Poland) Effector Kielce
6	Bartosz Kurek	29 August 1988	2.05 m (6 ft 9 in)	87 kg (192 lb)	352 cm (139 in)	326 cm (128 in)	(Italy) Cucine Lube Treia
7	Karol Kłos (c)	8 August 1989	2.01 m (6 ft 7 in)	87 kg (192 lb)	357 cm (141 in)	326 cm (128 in)	(Poland) PGE Skra Bełchatów
8	Andrzej Wrona	27 December 1988	2.05 m (6 ft 9 in)	95 kg (209 lb)	350 cm (140 in)	265 cm (104 in)	(Poland) PGE Skra Bełchatów
9	Bartłomiej Bołądź	28 September 1994	2.03 m (6 ft 8 in)	97 kg (214 lb)	360 cm (140 in)	335 cm (132 in)	(Poland) Cerrad Czarni Radom
10	Damian Wojtaszek (L)	7 September 1988	1.8 m (5 ft 11 in)	76 kg (168 lb)	330 cm (130 in)	301 cm (119 in)	(Poland) Jastrzębski Węgiel
11	Fabian Drzyzga	3 January 1990	1.96 m (6 ft 5 in)	90 kg (200 lb)	325 cm (128 in)	304 cm (120 in)	(Poland) Asseco Resovia Rzeszów
12	Grzegorz Łomacz	1 October 1987	1.87 m (6 ft 2 in)	80 kg (180 lb)	335 cm (132 in)	315 cm (124 in)	(Poland) MKS Cuprum Lubin
13	Michał Kubiak	23 February 1988	1.91 m (6 ft 3 in)	80 kg (180 lb)	328 cm (129 in)	312 cm (123 in)	(Turkey) Halkbank Ankara
14	Marcin Waliński	24 October 1990	1.95 m (6 ft 5 in)	85 kg (187 lb)	338 cm (133 in)	313 cm (123 in)	(Poland) Transfer Bydgoszcz
15	Piotr Gacek (L)	16 September 1978	1.85 m (6 ft 1 in)	78 kg (172 lb)	325 cm (128 in)	305 cm (120 in)	(Poland) Lotos Trefl Gdańsk
16	Michał Kędzierski	9 August 1994	1.94 m (6 ft 4 in)	86 kg (190 lb)	330 cm (130 in)	300 cm (120 in)	(Poland) Cerrad Czarni Radom
17	Paweł Zatorski (L)	21 June 1990	1.84 m (6 ft 0 in)	73 kg (161 lb)	328 cm (129 in)	304 cm (120 in)	(Poland) ZAKSA Kędzierzyn-Koźle
18	Marcin Możdżonek	9 February 1985	2.11 m (6 ft 11 in)	93 kg (205 lb)	358 cm (141 in)	338 cm (133 in)	(Turkey) Halkbank Ankara
19	Szymon Romać	1 October 1992	1.96 m (6 ft 5 in)	89 kg (196 lb)	336 cm (132 in)	309 cm (122 in)	(Poland) MKS Cuprum Lubin
20	Mateusz Mika	21 January 1991	2.06 m (6 ft 9 in)	86 kg (190 lb)	352 cm (139 in)	320 cm (130 in)	(Poland) Lotos Trefl Gdańsk
21	Rafał Buszek	28 April 1987	1.94 m (6 ft 4 in)	81 kg (179 lb)	345 cm (136 in)	327 cm (129 in)	(Poland) Asseco Resovia Rzeszów
22	Bartosz Bednorz	25 July 1994	2.01 m (6 ft 7 in)	84 kg (185 lb)	350 cm (140 in)	315 cm (124 in)	(Poland) Indykpol AZS Olsztyn
23	Mateusz Bieniek	5 April 1994	2.1 m (6 ft 11 in)	98 kg (216 lb)	351 cm (138 in)	326 cm (128 in)	(Poland) Effector Kielce
24	Aleksander Śliwka	24 May 1995	1.94 m (6 ft 4 in)	78 kg (172 lb)	337 cm (133 in)	321 cm (126 in)	(Poland) AZS Politechnika Warszawska
25	Artur Szalpuk	20 March 1995	2 m (6 ft 7 in)	85 kg (187 lb)	345 cm (136 in)	319 cm (126 in)	(Poland) AZS Politechnika Warszawska

==== Russia ====
The following is the Russian roster in the 2015 FIVB Volleyball World League.

Head coach: Andrey Voronkov

No.	Name	Date of birth	Height	Weight	Spike	Block	2015 club
1	Sergey Antipkin	28 March 1986	1.97 m (6 ft 6 in)	92 kg (203 lb)	335 cm (132 in)	323 cm (127 in)	(Russia) Gazprom-Ugra Surgut
2	Denis Biryukov	12 December 1988	2.02 m (6 ft 8 in)	93 kg (205 lb)	352 cm (139 in)	324 cm (128 in)	(Russia) VC Dynamo Moscow
3	Pavel Kruglov	9 September 1985	2.05 m (6 ft 9 in)	98 kg (216 lb)	351 cm (138 in)	342 cm (135 in)	(Russia) VC Dynamo Moscow
4	Artem Volvich	22 January 1990	2.08 m (6 ft 10 in)	96 kg (212 lb)	350 cm (140 in)	330 cm (130 in)	(Russia) Lokomotiv Novosibirsk
5	Sergey Grankin	21 January 1985	1.95 m (6 ft 5 in)	96 kg (212 lb)	351 cm (138 in)	320 cm (130 in)	(Russia) VC Dynamo Moscow
6	Evgeny Sivozhelez	6 August 1986	1.96 m (6 ft 5 in)	90 kg (200 lb)	330 cm (130 in)	320 cm (130 in)	(Russia) VC Zenit Kazan
7	Nikolay Pavlov	22 May 1982	1.96 m (6 ft 5 in)	93 kg (205 lb)	342 cm (135 in)	321 cm (126 in)	(Russia) VC Gubernia
8	Sergey Tetyukhin	23 September 1975	1.97 m (6 ft 6 in)	89 kg (196 lb)	345 cm (136 in)	338 cm (133 in)	(Russia) Belogorie Belgorod
9	Aleksey Spiridonov	26 June 1988	1.96 m (6 ft 5 in)	96 kg (212 lb)	347 cm (137 in)	328 cm (129 in)	(Russia) VC Zenit Kazan
10	Sergey Savin	7 October 1988	2.01 m (6 ft 7 in)	92 kg (203 lb)	343 cm (135 in)	325 cm (128 in)	(Russia) VC Gubernia
11	Andrey Ashchev (c)	10 May 1983	2.02 m (6 ft 8 in)	105 kg (231 lb)	350 cm (140 in)	338 cm (133 in)	(Russia) VC Zenit Kazan
12	Alexander Butko	18 March 1986	1.98 m (6 ft 6 in)	97 kg (214 lb)	339 cm (133 in)	327 cm (129 in)	(Russia) Lokomotiv Novosibirsk
13	Dmitriy Muserskiy	29 October 1988	2.18 m (7 ft 2 in)	104 kg (229 lb)	375 cm (148 in)	347 cm (137 in)	(Russia) Belogorie Belgorod
14	Alexander Abrosimov	25 August 1983	2.07 m (6 ft 9 in)	98 kg (216 lb)	341 cm (134 in)	325 cm (128 in)	(Russia) Lokomotiv Novosibirsk
15	Dmitriy Ilinykh	31 January 1987	2.01 m (6 ft 7 in)	92 kg (203 lb)	338 cm (133 in)	330 cm (130 in)	(Russia) Belogorie Belgorod
16	Alexey Verbov (L)	31 January 1982	1.83 m (6 ft 0 in)	79 kg (174 lb)	315 cm (124 in)	310 cm (120 in)	(Russia) VC Zenit Kazan
17	Maxim Mikhaylov	19 March 1988	2.02 m (6 ft 8 in)	103 kg (227 lb)	345 cm (136 in)	330 cm (130 in)	(Russia) VC Zenit Kazan
18	Pavel Moroz	26 February 1987	2.05 m (6 ft 9 in)	105 kg (231 lb)	352 cm (139 in)	343 cm (135 in)	(Russia) Lokomotiv Novosibirsk
19	Igor Kolodinsky	7 July 1983	1.94 m (6 ft 4 in)	92 kg (203 lb)	340 cm (130 in)	325 cm (128 in)	(Russia) Fakel Novy Urengoy
20	Alexey Obmochaev (L)	22 May 1989	1.88 m (6 ft 2 in)	80 kg (180 lb)	325 cm (128 in)	310 cm (120 in)	(Russia) VC Dynamo Moscow
21	Roman Bragin	17 April 1987	1.87 m (6 ft 2 in)	82 kg (181 lb)	320 cm (130 in)	305 cm (120 in)	(Russia) Belogorie Belgorod
22	Alexander Markin	28 July 1990	1.96 m (6 ft 5 in)	94 kg (207 lb)	340 cm (130 in)	325 cm (128 in)	(Russia) VC Dynamo Moscow
23	Ilia Vlasov	3 August 1995	2.12 m (6 ft 11 in)	98 kg (216 lb)	360 cm (140 in)	345 cm (136 in)	(Russia) Fakel Novy Urengoy
24	Artem Smoliar	4 February 1985	2.09 m (6 ft 10 in)	97 kg (214 lb)	362 cm (143 in)	343 cm (135 in)	(Russia) Belogorie Belgorod
25	Roman Martynyuk	13 April 1987	1.82 m (6 ft 0 in)	75 kg (165 lb)	320 cm (130 in)	310 cm (120 in)	(Russia) Fakel Novy Urengoy

==== United States ====
The following is the United States roster in the 2015 FIVB Volleyball World League.

Head coach: (United States) John Speraw

No.	Name	Date of birth	Height	Weight	Spike	Block	2015 club
1	Matthew Anderson	18 April 1987	2.08 m (6 ft 10 in)	100 kg (220 lb)	360 cm (140 in)	332 cm (131 in)	(Russia) Zenit Kazan
2	Aaron Russell	4 June 1993	2.05 m (6 ft 9 in)	98 kg (216 lb)	356 cm (140 in)	337 cm (133 in)	(United States) Pennsylvania State University
3	Taylor Sander	17 March 1992	1.96 m (6 ft 5 in)	80 kg (180 lb)	345 cm (136 in)	320 cm (130 in)	(Italy) Blu Volley Verona
4	David Lee (c)	8 March 1982	2.03 m (6 ft 8 in)	105 kg (231 lb)	350 cm (140 in)	325 cm (128 in)	(Russia) Lokomotiv Novosibirsk
5	Ryan Ammerman	30 December 1985	2.05 m (6 ft 9 in)	90 kg (200 lb)	340 cm (130 in)	330 cm (130 in)	
6	Paul Lotman	3 November 1985	2.00 m (6 ft 7 in)	102 kg (225 lb)	336 cm (132 in)	312 cm (123 in)	(Poland) Asseco Resovia Rzeszów
7	Kawika Shoji	11 November 1987	1.90 m (6 ft 3 in)	79 kg (174 lb)	331 cm (130 in)	315 cm (124 in)	(Germany) SCC Berlin
8	Reid Priddy	1 October 1977	1.94 m (6 ft 4 in)	89 kg (196 lb)	353 cm (139 in)	330 cm (130 in)	
9	Murphy Troy	31 May 1989	2.02 m (6 ft 8 in)	99 kg (218 lb)	360 cm (140 in)	350 cm (140 in)	(Poland) Lotos Trefl Gdańsk
10	Thomas Jaeschke	4 September 1993	1.98 m (6 ft 6 in)	84 kg (185 lb)	348 cm (137 in)	330 cm (130 in)	(United States) Loyola University Chicago
11	Micah Christenson	8 June 1993	1.98 m (6 ft 6 in)	88 kg (194 lb)	349 cm (137 in)	340 cm (130 in)	(United States) University of Southern California
12	Russell Holmes	1 July 1982	2.05 m (6 ft 9 in)	95 kg (209 lb)	352 cm (139 in)	335 cm (132 in)	(Poland) Asseco Resovia Rzeszów
13	Vaafuti Tavana	25 September 1987	2.00 m (6 ft 7 in)	110 kg (240 lb)	360 cm (140 in)	340 cm (130 in)	(Indonesia) Jakarta BNI 46
14	Torey Defalco	10 April 1997	1.93 m (6 ft 4 in)	82 kg (181 lb)	328 cm (129 in)	302 cm (119 in)	(United States) Huntington Beach Club
15	Carson Clark	20 January 1989	2.05 m (6 ft 9 in)	93 kg (205 lb)	365 cm (144 in)	360 cm (140 in)	(Greece) Olympiacos
16	Jayson Jablonsky	23 July 1985	1.98 m (6 ft 6 in)	91 kg (201 lb)	345 cm (136 in)	335 cm (132 in)	(China) Fujian
17	Maxwell Holt	12 March 1987	2.05 m (6 ft 9 in)	90 kg (200 lb)	351 cm (138 in)	333 cm (131 in)	(Russia) Dynamo Moscow
18	Garrett Muagututia	26 February 1988	2.05 m (6 ft 9 in)	92 kg (203 lb)	359 cm (141 in)	345 cm (136 in)	(China) Fujian
19	Alfredo Reft	15 December 1982	1.78 m (5 ft 10 in)	83 kg (183 lb)	319 cm (126 in)	309 cm (122 in)	(France) Tours VB
20	David Smith	15 May 1985	2.01 m (6 ft 7 in)	86 kg (190 lb)	348 cm (137 in)	314 cm (124 in)	
21	Dustin Watten (L)	27 October 1986	1.82 m (6 ft 0 in)	80 kg (180 lb)	306 cm (120 in)	295 cm (116 in)	(France) GFCO Ajaccio
22	Erik Shoji (L)	24 August 1989	1.83 m (6 ft 0 in)	83 kg (183 lb)	330 cm (130 in)	321 cm (126 in)	(Germany) SCC Berlin
23	William Price	7 October 1987	2.01 m (6 ft 7 in)	94 kg (207 lb)	370 cm (150 in)	360 cm (140 in)	(China) Baic Motor
24	Daniel Mcdonnell	15 September 1988	2.00 m (6 ft 7 in)	90 kg (200 lb)	355 cm (140 in)	345 cm (136 in)	(France) Tours VB
25	Graham McIlvaine	2 August 1992	2.02 m (6 ft 8 in)	91 kg (201 lb)	342 cm (135 in)	330 cm (130 in)	(Denmark) Marienlyst

== Group 2 ==
=== Pool C ===
==== Argentina ====
The following is the Argentine roster in the 2015 FIVB Volleyball World League.

Head coach: Julio Velasco

No.	Name	Date of birth	Height	Weight	Spike	Block	2015 club
1	Nicolas Bruno	24 February 1989	1.88 m (6 ft 2 in)	84 kg (185 lb)	338 cm (133 in)	308 cm (121 in)	(Argentina) Personal Bolivar
2	Javier Filardi (c)	7 February 1980	1.90 m (6 ft 3 in)	89 kg (196 lb)	340 cm (130 in)	318 cm (125 in)	(Argentina) UPCN San Juan Volley
3	Maximiliano Chirivino	11 December 1989	1.78 m (5 ft 10 in)	84 kg (185 lb)	305 cm (120 in)	288 cm (113 in)	(Argentina) Boca Rio Uruguay Seg.
4	Sebastián Garrocq	27 November 1979	1.70 m (5 ft 7 in)	63 kg (139 lb)	320 cm (130 in)	302 cm (119 in)	(Argentina) UPCN San Juan Volley
5	Nicolás Uriarte	21 March 1990	1.92 m (6 ft 4 in)	82 kg (181 lb)	346 cm (136 in)	326 cm (128 in)	(Poland) PGE Skra Bełchatów
6	Cristian Poglajen	14 July 1989	1.95 m (6 ft 5 in)	93 kg (205 lb)	346 cm (136 in)	320 cm (130 in)	(Brazil) Montes Claros Vôlei
7	Facundo Conte	25 August 1989	1.98 m (6 ft 6 in)	90 kg (200 lb)	350 cm (140 in)	326 cm (128 in)	(Poland) PGE Skra Bełchatów
8	Demián González	21 February 1983	1.92 m (6 ft 4 in)	81 kg (179 lb)	328 cm (129 in)	318 cm (125 in)	(Argentina) UPCN San Juan Volley
9	Rodrigo Quiroga	23 March 1987	1.90 m (6 ft 3 in)	86 kg (190 lb)	345 cm (136 in)	321 cm (126 in)	(Brazil) Vôlei Canoas
10	José Luis González	27 December 1984	2.06 m (6 ft 9 in)	97 kg (214 lb)	350 cm (140 in)	333 cm (131 in)	(Poland) BBTS Bielsko-Biała
11	Sebastián Solé	12 June 1991	2.02 m (6 ft 8 in)	88 kg (194 lb)	350 cm (140 in)	328 cm (129 in)	(Italy) Energy T.I. Diatec Trentino
12	Federico Martina	2 November 1992	2.02 m (6 ft 8 in)	92 kg (203 lb)	350 cm (140 in)	320 cm (130 in)	(Argentina) Ciudad de Buenos Aires
13	Federico Franetovich	13 October 1991	2.00 m (6 ft 7 in)	90 kg (200 lb)	342 cm (135 in)	318 cm (125 in)	(Argentina) Buenos Aires Unidos
14	Pablo Crer	12 June 1989	2.05 m (6 ft 9 in)	78 kg (172 lb)	350 cm (140 in)	330 cm (130 in)	(Argentina) Personal Bolivar
15	Luciano De Cecco	2 June 1988	1.94 m (6 ft 4 in)	89 kg (196 lb)	333 cm (131 in)	315 cm (124 in)	(Italy) Sir Safety Perugia
16	Martín Ramos	26 August 1991	1.97 m (6 ft 6 in)	95 kg (209 lb)	340 cm (130 in)	315 cm (124 in)	(Argentina) UPCN San Juan Volley
17	Franco López	4 February 1989	1.87 m (6 ft 2 in)	79 kg (174 lb)	326 cm (128 in)	304 cm (120 in)	(Argentina) Club La Unión
18	Ezequiel Palacios	2 October 1992	2.02 m (6 ft 8 in)	89 kg (196 lb)	352 cm (139 in)	314 cm (124 in)	(Argentina) La Union de Formosa Club
19	Maximiliano Gauna	29 April 1989	1.97 m (6 ft 6 in)	93 kg (205 lb)	338 cm (133 in)	320 cm (130 in)	(Germany) Friedrichshafen Club
20	Pablo Guzman	6 April 1988	1.93 m (6 ft 4 in)	94 kg (207 lb)	350 cm (140 in)	335 cm (132 in)	(Argentina) Boca Rio Uruguay Seg.
21	Sebastián Closter (L)	13 May 1989	1.80 m (5 ft 11 in)	66 kg (146 lb)	296 cm (117 in)	278 cm (109 in)	(Argentina) Gigantes del Sur
22	Luciano Zornetta	6 March 1993	1.82 m (6 ft 0 in)	70 kg (150 lb)	342 cm (135 in)	312 cm (123 in)	(Argentina) Boca Rio Uruguay Seg.
23	Gonzalo Quiroga	25 February 1993	1.92 m (6 ft 4 in)	83 kg (183 lb)	336 cm (132 in)	310 cm (120 in)	(Italy) Tonazzo Padova
24	Facundo Santucci	6 March 1987	1.86 m (6 ft 1 in)	86 kg (190 lb)	326 cm (128 in)	296 cm (117 in)	(France) Toulouse Club
25	Rodrigo Villalba	8 April 1985	1.90 m (6 ft 3 in)	88 kg (194 lb)	350 cm (140 in)	335 cm (132 in)	(Argentina) Gigantes del Sur

==== Bulgaria ====
The following is the Bulgarian roster in the 2015 FIVB Volleyball World League.

Head coach: Plamen Konstantinov

No.	Name	Date of birth	Height	Weight	Spike	Block	2015 club
1	Georgi Bratoev	21 October 1987	2.02 m (6 ft 8 in)	88 kg (194 lb)	335 cm (132 in)	318 cm (125 in)	(Ukraine) Lokomotyv Kharkiv
2	Stanislav Petkov	31 December 1987	2.02 m (6 ft 8 in)	104 kg (229 lb)	355 cm (140 in)	345 cm (136 in)	(Romania) Tomis
3	Andrey Zhekov (c)	12 March 1980	1.90 m (6 ft 3 in)	82 kg (181 lb)	340 cm (130 in)	326 cm (128 in)	(Romania) Tomis
4	Martin Bozhilov	11 April 1988	1.90 m (6 ft 3 in)	82 kg (181 lb)	320 cm (130 in)	305 cm (120 in)	(Bulgaria) Marek Union Ivkoni
5	Svetoslav Gotsev	31 August 1990	2.05 m (6 ft 9 in)	97 kg (214 lb)	358 cm (141 in)	335 cm (132 in)	(Italy) Vero Volley Monza
6	Danail Milushev	3 February 1984	2.00 m (6 ft 7 in)	102 kg (225 lb)	360 cm (140 in)	340 cm (130 in)	(Japan) F.C.Tokyo
7	Miroslav Gradinarov	10 February 1985	2.03 m (6 ft 8 in)	91 kg (201 lb)	350 cm (140 in)	330 cm (130 in)	(France) TOAC TUC Toulouse
8	Todor Skrimov	9 January 1990	1.91 m (6 ft 3 in)	87 kg (192 lb)	348 cm (137 in)	330 cm (130 in)	(Italy) Top Volley Latina
9	Georgi Manchev	20 July 1990	0 m (0 in)	0 kg (0 lb)	0 cm (0 in)	0 cm (0 in)	
10	Valentin Bratoev	21 October 1987	2.03 m (6 ft 8 in)	92 kg (203 lb)	347 cm (137 in)	337 cm (133 in)	(France) GFC Ajaccio
11	Vladimir Nikolov	3 October 1977	2.00 m (6 ft 7 in)	95 kg (209 lb)	345 cm (136 in)	325 cm (128 in)	(France) ASU Lyon
12	Viktor Yosifov	16 October 1985	2.04 m (6 ft 8 in)	100 kg (220 lb)	350 cm (140 in)	340 cm (130 in)	(Russia) Guberniya
13	Teodor Salparov	16 August 1982	1.87 m (6 ft 2 in)	77 kg (170 lb)	320 cm (130 in)	305 cm (120 in)	(Russia) Zenit
14	Teodor Todorov	1 September 1989	2.08 m (6 ft 10 in)	94 kg (207 lb)	365 cm (144 in)	345 cm (136 in)	(Russia) Gazprom-Ugra Surgut
15	Todor Aleksiev	21 April 1983	2.04 m (6 ft 8 in)	105 kg (231 lb)	355 cm (140 in)	340 cm (130 in)	(Russia) Gazprom-Ugra Surgut
16	Vladislav Ivanov	14 March 1987	1.88 m (6 ft 2 in)	80 kg (180 lb)	320 cm (130 in)	310 cm (120 in)	(France) ASU Lyon
17	Nikolay Penchev	22 May 1992	1.97 m (6 ft 6 in)	87 kg (192 lb)	341 cm (134 in)	335 cm (132 in)	(Poland) Asseco Resovia
18	Nikolay Nikolov	29 July 1986	2.06 m (6 ft 9 in)	97 kg (214 lb)	350 cm (140 in)	332 cm (131 in)	(Iran) Shahrdari Urmia
19	Tsvetan Sokolov	31 December 1989	2.06 m (6 ft 9 in)	100 kg (220 lb)	370 cm (150 in)	350 cm (140 in)	(Turkey) Halkbank
20	Venelin Kadankov	31 August 1987	2.05 m (6 ft 9 in)	90 kg (200 lb)	335 cm (132 in)	315 cm (124 in)	(Turkey) Afyonkarahisar Genclik
21	Krasimir Georgiev	13 February 1995	2.03 m (6 ft 8 in)	83 kg (183 lb)	346 cm (136 in)	333 cm (131 in)	(Bulgaria) VC CSKA
22	Georgi Seganov	10 June 1993	1.98 m (6 ft 6 in)	83 kg (183 lb)	335 cm (132 in)	325 cm (128 in)	(Bulgaria) VC CSKA
23	Lubomir Agontsev	26 July 1987	1.90 m (6 ft 3 in)	87 kg (192 lb)	330 cm (130 in)	320 cm (130 in)	Montana Volley, Bulgaria
24	Martin Paliyski	2 October 1989	2.00 m (6 ft 7 in)	95 kg (209 lb)	338 cm (133 in)	330 cm (130 in)	(Bulgaria) Pirin Razlog
25	Borislav Apostolov	7 December 1990	2.08 m (6 ft 10 in)	97 kg (214 lb)	350 cm (140 in)	335 cm (132 in)	(Bulgaria) Marek Union Ivkoni

==== Canada ====
The following is the Canadian roster in the 2015 FIVB Volleyball World League.

Head coach: Glenn Hoag

No.	Name	Date of birth	Height	Weight	Spike	Block	2015 club
1	TJ Sanders	14 December 1991	1.91 m (6 ft 3 in)	81 kg (179 lb)	326 cm (128 in)	308 cm (121 in)	(Switzerland) PV Lugano
2	John Gordon Perrin	17 August 1989	2.01 m (6 ft 7 in)	95 kg (209 lb)	353 cm (139 in)	329 cm (130 in)	(Turkey) Arkas Sport Club
3	Daniel Lewis (L)	3 April 1976	1.89 m (6 ft 2 in)	86 kg (190 lb)	340 cm (130 in)	325 cm (128 in)	(France) Rennes
4	Joshua Howatson	7 October 1984	1.99 m (6 ft 6 in)	95 kg (209 lb)	346 cm (136 in)	325 cm (128 in)	Team Canada
5	Rudy Verhoeff	24 June 1989	1.98 m (6 ft 6 in)	88 kg (194 lb)	349 cm (137 in)	317 cm (125 in)	(France) GFC Ajaccio
6	Justin Duff	10 May 1988	2.02 m (6 ft 8 in)	94 kg (207 lb)	370 cm (150 in)	335 cm (132 in)	(Poland) Transfer Bydgoszcz
7	Braden Mclean	22 May 1991	2.08 m (6 ft 10 in)	110 kg (240 lb)	358 cm (141 in)	332 cm (131 in)	Team Canada
8	Adam Simac	9 August 1983	2.03 m (6 ft 8 in)	101 kg (223 lb)	348 cm (137 in)	336 cm (132 in)	(France) Asul Lyon Volley
9	Dustin Schneider	27 February 1985	1.82 m (6 ft 0 in)	82 kg (181 lb)	322 cm (127 in)	297 cm (117 in)	Team Canada
10	Toontje van Lankvelt	1 July 1984	1.97 m (6 ft 6 in)	91 kg (201 lb)	347 cm (137 in)	317 cm (125 in)	(France) ASUL Lyon Volley-Ball
11	Daniel Jansen Van Doorn	21 March 1990	2.07 m (6 ft 9 in)	98 kg (216 lb)	351 cm (138 in)	328 cm (129 in)	(France) SAEMS Tourcoing VB
12	Gavin Schmitt	27 January 1986	2.08 m (6 ft 10 in)	106 kg (234 lb)	372 cm (146 in)	340 cm (130 in)	(Turkey) Arkas Sport Club
13	Christopher Hoag	3 September 1988	1.92 m (6 ft 4 in)	79 kg (174 lb)	335 cm (132 in)	317 cm (125 in)	(Turkey) Bornova Anadolu Lisesi Spor
14	Max Burt	25 July 1988	2.07 m (6 ft 9 in)	101 kg (223 lb)	350 cm (140 in)	327 cm (129 in)	(France) Nantes Rezé Métropole Volley
15	Fred Winters (c)	25 September 1982	1.95 m (6 ft 5 in)	98 kg (216 lb)	359 cm (141 in)	327 cm (129 in)	(Brazil) Sada Cruisero Volei
16	Jason Derocco	19 September 1989	1.98 m (6 ft 6 in)	94 kg (207 lb)	342 cm (135 in)	318 cm (125 in)	(Turkey) Afyonkarahisar Belediyesi
17	Graham Vigrass	17 June 1989	2.05 m (6 ft 9 in)	97 kg (214 lb)	354 cm (139 in)	330 cm (130 in)	(Tunisia) Etoile Sportive du Sahel
18	Nicholas Hoag	19 August 1992	2.00 m (6 ft 7 in)	91 kg (201 lb)	342 cm (135 in)	322 cm (127 in)	(France) Tours VB
19	Blair Cameron Bann	26 February 1988	1.84 m (6 ft 0 in)	84 kg (185 lb)	314 cm (124 in)	295 cm (116 in)	(Germany) SWD Powervolleys Düren
20	Ciaran Mcgovern	5 June 1989	1.81 m (5 ft 11 in)	80 kg (180 lb)	336 cm (132 in)	312 cm (123 in)	(Germany) SWD Powervolleys Düren
21	Jay Blankenau	27 September 1989	1.94 m (6 ft 4 in)	94 kg (207 lb)	334 cm (131 in)	307 cm (121 in)	Team Canada
22	Steven Marshall	23 November 1989	1.89 m (6 ft 2 in)	79 kg (174 lb)	350 cm (140 in)	322 cm (127 in)	(Poland) Transfer Bydgoszcz
23	Christopher Voth	27 September 1990	1.97 m (6 ft 6 in)	81 kg (179 lb)	347 cm (137 in)	315 cm (124 in)	(Netherlands) Lycurgus
24	Lucas Van Berkel	29 November 1991	2.10 m (6 ft 11 in)	108 kg (238 lb)	350 cm (140 in)	326 cm (128 in)	(Sweden) Team Valla
25	Casey Adam Schouten	29 March 1994	1.94 m (6 ft 4 in)	95 kg (209 lb)	341 cm (134 in)	311 cm (122 in)	Team Canada

==== Cuba ====
The following is the Cuban roster in the 2015 FIVB Volleyball World League.

Head coach: Rodolfo Sánchez

No.	Name	Date of birth	Height	Weight	Spike	Block	2015 club
1	Yosvani Gonzalez	18 April 1988	1.96 m (6 ft 5 in)	85 kg (187 lb)	345 cm (136 in)	330 cm (130 in)	(Cuba) La Habana
2	Inovel Romero	28 January 1995	1.97 m (6 ft 6 in)	80 kg (180 lb)	350 cm (140 in)	335 cm (132 in)	(Cuba) Ciego de Ávila
3	Ricardo Calvo	2 October 1996	1.93 m (6 ft 4 in)	74 kg (163 lb)	343 cm (135 in)	334 cm (131 in)	(Cuba) Villa Clara
4	Javier Jiménez	16 November 1989	1.98 m (6 ft 6 in)	89 kg (196 lb)	352 cm (139 in)	346 cm (136 in)	(Greece) P.A.O.K. Thessaloniki
5	Leandro Macías	13 February 1990	1.92 m (6 ft 4 in)	70 kg (150 lb)	325 cm (128 in)	318 cm (125 in)	Santiago de Cuba
6	Osniel Rendon	26 October 1996	2.02 m (6 ft 8 in)	90 kg (200 lb)	350 cm (140 in)	340 cm (130 in)	(Cuba) Matanzas
7	Yonder Garcia	26 February 1993	1.83 m (6 ft 0 in)	78 kg (172 lb)	325 cm (128 in)	320 cm (130 in)	(Cuba) Ciudad Habana
8	Rolando Cepeda (c)	13 March 1989	1.98 m (6 ft 6 in)	77 kg (170 lb)	359 cm (141 in)	344 cm (135 in)	(Cuba) S.Spiritus
9	Liván Osoria	5 February 1994	2.01 m (6 ft 7 in)	96 kg (212 lb)	345 cm (136 in)	325 cm (128 in)	(Greece) P.A.O.K. Thessaloniki
10	Miguel Gutierrez	21 February 1997	1.97 m (6 ft 6 in)	86 kg (190 lb)	340 cm (130 in)	355 cm (140 in)	(Cuba) Villa Clara
11	Lazaro Fundora	13 February 1994	1.95 m (6 ft 5 in)	90 kg (200 lb)	344 cm (135 in)	317 cm (125 in)	(Cuba) La Habana
12	Abrahan Alfonso Gavilán	23 February 1995	1.97 m (6 ft 6 in)	72 kg (159 lb)	343 cm (135 in)	320 cm (130 in)	(Cuba) La Habana
13	Mario Rivera	26 October 1982	1.80 m (5 ft 11 in)	92 kg (203 lb)	343 cm (135 in)	323 cm (127 in)	(Cuba) Pinar del Rio
14	Osmany Uriarte	4 June 1995	1.97 m (6 ft 6 in)	81 kg (179 lb)	352 cm (139 in)	348 cm (137 in)	(Cuba) Sancti Spíritus
15	Dariel Albo	17 January 1992	2.01 m (6 ft 7 in)	82 kg (181 lb)	343 cm (135 in)	316 cm (124 in)	(Cuba) La Habana
16	Luis Sosa	18 May 1995	1.96 m (6 ft 5 in)	76 kg (168 lb)	345 cm (136 in)	320 cm (130 in)	(Cuba) Mayabeque
17	Félix Chapman	5 October 1996	1.98 m (6 ft 6 in)	84 kg (185 lb)	350 cm (140 in)	330 cm (130 in)	(Cuba) Mayabeque
18	Denny Hernandez	24 February 1994	1.90 m (6 ft 3 in)	85 kg (187 lb)	344 cm (135 in)	321 cm (126 in)	(Cuba) Pinar del Rio
19	Lionnis Salazar	25 July 1997	1.85 m (6 ft 1 in)	77 kg (170 lb)	332 cm (131 in)	332 cm (131 in)	Santiago de Cuba
20	Javiel Montes De Oca	12 September 1997	2.00 m (6 ft 7 in)	89 kg (196 lb)	346 cm (136 in)	340 cm (130 in)	(Cuba) Mayabeque
21	Adrian Goide	26 June 1998	1.91 m (6 ft 3 in)	80 kg (180 lb)	344 cm (135 in)	340 cm (130 in)	(Cuba) Sancti Spíritus
22	Luis Estrada	10 March 2000	1.99 m (6 ft 6 in)	90 kg (200 lb)	350 cm (140 in)	325 cm (128 in)	(Cuba) La Habana

=== Pool D ===
==== Czech Republic ====
The following is the Czech roster in the 2015 FIVB Volleyball World League.

Head coach: Zdeněk Šmejkal

No.	Name	Date of birth	Height	Weight	Spike	Block	2015 club
1	Jakub Veselý	2 September 1986	2.07 m (6 ft 9 in)	100 kg (220 lb)	356 cm (140 in)	340 cm (130 in)	(France) St. Nazaire V. B. Atlantique
2	Zdeněk Haník	11 July 1986	1.78 m (5 ft 10 in)	80 kg (180 lb)	330 cm (130 in)	315 cm (124 in)	(Switzerland) Volley Amriswil
3	Radek Mach	28 September 1984	2.06 m (6 ft 9 in)	105 kg (231 lb)	344 cm (135 in)	333 cm (131 in)	(Czech Republic) VK Ceske Budejovice
4	Daniel Pfeffer	27 April 1990	1.84 m (6 ft 0 in)	80 kg (180 lb)	331 cm (130 in)	322 cm (127 in)	(Czech Republic) VK Karlovarsko
5	Jiří Král	8 July 1981	2.02 m (6 ft 8 in)	101 kg (223 lb)	356 cm (140 in)	331 cm (130 in)	(France) Beauvais Oise Universite Club
6	Karel Linz	20 April 1986	2.00 m (6 ft 7 in)	92 kg (203 lb)	349 cm (137 in)	331 cm (130 in)	(France) Rennes Volley
7	Aleš Holubec (c)	13 March 1984	1.99 m (6 ft 6 in)	90 kg (200 lb)	357 cm (141 in)	335 cm (132 in)	(France) UGS Nantes Reze M. V.
8	Filip Habr	27 April 1988	2.01 m (6 ft 7 in)	92 kg (203 lb)	348 cm (137 in)	335 cm (132 in)	(Czech Republic) VK Ceske Budejovice
9	Pavel Bartoš	20 April 1994	1.91 m (6 ft 3 in)	79 kg (174 lb)	335 cm (132 in)	325 cm (128 in)	(Czech Republic) VSC Zlin
10	Michal Finger	2 September 1993	2.01 m (6 ft 7 in)	91 kg (201 lb)	363 cm (143 in)	341 cm (134 in)	(Germany) VfB Friedrichshafen
11	Martin Kryštof	11 October 1982	1.79 m (5 ft 10 in)	78 kg (172 lb)	310 cm (120 in)	300 cm (120 in)	(Germany) Berlin Recycling Volleys
12	Jiří Vašíček	11 June 1992	1.91 m (6 ft 3 in)	80 kg (180 lb)	335 cm (132 in)	325 cm (128 in)	(Czech Republic) VSC Zlin
13	Kamil Baránek	2 May 1983	1.98 m (6 ft 6 in)	93 kg (205 lb)	350 cm (140 in)	335 cm (132 in)	(Turkey) Galatasaray Istanbul
14	Adam Bartoš	27 April 1992	1.98 m (6 ft 6 in)	85 kg (187 lb)	350 cm (140 in)	330 cm (130 in)	(France) Tours VB
15	Jan Štokr	16 January 1983	2.05 m (6 ft 9 in)	113 kg (249 lb)	368 cm (145 in)	348 cm (137 in)	(Russia) Dinamo Krasnodar
16	Tomas Široký	26 October 1982	1.96 m (6 ft 5 in)	100 kg (220 lb)	348 cm (137 in)	325 cm (128 in)	(Czech Republic) VK Ostrava
17	David Konečný	10 October 1982	1.93 m (6 ft 4 in)	95 kg (209 lb)	350 cm (140 in)	330 cm (130 in)	(France) Tours VB
18	Michal Kriško	23 November 1988	2.00 m (6 ft 7 in)	93 kg (205 lb)	356 cm (140 in)	330 cm (130 in)	(Czech Republic) VK Ceske Budejovice
19	Petr Michálek	19 August 1989	1.90 m (6 ft 3 in)	80 kg (180 lb)	344 cm (135 in)	325 cm (128 in)	(Czech Republic) VK Ceske Budejovice
20	Vladimír Sobotka	7 May 1985	2.03 m (6 ft 8 in)	93 kg (205 lb)	350 cm (140 in)	328 cm (129 in)	(Czech Republic) VK Ceske Budejovice
21	Marek Beer	24 May 1988	2.01 m (6 ft 7 in)	101 kg (223 lb)	354 cm (139 in)	334 cm (131 in)	(Austria) Hypo Tirol Innsbruck
22	Tomáš Fila	12 July 1985	1.98 m (6 ft 6 in)	95 kg (209 lb)	348 cm (137 in)	320 cm (130 in)	(Czech Republic) VK Ceske Budejovice
23	Donovan Dzavoronok	23 May 1997	2.03 m (6 ft 8 in)	95 kg (209 lb)	348 cm (137 in)	337 cm (133 in)	(Czech Republic) CZU Praha
24	Jakub Janouch	13 June 1990	1.94 m (6 ft 4 in)	88 kg (194 lb)	335 cm (132 in)	325 cm (128 in)	(Czech Republic) VK Dukla Liberec
25	Jan Václavík	15 April 1985	1.80 m (5 ft 11 in)	73 kg (161 lb)	315 cm (124 in)	295 cm (116 in)	(Czech Republic) VK Ostrava

==== France ====
The following is the French roster in the 2015 FIVB Volleyball World League.

Head coach: Laurent Tillie

No.	Name	Date of birth	Height	Weight	Spike	Block	2015 club
1	Jonas Aguenier	28 April 1992	2.02 m (6 ft 8 in)	92 kg (203 lb)	340 cm (130 in)	310 cm (120 in)	(France) AS Cannes
2	Jenia Grebennikov	13 August 1990	1.88 m (6 ft 2 in)	85 kg (187 lb)	345 cm (136 in)	330 cm (130 in)	(Germany) Friedrichshafen
3	Médéric Henry	20 June 1995	2.12 m (6 ft 11 in)	106 kg (234 lb)	345 cm (136 in)	327 cm (129 in)	(France) Arago de Sète
4	Antonin Rouzier	18 August 1986	2.01 m (6 ft 7 in)	100 kg (220 lb)	350 cm (140 in)	330 cm (130 in)	(Turkey) Ankara
5	Trevor Clevenot	28 June 1994	1.99 m (6 ft 6 in)	89 kg (196 lb)	335 cm (132 in)	316 cm (124 in)	(France) TOAC TUC
6	Benjamin Toniutti (c)	30 October 1989	1.83 m (6 ft 0 in)	72 kg (159 lb)	320 cm (130 in)	300 cm (120 in)	(Germany) Friedrichshafen
7	Kevin Tillie	2 November 1990	2.00 m (6 ft 7 in)	85 kg (187 lb)	345 cm (136 in)	325 cm (128 in)	(Turkey) Izmir
8	Yoann Joumel	16 September 1987	1.83 m (6 ft 0 in)	76 kg (168 lb)	320 cm (130 in)	303 cm (119 in)	(France) GFCA Ajaccio
9	Earvin N'Gapeth	12 February 1991	1.94 m (6 ft 4 in)	93 kg (205 lb)	358 cm (141 in)	327 cm (129 in)	(Italy) Modèna
10	Kevin Le Roux	11 May 1989	2.09 m (6 ft 10 in)	95 kg (209 lb)	365 cm (144 in)	345 cm (136 in)	(South Korea) Cheonan
11	Julien Ryneel	15 April 1990	1.92 m (6 ft 4 in)	88 kg (194 lb)	345 cm (136 in)	325 cm (128 in)	(France) Montpelier UC
12	Ludovic Castard	18 January 1983	1.97 m (6 ft 6 in)	95 kg (209 lb)	348 cm (137 in)	325 cm (128 in)	(France) AS Cannes
13	Pierre Pujol	13 July 1984	1.86 m (6 ft 1 in)	90 kg (200 lb)	335 cm (132 in)	310 cm (120 in)	(France) AS Cannes
14	Nikolas Le Goff	15 February 1992	2.06 m (6 ft 9 in)	114 kg (251 lb)	365 cm (144 in)	328 cm (129 in)	(France) Montpelier UC
15	Quentin Jouffroy	5 July 1993	2.02 m (6 ft 8 in)	100 kg (220 lb)	345 cm (136 in)	325 cm (128 in)	(France) ASUN Lyon VB
16	Nikolas Marechal	4 March 1987	1.98 m (6 ft 6 in)	93 kg (205 lb)	338 cm (133 in)	327 cm (129 in)	(Poland) Skra Belchatov
17	Franck Lafitte	8 March 1989	2.03 m (6 ft 8 in)	95 kg (209 lb)	350 cm (140 in)	330 cm (130 in)	(France) Montpelier UC
18	Thibault Rossard	28 August 1993	1.92 m (6 ft 4 in)	85 kg (187 lb)	350 cm (140 in)	320 cm (130 in)	(France) TOAC TUC
19	Guillaume Quesque	29 April 1989	2.04 m (6 ft 8 in)	87 kg (192 lb)	350 cm (140 in)	325 cm (128 in)	(Poland) Jastrzębski Węgiel
20	Nicolas Rossard	23 May 1990	1.83 m (6 ft 0 in)	64 kg (141 lb)	315 cm (124 in)	305 cm (120 in)	(France) Arago de Sète
21	Mory Sidibe	17 June 1987	1.93 m (6 ft 4 in)	92 kg (203 lb)	367 cm (144 in)	330 cm (130 in)	(China) Chengdu
22	Hubert Henno	6 October 1976	1.88 m (6 ft 2 in)	83 kg (183 lb)	330 cm (130 in)	310 cm (120 in)	(Italy) Lube Banca Macerata
23	Toafa Takaniko	29 May 1985	1.94 m (6 ft 4 in)	92 kg (203 lb)	340 cm (130 in)	330 cm (130 in)	(France) Arago de Sète
24	Baptiste Gelier	12 March 1987	1.98 m (6 ft 6 in)	93 kg (205 lb)	335 cm (132 in)	318 cm (125 in)	(Germany) Friedrichshafen
25	Philippe Tuitoga	18 December 1990	1.98 m (6 ft 6 in)	86 kg (190 lb)	352 cm (139 in)	335 cm (132 in)	(France) TOAC TUC

==== Japan ====
The following is the Japanese roster in the 2015 FIVB Volleyball World League.

Head coach: Masashi Nambu

No.	Name	Date of birth	Height	Weight	Spike	Block	2015 club
1	Kunihiro Shimizu (c)	11 August 1986	1.92 m (6 ft 4 in)	97 kg (214 lb)	345 cm (136 in)	335 cm (132 in)	(Japan) Panasonic Panthers
2	Daisuke Sakai	22 October 1981	1.80 m (5 ft 11 in)	75 kg (165 lb)	320 cm (130 in)	305 cm (120 in)	(Japan) JVA
3	Kentaro Takahashi	8 February 1995	2.00 m (6 ft 7 in)	93 kg (205 lb)	345 cm (136 in)	330 cm (130 in)	(Japan) University of Tsukuba
4	Koichiro Koga	30 August 1984	1.71 m (5 ft 7 in)	75 kg (165 lb)	310 cm (120 in)	300 cm (120 in)	(Japan) Toyoda Gosei Trefuerza
5	Yoshifumi Suzuki	31 March 1983	2.00 m (6 ft 7 in)	93 kg (205 lb)	340 cm (130 in)	300 cm (120 in)	(Japan) Suntory Sunbirds
6	Akihiro Fukatsu	23 July 1987	1.83 m (6 ft 0 in)	68 kg (150 lb)	334 cm (131 in)	315 cm (124 in)	(Japan) JT Thunders
7	Masashi Kuriyama	14 July 1988	1.89 m (6 ft 2 in)	85 kg (187 lb)	340 cm (130 in)	330 cm (130 in)	(Japan) Suntory Sunbirds
8	Yūki Ishikawa	11 December 1995	1.91 m (6 ft 3 in)	75 kg (165 lb)	345 cm (136 in)	330 cm (130 in)	(Japan) Chuo University
9	Yuta Abe	8 August 1981	1.91 m (6 ft 3 in)	85 kg (187 lb)	342 cm (135 in)	320 cm (130 in)	(Japan) Suntory Sunbirds
10	Daisuke Yako	7 October 1988	1.94 m (6 ft 4 in)	89 kg (196 lb)	335 cm (132 in)	325 cm (128 in)	(Japan) JT Thunders
11	Takaaki Tomimatsu	20 July 1984	1.92 m (6 ft 4 in)	85 kg (187 lb)	350 cm (140 in)	330 cm (130 in)	(Japan) Toray Arrows
12	Akihiro Yamaguchi	30 November 1993	2.04 m (6 ft 8 in)	72 kg (159 lb)	348 cm (137 in)}	328 cm (129 in)	(Japan) Aichi Gakuin University
13	Hideomi Fukatsu	1 June 1990	1.80 m (5 ft 11 in)	70 kg (150 lb)	330 cm (130 in)	305 cm (120 in)	(Japan) Panasonic Panthers
14	Shunsuke Chijiki	6 September 1989	1.93 m (6 ft 4 in)	83 kg (183 lb)	348 cm (137 in)	330 cm (130 in)	(Japan) Sakai Blazers
15	Masahiro Yanagida	6 July 1992	1.86 m (6 ft 1 in)	78 kg (172 lb)	335 cm (132 in)	305 cm (120 in)	(Japan) Suntory Sunbirds
16	Takashi Dekita	13 August 1991	1.99 m (6 ft 6 in)	90 kg (200 lb)	350 cm (140 in)	330 cm (130 in)	(Japan) Sakai Blazers
17	Takeshi Nagano	11 July 1985	1.76 m (5 ft 9 in)	69 kg (152 lb)	315 cm (124 in)	300 cm (120 in)	(Japan) Panasonic Panthers
18	Yuki Suzuki	29 May 1997	2.01 m (6 ft 7 in)	75 kg (165 lb)	340 cm (130 in)	325 cm (128 in)	(Japan) Omonogawa High School
19	Hiroaki Asano	6 October 1990	1.78 m (5 ft 10 in)	69 kg (152 lb)	335 cm (132 in)	315 cm (124 in)	(Japan) JTEKT Stings
20	Sogo Watanabe	21 July 1990	1.96 m (6 ft 5 in)	83 kg (183 lb)	335 cm (132 in)	320 cm (130 in)	(Japan) Panasonic Panthers
21	Shunsuke Inoue	4 June 1985	1.90 m (6 ft 3 in)	78 kg (172 lb)	333 cm (131 in)	320 cm (130 in)	(Japan) JT Thunders
22	Yuta Matsuoka	6 November 1989	1.92 m (6 ft 4 in)	72 kg (159 lb)	335 cm (132 in)	325 cm (128 in)	(Japan) Sakai Blazers
23	Yuichiro Komiya	16 November 1992	1.92 m (6 ft 4 in)	83 kg (183 lb)	345 cm (136 in)	315 cm (124 in)	(Japan) Toray Arrows
24	Kenya Fujinaka	25 July 1993	1.90 m (6 ft 3 in)	80 kg (180 lb)	340 cm (130 in)	320 cm (130 in)	(Japan) Senshu University
25	Yasunari Kodama	24 July 1994	1.92 m (6 ft 4 in)	80 kg (180 lb)	336 cm (132 in)	305 cm (120 in)	(Japan) University of Tsukuba

==== South Korea ====
The following is the South Korean roster in the 2015 FIVB Volleyball World League.

Head Coach: Moon Yong-kwan

No.	Name	Date of birth	Height	Weight	Spike	Block	2015 club
1	Song Myung-Geun	12 March 1993	195 cm (6 ft 5 in)	85 kg (187 lb)	315 cm (124 in)	305 cm (120 in)	Ansan OK Savings Bank Rush & Cash
2	Shin Young-Soo	1 July 1982	197 cm (6 ft 6 in)	90 kg (200 lb)	335 cm (132 in)	313 cm (123 in)	Incheon Korean Air Jumbos
3	Kim Gwang-Guk	13 August 1987	188 cm (6 ft 2 in)	77 kg (170 lb)	305 cm (120 in)	300 cm (120 in)	Seoul Woori Card Hansae
4	Shin Yung-Suk (c)	4 October 1986	198 cm (6 ft 6 in)	90 kg (200 lb)	335 cm (132 in)	325 cm (128 in)	Sangmu
5	Kim Yo-han	16 August 1985	200 cm (6 ft 7 in)	95 kg (209 lb)	335 cm (132 in)	326 cm (128 in)	Gumi LIG Insurance Greaters
6	Lee Min-Gyu	3 December 1992	194 cm (6 ft 4 in)	78 kg (172 lb)	305 cm (120 in)	295 cm (116 in)	Ansan OK Savings Bank Rush & Cash
7	Lee Sun-Kyu	14 March 1981	199 cm (6 ft 6 in)	90 kg (200 lb)	325 cm (128 in)	320 cm (130 in)	Daejeon Samsung Bluefangs
8	Park Sang-Ha	4 April 1986	198 cm (6 ft 6 in)	89 kg (196 lb)	327 cm (129 in)	315 cm (124 in)	Sangmu
9	Kwak Seung-Suk	23 March 1988	190 cm (6 ft 3 in)	81 kg (179 lb)	325 cm (128 in)	320 cm (130 in)	Incheon Korean Air Jumbos
10	Bu Yong-Chan	30 November 1989	175 cm (5 ft 9 in)	65 kg (143 lb)	290 cm (110 in)	284 cm (112 in)	Gumi LIG Insurance Greaters
11	Choi Min-Ho	28 April 1988	198 cm (6 ft 6 in)	86 kg (190 lb)	330 cm (130 in)	312 cm (123 in)	Cheonan Hyundai Capital Skywalkers
12	Jeon Kwang-In	18 September 1991	194 cm (6 ft 4 in)	82 kg (181 lb)	310 cm (120 in)	300 cm (120 in)	Suwon KEPCO Vixtorm
13	Moon Sung-Min	14 September 1986	198 cm (6 ft 6 in)	89 kg (196 lb)	329 cm (130 in)	321 cm (126 in)	Cheonan Hyundai Capital Skywalkers
14	Song Hui-Chae	29 April 1992	191 cm (6 ft 3 in)	76 kg (168 lb)	305 cm (120 in)	295 cm (116 in)	Ansan OK Savings Bank Rush & Cash
15	Yoo Yoon-Sik	2 February 1989	198 cm (6 ft 6 in)	75 kg (165 lb)	310 cm (120 in)	300 cm (120 in)	Incheon Korean Air Jumbos
16	Choi Hong-Suk	26 June 1988	195 cm (6 ft 5 in)	80 kg (180 lb)	328 cm (129 in)	320 cm (130 in)	Seoul Woori Card Hansae
17	Seo Jae-Duck	21 July 1989	195 cm (6 ft 5 in)	98 kg (216 lb)	315 cm (124 in)	305 cm (120 in)	Suwon KEPCO Vixtorm
18	Ha Hyun-Yong	9 May 1982	198 cm (6 ft 6 in)	88 kg (194 lb)	330 cm (130 in)	322 cm (127 in)	Gumi LIG Insurance Greaters
19	Jeong Min-su	5 October 1991	178 cm (5 ft 10 in)	75 kg (165 lb)	270 cm (110 in)	250 cm (98 in)	Seoul Woori Card Hansae
20	Ji Tae-Hwan	5 June 1986	200 cm (6 ft 7 in)	89 kg (196 lb)	330 cm (130 in)	315 cm (124 in)	Daejeon Samsung Bluefangs
21	Kim Jeong-Hwan	23 March 1988	196 cm (6 ft 5 in)	94 kg (207 lb)	329 cm (130 in)	320 cm (130 in)	Seoul Woori Card Hansae
22	You Kwang-Woo	22 April 1985	185 cm (6 ft 1 in)	85 kg (187 lb)	311 cm (122 in)	300 cm (120 in)	Daejeon Samsung Bluefangs
23	Park Jin-Woo	18 March 1990	198 cm (6 ft 6 in)	78 kg (172 lb)	340 cm (130 in)	318 cm (125 in)	Seoul Woori Card Hansae
24	Kim Kyumin	28 December 1990	199 cm (6 ft 6 in)	92 kg (203 lb)	0 cm (0 in)	0 cm (0 in)	Ansan OK Savings Bank Rush & Cash
25	Oh Jae-Seong	2 April 1992	175 cm (5 ft 9 in)	60 kg (130 lb)	285 cm (112 in)	275 cm (108 in)	Suwon KEPCO Vixtorm

=== Pool E ===
==== Belgium ====
The following is the Belgian roster in the 2015 FIVB Volleyball World League.

Head Coach: Dominique Baeyens

No.	Name	Date of birth	Height	Weight	Spike	Block	2015 club
1	Bram Van Den Dries	14 August 1989	206 cm (6 ft 9 in)	101 kg (223 lb)	365 cm (144 in)	345 cm (136 in)	Maliye Milli Piyango Ankara
2	Jolan Cox	12 July 1991	194 cm (6 ft 4 in)	75 kg (165 lb)	340 cm (130 in)	320 cm (130 in)	Prefaxis Menen
3	Sam Deroo (c)	29 April 1992	202 cm (6 ft 8 in)	102 kg (225 lb)	360 cm (140 in)	350 cm (140 in)	Calzedonia Verona
4	Pieter Coolman	24 April 1989	200 cm (6 ft 7 in)	92 kg (203 lb)	348 cm (137 in)	332 cm (131 in)	Knack Roeselare
5	Lienert Cosemans	20 October 1993	203 cm (6 ft 8 in)	90 kg (200 lb)	340 cm (130 in)	315 cm (124 in)	Prefaxis Menen
6	Stijn Dejonckheere	21 January 1988	185 cm (6 ft 1 in)	75 kg (165 lb)	335 cm (132 in)	310 cm (120 in)	Knack Roeselare
7	Gertjan Claes	30 March 1985	191 cm (6 ft 3 in)	82 kg (181 lb)	339 cm (133 in)	310 cm (120 in)	Knack Roeselare
8	Kevin Klinkenberg	4 October 1990	198 cm (6 ft 6 in)	78 kg (172 lb)	356 cm (140 in)	330 cm (130 in)	Tours
9	Pieter Verhees	8 December 1989	205 cm (6 ft 9 in)	109 kg (240 lb)	356 cm (140 in)	342 cm (135 in)	Parmareggio Modena
10	Simon Van De Voorde	19 December 1989	208 cm (6 ft 10 in)	96 kg (212 lb)	360 cm (140 in)	340 cm (130 in)	Top Volley Latina
11	Matthijs Verhanneman	8 December 1988	198 cm (6 ft 6 in)	98 kg (216 lb)	350 cm (140 in)	340 cm (130 in)	Knack Roeselare
12	Gert Van Walle	7 August 1987	197 cm (6 ft 6 in)	87 kg (192 lb)	350 cm (140 in)	335 cm (132 in)	Beauvais
13	Dennis Deroey	14 August 1987	191 cm (6 ft 3 in)	84 kg (185 lb)	330 cm (130 in)	301 cm (119 in)	Topvolley Callant Antwerpen
14	Yves Kruyner	10 May 1990	193 cm (6 ft 4 in)	99 kg (218 lb)	318 cm (125 in)	310 cm (120 in)	Argex Duvel Puurs
15	Stijn D'Hulst	24 April 1991	187 cm (6 ft 2 in)	75 kg (165 lb)	327 cm (129 in)	308 cm (121 in)	Knack Roeselare
16	Matthias Valkiers	8 April 1990	194 cm (6 ft 4 in)	90 kg (200 lb)	342 cm (135 in)	320 cm (130 in)	Palendoken BLD Sports Club
17	Tomas Rousseaux	31 March 1994	199 cm (6 ft 6 in)	88 kg (194 lb)	355 cm (140 in)	338 cm (133 in)	Knack Roeselare
18	Seppe Baetens	13 February 1989	191 cm (6 ft 3 in)	87 kg (192 lb)	349 cm (137 in)	328 cm (129 in)	Volley Behappy2 Asse-Lennik
19	Martijn Colson	8 April 1994	203 cm (6 ft 8 in)	96 kg (212 lb)	357 cm (141 in)	335 cm (132 in)	Topvolley Callant Antwerpen
20	Arno Van De Velde	30 December 1995	210 cm (6 ft 11 in)	93 kg (205 lb)	356 cm (140 in)	350 cm (140 in)	Knack Roeselare
21	Francois Lecat	19 April 1993	200 cm (6 ft 7 in)	90 kg (200 lb)	348 cm (137 in)	333 cm (131 in)	Noliko Maaseik
22	Sander Depovere	8 January 1995	197 cm (6 ft 6 in)	82 kg (181 lb)	330 cm (130 in)	305 cm (120 in)	Topvolley Callant Antwerpen
23	Jelle Ribbens	17 March 1992	187 cm (6 ft 2 in)	76 kg (168 lb)	325 cm (128 in)	300 cm (120 in)	Maxéville Nancy
24	Lowie Stuer	24 November 1995	194 cm (6 ft 4 in)	82 kg (181 lb)	333 cm (131 in)	302 cm (119 in)	Topvolley Callant Antwerpen
25	Thomas Konings	7 March 1997	202 cm (6 ft 8 in)	94 kg (207 lb)	357 cm (141 in)	324 cm (128 in)	Topvolley Callant Antwerpen

==== Finland ====
The following is the Finnish roster in the 2015 FIVB Volleyball World League.

Head Coach: Tuomas Sammelvuo

No.	Name	Date of birth	Height	Weight	Spike	Block	2015 club
1	Ville Juntura	26 March 1988	192 cm (6 ft 4 in)	82 kg (181 lb)	330 cm (130 in)	315 cm (124 in)	Raision Loimu
2	Eemi Tervaportti	26 July 1989	193 cm (6 ft 4 in)	73 kg (161 lb)	338 cm (133 in)	317 cm (125 in)	Roeselare
3	Vili Kasper Vuorinen	22 April 1984	191 cm (6 ft 3 in)	84 kg (185 lb)	335 cm (132 in)	325 cm (128 in)	Javanheri Gonbad VC
4	Lauri Kerminen (L)	18 January 1993	182 cm (6 ft 0 in)	70 kg (150 lb)	320 cm (130 in)	290 cm (110 in)	Nantes
5	Antti Siltala (c)	14 March 1984	193 cm (6 ft 4 in)	90 kg (200 lb)	348 cm (137 in)	330 cm (130 in)	Jenisei Krasnojarsk
6	Niklas Seppänen	30 June 1993	192 cm (6 ft 4 in)	82 kg (181 lb)	335 cm (132 in)	320 cm (130 in)	Tourcoing Lille
7	Eemeli Kouki	26 October 1991	194 cm (6 ft 4 in)	84 kg (185 lb)	340 cm (130 in)	330 cm (130 in)	Hurrikaani-Loimaa
8	Elviss Krastins	15 September 1994	192 cm (6 ft 4 in)	84 kg (185 lb)	335 cm (132 in)	315 cm (124 in)	Vammalan Lentopallo
9	Tommi Siirilä	5 August 1993	203 cm (6 ft 8 in)	98 kg (216 lb)	340 cm (130 in)	325 cm (128 in)	Kokkolan Tiikerit
10	Urpo Sivula	15 March 1988	195 cm (6 ft 5 in)	100 kg (220 lb)	350 cm (140 in)	330 cm (130 in)	Raision Loimu
11	Sauli Sinkkonen	14 September 1989	201 cm (6 ft 7 in)	95 kg (209 lb)	345 cm (136 in)	330 cm (130 in)	Rantaperkiön Isku
12	Jan Helenius	13 October 1996	183 cm (6 ft 0 in)	74 kg (163 lb)	320 cm (130 in)	300 cm (120 in)	Rantaperkiön Isku
13	Mikko Oivanen	26 May 1986	198 cm (6 ft 6 in)	92 kg (203 lb)	360 cm (140 in)	320 cm (130 in)	Czarni Radom
14	Konstantin Shumov	15 February 1985	205 cm (6 ft 9 in)	98 kg (216 lb)	351 cm (138 in)	331 cm (130 in)	Treia
15	Matti Oivanen	26 May 1986	198 cm (6 ft 6 in)	90 kg (200 lb)	355 cm (140 in)	320 cm (130 in)	Hurrikaani-Loimaa
16	Olli-Pekka Ojansivu	31 December 1987	197 cm (6 ft 6 in)	90 kg (200 lb)	344 cm (135 in)	325 cm (128 in)	Kokkolan Tiikerit
17	Tuomas Koppanen	4 October 1993	197 cm (6 ft 6 in)	94 kg (207 lb)	345 cm (136 in)	340 cm (130 in)	Hurrikaani-Loimaa
18	Jukka Lehtonen	22 February 1982	197 cm (6 ft 6 in)	90 kg (200 lb)	346 cm (136 in)	325 cm (128 in)	LEKA Volley
19	Petteri Penttinen	21 August 1985	185 cm (6 ft 1 in)	88 kg (194 lb)	335 cm (132 in)	320 cm (130 in)	LEKA Volley
20	Samuli Kaislasalo	3 August 1995	204 cm (6 ft 8 in)	88 kg (194 lb)	350 cm (140 in)	325 cm (128 in)	Rantaperkiön Isku
21	Aleksi Mutka (L)	23 March 1995	182 cm (6 ft 0 in)	72 kg (159 lb)	315 cm (124 in)	300 cm (120 in)	Rantaperkiön Isku
22	Ossi Rumpunen	18 April 1989	187 cm (6 ft 2 in)	80 kg (180 lb)	338 cm (133 in)	320 cm (130 in)	Raision Loimu
23	Tomi Rumpunen	11 April 1987	194 cm (6 ft 4 in)	85 kg (187 lb)	340 cm (130 in)	322 cm (127 in)	Raision Loimu
24	Jesse Mäntylä (L)	24 March 1987	176 cm (5 ft 9 in)	70 kg (150 lb)	321 cm (126 in)	289 cm (114 in)	Hurrikaani-Loimaa
25	Toni Kankaanpää	18 March 1984	194 cm (6 ft 4 in)	89 kg (196 lb)	345 cm (136 in)	318 cm (125 in)	Korson Veto

==== Netherlands ====
The following is the Dutch roster in the 2015 FIVB Volleyball World League.

Head Coach: Gido Vermeulen

No.	Name	Date of birth	Height	Weight	Spike	Block	2015 club
1	Nimir Abdel-Aziz	5 February 1992	201 cm (6 ft 7 in)	86 kg (190 lb)	365 cm (144 in)	350 cm (140 in)	ZAKSA Kedzierzyn-Kozle
2	Yannick van Harskamp (c)	2 April 1986	190 cm (6 ft 3 in)	88 kg (194 lb)	335 cm (132 in)	316 cm (124 in)	Topvolley Precura Antwerpen
3	Daan van Haarlem	15 March 1989	198 cm (6 ft 6 in)	89 kg (196 lb)	332 cm (131 in)	323 cm (127 in)	Prefaxis Menen
4	Thijs ter Horst	18 September 1991	204 cm (6 ft 8 in)	94 kg (207 lb)	364 cm (143 in)	344 cm (135 in)	Copra Elior Piacenza
5	Jelte Maan	19 March 1986	190 cm (6 ft 3 in)	86 kg (190 lb)	343 cm (135 in)	330 cm (130 in)	Noliko Maaseik
6	Jan Willem Snippe	21 May 1986	200 cm (6 ft 7 in)	94 kg (207 lb)	356 cm (140 in)	340 cm (130 in)	Saint-Nazaire
7	Gijs Jorna (L)	30 May 1989	196 cm (6 ft 5 in)	85 kg (187 lb)	340 cm (130 in)	310 cm (120 in)	Topvolley Precura Antwerpen
8	Bas van Bemmelen	18 August 1989	207 cm (6 ft 9 in)	92 kg (203 lb)	350 cm (140 in)	336 cm (132 in)	Topvolley Precura Antwerpen
9	Ewoud Gommans	17 November 1990	202 cm (6 ft 8 in)	89 kg (196 lb)	340 cm (130 in)	320 cm (130 in)	AS Cannes
10	Jeroen Rauwerdink	13 September 1985	200 cm (6 ft 7 in)	92 kg (203 lb)	350 cm (140 in)	320 cm (130 in)	Andreoli Latina
11	Dick Kooy	3 December 1987	202 cm (6 ft 8 in)	80 kg (180 lb)	360 cm (140 in)	340 cm (130 in)	ZAKSA Kedzierzyn-Kozle
12	Kay van Dijk	25 June 1984	214 cm (7 ft 0 in)	102 kg (225 lb)	365 cm (144 in)	355 cm (140 in)	ZAKSA Kedzierzyn-Kozle
13	Maarten van Garderen	24 January 1990	200 cm (6 ft 7 in)	89 kg (196 lb)	359 cm (141 in)	338 cm (133 in)	VfB Friendrichshafen
14	Niels Klapwijk	19 September 1985	200 cm (6 ft 7 in)	89 kg (196 lb)	350 cm (140 in)	320 cm (130 in)	Besiktas
15	Thomas Koelewijn	18 December 1988	206 cm (6 ft 9 in)	100 kg (220 lb)	360 cm (140 in)	350 cm (140 in)	Topvolley Precura Antwerpen
16	Robin Overbeeke	21 March 1989	198 cm (6 ft 6 in)	92 kg (203 lb)	347 cm (137 in)	328 cm (129 in)	Euphony Asse-Lennik
17	Johannes Cornelius Bontje	12 May 1981	206 cm (6 ft 9 in)	98 kg (216 lb)	366 cm (144 in)	340 cm (130 in)	Berlin Recycling Volleys
18	Robbert Andringa	28 April 1990	192 cm (6 ft 4 in)	85 kg (187 lb)	330 cm (130 in)	310 cm (120 in)	Euphony Asse Lennik
19	Dirk Sparidans L)	5 March 1989	181 cm (5 ft 11 in)	86 kg (190 lb)	326 cm (128 in)	300 cm (120 in)	Euphony Asse Lennik
20	Jasper Diefenbach	17 March 1988	195 cm (6 ft 5 in)	90 kg (200 lb)	345 cm (136 in)	330 cm (130 in)	Euphony Asse Lennik
21	Sjoerd Hoogendoorn	17 February 1991	198 cm (6 ft 6 in)	85 kg (187 lb)	354 cm (139 in)	332 cm (131 in)	VaLePa Sastamala
22	Nico Freriks	22 December 1981	193 cm (6 ft 4 in)	87 kg (192 lb)	332 cm (131 in)	314 cm (124 in)	Paykan Tehran
23	Twan Wiltenburg	20 January 1997	204 cm (6 ft 8 in)	86 kg (190 lb)	334 cm (131 in)	325 cm (128 in)	Talentteam Papendal/Arnhem
24	Dennis Borst	1 February 1992	198 cm (6 ft 6 in)	88 kg (194 lb)	351 cm (138 in)	330 cm (130 in)	Landstede Volleybal
25	Mart van Werkhoven	11 December 1991	208 cm (6 ft 10 in)	93 kg (205 lb)	364 cm (143 in)	348 cm (137 in)	LISSP Calais

==== Portugal ====
The following is the Portuguese roster in the 2015 FIVB Volleyball World League.

Head Coach: Hugo Silva

No.	Name	Date of birth	Height	Weight	Spike	Block	2015 club
1	Marcel Keller Gil	8 May 1990	206 cm (6 ft 9 in)	94 kg (207 lb)	352 cm (139 in)	333 cm (131 in)	Beauvais Oise UC
2	José Vieira	6 June 1983	200 cm (6 ft 7 in)	94 kg (207 lb)	332 cm (131 in)	310 cm (120 in)	Chenois Geneve
3	João Fidalgo (L)	2 November 1986	172 cm (5 ft 8 in)	67 kg (148 lb)	307 cm (121 in)	285 cm (112 in)	AJ Fonte Bastardo
4	Filip Cveticanin	19 June 1996	201 cm (6 ft 7 in)	90 kg (200 lb)	320 cm (130 in)	310 cm (120 in)	Castelo da Maia GC
5	Marco Ferreira	4 October 1987	203 cm (6 ft 8 in)	97 kg (214 lb)	359 cm (141 in)	337 cm (133 in)	SC Espinho
6	Alexandre Ferreira	13 November 1991	203 cm (6 ft 8 in)	87 kg (192 lb)	361 cm (142 in)	346 cm (136 in)	Ziraat Bankasi
7	Ivo Casas (L)	21 September 1992	182 cm (6 ft 0 in)	71 kg (157 lb)	290 cm (110 in)	278 cm (109 in)	S.L. Benfica
8	Tiago Violas	27 March 1989	193 cm (6 ft 4 in)	82 kg (181 lb)	326 cm (128 in)	303 cm (119 in)	AJ Fonte Bastardo
9	Nuno Pinheiro	31 December 1984	193 cm (6 ft 4 in)	89 kg (196 lb)	337 cm (133 in)	325 cm (128 in)	Tours VB
10	Gil Pereira	21 February 1995	175 cm (5 ft 9 in)	70 kg (150 lb)	300 cm (120 in)	285 cm (112 in)	Castelo da Maia GC
11	João Oliveira	31 July 1995	194 cm (6 ft 4 in)	80 kg (180 lb)	330 cm (130 in)	318 cm (125 in)	S.L. Benfica
12	João José (c)	7 June 1978	195 cm (6 ft 5 in)	87 kg (192 lb)	352 cm (139 in)	345 cm (136 in)	AJ Fonte Bastardo
13	Valdir Sequeira	22 November 1981	196 cm (6 ft 5 in)	86 kg (190 lb)	351 cm (138 in)	344 cm (135 in)	SC Espinho
14	Fabrício Silva	24 October 1981	196 cm (6 ft 5 in)	96 kg (212 lb)	347 cm (137 in)	320 cm (130 in)	S.L. Benfica
15	Sebastião Alves	22 May 1992	190 cm (6 ft 3 in)	72 kg (159 lb)	342 cm (135 in)	330 cm (130 in)	AA S Mamede
16	Hugo Gaspar	2 September 1982	200 cm (6 ft 7 in)	83 kg (183 lb)	354 cm (139 in)	343 cm (135 in)	S.L. Benfica
17	Miguel Tavares Rodrigues	2 March 1993	191 cm (6 ft 3 in)	68 kg (150 lb)	315 cm (124 in)	293 cm (115 in)	Copra Piacenza
18	André Lopes	12 September 1982	193 cm (6 ft 4 in)	86 kg (190 lb)	342 cm (135 in)	332 cm (131 in)	S.L. Benfica
19	Lourenço Martins	30 April 1997	192 cm (6 ft 4 in)	78 kg (172 lb)	308 cm (121 in)	298 cm (117 in)	Leixoes SC
20	Filipe Sousa	25 January 1995	199 cm (6 ft 6 in)	80 kg (180 lb)	318 cm (125 in)	310 cm (120 in)	AA Espinho
21	Diogo Pereira	21 June 1997	200 cm (6 ft 7 in)	70 kg (150 lb)	310 cm (120 in)	300 cm (120 in)	VC Viana
22	José Monteiro	21 October 1991	180 cm (5 ft 11 in)	70 kg (150 lb)	301 cm (119 in)	290 cm (110 in)	CA Madalena
23	Dinis Alves	15 May 1996	187 cm (6 ft 2 in)	70 kg (150 lb)	320 cm (130 in)	300 cm (120 in)	AA S Mamede
24	Bruno Cunha	18 August 1997	199 cm (6 ft 6 in)	90 kg (200 lb)	320 cm (130 in)	308 cm (121 in)	VC Viana
25	Afonso Guerreiro	28 December 1994	197 cm (6 ft 6 in)	70 kg (150 lb)	319 cm (126 in)	300 cm (120 in)	CV Oeiras

== Group 3 ==
=== Pool F ===
==== Montenegro ====
The following is the Montenegrin roster in the 2015 FIVB Volleyball World League.

No.	Name	Date of birth	Height	Weight	Spike	Block	2015 club
1	Aleksandar Minic	9 November 1986	205 cm (6 ft 9 in)	103 kg (227 lb)	347 cm (137 in)	340 cm (130 in)	
2	Simo Dabovic	9 April 1987	195 cm (6 ft 5 in)	93 kg (205 lb)	335 cm (132 in)	335 cm (132 in)	Foinikas Syros
3	Luka Babic	7 July 1994	211 cm (6 ft 11 in)	105 kg (231 lb)	340 cm (130 in)	330 cm (130 in)	
4	Gojko Cuk	10 October 1988	209 cm (6 ft 10 in)	101 kg (223 lb)	345 cm (136 in)	335 cm (132 in)	Chaumont
5	Rajko Strugar	11 April 1995	193 cm (6 ft 4 in)	85 kg (187 lb)	330 cm (130 in)	320 cm (130 in)	Orange Nassau
6	Vojin Cacic	31 March 1990	202 cm (6 ft 8 in)	90 kg (200 lb)	340 cm (130 in)	330 cm (130 in)	Sahinbey Belediye
7	Ivan Rašovic	29 May 1984	190 cm (6 ft 3 in)	91 kg (201 lb)	315 cm (124 in)	310 cm (120 in)	Budvanska Rivijera
8	Nikola Lakcevic	14 July 1995	190 cm (6 ft 3 in)	89 kg (196 lb)	315 cm (124 in)	305 cm (120 in)	Budvanska Rivijera
9	Marko Bojic	13 November 1988	201 cm (6 ft 7 in)	82 kg (181 lb)	350 cm (140 in)	340 cm (130 in)	Paris Volley
10	Balsa Radunovic	12 August 1992	204 cm (6 ft 8 in)	93 kg (205 lb)	335 cm (132 in)	325 cm (128 in)	Darkulaib
11	Bozidar Cuk	13 June 1992	201 cm (6 ft 7 in)	97 kg (214 lb)	335 cm (132 in)	325 cm (128 in)	Lugano
12	Slobodan Bojic	11 August 1992	200 cm (6 ft 7 in)	95 kg (209 lb)	335 cm (132 in)	325 cm (128 in)	Sfaxien
13	Vuk Medenica	14 February 1989	194 cm (6 ft 4 in)	89 kg (196 lb)	340 cm (130 in)	330 cm (130 in)	Tirana
14	Blazo Milic	22 November 1987	210 cm (6 ft 11 in)	88 kg (194 lb)	340 cm (130 in)	330 cm (130 in)	Nafels
15	Bojan Strugar	30 June 1995	202 cm (6 ft 8 in)	93 kg (205 lb)	330 cm (130 in)	325 cm (128 in)	Buducnost
16	Marko Vukasinovic	30 July 1993	195 cm (6 ft 5 in)	86 kg (190 lb)	330 cm (130 in)	320 cm (130 in)	Nafels
17	Ivan Jecmenica	17 March 1990	202 cm (6 ft 8 in)	90 kg (200 lb)	338 cm (133 in)	330 cm (130 in)	Budvanska Rivijera
18	Miloš Culafic	13 August 1986	206 cm (6 ft 9 in)	101 kg (223 lb)	350 cm (140 in)	340 cm (130 in)	Sahinbey Belediye
19	Milos Simovic	17 December 1985	200 cm (6 ft 7 in)	90 kg (200 lb)	340 cm (130 in)	335 cm (132 in)	CS Banatul
20	Radovan Cebalovic	6 September 1988	202 cm (6 ft 8 in)	110 kg (240 lb)	325 cm (128 in)	320 cm (130 in)	Volley Star
21	Stevan Crnogorac	18 November 1990	201 cm (6 ft 7 in)	96 kg (212 lb)	320 cm (130 in)	315 cm (124 in)	Volley Star
22	Aleksandar Marojevic	18 October 1988	190 cm (6 ft 3 in)	75 kg (165 lb)	315 cm (124 in)	305 cm (120 in)	Volley Star
23	Mladen Novovic	15 August 1985	192 cm (6 ft 4 in)	98 kg (216 lb)	315 cm (124 in)	305 cm (120 in)	Volley Star
24	Bojan Radovic	27 September 1992	203 cm (6 ft 8 in)	100 kg (220 lb)	325 cm (128 in)	320 cm (130 in)	Buducnost
25	Vladan Rudic	31 July 1988	193 cm (6 ft 4 in)	85 kg (187 lb)	315 cm (124 in)	305 cm (120 in)	Jedinstvo

==== Puerto Rico ====
The following is the Puerto Rican roster in the 2015 FIVB Volleyball World League.

No.	Name	Date of birth	Height	Weight	Spike	Block	2015 club
1	Jose Rivera	2 July 1977	192 cm (6 ft 4 in)	85 kg (187 lb)	325 cm (128 in)	320 cm (130 in)	Carolina
2	Edgardo Goas	27 January 1989	197 cm (6 ft 6 in)	95 kg (209 lb)	345 cm (136 in)	330 cm (130 in)	Arecibo
3	Juan Figueroa	6 March 1986	189 cm (6 ft 2 in)	88 kg (194 lb)	335 cm (132 in)	325 cm (128 in)	Arecibo
4	Dennis Del Valle	27 January 1989	175 cm (5 ft 9 in)	58 kg (128 lb)	300 cm (120 in)	290 cm (110 in)	Guaynabo
5	Roberto Muñiz	11 June 1980	196 cm (6 ft 5 in)	92 kg (203 lb)	333 cm (131 in)	326 cm (128 in)	Arecibo
6	Angel Perez	20 May 1982	190 cm (6 ft 3 in)	86 kg (190 lb)	325 cm (128 in)	318 cm (125 in)	Guaynabo
7	Enrique Escalante	6 August 1984	195 cm (6 ft 5 in)	88 kg (194 lb)	330 cm (130 in)	324 cm (128 in)	Guaynabo
8	Steven Morales	7 April 1992	195 cm (6 ft 5 in)	82 kg (181 lb)	346 cm (136 in)	317 cm (125 in)	Corozal
9	Juan Vazquez	23 January 1991	188 cm (6 ft 2 in)	82 kg (181 lb)	298 cm (117 in)	292 cm (115 in)	Mayaguez
10	Ezequiel Cruz	15 July 1986	193 cm (6 ft 4 in)	88 kg (194 lb)	320 cm (130 in)	310 cm (120 in)	Guaynabo
11	Maurice Torres	6 July 1991	201 cm (6 ft 7 in)	100 kg (220 lb)	305 cm (120 in)	299 cm (118 in)	Arecibo
12	Hector Soto	28 June 1978	197 cm (6 ft 6 in)	85 kg (187 lb)	340 cm (130 in)	332 cm (131 in)	Arecibo
13	Jose Miguel Mulero	25 October 1991	170 cm (5 ft 7 in)	63 kg (139 lb)	298 cm (117 in)	284 cm (112 in)	Mayaguez
14	Mannix Roman	17 January 1983	190 cm (6 ft 3 in)	85 kg (187 lb)	295 cm (116 in)	288 cm (113 in)	Mayaguez
15	Fernando Morales	4 February 1982	194 cm (6 ft 4 in)	93 kg (205 lb)	325 cm (128 in)	318 cm (125 in)	Guaynabo
16	Jackson Rivera	19 August 1987	186 cm (6 ft 1 in)	66 kg (146 lb)	360 cm (140 in)	350 cm (140 in)	Mayaguez
17	Pedrito Sierra	21 July 1989	196 cm (6 ft 5 in)	89 kg (196 lb)	305 cm (120 in)	298 cm (117 in)	Fajardo
18	Jessie Colon	20 September 1984	192 cm (6 ft 4 in)	74 kg (163 lb)	247 cm (97 in)	242 cm (95 in)	Lares
19	Jean Carlos Ortiz	23 February 1988	193 cm (6 ft 4 in)	77 kg (170 lb)	288 cm (113 in)	281 cm (111 in)	Guaynabo
20	Sequiel Sánchez	24 March 1990	191 cm (6 ft 3 in)	89 kg (196 lb)	325 cm (128 in)	305 cm (120 in)	Naranjito
21	Pedro Cabrera	15 January 1990	185 cm (6 ft 1 in)	71 kg (157 lb)	239 cm (94 in)	233 cm (92 in)	Arecibo
22	Jon H. Rivera	5 January 1996	193 cm (6 ft 4 in)	77 kg (170 lb)	305 cm (120 in)	299 cm (118 in)	National Team
23	Pablo Guzman	2 June 1987	188 cm (6 ft 2 in)	67 kg (148 lb)	292 cm (115 in)	288 cm (113 in)	Guaynabo
24	Gregory Berrios	24 January 1979	182 cm (6 ft 0 in)	83 kg (183 lb)	305 cm (120 in)	299 cm (118 in)	Arecibo
25	Juan Ruiz	24 April 1981	188 cm (6 ft 2 in)	84 kg (185 lb)	291 cm (115 in)	285 cm (112 in)	San Sebastian

==== Tunisia ====
The following is the Tunisian roster in the 2015 FIVB Volleyball World League.

No.	Name	Date of birth	Height	Weight	Spike	Block	2015 club
1	Tayeb Korbosli	5 June 1993	188 cm (6 ft 2 in)	75 kg (165 lb)	280 cm (110 in)	270 cm (110 in)	C O Kelibia
2	Ahmed Kadhi	19 April 1989	199 cm (6 ft 6 in)	99 kg (218 lb)	345 cm (136 in)	318 cm (125 in)	E.S.Sahel
3	Marouane M'Rabet	5 June 1985	186 cm (6 ft 1 in)	82 kg (181 lb)	315 cm (124 in)	296 cm (117 in)	E.S.Sahel
4	Marouen Garci	21 March 1988	197 cm (6 ft 6 in)	87 kg (192 lb)	317 cm (125 in)	308 cm (121 in)	E.S.Sahel
5	Samir Sellami	13 July 1977	195 cm (6 ft 5 in)	93 kg (205 lb)	320 cm (130 in)	308 cm (121 in)	C.S.Sfaxien
6	Mohamed Ali Ben Othmen Miladi	12 May 1991	188 cm (6 ft 2 in)	73 kg (161 lb)	315 cm (124 in)	289 cm (114 in)	E.S.Tunis
7	Elyes Karamosli	22 August 1989	198 cm (6 ft 6 in)	99 kg (218 lb)	345 cm (136 in)	320 cm (130 in)	E.S.Tunis
8	Mohamed Ben Slimen	29 November 1981	187 cm (6 ft 2 in)	73 kg (161 lb)	325 cm (128 in)	315 cm (124 in)	E.S.Tunis
9	Elyes Garfi	8 June 1993	202 cm (6 ft 8 in)	90 kg (200 lb)	350 cm (140 in)	340 cm (130 in)	E.S.Tunis
10	Hamza Nagga	29 May 1990	191 cm (6 ft 3 in)	84 kg (185 lb)	326 cm (128 in)	311 cm (122 in)	E.S.Sahel
11	Ismail Moalla	30 January 1990	195 cm (6 ft 5 in)	84 kg (185 lb)	324 cm (128 in)	308 cm (121 in)	C.S.Sfaxien
12	Anouer Taouerghi	17 August 1983	178 cm (5 ft 10 in)	74 kg (163 lb)	302 cm (119 in)	292 cm (115 in)	E.S.Sahel
13	Wassim Ben Tara	3 August 1996	199 cm (6 ft 6 in)	87 kg (192 lb)	340 cm (130 in)	320 cm (130 in)	ASUL LYON
14	Bilel Ben Hassine	22 June 1983	195 cm (6 ft 5 in)	88 kg (194 lb)	330 cm (130 in)	315 cm (124 in)	E.S.Tunis
15	Hichem Kaabi	13 September 1986	194 cm (6 ft 4 in)	84 kg (185 lb)	360 cm (140 in)	345 cm (136 in)	E.S.Tunis
16	Khaled Ben Slimene	14 December 1994	193 cm (6 ft 4 in)	78 kg (172 lb)	290 cm (110 in)	285 cm (112 in)	C O Kelibia
17	Malek Chekir	15 January 1993	190 cm (6 ft 3 in)	82 kg (181 lb)	325 cm (128 in)	315 cm (124 in)	E S Tunis
18	Amen Allah Hmissi	6 April 1988	180 cm (5 ft 11 in)	78 kg (172 lb)	310 cm (120 in)	295 cm (116 in)	E.S.Sahel
19	Hatem Obba	21 May 1991	185 cm (6 ft 1 in)	73 kg (161 lb)	315 cm (124 in)	287 cm (113 in)	S.S.B.Saydia
20	Omar Agrebi	26 August 1992	205 cm (6 ft 9 in)	82 kg (181 lb)	325 cm (128 in)	310 cm (120 in)	C.S.Sfaxien
21	Nabil Miladi	28 February 1988	196 cm (6 ft 5 in)	73 kg (161 lb)	355 cm (140 in)	340 cm (130 in)	E.S.Tunis
22	Skander Ben Tara	22 January 1985	205 cm (6 ft 9 in)	102 kg (225 lb)	355 cm (140 in)	345 cm (136 in)	E.S.Tunis
23	Bahri Messaoud	21 June 1991	185 cm (6 ft 1 in)	80 kg (180 lb)	320 cm (130 in)	290 cm (110 in)	C.S.Sfaxien
24	Melek Melliou	30 March 1987	197 cm (6 ft 6 in)	95 kg (209 lb)	345 cm (136 in)	318 cm (125 in)	S.S.B.Saydia
25	Hakim Zouari	28 March 1988	197 cm (6 ft 6 in)	97 kg (214 lb)	330 cm (130 in)	320 cm (130 in)	C.S.Sfaxien

==== Turkey ====
The following is the Turkish roster in the 2015 FIVB Volleyball World League.

No.	Name	Date of birth	Height	Weight	Spike	Block	2015 club
1	Ulas Kiyak	11 August 1981	187 cm (6 ft 2 in)	82 kg (181 lb)	335 cm (132 in)	310 cm (120 in)	HALKBANK
2	Turgay Dogan	14 February 1984	190 cm (6 ft 3 in)	83 kg (183 lb)	335 cm (132 in)	325 cm (128 in)	HALKBANK
3	Hakki Capkinoglu	20 July 1990	200 cm (6 ft 7 in)	75 kg (165 lb)	352 cm (139 in)	337 cm (133 in)	ARKAS
4	Burak Hazirol	10 March 1991	175 cm (5 ft 9 in)	73 kg (161 lb)	310 cm (120 in)	300 cm (120 in)	FENERBAHÇE
5	Baturalp Burak Güngör	28 July 1993	189 cm (6 ft 2 in)	70 kg (150 lb)	345 cm (136 in)	330 cm (130 in)	ZIRAAT BANKASI
6	Kemal Kayhan	2 January 1983	200 cm (6 ft 7 in)	96 kg (212 lb)	345 cm (136 in)	335 cm (132 in)	SAHINBEY BELEDIYESI
7	Mustafa Oguz Ramazanoglu	5 May 1979	189 cm (6 ft 2 in)	79 kg (174 lb)	330 cm (130 in)	310 cm (120 in)	ARKAS
8	Gokhan Gokgoz	6 January 1993	200 cm (6 ft 7 in)	94 kg (207 lb)	345 cm (136 in)	327 cm (129 in)	ARKAS
9	Serhat Coskun	18 July 1986	198 cm (6 ft 6 in)	82 kg (181 lb)	348 cm (137 in)	338 cm (133 in)	ZIRAAT BANKASI
10	Emre Batur	21 April 1988	202 cm (6 ft 8 in)	94 kg (207 lb)	350 cm (140 in)	335 cm (132 in)	HALKBANK
11	Nuri Sahin	1 January 1980	195 cm (6 ft 5 in)	95 kg (209 lb)	313 cm (123 in)	308 cm (121 in)	HALKBANK
12	Yasin Aydın	11 July 1995	190 cm (6 ft 3 in)	72 kg (159 lb)	342 cm (135 in)	324 cm (128 in)	GALATASARAY
13	Emre Senol	1 January 1993	201 cm (6 ft 7 in)	80 kg (180 lb)	330 cm (130 in)	320 cm (130 in)	TOKAT BELEDIYE
14	Faik Samet Güneş	27 May 1993	203 cm (6 ft 8 in)	96 kg (212 lb)	343 cm (135 in)	330 cm (130 in)	HALKBANK
15	Metin Toy	3 May 1994	202 cm (6 ft 8 in)	95 kg (209 lb)	348 cm (137 in)	328 cm (129 in)	FENERBAHÇE
16	Murat Yenipazar	1 January 1993	193 cm (6 ft 4 in)	74 kg (163 lb)	339 cm (133 in)	322 cm (127 in)	IBB
17	Cüneyt Dagci	13 February 1985	209 cm (6 ft 10 in)	107 kg (236 lb)	357 cm (141 in)	341 cm (134 in)	ZIRAAT BANKASI
18	Halil Ibrahim Yücel	24 November 1989	195 cm (6 ft 5 in)	92 kg (203 lb)	345 cm (136 in)	327 cm (129 in)	ARKAS
19	Ozkan Hayirli	27 May 1984	201 cm (6 ft 7 in)	93 kg (205 lb)	329 cm (130 in)	320 cm (130 in)	IBB
20	Kadir Cin	7 May 1987	204 cm (6 ft 8 in)	95 kg (209 lb)	343 cm (135 in)	326 cm (128 in)	IBB
21	Selcuk Keskin	15 January 1982	193 cm (6 ft 4 in)	89 kg (196 lb)	3,325 cm (1,309 in)	320 cm (130 in)	GALATASARAY
22	Hasan Yesilbudak	11 January 1984	192 cm (6 ft 4 in)	82 kg (181 lb)	320 cm (130 in)	310 cm (120 in)	ARKAS
23	Cansin Hacibekiroglu	7 December 1987	202 cm (6 ft 8 in)	93 kg (205 lb)	350 cm (140 in)	340 cm (130 in)	INEGÖL BELEDIYESI
24	Firat Ezel Filiz	29 October 1988	198 cm (6 ft 6 in)	100 kg (220 lb)	345 cm (136 in)	330 cm (130 in)	INEGÖL BELEDIYESI
25	Can Ayvazoglu	14 September 1979	191 cm (6 ft 3 in)	87 kg (192 lb)	350 cm (140 in)	338 cm (133 in)	HALKBANK

=== Pool G ===
==== China ====
The following is the Chinese roster in the 2015 FIVB Volleyball World League.

No.	Name	Date of birth	Height	Weight	Spike	Block	2015 club
1	Zhang Zhejia	31 August 1995	207 cm (6 ft 9 in)	84 kg (185 lb)	357 cm (141 in)	345 cm (136 in)	Shanghai
2	Han Tianyi	26 October 1995	197 cm (6 ft 6 in)	90 kg (200 lb)	350 cm (140 in)	320 cm (130 in)	Shanghai
3	Yuan Zhi	29 September 1981	194 cm (6 ft 4 in)	95 kg (209 lb)	348 cm (137 in)	334 cm (131 in)	Liaoning
4	Zhang Chen	28 June 1985	200 cm (6 ft 7 in)	89 kg (196 lb)	356 cm (140 in)	340 cm (130 in)	Jiangsu
5	Li Yuanbo	27 September 1995	196 cm (6 ft 5 in)	80 kg (180 lb)	345 cm (136 in)	335 cm (132 in)	Henan
6	Li Runming	1 March 1990	198 cm (6 ft 6 in)	93 kg (205 lb)	350 cm (140 in)	326 cm (128 in)	Shandong
7	Zhong Weijun	20 April 1989	200 cm (6 ft 7 in)	88 kg (194 lb)	347 cm (137 in)	335 cm (132 in)	Army
8	Cui Jianjun	1 August 1985	192 cm (6 ft 4 in)	94 kg (207 lb)	350 cm (140 in)	335 cm (132 in)	Henan
9	Jiao Shuai	28 January 1984	194 cm (6 ft 4 in)	75 kg (165 lb)	350 cm (140 in)	341 cm (134 in)	Henan
10	Ji Daoshuai	7 February 1992	195 cm (6 ft 5 in)	85 kg (187 lb)	355 cm (140 in)	335 cm (132 in)	Shandong
11	Geng Xin	15 November 1989	208 cm (6 ft 10 in)	97 kg (214 lb)	348 cm (137 in)	338 cm (133 in)	Shandong
12	Zhan Guojun	16 December 1988	197 cm (6 ft 6 in)	91 kg (201 lb)	235 cm (93 in)	230 cm (91 in)	Shanghai
13	Kou Zhichao	26 June 1989	202 cm (6 ft 8 in)	92 kg (203 lb)	355 cm (140 in)	345 cm (136 in)	Shandong
14	Dai Qingyao	26 September 1991	205 cm (6 ft 9 in)	100 kg (220 lb)	350 cm (140 in)	340 cm (130 in)	Shanghai
15	Rao Shuhan	23 December 1996	209 cm (6 ft 10 in)	85 kg (187 lb)	345 cm (136 in)	340 cm (130 in)	Fujian
16	Tong Jiahua	13 December 1992	180 cm (5 ft 11 in)	76 kg (168 lb)	317 cm (125 in)	305 cm (120 in)	Shanghai
17	Ke Junhuang	28 June 1994	183 cm (6 ft 0 in)	72 kg (159 lb)	330 cm (130 in)	320 cm (130 in)	Fujian
18	Liu Xiangdong	23 February 1993	198 cm (6 ft 6 in)	93 kg (205 lb)	340 cm (130 in)	330 cm (130 in)	Jiangsu
19	Song Jianwei	4 January 1992	194 cm (6 ft 4 in)	75 kg (165 lb)	340 cm (130 in)	330 cm (130 in)	Shandong
20	Xu Jingtao	7 July 1988	202 cm (6 ft 8 in)	76 kg (168 lb)	356 cm (140 in)	320 cm (130 in)	Army
21	Liang Chunlong	25 March 1988	206 cm (6 ft 9 in)	91 kg (201 lb)	351 cm (138 in)	333 cm (131 in)	Liaoning
22	Kong Fanwei	4 December 1989	176 cm (5 ft 9 in)	80 kg (180 lb)	320 cm (130 in)	305 cm (120 in)	Liaoning
23	Chu Hui	11 February 1981	187 cm (6 ft 2 in)	70 kg (150 lb)	355 cm (140 in)	323 cm (127 in)	Beijing
24	Mao Tianyi	2 June 1993	200 cm (6 ft 7 in)	84 kg (185 lb)	350 cm (140 in)	333 cm (131 in)	Army
25	Chen Tao	4 October 1992	188 cm (6 ft 2 in)	79 kg (174 lb)	334 cm (131 in)	335 cm (132 in)	Sichuan

==== Greece ====
The following is the Greek roster in the 2015 FIVB Volleyball World League.

No.	Name	Date of birth	Height	Weight	Spike	Block	2015 club
1	Nikolaos Angelopoulos	6 November 1988	201 cm (6 ft 7 in)	97 kg (214 lb)	337 cm (133 in)	320 cm (130 in)	ANORTHOSI
2	Mitar Tzourits	25 April 1989	211 cm (6 ft 11 in)	115 kg (254 lb)	365 cm (144 in)	340 cm (130 in)	KEPCO 45
3	Apostolos Armenakis	19 July 1980	205 cm (6 ft 9 in)	91 kg (201 lb)	335 cm (132 in)	325 cm (128 in)	AURISPA ALESSANO
4	Georgios Petreas	19 November 1986	201 cm (6 ft 7 in)	92 kg (203 lb)	342 cm (135 in)	320 cm (130 in)	GFC AJACCIO
5	Dmytro Filippov	4 December 1990	198 cm (6 ft 6 in)	84 kg (185 lb)	343 cm (135 in)	320 cm (130 in)	JASTREBSKI
6	Athanasios Maroulis	9 July 1988	191 cm (6 ft 3 in)	83 kg (183 lb)	316 cm (124 in)	290 cm (110 in)	Olympiacos
7	Georgios Stefanou	12 January 1981	187 cm (6 ft 2 in)	82 kg (181 lb)	295 cm (116 in)	305 cm (120 in)	Olympiacos
8	Konstantinos Stivachtis	22 May 1980	186 cm (6 ft 1 in)	80 kg (180 lb)	305 cm (120 in)	295 cm (116 in)	PANATHINAIKOS
9	Menelaos Kokkinakis	21 January 1993	193 cm (6 ft 4 in)	79 kg (174 lb)	325 cm (128 in)	305 cm (120 in)	Olympiacos
10	Athanasios Protopsaltis	12 September 1993	185 cm (6 ft 1 in)	79 kg (174 lb)	325 cm (128 in)	316 cm (124 in)	PANATHINAIKOS
11	Georgios Tzioumakas	23 January 1995	202 cm (6 ft 8 in)	85 kg (187 lb)	332 cm (131 in)	312 cm (123 in)	SIR SAFETY PERUGIA
12	Nikolaos Smaragdis	12 February 1982	202 cm (6 ft 8 in)	89 kg (196 lb)	328 cm (129 in)	318 cm (125 in)	A.O. FOINIKAS SYROU
13	Ioannis Takouridis	24 May 1988	195 cm (6 ft 5 in)	80 kg (180 lb)	300 cm (120 in)	290 cm (110 in)	Olympiacos
14	Panagiotis Pelekoudas	8 November 1989	202 cm (6 ft 8 in)	94 kg (207 lb)	348 cm (137 in)	339 cm (133 in)	POSOJILNICA AICH DOB
15	Rafail Koumentakis	5 May 1993	203 cm (6 ft 8 in)	84 kg (185 lb)	330 cm (130 in)	310 cm (120 in)	CMC RAVENA
16	Andreas-Dimitrios Fragkos	21 December 1989	200 cm (6 ft 7 in)	93 kg (205 lb)	320 cm (130 in)	315 cm (124 in)	MATIN VARAMIN
17	Anestis Dalakouras	18 June 1993	196 cm (6 ft 5 in)	82 kg (181 lb)	307 cm (121 in)	328 cm (129 in)	ETHNIKOS ALEXANDROUPOLIS
18	Dimitrios Gkaras	12 November 1985	181 cm (5 ft 11 in)	74 kg (163 lb)	282 cm (111 in)	280 cm (110 in)	P.A.O.K.
19	Nikolaos Palentzas	6 April 1991	198 cm (6 ft 6 in)	88 kg (194 lb)	315 cm (124 in)	305 cm (120 in)	Iraklis SC
20	Konstantinos Tampouratzis	3 September 1983	193 cm (6 ft 4 in)	93 kg (205 lb)	325 cm (128 in)	305 cm (120 in)	A.O. Kifissias
21	Dimitrios Efraimidis	19 December 1990	190 cm (6 ft 3 in)	74 kg (163 lb)	320 cm (130 in)	310 cm (120 in)	P.A.O.K.
22	Argyrios Mavrovouniotis	22 September 1991	193 cm (6 ft 4 in)	83 kg (183 lb)	321 cm (126 in)	300 cm (120 in)	ARIS THESSALONIKIS
23	Charalampos Sakoglou	1 July 1990	194 cm (6 ft 4 in)	84 kg (185 lb)	320 cm (130 in)	310 cm (120 in)	MENT
24	Gerasimos Kanellos	25 August 1987	198 cm (6 ft 6 in)	88 kg (194 lb)	304 cm (120 in)	304 cm (120 in)	PAMVOHAIKOS
25	Ioannis Pantakidis	5 February 1985	195 cm (6 ft 5 in)	80 kg (180 lb)	325 cm (128 in)	300 cm (120 in)	P.A.O.K.

==== Mexico ====
The following is the Mexican roster in the 2015 FIVB Volleyball World League.

No.	Name	Date of birth	Height	Weight	Spike	Block	2015 club
1	Humberto Ceballos	11 July 1993	197 cm (6 ft 6 in)	87 kg (192 lb)	313 cm (123 in)	286 cm (113 in)	UNAM
2	Daniel Vargas	1 September 1986	197 cm (6 ft 6 in)	94 kg (207 lb)	340 cm (130 in)	330 cm (130 in)	RAISION LOIMU
3	Jesus Ernesto Serrano Aragon	28 December 1994	189 cm (6 ft 2 in)	85 kg (187 lb)	330 cm (130 in)	310 cm (120 in)	JALISCO
4	Irving Gonzalez	22 January 1993	185 cm (6 ft 1 in)	90 kg (200 lb)	310 cm (120 in)	280 cm (110 in)	Colima
5	Jesus Rangel	20 September 1980	190 cm (6 ft 3 in)	82 kg (181 lb)	337 cm (133 in)	330 cm (130 in)	NUEVO LEON
6	Ridl Alexis Garay Nava	9 June 1997	194 cm (6 ft 4 in)	74 kg (163 lb)	326 cm (128 in)	299 cm (118 in)	JALISCO
7	Jorge Quiñones	13 November 1981	186 cm (6 ft 1 in)	80 kg (180 lb)	330 cm (130 in)	325 cm (128 in)	VIRTUS
8	Guerson Acosta	19 July 1992	194 cm (6 ft 4 in)	83 kg (183 lb)	342 cm (135 in)	336 cm (132 in)	NUEVO LEON
9	Carlos Guerra	3 August 1981	196 cm (6 ft 5 in)	95 kg (209 lb)	339 cm (133 in)	330 cm (130 in)	Chenois Geneve Volleyball
10	Pedro Rangel	16 September 1988	192 cm (6 ft 4 in)	85 kg (187 lb)	340 cm (130 in)	324 cm (128 in)	NUEVO LEON
11	Jorge Barajas	7 May 1991	188 cm (6 ft 2 in)	80 kg (180 lb)	320 cm (130 in)	317 cm (125 in)	COLIMA
12	Jose Martinez	23 January 1993	200 cm (6 ft 7 in)	100 kg (220 lb)	345 cm (136 in)	334 cm (131 in)	VIRTUS
13	Miguel Chavez	31 March 1997	202 cm (6 ft 8 in)	73 kg (161 lb)	335 cm (132 in)	293 cm (115 in)	SONORA
14	Tomas Aguilera	15 November 1988	202 cm (6 ft 8 in)	95 kg (209 lb)	350 cm (140 in)	340 cm (130 in)	CHIHUAHUA
15	Alejandro Moreno	6 September 1994	191 cm (6 ft 3 in)	80 kg (180 lb)	338 cm (133 in)	320 cm (130 in)	NUEVO LEON
16	Jesus Alberto Perales	22 December 1993	197 cm (6 ft 6 in)	88 kg (194 lb)	328 cm (129 in)	304 cm (120 in)	NUEVO LEON
17	Nestor Orellana	7 January 1992	192 cm (6 ft 4 in)	84 kg (185 lb)	332 cm (131 in)	327 cm (129 in)	NUEVO LEON
18	Dorian Raya	2 January 1993	200 cm (6 ft 7 in)	95 kg (209 lb)	320 cm (130 in)	303 cm (119 in)	GUANAJUATO
19	Pedro Ruiz	20 June 1995	195 cm (6 ft 5 in)	84 kg (185 lb)	340 cm (130 in)	320 cm (130 in)	VERACRUZ
20	Julian Duarte	19 June 1994	200 cm (6 ft 7 in)	98 kg (216 lb)	321 cm (126 in)	302 cm (119 in)	NUEVO LEON
21	Roberto Rincon	19 April 1993	196 cm (6 ft 5 in)	80 kg (180 lb)	333 cm (131 in)	300 cm (120 in)	IMSS
22	Enrique Ugalde Campo	11 April 1996	190 cm (6 ft 3 in)	76 kg (168 lb)	318 cm (125 in)	295 cm (116 in)	Baja California
23	Ariel Acosta	27 April 1995	194 cm (6 ft 4 in)	78 kg (172 lb)	328 cm (129 in)	305 cm (120 in)	Baja California
24	Adrián Aragón	11 August 1994	193 cm (6 ft 4 in)	77 kg (170 lb)	0 cm (0 in)	0 cm (0 in)	NUEVO LEÓN
25	Gonzalo Ruiz De La Cruz	28 April 1988	186 cm (6 ft 1 in)	87 kg (192 lb)	345 cm (136 in)	325 cm (128 in)	IMSS ATN

==== Slovakia ====
The following is the Slovakian roster in the 2015 FIVB Volleyball World League.

No.	Name	Date of birth	Height	Weight	Spike	Block	2015 club
1	Milan Bencz	5 September 1987	206 cm (6 ft 9 in)	99 kg (218 lb)	363 cm (143 in)	342 cm (135 in)	Revivre Milano
2	Tomas Krisko	19 December 1988	202 cm (6 ft 8 in)	91 kg (201 lb)	350 cm (140 in)	328 cm (129 in)	VK Dukla Liberec
3	Emanuel Kohut	21 July 1982	206 cm (6 ft 9 in)	97 kg (214 lb)	359 cm (141 in)	345 cm (136 in)	Copra Piacenza
4	Martin Sopko	30 January 1982	195 cm (6 ft 5 in)	90 kg (200 lb)	354 cm (139 in)	330 cm (130 in)	Mirad Presov
5	Matej Kubs	26 May 1988	188 cm (6 ft 2 in)	82 kg (181 lb)	341 cm (134 in)	315 cm (124 in)	VK Prievidza
6	Lubos Nemec	2 March 1995	184 cm (6 ft 0 in)	70 kg (150 lb)	315 cm (124 in)	302 cm (119 in)	Spartak VKP Komarno
7	Michal Masny	14 August 1979	182 cm (6 ft 0 in)	75 kg (165 lb)	330 cm (130 in)	310 cm (120 in)	Jastrzebski Wegiel
8	Michal Cerven	16 December 1977	205 cm (6 ft 9 in)	118 kg (260 lb)	345 cm (136 in)	330 cm (130 in)	Mirad Presov
9	Branislav Skladany	16 November 1983	183 cm (6 ft 0 in)	83 kg (183 lb)	332 cm (131 in)	315 cm (124 in)	UGS NANTES REZE
10	Marcel Lux	27 July 1994	200 cm (6 ft 7 in)	92 kg (203 lb)	341 cm (134 in)	315 cm (124 in)	Mirad Presov
11	Martin Vydareny	26 July 1994	186 cm (6 ft 1 in)	85 kg (187 lb)	320 cm (130 in)	305 cm (120 in)	Spartak Myjava
12	Matej Patak	8 June 1990	197 cm (6 ft 6 in)	88 kg (194 lb)	353 cm (139 in)	330 cm (130 in)	Beauvais
13	Stefan Chrtiansky	17 August 1989	207 cm (6 ft 9 in)	95 kg (209 lb)	360 cm (140 in)	335 cm (132 in)	Hypo Tirol Innsbruck
14	Tomas Kmet	1 December 1981	202 cm (6 ft 8 in)	95 kg (209 lb)	350 cm (140 in)	330 cm (130 in)	BERLIN Recycling Volleys
15	Juraj Zatko	5 June 1987	192 cm (6 ft 4 in)	87 kg (192 lb)	347 cm (137 in)	320 cm (130 in)	AZS UWM Olsztyn
16	Peter Michalovic	26 May 1990	200 cm (6 ft 7 in)	90 kg (200 lb)	349 cm (137 in)	335 cm (132 in)	Pallavolo Ortona
17	Frantisek Ogurcak	24 April 1984	198 cm (6 ft 6 in)	95 kg (209 lb)	348 cm (137 in)	321 cm (126 in)	AZS UWM Olsztyn
18	Lubos Kostolani	28 November 1990	203 cm (6 ft 8 in)	95 kg (209 lb)	352 cm (139 in)	335 cm (132 in)	TV Bühl
19	Michal Hruska	13 March 1987	199 cm (6 ft 6 in)	93 kg (205 lb)	340 cm (130 in)	320 cm (130 in)	Posojilnica AICH/DOB
20	Peter Ondrovic	28 March 1995	199 cm (6 ft 6 in)	95 kg (209 lb)	347 cm (137 in)	325 cm (128 in)	COP Trencin
21	Andrej Patuc	30 December 1984	202 cm (6 ft 8 in)	83 kg (183 lb)	348 cm (137 in)	330 cm (130 in)	Spartak VKP Komarno
22	Filip Palgut	23 September 1991	201 cm (6 ft 7 in)	91 kg (201 lb)	348 cm (137 in)	330 cm (130 in)	Posojilnica AICH/DOB
23	Peter Kasper	12 March 1985	201 cm (6 ft 7 in)	105 kg (231 lb)	345 cm (136 in)	330 cm (130 in)	Chemes Spisska Nova Ves
24	Milos Hornik	17 March 1990	205 cm (6 ft 9 in)	88 kg (194 lb)	358 cm (141 in)	340 cm (130 in)	Spartak VKP Komarno
25	Peter Porubsky	29 March 1995	199 cm (6 ft 6 in)	82 kg (181 lb)	345 cm (136 in)	323 cm (127 in)	Spartak Myjava

=== Pool H ===
==== Egypt ====
The following is the Egyptian roster in the 2015 FIVB Volleyball World League.

No.	Name	Date of birth	Height	Weight	Spike	Block	2015 club
1	Saleh Youssef	25 July 1982	194 cm (6 ft 4 in)	91 kg (201 lb)	345 cm (136 in)	332 cm (131 in)	Zamalek
2	Abdallah Abdalsalam Abdallah Bekhit	10 October 1983	202 cm (6 ft 8 in)	85 kg (187 lb)	346 cm (136 in)	330 cm (130 in)	ARMY CLUB
3	Abd Elhalim Mohamed Abou	3 June 1989	210 cm (6 ft 11 in)	88 kg (194 lb)	285 cm (112 in)	270 cm (110 in)	AHLY
4	Ahmed Abdelhay	19 August 1984	197 cm (6 ft 6 in)	87 kg (192 lb)	342 cm (135 in)	316 cm (124 in)	ARMY CLUB
5	Abdellatif Ahmed	13 August 1983	202 cm (6 ft 8 in)	90 kg (200 lb)	345 cm (136 in)	325 cm (128 in)	ZAMALEK
6	Mamdouh Abdelrehim	5 August 1989	207 cm (6 ft 9 in)	90 kg (200 lb)	338 cm (133 in)	325 cm (128 in)	ARMY CLUB
7	Ashraf Abouelhassan	17 May 1975	186 cm (6 ft 1 in)	86 kg (190 lb)	325 cm (128 in)	318 cm (125 in)	ZAMALEK
8	Mohamed Thakil	12 July 1986	184 cm (6 ft 0 in)	71 kg (157 lb)	326 cm (128 in)	315 cm (124 in)	ARMY CLUB
9	Rashad Atia	2 September 1986	201 cm (6 ft 7 in)	91 kg (201 lb)	348 cm (137 in)	342 cm (135 in)	ZAMALEK
10	Mohamed Masoud	1 May 1994	211 cm (6 ft 11 in)	105 kg (231 lb)	358 cm (141 in)	342 cm (135 in)	Smoha
11	Omar Hassan	4 April 1991	191 cm (6 ft 3 in)	104 kg (229 lb)	333 cm (131 in)	324 cm (128 in)	ARMY CLUB
12	Hossam Abdalla	16 February 1988	203 cm (6 ft 8 in)	97 kg (214 lb)	343 cm (135 in)	321 cm (126 in)	AHLY
13	Badawy Mohamed Moneim	11 January 1986	195 cm (6 ft 5 in)	91 kg (201 lb)	326 cm (128 in)	319 cm (126 in)	Zamalek
14	Mahmoud Elnagar	4 January 1993	198 cm (6 ft 6 in)	99 kg (218 lb)	329 cm (130 in)	319 cm (126 in)	Ethad
15	Ahmed Elkotb	23 July 1991	197 cm (6 ft 6 in)	80 kg (180 lb)	328 cm (129 in)	318 cm (125 in)	AHLY
16	Mohamed Seif Elnasr	5 September 1983	202 cm (6 ft 8 in)	89 kg (196 lb)	345 cm (136 in)	339 cm (133 in)	ZAMALEK
17	Reda Haikal	7 November 1990	198 cm (6 ft 6 in)	85 kg (187 lb)	359 cm (141 in)	342 cm (135 in)	ZAMALEK
18	Ibrahim Sayed Abouhamoud	1 January 1985	178 cm (5 ft 10 in)	60 kg (130 lb)	293 cm (115 in)	285 cm (112 in)	Elsharkia
19	Mohamed Moawad	26 August 1987	194 cm (6 ft 4 in)	90 kg (200 lb)	321 cm (126 in)	310 cm (120 in)	AHLY
20	Ahmed Shafik	7 December 1994	190 cm (6 ft 3 in)	97 kg (214 lb)	349 cm (137 in)	323 cm (127 in)	Eastern Company
21	Islam Borg	10 March 1988	0 cm (0 in)	0 kg (0 lb)	0 cm (0 in)	0 cm (0 in)	
22	Marawan Mohamed	29 April 1993	192 cm (6 ft 4 in)	86 kg (190 lb)	331 cm (130 in)	317 cm (125 in)	AHLY
23	Mohamed Hassan	28 September 1993	193 cm (6 ft 4 in)	76 kg (168 lb)	319 cm (126 in)	302 cm (119 in)	ZAMALEK
24	Mahmoud Ganzoury	14 February 1991	0 cm (0 in)	0 kg (0 lb)	0 cm (0 in)	0 cm (0 in)	
25	Ahmed Maghrawy	21 March 1990	0 cm (0 in)	0 kg (0 lb)	0 cm (0 in)	0 cm (0 in)	

==== Kazakhstan ====
The following is the Kazakhstani roster in the 2015 FIVB Volleyball World League.

No.	Name	Date of birth	Height	Weight	Spike	Block	2015 club
1	Roman Fartov	2 December 1992	184 cm (6 ft 0 in)	83 kg (183 lb)	325 cm (128 in)	315 cm (124 in)	Pavlodar VC
2	Anton Kuznetsov	25 September 1989	204 cm (6 ft 8 in)	91 kg (201 lb)	346 cm (136 in)	335 cm (132 in)	KONDENSAT-ZHAIKMUNAY
3	Anton Yudin	13 May 1982	210 cm (6 ft 11 in)	103 kg (227 lb)	350 cm (140 in)	310 cm (120 in)	Pavlodar VC
4	Alexandr Stolnikov	17 July 1988	197 cm (6 ft 6 in)	95 kg (209 lb)	340 cm (130 in)	325 cm (128 in)	TNK Kazchrome
5	Sergey Kuznetsov	26 October 1993	197 cm (6 ft 6 in)	89 kg (196 lb)	321 cm (126 in)	315 cm (124 in)	Almaty VC
6	Kairat Baibekov	28 March 1983	175 cm (5 ft 9 in)	71 kg (157 lb)	320 cm (130 in)	315 cm (124 in)	TNK Kazchrome
7	Asset Bazarkulov	1 March 1987	202 cm (6 ft 8 in)	87 kg (192 lb)	340 cm (130 in)	330 cm (130 in)	Almaty
8	Kanat Gabdulin	4 March 1985	194 cm (6 ft 4 in)	85 kg (187 lb)	330 cm (130 in)	325 cm (128 in)	Almaty VC
9	Marat Imangaliyev	17 March 1980	194 cm (6 ft 4 in)	89 kg (196 lb)	330 cm (130 in)	325 cm (128 in)	Almaty VC
10	Almaz Issin	28 May 1990	194 cm (6 ft 4 in)	77 kg (170 lb)	345 cm (136 in)	335 cm (132 in)	Pavlodar VC
11	Evgeny Dragunov	18 October 1986	190 cm (6 ft 3 in)	95 kg (209 lb)	330 cm (130 in)	320 cm (130 in)	Pavlodar VC
12	Nodirkhan Kadirkhanov	6 September 1991	203 cm (6 ft 8 in)	85 kg (187 lb)	340 cm (130 in)	330 cm (130 in)	Almaty VC
13	Vitaliy Erdshtein	5 May 1992	205 cm (6 ft 9 in)	90 kg (200 lb)	350 cm (140 in)	335 cm (132 in)	Almaty VC
14	Sergey Kostiv	25 January 1987	201 cm (6 ft 7 in)	99 kg (218 lb)	350 cm (140 in)	335 cm (132 in)	Essil VC
15	Vladimir Prokofyev	9 February 1993	203 cm (6 ft 8 in)	94 kg (207 lb)	345 cm (136 in)	330 cm (130 in)	KONDENSAT-ZHAIKMUNAY
16	Oleg Verigin	6 November 1992	190 cm (6 ft 3 in)	82 kg (181 lb)	348 cm (137 in)	337 cm (133 in)	Almaty VC
17	Mikhail Ustinov	22 December 1989	189 cm (6 ft 2 in)	79 kg (174 lb)	330 cm (130 in)	323 cm (127 in)	Kazkhrome
18	Vitaliy Vorivodin	31 July 1990	194 cm (6 ft 4 in)	101 kg (223 lb)	347 cm (137 in)	335 cm (132 in)	Almaty VC
19	Maxim Mamedov	19 July 1987	200 cm (6 ft 7 in)	88 kg (194 lb)	340 cm (130 in)	320 cm (130 in)	TNK Kazchrome
20	Nursultan Bimurza	10 March 1994	195 cm (6 ft 5 in)	75 kg (165 lb)	325 cm (128 in)	320 cm (130 in)	Atyrau VC
21	Nariman Suleimenov	23 June 1982	195 cm (6 ft 5 in)	92 kg (203 lb)	340 cm (130 in)	330 cm (130 in)	Pavlodar VC
22	Vitaliy Mironenko	18 May 1985	187 cm (6 ft 2 in)	90 kg (200 lb)	331 cm (130 in)	329 cm (130 in)	Almaty VC
23	Zhaxsylyk Tleulin	18 June 1985	200 cm (6 ft 7 in)	85 kg (187 lb)	350 cm (140 in)	340 cm (130 in)	Taraz
24	Bigali Zhumagaziyev	1 January 1988	200 cm (6 ft 7 in)	87 kg (192 lb)	335 cm (132 in)	325 cm (128 in)	Atyrau VC
25	Yuriy Stulov	6 April 1980	186 cm (6 ft 1 in)	83 kg (183 lb)	325 cm (128 in)	315 cm (124 in)	Almaty VC

==== Spain ====
The following is the Spanish roster in the 2015 FIVB Volleyball World League.

No.	Name	Date of birth	Height	Weight	Spike	Block	2015 club
1	Guillermo Hernán	25 July 1982	181 cm (5 ft 11 in)	68 kg (150 lb)	335 cm (132 in)	315 cm (124 in)	Paris Volley
2	Ángel Trinidad	27 March 1993	193 cm (6 ft 4 in)	78 kg (172 lb)	338 cm (133 in)	325 cm (128 in)	TV Buhl
3	Sergio Noda Blanco	23 March 1987	191 cm (6 ft 3 in)	87 kg (192 lb)	338 cm (133 in)	325 cm (128 in)	Molfetta
4	Óscar Rodríguez Capel	8 June 1982	170 cm (5 ft 7 in)	70 kg (150 lb)	305 cm (120 in)	290 cm (110 in)	CV CAI Teruel
5	Alejandro Vigil	11 February 1993	204 cm (6 ft 8 in)	89 kg (196 lb)	348 cm (137 in)	330 cm (130 in)	Vero Volley Monza
6	José Miguel Sugrañes Martínez	25 August 1985	201 cm (6 ft 7 in)	95 kg (209 lb)	340 cm (130 in)	325 cm (128 in)	Lennik
7	Gustavo Delgado Escribano	21 January 1986	192 cm (6 ft 4 in)	89 kg (196 lb)	340 cm (130 in)	315 cm (124 in)	CV CAI Teruel
8	Marc Altayó Ruiz	17 May 1986	202 cm (6 ft 8 in)	87 kg (192 lb)	336 cm (132 in)	320 cm (130 in)	CV CAI Teruel
9	Daniel Rocamora Blazquez	27 May 1988	203 cm (6 ft 8 in)	104 kg (229 lb)	348 cm (137 in)	332 cm (131 in)	SK Posojilnica Aich/Dob
10	Jorge Fernández Valcarcel	4 May 1989	201 cm (6 ft 7 in)	90 kg (200 lb)	345 cm (136 in)	325 cm (128 in)	Paris Volley
11	Víctor Manuel Viciana Mera	2 October 1983	187 cm (6 ft 2 in)	83 kg (183 lb)	330 cm (130 in)	315 cm (124 in)	CV CAI Teruel
12	Gerard Osorio	29 March 1993	200 cm (6 ft 7 in)	89 kg (196 lb)	346 cm (136 in)	331 cm (130 in)	Lyon
13	Antoni Llabres	20 November 1991	189 cm (6 ft 2 in)	77 kg (170 lb)	330 cm (130 in)	320 cm (130 in)	CV Unicaja Almería
14	Miguel Angel Fornes	6 September 1993	202 cm (6 ft 8 in)	94 kg (207 lb)	354 cm (139 in)	339 cm (133 in)	CV Unicaja Almería
15	Andrés J. Villena	27 February 1993	194 cm (6 ft 4 in)	88 kg (194 lb)	356 cm (140 in)	330 cm (130 in)	Domar Matera
16	Juan Carlos Barcala	25 January 1984	201 cm (6 ft 7 in)	94 kg (207 lb)	348 cm (137 in)	325 cm (128 in)	CV CAI Teruel
17	Francisco J. Ruiz	7 June 1991	178 cm (5 ft 10 in)	70 kg (150 lb)	334 cm (131 in)	310 cm (120 in)	CV CAI Teruel
18	Francesc Llenas	13 September 1982	186 cm (6 ft 1 in)	72 kg (159 lb)	325 cm (128 in)	300 cm (120 in)	Narbonne
19	Pablo Bugallo	20 November 1991	196 cm (6 ft 5 in)	93 kg (205 lb)	344 cm (135 in)	330 cm (130 in)	Unicaja Almería
20	Carlos Jiménez	12 August 1995	192 cm (6 ft 4 in)	65 kg (143 lb)	320 cm (130 in)	309 cm (122 in)	CPJM CETD Palencia
21	Mario Ferrera	18 January 1987	187 cm (6 ft 2 in)	85 kg (187 lb)	330 cm (130 in)	310 cm (120 in)	Kifissia Atenas
22	Aharon Gamiz	13 May 1989	180 cm (5 ft 11 in)	70 kg (150 lb)	310 cm (120 in)	295 cm (116 in)	CV FC Barcelona
23	Carlos Mora Sabaté	19 March 1990	197 cm (6 ft 6 in)	88 kg (194 lb)	340 cm (130 in)	320 cm (130 in)	SVG Lüneburg
24	Ignacio Sánchez	24 February 1991	191 cm (6 ft 3 in)	76 kg (168 lb)	332 cm (131 in)	321 cm (126 in)	CV Unicaja Almería
25	Jorge Almansa	17 April 1991	195 cm (6 ft 5 in)	81 kg (179 lb)	338 cm (133 in)	325 cm (128 in)	CV Unicaja Almería

==== Venezuela ====
The following is the Venezuelan roster in the 2015 FIVB Volleyball World League.

No.	Name	Date of birth	Height	Weight	Spike	Block	2015 club
1	Paul Viloria	30 June 1995	201 cm (6 ft 7 in)	92 kg (203 lb)	343 cm (135 in)	338 cm (133 in)	Distrito Capital
3	Fernando González	30 June 1989	194 cm (6 ft 4 in)	84 kg (185 lb)	333 cm (131 in)	328 cm (129 in)	Chubut Voley
4	Héctor Mata	27 January 1991	179 cm (5 ft 10 in)	77 kg (170 lb)	310 cm (120 in)	304 cm (120 in)	ANZOATEGUI
5	Emerson Rodríguez	2 February 1993	202 cm (6 ft 8 in)	90 kg (200 lb)	338 cm (133 in)	333 cm (131 in)	Distrito Capital
8	Héctor Salerno	18 June 1991	196 cm (6 ft 5 in)	76 kg (168 lb)	358 cm (141 in)	351 cm (138 in)	ARAGUA
9	José Carrasco	20 May 1989	195 cm (6 ft 5 in)	89 kg (196 lb)	345 cm (136 in)	347 cm (137 in)	Yaracuy
10	Kervin Piñerua	22 February 1991	191 cm (6 ft 3 in)	85 kg (187 lb)	377 cm (148 in)	345 cm (136 in)	MIRANDA
11	Jhoser Rafael Contreras Rangel	3 April 1991	191 cm (6 ft 3 in)	84 kg (185 lb)	340 cm (130 in)	334 cm (131 in)	ZULIA
13	Iván Márquez	4 October 1981	205 cm (6 ft 9 in)	90 kg (200 lb)	372 cm (146 in)	367 cm (144 in)	Pallavolo Pineto
14	Máximo Montoya	26 June 1989	198 cm (6 ft 6 in)	86 kg (190 lb)	347 cm (137 in)	343 cm (135 in)	Apure
17	Daniel Escobar	10 July 1990	202 cm (6 ft 8 in)	90 kg (200 lb)	350 cm (140 in)	345 cm (136 in)	Miranda
18	Jonathan Quijada	25 September 1995	203 cm (6 ft 8 in)	82 kg (181 lb)	346 cm (136 in)	341 cm (134 in)	Aragua
19	Willner Rivas	2 April 1995	194 cm (6 ft 4 in)	81 kg (179 lb)	339 cm (133 in)	336 cm (132 in)	Distrito Capital
20	Oscar García	16 September 1995	168 cm (5 ft 6 in)	76 kg (168 lb)	320 cm (130 in)	315 cm (124 in)	Barinas
