= Javiel Montes De Oca =

Cuban volleyball player (born 1997)

Javiel Montes De Oca Genova

Personal information
- Nationality: Cuban
- Born: 12 September 1997 (age 29)
- Height: 200 cm (6 ft 7 in)
- Weight: 89 kg (196 lb)
- Spike: 346 cm (136 in)
- Block: 340 cm (134 in)

Career
Years	Teams
2015	Mayabeque

National team
2015	Cuba

Javiel Montes De Oca Genova (born 12 September 1997) is a Cuban male volleyball player. He is part of the Cuba men's national volleyball team. On club level he plays for MAYABEQUE.
