= Martin Paliyski =

Bulgarian volleyball player (born 1989)

Personal information
- Nationality: Bulgarian
- Born: 2 October 1989 (age 37)
- Height: 200 cm (6 ft 7 in)
- Weight: 95 kg (209 lb)
- Spike: 338 cm (133 in)
- Block: 330 cm (130 in)

Volleyball information
- Number: 24 (national team)

Career
Years	Teams
2015	Pirin Razlog

National team
2015	Bulgaria

Martin Paliyski (Bulgarian: Мартин Палийски (born 2 October 1989) is a Bulgarian male volleyball player. He is part of the Bulgaria men's national volleyball team. On club level he plays for Pirin Razlog.
