= 2014 FIVB Volleyball World League squads =

This is a list of all participating team squads at the 2014 FIVB Volleyball World League, played by twenty-eight countries.

== Argentina ==
Coach: (Argentina) Julio Velasco
assistant: Julián Alvares

Number	Name	Date of Birth	Height (cm)	2014 Club	Position
1	Agustin Ramonda	02.06.1991	200	(Argentina) La Union de Formosa	OH
2	Javier Filardi (C)	07.02.1980	190	(Argentina) UPCN San Juan Volley	OH
3	Gustavo Federico Porporatto	07.05.1981	199	(Argentina) La Union de Formosa	MB
4	Sebastian Garrocq	27.11.1979	170	(Argentina) UPCN San Juan Volley	L
5	Nicolás Uriarte	21.03.1990	192	(Poland) Skra Bełchatów	S
6	Pablo Bengolea	08.05.1986	197	(Argentina) UPCN San Juan Volley	OH
7	Facundo Conte	25.08.1989	198	(Argentina) UPCN San Juan Volley	OH
8	Demián González	21.02.1983	192	(Argentina) UPCN San Juan Volley	S
9	Rodrigo Quiroga	23.03.1987	190	(Brazil) Volei Brasil Centro de Excelencia	OH
10	Jose Luiz González	27.12.1984	206	(Poland) BBTS Siatkarz	O
11	Sebastian Solé	12.06.1991	202	(Italy) Trentino Volley	MB
12	Federico Pereyra	19.06.1988	200	(Belgium) Noliko Maaseik	O
13	Facundo Imhoff	25.01.1989	202	(Argentina) Lomas Volley	MB
14	Pablo Crer	12.06.1989	205	(Italy) Callipo Sport	MB
15	Luciano De Cecco	02.06.1988	194	(Italy) Copra Elior Piacenza	S
16	Martin Ramos	26.08.1991	197	(Argentina) UPCN San Juan Volley	MB
17	Franco Massimino	23.05.1988	177	(Argentina) Lomas Volley	L
18	Lucas Ocampo	20.03.1986	196	(Argentina) Lomas Volley	O
19	Maximiliano Gauna	29.04.1989	197	(Argentina) Sarmiento Santana Textiles	MB
20	Alejandro Toro	20.07.1989	190	(Argentina) Lomas Volley	OH
21	Sebastián Closter	13.05.1989	180	(Argentina) Drean Bolivar	L
22	Luciano Zornetta	06.03.1993	182	(Argentina) Club Boca Juniors	O/OH

== Australia ==
Coach: (Argentina) Jon Uriarte
assistant: Daniel Ilott

Number	Name	Date of Birth	Height (cm)	2014 Club	Position
1	Aidan Zingel (C)	19.11.1990	207	(Italy) BluVolley Verona	MB
2	Jacob Ross Guymer	21.06.1993	203	(Sweden) Örkelljunga VK	MB
3	Nathan Roberts	17.02.1986	199	(Switzerland) Pallavolo Lugano	OH
4	Paul Sanderson	07.01.1986	195	(Finland) Saimaa Volley
5	Travis Passier	26.04.1989	206	(Australia) Australian Institute of Sport	MB
6	Thomas Edgar	21.06.1989	212	(South Korea) Gumi LIG Insurance Greaters	O
7	Harrison Peacock	31.01.1991	192	(Australia) Australian Institute of Sport	S
8	Lewis Mcdonald	20.01.1995	180	(Australia) Australian Institute of Sport	L
9	Adam White	08.11.1989	203	(Italy) BluVolley Verona	O
10	Benjamin Bell	24.02.1990	200	(Poland) Ślepsk Suwałki	S
11	Luke Perry	20.11.1995	180	(Australia) Australian Institute of Sport	L
12	Nehemiah Mote	21.06.1993	204	(Australia) Australian Institute of Sport	MB
13	Samuel Walker	19.02.1995	208	(Sweden) Linkoping Volleyball Club	OH
14	Greg Sukochev	18.02.1988	196	(Latvia) RTU/Robežsardze	S
15	Thomas Ewen Douglas-Powell	16.09.1992	194	(Canada) University of Winnipeg	OH
16	Luke Smith	30.08.1990	204	(Czech Republic) VO Przybram	O
17	Paul Carroll	16.05.1986	207	(Germany) SCC Berlin	O
18	Lincoln Alexander Williams	06.10.1993	200	(Italy) Volley Corigliano	O
19	Jordan Richards	25.09.1993	193	(Netherlands) Landstede Volleybal	OH
20	Alexander Mcmullin	01.08.1995	201	(Australia) Australian Institute of Sport	OH
21	Arshdeep Dosanjh	30.07.1996	205	(Australia) Australian Institute of Sport	S
22	Trent O'Dea	11.05.1994	201	(Australia) Australian Institute of Sport

== Belgium ==
Coach: (Belgium) Dominique Baeyens
assistant: Kris Tanghe

Number	Name	Date of Birth	Height (cm)	2014 Club	Position
1	Bram van den Dries	14.08.1989	206	(France) Beauvais Oise UC	O
2	Hendrik Tuerlinckx	01.12.1987	195	(Belgium) Knack Randstad Roeselare	O
3	Sam Deroo	29.04.1992	202	(Italy) Casa Modena	OH
4	Pieter Coolman	24.04.1989	200	(Belgium) Knack Randstad Roeselare	MB
5	Frank Depestele (C)	03.09.1977	191	(France) Beauvais Oise UC	S
6	Stijn Dejonckheere	21.01.1988	184	(Belgium) Knack Randstad Roeselare	L
7	Florian Malisse	14.12.1997	191	(Belgium) TopSport School Vilvoorde	O
8	Kevin Klinkenberg	04.10.1990	197	(France) Tours VB	OH
9	Pieter Verhees	08.12.1989	205	(Italy) Andreoli Latina	MB
10	Simon Van De Voorde	19.12.1989	208	(Poland) Jastrzębski Węgiel	MB
11	Matthijs Verhanneman	08.12.1988	198	(Belgium) Knack Randstad Roeselare	OH
12	Gert van Walle	07.08.1987	197	(Italy) Altotevere Città di Castello	O
13	Lowie Stuer	24.11.1995	193	(Belgium) Knack Randstad Roeselare	L
14	Bert Derkoningen	10.07.1982	189	(Belgium) Noliko Maaseik	L
15	Sander Depovere	08.01.1995	196	(Belgium) Top Volley Precura Antwerpen	S
16	Matthias Valkiers	08.04.1990	198	(Belgium) Noliko Maaseik	S
17	Arno Van De Velde	30.12.1995	210	(Belgium) Knack Randstad Roeselare	MB
18	Seppe Baetens	13.02.1989	191	(Belgium) Top Volley Precura Antwerpen	OH
19	Martijn Colson	08.04.1994	203	(Belgium) Top Volley Precura Antwerpen	MB
20	Jolan Cox	12.07.1991	194	(Belgium) Prefaxis Menen	O
21	Francois Lecat	19.04.1993	200	(Belgium) Noliko Maaseik	OH
22	Yves Kruyner	10.05.1990	194	(Belgium) VC Argex Duvel Puurs	S

== Brazil ==
Coach: (Brazil) Bernardo Rezende
assistant: Roberley Leonaldo

Number	Name	Date of Birth	Height (cm)	2014 Club	Position
1	Bruno Rezende (C)	02.07.1986	190	(Italy) Casa Modena	S
2	Isac Santos	13.12.1990	205	(Brazil) Sada Cruzeiro Vôlei	MB
3	Éder Carbonera	19.10.1983	204	(Brazil) Sada Cruzeiro Vôlei	MB
4	Wallace de Souza	26.06.1987	198	(Brazil) Sada Cruzeiro Vôlei	O
5	Sidnei dos Santos	09.07.1982	203	(Brazil) SESI	MB
6	Leandro Vissotto	30.04.1983	212	(Brazil) RJX Rio de Janeiro	O
7	William Arjona	31.07.1979	185	(Brazil) Sada Cruzeiro Vôlei	S
8	Murilo Endres	03.05.1981	190	(Brazil) SESI	OH
9	Théo Lopes	31.08.1983	199	(Argentina) UPCN San Juan Volley	O
10	Ricardo Lucarelli	14.02.1992	195	(Brazil) SESI	OH
11	Felipe Lourenço Silva	25.08.1990	188	(Brazil) BMG São Bernardo	L
12	Luiz Felipe Fonteles	19.06.1984	196	(Turkey) Fenerbahçe Stambuł	OH
13	Maurício Souza	29.09.1988	209	(Turkey) Halkbank Ankara	MB
14	Rafael Araujo	13.06.1991	206	(Brazil) Taubate
15	Gustavo Bonatto	02.01.1986	214	(Brazil) Meddley Campinas	MB
16	Lucas Saatkamp	06.03.1986	209	(Brazil) SESI	MB
17	Murilo Radke	31.01.1989	194	(Brazil) Canoas	OH
18	Maurício Borges Silva	04.02.1989	197	(Brazil) Minas Tênis Clube	OH
19	Mário Pedreira Júnior	03.05.1982	192	(Brazil) RJ	L
20	Raphael Vieira de Oliveira	14.06.1979	190	(Qatar) Al Rayyan	S
21	Douglas Souza	20.08.1995	198	(Brazil) São Bernardo	OH
22	Lucas Lóh	18.01.1991	195	(Brazil) Minas Tênis Clube

== Bulgaria ==
Coach: (Italy) Camillo Placi
assistant: Dario Simoni

Number	Name	Date of Birth	Height (cm)	2014 Club	Position
1	Georgi Bratoev	21.10.1987	203	(Ukraine) Łokomotyw Charków	S
2	Ventsislav Trifonov	19.01.1992	205	(Bulgaria) Marek Junion-Iwkoni Dupnica	MB
3	Zlatan Yordanov	02.03.1991	200	(France) Saint-Nazaire flagiconA	O/P
4	Martin Bozhilov	11.04.1988	190	(Bulgaria) Marek Junion-Iwkoni Dupnica	L
5	Ivan Latunov	29.06.1990	201	(Bulgaria) Lewski Siconco Sofia	MB
6	Danail Milushev	03.02.1984	200	(France) Spacer's de Toulouse	O
7	Branimir Grozdanov	21.05.1994	198	(Bulgaria) CSKA Sofia	O/P
8	Todor Skrimov	09.01.1990	191	(Italy) Andreoli Latina	OH
9	Dobromir Dimitrov	07.07.1991	198	(Bulgaria) KVK Gabrowo	S
10	Valentin Bratoev	21.10.1987	203	(Germany) VfB Friedrichshafen	OH
11	Georgi Seganov	10.06.1993	198	(Bulgaria) CSKA Sofia	O
12	Viktor Yosifov	16.10.1985	204	(Germany) VfB Friedrichshafen	MB
13	Teodor Salparov	16.08.1982	187	(France) ASUL Lyon Volley	L
14	Ventsislav Ragin	08.04.1992	201	(Bulgaria) VC Montana
15	Todor Aleksiev (C)	21.04.1983	204	(Russia) Gazprom-Jugra Surgut	OH
16	Simeon Aleksandrov	18.02.1988	194	(Bulgaria) Lewski Siconco Sofia	O/P
17	Nikolay Penchev	22.05.1992	197	(Poland) Resovia Rzeszów	OH
18	Nikolay Nikolov	29.07.1986	206	(Iran) Matin Varna	MB
19	Tsvetan Sokolov	31.12.1989	206	(Italy) Trentino Volley	O
20	Venelin Kadankov	31.08.1987	205	(Bulgaria) Marek Junion-Iwkoni Dupnica	OH
21	Krasimir Georgiev	13.02.1995	203	(Bulgaria) CSKA Sofia	MB
22	Chono Penchev	11.12.1994	197	(Bulgaria) Pirin	S

== Canada ==
Coach: (Canada) Glenn Hoag
assistant: Vincent Pichette

Number	Name	Date of Birth	Height (cm)	2014 Club	Position
1	TJ Sanders	14.12.1991	191	(Netherlands) Abiant Lycurgus	S
2	John Gordon Perrin	17.08.1989	201	(Turkey) Arkas Spor Izmir	OH
3	Daniel Lewis	03.04.1976	189	(Poland) ZAKSA Kędzierzyn-Koźle	L
4	Jason Derocco	19.09.1989	198	(France) UGS Nantes Rezé Métropole	O
5	Rudy Verhoeff	24.06.1989	198	(France) Chaumont flagicon 52 Haute-Marne	O
6	Justin Duff	10.05.1988	202	(Indonesia) Dżakarta Energi	MB
7	Dallas Soonias	25.04.1984	200	(China) Fujian VC	O
8	Adam Simac	09.08.1983	203	(Switzerland) PV Lugano	MB
9	Dustin Schneider	27.02.1985	182	(Poland) ZAKSA Kędzierzyn-Koźle	S
10	Toontje Van Lankvelt	01.07.1984	197	(France) ASUL Lyon Volley	OH
11	Steve Brinkman	12.01.1978	203	(Greece) Panachaiki Gymnastiki Enosi	MB
12	Gavin Schmitt	27.01.1986	208	(Turkey) Arkas Spor Izmir	O
13	Christopher Hoag	03.09.1988	192	(France) Tourcoing LM	OH
14	Adam Kamiński	27.05.1984	205	(Poland) Czarni Radom	MB
15	Frederic Winters (C)	25.09.1982	195	(China) Beijing BAIC Motors	OH
16	Stephen Gotch	18.10.1985	194	(Greece) Panachaiki Gymnastiki Enosi	OH
17	Graham Vigrass	17.06.1989	205	(France) Arago de Sète	MB
18	Nicholas Hoag	19.08.1992	200	(France) Tours VB	OH
19	Blair Cameron Bann	26.02.1988	184	(France) UGS Nantes Rezé Métropole	L
20	Ciaran Mcgovern	05.06.1989	181	(Germany) evivo Düren
21	Jay Blankenau	27.09.1989	194	(Greece) MAS NIKI Aiginiou	S
22	Steven Marshall	23.11.1989	189	Team Canada

== China ==
Coach: (China) Zhou Jian’an
assistant: Liqun Yang

Number	Name	Date of Birth	Height (cm)	2014 Club	Position
1	Bian Hongmin	22.09.1989	201	(China) Zhejiang	MB
2	Zhao Yichen	27.12.1990	195	(China) Army
3	Yuan Zhi	29.09.1981	195	(China) Liaoning	OH
4	Zhang Chen	28.06.1985	201	(China) Jiangsu	MB
5	Dai Qingyao	26.09.1991	205	(China) Shanghai	O
6	Liang Chunlong	25.03.1988	206	(China) Liaoning	MB
7	Zhong Weijun (C)	20.04.1989	199	(China) Army	OH
8	Cui Jianjun	01.08.1985	190	(China) Henan	OH
9	Jiao Shuai	28.01.1984	194	(China) Henan	S
10	Wang Chen	16.11.1987	193	(China) Beijing
11	Geng Xin	15.11.1989	208	(China) Shandong
12	Shan Qingtao	16.01.1986	194	(China) Beijing
13	Kou Zhichao	26.06.1989	202	(China) Shandong
14	Xu Jingtao	07.07.1988	202	(China) Army	MB
15	Li Runming	01.03.1990	198	(China) Shandong	S
16	Ren Qi	24.02.1984	174	(China) Shanghai	L
17	Chu Hui	11.02.1981	187	(China) Beijing	L
18	Ji Daoshuai	07.02.1992	195	(China) Shandong
19	Fang Yingchao	03.08.1982	198	(China) Shanghai	OH
20	Zhan Guojun	16.12.1988	197	(China) Shanghai
21	Song Jianwei	04.01.1992	192	(China) Shandong
22	Mao Tianyi	02.06.1993	200	(China) Guangdong

== Cuba ==
Coach: (Cuba) Rodolfo Luis Sanchez Sanchez
assistant: Victor Andres Garcia Campos

Number	Name	Date of Birth	Height (cm)	2014 Club	Position
1	Yosvani Gonzalez Nicolas	18.04.1988	196	(Cuba) La Habana	L
2	Inovel Romero Valdes	28.01.1995	197	(Cuba) Ciego De Avila	OH
3	Ricardo Norberto Calvo Manzano	02.10.1996	193	(Cuba) Villa Clara	S
4	Javier Ernesto Jimenez Scull	16.11.1989	198	(Cuba) Matanzas
5	Leandro Macias Infante	13.02.1990	192	Santiago de Cuba	S
6	Keibel Gutiérrez	06.05.1987	178	(Cuba) Villa Clara	L
7	Yonder Roman Garcia Alvarez	26.02.1993	183	(Cuba) Ciudad Habana	L
8	Rolando Cepeda Abreu (C)	13.03.1989	198	(Cuba) Sancti Spiritus	O
9	Livan Osoria Rodriguez	05.02.1994	201	Santiago de Cuba
10	Danger Jorber Quintana Guerra	19.05.1994	200	(Cuba) La Habana	MB
11	Lazaro Raydel Fundora Travieso	13.02.1994	195	(Cuba) La Habana
12	Abrahan Alfonso Gavilan	23.02.1995	197	(Cuba) La Habana	U
13	David Fiel Rodriguez	28.08.1993	204	(Cuba) Ciudad Habana	MB
14	Osniel Cecilio Rendon Gonzalez	26.06.1996	202	(Cuba) Matanzas	O
15	Dariel Albo Miranda	11.02.1992	201	(Cuba) Ciudad Habana	MB
16	Isbel Mesa Sandoval	02.06.1989	204	(Cuba) La Habana	MB
17	Felix Emilio Chapman Piñeiro	05.10.1996	198	(Cuba) Mayabeque	MB
18	Denny De Jesus Hernandez Martinez	24.02.1994	190	(Cuba) Pinar Del Rio
19	Mario Luis Rivera Sanchez	26.10.1982	180	(Cuba) Pinar Del Rio
20	Osmany Santiago Uriarte Mestre	04.06.1995	197	(Cuba) Sancti Spiritus
21	Luis Guillermo Jimeno Hernandez	04.11.1995	197	(Cuba) Matanzas	O
22	Jorge Felix Caraballo Castillo	15.10.1996	202	(Cuba) Villa Clara	MB

== Czech Republic ==
Coach: (Czech Republic) Zdeněk Šmejkal
assistant: Jindřich Licek

Number	Name	Date of Birth	Height (cm)	2014 Club	Position
1	Jakub Veselý	02.09.1986	207	(Poland) AZS Częstochowa	MB
2	Zdeněk Haník	11.07.1986	178	(Czech Republic) VK Ostrava	S
3	Radek Mach	28.09.1984	206	(Czech Republic) VK Czeskie Budziejowice	MB
4	Tomas Hyský	02.11.1983	203	(Czech Republic) VK Dukla Liberec	OH
5	Jiří Kral	08.07.1981	202	(France) Beauvais Oise Université Club	MB
6	Karel Linz	20.04.1986	200	(Russia) Dorozhnik Krasnoyarsk	O
7	Aleš Holubec	13.03.1984	199	(France) UGS Nantes Rezé Métropole	MB
8	Filip Habr (C)	27.04.1988	201	(Czech Republic) VK Czeskie Budziejowice	S
9	Pavel Bartoš	20.04.1994	191	(Czech Republic) VSC Zlín	S
10	Michal Finger	02.09.1993	202	(Czech Republic) VolleyTeam ČZU Praga	O
11	Martin Kryštof	11.10.1982	179	(Germany) SCC Berlin	L
12	David Juračka	27.05.1989	182	(Czech Republic) VO Przybram	L
13	Kamil Baránek	02.05.1983	198	(France) Tours VB	OH
14	Adam Bartoš	27.04.1992	198	(Czech Republic) VSC Zlín	O
15	Jan Štokr	16.01.1983	205	(Russia) VC Kuban Krasnodar	O
16	Tomáš Široký	26.10.1982	196	(Czech Republic) VK Ostrava	MB
17	Jan Kuliha	24.05.1990	198	(Czech Republic) VK Czeskie Budziejowice	L/P
18	Michal Kriško	23.11.1988	200	(Czech Republic) VK Czeskie Budziejowice	OH/A
19	Petr Michálek	19.08.1989	190	(Czech Republic) VK Czeskie Budziejowice	OH
20	Vladimír Sobotka	07.05.1985	203	(Czech Republic) VK Czeskie Budziejowice	MB
21	Marek Beer	24.05.1988	201	(Czech Republic) VK Dukla Liberec	MB
22	Václav Kopáček	21.10.1982	182	(Czech Republic) VK Dukla Liberec	L

== Finland ==
Coach: (Finland) Tuomas Sammelvuo
assistant: Nicola Giolito

Number	Name	Date of Birth	Height (cm)	2014 Club	Position
1	Ville Juntura	26.03.1988	192	(Finland) Raision Loimu	S
2	Eemi Tervaportti	26.07.1989	193	(Belgium) Knack Randstad Roeselare	S
3	Mikko Esko	03.09.1978	198	(Bulgaria) Gubiernija Niżny Nowogród	S
4	Lauri Kerminen	18.01.1993	182	(France) UGS Nantes Rezé Métropole	L
5	Antti Siltala	14.03.1984	193	(France) GFCO Ajaccio Volley-Ball	OH
6	Niklas Seppänen	30.06.1993	192	(Finland) Kokkolan Tiikerit	OH
7	Eemeli Kouki	26.10.1991	194	(Finland) Hurrikaani-Loimaa	OH
8	Elviss Krastins	15.09.1994	192	(Finland) Vammalan Lentopallo	OH
9	Tommi Siirilä	05.08.1993	203	(Finland) Kokkolan Tiikerit	MB
10	Urpo Sivula	15.03.1988	195	(Turkey) Arkas Spor Izmir	OH
11	Timo Tolvanen	08.11.1977	183	(Finland) LEKA Volley	L
12	Olli Kunnari	02.02.1982	197	(Finland) Vammalan Lentopallo	OH
13	Mikko Oivanen	26.05.1986	198	(Poland) Czarni Radom	O
14	Konstantin Shumov	15.02.1985	205	(Germany) Generali Haching	MB
15	Matti Oivanen	26.05.1986	198	(Poland) AZS Olsztyn	MB
16	Olli-Pekka Ojansivu	31.12.1987	197	(Finland) Kokkolan Tiikerit	O
17	Ville Sorvoja	02.12.1990	194	(Finland) Lentopalloseura Etta	O
18	Jukka Lehtonen (C)	22.02.1982	197	(Switzerland) PV Lugano	MB
19	Jani Sippola	04.05.1990	191	(Finland) Raision Loimu	S
20	Samuli Kaislasalo	03.08.1995	204	(Finland) Hurrikaani-Loimaa	MB
21	Aleksi Mutka	23.03.1995	182	(Finland) Rantaperkiön Isku	L
22	Joni Savimäki	28.01.1991	191	(Finland) Liiga-Riento	OH

== France ==
Coach: (France) Laurent Tillie
assistant: Arnaud Josserand

Number	Name	Date of Birth	Height (cm)	2014 Club	Position
1	Jonas Aguenier	28.04.1992	200	(France) Nantes flagicon	MB
2	Jenia Grebennikov	13.08.1990	188	(Germany) VfB Friedrichshafen	L
3	Philippe Tuitoga	18.12.1990	202	(France) Paris Volley	MB
4	Antonin Rouzier	18.08.1986	201	(Italy) Bre Banca Lannutti Cuneo	O
5	Rafael Redwitz	12.08.1980	190	(France) Montpellier UC	S
6	Benjamin Toniutti (C)	30.10.1989	183	(Italy) CMC Ravenna	S
7	Kevin Tillie	02.11.1990	198	(Italy) CMC Ravenna	OH
8	Marien Moreau	25.10.1983	201	(Germany) Munich	O
9	Earvin N’Gapeth	12.02.1991	194	(Italy) Casa Modena	OH
10	Kévin Le Roux	11.05.1989	209	(Italy) Copra Elior Piacenza	MB
11	Julien Lyneel	15.04.1990	192	(France) Montpellier UC	OH
12	Baptiste Geiler	12.03.1987	198	(Germany) VfB Friedrichshafen	OH
13	Ludovic Castard	18.01.1983	195	(France) AS Cannes flagicon	OH
14	Nicolas Le Goff	15.02.1992	204	(France) Montpellier UC	MB
15	Samuel Tuia	24.07.1986	195	(Argentina) UPCN San Juan Volley	OH
16	Nicolas Marechal	04.03.1987	198	(Poland) Jastrzębski Węgiel	OH
17	Franck Lafitte	08.03.1989	203	(France) Montpellier UC	MB
18	Yoann Jaumel	16.09.1987	181	(France) GFCA Ajaccio	S
19	Nicolas Rossard	23.05.1990	183	(France) Arago de Sète	L
20	Thibault Rossard	28.08.1993	195	(France) Spacer's de Toulouse	OH
21	Mory Sidibé	17.06.1987	193	(France) Paris Volley	O
22	Toafa Takaniko	29.05.1985	192	(France) Arago de Sète	S

== Germany ==
Coach: (Belgium) Vital Heynen
assistant: Stefan Hübner

Number	Name	Date of Birth	Height (cm)	2014 Club	Position
1	Christian Fromm	15.08.1990	204	(Italy) Altotevere Città di Castello	OH
2	Markus Steuerwald	07.03.1989	182	(France) Paris Volley	L
3	Ruben Schott	08.07.1994	192	(Germany) SCC Berlin	OH
4	Merten Krüger	08.11.1990	195	(Germany) VSG Coburg/Grub	S
5	Sebastian Kühner	15.03.1987	203	(Germany) SCC Berlin	O
6	Denis Kaliberda	24.06.1990	193	(Italy) Copra Elior Piacenza	OH
7	Dirk Westphal	31.01.1986	203	(Poland) Czarni Radom	MB
8	Marcus Böhme (C)	25.08.1985	211	(Germany) Generali Unterhaching	MB
9	Jan Zimmermann	12.02.1993	190	(Germany) VfB Friedrichshafen	S
10	Jochen Schöps	08.10.1983	200	(Poland) Resovia Rzeszów	O
11	Lukas Kampa	29.11.1986	196	(Italy) Casa Modena	S
12	Ferdinand Tille	08.12.1988	185	(Germany) Generali Unterhaching	L
13	Simon Hirsch	03.04.1992	204	(Germany) Generali Unterhaching	O
14	Tom Strohbach	27.05.1992	196	(Germany) Generali Unterhaching	OH
15	Tim Broshog	02.12.1987	205	(Germany) Moerser SC	MB
16	Marvin Prolingheuer	29.06.1990	209	(Germany) TV Bühl	O
17	Moritz Reichert	15.03.1995	194	(Germany) VI Frankfurt
18	Michael Andrei	06.08.1985	210	(France) Saint Nazaire flagicon Atlantique	MB
19	Björn Höhne	27.03.1991	192	(Germany) TV Bühl	OH
20	Philipp Collin	28.10.1990	204	(France) Tours VB	MB
21	Jaromir Zachrich	14.04.1985	201	(Germany) Evivo Düren	MB
22	Georg Klein	22.08.1991	201	(Germany) Evivo Düren	MB

== Iran ==
Coach: (Serbia) Slobodan Kovač
assistant: Hossein Madani Gh.

Number	Name	Date of Birth	Height (cm)	2014 Club	Position
1	Shahram Mahmoudi	20.07.1988	198	(Iran) Matin Varna	O
2	Saeed Mostafavand	04.02.1983	195	(Iran) Matin Varna	MB
3	Saman Faezi	23.08.1991	204	(Iran) Paykan Teheran VC	MB
4	Saeid Marouf (C)	20.10.1985	189	(Iran) Matin Varna	S
5	Farhad Ghaemi	28.08.1989	197	(Iran) Barij Esans Kaszan	OH
6	Mohammad Mousavi	22.08.1987	203	(Iran) Matin Varna	MB
7	Pourya Fayazi	12.01.1993	194	(Iran) Shahrdari Urmia	OH
8	Farhad Zarif	03.03.1983	165	(Iran) Kalleh Mazandaran VC	L
9	Adel Gholami	09.02.1986	195	(Iran) Kalleh Mazandaran VC	MB
10	Amir Ghafour	06.06.1991	202	(Iran) Barij Esans Kaszan	O
11	Rahman Davoudi	18.02.1988	195	(Iran) Mizan Khorasan VC	OH
12	Mojtaba Mirzajanpour	07.10.1991	195	(Iran) Matin Varna	OH
13	Mehdi Mahdavi	13.02.1984	191	(Iran) Barij Esans Kaszan	S
14	Arash Keshavarzi	16.02.1987	198	(Iran) Paykan Teheran VC
15	Abdolreza Alizadeh	19.02.1987	183	(Iran) Shahrdari Urmia	L
16	Armin Tashakkori	08.12.1986	200	(Iran) Barij Esans Kaszan	MB
17	Reza Ghara	31.07.1991	200	(Iran) Kalleh Mazandaran VC	U
18	Mohammad Taher Vadi	10.10.1989	194	(Iran) Matin Varna	S
19	Mehdi Mahdavi	12.05.1986	172	(Iran) Shahrdari Tabriz VC	L
20	Alireza Mobasheri	10.06.1988	190	(Iran) Mizan Khorasan VC	OH
21	Alireza Jadidi	11.02.1989	202	(Iran) Kalleh Mazandaran VC	MB
22	Milad Ebadipour	17.10.1993	202	(Iran) Kalleh Mazandaran VC	O

== Italy ==
Coach: (Italy) Mauro Berruto
assistant: Andrea Brogioni

Number	Name	Date of Birth	Height (cm)	2014 Club	Position
1	Thomas Beretta	18.04.1990	205	(Italy) Modena Volley	MB
2	Jiří Kovář	10.04.1989	202	(Italy) Cucine Lube Banca	OH
3	Simone Parodi	16.06.1986	196	(Italy) Cucine Lube Banca	OH
4	Luca Vettori	26.04.1991	200	(Italy) Copra Elior Piacenza	O
5	Antonio Corvetta	28.09.1977	188	(Italy) Altotevere Città di Castello	S
6	Gabriele Maruotti	25.03.1988	195	(Italy) Bre Banca Lannutti Cuneo	OH
7	Salvatore Rossini	13.07.1986	185	(Italy) Andreoli Latina	L
8	Davide Saitta	23.06.1987	182	(Italy) Exprivia Molfetta	S
9	Ivan Zaytsev	02.10.1988	202	(Italy) Cucine Lube Banca	OH/A
10	Filippo Lanza	03.03.1991	198	(Italy) Trentino Volley	OH
11	Simone Buti	19.09.1983	206	(Italy) Sir Safety Perugia	MB
12	Daniele Mazzone	04.06.1992	208	(Italy) Exprivia Molfetta	MB
13	Dragan Travica	28.08.1986	200	(Russia) Biełogorje Biełgorod	S
14	Matteo Piano	24.10.1990	208	(Italy) Altotevere Città di Castello	MB
15	Emanuele Birarelli (C)	08.02.1981	202	(Italy) Trentino Volley	MB
16	Michele Baranowicz	05.08.1989	196	(Italy) Cucine Lube Banca	S
17	Andrea Giovi	19.08.1983	183	(Italy) Sir Safety Perugia	L
18	Giulio Sabbi	10.08.1989	201	(Italy) Exprivia Molfetta	O
19	Simone Anzani	24.02.1992	204	(Italy) BluVolley Verona	MB
20	Massimo Colaci	21.02.1985	180	(Italy) Trentino Volley	L
21	Michele Fedrizzi	21.05.1991	192	(Italy) Trentino Volley	OH
22	Luigi Randazzo	30.04.1994	198	(Italy) Tonno Callipo Vibo Valentia	O

== Japan ==
Coach: (Japan) Masashi Nambu
assistant: Koichiro Shimbo

Number	Name	Date of Birth	Height (cm)	2014 Club	Position
1	Kunihiro Shimizu	11.08.1986	192	(Japan) Panasonic Panthers	O
2	Shinji Takahashi	16.07.1980	182	(Japan) Jtekt Stings	S
3	Kongoh Oh	12.05.1984	197	(Japan) Toray Arrows	S
4	Koichiro Koga	30.08.1984	171	(Japan) Toyoda Gosei Trefuerza	L
5	Shogo Toimoto	25.06.1987	197	(Japan) JT Thunders	MB
6	Shohei Uchiyama	01.11.1987	185	(Japan) Toyoda Gosei Trefuerza	S
7	Yu Koshikawa (C)	30.06.1984	189	(Japan) JT Thunders	OH
8	Ryusuke Tsubakiyama	18.07.1988	197	(Japan) Suntory Sunbirds	OH
9	Dai Tezuka	18.11.1988	191	(Japan) FC Tokyo	O
10	Shunsuke Chijiki	06.09.1989	193	(Japan) Sakai Blazers	OH
11	Hideoki Eto	27.12.1989	198	(Japan) FC Tokyo	MB
12	Naoya Shiraiwa	15.02.1990	190	(Japan) Toyoda Gosei Trefuerza	OH
13	Hideomi Fukatsu	01.06.1990	180	(Japan) Panasonic Panthers	S
14	Sogo Watanabe	21.07.1990	196	(Japan) Panasonic Panthers
15	Tatsuya Fukuzawa	01.07.1986	189	(Japan) Panasonic Panthers	OH
16	Takashi Dekita	13.08.1991	199	(Japan) Sakai Blazers	O
17	Takeshi Nagano	11.07.1985	176	(Japan) Panasonic Panthers	L
18	Yuta Yoneyama	29.08.1984	185	(Japan) Toray Arrows	OH
19	Yamato Fushimi	24.12.1991	207	(Japan) Toray Arrows	MB
20	Satoshi Ide	16.01.1992	174	(Japan) Toray Arrows	L
21	Akihiro Yamauchi	30.11.1993	204	(Japan) Aichi Gakuin University	MB
22	Kentaro Takahashi	08.02.1995	200	(Japan) University of Tsukuba	MB

== Korea ==
Coach: (South Korea) Park Ki-won
assistant: Kim Kyounghoon

Number	Name	Date of Birth	Height (cm)	2014 Club	Position
1	Song Myung-Geun	12.03.1993	195	(South Korea) Rush & Cash	OH
2	Han Sun-Soo (C)	16.12.1985	189	(South Korea) Korean Army	S
3	Kim Gwang-Guk	13.08.1987	188	(South Korea) Woori Card	S
4	Jeong Minsu	05.10.1991	178	(South Korea) Woori Card	L
5	Kim Yo-han	16.08.1985	200	(South Korea) LIG Insurance	OH
6	Lee Min-Gyu	03.12.1992	194	(South Korea) Rush & Cash	S
7	Lee Sun-Kyu	14.03.1981	199	(South Korea) Samsung Fire & Marine Insuranc	MB
8	Park Sang-Ha	04.04.1986	198	(South Korea) Korean Army	MB
9	Kwak Seung-Suk	23.03.1988	190	(South Korea) Korean Airlines Co.	OH
10	Bu Yong-Chan	30.11.1989	175	(South Korea) LIG Insurance	L
11	Min-Ho Choi	28.04.1988	198	(South Korea) Hyundai Capital co.	MB
12	Jeon Kwang-In	18.09.1991	194	(South Korea) Kepco 45	OH
13	Park Chul-Woo	25.07.1985	198	(South Korea) Samsung Fire & Marine Insuranc	OH
14	Lee Kang-Joo	30.06.1983	185	(South Korea) Samsung Fire & Marine Insuranc	L
15	Kim Jeong-Hwan	23.03.1988	196	(South Korea) Woori Card	OH
16	Choi Hong-Suk	26.06.1988	195	(South Korea) Woori Card
17	Seo Jae-Duck	21.07.1989	195	(South Korea) Kepco 45	OH
18	Ha Hyun-Yong	09.05.1982	198	(South Korea) LIG Insurance	MB
19	Shin Young-Soo	01.07.1982	197	(South Korea) Korean Airlines Co.	OH
20	Yun Bong-Woo	20.01.1982	199	(South Korea) Hyundai Capital co.	MB
21	Kwon Young-Min	05.07.1980	190	(South Korea) Hyundai Capital co.	S
22	Shin Yung-Suk	04.10.1986	198	(South Korea) Korean Army	MB

== Mexico ==
Coach: (Mexico) Sergio Hernandez
assistant: Ivan Contreras

Number	Name	Date of Birth	Height (cm)	2014 Club	Position
1	Jesus Valdemar Valdés Loredo	05.10.1990	188	(Mexico) Tigres	U
2	Daniel Vargas	01.09.1986	199	(Mexico) Unam	O
3	Marco Antonio Macias Vargas	12.02.1985	193	(Portugal) A.J.Fonte do Bastardo
4	Gustavo Meyer	03.10.1979	193	(Mexico) Unam	OH
5	Jesus Rangel	20.09.1980	193	(Mexico) Halcones	L
6	José Roberto Mendoza Perdomo	31.05.1993	170	(Mexico) Imss	L
7	Jorge Quiñones (C)	13.11.1981	186	(Mexico) Guanajuato
8	Edgar Herrera	22.01.1988	194	(Mexico) Cocoteros
9	Carlos Guerra	03.08.1981	196	(Switzerland) Chenois Geneve Volleyball
10	Pedro Rangel	16.09.1988	194	(Mexico) Moerse	S
11	Jorge Barajas	07.05.1991	187	(Mexico) Tigres	S
12	Ismael Guerrero	15.03.1988	204	(Mexico) Uas	MB
13	Samuel Cordova	13.03.1989	200	(Mexico) Cocoteros	MB
14	Tomas Aguilera	15.11.1988	202	(Mexico) Chihuahua	MB
15	Martin Petris	23.07.1990	195	(Mexico) Halcones
16	Jesus Alberto Perales	22.12.1993	200	(Mexico) Halcones
17	Nestor Orellana	07.01.1992	190	(Mexico) Tigres	O
18	Ignacio Ramirez	17.09.1976	185	(Mexico) Cocoteros
19	Ivan Marquez	02.01.1991	195	(Mexico) Imss
20	Julian Duarte	19.06.1994	200	(Mexico) Sonora
21	Jose Martinez	23.01.1993	200	(Mexico) Imss
22	Gonzalo Ruiz De La Cruz	28.04.1988	186	(Mexico) Imss

== Netherlands ==
Coach: (Netherlands) Edwin Benne
assistant: Arnold van Ree

Number	Name	Date of Birth	Height (cm)	2014 Club	Position
1	Nimir Abdel-Aziz	05.02.1992	201	(Turkey) Ziraat Bankası Ankara	S
2	Yannick van Harskamp	02.04.1986	190	(Belgium) Top Volley Precura Antwerpen	S
3	Daan van Haarlem	15.03.1989	198	(Belgium) Prefaxis Menen	S
4	Thijs Ter Horst	18.09.1991	204	(Italy) Marmi Lanza Verona	OH
5	Jelte Maan	19.03.1986	190	(Belgium) Noliko Maaseik	OH
6	Humphrey Krolis	13.07.1984	194	(Italy) Coserplast Openet Matera	O
7	Gijs Jorna	30.05.1989	195	(Belgium) Top Volley Precura Antwerpen	L
8	Bas van Bemmelen	18.08.1989	207	(Germany) TV Bühl	MB
9	Ewoud Gommans	17.11.1990	202	(Germany) Generali Unterhaching	OH
10	Jeroen Rauwerdink	13.09.1985	200	(Italy) Bre Banca Lannutti Cuneo	OH
11	Dick Kooy (C)	03.12.1987	202	(Poland) ZAKSA Kędzierzyn-Koźle	OH
12	Wytze Kooistra	03.06.1982	209	(Poland) Czarni Radom	MB/A
13	Maarten van Garderen	24.01.1990	200	(Italy) Caffé Aiello Corigliano	OH
14	Niels Klapwijk	19.09.1985	200	(Italy) Tonno Callipo Vibo Valentia	O
15	Thomas Koelewijn	18.12.1988	207	(Belgium) Top Volley Precura Antwerpen	MB
16	Robin Overbeeke	21.03.1989	197	(Belgium) VC Euphony Asse–Lennik	O
17	Michael Parkinson	23.11.1991	203	(Belgium) Noliko Maaseik	MB
18	Robbert Andringa	28.04.1990	194	(Belgium) VC Euphony Asse–Lennik	OH
19	Dirk Sparidans	05.03.1989	179	(Belgium) VC Euphony Asse–Lennik	L
20	Jasper Diefenbach	17.03.1988	195	(Belgium) VC Argex Duvel Puurs	MB
21	Hidde Boswinkel	30.03.1995	202	(Netherlands) Talentteam Papendal-Arnhem	O
22	Nico Freriks	22.12.1981	193	(Iran) Kalleh Mazandaran VC	S

== Poland ==
Coach: (France) Stephane Antiga
assistant: Philippe Blain

Number	Name	Date of Birth	Height (cm)	2014 Club	Position
1	Piotr Nowakowski	18.12.1987	205	(Poland) Resovia Rzeszów	MB
2	Michał Winiarski (C)	28.09.1983	200	(Russia) Fakieł Nowy Urengoj	OH
3	Dawid Konarski	31.08.1989	198	(Poland) Resovia Rzeszów	O
4	Łukasz Wiśniewski	03.02.1989	198	(Poland) ZAKSA Kędzierzyn-Koźle	MB
5	Paweł Zagumny	18.10.1977	200	(Poland) ZAKSA Kędzierzyn-Koźle	S
6	Bartosz Kurek	29.08.1988	205	(Italy) Lube Banca Marche Macerata	OH
7	Karol Kłos	08.08.1989	201	(Argentina) UPCN San Juan Volley	MB
8	Andrzej Wrona	27.12.1988	205	(Argentina) UPCN San Juan Volley	MB
9	Grzegorz Bociek	06.06.1991	206	(Poland) ZAKSA Kędzierzyn-Koźle	O
10	Mariusz Wlazły	04.08.1983	194	(Argentina) UPCN San Juan Volley	O
11	Fabian Drzyzga	03.01.1990	196	(Poland) Resovia Rzeszów	S
12	Paweł Woicki	19.06.1983	182	(Poland) Transfer Bydgoszcz	S
13	Michał Kubiak	18.07.1988	191	(Poland) Jastrzębski Węgiel	OH
14	Michał Ruciak	22.08.1983	189	(Poland) ZAKSA Kędzierzyn-Koźle	OH
15	Łukasz Żygadło	02.08.1979	200	(Russia) Zenit-Kazan	S
16	Krzysztof Ignaczak	15.05.1978	188	(Poland) Resovia Rzeszów	L
17	Paweł Zatorski	21.06.1990	184	(Argentina) UPCN San Juan Volley	L
18	Marcin Możdżonek	09.02.1985	211	(Poland) ZAKSA Kędzierzyn-Koźle	MB
19	Wojciech Ferens	05.04.1991	194	(Poland) ZAKSA Kędzierzyn-Koźle	OH
20	Mateusz Mika	21.01.1991	206	(France) Montpellier HSC	OH
21	Rafał Buszek	28.04.1987	194	(Poland) Indykpol AZS Olsztyn	OH
22	Łukasz Perłowski	03.04.1984	203	(Poland) Resovia Rzeszów	MB

== Portugal ==
Coach: (Portugal) Hugo Silva
assistant: Carlos Plata

Number	Name	Date of Birth	Height (cm)	2014 Club	Position
1	Marcel Keller Gil	08.05.1990	206	(Portugal) S.L. Benfica	MB
2	Ivo Aniceto	25.05.1987	199	(Portugal) Castelo Maia GC	MB
3	João Coelho	24.06.1981	185	(Portugal) S.L. Benfica	L
4	Idner Martins	19.12.1978	195	(Austria) HotVolleys Wiedeń	OH
5	Marco Ferreira	04.10.1987	202	(Portugal) SC Espinho	O
6	Alexandre Ferreira	13.11.1991	203	(Italy) Trentino Volley	OH
7	Ivo Casas	21.09.1992	182	(Portugal) Castelo Maia GC	L
8	Tiago Violas	27.03.1989	193	(Portugal) Vitória Sport Clube	S
9	Nuno Pinheiro	31.12.1984	193	(France) Tours VB	S
10	Bernardo Martins	03.02.1995	185	(Portugal) Castelo Maia GC	OH
11	João Oliveira	31.07.1995	194	(Portugal) S.L. Benfica	OH
12	João José (C)	07.06.1978	195	(Portugal) AJF Bastardo	MB
13	Valdir Sequeira	22.11.1981	196	(Austria) SK Posojilnica Aich/Dob	O
14	Flávio Cruz	28.08.1982	195	(Portugal) S.L. Benfica	OH
15	José Gomes	21.10.1994	198	(Portugal) GC Vilacondense	OH
16	Hugo Gaspar	02.09.1982	200	(Portugal) S.L. Benfica	O
17	Miguel Tavares Rodrigues	02.03.1993	191	(Portugal) S.L. Benfica	S
18	André Lopes	12.09.1982	193	(France) AS Cannes	U
19	Manuel Fernando Silva	28.12.1973	192	(Portugal) SC Espinho	U
20	Filipe Sousa	25.01.1995	199	(Portugal) GC Vilacondense	MB
21	Jose Vieira	06.06.1983	200	(Portugal) CS Maritimo	O
22	Pedro Nogueira	06.10.1991	194	(Portugal) CA Madalena	MB

== Puerto Rico ==
Coach: (Puerto Rico) David Aleman
assistant: Esai Velez

Number	Name	Date of Birth	Height (cm)	2014 Club	Position
1	Jose Rivera	02.07.1977	192	(Puerto Rico) Carolina	OH
2	Edgardo Goás	27.01.1989	197	(Puerto Rico) Arecibo	S
3	Juan Figueroa	06.03.1986	189	(Puerto Rico) Guaynabo	U
4	Dennis Del Valle	27.01.1989	175	(Puerto Rico) Guaynabo	L
5	Roberto Muñiz	11.06.1980	196	(Puerto Rico) Arecibo	U
6	Angel Perez	20.05.1982	190	(Puerto Rico) Guaynabo	S
7	Enrique Escalante	06.08.1984	195	(Puerto Rico) Guaynabo	MB
8	Josue Núñez	07.05.1985	196	(Puerto Rico) Guaynabo
9	Jose Miguel Mulero	25.10.1991	170	(Puerto Rico) Mayaguez	L
10	Ezequiel Cruz	15.07.1986	193	(Puerto Rico) Guaynabo	OH
11	Maurice Torres	06.07.1991	192
12	Héctor Soto	20.06.1978	197	(Puerto Rico) Guaynabo	O
13	Juan Vazquez	23.01.1991	188
14	Mannix Roman	17.01.1983	190	(Puerto Rico) Guaynabo	MB
15	Pablo Guzman	02.06.1987	188	(Puerto Rico) Guaynabo
16	Jackson Rivera	19.08.1987	186	(Puerto Rico) Guaynabo	OH
17	Pedrito Sierra	21.07.1989	196	(Puerto Rico) Fajardo
18	Jean Carlos Ortiz	23.02.1988	193	(Puerto Rico) Guaynabo	O
19	Sequiel Sanchez	24.03.1990	182	(Puerto Rico) Guaynabo	OH
20	Fernando Morales	04.02.1982	186	(Puerto Rico) Guaynabo	S
21	Jon H. Rivera	05.01.1996	193
22	Brian Negron	15.02.1996	199

== Russia ==
Coach: (Russia) Andriej Woronkow
assistant: Sergio Busato

Number	Name	Date of Birth	Height (cm)	2014 Club	Position
1	Dmitry Kovalev	15.03.1991	198	(Russia) Prikamje Perm	S
2	Siergiej Makarow	28.03.1980	196	(Russia) Kuzbass Kemerovo	S
3	Nikolay Apalikov	26.08.1982	203	(Russia) Zenit Kazan	MB
4	Taras Khtey (C)	22.05.1982	205	(Russia) Lokomotiv Belgorod	OH
5	Sergey Grankin	21.01.1985	195	(Russia) Dinamo Moskwa	S
6	Evgeny Sivozhelez	06.08.1986	196	(Russia) Zenit Kazan	OH
7	Nikolay Pavlov	22.05.1982	196	(Russia) ASK Nizhny Novgorod	O
8	Denis Biryukov	08.12.1988	202	(Russia) Dinamo Moskwa	OH
9	Alexey Spiridonov	26.06.1988	196	(Russia) Fakel Novy Urengoy	OH
10	Sergey Savin	07.10.1988	201	(Russia) ASK Nizhny Novgorod	OH
11	Alexey Ostapenko	26.05.1986	208	(Russia) ASK Nizhny Novgorod	MB
12	Artem Smoliar	04.02.1985	209	(Russia) Gazprom-Jugra Surgut	MB
13	Dmitriy Muserskiy	29.10.1988	218	(Russia) Lokomotiv Belgorod	MB
14	Artem Volvich	22.01.1990	208	(Russia) Lokomotiv Novosibirsk	MB
15	Dmitriy Ilinykh	31.01.1987	201	(Russia) Lokomotiv Belgorod	OH
16	Alexey Verbov	31.01.1982	183	(Russia) Zienit Kazań	L
17	Maxim Mikhaylov	19.03.1988	202	(Russia) Zenit Kazan	O
18	Aleksiej Rodicziew	24.03.1988	196	(Russia) Gazprom-Jugra Surgut	O/P
19	Maxim Zhigalov	26.07.1989	201	(Russia) Lokomotiw Biełgorod	O
20	Artem Ermakov	16.03.1982	188	(Russia) Dinamo Moskwa	L
21	Valentin Golubev	03.05.1992	190	(Russia) Lokomotiv Novosibirsk	L
22	Denis Zemchenok	11.08.1987	203	(Russia) Dinamo Krasnodar	O

== Serbia ==
Coach: (Montenegro) Igor Kolaković
assistant: Strahinja Kozić

Number	Name	Date of Birth	Height (cm)	2014 Club	Position
1	Nikola Kovačević	14.02.1983	193	(Italy) Calzedonia Verona	OH
2	Uroš Kovačević	06.05.1993	197	(Italy) Modena Volley	OH
3	Marko Ivović	22.12.1990	192	(France) Paris Volley	OH
4	Nemanja Petrić	28.07.1987	202	(Italy) Sir Volley	OH
5	Vlado Petković	06.01.1983	198	(Iran) Shahrdari Urmia	S
6	Filip Stoilović	11.10.1992	196	(Serbia) OK Crvena zvezda Belgrad	OH
7	Dragan Stanković (C)	18.10.1985	205	(Italy) Lube Banca Macerata	MB
8	Milan Katić	22.10.1993	201	(Serbia) OK Vojvodina Nowy Sad	OH
9	Nikola Jovović	13.02.1992	197	(Germany) VfB Friedrichshafen	S
10	Miloš Nikić	31.03.1986	194	(Bulgaria) Gubiernija Niżny Nowogród	OH
11	Mihajlo Mitić	17.09.1990	201	(Italy) Sir Volley	S
12	Dejan Radić	06.11.1984	200	(Serbia) OK Vojvodina Nowy Sad	MB
13	Dušan Petković	27.01.1992	202	(Serbia) OK Crvena zvezda Belgrad	O
14	Aleksandar Atanasijević	04.09.1991	200	(Italy) Sir Volley	O
15	Saša Starović	19.10.1988	207	(Italy) Andreoli Latina	O
16	Aleksa Brđović	29.07.1993	201	(Argentina) UPCN San Juan Volley	S
17	Neven Majstorović	17.03.1989	192	(Serbia) Partizan Vizura Belgrad	L
18	Marko Podraščanin	29.08.1987	204	(Italy) Lube Banca Macerata	MB
19	Nikola Rosić	05.08.1984	192	(Eswatini) PV Lugano	L
20	Srećko Lisinac	17.05.1992	205	(Germany) SCC Berlin	MB
21	Petar Krsmanović	01.06.1990	206	(Serbia) Djerdap Kladovo	MB
22	Aleksandar Okolić	26.06.1993	204	(Serbia) OK Crvena zvezda Belgrad	MB

== Slovakia ==
Coach: (Italy) Flavio Gulinelli
assistant: Marek Kardoš

Number	Name	Date of Birth	Height (cm)	2014 Club	Position
1	Milan Bencz	05.09.1987	206	(Italy) Itely Milano	O
2	Tomáš Kriško	19.12.1988	202	(Slovakia) Spartak VKP Myjava	MB
3	Emanuel Kohút (C)	21.07.1982	206	(Italy) Bre Banca Lannutti Cuneo	MB
4	Martin Repak	31.03.1981	191	(France) Saint-Nazaire flagiconA	S
5	Matej Kubš	26.05.1988	188	(Slovakia) VK Prievidza	L
6	Martin Vlk	09.07.1984	191	(Poland) BBTS Siatkarz	OH
7	Tomáš Halanda	25.04.1992	195	(Germany) CV Mitteldeutschland	O
8	Michal Červeň	16.12.1977	205	(France) GFCO Ajaccio Volley-Ball	MB
9	Roman Ondrusek	06.02.1980	191	(France) Cambrai Volley	L
10	Igor Rehák	31.03.1989	200	(Czech Republic) VK Ostrava	O
11	Peter Janusek	25.04.1983	200	(Greece) Foinikas SC Syros Island	OH
12	Matej Paták	08.06.1990	197	(France) Beauvais Oise UC	OH
13	Martin Sopko	30.01.1982	195	(Turkey) Galatasaray Istanbul	OH
14	Šimon Krajčovič	28.06.1996	205	(Slovakia) COP Trenczyn	MB
15	Juraj Zaťko	05.06.1987	192	(Poland) AZS Politechnika Warszawska	S
16	Jozef Piovarči	09.11.1984	206	(Poland) Czarni Radom	MB
17	František Ogurčák	24.04.1984	198	(Italy) Tonno Callipo Vibo Valentia	OH
18	Lubos Kostolani	28.11.1990	203	(Czech Republic) VSC Zlín	OH
19	Michal Hruška	13.03.1987	197	(Austria) SK Aich/Dob	MB
20	Peter Kasper	12.03.1985	201	(Poland) MKS Cuprum Lubin	MB
21	Miroslav Jakubov	04.06.1987	197	(Slovakia) Chemes Humenne
22	Filip Palgut	23.09.1991	202	(Germany) CV Mitteldeutschland	S

== Spain ==
Coach: (Spain) Fernando Muñoz
assistant: Carlos Carreño

Number	Name	Date of Birth	Height (cm)	2014 Club	Position
1	Guillermo Hernán (C)	25.07.1982	181	(France) Paris Volley	S
2	Ángel Trinidad	27.03.1993	193	(Italy) Tonno Callipo Vibo Valentia	S
3	Mario Ferrera	18.01.1987	187	(France) Avignon Aflagicon	OH
4	Manuel Sevillano	02.07.1981	194	(France) Saint Nazaire Atlantique	L
5	Alejandro Vigil	11.02.1993	204	(Italy) Vero Volley Monza	MB
6	José Miguel Sugrañes Martínez	25.08.1985	201	(Finland) Raision Loimu	MB
7	Gustavo Delgado Escribano	21.01.1986	192	(France) Narbonne Volley	OH
8	Marc Altayó Ruiz	17.05.1986	202	(Spain) CAI Teruel	MB
9	Daniel Rocamora Blazquez	27.05.1988	203	(Spain) CV Almería	MB
10	Jorge Fernández Valcárcel	04.05.1989	201	(France) Nantes Rezé MV	MB
11	Juan Manuel González Limón	11.01.1994	192	(Italy) Marmi Lanza Verona	OH
12	Gerard Osorio	29.03.1993	200	(France) ASUL Lyon Volley	OH
13	Antoni Llabres	20.11.1991	189	(Spain) CV Almería	L
14	Miguel Angel Fornes	06.09.1993	200	(Italy) Exprivia Molfetta	MB
15	Andrés J. Villena	27.02.1993	194	(Italy) Tonno Callipo Vibo Valentia	O
16	Juan Carlos Barcala	25.01.1984	201	(Spain) CAI Teruel	O
17	Francisco J. Ruiz	07.06.1991	178	(Spain) Cajasol Juvasa	L
18	Israel Rodríguez Calderon	27.08.1981	194	(Italy) C.V.M. Tomis Constanța	OH
19	Pablo Bugallo	20.11.1991	196	(Spain) CV Almería	MB
20	Carlos Jiménez	12.08.1995	192	(Spain) Santo Domingo Petrer	OH
21	Víctor Manuel Viciana Mera	02.10.1983	187	(Spain) CAI Teruel	S
22	Ignacio Sánchez	24.02.1991	191	(Spain) Cajasol Juvasa	S

== Tunisia ==
Coach: (Tunisia) Fethi Mkaouar
assistant: Riadh Hedhili

Number	Name	Date of Birth	Height (cm)	2014 Club	Position
1	Saddem Hmissi	16.02.1991	186	(Tunisia) E.S.Tunis	L
2	Ahmed Kadhi	19.04.1989	199	(Tunisia) E.S.Sahel	MB
3	Marouane M'rabet	05.06.1985	186	(Tunisia) E.S.Sahel	S
4	Marouen Garci	21.03.1988	197	(Tunisia) E.S.Sahel	O
5	Samir Sellami (C)	13.07.1977	195	(Tunisia) C.S.Sfaxien	S
6	Mohamed Ali Ben Othmen Miladi	12.05.1991	188	(Tunisia) C.O.Kélibia	O
7	Elyes Karamosli	22.08.1989	198	(Tunisia) E.S.Tunis	OH
8	Mohamed Ben Slimane	29.11.1981	187	(Tunisia) E.S.Tunis	S
9	Hakim Zouari	28.03.1988	197	(Tunisia) C.S.Sfaxien	MB
10	Hamza Nagga	29.05.1990	191	(Tunisia) E.S.Sahel	O
11	Ismail Moalla	30.01.1990	195	(Tunisia) C.S.Sfaxien	U
12	Anouer Taouerghi	17.08.1983	178	(Tunisia) C.S.Sfaxien	L
13	Noureddine Hfaiedh	27.08.1973	200	(Tunisia) C.S.Sfaxien	O
14	Bilel Ben Hassine	22.06.1983	195	(Tunisia) E.S.Tunis	MB
15	Hichem Kaabi	13.09.1986	194	(Tunisia) E.S.Tunis	O
16	Khaled Ben Slimene	14.12.1994	193	(Tunisia) C.O.Kélibia
17	Mohamed Arbi Ben Abdallah	03.01.1991	196	(Tunisia) C.S.Sfaxien
18	Mohamed Ayech	31.03.1991	198	(Tunisia) E.S.Sahel	U
19	Bahri Messaoud	21.06.1991	185	(Tunisia) E.S.Sahel	U
20	Omar Agrebi	26.08.1992	205	(Tunisia) C.S.Sfaxien	MB
21	Nabil Miladi	28.02.1988	196	(Tunisia) E.S.Tunis	MB
22	Skander Ben Tara	22.01.1985	205	(Tunisia) E.S.Tunis	MB

== Turkey ==
Coach: (Italy) Emanuele Zanini
assistant: Alper Hamurcu

Number	Name	Date of Birth	Height (cm)	2014 Club	Position
1	Mustafa Koç	23.02.1992	202	(Turkey) Arkas Spor Izmir	MB
2	Turgay Doğan	14.02.1984	190	(Turkey) Fenerbahçe Stambuł
3	Arslan Ekşi (C)	17.07.1985	198	(Turkey) Fenerbahçe Stambuł	S
4	Metin Toy	03.05.1994	202	(Turkey) Fenerbahçe Stambuł	O
5	Hasan Yeşilbudak	11.01.1984	192	(Turkey) Arkas Spor Izmir	L
6	Kemal Kayhan	02.01.1983	200	(Turkey) Fenerbahçe Stambuł	MB
7	Baturalp Burak Güngör	28.07.1993	189	(Turkey) Ziraat Bankası Ankara
8	Burutay Subaşı	15.07.1990	195	(Turkey) Halkbank Ankara
9	Caner Çiçekoğlu	11.05.1985	190	(Turkey) Konak Belediye
10	Emre Batur	21.04.1988	202	(Turkey) Halkbank Ankara	MB/P
11	Yiğit Gülmezoğlu	28.12.1995	194	(Turkey) Arkas Spor Izmir	S
12	Tomi Čošković	22.04.1979	200	(Turkey) Büyükşehir Belediyesi Stambuł	OH
13	Emin Gök	15.02.1988	202	(Turkey) Fenerbahçe Stambuł	MB
14	Faik Samet Güneş	27.05.1993	203	(Turkey) Fenerbahçe Stambuł
15	Cansın Ogbai Enaboifo	07.09.1995	193	(Turkey) Çankaya Belediye	O
16	Cüneyt Dağcı	13.02.1985	209	(Turkey) Ziraat Bankası Ankara
17	Murat Yenipazar	01.01.1993	193	(Turkey) Konak Belediye
18	Ufuk Minici	20.01.1991	201	(Turkey) Bornova Anadolu Lisesi
19	Burak Mert	23.10.1990	185	(Turkey) Büyükşehir Belediyesi Stambuł	L
20	Faik Yaz	09.04.1984	199	(Turkey) Tokat Plevne Belediye
21	Yasin Aydın	11.07.1995	190	(Turkey) Tofaş Spor	OH
22	Murat Karakaya	27.06.1987	190	(Turkey) Ziraat Bankası Ankara

== United States ==
Coach: (United States) John Speraw
assistant: Matt Fuerbringer

Number	Name	Date of Birth	Height (cm)	2014 Club	Position
1	Matthew Anderson	18.04.1987	208	(Russia) Zenit Kazan	OH
2	Sean Rooney (C)	13.11.1982	206	(South Korea) Woori Card Hansea	OH
3	Taylor Sander	17.03.1992	196	(United States) Brigham Young University	OH
4	David Lee	08.03.1982	203	(China) Shanghai Volleyball Club	MB
5	Ryan Ammerman	30.12.1985	205	(United States) USA Men's Volleyball Team	S
6	Paul Lotman	03.11.1985	200	(Poland) Resovia Rzeszów	OH
7	Kawika Shoji	11.11.1987	190	(Germany) SCC Berlin	L
8	William Priddy	01.10.1977	194	(United States) USA Men's Volleyball Team	OH
9	Murphy Troy	31.05.1989	202	(France) St. Nazaire V.B. Atlantique	O
10	Antonio Ciarelli	13.04.1990	183	(United States) USA Men's Volleyball Team	OH
11	Micah Christenson	08.05.1993	198	(United States) University of Southern California	S
12	Russell Holmes	01.07.1982	205	(Turkey) Büyükşehir Belediyesi Stambuł	MB
13	Vaafuti Tavana	25.09.1987	200	(France) Toulouse O.A.C.-T.U.C.	MB
14	Jeffrey Menzel	31.10.1988	199	(Belgium) Noliko Maaseik	O
15	Carson Clark	20.01.1989	205	(Poland) Transfer Bydgoszcz	O
16	Dustin Watten	27.10.1986	182	(France) A.S. Orange Nassau	L
17	Maxwell Holt	12.03.1987	205	(Russia) Dynamo Moscow	MB
18	Garrett Muagututia	26.02.1988	205	(Poland) Transfer Bydgoszcz	OH
19	Alfredo Reft	15.12.1982	178	(United States) USA Men's Volleyball Team	L
20	David Smith	15.05.1985	201	(France) Tours VB	MB
21	James Shaw	05.03.1994	203	(United States) Stanford University	S/A
22	Erik Shoji	24.08.1989	184	(Austria) Hypo Tirol Innsbruck	L
