= 2019 Men's European Volleyball Championship squads =

This article shows all participating team squads at the 2019 Men's European Volleyball Championship, held in France, Slovenia, Belgium and Netherlands from 13 to 29 September 2019.

== Pool A ==
=== Bulgaria ===
The following is the Bulgarian roster in the 2019 European Championship.

- Head Coach: (Italy) Silvano Prandi

No.	Name	Date of birth	Height	Weight	Spike	Block	2019 club
3	Dobromir Dimitrov						
4	Martin Atanasov						
5	Svetoslav Gotsev						
8	Todor Skrimov						
9	Georgi Seganov						
12	Viktor Yosifov						
13	Teodor Salparov						
14	Teodor Todorov						
15	Venelin Kadankov						
17	Nikolay Penchev						
19	Tsvetan Sokolov						
20	Aleks Grozdanov						
21	Petar Karakashev						
30	Georgi Petrov						

=== France ===
The following is the French roster in the 2019 European Championship.

- Head Coach: Laurent Tillie

No.	Name	Date of birth	Height	Weight	Spike	Block	2019 club
2	Jenia Grebennikov						
4	Jean Patry						
6	Benjamin Toniutti						
7	Kévin Tillie						
8	Julien Lyneel						
9	Earvin N'Gapeth						
10	Kévin Le Roux						
11	Antoine Brizard						
12	Stéphen Boyer						
14	Nicolas Le Goff						
16	Daryl Bultor						
17	Trévor Clévenot						
18	Thibault Rossard						
21	Barthélémy Chinenyeze						

=== Greece ===
The following is the Greek roster in the 2019 European Championship.

- Head Coach: Dimitris Andreopoulos

No.	Name	Date of birth	Height	Weight	Spike	Block	2019 club
1	Dimitrios Zisis						
3	Nikos Zoupani						
4	Iraklis Papadopoulos						
5	Dmytro Filippov						
6	Konstantinos Stivachtis						
7	Georgios Petreas						
9	Menelaos Kokkinakis						
10	Rafail Koumentakis						
11	Alexandros Raptis						
12	Theodoros Voulkidis						
14	Panagiotis Pelekoudas						
15	Andreas-Dimitrios Frangos						
17	Athanasios Protopsaltis						
19	Georgios Papalexiou						

=== Italy ===
The following is the Italian roster in the 2019 European Championship.

- Head Coach: Gianlorenzo Blengini

No.	Name	Date of birth	Height	Weight	Spike	Block	2019 club
1	Davide Candellaro						
2	Riccardo Sbertoli						
5	Osmany Juantorena						
6	Simone Giannelli						
9	Ivan Zaytsev						
10	Filippo Lanza						
11	Fabio Balaso						
13	Massimo Colaci						
14	Matteo Piano						
15	Roberto Russo						
16	Oleg Antonov						
17	Simone Anzani						
19	Daniele Lavia						
20	Gabriele Nelli						

=== Portugal ===
The following is the Portuguese roster in the 2019 European Championship.

- Head Coach: Carlos Prata, Hugo Silva

No.	Name	Date of birth	Height	Weight	Spike	Block	2019 club
3	Nuno Teixeira						
4	Filip Cveticanin						
6	Alexandre Ferreira						
7	Marco Ferreira						
8	Tiago Violas						
9	João Simões						
10	Phelipe Martins						
11	Bruno Cunha						
12	Lourenço Martins						
14	Guilherme Menezes						
15	Miguel Tavares Rodrigues						
17	Joao Fidalgo						
18	Januario Alvar						
19	Miguel Cunha						

=== Romania ===
The following is the Romanian roster in the 2019 European Championship.

- Head Coach: Danut Pascu

No.	Name	Date of birth	Height	Weight	Spike	Block	2019 club
1	Ciprian Matei						
2	Liviu Cristudor						
5	Razvan Mihalcea						
6	Claudiu Dumitru						
8	Mihai Gheorghita						
9	Robert Aciobanitei						
10	Cristian Bartha						
11	Laurențiu Lică						
12	Marian Bala						
15	Silviu-Ioan Suson						
16	Rares Balean						
17	Vlad Kantor						
18	Razvan Olteanu						
19	Andrei Spinu						

== Pool B ==
=== Austria ===
The following is the Austrian roster in the 2019 European Championship.

- Head Coach: (Germany) Michael Warm

No.	Name	Date of birth	Height	Weight	Spike	Block	2019 club
1	Philipp Kroiss						
2	Maximilian Landfahrer						
3	Peter Wohlfahrtstätter						
4	Niklas Kronthaler						
5	Thomas Tröthann						
6	Anton Menner						
8	Alexander Tusch						
9	Thomas Zass						
12	Alexander Berger						
13	Maximilian Thaller						
14	Florian Ringseis						
15	Nicolai Grabmüller						
17	Mathäus Jurkovics						
21	Edin Ibrahimovic						

=== Belgium ===
The following is the Belgian roster in the 2019 European Championship.

- Head Coach: Brecht Van Kerckhove

No.	Name	Date of birth	Height	Weight	Spike	Block	2019 club
1	Bram Van Den Dries						
2	Hendrik Tuerlinckx						
3	Sam Deroo						
4	Stijn D'Hulst						
5	Igor Grobelny						
6	Lowie Stuer						
8	Arno Van De Velde						
10	Simon Van De Voorde						
14	Jelle Ribbens						
15	Lienert Cosemans						
16	Matthias Valkiers						
17	Tomas Rousseaux						
18	Seppe Baetens						
22	Pieter Coolman						

=== Germany ===
The following is the German roster in the 2019 European Championship.

- Head Coach: (Italy) Andrea Giani

No.	Name	Date of birth	Height	Weight	Spike	Block	2019 club
1	Christian Fromm						
2	Tobias Krick						
3	Ruben Schott						
5	Moritz Reichert						
6	Denys Kaliberda						
8	Marcus Böhme						
9	György Grozer						
10	Julian Zenger						
11	Lukas Kampa						
12	Anton Brehme						
13	Simon Hirsch						
14	Moritz Karlitzek						
15	Noah Baxpöhler						
17	Jan Zimmermann						

=== Serbia ===
The following is the Serbian roster in the 2019 European Championship.

Head coach: Slobodan Kovač

No.	Name	Date of birth	Height	Weight	Spike	Block	2018–19 club
1	Aleksandar Okolić	26 June 1993	2.05 m (6 ft 9 in)	93 kg (205 lb)	347 cm (137 in)	325 cm (128 in)	(Greece) PAOK Thessaloniki
2	Uroš Kovačević	6 May 1993	1.97 m (6 ft 6 in)	90 kg (200 lb)	355 cm (140 in)	338 cm (133 in)	(Italy) Trentino
4	Nemanja Petrić (C)	28 July 1987	2.03 m (6 ft 8 in)	96 kg (212 lb)	350 cm (140 in)	320 cm (130 in)	(Russia) Belogorie
5	Lazar Ćirović	26 February 1992	2.01 m (6 ft 7 in)	88 kg (194 lb)	348 cm (137 in)	329 cm (130 in)	(Italy) Padova
6	Nikola Peković	6 March 1990	1.76 m (5 ft 9 in)	77 kg (170 lb)	305 cm (120 in)	300 cm (120 in)	(Serbia) Partizan
7	Petar Krsmanović	1 June 1990	2.05 m (6 ft 9 in)	101 kg (223 lb)	354 cm (139 in)	349 cm (137 in)	(Russia) Surgut
8	Marko Ivović	22 December 1990	1.94 m (6 ft 4 in)	89 kg (196 lb)	365 cm (144 in)	330 cm (130 in)	(Russia) Lokomotiv Novosibirsk
9	Nikola Jovović	13 February 1992	1.97 m (6 ft 6 in)	82 kg (181 lb)	335 cm (132 in)	315 cm (124 in)	(Turkey) Ziraat Ankara
14	Aleksandar Atanasijević	4 September 1991	2.02 m (6 ft 8 in)	99 kg (218 lb)	360 cm (140 in)	338 cm (133 in)	(Italy) Perugia
16	Dražen Luburić	2 November 1993	2.02 m (6 ft 8 in)	90 kg (200 lb)	337 cm (133 in)	331 cm (130 in)	(Turkey) Halkbank Ankara
17	Neven Majstorović	17 March 1989	1.93 m (6 ft 4 in)	90 kg (200 lb)	335 cm (132 in)	325 cm (128 in)	(Romania) Craiova
18	Marko Podraščanin	29 August 1987	2.04 m (6 ft 8 in)	101 kg (223 lb)	358 cm (141 in)	340 cm (130 in)	(Italy) Perugia
20	Srećko Lisinac	17 May 1992	2.05 m (6 ft 9 in)	90 kg (200 lb)	370 cm (150 in)	350 cm (140 in)	(Italy) Trentino
21	Vuk Todorović	23 April 1998	1.90 m (6 ft 3 in)	80 kg (180 lb)	315 cm (124 in)	305 cm (120 in)	(Serbia) Vojvodina

=== Slovakia ===
The following is the Slovak roster in the 2019 European Championship.

- Head Coach: (Greece) Andrej Kravárik

No.	Name	Date of birth	Height	Weight	Spike	Block	2019 club
1	Peter Michalovič						
2	Tomáš Kriško						
3	Filip Mačuha						
6	Filip Palgut						
8	Peter Ondrovič						
10	Marcel Lux						
11	Marian Vitko						
12	Matej Paták						
13	Jakub Ihnat						
14	Šimon Krajčovič						
15	Juraj Zaťko						
16	Jakub Kovač						
19	Filip Gavenda						
22	Julius Firkal						

=== Spain ===
The following is the Spanish roster in the 2019 European Championship.

- Head Coach: Fernando Muñoz

No.	Name	Date of birth	Height	Weight	Spike	Block	2019 club
1	Augusto Colito						
2	Ángel Trinidad						
3	Víctor Rodríguez Perez						
7	Jordi Ramón Ferragut						
9	Alejandro Vigil						
10	Jorge Fernández Valcárcel						
11	Miguel Ángel De Amo						
13	Andrés Villena						
14	Miguel Ángel Fornés						
15	Antoni Piris Guiscafré						
16	Juan Manuel González						
18	Aaron Gamiz						
19	Emilio Ferrández Moles						
23	Mario Ferrera						

== Pool C ==
=== Belarus ===
The following is the Belarisian roster in the 2019 European Championship.

- Head Coach: Viktar Beksha

No.	Name	Date of birth	Height	Weight	Spike	Block	2019 club
1	Andrei Radziuk						
4	Siarhei Antanovich						
5	Siarhei Busel						
8	Viachaslau Shmat						
11	Stanislau Zabarouski						
13	Ilya Burau						
15	Kanstantsin Tsiushkevich						
17	Radzivon Miskevich						
19	Viachaslau Charapovich						
20	Pavel Kuklinski						
21	Aliaksei Kurash						
22	Maksim Marozau						
23	Artur Udrys						
61	Raman Aplevich						

=== Finland ===
The following is the Finnish roster in the 2019 European Championship.

- Head Coach: (United Kingdom) Joel Banks

No.	Name	Date of birth	Height	Weight	Spike	Block	2019 club
2	Eemi Tervaportti						
3	Antti Siltala						
4	Lauri Kerminen						
6	Antti Ronkainen						
7	Niko Suihkonen						
8	Elviss Krastins						
9	Tommi Siirilä						
10	Urpo Sivula						
11	Sauli Sinkkonen						
12	Samuli Kaislasalo						
14	Markus Kaurto						
15	Henrik Porkka						
18	Akseli Lankinen						
21	Fedor Ivanov						

=== North Macedonia ===
The following is the Macedonian roster in the 2019 European Championship.

- Head Coach: (Serbia) Nikola Matijašević

No.	Name	Date of birth	Height	Weight	Spike	Block	2019 club
1	Darko Angelovski						
2	Gjorgi Gjorgiev						
3	Risto Nikolov						
4	Nikola Gjorgiev						
5	Vlado Milev						
7	Slave Nakov						
8	Aleksandar Ljaftov						
10	Aleksandar Milkov						
11	Filip Despotovski						
12	Filip Nikolovski						
14	Ivan Andonov						
15	Filip Madjunkov						
16	Stojan Iliev						
18	Vase Mihailov						

=== Russia ===
The following is the Russian roster in the 2019 European Championship.

- Head Coach: (Finland) Tuomas Sammelvuo

No.	Name	Date of birth	Height	Weight	Spike	Block	2019 club
4	Artem Volvich	22 January 1990 (aged 29)	2.11 m (6 ft 11 in)	97 kg (214 lb)	350 cm (140 in)	330 cm (130 in)	(Russia) Zenit-Kazan
6	Anton Karpukhov	23 April 1988 (aged 31)	1.99 m (6 ft 6 in)	90 kg (200 lb)	345 cm (136 in)	330 cm (130 in)	(Russia) Kuzbass Kemerovo
7	Dmitry Volkov	25 May 1995 (aged 24)	2.01 m (6 ft 7 in)	93 kg (205 lb)	338 cm (133 in)	328 cm (129 in)	(Russia) Fakel Novy Urengoy
8	Anton Semyshev	22 August 1997 (aged 22)	2.04 m (6 ft 8 in)	82 kg (181 lb)	353 cm (139 in)	340 cm (130 in)	(Russia) VC Belogorie
9	Ivan Iakovlev	17 April 1995 (aged 24)	2.05 m (6 ft 9 in)	86 kg (190 lb)	357 cm (141 in)	336 cm (132 in)	(Russia) Fakel Novy Urengoy
12	Aleksandr Butko	18 March 1986 (aged 33)	1.98 m (6 ft 6 in)	87 kg (192 lb)	250 cm (98 in)	249 cm (98 in)	(Russia) Zenit-Kazan
13	Dmitry Muserskiy	29 October 1988 (aged 30)	2.18 m (7 ft 2 in)	115 kg (254 lb)	367 cm (144 in)	342 cm (135 in)	(Japan) Suntory Sunbirds
15	Viktor Poletaev	27 July 1995 (aged 24)	1.97 m (6 ft 6 in)	86 kg (190 lb)	355 cm (140 in)	340 cm (130 in)	(Russia) Kuzbass Kemerovo
16	Yevgeni Andreyev	6 January 1995 (aged 24)	1.80 m (5 ft 11 in)	66 kg (146 lb)	306 cm (120 in)	300 cm (120 in)	(Russia) Gazprom-Ugra Surgut
17	Maksim Mikhaylov	19 March 1988 (aged 31)	2.02 m (6 ft 8 in)	98 kg (216 lb)	345 cm (136 in)	330 cm (130 in)	(Russia) Zenit-Kazan
18	Egor Kliuka	15 June 1995 (aged 24)	2.08 m (6 ft 10 in)	96 kg (212 lb)	350 cm (140 in)	340 cm (130 in)	(Russia) Fakel Novy Urengoy
20	Ilyas Kurkaev	18 January 1994 (aged 25)	2.08 m (6 ft 10 in)	96 kg (212 lb)	355 cm (140 in)	335 cm (132 in)	(Russia) Lokomotiv Novosibirsk
24	Igor Kobzar	13 April 1991 (aged 28)	1.96 m (6 ft 5 in)	86 kg (190 lb)	340 cm (130 in)	330 cm (130 in)	(Russia) Kuzbass Kemerovo
27	Valentin Golubev	3 May 1992 (aged 27)	1.88 m (6 ft 2 in)	79 kg (174 lb)	321 cm (126 in)	315 cm (124 in)	(Russia) VC Belogorie

=== Slovenia ===
The following is the Slovenian roster in the 2019 European Championship.

- Head Coach: (Italy) Alberto Giuliani

No.	Name	Date of birth	Height	Weight	Spike	Block	2019 club
1	Tonček Štern	14 November 1995 (aged 23)	2.00 m (6 ft 7 in)	93 kg (205 lb)	345 cm (136 in)	330 cm (130 in)	(Qatar) Al Arabi
2	Alen Pajenk	23 April 1986 (aged 33)	2.03 m (6 ft 8 in)	93 kg (205 lb)	357 cm (141 in)	330 cm (130 in)	(Poland) Cerrad Czarni Radom
4	Jan Kozamernik	14 December 1995 (aged 23)	2.05 m (6 ft 9 in)	100 kg (220 lb)	354 cm (139 in)	336 cm (132 in)	(Italy) Allianz Milano
5	Alen Šket	28 March 1988 (aged 31)	2.05 m (6 ft 9 in)	90 kg (200 lb)	350 cm (140 in)	325 cm (128 in)	(Turkey) Halkbank Ankara
6	Mitja Gasparini	26 June 1984 (aged 35)	2.02 m (6 ft 8 in)	93 kg (205 lb)	346 cm (136 in)	333 cm (131 in)	(South Korea) Korean Air Jumbos
9	Dejan Vinčić	15 September 1986 (aged 32)	2.00 m (6 ft 7 in)	93 kg (205 lb)	344 cm (135 in)	328 cm (129 in)	(Poland) Cerrad Czarni Radom
10	Sašo Štalekar	3 May 1996 (aged 23)	2.14 m (7 ft 0 in)	102 kg (225 lb)	354 cm (139 in)	339 cm (133 in)	(Slovenia) Calcit Kamnik
11	Žiga Štern	2 January 1994 (aged 25)	1.93 m (6 ft 4 in)	86 kg (190 lb)	345 cm (136 in)	328 cm (129 in)	(Italy) Top Volley Latina
12	Jan Klobučar	11 December 1992 (aged 26)	1.95 m (6 ft 5 in)	89 kg (196 lb)	345 cm (136 in)	329 cm (130 in)	(Italy) Gas Sales Piacenza
13	Jani Kovačič	14 June 1992 (aged 27)	1.86 m (6 ft 1 in)	83 kg (183 lb)	320 cm (130 in)	310 cm (120 in)	(Slovenia) ACH Volley
15	Matic Videčnik	31 July 1993 (aged 26)	2.03 m (6 ft 8 in)	90 kg (200 lb)	350 cm (140 in)	340 cm (130 in)	(Slovenia) ACH Volley
16	Gregor Ropret	1 March 1989 (aged 30)	1.91 m (6 ft 3 in)	91 kg (201 lb)	338 cm (133 in)	320 cm (130 in)	(France) Nantes Rezé MV
17	Tine Urnaut	3 September 1988 (aged 31)	2.00 m (6 ft 7 in)	90 kg (200 lb)	355 cm (140 in)	340 cm (130 in)	(Italy) Leo Shoes Modena
18	Klemen Čebulj	21 February 1992 (aged 27)	2.02 m (6 ft 8 in)	94 kg (207 lb)	367 cm (144 in)	345 cm (136 in)	(China) Shanghai Golden Age

=== Turkey ===
The following is the Turkish roster in the 2019 European Championship.

- Head Coach: Nedim Özbey

No.	Name	Date of birth	Height	Weight	Spike	Block	2019 club
1	Selçuk Keskin						
2	Batuhan Avci						
4	Baturalp Burak Güngör						
6	İzzet Ünver						
7	Vahit Emre Savaş						
10	Arslan Ekşi						
11	Yiğit Gülmezoğlu						
12	Adis Lagumdžija						
13	Oğuzhan Karasu						
14	Faik Samet Güneş						
15	Metin Toy						
16	Burak Mert						
17	Doğukan Ulu						
53	Volkan Döne						

== Pool D ==
=== Czech Republic ===
The following is the Czech roster in the 2019 European Championship.

- Head Coach: Michal Nekola

No.	Name	Date of birth	Height	Weight	Spike	Block	2019 club
1	Milan Moník						
2	Jan Hadrava						
4	Donovan Džavoronok						
5	Adam Zajíček						
6	Michal Finger						
8	Tomáš Kunc						
9	Vojtěch Patočka						
10	Pavel Bartoš						
13	Jan Galabov						
14	Adam Bartoš						
15	Vladimír Sobotka						
17	David Janků						
18	Jakub Janouch						
22	Oliver Sedláček						

=== Estonia ===
The following is the Estonian roster in the 2019 European Championship.

- Head Coach: Gheorghe Creţu

No.	Name	Date of birth	Height	Weight	Spike	Block	2019 Club
4	Ardo Kreek	7 August 1986	2.03 m (6 ft 8 in)	100 kg (220 lb)	355 cm (140 in)	331 cm (130 in)	(France) Paris Volley
5	Kert Toobal (C)	3 June 1979	1.89 m (6 ft 2 in)	78 kg (172 lb)	345 cm (136 in)	325 cm (128 in)	(Estonia) Bigbank Tartu
6	Martti Juhkami	6 June 1988	1.95 m (6 ft 5 in)	91 kg (201 lb)	352 cm (139 in)	325 cm (128 in)	(Germany) VfB Friedrichshafen
7	Renee Teppan	26 September 1993	1.97 m (6 ft 6 in)	89 kg (196 lb)	352 cm (139 in)	337 cm (133 in)	(France) Stade Poitevin Poitiers
9	Robert Täht	15 August 1993	1.91 m (6 ft 3 in)	84 kg (185 lb)	351 cm (138 in)	334 cm (131 in)	(Italy) Sir Safety Umbria Volley
10	Silver Maar (L)	11 February 1999	1.85 m (6 ft 1 in)	74 kg (163 lb)	305 cm (120 in)	295 cm (116 in)	(Estonia) Pärnu
12	Kristo Kollo	17 January 1990	1.90 m (6 ft 3 in)	89 kg (196 lb)	330 cm (130 in)	320 cm (130 in)	(Romania) CS Arcada Galați
14	Rait Rikberg (L)	30 August 1982	1.74 m (5 ft 9 in)	79 kg (174 lb)	307 cm (121 in)	290 cm (110 in)	(Estonia) Bigbank Tartu
15	Andrus Raadik	19 October 1986	1.99 m (6 ft 6 in)	100 kg (220 lb)	330 cm (130 in)	303 cm (119 in)	Unattached
17	Timo Tammemaa	18 November 1991	2.02 m (6 ft 8 in)	93 kg (205 lb)	363 cm (143 in)	343 cm (135 in)	(France) Tours VB
18	Rauno Tamme	7 April 1992	1.88 m (6 ft 2 in)	93 kg (205 lb)	363 cm (143 in)	343 cm (135 in)	(Estonia) Saaremaa
19	Andri Aganits	7 September 1993	2.07 m (6 ft 9 in)	81 kg (179 lb)	343 cm (135 in)	320 cm (130 in)	(Belgium) Noliko Maaseik
22	Markkus Keel	18 August 1995	1.91 m (6 ft 3 in)	86 kg (190 lb)	327 cm (129 in)	320 cm (130 in)	(Belgium) Lindemans Aalst
23	Hindrek Pulk	7 November 1990	1.94 m (6 ft 4 in)	87 kg (192 lb)	350 cm (140 in)	330 cm (130 in)	(France) Chaumont Volley-Ball 52

=== Montenegro ===
The following is the Montenegrin roster in the 2019 European Championship.

- Head Coach: (Bosnia and Herzegovina) Veljko Basić

No.	Name	Date of birth	Height	Weight	Spike	Block	2019 club
1	Aleksandar Minić						
3	Luka Babić						
4	Gojko Ćuk						
5	Rajko Strugar						
6	Vojin Ćaćić						
7	Nikola Radonić						
8	Nikola Lakčević						
9	Marko Bojić						
11	Božidar Ćuk						
13	Blažo Milić						
16	Marko Vukašinović						
17	Ivan Ječmenica						
18	Miloš Ćulafić						
19	Nemanja Peruničić						

=== Poland ===
The following is the Polish roster in the 2019 European Championship.

- Head Coach: (Belgium) Vital Heynen

No.	Name	Date of birth	Height	Weight	Spike	Block	2019 club
1	Piotr Nowakowski						
2	Maciej Muzaj						
3	Dawid Konarski						
4	Marcin Komenda						
7	Artur Szalpuk						
9	Wilfredo León						
10	Damian Wojtaszek						
11	Fabian Drzyzga						
13	Michał Kubiak						
14	Aleksander Śliwka						
15	Jakub Kochanowski						
17	Paweł Zatorski						
20	Mateusz Bieniek						
77	Karol Kłos						

=== Netherlands ===
The following is the Dutch roster in the 2019 European Championship.

- Head Coach: (Italy) Roberto Piazza

No.	Name	Date of birth	Height	Weight	Spike	Block	2019 club
2	Wessel Keemink						
3	Maarten Van Garderen						
4	Thijs ter Horst						
5	Luuc Van Der Ent						
6	Just Dronkers						
7	Gijs Jorna						
8	Fabian Plak						
9	Ewoud Gommans						
10	Sjoerd Hoogendoorn						
14	Nimir Abdel-Aziz						
15	Gijs van Solkema						
16	Wouter ter Maat						
17	Michaël Parkinson						
18	Robbert Andringa						

=== Ukraine ===
The following is the Ukrainian roster in the 2019 European Championship.

- Head Coach: Uģis Krastiņš

No.	Name	Date of birth	Height	Weight	Spike	Block	Club
1	Timofii Poluian	10 January 1998	1.98 m (6 ft 6 in)	88 kg (194 lb)	320 cm (130 in)	330 cm (130 in)	(Slovenia) ACH Volley
3	Dmytro Viietskyi	19 February 1998	2.01 m (6 ft 7 in)	91 kg (201 lb)	320 cm (130 in)	310 cm (120 in)	(Serbia) Vojvodina
5	Oleh Plotnytskyi (C)	5 June 1997	1.95 m (6 ft 5 in)	97 kg (214 lb)	320 cm (130 in)	300 cm (120 in)	(Italy) Perugia
6	Maksym Drozd	5 August 1991	2.08 m (6 ft 10 in)	93 kg (205 lb)	328 cm (129 in)	320 cm (130 in)	(France) Tourcoing Lille Métropole Volley-Ball
7	Horden Brova	8 April 1991	1.90 m (6 ft 3 in)	80 kg (180 lb)	330 cm (130 in)	320 cm (130 in)	(Ukraine) Barkom Kazhany
8	Dmytro Teryomenko	1 February 1987	1.99 m (6 ft 6 in)	90 kg (200 lb)	320 cm (130 in)	325 cm (128 in)	(France) Tours VB
9	Volodymyr Kovalchuk	22 April 1984	1.95 m (6 ft 5 in)	95 kg (209 lb)	320 cm (130 in)	325 cm (128 in)	(Israel) Hapoel Yoav KFAR SABA
10	Yurii Semeniuk	12 May 1994	2.10 m (6 ft 11 in)	106 kg (234 lb)	330 cm (130 in)	325 cm (128 in)	(Belgium) Noliko Maaseik
11	Vladyslav Didenko	29 September 1992	1.90 m (6 ft 3 in)	80 kg (180 lb)	300 cm (120 in)	305 cm (120 in)	Free agent
12	Denys Fomin	21 July 1986	1.77 m (5 ft 10 in)	72 kg (159 lb)	352 cm (139 in)	325 cm (128 in)	(Ukraine) Sertse Podillia
16	Oleh Shevchenko	8 January 1993	1.95 m (6 ft 5 in)	90 kg (200 lb)	320 cm (130 in)	320 cm (130 in)	(Ukraine) Barkom Kazhany
17	Yuriy Tomyn	23 December 1988	1.98 m (6 ft 6 in)	100 kg (220 lb)	320 cm (130 in)	320 cm (130 in)	(Ukraine) Barkom Kazhany
18	Ian Iereshchenko	6 April 1990	1.97 m (6 ft 6 in)	82 kg (181 lb)	310 cm (120 in)	320 cm (130 in)	(Russia) VC Yenisey Krasnoyarsk
20	Oleksandr Hladenko	12 March 1991	2.03 m (6 ft 8 in)	96 kg (212 lb)	350 cm (140 in)	330 cm (130 in)	(Ukraine) Barkom Kazhany

== See also ==
- 2019 Women's European Volleyball Championship squads
