= Bartoš =

Bartoš (feminine: Bartošová) is a Czech and Slovak surname, derived from the Czech given name Bartoloměj and Slovak given name Bartolomej (variants of Bartholomew). Notable people with the surname include:

- Adrian Bartos, known as DJ Stretch Armstrong (born 1969), American DJ
- Adam Bartoš (born 1992), Czech volleyball player
- Alena Bartošová (born 1944), Czech cross-country skier
- Antonín Bartoš (1910–1998), Czech soldier
- Armand Phillip Bartos (1910–2005), American architect
- Břetislav Bartoš (1893–1926), Czech painter
- František Bartoš (folklorist) (1837–1906), Czech folklorist
- František Bartoš (motorcyclist) (1926–1987), Czech motorcycle racer
- Ivan Bartoš (born 1980), Czech politician
- Ivan Bartoš (footballer) (born 1977), Slovak footballer
- Iveta Bartošová (1966–2014), Czech singer
- Jan Zdeněk Bartoš (1908–1981), Czech composer
- Jindřich Bartoš (1911–1941), Czech fighter pilot
- Karl Bartos (born 1952), German musician
- Marek Bartoš (born 1996), Slovak footballer
- Pavel Bartoš (born 1994), Czech volleyball player
- Peter Bartoš (born 1973), Slovak ice hockey player
- Richard Bartoš (born 1992), Slovak footballer

== See also ==
- Bartosz
