= Gommans =

Gommans is a Norwegian surname. Notable people with the surname include:

- Ewoud Gommans (born 1990), Dutch male volleyball player
- Harrie Gommans (born 1983), Dutch former professional footballer
- Jos Gommans (born 1963), Dutch historian and professor
- Sander Gommans (born 1978), Dutch musician and songwriter
