= Pavel Bartos =

Pavel Bartos may refer to:

- Pavel Bartoș (born 1975), Romanian actor and television presenter
- Pavel Bartoš (born 1994), Czech volleyball player
