= Michal Kriško =

Czech volleyball player (born 1988)

Michal Krisko

Personal information
- Nationality: Czech
- Born: 23 November 1988 (age 37)
- Height: 200 cm (6 ft 7 in)
- Weight: 93 kg (205 lb)
- Spike: 356 cm (140 in)
- Block: 330 cm (130 in)

Volleyball information
- Number: 18 (national team)

Career
Years	Teams
2015	VK Ceske Budejovice

National team
2015	Czech Republic

Michal Krisko (born 23 November 1988) is a Czech male volleyball player. He is part of the Czech Republic men's national volleyball team. On club level he plays for VK Ceske Budejovice.
