= Edin Ibrahimovic =

Austrian volleyball player (born 1998)

Personal information
- Nationality: Austrian
- Born: 11 July 1998 (age 28); Brčko
- Height: 6 ft 4 in (1.92 m)
- Weight: 172 lb (78 kg)
- Spike: 130 in (320 cm)
- Block: 110 in (290 cm)

Volleyball information
- Position: Outside spiker
- Current club: (United States) Menlo College

Career
Years	Teams
2016-2017; 2017-2018; 2018-	(Austria) VCA Niederösterreich (Austria) Posojilnica AICH/DOB (United States) Menlo College

Edin Ibrahimovic (born 11 July 1998) is an Austrian volleyball player, a member of the club Menlo College.

== Sporting achievements ==
=== Clubs ===
MEVZA:

- 2018

Austrian Championship:

- 2018
