= Yosvani González =

Cuban volleyball player (born 1988)

Yosvani González Nicolás
Personal information
- Nationality: Cuban
- Born: 18 April 1988 (age 38)
- Height: 196 cm (6 ft 5 in)
- Weight: 85 kg (187 lb)
- Spike: 345 cm (136 in)
- Block: 330 cm (130 in)

Volleyball information
- Number: 1 (national team)

Career
- Years: Team
- 2018: Surabaya Bhayangkara Samator

National team
- Years: Team
- 2015: Cuba

Yosvani González Nicolás (born 18 April 1988) is a Cuban male volleyball player. He is part of the Cuba men's national volleyball team. On club level he plays for Surabaya Bhayangkara Samator.
