= Pieter Coolman =

Belgian volleyball player (born 1989)

Personal information
- Nationality: Belgian
- Born: 24 April 1989 (age 37); Bruges
- Hometown: Bruges
- Height: 6 ft 7 in (200 cm)
- Weight: 205 lb (93 kg)
- Spike: 137 in (348 cm)
- Block: 131 in (332 cm)

Volleyball information
- Position: Middle blocker
- Current club: (Belgium) Knack Randstad Roeselare
- Number: 5

Career
Years	Teams
2010-2012; 2012-	(Belgium) Prefaxis Menen (Belgium) Knack Randstad Roeselare

National team
Belgium
Medal record
European League
Gold medal – first place	2013 Turkey

Pieter Coolman (born 24 April 1989) is a Belgian professional volleyball player, a member of the Belgium men's national volleyball team, and club Knack Randstad Roeselare. A gold medalist of the 2013 European League.

His younger sister Nina Coolman, who is also a volleyball player, is a member of VC Oudegem.

== Sporting achievements ==
=== Clubs ===
Belgian Cup:

- 2013, 2016, 2017, 2018

Belgium Championship:

- 2013, 2014, 2015, 2016, 2017
- 2018

Belgian SuperCup:

- 2013, 2014

=== National team ===
European League:

- 2013
