= Brian Negron =

Puerto Rican volleyball player (born 1996)

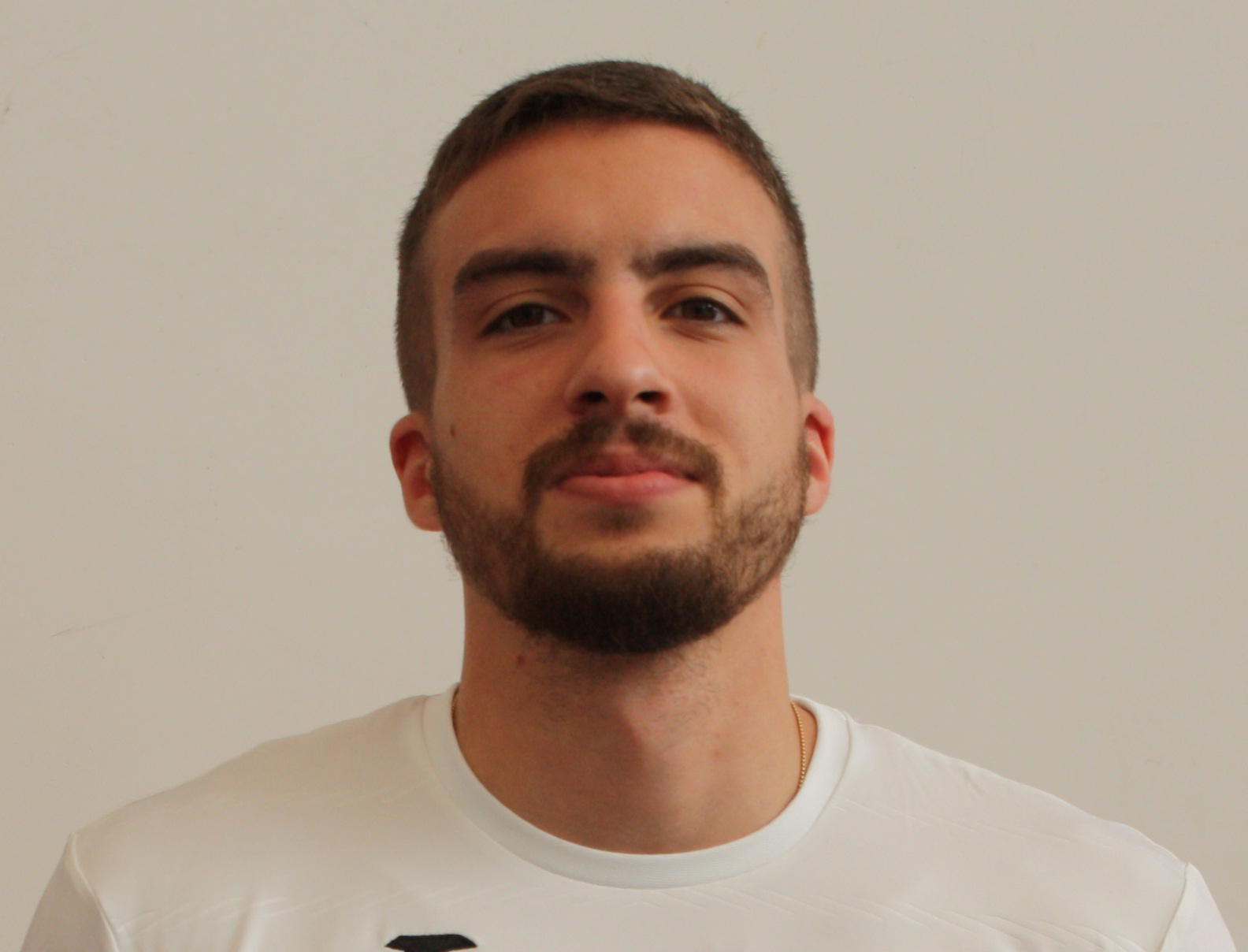

Personal information
- Nickname: RicanFlava
- Nationality: Puerto Rican
- Born: 15 February 1996 (age 30)
- Hometown: Bayamón, Puerto Rico
- Height: 199 cm (6 ft 6 in)
- Weight: 88 kg (194 lb)
- Spike: 302 cm (119 in)
- Block: 297 cm (117 in)
- Education: George Mason University

Volleyball information
- Position: Setter
- Number: 22 (national team); 14 (college)

National team
2014	Puerto Rico

Brian Negron (born 15 February 1996) is a Puerto Rican male volleyball player. He was part of the Puerto Rico men's national volleyball team. He is a setter.

== College ==
Negron played volleyball at George Mason University in Fairfax, Virginia. In 2016, he helped guide the Patriots to their first NCAA Tournament appearance since 1988. In 2018, he was named the EIVA Player of the Year.
