= Joni Savimäki =

Finnish volleyball player (born 1991)

Personal information
- Nationality: Finnish
- Born: 28 January 1991 (age 35)
- Height: 191 cm (6 ft 3 in)
- Weight: 88 kg (194 lb)
- Spike: 349 cm (137 in)
- Block: 320 cm (126 in)

Volleyball information
- Number: 22 (national team)

Career
Years	Teams
2014	Liiga-Riento

National team
2014	Finland

Joni Savimäki (born 28 January 1991) is a Finnish former volleyball player. He was part of the Finland men's national volleyball team. On club level he played for Liiga-Riento.
