= Jordan Richards (volleyball) =

Australian volleyball player (born 1993)

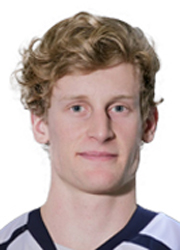

Personal information
- Nationality: Australian
- Born: 25 September 1993 (age 33)
- Height: 190 cm (6 ft 3 in)
- Weight: 89 kg (196 lb)
- Spike: 354 cm (139 in)
- Block: 342 cm (135 in)

Volleyball information
- Number: 24 (national team)

Career
| Years | Teams |
|---|---|
| 2015 | TV Schonenwerd |

National team
| 2015 | Australia |

Jordan Richards (born 25 September 1993) is an Australian male volleyball player. He is part of the Australia men's national volleyball team. On club level he plays for Sporting Clube de Portugal.
