= Gerard Osorio =

Spanish volleyball player (born 1993)

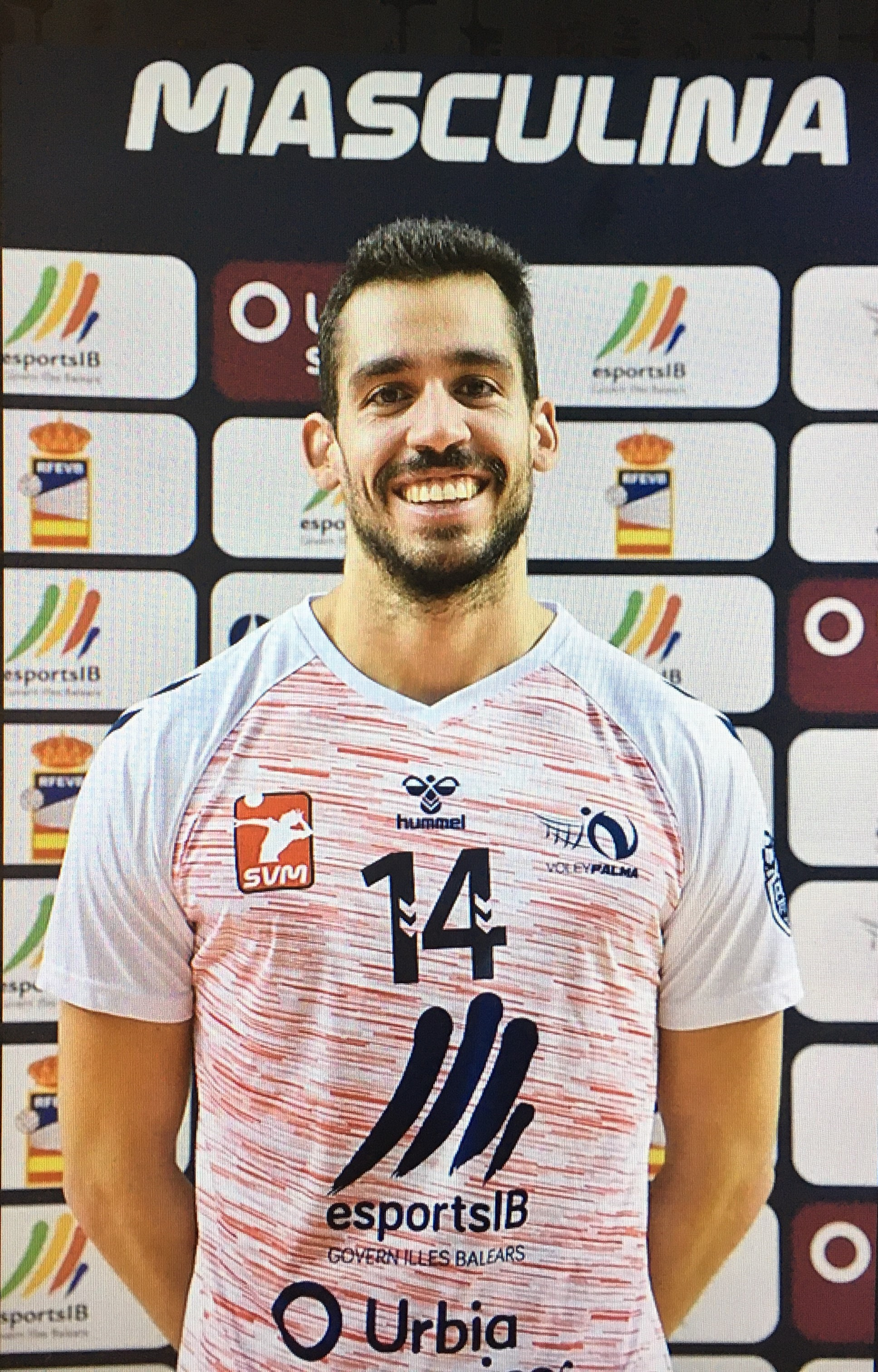

Personal information
- Full name: Gerar Osorio Recordà
- Nickname: selatrepitja
- Nationality: Spanish
- Born: 29 March 1993 (age 33); Sant Cugat del Vallès, Catalonia
- Hometown: Sabadell
- Height: 200 cm (6 ft 7 in)
- Weight: 95 kg (209 lb)
- Spike: 350 cm (138 in)
- Block: 331 cm (130 in)

Volleyball information
- Position: Opposite spiker / Botlane or Support
- Current club: Urbia Voley Palma
- Number: 12 and 14(national team)

Career
Years	Teams
2010-11; 2011-12; 2013–14; 2014-15; 2015-16; 2016-17; 2017-18; 2018-19; 2019-20	CyL Palencia; CyL Palencia; CyL Palencia; ASUL Lyon Volley-Ball; ASUL Lyon Volley-Ball; Ushuaïa Ibiza Voley; Río Duero Soria; Urbia Voley Palma; Urbia Voley Palma

National team
2015	Spain

Gerard Osorio (born March 29, 1993) is a Spanish male volleyball player. He is part of the Spain men's national volleyball team. He plays currently for Urbia Voley Palma.
