= Lowie Stuer =

Belgian volleyball player (born 1995)

Personal information
- Nationality: (Belgium) Belgian
- Born: 24 November 1995 (age 30)
- Height: 1.94 m (6 ft 4 in)
- Weight: 80 kg (176 lb)
- Spike: 331 cm (130 in)
- Block: 310 cm (122 in)

Volleyball information
- Position: Libero
- Current club: (Belgium) Volley Menen
- Number: 1

Career
Years	Teams
2013–2014; 2014–2015; 2015–2018; 2018–2019; 2019–2020; 2020–	(Belgium) Knack Roeselare (Belgium) Topvolley Antwerpen (Belgium) Volley Gent (Belgium) Volley Menen (France) Arago de Sète (Belgium) Volley Menen

National team
Belgium

Lowie Stuer (born 24 November 1995) is a Belgian volleyball player, member of the Belgium men's national volleyball team. Stuer competed for Belgium at the 2014 World Championship held in Poland.

In September 2017 he was named the best libero in the European Championship in Poland, where his team (the Red Dragons) ended 4th place. For the season 2018-2019 Lowie will be playing for Par-Ky Menen, a solid top 4 club in the Belgian Liga A. And he was selected by Andrea Anastasi to play as libero with the Belgian Red Dragons at the World Championship in Italy/Bulgaria (sept 2018). With Par-Ky Menen, Lowie played libero and in the play-offs, his team ended 4th in the Championship. During summer, he will be joining the national team for the European Championship and the qualifying round for the Olympic Games in Japan. For the season 2019-2020 he played for Sète (http://www.aragodesete.fr). Next season he will be playing for VC Menen (2nd tour of duty) and the national team.

== Sporting achievements ==
=== Clubs ===
- National championships
  - 2013/2014 Belgian SuperCup, with Knack Roeselare
  - 2013/2014 Belgian Championship, with Knack Roeselare

=== Youth national team ===
- 2012 CEV U20 European Championship
- 2013 CEV U19 European Championship

=== Individual awards ===
- 2017: CEV European Championship – Best Libero
