= Karel Linz =

Czech volleyball player (born 1986)

Personal information
- Nationality: Czech
- Born: 20 April 1986 (age 40)
- Hometown: Chomutov
- Height: 200 cm (6 ft 7 in)
- Weight: 92 kg (203 lb)
- Spike: 349 cm (137 in)
- Block: 331 cm (130 in)

Volleyball information
- Number: 6 (national team)

Career
| Years | Teams |
|---|---|
| 2015 | Rennes Volley |

National team
| 2015 | Czech Republic |

Karel Linz (born 20 April 1986) is a Czech male volleyball player. He is part of the Czech Republic men's national volleyball team. On club level he plays for Rennes Volley.
