= Carlos Jiménez (volleyball) =

Spanish volleyball player (born 1995)

Personal information
- Nationality: Spanish
- Born: 12 August 1995 (age 31)
- Height: 192 cm (6 ft 4 in)
- Weight: 65 kg (143 lb)
- Spike: 320 cm (126 in)
- Block: 309 cm (122 in)

Volleyball information
- Number: 20 (national team)

Career
Years	Teams
2015	CPJM CETD Palencia

National team
2015	Spain

Carlos Jiménez (born 12 August 1995) is a Spanish male volleyball player. He is part of the Spain men's national volleyball team. On club level he plays for CPJM CETD Palencia.
