= Petr Michálek =

Czech volleyball player (born 1989)

Petr Michalek

Personal information
- Nationality: Czech
- Born: 19 August 1989 (age 37)
- Height: 1.90 m (6 ft 3 in)
- Weight: 80 kg (176 lb)
- Spike: 344 cm (135 in)
- Block: 325 cm (128 in)

Volleyball information
- Position: Outside spiker
- Current club: Jihostroj České Budějovice
- Number: 7

Career
Years	Teams
2015–	Jihostroj České Budějovice

National team
2015–	Czech Republic

Petr Michalek (born 19 August 1989) is a Czech male volleyball player. He is part of the Czech Republic men's national volleyball team. On club level he plays for Jihostroj České Budějovice.
