= Antoni Llabres =

Spanish volleyball player (born 1991)

Personal information
- Nationality: Spanish
- Born: 20 November 1991 (age 34)
- Height: 189 cm (6 ft 2 in)
- Weight: 77 kg (170 lb)
- Spike: 330 cm (130 in)
- Block: 320 cm (126 in)

Volleyball information
- Number: 13 (national team)

Career
Years	Teams
2015	CV Unicaja Almería

National team
2015	Spain

Antoni Llabres (born 20 November 1991) is a Spanish male volleyball player. He is part of the Spain men's national volleyball team. On club level he plays for CV Unicaja Almería.
