= Matthias Valkiers =

Belgian volleyball player (born 1990)

Personal information
- Nationality: Belgian
- Born: 8 April 1990 (age 36); Aalst, Belgium
- Height: 1.94 m (6 ft 4 in)
- Weight: 92 kg (203 lb)
- Spike: 339 cm (133 in)
- Block: 310 cm (122 in)

Volleyball information
- Position: Setter
- Current club: BDO Haasrode Leuven

Career
| Years | Teams |
|---|---|
| 2009–2011; 2011–2014; 2014–2015; 2015–2016; 2016–2017; 2017–2018; 2018–2019; 2019–2021; 2021– | Lindemans Aalst; Noliko Maaseik; Palandöken Belediyesi; Prefaxis Menen; Remat Zalău; PAOK Thessaloniki; Tourcoing LM; United Volleys Frankfurt; BDO Haasrode Leuven |

National team
| 2014– | Belgium |

Matthias Valkiers (born 8 April 1990) is a Belgian male volleyball player. He was part of the Belgium men's national volleyball team at the 2014 FIVB Volleyball Men's World Championship in Poland.
