= Lubos Kostolani =

Slovak volleyball player (born 1990)

Personal information
- Nationality: Slovak
- Born: 28 November 1990 (age 35)
- Height: 203 cm (6 ft 8 in)
- Weight: 95 kg (209 lb)
- Spike: 352 cm (139 in)
- Block: 335 cm (132 in)

Volleyball information
- Number: 18 (national team)

Career
Years	Teams
2015	Tv Bühl

National team
2015	Slovakia

Lubos Kostolani (born 28 November 1990) is a Slovak male volleyball player. He is part of the Slovakia men's national volleyball team. On club level he plays for VKP Bratislava.
