= Arno Van De Velde =

Belgian volleyball player (born 1995)

Personal information
- Nationality: Belgian
- Born: 30 December 1995 (age 30); Aalst, Belgium
- Height: 2.10 m (6 ft 11 in)
- Weight: 94 kg (207 lb)
- Spike: 350 cm (138 in)
- Block: 340 cm (134 in)

Volleyball information
- Position: Middle blocker
- Current club: Volley Menen
- Number: 9

Career
Years	Teams
2012–2019; 2019–2020; 2020–2021; 2021–2022; 2022–	Knack Roeselare; Arago de Sète; VfB Friedrichshafen; Knack Roeselare; Volley Menen

National team
2015–	Belgium

Arno Van De Velde (born 30 December 1995) is a Belgian professional volleyball player. He is a member of the Belgium national team. At the professional club level, he plays for Volley Menen.

== Honours ==
=== Clubs ===
- National championships
  - 2012/2013 Belgian Cup, with Knack Roeselare
  - 2012/2013 Belgian Championship, with Knack Roeselare
  - 2013/2014 Belgian SuperCup, with Knack Roeselare
  - 2013/2014 Belgian Championship, with Knack Roeselare
  - 2014/2015 Belgian SuperCup, with Knack Roeselare
  - 2014/2015 Belgian Championship, with Knack Roeselare
  - 2015/2016 Belgian Cup, with Knack Roeselare
  - 2015/2016 Belgian Championship, with Knack Roeselare
  - 2016/2017 Belgian Cup, with Knack Roeselare
  - 2016/2017 Belgian Championship, with Knack Roeselare
  - 2017/2018 Belgian Cup, with Knack Roeselare
  - 2018/2019 Belgian SuperCup, with Knack Roeselare
  - 2018/2019 Belgian Cup, with Knack Roeselare
  - 2021/2022 Belgian Championship, with Knack Roeselare
