= Alexander Mcmullin =

Australian volleyball player (born 1995)

Personal information
- Nationality: Australian
- Born: 1 August 1995 (age 31)
- Height: 201 cm (6 ft 7 in)
- Weight: 76 kg (168 lb)
- Spike: 355 cm (140 in)
- Block: 340 cm (134 in)

Volleyball information
- Number: 20 (national team)

Career
Years	Teams
2015	University of Alberta

National team
2015	Australia

Alexander Mcmullin (born 1 August 1995) is an Australian male volleyball player. He is part of the Australia men's national volleyball team. On club level he plays for University of Alberta.
