= Antonio Corvetta =

Italian volleyball player (born 1977)

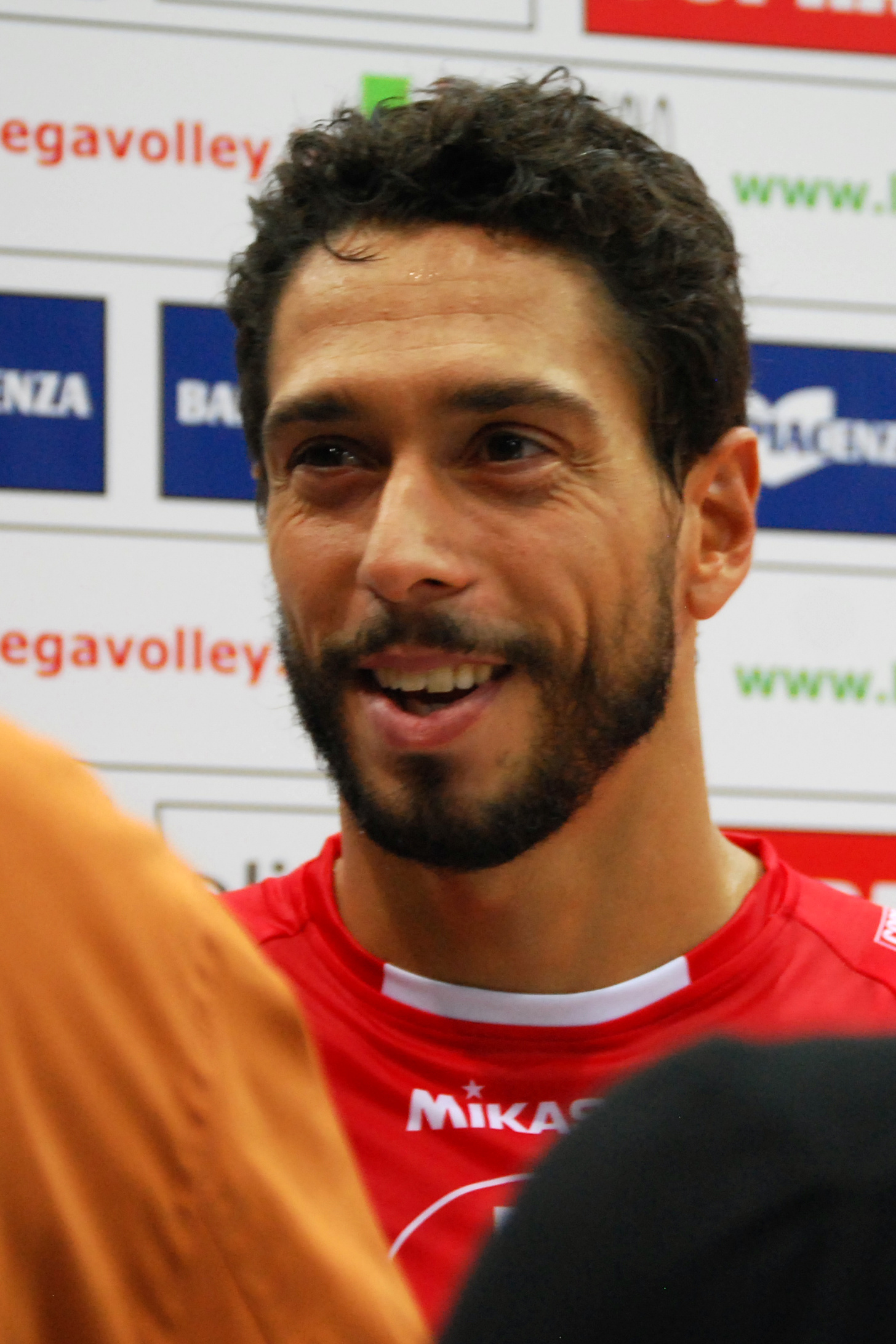

Personal information
- Nationality: Italian
- Born: 28 September 1977 (age 49)
- Height: 188 cm (6 ft 2 in)
- Weight: 82 kg (181 lb)
- Spike: 326 cm (128 in)
- Block: 242 cm (95 in)

Volleyball information
- Number: 5 (national team)

Career
Years	Teams
2014	Altotevere Città di Castello

National team
2014	Italy

Antonio Corvetta (born 28 September 1977) is a former Italian male volleyball player. He was part of the Italy men's national volleyball team. On club level he played for Altotevere Città di Castello.

== Sporting achievements ==
=== Clubs ===
==== CEV Champions League ====
- 2014/2015 - with Cucine Lube Civitanova
- 2016/2017 - with Cucine Lube Civitanova

==== National championships ====
- 2016/2017 Italian Championship, with Cucine Lube Civitanova
