= Marek Beer =

Czech volleyball player (born 1988)

Personal information
- Nationality: Czech
- Born: 24 May 1988 (age 38); Český Krumlov
- Height: 2.01 m (6 ft 7 in)
- Weight: 101 kg (223 lb)
- Spike: 354 cm (139 in)
- Block: 334 cm (131 in)

Volleyball information
- Position: Middle blocker
- Current club: VK ČEZ KARLOVARSKO
- Number: 1

National team
2015–2018	Czech Republic

Marek Beer (born 24 May 1988 in Český Krumlov) is a Czech male volleyball player. He was part of the Czech Republic men's national volleyball team. On club level he plays for SKV Ústí nad Labem. Before his engagement in SKV, he also played for ČEZ Karlovarsko, Alpen Volleys in German Bundesliga, HYPO Tirol Innsbruck in Austrian highest league, Dukla Liberec and SKV Ústí nad Labem in Czech extraliga.
