= Eemeli Kouki =

Finnish volleyball player (born 1991)

Personal information
- Nationality: Finnish
- Born: 26 October 1991 (age 35)
- Height: 194 cm (6 ft 4 in)
- Weight: 84 kg (185 lb)
- Spike: 340 cm (134 in)
- Block: 330 cm (130 in)

Volleyball information
- Number: 7 (national team)

Career
Years	Teams
2015	Hurrikaani-Loimaa

National team
2015	Finland

Eemeli Kouki (born 26 October 1991) is a Finnish male volleyball player. He is part of the Finland men's national volleyball team. On club level he plays for Hurrikaani-Loimaa.
