= Filip Habr =

Czech volleyball player (born 1988)

Personal information
- Nationality: Czech
- Born: 27 April 1988 (age 38)
- Height: 201 cm (6 ft 7 in)
- Weight: 92 kg (203 lb)
- Spike: 348 cm (137 in)
- Block: 335 cm (132 in)

Volleyball information
- Number: 8 (national team)

Career
| Years | Teams |
|---|---|
| 2015 | VK Ceske Budejovice |

National team
| 2015 | Czech Republic |

Filip Habr (born 27 April 1988) is a Czech male volleyball player. He is part of the Czech Republic men's national volleyball team. On club level he plays for VK Ceske Budejovice.
