= Tomáš Kriško =

Slovak volleyball player (born 1988)

Personal information
- Nationality: Slovak
- Born: 19 December 1988 (age 37) Liptovský Mikuláš, Czechoslovakia
- Height: 202 cm (6 ft 8 in)
- Weight: 98 kg (216 lb)
- Spike: 350 cm (138 in)
- Block: 328 cm (129 in)

Volleyball information
- Number: 2 (national team)

Career
- Years: Team
- 2018: UNTREF Voley

National team
- Years: Team
- 2015: Slovakia

Tomáš Kriško (born 19 December 1988) is a Slovak male volleyball player. He is part of the Slovakia men's national volleyball team. On club level he plays for UNTREF Voley.
