= Venelin Kadankov =

Bulgarian volleyball player (born 1987)

Personal information
- Nationality: Bulgarian
- Born: 31 August 1987 (age 39)
- Height: 200 cm (6 ft 7 in)
- Weight: 98 kg (216 lb)
- Spike: 360 cm (142 in)
- Block: 315 cm (124 in)

Volleyball information
- Number: 20 (national team)

Career
- Years: Team
- 2015 = 2015: Afyonkarahisar Genclik = Shahrdari arak

National team
- Years: Team
- 2015: Bulgaria

Venelin Kadankov (born 31 August 1987) is a Bulgarian male volleyball player. He is part of the Bulgaria men's national volleyball team. On club level he plays for Afyonkarahisar Genclik.
