= Marco Ferreira (volleyball) =

Portuguese volleyball player

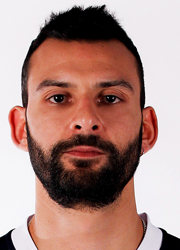

Personal information
- Full name: Marco Evan Ferreira
- Nationality: Portuguese
- Born: 4 October 1987 (age 39); Seia, Portugal
- Height: 2.03 m (6 ft 8 in)
- Weight: 97 kg (214 lb)
- Spike: 361 cm (142 in)
- Block: 347 cm (137 in)

Volleyball information
- Position: Opposite
- Number: 8

Career
| Years | Teams |
|---|---|
| 2004–2007; 2007–2008; 2008–2009; 2009–2011; 2011–2012; 2012–2013; 2013–2015; 2015–2016; 2016–2017; 2017; 2017–2018; 2018–2019; 2019–2020; 2020–2021; 2021; 2021–2022 | Benfica Lisboa; CS Marítimo; Fonte do Bastardo; CS Madeira; Orange Nassau; New Mater Volley; SC Espinho; Spacer's de Toulouse; SC Espinho; Emma Villas Volley; Ansan OK Savings Bank; SC Espinho; Al Rayyan SC; Al Jazira; SC Espinho; Gwardia Wrocław |

National team
| Portugal |
Honours
Men's volleyball
Representing Portugal
FIVB Challenger Cup
| Gold medal – first place | 2018 Matosinhos |
European League
| Gold medal – first place | 2010 Guadalajara |
| Bronze medal – third place | 2009 Portimão |

Marco Evan Ferreira (born 4 October 1987) is a Portuguese professional volleyball player. He is part of the Portuguese national team.

== Personal life ==
His younger brother, Alexandre is also a professional volleyball player.

== Honours ==
=== Clubs ===
- National championships
  - 2004/2005 Portuguese Cup, with Benfica Lisboa
  - 2004/2005 Portuguese Championship, with Benfica Lisboa
  - 2005/2006 Portuguese Cup, with Benfica Lisboa
  - 2006/2007 Portuguese Cup, with Benfica Lisboa
  - 2016/2017 Portuguese Cup, with SC Espinho
