= Baturalp Burak Güngör =

Turkish volleyball player (born 1993)

Baturalp Burak Gungor
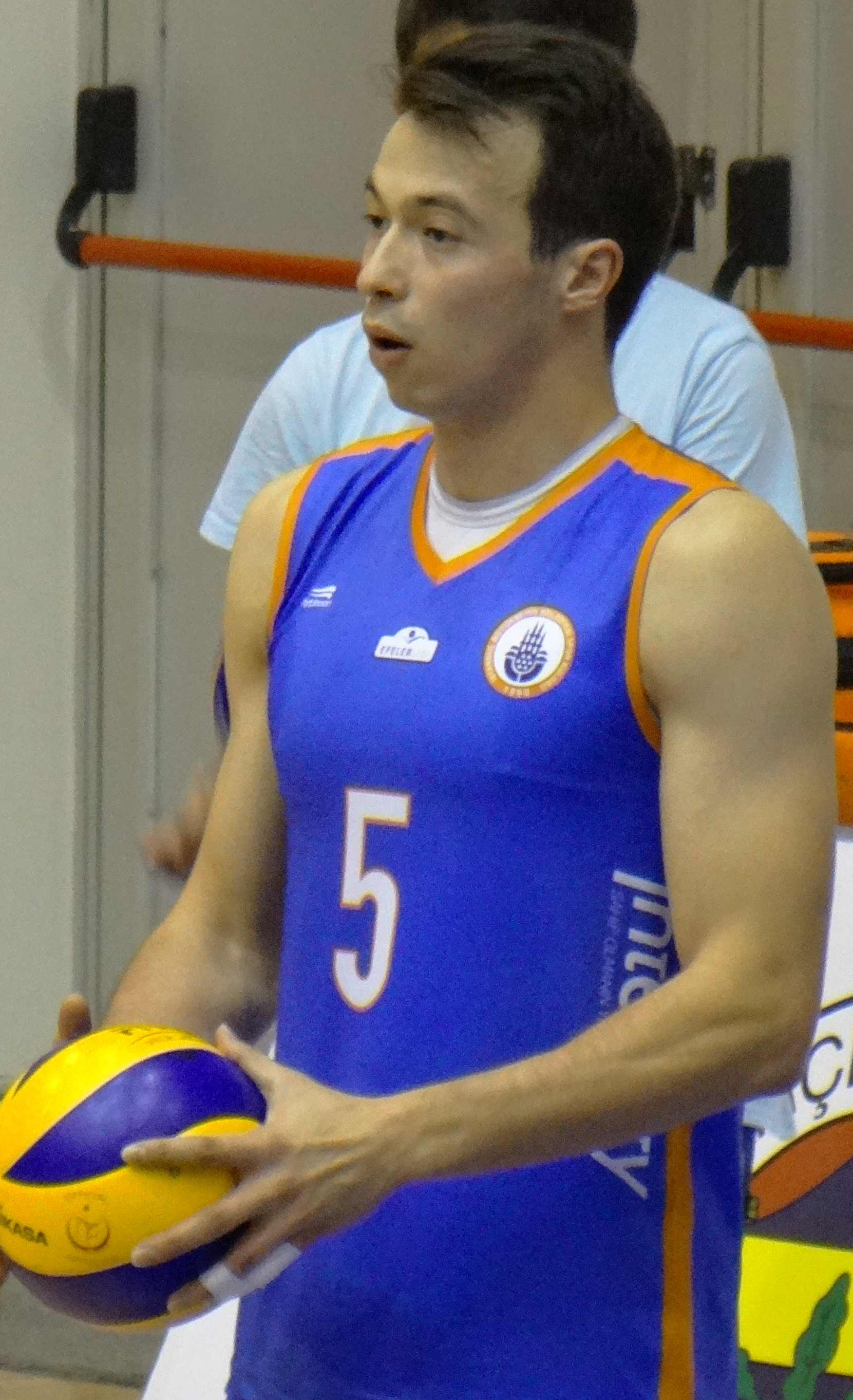

Personal information
- Nationality: Turkish
- Born: 28 July 1993 (age 33)
- Height: 1.90 m (6 ft 3 in)
- Weight: 84 kg (185 lb)
- Spike: 351 cm (138 in)
- Block: 338 cm (133 in)

Volleyball information
- Position: Outside hitter

Career
Years
- 2011–2017
- 2017–2019
- 2019–2021
- 2021–2022
- 2022–2024
- 2024–2025
Teams
- Ziraat Bankası Ankara
- İstanbul Büyükşehir Belediyespor
- Arkas Spor
- Spor Toto
- Galatasaray
- Fenerbahçe

National team
2015–	Turkey

Baturalp Burak Gungor (born 28 July 1993) is a Turkish male volleyball player. He plays as outside hitter for the Turkey men's national volleyball team.
