= Alejandro Vigil =

Spanish volleyball player (born 1993)

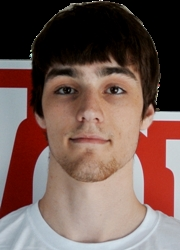
- Vigil in 2017

Personal information
- Full name: Alejandro Vigil González
- Nationality: Spanish
- Born: 11 February 1993 (age 33); Siero, Spain
- Height: 2.10 m (6 ft 11 in)
- Weight: 90 kg (198 lb)
- Spike: 338 cm (133 in)
- Block: 325 cm (128 in)

Volleyball information
- Position: Middle blocker
- Current club: Club Voleibol Leganés
- Number: 9

Career
| Years | Teams |
|---|---|
| 2009–2013; 2013–2015; 2015–2016; 2016–2017; 2017-2018; 2018-2020; 2020-2021; 2021-2022; 2022-2023; 2023-2024; 2024-2025; 2025-2026 | Palencia; Milano; Teruel; Noliko Maaseik; Sigma Aversa; Narbonne Volley; Costa Almería; Lindemans Aalst; Kemas Lamipel Santa Croce; SCM Zalau; Sporting CP; Club Voleibol Leganés |

National team
| Spain |
Honours
U19 World Championship
| Silver medal – second place | 2011 Argentina |

Alejandro Vigil González (born 11 February 1993) is a Spanish male volleyball player. He is part of the Spain men's national volleyball team. On club level he plays for Club Voleibol Leganés.
