= Todor Skrimov =

Bulgarian volleyball player (born 1990)

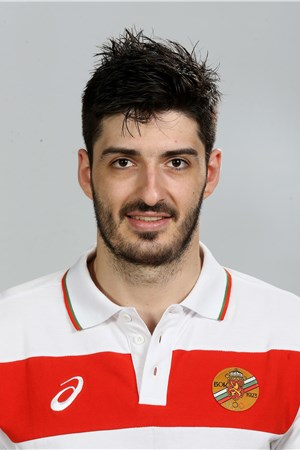

Personal information
- Nationality: Bulgarian
- Born: 9 January 1990 (age 36) Pernik, Bulgaria
- Height: 1.91 m (6 ft 3 in)
- Weight: 87 kg (192 lb)
- Spike: 348 cm (137 in)
- Block: 330 cm (130 in)

Volleyball information
- Position: Outside hitter
- Current club: Dynamo-LO
- Number: 7

Career
- Years: Team
- 2009–2013 2013–2015 2015–2017 2017–2018 2018–2019 2019–2023 2023–: Paris Volley; Top Volley Latina; Revivre Milano; NOVA Novokuybyshevsk; Volley Callipo; VC Yenisey Krasnoyarsk; VC Dynamo-LO

National team
- Years: Team
- 2011–2022: Bulgaria

Todor Skrimov (Bulgarian: Тодор Скримов; born 9 January 1990) is a Bulgarian professional volleyball player, a member of the Bulgaria national team, and a participant at the Olympic Games London 2012. At the professional club level, he plays for VC Dynamo-LO.

== Honours ==
=== Clubs ===
- CEV Challenge Cup
  - 2013/2014 – with Andreoli Latina
- National championships
  - 2012/2013 French Championship, with Paris Volley

=== Individual awards ===
- 2011: French Championship – Best Receiver
