= Samuli Kaislasalo =

Finnish volleyball player (born 1995)

Personal information
- Nationality: Finnish
- Born: 3 August 1995 (age 31)
- Height: 204 cm (6 ft 8 in)
- Weight: 88 kg (194 lb)
- Spike: 350 cm (138 in)
- Block: 325 cm (128 in)

Volleyball information
- Number: 20 (national team)

Career
Years	Teams
2015	Rantaperkiön Isku

National team
2015	Finland

Samuli Kaislasalo (born 3 August 1995) is a Finnish male volleyball player. He is part of the Finland men's national volleyball team. On the club level, he plays for Raision Loimu.
