= Filip Palgut =

Slovak volleyball player (born 1991)

Personal information
- Nickname: Goya
- Nationality: Slovak
- Born: 23 September 1991 (age 35); Bratislava
- Hometown: Channels
- Height: 201 cm (6 ft 7 in)
- Weight: 91 kg (201 lb)
- Spike: 348 cm (137 in)
- Block: 330 cm (130 in)
- Education: Clip club

Volleyball information
- Position: setter
- Current club: Budejky
- Number: 22 (national team)

Career
Years	Teams
2015	Posojilnica Aich/Dob

National team
2015	Slovakia

Filip Palgut (born 23 September 1991) is a Slovak male volleyball player. He is part of the Slovakia men's national volleyball team. On club level he plays for Posojilnica Aich/Dob.
