= Seppe Baetens =

Belgian volleyball player (born 1989)

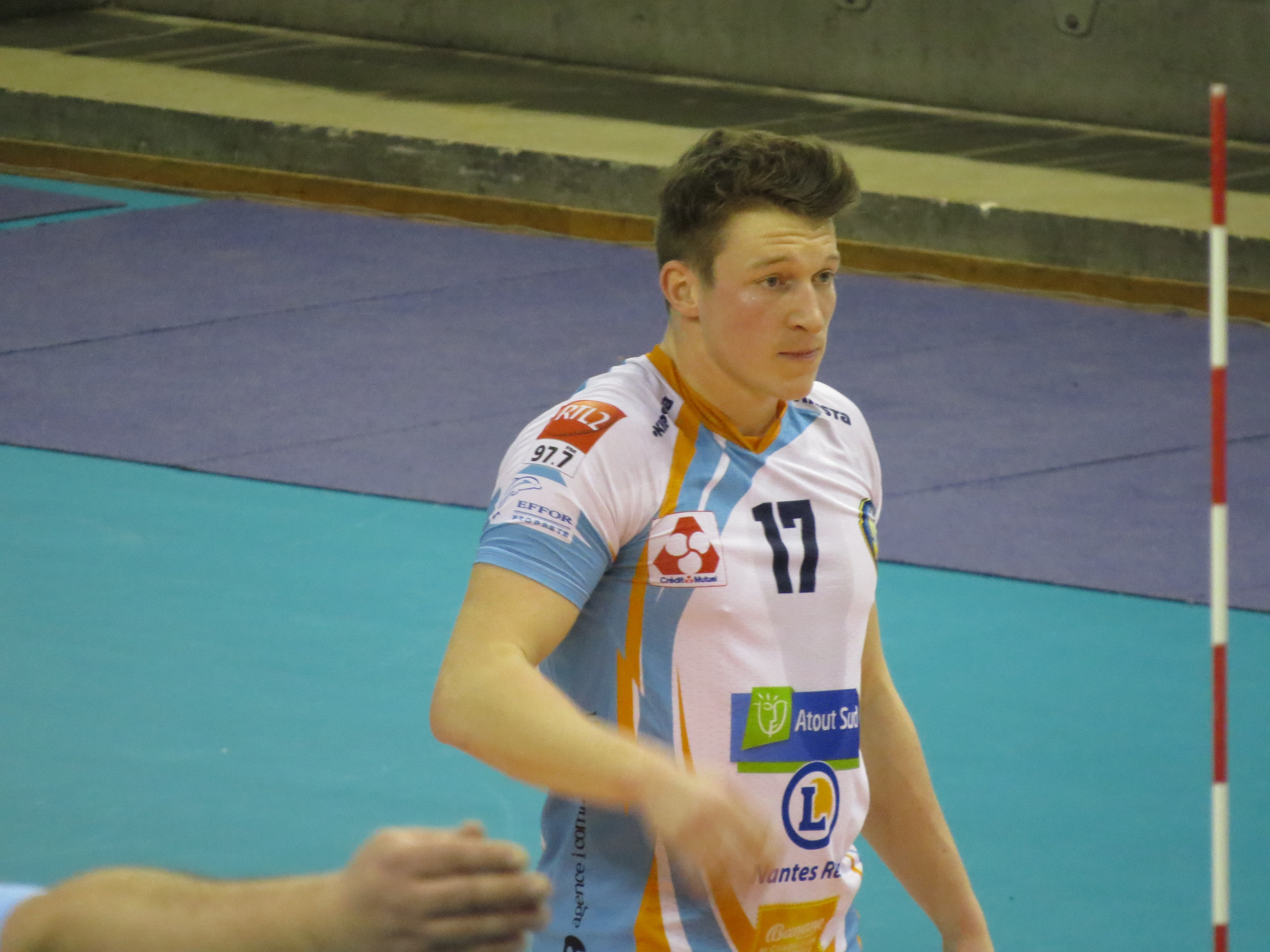

Personal information
- Nationality: Belgian
- Born: 13 February 1989 (age 37)
- Height: 191 cm (6 ft 3 in)
- Weight: 87 kg (192 lb)
- Spike: 349 cm (137 in)
- Block: 328 cm (129 in)

Volleyball information
- Position: Wing Spike
- Number: 18 (national team)

Career
Years	Teams
2015; 2016; 2017; 2020	Lindemans Aalst; Nantes Rezé Métropole Volley; Axis Shanks Guibertin; Haasrode Leuven

National team
2015	Belgium

Seppe Baetens (born 13 February 1989) is a Belgian male volleyball player. He is currently part of the Belgium men's national volleyball team. On club level he plays for Axis Shanks Guibertin.
