= Vladimír Sobotka (volleyball) =

Czech volleyball player (born 1985)

Vladimir Sobotka
Personal information
- Nationality: Czech
- Born: 7 May 1985 (age 41)
- Height: 203 cm (6 ft 8 in)
- Weight: 93 kg (205 lb)
- Spike: 350 cm (138 in)
- Block: 328 cm (129 in)

Volleyball information
- Number: 20 (national team)

Career
- Years: Team
- 2015: VK Ceske Budejovice

National team
- Years: Team
- 2015: Czech Republic

Vladimir Sobotka (born 7 May 1985) is a Czech male volleyball player. He is part of the Czech Republic men's national volleyball team. On club level he plays for VK Ceske Budejovice.
