= Mario Ferrera =

Spanish male volleyball player

Mario Ferrera García
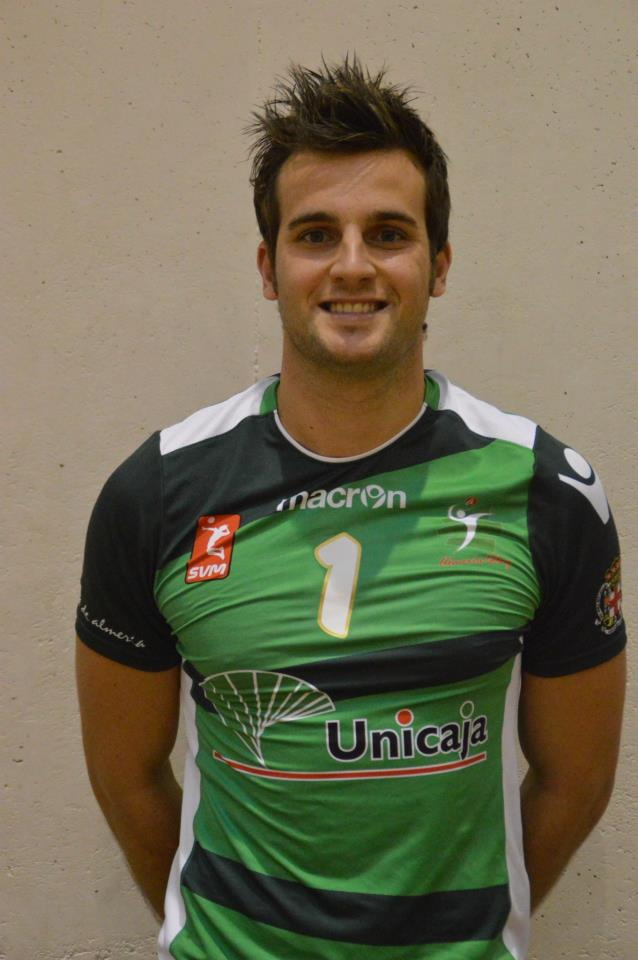
- Ferrera in 2013

Personal information
- Nationality: Spanish
- Born: 18 January 1987 (age 39)
- Height: 187 cm (6 ft 2 in)
- Weight: 85 kg (187 lb)
- Spike: 330 cm (130 in)
- Block: 310 cm (122 in)

Volleyball information
- Number: 21 (national team)

Career
Years	Teams
2015	Kifissia Atenas

National team
2015	Spain

Mario Ferrera García (born 18 January 1987) is a Spanish male volleyball player. He is part of the Spain men's national volleyball team. On club level he plays for Kifissia Atenas.
