= Tommi Siirilä =

Finnish volleyball player (born 1993)

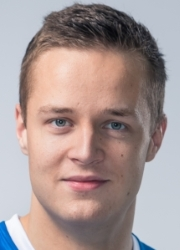

Personal information
- Nationality: Finnish
- Born: 5 August 1993 (age 33)
- Height: 2.02 m (6 ft 8 in)
- Weight: 102 kg (225 lb)
- Spike: 350 cm (138 in)
- Block: 325 cm (128 in)

Volleyball information
- Position: Middle blocker
- Current club: Perugia
- Number: 14

Career
- Years: Team
- Kokkolan Tiikerit; GFCO Ajaccio

National team
- Years: Team
- 2014–: Finland

Tommi Siirilä (born 5 August 1993) is a Finnish male volleyball player. He was part of the Finland men's national volleyball team at the 2014 FIVB Volleyball Men's World Championship in Poland. He played for Sir Conad Perugia.
