= Jorge Fernández Valcárcel =

Spanish volleyball player (born 1989)

Jorge Fernández
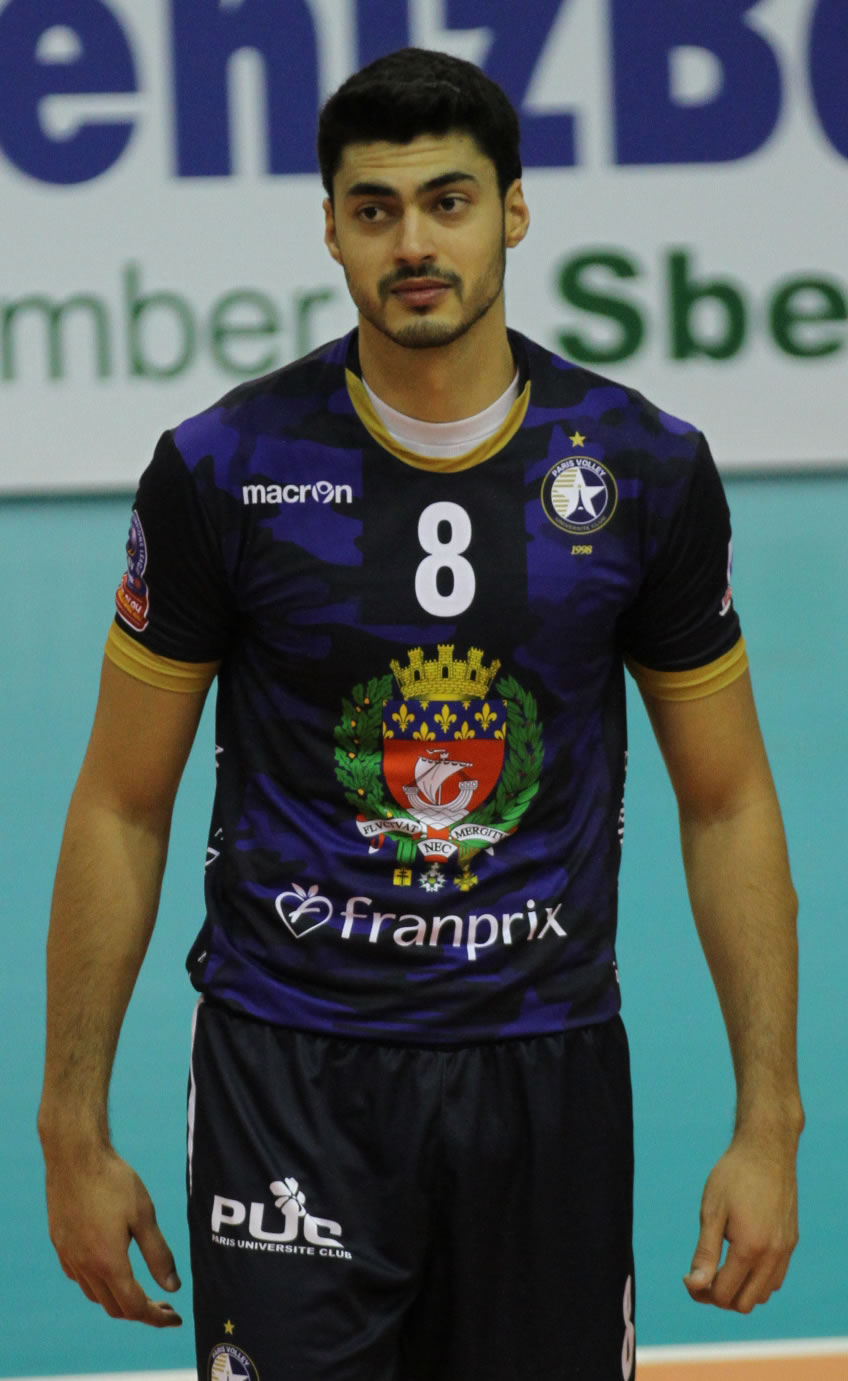

Personal information
- Full name: Jorge Fernández Valcárcel
- Nationality: Spanish
- Born: 4 May 1989 (age 37); O Barco de Valdeorras Ourense, Spain
- Height: 2.04 m (6 ft 8 in)
- Weight: 90 kg (198 lb)
- Spike: 346 cm (136 in)
- Block: 330 cm (130 in)

Volleyball information
- Position: Middle blocker First volley team= Ies Lauro olmo O barco
- Current club: Ca'n Ventura Palma
- Number: 10

Career
Years	Teams
2014–2016; 2016–	Paris Volley; Ca'n Ventura Palma

National team
2010–	Spain

Jorge Fernández Valcárcel (born 4 May 1989) is a Spanish male volleyball player. He was part of the Spain men's national volleyball team at the 2010 FIVB Volleyball Men's World Championship in Italy. He plays for Ca'n Ventura Palma.
