= Adam Bartoš =

Czech volleyball player (born 1992)

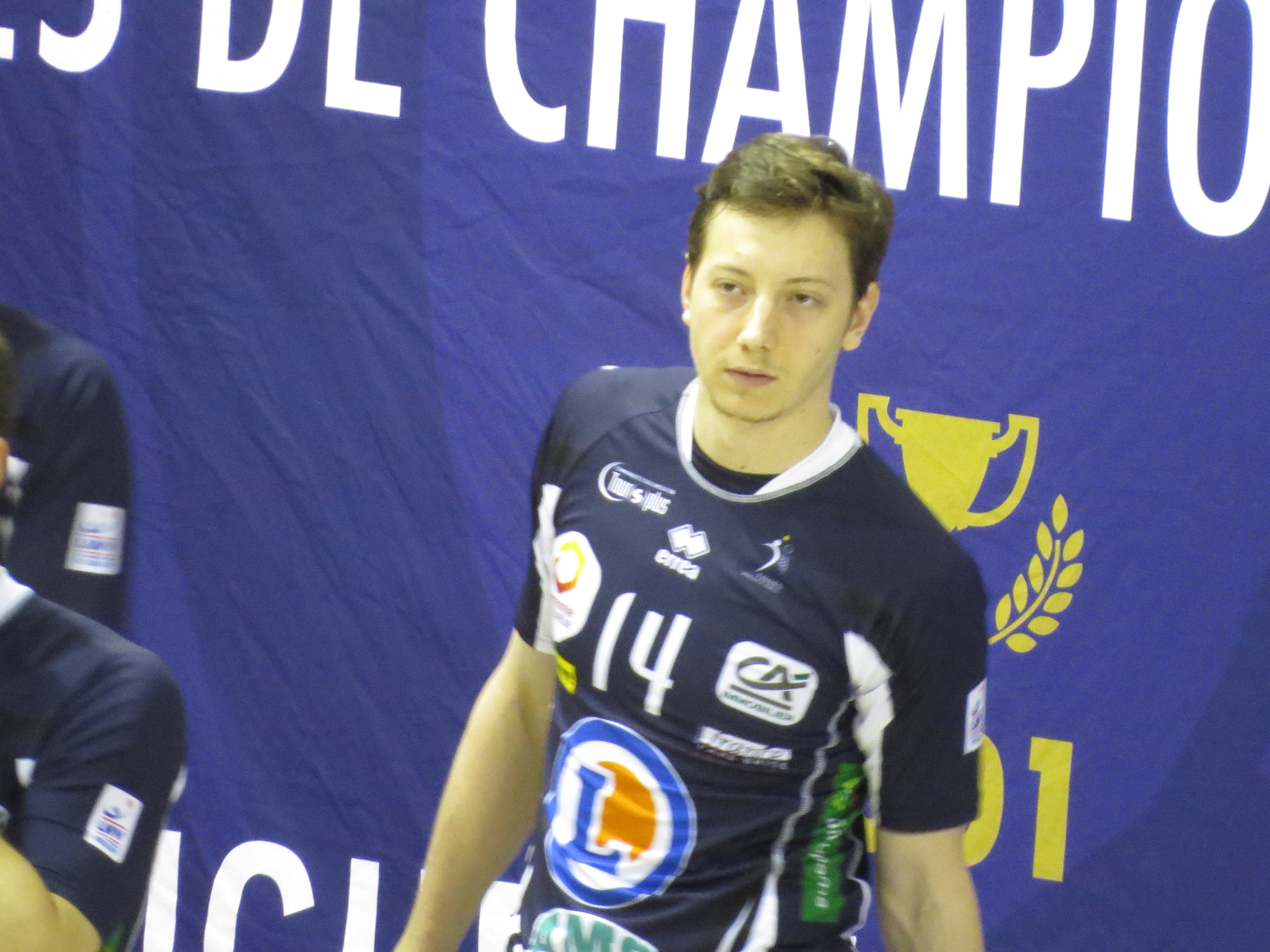

Personal information
- Nationality: Czech
- Born: 27 April 1992 (age 34); Zlín, Czechoslovakia
- Height: 198 cm (6 ft 6 in)
- Weight: 85 kg (187 lb)
- Spike: 350 cm (138 in)
- Block: 330 cm (130 in)

Volleyball information
- Number: 14 (national team)

Career
Years	Teams
2015	Tours VB

National team
2015-	Czech Republic

Adam Bartoš (born 27 April 1992) is a Czech male volleyball player. He is part of the Czech Republic men's national volleyball team. On club level he plays for Tours VB.
