= Ewoud Gommans =

Dutch volleyball player (born 1990)

Personal information
- Nationality: Dutch
- Born: 17 November 1990 (age 35); Voorschoten
- Height: 202 cm (6 ft 8 in)
- Weight: 89 kg (196 lb)
- Spike: 340 cm (134 in)
- Block: 320 cm (126 in)

Volleyball information
- Number: 9 (national team)

Career
Years	Teams
2015	(France) AS Cannes

National team
2013-	Netherlands

Ewoud Gommans (born 17 November 1990) is a Dutch male volleyball player. He is part of the Netherlands men's national volleyball team. On club level he plays for CS Dinamo in Bucharest, Romania.
