= Pavel Bartoš =

Czech volleyball player (born 1994)

Personal information
- Nationality: Czech
- Born: 20 April 1994 (age 32)
- Height: 191 cm (6 ft 3 in)
- Weight: 79 kg (174 lb)
- Spike: 335 cm (132 in)
- Block: 325 cm (128 in)

Volleyball information
- Number: 9 (national team)

Career
- Years: Team
- 2014: VSC Zlín

National team
- Years: Team
- 2014-: Czech Republic

Pavel Bartoš (born 20 April 1994) is a former Czech male volleyball player. He was part of the Czech Republic men's national volleyball team. On club level he played for VSC Zlín.
