= Volley Menen =

Belgian volleyball club

Decospan Volley Team Menen
- Founded: 1953
- Ground: Sporthal Vauban (Capacity: 750)
- Chairman: Pierre Vandeputte
- Manager: Frank Depestele
- League: Euro Millions Volley League
- 2021–22: 2nd place
- Website: Club home page

Uniforms
Home	Away

Volley Menen, officially known for sponsorship reasons as Decospan Volley Team Menen, is a professional men's volleyball club based in Menen which competes in the top flight of Belgian volleyball, Euro Millions Volley League.

== Achievements ==
- 2024 Belgian Super Cup winners.
