= 2017 Men's European Volleyball Championship squads =

This article shows all participating team squads at the 2017 Men's European Volleyball Championship, which will be held in Poland from 24 August – 3 September 2017.

== Belgium ==
The following is the Belgian roster in the 2017 Men's European Volleyball Championship.

Head coach:	Vital Heynen
Assistants:	Brecht Van Kerckhove, Steven Vanmedegael

No.	Name	Date of birth	Height	Weight	Spike	Block	2016/17 club
1	Bram Van Den Dries	14 August 1989	2.08 m (6 ft 10 in)	99 kg (218 lb)	361 cm (142 in)	325 cm (128 in)	(France) Spacer's de Toulouse
3	Sam Deroo (C)	29 April 1992	2.03 m (6 ft 8 in)	105 kg (231 lb)	355 cm (140 in)	335 cm (132 in)	(Poland) ZAKSA Kędzierzyn-Koźle
5	Ruben Van Hirtum	10 April 1990	1.94 m (6 ft 4 in)	88 kg (194 lb)	335 cm (132 in)	310 cm (120 in)	(Belgium) Knack Randstad Roeselare
6	Lowie Steuer	24 November 1995	1.94 m (6 ft 4 in)	80 kg (180 lb)	331 cm (130 in)	310 cm (120 in)	(Belgium) VDK Gent Dames
7	François Lecat	19 April 1993	2.00 m (6 ft 7 in)	96 kg (212 lb)	347 cm (137 in)	320 cm (130 in)	(Italy) Calzedonia Verona
8	Kevin Klinkenberg	4 October 1990	1.97 m (6 ft 6 in)	94 kg (207 lb)	343 cm (135 in)	314 cm (124 in)	(Italy) Top Volley Latina
9	Pieter Verhees	8 December 1989	2.05 m (6 ft 9 in)	112 kg (247 lb)	360 cm (140 in)	349 cm (137 in)	(Italy) Gi Group Monza
10	Simon Van De Voorde	19 December 1989	2.08 m (6 ft 10 in)	100 kg (220 lb)	365 cm (144 in)	350 cm (140 in)	(Italy) Diatec Trentino
12	Gert Van Walle	7 August 1987	1.97 m (6 ft 6 in)	91 kg (201 lb)	350 cm (140 in)	318 cm (125 in)	(Poland) GKS Katowice
14	Jelle Ribbens	17 March 1992	1.85 m (6 ft 1 in)	79 kg (174 lb)	331 cm (130 in)	300 cm (120 in)	(France) Nice Volley-Ball
15	Stijn D'Hulst	24 April 1991	1.87 m (6 ft 2 in)	75 kg (165 lb)	321 cm (126 in)	305 cm (120 in)	(Belgium) Knack Randstad Roeselare
16	Matthias Valkiers	8 April 1990	1.94 m (6 ft 4 in)	92 kg (203 lb)	339 cm (133 in)	310 cm (120 in)	(Romania) C.S. Remat Zalău
17	Tomas Rousseaux	31 March 1994	1.99 m (6 ft 6 in)	90 kg (200 lb)	352 cm (139 in)	317 cm (125 in)	(Germany) VfB Friedrichshafen
20	Arno Van De Velde	30 December 1995	2.10 m (6 ft 11 in)	93 kg (205 lb)	350 cm (140 in)	340 cm (130 in)	(Belgium) Knack Randstad Roeselare

== Bulgaria ==
The following is the Bulgarian roster in the 2017 Men's European Volleyball Championship.

Head coach:	Plamen Konstantinov
Assistants:	Alessandro Piroli, Daniel Peev

No.	Name	Date of birth	Height	Weight	Spike	Block	2016/17 club
1	Georgi Bratoev	21 October 1987	2.03 m (6 ft 8 in)	96 kg (212 lb)	340 cm (130 in)	325 cm (128 in)	(Bulgaria) Lukoil Neftohimik
5	Svetoslav Gotsev	31 August 1990	2.05 m (6 ft 9 in)	97 kg (214 lb)	358 cm (141 in)	335 cm (132 in)	(Italy) Biosì Indexa Sora
6	Rozalin Penchev	11 December 1994	1.97 m (6 ft 6 in)	79 kg (174 lb)	337 cm (133 in)	327 cm (129 in)	(Italy) Top Volley Latina
7	Velizar Chernokozhev	23 April 1995	2.08 m (6 ft 10 in)	97 kg (214 lb)	327 cm (129 in)	315 cm (124 in)	(Italy) Sir Sicoma Colussi Perugia
8	Todor Skrimov	9 January 1990	1.91 m (6 ft 3 in)	87 kg (192 lb)	348 cm (137 in)	330 cm (130 in)	(Italy) Revivre Milano
11	Georgi Seganov	10 June 1993	1.98 m (6 ft 6 in)	83 kg (183 lb)	355 cm (140 in)	325 cm (128 in)	(Italy) Biosì Indexa Sora
12	Viktor Yosifov (C)	16 October 1985	2.04 m (6 ft 8 in)	100 kg (220 lb)	350 cm (140 in)	340 cm (130 in)	(Italy) LPR Piacenza
13	Teodor Salparov	16 August 1982	1.87 m (6 ft 2 in)	77 kg (170 lb)	320 cm (130 in)	305 cm (120 in)	(Russia) Zenit Kazan
14	Teodor Todorov	1 September 1989	2.08 m (6 ft 10 in)	108 kg (238 lb)	365 cm (144 in)	345 cm (136 in)	(Russia) Gazprom-Ugra Surgut
15	Todor Aleksiev	21 April 1983	2.04 m (6 ft 8 in)	105 kg (231 lb)	355 cm (140 in)	340 cm (130 in)	(Argentina) Personal Bolivar
16	Vladislav Ivanov	14 March 1987	1.88 m (6 ft 2 in)	80 kg (180 lb)	320 cm (130 in)	310 cm (120 in)	(Bulgaria) Levski Sofia
17	Nikolay Penchev	22 May 1992	1.97 m (6 ft 6 in)	87 kg (192 lb)	341 cm (134 in)	335 cm (132 in)	(Poland) PGE Skra Bełchatów
18	Nikolay Nikolov	29 July 1986	2.06 m (6 ft 9 in)	97 kg (214 lb)	350 cm (140 in)	332 cm (131 in)	(Bulgaria) Lukoil Neftohimik
19	Tsvetan Sokolov	31 December 1989	2.06 m (6 ft 9 in)	100 kg (220 lb)	370 cm (150 in)	350 cm (140 in)	(Italy) Cucine Lube Civitanova

== Czech Republic ==
The following is the Czech roster in the 2017 Men's European Volleyball Championship.

Head coach:	Michal Nekola
Assistants:	Martin Demar

No.	Name	Date of birth	Height	Weight	Spike	Block	2016/17 club
2	Jan Hadrava	3 June 1991	1.98 m (6 ft 6 in)	101 kg (223 lb)	357 cm (141 in)	335 cm (132 in)	(Poland) Indykpol AZS Olsztyn
3	Marek Beer	24 May 1988	2.01 m (6 ft 7 in)	103 kg (227 lb)	350 cm (140 in)	335 cm (132 in)	(Austria) Hypo Tirol Innsbruck
4	Donovan Džavoronok	23 July 1997	2.02 m (6 ft 8 in)	85 kg (187 lb)	345 cm (136 in)	334 cm (131 in)	(Italy) Revivre Milano
6	Michal Finger	2 September 1993	2.02 m (6 ft 8 in)	92 kg (203 lb)	366 cm (144 in)	341 cm (134 in)	(Germany) VfB Friedrichshafen
7	Aleš Holubec (C)	13 March 1984	1.99 m (6 ft 6 in)	90 kg (200 lb)	357 cm (141 in)	335 cm (132 in)	(France) Nantes Rezé Métropole Volley
9	Marek Zmhral	10 August 1993	2.03 m (6 ft 8 in)	94 kg (207 lb)	357 cm (141 in)	337 cm (133 in)	(Czech Republic) Volejbal Brno
10	Matyáš Démar	1 October 1991	2.04 m (6 ft 8 in)	98 kg (216 lb)	340 cm (130 in)	330 cm (130 in)	(France) Nantes Rezé Métropole Volley
11	Martin Kryštof	11 October 1982	1.79 m (5 ft 10 in)	82 kg (181 lb)	347 cm (137 in)	328 cm (129 in)	(Czech Republic) Jihostroj České Budějovice
12	Daniel Pfeffer	27 April 1990	1.84 m (6 ft 0 in)	80 kg (180 lb)	331 cm (130 in)	320 cm (130 in)	(Czech Republic) VK Karlovarsko
13	Jan Galabov	12 June 1996	1.91 m (6 ft 3 in)	90 kg (200 lb)	354 cm (139 in)	320 cm (130 in)	(Czech Republic) VK Dukla Liberec
16	Radek Mach	28 September 1984	2.06 m (6 ft 9 in)	105 kg (231 lb)	344 cm (135 in)	333 cm (131 in)	
17	Adam Zajíček	25 February 1993	2.01 m (6 ft 7 in)	92 kg (203 lb)	345 cm (136 in)	331 cm (130 in)	(Czech Republic) VK Kladno
18	Jakub Janouch	13 June 1990	1.94 m (6 ft 4 in)	90 kg (200 lb)	336 cm (132 in)	320 cm (130 in)	(Czech Republic) VK Dukla Liberec
19	Petr Michálek	19 August 1989	1.90 m (6 ft 3 in)	80 kg (180 lb)	344 cm (135 in)	325 cm (128 in)	(Czech Republic) Jihostroj České Budějovice

== Estonia ==
The following is the Estonian roster in the 2017 Men's European Volleyball Championship.

Head coach:	Gheorghe Cretu
Assistants:	Rainer Vassiljev, Mirko Fasini

No.	Name	Date of birth	Height	Weight	Spike	Block	2016/17 club
1	Henri Treial	28 May 1992	2.02 m (6 ft 8 in)	97 kg (214 lb)	357 cm (141 in)	330 cm (130 in)	(Czech Republic) ČEZ Karlovarsko
4	Ardo Kreek	7 August 1986	2.03 m (6 ft 8 in)	100 kg (220 lb)	355 cm (140 in)	331 cm (130 in)	(France) Paris Volley
5	Kert Toobal (C)	3 June 1979	1.89 m (6 ft 2 in)	78 kg (172 lb)	345 cm (136 in)	325 cm (128 in)	(France) Rennes Volley 35
6	Oliver Orav	31 August 1995	1.92 m (6 ft 4 in)	76 kg (168 lb)	350 cm (140 in)	325 cm (128 in)	(Estonia) Selver Tallinn
7	Renee Teppan	26 September 1993	1.97 m (6 ft 6 in)	89 kg (196 lb)	340 cm (130 in)	322 cm (127 in)	(Austria) Hypo Tirol Innsbruck
9	Robert Täht	15 August 1993	1.91 m (6 ft 3 in)	84 kg (185 lb)	351 cm (138 in)	334 cm (131 in)	(Poland) Cuprum Lubin
10	Denis Losnikov	25 February 1994	1.96 m (6 ft 5 in)	87 kg (192 lb)	335 cm (132 in)	324 cm (128 in)	(Estonia) Selver Tallinn
11	Oliver Venno	23 May 1990	2.10 m (6 ft 11 in)	106 kg (234 lb)	355 cm (140 in)	331 cm (130 in)	(Turkey) Maliye Milli Piyango SK
12	Kristo Kollo	17 January 1990	1.90 m (6 ft 3 in)	89 kg (196 lb)	330 cm (130 in)	320 cm (130 in)	(Switzerland) TV Schönenwerd
13	Andres Toobal	27 August 1988	1.94 m (6 ft 4 in)	80 kg (180 lb)	345 cm (136 in)	325 cm (128 in)	(Belgium) Topvolley Precura Antwerpen
14	Rait Rikberg	30 August 1982	1.74 m (5 ft 9 in)	79 kg (174 lb)	307 cm (121 in)	290 cm (110 in)	(Estonia) BIGBANK Tartu
15	Andrus Raadik	19 October 1986	1.99 m (6 ft 6 in)	100 kg (220 lb)	345 cm (136 in)	330 cm (130 in)	(Finland) Pielaveden Sampo
17	Timo Tammemaa	18 November 1991	2.02 m (6 ft 8 in)	93 kg (205 lb)	363 cm (143 in)	343 cm (135 in)	(France) Spacer's de Toulouse
19	Andri Aganits	7 September 1993	2.07 m (6 ft 9 in)	100 kg (220 lb)	367 cm (144 in)	346 cm (136 in)	(France) Stade Poitevin Poitiers

== Finland ==
The following is the Finnish roster in the 2017 Men's European Volleyball Championship.

Head coach:	Tuomas Sammelvuo
Assistants:	Claudio Rifelli, Mikko Häyrinen, Jukka Sappinen

No.	Name	Date of birth	Height	Weight	Spike	Block	2016/17 club
1	Niko Haapakoski	1 May 1996	1.92 m (6 ft 4 in)	74 kg (163 lb)	325 cm (128 in)	312 cm (123 in)	(Finland) Lentopalloseura ETTA
2	Eemi Tervaportti	26 July 1989	1.93 m (6 ft 4 in)	80 kg (180 lb)	338 cm (133 in)	317 cm (125 in)	(France) Tours VB
4	Lauri Kerminen	18 January 1993	1.80 m (5 ft 11 in)	70 kg (150 lb)	325 cm (128 in)	290 cm (110 in)	(Russia) Kuzbass Kemerovo
5	Antti Siltala	14 March 1984	1.93 m (6 ft 4 in)	90 kg (200 lb)	347 cm (137 in)	320 cm (130 in)	(Turkey) Maliye Milli Piyango SK
6	Niklas Seppänen	30 June 1993	1.93 m (6 ft 4 in)	84 kg (185 lb)	335 cm (132 in)	320 cm (130 in)	(France) Tours VB
8	Elviss Krastins	15 September 1994	1.92 m (6 ft 4 in)	85 kg (187 lb)	335 cm (132 in)	315 cm (124 in)	(Belgium) Topvolley Precura Antwerpen
9	Tommi Siirilä	5 August 1993	2.03 m (6 ft 8 in)	102 kg (225 lb)	350 cm (140 in)	325 cm (128 in)	(France) GFCO Ajaccio
11	Sauli Sinkkonen	14 September 1989	2.01 m (6 ft 7 in)	94 kg (207 lb)	345 cm (136 in)	330 cm (130 in)	(Belgium) Topvolley Precura Antwerpen
12	Jan Helenius	13 October 1996	1.83 m (6 ft 0 in)	74 kg (163 lb)	320 cm (130 in)	300 cm (120 in)	(Finland) LEKA Volley
13	Antti Ropponen	17 August 1995	1.90 m (6 ft 3 in)	87 kg (192 lb)	340 cm (130 in)	318 cm (125 in)	(Finland) Kokkolan Tiikerit
14	Markus Kaurto	31 August 1993	1.96 m (6 ft 5 in)	85 kg (187 lb)	345 cm (136 in)	320 cm (130 in)	(Finland) Lentopalloseura ETTA
15	Henrik Porkka	14 January 1998	2.02 m (6 ft 8 in)	82 kg (181 lb)	360 cm (140 in)	330 cm (130 in)	(Finland) LEKA Volley
16	Olli-Pekka Ojansivu	31 December 1987	1.97 m (6 ft 6 in)	90 kg (200 lb)	344 cm (135 in)	325 cm (128 in)	(Russia) Kuzbass Kemerovo
19	Eetu Pennanen	18 September 1992	1.83 m (6 ft 0 in)	78 kg (172 lb)	335 cm (132 in)	315 cm (124 in)	

== France ==
The following is the French roster in the 2017 Men's European Volleyball Championship.

Head coach:	Laurent Tillie
Assistants:	Arnaud Josserand, Vincent Pichette

No.	Name	Date of birth	Height	Weight	Spike	Block	2016/17 club
2	Jenia Grebennikov	August 13, 1990	1.88 m (6 ft 2 in)	85 kg (187 lb)	345 cm (136 in)	330 cm (130 in)	(Italy) Cucine Lube Civitanova
4	Jean Patry	December 27, 1996	2.07 m (6 ft 9 in)	94 kg (207 lb)	337 cm (133 in)	314 cm (124 in)	(France) Montpellier UC
5	Trévor Clévenot	June 28, 1994	1.99 m (6 ft 6 in)	89 kg (196 lb)	335 cm (132 in)	316 cm (124 in)	(Italy) LPR Piacenza
6	Benjamin Toniutti (C)	October 30, 1989	1.83 m (6 ft 0 in)	73 kg (161 lb)	320 cm (130 in)	300 cm (120 in)	(Poland) ZAKSA Kędzierzyn-Koźle
7	Kevin Tillie	November 2, 1990	2.00 m (6 ft 7 in)	85 kg (187 lb)	347 cm (137 in)	327 cm (129 in)	(Poland) ZAKSA Kędzierzyn-Koźle
8	Julien Lyneel	April 15, 1990	1.92 m (6 ft 4 in)	87 kg (192 lb)	345 cm (136 in)	325 cm (128 in)	(Italy) Bunge Ravenna
9	Earvin N'Gapeth	February 12, 1991	1.94 m (6 ft 4 in)	93 kg (205 lb)	358 cm (141 in)	327 cm (129 in)	(Italy) Azimut Modena
10	Kévin Le Roux	May 11, 1989	2.09 m (6 ft 10 in)	98 kg (216 lb)	365 cm (144 in)	345 cm (136 in)	(Italy) Azimut Modena
11	Antoine Brizard	May 22, 1994	1.96 m (6 ft 5 in)	96 kg (212 lb)	340 cm (130 in)	310 cm (120 in)	(France) Spacer's de Toulouse
12	Stéphen Boyer	April 10, 1996	1.96 m (6 ft 5 in)	85 kg (187 lb)	335 cm (132 in)	314 cm (124 in)	(France) Chaumont VB 52
14	Nicolas Le Goff	February 15, 1992	2.06 m (6 ft 9 in)	105 kg (231 lb)	365 cm (144 in)	328 cm (129 in)	(Turkey) İstanbul Büyükşehir Belediyesi
16	Daryl Bultor	November 17, 1995	1.97 m (6 ft 6 in)	94 kg (207 lb)	342 cm (135 in)	317 cm (125 in)	(France) Montpellier UC
18	Thibault Rossard	August 28, 1993	1.93 m (6 ft 4 in)	85 kg (187 lb)	350 cm (140 in)	320 cm (130 in)	(Poland) Asseco Resovia Rzeszów
21	Barthélémy Chinenyeze	February 28, 1998	2.00 m (6 ft 7 in)	80 kg (180 lb)	357 cm (141 in)	332 cm (131 in)	(France) Spacer's de Toulouse

== Germany ==
The following is the German roster in the 2017 Men's European Volleyball Championship.

Head coach:	Andrea Giani
Assistants:

No.	Name	Date of birth	Height	Weight	Spike	Block	2016/17 club
1	Christian Fromm	15 August 1990	2.04 m (6 ft 8 in)	99 kg (218 lb)	345 cm (136 in)	324 cm (128 in)	(Italy) Gi Group Monza
3	Ruben Schott	8 July 1994	1.92 m (6 ft 4 in)	85 kg (187 lb)	326 cm (128 in)	309 cm (122 in)	(Germany) Berlin Recycling Volleys
7	Michael Andrei	6 August 1985	2.10 m (6 ft 11 in)	98 kg (216 lb)	345 cm (136 in)	340 cm (130 in)	(Belgium) Topvolley Antwerpen
6	Denys Kaliberda (C)	24 June 1990	1.93 m (6 ft 4 in)	95 kg (209 lb)	343 cm (135 in)	314 cm (124 in)	(Italy) Cucine Lube Civitanova
8	Marcus Böhme	25 August 1985	2.11 m (6 ft 11 in)	116 kg (256 lb)	360 cm (140 in)	330 cm (130 in)	(Poland) Cuprum Lubin
9	György Grozer	27 November 1984	2.00 m (6 ft 7 in)	99 kg (218 lb)	375 cm (148 in)	345 cm (136 in)	(Russia) Lokomotiv Novosibirsk
10	Linus Weber	1 November 1999	1.99 m (6 ft 6 in)	85 kg (187 lb)	336 cm (132 in)	321 cm (126 in)	(Germany) Berlin Recycling Volleys
11	Lukas Kampa	29 November 1986	1.95 m (6 ft 5 in)	90 kg (200 lb)	335 cm (132 in)	320 cm (130 in)	(Poland) Jastrzębski Węgiel
13	Simon Hirsch	3 April 1992	2.04 m (6 ft 8 in)	96 kg (212 lb)	352 cm (139 in)	344 cm (135 in)	(Italy) Gi Group Monza
14	Moritz Karlitzek	12 August 1996	1.91 m (6 ft 3 in)	91 kg (201 lb)	335 cm (132 in)	310 cm (120 in)	(Germany) Rottenburg
16	Julian Zenger	26 August 1997	1.90 m (6 ft 3 in)	80 kg (180 lb)	330 cm (130 in)	315 cm (124 in)	(Germany) Friedrichshafen
17	Jan Zimmermann	12 February 1993	1.90 m (6 ft 3 in)	82 kg (181 lb)	340 cm (130 in)	312 cm (123 in)	(Germany) United Volleys Rhein-Main
18	Noah Baxpöhler	13 August 1993	2.10 m (6 ft 11 in)	85 kg (187 lb)	345 cm (136 in)	331 cm (130 in)	(Germany) SVG Lüneburg
21	Tobias Krick	22 October 1998	2.11 m (6 ft 11 in)	85 kg (187 lb)	350 cm (140 in)	330 cm (130 in)	(Germany) United Volleys Rhein-Main

== Italy ==
The following is the Italian roster in the 2017 Men's European Volleyball Championship.

Head coach:	Gianlorenzo Blengini
Assistants:	Giampaolo Medei, Antonio Valentini

No.	Name	Date of birth	Height	Weight	Spike	Block	2016/17 club
2	Luigi Randazzo	30 April 1994	1.98 m (6 ft 6 in)	97 kg (214 lb)	352 cm (139 in)	255 cm (100 in)	(Italy) Calzedonia Verona
4	Luca Vettori	26 April 1991	2.00 m (6 ft 7 in)	95 kg (209 lb)	345 cm (136 in)	232 cm (91 in)	(Italy) Azimut Modena
5	Luca Spirito	30 October 1993	1.96 m (6 ft 5 in)	79 kg (174 lb)	338 cm (133 in)	262 cm (103 in)	(Italy) Bunge Ravenna
6	Simone Giannelli	9 August 1996	1.98 m (6 ft 6 in)	92 kg (203 lb)	350 cm (140 in)	330 cm (130 in)	(Italy) Diatec Trentino
7	Fabio Balaso	20 October 1995	1.78 m (5 ft 10 in)	73 kg (161 lb)	305 cm (120 in)	280 cm (110 in)	(Italy) Kioene Padova
9	Daniele Mazzone	4 June 1992	2.08 m (6 ft 10 in)	88 kg (194 lb)	315 cm (124 in)	309 cm (122 in)	(Italy) Diatec Trentino
10	Filippo Lanza	3 March 1991	1.98 m (6 ft 6 in)	98 kg (216 lb)	350 cm (140 in)	330 cm (130 in)	(Italy) Diatec Trentino
11	Simone Buti (C)	19 September 1983	2.06 m (6 ft 9 in)	100 kg (220 lb)	345 cm (136 in)	328 cm (129 in)	(Italy) Sir Sicoma Colussi Perugia
13	Massimo Colaci	21 February 1985	1.80 m (5 ft 11 in)	75 kg (165 lb)	314 cm (124 in)	306 cm (120 in)	(Italy) Diatec Trentino
14	Matteo Piano	24 October 1994	2.08 m (6 ft 10 in)	102 kg (225 lb)	352 cm (139 in)	325 cm (128 in)	(Italy) Azimut Modena
16	Oleg Antonov	28 July 1988	1.98 m (6 ft 6 in)	88 kg (194 lb)	340 cm (130 in)	310 cm (120 in)	(Italy) Diatec Trentino
17	Iacopo Botto	22 September 1987	1.91 m (6 ft 3 in)	76 kg (168 lb)	345 cm (136 in)	320 cm (130 in)	(Italy) Gi Group Monza
18	Giulio Sabbi	10 August 1989	2.01 m (6 ft 7 in)	92 kg (203 lb)	352 cm (139 in)	325 cm (128 in)	(Italy) Exprivia Molfetta
19	Fabio Ricci	11 July 1994	2.04 m (6 ft 8 in)	96 kg (212 lb)	348 cm (137 in)	272 cm (107 in)	(Italy) Bunge Ravenna

== Netherlands ==
The following is the Dutch roster in the 2017 Men's European Volleyball Championship.

Head coach:	Gido Vermeulen
Assistants:

No.	Name	Date of birth	Height	Weight	Spike	Block	2016/17 club
1	Daan van Haarlem	15 March 1989	1.98 m (6 ft 6 in)	89 kg (196 lb)	332 cm (131 in)	323 cm (127 in)	(Czech Republic) Vaše Kladno
2	Wessel Keemink	29 May 1993	1.97 m (6 ft 6 in)	81 kg (179 lb)	337 cm (133 in)	326 cm (128 in)	(Netherlands) SV Dynamo Apeldoorn
3	Dirk Sparidans	5 March 1989	1.81 m (5 ft 11 in)	86 kg (190 lb)	326 cm (128 in)	300 cm (120 in)	(Czech Republic) Vaše Kladno
4	Thijs ter Horst	18 September 1991	2.04 m (6 ft 8 in)	94 kg (207 lb)	364 cm (143 in)	344 cm (135 in)	(South Korea) Daejeon Samsung Bluefangs
5	Auke van De Kamp	31 July 1995	2.01 m (6 ft 7 in)	94 kg (207 lb)	345 cm (136 in)	322 cm (127 in)	(Netherlands) Abiant Lycurgus
6	Jasper Diefenbach (C)	17 March 1988	1.95 m (6 ft 5 in)	90 kg (200 lb)	345 cm (136 in)	330 cm (130 in)	(France) Nantes VB
7	Gijs Jorne	30 May 1989	1.96 m (6 ft 5 in)	85 kg (187 lb)	340 cm (130 in)	310 cm (120 in)	(France) Chaumont VB 52
8	Fabian Plak	23 July 1997	1.97 m (6 ft 6 in)	83 kg (183 lb)	330 cm (130 in)	326 cm (128 in)	(Netherlands) TalentTeam Papendal Arnhem
10	Jeroen Rauwerdink	13 September 1985	2.00 m (6 ft 7 in)	92 kg (203 lb)	350 cm (140 in)	320 cm (130 in)	(Turkey) Ziraat Bankası
14	Nimir Abdel-Aziz	5 February 1992	2.01 m (6 ft 7 in)	86 kg (190 lb)	365 cm (144 in)	350 cm (140 in)	(France) Poitiers VB
15	Thomas Koelewijn	18 December 1988	2.06 m (6 ft 9 in)	100 kg (220 lb)	360 cm (140 in)	350 cm (140 in)	(France) Montpellier VB
16	Wouter ter Maat	7 May 1991	2.00 m (6 ft 7 in)	90 kg (200 lb)	351 cm (138 in)	338 cm (133 in)	(Germany) Berlin Volleys
17	Michaël Parkinson	23 November 1991	2.03 m (6 ft 8 in)	98 kg (216 lb)	365 cm (144 in)	350 cm (140 in)	(Belgium) Lindemans Aalst
18	Robbert Adringa	28 April 1990	1.92 m (6 ft 4 in)	85 kg (187 lb)	330 cm (130 in)	310 cm (120 in)	(France) Poitiers VB

== Poland ==
The following is the Polish roster in the 2017 Men's European Volleyball Championship.

Head coach:	Ferdinando De Giorgi
Assistants:	Piotr Gruszka, Oskar Kaczmarczyk

No.	Name	Date of birth	Height	Weight	Spike	Block	2016/17 club
3	Dawid Konarski	August 31, 1989	1.98 m (6 ft 6 in)	93 kg (205 lb)	353 cm (139 in)	320 cm (130 in)	(Poland) ZAKSA Kędzierzyn-Koźle
5	Łukasz Kaczmarek	June 29, 1994	2.04 m (6 ft 8 in)	99 kg (218 lb)	354 cm (139 in)	332 cm (131 in)	(Poland) Cuprum Lubin
6	Bartosz Kurek	August 29, 1988	2.07 m (6 ft 9 in)	104 kg (229 lb)	375 cm (148 in)	340 cm (130 in)	(Poland) PGE Skra Bełchatów
7	Artur Szalpuk	March 20, 1995	2.02 m (6 ft 8 in)	91 kg (201 lb)	350 cm (140 in)	335 cm (132 in)	(Poland) PGE Skra Bełchatów
9	Bartłomiej Lemański	March 13, 1996	2.17 m (7 ft 1 in)	103 kg (227 lb)	360 cm (140 in)	345 cm (136 in)	(Poland) Asseco Resovia Rzeszów
10	Damian Wojtaszek	September 7, 1988	1.80 m (5 ft 11 in)	76 kg (168 lb)	330 cm (130 in)	301 cm (119 in)	(Poland) Asseco Resovia Rzeszów
11	Fabian Drzyzga	January 3, 1990	1.96 m (6 ft 5 in)	90 kg (200 lb)	335 cm (132 in)	325 cm (128 in)	(Poland) Asseco Resovia Rzeszów
12	Grzegorz Łomacz	October 1, 1987	1.87 m (6 ft 2 in)	81 kg (179 lb)	330 cm (130 in)	309 cm (122 in)	(Poland) Cuprum Lubin
13	Michał Kubiak (C)	February 23, 1988	1.93 m (6 ft 4 in)	87 kg (192 lb)	328 cm (129 in)	312 cm (123 in)	(Japan) Panasonic Panthers
15	Jakub Kochanowski	July 17, 1997	1.99 m (6 ft 6 in)	84 kg (185 lb)	348 cm (137 in)	313 cm (123 in)	(Poland) Indykpol AZS Olsztyn
16	Łukasz Wiśniewski	February 3, 1989	1.98 m (6 ft 6 in)	93 kg (205 lb)	347 cm (137 in)	335 cm (132 in)	(Poland) ZAKSA Kędzierzyn-Koźle
17	Paweł Zatorski	June 21, 1990	1.84 m (6 ft 0 in)	73 kg (161 lb)	328 cm (129 in)	311 cm (122 in)	(Poland) ZAKSA Kędzierzyn-Koźle
20	Mateusz Bieniek	April 5, 1994	2.10 m (6 ft 11 in)	98 kg (216 lb)	351 cm (138 in)	329 cm (130 in)	(Poland) ZAKSA Kędzierzyn-Koźle
21	Rafał Buszek	April 28, 1987	1.98 m (6 ft 6 in)	88 kg (194 lb)	347 cm (137 in)	327 cm (129 in)	(Poland) ZAKSA Kędzierzyn-Koźle

== Russia ==
The following is the Russian roster in the 2017 Men's European Volleyball Championship.

Head coach:	Sergey Shlyapnikov
Assistants:

No.	Name	Date of birth	Height	Weight	Spike	Block	2016/17 club
2	Ilya Vlasov	3 August 1995	2.12 m (6 ft 11 in)	98 kg (216 lb)	360 cm (140 in)	270 cm (110 in)	(Russia) Fakel Novy Urengoy
4	Artem Volvich	22 January 1990	2.12 m (6 ft 11 in)	98 kg (216 lb)	352 cm (139 in)	290 cm (110 in)	(Russia) Zenit Kazan
5	Sergey Grankin (C)	21 January 1985	1.95 m (6 ft 5 in)	96 kg (212 lb)	330 cm (130 in)	255 cm (100 in)	(Russia) Dinamo Moscow
7	Dmitry Volkov	25 May 1995	2.01 m (6 ft 7 in)	89 kg (196 lb)	340 cm (130 in)	260 cm (100 in)	(Russia) Fakel Novy Urengoy
9	Yuri Berezhko	27 January 1984	1.96 m (6 ft 5 in)	93 kg (205 lb)	342 cm (135 in)	255 cm (100 in)	(Russia) Dinamo Moscow
11	Andrey Ashchev	10 May 1983	2.02 m (6 ft 8 in)	105 kg (231 lb)	340 cm (130 in)	260 cm (100 in)	(Russia) Zenit Kazan
12	Aleksandr Butko	18 March 1986	1.98 m (6 ft 6 in)	97 kg (214 lb)	328 cm (129 in)	260 cm (100 in)	(Russia) Lokomotiv Novosibirsk
15	Egor Feoktistov	22 June 1993	2.01 m (6 ft 7 in)	93 kg (205 lb)	340 cm (130 in)	260 cm (100 in)	(Russia) Ural Ufa
16	Maksim Zhigalov	26 July 1989	2.01 m (6 ft 7 in)	86 kg (190 lb)	344 cm (135 in)	270 cm (110 in)	(Russia) Belogorie Belgorod
17	Maxim Mikhaylov	19 March 1988	2.02 m (6 ft 8 in)	103 kg (227 lb)	350 cm (140 in)	270 cm (110 in)	(Russia) Zenit Kazan
18	Egor Kliuka	15 June 1995	2.08 m (6 ft 10 in)	94 kg (207 lb)	360 cm (140 in)	270 cm (110 in)	(Russia) Fakel Novy Urengoy
20	Ilyas Kurkaev	18 January 1994	2.07 m (6 ft 9 in)	95 kg (209 lb)	355 cm (140 in)	270 cm (110 in)	(Russia) Lokomotiv Novosibirsk
21	Valentin Golubev	3 May 1992	1.90 m (6 ft 3 in)	78 kg (172 lb)	310 cm (120 in)	242 cm (95 in)	(Russia) Lokomotiv Novosibirsk
22	Roman Martinyuk	13 April 1987	1.82 m (6 ft 0 in)	75 kg (165 lb)	315 cm (124 in)	234 cm (92 in)	(Russia) Belogorie Belgorod

== Serbia ==
The following is the Serbian roster in the 2017 Men's European Volleyball Championship. Serbia achieved a bronze medal.

Head coach:	Nikola Grbić
Assistants:	Duško Nikolić, Nedžad Osmankač

No.	Name	Date of birth	Height	Weight	Spike	Block	2016/17 club
1	Aleksandar Okolić	26 June 1993	2.05 m (6 ft 9 in)	90 kg (200 lb)	347 cm (137 in)	320 cm (130 in)	(Germany) Berlin Recycling Volleys
2	Uroš Kovačević	6 May 1993	1.97 m (6 ft 6 in)	90 kg (200 lb)	340 cm (130 in)	320 cm (130 in)	(Italy) Calzedonia Verona
3	Milan Katić	22 October 1993	2.02 m (6 ft 8 in)	99 kg (218 lb)	345 cm (136 in)	331 cm (130 in)	(Poland) Łuczniczka Bydgoszcz
4	Nemanja Petrić (C)	28 July 1987	2.02 m (6 ft 8 in)	86 kg (190 lb)	333 cm (131 in)	320 cm (130 in)	(Italy) Azimut Modena
6	Goran Škundrić	23 November 1987	1.97 m (6 ft 6 in)	94 kg (207 lb)	340 cm (130 in)	320 cm (130 in)	(Romania) CS Tricolorul Ploiesti
7	Dragan Stanković	18 October 1985	2.05 m (6 ft 9 in)	80 kg (180 lb)	343 cm (135 in)	333 cm (131 in)	(Italy) Cucine Lube Civitanova
9	Nikola Jovović	13 February 1992	1.97 m (6 ft 6 in)	75 kg (165 lb)	335 cm (132 in)	315 cm (124 in)	(Italy) Gi Group Monza
11	Maksim Buculjević	20 September 1991	1.92 m (6 ft 4 in)	83 kg (183 lb)	320 cm (130 in)	307 cm (121 in)	(Slovenia) ACH Volley
14	Aleksandar Atanasijević	4 September 1991	2.00 m (6 ft 7 in)	92 kg (203 lb)	350 cm (140 in)	329 cm (130 in)	(Italy) Sir Sicoma Colussi Perugia
16	Dražen Luburić	2 November 1993	2.02 m (6 ft 8 in)	90 kg (200 lb)	337 cm (133 in)	331 cm (130 in)	(Japan) JT Thunders Hiroshima
17	Neven Majstorović	17 March 1989	1.93 m (6 ft 4 in)	90 kg (200 lb)	335 cm (132 in)	325 cm (128 in)	(France) Rennes Volley 35
18	Marko Podraščanin	29 August 1987	2.03 m (6 ft 8 in)	100 kg (220 lb)	354 cm (139 in)	332 cm (131 in)	(Italy) Sir Sicoma Colussi Perugia
19	Nikola Rosić	5 August 1984	1.92 m (6 ft 4 in)	84 kg (185 lb)	328 cm (129 in)	315 cm (124 in)	(Romania) CS Arcada Galați
20	Srećko Lisinac	17 May 1992	2.05 m (6 ft 9 in)	90 kg (200 lb)	355 cm (140 in)	342 cm (135 in)	(Poland) PGE Skra Bełchatów

== Slovakia ==
The following is the Slovak roster in the 2017 Men's European Volleyball Championship.

Head coach:	Andrej Kravarik
Assistants:

No.	Name	Date of birth	Height	Weight	Spike	Block	2016/17 club
1	Milan Bencz	5 September 1987	2.06 m (6 ft 9 in)	99 kg (218 lb)	363 cm (143 in)	342 cm (135 in)	(France) Narbonne VB
3	Emanuel Kohút (C)	21 July 1982	2.06 m (6 ft 9 in)	97 kg (214 lb)	359 cm (141 in)	345 cm (136 in)	(Poland) GKS Katowice
4	Peter Ondrovič	28 March 1995	1.99 m (6 ft 6 in)	95 kg (209 lb)	347 cm (137 in)	325 cm (128 in)	(Germany) TSV Herrsching
5	Matej Kubš	26 May 1988	1.88 m (6 ft 2 in)	82 kg (181 lb)	341 cm (134 in)	315 cm (124 in)	(Slovakia) Bystrina SPU Nitra
8	Daniel Končal	16 September 1982	1.88 m (6 ft 2 in)	84 kg (185 lb)	319 cm (126 in)	300 cm (120 in)	(Czech Republic) VK Karlovarsko
9	Peter Mlynarčík	29 November 1991	2.00 m (6 ft 7 in)	98 kg (216 lb)	350 cm (140 in)	330 cm (130 in)	(Austria) SK Posojilnica Aich/Dob
10	Marcel Lux	27 July 1994	2.00 m (6 ft 7 in)	92 kg (203 lb)	341 cm (134 in)	315 cm (124 in)	(Slovakia) Mirad Prešov
11	Martin Turis	27 August 1993	1.81 m (5 ft 11 in)	83 kg (183 lb)	325 cm (128 in)	310 cm (120 in)	(Slovakia) Bystrina SPU Nitra
12	Matej Paták	8 June 1990	1.97 m (6 ft 6 in)	88 kg (194 lb)	353 cm (139 in)	330 cm (130 in)	(France) Chaumont VB 52
13	Štefan Chrtianský	17 August 1989	2.07 m (6 ft 9 in)	97 kg (214 lb)	350 cm (140 in)	335 cm (132 in)	(Austria) Hypo Tirol Innsbruck
15	Juraj Zaťko	5 June 1987	1.92 m (6 ft 4 in)	87 kg (192 lb)	347 cm (137 in)	320 cm (130 in)	(Slovakia) Bystrina SPU Nitra
16	Radoslav Prešinský	14 January 1989	2.06 m (6 ft 9 in)	100 kg (220 lb)	345 cm (136 in)	327 cm (129 in)	(Czech Republic) Aero Odolena Voda
20	Michal Petras	5 December 1996	1.91 m (6 ft 3 in)	81 kg (179 lb)	358 cm (141 in)	310 cm (120 in)	(Austria) SK Posojilnica Aich/Dob
21	Marek Ludha	19 November 1993	2.00 m (6 ft 7 in)	90 kg (200 lb)	349 cm (137 in)	327 cm (129 in)	(Slovakia) Bystrina SPU Nitra

== Slovenia ==
The following is the Slovenian roster in the 2017 Men's European Volleyball Championship.

Head coach:	Slobodan Kovač
Assistants:

No.	Name	Date of birth	Height	Weight	Spike	Block	2016/17 club
1	Tonček Štern	14 November 1995	1.98 m (6 ft 6 in)	95 kg (209 lb)	352 cm (139 in)	340 cm (130 in)	(Italy) Calzedonia Verona
2	Alen Pajenk	23 April 1986	2.03 m (6 ft 8 in)	92 kg (203 lb)	366 cm (144 in)	336 cm (132 in)	(Turkey) Fenerbahçe Istanbul
3	Žiga Štern	2 January 1994	1.93 m (6 ft 4 in)	88 kg (194 lb)	346 cm (136 in)	330 cm (130 in)	(Slovenia) ACH Volley Ljubljana
4	Jan Kozamernik	24 December 1995	2.04 m (6 ft 8 in)	103 kg (227 lb)	360 cm (140 in)	340 cm (130 in)	(Slovenia) ACH Volley Ljubljana
5	Alen Šket	28 March 1988	2.05 m (6 ft 9 in)	92 kg (203 lb)	350 cm (140 in)	336 cm (132 in)	(Turkey) Fenerbahçe Istanbul
6	Mitja Gasparini	26 June 1984	2.02 m (6 ft 8 in)	93 kg (205 lb)	346 cm (136 in)	333 cm (131 in)	(South Korea) Incheon Korean Air Jumbos
9	Dejan Vinčić	15 September 1986	2.00 m (6 ft 7 in)	93 kg (205 lb)	354 cm (139 in)	338 cm (133 in)	(Turkey) Halkbank Ankara
10	Sašo Štalekar	3 May 1996	2.14 m (7 ft 0 in)	98 kg (216 lb)	354 cm (139 in)	340 cm (130 in)	(Slovenia) Calcit Volleyball
11	Danijel Koncilja	4 September 1990	2.01 m (6 ft 7 in)	94 kg (207 lb)	360 cm (140 in)	340 cm (130 in)	(Italy) Kioene Padova
12	Jan Klobučar	11 December 1992	1.96 m (6 ft 5 in)	92 kg (203 lb)	344 cm (135 in)	325 cm (128 in)	(Germany) United Volleys Rhein-Main
13	Jani Kovačič	14 June 1992	1.86 m (6 ft 1 in)	83 kg (183 lb)	320 cm (130 in)	305 cm (120 in)	(Slovenia) ACH Volley Ljubljana
14	Urban Toman	21 October 1997	1.85 m (6 ft 1 in)	82 kg (181 lb)	310 cm (120 in)	295 cm (116 in)	(Slovenia) Triglav Kranj
16	Gregor Ropret	1 March 1989	1.92 m (6 ft 4 in)	89 kg (196 lb)	343 cm (135 in)	325 cm (128 in)	(Turkey) Afyon Belediye
17	Tine Urnaut (C)	3 September 1988	2.00 m (6 ft 7 in)	88 kg (194 lb)	365 cm (144 in)	332 cm (131 in)	(Italy) Diatec Trentino

== Spain ==
The following is the Spanish roster in the 2017 Men's European Volleyball Championship.

Head coach:	Fernando Muñoz
Assistants:	Miguel Rivera, Jorge Rodriguez, Juan José Susin

No.	Name	Date of birth	Height	Weight	Spike	Block	2016/17 club
1	Andrés Villena	February 27, 1993	1.94 m (6 ft 4 in)	88 kg (194 lb)	356 cm (140 in)	330 cm (130 in)	(Spain) Ca'n Ventura Palma
2	Ángel Trinidad	March 27, 1993	1.95 m (6 ft 5 in)	78 kg (172 lb)	342 cm (135 in)	318 cm (125 in)	(Belgium) Knack Randstad Roeselare
3	Sergio Noda	March 23, 1987	1.91 m (6 ft 3 in)	87 kg (192 lb)	338 cm (133 in)	325 cm (128 in)	(Italy) Emma Villas Siena
5	Alejandro Vigil	February 11, 1993	2.04 m (6 ft 8 in)	89 kg (196 lb)	348 cm (137 in)	330 cm (130 in)	(Belgium) Noliko Maaseik
6	Borja Ruiz	July 26, 1992	2.00 m (6 ft 7 in)	87 kg (192 lb)	340 cm (130 in)	330 cm (130 in)	(Spain) Unicaja Almería
7	Jorge Almansa	April 17, 1991	1.95 m (6 ft 5 in)	81 kg (179 lb)	338 cm (133 in)	325 cm (128 in)	(Romania) Steaua București
10	Jorge Fernández (C)	May 4, 1989	2.01 m (6 ft 7 in)	90 kg (200 lb)	345 cm (136 in)	325 cm (128 in)	(Spain) Ca'n Ventura Palma
11	Miguel Ángel de Amo	September 16, 1985	1.85 m (6 ft 1 in)	79 kg (174 lb)	342 cm (135 in)	320 cm (130 in)	(Spain) Unicaja Almería
13	Daniel Ruiz Posadas	June 28, 1995	1.90 m (6 ft 3 in)	82 kg (181 lb)	305 cm (120 in)	190 cm (75 in)	(Spain) Vecindario ACEGC
14	Miguel Ángel Fornés	September 6, 1993	2.02 m (6 ft 8 in)	94 kg (207 lb)	354 cm (139 in)	339 cm (133 in)	(Belgium) Knack Randstad Roeselare
15	Francisco Iribarne	July 13, 1998	1.99 m (6 ft 6 in)	91 kg (201 lb)	336 cm (132 in)	328 cm (129 in)	(Spain) Melilla
17	Francisco Ruiz	June 7, 1991	1.78 m (5 ft 10 in)	70 kg (150 lb)	334 cm (131 in)	310 cm (120 in)	(Spain) Ca'n Ventura Palma
18	Juan González	January 11, 1994	1.92 m (6 ft 4 in)	83 kg (183 lb)	334 cm (131 in)	315 cm (124 in)	(Spain) Unicaja Almería
22	Augusto Colito	January 23, 1997	1.90 m (6 ft 3 in)	81 kg (179 lb)	345 cm (136 in)	330 cm (130 in)	(Spain) C.V. L'Illa-Grau

== Turkey ==
The following is the Turkish roster in the 2017 Men's European Volleyball Championship.

Head coach:	Joško Milenkoski
Assistants:

No.	Name	Date of birth	Height	Weight	Spike	Block	2016/17 club
1	Emre Batur	21 April 1988	2.01 m (6 ft 7 in)	95 kg (209 lb)	338 cm (133 in)	325 cm (128 in)	(Turkey) Halkbank Ankara
3	Mert Matić	22 May 1995	2.10 m (6 ft 11 in)	105 kg (231 lb)	360 cm (140 in)	350 cm (140 in)	(Turkey) İstanbul BBSK
4	Baturalp Burak Güngör	28 July 1993	1.90 m (6 ft 3 in)	84 kg (185 lb)	351 cm (138 in)	338 cm (133 in)	(Turkey) Ziraat Bankası Ankara
5	Hasan Yeşilbudak	11 January 1984	1.90 m (6 ft 3 in)	83 kg (183 lb)	342 cm (135 in)	329 cm (130 in)	(Turkey) Halkbank Ankara
7	Gökhan Gökgöz	6 January 1993	2.00 m (6 ft 7 in)	95 kg (209 lb)	347 cm (137 in)	334 cm (131 in)	(Turkey) Arkas İzmir
8	Burutay Subaşı	15 July 1990	1.94 m (6 ft 4 in)	99 kg (218 lb)	352 cm (139 in)	339 cm (133 in)	(Turkey) Halkbank Ankara
9	Hakki Capkinoglu	20 July 1990	2.00 m (6 ft 7 in)	75 kg (165 lb)	352 cm (139 in)	337 cm (133 in)	(Turkey) Arkas İzmir
10	Arslan Ekşi (C)	17 July 1985	1.98 m (6 ft 6 in)	90 kg (200 lb)	335 cm (132 in)	322 cm (127 in)	(Turkey) İstanbul BBSK
12	İzzet Ünver	1 January 1992	1.95 m (6 ft 5 in)	87 kg (192 lb)	332 cm (131 in)	319 cm (126 in)	(Turkey) Maliye Milli Piyango
13	Alperay Demirciler	1 February 1993	1.78 m (5 ft 10 in)	72 kg (159 lb)	275 cm (108 in)	263 cm (104 in)	(Turkey) Fenerbahçe
14	Faik Samet Güneş	27 May 1993	2.05 m (6 ft 9 in)	103 kg (227 lb)	342 cm (135 in)	329 cm (130 in)	(Turkey) Halkbank Ankara
15	Metin Toy	3 May 1994	2.01 m (6 ft 7 in)	100 kg (220 lb)	358 cm (141 in)	345 cm (136 in)	(Turkey) Fenerbahçe
16	Murat Yenipazar	1 January 1993	1.94 m (6 ft 4 in)	94 kg (207 lb)	354 cm (139 in)	341 cm (134 in)	(Austria) Hypo Tirol Innsbruck
18	Kadir Cin	7 May 1987	2.02 m (6 ft 8 in)	95 kg (209 lb)	343 cm (135 in)	326 cm (128 in)	(Turkey) Arkas İzmir
