= 2013 Men's European Volleyball Championship squads =

This article shows all participating team squads at the 2013 Men's European Volleyball Championship, held in Denmark and Poland from 20 to 29 September 2013.

== Belarus ==
The following is the Belarusian roster in the 2013 Men's European Volleyball Championship.

Head coach:	Victor Sidelnikov
Assistant:	Viktar Beksha

No.	Name	Date of birth	2013 club
1	Andrei Radziuk	20 March 1990	(Belarus) VK Minsk
2	Pavel Audochanka	13 January 1990	(Belarus) VK Shahter Salihorsk
3	Viachaslau Charapovich	8 February 1992	(Belarus) VK Metallurg Zhlobin
4	Siarhei Antanovich	21 April 1986	(Turkey) İstanbul Büyükşehir Belediyesi
5	Siarhei Busel	30 May 1989	(Belarus) VK Minsk
7	Aleh Achrem	12 March 1983	(Poland) Asseco Resovia Rzeszów
8	Dzmitry Zhehzdryn	2 April 1982	(Belarus) Kommunalnik Grodno
10	Aliaksei Kurash	1 June 1988	(Belarus) Kommunalnik Grodno
11	Stanislau Zabarouski	4 January 1988	(Belarus) Kommunalnik Grodno
12	Artsiom Haramykin	16 May 1985	(Belarus) VK Minsk
13	Dzmitry Likharad	9 May 1977	(Belarus) VK Minsk
14	Eduard Venski	21 April 1977	(Finland) Vammalan Lentopallo
15	Oleg Mikanovich	7 October 1975	(Belarus) VK Minsk
17	Maksim Marozau	29 May 1989	(Belarus) VK Shahter Salihorsk

== Belgium ==
The following is the Belgian roster in the 2013 Men's European Volleyball Championship.

Head coach:	Dominique Baeyens
Assistant:	Christophe Achten

No.	Name	Date of birth	2013 club
1	Bram Van Den Dries	14 August 1989	(Italy) Altotevere San Giustino
2	Hendrik Tuerlinckx	1 December 1987	(Belgium) Knack Randstad Roeselare
3	Sam Deroo	24 April 1992	(Italy) Casa Modena
4	Pieter Coolman	24 April 1989	(Belgium) Knack Randstad Roeselare
5	Frank Depestele	3 September 1977	(Ukraine) VK Lokomotiv Kharkiv
6	Stijn Dejonckheere	21 January 1988	(Belgium) Knack Randstad Roeselare
7	Gertjan Claes	30 March 1985	(Belgium) Knack Randstad Roeselare
8	Kevin Klinkenberg	4 October 1990	(Belgium) Noliko Maaseik
9	Pieter Verhees	8 December 1989	(Italy) Andreoli Latina
10	Simon Van de Voorde	19 December 1989	(Belgium) Noliko Maaseik
11	Matthijs Verhanneman	8 December 1988	(Italy) Pallavolo Molfetta
12	Gert Van Walle	7 August 1987	(Italy) Pallavolo Città di Castello
13	Tim Verschueren	24 December 1978	(Belgium) VC Euphony Asse-Lennik
14	Bert Derkoningen	10 July 1982	(Belgium) Noliko Maaseik

== Bulgaria ==
The following is the Bulgarian roster in the 2013 Men's European Volleyball Championship.

Head coach:	Camillo Placì
Assistant:	Marco Camperi

No.	Name	Date of birth	2013 club
1	Georgi Bratoev	21 October 1987	(Bulgaria) Levski Sofia
4	Martin Bozhilov	11 April 1988	(Bulgaria) VC Marek Union-Ivkoni
5	Svetoslav Gocev	21 August 1990	(Italy) Marmi Lanza Verona
6	Danail Milušev	2 March 1984	(Italy) Argos Sora
8	Todor Skrimov	9 June 1990	(France) Paris Volley
9	Dobromir Dimitrov	7 July 1991	(Bulgaria) VK Pirin Razlog
10	Valentin Bratoev	21 October 1987	(Bulgaria) Levski Sofia
12	Viktor Yosifov	16 October 1985	(Italy) New Mater Castellana Grotte
13	Teodor Salparov	16 August 1982	(Turkey) Galatasaray SK
14	Teodor Todorov	1 September 1989	(Russia) Gazprom-Ugra Surgut
15	Todor Aleksiev	21 April 1983	(Russia) Gazprom-Ugra Surgut
17	Nikolay Penchev	22 May 1992	(Poland) Effector Kielce
18	Nikolay Nikolov	29 July 1986	(Iran) Matin Varamin VC
19	Tsvetan Sokolov	31 December 1989	(Italy) Bre Banca Lannutti Cuneo

== Czech Republic ==
The following is the Czech roster in the 2013 Men's European Volleyball Championship.

Head coach:	Steward Bernard
Assistant:	Zdeněk Šmejkal

No.	Name	Date of birth	2013 club
1	Michal Finger	2 September 1993	(Czech Republic) ČZU Praga
3	Ondřej Boula	22 November 1987	(Belarus) VK Shahter Salihorsk
4	Tomáš Hýský	2 November 1983	(Czech Republic) VK Dukla Liberec
5	Jiří Král	8 July 1981	(France) Beauvais Oise UC
7	Aleš Holubec	13 March 1984	(France) Nantes Rezé Métropole Volley
9	Ondřej Hudeček	9 May 1981	(France) Beauvais Oise UC
10	Václav Kopáček	21 October 1982	(Czech Republic) VK Dukla Liberec
12	David Juracka	27 May 1989	(Czech Republic) Jihostroj České Budějovice
13	Kamil Baránek	2 May 1983	(France) Tours Volley-Ball
14	Adam Bartoš	27 April 1992	(Czech Republic) VSC Zlín
15	Jan Štokr	16 January 1983	(Italy) Trentino Volley
16	Tomáš Široký	26 October 1982	(Czech Republic) VK Ostrava
17	David Konečný	10 October 1982	(France) Tours Volley-Ball
18	Lukáš Ticháček	12 January 1982	(Poland) Asseco Resovia Rzeszów

== Denmark ==
The following is the Danish roster in the 2013 Men's European Volleyball Championship.

Head coach:	Fred Sturm
Assistant:	Martin Olafsen

No.	Name	Date of birth	2013 club
1	Peter Jensen	17 March 1990	(Denmark) Marienlyst Odense
2	Kristian Knudsen	1 August 1979	(France) Grand Nancy Volley-Ball
3	Simon Bitsch	22 December 1990	(Denmark) Middelfart VK
4	Sigurd Verming	19 February 1994	(Denmark) Marienlyst Odense
5	Simon Gade	6 September 1991	(Denmark) Holte IF
6	Aske Sorensen	20 April 1993	(Denmark) Gentofte Volley
8	Axel Jacobsen	10 July 1984	(Germany) TV Bühl
12	Mads Ditlevsen	13 June 1984	(Belgium) Brabo Antwerpen
13	Peter Bonnesen	13 March 1993	(Germany) VfB Friedrichshafen
14	Casper Christiansen	25 June 1986	(France) Grand Nancy Volley-Ball
16	Martin Stenderup	25 March 1985	(Netherlands) Langhenkel Orion
18	Rune Huss	18 May 1989	(Denmark) Gentofte Volley
19	Frederik Mikelsons	18 April 1991	(Denmark) Gentofte Volley
20	Thomas Pedersen	12 January 1993	(Denmark) Holte IF

== Finland ==
The following is the Finnish roster in the 2013 Men's European Volleyball Championship.

Head coach:	Tuomas Sammelvuo
Assistant:	Jaana Laurila

No.	Name	Date of birth	2013 club
2	Eemi Tervaportti	26 July 1989	(Belgium) Knack Randstad Roeselare
3	Mikko Esko	3 September 1978	(Russia) Guberniya Nizhniy Novgorod
4	Lauri Kerminen	18 January 1993	(Finland) Kokkolan Tiikerit
5	Antti Siltala	14 March 1984	(Italy) Argos Sora
6	Niklas Seppänen	30 June 1993	(Finland) Korson Veto
10	Urpo Sivula	15 March 1988	(Finland) Kokkolan Tiikerit
11	Juho Rajala	6 August 1985	(Finland) Raision Loimu
12	Olli Kunnari	2 February 1982	(Finland) Vammalan Lentopallo
13	Mikko Oivanen	26 June 1986	(Finland) Hurrikaani Loimaa
14	Konstantin Shumov	15 February 1985	(Germany) Generali Unterhaching
15	Matti Oivanen	26 May 1986	(Finland) Hurrikaani Loimaa
18	Jukka Lehtonen	22 February 1982	(Switzerland) Pallavolo Lugano

== France ==
The following is the French roster in the 2013 Men's European Volleyball Championship.

Head coach:	Laurent Tillie
Assistant:	Arnaud Josserand

No.	Name	Date of birth	2013 club
1	Jonas Aguenier	28 April 1992	(France) Nantes Rezé Métropole Volley
2	Jenia Grebennikov	13 August 1990	(France) Rennes Volley 35
3	Gérald Hardy-Dessources	9 February 1983	(France) Tours VB
4	Antonin Rouzier	18 August 1986	(Poland) ZAKSA Kędzierzyn-Koźle
5	Rafael Redwitz	12 August 1980	(Russia) Iskra Odintsovo
6	Benjamin Toniutti	30 October 1989	(France) Arago de Sète
11	Julien Lyneel	15 April 1990	(France) Montpellier UC
12	Earvin N'Gapeth	21 February 1991	(Italy) Bre Banca Lannutti Cuneo
14	Nicolas Le Goff	15 February 1992	(France) Montpellier UC
15	Samuel Tuia	24 July 1986	(Russia) Kuzbass Kemerovo
16	Kévin Tillie	2 November 1990	(United States) UC Irvine
18	Jean-François Exiga	9 March 1982	(France) Tours VB
20	Kévin Le Roux	11 May 1989	(France) AS Cannes Volley-Ball
21	Mory Sidibé	17 June 1987	(Slovenia) ACH Volley

== Germany ==
The following is the German roster in the 2013 Men's European Volleyball Championship.

Head coach:	Vital Heynen
Assistant:	Stefan Hübner

No.	Name	Date of birth	2013 club
1	Christian Fromm	15 August 1990	(Italy) Pallavolo Città di Castello
2	Markus Steuerwald	7 March 1989	(France) Paris Volley
3	Sebastian Schwarz	2 October 1985	(Italy) Sir Safety Perugia
4	Simon Tischer	24 April 1982	(Poland) Jastrzębski Węgiel
6	Denis Kaliberda	24 June 1990	(Italy) Tonno Callipo Vibo Valentia
8	Marcus Böhme	25 August 1985	(Italy) Altotevere San Giustino
9	Georg Grozer	27 November 1984	(Russia) Belogorie Belgorod
10	Jochen Schöps	3 October 1983	(Poland) Asseco Resovia Rzeszów
11	Lukas Kampa	29 November 1986	(Russia) Belogorie Belgorod
12	Ferdinand Tille	8 December 1988	(France) Arago de Sète
14	Tom Strohbach	27 May 1992	(Germany) Generali Unterhaching
15	Tim Broshog	2 December 1987	(Germany) Moerser SC
19	Björn Höhne	27 March 1991	(Germany) Berlin Recycling Volleys
20	Philipp Collin	28 October 1990	(Germany) VC Dresda

== Italy ==
The following is the Italian roster in the 2013 Men's European Volleyball Championship.

Head coach:	Mauro Berruto
Assistant:	Andrea Brogioni

No.	Name	Date of birth	2013 club
1	Thomas Beretta	18 April 1990	(Italy) Vero Volley Monza
2	Jiří Kovář	10 April 1989	(Italy) Cucine Lube Macerata
3	Simone Parodi	16 June 1986	(Italy) Cucine Lube Macerata
4	Luca Vettori	16 April 1991	(Italy) Copra Elior Piacenza
7	Salvatore Rossini	13 July 1986	(Italy) Andreoli Latina
8	Davide Saitta	23 June 1987	(Italy) Pallavolo Molfetta
9	Ivan Zaytsev	2 October 1988	(Italy) Cucine Lube Macerata
10	Filippo Lanza	3 March 1991	(Italy) Diatec Trentino
11	Cristian Savani	22 February 1982	(Italy) Cucine Lube Macerata
12	Daniele Mazzone	4 June 1992	(Italy) Argos Sora
13	Dragan Travica	28 August 1986	(Italy) Cucine Lube Macerata
14	Matteo Piano	24 October 1990	(Italy) Pallavolo Città di Castello
15	Emanuele Birarelli	8 February 1981	(Italy) Diatec Trentino
17	Andrea Giovi	19 August 1983	(Italy) Sir Safety Perugia

== Netherlands ==
The following is the Dutch roster in the 2013 Men's European Volleyball Championship.

Head coach:	Edwin Benne
Assistant:	Henk-Jan Held

No.	Name	Date of birth	2013 club
1	Nimir Abdel-Aziz	5 February 1992	(Italy) Bre Banca Lannutti Cuneo
2	Nico Freriks	22 December 1981	(Germany) Moerser SC
4	Thijs ter Horst	18 September 1991	(Italy) Marmi Lanza Verona
5	Jelte Maan	19 March 1986	(Belgium) Noliko Maaseik
7	Gijs Jorna	30 May 1989	(Netherlands) Brabo Antwerpen
8	Sebastiaan Van Bemmelen	18 August 1989	(Netherlands) Brabo Antwerpen
10	Jeroen Rauwerdink	13 September 1985	(Italy) Andreoli Latina
12	Wytze Kooistra	3 June 1982	(Poland) PGE Skra Bełchatów
13	Maarten Van Garderen	24 January 1990	(Italy) Corigliano Volley
14	Niels Klapwijk	19 September 1985	(Italy) Tonno Callipo Vibo Valentia
15	Thomas Koelewijn	18 December 1988	(Netherlands) Brabo Antwerpen
16	Robin Overbeeke	21 March 1989	(Belgium) VC Euphony Asse-Lennik
17	Johannes Bontje	21 May 1981	(Poland) Jastrzębski Węgiel
18	Robbert Andringa	28 April 1990	(Netherlands) Lycurgus Groningen

== Poland ==
The following is the Polish roster in the 2013 Men's European Volleyball Championship.

Head coach:	Andrea Anastasi
Assistant:	Andrea Gardini

No.	Name	Date of birth	2013 club
1	Piotr Nowakowski	18 December 1987	(Poland) Asseco Resovia Rzeszów
2	Michał Winiarski	28 September 1983	(Poland) PGE Skra Bełchatów
6	Bartosz Kurek	29 August 1988	(Russia) Dinamo Moscow
7	Jakub Jarosz	10 February 1987	(Italy) Andreoli Latina
8	Andrzej Wrona	27 December 1988	(Poland) Delecta Bydgoszcz
10	Łukasz Wiśniewski	3 February 1989	(Poland) ZAKSA Kędzierzyn-Koźle
11	Fabian Drzyzga	3 January 1990	(Poland) AZS Politechnika Warszawska
13	Michał Kubiak	23 February 1988	(Poland) Jastrzębski Węgiel
14	Michał Ruciak	22 August 1983	(Poland) ZAKSA Kędzierzyn-Koźle
15	Łukasz Żygadło	2 August 1979	(Russia) Fakel Novy Urengoy
17	Paweł Zatorski	21 August 1990	(Poland) PGE Skra Bełchatów
18	Marcin Możdżonek	9 February 1985	(Poland) ZAKSA Kędzierzyn-Koźle
21	Damian Wojtaszek	7 September 1988	(Poland) Jastrzębski Węgiel
22	Grzegorz Bociek	6 June 1991	(Poland) AZS Częstochowa

== Russia ==
The following is the Russian roster in the 2013 Men's European Volleyball Championship.

Head coach:	Andrey Voronkov
Assistant:	Sergio Busato

No.	Name	Date of birth	2013 club
2	Sergey Makarov (C)	28 March 1980	(Russia) Belogorie Belgorod
3	Nikolay Apalikov	26 August 1982	(Russia) Zenit Kazan
5	Sergey Grankin	21 January 1985	(Russia) Dinamo Moscow
6	Evgeny Sivozhelez	6 August 1986	(Russia) Zenit Kazan
7	Nikolay Pavlov	22 May 1982	(Russia) Guberniya Nizhniy Novgorod
9	Aleksey Spiridonov	26 June 1988	(Russia) Ural Ufa
10	Ilia Žilin	10 May 1985	(Russia) Lokomotiv Novosibirsk
11	Andrey Ashchev	10 May 1983	(Russia) Ural Ufa
13	Dmitry Muserskiy	29 October 1988	(Russia) Belogorie Belgorod
14	Artem Volvich	22 January 1990	(Russia) Lokomotiv Novosibirsk
15	Dmitry Ilinikh	31 January 1987	(Russia) Belogorie Belgorod
16	Aleksey Verbov	31 January 1982	(Russia) Ural Ufa
17	Maxim Mikhaylov	19 March 1988	(Russia) Zenit Kazan
20	Artem Ermakov	16 March 1982	(Russia) Belogorie Belgorod

== Serbia ==
The following is the Serbian roster in the 2013 Men's European Volleyball Championship.

Head coach:	Igor Kolaković
Assistant:	Strahinja Kozić

No.	Name	Date of birth	2013 club
1	Nikola Kovačević	14 February 1983	(Poland) Asseco Resovia Rzeszów
3	Marko Ivović	22 December 1990	(Turkey) Maliye Milli Piyango SK
4	Nemanja Petrić	28 July 1987	(Italy) Sir Safety Perugia
5	Vlado Petković	6 January 1983	(Iran) Kalleh Mazandaran
7	Dragan Stanković	18 October 1985	(Italy) Cucine Lube Macerata
8	Filip Vujić	17 September 1989	(Serbia) Crvena Zvezda Belgrade
9	Nikola Jovović	13 February 1992	(Germany) VfB Friedrichshafen
10	Miloš Nikić	31 March 1986	(Russia) Guberniya Nizhniy Novgorod
12	Milan Rašić	2 February 1985	(Slovenia) ACH Volley Ljubljana
14	Aleksandar Atanasijević	4 September 1991	(Poland) PGE Skra Bełchatów
15	Saša Starović	19 October 1988	(Italy) Cucine Lube Macerata
18	Marko Podraščanin	29 August 1987	(Italy) Cucine Lube Macerata
19	Nikola Rosić	5 August 1984	(Germany) VfB Friedrichshafen
20	Srećko Lisinac	17 May 1992	(Poland) AZS Częstochowa

== Slovakia ==
The following is the Slovak roster in the 2013 Men's European Volleyball Championship.

Head coach:	Štefan Chrtianský
Assistant:	Andrej Kravárik

No.	Name	Date of birth	2013 club
1	Milan Bencz	5 October 1987	(France) Arago de Sète
2	Michal Masný	14 August 1979	(Poland) Delecta Bydgoszcz
3	Emanuel Kohút	21 July 1982	(Italy) Bre Banca Lannutti Cuneo
6	Róbert Hupka	30 July 1981	(Germany) Generali Unterhaching
9	Roman Ondrušek	6 February 1980	(France) Cambrai Volley-Ball
10	Martin Nemec	31 July 1984	(South Korea) Incheon Korean Air Jumbos
12	Matej Paták	8 June 1990	(Slovakia) VT Bratislava
13	Štefan Chrtianský	17 August 1989	(Italy) Trentino Volley
14	Tomáš Kmeť	1 December 1981	(Germany) Berlin Recycling Volleys
15	Juraj Zaťko	5 June 1987	(Germany) VfB Friedrichshafen
17	František Ogurčák	24 April 1984	(Italy) Copra Elior Piacenza
19	Michal Hruška	13 March 1987	(Austria) SK Posojilnica Aich-Dob

== Slovenia ==
The following is the Slovenian roster in the 2013 Men's European Volleyball Championship.

Head coach:	Luka Slabe
Assistant:	Gašper Ribič

No.	Name	Date of birth	2013 club
1	Andrej Flajs	11 March 1983	(Slovenia) ACH Volley
2	Alen Pajenk	23 April 1986	(Italy) Cucine Lube Macerata
5	Alen Šket	28 March 1988	(Slovenia) ACH Volley
6	Mitja Gasparini	24 June 1984	(South Korea) Cheonan Hyundai Capital Skywalkers
7	Matevž Kamnik	24 November 1987	(Slovenia) ACH Volley
8	Miha Plot	11 May 1987	(Belgium) VC Euphony Asse-Lennik
9	Dejan Vinčić	15 September 1986	(Poland) PGE Skra Bełchatów
11	Danijel Koncilja	4 September 1990	(Austria) SK Posojilnica Aich-Dob
13	Tine Urnaut	3 September 1987	(Italy) Tonno Callipo Vibo Valentia
14	Jan Pokeršnik	15 December 1989	(Slovenia) ACH Volley
15	Matej Vidič	6 November 1986	(Slovenia) ACH Volley
16	Gregor Ropret	1 March 1989	(Slovenia) ACH Volley
17	Jani Kovačič	14 June 1992	(Austria) SK Posojilnica Aich-Dob
18	Klemen Čebulj	21 February 1992	(Italy) Altotevere San Giustino

== Turkey ==
The following is the Turkish roster in the 2013 Men's European Volleyball Championship.

Head coach:	Emanuele Zanini
Assistant:	Taner Atik

No.	Name	Date of birth	2013 club
1	Ulaş Kıyak	11 August 1981	(Turkey) Galatasaray Istanbul
2	Kemal Elgaz	1 January 1986	(Turkey) Galatasaray Istanbul
4	Metin Toy	3 May 1994	(Turkey) Fenerbahçe Istanbul
5	Hasan Yeşilbudak	11 January 1984	(Turkey) Arkas Izmir
6	Kemal Kayhan	2 January 1983	(Turkey) Fenerbahçe Istanbul
7	Can Ayvazoğlu	14 September 1979	(Turkey) Halkbank Ankara
10	Emre Batur	21 April 1988	(Turkey) Halkbank Ankara
11	Gökhan Gökgöz	6 January 1993	(Turkey) Arkas Izmir
12	Halil Yücel	24 November 1989	(Turkey) Halkbank Ankara
13	Emin Gök	15 February 1988	(Turkey) Arkas Izmir
15	Mustafa Koç	23 February 1992	(Turkey) Arkas Izmir
17	Murat Yenipazar	1 January 1993	(Turkey) İstanbul Büyükşehir Belediyesi
