= 2011 Men's European Volleyball League =

Tournament details
- Host country: Slovakia
- Dates: May 27 – July 10 (qualification); July 16/17 (final four)
- Teams: 12
- Venue: 1 (in 1 host city)

Final positions
- Champions: Slovakia (2nd title)

Tournament awards
- MVP: (Slovakia) Tomas Kmet

The 2011 Men's European Volleyball League was the eighth edition of the annual Men's European Volleyball League, which featured men's national volleyball teams from twelve European countries: Austria, Belgium, Belarus, Croatia, Great Britain, Greece, Netherlands, Romania, Slovakia, Slovenia, Spain, and Turkey. A preliminary league round was played from May 25 to July 10, and the final four tournament, which was held at Košice, Slovakia, on July 16.

During the league round, competing nations were drawn into three pools of four teams, and played each other in a double round-robin system, with two matches per leg in a total of six legs. Pool winners qualified for the final four round, joining the host team. If the final four host team finished first in its league round pool, the best pool runners-up qualified for the final four.

12 teams participated in this year's edition, which was a record field.

== Competing nations ==
- Austria
- Belgium
- Belarus
- Croatia
- Great Britain
- Greece
- Netherlands
- Romania
- Slovakia
- Slovenia
- Spain
- Turkey

== League round ==
=== Pool A ===
Pos	Team	Pld	W	L	Pts	SW	SL	SR	SPW	SPL	SPR	Qualification
1	Slovenia	12	9	3	26	28	16	1.750	1025	955	1.073	Final Four
2	Belgium	12	7	5	18	26	24	1.083	1106	1076	1.028	
3	Croatia	12	4	8	16	22	27	0.815	1036	1065	0.973	
4	Great Britain	12	4	8	12	19	28	0.679	995	1066	0.933	

==== Leg 1 ====
Date	Time		Score		Set 1	Set 2	Set 3	Set 4	Set 5	Total	Report
28 May	16:00	Great Britain	3–2	Croatia	21–25	21–25	26–24	25–18	15–4	108–96	Report
28 May	20:00	Belgium	1–3	Slovenia	22–25	25–19	18–25	23–25		88–94	Report
29 May	14:00	Belgium	1–3	Slovenia	19–25	20–25	25–20	17–25		81–95	Report
29 May	16:00	Great Britain	0–3	Croatia	18–25	21–25	15–25			54–75	Report

==== Leg 2 ====
Date	Time		Score		Set 1	Set 2	Set 3	Set 4	Set 5	Total	Report
4 Jun	18:00	Slovenia	3–0	Croatia	25–18	25–23	25–23			75–64	Report
4 Jun	20:00	Belgium	0–3	Great Britain	21–25	24–26	16–25			61–76	Report
5 Jun	14:00	Belgium	3–1	Great Britain	23–25	25–19	25–20	25–18		98–82	Report
5 Jun	18:00	Slovenia	3–2	Croatia	25–23	22–25	25–20	23–25	15–11	110–104	Report

==== Leg 3 ====
Date	Time		Score		Set 1	Set 2	Set 3	Set 4	Set 5	Total	Report
11 Jun	14:00	Great Britain	1–3	Slovenia	21–25	14–25	33–31	16–25		84–106	Report
11 Jun	17:30	Croatia	2–3	Belgium	25–20	30–32	13–25	25–20	13–15	106–112	Report
12 Jun	16:00	Great Britain	0–3	Slovenia	23–25	21–25	18–25			62–75	Report
{12 Jun	18:00	Croatia	0–3	'Belgium'	10–25	17–25	23–25			50–75	

==== Leg 4 ====
Date	Time		Score		Set 1	Set 2	Set 3	Set 4	Set 5	Total	Report
18 Jun	18:00	Slovenia	3–1	Great Britain	25–19	25–19	15–25	25–21		90–84	Report
18 Jun	20:00	Belgium	3–2	Croatia	25–20	19–25	25–20	22–25	15–11	106–101	Report
19 Jun	18:00	Slovenia	0–3	Great Britain	23–25	16–25	21–25			60–75	Report
19 Jun	18:30	Belgium	3–2	Croatia	25–15	25–23	23–25	22–25	15–9	110–97	Report

==== Leg 5 ====
Date	Time		Score		Set 1	Set 2	Set 3	Set 4	Set 5	Total	Report
24 Jun	14:00	Great Britain	2–3	Belgium	26–24	19–25	25–22	23–25	14–16	107–112	Report
24 Jun	19:30	Croatia	0–3	Slovenia	24–26	23–25	16–25			63–76	Report
25 Jun	16:00	Great Britain	3–2	Belgium	25–23	23–25	25–23	22–25	15–11	110–107	Report
25 Jun	20:15	Croatia	3–1	Slovenia	19–25	25–20	25–22	25–19		94–86	Report

==== Leg 6 ====
Date	Time		Score		Set 1	Set 2	Set 3	Set 4	Set 5	Total	Report
9 Jul	18:00	Slovenia	3–1	Belgium	22–25	25–17	25–23	25–16		97–81	Report
9 Jul	20:15	Croatia	3–0	Great Britain	25–22	25–19	25–20			75–61	Report
10 Jul	18:00	Slovenia	0–3	Belgium	19–25	22–25	20–25			61–75	Report
10 Jul	19:30	Croatia	3–2	Great Britain	25–19	23–25	23–25	25–13	15–10	111–92	Report

=== Pool B ===
Pos	Team	Pld	W	L	Pts	SW	SL	SR	SPW	SPL	SPR	Qualification
1	Spain	12	10	2	30	32	12	2.667	1054	951	1.108	Final Four
2	Netherlands	12	9	3	24	28	16	1.750	1025	956	1.072	
3	Greece	12	3	9	11	14	29	0.483	905	994	0.910	
4	Austria	12	2	10	7	14	31	0.452	980	1063	0.922	

==== Leg 1 ====
Date	Time		Score		Set 1	Set 2	Set 3	Set 4	Set 5	Total	Report
26 May	20:15	Austria	1–3	Greece	15–25	25–22	23–25	21–25		84–97	Report
27 May	19:30	Spain	0–3	Netherlands	22–25	22–25	27–29			71–79	Report
28 May	18:00	Spain	3–0	Netherlands	25–22	25–21	25–19			75–62	Report
28 May	20:15	Austria	1–3	Greece	25–19	22–25	22–25	24–26		93–95	Report

==== Leg 2 ====
Date	Time		Score		Set 1	Set 2	Set 3	Set 4	Set 5	Total	Report
3 Jun	19:30	Spain	3–1	Austria	25–20	22–25	25–21	25–17		97–83	Report
4 Jun	18:00	Spain	3–1	Austria	25–20	25–19	20–25	25–22		95–86	Report
4 Jun	20:00	Netherlands	3–2	Greece	25–19	23–25	25–18	21–25	15–11	109–98	Report
5 Jun	16:00	Netherlands	3–0	Greece	25–11	25–19	27–25			77–55	Report

==== Leg 3 ====
Date	Time		Score		Set 1	Set 2	Set 3	Set 4	Set 5	Total	Report
11 Jun	19:00	Netherlands	3–0	Austria	25–22	25–22	28–26			78–70	Report
11 Jun	19:00	Greece	1–3	Spain	25–23	23–25	21–25	20–25		89–98	Report
12 Jun	16:00	Netherlands	3–0	Austria	25–22	25–20	25–12			75–54	Report
12 Jun	19:00	Greece	0–3	Spain	18–25	18–25	21–25			57–75	Report

==== Leg 4 ====
Date	Time		Score		Set 1	Set 2	Set 3	Set 4	Set 5	Total	Report
17 Jun	20:30	Spain	3–0	Greece	25–19	25–22	25–19			75–60	Report
18 Jun	20:15	Austria	1–3	Netherlands	22–25	18–25	25–19	19–25		84–94	Report
18 Jun	20:30	Spain	3–0	Greece	27–25	25–14	25–22			77–61	Report
19 Jun	19:00	Austria	3–1	Netherlands	25–21	32–30	18–25	25–21		100–97	Report

==== Leg 5 ====
Date	Time		Score		Set 1	Set 2	Set 3	Set 4	Set 5	Total	Report
24 Jun	17:30	Austria	1–3	Spain	22–25	25–20	22–25	22–25		91–95	Report
25 Jun	19:00	Greece	0–3	Netherlands	21–25	18–25	21–25			60–75	Report
25 Jun	20:25	Austria	2–3	Spain	25–22	19–25	25–18	20–25	16–18	105–108	Report
26 Jun	19:00	Greece	2–3	Netherlands	23–25	25–18	25–18	18–25	10–15	101–101	Report

==== Leg 6 ====
Date	Time		Score		Set 1	Set 2	Set 3	Set 4	Set 5	Total	Report
9 Jul	19:00	Netherlands	3–2	Spain	21–25	25–22	25–22	19–25	18–16	108–110	Report
9 Jul	19:00	Greece	3–0	Austria	25–16	25–22	25–17			75–55	Report
10 Jul	16:00	Netherlands	0–3	Spain	23–25	26–28	21–25			70–78	Report
10 Jul	19:00	Greece	0–3	Austria	19–25	17–25	21–25			57–75	Report

=== Pool C ===
Pos	Team	Pld	W	L	Pts	SW	SL	SR	SPW	SPL	SPR	Qualification
1	Romania	12	8	4	24	27	16	1.688	1009	964	1.047	Final Four
2	Slovakia (Note: Qualified as hosts) (H)	12	8	4	23	28	19	1.474	1060	1009	1.051	Final Four
3	Belarus	12	5	7	17	22	24	0.917	1061	1049	1.011	
4	Turkey	12	3	9	8	13	31	0.419	919	1027	0.895	

(H) Host

==== Leg 1 ====
Date	Time		Score		Set 1	Set 2	Set 3	Set 4	Set 5	Total	Report
27 May	18:00	Romania	3–0	Slovakia	25–23	25–20	25–16			75–59	Report
28 May	15:30	Romania	1–3	Slovakia	23–25	25–18	21–25	23–25		92–93	Report
28 May	17:00	Turkey	1–3	Belarus	22–25	25–12	19–25	19–25		85–87	Report
29 May	17:00	Turkey	3–0	Belarus	27–25	28–26	25–23			80–74	Report

==== Leg 2 ====
Date	Time		Score		Set 1	Set 2	Set 3	Set 4	Set 5	Total	Report
4 Jun	16:00	Turkey	0–3	Romania	24–26	23–25	20–25			67–76	Report
4 Jun	19:00	Slovakia	3–2	Belarus	21–25	22–25	25–20	25–18	15–13	108–101	Report
5 Jun	17:00	Turkey	1–3	Romania	21–25	20–25	26–24	18–25		85–99	Report
5 Jun	19:00	Slovakia	3–1	Belarus	29–31	25–23	25–22	25–20		104–96	Report

==== Leg 3 ====
Date	Time		Score		Set 1	Set 2	Set 3	Set 4	Set 5	Total	Report
10 Jun	19:30	Turkey	3–2	Slovakia	25–17	17–25	23–25	25–23	15–9	105–99	Report
11 Jun	19:30	Belarus	1–3	Romania	23–25	23–25	27–25	23–25		96–100	Report
11 Jun	19:30	Turkey	0–3	Slovakia	17–25	23–25	21–25			61–75	Report
12 Jun	19:30	Belarus	3–1	Romania	25–20	17–25	25–21	25–21		92–87	Report

==== Leg 4 ====
Date	Time		Score		Set 1	Set 2	Set 3	Set 4	Set 5	Total	Report
17 Jun	18:00	Romania	3–0	Turkey	25–23	25–22	26–24			76–69	Report
18 Jun	18:00	Romania	3–0	Turkey	25–15	25–16	25–21			75–52	Report
18 Jun	19:00	Belarus	0–3	Slovakia	18–25	23–25	20–25			61–75	Report
19 Jun	19:00	Belarus	3–1	Slovakia	25–22	25–19	23–25	25–20		98–86	Report

==== Leg 5 ====
Date	Time		Score		Set 1	Set 2	Set 3	Set 4	Set 5	Total	Report
25 Jun	19:00	Slovakia	3–1	Romania	25–15	25–19	22–25	25–16		97–75	Report
25 Jun	19:30	Belarus	2–3	Turkey	25–20	25–22	18–25	23–25	19–21	110–113	Report
26 Jun	19:00	Slovakia	1–3	Romania	23–25	25–22	17–25	18–25		83–97	Report
26 Jun	19:30	Belarus	3–0	Turkey	25–19	25–19	25–20			75–58	Report

==== Leg 6 ====
Date	Time		Score		Set 1	Set 2	Set 3	Set 4	Set 5	Total	Report
8 Jul	18:00	Romania	3–1	Belarus	23–25	28–26	25–21	26–24		102–96	Report
9 Jul	18:00	Romania	0–3	Belarus	19–25	16–25	20–25			55–75	Report
9 Jul	19:00	Slovakia	3–0	Turkey	25–18	25–15	25–22			75–55	Report
10 Jul	19:00	Slovakia	3–2	Turkey	22–25	19–25	25–13	25–23	15–7	106–93	Report

== Final four ==
The final four was held at Košice, Slovakia on July 16/17, 2011.

Semi-finals
July 16 – Košice
Slovenia	2
Spain	3
July 16 – Košice
Slovakia	3
Romania	0

Final
July 17 – Košice
Spain	2
Slovakia	3
3rd place
July 17 – Košice
Slovenia	3
Romania	0

=== Semifinals ===
Date	Time		Score		Set 1	Set 2	Set 3	Set 4	Set 5	Total	Report
16 Jul	16:00	Slovenia	2–3	Spain	24–26	25–23	25–19	17–25	12–15	103–108	Report
16 Jul	19:00	Slovakia	3–0	Romania	25–14	28–26	25–19			78–59	Report

=== Bronze medal match ===
Date	Time		Score		Set 1	Set 2	Set 3	Set 4	Set 5	Total	Report
17 Jul	16:00	Slovenia	3–0	Romania	25–20	25–18	25–22			75–60	Report

=== Final ===
Date	Time		Score		Set 1	Set 2	Set 3	Set 4	Set 5	Total	Report
17 Jul	19:00	Spain	2–3	Slovakia	22–25	25–22	26–24	22–25	12–15	107–111	Report

== Final standing ==
Rank	Team
1st place, gold medalist(s)	Slovakia
2nd place, silver medalist(s)	Spain
3rd place, bronze medalist(s)	Slovenia
4	Romania
5	Netherlands
6	Belgium
7	Belarus
8	Croatia
9	Greece
10	Great Britain
11	Turkey
12	Austria

2011 European League champions

Slovakia
2nd title

15-man Roster for Final Round
Milan Bencz, Michal Masný, Emanuel Kohút, Marek Mikula, Matej Kubš, Róbert Hupka, Martin Sopko, Roman Ondrušek, Tibor Filo, Štefan Chrtiansky, Tomáš Kmeť, Juraj Zaťko, Tomáš Hollý, Lukáš Diviš, Peter Michalovič
Head coach
Emanuele Zanini

== Awards ==
- Most valuable player
  (Slovakia) Tomáš Kmeť
- Best scorer
  (Spain) Sergio Noda
- Best spiker
  (Spain) Sergio Noda
- Best blocker
  (Slovakia) Tomáš Kmeť
- Best server
  (Slovenia) Alen Pajenk
- Best setter
  (Slovakia) Michal Masný
- Best receiver
  (Spain) Francesc Llenas
- Best libero
  (Slovakia) Roman Ondrušek
