= Slovakia men's national volleyball team =

Men's national volleyball team representing Slovakia

Slovakia
- Nickname(s): Repre
- Association: SVF
- Confederation: CEV
- Head coach: Michal Masný
- FIVB ranking: 51 ▼9 (15 October 2026)

Uniforms
Home	Away

First international
- Slovakia - Belarus 1:3 (7 May 1993)

Summer Olympics
- Appearances: none

World Championship
- Appearances: none

World Cup
- Appearances: none

European Championship
- Appearances: 11 (First in 1997)
- Best result: 5th - Quarterfinals (2011)
- www.svf.sk (in Slovak)
Honours
European League
Gold medal – first place	2008 Turkey
Gold medal – first place	2011 Slovakia
Bronze medal – third place	2007 Portugal

The Slovakia men's national volleyball team represents Slovakia in international volleyball competitions and friendly matches. It is governed by the Slovak Volleyball Federation.

== Competition record ==
=== European Championship ===
Champions Runners-up Third place Fourth place

Year	Round	Position	Pld	W	L	SW	SL	Squad
1948–1993	As part of Czechoslovakia							
(Greece) 1995	Did not qualify							
(Netherlands) 1997	Seventh Place Match	8th	7	3	4	10	16	Squad
(Austria) 1999	Did not qualify							
(Czech Republic) 2001	Preliminary Round	9th	5	1	4	5	14	Squad
(Germany) 2003	Preliminary Round	12th	5	0	5	3	15	Squad
(Serbia and Montenegro) / (Italy) 2005	Did not qualify							
(Russia) 2007	Second Round	12th	6	1	5	5	16	Squad
(Turkey) 2009	Second Round	11th	6	1	5	11	15	Squad
(Austria) / (Czech Republic) 2011	Quarterfinals	5th	4	3	1	9	7	Squad
(Denmark) / (Poland) 2013	Second Round	11th	4	1	3	4	11	Squad
(Bulgaria) / (Italy) 2015	Preliminary Round	14th	3	0	3	2	9	Squad
(Poland) 2017	Preliminary Round	15th	3	0	3	1	9	Squad
(Belgium) / (France) / (Netherlands) / (Slovenia) 2019	Preliminary Round	19th	5	2	3	6	12	Squad
(Poland) / (Czech Republic) / (Estonia) / (Finland) 2021	Preliminary Round	19th	5	1	4	8	14	Squad
(Italy) / (Bulgaria) / (North Macedonia) / (Israel) 2023	Did not qualify							
(Bulgaria) / (Finland) / (Italy) / (Romania) 2026	Preliminary Round	24th	5	0	5	3	15	Squad
(Montenegro) 2028	To be determined							
Total	Qualified: 11/16		53	13	40	64	138	—

=== European Games ===
Champions Runners-up Third place Fourth place

Year	Round	Position	Pld	W	L	SW	SL	Squad
(Azerbaijan) 2015	Quarterfinals	5th	6	2	3	7	14	Squad
Total	Qualified: 1/1		6	2	3	7	14	—

=== World League ===
World League record
Year	Round	Position	Pld	W	L	SW	SL	Squad
(Brazil) 1993	Did not qualify							
(Italy) 1994	Did not qualify							
(Brazil) 1995	Did not qualify							
(Netherlands) 1996	Did not qualify							
(Russia) 1997	Did not qualify							
(Italy) 1998	Did not qualify							
(Argentina) 1999	Did not qualify							
(Netherlands) 2000	Did not qualify							
(Poland) 2001	Did not qualify							
(Brazil) 2002	Did not qualify							
(Spain) 2003	Did not qualify							
(Italy) 2004	Did not qualify							
(Serbia and Montenegro) 2005	Did not qualify							
(Russia) 2006	Did not qualify							
(Poland) 2007	Did not qualify							
(Brazil) 2008	Did not qualify							
(Serbia) 2009	Did not qualify							
(Argentina) 2010	Did not qualify							
(Poland) 2011	Did not qualify							
(Bulgaria) 2012	Did not qualify							
(Argentina) 2013	Did not qualify							
(Italy) 2014	G3 FR	24th	8	3	5	15	17	Squad
(Brazil) 2015	G3 FR	23rd	8	3	5	18	18	Squad
(Poland) 2016	G2 GS	21st	9	3	6	15	22	Squad
(Brazil) 2017	G2 GS	19th	9	4	5	14	17	Squad
Total	Competed: 4/25		34	13	21	62	74	—

=== European League ===
Year	Round	Position	Pld	W	L
(Czech Republic) 2004	League Round	8th	12	1	11
(Russia) 2005	League Round	6th	12	5	7
(Turkey) 2006	League Round	7th	12	2	10
(Portugal) 2007	Final Four	Bronze	14	11	3
(Turkey) 2008	Final	Champions	14	10	4
(Portugal) 2009	Final Four	4th	14	9	5
(Spain) 2010	League Round	6th	12	5	7
(Slovakia) 2011	Final	Champions	14	10	4
(Turkey) 2012	Final Four	4th	14	7	7
(Turkey) 2013	League Round	7th	12	6	6
(Montenegro) 2014	Did not enter				
(Poland) 2015	Did not enter				
(Bulgaria) 2016	Did not enter				
(Denmark) 2017	Did not enter				
(Czech Republic) 2018	League Round	11th	6	1	5
(Estonia) 2019	League Round	8th	6	2	4
(Belgium) 2021	League Round	7th	4	1	3
(Croatia) 2022	League Round	7th	4	0	4
(Croatia) 2023	League Round	12th	6	1	5
(Croatia) 2024	Did not enter				
(Czech Republic) 2025	League Round	8th	6	2	4
(Finland) (Netherlands) 2026	League Round	14th	6	3	3
Total	17/22	2 Titles	168	76	92

== Current squad ==
The following is the Slovak roster in the 2017 Men's European Volleyball Championship.

Head coach:	Andrej Kravarik
Assistants:

No.	Name	Date of birth	Height	Weight	Spike	Block	2016–17 club
1	Milan Bencz	5 September 1987	2.06 m (6 ft 9 in)	99 kg (218 lb)	363 cm (143 in)	342 cm (135 in)	(France) Narbonne
3	Emanuel Kohút (C)	21 July 1982	2.06 m (6 ft 9 in)	97 kg (214 lb)	359 cm (141 in)	345 cm (136 in)	(Poland) GKS Katowice
4	Peter Ondrovič	28 March 1995	1.99 m (6 ft 6 in)	95 kg (209 lb)	347 cm (137 in)	325 cm (128 in)	(Germany) Herrsching
5	Matej Kubš	26 May 1988	1.88 m (6 ft 2 in)	82 kg (181 lb)	341 cm (134 in)	315 cm (124 in)	(Slovakia) Bystrina SPU Nitra
8	Daniel Končal	16 September 1982	1.88 m (6 ft 2 in)	84 kg (185 lb)	319 cm (126 in)	300 cm (120 in)	(Czech Republic) Karlovarsko
9	Peter Mlynarčík	29 November 1991	2.00 m (6 ft 7 in)	98 kg (216 lb)	350 cm (140 in)	330 cm (130 in)	(Austria) Aich-Dob
10	Marcel Lux	27 July 1994	2.00 m (6 ft 7 in)	92 kg (203 lb)	341 cm (134 in)	315 cm (124 in)	(Slovakia) Mirad Prešov
11	Martin Turis	27 August 1993	1.81 m (5 ft 11 in)	83 kg (183 lb)	325 cm (128 in)	310 cm (120 in)	(Slovakia) Bystrina SPU Nitra
12	Matej Paták	8 June 1990	1.97 m (6 ft 6 in)	88 kg (194 lb)	353 cm (139 in)	330 cm (130 in)	(France) Chaumont 52
13	Štefan Chrtianský	17 August 1989	2.07 m (6 ft 9 in)	97 kg (214 lb)	350 cm (140 in)	335 cm (132 in)	(Austria) Hypo Tirol Innsbruck
15	Juraj Zaťko	5 June 1987	1.92 m (6 ft 4 in)	87 kg (192 lb)	347 cm (137 in)	320 cm (130 in)	(Slovakia) Bystrina SPU Nitra
16	Radoslav Prešinský	14 January 1989	2.06 m (6 ft 9 in)	100 kg (220 lb)	345 cm (136 in)	327 cm (129 in)	(Czech Republic) Aero Odolena Voda

== See also ==
- Czechoslovakia men's national volleyball team
- Slovakia women's national volleyball team
