= Slovak Women's Volleyball Cup =

Volleyball in Slovakia

- Sport: Volleyball
- Founded: 1993
- Administrator: SVF
- Country: Slovakia
- Continent: Europe
- Most recent champion: UKF Nitra (1st title)
- Most titles: VK Slávia EU Bratislava (15 titles)
- Website: http://www.svf.sk/sk/titulna-stranka

The Slovak Women's National Volleyball Cup is the Official women's volleyball cup competition in Slovakia, First edition started in 1993 under the rule of the Slovak Volleyball Federation (SVF), The competition formule is a playoffs home and away combined score.

== Winners list ==
Years	Winners	Score	Runners-up
1993	Slávia UK Bratislava		
1994	Slávia UK Bratislava		SPASA Žilina
1995	Slávia UK Bratislava		SPASA Žilina
1996	Slávia UK Bratislava		SPASA Žilina
1997-02	Competition Not Disputed		
2003	Slávia UK Bratislava		MŠK Žiar nad Hronom
2004	Slávia UK Bratislava		OMS Senica
2005	Slávia UK SS Bratislava		VK Doprastav Bratislava
2006	Slávia UK SS Bratislava		VTC Pezinok
2007	OMS Senica	3 - 1 (23-25, 25-18, 25-18, 25-18)	Slávia UK Bratislava
2008	VK Doprastav Bratislava	3 - 0 (26-24, 25-21, 25-19)	Slávia UK Kúpele Dudince Bratislava
2009	VK Doprastav Bratislava	3 - 1 (19-25, 25-21, 25-9, 25-18)	Slávia UK Bratislava
2010	Slávia UK Bratislava	3 - 1 (25-19, 24-26, 25-17, 25-18)	VK Doprastav Bratislava
2011	VK Doprastav Bratislava	3 - 0 (25-19, 25-20, 25-23)	VK Slávia EU Bratislava
2012	VK Doprastav Bratislava	3 - 1 (25-22, 21-25, 25-19, 25-23)	VK Slávia EU Bratislava
2013	VK Slávia EU Bratislava	3 - 1 (22-25, 25-17, 25-22, 25-16)	VK Doprastav Bratislava
2014	VK Doprastav Bratislava	3 - 0 (25-21, 25-16, 29-27)	VK Slávia EU Bratislava
2015	VK Slávia EU Bratislava	3 - 1 (21-25, 25-7, 25-21, 27-25)	VK Spišská Nová Ves
2016	VK Slávia EU Bratislava	3 - 1 (25-21, 23-25, 25-12, 25-23)	KV MŠK OKTAN Kežmarok
2017	VK Slávia EU Bratislava	3 - 0 (25-17, 25-14, 25-15)	UKF Nitra
2018	Strabag Volleyball Club FTVŠ UK Bratislava	3 - 1 (25-20, 25-16, 20-25, 25-22)	UKF Nitra
2019	VK Slávia EU Bratislava	3 - 2 (25-22, 25-20, 14-25, 26-28, 15-12)	Strabag Volleyball Club FTVŠ UK Bratislava
2020	Strabag VC Bilíkova Pezinok	3 - 2 (25-17, 23-25, 20-25, 25-21, 15,7)	VK Slávia EU Bratislava

== Honours by club ==
Rk	Club	Years won
1.	VK Slávia EU Bratislava	15 (1993–1996), (2003–2006), 2010, 2013, (2015–2017), 2019, 2021.
2.	Strabag FTVŠ UK Bratislava	6 (2008–2009), (2011–2012), 2014, 2018.
3.	UKF Nitra	1 2022
4.	Strabag VC Bilíkova Pezinok	1 2020
5.	SVK Senica	1 2007
