= Václav Kopáček =

Czech volleyball player (born 1982)

Vaclav Kopacek
Personal information
- Nationality: Czech
- Born: 21 October 1982 (age 44)
- Height: 182 cm (6 ft 0 in)
- Weight: 80 kg (176 lb)
- Spike: 314 cm (124 in)
- Block: 298 cm (117 in)

Volleyball information
- Number: 22 (national team)

Career
- Years: Team
- 2014: VK Dukla Liberec

National team
- Years: Team
- 2014: Czech Republic

Vaclav Kopacek (born 21 October 1982) is a former Czech male volleyball player. He was part of the Czech Republic men's national volleyball team. On the club level, he played for VK Dukla Liberec.
