= Michal Masný =

Slovak volleyball player and coach (born 1979)

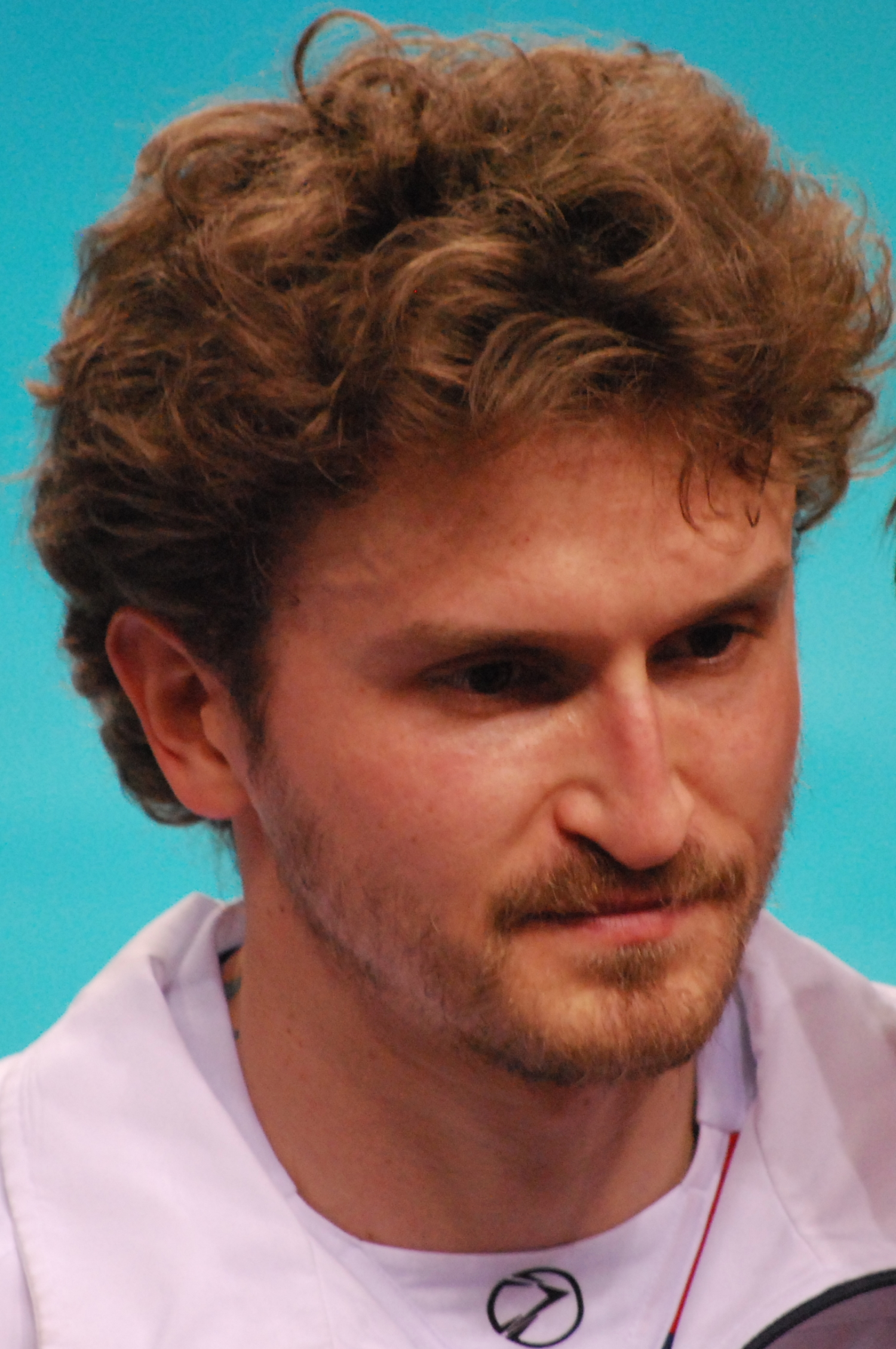

Personal information
- Nationality: Slovak; Polish
- Born: 14 August 1979 (age 47); Žilina, Czechoslovakia
- Height: 1.82 m (6 ft 0 in)

Coaching information
- Current team: BKS Visła Bydgoszcz
Previous teams coached
Years	Teams
2022–	BKS Visła Bydgoszcz

Volleyball information
- Position: Setter

Career
Years	Teams
1998–2000; 2000–2002; 2002–2003; 2003–2005; 2005–2006; 2007–2008; 2008–2010; 2010–2013; 2013–2016; 2016–2017; 2017–2018; 2018–2020; 2020–2022	MVK Lokomotíva Zvolen; VKM Žilina; Hypo Tirol Innsbruck; VK Kladno; VK Opava; Płomień Sosnowiec; ZAKSA Kędzierzyn-Koźle; Delecta Bydgoszcz; Jastrzębski Węgiel; Trefl Gdańsk; Cuprum Lubin; Warta Zawiercie; BKS Visła Bydgoszcz

National team
2003–2015	Slovakia
Honours
Men's volleyball
Representing Slovakia
European League
Gold medal – first place	2008 Turkey
Gold medal – first place	2011 Slovakia
Bronze medal – third place	2007 Portugal

Michal Masný (born 14 August 1979) is a Slovak professional volleyball coach and former player, a former member of the Slovakia national team. He currently serves as head coach for BKS Visła Bydgoszcz.

== Career ==
=== Clubs ===
He was a runner-up in Austrian Volley League in 2003 with his team Hypo Tirol Innsbruck. In 2004 he won the Czech Volleyball League title. With Jastrzębski Węgiel he won a bronze medal in 2013–14 CEV Champions League by defeating Zenit Kazan and the PlusLiga bronze medal in the same year. He became a member of Polish club Aluron Virtu Warta Zawiercie in 2018.

=== National team ===
He is a member of Slovakia men's national volleyball team since 2003, participated in 2003 Men's European Volleyball Championship. In 2008 and 2011 he won two Men's European Volleyball League gold medals and achieved 3rd place in 2007. He was named the best setter in 2007 Men's European Volleyball League and 2011. In 2008 and 2009 he was named the best volleyball player in Slovakia.

== Honours ==
=== Clubs ===
- National championships
  - 2002/2003 Austrian Championship, with Hypo Tirol Innsbruck
  - 2003/2004 Czech Championship, with Chance Odolena Voda
  - 2004/2005 Czech Championship, with Chance Odolena Voda

=== Individual awards ===
- 2004: Czech Championship – Best Setter
- 2004: Czech Championship – Best Setter
- 2005: Czech Championship – Best Setter
- 2007: European League – Best Setter
- 2008: Best volleyball player in Slovakia
- 2009: Best volleyball player in Slovakia
- 2011: European League – Best Setter
- 2014: Polish Cup – Best Setter
