= Noah Baxpöhler =

German volleyball player (born 1993)

Personal information
- Nationality: German
- Born: August 13, 1993 (age 33); Ahlen, Germany
- Height: 2.10 m (6 ft 11 in)
- Weight: 90 kg (198 lb)
- Spike: 345 cm (136 in)
- Block: 330 cm (130 in)

Volleyball information
- Position: Middle blocker
- Current club: SVG Lüneburg

National team
Germany
Honours
European Championship
Silver medal – second place	2017 Poland

Noah Baxpöhler (born 13 August 1993) is a German volleyball player for SVG Lüneburg and the German national team.

He participated at the 2017 Men's European Volleyball Championship.

== Sporting achievements ==
=== National team ===
- 2017 European Championship
