= Marcel Lux =

Slovak volleyball player (born 1994)

Personal information
- Nationality: Slovak
- Born: 27 July 1994 (age 32); Prešov, Slovakia
- Height: 2.00 m (6 ft 7 in)
- Weight: 92 kg (203 lb)
- Spike: 349 cm (137 in)
- Block: 330 cm (130 in)

Volleyball information
- Position: Outside spiker
- Current club: VK Mirad UNIPO Prešov
- Number: 4

National team
Slovakia

Marcel Lux (born 27 July 1994) is a Slovak volleyball player who is known for playing with VK Mirad PU Prešov and the Slovak national team.

He participated at the 2017 Men's European Volleyball Championship.
