= Peter Ondrovič =

Slovak volleyball player (born 1995)

Personal information
- Nationality: Slovak
- Born: 28 March 1995 (age 31)
- Height: 1.99 m (6 ft 6 in)
- Weight: 95 kg (209 lb)
- Spike: 347 cm (137 in)
- Block: 325 cm (128 in)

Volleyball information
- Position: Middle blocker
- Current club: TSV Herrsching

Career
Years	Teams
	COP Volley Trenčín; TSV Herrsching

National team
2015–	Slovakia

Peter Ondrovič (born 28 March 1995) is a Slovak male volleyball player. He is part of the Slovakia men's national volleyball team. He competed at the 2015 European Games in Baku. On club level he plays for TSV Herrsching.
