= Daniel Končal =

Slovak volleyball player

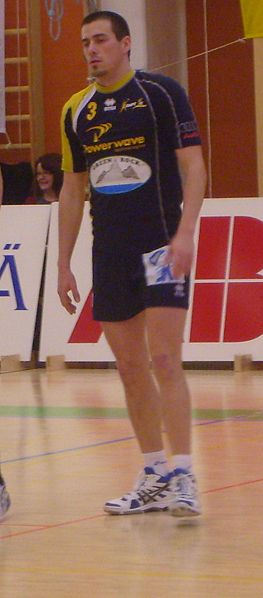

Personal information
- Nationality: Slovak
- Born: 16 September 1982 (age 44)
- Height: 1.88 m (6 ft 2 in)
- Weight: 84 kg (185 lb)
- Spike: 319 cm (126 in)
- Block: 300 cm (118 in)

Volleyball information
- Position: Setter
- Current club: VK Karlovarsko

National team
Slovakia

Daniel Končal (born 16 September 1982) is a Slovak volleyball player for VK Karlovarsko and the Slovak national team.

He participated at the 2017 Men's European Volleyball Championship.
