= Slovak Volleyball Federation =

Governing body for volleyball in Slovakia

- Sport: Volleyball; Beach volleyball
- Jurisdiction: Slovakia
- Abbreviation: SVF
- Founded: 1993
- Affiliation: FIVB
- Affiliation date: 1993
- Headquarters: Bratislava
- Location: Slovakia
- President: Marek Rojko

Official website
- www.svf.sk
- (Slovakia)

The Slovak Volleyball Federation (Slovak: Slovenská Volejbalová Federácia, SVF), is the governing body for Volleyball in Slovakia since 1993.

== History ==
The Slovak Federation has been recognised by FIVB from 1993 and is a member of Confédération Européenne de Volleyball.

== Presidents ==
President	From	To
Dušan Mešár	1993	2000
Ivan Majerčák	2000	2004
Miroslav Kováčik	2004	2005
Ľubor Halanda	2005	2017
Martin Kraščenič	2017	2021
Marek Rojko	2021	reigning

== See also ==
- Slovakia men's national volleyball team
- Slovakia women's national volleyball team
