= Marek Zmhral =

Czech volleyball player (born 1993)

Personal information
- Nationality: Czech
- Born: 10 August 1993 (age 33)
- Height: 2.03 m (6 ft 8 in)
- Weight: 92 kg (203 lb)
- Spike: 348 cm (137 in)
- Block: 328 cm (129 in)

Volleyball information
- Position: Outside spiker
- Current club: Volejbal Brno

National team
Czech Republic

Marek Zmhral (born 10 August 1993) is a Czech volleyball player for Volejbal Brno and the Czech national team.

He participated at the 2017 Men's European Volleyball Championship.
