= Markus Kaurto =

Finnish volleyball player (born 1993)

Personal information
- Nationality: Finnish
- Born: 31 August 1993 (age 33)
- Height: 1.96 m (6 ft 5 in)
- Weight: 85 kg (187 lb)
- Spike: 345 cm (136 in)
- Block: 320 cm (126 in)

Volleyball information
- Position: Middle blocker
- Current club: Lentopalloseura ETTA

Career
Years	Teams
	Pojat Rovaniemi; Lentopalloseura ETTA

National team
2015–	Finland

Markus Kaurto (born 31 August 1993) is a Finnish male volleyball player. He is part of the Finland men's national volleyball team. He competed at the 2015 European Games in Baku. On club level he plays for Lentopalloseura ETTA.
