= Gert Van Walle =

Belgian volleyball player (born 1987)

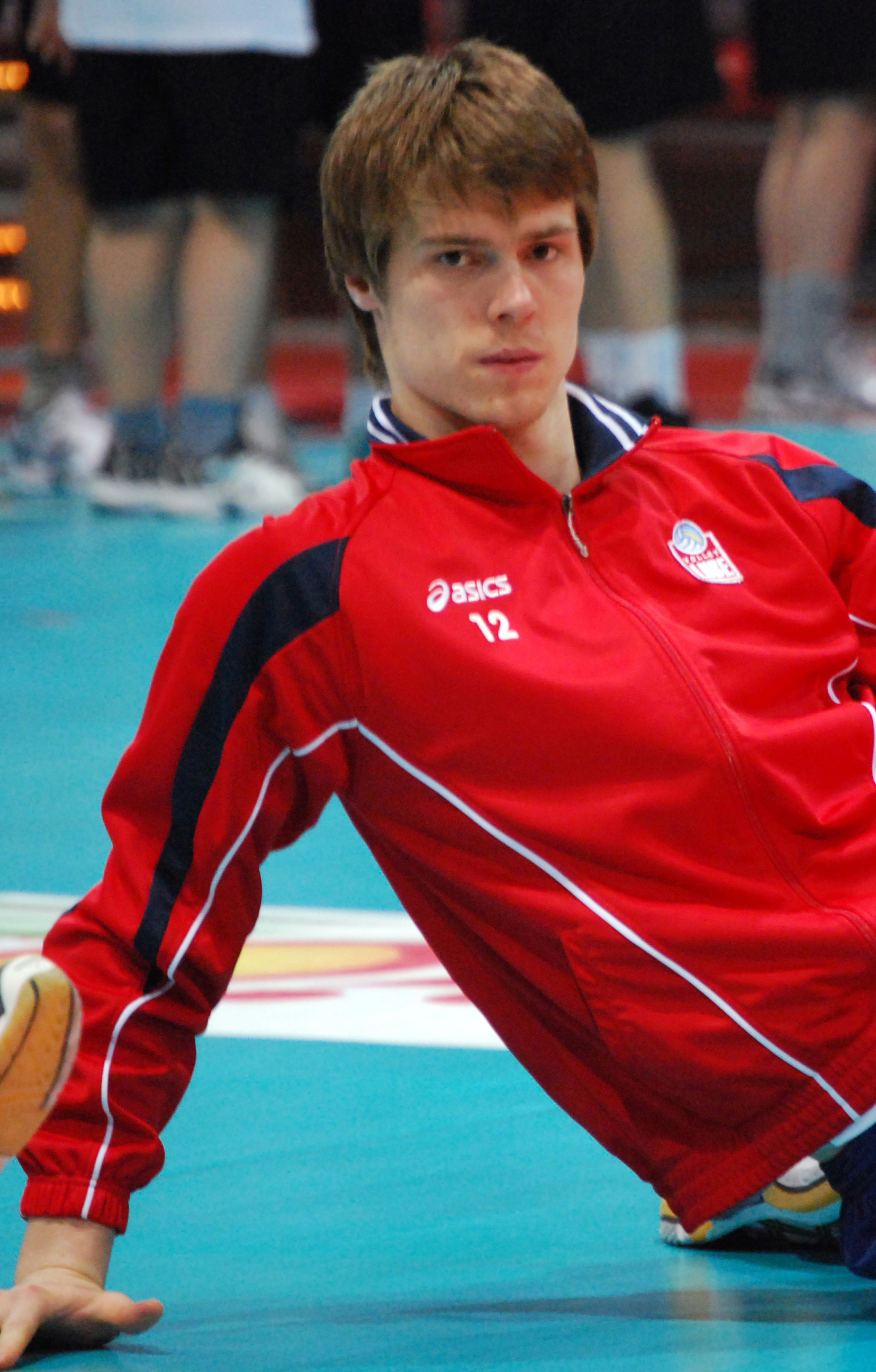

Personal information
- Nationality: Belgian
- Born: 7 August 1987 (age 39); Ekeren, Belgium
- Height: 1.97 m (6 ft 6 in)
- Weight: 91 kg (201 lb)
- Spike: 350 cm (138 in)
- Block: 318 cm (125 in)

Volleyball information
- Position: Opposite
- Current club: Volley Guibertin
- Number: 12

Career
Teams
	Altotevere Città di Castello; Beauvais Oise UC; GKS Katowice

National team
2014–	Belgium

Gert Van Walle (born 7 August 1987) is a Belgian professional male volleyball player. He was part of the Belgium men's national volleyball team at the 2014 FIVB Volleyball Men's World Championship in Poland. He played for Altotevere Città di Castello and French club Beauvais.
