= Aleš Holubec =

Czech volleyball player (born 1984)

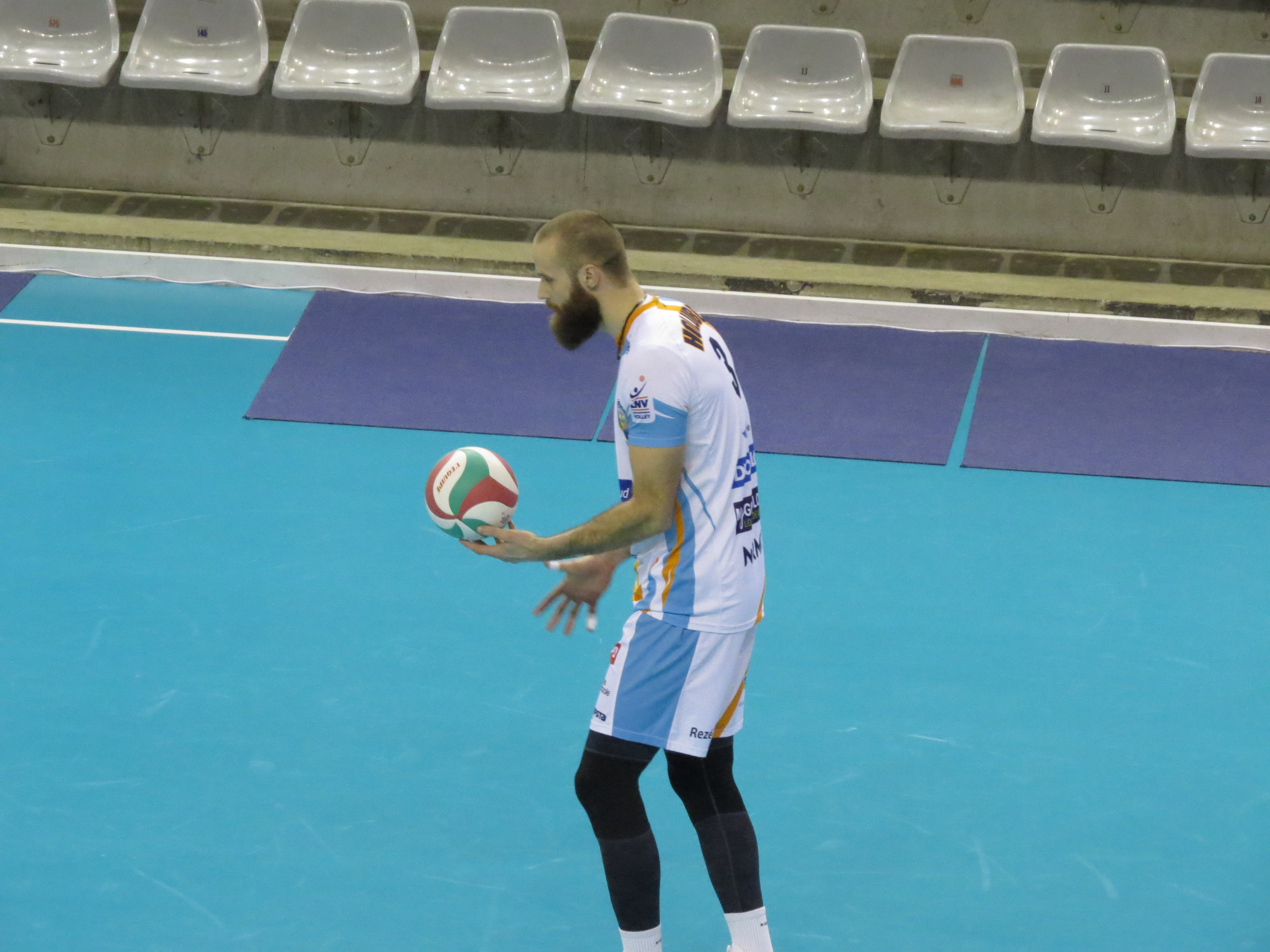

Personal information
- Nationality: Czech
- Born: 13 March 1984 (age 42); Opava, Czechoslovakia
- Height: 1.99 m (6 ft 6 in)
- Weight: 90 kg (198 lb)
- Spike: 357 cm (141 in)
- Block: 335 cm (132 in)

Volleyball information
- Position: Middle blocker
- Current club: Slavia HK
- Number: 7

Career
| Years | Teams |
|---|---|
| 2010– | Nantes Rezé Métropole Volley |

National team
| 2010– | Czech Republic |

Aleš Holubec (born 13 March 1984) is a Czech male volleyball player. He was part of the Czech Republic men's national volleyball team at the 2010 FIVB Volleyball Men's World Championship in Italy. He plays for Nantes Rezé Métropole.
