= Andrej Kravárik =

Slovak-Greek volleyball player and coach

Personal information
- Full name: Andrej Kravárik
- Nickname: Boco
- Nationality: Slovak; Greek
- Born: 28 July 1971 (age 55) Piešťany, Czechoslovakia
- Height: 2.04 m (6 ft 8 in)
- Weight: 96 kg (212 lb)
- Spike: 3.60 m (142 in)
- Block: 3.50 m (138 in)

Coaching information
- Previous teams coached
- Years: Teams
- 2012–2013 2013 2015–2017 2017–2020 2018–2019 2020–2021 2021–2022: Iraklis Thessaloniki; Aris Thessaloniki; Nestor Thessaloniki; Slovakia; Pegasus Polichni; Apollon Kalamaria; Iraklis Thessaloniki

Volleyball information
- Position: Opposite/Middle blocker

Career
- Years: Team
- 1991–1994 1994–1995 1995–1996 1996–1997 1997–1998 1998–1999 1999–2012: Slovan Bratislava; PAOK; Ethnikos Alexandroupolis; Iraklis Thessaloniki; Aris Thessaloniki; Gabeca; Iraklis Thessaloniki

National team
- Years: Team
- 1995–2002 2004–2007: Slovakia; Greece
- Updated on November 21, 2026

Andrej Kravárik (born 28 July 1971) is a Slovak-Greek former volleyball player and current coach. He spent the biggest part of his playing career at Iraklis Thessaloniki, where he enjoyed great success. He was also coach of the Slovakia men's national volleyball team.

== Personal life ==
Kravárik is married with Maya, who is also a volleyball player. They have a daughter, Michaela (born in 1997), currently a member of Iraklis women's volleyball team.

His father is Jaroslav Kravárik, a former footballer, who played for Spartak Trnava and the Czechoslovakia national team.

== Awards ==
=== Individual ===
- 2000 Greek Cup "Most Valuable Player"
- 2001 Greek Championship "Most Valuable Player"
- 2001–02 CEV Indesit Champions League Final Four "Best Blocker"
- 2012 Greek Championship "Most Valuable Player"

=== Club ===
- 1993 Slovak Championship - Champion, with VKP Bratislava
- 1994 Slovak Championship - Champion, with VKP Bratislava
- 1997 Greek Super Cup - Champion, with Aris Thessaloniki
- 2000 Greek Cup - Champion, with Iraklis Thessaloniki
- 2002 Greek Cup - Champion, with Iraklis Thessaloniki
- 2002 Greek Championship - Champion, with Iraklis Thessaloniki
- 2004 Greek Cup - Champion, with Iraklis Thessaloniki
- 2004 Greek Super Cup - Champion, with Iraklis Thessaloniki
- 2004–05 CEV Champions League – Runner-up, with Iraklis Thessaloniki
- 2005 Greek Cup - Champion, with Iraklis Thessaloniki
- 2005 Greek Championship - Champion, with Iraklis Thessaloniki
- 2005 Greek Super Cup - Champion, with Iraklis Thessaloniki
- 2005–06 CEV Champions League – Runner-up, with Iraklis Thessaloniki
- 2006 Greek Cup - Champion, with Iraklis Thessaloniki
- 2007 Greek Championship - Champion, with Iraklis Thessaloniki
- 2007 Greek Super Cup - Champion, with Iraklis Thessaloniki
- 2008 Greek Championship - Champion, with Iraklis Thessaloniki
- 2008 Greek Super Cup - Champion, with Iraklis Thessaloniki
- 2008–09 CEV Champions League – Runner-up, with Iraklis Thessaloniki
- 2012 Greek Cup - Champion, with Iraklis Thessaloniki
- 2012 Greek Championship - Champion, with Iraklis Thessaloniki

=== National team ===
==== Slovakia ====
- 1997 European Championship - 8th place

==== Greece ====
- 2004 FIVB World League - 5th place
- 2004 Summer Olympics - 5th place
