= Alen Pajenk =

Slovenian volleyball player (born 1986)

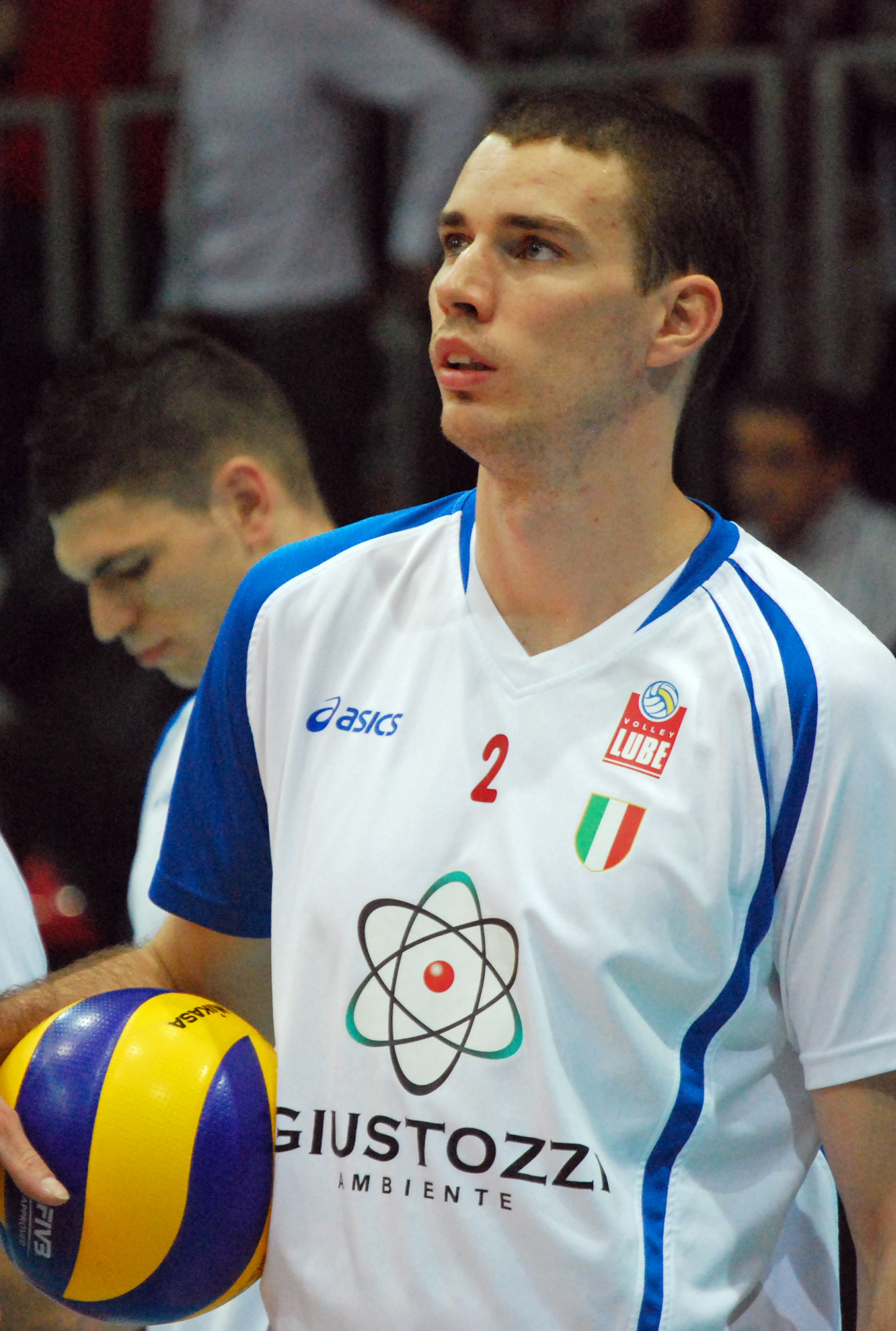
- Pajenk in 2013

Personal information
- Nationality: Slovenian
- Born: 23 April 1986 (age 40) Maribor, SFR Yugoslavia
- Height: 2.03 m (6 ft 8 in)
- Weight: 93 kg (205 lb)
- Spike: 357 cm (141 in)
- Block: 330 cm (130 in)

Volleyball information
- Position: Middle blocker
- Current club: ACH Volley

Career
- Years: Team
- 2003–2007 2007–2010 2010–2011 2011–2013 2013–2015 2015–2017 2017–2018 2018–2020 2020–2021 2021–2025 2025–: OK Maribor; ACH Volley; BluVolley Verona; Volley Lube; Jastrzębski Węgiel; Fenerbahçe İstanbul; BluVolley Verona; Czarni Radom; Stade Poitevin Poitiers; Olympiacos Praeus; ACH Volley

National team
- Years: Team
- 2008–: Slovenia
Honours
Men's volleyball
Representing Slovenia
FIVB Nations League
Bronze medal – third place	2026 China
FIVB Challenger Cup
Gold medal – first place	2019 Slovenia
CEV European Championship
Silver medal – second place	2015 Bulgaria/Italy
Silver medal – second place	2019 France/Slovenia/Belgium/Netherlands
Silver medal – second place	2021 Poland/Czech Republic/Estonia/Finland
Bronze medal – third place	2023 Italy/Bulgaria/North Macedonia/Israel
European League
Gold medal – first place	2015 Poland
Bronze medal – third place	2011 Slovakia
Mediterranean Games
Bronze medal – third place	2009 Pescara

Alen Pajenk (born 23 April 1986) is a Slovenian volleyball player who plays for ACH Volley and the Slovenia national team. With Slovenia, he was the runner-up of the European Volleyball Championship three times, in 2015, 2019 and 2021.

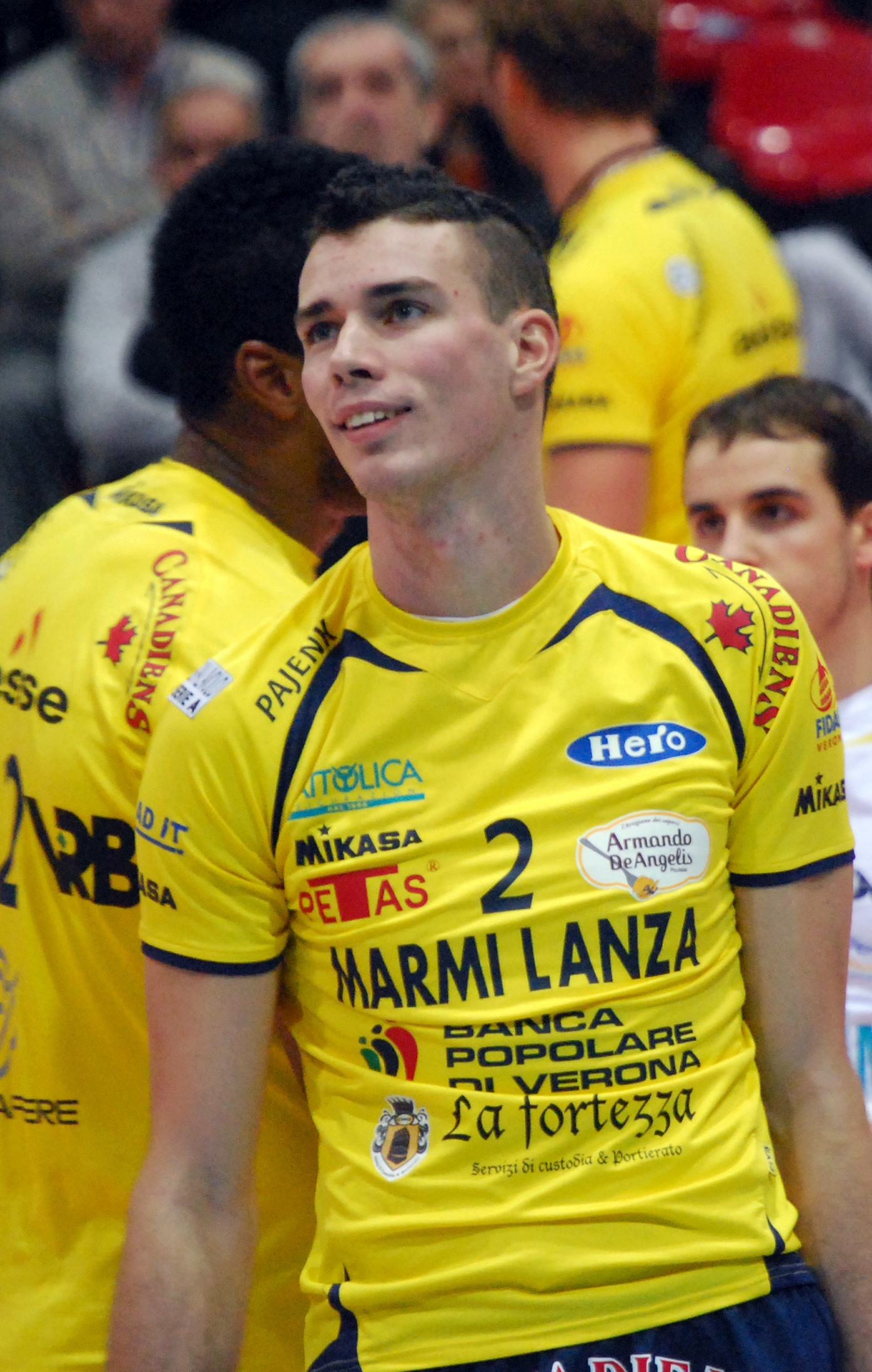
Pajenk with Marmi Lanza Verona in 2011

== Career ==
=== Club ===
In 2013, Pajenk moved to Jastrzębski Węgiel. In 2013–14, he reached the Final Four of the Champions League and won the bronze medal after defeating VC Zenit Kazan. Jastrzębski Węgiel, including Pajenk, also finished in third place in the Polish Championship during the same season.

=== National team ===
In August 2015, Pajenk won the gold medal with Slovenia in the 2015 European League. The same year, he was also the runner-up with Slovenia at the 2015 European Championship.

He represented Slovenia at the 2024 Summer Olympics.

== Honours ==
OK Maribor

- Slovenian Cup: 2005–06

ACH Volley

- Slovenian Championship: 2007–08, 2008–09, 2009–10
- Slovenian Cup: 2007–08, 2008–09, 2009–10

Volley Lube

- Italian Championship: 2011–12
- Italian Supercup: 2012–13

Fenerbahçe İstanbul

- Turkish Cup: 2016–17

Olympiacos Piraeus

- CEV Challenge Cup: 2022–23
- Hellenic Championship: 2022–23, 2023–24
- Hellenic Cup: 2023–24, 2024–25
- Hellenic League Cup: 2024–25
- Hellenic Super Cup: 2024

Individual

- Men's European Volleyball League best server: 2011
- Hellenic Championship MVP: 2022–23
- Hellenic Championship best middle blocker: 2021–22, 2022–23
