= Matej Kubš =

Slovak volleyball player (born 1988)

Matej Kubs

Personal information
- Nationality: Slovak
- Born: 26 May 1988 (age 38)
- Height: 1.88 m (6 ft 2 in)
- Weight: 82 kg (181 lb)
- Spike: 341 cm (134 in)
- Block: 315 cm (124 in)

Volleyball information
- Position: Libero
- Current club: VK Bystrina SPU Nitra

Career
Years	Teams
	Vk Prievidza; VK Bystrina SPU Nitra

National team
2015–	Slovakia

Matej Kubs (born 26 May 1988) is a Slovak male volleyball player. He is part of the Slovakia men's national volleyball team. On club level he plays for VK Bystrina SPU Nitra.
