= Štefan Chrtianský (born 1989) =

Slovak volleyball player (born 1989)

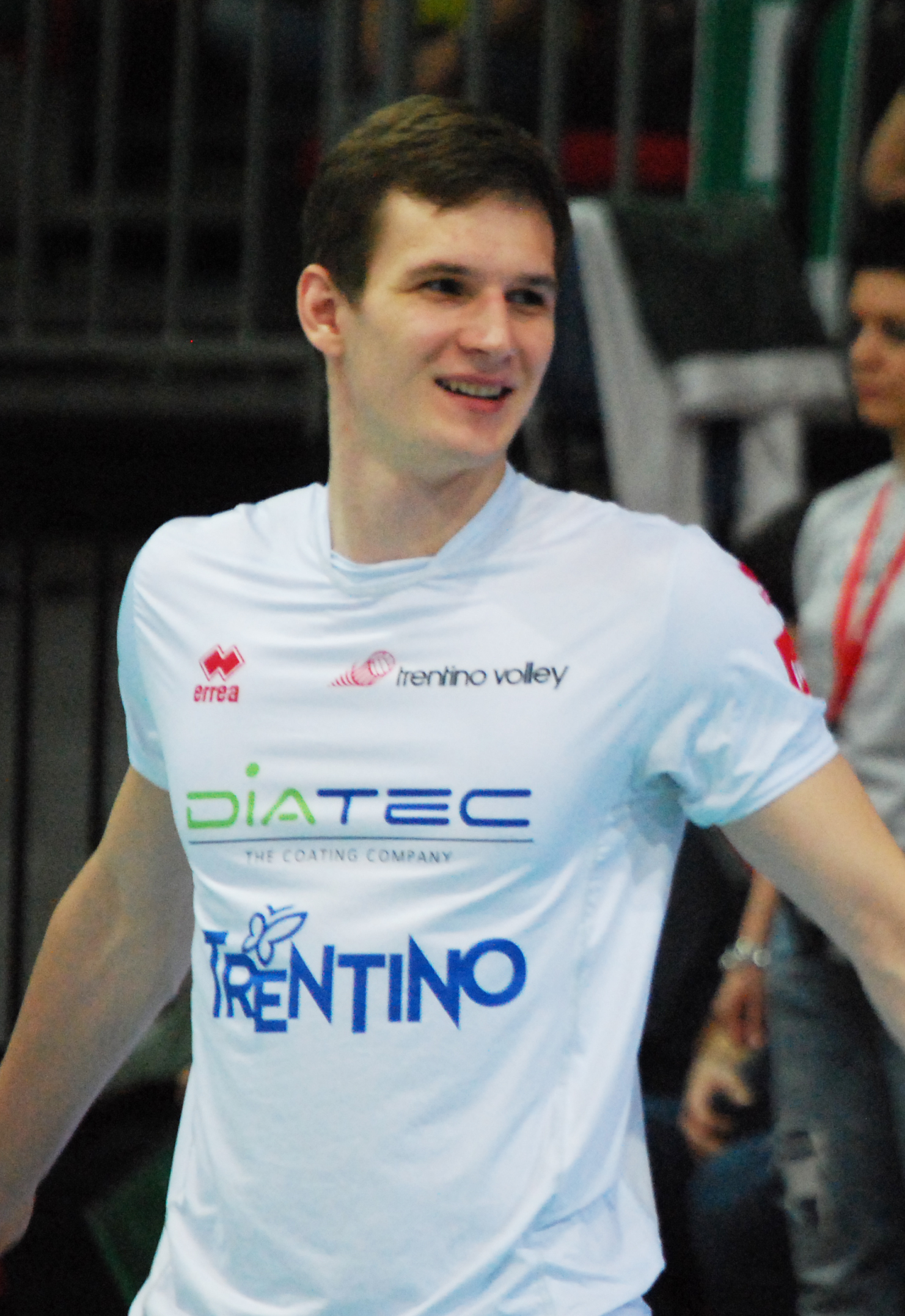

Personal information
- Nationality: Slovak
- Born: 17 August 1989 (age 37) Detva, Slovakia
- Height: 2.07 m (6 ft 9 in)
- Weight: 97 kg (214 lb)
- Spike: 350 cm (138 in)
- Block: 335 cm (132 in)

Volleyball information
- Position: Outside spiker
- Current club: Hypo Tirol Innsbruck

Career
- Years: Team
- Hypo Tirol Innsbruck

National team
- Years: Team
- Slovakia

Štefan Chrtianský (born 17 August 1989) is a Slovak male volleyball player. He is part of the Slovakia men's national volleyball team. On club level he plays for Hypo Tirol Innsbruck.
