= Kevin Klinkenberg =

Belgian volleyball player (born 1990)

Kévin Klinkenberg
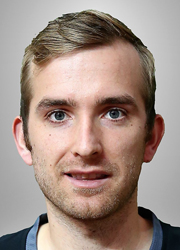

Personal information
- Nationality: Belgian
- Born: 4 October 1990 (age 36); Oupeye, Belgium
- Height: 1.97 m (6 ft 6 in)
- Weight: 86 kg (190 lb)
- Spike: 345 cm (136 in)

Volleyball information
- Position: Outside hitter
- Current club: Foinikas Syros

Career
Years	Teams
2007–2013; 2013–2015; 2015–2016; 2016–2017; 2017–2018; 2018–2019; 2019–2022; 2022–	Noliko Maaseik; Tours VB; Łuczniczka Bydgoszcz; Top Volley Latina; Revivre Milano; Fenerbahçe İstanbul; Ślepsk Suwałki; Foinikas Syros

National team
2014–	Belgium
Honours
Men's volleyball
Representing Belgium
European League
Gold medal – first place	2013 Turkey

Kévin Klinkenberg (born 4 October 1990) is a Belgian professional volleyball player. He is a former member of the Belgium national team. The 2013 European League winner. At the professional club level, he plays for Foinikas Syros.

== Career ==
On 14 July 2013, the Belgian national team, including Klinkenberg, won the 2013 European League.

== Honours ==
=== Clubs ===
- National championships
  - 2007/2008 Belgian Cup, with Noliko Maaseik
  - 2007/2008 Belgian Championship, with Noliko Maaseik
  - 2008/2009 Belgian SuperCup, with Noliko Maaseik
  - 2008/2009 Belgian Cup, with Noliko Maaseik
  - 2008/2009 Belgian Championship, with Noliko Maaseik
  - 2009/2010 Belgian SuperCup, with Noliko Maaseik
  - 2010/2011 Belgian Cup, with Noliko Maaseik
  - 2010/2011 Belgian Championship, with Noliko Maaseik
  - 2011/2012 Belgian SuperCup, with Noliko Maaseik
  - 2011/2012 Belgian Cup, with Noliko Maaseik
  - 2011/2012 Belgian Championship, with Noliko Maaseik
  - 2012/2013 Belgian SuperCup, with Noliko Maaseik
  - 2013/2014 French Cup, with Tours VB
  - 2013/2014 French Championship, with Tours VB
  - 2014/2015 French SuperCup, with Tours VB
  - 2014/2015 French Cup, with Tours VB
  - 2014/2015 French Championship, with Tours VB
  - 2018/2019 Turkish Cup, with Fenerbahçe İstanbul
  - 2018/2019 Turkish Championship, with Fenerbahçe İstanbul
