= Sergio Noda =

Spanish volleyball player (born 1987)

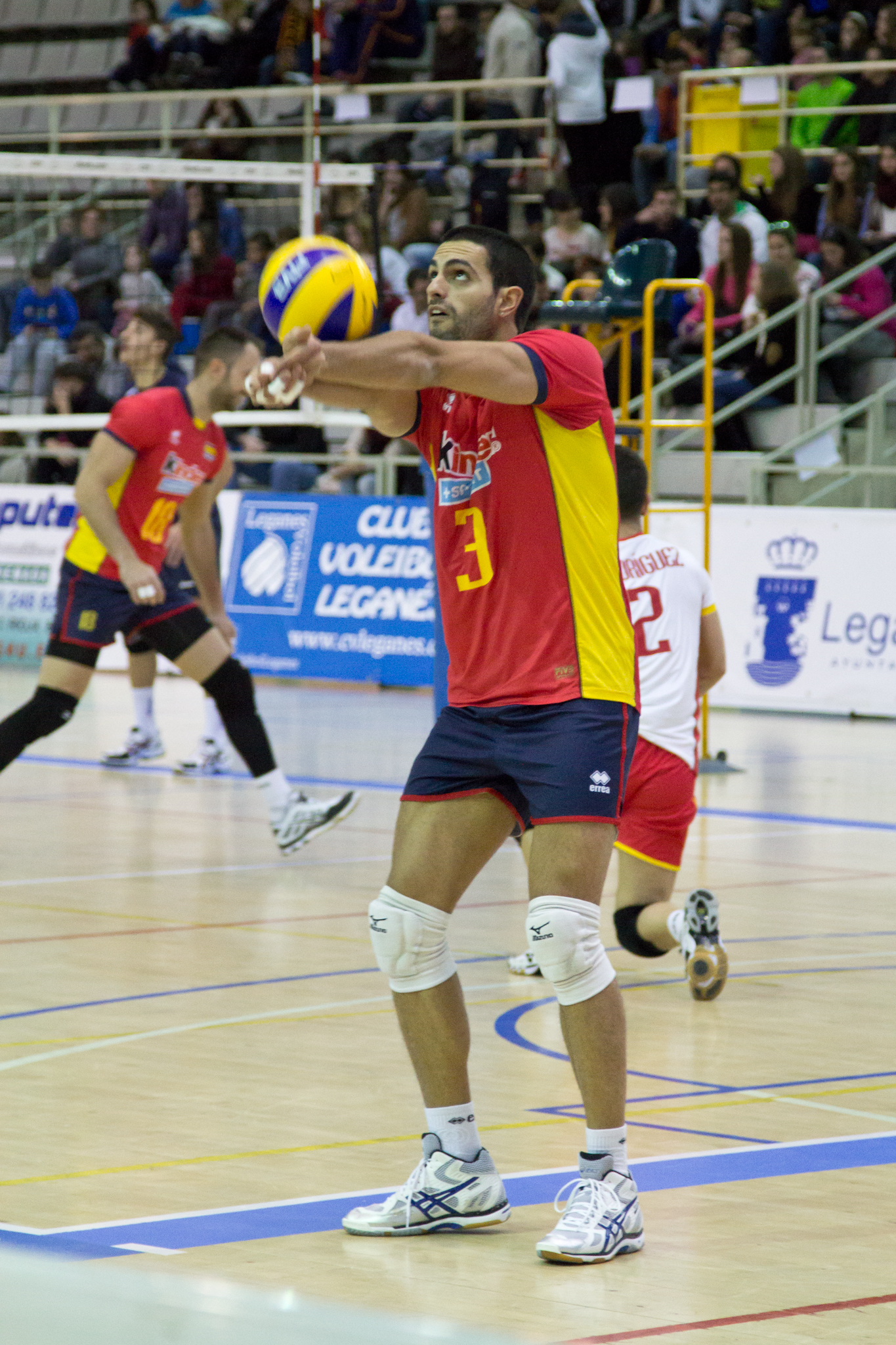

Personal information
- Full name: Sergio Noda Blanco
- Nationality: Cuban; Spanish
- Born: 23 March 1987 (age 39); Havana, Cuba
- Height: 1.89 m (6 ft 2 in)
- Weight: 82 kg (181 lb)
- Spike: 338 cm (133 in)
- Block: 320 cm (126 in)

Volleyball information
- Position: Outside spiker
- Current club: Emma Villas Siena
- Number: 3

Career
Years	Teams
2014–2015; 2015–	Pallavolo Molfetta; Emma Villas Siena

National team
2010–	Spain
Medal record
Men's volleyball
Representing Spain
Mediterranean Games
Silver medal – second place	2009 Pescara	Team

Sergio Noda Blanco (born 23 March 1987) is a Spanish male volleyball player. He was part of the Spain men's national volleyball team at the 2010 FIVB Volleyball Men's World Championship in Italy. He plays for Emma Villas Siena.

== Achievements ==
- 2009 European League – Silver Medal
- 2010 European League – Silver Medal
- 2011 European League – Silver Medal
