= Niklas Seppänen =

Finnish volleyball player (born 1993)

Personal information
- Nationality: Finnish
- Born: 30 June 1993 (age 33)
- Height: 1.93 m (6 ft 4 in)
- Weight: 84 kg (185 lb)
- Spike: 340 cm (134 in)
- Block: 320 cm (126 in)

Volleyball information
- Position: Outside spiker
- Current club: Tours VB
- Number: 15

Career
Years	Teams
	Kokkolan Tiikerit; Tours VB

National team
2014–	Finland

Niklas Seppänen (born 30 June 1993) is a Finnish male volleyball player. He was part of the Finland men's national volleyball team at the 2014 FIVB Volleyball Men's World Championship in Poland. He played for Tours VB.
