= Danijel Koncilja =

Slovenian volleyball player (born 1990)

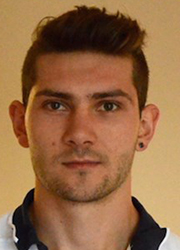
- Koncilja in 2016

Personal information
- Nationality: Slovenian
- Born: 4 September 1990 (age 36); Novo Mesto, SR Slovenia, Yugoslavia
- Height: 2.01 m (6 ft 7 in)
- Spike: 352 cm (139 in)
- Block: 341 cm (134 in)

Volleyball information
- Position: Middle blocker
- Current club: MOK Krka

Career
Years	Teams
2009–2011; 2011–2013; 2013–2016; 2016–2017; 2017–2018; 2018–2022; 2022–2024; 2024–	Marchiol Vodi Prvačina; OK Salonit Anhovo; SK Posojilnica Aich/Dob; Pallavolo Padova; Nice VB; AS Cannes; ACH Volley; MOK Krka

National team
2012–2023	Slovenia
Honours
Men's volleyball
Representing Slovenia
CEV European Championship
Silver medal – second place	2015 Bulgaria/Italy
Bronze medal – third place	2023 Italy/Bulgaria/North Macedonia/Israel

Danijel Koncilja (born 4 September 1990) is a Slovenian male volleyball player. With the Slovenia national team, he competed at the 2015 Men's European Volleyball Championship.
