= Matej Paták =

Slovak volleyball player (born 1990)

Matej Pátak

Personal information
- Nationality: Slovak
- Born: 8 June 1990 (age 36); Dolný Kubín, Czechoslovakia
- Height: 646 ft 4 in (197 m)
- Weight: 194 lb (88 kg)
- Spike: 139 in (353 cm)
- Block: 130 in (330 cm)

Volleyball information
- Position: Outside spiker
- Current club: (France) Chaumont VB 52
- Number: 7

Career
Years	Teams
2008-2010; 2010-2012; 2012-2013; 2013-2015; 2015-2016; 2016-2017; 2017-2018; 2018-	(Slovakia) RWE Brno (Slovakia) VKP Bratislava (Slovakia) Volley Team Unicef Bratislava (France) Beauvais Oise UC (Poland) AZS Częstochowa (France) Chaumont VB 52 (Poland) Aluron Virtu Warta Zawiercie (France) Chaumont VB 52

Matej Pátak (born 8 June 1990) is a Slovak volleyball player. Since the 2018/2019 season, he is playing in the French team Chaumont VB 52.

== Sporting achievements ==
=== Clubs ===
Slovakia Championship:

- 2011, 2013
- 2012

Slovakia Cup:

- 2013

Challenge Cup:

- 2017

French Championship:

- 2017
- 2019
