= Milan Bencz =

Slovak volleyball player (born 1987)

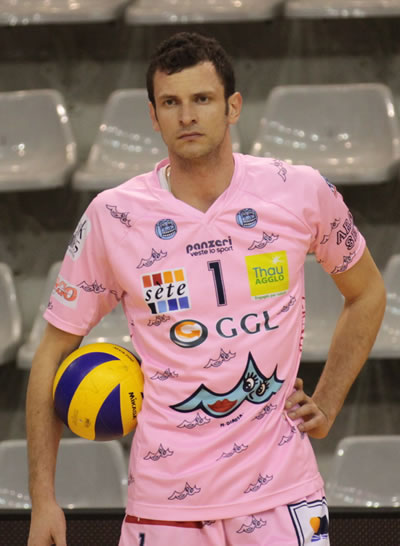

Personal information
- Nationality: Slovak
- Born: 5 September 1987 (age 39); Zlaté Moravce, Slovakia
- Height: 2.06 m (6 ft 9 in)
- Weight: 99 kg (218 lb)
- Spike: 363 cm (143 in)
- Block: 342 cm (135 in)

Volleyball information
- Position: Outside spiker
- Current club: Narbonne Volley

National team
Slovakia

Milan Bencz (Born 5 September 1987) is a Slovak volleyball player for Narbonne Volley and the Slovak national team.

He participated at the 2017 Men's European Volleyball Championship.
