= Juraj Zaťko =

Slovak volleyball player (born 1987)

Juraj Zatko

Personal information
- Nationality: Slovak
- Born: 5 June 1987 (age 39); Bratislava, Slovakia
- Height: 1.92 m (6 ft 4 in)
- Weight: 87 kg (192 lb)
- Spike: 347 cm (137 in)
- Block: 320 cm (126 in)

Volleyball information
- Position: Setter
- Current club: VK Bystrina SPU Nitra

Career
Years	Teams
	DHL Ostrava; Indykpol AZS Olsztyn; VK Bystrina SPU Nitra

National team
Slovakia

Juraj Zatko (born 5 June 1987) is a Slovak male volleyball player. He is part of the Slovakia men's national volleyball team. He competed at the 2009 Men's European Volleyball Championship. On club level he plays for VK Bystrina SPU Nitra.
