= 2017 FIVB Volleyball World League squads =

This article shows the roster of all participating teams at the 2017 FIVB Volleyball World League.

== Group 1 ==
=== Argentina ===
The following is the Argentine roster in the 2017 World League.

Head coach: Julio Velasco

No.	Name	Date of birth	Height	Weight	Spike	Block	2016–17 club
1	Alejandro Toro	20 July 1989	1.90 m (6 ft 3 in)	88 kg (194 lb)	326 cm (128 in)	308 cm (121 in)	(Argentina) Lomas Vóley
2	Fabián Flores	25 May 1991	1.98 m (6 ft 6 in)	74 kg (163 lb)	346 cm (136 in)	330 cm (130 in)	(Argentina) Ciudad de Campana
3	Germán Johansen	2 September 1995	2.00 m (6 ft 7 in)	85 kg (187 lb)	351 cm (138 in)	336 cm (132 in)	(Argentina) Club de Amigos
4	Maximiliano Cavanna	7 February 1988	1.85 m (6 ft 1 in)	79 kg (174 lb)	314 cm (124 in)	300 cm (120 in)	(Argentina) UPCN San Juan
5	Ignacio Fernández (L)	7 June 1994	1.77 m (5 ft 10 in)	73 kg (161 lb)	310 cm (120 in)	300 cm (120 in)	(Argentina) Ciudad de Buenos Aires
6	Cristian Poglajen	14 July 1989	1.95 m (6 ft 5 in)	94 kg (207 lb)	342 cm (135 in)	322 cm (127 in)	(Brazil) Montes Claros Vôlei
7	Lisandro Zanotti	4 October 1990	1.95 m (6 ft 5 in)	88 kg (194 lb)	336 cm (132 in)	315 cm (124 in)	(Argentina) Lomas Vóley
8	Demián González	21 February 1983	1.92 m (6 ft 4 in)	82 kg (181 lb)	350 cm (140 in)	333 cm (131 in)	(Brazil) Brasil Kirin Campinas
9	Gonzalo Quiroga	25 February 1993	1.93 m (6 ft 4 in)	85 kg (187 lb)	336 cm (132 in)	316 cm (124 in)	(Italy) Kioene Padova
10	Nicolás Bruno	24 February 1989	1.87 m (6 ft 2 in)	85 kg (187 lb)	338 cm (133 in)	318 cm (125 in)	(Argentina) Personal Bolívar
11	Sebastian Solé	12 June 1991	2.00 m (6 ft 7 in)	94 kg (207 lb)	362 cm (143 in)	342 cm (135 in)	(Italy) Diatec Trentino
13	Santiago Darraidou	24 November 1980	1.94 m (6 ft 4 in)	96 kg (212 lb)	345 cm (136 in)	335 cm (132 in)	(Argentina) Sarmiento de Resistencia
14	Pablo Crer	12 June 1989	2.02 m (6 ft 8 in)	85 kg (187 lb)	357 cm (141 in)	337 cm (133 in)	(Argentina) Personal Bolívar
15	Luciano De Cecco (C)	2 June 1988	1.91 m (6 ft 3 in)	98 kg (216 lb)	332 cm (131 in)	315 cm (124 in)	(Italy) Sir Sicoma Colussi Perugia
16	Alexis González (L)	21 July 1981	1.84 m (6 ft 0 in)	85 kg (187 lb)	327 cm (129 in)	310 cm (120 in)	(Argentina) Personal Bolívar
17	Facundo Imhoff	25 January 1989	2.02 m (6 ft 8 in)	88 kg (194 lb)	345 cm (136 in)	325 cm (128 in)	(Argentina) Lomas Vóley
18	Martín Ramos	26 August 1991	1.97 m (6 ft 6 in)	94 kg (207 lb)	348 cm (137 in)	328 cm (129 in)	(Argentina) UPCN San Juan
19	Nicolás Lazo	16 April 1995	1.92 m (6 ft 4 in)	85 kg (187 lb)	340 cm (130 in)	320 cm (130 in)	(Argentina) UPCN San Juan

=== Belgium ===
The following is the Belgian roster in the 2017 World League.

Head coach: Vital Heynen

No.	Name	Date of birth	Height	Weight	Spike	Block	2016–17 club
1	Bram Van Den Dries	14 August 1989	2.08 m (6 ft 10 in)	99 kg (218 lb)	361 cm (142 in)	325 cm (128 in)	(France) Spacer's Toulouse
2	Hendrik Tuerlinckx	1 December 1987	1.95 m (6 ft 5 in)	86 kg (190 lb)	355 cm (140 in)	321 cm (126 in)	(Belgium) Knack Randstad Roeselare
3	Sam Deroo (C)	29 April 1992	2.03 m (6 ft 8 in)	105 kg (231 lb)	355 cm (140 in)	335 cm (132 in)	(Poland) ZAKSA Kędzierzyn-Koźle
4	Pieter Coolman	24 April 1989	2.00 m (6 ft 7 in)	90 kg (200 lb)	351 cm (138 in)	321 cm (126 in)	(Belgium) Knack Randstad Roeselare
5	Lienert Cosemans	20 October 1993	2.03 m (6 ft 8 in)	93 kg (205 lb)	340 cm (130 in)	315 cm (124 in)	(Belgium) VDK Gent Heren
6	Lowie Stuer	24 November 1995	1.94 m (6 ft 4 in)	80 kg (180 lb)	331 cm (130 in)	310 cm (120 in)	(Belgium) VDK Gent Heren
7	François Lecat	19 April 1993	2.00 m (6 ft 7 in)	96 kg (212 lb)	347 cm (137 in)	320 cm (130 in)	(Italy) Calzedonia Verona
8	Kevin Klinkenberg	4 October 1990	1.97 m (6 ft 6 in)	94 kg (207 lb)	343 cm (135 in)	314 cm (124 in)	(Italy) Top Volley Latina
9	Pieter Verhees	8 December 1989	2.05 m (6 ft 9 in)	112 kg (247 lb)	365 cm (144 in)	350 cm (140 in)	(Italy) Gi Group Monza
10	Simon Van De Voorde	19 December 1989	2.08 m (6 ft 10 in)	100 kg (220 lb)	338 cm (133 in)	318 cm (125 in)	(Italy) Diatec Trentino
12	Gert Van Walle	7 August 1987	1.97 m (6 ft 6 in)	91 kg (201 lb)	350 cm (140 in)	318 cm (125 in)	(Poland) GKS Katowice
14	Jelle Ribbens	17 March 1992	1.85 m (6 ft 1 in)	79 kg (174 lb)	331 cm (130 in)	300 cm (120 in)	(France) Nice
15	Stijn D'Hulst	24 April 1991	1.87 m (6 ft 2 in)	75 kg (165 lb)	321 cm (126 in)	305 cm (120 in)	(Belgium) Knack Randstad Roeselare
16	Matthias Valkiers	8 April 1990	1.94 m (6 ft 4 in)	92 kg (203 lb)	339 cm (133 in)	310 cm (120 in)	(Romania) Remat Zalău
17	Tomas Rousseaux	31 March 1994	1.99 m (6 ft 6 in)	90 kg (200 lb)	352 cm (139 in)	317 cm (125 in)	(Germany) Friedrichshafen
19	Wannes De Beul	10 June 1991	1.95 m (6 ft 5 in)	95 kg (209 lb)	332 cm (131 in)	315 cm (124 in)	(Belgium) Euphony Asse-Lennik
20	Arno Van De Velde	30 December 1995	2.10 m (6 ft 11 in)	93 kg (205 lb)	350 cm (140 in)	340 cm (130 in)	(Belgium) Knack Randstad Roeselare
21	Jolan Cox	12 July 1991	1.94 m (6 ft 4 in)	72 kg (159 lb)	342 cm (135 in)	315 cm (124 in)	(Belgium) Topvolley Precura Antwerpen

=== Brazil ===
The following is the Brazilian roster in the 2017 World League.

Head coach: Renan Dal Zotto

No.	Name	Date of birth	Height	Weight	Spike	Block	2016–17 club
1	Bruno Rezende (C)	2 July 1986	1.90 m (6 ft 3 in)	76 kg (168 lb)	323 cm (127 in)	302 cm (119 in)	(Brazil) SESI São Paulo
3	Éder Carbonera	19 October 1983	2.05 m (6 ft 9 in)	107 kg (236 lb)	360 cm (140 in)	330 cm (130 in)	(Brazil) Funvic Taubaté
4	Wallace de Souza	26 June 1987	1.98 m (6 ft 6 in)	87 kg (192 lb)	344 cm (135 in)	318 cm (125 in)	(Brazil) Funvic Taubaté
5	Lucas Lóh	18 January 1991	1.95 m (6 ft 5 in)	83 kg (183 lb)	336 cm (132 in)	320 cm (130 in)	(Brazil) Funvic Taubaté
6	Tiago Brendle (L)	21 October 1985	1.88 m (6 ft 2 in)	83 kg (183 lb)	315 cm (124 in)	300 cm (120 in)	(Brazil) Brasil Kirin Campinas
7	Murilo Radke	31 January 1989	1.94 m (6 ft 4 in)	76 kg (168 lb)	329 cm (130 in)	310 cm (120 in)	(Brazil) Montes Claros Vôlei
8	Thales Hoss (L)	26 April 1989	1.90 m (6 ft 3 in)	74 kg (163 lb)	329 cm (130 in)	303 cm (119 in)	(Brazil) Vôlei Canoas
9	Raphael Vieira de Oliveira	14 June 1979	1.90 m (6 ft 3 in)	82 kg (181 lb)	330 cm (130 in)	306 cm (120 in)	(Brazil) Funvic Taubaté
10	Otávio Pinto	27 February 1991	2.00 m (6 ft 7 in)	85 kg (187 lb)	347 cm (137 in)	319 cm (126 in)	(Brazil) Funvic Taubaté
11	Rodrigo Leão	5 June 1996	1.97 m (6 ft 6 in)	85 kg (187 lb)	331 cm (130 in)	316 cm (124 in)	(Brazil) Sada Cruzeiro
12	Luiz Felipe Fonteles	19 June 1984	1.98 m (6 ft 6 in)	100 kg (220 lb)	351 cm (138 in)	340 cm (130 in)	(Turkey) Halkbank Ankara
13	Maurício Souza	29 September 1988	2.09 m (6 ft 10 in)	93 kg (205 lb)	344 cm (135 in)	323 cm (127 in)	(Brazil) Brasil Kirin Campinas
14	Douglas Souza	20 August 1995	1.99 m (6 ft 6 in)	75 kg (165 lb)	338 cm (133 in)	317 cm (125 in)	(Brazil) SESI São Paulo
16	Lucas Saatkamp	6 March 1986	2.09 m (6 ft 10 in)	101 kg (223 lb)	340 cm (130 in)	321 cm (126 in)	(Brazil) SESI São Paulo
17	Evandro Guerra	27 December 1981	2.07 m (6 ft 9 in)	106 kg (234 lb)	359 cm (141 in)	332 cm (131 in)	(Brazil) Sada Cruzeiro
18	Ricardo Lucarelli Souza	14 February 1992	1.96 m (6 ft 5 in)	87 kg (192 lb)	348 cm (137 in)	326 cm (128 in)	(Brazil) Funvic Taubaté
19	Maurício Borges Silva	4 February 1989	1.99 m (6 ft 6 in)	99 kg (218 lb)	335 cm (132 in)	315 cm (124 in)	(Turkey) Arkas İzmir
20	Renan Buiatti	10 January 1990	2.17 m (7 ft 1 in)	105 kg (231 lb)	350 cm (140 in)	314 cm (124 in)	(Brazil) Juiz de Fora

=== Bulgaria ===
The following is the Bulgarian roster in the 2017 World League.

Head coach: Plamen Konstantinov

No.	Name	Date of birth	Height	Weight	Spike	Block	2016–17 club
1	Georgi Bratoev	21 October 1987	2.03 m (6 ft 8 in)	96 kg (212 lb)	340 cm (130 in)	325 cm (128 in)	(Bulgaria) Lukoil Neftohimik
3	Martin Atanasov	27 September 1996	1.98 m (6 ft 6 in)	80 kg (180 lb)	350 cm (140 in)	330 cm (130 in)	(Bulgaria) Dobrudzha 07
4	Dimitar Marinkov	11 September 1993	1.96 m (6 ft 5 in)	84 kg (185 lb)	328 cm (129 in)	316 cm (124 in)	(Bulgaria) Dobrudzha 07
5	Svetoslav Gotsev	31 August 1990	2.05 m (6 ft 9 in)	97 kg (214 lb)	358 cm (141 in)	335 cm (132 in)	(Italy) Biosì Indexa Sora
6	Rozalin Penchev	11 December 1994	1.97 m (6 ft 6 in)	79 kg (174 lb)	337 cm (133 in)	327 cm (129 in)	(Italy) Top Volley Latina
7	Jani Jeliazkov	15 September 1992	2.05 m (6 ft 9 in)	90 kg (200 lb)	356 cm (140 in)	328 cm (129 in)	(Bulgaria) Lukoil Neftohimik
8	Todor Skrimov	9 January 1990	1.91 m (6 ft 3 in)	87 kg (192 lb)	348 cm (137 in)	330 cm (130 in)	(Italy) Revivre Milano
9	Lubomir Agontsev	26 August 1987	1.90 m (6 ft 3 in)	87 kg (192 lb)	330 cm (130 in)	320 cm (130 in)	(Bulgaria) Montana
11	Georgi Seganov	10 June 1993	1.98 m (6 ft 6 in)	83 kg (183 lb)	355 cm (140 in)	325 cm (128 in)	(Italy) Biosì Indexa Sora
12	Viktor Yosifov (C)	16 October 1985	2.04 m (6 ft 8 in)	100 kg (220 lb)	350 cm (140 in)	340 cm (130 in)	(Italy) LPR Piacenza
13	Teodor Salparov (L)	16 August 1982	1.87 m (6 ft 2 in)	77 kg (170 lb)	320 cm (130 in)	305 cm (120 in)	(Russia) Zenit Kazan
14	Teodor Todorov	1 September 1989	2.08 m (6 ft 10 in)	108 kg (238 lb)	365 cm (144 in)	345 cm (136 in)	(Russia) Gazprom-Ugra Surgut
16	Vladislav Ivanov (L)	14 March 1987	1.88 m (6 ft 2 in)	80 kg (180 lb)	320 cm (130 in)	310 cm (120 in)	(Bulgaria) Levski Sofia
17	Nikolay Penchev	22 May 1992	1.97 m (6 ft 6 in)	87 kg (192 lb)	341 cm (134 in)	335 cm (132 in)	(Poland) PGE Skra Bełchatów
18	Nikolay Nikolov	29 July 1986	2.06 m (6 ft 9 in)	97 kg (214 lb)	350 cm (140 in)	332 cm (131 in)	(Bulgaria) Lukoil Neftohimik
19	Tsvetan Sokolov	31 December 1989	2.06 m (6 ft 9 in)	100 kg (220 lb)	370 cm (150 in)	350 cm (140 in)	(Italy) Cucine Lube Civitanova
20	Vladimir Stankov	9 August 1996	1.86 m (6 ft 1 in)	80 kg (180 lb)	325 cm (128 in)	320 cm (130 in)	(Bulgaria) CSKA Sofia
21	Nikolay Kartev	20 September 1995	2.02 m (6 ft 8 in)	90 kg (200 lb)	340 cm (130 in)	330 cm (130 in)	(Bulgaria) Montana

=== Canada ===
The following is the Canadian roster in the 2017 World League.

Head coach: Stéphane Antiga

No.	Name	Date of birth	Height	Weight	Spike	Block	2016–17 club
1	TJ Sanders (C)	14 December 1991	1.91 m (6 ft 3 in)	81 kg (179 lb)	326 cm (128 in)	308 cm (121 in)	(Turkey) Arkas İzmir
2	John Gordon Perrin	17 August 1989	2.01 m (6 ft 7 in)	95 kg (209 lb)	353 cm (139 in)	329 cm (130 in)	(Poland) Asseco Resovia Rzeszów
3	Steven Marshall	23 November 1989	1.93 m (6 ft 4 in)	87 kg (192 lb)	350 cm (140 in)	323 cm (127 in)	(Germany) Berlin Recycling Volleys
4	Nicholas Hoag	19 August 1992	2.00 m (6 ft 7 in)	91 kg (201 lb)	342 cm (135 in)	322 cm (127 in)	(Italy) Revivre Milano
5	Rudy Verhoeff	24 June 1989	1.98 m (6 ft 6 in)	88 kg (194 lb)	349 cm (137 in)	317 cm (125 in)	(Germany) Powervolleys Düren
6	Justin Duff	10 May 1988	2.00 m (6 ft 7 in)	102 kg (225 lb)	370 cm (150 in)	335 cm (132 in)	(Greece) Olympiacos
7	Stephen Timothy Maar	6 December 1994	2.01 m (6 ft 7 in)	103 kg (227 lb)	350 cm (140 in)	328 cm (129 in)	(Italy) Kioene Padova
8	Jay Blankenau	27 September 1989	1.94 m (6 ft 4 in)	94 kg (207 lb)	334 cm (131 in)	307 cm (121 in)	(Germany) Powervolleys Düren
9	Jason DeRocco	19 September 1989	1.98 m (6 ft 6 in)	94 kg (207 lb)	342 cm (135 in)	318 cm (125 in)	(Poland) Jastrzębski Węgiel
10	Sharone Vernon-Evans	28 August 1998	2.02 m (6 ft 8 in)	94 kg (207 lb)	374 cm (147 in)	347 cm (137 in)	(Canada) FTC Gatineau
11	Daniel Jansen Van Doorn	21 March 1990	2.07 m (6 ft 9 in)	98 kg (216 lb)	351 cm (138 in)	328 cm (129 in)	(France) Tours
12	Lucas Van Berkel	29 November 1991	2.10 m (6 ft 11 in)	108 kg (238 lb)	350 cm (140 in)	326 cm (128 in)	(Switzerland) Amriswil
13	Ryley Barnes	11 October 1993	2.00 m (6 ft 7 in)	92 kg (203 lb)	348 cm (137 in)	325 cm (128 in)	(France) Tours
17	Graham Vigrass	17 June 1989	2.05 m (6 ft 9 in)	97 kg (214 lb)	354 cm (139 in)	330 cm (130 in)	(Germany) Berlin Recycling Volleys
18	Bradley Gunter	5 December 1993	1.98 m (6 ft 6 in)	91 kg (201 lb)	354 cm (139 in)	323 cm (127 in)	(Estonia) Bigbank Tartu
19	Blair Bann	26 February 1988	1.84 m (6 ft 0 in)	84 kg (185 lb)	314 cm (124 in)	295 cm (116 in)	(Germany) Powervolleys Düren
20	Arthur Szwarc	30 March 1995	2.07 m (6 ft 9 in)	97 kg (214 lb)	356 cm (140 in)	335 cm (132 in)	(Canada) FTC Gatineau
21	Brett James Walsh	12 February 1994	1.95 m (6 ft 5 in)	84 kg (185 lb)	332 cm (131 in)	313 cm (123 in)	(Canada) Alberta Golden Bears

=== France ===
The following is the French roster in the 2017 World League.

Head coach: Laurent Tillie

No.	Name	Date of birth	Height	Weight	Spike	Block	2016–17 club
1	Jonas Aguenier	28 April 1992	2.02 m (6 ft 8 in)	92 kg (203 lb)	340 cm (130 in)	310 cm (120 in)	(France) Chaumont 52
2	Jenia Grebennikov (L)	13 August 1990	1.88 m (6 ft 2 in)	85 kg (187 lb)	345 cm (136 in)	330 cm (130 in)	(Italy) Cucine Lube Civitanova
4	Jean Patry	27 December 1996	2.08 m (6 ft 10 in)	94 kg (207 lb)	337 cm (133 in)	314 cm (124 in)	(France) Montpellier UC
5	Trévor Clévenot	28 June 1994	1.99 m (6 ft 6 in)	89 kg (196 lb)	335 cm (132 in)	316 cm (124 in)	(Italy) LRP Piacenza
6	Benjamin Toniutti (C)	30 October 1989	1.83 m (6 ft 0 in)	73 kg (161 lb)	320 cm (130 in)	300 cm (120 in)	(Poland) ZAKSA Kędzierzyn-Koźle
8	Julien Lyneel	15 April 1990	1.91 m (6 ft 3 in)	87 kg (192 lb)	345 cm (136 in)	325 cm (128 in)	(Italy) Bunge Ravenna
9	Earvin N'Gapeth	12 February 1991	1.94 m (6 ft 4 in)	101 kg (223 lb)	358 cm (141 in)	327 cm (129 in)	(Italy) Azimut Modena
10	Kévin Le Roux	11 May 1989	2.09 m (6 ft 10 in)	98 kg (216 lb)	365 cm (144 in)	345 cm (136 in)	(Italy) Azimut Modena
11	Antoine Brizard	22 May 1994	1.94 m (6 ft 4 in)	96 kg (212 lb)	340 cm (130 in)	310 cm (120 in)	(France) Spacer's Toulouse
12	Stéphen Boyer	10 April 1996	1.96 m (6 ft 5 in)	85 kg (187 lb)	335 cm (132 in)	314 cm (124 in)	(France) Chaumont 52
13	Pierre Pujol	13 July 1984	1.86 m (6 ft 1 in)	90 kg (200 lb)	335 cm (132 in)	315 cm (124 in)	(France) Cannes
14	Nicolas Le Goff	15 February 1992	2.06 m (6 ft 9 in)	115 kg (254 lb)	365 cm (144 in)	328 cm (129 in)	(Turkey) İstanbul BBSK
15	Horacio d'Almeida	11 June 1988	2.02 m (6 ft 8 in)	109 kg (240 lb)	355 cm (140 in)	330 cm (130 in)	(France) Cannes
16	Daryl Bultor	17 November 1995	2.02 m (6 ft 8 in)	94 kg (207 lb)	342 cm (135 in)	317 cm (125 in)	(France) Montpellier UC
17	Guillaume Quesque	29 April 1989	2.03 m (6 ft 8 in)	92 kg (203 lb)	350 cm (140 in)	325 cm (128 in)	(Turkey) Fenerbahçe
18	Thibault Rossard	28 August 1993	1.93 m (6 ft 4 in)	85 kg (187 lb)	350 cm (140 in)	320 cm (130 in)	(Poland) Asseco Resovia Rzeszów
20	Nicolas Rossard (L)	23 May 1990	1.83 m (6 ft 0 in)	65 kg (143 lb)	315 cm (124 in)	305 cm (120 in)	(France) Spacer's Toulouse
21	Barthélémy Chinenyeze	28 February 1998	2.01 m (6 ft 7 in)	81 kg (179 lb)	357 cm (141 in)	332 cm (131 in)	(France) Spacer's Toulouse

=== Iran ===
The following is the Iranian roster in the 2017 World League.

Head coach: Igor Kolaković

No.	Name	Date of birth	Height	Weight	Spike	Block	2016–17 club
1	Farhad Salafzoon	6 December 1992	2.00 m (6 ft 7 in)	81 kg (179 lb)	320 cm (130 in)	313 cm (123 in)	(Iran) Matin Varamin
2	Milad Ebadipour	17 October 1993	1.96 m (6 ft 5 in)	78 kg (172 lb)	350 cm (140 in)	310 cm (120 in)	(Iran) Shahrdari Urmia
3	Saman Faezi	23 August 1991	2.04 m (6 ft 8 in)	87 kg (192 lb)	343 cm (135 in)	335 cm (132 in)	(Iran) Paykan Tehran
4	Saeid Marouf (C)	20 October 1985	1.89 m (6 ft 2 in)	81 kg (179 lb)	331 cm (130 in)	311 cm (122 in)	(Iran) Shahrdari Urmia
5	Farhad Ghaemi	28 August 1989	1.97 m (6 ft 6 in)	73 kg (161 lb)	355 cm (140 in)	335 cm (132 in)	(Iran) Paykan Tehran
6	Mohammad Mousavi	22 August 1987	2.03 m (6 ft 8 in)	86 kg (190 lb)	362 cm (143 in)	344 cm (135 in)	(Iran) Sarmayeh Bank Tehran
8	Mostafa Heydari	14 December 1991	1.75 m (5 ft 9 in)	68 kg (150 lb)	263 cm (104 in)	259 cm (102 in)	(Iran) Saipa Tehran
9	Adel Gholami	9 February 1986	1.95 m (6 ft 5 in)	88 kg (194 lb)	341 cm (134 in)	330 cm (130 in)	(Iran) Sarmayeh Bank Tehran
10	Amir Ghafour	6 June 1991	2.02 m (6 ft 8 in)	90 kg (200 lb)	354 cm (139 in)	334 cm (131 in)	(Iran) Paykan Tehran
11	Farhad Nazari Afshar	22 May 1984	1.95 m (6 ft 5 in)	93 kg (205 lb)	320 cm (130 in)	308 cm (121 in)	(Iran) Paykan Tehran
12	Mojtaba Mirzajanpour	7 October 1991	2.05 m (6 ft 9 in)	88 kg (194 lb)	355 cm (140 in)	348 cm (137 in)	(Iran) Paykan Tehran
13	Javad Hosseinabadi	31 December 1993	1.95 m (6 ft 5 in)	87 kg (192 lb)	330 cm (130 in)	310 cm (120 in)	(Iran) Kalleh Mazandaran
14	Mohammad Javad Manavinejad	27 November 1995	2.00 m (6 ft 7 in)	84 kg (185 lb)	340 cm (130 in)	320 cm (130 in)	(Iran) Paykan Tehran
16	Ali Shafiei	21 September 1991	1.90 m (6 ft 3 in)	80 kg (180 lb)	348 cm (137 in)	345 cm (136 in)	(Iran) Novin Keshavarz Tehran
17	Reza Ghara	31 July 1991	2.00 m (6 ft 7 in)	87 kg (192 lb)	351 cm (138 in)	331 cm (130 in)	(Iran) Kalleh Mazandaran
18	Mohamad Taher Vadi	10 October 1989	1.94 m (6 ft 4 in)	72 kg (159 lb)	329 cm (130 in)	315 cm (124 in)	(Iran) Matin Varamin
19	Mehdi Marandi (L)	12 May 1986	1.72 m (5 ft 8 in)	69 kg (152 lb)	295 cm (116 in)	280 cm (110 in)	(Iran) Paykan Tehran
21	Salim Cheperli	19 December 1996	2.01 m (6 ft 7 in)	80 kg (180 lb)	340 cm (130 in)	330 cm (130 in)	(Iran) Vezarat Defa Tehran

=== Italy ===
The following is the Italian roster in the 2017 World League.

Head coach: Gianlorenzo Blengini

No.	Name	Date of birth	Height	Weight	Spike	Block	2016–17 club
1	Davide Candellaro	7 June 1989	2.00 m (6 ft 7 in)	88 kg (194 lb)	340 cm (130 in)	320 cm (130 in)	(Italy) Cucine Lube Civitanova
2	Luigi Randazzo	30 April 1994	1.98 m (6 ft 6 in)	97 kg (214 lb)	352 cm (139 in)	255 cm (100 in)	(Italy) Calzedonia Verona
3	Nicola Pesaresi	11 February 1991	1.90 m (6 ft 3 in)	80 kg (180 lb)	315 cm (124 in)	309 cm (122 in)	(Italy) Cucine Lube Civitanova
4	Luca Vettori	26 April 1991	2.00 m (6 ft 7 in)	95 kg (209 lb)	345 cm (136 in)	323 cm (127 in)	(Italy) Azimut Modena
5	Luca Spirito	30 October 1993	1.96 m (6 ft 5 in)	79 kg (174 lb)	338 cm (133 in)	262 cm (103 in)	(Italy) Bunge Ravenna
6	Simone Giannelli	9 August 1996	1.98 m (6 ft 6 in)	92 kg (203 lb)	350 cm (140 in)	330 cm (130 in)	(Italy) Diatec Trentino
7	Fabio Balaso	20 October 1995	1.78 m (5 ft 10 in)	73 kg (161 lb)	305 cm (120 in)	280 cm (110 in)	(Italy) Kioene Padova
9	Daniele Mazzone	4 June 1992	2.08 m (6 ft 10 in)	88 kg (194 lb)	315 cm (124 in)	309 cm (122 in)	(Italy) Diatec Trentino
10	Filippo Lanza	3 March 1991	1.98 m (6 ft 6 in)	98 kg (216 lb)	350 cm (140 in)	330 cm (130 in)	(Italy) Diatec Trentino
11	Simone Buti (C)	19 September 1983	2.06 m (6 ft 9 in)	100 kg (220 lb)	346 cm (136 in)	328 cm (129 in)	(Italy) Sir Sicoma Colussi Perugia
13	Massimo Colaci	21 February 1985	1.80 m (5 ft 11 in)	75 kg (165 lb)	314 cm (124 in)	306 cm (120 in)	(Italy) Diatec Trentino
14	Matteo Piano	24 October 1990	2.08 m (6 ft 10 in)	102 kg (225 lb)	352 cm (139 in)	325 cm (128 in)	(Italy) Azimut Modena
16	Oleg Antonov	28 July 1988	1.98 m (6 ft 6 in)	88 kg (194 lb)	340 cm (130 in)	310 cm (120 in)	(Italy) Diatec Trentino
17	Iacopo Botto	22 September 1987	1.91 m (6 ft 3 in)	76 kg (168 lb)	345 cm (136 in)	320 cm (130 in)	(Italy) Gi Group Monza
18	Giulio Sabbi	10 August 1989	2.01 m (6 ft 7 in)	92 kg (203 lb)	352 cm (139 in)	325 cm (128 in)	(Italy) Exprivia Molfetta
19	Fabio Ricci	11 July 1994	2.04 m (6 ft 8 in)	96 kg (212 lb)	348 cm (137 in)	272 cm (107 in)	(Italy) Bunge Ravenna
20	Tiziano Mazzone	22 July 1995	1.98 m (6 ft 6 in)	95 kg (209 lb)	350 cm (140 in)	315 cm (124 in)	(Italy) Diatec Trentino
21	Riccardo Sbertoli	23 May 1998	1.88 m (6 ft 2 in)	85 kg (187 lb)	326 cm (128 in)	246 cm (97 in)	(Italy) Revivre Milano

=== Poland ===
The following is the Polish roster in the 2017 World League.

Head coach: Ferdinando De Giorgi

No.	Name	Date of birth	Height	Weight	Spike	Block	2016–17 club
2	Maciej Muzaj	21 May 1994	2.08 m (6 ft 10 in)	86 kg (190 lb)	360 cm (140 in)	320 cm (130 in)	(Poland) Jastrzębski Węgiel
3	Dawid Konarski	31 August 1989	1.98 m (6 ft 6 in)	93 kg (205 lb)	353 cm (139 in)	320 cm (130 in)	(Poland) ZAKSA Kędzierzyn-Koźle
4	Marcin Komenda	24 May 1996	1.98 m (6 ft 6 in)	90 kg (200 lb)	335 cm (132 in)	315 cm (124 in)	(Poland) Effector Kielce
5	Łukasz Kaczmarek	29 June 1994	2.04 m (6 ft 8 in)	99 kg (218 lb)	345 cm (136 in)	332 cm (131 in)	(Poland) Cuprum Lubin
6	Bartosz Kurek	29 August 1988	2.05 m (6 ft 9 in)	87 kg (192 lb)	352 cm (139 in)	326 cm (128 in)	(Poland) PGE Skra Bełchatów
7	Karol Kłos	8 August 1989	2.01 m (6 ft 7 in)	87 kg (192 lb)	357 cm (141 in)	326 cm (128 in)	(Poland) PGE Skra Bełchatów
8	Andrzej Wrona	27 December 1988	2.05 m (6 ft 9 in)	95 kg (209 lb)	350 cm (140 in)	265 cm (104 in)	(Poland) AZS Politechnika Warszawska
9	Bartłomiej Lemański	19 March 1996	2.17 m (7 ft 1 in)	103 kg (227 lb)	360 cm (140 in)	345 cm (136 in)	(Poland) Asseco Resovia Rzeszów
10	Damian Wojtaszek (L)	7 September 1988	1.80 m (5 ft 11 in)	76 kg (168 lb)	330 cm (130 in)	301 cm (119 in)	(Poland) Asseco Resovia Rzeszów
11	Fabian Drzyzga	3 January 1990	1.96 m (6 ft 5 in)	90 kg (200 lb)	325 cm (128 in)	304 cm (120 in)	(Poland) Asseco Resovia Rzeszów
12	Grzegorz Łomacz	1 October 1987	1.87 m (6 ft 2 in)	80 kg (180 lb)	335 cm (132 in)	315 cm (124 in)	(Poland) Cuprum Lubin
13	Michał Kubiak (C)	23 February 1988	1.91 m (6 ft 3 in)	80 kg (180 lb)	328 cm (129 in)	312 cm (123 in)	(Japan) Panasonic Panthers
14	Aleksander Śliwka	24 May 1995	1.96 m (6 ft 5 in)	88 kg (194 lb)	340 cm (130 in)	315 cm (124 in)	(Poland) Indykpol AZS Olsztyn
15	Jakub Kochanowski	17 July 1997	1.99 m (6 ft 6 in)	84 kg (185 lb)	348 cm (137 in)	313 cm (123 in)	(Poland) Indykpol AZS Olsztyn
16	Kacper Piechocki (L)	17 February 1995	1.84 m (6 ft 0 in)	70 kg (150 lb)	316 cm (124 in)	305 cm (120 in)	(Poland) PGE Skra Bełchatów
17	Paweł Zatorski (L)	21 June 1990	1.84 m (6 ft 0 in)	73 kg (161 lb)	328 cm (129 in)	304 cm (120 in)	(Poland) ZAKSA Kędzierzyn-Koźle
21	Rafał Buszek	28 April 1987	1.94 m (6 ft 4 in)	81 kg (179 lb)	345 cm (136 in)	327 cm (129 in)	(Poland) ZAKSA Kędzierzyn-Koźle
23	Mateusz Bieniek	5 April 1994	2.10 m (6 ft 11 in)	98 kg (216 lb)	351 cm (138 in)	326 cm (128 in)	(Poland) ZAKSA Kędzierzyn-Koźle
25	Artur Szalpuk	20 March 1995	2.01 m (6 ft 7 in)	93 kg (205 lb)	350 cm (140 in)	335 cm (132 in)	(Poland) PGE Skra Bełchatów

=== Russia ===
The following is the Russian roster in the 2017 World League.

Head coach: Sergey Shlyapnikov

No.	Name	Date of birth	Height	Weight	Spike	Block	2016–17 club
1	Sergey Antipkin	28 March 1986	1.97 m (6 ft 6 in)	92 kg (203 lb)	335 cm (132 in)	323 cm (127 in)	(Russia) Dinamo Moscow
2	Ilya Vlasov	3 August 1995	2.12 m (6 ft 11 in)	98 kg (216 lb)	360 cm (140 in)	345 cm (136 in)	(Russia) Fakel Novy Urengoy
3	Dmitry Kovalyov (C)	15 March 1991	1.98 m (6 ft 6 in)	82 kg (181 lb)	340 cm (130 in)	330 cm (130 in)	(Russia) Ural Ufa
4	Pavel Pankov	14 August 1995	1.98 m (6 ft 6 in)	90 kg (200 lb)	345 cm (136 in)	330 cm (130 in)	(Russia) Kuzbass Kemerovo
5	Roman Martynyuk (L)	13 April 1987	1.82 m (6 ft 0 in)	75 kg (165 lb)	320 cm (130 in)	310 cm (120 in)	(Russia) Belogorie Belgorod
6	Valentin Krotkov (L)	1 September 1991	1.95 m (6 ft 5 in)	84 kg (185 lb)	340 cm (130 in)	330 cm (130 in)	(Russia) Zenit Kazan
7	Dmitry Volkov	25 May 1995	2.01 m (6 ft 7 in)	88 kg (194 lb)	340 cm (130 in)	330 cm (130 in)	(Russia) Fakel Novy Urengoy
8	Denis Biryukov	8 December 1988	2.02 m (6 ft 8 in)	93 kg (205 lb)	352 cm (139 in)	324 cm (128 in)	(Russia) Dinamo Moscow
9	Alexander Chefranov	14 January 1987	2.05 m (6 ft 9 in)	92 kg (203 lb)	349 cm (137 in)	323 cm (127 in)	(Russia) Gazprom-Ugra Surgut
10	Egor Feoktistov	22 June 1993	2.01 m (6 ft 7 in)	90 kg (200 lb)	340 cm (130 in)	330 cm (130 in)	(Russia) Ural Ufa
11	Vadim Likhosherstov	23 January 1989	2.15 m (7 ft 1 in)	104 kg (229 lb)	356 cm (140 in)	336 cm (132 in)	(Russia) Fakel Novy Urengoy
14	Dmitry Shcherbinin	10 September 1989	2.05 m (6 ft 9 in)	95 kg (209 lb)	350 cm (140 in)	335 cm (132 in)	(Russia) Dinamo Moscow
16	Alexander Kimerov	11 September 1996	2.15 m (7 ft 1 in)	103 kg (227 lb)	355 cm (140 in)	335 cm (132 in)	(Russia) Fakel Novy Urengoy
17	Dmitry Ilinikh	31 January 1987	2.01 m (6 ft 7 in)	92 kg (203 lb)	338 cm (133 in)	330 cm (130 in)	(Russia) Dinamo Moscow
18	Maxim Zhigalov	26 July 1989	2.01 m (6 ft 7 in)	85 kg (187 lb)	345 cm (136 in)	330 cm (130 in)	(Russia) Belogorie Belgorod
19	Egor Kliuka	15 June 1995	2.08 m (6 ft 10 in)	93 kg (205 lb)	360 cm (140 in)	350 cm (140 in)	(Russia) Fakel Novy Urengoy
20	Ilyas Kurkaev	18 January 1994	2.07 m (6 ft 9 in)	95 kg (209 lb)	355 cm (140 in)	335 cm (132 in)	(Russia) Lokomotiv Novosibirsk
21	Artem Zelenkov (L)	6 August 1987	1.84 m (6 ft 0 in)	80 kg (180 lb)	310 cm (120 in)	295 cm (116 in)	(Russia) Dinamo Krasnodar

=== Serbia ===
The following is the Serbian roster in the 2017 World League.

Head coach: Nikola Grbić

No.	Name	Date of birth	Height	Weight	Spike	Block	2016–17 club
1	Aleksandar Okolić	26 June 1993	2.05 m (6 ft 9 in)	90 kg (200 lb)	347 cm (137 in)	320 cm (130 in)	(Germany) Berlin Recycling Volleys
2	Uroš Kovačević	6 May 1993	1.97 m (6 ft 6 in)	90 kg (200 lb)	340 cm (130 in)	320 cm (130 in)	(Italy) Calzedonia Verona
3	Milan Katić	22 October 1993	2.02 m (6 ft 8 in)	99 kg (218 lb)	345 cm (136 in)	331 cm (130 in)	(Poland) Łuczniczka Bydgoszcz
4	Nemanja Petrić (C)	28 July 1987	2.02 m (6 ft 8 in)	86 kg (190 lb)	333 cm (131 in)	320 cm (130 in)	(Italy) Azimut Modena
5	Aleksa Brđović	29 July 1993	2.04 m (6 ft 8 in)	90 kg (200 lb)	355 cm (140 in)	330 cm (130 in)	(Russia) Gazprom-Ugra Surgut
6	Goran Škundrić	23 November 1987	1.97 m (6 ft 6 in)	94 kg (207 lb)	340 cm (130 in)	320 cm (130 in)	(Romania) CS Tricolorul Ploiești
8	Marko Ivović	22 December 1990	1.94 m (6 ft 4 in)	89 kg (196 lb)	365 cm (144 in)	330 cm (130 in)	(Poland) Asseco Resovia Rzeszów
9	Nikola Jovović	13 February 1992	1.97 m (6 ft 6 in)	75 kg (165 lb)	335 cm (132 in)	315 cm (124 in)	(Italy) Gi Group Monza
10	Miran Kujundžić	19 June 1997	1.96 m (6 ft 5 in)	86 kg (190 lb)	348 cm (137 in)	334 cm (131 in)	(Serbia) OK Vojvodina
11	Maksim Buculjević	20 September 1991	1.92 m (6 ft 4 in)	83 kg (183 lb)	320 cm (130 in)	307 cm (121 in)	(Slovenia) ACH Volley Ljubljana
12	Aleksandar Blagojević	5 August 1993	1.97 m (6 ft 6 in)	87 kg (192 lb)	330 cm (130 in)	310 cm (120 in)	(Serbia) OK Crvena Zvezda
13	Stevan Simić	21 March 1996	2.01 m (6 ft 7 in)	85 kg (187 lb)	330 cm (130 in)	315 cm (124 in)	(Serbia) OK Vojvodina
14	Aleksandar Atanasijević	4 September 1991	2.00 m (6 ft 7 in)	92 kg (203 lb)	350 cm (140 in)	329 cm (130 in)	(Italy) Sir Sicoma Colussi Perugia
16	Dražen Luburić	2 November 1993	2.02 m (6 ft 8 in)	90 kg (200 lb)	337 cm (133 in)	331 cm (130 in)	(Japan) JT Thunders
17	Neven Majstorović	17 March 1989	1.93 m (6 ft 4 in)	90 kg (200 lb)	335 cm (132 in)	325 cm (128 in)	(France) Rennes 35
18	Marko Podraščanin	29 August 1987	2.03 m (6 ft 8 in)	100 kg (220 lb)	354 cm (139 in)	332 cm (131 in)	(Italy) Sir Sicoma Colussi Perugia
20	Srećko Lisinac	17 May 1992	2.05 m (6 ft 9 in)	90 kg (200 lb)	355 cm (140 in)	342 cm (135 in)	(Poland) PGE Skra Bełchatów
21	Petar Krsmanović	1 June 1990	2.05 m (6 ft 9 in)	98 kg (216 lb)	354 cm (139 in)	330 cm (130 in)	(Russia) Gazprom-Ugra Surgut

=== United States ===
The following is the American roster in the 2017 World League.

Head coach: John Speraw

No.	Name	Date of birth	Height	Weight	Spike	Block	2016–17 club
1	Thomas Carmody	24 November 1992	2.08 m (6 ft 10 in)	107 kg (236 lb)	373 cm (147 in)	356 cm (140 in)	(Finland) Vammalan Lentopallo
3	Taylor Sander	17 March 1992	1.96 m (6 ft 5 in)	80 kg (180 lb)	345 cm (136 in)	320 cm (130 in)	(Qatar) Al Arabi
4	Jeffrey Jendryk	15 September 1995	2.08 m (6 ft 10 in)	89 kg (196 lb)	353 cm (139 in)	345 cm (136 in)	(United States) Loyola University Chicago
5	James Shaw	5 March 1994	2.03 m (6 ft 8 in)	98 kg (216 lb)	354 cm (139 in)	338 cm (133 in)	(United States) Stanford University
7	Kawika Shoji (C)	11 November 1987	1.90 m (6 ft 3 in)	79 kg (174 lb)	331 cm (130 in)	315 cm (124 in)	(Russia) Lokomotiv Novosibirsk
9	Jake Langlois	14 May 1992	2.08 m (6 ft 10 in)	93 kg (205 lb)	365 cm (144 in)	355 cm (140 in)	(United States) Brigham Young University
10	Thomas Jaeschke	4 September 1993	1.98 m (6 ft 6 in)	84 kg (185 lb)	348 cm (137 in)	330 cm (130 in)	(Poland) Asseco Resovia Rzeszów
11	Micah Christenson	8 May 1993	1.98 m (6 ft 6 in)	88 kg (194 lb)	349 cm (137 in)	340 cm (130 in)	(Italy) Cucine Lube Civitanova
13	Daniel Mcdonnell	15 September 1988	2.00 m (6 ft 7 in)	90 kg (200 lb)	355 cm (140 in)	345 cm (136 in)	(France) Chaumont 52
14	Benjamin Patch	21 June 1994	2.03 m (6 ft 8 in)	90 kg (200 lb)	368 cm (145 in)	348 cm (137 in)	(United States) Brigham Young University
15	Carson Clark	20 January 1989	2.05 m (6 ft 9 in)	93 kg (205 lb)	365 cm (144 in)	360 cm (140 in)	Free agent
16	Jayson Jablonsky	23 July 1985	1.98 m (6 ft 6 in)	91 kg (201 lb)	345 cm (136 in)	335 cm (132 in)	(Bahrain) Al-Muharraq
17	Torey Defalco	10 April 1997	1.98 m (6 ft 6 in)	95 kg (209 lb)	340 cm (130 in)	328 cm (129 in)	(United States) California State University, Long Beach
18	Garrett Muagututia	26 February 1988	2.05 m (6 ft 9 in)	92 kg (203 lb)	359 cm (141 in)	345 cm (136 in)	(China) Tianjin
19	Taylor Averill	3 May 1992	2.01 m (6 ft 7 in)	94 kg (207 lb)	370 cm (150 in)	330 cm (130 in)	(Italy) Kioene Padova
20	David Smith	15 May 1985	2.01 m (6 ft 7 in)	86 kg (190 lb)	348 cm (137 in)	314 cm (124 in)	(Poland) Czarni Radom
21	Dustin Watten	27 October 1986	1.82 m (6 ft 0 in)	80 kg (180 lb)	306 cm (120 in)	295 cm (116 in)	(Poland) Czarni Radom
22	Erik Shoji	24 August 1989	1.84 m (6 ft 0 in)	83 kg (183 lb)	330 cm (130 in)	321 cm (126 in)	(Russia) Lokomotiv Novosibirsk

== Group 2 ==
=== Australia ===
The following is the Australian roster in the 2017 World League.

Head coach: Mark Lebedew

No.	Name	Date of birth	Height	Weight	Spike	Block	2016–17 club
1	Beau Graham	17 April 1994	2.02 m (6 ft 8 in)	86 kg (190 lb)	351 cm (138 in)	332 cm (131 in)	(Greece) Pamvohaikos
2	Arshdeep Dosanjh	30 July 1996	2.05 m (6 ft 9 in)	85 kg (187 lb)	347 cm (137 in)	335 cm (132 in)	(Finland) Team Lakkapää
3	Nathan Roberts	17 February 1986	1.99 m (6 ft 6 in)	90 kg (200 lb)	342 cm (135 in)	328 cm (129 in)	(Poland) MKS Będzin
4	Paul Sanderson	7 January 1986	1.95 m (6 ft 5 in)	94 kg (207 lb)	348 cm (137 in)	335 cm (132 in)	(Indonesia) Jakarta Pertamina Energi
5	Travis Passier	26 April 1989	2.06 m (6 ft 9 in)	99 kg (218 lb)	351 cm (138 in)	340 cm (130 in)	Free agent
7	Harrison Peacock	31 January 1991	1.92 m (6 ft 4 in)	87 kg (192 lb)	353 cm (139 in)	359 cm (141 in)	(Finland) Hurrikaani Loimaa
8	Trent O'Dea	11 May 1994	2.01 m (6 ft 7 in)	98 kg (216 lb)	354 cm (139 in)	344 cm (135 in)	(Sweden) Örkelljunga
9	Max Staples	27 July 1994	1.94 m (6 ft 4 in)	83 kg (183 lb)	358 cm (141 in)	345 cm (136 in)	(Netherlands) Draisma Dynamo
10	Jordan Richards	25 September 1993	1.93 m (6 ft 4 in)	80 kg (180 lb)	354 cm (139 in)	342 cm (135 in)	(Italy) Libertas Brianza Cantù
11	Luke Perry	20 November 1995	1.80 m (5 ft 11 in)	75 kg (165 lb)	331 cm (130 in)	315 cm (124 in)	(Germany) Berlin Recycling Volleys
13	Samuel Walker	19 February 1995	2.08 m (6 ft 10 in)	90 kg (200 lb)	350 cm (140 in)	337 cm (133 in)	(Belgium) Euphony Asse-Lennik
14	Simon Hone	24 April 1993	1.97 m (6 ft 6 in)	90 kg (200 lb)	345 cm (136 in)	330 cm (130 in)	(Sweden) Vingåkers
15	Luke Smith	30 August 1990	2.04 m (6 ft 8 in)	95 kg (209 lb)	360 cm (140 in)	342 cm (135 in)	(Finland) Hurrikaani Loimaa
16	Thomas Douglas-Powell	16 September 1992	1.94 m (6 ft 4 in)	82 kg (181 lb)	356 cm (140 in)	332 cm (131 in)	(Belgium) Topvolley Precura Antwerpen
17	Paul Carroll (C)	16 May 1986	2.07 m (6 ft 9 in)	98 kg (216 lb)	354 cm (139 in)	340 cm (130 in)	(Germany) Berlin Recycling Volleys
18	Lincoln Williams	6 October 1993	2.00 m (6 ft 7 in)	104 kg (229 lb)	353 cm (139 in)	330 cm (130 in)	(Estonia) Selver Tallinn
19	Carsten Moeller	12 June 1991	1.94 m (6 ft 4 in)	88 kg (194 lb)	340 cm (130 in)	330 cm (130 in)	(Sweden) Södertelge
21	James Weir	20 July 1995	2.04 m (6 ft 8 in)	95 kg (209 lb)	348 cm (137 in)	342 cm (135 in)	(Australia) Brandon University

=== China ===
The following is the Chinese roster in the 2017 World League. Before the match began, Miao Ruantong replaced Geng Xin.

Head coach: Raúl Lozano

No.	Name	Date of birth	Height	Weight	Spike	Block	2016–17 club
1	Li Rui	15 March 1990	2.07 m (6 ft 9 in)	86 kg (190 lb)	350 cm (140 in)	330 cm (130 in)	(China) Henan
2	Jiang Chuan	9 August 1994	2.05 m (6 ft 9 in)	91 kg (201 lb)	353 cm (139 in)	335 cm (132 in)	(China) Beijing
3	Mao Tianyi	2 June 1993	2.00 m (6 ft 7 in)	90 kg (200 lb)	350 cm (140 in)	333 cm (131 in)	(China) Bayi
4	Zhang Chen	28 June 1985	2.00 m (6 ft 7 in)	89 kg (196 lb)	356 cm (140 in)	340 cm (130 in)	(China) Jiangsu
5	Zhang Binglong	11 September 1994	1.97 m (6 ft 6 in)	99 kg (218 lb)	350 cm (140 in)	340 cm (130 in)	(China) Beijing
6	Li Runming	1 March 1990	1.98 m (6 ft 6 in)	90 kg (200 lb)	350 cm (140 in)	326 cm (128 in)	(China) Shandong
7	Zhong Weijun (C)	20 April 1989	2.00 m (6 ft 7 in)	95 kg (209 lb)	347 cm (137 in)	335 cm (132 in)	(China) Bayi
8	Han Tianyi	26 October 1995	1.98 m (6 ft 6 in)	85 kg (187 lb)	350 cm (140 in)	320 cm (130 in)	(China) Shanghai Golden Age
9	Zhan Guojun	16 December 1988	1.97 m (6 ft 6 in)	85 kg (187 lb)	235 cm (93 in)	230 cm (91 in)	(China) Shanghai Golden Age
10	Ji Daoshuai	7 February 1992	1.94 m (6 ft 4 in)	82 kg (181 lb)	355 cm (140 in)	335 cm (132 in)	(China) Shandong
13	Chen Longhai	29 March 1991	2.01 m (6 ft 7 in)	85 kg (187 lb)	351 cm (138 in)	340 cm (130 in)	(China) Shanghai Golden Age
14	Ke Junhuang	28 June 1994	1.84 m (6 ft 0 in)	70 kg (150 lb)	330 cm (130 in)	320 cm (130 in)	(China) Fujian
15	Tang Chuanhang	4 October 1995	2.02 m (6 ft 8 in)	92 kg (203 lb)	345 cm (136 in)	340 cm (130 in)	(China) Bayi
16	Tong Jiahua	13 December 1992	1.80 m (5 ft 11 in)	76 kg (168 lb)	317 cm (125 in)	305 cm (120 in)	(China) Shanghai Golden Age
17	Liu Libin	16 February 1995	1.97 m (6 ft 6 in)	90 kg (200 lb)	350 cm (140 in)	342 cm (135 in)	(China) Beijing
18	Kou Zhichao	26 June 1989	2.02 m (6 ft 8 in)	92 kg (203 lb)	355 cm (140 in)	345 cm (136 in)	(China) Shandong
20	Rao Shuhan	23 December 1996	2.05 m (6 ft 9 in)	85 kg (187 lb)	354 cm (139 in)	344 cm (135 in)	(China) Fujian
21	Miao Ruantong	21 May 1995	2.05 m (6 ft 9 in)	88 kg (194 lb)	354 cm (139 in)	345 cm (136 in)	(China) Hubei

=== Czech Republic ===
The following is the Czech roster in the 2017 World League.

Head coach: Miguel Ángel Falasca

No.	Name	Date of birth	Height	Weight	Spike	Block	2016–17 club
2	Jan Hadrava	3 June 1991	1.98 m (6 ft 6 in)	101 kg (223 lb)	357 cm (141 in)	335 cm (132 in)	(Poland) Indykpol AZS Olsztyn
3	Marek Beer	24 May 1988	2.01 m (6 ft 7 in)	103 kg (227 lb)	350 cm (140 in)	335 cm (132 in)	(Austria) Hypo Tirol Innsbruck
4	Donovan Džavoronok	23 July 1997	2.02 m (6 ft 8 in)	85 kg (187 lb)	345 cm (136 in)	334 cm (131 in)	(Italy) Gi Group Monza
5	Petr Šulista	29 April 1993	1.99 m (6 ft 6 in)	88 kg (194 lb)	350 cm (140 in)	335 cm (132 in)	(Czech Republic) Vaše Kladno
6	Michal Finger	2 September 1993	2.02 m (6 ft 8 in)	92 kg (203 lb)	366 cm (144 in)	341 cm (134 in)	(Germany) Friedrichshafen
7	Aleš Holubec (C)	13 March 1984	1.99 m (6 ft 6 in)	90 kg (200 lb)	357 cm (141 in)	335 cm (132 in)	(France) Nantes Rezé Métropole
8	Filip Habr	27 April 1988	2.02 m (6 ft 8 in)	93 kg (205 lb)	348 cm (137 in)	335 cm (132 in)	(Czech Republic) České Budějovice
9	Marek Zmrhal	10 August 1993	2.03 m (6 ft 8 in)	94 kg (207 lb)	357 cm (141 in)	337 cm (133 in)	(Czech Republic) Volejbal Brno
10	Matyáš Démar	1 October 1991	2.04 m (6 ft 8 in)	98 kg (216 lb)	340 cm (130 in)	330 cm (130 in)	(France) Nantes Rezé Métropole
12	Daniel Pfeffer	27 April 1990	1.84 m (6 ft 0 in)	80 kg (180 lb)	331 cm (130 in)	322 cm (127 in)	(Czech Republic) Karlovarsko
13	Jan Galabov	12 June 1996	1.91 m (6 ft 3 in)	90 kg (200 lb)	354 cm (139 in)	320 cm (130 in)	(Czech Republic) Dukla Liberec
14	Adam Bartoš	27 April 1992	1.98 m (6 ft 6 in)	90 kg (200 lb)	359 cm (141 in)	335 cm (132 in)	(Poland) Bielsko-Biała
15	Vladimír Sobotka	7 May 1985	2.03 m (6 ft 8 in)	93 kg (205 lb)	350 cm (140 in)	328 cm (129 in)	(Czech Republic) České Budějovice
16	Matěj Šmídl	25 February 1997	2.05 m (6 ft 9 in)	105 kg (231 lb)	350 cm (140 in)	335 cm (132 in)	(Czech Republic) Ostrava
17	Adam Zajíček	25 February 1993	2.01 m (6 ft 7 in)	92 kg (203 lb)	345 cm (136 in)	331 cm (130 in)	(Czech Republic) Vaše Kladno
18	Jakub Janouch	13 June 1990	1.94 m (6 ft 4 in)	90 kg (200 lb)	336 cm (132 in)	320 cm (130 in)	(Czech Republic) Dukla Liberec
19	Petr Michálek	19 August 1989	1.90 m (6 ft 3 in)	80 kg (180 lb)	344 cm (135 in)	325 cm (128 in)	(Czech Republic) České Budějovice
21	Filip Křesťan	15 December 1987	2.00 m (6 ft 7 in)	94 kg (207 lb)	348 cm (137 in)	330 cm (130 in)	(Czech Republic) Vaše Kladno

=== Egypt ===
The following is the Egyptian roster in the 2017 World League.

Head coach: Ibrahim Fakhreldin

No.	Name	Date of birth	Height	Weight	Spike	Block	2016–17 club
1	Ahmed El Sayed	14 January 1991	1.84 m (6 ft 0 in)	84 kg (185 lb)	325 cm (128 in)	312 cm (123 in)	(Egypt) Tala'ea El-Gaish
3	Abd Elhalim Mohamed Abou	3 June 1989	2.10 m (6 ft 11 in)	80 kg (180 lb)	360 cm (140 in)	345 cm (136 in)	(Egypt) Al Ahly
4	Ahmed Abdelhay (C)	19 August 1984	1.97 m (6 ft 6 in)	87 kg (192 lb)	342 cm (135 in)	316 cm (124 in)	(Egypt) Tala'ea El-Gaish
6	Mamdouh Abdelrehim	5 August 1989	2.07 m (6 ft 9 in)	96 kg (212 lb)	338 cm (133 in)	328 cm (129 in)	(Egypt) Tala'ea El-Gaish
7	Hisham Ewais	26 February 1995	1.96 m (6 ft 5 in)	75 kg (165 lb)	346 cm (136 in)	322 cm (127 in)	(Egypt) Al Tayaran
8	Marawan Abdelbaky	15 February 1992	1.93 m (6 ft 4 in)	82 kg (181 lb)	336 cm (132 in)	325 cm (128 in)	(Egypt) Smouha
9	Ahmed Maghrawy	21 March 1990	1.96 m (6 ft 5 in)	93 kg (205 lb)	340 cm (130 in)	330 cm (130 in)	(Egypt) Al Ahly
10	Mohamed Masoud	1 May 1994	2.11 m (6 ft 11 in)	105 kg (231 lb)	358 cm (141 in)	342 cm (135 in)	(Egypt) Al Ahly
12	Hossam Abdalla	16 February 1988	2.03 m (6 ft 8 in)	97 kg (214 lb)	343 cm (135 in)	321 cm (126 in)	(Egypt) Al Ahly
14	Omar Hassan	4 April 1991	1.91 m (6 ft 3 in)	104 kg (229 lb)	333 cm (131 in)	324 cm (128 in)	(Egypt) Tala'ea El-Gaish
15	Ahmed Elkotb	23 July 1991	1.97 m (6 ft 6 in)	80 kg (180 lb)	328 cm (129 in)	318 cm (125 in)	(Egypt) Al Ahly
17	Ahmed Bekhet	15 October 1995	1.91 m (6 ft 3 in)	80 kg (180 lb)	320 cm (130 in)	301 cm (119 in)	(Egypt) Gezira
19	Mostafa Mohamed Ibrahim Abdelrahman	25 January 1994	1.97 m (6 ft 6 in)	87 kg (192 lb)	348 cm (137 in)	336 cm (132 in)	(Egypt) Zamalek
20	Ahmed Shafik	7 December 1994	1.90 m (6 ft 3 in)	97 kg (214 lb)	349 cm (137 in)	323 cm (127 in)	(Egypt) Al Ahly
21	Sherif Aly	24 April 1994	1.85 m (6 ft 1 in)	77 kg (170 lb)	333 cm (131 in)	317 cm (125 in)	(Egypt) Al Ahly
22	Ahmed Abdelaal	8 June 1989	1.88 m (6 ft 2 in)	89 kg (196 lb)	325 cm (128 in)	312 cm (123 in)	(Egypt) Tala'ea El-Gaish
23	Abdelrahman Seoudy	21 August 1997	2.06 m (6 ft 9 in)	100 kg (220 lb)	344 cm (135 in)	332 cm (131 in)	(Egypt) Al Ahly
25	Abdelrahman Abouelella	15 September 1996	2.09 m (6 ft 10 in)	117 kg (258 lb)	334 cm (131 in)	320 cm (130 in)	(Egypt) Aviation Club

=== Finland ===
The following is the Finnish roster in the 2017 World League.

Head coach: Tuomas Sammelvuo

No.	Name	Date of birth	Height	Weight	Spike	Block	2016–17 club
1	Niko Haapakoski	1 May 1996	1.92 m (6 ft 4 in)	74 kg (163 lb)	325 cm (128 in)	312 cm (123 in)	(Finland) Lentopalloseura ETTA
2	Eemi Tervaportti (C)	26 July 1989	1.93 m (6 ft 4 in)	80 kg (180 lb)	338 cm (133 in)	317 cm (125 in)	(France) Tours
4	Lauri Kerminen	18 January 1993	1.85 m (6 ft 1 in)	80 kg (180 lb)	332 cm (131 in)	290 cm (110 in)	(Russia) Kuzbass Kemerovo
5	Peetu Mäkinen	19 August 1995	2.00 m (6 ft 7 in)	84 kg (185 lb)	330 cm (130 in)	310 cm (120 in)	(Finland) Vammalan Lentopallo
6	Niklas Seppänen	30 June 1993	1.93 m (6 ft 4 in)	84 kg (185 lb)	335 cm (132 in)	320 cm (130 in)	(France) Tours
7	Eemeli Kouki	26 October 1991	1.94 m (6 ft 4 in)	84 kg (185 lb)	340 cm (130 in)	330 cm (130 in)	(Finland) Hurrikaani Loimaa
8	Elviss Krastins	15 September 1994	1.92 m (6 ft 4 in)	85 kg (187 lb)	335 cm (132 in)	315 cm (124 in)	(Belgium) Topvolley Precura Antwerpen
9	Tommi Siirilä	5 August 1993	2.03 m (6 ft 8 in)	102 kg (225 lb)	350 cm (140 in)	325 cm (128 in)	(France) GFCO Ajaccio
10	Urpo Sivula	15 March 1988	1.95 m (6 ft 5 in)	100 kg (220 lb)	350 cm (140 in)	330 cm (130 in)	(Finland) Vammalan Lentopallo
11	Sauli Sinkkonen	14 September 1989	2.01 m (6 ft 7 in)	94 kg (207 lb)	345 cm (136 in)	330 cm (130 in)	(Belgium) Topvolley Precura Antwerpen
12	Jan Helenius	13 October 1996	1.83 m (6 ft 0 in)	74 kg (163 lb)	320 cm (130 in)	300 cm (120 in)	(Finland) LEKA Volley
13	Antti Ropponen	17 August 1995	1.90 m (6 ft 3 in)	87 kg (192 lb)	340 cm (130 in)	318 cm (125 in)	(Finland) Kokkolan Tiikerit
14	Markus Kaurto	31 August 1993	1.96 m (6 ft 5 in)	85 kg (187 lb)	345 cm (136 in)	320 cm (130 in)	(Finland) Lentopalloseura ETTA
15	Henrik Porkka	14 January 1998	2.02 m (6 ft 8 in)	82 kg (181 lb)	360 cm (140 in)	330 cm (130 in)	(Finland) LEKA Volley
16	Olli-Pekka Ojansivu	31 December 1987	1.97 m (6 ft 6 in)	90 kg (200 lb)	344 cm (135 in)	325 cm (128 in)	(Russia) Kuzbass Kemerovo
18	Miki Jauhiainen	8 July 1997	2.05 m (6 ft 9 in)	85 kg (187 lb)	355 cm (140 in)	325 cm (128 in)	(United States) Brigham Young University
19	Eetu Pennanen	18 September 1992	1.83 m (6 ft 0 in)	78 kg (172 lb)	335 cm (132 in)	318 cm (125 in)	(Finland) Lentopalloseura ETTA
21	Akseli Lankinen	31 August 1997	1.94 m (6 ft 4 in)	77 kg (170 lb)	335 cm (132 in)	315 cm (124 in)	(Finland) LEKA Volley

=== Japan ===
The following is the Japanese roster in the 2017 World League.

Head coach: Yuichi Nakagaichi

No.	Name	Date of birth	Height	Weight	Spike	Block	2016–17 club
2	Hideomi Fukatsu (C)	1 June 1990	1.80 m (5 ft 11 in)	70 kg (150 lb)	330 cm (130 in)	305 cm (120 in)	(Japan) Panasonic Panthers
6	Akihiro Yamauchi	30 November 1993	2.04 m (6 ft 8 in)	72 kg (159 lb)	348 cm (137 in)	328 cm (129 in)	(Japan) Panasonic Panthers
7	Takashi Dekita	13 August 1991	1.99 m (6 ft 6 in)	92 kg (203 lb)	350 cm (140 in)	330 cm (130 in)	(Japan) Osaka Blazers Sakai
8	Masahiro Yanagida	6 July 1992	1.86 m (6 ft 1 in)	78 kg (172 lb)	335 cm (132 in)	305 cm (120 in)	(Japan) Suntory Sunbirds
9	Masashi Kuriyama	14 July 1988	1.90 m (6 ft 3 in)	89 kg (196 lb)	340 cm (130 in)	330 cm (130 in)	(Japan) Suntory Sunbirds
10	Shuzo Yamada	27 November 1992	1.93 m (6 ft 4 in)	78 kg (172 lb)	340 cm (130 in)	323 cm (127 in)	(Japan) Toyoda Gosei Trefuerza
12	Takuya Takamatsu	8 January 1988	1.86 m (6 ft 1 in)	78 kg (172 lb)	341 cm (134 in)	320 cm (130 in)	(Japan) Toyoda Gosei Trefuerza
13	Naoya Takano	30 April 1993	1.91 m (6 ft 3 in)	72 kg (159 lb)	335 cm (132 in)	320 cm (130 in)	(Japan) Osaka Blazers Sakai
14	Yūki Ishikawa	11 December 1995	1.91 m (6 ft 3 in)	82 kg (181 lb)	345 cm (136 in)	330 cm (130 in)	(Japan) Chuo University
15	Haku Ri	27 December 1990	1.94 m (6 ft 4 in)	83 kg (183 lb)	347 cm (137 in)	325 cm (128 in)	(Japan) Toray Arrows
17	Masahiro Sekita	20 November 1993	1.77 m (5 ft 10 in)	70 kg (150 lb)	320 cm (130 in)	305 cm (120 in)	(Japan) Panasonic Panthers
18	Yuji Suzuki	7 June 1986	1.89 m (6 ft 2 in)	80 kg (180 lb)	350 cm (140 in)	330 cm (130 in)	(Japan) Toray Arrows
19	Hiroaki Asano	6 October 1990	1.78 m (5 ft 10 in)	69 kg (152 lb)	335 cm (132 in)	315 cm (124 in)	(Japan) JTEKT Stings
21	Naonobu Fujii	5 January 1992	1.83 m (6 ft 0 in)	78 kg (172 lb)	320 cm (130 in)	305 cm (120 in)	(Japan) Toray Arrows
22	Satoshi Ide	16 January 1992	1.74 m (5 ft 9 in)	70 kg (150 lb)	305 cm (120 in)	300 cm (120 in)	(Japan) Toray Arrows
23	Taiki Tsuruda	13 July 1991	1.77 m (5 ft 10 in)	73 kg (161 lb)	330 cm (130 in)	305 cm (120 in)	(Japan) Suntory Sunbirds
25	Taishi Onodera	27 February 1996	2.02 m (6 ft 8 in)	97 kg (214 lb)	330 cm (130 in)	320 cm (130 in)	(Japan) Tokai University
26	Issei Otake	3 December 1995	2.02 m (6 ft 8 in)	91 kg (201 lb)	330 cm (130 in)	320 cm (130 in)	(Japan) Chuo University

=== Netherlands ===
The following is the Dutch roster in the 2017 World League.

Head coach: Gido Vermeulen

No.	Name	Date of birth	Height	Weight	Spike	Block	2016–17 club
1	Daan van Haarlem	15 March 1989	1.98 m (6 ft 6 in)	89 kg (196 lb)	332 cm (131 in)	323 cm (127 in)	(Czech Republic) Vaše Kladno
2	Wessel Keemink	29 May 1993	1.97 m (6 ft 6 in)	81 kg (179 lb)	337 cm (133 in)	326 cm (128 in)	(Netherlands) Draisma Dynamo
3	Dirk Sparidans	5 March 1989	1.81 m (5 ft 11 in)	86 kg (190 lb)	326 cm (128 in)	300 cm (120 in)	(Czech Republic) Vaše Kladno
4	Thijs ter Horst	18 September 1991	2.04 m (6 ft 8 in)	94 kg (207 lb)	364 cm (143 in)	344 cm (135 in)	(South Korea) Daejeon Samsung Bluefangs
5	Auke van de Kamp	31 July 1995	2.01 m (6 ft 7 in)	91 kg (201 lb)	345 cm (136 in)	322 cm (127 in)	(Netherlands) Abiant Lycurgus
6	Jasper Diefenbach (C)	17 March 1988	1.95 m (6 ft 5 in)	90 kg (200 lb)	345 cm (136 in)	330 cm (130 in)	(France) Nantes Rezé Métropole
7	Gijs Jorna	30 May 1989	1.96 m (6 ft 5 in)	85 kg (187 lb)	340 cm (130 in)	310 cm (120 in)	(France) Chaumont 52
8	Fabian Plak	23 July 1997	1.97 m (6 ft 6 in)	83 kg (183 lb)	330 cm (130 in)	326 cm (128 in)	(Netherlands) TalentTeam Papendal Arnhem
10	Jeroen Rauwerdink	13 September 1985	2.00 m (6 ft 7 in)	92 kg (203 lb)	350 cm (140 in)	320 cm (130 in)	(Turkey) Ziraat Bankası Ankara
11	Robin Overbeeke	21 March 1989	1.98 m (6 ft 6 in)	92 kg (203 lb)	347 cm (137 in)	328 cm (129 in)	(France) Nantes Rezé Métropole
14	Nimir Abdel-Aziz	5 February 1992	2.01 m (6 ft 7 in)	86 kg (190 lb)	365 cm (144 in)	350 cm (140 in)	(France) Stade Poitevin Poitiers
15	Thomas Koelewijn	18 December 1988	2.06 m (6 ft 9 in)	100 kg (220 lb)	360 cm (140 in)	350 cm (140 in)	(France) Montpellier
16	Wouter ter Maat	7 May 1991	2.00 m (6 ft 7 in)	90 kg (200 lb)	351 cm (138 in)	338 cm (133 in)	(Germany) Berlin Recycling Volleys
17	Michaël Parkinson	23 November 1991	2.03 m (6 ft 8 in)	98 kg (216 lb)	365 cm (144 in)	350 cm (140 in)	(Belgium) Euphony Asse-Lennik
18	Robbert Andringa	28 April 1990	1.92 m (6 ft 4 in)	85 kg (187 lb)	330 cm (130 in)	310 cm (120 in)	(France) Stade Poitevin Poitiers
19	Just Dronkers	7 June 1993	1.87 m (6 ft 2 in)	78 kg (172 lb)	330 cm (130 in)	308 cm (121 in)	(Netherlands) Abiant Lycurgus
20	Stijn Held	3 November 1994	1.96 m (6 ft 5 in)	82 kg (181 lb)	331 cm (130 in)	321 cm (126 in)	(Netherlands) Orion Doetinchem
21	Stijn van Schie	19 February 1995	2.00 m (6 ft 7 in)	89 kg (196 lb)	350 cm (140 in)	337 cm (133 in)	(Netherlands) Abiant Lycurgus

=== Portugal ===
The following is the Portuguese roster in the 2017 World League.

Head coach: Hugo Silva

No.	Name	Date of birth	Height	Weight	Spike	Block	2016–17 club
1	Marcel Keller Gil	8 May 1990	2.08 m (6 ft 10 in)	94 kg (207 lb)	352 cm (139 in)	332 cm (131 in)	(Romania) Craiova
2	Simão Moreira	11 March 1998	1.80 m (5 ft 11 in)	65 kg (143 lb)	298 cm (117 in)	280 cm (110 in)	(Portugal) José Moreira
3	Afonso Guerreiro	28 December 1994	1.97 m (6 ft 6 in)	70 kg (150 lb)	319 cm (126 in)	300 cm (120 in)	(Portugal) Fonte do Bastardo
4	Filip Cveticanin	19 June 1996	1.99 m (6 ft 6 in)	90 kg (200 lb)	320 cm (130 in)	310 cm (120 in)	(Portugal) Castêlo da Maia
5	Marco Ferreira	4 October 1987	2.02 m (6 ft 8 in)	94 kg (207 lb)	359 cm (141 in)	337 cm (133 in)	(Portugal) Espinho
6	Alexandre Ferreira (C)	13 November 1991	2.02 m (6 ft 8 in)	87 kg (192 lb)	361 cm (142 in)	346 cm (136 in)	(Italy) Calzedonia Verona
7	Ivo Casas	21 September 1992	1.80 m (5 ft 11 in)	71 kg (157 lb)	290 cm (110 in)	278 cm (109 in)	(Portugal) Benfica
8	Tiago Violas	27 March 1989	1.93 m (6 ft 4 in)	82 kg (181 lb)	326 cm (128 in)	303 cm (119 in)	(Portugal) Benfica
9	João Simões	11 June 1986	1.94 m (6 ft 4 in)	85 kg (187 lb)	325 cm (128 in)	315 cm (124 in)	(Portugal) Espinho
10	Phelipe Martins	2 March 1991	2.01 m (6 ft 7 in)	91 kg (201 lb)	307 cm (121 in)	289 cm (114 in)	(Portugal) Caldas
11	João Oliveira	31 July 1995	1.96 m (6 ft 5 in)	80 kg (180 lb)	330 cm (130 in)	318 cm (125 in)	(Portugal) Vitória
12	Lourenço Martins	30 April 1997	1.95 m (6 ft 5 in)	78 kg (172 lb)	308 cm (121 in)	298 cm (117 in)	(Portugal) Castêlo da Maia
13	Valdir Sequeira	22 November 1981	1.96 m (6 ft 5 in)	86 kg (190 lb)	351 cm (138 in)	344 cm (135 in)	(Slovakia) Prievidza
14	Bruno Cunha	18 August 1997	1.93 m (6 ft 4 in)	90 kg (200 lb)	320 cm (130 in)	308 cm (121 in)	(Portugal) Vitória
15	Miguel Tavares Rodrigues	2 March 1993	1.92 m (6 ft 4 in)	68 kg (150 lb)	315 cm (124 in)	293 cm (115 in)	(France) Tourcoing Lille Métropole
16	Manuel Meirinho	22 September 1999	2.04 m (6 ft 8 in)	97 kg (214 lb)	330 cm (130 in)	320 cm (130 in)	(Portugal) Bragança
17	João Fidalgo	2 November 1986	1.72 m (5 ft 8 in)	67 kg (148 lb)	307 cm (121 in)	285 cm (112 in)	(Portugal) São Mamede
18	Frederico Santos	16 September 1997	1.87 m (6 ft 2 in)	63 kg (139 lb)	314 cm (124 in)	296 cm (117 in)	(Portugal) São Mamede

=== Slovakia ===
The following is the Slovak roster in the 2017 World League.

Head coach: Andrej Kravarik

No.	Name	Date of birth	Height	Weight	Spike	Block	2016–17 club
1	Milan Bencz	5 September 1987	2.06 m (6 ft 9 in)	99 kg (218 lb)	363 cm (143 in)	342 cm (135 in)	(France) Narbonne
2	Tomáš Kriško	19 December 1988	2.01 m (6 ft 7 in)	91 kg (201 lb)	350 cm (140 in)	328 cm (129 in)	(Czech Republic) Dukla Liberec
3	Emanuel Kohút (C)	21 July 1982	2.06 m (6 ft 9 in)	97 kg (214 lb)	359 cm (141 in)	345 cm (136 in)	(Poland) GKS Katowice
4	Peter Ondrovič	28 March 1995	1.99 m (6 ft 6 in)	95 kg (209 lb)	347 cm (137 in)	325 cm (128 in)	(Germany) Herrsching
5	Matej Kubš	26 May 1988	1.88 m (6 ft 2 in)	82 kg (181 lb)	341 cm (134 in)	315 cm (124 in)	(Slovakia) Bystrina SPU Nitra
6	Filip Palgut	23 September 1991	2.02 m (6 ft 8 in)	90 kg (200 lb)	348 cm (137 in)	330 cm (130 in)	(Czech Republic) České Budějovice
9	Peter Mlynarčík	29 November 1991	2.00 m (6 ft 7 in)	98 kg (216 lb)	350 cm (140 in)	330 cm (130 in)	(Austria) Aich-Dob
10	Marcel Lux	27 July 1994	2.00 m (6 ft 7 in)	92 kg (203 lb)	341 cm (134 in)	315 cm (124 in)	(Slovakia) Mirad Prešov
11	Martin Turis	27 August 1993	1.81 m (5 ft 11 in)	83 kg (183 lb)	325 cm (128 in)	310 cm (120 in)	(Slovakia) Bystrina SPU Nitra
12	Matej Paták	8 June 1990	1.97 m (6 ft 6 in)	88 kg (194 lb)	353 cm (139 in)	330 cm (130 in)	(France) Chaumont 52
13	Štefan Chrtianský	17 August 1989	2.07 m (6 ft 9 in)	97 kg (214 lb)	350 cm (140 in)	335 cm (132 in)	(Austria) Hypo Tirol Innsbruck
14	Ján Tarabus	27 August 1995	2.02 m (6 ft 8 in)	100 kg (220 lb)	350 cm (140 in)	325 cm (128 in)	(Slovakia) Spartak Myjava
15	Juraj Zaťko	5 June 1987	1.92 m (6 ft 4 in)	87 kg (192 lb)	347 cm (137 in)	320 cm (130 in)	(Slovakia) Bystrina SPU Nitra
16	Radoslav Prešinský	14 January 1989	2.06 m (6 ft 9 in)	100 kg (220 lb)	345 cm (136 in)	327 cm (129 in)	(Czech Republic) Aero Odolena Voda
17	František Ogurčák	24 April 1984	1.98 m (6 ft 6 in)	95 kg (209 lb)	348 cm (137 in)	321 cm (126 in)	(Slovakia) Prievidza
18	Daniel Končal	16 September 1982	1.88 m (6 ft 2 in)	84 kg (185 lb)	319 cm (126 in)	300 cm (120 in)	(Czech Republic) Karlovarsko
19	Filip Gavenda	13 January 1996	2.00 m (6 ft 7 in)	88 kg (194 lb)	359 cm (141 in)	330 cm (130 in)	(Germany) Netzhoppers Königs Wusterhausen
22	Marek Mikula	23 February 1988	1.96 m (6 ft 5 in)	88 kg (194 lb)	341 cm (134 in)	323 cm (127 in)	(Czech Republic) Aero Odolena Voda

=== Slovenia ===
The following is the Slovenian roster in the 2017 World League.

Head coach: Slobodan Kovač

No.	Name	Date of birth	Height	Weight	Spike	Block	2016–17 club
1	Tonček Štern	14 November 1995	1.98 m (6 ft 6 in)	95 kg (209 lb)	352 cm (139 in)	340 cm (130 in)	(Italy) Calzedonia Verona
2	Alen Pajenk	23 April 1986	2.03 m (6 ft 8 in)	92 kg (203 lb)	366 cm (144 in)	336 cm (132 in)	(Turkey) Fenerbahçe
3	Žiga Štern	2 January 1994	1.93 m (6 ft 4 in)	88 kg (194 lb)	346 cm (136 in)	330 cm (130 in)	(Slovenia) ACH Ljubljana
4	Jan Kozamernik	24 December 1995	2.04 m (6 ft 8 in)	103 kg (227 lb)	360 cm (140 in)	340 cm (130 in)	(Slovenia) ACH Ljubljana
5	Alen Šket	28 March 1988	2.05 m (6 ft 9 in)	92 kg (203 lb)	350 cm (140 in)	336 cm (132 in)	(Turkey) Fenerbahçe
6	Mitja Gasparini	26 June 1984	2.02 m (6 ft 8 in)	93 kg (205 lb)	346 cm (136 in)	333 cm (131 in)	(South Korea) Incheon Korean Air Jumbos
7	Matej Kök	11 December 1996	1.96 m (6 ft 5 in)	96 kg (212 lb)	355 cm (140 in)	340 cm (130 in)	(Slovenia) Triglav Kranj
9	Dejan Vinčič	15 September 1986	2.00 m (6 ft 7 in)	93 kg (205 lb)	354 cm (139 in)	338 cm (133 in)	(Turkey) Halkbank Ankara
10	Sašo Štalekar	3 May 1996	2.14 m (7 ft 0 in)	98 kg (216 lb)	354 cm (139 in)	340 cm (130 in)	(Slovenia) Calcit Volleyball
11	Danijel Koncilja	4 September 1990	2.01 m (6 ft 7 in)	94 kg (207 lb)	360 cm (140 in)	340 cm (130 in)	(Italy) Kioene Padova
12	Jan Klobučar	11 December 1992	1.96 m (6 ft 5 in)	92 kg (203 lb)	344 cm (135 in)	325 cm (128 in)	(Germany) United Volleys Rhein-Main
13	Jani Kovačič	14 June 1992	1.86 m (6 ft 1 in)	83 kg (183 lb)	320 cm (130 in)	305 cm (120 in)	(Slovenia) ACH Ljubljana
14	Urban Toman	21 October 1997	1.85 m (6 ft 1 in)	82 kg (181 lb)	310 cm (120 in)	295 cm (116 in)	(Slovenia) Triglav Kranj
15	Matic Videčnik	31 July 1993	2.03 m (6 ft 8 in)	98 kg (216 lb)	347 cm (137 in)	329 cm (130 in)	(Slovenia) Calcit Kamnik
16	Gregor Ropret	1 March 1989	1.92 m (6 ft 4 in)	89 kg (196 lb)	343 cm (135 in)	325 cm (128 in)	(Turkey) Afyon Belediye
17	Tine Urnaut (C)	3 September 1988	2.00 m (6 ft 7 in)	88 kg (194 lb)	365 cm (144 in)	332 cm (131 in)	(Italy) Diatec Trentino
18	Klemen Čebulj	21 February 1992	2.02 m (6 ft 8 in)	96 kg (212 lb)	366 cm (144 in)	345 cm (136 in)	(Italy) Cucine Lube Civitanova
21	Matija Jereb	4 October 1991	1.86 m (6 ft 1 in)	79 kg (174 lb)	325 cm (128 in)	299 cm (118 in)	(Slovenia) Salonit Ahnovo

=== South Korea ===
The following is the Korean roster in the 2017 World League.

Head coach: Kim Ho-chul

No.	Name	Date of birth	Height	Weight	Spike	Block	2016–17 club
2	Park Joo-hyeong	5 August 1987	1.94 m (6 ft 4 in)	72 kg (159 lb)	335 cm (132 in)	325 cm (128 in)	(South Korea) Cheonan Hyundai Capital Skywalkers
3	No Jae-wook	10 July 1992	1.91 m (6 ft 3 in)	86 kg (190 lb)	310 cm (120 in)	300 cm (120 in)	(South Korea) Cheonan Hyundai Capital Skywalkers
4	Kim Jeong-hwan	23 March 1988	1.96 m (6 ft 5 in)	94 kg (207 lb)	329 cm (130 in)	320 cm (130 in)	(South Korea) Seoul Woori Card Wibee
5	Bu Yong-chan	30 November 1989	1.75 m (5 ft 9 in)	65 kg (143 lb)	290 cm (110 in)	284 cm (112 in)	(South Korea) Daejeon Samsung Bluefangs
6	Lee Min-gyu	30 November 1989	1.94 m (6 ft 4 in)	78 kg (172 lb)	305 cm (120 in)	295 cm (116 in)	(South Korea) Ansan OK Savings Bank Rush & Cash
7	Lee Kang-won	5 May 1990	1.98 m (6 ft 6 in)	91 kg (201 lb)	330 cm (130 in)	312 cm (123 in)	(South Korea) Gumi KB Insurance Stars
8	Yoo Yoon-sik	2 February 1989	1.98 m (6 ft 6 in)	75 kg (165 lb)	310 cm (120 in)	300 cm (120 in)	(South Korea) Daejeon Samsung Bluefangs
9	Lee Sun-kyu (C)	14 March 1981	1.99 m (6 ft 6 in)	90 kg (200 lb)	325 cm (128 in)	320 cm (130 in)	(South Korea) Gumi KB Insurance Stars
10	Kwak Dong-hyuk	12 March 1983	1.78 m (5 ft 10 in)	69 kg (152 lb)	265 cm (104 in)	260 cm (100 in)	(South Korea) Gumi KB Insurance Stars
11	Choi Hong-suk	26 June 1988	1.95 m (6 ft 5 in)	80 kg (180 lb)	328 cm (129 in)	320 cm (130 in)	(South Korea) Seoul Woori Card Wibee
13	Oh Jae-seong	2 April 1992	1.75 m (5 ft 9 in)	60 kg (130 lb)	285 cm (112 in)	275 cm (108 in)	(South Korea) Suwon KEPCO Vixtorm
14	Song Hui-chae	29 April 1992	1.91 m (6 ft 3 in)	76 kg (168 lb)	305 cm (120 in)	295 cm (116 in)	(South Korea) Ansan OK Savings Bank Rush & Cash
15	Lee Si-woo	7 April 1994	1.88 m (6 ft 2 in)	80 kg (180 lb)	300 cm (120 in)	290 cm (110 in)	(South Korea) Cheonan Hyundai Capital Skywalkers
16	Jin Sang-houn	22 April 1986	2.00 m (6 ft 7 in)	85 kg (187 lb)	336 cm (132 in)	324 cm (128 in)	(South Korea) Incheon Korean Air Jumbos
17	Park Sang-ha	4 April 1986	1.98 m (6 ft 6 in)	89 kg (196 lb)	327 cm (129 in)	315 cm (124 in)	(South Korea) Seoul Woori Card Wibee
18	Shin Yung-suk	10 April 1986	1.98 m (6 ft 6 in)	90 kg (200 lb)	335 cm (132 in)	325 cm (128 in)	(South Korea) Cheonan Hyundai Capital Skywalkers
20	Jung Ji-seok	10 March 1995	1.94 m (6 ft 4 in)	87 kg (192 lb)	310 cm (120 in)	300 cm (120 in)	(South Korea) Incheon Korean Air Jumbos
21	Hwang Taek-eui	12 November 1996	1.90 m (6 ft 3 in)	77 kg (170 lb)	305 cm (120 in)	300 cm (120 in)	(South Korea) Gumi KB Insurance Stars

=== Turkey ===
The following is the Turkish roster in the 2017 World League.

Head coach: Joško Milenkoski

No.	Name	Date of birth	Height	Weight	Spike	Block	2016–17 club
1	Emre Batur	21 April 1988	2.01 m (6 ft 7 in)	95 kg (209 lb)	338 cm (133 in)	325 cm (128 in)	(Turkey) Halkbank Ankara
2	Caner Pekşen	9 June 1987	1.84 m (6 ft 0 in)	79 kg (174 lb)	310 cm (120 in)	200 cm (79 in)	(Turkey) İstanbul BBSK
4	Baturalp Burak Güngör	28 July 1993	1.90 m (6 ft 3 in)	84 kg (185 lb)	351 cm (138 in)	338 cm (133 in)	(Turkey) Ziraat Bankası Ankara
5	Hasan Yeşilbudak	11 January 1984	1.90 m (6 ft 3 in)	83 kg (183 lb)	342 cm (135 in)	329 cm (130 in)	(Turkey) Halkbank Ankara
7	Gökhan Gökgöz	6 January 1993	2.00 m (6 ft 7 in)	95 kg (209 lb)	347 cm (137 in)	334 cm (131 in)	(Turkey) Arkas İzmir
8	Burutay Subaşı	15 July 1990	1.94 m (6 ft 4 in)	99 kg (218 lb)	352 cm (139 in)	339 cm (133 in)	(Turkey) Halkbank Ankara
9	Serhat Coşkun	18 July 1987	1.99 m (6 ft 6 in)	91 kg (201 lb)	336 cm (132 in)	328 cm (129 in)	(Turkey) Afyon Belediye
10	Arslan Ekşi (C)	17 July 1985	1.98 m (6 ft 6 in)	90 kg (200 lb)	335 cm (132 in)	322 cm (127 in)	(Turkey) İstanbul BBSK
11	Mert Matić	22 May 1995	2.10 m (6 ft 11 in)	105 kg (231 lb)	360 cm (140 in)	350 cm (140 in)	(Turkey) İstanbul BBSK
13	Alperay Demirciler	1 February 1993	1.78 m (5 ft 10 in)	72 kg (159 lb)	275 cm (108 in)	263 cm (104 in)	(Turkey) Fenerbahçe
14	Faik Samet Güneş	27 May 1993	2.05 m (6 ft 9 in)	103 kg (227 lb)	342 cm (135 in)	329 cm (130 in)	(Turkey) Halkbank Ankara
15	Metin Toy	3 May 1994	2.01 m (6 ft 7 in)	100 kg (220 lb)	358 cm (141 in)	345 cm (136 in)	(Turkey) Fenerbahçe
16	Murat Yenipazar	1 January 1993	1.94 m (6 ft 4 in)	94 kg (207 lb)	354 cm (139 in)	341 cm (134 in)	(Austria) Hypo Tirol Innsbruck
17	Caner Dengin	15 December 1987	1.87 m (6 ft 2 in)	86 kg (190 lb)	338 cm (133 in)	325 cm (128 in)	(Turkey) Halkbank Ankara
18	İzzet Ünver	1 January 1992	1.95 m (6 ft 5 in)	87 kg (192 lb)	332 cm (131 in)	319 cm (126 in)	(Turkey) Maliye Milli Piyango
19	Yiğit Gülmezoğlu	28 December 1995	1.96 m (6 ft 5 in)	83 kg (183 lb)	361 cm (142 in)	348 cm (137 in)	(Turkey) Arkas İzmir
20	Mustafa Koç	23 February 1992	2.00 m (6 ft 7 in)	92 kg (203 lb)	360 cm (140 in)	349 cm (137 in)	(Turkey) Arkas İzmir
21	Sercan Yüksel Bıdak	6 June 1994	2.02 m (6 ft 8 in)	95 kg (209 lb)	350 cm (140 in)	340 cm (130 in)	(Turkey) Maliye Milli Piyango

== Group 3 ==
=== Austria ===
The following is the Austrian roster in the 2017 World League.

Head coach: Michael Warm

No.	Name	Date of birth	Height	Weight	Spike	Block	2016–17 club
1	Philipp Kroiss	2 March 1988	1.84 m (6 ft 0 in)	82 kg (181 lb)	325 cm (128 in)	310 cm (120 in)	(Belgium) Euphony Asse-Lennik
3	Peter Wohlfahrtstätter (C)	10 March 1989	2.03 m (6 ft 8 in)	92 kg (203 lb)	348 cm (137 in)	331 cm (130 in)	(Poland) Effector Kielce
5	Thomas Tröthann	4 May 1992	2.03 m (6 ft 8 in)	98 kg (216 lb)	345 cm (136 in)	328 cm (129 in)	(Austria) Amstetten NÖ/hotVolleys
6	Anton Menner	25 July 1994	1.94 m (6 ft 4 in)	90 kg (200 lb)	340 cm (130 in)	324 cm (128 in)	(Austria) Aich-Dob
7	Lorenz Koraimann	7 May 1993	2.01 m (6 ft 7 in)	88 kg (194 lb)	345 cm (136 in)	330 cm (130 in)	(Austria) Holding Graz
8	Alexander Tusch	19 November 1992	1.89 m (6 ft 2 in)	81 kg (179 lb)	330 cm (130 in)	314 cm (124 in)	(Austria) Hypo Tirol Innsbruck
9	Thomas Zass	27 November 1989	1.93 m (6 ft 4 in)	90 kg (200 lb)	352 cm (139 in)	335 cm (132 in)	(France) Cannes
10	Fabian Kriener	31 December 1995	1.94 m (6 ft 4 in)	80 kg (180 lb)	340 cm (130 in)	325 cm (128 in)	(Austria) Amstetten NÖ/hotVolleys
12	Alexander Berger	27 September 1988	1.94 m (6 ft 4 in)	85 kg (187 lb)	351 cm (138 in)	334 cm (131 in)	(Italy) Sir Sicoma Colussi Perugia
13	Maximilian Thaller	13 December 1993	1.88 m (6 ft 2 in)	82 kg (181 lb)	325 cm (128 in)	315 cm (124 in)	(Austria) Aich-Dob
14	Florian Ringseis	9 July 1992	1.90 m (6 ft 3 in)	86 kg (190 lb)	325 cm (128 in)	310 cm (120 in)	(Germany) United Volleys Rhein-Main
15	Nicolai Grabmüller	18 April 1996	1.99 m (6 ft 6 in)	99 kg (218 lb)	335 cm (132 in)	320 cm (130 in)	(Germany) Herrsching
16	Clemens Unterberger	22 February 1994	1.94 m (6 ft 4 in)	88 kg (194 lb)	345 cm (136 in)	328 cm (129 in)	(Austria) Holding Graz
17	Mathäus Jurkovics	27 April 1998	2.08 m (6 ft 10 in)	85 kg (187 lb)	340 cm (130 in)	325 cm (128 in)	(Austria) Amstetten NÖ/hotVolleys
18	Paul Buchegger	4 March 1996	2.05 m (6 ft 9 in)	103 kg (227 lb)	345 cm (136 in)	330 cm (130 in)	(Italy) Sieco Service Ortona
19	Fabian Michael Schmiedbauer	22 April 1998	2.07 m (6 ft 9 in)	90 kg (200 lb)	340 cm (130 in)	320 cm (130 in)	(Austria) MusGym Salzburg
20	David Michel	27 October 1996	1.95 m (6 ft 5 in)	85 kg (187 lb)	347 cm (137 in)	330 cm (130 in)	(Poland) Ślepsk Suwałki
21	Alexander Harthaller	17 August 1994	2.00 m (6 ft 7 in)	92 kg (203 lb)	335 cm (132 in)	320 cm (130 in)	(United States) Pepperdine University

=== Chinese Taipei ===
The following is the Taiwanese roster in the 2017 World League.

Head coach: Yu Ching-fang

No.	Name	Date of birth	Height	Weight	Spike	Block	2016–17 club
1	Lin Kuo-chun	11 April 1993	1.89 m (6 ft 2 in)	72 kg (159 lb)	320 cm (130 in)	310 cm (120 in)	
2	Liu Hong-jie	10 November 1993	1.89 m (6 ft 2 in)	80 kg (180 lb)	327 cm (129 in)	320 cm (130 in)	(Chinese Taipei) Taichung Bank Club
3	Li Chia-hsuan	6 September 1993	1.70 m (5 ft 7 in)	66 kg (146 lb)	300 cm (120 in)	270 cm (110 in)	
5	Tung Li-yi	10 October 1994	1.65 m (5 ft 5 in)	62 kg (137 lb)	280 cm (110 in)	270 cm (110 in)	(Chinese Taipei) Taichung Bank Club
6	Tai Ju-chien	4 November 1988	1.81 m (5 ft 11 in)	77 kg (170 lb)	320 cm (130 in)	310 cm (120 in)	(Chinese Taipei) Taichung Bank Club
7	Liu Hung-min	10 November 1993	1.91 m (6 ft 3 in)	85 kg (187 lb)	325 cm (128 in)	315 cm (124 in)	
8	Chang Liang-hao	7 July 1994	1.94 m (6 ft 4 in)	86 kg (190 lb)	320 cm (130 in)	310 cm (120 in)	(Chinese Taipei) Taichung Bank Club
9	Yen Chen-fu	28 October 1997	1.98 m (6 ft 6 in)	82 kg (181 lb)	330 cm (130 in)	320 cm (130 in)	
10	Wu Tsung-hsuan	9 July 1994	1.85 m (6 ft 1 in)	75 kg (165 lb)	325 cm (128 in)	300 cm (120 in)	(Chinese Taipei) Taichung Bank Club
11	Lin Yi-huei	19 February 1997	1.95 m (6 ft 5 in)	80 kg (180 lb)	333 cm (131 in)	320 cm (130 in)	
12	Hsu Mei-chung	16 October 1991	1.88 m (6 ft 2 in)	90 kg (200 lb)	320 cm (130 in)	310 cm (120 in)	(Chinese Taipei) Taichung Bank Club
13	Huang Chien-feng	31 December 1990	1.95 m (6 ft 5 in)	82 kg (181 lb)	345 cm (136 in)	332 cm (131 in)	(Chinese Taipei) Taichung Bank Club
14	Wang Ming-chun	30 July 1988	1.88 m (6 ft 2 in)	85 kg (187 lb)	310 cm (120 in)	300 cm (120 in)	
15	Hsu Wen-chen	30 June 1996	1.88 m (6 ft 2 in)	73 kg (161 lb)	310 cm (120 in)	305 cm (120 in)	
16	Lee Hsing-kuo	20 September 1995	1.91 m (6 ft 3 in)	75 kg (165 lb)	315 cm (124 in)	295 cm (116 in)	
18	Shih Hsiu-chih	24 July 1995	1.84 m (6 ft 0 in)	77 kg (170 lb)	320 cm (130 in)	310 cm (120 in)	
19	Chen Chien-chen (C)	20 November 1989	1.88 m (6 ft 2 in)	87 kg (192 lb)	338 cm (133 in)	325 cm (128 in)	(Chinese Taipei) Taichung Bank Club
20	Chuang Shao-chieh	18 October 1994	1.94 m (6 ft 4 in)	80 kg (180 lb)	330 cm (130 in)	310 cm (120 in)	

=== Estonia ===
The following is the Estonian roster in the 2017 World League.

Head coach: Gheorghe Creţu

No.	Name	Date of birth	Height	Weight	Spike	Block	2016–17 club
1	Henri Treial	28 May 1992	2.02 m (6 ft 8 in)	97 kg (214 lb)	357 cm (141 in)	330 cm (130 in)	(Czech Republic) Karlovarsko
4	Ardo Kreek	7 August 1986	2.03 m (6 ft 8 in)	100 kg (220 lb)	355 cm (140 in)	331 cm (130 in)	(France) Paris Volley
5	Kert Toobal (C)	3 June 1979	1.89 m (6 ft 2 in)	78 kg (172 lb)	345 cm (136 in)	325 cm (128 in)	(France) Rennes 35
6	Oliver Orav	31 August 1995	1.92 m (6 ft 4 in)	76 kg (168 lb)	350 cm (140 in)	325 cm (128 in)	(Estonia) Selver Tallinn
7	Renee Teppan	26 September 1993	1.97 m (6 ft 6 in)	89 kg (196 lb)	352 cm (139 in)	337 cm (133 in)	(Austria) Hypo Tirol Innsbruck
8	Karli Allik	25 September 1996	1.92 m (6 ft 4 in)	82 kg (181 lb)	340 cm (130 in)	322 cm (127 in)	(Estonia) Selver Tallinn
9	Robert Täht	15 August 1993	1.91 m (6 ft 3 in)	84 kg (185 lb)	351 cm (138 in)	334 cm (131 in)	(Poland) Cuprum Lubin
10	Denis Losnikov	25 February 1994	1.96 m (6 ft 5 in)	87 kg (192 lb)	335 cm (132 in)	324 cm (128 in)	(Estonia) Selver Tallinn
11	Oliver Venno	23 May 1990	2.10 m (6 ft 11 in)	106 kg (234 lb)	355 cm (140 in)	331 cm (130 in)	(Turkey) Maliye Milli Piyango
12	Kristo Kollo	17 January 1990	1.90 m (6 ft 3 in)	89 kg (196 lb)	330 cm (130 in)	320 cm (130 in)	(Switzerland) Schönenwerd
13	Andres Toobal	27 August 1988	1.94 m (6 ft 4 in)	80 kg (180 lb)	345 cm (136 in)	325 cm (128 in)	(Belgium) Topvolley Precura Antwerpen
14	Rait Rikberg	30 August 1982	1.74 m (5 ft 9 in)	79 kg (174 lb)	307 cm (121 in)	290 cm (110 in)	(Belgium) Prefaxis Menen
15	Andrus Raadik	19 October 1986	1.99 m (6 ft 6 in)	100 kg (220 lb)	345 cm (136 in)	330 cm (130 in)	(Finland) Pielaveden Sampo
17	Timo Tammemaa	18 November 1991	2.02 m (6 ft 8 in)	93 kg (205 lb)	363 cm (143 in)	343 cm (135 in)	(France) Spacer's Toulouse
18	Rauno Tamme	7 April 1992	1.88 m (6 ft 2 in)	78 kg (172 lb)	344 cm (135 in)	322 cm (127 in)	(Estonia) Selver Tallinn
19	Andri Aganits	7 September 1993	2.07 m (6 ft 9 in)	100 kg (220 lb)	367 cm (144 in)	347 cm (137 in)	(France) Stade Poitevin Poitiers
20	Mart Naaber	15 December 1992	2.12 m (6 ft 11 in)	89 kg (196 lb)	351 cm (138 in)	332 cm (131 in)	(Estonia) Bigbank Tartu
22	Markkus Keel	18 August 1995	1.91 m (6 ft 3 in)	86 kg (190 lb)	327 cm (129 in)	320 cm (130 in)	(Estonia) Pärnu

=== Germany ===
The following is the German roster in the 2017 World League.

Head coach: Andrea Giani

No.	Name	Date of birth	Height	Weight	Spike	Block	2016–17 club
1	Christian Fromm	15 August 1990	2.04 m (6 ft 8 in)	99 kg (218 lb)	345 cm (136 in)	324 cm (128 in)	(Italy) Gi Group Monza
3	Ruben Schott	8 July 1994	1.92 m (6 ft 4 in)	85 kg (187 lb)	326 cm (128 in)	309 cm (122 in)	(Germany) Berlin Recycling Volleys
4	Adam Kocian	1 April 1995	1.92 m (6 ft 4 in)	83 kg (183 lb)	341 cm (134 in)	315 cm (124 in)	(Germany) Lüneburg
5	Moritz Reichert	15 March 1995	1.94 m (6 ft 4 in)	85 kg (187 lb)	336 cm (132 in)	314 cm (124 in)	(Germany) United Volleys Rhein-Main
6	Denys Kaliberda (C)	24 June 1990	1.93 m (6 ft 4 in)	95 kg (209 lb)	343 cm (135 in)	314 cm (124 in)	(Italy) Cucine Lube Civitanova
8	Marcus Böhme	25 August 1985	2.11 m (6 ft 11 in)	116 kg (256 lb)	360 cm (140 in)	330 cm (130 in)	(Poland) Cuprum Lubin
9	Egor Bogachev	6 April 1997	2.03 m (6 ft 8 in)	82 kg (181 lb)	345 cm (136 in)	325 cm (128 in)	(Germany) Berlin Recycling Volleys
10	Linus Weber	1 November 1998	1.99 m (6 ft 6 in)	85 kg (187 lb)	336 cm (132 in)	321 cm (126 in)	(Germany) Berlin Recycling Volleys
12	Leonhard Tille	27 March 1995	1.82 m (6 ft 0 in)	72 kg (159 lb)	325 cm (128 in)	312 cm (123 in)	(Austria) Waldviertel
13	Simon Hirsch	3 April 1992	2.04 m (6 ft 8 in)	96 kg (212 lb)	352 cm (139 in)	344 cm (135 in)	(Italy) Gi Group Monza
14	Moritz Karlitzek	12 August 1996	1.91 m (6 ft 3 in)	91 kg (201 lb)	335 cm (132 in)	310 cm (120 in)	(Germany) Rottenburg
15	Tim Broshog	2 December 1987	2.05 m (6 ft 9 in)	112 kg (247 lb)	340 cm (130 in)	332 cm (131 in)	(Germany) Powervolleys Düren
16	Julian Zenger	26 August 1997	1.90 m (6 ft 3 in)	80 kg (180 lb)	330 cm (130 in)	315 cm (124 in)	(Germany) Friedrichshafen
17	Jan Zimmermann	12 February 1993	1.90 m (6 ft 3 in)	82 kg (181 lb)	340 cm (130 in)	312 cm (123 in)	(Germany) United Volleys Rhein-Main
18	Georg Escher	8 December 1994	2.04 m (6 ft 8 in)	95 kg (209 lb)	335 cm (132 in)	325 cm (128 in)	(Germany) United Volleys Rhein-Main
19	Daniel Malescha	28 April 1994	2.03 m (6 ft 8 in)	90 kg (200 lb)	330 cm (130 in)	315 cm (124 in)	(Germany) Friedrichshafen
20	Anton Brehme	8 October 1999	1.99 m (6 ft 6 in)	86 kg (190 lb)	329 cm (130 in)	322 cm (127 in)	(Germany) Reudnitz
21	Tobias Krick	22 October 1998	2.10 m (6 ft 11 in)	85 kg (187 lb)	350 cm (140 in)	330 cm (130 in)	(Germany) United Volleys Rhein-Main

=== Greece ===
The following is the Greek roster in the 2017 World League.

Head coach: Konstantinos Arseniadis

No.	Name	Date of birth	Height	Weight	Spike	Block	2016–17 club
2	Mitar Tzourits (C)	25 April 1989	2.11 m (6 ft 11 in)	95 kg (209 lb)	360 cm (140 in)	350 cm (140 in)	(Italy) Calzedonia Verona
3	Dimitrios Gkaras	12 November 1985	1.81 m (5 ft 11 in)	74 kg (163 lb)	282 cm (111 in)	280 cm (110 in)	(Greece) P.A.O.K. Thessaloniki
4	Ioannis Takouridis	24 May 1988	1.95 m (6 ft 5 in)	80 kg (180 lb)	300 cm (120 in)	290 cm (110 in)	(Greece) P.A.O.K. Thessaloniki
5	Athanassios Terzis	17 March 1979	1.93 m (6 ft 4 in)	85 kg (187 lb)	335 cm (132 in)	325 cm (128 in)	(Greece) P.A.O.K. Thessaloniki
6	Konstantinos Stivachtis	22 May 1980	1.86 m (6 ft 1 in)	80 kg (180 lb)	305 cm (120 in)	295 cm (116 in)	(Greece) Olympiacos
7	Georgios Petreas	19 November 1986	2.01 m (6 ft 7 in)	92 kg (203 lb)	342 cm (135 in)	320 cm (130 in)	(France) GFCO Ajaccio
9	Menelaos Kokkinakis	21 January 1993	1.93 m (6 ft 4 in)	79 kg (174 lb)	325 cm (128 in)	305 cm (120 in)	(Greece) Olympiacos
10	Andreas Andreadis	14 January 1982	2.05 m (6 ft 9 in)	99 kg (218 lb)	260 cm (100 in)	315 cm (124 in)	(Greece) P.A.O.K. Thessaloniki
11	Stavros Kasampalis	1 June 1995	1.88 m (6 ft 2 in)	85 kg (187 lb)	296 cm (117 in)	266 cm (105 in)	(Greece) Ethnikos Alexandroupolis
12	Nikos Zoupani	18 March 1989	2.02 m (6 ft 8 in)	85 kg (187 lb)	355 cm (140 in)	330 cm (130 in)	(Greece) Olympiacos
13	Rafail Koumentakis	5 May 1993	2.03 m (6 ft 8 in)	84 kg (185 lb)	330 cm (130 in)	310 cm (120 in)	(Poland) Cuprum Lubin
14	Paraskevas Tselios	26 July 1997	2.07 m (6 ft 9 in)	92 kg (203 lb)	345 cm (136 in)	335 cm (132 in)	(Greece) Ethnikos Alexandroupolis
15	Andreas-Dimitrios Frangos	21 December 1989	2.00 m (6 ft 7 in)	93 kg (205 lb)	320 cm (130 in)	315 cm (124 in)	(Greece) Olympiacos
16	Georgios Stefanou	12 January 1981	1.87 m (6 ft 2 in)	82 kg (181 lb)	295 cm (116 in)	305 cm (120 in)	(Greece) Olympiacos
17	Athanasios Protopsaltis	12 September 1993	1.85 m (6 ft 1 in)	73 kg (161 lb)	325 cm (128 in)	316 cm (124 in)	(Germany) Friedrichshafen
18	Anestis Dalakouras	18 June 1993	1.96 m (6 ft 5 in)	82 kg (181 lb)	307 cm (121 in)	328 cm (129 in)	(Austria) Aich-Dob
19	Sotirios Sotiriou	20 April 1986	1.98 m (6 ft 6 in)	100 kg (220 lb)	350 cm (140 in)	338 cm (133 in)	(Greece) P.A.O.K. Thessaloniki
20	Nikolaos Palentzas	6 April 1991	1.98 m (6 ft 6 in)	88 kg (194 lb)	330 cm (130 in)	315 cm (124 in)	(Greece) Ethnikos Alexandroupolis

=== Kazakhstan ===
The following is the Kazakhstani roster in the 2017 World League.

Head coach: Igor Nikolchenko

No.	Name	Date of birth	Height	Weight	Spike	Block	2016–17 club
1	Roman Fartov	2 December 1992	1.84 m (6 ft 0 in)	83 kg (183 lb)	325 cm (128 in)	315 cm (124 in)	(Kazakhstan) Pavlodar
2	Anton Kuznetsov	25 September 1989	2.04 m (6 ft 8 in)	91 kg (201 lb)	346 cm (136 in)	335 cm (132 in)	(Kazakhstan) Altay
3	Dmitriy Vovnenko	17 April 1987	2.12 m (6 ft 11 in)	87 kg (192 lb)	335 cm (132 in)	320 cm (130 in)	(Kazakhstan) Pavlodar
4	Alexandr Stolnikov (C)	17 July 1988	1.97 m (6 ft 6 in)	95 kg (209 lb)	340 cm (130 in)	325 cm (128 in)	(Kazakhstan) TNK Kazchrome
5	Sergey Kuznetsov	26 October 1993	1.97 m (6 ft 6 in)	89 kg (196 lb)	330 cm (130 in)	315 cm (124 in)	(Kazakhstan) Kazygurt
6	Kairat Baibekov	28 March 1983	1.75 m (5 ft 9 in)	71 kg (157 lb)	320 cm (130 in)	315 cm (124 in)	(Kazakhstan) Kazchrome
7	Vassiliy Donets	10 July 1988	1.95 m (6 ft 5 in)	90 kg (200 lb)	340 cm (130 in)	325 cm (128 in)	(Kazakhstan) Altay
8	Kanat Gabdulin	4 March 1985	1.94 m (6 ft 4 in)	85 kg (187 lb)	330 cm (130 in)	325 cm (128 in)	(Kazakhstan) Altay
9	Mikhail Ponomarenko	10 February 1989	1.98 m (6 ft 6 in)	97 kg (214 lb)	340 cm (130 in)	320 cm (130 in)	(Kazakhstan) Kondensat-Zhaikmunay Uralsk
10	Maxim Michshenko	10 September 1990	1.97 m (6 ft 6 in)	94 kg (207 lb)	355 cm (140 in)	315 cm (124 in)	(Kazakhstan) Altay
11	Damir Akimov	22 September 1991	2.02 m (6 ft 8 in)	100 kg (220 lb)	360 cm (140 in)	330 cm (130 in)	(Kazakhstan) Altay
12	Nodirkhan Kadirkhanov	6 September 1991	2.03 m (6 ft 8 in)	85 kg (187 lb)	340 cm (130 in)	330 cm (130 in)	(Kazakhstan) Almaty
13	Vitaliy Erdshtein	5 May 1992	2.05 m (6 ft 9 in)	90 kg (200 lb)	350 cm (140 in)	335 cm (132 in)	(Kazakhstan) Atyrau
14	Nariman Suleimenov	23 June 1982	1.95 m (6 ft 5 in)	92 kg (203 lb)	340 cm (130 in)	330 cm (130 in)	(Kazakhstan) Atyrau
18	Vitaliy Vorivodin	31 July 1990	1.94 m (6 ft 4 in)	101 kg (223 lb)	347 cm (137 in)	335 cm (132 in)	(Kazakhstan) Altay
19	Alpamys Khilimov	26 July 1991	1.80 m (5 ft 11 in)	78 kg (172 lb)	320 cm (130 in)	301 cm (119 in)	(Kazakhstan) Atyrau
20	Nursultan Bimurza	10 March 1994	1.95 m (6 ft 5 in)	75 kg (165 lb)	335 cm (132 in)	320 cm (130 in)	(Kazakhstan) Atyrau
21	Ivan Minakov	12 September 1991	1.87 m (6 ft 2 in)	70 kg (150 lb)	300 cm (120 in)	280 cm (110 in)	(Kazakhstan) Pavlodar

=== Mexico ===
The following is the Mexican roster in the 2017 World League.

Head coach: Jorge Azair

No.	Name	Date of birth	Height	Weight	Spike	Block	2016–17 club
1	Daniel Vargas	1 September 1986	1.97 m (6 ft 6 in)	94 kg (207 lb)	340 cm (130 in)	330 cm (130 in)	(Finland) Raision Loimu
2	Iván Márquez	2 January 1991	1.95 m (6 ft 5 in)	79 kg (174 lb)	312 cm (123 in)	392 cm (154 in)	(Mexico) Tigres UANL
4	Gonzalo Ruiz	28 April 1988	1.86 m (6 ft 1 in)	87 kg (192 lb)	345 cm (136 in)	325 cm (128 in)	(Mexico) IMSS ATN
5	Jesús Rangel (L)	20 September 1980	1.90 m (6 ft 3 in)	82 kg (181 lb)	337 cm (133 in)	330 cm (130 in)	(Mexico) Tigres UANL
6	Jesús Alberto Perales	22 December 1993	1.97 m (6 ft 6 in)	88 kg (194 lb)	328 cm (129 in)	304 cm (120 in)	(Mexico) Tigres UANL
7	Jorge Quiñones	13 November 1981	1.86 m (6 ft 1 in)	80 kg (180 lb)	330 cm (130 in)	325 cm (128 in)	(Mexico) Virtus Guanajuato
9	Carlos Guerra	3 August 1981	1.96 m (6 ft 5 in)	95 kg (209 lb)	348 cm (137 in)	335 cm (132 in)	(Switzerland) Chênois Genève
10	Pedro Rangel (C)	16 September 1988	1.92 m (6 ft 4 in)	85 kg (187 lb)	340 cm (130 in)	324 cm (128 in)	(Mexico) Tigres UANL
11	Jorge Barajas	7 May 1991	1.88 m (6 ft 2 in)	80 kg (180 lb)	320 cm (130 in)	317 cm (125 in)	(Mexico) Cocoteros de Colima
12	José Martínez	23 January 1993	2.00 m (6 ft 7 in)	100 kg (220 lb)	345 cm (136 in)	334 cm (131 in)	(Mexico) Virtus Guanajuato
13	Samuel Córdova	13 March 1989	2.00 m (6 ft 7 in)	89 kg (196 lb)	353 cm (139 in)	335 cm (132 in)	(Mexico) CETYS Baja California
14	Tomás Aguilera	15 November 1988	2.02 m (6 ft 8 in)	95 kg (209 lb)	350 cm (140 in)	340 cm (130 in)	(Mexico) Dorados Chihuahua
16	Miguel Chávez	31 March 1997	2.02 m (6 ft 8 in)	73 kg (161 lb)	335 cm (132 in)	293 cm (115 in)	(Mexico) Universidad de Sonora
17	Néstor Orellana	7 January 1992	1.92 m (6 ft 4 in)	84 kg (185 lb)	332 cm (131 in)	327 cm (129 in)	(Mexico) Tigres UANL
19	José Mendoza Perdomo	31 May 1993	1.70 m (5 ft 7 in)	71 kg (157 lb)	290 cm (110 in)	265 cm (104 in)	(Mexico) University of Guadalajara
20	Julián Duarte	19 June 1994	2.00 m (6 ft 7 in)	98 kg (216 lb)	321 cm (126 in)	302 cm (119 in)	(Mexico) Tigres UANL
23	Alejandro Moreno	6 September 1994	1.91 m (6 ft 3 in)	80 kg (180 lb)	338 cm (133 in)	320 cm (130 in)	(Mexico) Tigres UANL
24	Ridl Garay	9 June 1997	1.94 m (6 ft 4 in)	74 kg (163 lb)	326 cm (128 in)	299 cm (118 in)	(Mexico) University of Guadalajara

=== Montenegro ===
The following is the Montenegrin roster in the 2017 World League.

Head coach: Veljko Basić

No.	Name	Date of birth	Height	Weight	Spike	Block	2016–17 club
1	Aleksandar Minić	9 November 1986	2.05 m (6 ft 9 in)	103 kg (227 lb)	350 cm (140 in)	325 cm (128 in)	(Indonesia) Jakarta Pertamina Energi
2	Simo Dabović	9 April 1987	1.95 m (6 ft 5 in)	93 kg (205 lb)	345 cm (136 in)	335 cm (132 in)	(Iran) Sazman Omran Sari
3	Luka Babić	7 July 1994	2.11 m (6 ft 11 in)	105 kg (231 lb)	340 cm (130 in)	330 cm (130 in)	(Switzerland) Chênois Genève
4	Gojko Ćuk	10 October 1988	2.09 m (6 ft 10 in)	101 kg (223 lb)	347 cm (137 in)	325 cm (128 in)	(France) Nice
5	Rajko Strugar	11 April 1995	1.93 m (6 ft 4 in)	85 kg (187 lb)	335 cm (132 in)	325 cm (128 in)	(France) Tours
6	Vojin Ćaćić (C)	31 March 1990	2.03 m (6 ft 8 in)	101 kg (223 lb)	355 cm (140 in)	340 cm (130 in)	(Lebanon) Bauchrieh Club
7	Nikola Radonić	30 July 1994	1.91 m (6 ft 3 in)	78 kg (172 lb)	0 cm (0 in)	0 cm (0 in)	
8	Nikola Lakčević	14 July 1995	1.90 m (6 ft 3 in)	86 kg (190 lb)	330 cm (130 in)	310 cm (120 in)	(Montenegro) Budvanska Rivijera Budva
9	Marko Bojić	13 November 1988	2.01 m (6 ft 7 in)	88 kg (194 lb)	355 cm (140 in)	335 cm (132 in)	
10	Balša Radunović	12 August 1992	2.05 m (6 ft 9 in)	93 kg (205 lb)	350 cm (140 in)	330 cm (130 in)	(Spain) Teruel
11	Božidar Ćuk	16 June 1992	2.00 m (6 ft 7 in)	97 kg (214 lb)	355 cm (140 in)	330 cm (130 in)	(France) Stade Poitevin Poitiers
12	Slobodan Bojić	11 August 1992	2.00 m (6 ft 7 in)	95 kg (209 lb)	335 cm (132 in)	325 cm (128 in)	(Tunisia) Sfaxien
13	Bojan Strugar	30 June 1995	2.02 m (6 ft 8 in)	93 kg (205 lb)	330 cm (130 in)	325 cm (128 in)	(Italy) Top Volley Latina
14	Blažo Milić	22 November 1987	2.10 m (6 ft 11 in)	88 kg (194 lb)	345 cm (136 in)	335 cm (132 in)	(France) Narbonne
16	Marko Vukašinović	30 July 1993	1.96 m (6 ft 5 in)	88 kg (194 lb)	348 cm (137 in)	330 cm (130 in)	(Switzerland) Näfels
17	Ivan Ječmenica	17 March 1990	2.02 m (6 ft 8 in)	90 kg (200 lb)	350 cm (140 in)	340 cm (130 in)	(France) Cambrai
18	Miloš Ćulafić	13 August 1986	2.05 m (6 ft 9 in)	100 kg (220 lb)	360 cm (140 in)	340 cm (130 in)	(Iran) Sazman Omran Sari
19	Ljubomir Popović	14 November 1988	1.82 m (6 ft 0 in)	87 kg (192 lb)	300 cm (120 in)	295 cm (116 in)	(Montenegro) Jedinstvo Bijelo Polje

=== Qatar ===
The following is the Qatari roster in the 2017 World League.

Head coach: Massimiliano Giaccardi

No.	Name	Date of birth	Height	Weight	Spike	Block	2016–17 club
1	Borislav Georgiev	12 May 1992	1.98 m (6 ft 6 in)	95 kg (209 lb)	340 cm (130 in)	315 cm (124 in)	(Qatar) Police
2	Geraldo Graciano da Silva Filho	3 June 1990	2.02 m (6 ft 8 in)	90 kg (200 lb)	340 cm (130 in)	310 cm (120 in)	(Qatar) Al Rayyan
3	Emir Makas	1 January 1	1.90 m (6 ft 3 in)	85 kg (187 lb)	310 cm (120 in)	290 cm (110 in)	(Qatar) El Jaish
4	Renan Ribeiro (C)	30 December 1989	1.93 m (6 ft 4 in)	85 kg (187 lb)	325 cm (128 in)	300 cm (120 in)	(Qatar) Al Arabi
5	Samb Tamsir	1 March 1993	2.05 m (6 ft 9 in)	75 kg (165 lb)	340 cm (130 in)	330 cm (130 in)	(Qatar) El Jaish
6	John Chigbo	4 April 1989	2.01 m (6 ft 7 in)	95 kg (209 lb)	340 cm (130 in)	325 cm (128 in)	(Qatar) Police
7	Papemaguette Diagne	23 February 1997	2.10 m (6 ft 11 in)	80 kg (180 lb)	360 cm (140 in)	340 cm (130 in)	Qatar
8	Bojan Djukic	6 June 1991	1.93 m (6 ft 4 in)	85 kg (187 lb)	330 cm (130 in)	315 cm (124 in)	(Qatar) El Jaish
9	Milos Stevanovic	27 September 1988	1.92 m (6 ft 4 in)	85 kg (187 lb)	320 cm (130 in)	310 cm (120 in)	(Qatar) El Jaish
10	Marko Stevanovic	25 July 1987	1.85 m (6 ft 1 in)	80 kg (180 lb)	295 cm (116 in)	275 cm (108 in)	(Qatar) El Jaish
11	Nikola Vasić	4 June 1989	1.90 m (6 ft 3 in)	85 kg (187 lb)	340 cm (130 in)	320 cm (130 in)	(Qatar) Al-Wakrah
12	Thiago de Oliveira Guimarães	7 August 1991	2.00 m (6 ft 7 in)	90 kg (200 lb)	340 cm (130 in)	320 cm (130 in)	(Qatar) Al Arabi
13	Ratmt Wadidie	20 October 1995	1.88 m (6 ft 2 in)	80 kg (180 lb)	350 cm (140 in)	340 cm (130 in)	(Qatar) Al Rayyan
14	Adnan Bjelopoljak	21 June 1996	1.90 m (6 ft 3 in)	85 kg (187 lb)	300 cm (120 in)	280 cm (110 in)	(Qatar) El Jaish
15	Ilija Ivoic	11 December 1990	1.90 m (6 ft 3 in)	88 kg (194 lb)	330 cm (130 in)	315 cm (124 in)	(Qatar) Al Ahli
16	Birama Faye	19 April 1995	2.10 m (6 ft 11 in)	95 kg (209 lb)	350 cm (140 in)	335 cm (132 in)	(Qatar) Al Rayyan
17	Belal Abunabot	1 January 1991	2.00 m (6 ft 7 in)	95 kg (209 lb)	355 cm (140 in)	330 cm (130 in)	(Qatar) Al Rayyan
18	Ahmed Noaman	18 April 1994	2.02 m (6 ft 8 in)	85 kg (187 lb)	330 cm (130 in)	310 cm (120 in)	(Qatar) Al-Shamal

=== Spain ===
The following is the Spanish roster in the 2017 World League.

Head coach: Fernando Muñoz

No.	Name	Date of birth	Height	Weight	Spike	Block	2016–17 club
1	Andrés Villena	27 February 1993	1.94 m (6 ft 4 in)	88 kg (194 lb)	356 cm (140 in)	330 cm (130 in)	(Spain) Ca'n Ventura Palma
2	Ángel Trinidad	27 March 1993	1.95 m (6 ft 5 in)	78 kg (172 lb)	342 cm (135 in)	318 cm (125 in)	(Belgium) Knack Randstad Roeselare
3	Sergio Noda	23 March 1987	1.91 m (6 ft 3 in)	87 kg (192 lb)	338 cm (133 in)	325 cm (128 in)	(Italy) Emma Villas Siena
4	Sergi Reñé Giralt	31 August 1997	2.03 m (6 ft 8 in)	85 kg (187 lb)	338 cm (133 in)	330 cm (130 in)	(Spain) Teruel
5	Alejandro Vigil	11 February 1993	2.04 m (6 ft 8 in)	89 kg (196 lb)	348 cm (137 in)	330 cm (130 in)	(Belgium) Noliko Maaseik
6	Borja Ruiz	26 July 1992	2.00 m (6 ft 7 in)	87 kg (192 lb)	340 cm (130 in)	330 cm (130 in)	(Spain) Unicaja Almería
7	Jorge Almansa	17 April 1991	1.95 m (6 ft 5 in)	81 kg (179 lb)	338 cm (133 in)	325 cm (128 in)	(Romania) Steaua București
8	Francisco José Fernández	10 March 1995	1.80 m (5 ft 11 in)	65 kg (143 lb)	310 cm (120 in)	299 cm (118 in)	(Spain) Fundación Cajasol Juvasa
9	Daniel Rocamora	27 May 1988	2.03 m (6 ft 8 in)	104 kg (229 lb)	348 cm (137 in)	332 cm (131 in)	(Switzerland) Schönenwerd
10	Jorge Fernández Valcárcel (C)	4 May 1989	2.01 m (6 ft 7 in)	90 kg (200 lb)	345 cm (136 in)	325 cm (128 in)	(Spain) Ca'n Ventura Palma
11	Miguel Ángel de Amo	16 September 1985	1.85 m (6 ft 1 in)	79 kg (174 lb)	342 cm (135 in)	320 cm (130 in)	(Spain) Unicaja Almería
12	Gerard Osorio	29 March 1993	2.00 m (6 ft 7 in)	89 kg (196 lb)	346 cm (136 in)	331 cm (130 in)	(Spain) Teruel
13	Daniel Ruiz Posadas	28 June 1995	1.90 m (6 ft 3 in)	82 kg (181 lb)	305 cm (120 in)	190 cm (75 in)	(Spain) Vecindario ACEGC
14	Miguel Ángel Fornés	6 September 1993	2.02 m (6 ft 8 in)	94 kg (207 lb)	354 cm (139 in)	339 cm (133 in)	(Belgium) Knack Randstad Roeselare
15	Francisco José Iribarne Fernández	13 July 1998	1.99 m (6 ft 6 in)	91 kg (201 lb)	336 cm (132 in)	328 cm (129 in)	(Spain) Melilla
16	Víctor Rodríguez Pérez	21 September 1998	2.01 m (6 ft 7 in)	85 kg (187 lb)	346 cm (136 in)	340 cm (130 in)	(Spain) Teruel
17	Francisco Ruiz	7 June 1991	1.78 m (5 ft 10 in)	70 kg (150 lb)	334 cm (131 in)	310 cm (120 in)	(Spain) Ca'n Ventura Palma
18	Juan González	11 January 1994	1.92 m (6 ft 4 in)	83 kg (183 lb)	334 cm (131 in)	315 cm (124 in)	(Spain) Unicaja Almería
20	Pablo Bugallo	20 November 1991	1.96 m (6 ft 5 in)	93 kg (205 lb)	344 cm (135 in)	330 cm (130 in)	(Spain) Teruel

=== Tunisia ===
The following is the Tunisian roster in the 2017 World League.

Head coach: Antonio Giacobbe

No.	Name	Date of birth	Height	Weight	Spike	Block	2016–17 club
1	Tayeb Korbosli	5 June 1993	1.88 m (6 ft 2 in)	75 kg (165 lb)	280 cm (110 in)	270 cm (110 in)	(Tunisia) Espérance de Tunis
2	Ahmed Kadhi	19 April 1989	1.99 m (6 ft 6 in)	99 kg (218 lb)	345 cm (136 in)	318 cm (125 in)	(Tunisia) Étoile du Sahel
5	Wassim Ben Tara	3 August 1996	1.99 m (6 ft 6 in)	87 kg (192 lb)	340 cm (130 in)	320 cm (130 in)	(France) Chaumont 52
6	Mohamed Ali Ben Othmen Miladi	12 May 1991	1.88 m (6 ft 2 in)	73 kg (161 lb)	315 cm (124 in)	289 cm (114 in)	(Tunisia) Espérance de Tunis
7	Elyes Karamosli	22 August 1989	1.98 m (6 ft 6 in)	99 kg (218 lb)	345 cm (136 in)	320 cm (130 in)	(Tunisia) Espérance de Tunis
8	Nabil Miladi	28 February 1988	1.96 m (6 ft 5 in)	73 kg (161 lb)	355 cm (140 in)	330 cm (130 in)	(Tunisia) Espérance de Tunis
9	Mahdi Ben Cheikh (C)	13 May 1979	1.84 m (6 ft 0 in)	85 kg (187 lb)	320 cm (130 in)	305 cm (120 in)	(Tunisia) Espérance de Tunis
10	Hamza Nagga	29 May 1990	1.91 m (6 ft 3 in)	84 kg (185 lb)	326 cm (128 in)	311 cm (122 in)	(Tunisia) Étoile du Sahel
11	Ismaïl Moalla	3 January 1990	1.95 m (6 ft 5 in)	84 kg (185 lb)	325 cm (128 in)	308 cm (121 in)	(Turkey) Fenerbahçe
12	Anouer Taouerghi	17 August 1983	1.78 m (5 ft 10 in)	74 kg (163 lb)	302 cm (119 in)	292 cm (115 in)	(Tunisia) Étoile du Sahel
13	Elyes Garfi	8 June 1993	2.02 m (6 ft 8 in)	90 kg (200 lb)	350 cm (140 in)	340 cm (130 in)	(Tunisia) Espérance de Tunis
14	Bilel Ben Hassine	22 June 1983	1.95 m (6 ft 5 in)	88 kg (194 lb)	330 cm (130 in)	315 cm (124 in)	(Tunisia) Espérance de Tunis
15	Hichem Kaabi	13 September 1986	1.94 m (6 ft 4 in)	84 kg (185 lb)	360 cm (140 in)	345 cm (136 in)	(Tunisia) Espérance de Tunis
16	Khaled Ben Slimene	14 December 1994	1.93 m (6 ft 4 in)	78 kg (172 lb)	290 cm (110 in)	285 cm (112 in)	(Tunisia) Espérance de Tunis
17	Chokri Jouini	25 April 1989	1.96 m (6 ft 5 in)	72 kg (159 lb)	355 cm (140 in)	330 cm (130 in)	(Tunisia) Espérance de Tunis
18	Amen Allah Hmissi	6 April 1988	1.80 m (5 ft 11 in)	78 kg (172 lb)	310 cm (120 in)	295 cm (116 in)	(Tunisia) Étoile du Sahel
19	Saddem Hmissi	16 February 1991	1.86 m (6 ft 1 in)	75 kg (165 lb)	312 cm (123 in)	285 cm (112 in)	(Tunisia) Espérance de Tunis
20	Omar Agrebi	26 August 1992	2.05 m (6 ft 9 in)	82 kg (181 lb)	325 cm (128 in)	310 cm (120 in)	(Tunisia) Sfaxien
21	Hakim Zouari	28 March 1988	1.97 m (6 ft 6 in)	97 kg (214 lb)	330 cm (130 in)	320 cm (130 in)	(Tunisia) Sfaxien

=== Venezuela ===
The following is the Venezuelan roster in the 2017 World League.

Head coach: Ronald Sarti

No.	Name	Date of birth	Height	Weight	Spike	Block	2016–17 club
1	Régulo Briceño	13 February 1989	1.75 m (5 ft 9 in)	85 kg (187 lb)	332 cm (131 in)	327 cm (129 in)	(Venezuela) Aragua
2	Jhonlen Barreto	14 May 1987	1.85 m (6 ft 1 in)	80 kg (180 lb)	330 cm (130 in)	325 cm (128 in)	
3	Fernando González	30 June 1989	1.94 m (6 ft 4 in)	84 kg (185 lb)	333 cm (131 in)	328 cm (129 in)	(Argentina) Chubut
4	Héctor Mata	27 January 1991	1.79 m (5 ft 10 in)	77 kg (170 lb)	310 cm (120 in)	304 cm (120 in)	(Venezuela) Deportivo Anzoátegui
5	Emerson Rodríguez	2 February 1993	2.04 m (6 ft 8 in)	96 kg (212 lb)	320 cm (130 in)	318 cm (125 in)	(Venezuela) Distrito Capital
6	Carlos Julio Paez	9 November 1991	1.92 m (6 ft 4 in)	82 kg (181 lb)	342 cm (135 in)	337 cm (133 in)	(Venezuela) Industriales de Valencia
7	Edson Valencia	2 December 1987	1.95 m (6 ft 5 in)	92 kg (203 lb)	330 cm (130 in)	325 cm (128 in)	(Venezuela) Huracanes de Bolívar
8	Héctor Salerno	18 June 1991	1.96 m (6 ft 5 in)	76 kg (168 lb)	358 cm (141 in)	351 cm (138 in)	(Venezuela) Aragua
9	José Carrasco (C)	20 May 1989	1.95 m (6 ft 5 in)	89 kg (196 lb)	345 cm (136 in)	347 cm (137 in)	(Venezuela) Yaracuy
11	José Verdi	6 February 1990	1.96 m (6 ft 5 in)	84 kg (185 lb)	350 cm (140 in)	344 cm (135 in)	(Venezuela) Deportivo Anzoátegui
12	Leonard Colina	24 September 1982	0 m (0 in)	0 kg (0 lb)	0 cm (0 in)	0 cm (0 in)	
13	Iván Fernández	6 February 1994	0 m (0 in)	0 kg (0 lb)	0 cm (0 in)	0 cm (0 in)	
14	Máximo Montoya	26 June 1989	1.98 m (6 ft 6 in)	86 kg (190 lb)	347 cm (137 in)	343 cm (135 in)	(Venezuela) Apure
15	Luis Arias	17 January 1989	1.96 m (6 ft 5 in)	87 kg (192 lb)	339 cm (133 in)	333 cm (131 in)	(Venezuela) Asquimo dos Hermanas
16	Roberth Abreu	5 May 1996	2.00 m (6 ft 7 in)	89 kg (196 lb)	340 cm (130 in)	333 cm (131 in)	(Venezuela) Yaracuy
17	Ronald Fayola	20 June 1995	1.98 m (6 ft 6 in)	88 kg (194 lb)	340 cm (130 in)	335 cm (132 in)	(Venezuela) Huracanes de Bolívar
18	Jonathan Quijada	25 September 1995	2.03 m (6 ft 8 in)	82 kg (181 lb)	346 cm (136 in)	341 cm (134 in)	(Venezuela) Aragua
19	Willner Rivas	2 April 1995	1.94 m (6 ft 4 in)	81 kg (179 lb)	339 cm (133 in)	336 cm (132 in)	(Venezuela) Distrito Capital
20	Juan Manuel Vásquez	27 January 1993	1.96 m (6 ft 5 in)	85 kg (187 lb)	355 cm (140 in)	350 cm (140 in)	(Qatar) Al-Shamal
21	Henry José Rojas	5 November 1992	0 m (0 in)	0 kg (0 lb)	0 cm (0 in)	0 cm (0 in)	
22	Armando Velásquez	18 September 1988	0 m (0 in)	0 kg (0 lb)	0 cm (0 in)	0 cm (0 in)	
