= Elitserien (men's volleyball) =

Swedish men's volleyball top division

- Current season, competition or edition: 2024/2025
- Sport: Volleyball
- Founded: 1962
- First season: 1962
- No. of teams: 11
- Country: Sweden
- Continent: Europe
- Most recent champion: Hylte/Halmstad
- Most titles: Lidingö SK (18 Gold)
- Relegation to: Division 1

Elitserien (Swedish: Elitserien i volleyboll för herrar) is the Swedish men's volleyball top division. By late February-early March it is followed up by the Swedish national championship playoff.

== Teams ==
The following clubs are competing in the 2024–25 season:

- Sollentuna
- Falkoping
- Vingaker
- Orkelljiunga
- Habo
- Hylte/Halmstad
- Lunds
- Sodertegle
- Uppsala
- Malmo VK
- Floby

== Season-by-season League Results ==
The following clubs are competing in the 2024–25 season:

Seasons	Results		
Seasons	Gold	Silver	Bronze
1962	Kolbäck's VK		
1963	Kolbäck's VK		
1964	Kallhälls BK		
1965	Kolbäck's VK		
1966	Lidingö SK		
1967	Lidingö SK		
1967–1968	Lidingö SK		Alingsås VBK
1968–1969	Lidingö SK		
1969–1970	Lidingö SK	Bromma YMCA-YMCA Volleyball	Alingsås VBK
1970–1971	Lidingö SK		
1971–1972	Lidingö SK		
1972–1973	Lidingö SK		
1973–1974	Lidingö SK		
1974–1975	Lidingö SK		
1975–1976	Lidingö SK		
1976–1977	Lidingö SK	Gothenburg's VK Tapper	Sollentuna VK and Eskilstuna VK
1977–1978	Lidingö SK		
1978–1979	Lidingö SK		
1979–1980	Lidingö SK		
1980–1981	Lidingö SK		
1981–1982	Floby VK		
1982–1983	Gothenburg's VK Tapper		
1983–1984	Sollentuna VK		
1984–1985	Sollentuna VK		
1985–1986	Sollentuna VK	Lidingö SK	Floby VK
1986–1987	Lidingö SK		
1987–1988	Sollentuna VK		
1988–1989	Kungälv's VBK	Lidingö SK	Sollentuna VK and Uppsala VBS
1989–1990	Lidingö SK	Kungälv's VBK	Uppsala VBS and Frövi VK
1990–1991	Kungälv's VBK		
1991–1992	Kungälv's VBK		
1992–1993	Kungälv's VBK		
1993–1994	Uppsala VBS		
1994–1995	Shelf VBK		
1995–1996	Shelf VBK		
1996–1997	Floby VK		
1997–1998	ICSU		
1998–1999	Örkelljunga VK		
1999–2000	Shelf VBK		
2000–2001	Shelf VBK		
2001–2002	Örkelljunga VK		
2002–2003	Örkelljunga VK		
2003–2004	Örkelljunga VK		
2004–2005	Tried VBK	Tierps VBK	
2005–2006	Tried VBK	Falkenberg's VBK	
2006–2007	Falkenberg's VBK	Tried VBK	
2007–2008	Falkenberg's VBK	Sollentuna VK	
2008–2009	Falkenbergs VBK	Örkelljunga VK	
2009–2010	Linköping VC	Falkenbergs VBK	
2010–2011	Falkenbergs VBK	Sollentuna VK	
2011–2012	Linköping VC	Falkenbergs VBK	
2012–2013	Hylte/Halmstad VBK	Falkenberg's VBK	
2013–2014	Falkenbergs VBK	Linköping VC	
2014–2015	Linköping VC	Falkenberg's VBK	
2015–2016	Falkenbergs VBK	Linköping VC	Hylte/Halmstad VBK
2016–2017	Linköping VC	Falkenbergs VBK	Örkelljunga VK
2017–2018	Hylte/Halmstad VBK	Linköping VC	Örkelljunga VK
2018–2019	Linköping VC	Hylte/Halmstad VBK	Falkenbergs VBK
2019–2020	Canceled due to the COVID-19 pandemic		
2020–2021	Hylte/Halmstad VBK	Falkenbergs VBK	Sollentuna VK
2021–2022	Hylte/Halmstad VBK	Falkenbergs VBK	Floby VK
2022–2023	Hylte/Halmstad VBK	Habo Wolley	Sollentuna VK
2023–2024	Hylte/Halmstad VBK	Floby VK	Lund's VK
2024–2025	Floby VK	Hylte/Halmstad VBK	Vingaker VK
2025–2026	Hylte/Halmstad VBK	Floby VK	Örkelljunga VK
