= Pajala IF =

Swedish sports club

- Full name: Pajala idrottsförening
- Sport: soccer, floorball basketball, ice hockey, skiing, table tennis, volleyball (earlier)
- Founded: 1930
- Based in: Pajala, Sweden

Pajala IF is a sports club in Pajala, Sweden, established in 1930 playing soccer. It later also adopted basketball, table tennis, soccer, floorball, ice hockey, skiing and volleyball.

The men's volleyball team played in the Swedish top division during the season of 2000–2001.
