= Jacob Ross Guymer =

Australian volleyball player (born 1993)

Personal information
- Nationality: Australian
- Born: 21 June 1993 (age 33)
- Height: 203 cm (6 ft 8 in)
- Weight: 100 kg (220 lb)
- Spike: 350 cm (138 in)
- Block: 339 cm (133 in)

Volleyball information
- Number: 2 (national team)

Career
Years	Teams
2015	Orkelljunga VK

National team
2014-	Australia

Jacob Ross Guymer (born 21 June 1993) is an Australian male volleyball player. He plays for the Australia men's national volleyball team. At club level he plays for Orkelljunga VK.
