= Auke van de Kamp =

Dutch volleyball player (born 1995)

Personal information
- Nationality: Dutch
- Born: 31 July 1995 (age 31); Zutphen
- Height: 2.00 m (6 ft 7 in)
- Weight: 88 kg (194 lb)
- Spike: 345 cm (136 in)
- Block: 336 cm (132 in)

Volleyball information
- Position: Outside spiker
- Current club: Lüneburg
- Number: 5

National team
Netherlands

Auke van de Kamp (born 31 July 1995) is a Dutch volleyball player for Lüneburg and the Dutch national team.

He participated at the 2017 Men's European Volleyball Championship.
