= Vingåkers VK =

Volleyball club in Vingåker, Sweden

- Full name: Vingåkers volleybollklubb
- Short name: VVK
- Founded: 1972
- Ground: Vidåkershallen, Vingåker, Sweden

Vingåkers VK is a volleyball club in Vingåker, Sweden, established in 1972. In 2003 the club played the Swedish men's national championship finals against Örkelljunga VK.
