= Matyáš Démar =

Czech volleyball player (born 1991)

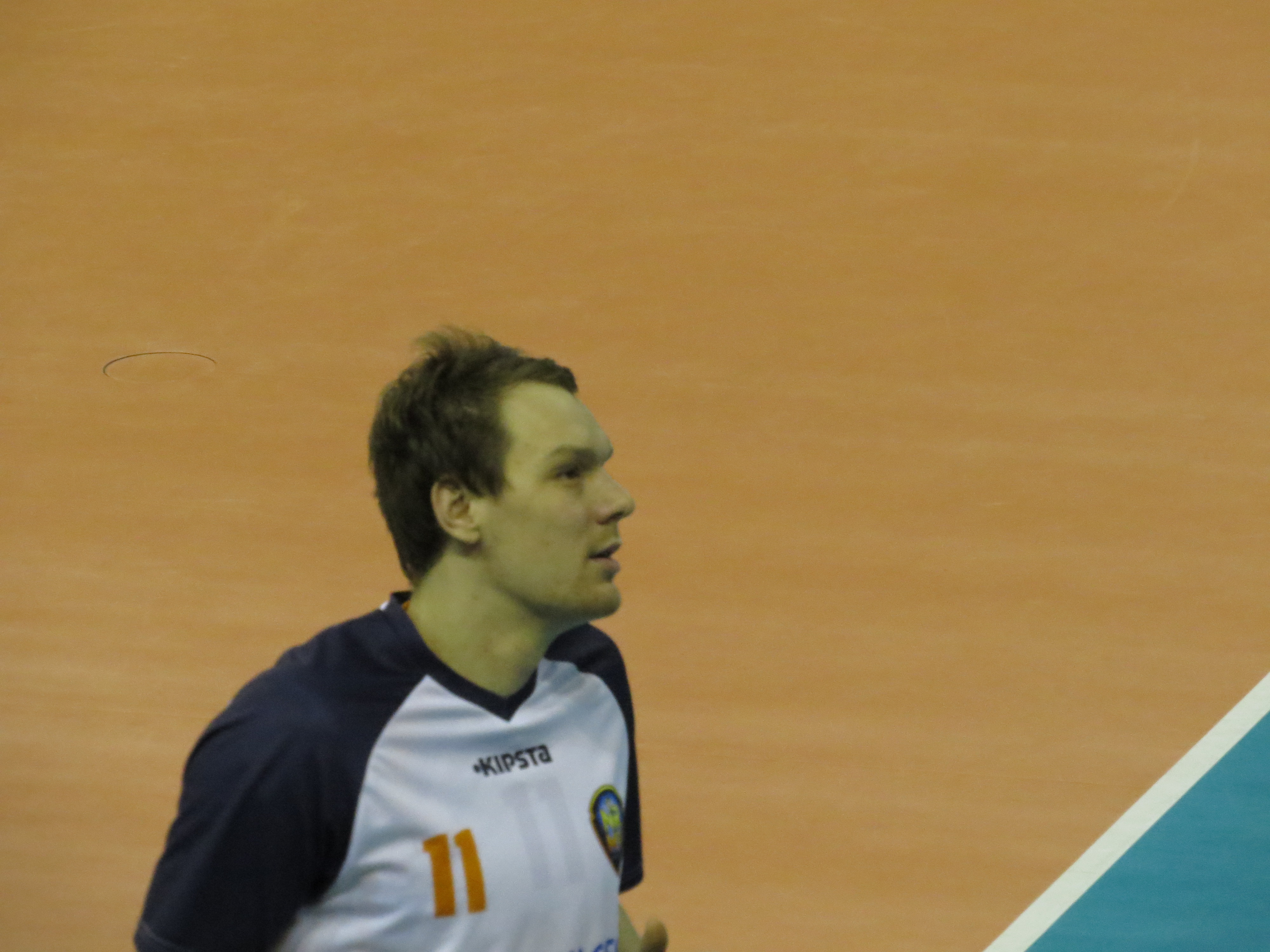

Personal information
- Nationality: Czech
- Born: 1 October 1991 (age 35)
- Height: 2.04 m (6 ft 8 in)
- Weight: 100 kg (220 lb)
- Spike: 340 cm (134 in)
- Block: 328 cm (129 in)

Volleyball information
- Position: Setter
- Current club: Nantes Rezé Métropole Volley

National team
Czech Republic

Matyáš Démar (born 1 October 1991) is a Czech volleyball player for Nantes Rezé Métropole Volley and the Czech national team.

He participated at the 2017 Men's European Volleyball Championship.
