= Armando Velásquez =

Venezuelan volleyball player (born 1988)

Personal information
- Full name: Armando Fernándo Velásquez Escalante
- Born: 18 September 1988 (age 37) Altagracia de Orituco, Venezuela
- Height: 1.85 m (6 ft 1 in)

Sport
- Country: Venezuela
- Sport: Volleyball

Armando Fernándo Velásquez Escalante (Note: In this Spanish name, the first or paternal surname is Velásquez and the second or maternal family name is Escalante.) (born 18 September 1988) is a Venezuelan volleyball player. He competed in the 2020 Summer Olympics.
