= Adam Kocian =

German volleyball player (born 1995)

Personal information
- Nationality: German
- Born: 1 April 1995 (age 31); Andernach
- Height: 6 ft 4 in (1.92 m)
- Weight: 198 lb (90 kg)
- Spike: 130 in (340 cm)
- Block: 125 in (317 cm)

Volleyball information
- Position: Setter
- Current club: (Germany) United Volleys Frankfurt
- Number: 18

Career
Years	Teams
2013-2015; 2015-2018; 2018-	(Germany) VSG Coburg/Grub (Germany) SVG Lüneburg (Germany) United Volleys Frankfurt

Adam Kocian (born 1 April 1995 in Andernach) is a German volleyball player, a member of the club United Volleys Frankfurt.
