= Floby VK =

Volleyball club in Floby, Sweden

- Full name: Floby volleybollklubb
- Short name: FVK
- Founded: 12 February 1962
- Ground: Floby sporthall, Floby, Sweden

Floby VK is a volleyball club in Floby, Sweden, established on 12 February 1962. The club won the Swedish men's national championship in 1982 and 1997.
