= Örkelljunga VK =

Swedish volleyball club

- Full name: Örkelljunga volleybollklubb
- Short name: ÖVK
- Founded: August 1982
- Ground: Örkelljunga idrottshall, Örkelljunga, Sweden

Örkelljunga VK is a volleyball club in Örkelljunga, Sweden, established in August 1982. The club won the Swedish men's national championship in 1999 2002, 2003 and 2004.
