= 2025–26 Galatasaray S.K. (men's volleyball) season =

Turkish volleyball club season

Galatasaray HDI Sigorta
2025–26 season
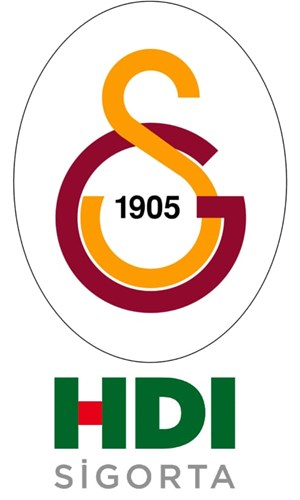
- President: Dursun Özbek
- Head coach: Umut Çakır (until 12 December 2025); Andrea Gardini (from 15 December 2025)
- Arena: TVF Burhan Felek Sport Hall
- Turkish Men's Volleyball League: 3rd seed
- Playoffs: 2nd
- CEV Champions League: League round
- CEV Cup: Quarterfinals
- Turkish Men's Volleyball Cup: Runners-up

It is the 2025–26 season of the Men's Volleyball team of Galatasaray Sports Club.

== Season overview ==
=== Pre-season ===
On 20 August, SMS Group Efeler League 2025–26 Volleyball Season Fixtures Have Been Drawn.

== Sponsorship and kit manufacturers ==
- Supplier: Puma
- Name sponsor: HDI Sigorta
- Main sponsor: HDI Sigorta
- Back sponsor: 1905 GSYİAD
- Sleeve sponsor: A11 Hotels
- Lateral sponsor: Novo Şirketler Grubu
- Short sponsor: —
- Socks sponsor: —

== Technical staff ==
As of 15 December 2025

Name	Job
(Turkey) Neslihan Turan	Administrative Manager
(Turkey) Mustafa Yurdaer Kobal	Assistant Administrative Manager
(Turkey) Mehmetcan Şamlı	Team Manager
(Italy) Andrea Gardini	Head Coach
(Poland) Mateusz Jakub Nykiel	Assistant Coach
(Turkey) Cihan Çintay	Assistant Coach
(Turkey) Furkan Kasap	Assistant Coach
(Turkey) Mertcan Kır	Statistics Coach
(Turkey) Yalçın Ayhan	Physiotherapist
(Turkey) Emre Yanık	Physiotherapist
(Turkey) Turgay Aslanyürek	Conditioner
(Turkey) Ali Tufan	Outfitter
(Turkey) Defne Heybeli	Media Officer

=== Staff changes ===
Change	Date	Staff member	Staff position	Ref.
Out	9 July 2025	(Turkey) Aykut Yılmaz	Masseur	
In	23 July 2025	(Poland) Mateusz Jakub Nykiel	Assistant Coach	
In	25 July 2025	(Turkey) Cihan Çintay	Assistant Coach	
In	18 August 2025	(Turkey) Emre Yanık	Physiotherapist	
Out	12 December 2025	(Turkey) Umut Çakır	Head Coach	
In	15 December 2025	(Italy) Andrea Gardini	Head Coach	

== Team roster ==
As of 7 April 2026

No.	Player	Position	Date of Birth	Height (m)	Country
1	Thomas Jaeschke	Outside Hitter	4 September 1993 (age 33)	2.00	United States
3	Michael Wright	Setter	18 June 2001 (age 25)	1.93	United States
4	Hacı Şahin	Middle-blocker	1 January 2000 (age 26)	2.05	Turkey
5	Hasan Yeşilbudak	Libero	11 January 1984 (age 42)	1.90	Turkey
6	Gökçen Yüksel	Outside Hitter	11 July 2004 (age 22)	2.04	Turkey
7	Ahmet Tümer	Middle-blocker	15 September 2001 (age 25)	2.03	Turkey
8	Onur Günaydı	Outside Hitter	28 September 2002 (age 24)	2.03	Turkey
9	Jean Patry	Opposite	27 December 1996 (age 29)	2.07	France
10	Arslan Ekşi (c)	Setter	17 July 1985 (age 41)	1.96	Turkey
12	Georgi Tatarov	Outside Hitter	10 May 2003 (age 23)	2.00	Bulgaria
13	Stephen Maar	Outside Hitter	6 December 1994 (age 31)	1.99	Canada
14	Faik Samet Güneş	Middle-blocker	27 May 1993 (age 33)	2.03	Turkey
15	Caner Ergül	Libero	31 July 1994 (age 32)	1.87	Turkey
17	Doğukan Ulu	Middle-blocker	30 October 1995 (age 30)	2.05	Turkey
21	Roamy Alonso	Middle-blocker	24 July 1997 (age 29)	2.03	Cuba
77	Can Koç	Opposite	29 April 2003 (age 23)	2.00	Turkey

== Transfers ==
=== New contracts ===
Date	Player	Contract length	Source
2 June 2025	(Turkey) Ahmet Tümer	1-year	
7 July 2025	(France) Jean Patry	2-year	
10 July 2025	(Turkey) Onur Günaydı	1-year	

=== Transfers in ===
Date	Player	Transferred from	Fee	Source
27 May 2025	(Turkey) Faik Samet Güneş	(Turkey) Ziraat Bankası	Free	
12 June 2025	(Turkey) Can Koç	(Turkey) Arkas Spor	Free	
4 July 2025	(Turkey) Gökçen Yüksel	(Turkey) Arkas Spor	Free	
8 July 2025	(United States) Thomas Jaeschke	(Japan) Osaka Bluteon	Free	
9 July 2025	(Cuba) Roamy Alonso	(Italy) Gioiella Prisma Taranto	Free	
25 July 2025	(Canada) Stephen Maar	(Italy) Gas Sales Bluenergy Piacenza	Free	
23 August 2025	(United States) Michael Wright	(Germany) SVG Lüneburg	Free	
24 February 2026	(Bulgaria) Georgi Tatarov	(Italy) Yuasa Battery Grottazzolina	Undisclosed	

=== Transfers out ===
Date	Player	Transferred to	Fee	Source
12 May 2025	(Turkey) Selim Kalaycı	(Turkey) Gebze Belediyesi	End of contract	
12 May 2025	(Turkey) Muzaffer Yönet		End of contract	
12 May 2025	(Turkey) Oğuzhan Karasu	(Turkey) Akkuş Belediyespor	End of contract	
12 May 2025	(Italy) (Czech Republic) Jiří Kovář	(Greece) AO Flisvos	End of contract	
12 May 2025	(Italy) (Russia) Ivan Zaytsev	(Italy) Cuneo Volley	End of contract	
9 July 2025	(Turkey) Aykut Acar	(Turkey) Gebze Belediyesi Spor Kulübü	End of contract	
21 July 2025	(Bulgaria) Martin Atanasov	(Italy) Vero Volley Monza	End of contract	
21 August 2025	(Brazil) Victor Cardoso	(United Arab Emirates) Al Jazira Sport Club	Mutual agreement	

=== Loans in ===
Date	Player	From	Fee	Source
29 January 2026	(Turkey) Hacı Şahin	(Turkey) Ziraat Bankası	Undisclosed	

== Pre-season and friendlies ==
Date	Time		Score		Set 1	Set 2	Set 3	Set 4	Set 5	Total	Report
24 September 2025	–	Galatasaray HDI Sigorta	3–1	İBB Spor Kulübü	25–16	25–23	22–25	25–22	–	97–86	Report
27 September 2025	–	Galatasaray HDI Sigorta	3–1	Gebze Belediyesi Spor Klubü	25–20	25–27	25–22	17–15	–	92–84	Report
2 October 2025	13:00	Galatasaray HDI Sigorta	3–0	İstanbul Gençlik Spor Kulübü	25–22	25–16	25–19	–	–	75–57	Report
3 October 2025	13:30	Galatasaray HDI Sigorta	3–2	Dinamo București	18–25	25–19	25–20	14–25	15–10	97–99	Report
4 October 2025	19:30	Galatasaray HDI Sigorta	3–1	İBB Spor Kulübü	–	–	–	–	–	0–0	Report 1 Report 2
11 October 2025	18:30	Energa Trefl Gdańsk	1–3	Galatasaray HDI Sigorta	–	–	–	–	–	0–0	Report
12 October 2025	16:30	ACH Volley	3–0	Galatasaray HDI Sigorta	–	–	–	–	–	0–0	Report

== Competitions ==
=== Turkish Men's Volleyball League ===
==== Regular season (1st Half) ====
- All times are Europe Time (UTC+03:00).

Date	Time		Score		Set 1	Set 2	Set 3	Set 4	Set 5	Total	Report
25 October 2025	15:00	Galatasaray HDI Sigorta	3–1	Altekma SK	17–25	25–19	25–21	28–26	–	95–91	Report 1 Report 2
28 October 2025	17:30	Halkbank	3–0	Galatasaray HDI Sigorta	25–23	25–20	27–25	–	–	77–68	Report 1 Report 2
16 November 2025	13:30	Galatasaray HDI Sigorta	3–2	Gaziantep Gençlik Spor Kulübü	22–25	25–20	25–19	23–25	15–12	110–101	Report 1 Report 2
19 November 2025	16:30	İBB Spor Kulübü	1–3	Galatasaray HDI Sigorta	20–25	25–20	22–25	20–25	–	87–95	Report 1 Report 2
22 November 2025	19:00	Galatasaray HDI Sigorta	3–0	Kuşgöz İzmir Vinç Akkuş Belediyespor	25–23	25–19	25–16	–	–	75–58	Report 1 Report 2
26 November 2025	18:00	Fenerbahçe Medicana	2–3	Galatasaray HDI Sigorta	25–22	22–25	21–25	25–17	16–18	109–107	Report 1 Report 2
29 November 2025	13:00	Galatasaray HDI Sigorta	3–2	Gebze Belediyesi Spor Klubü	25–23	22–25	25–19	23–25	15–6	110–98	Report 1 Report 2
2 December 2025	13:00	Ziraat Bankası	3–2	Galatasaray HDI Sigorta	25–21	23–25	25–22	18–25	15–11	106–104	Report 1 Report 2
6 December 2025	14:00	Galatasaray HDI Sigorta	1–3	Spor Toto Spor Kulübü	25–19	24–26	22–25	16–25	–	87–95	Report 1 Report 2
13 December 2025	13:00	Rams Global Cizre Belediyesi Spor Kulübü	0–3	Galatasaray HDI Sigorta	–	–	–	–	–	0–0	Report 1 Report 2
16 December 2025	18:00	Galatasaray HDI Sigorta	3–2	İstanbul Gençlik Spor Kulübü	23–25	25–22	20–25	25–21	15–9	108–102	Report 1 Report 2
20 December 2025	14:30	On Hotels Alanya Belediyespor	1–3	Galatasaray HDI Sigorta	25–23	22–25	16–25	21–25	–	84–98	Report 1 Report 2
27 December 2025	17:00	Bursa Büyükşehir Belediyespor Kulübü	0–3	Galatasaray HDI Sigorta	20–25	23–25	18–25	–	–	61–75	Report 1 Report 2

==== Regular season (2nd Half) ====
- All times are Europe Time (UTC+03:00).

Date	Time		Score		Set 1	Set 2	Set 3	Set 4	Set 5	Total	Report
11 January 2026	15:00	Altekma SK	1–3	Galatasaray HDI Sigorta	25–22	18–25	23–25	21–25	–	87–97	Report 1 Report 2
18 January 2026	16:30	Galatasaray HDI Sigorta	3–0	Halkbank	25–23	25–20	25–18	–	–	75–61	Report 1 Report 2
25 January 2026	16:00	Gaziantep Gençlik Spor Kulübü	0–3	Galatasaray HDI Sigorta	21–25	16–25	18–25	–	–	55–75	Report 1 Report 2
1 February 2026	14:00	Galatasaray HDI Sigorta	3–2	İBB Spor Kulübü	22–25	25–21	34–36	25–21	15–10	121–113	Report 1 Report 2
7 February 2026	14:00	Kuşgöz İzmir Vinç Akkuş Belediyespor	2–3	Galatasaray HDI Sigorta	19–25	28–26	25–23	17–25	9–15	98–114	Report 1 Report 2
15 February 2026	16:30	Galatasaray HDI Sigorta	0–3	Fenerbahçe Medicana	21–25	19–25	19–25	–	–	59–75	Report 1 Report 2
22 February 2026	14:00	Gebze Belediyesi Spor Klubü	0–3	Galatasaray HDI Sigorta	20–25	23–25	29–31	–	–	72–81	Report 1 Report 2
26 February 2026	20:00	Galatasaray HDI Sigorta	0–3	Ziraat Bankası	17–25	21–25	22–25	–	–	60–75	Report 1 Report 2
1 March 2026	13:00	Spor Toto Spor Kulübü	3–0	Galatasaray HDI Sigorta	25–17	25–19	29–27	–	–	79–63	Report 1 Report 2
March 2026	–	Galatasaray HDI Sigorta	–	Rams Global Cizre Belediyesi Spor Kulübü	–	–	–	–	–	0–0	
15 March 2026	14:00	İstanbul Gençlik Spor Kulübü	2–3	Galatasaray HDI Sigorta	30–28	18–25	28–30	25–23	19–21	120–127	Report 1 Report 2
18 March 2026	16:00	Galatasaray HDI Sigorta	3–1	On Hotels Alanya Belediyespor	25–18	25–17	23–25	25–23	–	98–83	Report 1 Report 2
22 March 2026	14:00	Galatasaray HDI Sigorta	3–0	Bursa Büyükşehir Belediyespor Kulübü	25–21	25–22	25–21	–	–	75–64	Report 1 Report 2

==== Playoffs ====
===== 1–4th place =====
- All times are Europe Time (UTC+03:00).

Date	Time		Score		Set 1	Set 2	Set 3	Set 4	Set 5	Total	Report
12 April 2026	19:00	Halkbank	0–3	Galatasaray HDI Sigorta	24–26	22–25	27–29	–	–	73–80	Report 1 Report 2
15 April 2026	19:00	Galatasaray HDI Sigorta	3–0	Halkbank	25–17	25–18	25–22	–	–	75–57	Report 1 Report 2

===== 1–2th place =====
- All times are Europe Time (UTC+03:00).

Date	Time		Score		Set 1	Set 2	Set 3	Set 4	Set 5	Total	Report
21 April 2026	19:00	Ziraat Bankası	3–1	Galatasaray HDI Sigorta	25–23	20–25	25–21	25–19	–	95–88	Report 1 Report 2
24 April 2026	19:00	Galatasaray HDI Sigorta	2–3	Ziraat Bankası	25–23	25–17	19–25	11–25	9–15	89–105	Report 1 Report 2
27 April 2026	19:00	Ziraat Bankası	3–0	Galatasaray HDI Sigorta	25–22	25–13	25–19	–	–	75–54	Report 1 Report 2

=== Turkish Men's Volleyball Cup ===
==== Quarterfinals ====
- All times are Europe Time (UTC+03:00).

Date	Time		Score		Set 1	Set 2	Set 3	Set 4	Set 5	Total	Report
4 February 2026	13:00	Galatasaray HDI Sigorta	3–2	İBB Spor Kulübü	23–25	25–22	25–19	22–25	15–13	110–104	Report 1 Report 2

==== Semifinals ====
- All times are Europe Time (UTC+03:00).

Date	Time		Score		Set 1	Set 2	Set 3	Set 4	Set 5	Total	Report
6 April 2026	19:00	Galatasaray HDI Sigorta	3–1	Fenerbahçe Medicana	25–23	25–19	21–25	27–25	–	98–92	Report 1 Report 2

==== Final ====
- All times are Europe Time (UTC+03:00).

Date	Time		Score		Set 1	Set 2	Set 3	Set 4	Set 5	Total	Report
7 April 2026	19:00	Ziraat Bankası	3–0	Galatasaray HDI Sigorta	25–21	25–12	25–19	–	–	75–52	Report 1 Report 2

=== CEV Champions League ===
==== League round ====
===== Pool B =====
Pos	Team	Pld	W	L	Pts	SW	SL	SR	SPW	SPL	SPR	Qualification
1	(Poland) Bogdanka LUK Lublin	6	6	0	15	18	7	2.571	579	498	1.163	Quarterfinals
2	(Belgium) Knack Roeselare	6	3	3	10	15	14	1.071	628	607	1.035	Playoffs
3	(Turkey) Galatasaray HDI	6	2	4	7	11	15	0.733	567	596	0.951	2025–26 CEV Cup
4	(Turkey) Halkbank Ankara	6	1	5	4	9	17	0.529	538	611	0.881	

Source: CEV

Date	Time		Score		Set 1	Set 2	Set 3	Set 4	Set 5	Total	Report
10 December 2025	20:00	Galatasaray HDI Sigorta (Turkey)	3–2	(Belgium) Knack Roeselare	25–18	19–25	21–25	25–23	15–13	105–104	P2; Report 1 Report 2
7 January 2026	20:00	Halkbank Ankara (Turkey)	3–2	(Turkey) Galatasaray HDI Sigorta	25–18	25–19	18–25	35–37	18–16	121–115	P2; Report 1 Report 2
22 January 2026	20:00	Galatasaray HDI Sigorta (Turkey)	1–3	(Poland) Bogdanka LUK Lublin	26–24	17–25	19–25	18–25	–	80–99	P2; Report 1 Report 2
29 January 2026	20:00	Galatasaray HDI Sigorta (Turkey)	3–1	(Turkey) Halkbank Ankara	25–16	27–25	22–25	25–20	–	99–86	P2; Report 1 Report 2
10 February 2026	22:30	Knack Roeselare (Belgium)	3–2	(Turkey) Galatasaray HDI Sigorta	25–22	21–25	26–24	23–25	25–10	120–106	P2; Report 1 Report 2
18 February 2026	22:30	Bogdanka LUK Lublin (Poland)	3–0	(Turkey) Galatasaray HDI Sigorta	25–17	25–21	26–24	–	–	76–62	P2; Report 1 Report 2

=== CEV Cup ===
==== Quarterfinals ====
- All times are Europe Time (UTC+03:00).

Date	Time		Score		Set 1	Set 2	Set 3	Set 4	Set 5	Total	Report
5 March 2026	20:00	Galatasaray HDI Sigorta (Turkey)	2–3	(Belgium) Greenyard Maaseik	23–25	26–24	23–25	25–23	11–15	108–112	Report 1 Report 2
11 March 2026	22:30	Greenyard Maaseik (Belgium)	3–1	(Turkey) Galatasaray HDI Sigorta	21–25	25–14	25–12	37–35	–	108–86	Report 1 Report 2

== See also ==
- Commons:Category:2025–26 Galatasaray S.K. (men's volleyball) season
