= 2024–25 Galatasaray S.K. (men's volleyball) season =

Turkish volleyball team season

Galatasaray HDI Sigorta
2024–25 season
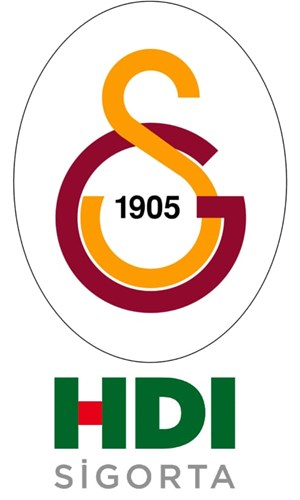
- President: Dursun Özbek
- Head coach: Umut Çakır
- Arena: TVF Burhan Felek Sport Hall
- Turkish Men's Volleyball League: 2nd seed
- Playoffs: 2nd
- Turkish Men's Volleyball Cup: Quarter-finals
- CEV Cup: 8th finals

It is the 2024–25 season of the Men's Volleyball team of Galatasaray Sports Club.

== Season overview ==
=== Pre-season ===
On 1 August, The 2024–25 Volleyball Season fixtures in the Efeler Ligi have been announced.

== Sponsorship and kit manufacturers ==
- Supplier: Puma
- Name sponsor: HDI Sigorta
- Main sponsor: HDI Sigorta
- Back sponsor: 1905 GSYİAD
- Sleeve sponsor: A11 Hotels
- Lateral sponsor: —
- Short sponsor: A11 Hotels
- Socks sponsor: —

== Technical staff ==
As of 15 August 2024

Name	Job
(Turkey) Neslihan Turan	Administrative Manager
(Turkey) Mehmetcan Şamlı	Team Manager
(Turkey) Umut Çakır	Head Coach
(Turkey) Hüseyin Gültekin	Assistant Coach
(Turkey) Furkan Kasap	Assistant Coach
(Turkey) Mertcan Kır	Statistics Coach
(Turkey) Yalçın Ayhan	Physiotherapist
(Turkey) Turgay Aslanyürek	Conditioner
(Turkey) Aykut Yılmaz	Masseur

== Team roster ==
As of 11 January 2025

No.	Player	Position	Date of birth	Height (m)	Country
1	Martin Atanasov	Outside Hitter	27 September 1996 (age 29)	1.99	Bulgaria
2	Jiří Kovář	Outside Hitter	10 April 1989 (age 37)	2.02	Italy / Czech Republic
5	Hasan Yeşilbudak	Libero	11 January 1984 (age 42)	1.90	Turkey
7	Ahmet Tümer	Middle Blocker	15 September 2001 (age 24)	2.03	Turkey
8	Aykut Acar	Middle-blocker	14 February 2000 (age 26)	1.92	Turkey
9	Jean Patry	Opposite	27 December 1996 (age 29)	2.07	France
10	Arslan Ekşi (c)	Setter	17 July 1985 (age 40)	1.96	Turkey
11	Muzaffer Yönet	Setter	18 June 1997 (age 28)	1.97	Turkey
12	Victor Cardoso	Outside Hitter	22 March 1999 (age 27)	2.00	Brazil
13	Oğuzhan Karasu	Middle-blocker	16 June 1995 (age 30)	2.05	Turkey
14	Selim Kalaycı	Opposite	12 February 2000 (age 26)	2.02	Turkey
15	Caner Ergül	Libero	31 July 1994 (age 31)	1.87	Turkey
17	Doğukan Ulu	Middle-blocker	30 October 1995 (age 30)	2.05	Turkey
18	Ivan Zaytsev	Outside Hitter	2 October 1988 (age 37)	2.04	Italy / Russia
19	Ahmet Ege Totik	Setter	1 January 2004 (age 22)	1.82	Turkey

== Transfers ==
=== Contract extensions ===
Date	Player	Contract length	Source
1 July 2024	(Turkey) Aykut Acar	1-year	
2 July 2024	(Turkey) Onur Günaydı	1-year	
3 July 2024	(Turkey) Selim Kalaycı	1-year	
5 July 2024	(Turkey) Oğuzhan Karasu	1-year	

=== Transfers in ===
Date	Player	Transferred from	Fee	Source
8 July 2024	(Turkey) Doğukan Ulu	(Turkey) Halkbank	Free	
9 July 2024	(Turkey) Hasan Yeşilbudak	(Turkey) Fenerbahçe	Free	
10 July 2024	(Turkey) Caner Ergül	(Turkey) Bursa Büyükşehir Belediyespor	Free	
12 July 2024	(Italy) Jiří Kovář	(Greece) Panathinaikos	Free	
13 July 2024	(Bulgaria) Martin Atanasov	(Russia) Lokomotiv Novosibirsk	Free	
14 July 2024	(France) Jean Patry	(Poland) Jastrzębski Węgiel	Free	
7 August 2024	(Brazil) Victor Cardoso	(France) Chaumont Volley-Ball 52	Free	
8 August 2024	(Turkey) Arslan Ekşi	(Turkey) Ziraat Bankası	Free	
27 December 2024	(Italy) Ivan Zaytsev	(Italy) Vero Volley Monza	Undisclosed	

=== Transfers out ===
Date	Player	Transferred to	Fee	Source
28 May 2024	(Czech Republic) Jan Hadrava	(Poland) Indykpol AZS Olsztyn	End of contract	
28 May 2024	(Germany) Jan Zimmermann	(Italy) Gioiella Prisma Taranto	End of contract	
29 May 2024	(Serbia) Miran Kujundžić	(Poland) PGE GiEK Skra Bełchatów	End of contract	
29 May 2024	(Serbia) Nikola Mijailović	(Greece) AO Flisvos	End of contract	
30 May 2024	(Turkey) Beytullah Hatipoğlu	(Turkey) Spor Toto Spor Kulübü	End of contract	
27 June 2024	(Turkey) Baturalp Burak Güngör	(Turkey) Fenerbahçe Medicana	End of contract	
18 July 2024	(Turkey) Osman Çağatay Durmaz	(Turkey) Fenerbahçe Medicana	Mutual agreement	

=== Loans out ===
Date	Player	Transferred to	Fee	Until	Source
23 September 2024	(Turkey) Ozan Ataseven	(Turkey) Kuşgöz İzmir Vinç Akkuş Belediyespor	Undisclosed	End of season	
6 January 2025	(Turkey) Onur Günaydı	(Turkey) ON Hotels Alanya Belediyespor	Undisclosed	End of season	

== Pre-season and friendlies ==
Date	Time		Score		Set 1	Set 2	Set 3	Set 4	Set 5	Total	Report
17 September 2024	–	Galatasaray HDI Sigorta	2–1	İstanbul Büyükşehir Belediyespor	25–22	25–20	19–25	–	–	69–67	Report
20 September 2024	13:00	Halkbank	0–3	Galatasaray HDI Sigorta	20–25	23–25	30–32	–	–	73–82	Report
21 September 2024	13:00	Ziraat Bankası	3–0	Galatasaray HDI Sigorta	25–15	25–23	25–20	–	–	75–58	Report
26 September 2024	–	Galatasaray HDI Sigorta	2–2	İstanbul Gençlik Spor Kulübü	26–24	25–20	22–25	24–26	–	97–95	Report
28 September 2024	13:00	Galatasaray HDI Sigorta	3–1	İstanbul Gençlik Spor Kulübü	26–24	21–25	25–23	15–12	–	87–84	Report

== Competitions ==
=== Turkish Men's Volleyball League ===
==== Regular season (1st Half) ====
- All times are Europe Time (UTC+03:00).

Date	Time		Score		Set 1	Set 2	Set 3	Set 4	Set 5	Total	Report
6 October 2024	17:00	Galatasaray HDI Sigorta	3–2	ON Hotels Alanya Belediyespor	20–25	25–20	25–17	25–27	15–13	110–102	Report 1 Report 2
13 October 2024	13:00	Türşad	0–3	Galatasaray HDI Sigorta	8–25	21–25	22–25	–	–	51–75	Report 1 Report 2
20 October 2024	14:00	Galatasaray HDI Sigorta	3–1	Kuşgöz İzmir Vinç Akkuş Belediyespor	25–20	25–17	25–27	25–21	–	100–85	Report 1 Report 2
25 October 2024	14:00	İstanbul Gençlik Spor Kulübü	1–3	Galatasaray HDI Sigorta	21–25	25–18	15–25	15–25	–	76–93	Report 1 Report 2
30 October 2024	17:30	Galatasaray HDI Sigorta	3–2	Halkbank	18–25	25–16	17–25	25–12	18–16	103–94	Report 1 Report 2
3 November 2024	19:30	Fenerbahçe Medicana	3–2	Galatasaray HDI Sigorta	25–16	25–18	21–25	22–25	15–11	108–95	Report 1 Report 2
10 November 2024	14:00	Galatasaray HDI Sigorta	1–3	Arkas Spor	24–26	25–21	23–25	20–25	–	92–97	Report 1 Report 2
17 November 2024	16:00	Bursa Büyükşehir Belediyespor	0–3	Galatasaray HDI Sigorta	19–25	21–25	18–25	–	–	58–75	Report 1 Report 2
24 November 2024	15:00	Galatasaray HDI Sigorta	3–1	Cizre Belediye	25–19	22–25	25–23	25–20	–	97–87	Report 1 Report 2
1 December 2024	14:00	Galatasaray HDI Sigorta	0–3	Ziraat Bankası	18–25	23–25	19–25	–	–	60–75	Report 1 Report 2
8 December 2024	17:00	Spor Toto Spor Kulübü	0–3	Galatasaray HDI Sigorta	21–25	20–25	15–25	–	–	56–75	Report 1 Report 2
15 December 2024	15:00	Altekma SK	2–3	Galatasaray HDI Sigorta	25–17	25–21	20–25	23–25	10–15	103–103	Report 1 Report 2

==== Regular season (2nd Half) ====
- All times are Europe Time (UTC+03:00).

Date	Time		Score		Set 1	Set 2	Set 3	Set 4	Set 5	Total	Report
4 January 2025	13:00	ON Hotels Alanya Belediyespor	2–3	Galatasaray HDI Sigorta	25–22	20–25	16–25	26–24	13–15	100–111	Report 1 Report 2
7 January 2025	19:00	Galatasaray HDI Sigorta	3–0	Türşad	25–12	25–16	25–22	–	–	75–50	Report 1 Report 2
11 January 2025	13:00	Kuşgöz İzmir Vinç Akkuş Belediyespor	0–3	Galatasaray HDI Sigorta	20–25	23–25	21–25	–	–	64–75	Report 1 Report 2
18 January 2025	19:30	Galatasaray HDI Sigorta	3–1	İstanbul Gençlik Spor Kulübü	25–21	25–27	25–23	25–22	–	100–93	Report 1 Report 2
25 January 2025	19:00	Halkbank	3–0	Galatasaray HDI Sigorta	25–21	25–22	25–21	–	–	75–64	Report 1 Report 2
1 February 2025	20:00	Galatasaray HDI Sigorta	2–3	Fenerbahçe Medicana	22–25	25–21	25–23	25–27	16–18	113–114	Report 1 Report 2
4 February 2025	19:00	Arkas Spor	3–1	Galatasaray HDI Sigorta	25–23	25–27	25–16	25–19	–	100–85	Report 1 Report 2
8 February 2025	19:30	Galatasaray HDI Sigorta	3–0	Bursa Büyükşehir Belediyespor	25–20	25–23	25–22	–	–	75–65	Report 1 Report 2
15 February 2025	13:00	Cizre Belediye	1–3	Galatasaray HDI Sigorta	21–25	14–25	25–22	11–25	–	71–97	Report 1 Report 2
1 March 2025	19:30	Ziraat Bankası	3–0	Galatasaray HDI Sigorta	25–18	25–22	25–19	–	–	75–59	Report 1 Report 2
8 March 2025	17:30	Galatasaray HDI Sigorta	3–0	Spor Toto Spor Kulübü	25–23	25–23	25–18	–	–	75–64	Report 1 Report 2
15 March 2025	16:00	Galatasaray HDI Sigorta	3–0	Altekma SK	25–17	25–18	25–17	–	–	75–52	Report 1 Report 2

==== Playoffs ====
===== 1–4th place =====
- All times are Europe Time (UTC+03:00).

Date	Time		Score		Set 1	Set 2	Set 3	Set 4	Set 5	Total	Report
13 April 2025	13:00	Galatasaray HDI Sigorta	3–0	Fenerbahçe Medicana	25–23	25–14	25–23	–	–	75–60	Report 1 Report 2
16 April 2025	20:30	Fenerbahçe Medicana	1–3	Galatasaray HDI Sigorta	20–25	31–29	19–25	22–25	–	92–104	Report 1 Report 2

===== 1–2nd place =====
- All times are Europe Time (UTC+03:00).

Date	Time		Score		Set 1	Set 2	Set 3	Set 4	Set 5	Total	Report
23 April 2025	17:00	Ziraat Bankası	3–0	Galatasaray HDI Sigorta	25–19	25–21	26–24	–	–	76–64	Report 1 Report 2
26 April 2025	18:00	Galatasaray HDI Sigorta	1–3	Ziraat Bankası	23–25	15–25	25–23	25–27	–	88–100	Report 1 Report 2
29 April 2025	19:00	Ziraat Bankası	3–0	Galatasaray HDI Sigorta	25–18	25–22	25–21	–	–	75–61	Report 1 Report 2

=== Turkish Men's Volleyball Cup ===
==== Quarter-finals ====
- All times are Europe Time (UTC+03:00).

Date	Time		Score		Set 1	Set 2	Set 3	Set 4	Set 5	Total	Report
19 February 2025	14:00	Galatasaray HDI Sigorta	1–3	İstanbul Gençlik Spor Kulübü	25–22	23–25	20–25	19–25	–	87–97	Report 1 Report 2

=== CEV Cup ===
==== 16th finals ====
- All times are Europe Time (UTC+03:00).

Date	Time		Score		Set 1	Set 2	Set 3	Set 4	Set 5	Total	Report
12 November 2024	21:00	Fino Kaposvár (Hungary)	2–3	(Turkey) Galatasaray HDI Sigorta	25–21	25–22	14–25	18–25	8–15	90–108	Report 1 Report 2
21 November 2024	20:00	Galatasaray HDI Sigorta (Turkey)	3–0	(Hungary) Fino Kaposvár	25–19	25–14	25–17	–	–	75–50	Report 1 Report 2

==== 8th finals ====
- All times are Europe Time (UTC+03:00).

Date	Time		Score		Set 1	Set 2	Set 3	Set 4	Set 5	Total	Report
4 December 2024	20:00	Galatasaray HDI Sigorta (Turkey)	1–3	(Turkey) Ziraat Bankası	25–22	16–25	21–25	13–25	–	75–97	Report 1 Report 2
19 December 2024	19:00	Ziraat Bankası (Turkey)	3–0	(Turkey) Galatasaray HDI Sigorta	25–21	25–19	25–18	–	–	75–58	Report 1 Report 2
