= Çalışkan =

Çalışkan is a Turkish word meaning hard working. It may refer to:

== People ==
- Hamza Çalışkan (born 1994), Turkish Paralympian para table tennis player
- Neslihan Çalışkan (born 1997), Turkishfemale handball player
- Nizamettin Çalışkan (born 1987), Turkish footballer
- Oğuz Çalışkan (born 1988), Turkish footballer
- Rıfat Çalışkan (born 1940), Turkish Olympian cyclist
- Sema Çalışkan, female boxer
- Semih Çalışkan (born 1986), Turkish writer
- Sıla Çalışkan (born 1996), Turkish volleyball player
- Tuncay Çalışkan (born 1977), Turkish-born Austrian taekwondo practitioner

== Places ==
- Çalışkan, Gercüş, a village in Gercüş district of Batman Province, Turkey
- Çalışkan, Karayazı, neighbourhood in Karayazı district of Erzurum Province, Turkey
