= 1986–87 Galatasaray S.K. (men's volleyball) season =

Galatasaray YK
1986–87 season
- Chairman: (Turkey) Ali Tanrıyar
- Manager: (Turkey) Enver Göçener
- Turkish Volleyball League: 1st

Galatasaray SK. Men's 1986–87 season is the 1986–1987 volleyball season for Turkish professional basketball club Galatasaray Yurtiçi Kargo.

The club competes in:

- Turkish Men's Volleyball League
- CEV Champions Cup

== Team roster season 1986–87 ==
Shirt No	Nationality	Player
1	Turkey	Ahmet Gülüm
2	Turkey	İbrahim
3	Turkey	Hakan
4	Turkey	İsmet
7	Turkey	Paidar Demir
8	Turkey	Metin
9	Turkey	Barbaros
10	Turkey	Tunçhan
11	Turkey	Mehmet
12	Turkey	M. Faik
13	Turkey	Seçil
14	Turkey	Semih
15	Yugoslavia	Lukac

== Results, schedules and standings ==
Results

Pos	Team	Total					
		Pts	Pld	W	L	F	A
1	Galatasaray SK	50	26	24	2	73	20
2	Eczacıbaşı SK	49	26	23	3	70	13
3	Sönmez Filament SK	48	26	22	4	71	19
4	G.S. Altınyurt SK	45	26	19	7	64	35
5	Ziraat Bankası SK	44	26	18	8	58	32
6	S. Irmak Sanayi SK	39	26	13	13	51	50
7	Silahlı Kuvvetler SK	37	26	11	15	48	59
8	Fenerbahçe	36	26	10	16	41	61
9	Karşıyaka	36	26	10	16	38	61
10	Emlak Kredi SK	35	26	10	16	42	59
11	Otomarsan SK	35	26	9	17	35	61
12	Petrolofisi SK	33	26	7	19	38	62
13	Arçelik SK	32	26	6	19	36	64
14	Kandıra SK	25	26	0	26	3	78

Pts=Points, Pld=Matches played, W=Matches won, L=Matches lost, F=Points for, A=Points against

=== Turkish Volleyball League 1986–87 ===
==== Regular season ====
===== First half =====
October 4, 1986; 19:15	Silahlı Kuvvetler SK	2–3	Galatasaray Yurtiçi Kargo	Ankara
October 4, 1986; 19:15	(13–15, 15–4, 15–10, 13–15, 11–15) [ (Report)]			Ankara

October 5, 1986; 19:15	Petrolofisi SK	1–3	Galatasaray Yurtiçi Kargo	Ankara
October 5, 1986; 19:15	(15–13, 14–16, 13–15, 2–15) [ (Report)]			Ankara

October 12, 1986; 19:00	Galatasaray Yurtiçi Kargo	3–0	Fenerbahçe	Spor Sergi Sarayı, Istanbul
October 12, 1986; 19:00	(15–6, 15–4, 15–7) [ (Report)]			Spor Sergi Sarayı, Istanbul

October 18, 1986; 19:15	Karşıyaka	0–3	Galatasaray Yurtiçi Kargo	İzmir
October 18, 1986; 19:15	(3–15, 8–15, 6–15) [ (Report)]			İzmir

October 25, 1986; 19:15	Galatasaray Yurtiçi Kargo	3–1	Arçelik SK	Spor Sergi Sarayı, Istanbul
October 25, 1986; 19:15	(13–15, 16–14, 15–6, 15–2) [ (Report)]			Spor Sergi Sarayı, Istanbul

November 22, 1986	Eczacıbaşı SK	1–3	Galatasaray Yurtiçi Kargo	Istanbul
November 22, 1986	(3–15, 10–15, 15–7, 11–15) [ (Report)]			Istanbul

November 29, 1986; 19:00	Galatasaray Yurtiçi Kargo	3–0	Otomarsan SK	Spor Sergi Sarayı, Istanbul
November 29, 1986; 19:00	(15–12, 15–11, 15–1) [ (Report)]			Spor Sergi Sarayı, Istanbul

November 30, 1986; 19:00	Galatasaray Yurtiçi Kargo	1–3	G.S. Altınyurt SK	Spor Sergi Sarayı, Istanbul
November 30, 1986; 19:00	(13–15, 15–7, 10–15, 15–17) [ (Report)]			Spor Sergi Sarayı, Istanbul

December 20, 1986; 19:15	Galatasaray Yurtiçi Kargo	3–1	Sönmez Filament SK	Spor Sergi Sarayı, Istanbul
December 20, 1986; 19:15	(15–13, 15–13, 13–15, 15–7) [ (Report)]			Spor Sergi Sarayı, Istanbul

December 21, 1986; 19:00	Galatasaray Yurtiçi Kargo	3–0	Kandıra SK	Spor Sergi Sarayı, Istanbul
December 21, 1986; 19:00	(15–3, 15–9, 15–5) [ (Report)]			Spor Sergi Sarayı, Istanbul

December 27, 1986; 19:00	Galatasaray Yurtiçi Kargo	3–0	Ziraat Bankası SK	Spor Sergi Sarayı, Istanbul
December 27, 1986; 19:00	(15–12, 15–10, 15–12) [ (Report)]			Spor Sergi Sarayı, Istanbul

December 28, 1986; 19:00	Galatasaray Yurtiçi Kargo	3–0	Emlak Kredi SK	Spor Sergi Sarayı, Istanbul
December 28, 1986; 19:00	(15–6, 15–10, 15–5) [ (Report)]			Spor Sergi Sarayı, Istanbul

January 3, 1987; 19:15	S. Irmak Sanayi	0–3	Galatasaray Yurtiçi Kargo	Samsun
January 3, 1987; 19:15	(9–15, 14–16, 10–15) [ (Report)]			Samsun

===== Second half =====
January 10, 1987; 19:00	Galatasaray Yurtiçi Kargo	3–0	Fenerbahçe	Spor Sergi Sarayı, Istanbul
January 10, 1987; 19:00	(15–6, 15–9, 15–7) [ (Report)]			Spor Sergi Sarayı, Istanbul

January 11, 1987; 19:15	Galatasaray Yurtiçi Kargo	3–1	Arçelik SK	Spor Sergi Sarayı, Istanbul
January 11, 1987; 19:15	(15–10, 13–15, 15–4, 15–7) [ (Report)]			Spor Sergi Sarayı, Istanbul

January 24, 1987; 19:15	Galatasaray Yurtiçi Kargo	3–1	S. Irmak Sanayi SK	Spor Sergi Sarayı, Istanbul
January 24, 1987; 19:15	(15–5, 12–15, 15–9, 15–8) [ (Report)]			Spor Sergi Sarayı, Istanbul

January 25, 1987; 19:15	Galatasaray Yurtiçi Kargo	3–1	Karşıyaka	Spor Sergi Sarayı, Istanbul
January 25, 1987; 19:15	(16–14, 4–15, 15–2, 15–7) [ (Report)]			Spor Sergi Sarayı, Istanbul

January 31, 1987; 19:15	Ziraat Bankası SK	3–0	Galatasaray Yurtiçi Kargo	Ankara
January 31, 1987; 19:15	(15–13, 16–14, 15–13) [ (Report)]			Ankara

February 1, 1987; 19:15	Emlak Kredi SK	2–3	Galatasaray Yurtiçi Kargo	Ankara
February 1, 1987; 19:15	(17–15, 5–15, 15–12, 3–15, 7–15) [ (Report)]			Ankara

February 14, 1987; 19:15	Sönmez Filament SK	1–3	Galatasaray Yurtiçi Kargo	Bursa
February 14, 1987; 19:15	(5–15, 13–15, 15–12, 6–15) [ (Report)]			Bursa

February 7, 1987; 19:00	Galatasaray Yurtiçi Kargo	3–0	Eczacıbaşı SK	Spor Sergi Sarayı, Istanbul
February 7, 1987; 19:00	(15–13, 15–9, 15–12) [ (Report)]			Spor Sergi Sarayı, Istanbul

February 21, 1987; 19:00	Galatasaray Yurtiçi Kargo	3–0	Otomarsan SK	Spor Sergi Sarayı, Istanbul
February 21, 1987; 19:00	(15–10, 15–10, 15–3) [ (Report)]			Spor Sergi Sarayı, Istanbul

February 22, 1987; 19:15	Galatasaray Yurtiçi Kargo	3–1	G.S. Altınyurt SK	Spor Sergi Sarayı, Istanbul
February 22, 1987; 19:15	(15–11, 15–6, 16–18, 15–7) [ (Report)]			Spor Sergi Sarayı, Istanbul

March 1, 1987; 19:00	Galatasaray Yurtiçi Kargo	3–0	Kandıra SK	Spor Sergi Sarayı, Istanbul
March 1, 1987; 19:00	(15–7, 15–4, 15–6) [ (Report)]			Spor Sergi Sarayı, Istanbul

March 11, 1987; 19:00	Galatasaray Yurtiçi Kargo	3–0	Silahlı Kuvvetler SK	Spor Sergi Sarayı, Istanbul
March 11, 1987; 19:00	(15–8, 15–6, 15–3) [ (Report)]			Spor Sergi Sarayı, Istanbul

March 12, 1987; 19:15	Galatasaray Yurtiçi Kargo	3–1	Petrolofisi SK	Spor Sergi Sarayı, Istanbul
March 12, 1987; 19:15	(12–15, 15–6, 15–5, 15–6) [ (Report)]			Spor Sergi Sarayı, Istanbul

=== CEV Champions Cup 1986–87 ===
==== First Tour ====
November 8, 1987; 19:15	Kecskeméti TE	0–3	Galatasaray Yurtiçi Kargo	Hungary
November 8, 1987; 19:15	(13–15, 14–16, 9–15) [ (Report)]			Hungary

November 15, 1987; 19:00	Galatasaray Yurtiçi Kargo	3–0	Kecskeméti TE	Spor Sergi Sarayı, Istanbul
November 15, 1987; 19:00	(19–17, 15–11, 16–14) [ (Report)]			Spor Sergi Sarayı, Istanbul

==== Second Tour ====
December 6, 1987; 19:00	Galatasaray Yurtiçi Kargo	0–3	HCC/net Martinus Amstelveen	Spor Sergi Sarayı, Istanbul
December 6, 1987; 19:00	(11–15, 5–15, 4–15) [ (Report)]			Spor Sergi Sarayı, Istanbul

December 12, 1987; 19:15	HCC/net Martinus Amstelveen	3–0	Galatasaray Yurtiçi Kargo	Netherlands
December 12, 1987; 19:15	[ (Report)]			Netherlands
