= 1931–32 Galatasaray S.K. (men's volleyball) season =

Galatasaray YK
1931-32 season
- Chairman: (Turkey) Tahir Kevkep
- Istanbul Men's Volleyball League: winner

Galatasaray SK. Men's 1931–1932 season is the 1931–1932 volleyball season for Turkish professional basketball club Galatasaray Yurtiçi Kargo.

The club competes in:

- Istanbul Men's Volleyball League

== Team Roster Season 1931-1932 ==
Shirt No	Nationality	Player
1	Turkey	Sezai
2	Turkey	Samim
3	Turkey	
4	Turkey	
5	Turkey	
6	Turkey	

== Results, schedules and standings ==
=== Istanbul Volleyball League 1931–32 ===
Results

Pos.	Club	W	L
1	(Turkey) Galatasaray	7	0
2	(Turkey) Beşiktaş JK	6	1
3	(Turkey) Fenerbahçe	5	2

==== Regular season ====
January 29, 1932	Fenerbahçe	0–2	Galatasaray	Galatasaray Salonu, Istanbul
January 29, 1932	(8–15, 6–15) [ (Report)]			Galatasaray Salonu, Istanbul

February 5, 1932	Galatasaray	2–0	Eyüp SK	Galatasaray Salonu, Istanbul
February 5, 1932	(15–3, 15–5) [ (Report)]			Galatasaray Salonu, Istanbul

February 19, 1932	Vefa SK	0–2	Galatasaray	Galatasaray Salonu, Istanbul
February 19, 1932	(6–15, 6–15) [ (Report)]			Galatasaray Salonu, Istanbul

February 26, 1932	Galatasaray	2–1	İstanbulspor	Galatasaray Salonu, Istanbul
February 26, 1932	(15–5, 13–15, 15–2) [ (Report)]			Galatasaray Salonu, Istanbul

March 4, 1932	Beşiktaş JK	0–2	Galatasaray	Galatasaray Salonu, Istanbul
March 4, 1932	(7–15, 10–15) [ (Report)]			Galatasaray Salonu, Istanbul

February 26, 1932	Galatasaray	2–1	Süleymaniye	Galatasaray Salonu, Istanbul
February 26, 1932	(15–3, 15–5) [ (Report)]			Galatasaray Salonu, Istanbul

April 15, 1932	Kasımpaşa	0–2	Galatasaray	Galatasaray Salonu, Istanbul
April 15, 1932	(?–15, ?–15) [ (Report)]			Galatasaray Salonu, Istanbul
