= 1987–88 Galatasaray S.K. (men's volleyball) season =

Galatasaray YK
1987–88 season
- Chairman: (Turkey) Ali Tanrıyar
- Manager: (Turkey) Enver Göçener
- Turkish Volleyball League: 1st
- Milli Eğitim ve Gençlik Spor Bakanlığı Cup: 2nd

Galatasaray SK. Men's 1987–88 season is the 1987–1988 volleyball season for Turkish professional basketball club Galatasaray Yurtiçi Kargo.

The club competes in:

- Turkish Men's Volleyball League
- CEV Champions Cup

== Team roster season 1987–88 ==
Shirt No	Nationality	Player
1	Turkey	Ahmet Gülüm
2	Turkey	İbrahim
3	Turkey	Hakan
4	Turkey	İsmet
7	Turkey	Paidar Demir
8	Turkey	Metin
9	Iran	Habib Kozehli
10	Turkey	Barbaros
11	Turkey	Necdet
12	Turkey	Mehmet
13	Turkey	Cem
14	Turkey	Burak
15	Turkey	Hüseyin

== Results, schedules and standings ==
Results

Pos	Team	Total					
		Pts	Pld	W	L	F	A
1	Galatasaray SK	35	20	15	5	51	24
2	Sönmez Filament SK	35	20	15	5	50	30
3	Emlak Kredi SK	34	20	14	6	49	28
4	Eczacıbaşı SK	34	20	14	6	50	33
5	Karşıyaka	33	20	13	7	47	29
6	Arçelik SK	30	20	10	10	42	26
7	G.S. Altınyurt SK	30	20	10	10	39	41
8	Petrolofisi	27	20	7	13	27	47
9	Ziraat Bankası SK	26	20	6	14	30	46
10	Fenerbahçe	25	20	5	15	30	50
11	Silahlı Kuvvetler SK	21	20	1	19	8	59

Pts=Points, Pld=Matches played, W=Matches won, L=Matches lost, F=Points for, A=Points against

=== Turkish Volleyball League 1987–88 ===
==== Regular season ====
===== First half =====
October 24, 1987; 12:30	Emlak Kredi SK	2–3	Galatasaray Yurtiçi Kargo	Selim Sırrı Tarcan Spor Salonu, Ankara; Referees: İsmail Hakkı Esemen, Akif Paçacı
October 24, 1987; 12:30	(3–15, 15–12, 15–12, 6–15, 12–15) [ (Report)]			Selim Sırrı Tarcan Spor Salonu, Ankara; Referees: İsmail Hakkı Esemen, Akif Paçacı

October 25, 1987; 13:30	Galatasaray Yurtiçi Kargo	2–3	Eczacıbaşı SK	Burhan Felek Spor Salonu, Istanbul; Referees: Haluk Tuncay, Kadir İlbeyli
October 25, 1987; 13:30	(15–6, 15–10, 9–15, 5–15, 12–15) [ (Report)]			Burhan Felek Spor Salonu, Istanbul; Referees: Haluk Tuncay, Kadir İlbeyli

October 31, 1987; 15:00	Galatasaray Yurtiçi Kargo	0–3	Sönmez Filament SK	Burhan Felek Spor Salonu, Istanbul; Referees: Tuncer Orhon, Orhan Utkan
October 31, 1987; 15:00	(9–15, 11–15, 6–15) [ (Report)]			Burhan Felek Spor Salonu, Istanbul; Referees: Tuncer Orhon, Orhan Utkan

November 28, 1987; 12:30	Karşıyaka	1–3	Galatasaray Yurtiçi Kargo	Selim Sırrı Tarcan Spor Salonu, İzmir; Referees: Tuncer Orhon, Kazım Eker
November 28, 1987; 12:30	(15–9, 13–15, 13–15, 11–15) [ (Report)]			Selim Sırrı Tarcan Spor Salonu, İzmir; Referees: Tuncer Orhon, Kazım Eker

December 27, 1987; 15:00	Galatasaray Yurtiçi Kargo	3–0	Silahlı Kuvvetler SK	Burhan Felek Spor Salonu, Istanbul; Referees: Ali Özarboy, Orhan Utkan
December 27, 1987; 15:00	(15–5, 15–8, 15–8) [ (Report)]			Burhan Felek Spor Salonu, Istanbul; Referees: Ali Özarboy, Orhan Utkan

January 9, 1988; 14:00	Galatasaray Yurtiçi Kargo	3–2	Arçelik SK	Burhan Felek Spor Salonu, Istanbul; Referees: Haluk Tuncay, Kazım Güleken
January 9, 1988; 14:00	(15–11, 11–15, 15–9, 11–15, 15–13) [ (Report)]			Burhan Felek Spor Salonu, Istanbul; Referees: Haluk Tuncay, Kazım Güleken

January 17, 1988; 12:30	Petrolofisi SK	1–3	Galatasaray Yurtiçi Kargo	Selim Sırrı Tarcan Spor Salonu, Ankara; Referees: Özer Ayınol, İbrahim Karadut
January 17, 1988; 12:30	(8–15, 16–14, 6–15, 4–15) [ (Report)]			Selim Sırrı Tarcan Spor Salonu, Ankara; Referees: Özer Ayınol, İbrahim Karadut

January 23, 1988; 14:00	Galatasaray Yurtiçi Kargo	3–0	Fenerbahçe	Burhan Felek Spor Salonu, Istanbul; Referees: Akın Ira, Orhan Utkan
January 23, 1988; 14:00	(15–3, 15–7, 15–10) [ (Report)]			Burhan Felek Spor Salonu, Istanbul; Referees: Akın Ira, Orhan Utkan

January 30, 1988; 14:00	Galatasaray Yurtiçi Kargo	3–1	G.S. Altınyurt SK	Burhan Felek Spor Salonu, Istanbul; Referees: Ali Özarboy, Orhan Utkan
January 30, 1988; 14:00	[ (Report)]			Burhan Felek Spor Salonu, Istanbul; Referees: Ali Özarboy, Orhan Utkan

February 7, 1988; 14:00	Galatasaray Yurtiçi Kargo	3–0	Ziraat Bankası SK	Selim Sırrı Tarcan Spor Salonu, Ankara; Referees: Aydın Öztürk Akif Paçacı
February 7, 1988; 14:00	(15–11, 15–11, 15–9) [ (Report)]			Selim Sırrı Tarcan Spor Salonu, Ankara; Referees: Aydın Öztürk Akif Paçacı

===== Second half =====
February 20, 1988; 15:30	Galatasaray Yurtiçi Kargo	3–0	Eczacıbaşı SK	Burhan Felek Spor Salonu, Istanbul
February 20, 1988; 15:30	(15–12, 15–11, 15–1) [ (Report)]			Burhan Felek Spor Salonu, Istanbul

February 27, 1988; 14:00	Sönmez Filament SK	3–1	Galatasaray Yurtiçi Kargo	Atatürk Spor Salonu, Bursa; Referees: Haluk Tuncay
February 27, 1988; 14:00	(15–9, 7–15, 15–12, 15–0) [ (Report)]			Atatürk Spor Salonu, Bursa; Referees: Haluk Tuncay

March 5, 1988; 14:00	Emlak Kredi SK	3–1	Galatasaray Yurtiçi Kargo	Selim Sırrı Tarcan Spor Salonu, Ankara; Referees: Haluk Tuncay
March 5, 1988; 14:00	(6–15, 15–8, 15–12, 15–6) [ (Report)]			Selim Sırrı Tarcan Spor Salonu, Ankara; Referees: Haluk Tuncay

March 9, 1988; 15:30	Galatasaray Yurtiçi Kargo	3–0	Petrolofisi SK	Burhan Felek Spor Salonu, Istanbul; Referees: Tuncer Orhan, Atilla Erinç
March 9, 1988; 15:30	[ (Report)]			Burhan Felek Spor Salonu, Istanbul; Referees: Tuncer Orhan, Atilla Erinç

March 14, 1988; 15:30	Galatasaray Yurtiçi Kargo	3–1	Karşıyaka	Konya
March 14, 1988; 15:30	(15–11, 15–13, 4–15, 15–9) [ (Report)]			Konya

March 26, 1988; 13:30	Silahlı Kuvvetler SK	0–3	Galatasaray Yurtiçi Kargo	Selim Sırrı Tarcan Spor Salonu, Ankara; Referees: Haluk Tuncay
March 26, 1988; 13:30	[ (Report)]			Selim Sırrı Tarcan Spor Salonu, Ankara; Referees: Haluk Tuncay

April 3, 1988; 15:30	Galatasaray Yurtiçi Kargo	3–0	Arçelik SK	Burhan Felek Spor Salonu, Istanbul; Referees: Tuncer Orhan, Atilla Erinç
April 3, 1988; 15:30	(15–7, 15–12, 15–8) [ (Report)]			Burhan Felek Spor Salonu, Istanbul; Referees: Tuncer Orhan, Atilla Erinç

May 7, 1988; 13:30	Fenerbahçe	0–3	Galatasaray Yurtiçi Kargo	Burhan Felek Spor Salonu, Istanbul; Referees: Kadir İlbeyli, Ali Özerbey
May 7, 1988; 13:30	(4–15, 7–15, 9–15) [ (Report)]			Burhan Felek Spor Salonu, Istanbul; Referees: Kadir İlbeyli, Ali Özerbey

June 12, 1988; 15:30	Galatasaray Yurtiçi Kargo	3–2	G.S. Altınyurt SK	Burhan Felek Spor Salonu, Istanbul; Referees: Haluk Tuncay, Mehmet Kadiroğlu
June 12, 1988; 15:30	(15–12, 12–15, 15–11, 7–15, 15–11) [ (Report)]			Burhan Felek Spor Salonu, Istanbul; Referees: Haluk Tuncay, Mehmet Kadiroğlu

June 19, 1988; 15:30	Galatasaray Yurtiçi Kargo	3–0	Ziraat Bankası SK	Burhan Felek Spor Salonu, Istanbul; Referees: Aydın Öztürk, Orhan Utkan
June 19, 1988; 15:30	(15–5, 12–6, 15–9) [ (Report)]			Burhan Felek Spor Salonu, Istanbul; Referees: Aydın Öztürk, Orhan Utkan

=== Milli Eğitim Gençlik ve Spor Bakanlığı Cup 1988 ===
June 26, 1988; 14:25	Galatasaray Yurtiçi Kargo	2–3	Sönmez Filament SK	Selim Sırrı Tarcan Spor Salonu, Ankara; Referees: Aydın Öztürk, Haluk Tuncay
June 26, 1988; 14:25	(10–15, 15–13, 7–15, 15–11, 10–15) [ (Report)]			Selim Sırrı Tarcan Spor Salonu, Ankara; Referees: Aydın Öztürk, Haluk Tuncay

=== CEV European Champions Cup 1988 ===
November 5, 1988; 14:00	Galatasaray Yurtiçi Kargo	3–1	OK Vojvodina	Burhan Felek Spor Salonu, Istanbul; Referees: Moldoveanu, Tuncer Orhan
November 5, 1988; 14:00	(15–9, 14–16, 15–6, 15–13) [ (Report)]			Burhan Felek Spor Salonu, Istanbul; Referees: Moldoveanu, Tuncer Orhan

November 12, 1988; 14:00	OK Vojvodina	3–0	Galatasaray Yurtiçi Kargo	Vojvodina, Yugoslavia
November 12, 1988; 14:00	(15–4, 15–6, 15–6) [ (Report)]			Vojvodina, Yugoslavia
