= 1970–71 Galatasaray S.K. (men's volleyball) season =

Galatasaray YK
1970–71 season
- Chairman: (Turkey) Selahattin Beyazıt
- Manager: (Turkey) Oral Yılmaz
- Turkish Volleyball League: 1st

Galatasaray SK. Men's 1970–71 season is the 1970–1971 volleyball season for Turkish professional basketball club Galatasaray Yurtiçi Kargo.

The club competes in:

- Turkish Men's Volleyball League

== Team roster season 1970–71 ==
Shirt No	Nationality	Player
1	Turkey	Yalçın Gördürür (cpt.)
2	Turkey	Nizamettin
3	Turkey	Mustafa Salar
4	Turkey	Haldun Bazlar
7	Turkey	Yalçın Sarısözen
8	Turkey	Erdal Önder
9	Turkey	Değer Eraybar
10	Turkey	Yavuz Işılay
11	Turkey	Aslan Çakır
12	Turkey	Mustafa İzkır
13	Turkey	Tevfik Aynel

== Results, schedules and standings ==
Results

Pos	Team	Total					
		Pts	Pld	W	L	F	A
1	Galatasaray SK	27	14	13	1	41	14
2	Göztepe SK	24	14	10	4	37	22
3	İETT SK	22	14	8	6	32	27
4	İtfaiye SK	22	14	8	6	28	25
5	TED Kolejliler	20	14	6	8	29	30
6	Muhafızgücü	20	14	6	8	26	30
7	Suspor	18	14	4	10	22	25
8	PTT	15	14	1	13	9	41

Pts=Points, Pld=Matches played, W=Matches won, L=Matches lost, F=Points for, A=Points against

=== Turkish Volleyball League 1970–71 ===
==== Regular season ====
October 17, 1970; 19:15	Galatasaray Yurtiçi Kargo	3–2	Göztepe SK	Spor Sergi Sarayı, Istanbul
October 17, 1970; 19:15	[ (Report)]			Spor Sergi Sarayı, Istanbul

October 18, 1970; 19:15	İtfaiye	3–2	Galatasaray Yurtiçi Kargo	Spor Sergi Sarayı, Istanbul
October 18, 1970; 19:15	[ (Report)]			Spor Sergi Sarayı, Istanbul

October 26, 1970; 19:00	Galatasaray Yurtiçi Kargo	3–1	İETT	Spor Sergi Sarayı, Istanbul
October 26, 1970; 19:00	(15–10, 14–16, 15–13, 15–11) [ (Report)]			Spor Sergi Sarayı, Istanbul

October 31, 1970; 19:15	Galatasaray Yurtiçi Kargo	3–1	Suspor	Spor Sergi Sarayı, Istanbul
October 31, 1970; 19:15	(15–5, 15–2, 15–5) [ (Report)]			Spor Sergi Sarayı, Istanbul

November 1, 1970; 19:15	Galatasaray Yurtiçi Kargo	3–0	Muhafızgücü	Spor Sergi Sarayı, Istanbul
November 1, 1970; 19:15	(15–6, 15–5, 15–12) [ (Report)]			Spor Sergi Sarayı, Istanbul

November 14, 1970	PTT	0–3	Galatasaray Yurtiçi Kargo	İzmir
November 14, 1970	(14–16, 6–15, 12–15) [ (Report)]			İzmir

November 21, 1970; 17:00	TED Kolejliler	2–3	Galatasaray Yurtiçi Kargo	Selim Sırrı Tarcan, Ankara
November 21, 1970; 17:00	(15–13, 15–9, 6–15, 7–15, 11–15) [ (Report)]			Selim Sırrı Tarcan, Ankara

December 13, 1970	Galatasaray Yurtiçi Kargo	3–0	İtfaiye	Spor Sergi Sarayı, Istanbul
December 13, 1970	[ (Report)]			Spor Sergi Sarayı, Istanbul

December 20, 1970	İETT	1–3	Galatasaray Yurtiçi Kargo	Spor Sergi Sarayı, Istanbul
December 20, 1970	(9–15, 9–15, 15–2, 13–15) [ (Report)]			Spor Sergi Sarayı, Istanbul

December 26, 1970	Göztepe SK	2–3	Galatasaray Yurtiçi Kargo	İzmir; Referees: İsmail Esemen, Özer Aydınol
December 26, 1970	(7–15, 15–3, 15–12, 7–15, 11–15) [ (Report)]			İzmir; Referees: İsmail Esemen, Özer Aydınol

January 2, 1971	Suspor	0–3	Galatasaray Yurtiçi Kargo	Selim Sırrı Tarcan Spor Salonu, Ankara
January 2, 1971	(9–15, 9–15, 13–15) [ (Report)]			Selim Sırrı Tarcan Spor Salonu, Ankara

January 9, 1971; 17:00	Muhafızgücü	1–3	Galatasaray Yurtiçi Kargo	Selim Sırrı Tarcan Spor Salonu, Ankara
January 9, 1971; 17:00	(14–16, 16–14, 10–15, 10–15) [ (Report)]			Selim Sırrı Tarcan Spor Salonu, Ankara

January 17, 1971	Galatasaray Yurtiçi Kargo	3–2	TED Kolejliler	Istanbul
January 17, 1971	(11–15, 10–15, 15–4, 15–5, 15–5) [ (Report)]			Istanbul

January 24, 1971	Galatasaray Yurtiçi Kargo	3–0	PTT	Istanbul
January 24, 1971	(15–5, 15–1, 15–3) [ (Report)]			Istanbul
