= Oleg Antonov (volleyball) =

Italian volleyball player

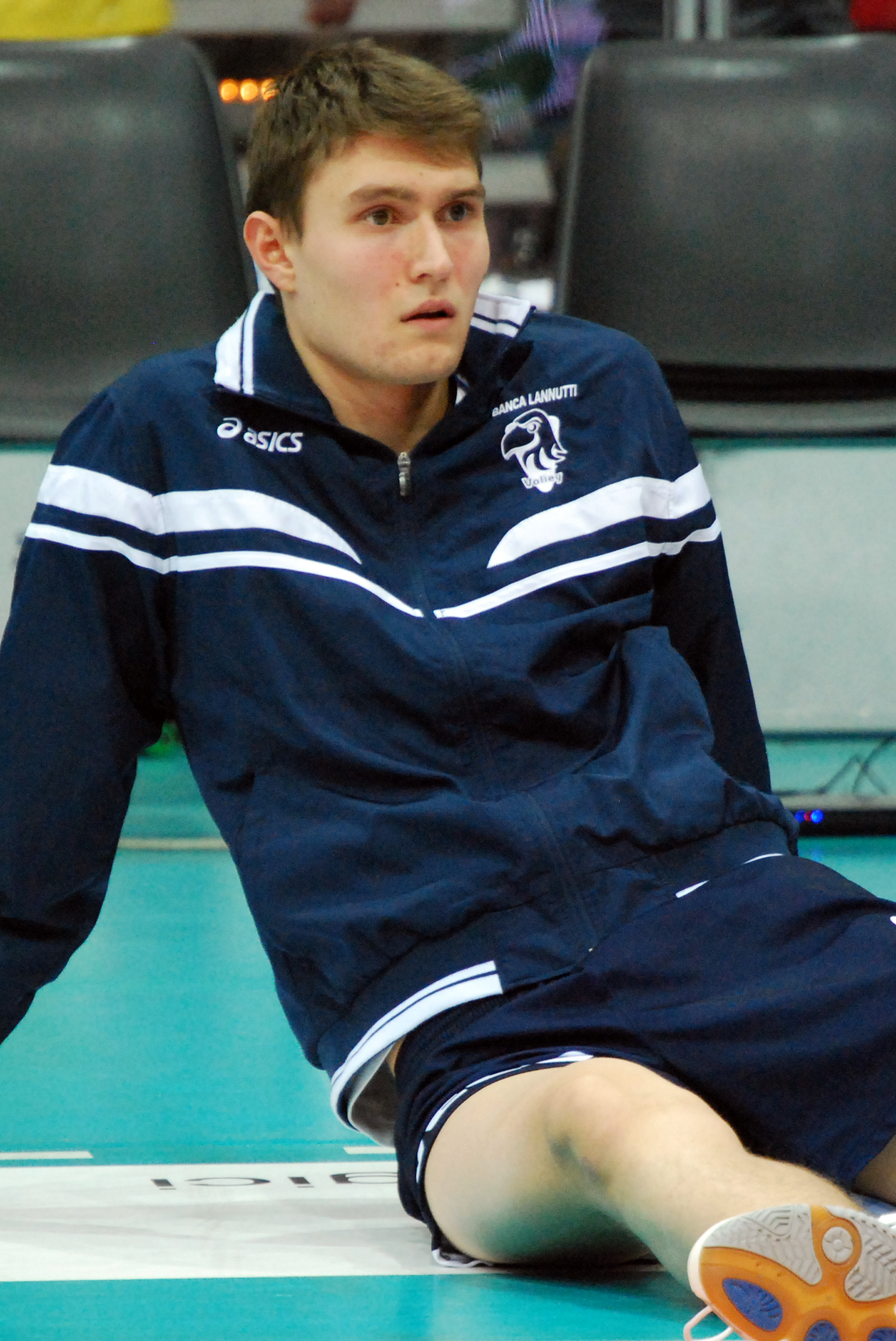

Personal information
- Nationality: Russian; Italian
- Born: 28 July 1988 (age 38); Moscow, Soviet Union
- Height: 1.98 m (6 ft 6 in)
- Weight: 86 kg (190 lb)
- Spike: 346 cm (136 in)
- Block: 320 cm (126 in)

Volleyball information
- Position: Outside hitter
- Current club: Yuasa Battery Grottazzolina

Career
Years	Teams
2006–2009; 2009–2010; 2010–2011; 2011–2012; 2012–2014; 2014–2015; 2015–2017; 2017–2018; 2018; 2018–2019; 2019–2020; 2020–2022; 2022–2023; 2023–2024; 2024–	Sisley Treviso; Pallavolo Mantova; Pallavolo Genova; Sisley Treviso; Piemonte Volley; Tours VB; Diatec Trentino; Volley Callipo; Ziraat Bankası; Ural Ufa; Galatasaray; Bluenergy Piacenza; Prisma Taranto Volley; Nova; Yuasa Battery Grottazzolina

National team
2015–2019	Italy
Honours
Men's volleyball
Representing Italy
Olympic Games
Silver medal – second place	2016 Rio de Janeiro	Team
World Cup
Silver medal – second place	2015 Japan
World Grand Champions Cup
Silver medal – second place	2017 Japan
European Championship
Bronze medal – third place	2015 Bulgaria/Italy
- Last updated: 17 September 2017

Oleg Yaroslavovich Antonov (Russian: Олег Ярославович Антонов; born 28 July 1988) is a Russian-born Italian volleyball player, a member of the Italian club Grottazzolina Volley; silver medalist of the 2015 World Cup, bronze medalist of the 2015 European Championship with Italy men's national volleyball team.

== Personal life ==
Antonov is the son of Yaroslav Antonov, a Russian former volleyball player who was a 1988 Summer Olympics silver medalist for the Soviet Union.

== Sporting achievements ==
=== Clubs ===
==== FIVB Club World Championship ====
- 2016 - with Trentino Diatec

==== CEV Champions League ====
- 2015/2016 - with Trentino Diatec

==== National championships ====
- 2016/2017 Italian Championship, with Diatec Trentino

=== National team ===
- 2015 FIVB World Cup
- 2016 Olympic Games
