= Necdet Ronabar =

Turkish basketball player (born 1956)

Necdet Ronabar (born 1956) was a Turkish basketball player.

Born in 1956, Ronabar received his basketball training at Fenerbahçe before transferring to Muhafızgücü. Standing at 1.94 metres tall, he began playing as a centre and power forward. He gained attention for his successful basketball career at Efes Pilsen between 1979 and 1983, rising to the national team. Winning the 1982-83 Turkish Basketball League championship with this team, Ronabar returned to Fenerbahçe in 1983.

He wore the yellow and navy blue jersey for another seven consecutive years until 1990 and served as the team captain. During this period, he experienced the joy of winning the regular season championship in 1984–85, 1987–88 and 1989–90, the 1990 Presidential Cup championship, the 1985 and 1988 Presidential Cup finals, the 1988 Youth and Sports Directorate Cup championship, and numerous special tournament championships. He ended his active basketball career on 26 September 1990 with a farewell match in the first round of the European Champions Cup against Belgium's Pepinster team. During his time at Fenerbahçe, he was nicknamed Baba Necdet (Father Necdet) due to his determination to win despite his advancing age.

Ronabar remained involved in basketball, first as an assistant coach and later as manager of the Fenerbahçe basketball team.
