= 1988–89 Galatasaray S.K. (men's volleyball) season =

Galatasaray YK
1988–89 season
- Chairman: (Turkey) Ali Tanrıyar
- Manager: (Turkey) Enver Göçener
- Turkish Volleyball League: 1st
- TSYD Cup: 2nd

Galatasaray SK. Men's 1988–89 season is the 1988–89 volleyball season for Turkish professional basketball club Galatasaray Yurtiçi Kargo.

The club competes in:

- Turkish Men's Volleyball League
- CEV Champions Cup

== Team roster season 1988–89 ==
Shirt No	Nationality	Player
1	Turkey	Ahmet Gülüm
2	Turkey	İbrahim
3	Turkey	Hakan
4	Turkey	İsmet
7	Turkey	Paidar Demir
8	Turkey	Metin
9	Turkey	Habip
10	Turkey	Yücel
11	Turkey	Mustafa
12	Turkey	Ümit
13	Turkey	Metin Görgün
14	Turkey	Msadar Lahmoir
15	Turkey	Hüseyin

== Results, schedules and standings ==
Results

Pos	Team	Total					
		Pts	Pld	W	L	F	A
1	Eczacıbaşı SK	41	20	15	5	51	24
2	Sönmez Filament SK	35	20	15	5	50	30
3	Galatasaray	34	20	14	6	49	28
4	Emlak Kredi SK	34	20	14	6	50	33
5	Arçelik SK	33	20	13	7	47	29
6	Fenerbahçe	30	20	10	10	42	26
7	Karşıyaka	30	20	10	10	39	41
8	Ziraat Bankası SK	27	20	7	13	27	47
9	G.S. Altınyurt SK	26	20	6	14	30	46
10	Petrolofisi	25	20	5	15	30	50
11	B.Salat SK	21	20	1	19	8	59

Pts=Points, Pld=Matches played, W=Matches won, L=Matches lost, F=Sets for, A=Sets against

=== Turkish Volleyball League 1988–89 ===
==== Regular season ====
===== First half =====
October 1, 1988; 12:30	Sönmez Filament SK	3–2	Galatasaray Yurtiçi Kargo	Bursa; Referees: Aydın Öztürk, Akif Paçacı
October 1, 1988; 12:30	(11–15, 7–15, 15–8, 15–10, 16–14) [ (Report)]			Bursa; Referees: Aydın Öztürk, Akif Paçacı

October 8, 1988; 13:30	Galatasaray Yurtiçi Kargo	3–2	Eczacıbaşı SK	Burhan Felek Spor Salonu, Istanbul; Referees: Akın İra, Atilla Erinç
October 8, 1988; 13:30	(15–12, 16–14, 12–15, 12–15, 17–15) [ (Report)]			Burhan Felek Spor Salonu, Istanbul; Referees: Akın İra, Atilla Erinç

October 9, 1988; 13:30	Galatasaray Yurtiçi Kargo	3–1	Ziraat Bankası SK	Burhan Felek Spor Salonu, Istanbul; Referees: Uğur Karataş, Necati Ercan
October 9, 1988; 13:30	(15–2, 15–10, 14–16, 15–11) [ (Report)]			Burhan Felek Spor Salonu, Istanbul; Referees: Uğur Karataş, Necati Ercan

October 15, 1988; 13:30	Galatasaray Yurtiçi Kargo	3–1	Emlak Bankası SK	Burhan Felek Spor Salonu, Istanbul; Referees: Haluk Tuncay, Orhan Utkan
October 15, 1988; 13:30	(15–7, 7–15, 15–5, 15–8) [ (Report)]			Burhan Felek Spor Salonu, Istanbul; Referees: Haluk Tuncay, Orhan Utkan

October 16, 1988; 13:30	Galatasaray Yurtiçi Kargo	3–0	Petrolofisi SK	Burhan Felek Spor Salonu, Istanbul; Referees: Ergin Akıncı, Dilek Cebeci
October 16, 1988; 13:30	(15–11, 15–7, 15–8) [ (Report)]			Burhan Felek Spor Salonu, Istanbul; Referees: Ergin Akıncı, Dilek Cebeci

October 22, 1988; 12:30	Tuborg SK	1–3	Galatasaray Yurtiçi Kargo	İzmir
October 22, 1988; 12:30	[ (Report)]			İzmir

October 23, 1988; 12:30	Karşıyaka	2–3	Galatasaray Yurtiçi Kargo	İzmir; Referees: Mustafa Elitez, Uğur Karakaş
October 23, 1988; 12:30	(11–15, 15–13, 7–15, 15–5, 11–15) [ (Report)]			İzmir; Referees: Mustafa Elitez, Uğur Karakaş

October 29, 1988; 12:00	Galatasaray Yurtiçi Kargo	3–0	Arçelik SK	Burhan Felek Spor Salonu, Istanbul; Referees: Kadir İlbeyli, Mehmet Kadiroğlu
October 29, 1988; 12:00	[ (Report)]			Burhan Felek Spor Salonu, Istanbul; Referees: Kadir İlbeyli, Mehmet Kadiroğlu

October 30, 1988; 12:00	Galatasaray Yurtiçi Kargo	3–1	Fenerbahçe	Burhan Felek Spor Salonu, Istanbul; Referees: Tuncer Orhan, Necati Ercan
October 30, 1988; 12:00	(15–8, 8–15, 15–6, 15–13) [ (Report)]			Burhan Felek Spor Salonu, Istanbul; Referees: Tuncer Orhan, Necati Ercan

November 2, 1988; 12:00	Salat SK	2–3	Galatasaray Yurtiçi Kargo	Tekirdağ; Referees: Mustafa Elitez, Uğur Karakaş
November 2, 1988; 12:00	(11–15, 15–13, 7–15, 15–5, 11–15) [ (Report)]			Tekirdağ; Referees: Mustafa Elitez, Uğur Karakaş

November 19, 1988; 12:00	G.S. Altınyurt SK	2–3	Galatasaray Yurtiçi Kargo	Caferağa Spor Salonu, Istanbul; Referees: Mustafa Elitez, Uğur Karakaş
November 19, 1988; 12:00	(11–15, 15–13, 7–15, 15–5, 11–15) [ (Report)]			Caferağa Spor Salonu, Istanbul; Referees: Mustafa Elitez, Uğur Karakaş

===== Second half =====
December 17, 1988; 12:00	Galatasaray Yurtiçi Kargo	3–1	Sönmez Filament SK	Burhan Felek Spor Salonu, Istanbul; Referees: Haluk Tuncay, Tuncer Orhan
December 17, 1988; 12:00	(15–8, 11–15, 15–8, 15–9) [ (Report)]			Burhan Felek Spor Salonu, Istanbul; Referees: Haluk Tuncay, Tuncer Orhan

December 18, 1988; 15:30	Galatasaray Yurtiçi Kargo	3–1	B.Salat SK	Burhan Felek Spor Salonu, Istanbul
December 18, 1988; 15:30	[ (Report)]			Burhan Felek Spor Salonu, Istanbul

December 24, 1988; 12:00	Eczacıbaşı SK	3–0	Galatasaray Yurtiçi Kargo	Istanbul
December 24, 1988; 12:00	(15–5, 15–11, 15–9) [ (Report)]			Istanbul

January 5, 1988; 12:00	Petrolofisi SK	1–3	Galatasaray Yurtiçi Kargo	Istanbul
January 5, 1988; 12:00	(15–5, 15–11, 15–9) [ (Report)]			Istanbul

January 8, 1988; 12:00	Emlak Bankası SK	3–0	Galatasaray Yurtiçi Kargo	Istanbul; Referees: Aydın Öztürk, Doğan Aslan
January 8, 1988; 12:00	(15–7, 15–11, 15–10) [ (Report)]			Istanbul; Referees: Aydın Öztürk, Doğan Aslan

January 15, 1989; 15:30	Galatasaray Yurtiçi Kargo	3–2	Karşıyaka	Burhan Felek Spor Salonu, Istanbul; Referees: Akın İra, Ergin Akıncı
January 15, 1989; 15:30	(14–16, 15–5, 15–11, 11–15, 15–3) [ (Report)]			Burhan Felek Spor Salonu, Istanbul; Referees: Akın İra, Ergin Akıncı

January 21, 1989; 15:30	Galatasaray Yurtiçi Kargo	0–3	Arçelik SK	Burhan Felek Spor Salonu, Istanbul; Referees: Akın İra, Hikmet Karamercan
January 21, 1989; 15:30	(10–15, 15–9, 15–5) [ (Report)]			Burhan Felek Spor Salonu, Istanbul; Referees: Akın İra, Hikmet Karamercan

January 22, 1989; 15:30	Galatasaray Yurtiçi Kargo	3–1	Fenerbahçe	Burhan Felek Spor Salonu, Istanbul; Referees: Akın İra, Hikmet Karamercan
January 22, 1989; 15:30	(10–15, 15–9, 15–5, 15–8) [ (Report)]			Burhan Felek Spor Salonu, Istanbul; Referees: Akın İra, Hikmet Karamercan

January 28, 1989; 15:30	Galatasaray Yurtiçi Kargo	3–0	G.S. Altınyurt SK	Burhan Felek Spor Salonu, Istanbul
January 28, 1989; 15:30	(15–10, 15–9, 15–6) [ (Report)]			Burhan Felek Spor Salonu, Istanbul

February 4, 1989; 12:00	Ziraat Bankası SK	2–3	Galatasaray Yurtiçi Kargo	Ankara; Referees: Doğan Aslan, Yaşar Karatay
February 4, 1989; 12:00	(12–15, 15–10, 15–13, 11–15, 11–15) [ (Report)]			Ankara; Referees: Doğan Aslan, Yaşar Karatay

=== Playoffs ===
==== Qualification Group A ====
February 23, 1989; 17:30	Galatasaray Yurtiçi Kargo	1–3	Arçelik SK	Burhan Felek Spor Salonu, Istanbul; Referees: Aydın Öztürk, Uğur Karakaş
February 23, 1989; 17:30	(15–11, 11–15, 9–15, 10–15) [ (Report)]			Burhan Felek Spor Salonu, Istanbul; Referees: Aydın Öztürk, Uğur Karakaş

February 24, 1989; 17:30	Galatasaray Yurtiçi Kargo	3–1	Karşıyaka	Burhan Felek Spor Salonu, Istanbul
February 24, 1989; 17:30	[ (Report)]			Burhan Felek Spor Salonu, Istanbul

February 25, 1989; 17:30	Galatasaray Yurtiçi Kargo	3–0	Eczacıbaşı SK	Burhan Felek Spor Salonu, Istanbul; Referees: Aydın Öztürk, Uğur Karakaş
February 25, 1989; 17:30	(15–11, 15–9, 15–11) [ (Report)]			Burhan Felek Spor Salonu, Istanbul; Referees: Aydın Öztürk, Uğur Karakaş

March 3, 1989; 17:30	Galatasaray Yurtiçi Kargo	2–3	Arçelik SK	Burhan Felek Spor Salonu, Istanbul; Referees: Tuncer Orhan, Hilmi Karamercan
March 3, 1989; 17:30	(5–15, 10–15, 15–11, 15–9, 13–15) [ (Report)]			Burhan Felek Spor Salonu, Istanbul; Referees: Tuncer Orhan, Hilmi Karamercan

March 4, 1989; 17:30	Galatasaray Yurtiçi Kargo	3–0	Karşıyaka	Burhan Felek Spor Salonu, Istanbul; Referees: Doğan Aslan, Kadir İlbeyli
March 4, 1989; 17:30	(15–12, 15–4, 15–6) [ (Report)]			Burhan Felek Spor Salonu, Istanbul; Referees: Doğan Aslan, Kadir İlbeyli

March 5, 1989; 17:30	Galatasaray Yurtiçi Kargo	3–0	Eczacıbaşı SK	Burhan Felek Spor Salonu, Istanbul; Referees: Haluk Tuncay, Doğan Aslan
March 5, 1989; 17:30	(15–7, 15–9, 15–5) [ (Report)]			Burhan Felek Spor Salonu, Istanbul; Referees: Haluk Tuncay, Doğan Aslan

==== FINAL group ====
Results

Pos	Team	Total					
		Pts	Pld	W	L	F	A
1	Galatasaray	6	3	3	0	9	4
2	Sönmez Filament SK	5	3	2	1	8	5
3	Eczacıbaşı SK	4	3	1	2	4	7
4	Emlak Bankası SK	3	3	0	3	4	9

Pts=Points, Pld=Matches played, W=Matches won, L=Matches lost, F=Sets for, A=Sets against

March 23, 1989; 15:30	Galatasaray Yurtiçi Kargo	3–2	Emlak Bankası SK	Burhan Felek Spor Salonu, Istanbul; Referees: Mustafa Elitez, Haluk Tuncay
March 23, 1989; 15:30	(7–15, 15–9, 12–15, 15–11, 15–13) [ (Report)]			Burhan Felek Spor Salonu, Istanbul; Referees: Mustafa Elitez, Haluk Tuncay

March 24, 1989; 15:30	Galatasaray Yurtiçi Kargo	3–2	Sönmez Filament SK	Burhan Felek Spor Salonu, Istanbul; Referees: Akın İra, Aydın Öztürk
March 24, 1989; 15:30	(16–14, 9–15, 12–15, 15–13, 15–13) [ (Report)]			Burhan Felek Spor Salonu, Istanbul; Referees: Akın İra, Aydın Öztürk

March 25, 1989; 15:30	Galatasaray Yurtiçi Kargo	3–2	Eczacıbaşı SK	Burhan Felek Spor Salonu, Istanbul; Referees: Haluk Tuncay, Tuncer Orhan
March 25, 1989; 15:30	(17–15, 15–11, 15–12) [ (Report)]			Burhan Felek Spor Salonu, Istanbul; Referees: Haluk Tuncay, Tuncer Orhan

=== Turkish Cup 1988 ===
November 23, 1988; 15:00	Galatasaray Yurtiçi Kargo	3–0	Samsun DSİ SK	İstanbul; Referees: Ahmet Keten, İsmail Uyguner
November 23, 1988; 15:00	(15–7, 15–5, 15–5) [ (Report)]			İstanbul; Referees: Ahmet Keten, İsmail Uyguner

November 27, 1988; 14:00	Samsun DSİ	1–3	Galatasaray Yurtiçi Kargo	Samsun
November 27, 1988; 14:00	[ (Report)]			Samsun

December 28, 1988; 16:30	Galatasaray Yurtiçi Kargo	3–0	Emlak Bankası SK	İstanbul; Referees: Akın İra, Mehmet Kadiroğlu
December 28, 1988; 16:30	(9–15, 10–15, 15–17) [ (Report)]			İstanbul; Referees: Akın İra, Mehmet Kadiroğlu

January 5, 1989; 17:00	Emlak Bankası SK	1–3	Galatasaray Yurtiçi Kargo	Selim Sırrı Tarcan Spor Salonu, Ankara
January 5, 1989; 17:00	(15–12, 13–15, 8–15, 5–15) [ (Report)]			Selim Sırrı Tarcan Spor Salonu, Ankara

=== CEV European Champions Cup 1989 ===
November 4, 1989; 14:00	Galatasaray Yurtiçi Kargo	3–1	Leipzig Volleyball Club	Referees: Gnedoi Vladimir(USSR), Ali Özerbey(TUR)
November 4, 1989; 14:00	(7–15, 15–8, 13–15, 6–15) [ (Report)]			Referees: Gnedoi Vladimir(USSR), Ali Özerbey(TUR)

November 5, 1989; 14:00	Leipzig	3–0	Galatasaray Yurtiçi Kargo	Leipzig, East Germany
November 5, 1989; 14:00	[ (Report)]			Leipzig, East Germany

=== TSYD Cup 1988 ===
September 22, 1988; 14:00	Galatasaray Yurtiçi Kargo	3–0	Sönmez Filament SK	Burhan Felek Spor Salonu, Istanbul; Referees: Moldoveanu, Tuncer Orhan
September 22, 1988; 14:00	[ (Report)]			Burhan Felek Spor Salonu, Istanbul; Referees: Moldoveanu, Tuncer Orhan
