= Turkish Men's Volleyball Championship =

- Sport: Volleyball
- Founded: 1948
- Folded: 1970
- Country: Turkey
- Last champion: İBB (1 title)
- Most titles: Galatasaray (12 titles)
- Website: tvf.org.tr

The Turkish Men's Volleyball Championship (Turkish: Türkiye Erkekler Voleybol Şampiyonası) was a top-level volleyball league competition in Turkish volleyball, run by the Turkish Volleyball Federation from 1948 to 1970.

== Champions ==
Year	Winners	Runners-up	Third place	Fourth place	Date and Place
1948	Vefa	Ankaragücü	Mülkiye	Altay	Ankara, 21–23 May 1948
1949	Beyoğluspor	Vefa	Eskişehir Havagücü	Gençlerbirliği	İstanbul, 12–15 May 1949
1950	Beyoğluspor	Galatasaray	Gençlerbirliği	Mülkiye	Ankara, May 1950
1951	Beyoğluspor	Gençlerbirliği	İzmit Kağıtspor	Altınordu	1951
1952	Beyoğluspor	Galatasaray	Altınordu	-	1952
1953	Beyoğluspor	Galatasaray	Harp Okulu	Altınordu	İstanbul, 19–21 December 1952
1954	Not held				
1955	Galatasaray	Ankara Hilal SK	Altay	Kayseri Havagücü	1955
1956	Galatasaray	Darüşşafaka	Ankara Demirspor	-	Ankara, 24–26 February 1956
1957	Galatasaray	Darüşşafaka	Ankara Hilal SK	Kale İstatistik	İstanbul, 20–24 March 1957
1958	Galatasaray	Darüşşafaka	Ankara Hilal SK	Kale İstatistik	İstanbul, 14–18 May 1958
1959	Darüşşafaka	Bakırköyspor	Galatasaray	Ankara Hilal SK	İstanbul, 23–26 April 1959
1960	Galatasaray	Darüşşafaka	Beykozspor	Ankara Hilal SK	İstanbul, 29 March-2 April 1960
1961	Galatasaray	Darüşşafaka	Beykozspor	Harp Okulu	Ankara, 29 March-2 April 1961
1962	Galatasaray	Darüşşafaka	Fenerbahçe	Harp Okulu	İstanbul, 4–8 April 1962
1963	Galatasaray	Harp Okulu	Bakırköyspor	Rasimpaşa	İstanbul, 10–14 April 1963
1964	Galatasaray	Suspor	Rasimpaşa	Fenerbahçe	Ankara, 15–19 April 1964
1965	Galatasaray	Muhafızgücü	Suspor	Fenerbahçe	İzmir, 9–11 April 1965
1966	Galatasaray	Suspor	Muhafızgücü	Fenerbahçe	Ankara, 14–16 May 1966
1967	Galatasaray	Muhafızgücü	Fenerbahçe	Rasimpaşa	İzmir, 23–26 March 1967
1968	Muhafızgücü	Suspor	Fenerbahçe	Galatasaray	İstanbul/Ankara, 10 May-18 June 1968
1969	Muhafızgücü	Suspor	Galatasaray	Fenerbahçe	Ankara/İstanbul, 15–27 May 1969
1970	İBB	ODTÜ	İtfaiye	DSİ Spor	Ankara, 29 April-3 May 1970

== Performance by club ==
Club	Titles	Runners-up
Galatasaray	12	3
Beyoğluspor	5	0
Muhafızgücü	2	2
Darüşşafaka	1	6
Vefa	1	1
İBB	1	0
Suspor	0	4
ODTÜ	0	1
Gençlerbirliği	0	1
Ankara Hilal SK	0	1
Harp Okulu	0	1
