= Semih =

Semih is a Turkish given name for males, meaning Generous and also Worthy and Great. Semiha is the female form. People named Semih include:

- Semih Aydilek (born 1989), Turkish footballer
- Semih Çalışkan (born 1986), Turkish novelist
- Semih Deniz (born 1989), Turkish Paralympian middle-distance runner
- Semih Erden (born 1986), Turkish basketball player
- Semih Kaplanoğlu (born 1963), Turkish playwright, film director and producer
- Semih Kaya (born 1991), Turkish footballer
- Semih Özmert (1921-2015), Turkish judge
- Semih Saygıner (born 1964), Turkish carom billiards player
- Semih Şentürk (born 1983), Turkish footballer
- Semih Tezcan (born 1932), Turkish scientist
- Semih Tufan Gülaltay (born 1968), Turkish criminal
- Semih Yağcı (born 1988), Turkish weightlifter
