= Necdet =

Necdet (pronounced [nedʒdet]) is a Turkish given name for males. People named Necdet include:

- Necdet Ayaz (born 1958), Turkish long-distance runner
- Necdet Calp (1922–1998), Turkish civil servant and politician
- Necdet Cici (1912 – 1995), Turkish footballer
- Necdet Darıcıoğlu (1926–2016), Turkish judge
- Necdet Karababa (born 1935), Turkish politician
- Necdet Kent (1911–2002), Turkish diplomat
- Necdet Mahfi Ayral (1908 – 2004), Turkish actor
- Necdet Menzir (1945 – 2013), Turkish bureaucrat and politician
- Necdet Niş (1937 – 2018), Turkish football player and manager
- Necdet Ergün (born 1954), Turkish football coach and player.
- Necdet Özel (born 1950), Turkish general
- Necdet Öztorun (1924 – 2010), Turkish general
- Necdet Şentürk (born 1925), Turkish footballer
- Ahmet Necdet Sezer (born 1941), Turkish politician and 10th President of Turkey
- Necdet Tosun (1926 – 1975), Turkish actor and producer
- Necdet Turhan (born 1957), Turkish visually impaired mountain climber and long distance runner
- Necdet Uğur (1923 – 2004), Turkish politician
- Necdet Ünüvar (born 1960), Turkish politician
- Necdet Uran (1910 – 1973), Turkish admiral
- Necdet Üruğ (1921 – 2021), Turkish general
- Necdet Yaşar (1930–2017), Turkish musician

== See also ==
- Nejdet
