= Yuasa Battery Grottazzolina =

Italian volleyball team

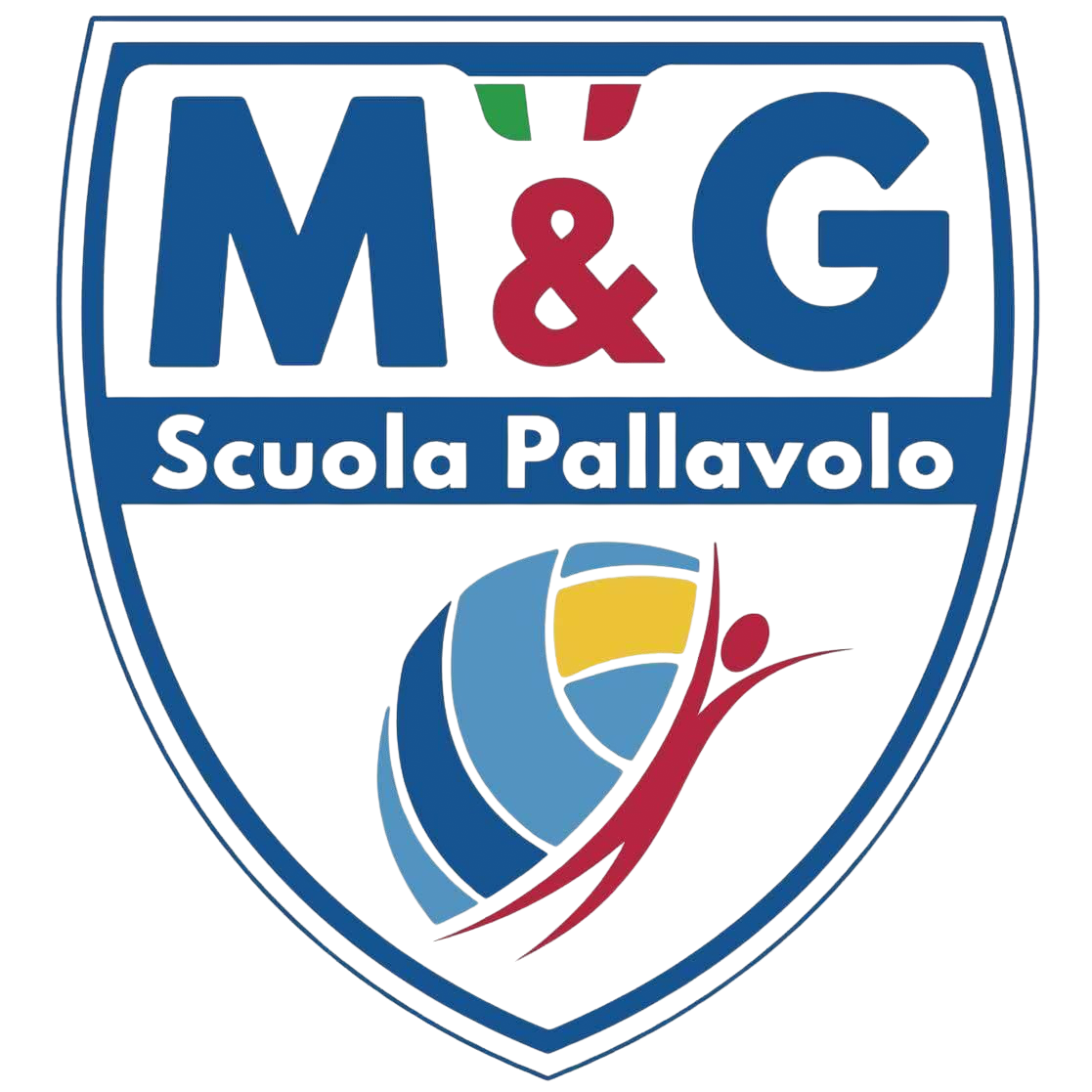
- Full name: M&G Pallavolo
- Nickname: Yuasa Battery Grottazzolina
- Founded: 2008
- Ground: PalaSavelli
- Chairman: Rossano Romiti
- Manager: Massimiliano Ortenzi
- League: Italian Volleyball League
- Website: Club home page

Uniforms
Home	Away

Yuasa Battery Grottazzolina is an Italian professional men's volleyball team based in Grottazzolina playing in the SuperLega, which is the highest level of the Italian Volleyball League, since 2024 when the team won the promotion.

== History ==
The team was founded in the 2008 by the M&G Volleyball School born by the union of two already existing volleyball clubs Wild Volley Grottazzolina and Montegiorgio Volley.

The team name's was Videx Grottazzolina before Yuasa Battery Grottazzolina and Videx became the historical sponsor.

== Team ==
Team roaster - season 2025/2026
No.	Name	Role	Date of Birth	Nationality
1	Amir Mohammad Golzadeh	Opposite hitter	May 2003, 9	Iran
2	Giulio Magalini	Outside hitter	July 1988, 28	Italy
3	Marco Cubito	Middle blocker	April 1992, 25	Italy
4	Riccardo Vecchi	Libero	April 1996, 1	Italy
5	Marco Falaschi	Setter	September 1987, 19	Bulgaria
7	Dragan Stankovic	Middle blocker	October 1985, 18	Italy
8	Marco Pellacani	Middle blocker	November 2004, 27	Italy
9	Iliya Petkov	Middle blocker	October 1996, 10	Bulgaria
12	Dušan Petković	Opposite	January 1992, 27	Serbia
13	Michele Fedrizzi	Setter	May 1991, 21	Italy
15	Manuele Marchiani	Setter	April 1989, 5	Italy
18	Lazar Koprivica	Outside hitter	November 1991, 8	Serbia
21	Georgi Tatarov	Setter	May 2003, 10	Bulgaria
44	Andrea Marchisio	Libero	November 1990, 6	Italy

Team roaster - season 2024/2025
No.	Name	Role	Date of Birth	Nationality
1	Tsimafei Zhukouski	P	December 1989, 18	Croatia
2	Oleg Antonov	S	July 1988, 28	Italy
3	Marco Cubito	C	April 1992, 25	Italy
4	Riccardo Vecchi	S	April 1996, 1	Italy
6	Danny Demyanenko	C	July 1994, 13	Canada
7	Andrea Mattei	C	July 1993, 23	Italy
10	Francesco Comparoni	C	June 2001, 22	Italy
12	Dušan Petković	O	January 1992, 27	Serbia
13	Michele Fedrizzi	S	May 1991, 21	Italy
15	Manuele Marchiani	P	April 1989, 5	Italy
16	Andrea Romiti	P	February 2007, 7	Italy
18	Diego Foresi	L	December 2007, 13	Italy
20	Gabrijel Cvanciger	O	August 2003, 1	Croatia
21	Georgi Tatarov	S	May 2003, 10	Bulgaria
44	Andrea Marchisio	L	November 1990, 6	Italy
