= Nejdet =

Nejdet is a Turkish masculine given name. Notable people with the name include:

- Nejdet Atalay (born 1978), Turkish politician
- Nejdet Sançar (1910–1975), Turkish literature teacher
- Nejdet Zalev (born 1937), Bulgarian Olympic wrestler

== See also ==
- Necdet
