= Oğuz Çalışkan =

Turkish footballer

Personal information
- Date of birth: 7 November 1988 (age 38)
- Place of birth: Beypazarı, Turkey
- Height: 1.88 m (6 ft 2 in)
- Position: Goalkeeper

Senior career*
Years	Team	Apps	(Gls)
2006–2009	Ankaragücü	0	(0)
2008–2009	→ Karsspor (loan)		
2009–2010	Denizli Belediye		
2010–2011	Hatayspor	2	(0)
2011–2012	Diyarbakır BB	7	(0)
2012–2014	Gümüşhanespor	49	(0)
2014–2016	Şanlıurfaspor	2	(0)
2014–2015	→ Turgutluspor (loan)	36	(0)
2015–2016	→ Bugsaşspor (loan)	38	(0)
2016–2017	Gümüşhanespor	0	(0)
2017–2018	Bugsaşspor	30	(0)
2018–2021	Sakaryaspor	94	(0)
2021–2022	Ankara Demirspor	33	(0)
2022–2023	Iğdır	31	(0)
2023–2024	Menemen	13	(0)
2024–2025	Arnavutköy Belediyespor	43	(0)
- * Club domestic league appearances and goals

Oğuz Çalışkan (born 7 November 1988) is a Turkish former footballer who played as a goalkeeper.
