= Istanbul Men's Volleyball League =

Istanbul Volleyball League
- Sport: Volleyball
- Founded: 1921
- Folded: 1970
- Country: Turkey
- Most titles: Galatasaray (16 titles)
- Website: tvf.org.tr

The Istanbul Volleyball League (Turkish: İstanbul Erkekler Voleybol Ligi) is a defunct volleyball league competition in Turkey. It was run by the Turkish Volleyball Federation from 1921 to 1970.

== Champions ==
Year	Winners	Runners-up	Third
1921	Mühendis Mektebi	Kabataş Erkek Lisesi	Vefa SK
1922	Mühendis Mektebi	Kabataş Erkek Lisesi	?
1923	Mühendis Mektebi	Kabataş Erkek Lisesi	?
1924	Mühendis Mektebi	Kabataş Erkek Lisesi (Beşiktaş)	?
1925	Üsküdar İdman Ocağı	Kabataş Erkek Lisesi (Beşiktaş)	?
1926	Beşiktaş	Üsküdar İdman Ocağı	?
1927	Fenerbahçe	Beşiktaş	Vefa SK
1928	Fenerbahçe	Beşiktaş	Galatasaray
1929	Fenerbahçe	Beşiktaş	Galatasaray
1930	Fenerbahçe	Beşiktaş	?
1931	Cancelled		
1932	Galatasaray	Beşiktaş	Fenerbahçe
1933	Fenerbahçe	Beşiktaş	İstanbulspor
1934	Fenerbahçe	Feneryılmaz	
1935	Galatasaray	Fenerbahçe	Feneryılmaz
1936	Feneryılmaz	Galatasaray	
1937	Feneryılmaz	Hilal SK	
1938	Hilal SK	Feneryılmaz	
1939	Not held		
1940	Not held		
1941	Fenerbahçe	Galatasaray	
1942	Beyoğluspor	Galatasaray	
1943	Beyoğluspor	Galatasaray	
1944	Galatasaray	Beyoğluspor	
1945	Galatasaray	Beyoğluspor	
1946	Beyoğluspor	Fenerbahçe	Galatasaray
1947	Vefa		
1948	Vefa	Galatasaray	
1949	Beyoğluspor	Galatasaray	
1950	Cancelled		
1951	Beyoğluspor	Galatasaray	
1952	Beyoğluspor	Galatasaray	Altınordu
1953	Galatasaray	Beyoğluspor	
1954	Not held		
1955	Galatasaray		
1956	Galatasaray	Beyoğluspor	Darüşşafaka
1957	Galatasaray	Darüşşafaka	Bakırköyspor
1958	Darüşşafaka	Galatasaray	Kadıköyspor
1959	Galatasaray	Darüşşafaka	Bakırköyspor
1960	Galatasaray	Darüşşafaka	Beykozspor
1961	Galatasaray	Beykozspor	Darüşşafaka
1962	Galatasaray	Darüşşafaka	Fenerbahçe
1963	Galatasaray	Fenerbahçe	Rasimpaşa
1964	Galatasaray	Fenerbahçe	Rasimpaşa
1965	Galatasaray	Fenerbahçe	Rasimpaşa
1966	Galatasaray	Fenerbahçe	İTÜ
1967	Fenerbahçe	Galatasaray	Rasimpaşa
1968	Fenerbahçe	Galatasaray	İTÜ
1969	Fenerbahçe	Galatasaray	İETT
1970	İtfaiye	Galatasaray	İETT

== Performance ==
Team	Titles	Runners-up
Galatasaray	16	13
Fenerbahçe	10	6
Beyoğluspor	6	4
Mühendis Mektebi	4	0
Feneryılmaz	2	2
Vefa SK	2	0
Beşiktaş	1	6
Darüşşafaka SK	1	4
Üsküdar İdman Ocağı	1	1
Hilal SK	1	1
İtfaiye	1	0
Kabataş Erkek Lisesi	0	5
