= Michele Fedrizzi =

Italian volleyball player (born 1991)

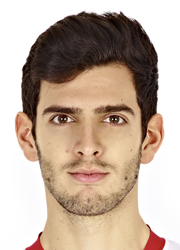

Personal information
- Nationality: Italian
- Born: 21 May 1991 (age 35)
- Height: 192 cm (6 ft 4 in)
- Weight: 80 kg (176 lb)
- Spike: 354 cm (139 in)
- Block: 325 cm (128 in)

Volleyball information
- Number: 15

Career
Years	Teams
2013	Trentino Diatec

National team
2013-2014	Italy

Michele Fedrizzi (born 21 May 1991) is an Italian male volleyball player. With his club Trentino Diatec he competed at the 2013 FIVB Volleyball Men's Club World Championship.
