= Gökçen Yüksel =

Turkish volleyball player

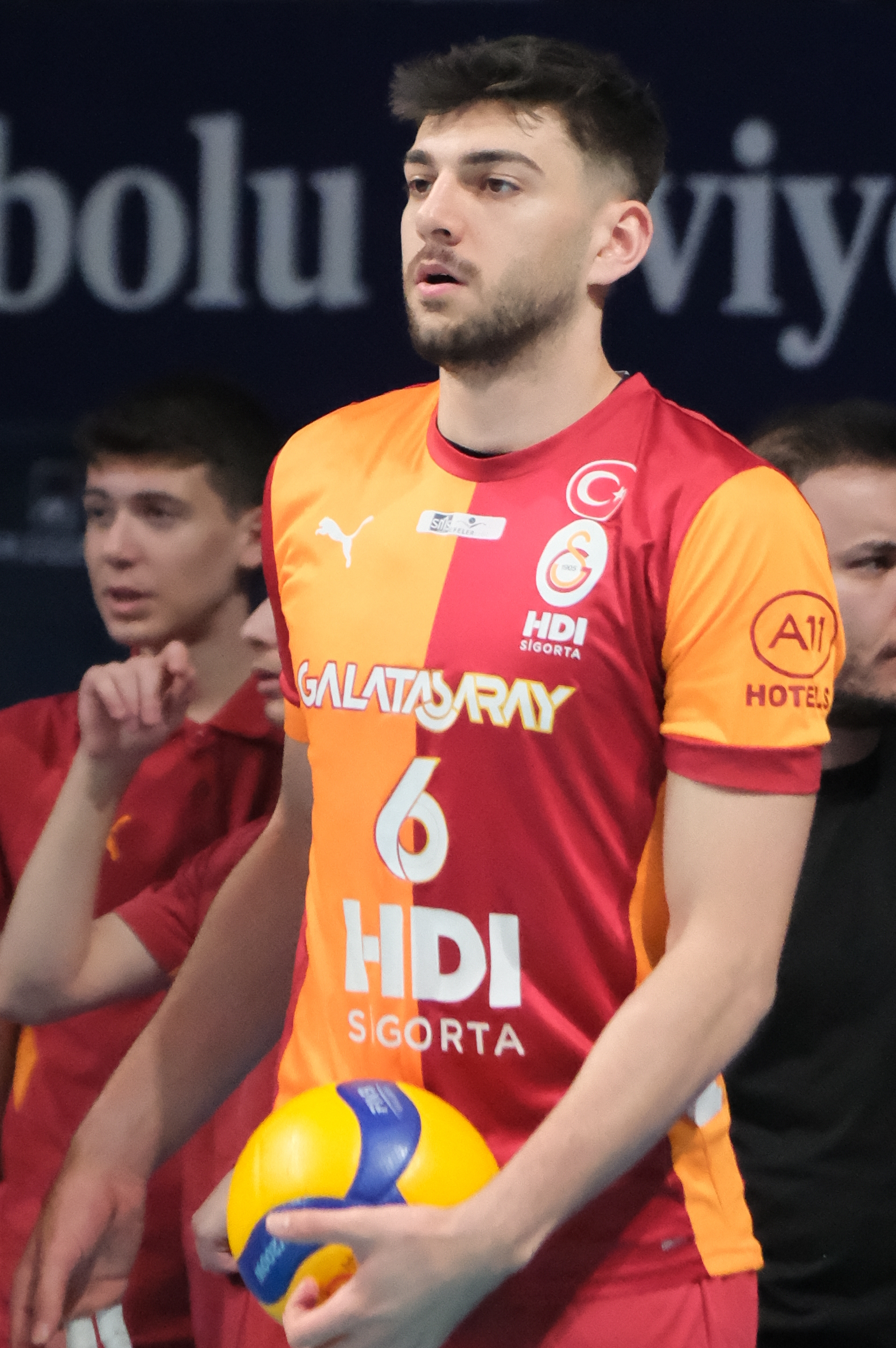

Personal information
- Full name: Gökçen Yüksel
- Born: 11 July 2004 (age 22) Turkey
- Height: 2.04 m (6 ft 8 in)
- Weight: 89 kg (196 lb)
- Spike: 340 cm (134 in)
- Block: 315 cm (124 in)

Volleyball information
- Position: Outside Hitter
- Current club: Galatasaray HDI Sigorta
- Number: 6

Career
- Years: Team
- 2020–2025; 2021–2022; 2022–2025; 2025–: İzmir Saint Joseph; Arkas Spor II; Arkas Spor; Galatasaray HDI Sigorta

National team
- Years: Team
- –: Turkey

Gökçen Yüksel (born 11 July 2004) is a Turkish volleyball player who plays as an outside hitter.

== Club career ==
He signed a two–year contract with Galatasaray HDI Sigorta on July 4, 2025.

He signed a new 3-year contract with Galatasaray on November 2, 2026.
