= Hasan Yeşilbudak =

Turkish volleyball player (born 1984)

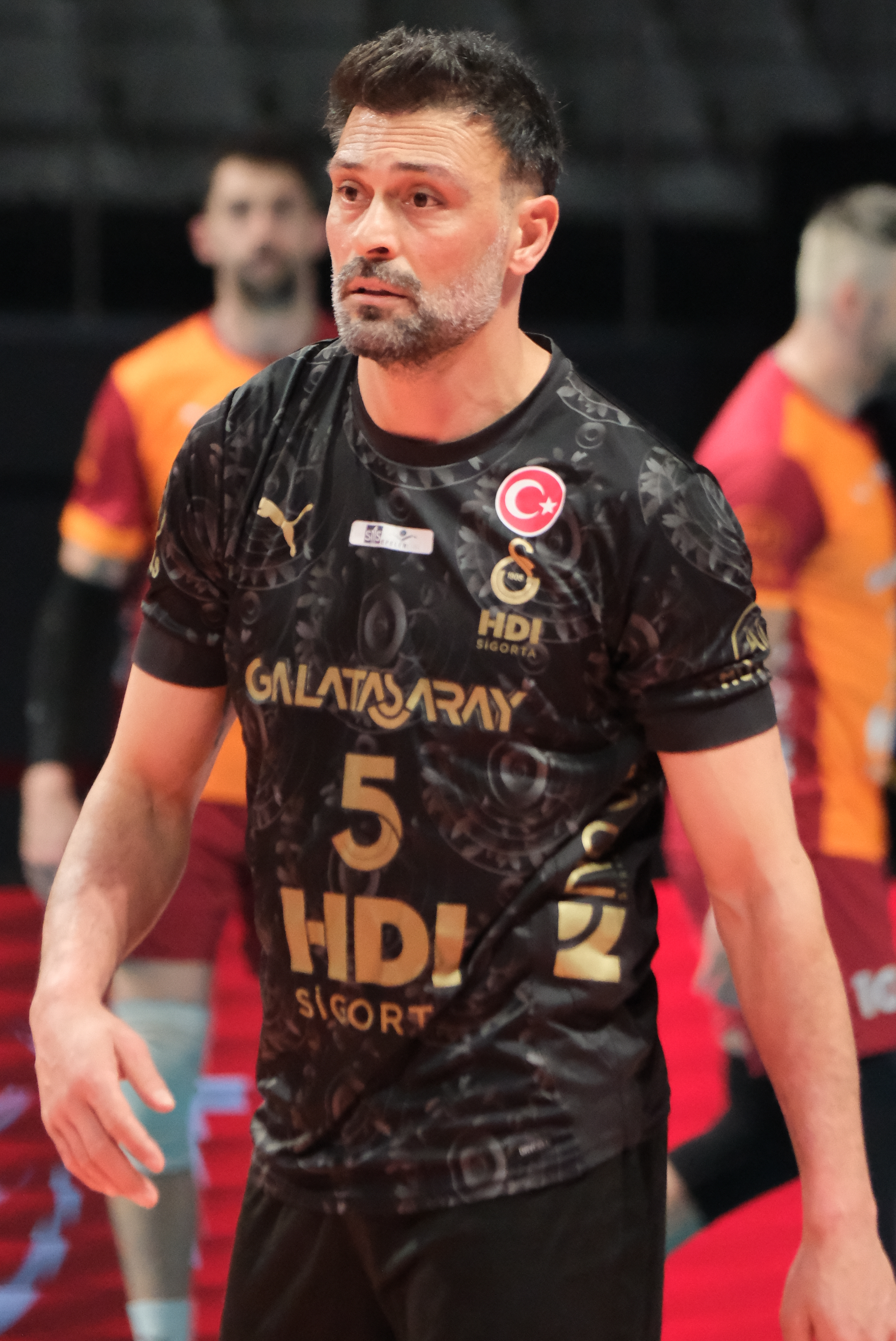

Personal information
- Nationality: Turkish
- Born: 11 January 1984 (age 42)
- Height: 1.90 m (6 ft 3 in)
- Weight: 83 kg (183 lb)
- Spike: 342 cm (135 in)
- Block: 329 cm (130 in)

Volleyball information
- Position: Libero

Career
Years	Teams
2002–2007; 2007–2012; 2012–2015; 2015–2020; 2020–2024; 2024–2026	Arçelik; Halkbank Ankara; Arkas Spor; Halkbank Ankara; Fenerbahçe; Galatasaray

National team
2014–	Turkey

Hasan Yeşilbudak (born 11 January 1984) is a Turkish male volleyball player. He is part of the Turkey men's national volleyball team. On club level he played for Galatasaray.

== Club career ==
9 July 2024, signed a 2-year contract with Galatasaray.

== Sporting achievements ==
=== Clubs ===
==== National championships ====
- 2015/2016 Turkish SuperCup 2015, with Halkbank Ankara
- 2015/2016 Turkish Championship, with Halkbank Ankara
