= Ahmet Tümer =

Turkish volleyball player (born 2001)

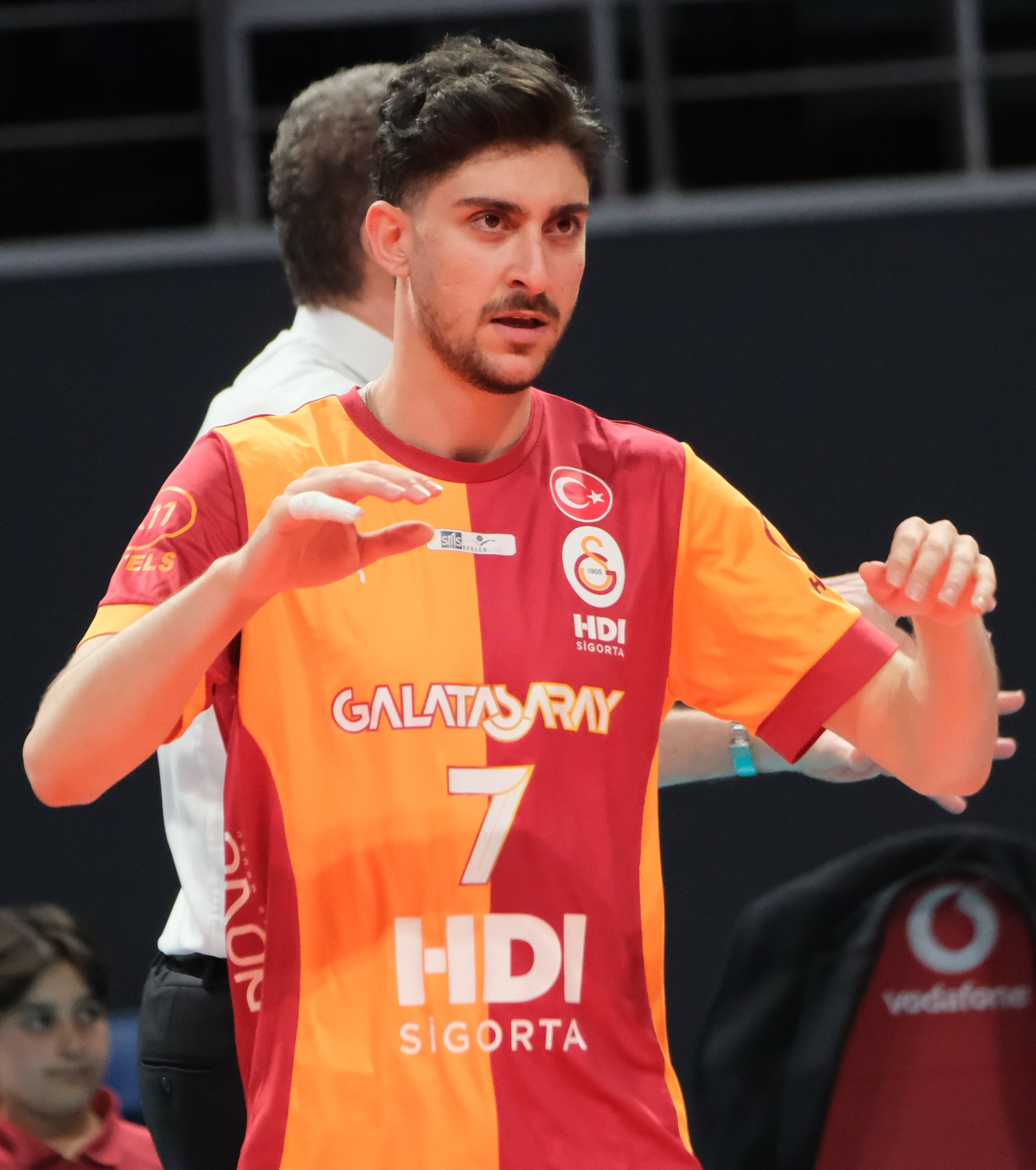

Personal information
- Full name: Ahmet Tümer
- Born: 15 September 2001 (age 25); Hatay, Turkey
- Height: 2.03 m (6 ft 8 in)
- Weight: 90 kg (198 lb)
- Spike: 375 cm (148 in)
- Block: 340 cm (134 in)

Volleyball information
- Position: Middle-blocker
- Current club: Ziraat Bankası

Career
Years
- 2016–2019
- 2019–2020
- 2020
- 2021
- 2021–2023
- 2023–2026
- 2026–
Teams
- Beşiktaş
- Spor Toto Spor Kulübü
- Altekma SK
- Rams global Cizre Belediyespor
- Fenerbahçe HDI Sigorta
- Galatasaray HDI Sigorta
- Ziraat Bankası

National team
Turkey
Honours
Men's volleyball
Representing Turkey
Islamic Solidarity Games
Bronze medal – third place	2021 Konya	Team

Ahmet Tümer (born 15 September 2001) is a Turkish volleyball player who plays as a middle blocker.

== Club career ==
On 14 June 2023, he signed a new 2-year contract with Galatasaray HDI Sigorta.
