= Necdet Turhan =

Turkish disabled mountaineer and national athlete

Personal information
- Nationality: Turkish
- Born: 1957 (age 68–69) Balıkesir, Turkey

Climbing career
- Major ascents: Mt. Ararat 5,137 m (16,854 ft), Mt. Kilimanjaro 5,895 m (19,341 ft), Mont Blanc, Europe 4,808 m (15,774 ft); Mt. Sherman 4,280 m (14,040 ft); Mt. Kosciuszko 2,228 m (7,310 ft)

Necdet Turhan (born 1957) is a Turkish visually impaired mountaineer and national athlete for long-distance running. In 2017 he completed a project that called for running five marathons on five different continents, and climbing five summits in five different continents.

== Early life ==
Necdet Turhan was born in Balıkesir, Turkey, in 1957. He was schooled in Bursa due to his father's professional assignment. He lost his eyesight due to a corneal disease which began when he was 23. After finishing high school, he studied political science and public administration at the Middle East Technical University in Ankara. He graduated with honours in 1994.

== Career ==
Turhan started mountaineering by joining the "Mountain Climbing and Winter Sports Club" at his university. He initially faced objection from the club members due to his blindness, but afterwards was allowed to take part in climbing activities. He reached the summits of Bey Dağları, Mt. Erciyes, and other peaks in Turkey. He became interested in long-distance running after he met master athletes exercising at the Bursa Atatürk Stadium. In 2000, he took part in the Istanbul Marathon, running in the 15 km (9.3 mi) category.

As part of a project titled "Five marathons, five summits in five continents", which was sponsored by the "Bridge to Turkey Fund" of the Turkish people living in the U.S., Turhan ran the New York City Marathon (Americas) in 2002, the Athens Classic Marathon (Europe) in 2004, the Japan World Blind Marathon (Asia) in 2005, the Sydney Marathon (Australasia) in 2006, and the Egyptian Luxor Marathon (Africa) in 2007. He climbed the 5,137 m-high (16,854 ft) Mt. Ararat (Asia) in 2007, the 5,895 m-high (19,341 ft) Mt. Kilimanjaro (Africa) in 2008, the 4,808 m-high (15,774 ft) Mont Blanc (Europe) in 2010, and the 4,280 m-high (14,040 ft) Mt. Sherman (Americas) in 2014. After completing five marathons and four summits, he achieved his project goal in 2017 by climbing the 2,228 m-high (7,310 ft) Mt. Kosciuszko (Australasia) as the fifth summit.

== Personal life ==
Currently, Turhan lives in Bursa.
