= Caner Ergül =

Turkish volleyball player (born 1994)

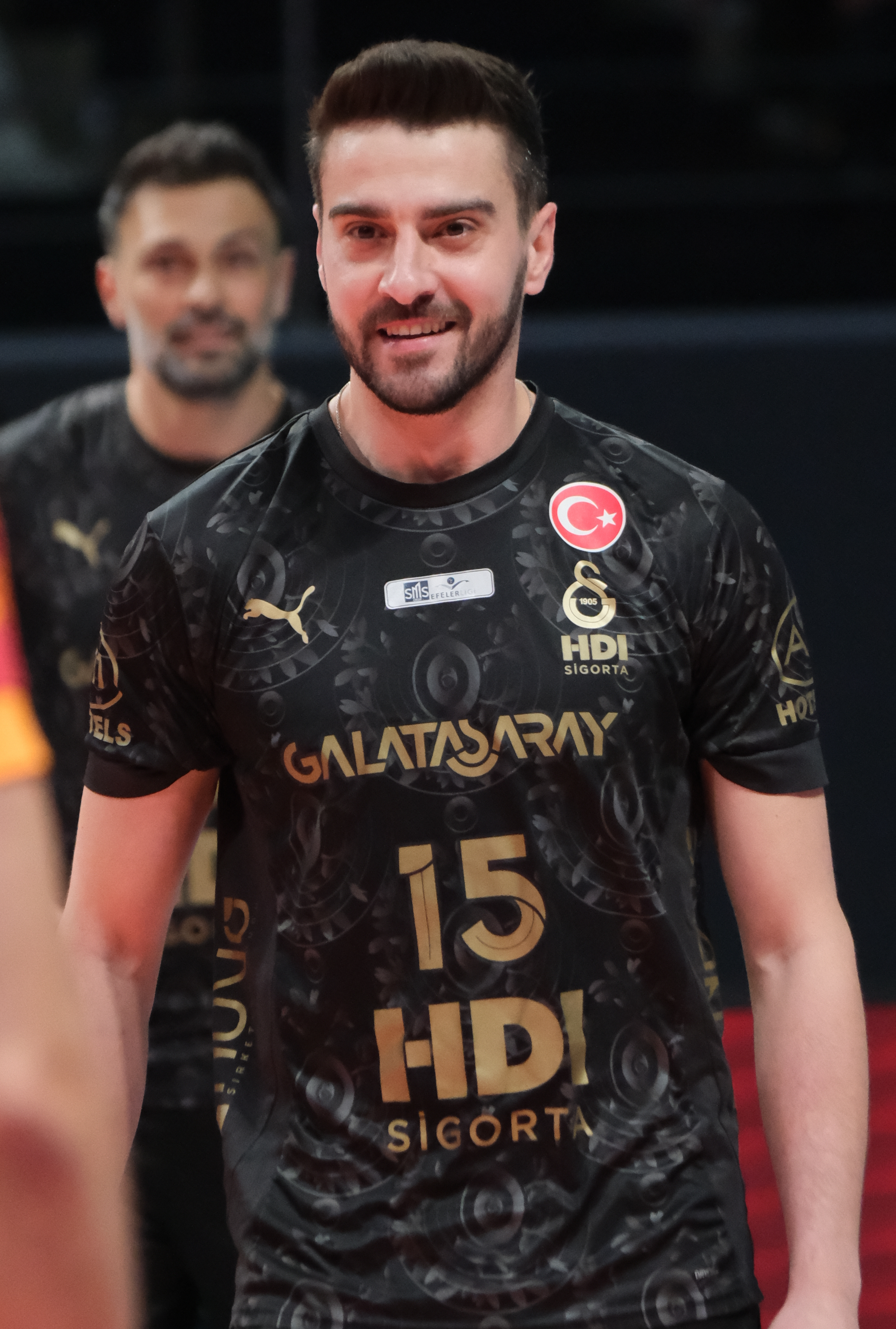

Personal information
- Full name: Caner Ergül
- Born: 31 July 1994 (age 32); Turkey
- Height: 1.87 m (6 ft 2 in)
- Weight: 74 kg (163 lb)

Volleyball information
- Position: Libero

Career
Years
- 2013–2014
- 2014–2015
- 2015–2020
- 2020–2022
- 2022–2024
- 2024–2026
Teams
- Arkas Spor
- Bal Spor
- Arkas Spor
- Halkbank
- Bursa BBSK
- Galatasaray HDI Sigorta

National team
Turkey

Caner Ergül (born 31 July 1994) is a Turkish volleyball player who plays as a Libero.

== Club career ==
On 10 July 2024, he signed a new 2–year contract with Galatasaray HDI Sigorta.
