= Oğuzhan Karasu =

Turkish volleyball player (born 1995)

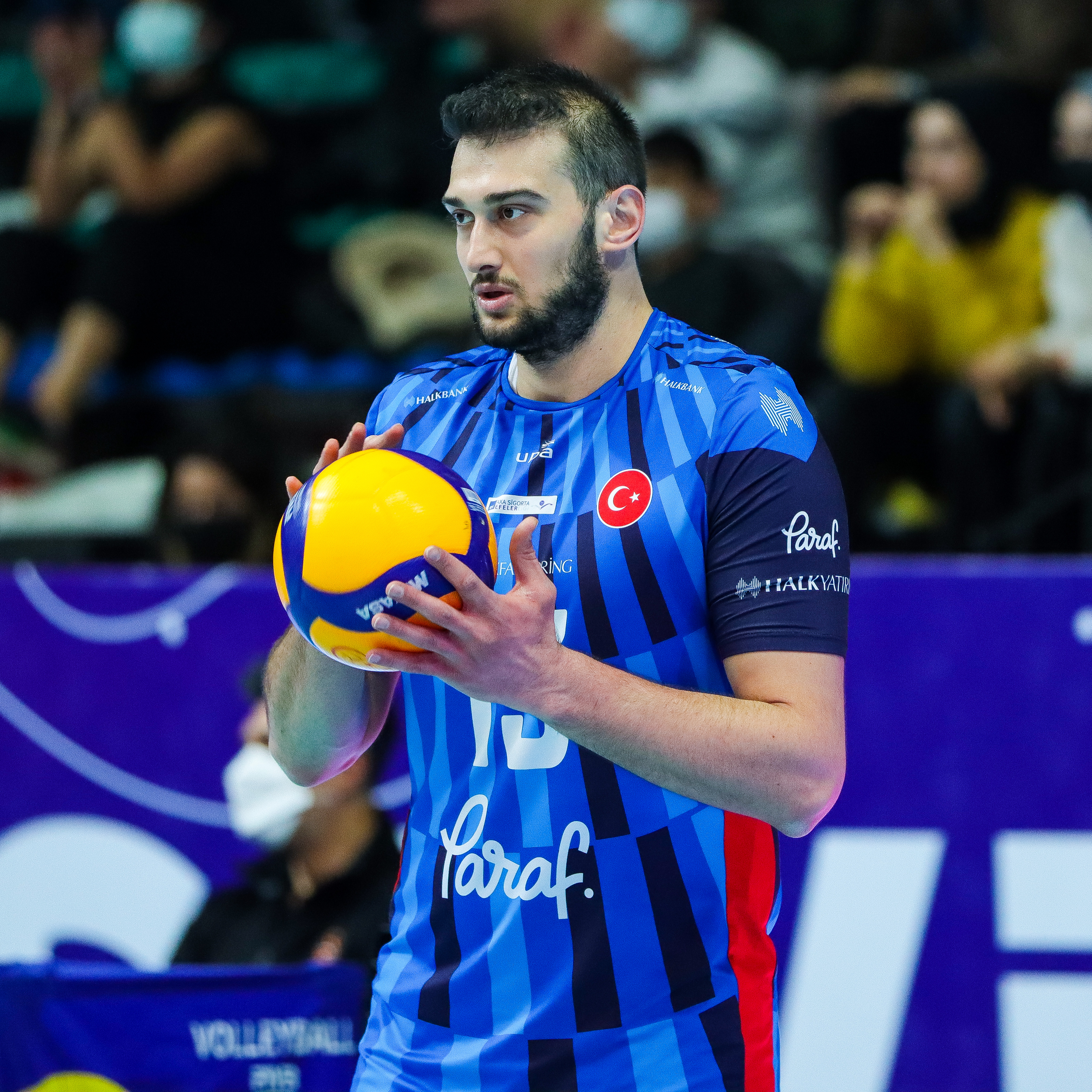

Personal information
- Full name: Oğuzhan Karasu
- Born: 16 June 1995 (age 31); Istanbul, Turkey
- Height: 2.03 m (6 ft 8 in)
- Weight: 105 kg (231 lb)
- Spike: 344 cm (135 in)
- Block: 330 cm (130 in)

Volleyball information
- Position: Middle-blocker
- Current club: Akkuş Belediyespor

Career
Years
- 2014–2019
- 2020–2022
- 2022–2025
- 2025–
Teams
- Fenerbahçe
- Halkbank
- Galatasaray
- Akkuş Belediyespor

National team
Turkey

Oğuzhan Karasu (born 16 June 1995) is a Turkish volleyball player.

== Club career ==
=== Halkbank ===
He signed a contract with Halkbank on 23 July 2020.

=== Galatasaray ===
On 25 July 2022, he signed a new 1-year contract with Galatasaray HDI Sigorta, and a one-year extension on 15 June 2023.

Galatasaray club said goodbye to the player on May 12, 2025, by publishing a thank you message.
