= Onur Günaydı =

Turkish volleyball player

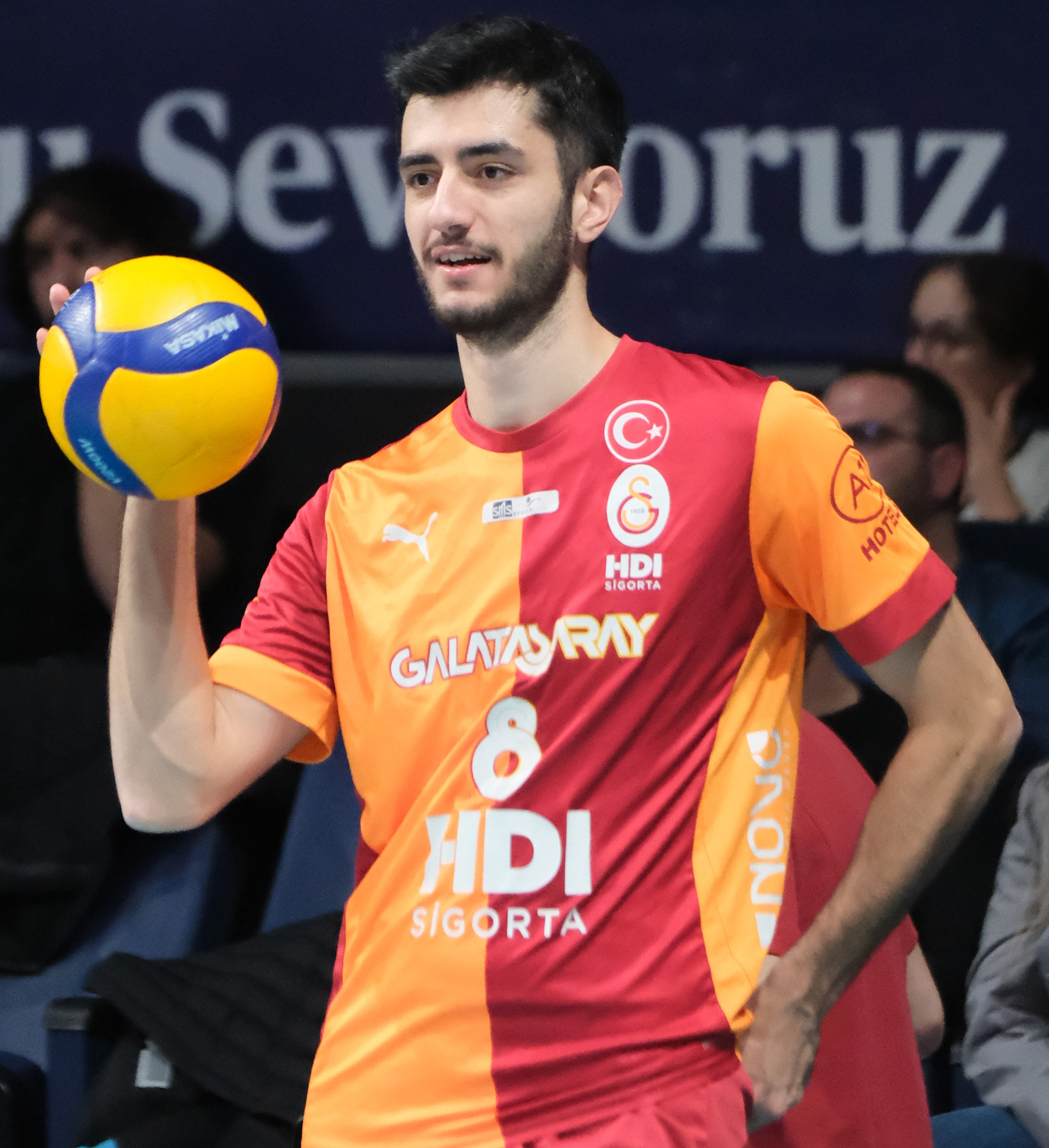

Personal information
- Full name: Onur Günaydı
- Born: 28 September 2002 (age 24); Turkey
- Height: 2.03 m (6 ft 8 in)
- Weight: 92 kg (203 lb)
- Spike: 340 cm (134 in)
- Block: 330 cm (130 in)

Volleyball information
- Position: Outside Hitter
- Current club: ON Hotels Alanya Belediyespor

Career
Years
- 2018–2019
- 2019–2021
- 2021–2025
- 2025
- 2025–2026
- 2026–
Teams
- Bal Spor
- Bigadiç Belediyespor
- Galatasaray HDI Sigorta
- → ON Hotels Alanya Belediyespor
- Galatasaray HDI Sigorta
- ON Hotels Alanya Belediyespor

National team
Turkey

Onur Günaydı (born 28 September 2002) is a Turkish volleyball player who plays as an outside hitter.

== Club career ==
He signed a 2–year contract with Galatasaray HDI Sigorta on August 11, 2022.

He signed a 1–year contract with Galatasaray on July 2, 2024.

On January 6, 2025, he signed a loan contract with ON Hotels Alanya Belediyespor until the end of the 2024–25 season.

He signed a new 1–year contract with Galatasaray on July 10, 2025.
