= Martin Atanasov =

Bulgarian volleyball player (born 1996)

Personal information
- Born: 27 September 1996 (age 30) Sofia, Bulgaria
- Height: 1.99 m (6 ft 6 in)
- Weight: 90 kg (198 lb)
- Spike: 369 cm (145 in)
- Block: 342 cm (135 in)

Volleyball information
- Position: Outside hitter
- Current club: Vero Volley Monza

Career
- Years: Team
- 2015–2017 2017–2018 2018–2020 2020–2023 2023–2024 2024–2025 2025–: Dobrudja Dobrich; VfB Friedrichshafen; Chaumont VB 52; Ziraat Bankası Ankara; Lokomotiv Novosibirsk; Galatasaray; Vero Volley Monza

National team
- Years: Team
- –: Bulgaria
Honours
Men's volleyball
Representing Bulgaria
FIVB World Championship
Silver medal – second place	2025 Philippines

Martin Atanasov (Bulgarian: Мартин Атанасов; born 27 September 1996) is a Bulgarian professional volleyball player who plays as an outside hitter for Vero Volley Monza and the Bulgaria national team.

== Club career ==
For the 2024–25 season, he signed a contract with Galatasaray.

== Honours ==
=== Club ===
- CEV Challenge Cup
  - 2020–21 – with Ziraat Bankası Ankara
- Domestic
  - 2015–16 Bulgarian Championship, with Dobrudja Dobrich
  - 2017–18 German SuperCup, with VfB Friedrichshafen
  - 2017–18 German Cup, with VfB Friedrichshafen
  - 2020–21 Turkish Championship, with Ziraat Bankası Ankara
  - 2021–22 Turkish SuperCup, with Ziraat Bankası Ankara
  - 2021–22 Turkish Championship, with Ziraat Bankası Ankara
  - 2022–23 Turkish SuperCup, with Ziraat Bankası Ankara
  - 2022–23 Turkish Championship, with Ziraat Bankası Ankara
