= Semih Çalışkan =

Turkish author

Semih Çalışkan (born 10 January 1986) is a Turkish writer.

== Biography ==
Çalışkan was born on 10 January 1986 in Istanbul. After graduating from Pertevniyal High School, he studied chemistry at Boğaziçi University. During his time at university, he attended screenwriting courses at Mithat Alam Cinema Centre for two years. He has worked for multinational advertising agencies and FMCG companies. Now, Çalışkan works as the CEO of ÇapaMarka Entertainment Group.

Çalışkan's first novel, A Bar Philosopher is a love story based on a true story. It was published in October 2015 and it became a national bestseller.

Ayşe Arman describes him as an 'author entrepreneur'. The cover of the book "A Bar Philosopher" was designed by Emrah Yucel. Moreover, for the book launch, Çalışkan produced short movies in which Gupse Özay stars. Those short movies were screened for the first time, in Okan Bayülgen's late night show Dada Dandanista.

== Bibliography ==
- A Bar Philosopher (Bir Bar Filozofu), 2015, Dogan, ISBN 978-605-09-3016-0
