= Muhafızgücü =

Turkish sports club

Muhafızgücü SK
- Full name: Muhafızgücü Spor Kulübü
- Founded: 1920 as Muhafız Alayı
- Dissolved: 1981
- Colors: Red and white

Muhafızgücü SK was a Turkish sports club based in Ankara, Turkey. The club was founded in Ankara following the order of Mustafa Kemal Atatürk on July 18, 1920. The club was founded under the name Muhafız Alayı by first chairman Mülazım İsmail Hakkı Bey. On 1 June 1923, the club's name was changed into Muhafızgücü. Muhafızgücü was active in football, basketball, athletics, equestrianism, cycling, polo, and volleyball. Winning the Turkish Football Championship in 1927 and the Basketball Super League in the 1973–74 season can be regarded as their biggest achievement.

Since Muhafızgücü was a military club their colors were red and white, the colors of the Turkish flag. The club was dissolved in 1981.

== Honours ==
Muhafızgücü is one of three sports clubs in Turkey who have won national championships in football, basketball, and volleyball.

=== Football ===
- Turkish Football Championship

Winners (1): 1927

- Ankara Football League

Winners (5): 1924-25, 1925-26, 1926-27, 1927-28, 1928-29
Runners-up (6): 1924, 1932–33, 1934–35, 1937–38, 1939–40, 1945–46

=== Basketball ===
- Turkish Basketball League

Winners (1): 1973–74

- Turkish Basketball Cup

Runners-up (2): 1966–67, 1967–68

=== Volleyball ===
- Turkish Volleyball League

Winners (1): 1974–75

- Turkish Volleyball Championship

Winners (2): 1968, 1969
Runners-up (2): 1965, 1967
