= Metin =

Metin is a Turkish given name and a surname that means solid and durable; derived from the Arabic word "metîn" (متين). It is one of the 99 names of Allah.

Notable people with the name include:

== Given name ==
- Metin Akan (born 1983), Turkish professional footballer
- Metin Akpınar (born 1941), Turkish actor
- Metin Aktaş (born 1977), Turkish footballer
- Metin Aslan (born 1978), Austrian footballer
- Metin Ataseven (born 1972), Swedish politician
- Metin Lütfi Baydar (born 1960), Turkish medical scientist
- Metin Boşnak (born 1965), Turkish scholar of American Studies and Comparative Literature, and poet
- Metin Bostancıoğlu (born 1942), Turkish politician
- Cemal Metin Bulutoğluları (born 1960), Turkish Cypriot mayor of the capital of Northern Cyprus
- Metin Çelik (born 1970), Turkish-Dutch politician
- Metin Depe (born 1981), Turkey football defender
- Metin Diyadin (born 1968), Turkish football manager and retired player
- Metin Erksan (1929–2012), Turkish film director and art historian
- Metin Ersoy (1934–2017), Turkish singer
- Metin Günay (born 1963), Turkish director
- Metin Hüseyin (born 1959), British television and film director
- Metin Kaçan (1961–2013), Turkish author and novelist
- Metin Kaplan (born 1952), the leader of the radical Islamist movement Kalifatsstaat based in Cologne, Germany
- Metin Kaya (born 1961), Turkish-born German politician
- Metin Kurt (1948–2012), Turkish footballer
- Metin Oktay (1936–1991), Turkish footballer
- Metin Serezli (1934–2013), Turkish actor
- Metin Sitti (born 1970), Turkish roboticist and university professor
- Metin Tekin (born 1964), Turkish professional football player
- Metin Toker (1924–2002), Turkish journalist and writer
- Metin Türel (1935–2018), Turkish football coach
- Metin Yenal, German actor active in the United Kingdom
- Metin Yüksel (1958–1979), Kurdish Islamist from Turkey
- Metin Yurdanur (born 1951), Turkish sculptor

== Surname ==
- Tümer Metin (born 1974), Turkish international footballer
