= Galatasaray S.K. (men's volleyball) =

Turkish men's volleyball team

Galatasaray SK
- 2026–27 season
- Full name: Galatasaray
- Short name: Galatasaray
- Founded: 1922
- Ground: TVF Burhan Felek Sport Hall (Capacity: 7,000)
- Chairman: Dursun Özbek
- Manager: Andrea Gardini
- Captain: Arslan Ekşi
- League: Efeler Ligi
- 2025–26: Regular season: 3rd Play-offs: 2nd
- Championships: 16 Turkish Championships

Galatasaray is the men's volleyball section of Galatasaray SK, a major sports club in Istanbul, Turkey. Galatasaray play their matches in the 7000-seat arena TVF Burhan Felek Sport Hall.

== Previous names ==
Period	Previous names
1922–2011	Galatasaray
2011–2012	Galatasaray Yurtiçi Kargo
2012–2013	Galatasaray
2013–2015	Galatasaray FXTCR
2015–2026	Galatasaray HDI Sigorta
2026	Galatasaray
2026–present	Galatasaray Madeş Mobilya

== Honours ==
Galatasaray S.K.
Medal record

Men's volleyball

Representing Galatasaray SK

Istanbul Volleyball League
Bronze medal – third place	Istanbul Volleyball League	1928
Bronze medal – third place	Istanbul Volleyball League	1929
Gold medal – first place	Istanbul Volleyball League	1932
Gold medal – first place	Istanbul Volleyball League	1935
Silver medal – second place	Istanbul Volleyball League	1936
Gold medal – first place	Istanbul Volleyball League	1941
Silver medal – second place	Istanbul Volleyball League	1942
Silver medal – second place	Istanbul Volleyball League	1943
Gold medal – first place	Istanbul Volleyball League	1944
Gold medal – first place	Istanbul Volleyball League	1945
Bronze medal – third place	Istanbul Volleyball League	1946
Gold medal – first place	Istanbul Volleyball League	1950
Silver medal – second place	Istanbul Volleyball League	1951
Silver medal – second place	Istanbul Volleyball League	1952
Gold medal – first place	Istanbul Volleyball League	1954
Gold medal – first place	Istanbul Volleyball League	1955
Gold medal – first place	Istanbul Volleyball League	1956
Gold medal – first place	Istanbul Volleyball League	1957
Silver medal – second place	Istanbul Volleyball League	1958
Gold medal – first place	Istanbul Volleyball League	1959
Gold medal – first place	Istanbul Volleyball League	1960
Gold medal – first place	Istanbul Volleyball League	1961
Gold medal – first place	Istanbul Volleyball League	1962
Gold medal – first place	Istanbul Volleyball League	1963
Gold medal – first place	Istanbul Volleyball League	1964
Gold medal – first place	Istanbul Volleyball League	1965
Gold medal – first place	Istanbul Volleyball League	1966
Silver medal – second place	Istanbul Volleyball League	1967
Silver medal – second place	Istanbul Volleyball League	1968
Silver medal – second place	Istanbul Volleyball League	1969
Silver medal – second place	Istanbul Volleyball League	1970

Turkish Men's Volleyball Championship
Silver medal – second place	TV Championship	1950
Silver medal – second place	TV Championship	1952
Silver medal – second place	TV Championship	1953
Gold medal – first place	TV Championship	1955
Gold medal – first place	TV Championship	1956
Gold medal – first place	TV Championship	1957
Gold medal – first place	TV Championship	1958
Bronze medal – third place	TV Championship	1959
Gold medal – first place	TV Championship	1960
Gold medal – first place	TV Championship	1961
Gold medal – first place	TV Championship	1962
Gold medal – first place	TV Championship	1963
Gold medal – first place	TV Championship	1964
Gold medal – first place	TV Championship	1965
Gold medal – first place	TV Championship	1966
Gold medal – first place	TV Championship	1967
Bronze medal – third place	TV Championship	1969

Turkish Men's Volleyball League
Gold medal – first place	TVL League	1971
Bronze medal – third place	TVL League	1972
Gold medal – first place	TVL League	1987
Gold medal – first place	TVL League	1988
Gold medal – first place	TVL League	1989
Bronze medal – third place	TVL League	1994

=== Domestic competitions ===
- Turkish Men's Volleyball League

Winners (4): 1970-1971, 1986-1987, 1987-1988, 1988-1989
Runners-up (4): 1990-91, 1992-93, 2024-25, 2025-26
Third place (6): 1971-72, 1983-84, 1985-86, 1993-94, 2000-01, 2018-19

- Turkish Men's Volleyball Championship:

Winners (12) (record): 1955, 1956, 1957, 1958, 1960, 1961, 1962, 1963, 1964, 1965, 1966, 1967
Runners-up (3): 1950, 1952, 1953
Third place (2): 1959, 1969

- Istanbul Men's Volleyball League:

Winners (16) (record): 1931-32, 1934-35, 1943-44, 1944-45, 1952-53, 1954-55, 1955-56, 1956-57, 1958-59, 1959-60, 1960-61, 1961-62, 1962-63, 1963-64, 1964-65, 1965-66
Runners-up (10): 1935-36, 1940-41, 1941-42, 1942-43, 1948-49, 1950-51, 1951-52, 1957-58, 1966-67, 1967-68, 1968-69, 1969-70
Third place (3): 1927-28, 1928-29, 1945-46

- Turkish Men's Volleyball Cup

Runners-up (6): 1998-99, 2009-10, 2011-12, 2018-19, 2021-22, 2025-26

- Turkish Men's Volleyball Super Cup

Winners (2): 2018-19, 2026-27
Runners-up (2): 1988-89, 2011-12

=== European competitions ===
- Balkan Cup

Winners (1): 2016

- CEV Cup

Runners-up (1): 2018–19

- CEV Challenge Cup

4th place (1): 1991–92

== Technical staff ==
As of 31 August 2026

Name	Job
(Turkey) Neslihan Turan	Administrative Manager of Volleyball Teams
(Turkey) Beril Kefeli	Assistant Administrative Manager
(Turkey) Mehmetcan Şamlı	Men's Volleyball Team Manager
(Italy) Andrea Gardini	Head Coach
(Turkey) Cihan Çintay	Assistant Coach
(Turkey) Selçuk Keskin	Assistant Coach
(Turkey) Furkan Kasap	Assistant Coach
(Turkey) Mertcan Kır	Statistics Coach
(Italy) Francesco Garrera	Conditioner
(Turkey) Yalçın Ayhan	Physiotherapist
(Turkey) Emre Yanık	Physiotherapist
(Turkey) Ali Tufan	Outfitter
(Turkey) Defne Heybeli	Corporate Communications and Media Officer

== Team roster ==
As of 16 August 2026

No.	Player	Position	Date of Birth	Height (m)	Country
4	Abdulsamet Yalçın	Libero	25 January 2000 (age 26)	1.90	Turkey
6	Gökçen Yüksel	Outside Hitter	11 July 2004 (age 22)	2.04	Turkey
7	Yiğit Savaş Kaplan	Middle-blocker	10 January 2004 (age 22)	2.07	Turkey
9	Jean Patry	Opposite	27 December 1996 (age 29)	2.07	France
10	Arslan Ekşi (c)	Setter	17 July 1985 (age 41)	1.96	Turkey
11	Micah Maʻa	Setter	16 April 1997 (age 29)	1.92	United States
13	Stephen Maar	Outside Hitter	6 December 1994 (age 31)	1.99	Canada
14	Faik Samet Güneş	Middle-blocker	27 May 1993 (age 33)	2.03	Turkey
15	Cafer Kirkit	Outside Hitter	1 January 2001 (age 25)	1.93	Turkey
16	Emirhan Özçelik	Outside Hitter	26 June 2006 (age 20)	2.01	Turkey
17	Doğukan Ulu	Middle-blocker	30 October 1995 (age 30)	2.05	Turkey
19	Özgür Benzer	Setter	1 February 2005 (age 21)	1.97	Turkey
21	Roamy Alonso	Middle-blocker	24 July 1997 (age 29)	2.03	Cuba
31	Emir Pınar	Middle-blocker	20 August 2001 (age 25)	1.97	Turkey
37	Fatih Yörümez	Libero	11 March 2000 (age 26)	1.83	Turkey
77	Can Koç	Opposite	29 April 2003 (age 23)	2.00	Turkey
99	Ramazan Efe Mandıracı	Outside Hitter	1 April 2002 (age 24)	2.03	Turkey

== Former coaches ==
Dates	Name
1961–1967	(Turkey) Oral Yılmaz
1970–1971	(Turkey) Oral Yılmaz
1979–1992	(Turkey) Enver Göçener
1996–2002	(Turkey) Gökhan Yılmaz
1999–2001	(Cuba) Jesús Savigne
2002–2006	(Turkey) Işık Menküer
2006–2009	(Turkey) Ali Ümit Hızal
2009–2012	(Turkey) Işık Menküer
2012–2013	(Serbia) Dragan Nešić
2013–2014	(Turkey) Ahmet Reşat Arığ
2014–2015	(Italy) Flavio Gulinelli
2015–2022	(Turkey) Nedim Özbey
2022–2025	(Turkey) Umut Çakır
2025–present	(Italy) Andrea Gardini

== Team captains ==
This is a list of the senior team's captains in recent years.

Period	Captain
2018–2021	(Turkey) Selçuk Keskin
2021–2022	(Turkey) Burutay Subaşı
2022	(Puerto Rico) Maurice Torres
2022–2023	(Turkey) Selçuk Keskin
2023–2024	(Turkey) Baturalp Burak Güngör
2024–present	(Turkey) Arslan Ekşi

== See also ==
- Galatasaray S.K. (women's volleyball)
- Turkey men's national volleyball team
