= 2019 FIVB Men's Volleyball Challenger Cup squads =

This article shows the rosters of all participating teams at the 2019 FIVB Men's Volleyball Challenger Cup in Slovenia.

== Pool A ==
=== Chile ===
The following is the Chilean roster in the 2019 FIVB Men's Volleyball Challenger Cup.

Head coach: Daniel Nejamkin

No.	Name	Date of birth	Height	Weight	Spike	Block	2019 club
1	Simon Guerra Uteau	19 January 1996	2 m (6 ft 7 in)	87 kg (192 lb)	350 cm (140 in)	330 cm (130 in)	(Chile) Castelo de Maia
2	Vicente Ibarra	14 May 2001	2.02 m (6 ft 8 in)	90 kg (200 lb)	335 cm (132 in)	320 cm (130 in)	Selección Chile
3	Gabriel Araya	6 November 1995	1.97 m (6 ft 6 in)	90 kg (200 lb)	345 cm (136 in)	310 cm (120 in)	(Chile) Deportivo Linares
4	Tomas Parraguirre	1 March 1991	1.97 m (6 ft 6 in)	104 kg (229 lb)	335 cm (132 in)	315 cm (124 in)	(Chile) St Thomas Morus
5	Matias Parraguirre	2 July 1987	1.91 m (6 ft 3 in)	99 kg (218 lb)	326 cm (128 in)	312 cm (123 in)	(Chile) St. Thomas Morus
7	Rafael Albornoz Refusta	12 November 1996	1.91 m (6 ft 3 in)	80 kg (180 lb)	330 cm (130 in)	315 cm (124 in)	(Chile) Atletico Paracao
9	Dusan Bonacic (c)	19 July 1995	1.96 m (6 ft 5 in)	93 kg (205 lb)	351 cm (138 in)	326 cm (128 in)	(Chile) Gigantes del Sur
10	Vicente Mardones	18 December 1999	2.07 m (6 ft 9 in)	80 kg (180 lb)	340 cm (130 in)	328 cm (129 in)	(Chile) Stadio Italiano
11	Vicente Parraguirre	14 October 1994	1.94 m (6 ft 4 in)	91 kg (201 lb)	341 cm (134 in)	315 cm (124 in)	Selección Chile
13	Lucas Lavin	15 May 2000	1.87 m (6 ft 2 in)	74 kg (163 lb)	310 cm (120 in)	290 cm (110 in)	(Chile) Stadio Italiano
14	Esteban Villarreal Soltau	1 August 1997	1.93 m (6 ft 4 in)	83 kg (183 lb)	325 cm (128 in)	305 cm (120 in)	(Chile) Río Duero Voley
15	Sebastian Castillo	19 November 1995	1.78 m (5 ft 10 in)	73 kg (161 lb)	318 cm (125 in)	305 cm (120 in)	Selección Chile
16	Tomas Gago Murtagh	11 June 1997	1.98 m (6 ft 6 in)	85 kg (187 lb)	337 cm (133 in)	319 cm (126 in)	Selección Chile
19	Matias Banda	5 September 1995	1.9 m (6 ft 3 in)	83 kg (183 lb)	325 cm (128 in)	310 cm (120 in)	(Chile) Deportivo Linares

=== Slovenia ===
The following is the Slovenian roster in the 2019 FIVB Men's Volleyball Challenger Cup.

Head coach: Alberto Giuliani

No.	Name	Date of birth	Height	Weight	Spike	Block	2019 club
1	Tonček Štern	14 November 1995	1.98 m (6 ft 6 in)	95 kg (209 lb)	352 cm (139 in)	340 cm (130 in)	(Italy) Latina
2	Alen Pajenk	23 April 1986	2.03 m (6 ft 8 in)	92 kg (203 lb)	366 cm (144 in)	336 cm (132 in)	(Poland) WKS Czarni Radom
4	Jan Kozamernik	24 December 1995	2.04 m (6 ft 8 in)	103 kg (227 lb)	360 cm (140 in)	340 cm (130 in)	(Italy) Revivre Axopower Milano
5	Alen Šket	28 March 1988	2.05 m (6 ft 9 in)	92 kg (203 lb)	350 cm (140 in)	336 cm (132 in)	(Turkey) Halkbank
6	Mitja Gasparini	26 June 1984	2.02 m (6 ft 8 in)	93 kg (205 lb)	346 cm (136 in)	333 cm (131 in)	(Japan) Toyoda Gosei
9	Dejan Vinčić	15 September 1986	2 m (6 ft 7 in)	93 kg (205 lb)	354 cm (139 in)	338 cm (133 in)	(Poland) WKS Czarni Radom
10	Sašo Štalekar	3 May 1996	2.14 m (7 ft 0 in)	98 kg (216 lb)	354 cm (139 in)	340 cm (130 in)	(Slovenia) CALCIT VOLLEYBALL
11	Žiga Štern	2 January 1994	1.93 m (6 ft 4 in)	88 kg (194 lb)	346 cm (136 in)	330 cm (130 in)	(Italy) Latina
13	Jani Kovačič	14 June 1992	1.86 m (6 ft 1 in)	83 kg (183 lb)	320 cm (130 in)	305 cm (120 in)	(Italy) RAVENNA
14	Urban Toman	21 October 1997	1.85 m (6 ft 1 in)	82 kg (181 lb)	310 cm (120 in)	295 cm (116 in)	(Germany) United Volleys
15	Matic Videčnik	31 July 1993	2.03 m (6 ft 8 in)	98 kg (216 lb)	347 cm (137 in)	329 cm (130 in)	(Slovenia) ACH Volley
16	Gregor Ropret	1 March 1989	1.92 m (6 ft 4 in)	89 kg (196 lb)	343 cm (135 in)	325 cm (128 in)	(France) NANTES
17	Tine Urnaut (c)	3 September 1988	2 m (6 ft 7 in)	88 kg (194 lb)	365 cm (144 in)	332 cm (131 in)	(China) SHANGHAI
18	Klemen Čebulj	21 February 1992	2.02 m (6 ft 8 in)	96 kg (212 lb)	366 cm (144 in)	345 cm (136 in)	(Italy) Itas Trentino

=== Turkey ===
The following is the Turkish roster in the 2019 FIVB Men's Volleyball Challenger Cup.

Head coach: Nedim Özbey

No.	Name	Date of birth	Height	Weight	Spike	Block	2019 club
6	İzzet Ünver	1 January 1992	1.95 m (6 ft 5 in)	87 kg (192 lb)	332 cm (131 in)	319 cm (126 in)	(Turkey) Fenerbahce
8	Burutay Subasi	15 July 1990	1.94 m (6 ft 4 in)	99 kg (218 lb)	352 cm (139 in)	339 cm (133 in)	(Turkey) HALKBANK
9	Yasin Aydin	11 July 1995	1.95 m (6 ft 5 in)	82 kg (181 lb)	335 cm (132 in)	320 cm (130 in)	(Turkey) GALATASARAY
10	Arslan Eksi (c)	17 July 1985	1.96 m (6 ft 5 in)	92 kg (203 lb)	325 cm (128 in)	315 cm (124 in)	(Turkey) HALKBANK
11	Yigit Gulmezoglu	28 December 1995	1.96 m (6 ft 5 in)	87 kg (192 lb)	335 cm (132 in)	320 cm (130 in)	(Turkey) ARKAS
12	Adis Lagumdzija	29 March 1999	2.11 m (6 ft 11 in)	108 kg (238 lb)	360 cm (140 in)	340 cm (130 in)	(Turkey) ARKAS
13	Oguzhan Karasu	16 June 1995	2.05 m (6 ft 9 in)	104 kg (229 lb)	340 cm (130 in)	325 cm (128 in)	(Turkey) Fenerbahce
14	Halil Ibrahim Kurt	16 February 1998	2.05 m (6 ft 9 in)	95 kg (209 lb)	335 cm (132 in)	320 cm (130 in)	(Turkey) Fenerbahce
15	Metin Toy	3 May 1994	2.03 m (6 ft 8 in)	104 kg (229 lb)	345 cm (136 in)	330 cm (130 in)	(Turkey) İ.B.B.
16	Burak Mert	23 October 1990	1.85 m (6 ft 1 in)	81 kg (179 lb)	315 cm (124 in)	295 cm (116 in)	(Turkey) ARKAS
17	Dogukan Ulu	30 October 1995	2.05 m (6 ft 9 in)	94 kg (207 lb)	350 cm (140 in)	335 cm (132 in)	(Turkey) Galatasaray
18	Ertuğrul Gazi Metin	1 January 1996	2.04 m (6 ft 8 in)	86 kg (190 lb)	345 cm (136 in)	330 cm (130 in)	(Turkey) GALATASARAY
19	Ogulcan Yatgin	28 April 1997	2.02 m (6 ft 8 in)	91 kg (201 lb)	345 cm (136 in)	330 cm (130 in)	(Turkey) Fenerbahce
21	Volkan Done	19 February 1987	1.86 m (6 ft 1 in)	80 kg (180 lb)	305 cm (120 in)	290 cm (110 in)	(Turkey) HALKBANK

== Pool B ==
=== Belarus ===
The following is the Belarusian roster in the 2019 Men's Volleyball Challenger Cup.

Head coach: Viktar Beksha

No.	Name	Date of birth	Height	Weight	Spike	Block	2019 club
1	Andrei Radziuk	23 March 1990	1.91 m (6 ft 3 in)	84 kg (185 lb)	340 cm (130 in)	330 cm (130 in)	(Belarus) New Real Volley Gioia ASD GIOI
5	Siarhei Busel (c)	30 May 1989	2.07 m (6 ft 9 in)	88 kg (194 lb)	345 cm (136 in)	330 cm (130 in)	(Russia) Nova NOVOKUYBYSHEVSK
6	Uladzislau Babkevich	10 May 2001	2.06 m (6 ft 9 in)	82 kg (181 lb)	355 cm (140 in)	325 cm (128 in)	(Belarus) Shakhtior SOLIGORSK
7	Maksim Shkredau	10 October 1997	2.05 m (6 ft 9 in)	92 kg (203 lb)	350 cm (140 in)	340 cm (130 in)	(Belarus) Shakhtior SOLIGORSK
8	Viachaslau Shmat	6 January 1997	2.02 m (6 ft 8 in)	92 kg (203 lb)	360 cm (140 in)	335 cm (132 in)	(Belarus) Shakhtior SOLIGORSK
10	Artsiom Kudrashou	12 November 1995	2.02 m (6 ft 8 in)	93 kg (205 lb)	350 cm (140 in)	325 cm (128 in)	(Belarus) Stroitel MINSK
15	Kanstantsin Tsiushkevich	8 February 1999	1.9 m (6 ft 3 in)	72 kg (159 lb)	330 cm (130 in)	310 cm (120 in)	(Belarus) Stroitel MINSK
16	Dzmitry Vash	23 April 1988	1.93 m (6 ft 4 in)	82 kg (181 lb)	338 cm (133 in)	315 cm (124 in)	(Belarus) Energia GOMEL
17	Radzivon Miskevich	22 April 1995	1.98 m (6 ft 6 in)	85 kg (187 lb)	375 cm (148 in)	350 cm (140 in)	(Russia) Ural UFA
19	Viachaslau Charapovich	8 February 1992	1.99 m (6 ft 6 in)	95 kg (209 lb)	340 cm (130 in)	325 cm (128 in)	(Belarus) Energia GOMEL
20	Pavel Kuklinski	18 December 1989	1.94 m (6 ft 4 in)	92 kg (203 lb)	347 cm (137 in)	330 cm (130 in)	(China) Tianjin Men's VC TIANJIN
61	Raman Aplevich	19 March 1986	1.85 m (6 ft 1 in)	89 kg (196 lb)	320 cm (130 in)	310 cm (120 in)	(Belarus) Energia GOMEL

=== Cuba ===
The following is the Cuban roster in the 2019 FIVB Men's Volleyball Challenger Cup.

Head coach: Nicolas Ernesto Vives Coffigny

No.	Name	Date of birth	Height	Weight	Spike	Block	2019 club
1	Jose Israel Masso Alvarez	2 December 1997	1.99 m (6 ft 6 in)	79 kg (174 lb)	349 cm (137 in)	347 cm (137 in)	(Cuba) Guantanamo
2	Osniel Lazaro Mergarejo Hernandez	18 December 1997	1.95 m (6 ft 5 in)	73 kg (161 lb)	348 cm (137 in)	327 cm (129 in)	(Cuba) Sant-Spiritus
4	Marlon Yant Herrera	23 May 2001	2.02 m (6 ft 8 in)	75 kg (165 lb)	345 cm (136 in)	320 cm (130 in)	(Cuba) Villa Clara
5	Javier Octavio Concepcion Rojas	27 December 1997	2 m (6 ft 7 in)	84 kg (185 lb)	356 cm (140 in)	350 cm (140 in)	(Cuba) La Habana
7	Yonder Roman Garcia Alvarez	26 February 1993	1.83 m (6 ft 0 in)	78 kg (172 lb)	325 cm (128 in)	320 cm (130 in)	(Cuba) Ciudad Habana
9	Livan Osoria Rodriguez (c)	5 February 1994	2.01 m (6 ft 7 in)	96 kg (212 lb)	345 cm (136 in)	325 cm (128 in)	Santiago de Cuba
11	Lyvan Taboada Diaz	4 October 1998	1.91 m (6 ft 3 in)	75 kg (165 lb)	343 cm (135 in)	327 cm (129 in)	(Cuba) La Habana
12	Jesus Herrera Jaime	4 April 1995	1.94 m (6 ft 4 in)	85 kg (187 lb)	340 cm (130 in)	336 cm (132 in)	(Cuba) Artemisa
14	Adrian Eduardo Goide Arredondo	26 June 1998	1.91 m (6 ft 3 in)	80 kg (180 lb)	344 cm (135 in)	340 cm (130 in)	(Cuba) Sancti Spiritus
15	Yohan Armando Leon Napoles	24 January 1995	2 m (6 ft 7 in)	98 kg (216 lb)	345 cm (136 in)	340 cm (130 in)	(Cuba) Camaguey
17	Roamy Raul Alonso Arce	24 July 1997	2.01 m (6 ft 7 in)	93 kg (205 lb)	350 cm (140 in)	330 cm (130 in)	(Cuba) Matanzas
18	Miguel Angel Lopez Castro	25 March 1997	1.89 m (6 ft 2 in)	75 kg (165 lb)	345 cm (136 in)	320 cm (130 in)	(Cuba) Cienfuegos

=== Egypt ===
The following is the Egyptian roster in the 2019 FIVB Men's Volleyball Challenger Cup.

Head coach: Gido Vermeulen

No.	Name	Date of birth	Height	Weight	Spike	Block	2019 club
1	Ahmed Mohamed	1 March 1989	1.93 m (6 ft 4 in)	83 kg (183 lb)	335 cm (132 in)	330 cm (130 in)	(Egypt) Al Ahly SC
2	Abdallah Abdalsalam Abdallah Bekhit	10 October 1983	2.02 m (6 ft 8 in)	85 kg (187 lb)	346 cm (136 in)	330 cm (130 in)	(Egypt) Al Ahly SC
4	Ahmed Abdelhay (c)	19 August 1984	1.97 m (6 ft 6 in)	87 kg (192 lb)	342 cm (135 in)	316 cm (124 in)	(Egypt) Al Ahly SC
5	Abdelrahman Seoudy	21 August 1997	2.07 m (6 ft 9 in)	100 kg (220 lb)	350 cm (140 in)	337 cm (133 in)	(Egypt) Al Ahly SC
7	Hisham Ewais	26 February 1995	1.96 m (6 ft 5 in)	75 kg (165 lb)	346 cm (136 in)	322 cm (127 in)	(Egypt) SMOHA
9	Rashad Atia	2 September 1986	2.01 m (6 ft 7 in)	91 kg (201 lb)	348 cm (137 in)	342 cm (135 in)	(Egypt) TALA'EA EL-GAISH SC
10	Mohamed Masoud	1 May 1994	2.11 m (6 ft 11 in)	105 kg (231 lb)	358 cm (141 in)	342 cm (135 in)	(Egypt) Al Ahly SC
11	Ahmed Afifi	30 March 1988	1.94 m (6 ft 4 in)	92 kg (203 lb)	347 cm (137 in)	342 cm (135 in)	(Egypt) Zamalek SC
12	Hossam Abdalla	16 February 1988	2.03 m (6 ft 8 in)	97 kg (214 lb)	345 cm (136 in)	338 cm (133 in)	(Egypt) Al Ahly SC
14	Omar Hassan	4 April 1991	1.91 m (6 ft 3 in)	104 kg (229 lb)	333 cm (131 in)	324 cm (128 in)	(Egypt) TALA'EA EL-GAISH SC
16	Mohamed Abdelmohsen Seliman	4 January 1995	2.08 m (6 ft 10 in)	90 kg (200 lb)	336 cm (132 in)	322 cm (127 in)	(Egypt) Zamalek SC
18	Ahmed Shafik	7 December 1994	1.9 m (6 ft 3 in)	89 kg (196 lb)	358 cm (141 in)	341 cm (134 in)	(Egypt) Al Ahly SC
19	Mostafa Mohamed Ibrahim Abdelrahman	25 January 1994	1.97 m (6 ft 6 in)	94 kg (207 lb)	353 cm (139 in)	337 cm (133 in)	(Egypt) Zamalek SC
22	Ahmed Abdelaal	8 June 1989	1.88 m (6 ft 2 in)	84 kg (185 lb)	325 cm (128 in)	312 cm (123 in)	(Egypt) TALA'EA EL-GAISH SC
