= Volleyball at the 2013 Mediterranean Games – Men's team rosters =

This article shows the rosters of all participating teams at the men's indoor volleyball tournament at the 2013 Mediterranean Games in Mersin.

== Algeria ==
No.	Name	Date of birth	Position	Club
-	Morad Sennoun		coach	
1	Ilyas Achouri	26 February 1987	libero	
2	Abderrahmen Messaoud	19 July 1987		
4	Yassine Hakmi	6 August 1982		
6	Med Amine Oumessaad	22 December 1986		
7	Ali Kerboua	17 April 1983		(United Arab Emirates) Al-Nasr SC
9	Mohamed Chikhi			(United Arab Emirates) Al-Wasl SC
10	Toufik Mahdjoubi	21 November 1986		(Qatar) Al-Sadd SC
11	Mohamed Hachemi	9 March 1983		
13	Ibrahim Laouadi			
15	Djoudi Rafik	6 April 1986	libero	
16	Cherchali Ouled			
18	Billel Soualem			

== Egypt ==
No.	Name	Date of birth	Position	Club
-	Antonio Giacobbe	12 February 1947	coach	
1	Saleh Youssef	25 July 1982	outside hitter	(Tunisia) Espérance Tunisi
2	Abdalla Bekhit	10 October 1983	setter	(Egypt) Al-Ahly SC
3	Fahif Abdelhalim			
4	Ahmed Abdelhay	19 August 1984	outside hitter	
5	Abdellatif Ahmed	13 August 1983	middle blocker	(United Arab Emirates) Al-Nasr SC
7	Ashraf Abouelhassan	17 May 1975	setter	(Egypt) Zamalek SC
9	Rashad Atia	2 September 1986		
10	Ahmed Mohamed	1 March 1989	outside hitter	
15	Ahmed El Kotb	23 July 1991		
16	Mohamed Masoud	1 May 1994		
17	Reda Haikal	7 November 1990	outside hitter	
19	Mohamed Moawad	26 August 1987	libero	

== France ==
No.	Name	Date of birth	Position	Club
-	Marc Francastel	9 April 1963	coach	
1	Toafa Takaniko	29 May 1985	setter	(France) Nantes Volley
2	Baptiste Geiler	16 March 1987	outside hitter	(France) Arago de Sète
3	Jonas Aguenier	28 April 1992	middle blocker	(France) Nantes Volley
4	Adrien Taghin	11 August 1988	middle blocker	(France) Plessis-Robinson VB
5	Quentin Jouffroy	5 July 1993	middle blocker	(France) ASUL Lione
7	Florian Lacassie	16 November 1990	outside hitter	(France) GFC Ajaccio
8	Yoann Jaumel	16 September 1987	setter	(France) Avignone VB
9	Steve Peironet	20 May 1985	libero	(France) GFC Ajaccio
10	Yacine Louati	4 March 1992	outside hitter	(France) TLM Tourcoing
11	Trévor Clévenot	28 June 1994	outside hitter	(France) Spacer's Tolosa
12	Franck Lafitte	8 March 1989	middle blocker	(France) Montpellier UC
13	Horacio d'Almeida	11 June 1988	middle blocker	(France) TLM Tourcoing

== Italy ==
No.	Name	Date of birth	Position	Club
-	Andrea Giani	22 April 1970	coach	
1	Filippo Vedovotto	2 December 1990	outside hitter	(Italy) Pallavolo Padova
2	Marco Falaschi	18 September 1987	setter	(Italy) NMV Castellana
3	Andrea Galliani	6 January 1988	opposite	(Italy) PV Cuneo
5	Giorgio De Togni	7 July 1985	middle blocker	(Italy) AV San Giustino
6	Ludovico Dolfo	30 June 1989	outside hitter	(Italy) NMV Castellana
7	Simone Anzani	24 February 1992	middle blocker	(Italy) Argos Sora
9	Alessandro Preti	7 August 1992	outside hitter	(Italy) Volley Segrate
10	Filippo Lanza	3 March 1991	outside hitter	(Italy) Trentino Volley
11	Nicola Pesaresi	11 February 1991	libero	(Italy) Blu Volley Verona
12	Daniele Mazzone	4 June 1992	middle blocker	(Italy) Argos Sora
15	Pier Paolo Partenio	6 February 1993	setter	(Italy) Lube Macerata
18	Giulio Sabbi	10 August 1989	opposite	(Italy) NMV Castellana

== Macedonia ==
No.	Name	Date of birth	Position	Club
-	Nikolay Jeliazkov	26 February 1970	coach	(Italy) Corigliano Volley
1	Darko Angelovski	4 February 1994	libero	
2	Gjorgi Gjorgiev	22 May 1992	setter	(Bulgaria) MUI Dupnica
3	Gjoko Josifov	6 March 1985	middle blocker	(Austria) UVRW Arbesbach
4	Nikola Gjorgiev	23 July 1988	opposite	(Turkey) Maliye Milli Piyango
5	Vlado Milev	9 May 1987	outside hitter	(Austria) UVRW Arbesbach
6	Filip Despotovski	2 July 1986	setter	(Romania) Dinamo Bucarest
7	Aleksandar Milkov	12 May 1982	outside hitter	
8	Aleksandar Ljaftov	15 August 1990	outside hitter	
9	Jovica Simovski	17 November 1982	opposite	(France) GFC Ajaccio
13	Hristo Nikolov	5 October 1990	middle blocker	
15	Vuk Karanovikj	18 December 1987	outside hitter	
16	Blagoj Ginov	26 September 1983	libero	(Bosnia and Herzegovina) OK Kakanj

== Tunisia ==
No.	Name	Date of birth	Position	Club
-	Fethi Mkaouer		coach	
1	Saddem Hmissi	16 February 1991	libero	(Tunisia) Espérance Tunisi
2	Ahmed Kadhi	19 April 1989	middle blocker	(Algeria) NR Bordj
3	Marouane M'rabet	5 June 1985	outside hitter	(Tunisia) ES Sahel
4	Marouen Garci	31 March 1988	outside hitter	
5	Samir Sellami	13 July 1977	setter	(Tunisia) CS Sfaxien
7	Ilyès Karamosli	22 August 1989	outside hitter	
9	Hakim Zouari	28 March 1988	outside hitter	
10	Hamza Nagga	29 May 1990	opposite	(Tunisia) ES Sahel
11	Ismaïl Moalla	30 January 1990	middle blocker	(Tunisia) CS Sfaxien
12	Anouer Taouerghi	17 August 1983	libero	(Tunisia) CS Sfaxien
14	Bilel Ben Hassine	22 June 1983	middle blocker	(Tunisia) CS Sfaxien
16	Amen Allah Hmissi	6 April 1988	outside hitter	

== Turkey ==
No.	Name	Date of birth	Position	Club
-	Veljko Basić	3 October 1959	coach	
1	Ulaş Kıyak	11 August 1981	setter	(Turkey) Galatasaray SK
3	Hakkı Çapkınoğlu	20 July 1980	middle blocker	(Turkey) Arkas Izmir
4	Metin Toy	3 May 1994	opposite	(Turkey) Fenerbahçe SK
7	Can Ayvazoğlu	14 September 1989	outside hitter	(Turkey) Halkbank Ankara
8	Burutay Subaşı	15 July 1990	outside hitter	(Turkey) Arkas Izmir
9	Serhat Çoşkun	18 July 1987	opposite	(Turkey) Halkbank Ankara
10	Emre Batur	21 April 1988	middle blocker	(Turkey) Halkbank Ankara
11	Vefa Yılmaz	24 April 1982	setter	(Turkey) Maliye Milli Piyango
12	Halil Yücel	24 November 1989	outside hitter	(Turkey) Halkbank Ankara
13	Emin Gök	15 February 1988	middle blocker	(Turkey) Arkas Izmir
15	Mustafa Koç	23 February 1992	middle blocker	(Turkey) Arkas Izmir
18	Ramazan Kılıç	31 May 1984	libero	(Turkey) Fenerbahçe SK
