= 2013–14 CEV Challenge Cup =

- League: CEV Challenge Cup
- Sport: Volleyball
- Duration: 19 October 2013 – 29 March 2014

Finals
- Champions: (Turkey) Fenerbahçe Grundig
- Runners-up: (Italy) Andreoli Latina
- Finals MVP: (Serbia) Ivan Miljković (Fenerbahçe)

CEV Challenge Cup seasons
- ← 2012–13 2014–15 →

The 2013–14 CEV Challenge Cup was the 34th edition of the European Challenge Cup volleyball club tournament, the former CEV Cup.

Turkish club Fenerbahçe Grundig beat Italian Andreoli Latina in the final and achieved their first CEV Challenge Cup trophy. Serbian opposite Ivan Miljković was the Most Valuable Player of the final tournament.

== Participating teams ==
Country	Number of teams	Teams
Austria	3	Amstetten Hypo Nö, Holding Graz, Aon hotVolleys Vienna
Belarus	3	Kommunalnik Grodno, Shakhtior Soligorsk, Stroitel Minsk
Cyprus	3	Anorthosis Famagusta, Nea Salamina Famagusta, Pokka A.E. Karava
Finland	3	Hurrikaani Loimaa, Tiikerit Kokkola, VaLePa Sastamala
Netherlands	3	Draisma Dynamo Apeldoorn, FirmX Orion Doetinchem, Landstede Zwolle
Belgium	2	Euphony Asse-Lennik, Precura Antwerpen
Bosnia and Herzegovina	2	Mladost Brcko, MOK Jedinstvo Brcko
Croatia	2	Mladost Marina Kastela, Mursa Osijek
Estonia	2	Pärnu VK, Selver Tallinn
France	2	Chaumont VB 52, Nantes Rezé Métropole
Greece	2	Ethnikos Alexandroupolis, Foinikas Syros
Hungary	2	Fino Kaposvar, Gorter Kecskemeti
Norway	2	Forde VBK, Nyborg Bergen
Romania	2	Stiinta Explorari Baia Mare, Volei Municipal Zalau
Serbia	2	Crvena Zvezda Beograd, Ribnica Kraljevo
Slovakia	2	Chemes Humenné, Volley Team Bratislava
Switzerland	2	Chênois Geneve, TV Schönenwerd
Turkey	2	Fenerbahçe Grundig, İstanbul BBSK
Ukraine	2	Crimsoda Krasnoperekopsk, Lokomotyv Kharkiv
Czech Republic	1	Volejbal Brno
Israel	1	Maccabi Tel Aviv
Italy	1	Andreoli Latina
Luxembourg	1	Chev Diekirch
Poland	1	AZS Politechnika Warszawska
Portugal	1	Fonte Bastardo Açores
Russia	1	Fakel Novy Urengoy
Slovenia	1	Calcit Kamnik

== Qualification phase ==
=== 1st round ===
- 1st leg 19–20 October 2013
- 2nd leg 26–27 October 2013

Team 1	Agg.	Team 2	1st leg	2nd leg	Golden Set
Gorter Kecskemeti (Hungary)	4–4	(Bosnia and Herzegovina) Mladost Brcko	3–1	1–3	13–15
Kommunalnik Grodno (Belarus)	6–1	(Norway) Nyborg Bergen	3–0	3–1	
Fenerbahçe Grundig (Turkey)	6–1	(Cyprus) Anorthosis Famagusta	3–0	3–1	

=== 2nd round ===
- 1st leg 5–7 November 2013
- 2nd leg 26–28 November 2013

Team 1	Agg.	Team 2	1st leg	2nd leg
Andreoli Latina (Italy)	6–0	(Slovakia) Chemes Humenné	3–0	3–0
Pärnu VK (Estonia)	6–0	(Switzerland) Chênois Geneve	3–0	3–0
Holding Graz (Austria)	6–1	(Hungary) Fino Kaposvar	3–0	3–1
MOK Jedinstvo Brcko (Bosnia and Herzegovina)	2–6	(Slovenia) Calcit Kamnik	0–3	2–3
Maccabi Tel Aviv (Israel)	1–6	(Turkey) İstanbul BBSK	1–3	0–3
Pokka A.E. Karava (Cyprus)	2–6	(Switzerland) TV Schönenwerd	1–3	1–3
Kommunalnik Grodno (Belarus)	6–1	(Netherlands) Draisma Dynamo Apeldoorn	3–0	3–1
Fonte Bastardo Açores (Portugal)	2–6	(Belgium) Euphony Asse-Lennik	2–3	0–3
Forde VBK (Norway)	0–6	(Russia) Fakel Novy Urengoy	0–3	0–3
Nea Salamina Famagusta (Cyprus)	2–6	(Bosnia and Herzegovina) Mladost Brcko	2–3	0–3
Crvena Zvezda Beograd (Serbia)	5–4	(Finland) Hurrikaani Loimaa	3–1	2–3
Chev Diekirch (Luxembourg)	0–6	(France) Chaumont VB 52	0–3	0–3
Shakhtior Soligorsk (Belarus)	6–1	(Greece) Foinikas Syros	3–1	3–0
Stiinta Explorari Baia Mare (Romania)	2–6	(Belarus) Stroitel Minsk	1–3	1–3
Ribnica Kraljevo (Serbia)	1–6	(Finland) VaLePa Sastamala	1–3	0–3
AZS Politechnika Warszawska (Poland)	1–6	(Turkey) Fenerbahçe Grundig	0–3	1–3

== Main phase ==
=== 16th finals ===
- 1st leg 10–12 December 2013
- 2nd leg 17–19 December 2013

Team 1	Agg.	Team 2	1st leg	2nd leg	Golden Set
Andreoli Latina (Italy)	3–3	(Belgium) Precura Antwerpen	3–0	0–3	15–10
Pärnu VK (Estonia)	6–0	(Slovakia) Volley Team Bratislava	3–0	3–0	
Holding Graz (Austria)	2–6	(Estonia) Selver Tallinn	2–3	0–3	
Amstetten Hypo Nö (Austria)	0–6	(Slovenia) Calcit Kamnik	0–3	0–3	
İstanbul BBSK (Turkey)	6–0	(Croatia) Mladost Marina Kastela	3–0	3–0	
Aon hotVolleys Vienna (Austria)	5–3	(Switzerland) TV Schönenwerd	3–0	2–3	
Ethnikos Alexandroupolis (Greece)	5–4	(Belarus) Kommunalnik Grodno	3–1	2–3	
Volejbal Brno (Czech Republic)	4–6	(Belgium) Euphony Asse-Lennik	2–3	2–3	
Fakel Novy Urengoy (Russia)	4–5	(France) Nantes Rezé Métropole	3–2	1–3	
Tiikerit Kokkola (Finland)	6–0	(Bosnia and Herzegovina) Mladost Brcko	3–0	3–0	
Volei Municipal Zalau (Romania)	3–3	(Serbia) Crvena Zvezda Beograd	3–0	0–3	11–15
Crimsoda Krasnoperekopsk (Ukraine)	2–6	(France) Chaumont VB 52	2–3	0–3	
FirmX Orion Doetinchem (Netherlands)	1–6	(Belarus) Shakhtior Soligorsk	1–3	0–3	
Landstede Zwolle (Netherlands)	2–6	(Belarus) Stroitel Minsk	0–3	2–3	
Mursa Osijek (Croatia)	0–6	(Finland) VaLePa Sastamala	0–3	0–3	
Lokomotyv Kharkiv (Ukraine)	4–5	(Turkey) Fenerbahçe Grundig	3–2	1–3	

=== 8th finals ===
- 1st leg 14–15 January 2014
- 2nd leg 21–23 January 2014

Team 1	Agg.	Team 2	1st leg	2nd leg	Golden Set
Pärnu VK (Estonia)	0–6	(Italy) Andreoli Latina	0–3	0–3	
Calcit Kamnik (Slovenia)	5–4	(Estonia) Selver Tallinn	3–1	2–3	
İstanbul BBSK (Turkey)	6–1	(Austria) Aon hotVolleys Vienna	3–0	3–1	
Ethnikos Alexandroupolis (Greece)	4–3	(Belgium) Euphony Asse-Lennik	3–0	1–3	12–15
Tiikerit Kokkola (Finland)	3–3	(France) Nantes Rezé Métropole	3–0	0–3	13–15
Chaumont VB 52 (France)	3–6	(Serbia) Crvena Zvezda Beograd	2–3	1–3	
Stroitel Minsk (Belarus)	6–2	(Belarus) Shakhtior Soligorsk	3–1	3–1	
Fenerbahçe Grundig (Turkey)	5–3	(Finland) VaLePa Sastamala	3–0	2–3	

=== 4th finals ===
- 1st leg 4– 5 February 2014
- 2nd leg 12–13 February 2014

Team 1	Agg.	Team 2	1st leg	2nd leg
Calcit Kamnik (Slovenia)	1–6	(Italy) Andreoli Latina	1–3	0–3
Euphony Asse-Lennik (Belgium)	3–5	(Turkey) İstanbul BBSK	3–2	0–3
Crvena Zvezda Beograd (Serbia)	1–6	(France) Nantes Rezé Métropole	1–3	0–3
Stroitel Minsk (Belarus)	2–6	(Turkey) Fenerbahçe Grundig	2–3	0–3

== Final phase ==
=== Semi-finals ===
Team 1	Agg.	Team 2	1st leg	2nd leg
Andreoli Latina (Italy)	5–3	(Turkey) İstanbul BBSK	3–0	2–3
Fenerbahçe Grundig (Turkey)	6–1	(France) Nantes Rezé Métropole	3–1	3–0

==== First leg ====
Date	Time		Score		Set 1	Set 2	Set 3	Set 4	Set 5	Total	Report
26 Feb	20:30	Andreoli Latina (Italy)	3–0	(Turkey) İstanbul BBSK	25–18	25–13	25–22			75–53	Report
26 Feb	18:00	Fenerbahçe Grundig (Turkey)	3–1	(France) Nantes Rezé Métropole	25–21	25–17	20–25	25–15		95–78	Report

==== Second leg ====
Date	Time		Score		Set 1	Set 2	Set 3	Set 4	Set 5	Total	Report
2 Mar	18:30	İstanbul BBSK (Turkey)	3–2	(Italy) Andreoli Latina	34–36	25–16	25–21	19–25	15–13	118–111	Report
1 Mar	20:00	Nantes Rezé Métropole (France)	0–3	(Turkey) Fenerbahçe Grundig	13–25	16–25	18–25			47–75	Report

=== Final ===
==== First leg ====
Date	Time		Score		Set 1	Set 2	Set 3	Set 4	Set 5	Total	Report
26 Mar	20:30	Andreoli Latina (Italy)	3–2	(Turkey) Fenerbahçe Grundig	30–32	18–25	26–24	25–21	16–14	115–116	Report

==== Second leg ====
Date	Time		Score		Set 1	Set 2	Set 3	Set 4	Set 5	Total	Report
29 Mar	16:30	Fenerbahçe Grundig (Turkey)	3–0	(Italy) Andreoli Latina	25–22	25–19	25–17			75–58	Report

== Final standing ==
Rank	Team
1st place, gold medalist(s)	(Turkey) Fenerbahçe Grundig
2nd place, silver medalist(s)	(Italy) Andreoli Latina
Semifinalists	(Turkey) İstanbul BBSK
Semifinalists	(France) Nantes Rezé Métropole

2013–14 CEV Challenge Cup winners
(Turkey)
Fenerbahçe Grundig
1st title

Turgay Doğan, Zafer Tendar, İbrahim Başaran, Arslan Ekşi, Uğur Güneş, Luiz Felipe Fonteles, Emin Gök, Ivan Miljković, Metin Toy, Thiago Soares Alves, Ramazan Serkan Kılıç, Leonel Marshall Jr.
Head coach
Daniel Castellani
