= Luiz Felipe Fonteles =

Brazilian volleyball player

Felipe Fonteles
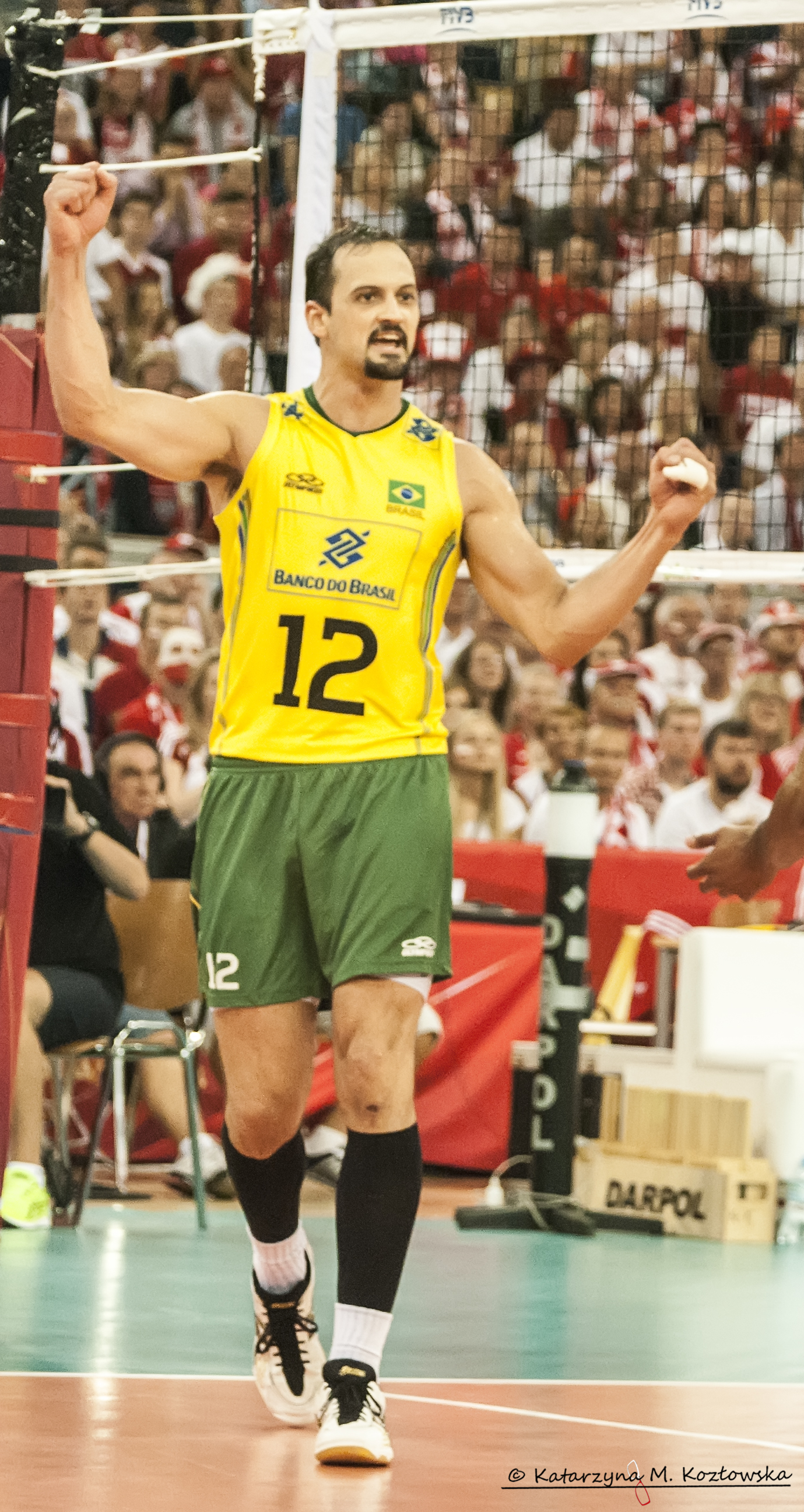

Personal information
- Full name: Luiz Felipe Marques Fonteles
- Nickname: Lipe
- Nationality: (Brazil) Brazilian
- Born: 19 June 1984 (age 42); Curitiba, Paraná, Brazil
- Height: 1.96 m (6 ft 5 in)
- Weight: 89 kg (196 lb)
- Spike: 330 cm (130 in)
- Block: 320 cm (126 in)

Volleyball information
- Position: Outside hitter
- Current club: (Japan) JTEKT Stings
- Number: 6

Career
Years	Teams
2002–2003	(Brazil) Esporte Clube Banespa
2003–2007	(Italy) Kerakoll Modena
2007–2009	(Japan) Panasonic Panthers
2009	(Brazil) Minas Tênis Clube
2009–2010	(Greece) Olympiacos Piraeus
2010–2011	(Brazil) Minas Tênis Clube
2011–2012	(Brazil) RJX
2012–2013	(Poland) ZAKSA Kędzierzyn-Koźle
2013–2014	(Turkey) Fenerbahçe Grundig
2014–2016	(Brazil) Vôlei Taubaté
2016–2017	(Turkey) Halkbank Ankara
2017–2019	(Brazil) SESI São Paulo
2019–2020	(Brazil) Vôlei Taubaté
2020–2022	(Japan) JTEKT Stings

National team
2005–2018	Brazil
Honours
Men's volleyball
Representing Brazil
Olympic Games
Gold medal – first place	2016 Rio de Janeiro
FIVB World Championship
Silver medal – second place	2014 Poland
Silver medal – second place	2018 Italy/Bulgaria
FIVB World Grand Champions Cup
Gold medal – first place	2013 Japan
FIVB World League
Silver medal – second place	2013 Mar del Plata
Silver medal – second place	2014 Florence
Silver medal – second place	2016 Kraków
Pan American Games
Gold medal – first place	2011 Guadalajara
CSV South American Championship
Gold medal – first place	2005 Lages
Gold medal – first place	2013 Cabo Frio

Luiz Felipe Marques Fonteles (born 19 June 1984) is a Brazilian volleyball player, member of the Brazil men's national volleyball team in 2005–2016 and previously played for Japanese team, JTEKT Stings, on club level. He is the 2016 Olympic Champion, silver medallist of the 2014 World Championship, two–time South American Champion (2005, 2013) and gold medallist of the 2011 Pan American Games.

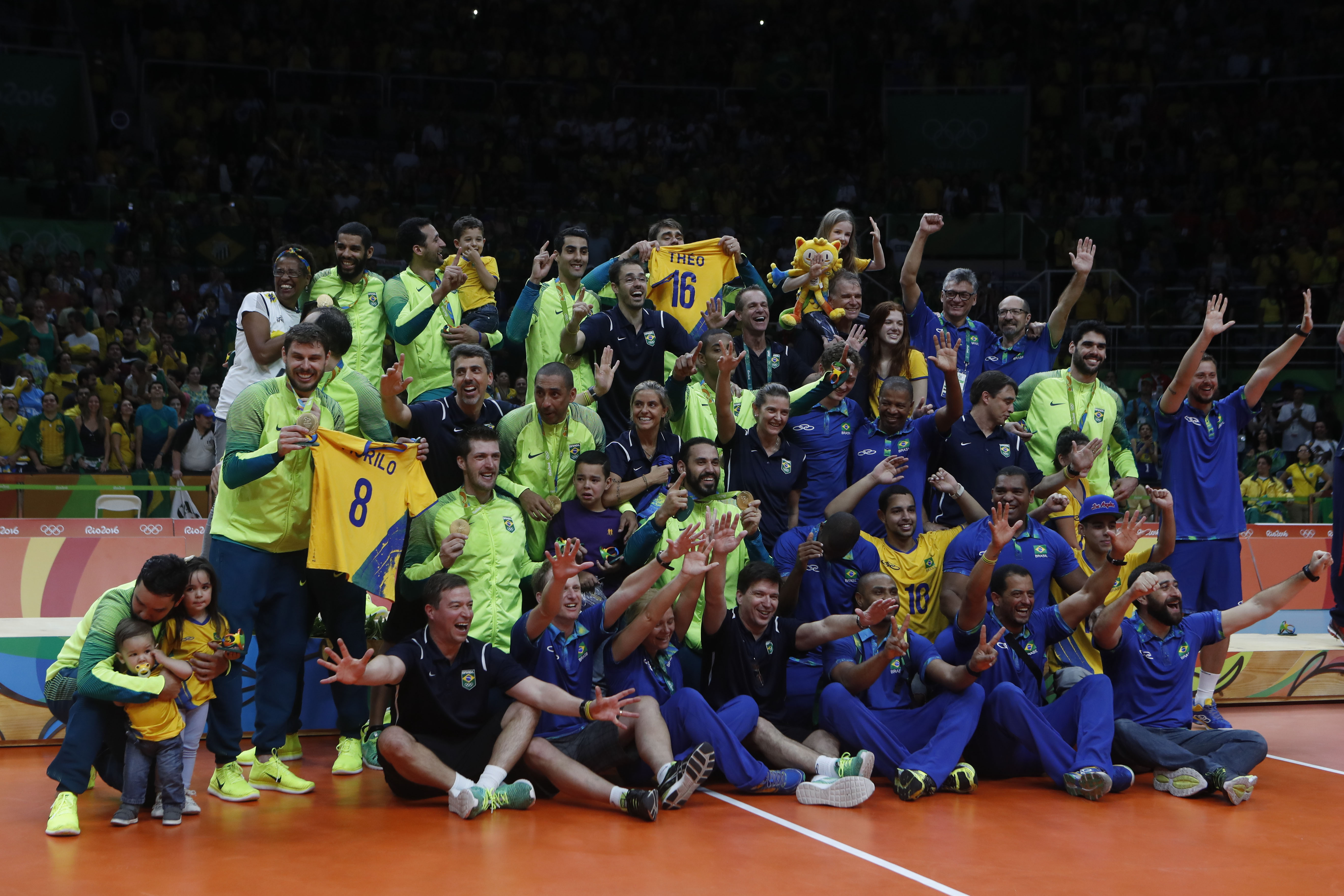
Medal ceremony, Brazil - 2016 Olympic Champions.

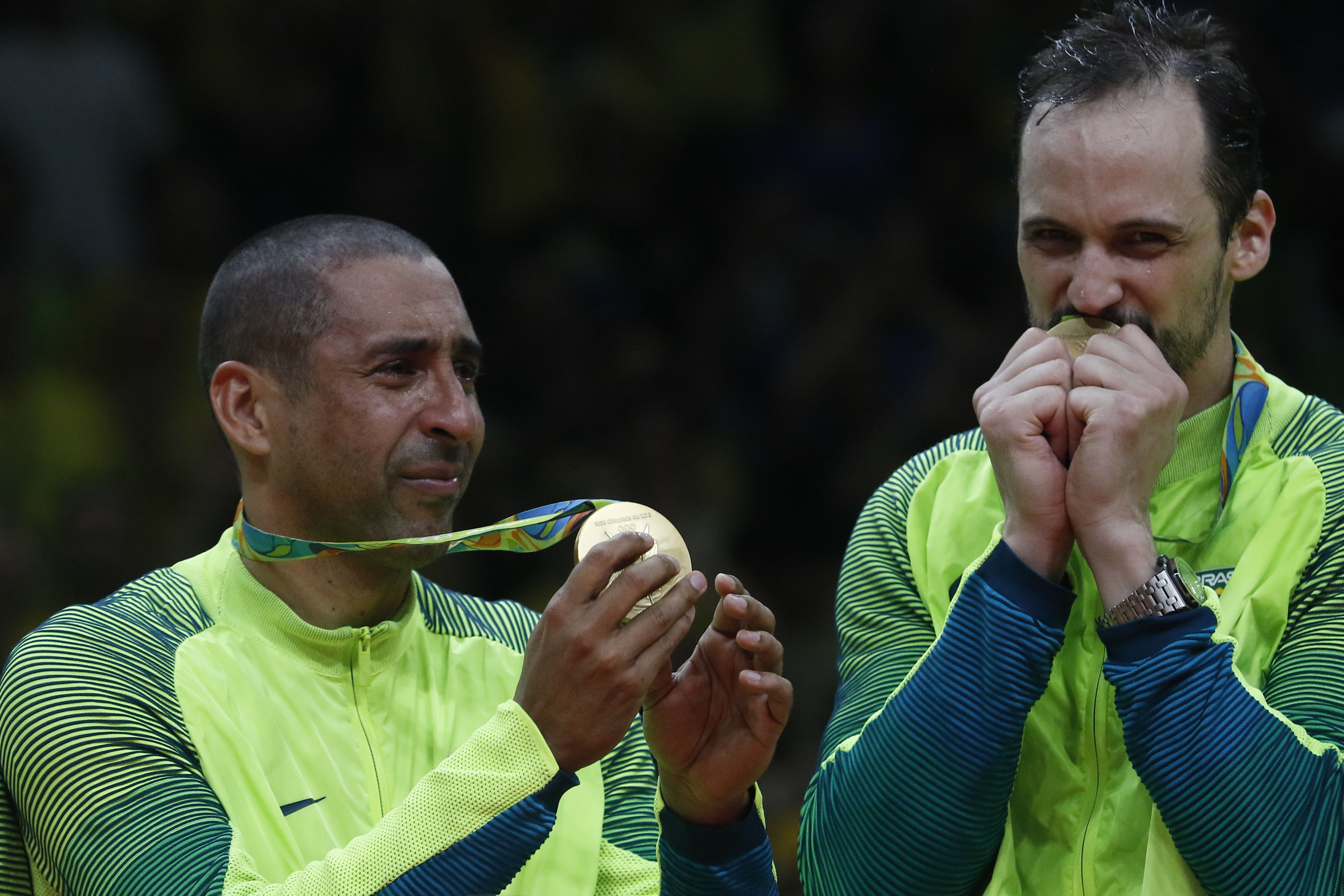
Lipe and Sérgio with gold medals at 2016 Olympics in Rio.

== Career ==
Season 2012/2013 spent as a player of ZAKSA Kędzierzyn-Koźle in Poland. He won silver medal of Polish Championship and Polish Cup 2013. Individually was the best player of PlusLiga in season 2012/2013. He was awarded: MVP and Best Spiker of Polish Cup, Best Server of CEV Champions League 2012/2013. In season 2013/2014 was a player of Fenerbahçe Grundig. In 2014 came back to Brazilian club – Funvic Taubaté.

== Sporting achievements ==
- CSV South American Club Championship
  - 2016 Taubate – with Vôlei Taubaté
- CEV Cup
  - 2006/2007 – with Cimone Modena
- CEV Challenge Cup
  - 2003/2004 – with Kerakoll Modena
  - 2013/2014 – with Fenerbahçe İstanbul
- Emperor's Cup All Japan Championship
  - 2020/21 – with JTEKT Stings
- National championships
  - 2007/2008 Japanese Championship, with Panasonic Panthers
  - 2009/2010 Greek Championship, with Olympiacos Piraeus
  - 2012/2013 Polish Cup, with ZAKSA Kędzierzyn-Koźle
  - 2012/2013 Polish Championship, with ZAKSA Kędzierzyn-Koźle
  - 2013/2014 Turkish Championship, with Fenerbahçe İstanbul
  - 2014/2015 Brazilian Cup, with Vôlei Taubaté
  - 2016/2017 Brazilian Cup, with Vôlei Taubaté
  - 2016/2017 Turkish Championship, with Halkbank Ankara

=== Youth national team ===
- 2003 FIVB U21 World Championship

=== Individual awards ===
- 2000 FIVB U19 South American Championship – Best scorer
- 2008 Japanese Championship – Best outside hitter
- 2013: Polish Cup – Best spiker
- 2013: Polish Cup – Most valuable player
- 2013: CEV Champions League – Best server
- 2014 Turkish Cup - Best Server
- 2014 Turkish Cup - Best Outside Hitter
- 2015 Brazilian Championship - Best Server
- 2019 Copa Libertadores - Best Outside Hitter
- 2022 Kurowashiki Tournament - Best Outside Hitter

Awards
Preceded by (Russia) Maksim Mikhaylov	Best Server of CEV Champions League; 2012/2013	Succeeded by (Turkey) Emre Batur
