= 2019 Men's European Volleyball League =

2019 Men's European League
Tournament details
- Host country: Estonia
- Dates: 25 May – 30 June
- Teams: 20 (from 1 confederation)

Final positions
- Champions: Turkey (1st title)
- Runners-up: Belarus
- Third place: Netherlands
- Fourth place: Estonia

Tournament awards
- MVP: (Turkey) Arslan Ekşi

The 2019 Men's European Volleyball League was the 16th edition of the annual Men's European Volleyball League, which featured men's national volleyball teams from twenty European countries. For the second season, the tournament had two groups: the Golden League, featuring twelve teams, and the Silver League, featuring eight teams.

It also acted as the European qualifying competition for the 2019 FIVB Volleyball Men's Challenger Cup, securing two vacancies for the tournament that then served as the qualifying competition for the cancelled 2020 FIVB Volleyball Men's Nations League.

== Pools composition ==
=== Golden League ===
Pool A	Pool B	Pool C
Belgium	Croatia	Belarus
Latvia	Estonia	Czech Republic
Slovakia	Spain	Finland
Turkey	Netherlands	Ukraine

=== Silver League ===
Pool A	Pool B
Austria	Azerbaijan
Bosnia and Herzegovina	Denmark
Greece	Georgia
Hungary	Romania

== League round ==
- All times are local.

=== Golden League ===
==== Pool A ====
Pos	Team	Pld	W	L	Pts	SW	SL	SR	SPW	SPL	SPR	Qualification
1	Turkey	6	6	0	18	18	2	9.000	496	368	1.348	Golden League Final round
2	Latvia	6	3	3	10	11	12	0.917	501	530	0.945	
3	Slovakia	6	2	4	6	9	15	0.600	500	538	0.929	
4	Belgium	6	1	5	2	8	17	0.471	521	582	0.895	

Date	Time		Score		Set 1	Set 2	Set 3	Set 4	Set 5	Total	Report
26 May	14:00	Turkey	3–0	Latvia	25–21	26–24	25–20			76–65	Report
26 May	18:00	Belgium	3–2	Slovakia	14–25	21–25	25–19	25–21	15–13	100–103	Report
29 May	19:40	Latvia	2–3	Slovakia	21–25	29–27	26–24	16–25	17–19	109–120	Report
29 May	20:00	Belgium	1–3	Turkey	25–22	14–25	22–25	21–25		82–97	Report
1 Jun	18:10	Latvia	3–1	Belgium	22–25	25–19	25–20	25–21		97–85	Report
1 Jun	19:00	Slovakia	0–3	Turkey	20–25	18–25	17–25			55–75	Report
8 Jun	14:00	Turkey	3–0	Slovakia	25–15	25–11	25–17			75–43	Report
8 Jun	20:00	Belgium	1–3	Latvia	25–16	21–25	22–25	23–25		91–91	Report
12 Jun	16:30	Turkey	3–1	Belgium	25–20	23–25	25–14	25–16		98–75	Report
12 Jun	16:00	Slovakia	1–3	Latvia	22–25	15–25	25–16	21–25		83–91	Report
15 Jun	18:00	Slovakia	3–1	Belgium	21–25	25–22	25–20	25–21		96–88	Report
16 Jun	18:10	Latvia	0–3	Turkey	18–25	16–25	14–25			48–75	Report

==== Pool B ====
Pos	Team	Pld	W	L	Pts	SW	SL	SR	SPW	SPL	SPR	Qualification
1	Netherlands	6	4	2	10	14	12	1.167	564	538	1.048	Golden League Final round
2	Spain	6	3	3	11	14	10	1.400	540	522	1.034	
3	Croatia	6	3	3	11	13	11	1.182	538	523	1.029	
4	Estonia (Note: Qualified as hosts) (H)	6	2	4	4	8	16	0.500	494	553	0.893	Golden League Final round

(H) Host
Notes:

Date	Time		Score		Set 1	Set 2	Set 3	Set 4	Set 5	Total	Report
25 May	17:00	Netherlands	3–2	Croatia	25–20	17–25	26–24	20–25	15–10	103–104	Report
25 May	18:00	Spain	3–1	Estonia	25–18	25–18	21–25	25–19		96–80	Report
29 May	16:30	Croatia	3–1	Estonia	24–26	25–20	25–13	25–21		99–80	Report
29 May	20:00	Spain	2–3	Netherlands	16–25	25–18	24–26	25–22	12–15	102–106	Report
1 Jun	16:30	Croatia	0–3	Spain	22–25	22–25	15–25			59–75	Report
2 Jun	20:00	Estonia	3–2	Netherlands	25–22	25–23	19–25	20–25	16–14	105–109	Report
8 Jun	20:00	Estonia	3–2	Croatia	27–29	17–25	25–13	25–21	15–10	109–98	Report
9 Jun	16:30	Netherlands	3–2	Spain	25–15	25–23	22–25	20–25	15–11	107–99	Report
12 Jun	18:30	Spain	1–3	Croatia	19–25	25–23	28–30	20–25		92–103	Report
12 Jun	19:30	Netherlands	3–0	Estonia	25–19	25–17	25–17			75–53	Report
15 Jun	16:30	Croatia	3–0	Netherlands	25–19	25–23	25–22			75–64	Report
15 Jun	20:00	Estonia	0–3	Spain	24–26	23–25	20–25			67–76	Report

==== Pool C ====
Pos	Team	Pld	W	L	Pts	SW	SL	SR	SPW	SPL	SPR	Qualification
1	Belarus	6	4	2	13	15	8	1.875	535	513	1.043	Golden League Final round
2	Ukraine	6	4	2	12	15	9	1.667	552	507	1.089	
3	Czech Republic	6	4	2	10	13	12	1.083	535	544	0.983	
4	Finland	6	0	6	1	4	18	0.222	468	526	0.890	Relegated position

Date	Time		Score		Set 1	Set 2	Set 3	Set 4	Set 5	Total	Report
25 May	19:00	Finland	1–3	Ukraine	30–28	22–25	17–25	22–25		91–103	Report
26 May	19:30	Belarus	3–1	Czech Republic	19–25	25–18	25–20	27–25		96–88	Report
29 May	19:30	Belarus	3–0	Finland	25–23	25–23	25–20			75–66	Report
29 May	19:00	Czech Republic	3–2	Ukraine	17–25	20–25	25–18	25–18	15–13	102–99	Report
1 Jun	19:30	Belarus	3–1	Ukraine	25–18	25–22	20–25	26–24		96–89	Report
1 Jun	19:00	Czech Republic	3–1	Finland	17–25	25–22	25–15	25–22		92–84	Report
8 Jun	18:00	Czech Republic	3–1	Belarus	25–21	25–18	19–25	25–23		94–87	Report
8 Jun	19:00	Ukraine	3–0	Finland	25–16	25–20	25–23			75–59	Report
12 Jun	19:30	Finland	0–3	Belarus	22–25	23–25	20–25			65–75	Report
12 Jun	20:00	Ukraine	3–0	Czech Republic	25–20	25–20	25–13			75–53	Report
15 Jun	17:00	Ukraine	3–2	Belarus	23–25	25–23	25–22	23–25	15–11	111–106	Report
15 Jun	18:00	Finland	2–3	Czech Republic	25–18	25–27	15–25	25–21	13–15	103–106	Report

=== Silver League ===
==== Pool A ====
Pos	Team	Pld	W	L	Pts	SW	SL	SR	SPW	SPL	SPR	Qualification
1	Greece	6	5	1	15	16	5	3.200	511	428	1.194	Silver League Final round
2	Austria	6	5	1	15	15	5	3.000	478	437	1.094	
3	Hungary	6	1	5	3	7	16	0.438	498	549	0.907	
4	Bosnia and Herzegovina	6	1	5	3	4	16	0.250	400	473	0.846	

Date	Time		Score		Set 1	Set 2	Set 3	Set 4	Set 5	Total	Report
25 May	17:30	Hungary	3–1	Bosnia and Herzegovina	25–22	20–25	25–23	25–17		95–87	Report
26 May	18:00	Austria	3–1	Greece	25–23	25–20	21–25	25–22		96–90	Report
29 May	19:30	Greece	3–1	Hungary	25–14	25–23	23–25	25–22		98–84	Report
29 May	20:00	Bosnia and Herzegovina	0–3	Austria	12–25	18–25	17–25			47–75	Report
1 Jun	19:30	Greece	3–0	Austria	27–25	25–21	25–13			77–59	Report
2 Jun	20:00	Bosnia and Herzegovina	3–1	Hungary	25–14	20–25	25–17	25–22		95–78	Report
8 Jun	17:30	Hungary	1–3	Greece	25–21	23–25	17–25	15–25		80–96	Report
9 Jun	20:25	Austria	3–0	Bosnia and Herzegovina	25–20	25–21	25–21			75–62	Report
12 Jun	19:30	Greece	3–0	Bosnia and Herzegovina	25–20	25–15	25–17			75–52	Report
12 Jun	20:25	Austria	3–1	Hungary	19–25	28–26	25–19	25–23		97–93	Report
15 Jun	17:30	Hungary	0–3	Austria	24–26	21–25	23–25			68–76	Report
15 Jun	20:00	Bosnia and Herzegovina	0–3	Greece	16–25	20–25	21–25			57–75	Report

==== Pool B ====
Pos	Team	Pld	W	L	Pts	SW	SL	SR	SPW	SPL	SPR	Qualification
1	Romania	6	6	0	18	18	2	9.000	505	392	1.288	Silver League Final round
2	Denmark	6	4	2	12	12	6	2.000	428	357	1.199	
3	Azerbaijan	6	2	4	6	8	13	0.615	452	459	0.985	
4	Georgia	6	0	6	0	1	18	0.056	291	468	0.622	

Date	Time		Score		Set 1	Set 2	Set 3	Set 4	Set 5	Total	Report
25 May	17:00	Azerbaijan	1–3	Romania	25–23	21–25	18–25	22–25		86–98	Report
25 May	16:00	Denmark	3–0	Georgia	25–20	25–20	25–12			75–52	Report
29 May	17:00	Romania	3–0	Denmark	25–15	25–21	32–30			82–66	Report
29 May	19:00	Georgia	1–3	Azerbaijan	25–18	11–25	11–25	17–25		64–93	Report
1 Jun	17:00	Romania	3–0	Georgia	25–7	25–11	25–20			75–38	Report
2 Jun	16:00	Denmark	3–0	Azerbaijan	25–23	25–10	25–19			75–52	Report
8 Jun	16:00	Georgia	0–3	Denmark	10–25	22–25	9–25			41–75	Report
8 Jun	19:30	Romania	3–1	Azerbaijan	25–19	23–25	25–21	27–25		100–90	Report
12 Jun	17:00	Azerbaijan	3–0	Georgia	25–17	25–8	25–22			75–47	Report
12 Jun	18:30	Denmark	0–3	Romania	20–25	19–25	23–25			62–75	Report
15 Jun	16:00	Georgia	0–3	Romania	15–25	19–25	15–25			49–75	Report
15 Jun	17:00	Azerbaijan	0–3	Denmark	17–25	20–25	18–25			55–75	Report

== Final round ==
=== Silver League ===
- All times are local.

==== Final ====
Team 1	Agg.	Team 2	1st leg	2nd leg
Greece	1–5	Romania	2–3	0–3

===== Leg 1 =====
Date	Time		Score		Set 1	Set 2	Set 3	Set 4	Set 5	Total	Report
26 Jun	20:00	Greece	2–3	Romania	25–20	28–30	25–20	23–25	10–15	111–110	Report

===== Leg 2 =====
Date	Time		Score		Set 1	Set 2	Set 3	Set 4	Set 5	Total	Report
30 Jun	17:00	Romania	3–0	Greece	25–21	25–23	25–21			75–65	Report

=== Golden League ===
- Venue: Saku Suurhall, Tallinn, Estonia
- All times are Eastern European Summer Time (UTC+03:00).

Semifinals
21 June
Netherlands	1
Belarus	3
21 June
Turkey	3
Estonia	1

Final
22 June
Belarus	0
Turkey	3
3rd place match
22 June
Netherlands	3
Estonia	0

==== Semifinals ====
Date	Time		Score		Set 1	Set 2	Set 3	Set 4	Set 5	Total	Report
21 Jun	16:00	Netherlands	1–3	Belarus	22–25	31–29	19–25	21–25		93–104	Report
21 Jun	19:00	Turkey	3–1	Estonia	25–23	22–25	25–21	28–26		100–95	Report

==== 3rd place match ====
Date	Time		Score		Set 1	Set 2	Set 3	Set 4	Set 5	Total	Report
22 Jun	16:00	Netherlands	3–0	Estonia	25–22	25–16	25–16			75–54	Report

==== Final ====
Date	Time		Score		Set 1	Set 2	Set 3	Set 4	Set 5	Total	Report
22 Jun	19:00	Belarus	0–3	Turkey	16–25	21–25	19–25			56–75	Report

== Final standing ==
Rank	Team
1st place, gold medalist(s)	Turkey
2nd place, silver medalist(s)	Belarus
3rd place, bronze medalist(s)	Netherlands
4	Estonia
5	Latvia
5	Spain
5	Ukraine
8	Croatia
8	Czech Republic
8	Slovakia
11	Belgium
11	Finland
13	Romania
14	Greece
15	Austria
15	Denmark
17	Azerbaijan
17	Hungary
19	Bosnia and Herzegovina
19	Georgia

Qualified for the 2019 Challenger Cup

2019 European League champions

Turkey
1st title

14-man Roster for Golden League Final Round
İzzet Ünver, Çagatay Durmaz, Burutay Subaşı, Yasin Aydın, Arslan Ekşi, Yiğit Gülmezoğlu, Adis Lagumdzija, Oguzhan Karasu, Metin Toy, Burak Mert, Dogukan Ulu, Ertuğrul Gazi Metin, Ogulcan Yatgin, Volkan Döne
Head coach
Nedim Özbey

== Awards ==
- Most Valuable Player

(Turkey) Arslan Ekşi

== See also ==
- 2019 Women's European Volleyball League
