= Meisam Salehi =

Iranian volleyball player (born 1998)

Personal information
- Born: 17 November 1998 (age 27); Urmia, Iran
- Hometown: Urmia
- Height: 1.98 m (6 ft 6 in)
- Weight: 89 kg (196 lb)
- Spike: 383 cm (151 in)
- Block: 355 cm (140 in)

Volleyball information
- Position: Outside hitter
- Current club: Fenerbahçe
- Number: 17

Career
Years	Teams
2017–2020; 2020–2021; 2021; 2022–2024; 2024–	(Iran) Kalleh Mazandaran (Iran) Shahrdari Urmia (Poland) AZS Olsztyn (Iran) Shahdab Yazd; Fenerbahçe

National team
2017–	Iran
Honours
Men's volleyball
Representing Iran
AVC Asian Championship
Gold medal – first place	2021 Chiba	Team
Silver medal – second place	2023 Urmia	Team
Asian Games
Gold medal – first place	2022 Hangzhou	Team

Meisam Salehi, also known as Meysam Salehi (Persian: میثم صالحی; born 17 November 1998) is an Iranian volleyball player of Fenerbahçe who plays as an outside hitter for the Iranian national volleyball team. He made his maiden appearance at the Olympic Games in Tokyo 2020.

== Career ==
=== Clubs ===
Salehi made his debut in the Iranian Super League for Kalleh Mazandaran in 2017. In 2020, he signed a contract with Shahrdari Urmia, and one year later won a silver medal of the Iranian Championship. For the 2021–22 season, he joined Indykpol AZS Olsztyn, PlusLiga.

=== National team ===
He was part of the team which finished fifth at the 2017 U21 World Championship held in Czech Republic. A member of the teams that competed at the 2018, 2019 and 2021 Nations League editions. Salehi was part of the Iranian national team which competed at the 2020 Summer Olympics.

== Honours ==
- 2022–2023 Iranian Volleyball Super League – with Shahdab Yazd
- 2024–2025 Turkish Cup - with Fenerbahçe
