= Burak Yavuz =

Turkish volleyball player (born 1975)

Personal information
- Full name: Burak Yavuz
- Born: November 6, 1975 (age 50); Bursa, Turkey
- Height: 1.85 m (6 ft 1 in)

Volleyball information
- Position: Setter
- Current club: (Turkey) Fenerbahçe SK
- Number: 5

National team
| 2007-present | Turkey |
Honours
Men's volleyball
Representing Turkey
Universiade
| Gold medal – first place | Izmir 2005 | Team competition |
Representing Fenerbahçe SK
Turkish Volleyball League
| Gold medal – first place | 2009-10 League | Team competition |
| Silver medal – second place | 2008-09 League | Team competition |
Balkan Cup
| Gold medal – first place | Thessaloniki 2009 | Team competition |

Burak Yavuz (born November 6, 1975, in Bursa) is a Turkish volleyball player. He is 185 cm tall and plays as a setter.

Yavuz has played for Fenerbahçe SK since 2008 and wears the number 5 jersey. He played 85 times for the national team and also played for Arçelik.

== Honours and awards ==
- 2005 Summer Universiade Champion with Turkey
- 2008-09 CEV Champions League Top 16 with Fenerbahçe SK
- 2008-09 Turkish Men's Volleyball League runner-up with Fenerbahçe SK
- 2009-10 Balkan Cup Champion with Fenerbahçe SK
- 2009-10 Turkish Men's Volleyball League Champion with Fenerbahçe SK
- 2010-11 Turkish Men's Volleyball League Champion with Fenerbahçe SK
