= Kemal Kayhan =

Turkish volleyball player (born 1983)

Personal information
- Full name: Kemal Kayhan
- Born: 2 January 1983 (age 43); Zonguldak, Turkey
- Height: 2.00 m (6 ft 6 1/2 in)

Volleyball information
- Position: Middle blocker
- Current club: (Turkey) Fenerbahçe Grundig
- Number: 6

National team
2004	Turkey

Kemal Kayhan (born 2 January 1983) is a Turkish volleyball player. He is 200 cm and plays as middle blocker. He plays for Fenerbahçe Grundig and wears number 6. He also played for Çankaya Belediyesi (2000–06), Polis Akademisi (2006–07) and Halkbank Ankara (2007–09).

He was capped 60 times for the national team.

== Sporting achievements ==
=== Clubs ===
==== CEV Challenge Cup ====
- 2013/2014 2013/2014 – with Fenerbahçe Istanbul

==== National championships ====
- 2010/2011 Turkish Championship, with Fenerbahçe Istanbul
- 2011/2012 Turkish SuperCup 2011, with Fenerbahçe Istanbul
- 2011/2012 Turkish Cup, with Fenerbahçe Istanbul
- 2011/2012 Turkish Championship, with Fenerbahçe Istanbul
- 2015/2016 Turkish SuperCup 2015, with Halkbank Ankara
- 2015/2016 Turkish Championship, with Halkbank Ankara

=== Individually ===
- 2010 Turkish League - Best Blocker
