= Deha (disambiguation) =

Deha may refer to:

- Deha, a caste found in India
- Deha Bozkan, a Turkish volleyball player

== See also ==
- DEHA (disambiguation)
