= Wouter ter Maat =

Dutch volleyball player (born 1991)

Personal information
- Born: 7 May 1991 (age 35) Rijssen, Netherlands
- Height: 1.99 m (6 ft 6 in)
- Weight: 97 kg (214 lb)
- Spike: 355 cm (140 in)
- Block: 346 cm (136 in)

Volleyball information
- Position: Opposite
- Current club: Ziraat Bankası Ankara
- Number: 2

Career
- Years: Team
- 2008–2014 2014–2015 2015–2016 2016–2017 2017–2018 2018–2020 2020–2025: RIVO Rijssen; VC Zwolle; Volley Gent; Berlin Recycling Volleys; Paris Volley; Fenerbahçe; Ziraat Bankası Ankara

National team
- Years: Team
- –: Netherlands
Honours
Men's volleyball
Representing Netherlands
European League
Bronze medal – third place	2019 Estonia

Wouter ter Maat (born 7 May 1991) is a Dutch professional volleyball player who plays as an opposite spiker for Ziraat Bankası Ankara and the Netherlands national team.

== Honours ==
=== Club ===
- CEV Challenge Cup
  - 2020–21 – with Ziraat Bankası Ankara
- Domestic
  - 2014–15 Dutch Cup, with VC Zwolle
  - 2014–15 Dutch Championship, with VC Zwolle
  - 2016–17 German Championship, with Berlin Recycling Volleys
  - 2018–19 Turkish Cup, with Fenerbahçe
  - 2018–19 Turkish Championship, with Fenerbahçe
  - 2020–21 Turkish Championship, with Ziraat Bankası Ankara
  - 2021–22 Turkish SuperCup, with Ziraat Bankası Ankara
  - 2021–22 Turkish Championship, with Ziraat Bankası Ankara
  - 2022–23 Turkish SuperCup, with Ziraat Bankası Ankara
  - 2022–23 Turkish Championship, with Ziraat Bankası Ankara
  - 2023–24 Turkish SuperCup, with Ziraat Bankası Ankara
