= Fenerbahçe S.K. (men's volleyball) =

Turkish sports club

Fenerbahçe
- Full name: Fenerbahçe Spor Kulübü
- Short name: FB; Fener
- Nickname: Sarı Lacivertliler (The Yellow-Navy Blues); Fener
- Founded: 1927
- Ground: Ülker Sports Arena Metro Energy Hall (Capacity: 2,000)
- Chairman: Aziz Yıldırım
- Manager: Taner Atik
- Captain: Fabian Drzyzga
- League: Efeler Ligi
- 2025–26: 5th place
- Website: Club home page
- Championships: 1 CEV Challenge Cup; 2 Balkan Cups; 5 Turkish Championships; 5 Turkish Cups; 4 Turkish Super Cups

Uniforms
Home	Away

Fenerbahçe Men's Volleyball, currently known as Fenerbahçe Medicana for sponsorship reasons, are the men's volleyball department of Fenerbahçe SK, a major Turkish multi-sport club based in Istanbul, Turkey. Founded in 1927, they are one of the most successful volleyball teams in Turkey, having won five Turkish Volleyball League titles, five Turkish Cups, and four Turkish Super Cups, among others. In Europe Fenerbahçe have won two Balkan Cups and the CEV Challenge Cup in the 2013–14 season, thus writing volleyball history as the women's team won another continental title, the CEV Cup, the very same day. By achieving this unparalleled feat, Fenerbahçe became the first and only sports club in Turkey and one of a few in Europe with European titles won in both the men's and women's volleyball departments.

The club play their home matches at the 7,000-seated TVF Burhan Felek Sport Hall.

== Previous names ==
- Fenerbahçe (1927–2011)
- Fenerbahçe Grundig (2011–2015)
- Fenerbahçe (2015–2019)
- Fenerbahçe HDI Sigorta (2019–2023)
- Fenerbahçe Parolapara (2023–2024)
- Fenerbahçe Medicana (2024–present)

== History ==
After a series of intermittent existences, 1927–1935, 1940–1942, 1943–1971, it was founded in its present form in 1976. The team began in the Istanbul Fourth League and was promoted to the Third League in 1977, to the Second League in 1982 and finally to the First League in 1984. As champions of the Istanbul First League in 1985, Fenerbahçe were promoted to the top-level Men's Volleyball League.

== Honours ==
=== European competitions ===
Fenerbahçe S.K.
Medal record

Men's volleyball

Representing Fenerbahçe

CEV Challenge Cup
Gold medal – first place	CEV Challenge Cup	2013–14

Balkan Cup
Gold medal – first place	Balkan Cup	2009
Gold medal – first place	Balkan Cup	2013

=== European competitions ===
- CEV Champions League

Top 16 (1): 2008–2009

- CEV Top Teams Cup / CEV Cup

Semifinalists (2): 2016–17, 2023–24
Quarterfinalists (4): 2004–05, 2011–12, 2014–15, 2024–25

- CEV Challenge Cup

Winners (1): 2013–14

- Balkan Cup

Winners (2) (shared-record): 2009, 2013

=== Domestic competitions ===
- Turkish Men's Volleyball League

Winners (5): 2007–08, 2009–10, 2010–11, 2011–12, 2018–19
Runners-up (6): 2003–04, 2005–06, 2008–09, 2013–14, 2020–21, 2023–24
Third place (5): 2006–07, 2016–17, 2021–22, 2022–23, 2024–25

- Turkish Men's Volleyball Championship

Third place (3): 1961–62, 1966–67, 1967–68

- Turkish Cup

Winners (5): 2007–08, 2011–12, 2016–17, 2018–19, 2024–25
Runners-up (3): 2010–11, 2013–14, 2022–23

- Turkish Super Cup

Winners (4): 2011, 2012, 2017, 2020
Runners-up (4): 2010, 2014, 2019, 2025

- Turkish Federation Cup

Winners (2): 1961–62, 1965–66
Runners-up (2): 1960–61, 1969–70

- Istanbul Men's Volleyball League

Winners (10): 1926–27, 1927–28, 1928–29, 1929–30, 1932–33, 1933–34, 1940–41, 1966–67, 1967–68, 1968–69
Runners-up (6): 1934–35, 1945–46, 1962–63, 1963–64, 1964–65, 1965–66
Third place (4): 1931–32, 1944–45, 1946–47, 1961–62

== The road to the CEV Challenge Cup victory ==
Round	Opponent	Home	Away
Qualification Round 1	(Cyprus) Anorthosis Famagusta	3–0	1–3
Qualification Round 2	(Poland) AZS Politechnika Warszawska	3–1	0–3
16th Final	(Ukraine) Lokomotyv Kharkiv	3–1	3–2
8th Final	(Finland) VaLePa Sastamala	3–0	3–2
Quarterfinal	(Belarus) Stroitel Minsk	3–0	2–3
Semifinal	(France) Nantes Rezé Métropole	3–1	0–3
Final	(Italy) Andreoli Latina	3–0	3–2

== Roster ==
Players as of June 8, 2026

No.	Player	D.O.B.	Position	Height (m)
1	(Turkey) Kaan Gürbüz	16/08/2001	Opposite	1.97
2	(France) Barthélémy Chinenyeze	25/02/1998	Middle blocker	2.04
5	(Turkey) Mert Matić	22/05/1995	Middle blocker	2.11
7	(Turkey) Mirza Lagumdžija	18/05/2001	Outside hitter	2.07
8	(Turkey) Burutay Subaşı	15/07/1990	Libero	1.94
10	(Turkey) Bedirhan Bülbül	29/07/1999	Middle blocker	2.01
11	(Turkey) Beytullah Hatipoğlu	24/02/1992	Libero	1.90
12	(Turkey) Adis Lagumdžija	29/03/1999	Opposite	2.11
13	(Turkey) Yiğit Gülmezoğlu	28/12/1995	Outside hitter	1.94
14	(Brazil) Fernando Kreling	13/01/1996	Setter	1.85
17	(Turkey) Muhammed Kaya	07/02/1995	Setter	1.90
21	(Turkey) Caner Dengin	15/12/1987	Libero	1.87
22	(United States) Matthew John Anderson	18/04/1987	Outside hitter	2.08

== Technical and managerial staff ==
Staff as of January 12, 2026

Name	Position
(Turkey) Mustafa Aydın Acun	Board member
(Turkey) Caner Pekşen	Team manager
(Turkey) Taner Atik	Head coach
(Turkey) Mert Karatop	Assistant coach
(Turkey) Kutay Derin	Statistics
(Turkey) Umut Beycan	Physiotherapist

== Team captains ==
This is a list of the senior team's captains in the recent years.

Period	Captain
2005–2006	(Turkey) Burak Hascan
2006–2009	(Turkey) Hakan Fertelli
2009–2015	(Turkey) Arslan Ekşi
2015–2018	(Turkey) Selçuk Keskin
2018–2021	(Turkey) Ulaş Kıyak
2021–2022	(Cuba) Salvador Hidalgo Oliva
2022–2023	(Iran) Saeid Marouf
2023–2024	(Turkey) Hasan Yeşilbudak
2024–present	(Poland) Fabian Drzyzga

== Head coaches ==
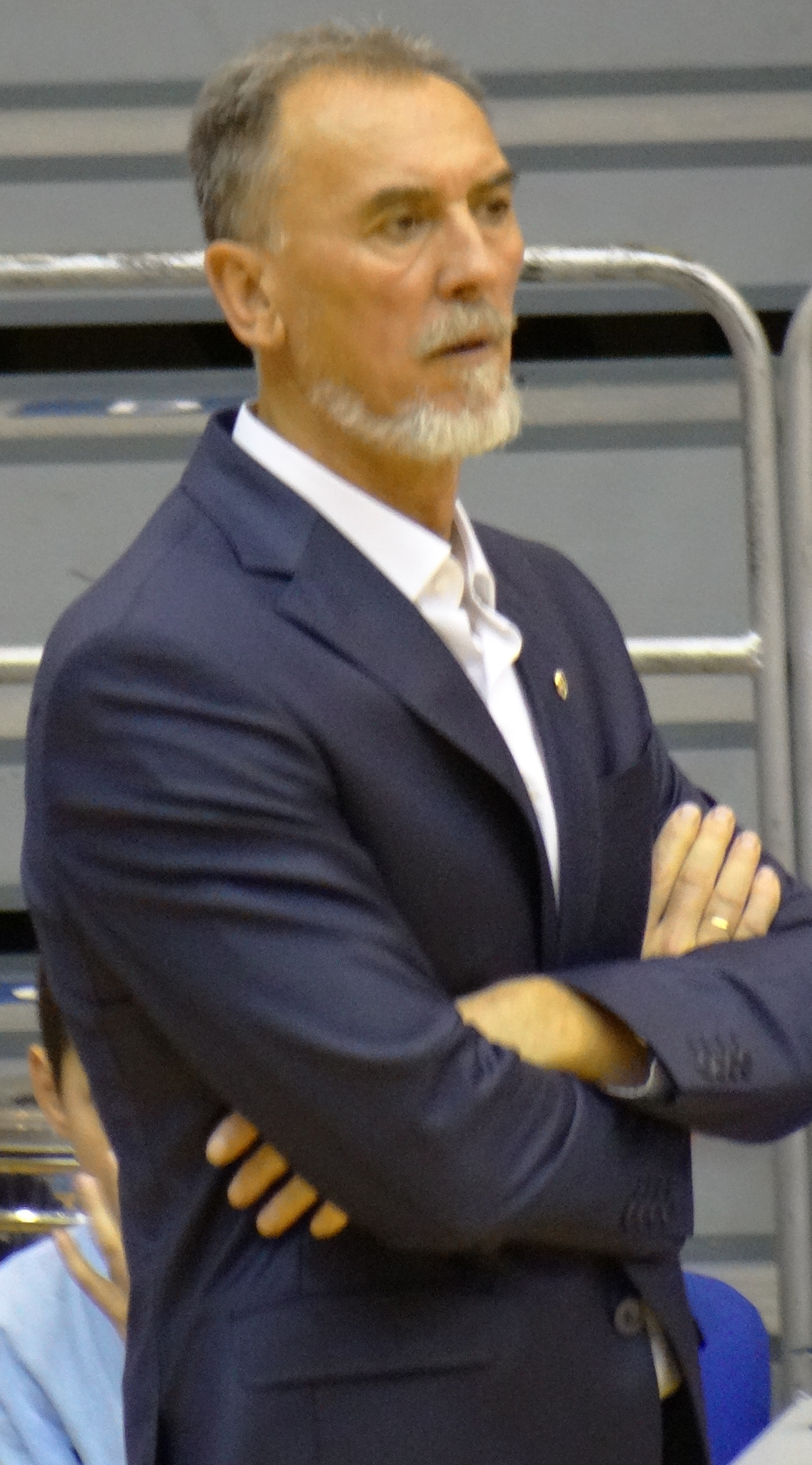
Veljko Basić

This is a list of the senior team's head coaches in the recent years.

Period	Head coach
1927–1929	(Turkey) Aziz Torun
1955–1958	(Turkey) Alaaddin Güneş
1958–1959	(Turkey) Atilla Sesören
1959–1961	(Turkey) Alaaddin Güneş
1961–1962	(Turkey) Ayhan Demir
1962–196?	(Turkey) Alaaddin Güneş
1966–1969	(Turkey) Hilmi Tüker
1969–1970	(Turkey) Metin Bıkmaz
1976–1977	(Turkey) Alaaddin Güneş
1978–1979	(Turkey) Mustafa Elitez
1980–1985	(Turkey) Erkan Yasa
1985–1990	(Turkey) İsmail Vuran
1990–1992	(Czech Republic) Richard Mislinkova
1992–1993	(Turkey) Abdullah Paşaoğlu
1993–2001	(Turkey) İsmail Vuran
2002	(Turkey) Cem Akyol
2002–2003	(Turkey) Deniz Esinduy
2005–2007	(Cuba) Jesús Savigne
2007–2011	(Hungary) György Demeter
2011–2012	(Argentina) Daniel Castellani
2012	(Italy) Daniele Bagnoli
2013	(Italy) Fabio Soli
2013–2015	(Argentina) Daniel Castellani
2015–2018	(France) Veljko Basić
2018–2020	(Poland) Mariusz Sordyl
2020–2021	(Turkey) Erkan Toğan
2021–2023	(Argentina) Daniel Castellani
2023–2024	(Turkey) Kerem Eryılmaz
2024–2026	(Serbia) Slobodan Kovač
2026–present	(Turkey) Taner Atik

== Home halls ==
This is a list of the home halls the senior team played at in the recent years.

#	Hall	Period
1	Caferağa Sport Hall	2004–2006
2	Burhan Felek Sport Hall	2006–2007
3	Caferağa Sport Hall	2007–2008
4	50th Anniversary Sport Hall	2008–2010
5	Burhan Felek Sport Hall	2010–2015
6	Ülker Sports Arena	2015–

== Notable players ==
Criteria

To appear in this section a player must have either:

- Played at least one season for the club.
- Set a club record or won an individual award while at the club.
- Played at least one official international match for their national team at any time.
- To perform very successfully during period in the club or at later/previous stages of his career.

Domestic Players

Turkey

- Kadir Arslan
- Murat Aslan
- Yasin Aydın
- Can Ayvazoğlu
- Dünya Baltacıoğlu
- Emre Batur
- Kenan Bengü
- Deha Bozkan
- Mustafa Cengiz
- Hakkı Çapkınoğlu
- Erden Çevikel
- Alperay Demirciler
- Turgay Doğan
- Ersin Durgut
- Osman Çağatay Durmaz
- Arslan Ekşi
- Hakan Fertelli
- Emin Gök
- Yiğit Gülmezoğlu
- Uğur Güneş
- Baturalp Burak Güngör
- Kaan Gürbüz
- Barış Hamaz
- Burak Hascan
- Özkan Hayırlı
- Oğuzhan Karasu
- Cengizhan Kartaltepe
- Kemal Kayhan
- Serkan Kılıç
- Berat Kısal
- Adis Lagumdžija (Bosnia and Herzegovina)
- Mirza Lagumdžija (Bosnia and Herzegovina)
- Soner Mezgitçi
- Ali Peçen
- Yasin Sancak
- Bora Josef Stanicki (Poland)
- Nuri Şahin
- Ayberk Sevinç
- Burutay Subaşı
- Resul Tekeli
- Ceyhun Tendar
- Ahmet Toçoğlu
- Metin Toy
- Ahmet Tümer
- Furkan Yalçınkaya
- Burak Yavuz
- Tolga Gani Zengin

European Players

Belgium

- Frank Depestele
- Kevin Klinkenberg
- Wout Wijsmans

Bulgaria

- Denis Karyagin
- Lyudmil Naydenov
- Nikolay Penchev
- Ivan Tasev

Croatia

- Tomislav Čošković (Turkey)

France

- Yacine Louati
- Barthélémy Chinenyeze
- Earvin N'Gapeth
- Guillaume Quesque
- Thibault Rossard

Germany

- Marcus Böhme

Greece

- Nikos Samaras (†)

Hungary

- Péter Nagy

Italy

- Matej Černič (Slovenia)

Netherlands

- Dick Kooy
- Wouter ter Maat

Serbia

- Novica Bjelica
- Konstantin Čupković
- Andrija Gerić
- Vladimir Grbić
- Dražen Luburić
- Ivan Miljković
- Miloš Nikić

Slovakia

- Lukáš Diviš (Russia)

Slovenia

- Alen Pajenk
- Alen Šket

Poland

- Dariusz Stanicki
- Fabian Drzyzga

Portugal

- Alexandre Ferreira

Ukraine

- Yuriy Gladyr

Non-European Players

Argentina

- Jerónimo Bidegain
- Lucas Chávez
- Santiago Darraidou
- Juan Pablo Porello
- Rodrigo Quiroga
- Camilo Sato

Brazil

- Luiz Felipe Fonteles
- Maicon França
- Thiago Soares Alves

Canada

- Nicholas Hoag
- Graham Vigrass

Cuba

- Ihosvany Hernández
- Salvador Hidalgo Oliva (Germany)
- Leonel Marshall

Iran

- Mahdi Jelveh Ghaziani
- Saeid Marouf
- Mohammad Mousavi
- Meisam Salehi

Nigeria

- Arinze Kelvin Nwachukwu

Tunisia

- Ismail Moalla

United States

- Brook Billings
- Gabriel Gardner
- Jeffrey Jendryk
- William McKenzie
- James Polster

Venezuela

- Ernardo Gómez

Players whose names are italicized still play for the team

== Sponsorship and kit manufacturers ==
Period	Kit sponsors
2004–2005	Anadolu Sigorta^{1} – Sırma^{2} – Franke^{4}
2005–2006	Genel Sigorta^{1} – Blue House ^{2} – Kosifler^{3} – Formart^{4}
2006–2007	İstikbal^{3} – Özsüt^{5}
2007–2008	yüzyıllarca.com^{1} – Alpet^{3}
2008–2009	Alpet^{3} – Pilsa^{5}
2009–2010	none
2010–2011	Kiğılı^{1}
2011–	Grundig^{1 2 3}

^{1} Main sponsorship ^{2} Back sponsorship ^{3} Lateral sponsorship ^{4} Short sponsorship ^{5} Sleeves sponsorship

Period	Kit manufacturers
2000–	Fenerium

== See also ==
- Fenerbahçe SK
- Fenerbahçe Women's Volleyball
