= Uğur Güneş =

Uğur Güneş may refer to:

- Uğur Güneş (volleyballer)
- Uğur Güneş (actor)
