= Ceyhun Tendar =

Turkish volleyball player (born 1987)

Personal information
- Full name: Zafer Ceyhun Tendar
- Born: April 14, 1987 (age 39); İzmir, Turkey
- Height: 1.87 m (6 ft 1 1/2 in)

Volleyball information
- Position: Setter
- Current club: (Turkey) Beşiktaş
- Number: 4

National team
2004	Turkey

Zafer Ceyhun Tendar (born April 14, 1987, in İzmir) is a Turkish volleyball player. He is currently a player of the Fenerbahçe Grundig. He also played three years for Arkas Spor, who is 1.87 m. tall. He is also a student at Ege University in the Sports Management department.
