= DEHA =

DEHA may refer to:

- DEHA (apparel), an Italian dancewear label
- Bis(2-ethylhexyl) adipate, a plasticizer
- Diethylhydroxylamine, another chemical also used in plastics

== See also ==
- Deha (disambiguation)
