= Ayberk Sevinç =

Turkish volleyball player (born 1988)

Ayberk Sevinç (born July 19, 1988 in Zonguldak) is a Turkish volleyball player. Sevinç is 191 cm and plays as libero. He has played for Fenerbahçe Men's Volleyball Team since 2004 and wears number 4. He played 48 times for the Turkish national team. He also played for Erdemir.
