= Siarhei Busel =

Belarusian volleyball player (born 1989)

Personal information
- Nationality: Belarusian
- Born: 30 May 1989 (age 37); Minsk
- Height: 6 ft 9 in (2.05 m)
- Weight: 190 lb (86 kg)
- Spike: 140 in (350 cm)
- Block: 132 in (335 cm)

Volleyball information
- Position: Middle blocker
- Current club: VC Yenisey Krasnoyarsk
- Number: 5

Career
Years	Teams
2009–2014; 2014–2015; 2015–2020; 2020–2021; 2021–2022; 2022; 2022–2023; 2023–	(Belarus) Stroitel Minsk (Russia) Prikamie Perm (Russia) NOVA Novokuybyshevsk (Russia) Dinamo LO (Belarus) Stroitel Minsk (Russia) Dinamo Moscow (Russia) NOVA Novokuybyshevsk (Russia) VC Yenisey Krasnoyarsk

Siarhei Busel (born 30 May 1989) is a Belarusian volleyball player, a member of the club VC Yenisey Krasnoyarsk.

== Sporting achievements ==
=== Clubs ===
Belarus Cup:

- 2009, 2010, 2012, 2013

Belarus Championship:

- 2010, 2011, 2012, 2013, 2014

=== National team ===
European League:

- 2019
