= Kadir Arslan =

Turkish volleyball player (born 1977)

Kadir Arslan (born April 20, 1977 in Ankara) is a Turkish volleyball player. He is 1.94m tall and plays as a passer.

Arslan has played for the Fenerbahçe Men's Volleyball team since the start of the 2007 season, and wears a number 7 jersey. He played 40 times for the national team. He also played for Arçelik, İstanbul Büyükşehir Belediyespor and Erdemir.
