= Ersin Durgut =

Turkish volleyball player

Personal information
- Born: 4 August 1982 (age 44); Istanbul, Turkey
- Height: 2.08 m (6 ft 10 in)

Volleyball information
- Position: Middle blocker
- Current club: (Turkey) Fenerbahçe Grundig
- Number: 2

National team
2007	Turkey
Honours
Men's Volleyball
Representing Erdemirspor
Turkish Men's Volleyball League
Gold medal – first place	2001-02 League	Team competition
Gold medal – first place	2003-04 League	Team competition
Gold medal – first place	2004-05 League	Team competition

Ersin Durgut (born 4 August 1982) is a Turkish volleyball player. He is 208 cm and plays as middle blocker. He plays for Fenerbahçe Grundig and wears 2 numbers. He played 25 times for national team. He also played for Erdemirspor and won 3 Turkish Men's Volleyball League. He also played Halkbank Ankara.

He capped 58 times for the Turkey national team.

== Honours and awards ==
- 2001-02 Turkish Men's Volleyball League Champion with Erdemirspor
- 2003-04 Turkish Men's Volleyball League Champion with Erdemirspor
- 2004-05 Turkish Men's Volleyball League Champion with Erdemirspor
- 2010-11 Turkish Men's Volleyball League Champion with Fenerbahçe
- 2011-12 Turkish Men's Volleyball League Champion with Fenerbahçe
- 2011-12 Turkish Volleyball Cup Champion with Fenerbahçe
- 2011-12 Turkish Volleyball Super Cup Champion with Fenerbahçe
