= Ahmet Toçoğlu =

Turkish volleyball player (born 1980)

Ahmet Toçoğlu (born 13 March 1980 in Sakarya) is a Turkish volleyball player of Fenerbahçe Grundig. He graduated as a Physical Education and Sports Teacher from Sakarya University. He plays as middle hitter and is 2.01 min in height. Since the 2007–08 season to 2011–12, he has played for Arkas Spor Izmir and wears the number 3. He has played 240 times for the national team as well as playing for Arçelik, Erdemirspor, Ziraat Bankası and Halk Bankası. CEV (Challenge Cup) Champions 2009
