= Özkan Hayırlı =

Turkish volleyball player (born 1984)

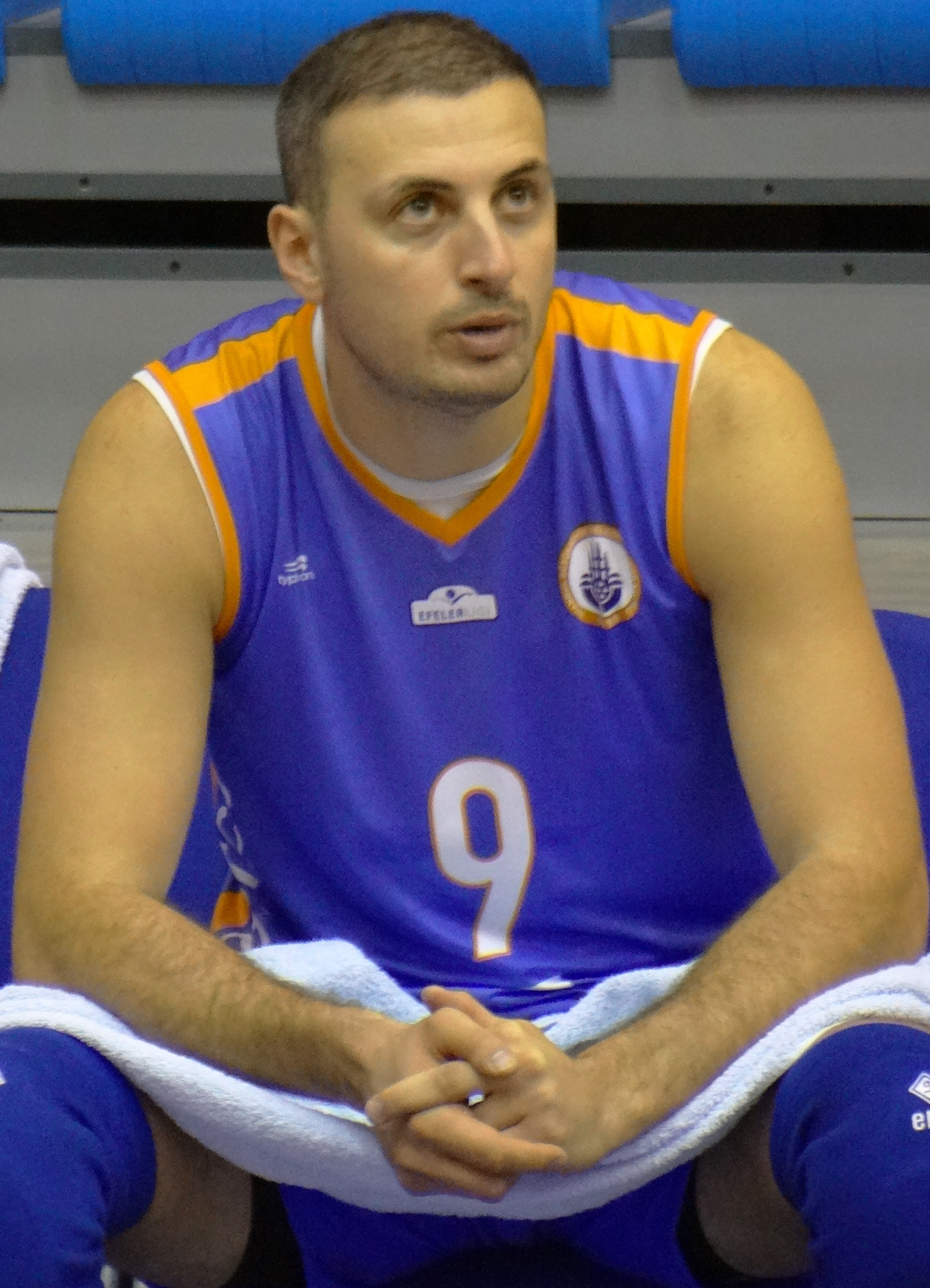

Personal information
- Full name: Özkan Hayırlı
- Born: May 27, 1984 (age 42) Istanbul, Turkey
- Height: 2.00 m (6 ft 6 1/2 in)

Volleyball information
- Position: Middle Blocker
- Current club: Fenerbahçe SK
- Number: 9

Career
- Years: Team
- 2009-present: Fenerbahçe SK

National team
- Years: Team
- 2000-present: Turkey
Honours
Men's volleyball
Representing Turkey
Universiade
Gold medal – first place	Izmir 2005	Team competition
Gold medal – first place	Bangkok 2007	Team competition
Representing Fenerbahçe SK
Balkan Cup
Gold medal – first place	Thessaloniki 2009	Team competition

Özkan Hayırlı (born May 27, 1984) is a Turkish volleyball player. He is 200 cm tall and plays as middle blocker. He has been playing for Fenerbahçe SK since 2009 and wears the number 1. He has played 85 times for the national team and also played for İstanbul B.Ş.Bld. He studied at Istanbul University.

He signed a contract on 27 June 2009.

== Honours and awards ==
- 2008–09 Turkish Men's Volleyball League Champion
- 2005 Summer Universiade Champion
- 2007 Summer Universiade Champion
- 2009–10 Balkan Cup Champion
