= Soner Mezgitçi =

Turkish volleyball player (born 1981)

Personal information
- Full name: Soner Mezgitçi
- Born: February 16, 1981 (age 45); Istanbul, Turkey
- Height: 1.97 m (6 ft 6 in)

Volleyball information
- Position: Opposite hitter
- Current club: Fenerbahçe Grundig
- Number: 9

National team
2003–2013	Turkey

Soner Mezgitçi (born February 16, 1981) is a Turkish former volleyball player. He is 197 cm and played as opposite hitter. He played for Fenerbahçe. He played over 100 games for the national team. He also played for Chenois from Switzerland and Calcit Kamnik from Slovenia.

He also played for Fenerbahçe in the 2002–03 season. He later played for Netas, Arçelik, Beşiktaş and Ziraatbankası, ending his career with Fenerbahçe in 2013.

== Honours and awards ==
- 2012–13 Turkish Men's Volleyball Super Cup with Champion Fenerbahçe
- 2011–12 Turkish Men's Volleyball League Champion with Fenerbahçe
- 2011–12 Turkish Men's Volleyball Cup Champion with Fenerbahçe
- 2011–12 Turkish Men's Volleyball Super Cup Champion with Fenerbahçe
- 2010–11 Turkish Men's Volleyball League Champion with Fenerbahçe
- 2005 Universiade Games Gold Medal Winner with National Team
- 2001–02 Turkish Men's Volleyball League Champion with Arcelik
- 2001–02 Turkish Volleyball Cup Champion with Arcelik
- 1999–2000 Turkish Men's Volleyball League Champion with Netas
- 1999–2000 Turkish Men's Volleyball Cup Champion with Netas
