= Barış Hamaz =

Turkish volleyball player (born 1976)

Barış Hamaz (born 29 March 1976 in Karabük) is a Turkish volleyball player. He is 200 cm. He plays for Fenerbahçe Men's Volleyball Team since 2007 season start and wears number 6. He played 15 times for national team. He also played for Erdemirspor, SSK.
