= Berat Kısal =

Turkish volleyball player (born 1986)

Berat Kısal (born March 21, 1986, in Istanbul) is a Turkish volleyball player. With a height of 192 cm, Kısal played for Fenerbahçe Men's Volleyball beginning in the 2003 season, where he wore shirt number 13. He has represented the national team in 10 games.
