= Furkan Yalçınkaya =

Turkish volleyball player (born 1986)

Personal information
- Full name: Furkan Yalçınkaya
- Born: August 12, 1986 (age 40); Istanbul, Turkey
- Height: 1.99 m (6 ft 6 in)
- Weight: 90 kg (200 lb)
- Spike: 350 cm (140 in)
- Block: 330 cm (130 in)

Volleyball information
- Position: Outside Hitter
- Current club: Fenerbahçe S.K.
- Number: 17
Honours
Men's volleyball
Representing Fenerbahçe SK
Balkan Cup
Gold medal – first place	Thessaloniki 2009	Team competition

Furkan Yalçınkaya (born August 12, 1986) is a Turkish volleyball player. He is 199 cm. He plays for Fenerbahçe S.K. since 2007 season start and has jersey number 17. He played 16 times for the Turkish national team. He also played for Arçelik and Manavgat Belediyespor.
