= Burak Hascan =

Turkish volleyball player (born 1978)

Burak Hascan (born June 1, 1978 in Istanbul) is a Turkish volleyball player. He is 200 cm tall and plays as middle player. He has been playing for Fenerbahçe since 2003 and wears number 10. He is the team's captain and has played over 100 times for the national team. He had also played for Netaş.
