= Erden Çevikel =

Turkish volleyball player (born 1992)

Personal information
- Full name: Rifat Erden Çevikel
- Born: 20 October 1992 (age 34); Zonguldak, Turkey
- Height: 1.96 m (6 ft 5 in)

Volleyball information
- Position: Setter
- Current club: Fenerbahçe Grundig
- Number: 7

Career
Years	Teams
2007-present	Fenerbahçe SK

National team
2007-present	Turkey
Honours
Men's volleyball
Representing Fenerbahçe SK
Turkish Volleyball League
Gold medal – first place	2009-10 League	Team competition
Silver medal – second place	2008-09 League	Team competition
Gold medal – first place	2007-08 League	Team competition
Turkish Cup
Gold medal – first place	2007-08 League	Team competition
Balkan Cup
Gold medal – first place	Thessaloniki 2009	Team competition

Rifat Erden Çevikel (born 20 October 1992 in Zonguldak) is a Turkish volleyball player. He is 196 cm and plays as setter. He has been playing for Fenerbahçe Grundig since 2007 and wears the number 7.

== Honours and awards ==
- 2007-08 Turkish Cup Champion with Fenerbahçe SK
- 2007-08 Turkish Men's Volleyball League Champion with Fenerbahçe SK
- 2008-09 CEV Champions League Top 16 with Fenerbahçe SK
- 2008-09 Turkish Men's Volleyball League runner-up with Fenerbahçe SK
- 2009-10 Balkan Cup Champion with Fenerbahçe SK
- 2009-10 Turkish Men's Volleyball League Champion with Fenerbahçe SK
- 2010-11 Turkish Men's Volleyball League Champion with Fenerbahçe SK
- 2011-12 Turkish Men's Volleyball League Champion with Fenerbahçe
- 2011-12 Turkish Volleyball Cup Champion with Fenerbahçe
- 2011-12 Turkish Volleyball Super Cup Champion with Fenerbahçe
