= Arslan Ekşi =

Turkish volleyball player

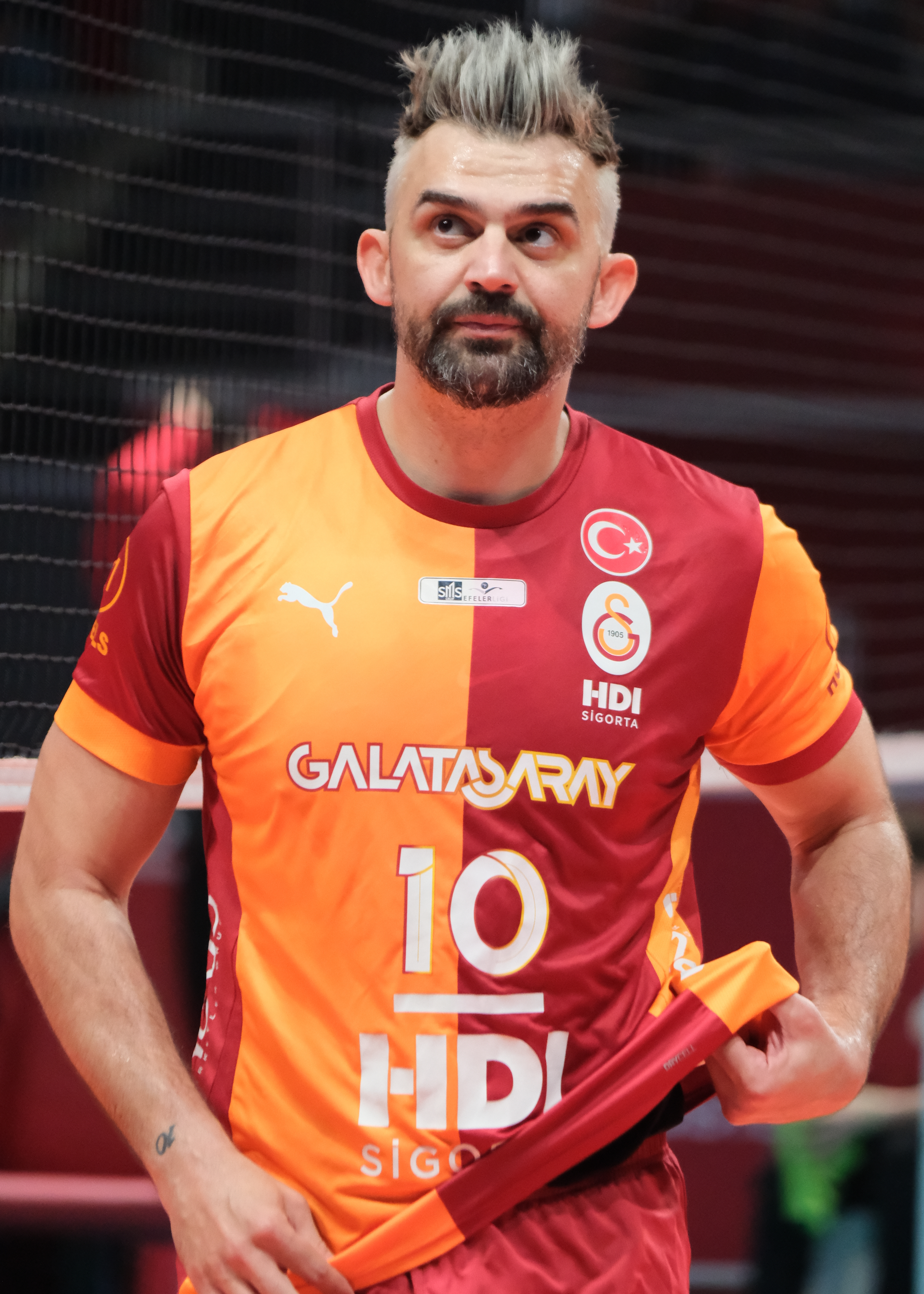

Personal information
- Born: 17 July 1985 (age 41) Istanbul, Turkey]
- Height: 1.98 m (6 ft 6 in)
- Weight: 90 kg (198 lb)
- Spike: 335 cm (132 in)
- Block: 322 cm (127 in)

Volleyball information
- Position: Setter
- Current club: İstanbul Gençlik Spor Kulübü

Career
- Years: Team
- 2001–2005 2005–2015 2015 2016–2017 2017–2018 2019 2019–2020 2020–2024 2024–2026 2026–: Arçelik; Fenerbahçe; VfB Friedrichshafen; İstanbul BBSK; Lokomotiv Novosibirsk; Halkbank; Spor Toto; Ziraat Bankası; Galatasaray; İstanbul Gençlik Spor Kulübü

National team
- Years: Team
- 2007–: Turkey
Honours
Men's volleyball
Representing Turkey
Universiade
| Gold medal – first place | Izmir 2005 | Team |

Arslan Ekşi (born 17 July 1985) is a Turkish volleyball player for İstanbul Gençlik Spor Kulübü who plays as setter.

He has been the team's captain. He has played 80 games for the national team and also played for Arçelik.

== Club career ==
On August 8, 2024, he signed a 2-year contract with Galatasaray.

On July 16, 2026, he signed a new one-year contract with Galatasaray.

== Honours and awards ==
=== Personal ===
- 2005 Best setter of the Turkish Men's Volleyball League
- 2007 Best setter of the Turkish Men's Volleyball League
- 2008 Best setter of the Turkish Men's Volleyball League
- 2009 Best setter of Balkan Cup
- 2010 Best setter of the Turkish Men's Volleyball League
- 2010 Best Turkish Player of the Turkish Men's Volleyball League
- 2011 Best setter of the Turkish Men's Volleyball League
- 2019 Most Valuable Player of Men's European Volleyball League

=== Club ===
- 2002–03 Turkish Men's Volleyball League Champion with Arçelik
- 2005 Summer Universiade Champion with Turkey
- 2005–06 Turkish Men's Volleyball League runner-up with Fenerbahçe SK
- 2007–08 Turkish Cup Champion with Fenerbahçe SK
- 2007–08 Turkish Men's Volleyball League Champion with Fenerbahçe SK
- 2008–09 Turkish Men's Volleyball League runner-up with Fenerbahçe SK
- 2008–09 CEV Champions League Top 16 with Fenerbahçe SK
- 2009–10 Balkan Cup Champion with Fenerbahçe SK
- 2009–10 Turkish Men's Volleyball League Champion with Fenerbahçe SK
- 2010–11 Turkish Volleyball Super Cup runner-up with Fenerbahçe
- 2010–11 Turkish Volleyball Cup runner-up with Fenerbahçe
- 2010–11 Turkish Men's Volleyball League Champion with Fenerbahçe SK
- 2011–12 Turkish Men's Volleyball League Champion with Fenerbahçe
- 2011–12 Turkish Volleyball Cup Champion with Fenerbahçe
- 2011–12 Turkish Volleyball Super Cup Champion with Fenerbahçe
- 2012–13 Turkish Volleyball Super Cup Champion with Fenerbahçe
- 2013–14 Balkan Cup Champion with Fenerbahçe SK
- 2013–14 Turkish Volleyball Cup runner-up with Fenerbahçe
- 2013–14 Turkish Men's Volleyball League runner-up with Fenerbahçe SK
- 2013–14 CEV Challenge Cup Champion with Fenerbahçe
- 2014–15 Turkish Volleyball Super Cup runner-up with Fenerbahçe
- 2020–21 Turkish Men's Volleyball League Champion with Ziraat Bankası
- 2021–22 Turkish Men's Volleyball League Champion with Ziraat Bankası
- 2022–23 Turkish Men's Volleyball League Champion with Ziraat Bankası
