= Deha Bozkan =

Turkish volleyball player (born 1989)

Deha Bozkan (born January 1, 1989, in Manisa) is a Turkish volleyball player. He is 181 cm. He plays for Fenerbahçe Men's Volleyball Team since 2005 and wear 2 number. He played 5 times for national team. He also played for Manisa Belediyespor and Salihli Belediyespor.
