= Hakkı Çapkınoğlu =

Turkish volleyball player (born 1990)

Personal information
- Nationality: Turkish
- Born: 20 July 1990 (age 36); Hopa, Artvin, Turkey
- Height: 2.00 m (6 ft 7 in)
- Weight: 75 kg (165 lb)
- Spike: 328 cm (129 in)
- Block: 315 cm (124 in)

Volleyball information
- Position: Middle blocker
- Current club: Fenerbahçe
- Number: 6

Career
Years
- 2010–2017
- 2017–2021
- 2021–2023
- 2023–2024
- 2024–
Teams
- Arkas Spor
- Halkbank
- Galatasaray
- Bursa Büyükşehir Belediyespor}
- Fenerbahçe

National team
| Turkey |

Hakkı Çapkınoğlu (born 20 July 1990) is a Turkish volleyball player for Fenerbahçe and the Turkish national team.

== Club career ==
On 26 April 2021, Galatasaray HDI Sigorta Men's Volleyball Team signed a 2-year contract with experienced Middle blocker Çapkınoğlu.

== National team career ==
He participated at the 2017 Men's European Volleyball Championship.
