= İzzet Ünver =

Turkish volleyball player (born 1992)

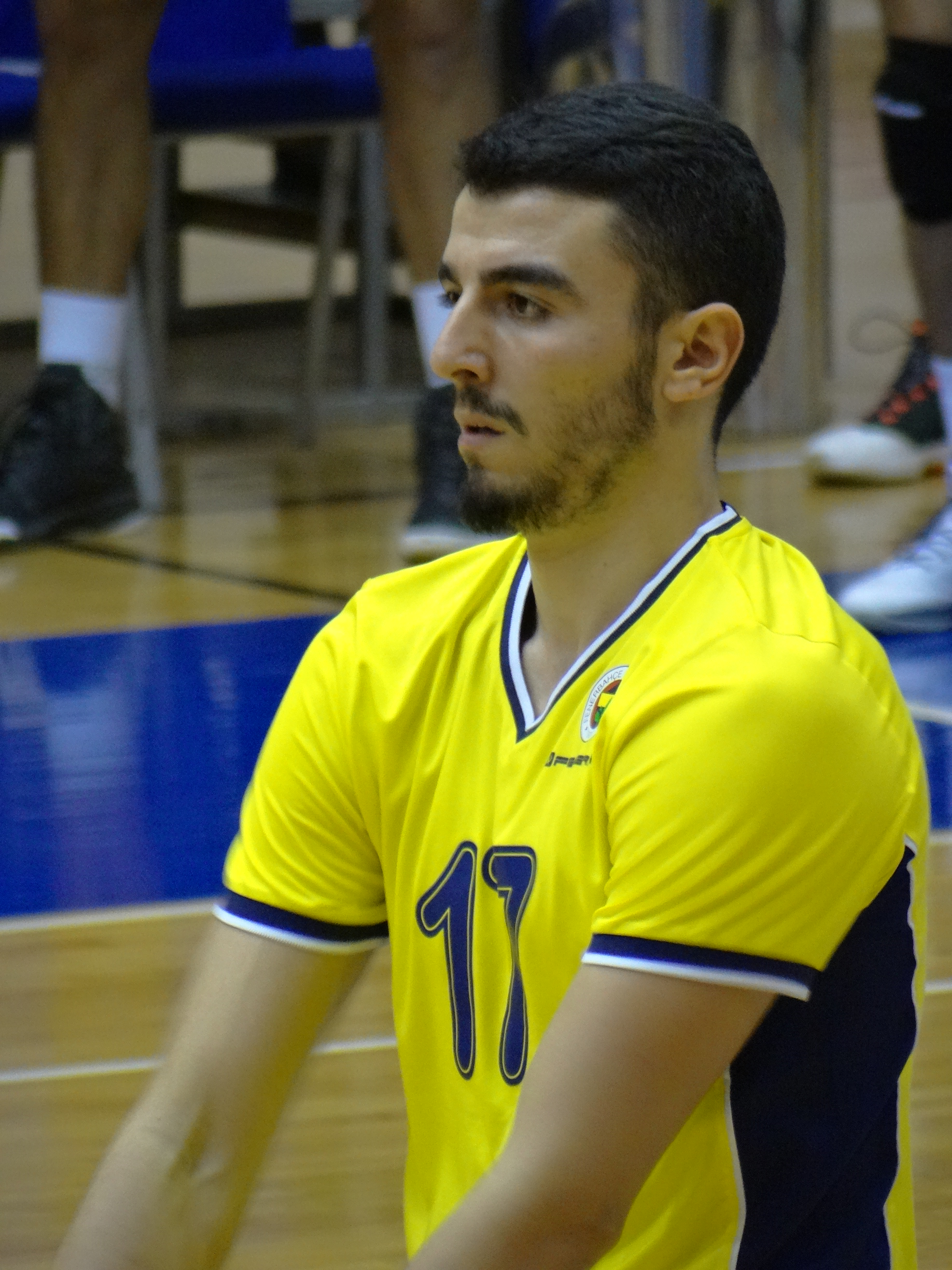

Personal information
- Nationality: Turkish
- Born: 1 January 1992 (age 34)
- Height: 1.95 m (6 ft 5 in)
- Weight: 87 kg (192 lb)
- Spike: 332 cm (131 in)
- Block: 319 cm (126 in)

Volleyball information
- Position: Outside spiker
- Current club: Maliye Milli Piyango

National team
- Years: Team
- Turkey
Honours
Men's volleyball
Representing Turkey
Islamic Solidarity Games
| Bronze medal – third place | 2021 Konya | Team |

İzzet Ünver (born 1 January 1992) is a Turkish volleyball player for Maliye Milli Piyango and the Turkish national team.

He plays as outside spiker. He participated at the 2017 Men's European Volleyball Championship.
