= Uğur Güneş (volleyballer) =

Turkish volleyball player (born 1993)

Personal information
- Full name: Uğur Güneş
- Born: August 11, 1993 (age 33) Karamürsel, Kocaeli, Turkey
- Height: 2.03 m (6 ft 8 in)

Volleyball information
- Position: Middle Blocker
- Current club: (Turkey) Fenerbahçe Grundig
- Number: 11

National team
- Years: Team
- 2007-present: Turkey
Honours
Men's volleyball
Representing Fenerbahçe SK
Turkish Volleyball League
Gold medal – first place	2007-08 League	Team competition
Silver medal – second place	2008-09 League	Team competition
Gold medal – first place	2009-10 League	Team competition
Gold medal – first place	2010-11 League	Team competition
Gold medal – first place	2011-12 League	Team competition
Silver medal – second place	2013-14 League	Team competition
Turkish Cup
Gold medal – first place	2007-08 League	Team competition
Silver medal – second place	2010-11 League	Team competition
Gold medal – first place	2011-12 League	Team competition
Silver medal – second place	2013-14 League	Team competition
Turkish Super Cup
Silver medal – second place	2010-11 League	Team competition
Gold medal – first place	2011-12 League	Team competition
Gold medal – first place	2012-13 League	Team competition
Silver medal – second place	2014-15 League	Team competition
Balkan Cup
Gold medal – first place	Thessaloniki 2009	Team competition
Gold medal – first place	Tirana 2013	Team competition
CEV Challenge Cup
Gold medal – first place	2013-14 League	Team competition

Uğur Güneş (born August 11, 1993 in Karamürsel, Kocaeli) is a Turkish volleyball player. He is 203 cm and plays as middle blocker. He has been playing for Fenerbahçe Grundig since 2007 and wears the number 11.

== Honours and awards ==
- 2007-08 Turkish Cup Champion with Fenerbahçe SK
- 2007-08 Turkish Men's Volleyball League Champion with Fenerbahçe SK
- 2008-09 Turkish Men's Volleyball League runner-up with Fenerbahçe SK
- 2008-09 CEV Champions League Top 16 with Fenerbahçe SK
- 2009-10 Balkan Cup Champion with Fenerbahçe SK
- 2009-10 Turkish Men's Volleyball League Champion with Fenerbahçe SK
- 2010-11 Turkish Volleyball Super Cup runner-up with Fenerbahçe
- 2010-11 Turkish Volleyball Cup runner-up with Fenerbahçe
- 2010-11 Turkish Men's Volleyball League Champion with Fenerbahçe SK
- 2011-12 Turkish Men's Volleyball League Champion with Fenerbahçe
- 2011-12 Turkish Volleyball Cup Champion with Fenerbahçe
- 2011-12 Turkish Volleyball Super Cup Champion with Fenerbahçe
- 2012-13 Turkish Volleyball Super Cup Champion with Fenerbahçe
- 2013-14 Balkan Cup Champion with Fenerbahçe SK
- 2013-14 Turkish Volleyball Cup runner-up with Fenerbahçe
- 2013-14 Turkish Men's Volleyball League runner-up with Fenerbahçe SK
- 2013-14 CEV Challenge Cup Champion with Fenerbahçe
- 2014-15 Turkish Volleyball Super Cup runner-up with Fenerbahçe
