= Ahmed Abdelaal =

Egyptian volleyball player (born 1989)

Personal information
- Nationality: Egyptian
- Born: 8 June 1989 (age 37) Asyut, Egypt

Sport
- Sport: Volleyball

Ahmed Abdelaal (born 8 June 1989) is an Egyptian volleyball player. He competed in the men's tournament at the 2016 Summer Olympics.
