= Veljko Basić =

Bosnian volleyball player and coach (born 1959)

Veljko Bašić
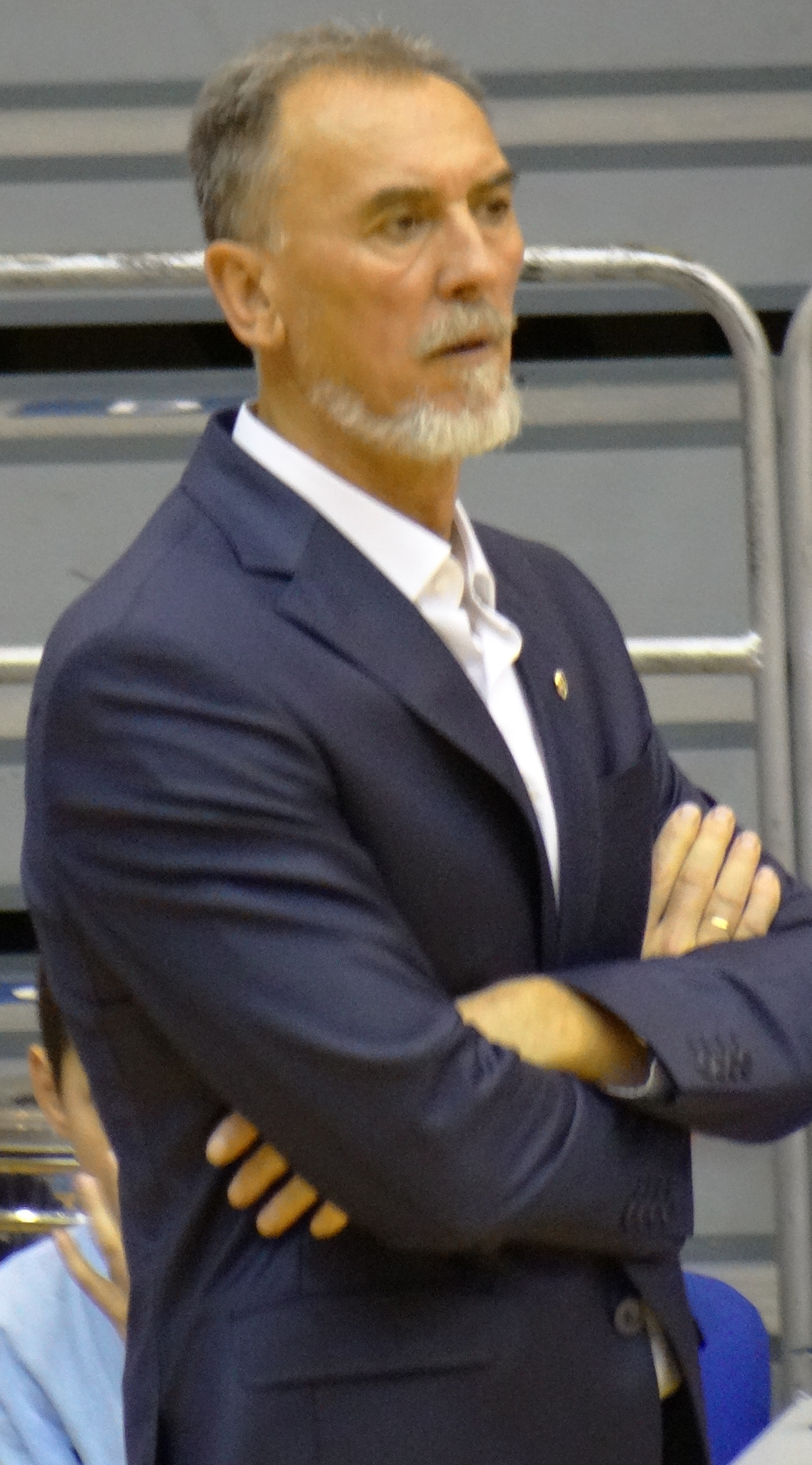

Personal information
- Nationality: Bosnia-Herzegovina
- Born: 3 October 1959 (age 67)
- Height: 190 cm (6 ft 3 in)

Veljko Bašić (born 3 October 1959) is a Bosnian former volleyball player and coach. He was the coach of the Turkey men's national volleyball team at the 2011 Men's European Volleyball Championship. In 2015 Technic manager of Fenerbahçe Men's Volleyball team. In France Bašić began his coaching career in Rennes, and also led Paris Volley and Tours, before he took over the men's national teams of Tunisia and Turkey. He was also coach of Tunisia champions Esperance of Tunis. He replaces Slobodan Boskan this year for his first season at the helm of Montenegro.
