= Rashad Atia =

Egyptian volleyball player (born 1986)

Personal information
- Nationality: Egyptian
- Born: 2 September 1986 (age 40)
- Height: 2.01 m (6 ft 7 in)
- Weight: 91 kg (201 lb)
- Spike: 348 cm (137 in)
- Block: 342 cm (135 in)

Volleyball information
- Number: 9

Career
- Years: Team
- 2014: (Egypt) Zamalek

National team
- Years: Team
- 2014: Egypt

Rashad Atia (born 2 September 1986) is an Egyptian male volleyball player. He was part of the Egypt men's national volleyball team at the 2014 FIVB Volleyball Men's World Championship in Poland. He played for Zamalek.

== Clubs ==
- Zamalek (2014)
