= Burutay Subaşı =

Turkish volleyball player (born 1990)

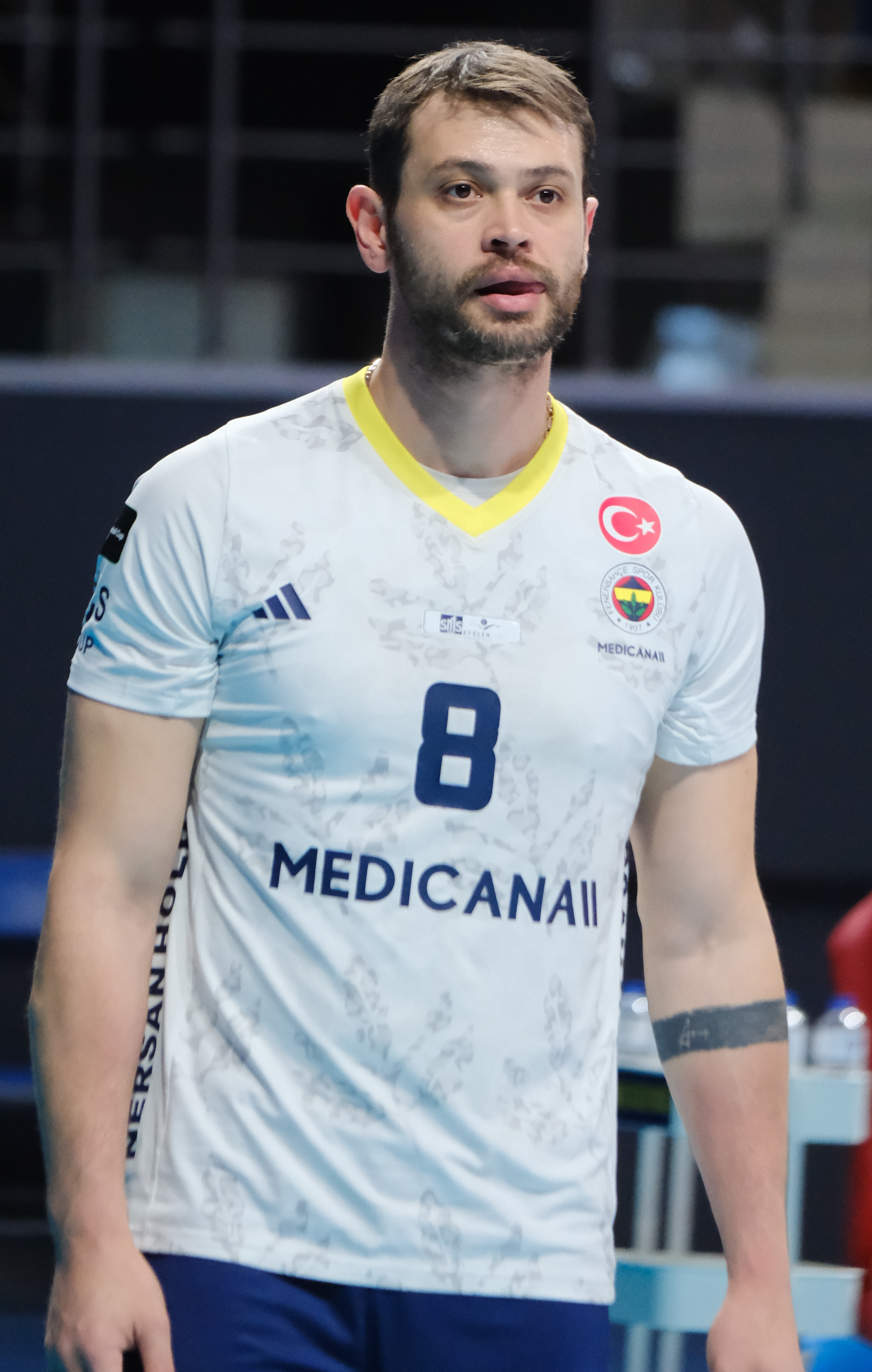

Personal information
- Full name: Burutay Subaşı
- Born: 15 July 1990 (age 36); Çanakkale, Turkey
- Height: 1.94 m (6 ft 4 in)
- Weight: 99 kg (218 lb)
- Spike: 352 cm (139 in)
- Block: 339 cm (133 in)

Volleyball information
- Position: Outside hitter / Libero
- Current club: Fenerbahçe
- Number: 8

Career
Years
- 2005–2006
- 2006–2013
- 2013–2019
- 2019–2022
- 2022–2025
- 2025–
Teams
- SGK Ankara
- Arkas Spor
- Halkbank
- Galatasaray
- Arkas Spor
- Fenerbahçe

National team
2013–	Turkey

Burutay Subaşı (born 15 July 1990) is a Turkish male volleyball player for Fenerbahçe and the Turkey national team.

== Career ==
Born in Çanakkale, Subaşı started playing volleyball at SSK Sports Club in 2001. He started his professional career with SGK Ankara in 2005-2006, wore the jerseys of Halkbank, Galatasaray HDI Sigorta and Arkas Spor.

He received the ‘Best Serving Player’ and ‘Best Scorer’ awards in the 2022-2023 Turkish Cup, was selected as the MVP of the Turkish Super Cup in 2018-2019 and 2019-2020.

== National team career ==
He is part of the Turkey men's national volleyball team.

== Awards ==
=== Clubs ===
Arkas Spor (2006–2013)

- CEV Challenge Cup: 2008–09 2010–11
- Turkish League: 2007, 2013 2011, 2012
- Turkish Cup: 2009, 2011 2013

Halkbank (2013–2019)

- CEV Champions League: 2013–14
- Turkish League: 2014, 2016, 2017, 2018 2015
- Turkish Cup: 2014, 2015, 2016, 2018 2017
- Turkish Super Cup: 2013, 2014, 2015, 2018

Galatasaray (2019–2022)

- Turkish Cup: 2022

Arkas Spor (2022–2025)

- CEV Cup: 2023–24
- BVA Cup: 2024
- Turkish Cup: 2024
- Turkish Super Cup: 2024
