= Yiğit Gülmezoğlu =

Turkish volleyball player (born 1995)

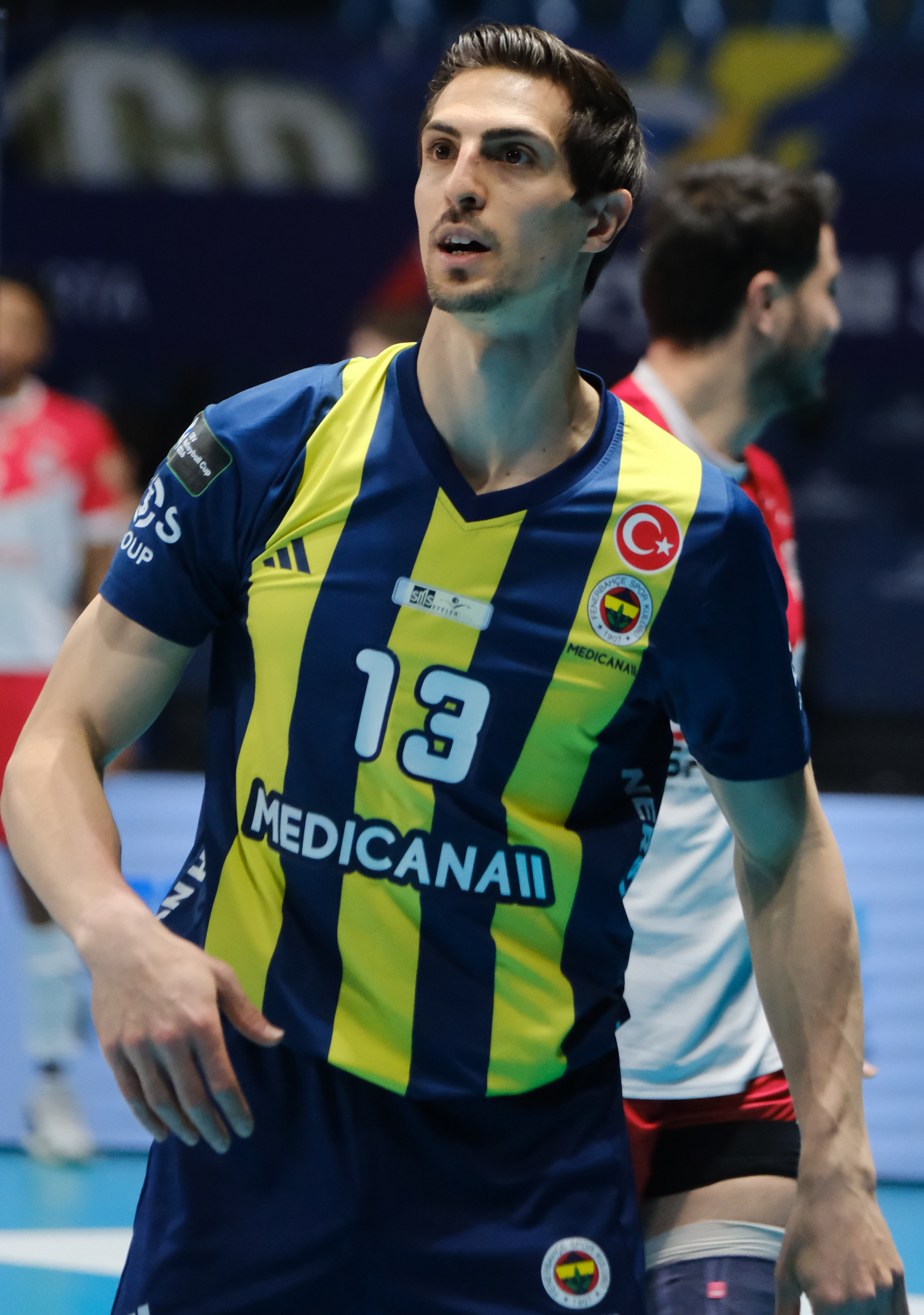

Personal information
- Nationality: Turkish
- Born: 28 December 1995 (age 30) İzmir, Turkey
- Height: 194 cm (6 ft 4 in)
- Weight: 81 kg (179 lb)
- Spike: 355 cm (140 in)
- Block: 320 cm (126 in)

Volleyball information
- Current club: Fenerbahçe
- Number: 11 (national team) 13 (club)

Career
- Years: Team
- 2014: Arkas İzmir

National team
- Years: Team
- 2013–: Turkey

Yiğit Gülmezoğlu (born 28 December 1995) is a Turkish male volleyball player. He is part of the Turkey men's national volleyball team. On club level he plays for Fenerbahçe.
