= Emre Batur =

Turkish volleyball player

Personal information
- Nationality: Turkish
- Born: 21 April 1988 (age 38); Tokat, Turkey
- Height: 2.01 m (6 ft 7 in)
- Weight: 95 kg (209 lb)
- Spike: 338 cm (133 in)
- Block: 325 cm (128 in)

Volleyball information
- Position: Middle blocker
- Current club: Fenerbahçe Grundig
- Number: 10

Career
Years	Teams
2005–2012; 2012–2018; 2018-	Tokat Plevne Belediyesi; Fenerbahçe Grundig; Halkbank Ankara; Fenerbahçe Grundig

National team
2007–	Turkey
Honours
Men's volleyball
Representing Turkey
European League
Silver medal – second place	2012 Ankara
Bronze medal – third place	2010 Guadalajara
- Last updated: 31 October 2014

Emre Batur (born 21 April 1988) is a Turkish professional volleyball player. He played for Fenerbahçe Grundig since 2005 before he transferred to Halkbank Ankara in the 2012-13 season. He played 25 times for national team. He also played for Tokat Plevne Belediyesi.

He won the bronze medal at the 2010 Men's European Volleyball League and the silver medal at the 2012 Men's European Volleyball League with the national team. He was awarded the title "Most Valuable Player" at the 2012 European League. Batur won the Men's CEV Cup 2012–13 with Halkbank Ankara.

== Awards ==
=== Individual ===
- 2010 Turkish Men's Volleyball League - "Best Server"
- 2011 Turkish Men's Volleyball League - "Best Blocker"
- 2012 European League - "Most Valuable Player"
- 2013 Turkish Men's Volleyball League - "Payidar Demir Special Award"

=== National team ===
- 2010 European League - Bronze Medal
- 2012 European League - Silver Medal

=== Clubs ===
Fenerbahçe SK

- 2005-06 Turkish Men's Volleyball League - Runner-up
- 2007-08 Turkish Cup - Champion
- 2007-08 Turkish Men's Volleyball League - Champion
- 2008-09 Turkish Men's Volleyball League - Runner-up
- 2008-09 CEV Champions League Top 16
- 2009-10 Balkan Cup - Champion
- 2009-10 Turkish Men's Volleyball League - Champion
- 2010-11 Turkish Men's Volleyball League - Champion
- 2011-12 Turkish Men's Volleyball League - Champion
- 2011-12 Turkish Volleyball Cup - Champion
- 2011-12 Turkish Volleyball Super Cup - Champion
- 2018-19 Turkish Volleyball Cup - Champion
- 2018-19 Turkish Men's Volleyball League - Champion

Halkbank Ankara

- 2013 CEV Cup - Champion
- 2014/2015 Turkish Championship, with Halkbank Ankara
- 2012/2013 Turkish SuperCup 2013, with Halkbank Ankara
- 2013/2014 Turkish SuperCup 2014, with Halkbank Ankara
- 2014/2015 Turkish SuperCup 2015, with Halkbank Ankara
- 2015/2016 Turkish Championship, with Halkbank Ankara
- 2016/2017 Turkish Championship, with Halkbank Ankara
- 2012-13 Turkish Volleyball Cup - Champion
- 2013-14 Turkish Volleyball Cup - Champion
- 2014-15 Turkish Volleyball Cup - Champion
