= Volleyball at the 2005 Summer Universiade =

Volleyball events were contested at the 2005 Summer Universiade in İzmir, Turkey.

| Event | Gold | Silver | Bronze |
|---|---|---|---|
| Men's volleyball | Turkey (TUR) | Japan (JPN) | Italy (ITA) |
| Women's volleyball | Chinese Taipei (TPE) | Poland (POL) | China (CHN) |
