= Ramazan Serkan Kılıç =

Turkish volleyball player (born 1984)

Serkan Kılıç

Personal information
- Full name: Ramazan Serkan Kılıç
- Born: May 31, 1984 (age 42); Ankara, Turkey
- Height: 1.87 m (6 ft 1 1/2 in)

Volleyball information
- Position: Libero
- Current club: (Turkey) Fenerbahçe Grundig
- Number: 18

National team
2007-present	Turkey
Honours
Men's volleyball
Representing Fenerbahçe SK
Turkish Volleyball League
Silver medal – second place	2008-09 League	Team competition
Gold medal – first place	2009-10 League	Team competition
Turkish Cup
Gold medal – first place	2007-08 League	Team competition
Balkan Cup
Gold medal – first place	Thessaloniki 2009	Team competition

Ramazan Serkan Kılıç (born May 31, 1984, in Ankara) is a Turkish volleyball player. He is 187 cm and plays as libero. He has been playing for Fenerbahçe Grundig since 2008 and wears the number 18. He played 63 times for the national team and also played for SGK and Hatay Polis Gücü.

== Honours and awards ==
- 2007–08 Turkish Men's Volleyball League Champion
- 2008–09 Turkish Men's Volleyball League runner-up
- 2008–09 Turkish Cup Champion
- 2009–10 Balkan Champion
- 2009–10 Turkish Men's Volleyball League Champion
- 2010–11 Turkish Men's Volleyball League Champion
- 2011–12 Turkish Men's Volleyball League Champion
- 2011–12 Turkish Cup Champion
- 2011–12 Turkish Super Cup Champion
- 2013–14 CEV Challenge Cup Champion
