= Turkish Men's Volleyball Cup =

National cup competition for professional men's volleyball teams in Turkey

Turkish Men's Volleyball Cup Kupa Voley Erkekler
- Current season, competition or edition: 2025 Turkish Men's Volleyball Cup
- Sport: Volleyball
- Founded: 1988
- No. of teams: 16
- Country: Turkey
- Confederation: (Europe) CEV
- Most recent champion: Ziraat Bankası (2)
- Most titles: Halkbank (9 titles)
- Domestic cups: Turkish Volleyball League; Turkish SuperCup
- Website: www.voleybol.org.tr

Turkish Men's Volleyball Cup (Turkish: Kupa Voley Erkekler) is a national cup competition for professional men's volleyball teams in Turkey, organised by the Turkish Volleyball Federation since the 1988–89 season. Between 2003 and 2007, the tournament was not held for four consecutive seasons.

The most successful team of the competition are Halkbank with seven titles. The current champions are Arkas, who won their 3rd title by defeating rivals Galatasaray 3–2 in the 2022 final.

== Performance by club ==
Club	Titles
Halkbank	9
Fenerbahçe	5
Netaş	4
Arkas	3
Eczacıbaşı	3
Arçelik	2
SSK	2
Ziraat Bankası	2
Spor Toto	1
Sönmez Filamentspor	1

== Champions ==
Season	Champions
1988–89	Sönmez Filamentspor
1989–90	Eczacıbaşı
1990–91	Eczacıbaşı
1991–92	Halkbank
1992–93	Halkbank
1993–94	Netaş
1994–95	Eczacıbaşı
1995–96	Halkbank
1996–97	Netaş
1997–98	Netaş
1998–99	Netaş
1999–00	Arçelik
2000–01	Arçelik
2001–02	SSK
2002–03	SSK
2003–04	not held
2004–05	not held
2005–06	not held
2006–07	not held
2007–08	Fenerbahçe
2008–09	Arkas
2009–10	Ziraat Bankası
2010–11	Arkas
2011–12	Fenerbahçe
2012–13	Halkbank
2013–14	Halkbank
2014–15	Halkbank
2015–16	not held
2016–17	Fenerbahçe
2017–18	Halkbank
2018–19	Fenerbahçe
2019–20	not completed
2020–21	Spor Toto
2021–22	Arkas
2022--23	Halkbank
2023--24	Halkbank
2024–25	Fenerbahçe
2025–26	Ziraat Bankası

== See also ==
  - Men's
- Turkish Men's Volleyball League
- Turkish Men's Volleyball Cup
- Turkish Men's Volleyball Super Cup
  - Women's
- Turkish Women's Volleyball League
- Turkish Women's Volleyball Cup
- Turkish Women's Volleyball Super Cup
