= Metin Toy =

Turkish volleyball player (born 1994)

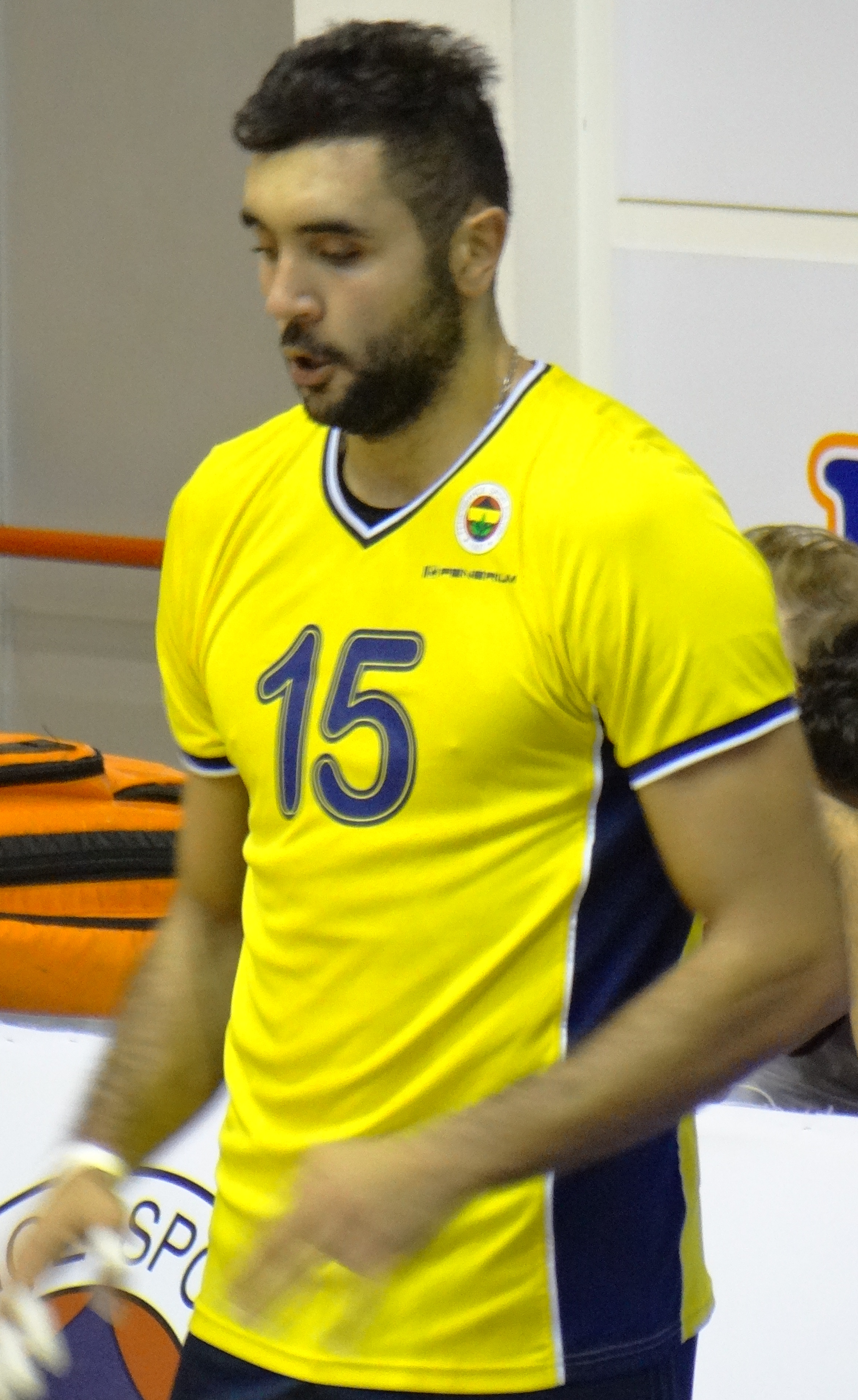

Personal information
- Nationality: Turkish
- Born: 3 May 1994 (age 32) Kütahya, Turkey
- Height: 2.01 m (6 ft 7 in)
- Weight: 100 kg (220 lb)
- Spike: 358 cm (141 in)
- Block: 345 cm (136 in)

Volleyball information
- Position: Opposite
- Current club: Fenerbahçe
- Number: 15

Career
- Years: Team
- 2015–: Fenerbahçe

National team
- Years: Team
- 2015–: Turkey

Metin Toy (born 3 May 1994) is a Turkish male volleyball player. He is part of the Turkey men's national volleyball team. On club level he plays for Fenerbahçe.
