= 2014–15 Turkish Men's Volleyball League =

- League: Turkish Men's Volleyball League
- Sport: Volleyball
- Games: 132 (Regular season)
- Teams: 12

Regular season
- Season champions: Halkbank

Finals
- Champions: Arkas
- Runners-up: Halkbank

Turkish Men's Volleyball League seasons
- ← 2013–14 2015–16 →

The 2014–15 Turkish Men's Volleyball League was the 45th edition of the top-flight professional men's volleyball league in Turkey.

== Regular season ==
=== League table ===
Pos	Team	Pld	W	L	SF	SA	Pts	Qualification
1	Halkbank	22	22	0	66	11	65	Playoffs
2	Arkas	22	18	4	58	21	53	Playoffs
3	Ziraat Bankası	22	16	6	52	33	45	Playoffs
4	Fenerbahçe Grundig	22	14	8	52	34	42	Playoffs
5	Galatasaray FXTCR	22	13	9	47	43	35	Playoffs
6	İstanbul BB	22	12	10	47	44	34	Playoffs
7	Maliye Piyango	22	10	12	43	45	31	Playoffs
8	Beşiktaş	22	9	13	40	45	31	Playoffs
9	Şahinbey	22	6	16	37	54	21	Play-out
10	Palandöken	22	5	17	18	56	15	Play-out
11	İnegöl	22	3	19	26	60	14	Play-out
12	Gençlik	22	4	18	22	62	10	Play-out

Source: Turkish Volleyball Federation

== Play-out ==
Pos	Team	Pld	W	L	SF	SA	Pts	Relegation
1	Şahinbey	28	10	18	50	65	32	
2	İnegöl	28	8	20	43	66	31	
3	Palandöken	28	8	20	31	67	25	Relegation to Turkish Women Volleyball Second League
4	Gençlik	28	4	24	25	80	10	Relegation to Turkish Women Volleyball Second League

== Playoffs ==
Team 1	Agg.	Team 2	Game 1	Game 2	Game 3
Halkbank (1)	2–0	Beşiktaş (8)	3–1	3–1	
Arkas (2)	2–1	Maliye Piyango (7)	3–0	2–3	3–0
Ziraat Bankası (3)	2–1	İstanbul BB (6)	2–3	3–0	3–2
Fenerbahçe Grundig (4)	1–2	Galatasaray FXTCR (5)	1–3	3–0	1–3

== Classification group ==
Pos	Team	Pld	W	L	SF	SA	Pts	IBB	BEŞ	MAL	FEN
5	İstanbul BB	6	5	1	17	8	15		3–1	3–2	3–1
6	Beşiktaş	6	4	2	13	10	11	0–3		3–1	3–0
7	Maliye Piyango	6	2	4	13	15	8	3–2	2–3		2–3
8	Fenerbahçe Grundig	6	1	5	7	17	2	1–3	1–3	1–3	

== Final group ==
Pos	Team	Pld	W	L	SF	SA	Pts	ARK	HAL	ZIR	GAL
1	Arkas	6	5	1	17	7	15		3–0	3–2	3–0
2	Halkbank	6	4	2	13	7	12	1–3		3–0	3–1
3	Ziraat Bankası	6	3	3	11	12	9	3–2	0–3		3–1
4	Galatasaray FXTCR	6	0	6	3	18	0	1–3	0–3	0–3	

Turkish Men's Volleyball League
2014–15 champions

Fourth title
