= Turkish Men's Volleyball Super Cup =

Turkish Men's Volleyball Super Cup Türkiye Voleybol Erkekler Şampiyonlar Kupası
- Current season, competition or edition: 2025 Turkish Men's Volleyball Super Cup
- Sport: Volleyball
- Founded: 2009
- No. of teams: 2
- Country: Turkey
- Confederation: (Europe) CEV
- Most recent champion: Galatasaray (2 nd title)
- Most titles: Ziraat Bank (5 titles)
- Related competitions: Turkish Volleyball League; Turkish Volleyball Cup
- Website: www.tvf.org.tr

The Turkish Men's Volleyball Super Cup (Turkish: Türkiye Voleybol Erkekler Şampiyonlar Kupası) is the super cup competition for men's volleyball clubs in Turkey, organized by the Turkish Volleyball Federation since 2009. It is contested between the winners of the Turkish Volleyball League and the Turkish Cup.

The most successful teams of the competition are Fenerbahçe, Halkbank and the Ziraat Bank volleyball team, with four titles each.

== Finals ==
| Year | Winners | Result | Runners-up | Reference |
|---|---|---|---|---|
| 2009 | İstanbul BBSK | 3–1 | Arkas | |
| 2010 | Ziraat Bankası | 3–1 | Fenerbahçe | |
| 2011 | Fenerbahçe Grundig | 3–0 | Arkas | |
| 2012 | Fenerbahçe Grundig | 3–0 | Galatasaray | |
| 2013 | Halkbank | 3–0 | Arkas | |
| 2014 | Halkbank | 3–1 | Fenerbahçe | |
| 2015 | Halkbank | 3–0 | Arkas | |
| 2016 | Not held | | | |
| 2017 | Fenerbahçe | 3–1 | Halkbank | |
| 2018 | Halkbank | 3–2 | Maliye Piyango | |
| 2019 | Galatasaray | 3–2 | Fenerbahçe | |
| 2020 | Fenerbahçe | 3–1 | Arkas | |
| 2021 | Ziraat Bankası | 3–2 | Spor Toto | |
| 2022 | Ziraat Bankası | 3–0 | Arkas | |
| 2023 | Ziraat Bankası | 3–1 | Halkbank | |
| 2024 | Arkas Spor | 3–0 | Halkbank | |
| 2025 | Ziraat Bankası | 3–1 | Fenerbahçe | |
| 2026 | Galatasaray | 3–1 | Ziraat Bankası | |

== Performance by club ==
| Club | Winners | Runners-up | Years won |
|---|---|---|---|
| Ziraat Bank | 5 | 3 | 2010, 2021, 2022, 2023, 2025 |
| Halkbank | 4 | 2 | 2013, 2014, 2015, 2018 |
| Fenerbahçe | 4 | 4 | 2011, 2012, 2017, 2020 |
| Galatasaray | 2 | 1 | 2019, 2026 |
| Arkas | 1 | 5 | 2024 |
| İstanbul BBSK | 1 | – | 2009 |
| Maliye Piyango | – | 1 | |
| Spor Toto | – | 1 | |

== See also ==
  - Men's
- Turkish Men's Volleyball League
- Turkish Men's Volleyball Cup
- Turkish Men's Volleyball Super Cup
  - Women's
- Turkish Women's Volleyball League
- Turkish Women's Volleyball Cup
- Turkish Women's Volleyball Super Cup
