= 2016–17 Turkish Men's Volleyball League =

- League: Turkish Men's Volleyball League
- Sport: Volleyball
- Games: 132 (Regular Season)
- Teams: 12

Regular Season

Finals

Turkish Men's Volleyball League seasons
- ← 2015–16 2017–18 →

The 2016–17 Turkish Men's Volleyball League is the 47th edition of the top-flight professional men's volleyball league in Turkey.

== Regular season ==
=== League table ===
Pos	Club	Pld	W	L	SW	SL	PAYP	Pts
1	Fenerbahçe	22	18	4	56	30	1.770	51.770
2	Halkbank	22	16	6	55	30	2.310	49.310
3	Ziraat Bankası	22	16	6	52	31	2.250	48.250
4	Arkas	22	14	8	51	32	2.200	46.200
5	Maliye Piyango	22	13	9	52	33	1.390	45.390
6	İnegöl Belediyespor	22	11	11	49	38	1.260	40.260
7	Galatasaray	22	12	10	45	44	2.230	35.230
8	İBB	22	11	11	43	44	2.290	32.290
9	Beşiktaş	22	7	15	30	50	2.220	23.220
10	Afyonkarahisar Belediyespor	22	8	14	30	51	0.150	23.150
11	Tokat Belediye Plevnespor	22	6	16	34	56	0.480	18.480
12	Msk Urfa	22	0	22	8	66	0.075	1.075

Playoffs
Play out

Source: Turkish Volleyball Federation

Updated: 15 April 2016

=== Results ===
Home \ Away	AFY	ARK	BEŞ	FEN	GAL	HAL	İBB	İNE	MAL	URF	TOK	ZİR
Afyonkarahisar Belediyespor		0–3	2–3	1–3	0–3	3–2	2–3	3–2	0–3	3–0	3–1	0–3
Arkas	3–1		3–0	0–3	3–1	3–1	1–3	3–1	3–1	3–0	1–3	2–3
Beşiktaş	3–0	0–3		1–3	3–1	1–3	3–0	0–3	1–3	3–0	2–3	1–3
Fenerbahçe	2–3	0–3	3–1		3–0	3–1	3–1	3–2	3–2	3–0	3–0	3–0
Galatasaray	3–0	3–2	3–1	1–3		0–3	3–1	3–2	3–2	3–0	2–3	1–3
Halkbank	3–0	3–1	3–0	3–0	3–2		3–1	3–0	3–2	3–1	3–0	3–1
İBB	1–3	1–3	3–0	1–3	2–3	3–2		1–3	3–2	3–0	3–1	1–3
İnegöl Belediyespor	3–0	1–3	3–1	2–3	2–3	3–0	2–3		3–1	3–0	3–1	3–0
Maliye Piyango	3–0	3–1	3–0	3–0	3–0	3–1	1–3	0–3		3–0	3–1	3–0
Msk Urfa	0–3	0–3	1–3	1–3	1–3	0–3	0–3	1–3	1–3		2–3	0–3
Tokat Belediye Plevnespor	1–3	1–3	1–3	2–3	1–3	2–3	0–3	3–1	1–3	3–0		2–3
Ziraat Bankası	3–0	3–1	3–0	2–3	3–1	1–3	3–0	3–1	3–2	3–0	3–1	

Updated to match(es) played on 15 April 2017. Source: TMVL Fixtures
Legend: Blue = home team win; Yellow = draw; Red = away team win.

== Play-Out ==
Pos	Club	Pld	W	L	SW	SL	Pts
9	Afyonkarahisar Belediyespor	28	14	14	48	56	40.150
10	Beşiktaş	28	11	17	45	57	36.220
11	Tokat Belediye Plevnespor	28	8	20	42	70	23.480
12	Msk Urfa	28	0	28	11	84	2.075

Relegation to Turkish Men Volleyball Second League

Home \ Away	AFY	BEŞ	TOK	URF
Afyonkarahisar Belediyespor		3–1	3–1	3–1
Beşiktaş	2–3		3–0	3–0
Tokat Belediye Plevnespor	0–3	1–3		3–0
Msk Urfa	0–3	0–3	2–3	

Legend: Blue = home team win; Yellow = draw; Red = away team win.

== Playoffs ==
The eight teams that finished in the places 1 to 8 in the Regular season, compete in the Play-off (1-8).

Quarterfinals
1	Fenerbahçe	3	3
8	İstanbul Büyükşehir Belediye	1	1
4	Arkas	3	3
5	Maliye Piyango	2	1
2	Halkbank	3	3
7	Galatasaray	2	1
3	Ziraat Bankası	3	3
6	İnegöl Belediyespor	1	0

Semifinals
1	Fenerbahçe	1	3	1
4	Arkas	3	2	3
2	Halkbank	2	3	3
3	Ziraat Bankası	3	0	1

Final
4	Arkas
2	Halkbank
Third place
1	Fenerbahçe
3	Ziraat Bankası

== Playoffs 5-8 ==
The fourth teams loser in the Play-off (1-8).

Quarterfinals
1	Fenerbahçe	3	3
8	İBB	1	1
4	Arkas	3	3
5	Maliye Piyango	2	1
2	Halkbank	3	3
7	Galatasaray	2	1
3	Ziraat Bankası	3	3
6	İnegöl Belediyespor	1	0

5-8
5	Maliye Piyango	3	0	3
8	İstanbul Büyükşehir Belediye	2	3	0
6	İnegöl Belediyespor	3	3
7	Galatasaray	0	1

5/6
5	Maliye Piyango
6	İnegöl Belediyespor
7/8
8	İstanbul Büyükşehir Belediye
7	Galatasaray
