= 2013–14 Turkish Men's Volleyball League =

- League: Turkish Men's Volleyball League
- Sport: Volleyball
- Games: 132 (Regular Season)
- Teams: 12

Regular Season
- Season champions: Fenerbahçe Grundig

Finals
- Champions: Halkbank
- Runners-up: Fenerbahçe Grundig

Turkish Men's Volleyball League seasons
- ← 2012–13 2014–15 →

The 2013-14 Turkish Men's Volleyball League was the 44th edition of the top-flight professional men's volleyball league in Turkey.

== Regular season ==
=== League table ===
Pos	Club	Pld	W	L	SW	SL	Pts
1	Fenerbahçe Grundig	22	20	2	62	17	58
2	Halkbank	22	19	3	62	14	58
3	İstanbul BB	22	17	5	54	23	51
4	Arkas	22	16	6	54	26	46
5	Galatasaray FXTCR	22	13	19	44	39	36
6	Maliye Piyango	22	11	11	43	41	36
7	Ziraat Bankası	22	9	13	42	45	30
8	Gençlik	22	8	14	37	51	26
9	Konak	22	8	14	33	52	22
10	İnegöl	22	5	17	27	58	15
11	Belediye Plevne	22	5	17	18	56	14
12	Anka	22	1	21	10	64	4

Playoffs
Play out

Source: Turkish Volleyball Federation

== Play-out ==
Pos	Club	Pld	W	L	SW	SL	Pts
1	İnegöl	6	4	2	15	11	8
2	Konak	6	4	2	14	11	8
3	Belediye Plevne	6	2	4	11	13	4
4	Anka	6	2	4	11	16	4

Relegation to Turkish Men Volleyball Second League

== Playoffs ==
Quarterfinals
1	Fenerbahçe Grundig	2
8	Gençlik	0
4	Arkas	2
5	Galatasaray FXTCR	0
2	Halkbank	2
7	Ziraat Bankası	0
3	İstanbul BB	2
6	Maliye Piyango	1

Semifinals
1	Fenerbahçe Grundig	2
4	Arkas	0
2	Halkbank	2
3	İstanbul BB	0

Finals
1	Fenerbahçe Grundig	1
2	Halkbank	3

Turkish Men's Volleyball League
2013–14 Champions
Halkbank
Sixth Title
