= 2026–27 Turkish Men's Volleyball League =

- League: Turkish Men's Volleyball League
- Sport: Volleyball
- Duration: October 2026 – April 2027
- Teams: 14

Turkish Men's Volleyball League seasons
- ← 2025–26 2027–28 →

The 2026–27 Turkish Men's Volleyball League, branded as the 2026–27 Efeler League (Turkish: 2026–27 Efeler Ligi), was the 57th edition of the top-level Men's volleyball league in Turkey. The competition was organised by the Turkish Volleyball Federation

In a statement made by the federation on June 3, 2026, it was stated that the participation fee for the Efeler League was 350,000 TL. The application deadline for participation set as July 10, 2026.

In the 2026–27 season, teams will be allowed to have a maximum of 6 foreign players in their 14-person match squad and a maximum of 5 foreign players on the field at the same time.

The fixtures were released on 13 August 2026. Bursa Belediye Spor, which had the right to participate in the league, transferred its rights to Sultanbeyli Belediyespor.

== Teams ==
Fourteen teams competed in the league stage. The league includes 5 teams from Istanbul, 3 from Ankara, and 1 each from Antalya, Çorum, Gaziantep, Kahramanmaraş, Kocaeli, and İzmir.

Club	Head Coach	Captain	City
Alanya Belediyespor	(Turkey) Serkan Oğuz		Antalya
Altekma			İzmir
Fenerbahçe			Istanbul
Galatasaray			Istanbul
Gaziantep Gençlik			Gaziantep
Gebze Belediyespor	(Turkey) Fikret Ayan	Semih Çelik	Kocaeli
Halkbank	(Bulgaria) Radostin Stoychev		Ankara
İstanbul Bş. Bld.			Istanbul
İstanbul Gençlik			Istanbul
Onikişubat Belediyespor	(Turkey) Mehmet Aydın		Kahramanmaraş
Spor Toto			Ankara
Sultanbeyli Belediyespor			Bursa
Sungurlu Belediyespor			Çorum
Ziraat Bankkart			Ankara

== Competition format ==
The season will consist of a double round-robin regular season following by classification play-offs. After the league stage, the top four teams will enter the championship play-offs, while other teams will play classification rounds.

== Regular season ==
The regular season will play by 14 teams over 26 matches.

Pos	Team	Pld	W	L	Pts	SW	SL	SR	SPW	SPL	SPR	Qualification or relegation
1	Ziraat Bankkart	8	8	0	22	24	6	4.000	720	626	1.150	Play-off (1st-4th)
2	Halkbank	6	6	0	17	18	3	6.000	520	437	1.190	Play-off (1st-4th)
3	Fenerbahçe	7	6	1	16	18	9	2.000	622	562	1.107	Play-off (1st-4th)
4	Galatasaray	7	4	3	13	15	11	1.364	615	590	1.042	Play-off (1st-4th)
5	Gebze Belediyespor	7	4	3	12	14	11	1.273	590	562	1.050	Play-off (5th-8th)
6	İstanbul Bş. Bld.	7	4	3	12	15	13	1.154	604	604	1.000	Play-off (5th-8th)
7	Altekma	7	4	3	10	14	15	0.933	607	639	0.950	Play-off (5th-8th)
8	Alanya Belediyespor	7	3	4	11	14	12	1.167	575	497	1.157	Play-off (5th-8th)
9	Spor Toto	7	3	4	11	15	15	1.000	649	668	0.972	
10	Gaziantep Gençlik	7	3	4	8	12	16	0.750	615	639	0.962	
11	Onikişubat Belediyespor	7	2	5	6	11	19	0.579	627	669	0.937	
12	İstanbul Gençlik	6	1	5	3	7	17	0.412	529	557	0.950	
13	Sultanbeyli Belediyespor	7	1	6	1	7	20	0.350	481	614	0.783	Relegation
14	Sungurlu Belediyespor	8	0	8	2	7	24	0.292	641	731	0.877	Relegation

Updated to match(es) played on 21 November 2026. Source: TVF

=== Fixture and Results ===
==== First Half (Weeks 1-13) ====
The first half of the season will be played between October 17 and December 26, 2026. The Sultanbeyli Belediyespor - Alanya Belediyespor match, which was scheduled to be played in the 1st week of the league, could not be played because Sultanbeyli Belediyespor did not show up for the match, and Sultanbeyli Belediyespor was declared to have lost by default.

Date	Time		Score		Set 1	Set 2	Set 3	Set 4	Set 5	Total	Report
Week 1
17 Oct 26	14.00	Sungurlu Belediyespor	1–3	İstanbul Bş. Bld.	21–25	14–25	25–23	22–25		82–98	Report
17 Oct 26	16.00	Altekma	3–2	Spor Toto	27–29	21–25	25–9	27–25	15–13	115–101	Report
17 Oct 26	16.00	Halkbank	3–1	Galatasaray	23–25	25–20	27–25	25–23		100–93	Report
17 Oct 26	16.00	Onikişubat Belediyespor	1–3	Gebze Belediyespor	23–25	30–28	16–25	20–25		89–103	Report
17 Oct 26	16.00	Sultanbeyli Belediyespor	0–3	ON Hotels Alanya Belediyespor	0–25	0–25	0–25			0–75	Report
17 Oct 26	19.00	Fenerbahçe Medicana	0–3	Ziraat Bankkart	22–25	21–25	22–25			65–75	Report
3 Nov 26	14.00	İstanbul Gençlik	2–3	Gaziantep Gençlik	23–25	25–18	25–23	22–25	17–19	112–110	Report

Date	Time		Score		Set 1	Set 2	Set 3	Set 4	Set 5	Total	Report
Week 2
24 Oct 26	13.00	Galatasaray	3–0	Onikişubat Belediyespor	25–14	25–20	31–29			81–63	Report
24 Oct 26	14.00	Gebze Belediyespor	3–0	Sungurlu Belediyespor	25–19	25–19	25–12			75–50	Report
24 Oct 26	16.00	Spor Toto	2–3	Halkbank	27–25	23–25	25–20	33–35	9–15	117–120	Report
24 Oct 26	16.00	Gaziantep Gençlik	2–3	Fenerbahçe Medicana	25–23	25–19	21–25	22–25	13–15	106–107	Report
24 Oct 26	16.00	ON Hotels Alanya Belediyespor	3–0	İstanbul Gençlik	25–19	25–19	25–21			75–59	Report
24 Oct 26	16.30	İstanbul Bş. Bld.	3–2	Sultanbeyli Belediyespor	25–15	17–25	20–25	25–21	15–12	102–98	Report
24 Oct 26	19.00	Ziraat Bankkart	2–3	Altekma	14–25	25–21	22–25	25–15	15–10	101–96	Report

Date	Time		Score		Set 1	Set 2	Set 3	Set 4	Set 5	Total	Report
Week 3
27 Oct 26	14.00	İstanbul Gençlik	3–2	İstanbul Bş. Bld.	20–25	25–20	25–18	26–28	15–11	111–102	Report
27 Oct 26	15.00	Altekma	0–3	Halkbank	20–25	12–25	22–25			54–75	Report
27 Oct 26	16.00	Sultanbeyli Belediyespor	0–3	Gebze Belediyespor	17–25	18–25	22–25			57–75	Report
27 Oct 26	16.30	Sungurlu Belediyespor	1–3	Galatasaray	24–26	19–25	25–19	21–25		89–95	Report
27 Oct 26	19.00	Ziraat Bankkart	3–1	Gaziantep Gençlik	25–21	24–26	25–17	25–18		99–82	Report
27 Oct 26	19.00	Fenerbahçe Medicana	3–0	ON Hotels Alanya Belediyespor	25–23	25–20	25–18			75–61	Report
27 Oct 26	19.00	Onikişubat Belediyespor	3–2	Spor Toto	17–25	25–19	25–21	15–25	15–12	97–102	Report

Date	Time		Score		Set 1	Set 2	Set 3	Set 4	Set 5	Total	Report
Week 4
31 Oct 26	13.00	Halkbank	3–0	Onikişubat Belediyespor	25–17	25–20	25–17			75–54	Report
31 Oct 26	14.00	Gebze Belediyespor	3–1	İstanbul Gençlik	25–21	25–19	17–25	25–23		92–88	Report
31 Oct 26	16.00	ON Hotels Alanya Belediyespor	2–3	Ziraat Bankkart	25–19	19–25	27–25	25–27	7–15	103–111	Report
31 Oct 26	16.00	Gaziantep Gençlik	0–3	Altekma	29–31	23–25	23–25			75–81	Report
31 Oct 26	16.00	Spor Toto	3–1	Sungurlu Belediyespor	25–20	20–25	25–23	25–19		95–87	Report
31 Oct 26	16.30	İstanbul Bş. Bld.	1–3	Fenerbahçe Medicana	25–21	18–25	21–25	15–25		79–96	Report
31 Oct 26	19.00	Galatasaray	3–0	Sultanbeyli Belediyespor	25–23	25–17	25–22			75–62	Report

Date	Time		Score		Set 1	Set 2	Set 3	Set 4	Set 5	Total	Report
Week 5
7 Nov 26	14.00	İstanbul Gençlik	1–3	Galatasaray	25–18	15–25	26–28	23–25		89–96	Report
7 Nov 26	16.00	Altekma	3–2	Onikişubat Belediyespor	17–25	27–25	19–25	25–22	15–13	103–110	Report
7 Nov 26	16.00	Gaziantep Gençlik	3–2	ON Hotels Alanya Belediyespor	25–18	25–23	22–25	21–25	15–10	108–101	Report
7 Nov 26	16.00	Ziraat Bankkart	3–0	İstanbul Bş. Bld.	25–20	25–17	25–14			75–51	Report
7 Nov 26	16.00	Sultanbeyli Belediyespor	2–3	Spor Toto	21–25	25–21	25–18	20–25	13–15	104–104	Report
7 Nov 26	16.30	Sungurlu Belediyespor	0–3	Halkbank	17–25	23–25	21–25			61–75	Report
7 Nov 26	19.00	Fenerbahçe Medicana	3–1	Gebze Belediyespor	25–21	24–26	25–23	25–18		99–88	Report

Date	Time		Score		Set 1	Set 2	Set 3	Set 4	Set 5	Total	Report
Week 6
14 Nov 26	14.00	Gebze Belediyespor	1–3	Ziraat Bankkart	28–30	25–22	20–25	20–25		93–102	Report
14 Nov 26	14.00	ON Hotels Alanya Belediyespor	3–0	Altekma	25–15	25–16	25–17			75–48	Report
14 Nov 26	16.00	Onikişubat Belediyespor	3–2	Sungurlu Belediyespor	20–25	25–21	25–23	23–25	15–11	108–105	Report
14 Nov 26	16.00	Spor Toto	3–0	İstanbul Gençlik	31–29	25–22	25–19			81–70	Report
14 Nov 26	16.30	İstanbul Bş. Bld.	3–0	Gaziantep Gençlik	25–17	25–18	25–22			75–57	Report
14 Nov 26	19.00	Halkbank	3–0	Sultanbeyli Belediyespor	25–23	25–20	25–17			75–60	Report
14 Nov 26	19.00	Galatasaray	2–3	Fenerbahçe Medicana	25–21	25–19	23–25	18–25	13–15	104–105	Report

Date	Time		Score		Set 1	Set 2	Set 3	Set 4	Set 5	Total	Report
Week 7
21 Nov 26	16.00	Ziraat Bankkart	3–0	Galatasaray	25–18	25–23	32–30			82–71	Report
21 Nov 26	16.00	ON Hotels Alanya Belediyespor	1–3	İstanbul Bş. Bld.	20–25	21–25	25–21	19–25		85–96	Report
21 Nov 26	16.00	Gaziantep Gençlik	3–0	Gebze Belediyespor	27–25	25–20	25–19			77–64	Report
21 Nov 26	16.00	Sultanbeyli Belediyespor	3–2	Onikişubat Belediyespor	18–25	25–23	17–25	25–23	15–12	100–108	Report
21 Nov 26	18.00	Altekma	3–2	Sungurlu Belediyespor	25–18	22–25	22–25	26–24	15–10	110–102	Report
21 Nov 26	19.00	Fenerbahçe Medicana	3–0	Spor Toto	25–17	25–15	25–17			75–49	Report
22 Nov 26	14.00	İstanbul Gençlik	–	Halkbank	–	–	–	–	–	0–0	Report

Date	Time		Score		Set 1	Set 2	Set 3	Set 4	Set 5	Total	Report
Week 8
28 Nov 26	14.00	Sungurlu Belediyespor	–	Sultanbeyli Belediyespor	–	–	–	–	–	0–0	Report
28 Nov 26	14.00	Halkbank	–	Fenerbahçe Medicana	–	–	–	–	–	0–0	Report
28 Nov 26	14.00	Gebze Belediyespor	–	ON Hotels Alanya Belediyespor	–	–	–	–	–	0–0	Report
28 Nov 26	16.00	Onikişubat Belediyespor	–	İstanbul Gençlik	–	–	–	–	–	0–0	Report
28 Nov 26	16.30	İstanbul Bş. Bld.	–	Altekma	–	–	–	–	–	0–0	Report
28 Nov 26	19.00	Galatasaray	–	Gaziantep Gençlik	–	–	–	–	–	0–0	Report
28 Nov 26	19.00	Spor Toto	–	Ziraat Bankkart	–	–	–	–	–	0–0	Report

Date	Time		Score		Set 1	Set 2	Set 3	Set 4	Set 5	Total	Report
Week 9
		Altekma	–	Sultanbeyli Belediyespor	–	–	–	–	–	0–0	
		İstanbul Bş. Bld.	–	Gebze Belediyespor	–	–	–	–	–	0–0	
		İstanbul Gençlik	–	Sungurlu Belediyespor	–	–	–	–	–	0–0	
		ON Hotels Alanya Belediyespor	–	Galatasaray	–	–	–	–	–	0–0	
		Fenerbahçe Medicana	–	Onikişubat Belediyespor	–	–	–	–	–	0–0	
		Gaziantep Gençlik	–	Spor Toto	–	–	–	–	–	0–0	
		Ziraat Bankkart	–	Halkbank	–	–	–	–	–	0–0	

Date	Time		Score		Set 1	Set 2	Set 3	Set 4	Set 5	Total	Report
Week 10
24 Nov 26		Onikişubat Belediyespor	–	Ziraat Bankkart	–	–	–	–	–	0–0	Report
		Gebze Belediyespor	–	Altekma	–	–	–	–	–	0–0	
		Sultanbeyli Belediyespor	–	İstanbul Gençlik	–	–	–	–	–	0–0	
		Galatasaray	–	İstanbul Bş. Bld.	–	–	–	–	–	0–0	
		Sungurlu Belediyespor	–	Fenerbahçe Medicana	–	–	–	–	–	0–0	
		Spor Toto	–	ON Hotels Alanya Belediyespor	–	–	–	–	–	0–0	
		Halkbank	–	Gaziantep Gençlik	–	–	–	–	–	0–0	

Date	Time		Score		Set 1	Set 2	Set 3	Set 4	Set 5	Total	Report
Week 11
3 Nov 26		Ziraat Bankkart	3–0	Sungurlu Belediyespor	25–21	25–22	25–22	–	–	75–65	Report
		Altekma	–	İstanbul Gençlik	–	–	–	–	–	0–0	
		Gebze Belediyespor	–	Galatasaray	–	–	–	–	–	0–0	
		Fenerbahçe Medicana	–	Sultanbeyli Belediyespor	–	–	–	–	–	0–0	
		İstanbul Bş. Bld.	–	Spor Toto	–	–	–	–	–	0–0	
		ON Hotels Alanya Belediyespor	–	Halkbank	–	–	–	–	–	0–0	
		Gaziantep Gençlik	–	Onikişubat Belediyespor	–	–	–	–	–	0–0	

Date	Time		Score		Set 1	Set 2	Set 3	Set 4	Set 5	Total	Report
Week 12
		Galatasaray	–	Altekma	–	–	–	–	–	0–0	
		İstanbul Gençlik	–	Fenerbahçe Medicana	–	–	–	–	–	0–0	
		Spor Toto	–	Gebze Belediyespor	–	–	–	–	–	0–0	
		Sultanbeyli Belediyespor	–	Ziraat Bankkart	–	–	–	–	–	0–0	
		Halkbank	–	İstanbul Bş. Bld.	–	–	–	–	–	0–0	
		Sungurlu Belediyespor	–	Gaziantep Gençlik	–	–	–	–	–	0–0	
		Onikişubat Belediyespor	–	ON Hotels Alanya Belediyespor	–	–	–	–	–	0–0	

Date	Time		Score		Set 1	Set 2	Set 3	Set 4	Set 5	Total	Report
Week 13
		Altekma	–	Fenerbahçe Medicana	–	–	–	–	–	0–0	
		Galatasaray	–	Spor Toto	–	–	–	–	–	0–0	
		Ziraat Bankkart	–	İstanbul Gençlik	–	–	–	–	–	0–0	
		Gebze Belediyespor	–	Halkbank	–	–	–	–	–	0–0	
		Gaziantep Gençlik	–	Sultanbeyli Belediyespor	–	–	–	–	–	0–0	
		İstanbul Bş. Bld.	–	Onikişubat Belediyespor	–	–	–	–	–	0–0	
		ON Hotels Alanya Belediyespor	–	Sungurlu Belediyespor	–	–	–	–	–	0–0	

==== Second Half (Weeks 14-26) ====
The second half of the season will be played between January 10 and April 4, 2027.

Date	Time		Score		Set 1	Set 2	Set 3	Set 4	Set 5	Total	Report
Week 14
		Spor Toto	–	Altekma	–	–	–	–		0–0	
		Ziraat Bankkart	–	Fenerbahçe Medicana	–	–	–	–		0–0	
		Galatasaray	–	Halkbank	–	–	–	–		0–0	
		Gaziantep Gençlik	–	İstanbul Gençlik	–	–	–	–		0–0	
		Gebze Belediyespor	–	Onikişubat Belediyespor	–	–	–	–		0–0	
		ON Hotels Alanya Belediyespor	–	Sultanbeyli Belediyespor	–	–	–	–		0–0	
		İstanbul Bş. Bld.	–	Sungurlu Belediyespor	–	–	–	–		0–0	

Date	Time		Score		Set 1	Set 2	Set 3	Set 4	Set 5	Total	Report
Week 15
		Altekma	–	Ziraat Bankkart	–	–	–	–		0–0	
		Halkbank	–	Spor Toto	–	–	–	–		0–0	
		Fenerbahçe Medicana	–	Gaziantep Gençlik	–	–	–	–		0–0	
		Onikişubat Belediyespor	–	Galatasaray	–	–	–	–		0–0	
		İstanbul Gençlik	–	ON Hotels Alanya Belediyespor	–	–	–	–		0–0	
		Sungurlu Belediyespor	–	Gebze Belediyespor	–	–	–	–		0–0	
		Sultanbeyli Belediyespor	–	İstanbul Bş. Bld.	–	–	–	–		0–0	

Date	Time		Score		Set 1	Set 2	Set 3	Set 4	Set 5	Total	Report
Week 16
		Halkbank	–	Altekma	–	–	–	–		0–0	
		Gaziantep Gençlik	–	Ziraat Bankkart	–	–	–	–		0–0	
		Spor Toto	–	Onikişubat Belediyespor	–	–	–	–		0–0	
		ON Hotels Alanya Belediyespor	–	Fenerbahçe Medicana	–	–	–	–		0–0	
		Galatasaray	–	Sungurlu Belediyespor	–	–	–	–		0–0	
		İstanbul Bş. Bld.	–	İstanbul Gençlik	–	–	–	–		0–0	
		Gebze Belediyespor	–	Sultanbeyli Belediyespor	–	–	–	–		0–0	

Date	Time		Score		Set 1	Set 2	Set 3	Set 4	Set 5	Total	Report
Week 17
		Altekma	–	Gaziantep Gençlik	–	–	–	–		0–0	
		Onikişubat Belediyespor	–	Halkbank	–	–	–	–		0–0	
		Ziraat Bankkart	–	ON Hotels Alanya Belediyespor	–	–	–	–		0–0	
		Sungurlu Belediyespor	–	Spor Toto	–	–	–	–		0–0	
		Fenerbahçe Medicana	–	İstanbul Bş. Bld.	–	–	–	–		0–0	
		Sultanbeyli Belediyespor	–	Galatasaray	–	–	–	–		0–0	
		İstanbul Gençlik	–	Gebze Belediyespor	–	–	–	–		0–0	

Date	Time		Score		Set 1	Set 2	Set 3	Set 4	Set 5	Total	Report
Week 18
		Onikişubat Belediyespor	–	Altekma	–	–	–	–		0–0	
		ON Hotels Alanya Belediyespor	–	Gaziantep Gençlik	–	–	–	–		0–0	
		Halkbank	–	Sungurlu Belediyespor	–	–	–	–		0–0	
		İstanbul Bş. Bld.	–	Ziraat Bankkart	–	–	–	–		0–0	
		Spor Toto	–	Sultanbeyli Belediyespor	–	–	–	–		0–0	
		Gebze Belediyespor	–	Fenerbahçe Medicana	–	–	–	–		0–0	
		Galatasaray	–	İstanbul Gençlik	–	–	–	–		0–0	

Date	Time		Score		Set 1	Set 2	Set 3	Set 4	Set 5	Total	Report
Week 19
		Altekma	–	ON Hotels Alanya Belediyespor	–	–	–	–		0–0	
		Sungurlu Belediyespor	–	Onikişubat Belediyespor	–	–	–	–		0–0	
		Gaziantep Gençlik	–	İstanbul Bş. Bld.	–	–	–	–		0–0	
		Sultanbeyli Belediyespor	–	Halkbank	–	–	–	–		0–0	
		Ziraat Bankkart	–	Gebze Belediyespor	–	–	–	–		0–0	
		İstanbul Gençlik	–	Spor Toto	–	–	–	–		0–0	
		Fenerbahçe Medicana	–	Galatasaray	–	–	–	–		0–0	

Date	Time		Score		Set 1	Set 2	Set 3	Set 4	Set 5	Total	Report
Week 20
		Sungurlu Belediyespor	–	Altekma	–	–	–	–		0–0	
		İstanbul Bş. Bld.	–	ON Hotels Alanya Belediyespor	–	–	–	–		0–0	
		Onikişubat Belediyespor	–	Sultanbeyli Belediyespor	–	–	–	–		0–0	
		Gebze Belediyespor	–	Gaziantep Gençlik	–	–	–	–		0–0	
		Halkbank	–	İstanbul Gençlik	–	–	–	–		0–0	
		Galatasaray	–	Ziraat Bankkart	–	–	–	–		0–0	
		Spor Toto	–	Fenerbahçe Medicana	–	–	–	–		0–0	

Date	Time		Score		Set 1	Set 2	Set 3	Set 4	Set 5	Total	Report
Week 21
		Altekma	–	İstanbul Bş. Bld.	–	–	–	–		0–0	
		Sultanbeyli Belediyespor	–	Sungurlu Belediyespor	–	–	–	–		0–0	
		ON Hotels Alanya Belediyespor	–	Gebze Belediyespor	–	–	–	–		0–0	
		İstanbul Gençlik	–	Onikişubat Belediyespor	–	–	–	–		0–0	
		Gaziantep Gençlik	–	Galatasaray	–	–	–	–		0–0	
		Fenerbahçe Medicana	–	Halkbank	–	–	–	–		0–0	
		Ziraat Bankkart	–	Spor Toto	–	–	–	–		0–0	

Date	Time		Score		Set 1	Set 2	Set 3	Set 4	Set 5	Total	Report
Week 22
		Sultanbeyli Belediyespor	–	Altekma	–	–	–	–		0–0	
		Gebze Belediyespor	–	İstanbul Bş. Bld.	–	–	–	–		0–0	
		Sungurlu Belediyespor	–	İstanbul Gençlik	–	–	–	–		0–0	
		Galatasaray	–	ON Hotels Alanya Belediyespor	–	–	–	–		0–0	
		Onikişubat Belediyespor	–	Fenerbahçe Medicana	–	–	–	–		0–0	
		Spor Toto	–	Gaziantep Gençlik	–	–	–	–		0–0	
		Halkbank	–	Ziraat Bankkart	–	–	–	–		0–0	

Date	Time		Score		Set 1	Set 2	Set 3	Set 4	Set 5	Total	Report
Week 23
		Altekma	–	Gebze Belediyespor	–	–	–	–		0–0	
		İstanbul Gençlik	–	Sultanbeyli Belediyespor	–	–	–	–		0–0	
		İstanbul Bş. Bld.	–	Galatasaray	–	–	–	–		0–0	
		Fenerbahçe Medicana	–	Sungurlu Belediyespor	–	–	–	–		0–0	
		ON Hotels Alanya Belediyespor	–	Spor Toto	–	–	–	–		0–0	
		Ziraat Bankkart	–	Onikişubat Belediyespor	–	–	–	–		0–0	
		Gaziantep Gençlik	–	Halkbank	–	–	–	–		0–0	

Date	Time		Score		Set 1	Set 2	Set 3	Set 4	Set 5	Total	Report
Week 24
		İstanbul Gençlik	–	Altekma	–	–	–	–		0–0	
		Galatasaray	–	Gebze Belediyespor	–	–	–	–		0–0	
		Sultanbeyli Belediyespor	–	Fenerbahçe Medicana	–	–	–	–		0–0	
		Spor Toto	–	İstanbul Bş. Bld.	–	–	–	–		0–0	
		Sungurlu Belediyespor	–	Ziraat Bankkart	–	–	–	–		0–0	
		Halkbank	–	ON Hotels Alanya Belediyespor	–	–	–	–		0–0	
		Onikişubat Belediyespor	–	Gaziantep Gençlik	–	–	–	–		0–0	

Date	Time		Score		Set 1	Set 2	Set 3	Set 4	Set 5	Total	Report
Week 25
		Altekma	–	Galatasaray	–	–	–	–		0–0	
		Fenerbahçe Medicana	–	İstanbul Gençlik	–	–	–	–		0–0	
		Gebze Belediyespor	–	Spor Toto	–	–	–	–		0–0	
		Ziraat Bankkart	–	Sultanbeyli Belediyespor	–	–	–	–		0–0	
		İstanbul Bş. Bld.	–	Halkbank	–	–	–	–		0–0	
		Gaziantep Gençlik	–	Sungurlu Belediyespor	–	–	–	–		0–0	
		ON Hotels Alanya Belediyespor	–	Onikişubat Belediyespor	–	–	–	–		0–0	

Date	Time		Score		Set 1	Set 2	Set 3	Set 4	Set 5	Total	Report
Week 26
		Fenerbahçe Medicana	–	Altekma	–	–	–	–		0–0	
		Spor Toto	–	Galatasaray	–	–	–	–		0–0	
		İstanbul Gençlik	–	Ziraat Bankkart	–	–	–	–		0–0	
		Halkbank	–	Gebze Belediyespor	–	–	–	–		0–0	
		Sultanbeyli Belediyespor	–	Gaziantep Gençlik	–	–	–	–		0–0	
		Onikişubat Belediyespor	–	İstanbul Bş. Bld.	–	–	–	–		0–0	
		Sungurlu Belediyespor	–	ON Hotels Alanya Belediyespor	–	–	–	–		0–0	
