= 2015–16 Turkish Men's Volleyball League =

- League: Turkish Men's Volleyball League
- Sport: Volleyball
- Games: 132 (Regular season)
- Teams: 12

Regular season
- Season champions: Halkbank

Finals
- Champions: Halkbank
- Runners-up: İstanbul BB

Turkish Men's Volleyball League seasons
- ← 2014–15 2016–17 →

The 2015–16 Turkish Men's Volleyball League was the 46th edition of the top-flight professional men's volleyball league in Turkey.

== Regular season ==
=== League table ===
Pos	Team	Pld	W	L	SF	SA	Pts	Qualification
1	Halkbank	21	18	3	55	22	51	Playoffs
2	Fenerbahçe	21	15	6	49	29	43	Playoffs
3	Arkas	21	14	7	48	30	41	Playoffs
4	İstanbul BB	21	14	7	46	32	41	Playoffs
5	Ziraat Bankası	21	13	8	49	32	41	Playoffs
6	Maliye Piyango	21	11	10	42	40	32	Playoffs
7	Galatasaray HDI Sigorta	21	9	12	35	45	27	Playoffs
8	İnegöl	21	8	13	36	44	26	Playoffs
9	Tokat Belediye Plevne	21	7	14	32	50	21	Play out
10	Beşiktaş	21	7	14	30	48	20	Play out
11	Bornova A.L.	21	2	19	18	60	9	Play out
12	Şahinbey	11	3	8	18	26	11	Play out

Source: Turkish Volleyball Federation

=== Results ===
Home \ Away	ARK	BEŞ	BOR	FEN	GAL	HAL	İNE	İBB	MAL	ŞAH	TOK	ZİR
Arkas		3–1	3–0	3–0	3–0	0–3	3–2	3–0	3–0	3–1	3–1	2–3
Beşiktaş	0–3		3–0	0–3	1–3	1–3	1–3	1–3	2–3		3–0	0–3
Bornova A.L.	0–3	0–3		1–3	1–3	0–3	0–3	0–3	0–3	2–3	1–3	3–2
Fenerbahçe	3–0	1–3	3–0		3–1	2–3	0–3	0–3	3–0	3–0	3–2	3–1
Galatasaray HDI Sigorta	3–1	3–1	3–2	0–3		0–3	3–1	2–3	0–3		3–0	3–1
Halkbank	3–1	3–0	3–1	0–3	3–1		3–0	3–0	3–2		0–3	3–0
İnegöl	3–0	2–3	1–3	1–3	3–1	1–3		3–0	3–1		3–2	0–3
İstanbul BB	2–3	3–0	3–0	3–1	3–1	0–3	3–1		3–0	3–2	3–2	3–0
Maliye Piyango	0–3	3–1	3–2	2–3	3–1	2–3	3–2	3–0			3–0	1–3
Şahinbey		2–3			1–3	1–3	3–0		2–3		3–0	
Tokat Bld Plevne	3–2	1–3	3–2	1–3	3–1	1–3	3–0	1–3	0–3			3–2
Ziraat Bankası	2–3	3–0	3–0	2–3	3–0	3–1	3–1	3–2	3–1	3–0	3–0	

Updated to match(es) played on 27 March 2016. Source: TMVL Fixtures
Legend: Blue = home team win; Yellow = draw; Red = away team win.

== Play-out ==
Pos	Team	Pld	W	L	SF	SA	Pts	Relegation	BEŞ	TOK	BOR
9	Beşiktaş	25	10	15	41	54	29			3–1	3–0
10	Tokat Bld Plevne	25	8	17	40	60	26		2–3		3–1
11	Bornova A.L.	25	4	21	25	70	13	Relegation to Turkish Men Volleyball Second League	3–2	3–2	

== Classification group ==
Pos	Team	Pld	W	L	SF	SA	Pts	ZİR	GAL	MAL	İNE
5	Ziraat Bankası	6	6	0	18	3	17		3–0	3–0	3–0
6	Galatasaray HDI Sigorta	6	4	2	14	10	13	2–3		3–1	3–1
7	Maliye Piyango	6	1	5	7	15	3	1–3	1–3		1–3
8	İnegöl	6	1	5	5	16	3	0–3	1–3	0–3	

== Final group ==
Pos	Team	Pld	W	L	SF	SA	Pts	HAL	İBB	ARK	FEN
1	Halkbank	6	5	1	17	8	15		2–3	3–2	3–1
2	İstanbul BB	6	5	1	16	7	13	1–3		3–0	3–0
3	Arkas	6	2	4	11	13	8	1–3	2–3		3–0
4	Fenerbahçe	6	0	6	2	18	0	0–3	0–3	1–3	

Turkish Men's Volleyball League
2015–16 champions

Seventh title
