= Mert Matić =

Professional volleyball player of Bosniak origin on Turkish national team

Marko Mert Matić
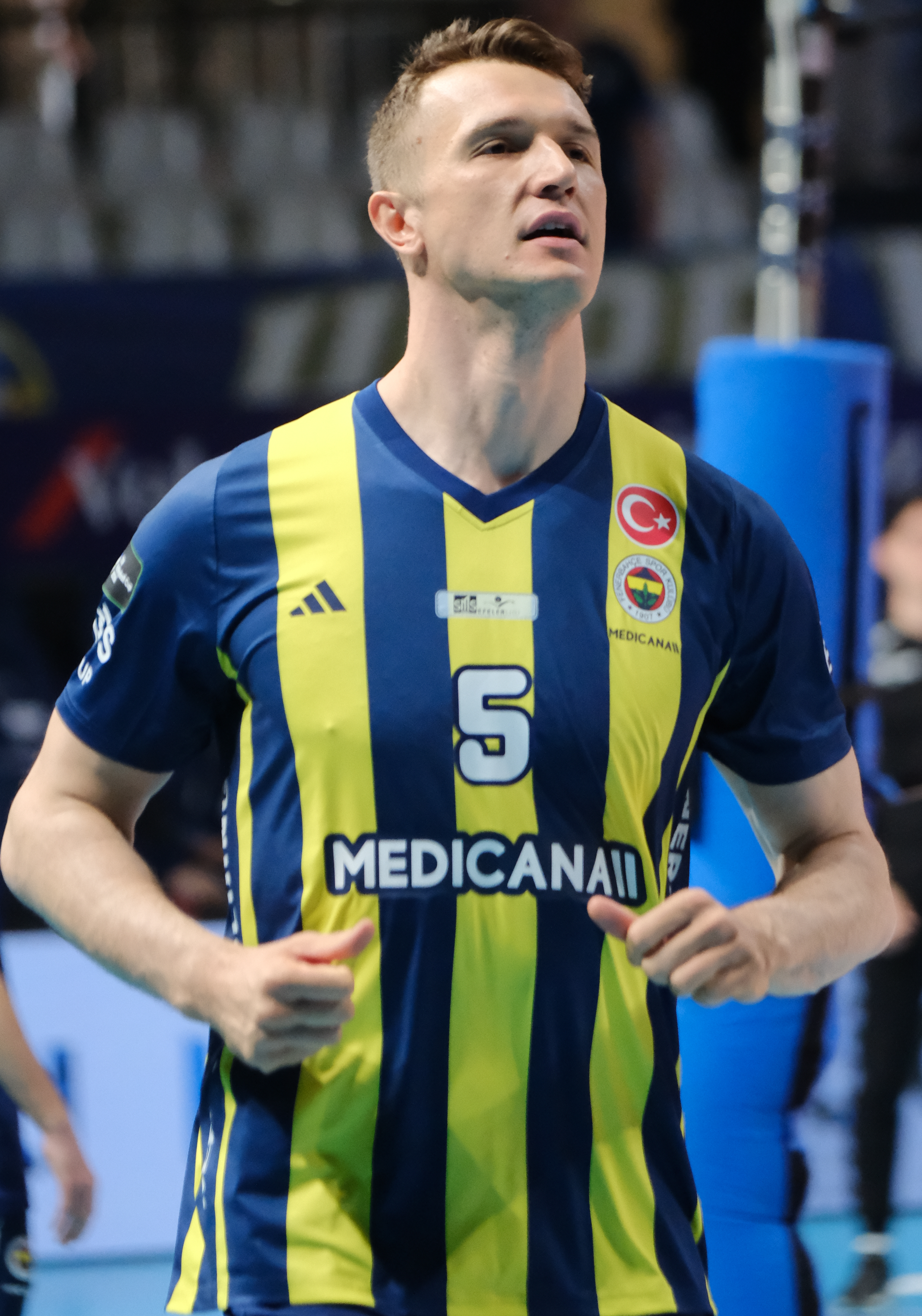

Personal information
- Nationality: Turkish
- Born: 22 May 1995 (age 31)
- Height: 2.11 m (6 ft 11 in)
- Weight: 105 kg (231 lb)
- Spike: 360 cm (142 in)
- Block: 350 cm (138 in)

Volleyball information
- Position: Middle blocker
- Current club: Fenerbahçe
- Number: 5

Career
- Years: Team
- 2014–2017 2017–2021 2021–2022 2022–2025 2025–: IBB Spor Kulübü; Arkas İzmir; Spor Toto; Halkbank; Fenerbahçe

National team
- Years: Team
- 2017–: Turkey
Honours
Men's volleyball
Representing Turkey
FIVB Challenger Cup
Gold medal – first place	2023 Doha
European League
Gold medal – first place	2023 Croatia

Marko Mert Matić (born 22 May 1995) is a professional volleyball player of Bosnian Croat origin who plays as an outside hitter for Fenerbahçe and represents Turkish national team.

== Career ==
He started his professional career with IBB Spor Kulübü in the 2014-2015 season and later played for Arkas İzmir, Spor Toto and Halkbank.

== International career ==
He participated in the 2017 Men's European Volleyball Championship and 2021 Men's European Volleyball Championship.

== Personal life ==
He is married with former national taekwondo athlete İrem Yaman since 2 September 2024.

== Honours ==
=== Club ===
- CEV Challenge Cup
  - 2022 with Halkbank
- BVA Cup
  - 2021 with Halkbank
- Turkish League
  - 2023–24 with Halkbank
  - 2015–16, 2017–18, 2018–19 with Arkas İzmir 2022–23 with Halkbank
- Turkish Cup
  - 2023, 2024 with Halkbank
  - 2025 with Halkbank

=== Individual awards ===
- 2015–16: Turkish League - Best middle-blocker
- 2015–16: Turkish League - Best blocker
- 2016–17: Turkish Cup - Best middle-blocker
- 2018–19: Turkish Cup - Best middle-blocker
- 2022–23: CEV Champions League - Best middle-blocker
- 2023–24: Turkish League - Best middle-blocker
- 2023–24: Turkish Cup - Best blocker
- 2022: U22 CEV European Championship – Best attacker
