= 2025–26 Turkish Men's Volleyball League =

- League: Turkish Men's Volleyball League
- Sport: Volleyball
- Duration: 25 October 2025 – 27 April 2026
- Teams: 14

Regular season
- Season champions: (Turkey) Ziraat Bankkart

Play-offs

Final
- Champions: (Turkey) Ziraat Bankkart
- Runners-up: (Turkey) Galatasaray
- Finals MVP: (Turkey) Berkay Bayraktar

Turkish Men's Volleyball League seasons
- ← 2024–25 2026–27 →

The 2025–26 Turkish Men's Volleyball League, branded as the 2025–26 SMS Grup Efeler League (Turkish: 2025–26 SMS Grup Efeler Ligi), was the 56th edition of the top-level Men's volleyball league in Turkey. The competition was organised by the Turkish Volleyball Federation.

Ziraat Bankkart won the championship after defeating Galatasaray in the play-off final series, 3–0. Berkay Bayraktar of Ziraat Bankkart was named the most valuable player of the final.

== Regular season ==
The regular season was played by 14 teams over 25 matches. Ziraat Bankkart finished first with 23 wins and 67 points.

Pos	Team	Pld	W	L	Pts	SW	SL	SR	SPW	SPL	SPR	Qualification or relegation
1	Ziraat Bankkart	25	23	2	67	70	17	4.118	2110	1742	1.211	Play-off (1st-4th)
2	Halkbank	25	20	5	57	65	26	2.500	2161	1945	1.111	Play-off (1st-4th)
3	Galatasaray HDI Sigorta	25	19	6	51	60	37	1.622	2252	2051	1.098	Play-off (1st-4th)
4	Spor Toto	25	17	8	49	59	44	1.341	2370	2282	1.039	Play-off (1st-4th)
5	İstanbul Gençlik	25	16	9	51	59	37	1.595	2221	2108	1.054	Play-off (5th-8th)
6	Fenerbahçe Medicana	25	14	11	44	51	39	1.308	2094	1970	1.063	Play-off (5th-8th)
7	Bursa Belediye Spor	25	14	11	41	50	48	1.042	2189	2203	0.994	Play-off (5th-8th)
8	Altekma	25	11	14	34	47	52	0.904	2186	2193	0.997	Play-off (5th-8th)
9	Gebze Belediyespor	25	10	15	28	39	55	0.709	2074	2135	0.971	
10	Gaziantep Gençlik	25	8	17	21	35	61	0.574	2087	2259	0.924	
11	Alanya Belediyespor	25	6	19	26	43	60	0.717	2191	2292	0.956	
12	İstanbul Bş. Bld.	25	6	19	23	34	62	0.548	2118	2239	0.946	
13	Akkuş Belediyesi	25	5	20	15	26	66	0.394	1879	2218	0.847	Relegation
14	Cizre Belediyespor	13	0	13	0	5	39	0.128	782	1078	0.725	Relegation

Updated to match(es) played on unknown. Source: TVF

=== Fixture and Results ===
==== First Half (Weeks 1-13) ====
Date	Time		Score		Set 1	Set 2	Set 3	Set 4	Set 5	Total	Report
Week 1
25 Oct 25	13.00	Cizre Belediyespor	1–3	İstanbul Bş. Bld.	19–25	25–19	19–25	18–25		81–94	Report
25 Oct 25	14.00	Alanya Belediyespor	2–3	Halkbank	18–25	29–27	20–25	28–26	9–15	104–118	Report
25 Oct 25	14.00	İstanbul Gençlik	3–1	Gaziantep Gençlik	25–23	19–25	25–16	25–19		94–83	Report
25 Oct 25	15.00	Galatasaray	3–1	Altekma	17–25	25–19	25–21	28–26		95–91	Report
25 Oct 25	16.00	Bursa Belediye Spor	0–3	Gebze Belediyespor	18–25	21–25	21–25			60–75	Report
25 Oct 25	19.30	Ziraat Bankkart	3–0	Fenerbahçe	32–30	27–25	25–19			84–74	Report
02 Nov 25	18.00	Spor Toto	3–2	Akkuş Belediyespor	23–25	25–23	25–21	21–25	15–12	109–106	Report

Date	Time		Score		Set 1	Set 2	Set 3	Set 4	Set 5	Total	Report
Week 2
28 Oct 25	14.00	Gaziantep Gençlik	3–2	Alanya Belediyespor	17–25	25–22	25–22	15–25	15–11	97–105	Report
28 Oct 25	14.00	Gebze Belediyespor	1–3	Ziraat Bankkart	28–26	15–25	17–25	19–25		79–101	Report
28 Oct 25	15.00	Akkuş Belediyespor	3–1	Cizre Belediyespor	25–21	21–25	25–23	25–20		96–89	Report
28 Oct 25	16.30	İstanbul Bş. Bld.	0–3	İstanbul Gençlik	23–25	22–25	19–25			64–75	Report
28 Oct 25	17.00	Altekma	3–2	Bursa Belediye Spor	25–20	20–25	25–21	22–25	15–12	107–103	Report
28 Oct 25	17.30	Halkbank	3–0	Galatasaray	25–23	25–20	27–25			77–68	Report
29 Oct 25	15.00	Fenerbahçe	3–0	Spor Toto	25–14	26–24	25–22			76–60	Report

Date	Time		Score		Set 1	Set 2	Set 3	Set 4	Set 5	Total	Report
Week 3
16 Nov 25	13.30	Cizre Belediyespor	0–3	Fenerbahçe	17–25	23–25	14–25			54–75	Report
16 Nov 25	14.00	Alanya Belediyespor	1–3	İstanbul Bş. Bld.	19–25	12–25	25–16	14–25		70–91	Report
16 Nov 25	14.00	Spor Toto	3–2	Gebze Belediyespor	22–25	25–22	25–19	23–25	15–11	110–102	Report
16 Nov 25	14.00	Galatasaray	3–2	Gaziantep Gençlik	22–25	25–20	25–19	23–25	15–12	110–101	Report
16 Nov 25	14.00	İstanbul Gençlik	3–1	Akkuş Belediyespor	25–18	31–29	22–25	25–16		103–88	Report
16 Nov 25	15.00	Altekma	2–3	Halkbank	25–21	22–25	16–25	25–21	11–15	99–107	Report
16 Nov 25	16.00	Bursa Belediye Spor	1–3	Ziraat Bankkart	25–22	17–25	21–25	20–25		83–97	Report

Date	Time		Score		Set 1	Set 2	Set 3	Set 4	Set 5	Total	Report
Week 4
19 Nov 25	14.00	Gaziantep Gençlik	1–3	Altekma	24–26	19–25	26–24	13–25		82–100	Report
19 Nov 25	14.00	Halkbank	3–0	Bursa Belediye Spor	25–21	25–19	25–21			75–61	Report
19 Nov 25	14.00	Gebze Belediyespor	3–1	Cizre Belediyespor	25–17	25–21	18–25	25–17		93–80	Report
19 Nov 25	15.00	Akkuş Belediyespor	0–3	Alanya Belediyespor	14–25	27–29	19–25			60–79	Report
19 Nov 25	16.30	İstanbul Bş. Bld.	1–3	Galatasaray	20–25	25–20	22–25	20–25		87–95	Report
19 Nov 25	17.00	Ziraat Bankkart	3–0	Spor Toto	25–18	25–20	25–19			75–57	Report
19 Nov 25	17.00	Fenerbahçe	2–3	İstanbul Gençlik	25–22	23–25	22–25	25–19	8–15	103–106	Report

Date	Time		Score		Set 1	Set 2	Set 3	Set 4	Set 5	Total	Report
Week 5
22 Nov 25	13.00	Cizre Belediyespor	0–3	Ziraat Bankkart	22–25	18–25	18–25			58–75	Report
22 Nov 25	14.00	Alanya Belediyespor	0–3	Fenerbahçe	24–26	15–25	23–25			62–76	Report
22 Nov 25	14.00	İstanbul Gençlik	3–0	Gebze Belediyespor	25–23	25–22	25–17			75–62	Report
22 Nov 25	15.00	Altekma	3–2	İstanbul Bş. Bld.	18–25	25–23	28–26	18–25	15–4	104–103	Report
22 Nov 25	15.00	Halkbank	2–3	Gaziantep Gençlik	25–20	21–25	25–22	17–25	11–15	99–107	Report
22 Nov 25	16.00	Bursa Belediye Spor	2–3	Spor Toto	22–25	25–20	25–18	19–25	12–15	103–103	Report
22 Nov 25	19.00	Galatasaray	3–0	Akkuş Belediyespor	25–23	25–19	25–16			75–58	Report

Date	Time		Score		Set 1	Set 2	Set 3	Set 4	Set 5	Total	Report
Week 6
25 Nov 25	14.00	Gaziantep Gençlik	1–3	Bursa Belediye Spor	19–25	25–18	20–25	22–25		86–93	Report
25 Nov 25	14.00	Spor Toto	3–1	Cizre Belediyespor	21–25	25–19	25–17	25–22		96–83	Report
25 Nov 25	15.00	Akkuş Belediyespor	0–3	Altekma	21–25	17–25	18–25			56–75	Report
25 Nov 25	16.30	İstanbul Bş. Bld.	3–1	Halkbank	25–22	25–21	20–25	25–22		95–90	Report
25 Nov 25	16.30	Ziraat Bankkart	3–0	İstanbul Gençlik	25–21	28–26	25–18			78–65	Report
25 Nov 25	18.00	Gebze Belediyespor	0–3	Alanya Belediyespor	20–25	21–25	21–25			62–75	Report
26 Nov 25	18.00	Fenerbahçe	2–3	Galatasaray	25–22	22–25	21–25	25–17	16–18	109–107	Report

Date	Time		Score		Set 1	Set 2	Set 3	Set 4	Set 5	Total	Report
Week 7
29 Nov 25	13.00	Alanya Belediyespor	1–3	Ziraat Bankkart	18–25	21–25	25–13	17–25		81–88	Report
29 Nov 25	13.00	Galatasaray	3–2	Gebze Belediyespor	25–23	22–25	25–19	23–25	15–6	110–98	Report
29 Nov 25	14.00	Gaziantep Gençlik	0–3	İstanbul Bş. Bld.	30–32	11–25	22–25			63–82	Report
29 Nov 25	14.00	İstanbul Gençlik	3–0	Spor Toto	25–21	25–20	27–25			77–66	Report
29 Nov 25	15.00	Altekma	1–3	Fenerbahçe	25–20	19–25	17–25	18–25		79–95	Report
29 Nov 25	16.00	Halkbank	3–0	Akkuş Belediyespor	25–15	25–22	25–15			75–52	Report
29 Nov 25	19.00	Bursa Belediye Spor	3–0	Cizre Belediyespor	25–17	25–23	25–18			75–58	Report

Date	Time		Score		Set 1	Set 2	Set 3	Set 4	Set 5	Total	Report
Week 8
02 Dec 25	13.00	Ziraat Bankkart	3–2	Galatasaray	25–21	23–25	25–22	18–25	15–11	106–104	Report
02 Dec 25	13.00	Cizre Belediyespor	0–3	İstanbul Gençlik	16–25	17–25	17–25			50–75	Report
02 Dec 25	14.00	Gebze Belediyespor	3–2	Altekma	22–25	23–25	27–25	25–21	15–13	112–109	Report
02 Dec 25	15.00	Akkuş Belediyespor	3–0	Gaziantep Gençlik	25–23	30–28	30–28			85–79	Report
02 Dec 25	15.30	Spor Toto	2–3	Alanya Belediyespor	30–28	25–23	22–25	16–25	14–16	107–117	Report
02 Dec 25	16.30	Fenerbahçe	0–3	Halkbank	20–25	24–26	16–25			60–76	Report
02 Dec 25	16.30	İstanbul Bş. Bld.	1–3	Bursa Belediye Spor	21–25	23–25	25–19	38–40		107–109	Report

Date	Time		Score		Set 1	Set 2	Set 3	Set 4	Set 5	Total	Report
Week 9
06 Dec 25	14.00	Alanya Belediyespor	3–0	Cizre Belediyespor	25–19	25–18	25–20			75–57	Report
06 Dec 25	14.00	Galatasaray	1–3	Spor Toto	25–19	24–26	22–25	16–25		87–95	Report
06 Dec 25	14.00	Halkbank	3–0	Gebze Belediyespor	25–21	25–21	25–22			75–64	Report
06 Dec 25	15.00	Altekma	0–3	Ziraat Bankkart	14–25	29–31	22–25			65–81	Report
06 Dec 25	16.00	Bursa Belediye Spor	3–0	İstanbul Gençlik	25–22	25–16	25–20			75–58	Report
06 Dec 25	16.30	İstanbul Bş. Bld.	2–3	Akkuş Belediyespor	28–30	25–21	16–25	25–15	13–15	107–106	Report
06 Dec 25	17.00	Gaziantep Gençlik	1–3	Fenerbahçe	19–25	25–21	20–25	14–25		78–96	Report

Date	Time		Score		Set 1	Set 2	Set 3	Set 4	Set 5	Total	Report
Week 10
13 Dec 25	13.00	Cizre Belediyespor	0–3	Galatasaray	0–25	0–25	0–25			0–75	Report
13 Dec 25	14.00	Gebze Belediyespor	1–3	Gaziantep Gençlik	23–25	25–18	24–26	21–25		93–94	Report
13 Dec 25	14.00	İstanbul Gençlik	3–0	Alanya Belediyespor	25–21	25–22	25–22			75–65	Report
13 Dec 25	15.00	Akkuş Belediyespor	1–3	Bursa Belediye Spor	25–19	22–25	21–25	14–25		82–94	Report
13 Dec 25	15.00	Fenerbahçe	3–0	İstanbul Bş. Bld.	25–21	25–18	28–26			78–65	Report
13 Dec 25	16.30	Spor Toto	3–1	Altekma	25–20	25–22	30–32	27–25		107–99	Report
13 Dec 25	19.00	Ziraat Bankkart	0–3	Halkbank	23–25	21–25	23–25			67–75	Report

Date	Time		Score		Set 1	Set 2	Set 3	Set 4	Set 5	Total	Report
Week 11
16 Dec 25	14.00	Gaziantep Gençlik	1–3	Ziraat Bankkart	23–25	24–26	25–22	19–25		91–98	Report
16 Dec 25	15.00	Akkuş Belediyespor	0–3	Fenerbahçe	20–25	19–25	16–25			55–75	Report
16 Dec 25	16.30	İstanbul Bş. Bld.	3–1	Gebze Belediyespor	20–25	27–25	25–18	25–23		97–91	Report
16 Dec 25	18.00	Altekma	3–0	Cizre Belediyespor	25–15	25–18	25–21			75–54	Report
16 Dec 25	18.00	Bursa Belediye Spor	3–2	Alanya Belediyespor	19–25	25–20	18–25	27–25	15–13	104–108	Report
16 Dec 25	18.00	Galatasaray	3–2	İstanbul Gençlik	23–25	25–22	20–25	25–21	15–9	108–102	Report
16 Dec 25	18.00	Halkbank	3–0	Spor Toto	25–20	25–21	25–21			75–62	Report

Date	Time		Score		Set 1	Set 2	Set 3	Set 4	Set 5	Total	Report
Week 12
20 Dec 25	13.00	Cizre Belediyespor	0–3	Halkbank	14–25	16–25	15–25			45–75	Report
20 Dec 25	14.00	İstanbul Gençlik	3–1	Altekma	25–21	25–20	21–25	25–22		96–88	Report
20 Dec 25	14.00	Spor Toto	3–1	Gaziantep Gençlik	25–15	25–20	22–25	25–22		97–82	Report
20 Dec 25	14.00	Gebze Belediyespor	3–0	Akkuş Belediyespor	25–14	25–22	25–18			75–54	Report
20 Dec 25	14.30	Alanya Belediyespor	1–3	Galatasaray	25–23	22–25	16–25	21–25		84–98	Report
20 Dec 25	17.00	Fenerbahçe	0–3	Bursa Belediye Spor	22–25	20–25	22–25			64–75	Report
20 Dec 25	17.00	Ziraat Bankkart	3–0	İstanbul Bş. Bld.	25–22	25–23	25–19			75–64	Report

Date	Time		Score		Set 1	Set 2	Set 3	Set 4	Set 5	Total	Report
Week 13
24 Dec 25	14.00	Fenerbahçe	3–1	Gebze Belediyespor	25–18	18–25	25–22	25–23		93–88	Report
24 Dec 25	15.00	Akkuş Belediyespor	1–3	Ziraat Bankkart	23–25	16–25	25–21	14–25		78–96	Report
27 Dec 25	14.00	Gaziantep Gençlik	3–1	Cizre Belediyespor	25–11	25–14	24–26	25–22		99–73	Report
27 Dec 25	14.30	Halkbank	3–2	İstanbul Gençlik	25–23	23–25	21–25	25–22	15–12	109–107	Report
27 Dec 25	16.30	İstanbul Bş. Bld.	1–3	Spor Toto	22–25	25–20	19–25	23–25		89–95	Report
27 Dec 25	17.00	Altekma	3–2	Alanya Belediyespor	25–18	19–25	18–25	25–23	15–10	102–101	Report
27 Dec 25	17.00	Bursa Belediye Spor	0–3	Galatasaray	20–25	23–25	18–25			61–75	Report

==== Second Half (Weeks 14-26) ====
The Fenerbahçe - Cizre Belediyespor match, which was scheduled to be played in the 16th week of the league, could not be played because Cizre Belediyespor did not show up for the match, and Cizre Belediyespor was declared to have lost by default. Following the second default loss in one season, Cizre Belediyespor was expelled from the league, and teams that were scheduled to play against Cizre Belediyespor from the 16th week onwards did not play that week.

Date	Time		Score		Set 1	Set 2	Set 3	Set 4	Set 5	Total	Report
Week 14
11 Jan 26	14.00	Akkuş Belediyespor	3–2	Spor Toto	25–20	20–25	28–26	21–25	17–15	111–111	Report
11 Jan 26	14.00	Gaziantep Gençlik	3–2	İstanbul Gençlik	19–25	30–28	25–16	22–25	17–15	113–109	Report
11 Jan 26	14.00	Gebze Belediyespor	3–2	Bursa Belediye Spor	25–20	21–25	20–25	25–23	15–8	106–101	Report
11 Jan 26	15.00	Altekma	1–3	Galatasaray	25–22	18–25	23–25	21–25		87–97	Report
11 Jan 26	16.00	Halkbank	3–1	Alanya Belediyespor	25–23	25–18	27–29	25–17		102–87	Report
11 Jan 26	16.30	İstanbul Bş. Bld.	3–0	Cizre Belediyespor	25–10	25–22	25–18			75–50	Report
11 Jan 26	19.00	Fenerbahçe	0–3	Ziraat Bankkart	22–25	21–25	20–25			63–75	Report

Date	Time		Score		Set 1	Set 2	Set 3	Set 4	Set 5	Total	Report
Week 15
17 Jan 26	15.00	Bursa Belediye Spor	3–2	Altekma	17–25	25–23	17–25	25–22	15–11	99–106	Report
17 Jan 26	17.00	Ziraat Bankkart	3–0	Gebze Belediyespor	25–22	25–15	25–21			75–58	Report
18 Jan 26	13.00	Cizre Belediyespor	0–3	Akkuş Belediyespor	19–25	19–25	18–25			56–75	Report
18 Jan 26	14.00	Alanya Belediyespor	0–3	Gaziantep Gençlik	20–25	21–25	23–25			64–75	Report
18 Jan 26	14.00	İstanbul Gençlik	3–0	İstanbul Bş. Bld.	25–21	25–18	25–18			75–57	Report
18 Jan 26	14.00	Spor Toto	3–1	Fenerbahçe	25–19	25–27	25–23	25–23		100–92	Report
18 Jan 26	16.30	Galatasaray	3–0	Halkbank	25–23	25–20	25–18			75–61	Report

Date	Time		Score		Set 1	Set 2	Set 3	Set 4	Set 5	Total	Report
Week 16
25 Jan 26	14.00	Fenerbahçe	–	Cizre Belediyespor							Not played
25 Jan 26	14.00	Ziraat Bankkart	3–0	Bursa Belediye Spor	25–18	25–20	25–19			75–57	Report
25 Jan 26	16.00	Akkuş Belediyespor	0–3	İstanbul Gençlik	23–25	22–25	19–25			64–75	Report
25 Jan 26	16.00	Gaziantep Gençlik	0–3	Galatasaray	21–25	16–25	18–25			55–75	Report
25 Jan 26	16.30	Gebze Belediyespor	0–3	Spor Toto	20–25	32–34	25–27			77–86	Report
25 Jan 26	16.30	İstanbul Bş. Bld.	0–3	Alanya Belediyespor	22–25	18–25	17–25			57–75	Report
25 Jan 26	19.00	Halkbank	3–0	Altekma	25–23	25–20	25–21			75–64	Report

Date	Time		Score		Set 1	Set 2	Set 3	Set 4	Set 5	Total	Report
Week 17
01 Feb 26	14.00	Alanya Belediyespor	3–1	Akkuş Belediyespor	25–16	25–22	21–25	25–23		96–86	Report
01 Feb 26	14.00	Galatasaray	3–2	İstanbul Bş. Bld.	22–25	25–21	34–36	25–21	15–10	121–113	Report
01 Feb 26	14.00	İstanbul Gençlik	3–1	Fenerbahçe	26–24	23–25	28–26	25–21		102–96	Report
01 Feb 26	15.00	Altekma	3–0	Gaziantep Gençlik	25–19	25–19	26–24			76–62	Report
01 Feb 26	15.00	Bursa Belediye Spor	1–3	Halkbank	23–25	22–25	25–23	20–25		90–98	Report
01 Feb 26	16.30	Spor Toto	3–1	Ziraat Bankkart	19–25	25–16	25–21	25–22		94–84	Report
		Cizre Belediyespor	-	Gebze Belediyespor							Not played

Date	Time		Score		Set 1	Set 2	Set 3	Set 4	Set 5	Total	Report
Week 18
07 Feb 26	14.00	Akkuş Belediyespor	2–3	Galatasaray	19–25	28–26	25–23	17–25	9–15	98–114	Report
08 Feb 26	19.00	Fenerbahçe	3–2	Alanya Belediyespor	20–25	25–22	22–25	25–23	15–10	107–105	Report
08 Feb 26	14.00	Gaziantep Gençlik	1–3	Halkbank	25–22	28–30	18–25	18–25		89–102	Report
08 Feb 26	15.00	Gebze Belediyespor	3–2	İstanbul Gençlik	25–19	25–20	21–25	16–25	15–12	102–101	Report
08 Feb 26	16.30	İstanbul Bş. Bld.	1–3	Altekma	25–22	20–25	19–25	19–25		83–97	Report
08 Feb 26	14.00	Spor Toto	2–3	Bursa Belediye Spor	28–30	20–25	27–25	25–14	12–15	112–109	Report
		Ziraat Bankkart	-	Cizre Belediyespor							Not played

Date	Time		Score		Set 1	Set 2	Set 3	Set 4	Set 5	Total	Report
Week 19
15 Feb 26	14.00	Alanya Belediyespor	2–3	Gebze Belediyespor	25–20	14–25	15–25	28–26	13–15	95–111	Report
15 Feb 26	14.00	İstanbul Gençlik	1–3	Ziraat Bankkart	18–25	25–22	21–25	17–25		81–97	Report
15 Feb 26	15.00	Altekma	3–0	Akkuş Belediyespor	25–18	25–20	25–22			75–60	Report
15 Feb 26	16.00	Bursa Belediye Spor	3–1	Gaziantep Gençlik	25–23	23–25	25–21	25–18		98–87	Report
15 Feb 26	16.00	Halkbank	3–0	İstanbul Bş. Bld.	25–22	25–21	25–19			75–62	Report
15 Feb 26	16.30	Galatasaray	0–3	Fenerbahçe	21–25	19–25	19–25			59–75	Report
		Cizre Belediyespor	-	Spor Toto							Not played

Date	Time		Score		Set 1	Set 2	Set 3	Set 4	Set 5	Total	Report
Week 20
22 Feb 26	13.00	Spor Toto	3–1	İstanbul Gençlik	23–25	25–22	25–21	25–22		98–90	Report
22 Feb 26	14.00	Akkuş Belediyespor	0–3	Halkbank	16–25	15–25	22–25			53–75	Report
22 Feb 26	14.00	Gebze Belediyespor	0–3	Galatasaray	20–25	23–25	29–31			72–81	Report
22 Feb 26	16.00	Ziraat Bankkart	3–1	Alanya Belediyespor	25–13	25–20	22–25	25–17		97–75	Report
22 Feb 26	16.30	İstanbul Bş. Bld.	3–1	Gaziantep Gençlik	25–23	23–25	25–18	25–22		98–88	Report
22 Feb 26	20.00	Fenerbahçe	3–0	Altekma	25–20	26–24	25–17			76–61	Report
		Cizre Belediyespor	-	Bursa Belediye Spor							Not played

Date	Time		Score		Set 1	Set 2	Set 3	Set 4	Set 5	Total	Report
Week 21
25 Feb 26	15.00	Gaziantep Gençlik	3–0	Akkuş Belediyespor	25–22	25–22	28–26			78–70	Report
25 Feb 26	15.00	Halkbank	3–0	Fenerbahçe	25–23	27–25	25–20			77–68	Report
25 Feb 26	16.00	Alanya Belediyespor	2–3	Spor Toto	25–23	20–25	25–21	21–25	10–15	101–109	Report
25 Feb 26	16.00	Altekma	3–1	Gebze Belediyespor	22–25	25–21	25–17	25–22		97–85	Report
25 Feb 26	16.00	Bursa Belediye Spor	3–1	İstanbul Bş. Bld.	25–19	25–27	25–20	25–20		100–86	Report
26 Feb 26	20.00	Galatasaray	0–3	Ziraat Bankkart	17–25	21–25	22–25			60–75	Report
		İstanbul Gençlik	-	Cizre Belediyespor							Not played

Date	Time		Score		Set 1	Set 2	Set 3	Set 4	Set 5	Total	Report
Week 22
01 Mar 26	13.00	Spor Toto	3–0	Galatasaray	25–17	25–19	29–27			79–63	Report
01 Mar 26	14.00	Akkuş Belediyespor	3–1	İstanbul Bş. Bld.	22–25	25–23	25–19	25–20		97–87	Report
01 Mar 26	14.00	Gebze Belediyespor	0–3	Halkbank	20–25	23–25	21–25			64–75	Report
01 Mar 26	14.00	İstanbul Gençlik	3–0	Bursa Belediye Spor	25–20	25–18	31–29			81–67	Report
01 Mar 26	16.00	Fenerbahçe	2–3	Gaziantep Gençlik	20–25	25–18	20–25	25–14	14–16	104–98	Report
01 Mar 26	16.00	Ziraat Bankkart	3–0	Altekma	25–18	25–13	25–19			75–50	Report
		Cizre Belediyespor	-	Alanya Belediyespor							Not played

Date	Time		Score		Set 1	Set 2	Set 3	Set 4	Set 5	Total	Report
Week 23
08 Mar 26	13.00	Bursa Belediye Spor	3–1	Akkuş Belediyespor	25–18	25–19	32–34	25–23		107–94	Report
08 Mar 26	14.00	Alanya Belediyespor	2–3	İstanbul Gençlik	25–22	25–23	20–25	19–25	10–15	99–110	Report
08 Mar 26	16.00	Altekma	2–3	Spor Toto	25–23	19–25	18–25	25–23	13–15	100–111	Report
08 Mar 26	16.00	Gaziantep Gençlik	0–3	Gebze Belediyespor	22–25	23–25	20–25			65–75	Report
08 Mar 26	16.00	Halkbank	1–3	Ziraat Bankkart	25–21	26–28	24–26	24–26		99–101	Report
08 Mar 26	16.30	İstanbul Bş. Bld.	0–3	Fenerbahçe	22–25	27–29	24–26			73–80	Report
		Galatasaray	-	Cizre Belediyespor							Not played

Date	Time		Score		Set 1	Set 2	Set 3	Set 4	Set 5	Total	Report
Week 24
15 Mar 26	13.00	Alanya Belediyespor	2–3	Bursa Belediye Spor	25–20	25–23	22–25	19–25	11–15	102–108	Report
15 Mar 26	13.00	Spor Toto	2–3	Halkbank	25–21	21–25	25–22	18–25	12–15	101–108	Report
15 Mar 26	14.00	Gebze Belediyespor	3–0	İstanbul Bş. Bld.	25–22	25–22	25–16			75–60	Report
15 Mar 26	14.00	İstanbul Gençlik	2–3	Galatasaray	30–28	18–25	28–30	25–23	19–21	120–127	Report
15 Mar 26	16.00	Fenerbahçe	3–1	Akkuş Belediyespor	25–21	23–25	25–18	25–15		98–79	Report
15 Mar 26	16.00	Ziraat Bankkart	3–0	Gaziantep Gençlik	25–23	25–10	25–22			75–55	Report
		Cizre Belediyespor	-	Altekma							Not played

Date	Time		Score		Set 1	Set 2	Set 3	Set 4	Set 5	Total	Report
Week 25
18 Mar 26	16.00	Akkuş Belediyespor	1–3	Gebze Belediyespor	25–21	22–25	22–25	22–25		91–96	Report
18 Mar 26	16.00	Altekma	1–3	İstanbul Gençlik	19–25	21–25	25–20	18–25		83–95	Report
18 Mar 26	16.00	Bursa Belediye Spor	3–1	Fenerbahçe	18–25	25–17	25–21	25–23		93–86	Report
18 Mar 26	16.00	Galatasaray	3–1	Alanya Belediyespor	25–18	25–17	23–25	25–23		98–83	Report
18 Mar 26	16.00	Gaziantep Gençlik	0–3	Spor Toto	27–29	32–34	21–25			80–88	Report
18 Mar 26	16.30	İstanbul Bş. Bld.	2–3	Ziraat Bankkart	16–25	24–26	25–19	25–22	11–15	101–107	Report
		Halkbank	-	Cizre Belediyespor							Not played

Date	Time		Score		Set 1	Set 2	Set 3	Set 4	Set 5	Total	Report
Week 26
22 Mar 26	14.00	Alanya Belediyespor	1–3	Altekma	25–22	18–25	23–25	17–25		83–97	Report
22 Mar 26	14.00	Galatasaray	3–0	Bursa Belediye Spor	25–21	25–22	25–21			75–64	Report
22 Mar 26	14.00	Gebze Belediyespor	0–3	Fenerbahçe	20–25	23–25	16–25			59–75	Report
22 Mar 26	14.00	İstanbul Gençlik	3–1	Halkbank	25–22	25–16	25–27	25–23		100–88	Report
22 Mar 26	17.00	Spor Toto	3–2	İstanbul Bş. Bld.	25–27	25–14	27–29	25–18	15–8	117–96	Report
22 Mar 26	14.00	Ziraat Bankkart	3–0	Akkuş Belediyespor	25–0	25–0	25–0			75–0	Report
		Cizre Belediyespor	-	Gaziantep Gençlik							Not played
