= Samuel Tuia =

French volleyball player (born 1986)

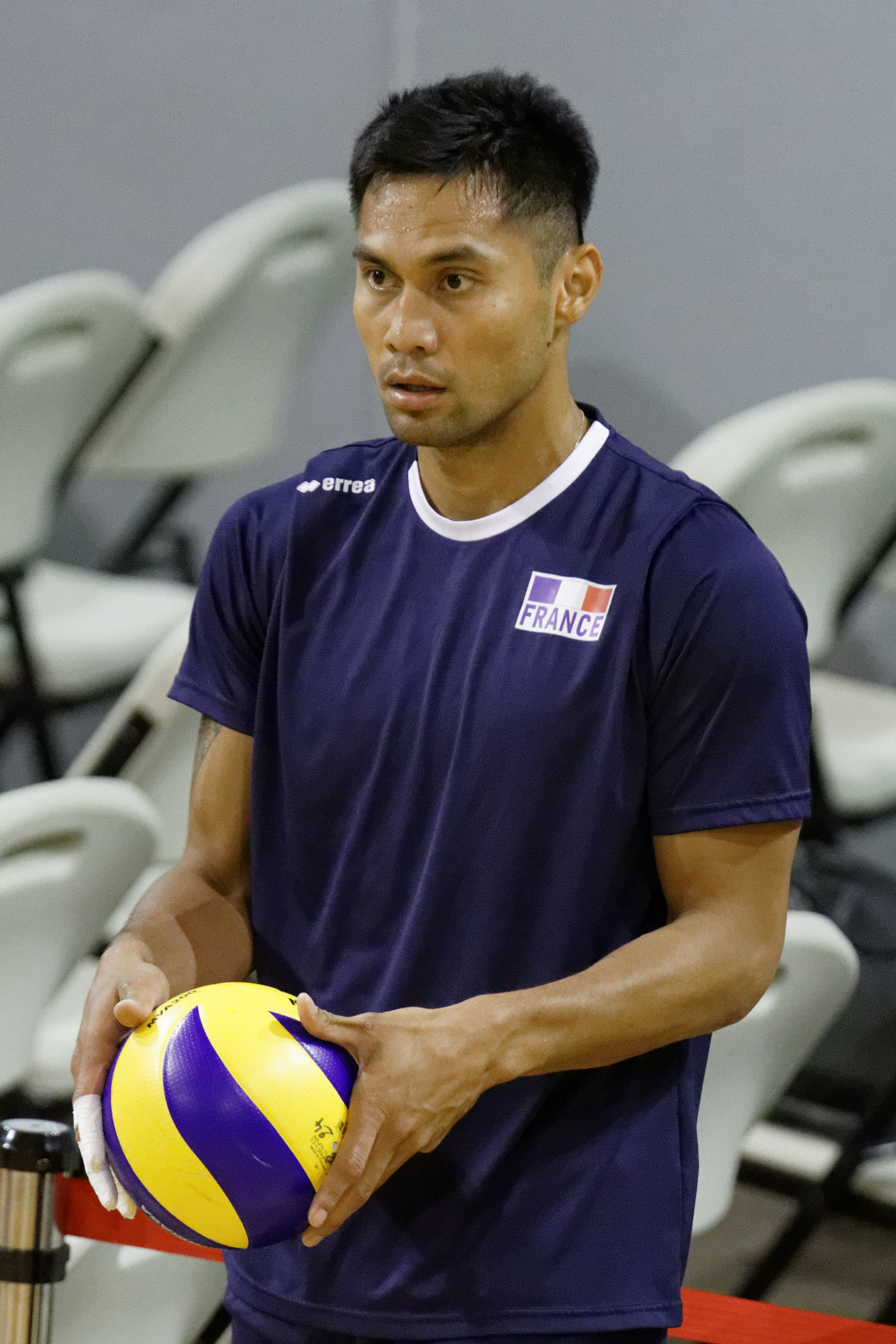

Personal information
- Full name: Samuel Tuia
- Nationality: French
- Born: July 24, 1986 (age 40); Mata Utu, France
- Height: 1.95 m (6 ft 5 in)
- Weight: 95 kg (209 lb)
- Spike: 345 cm (136 in)
- Block: 325 cm (128 in)

Volleyball information
- Position: Outside hitter
- Current team: İstanbul Büyükşehir Belediyesi

Career
| Years | Teams |
|---|---|
| 2003–2005; 2005–2008; 2008–2010; 2010–2011; 2011–2013; 2013–2014; 2014–2015; 2015–2016; 2016–2017; 2017– | Centre National du VB; Rennes Volley 35; AS Cannes Volley-Ball; Indykpol AZS Olsztyn; Kuzbass Kemerovo; PGE Skra Bełchatów; Galatasaray İstanbul; Beşiktaş İstanbul; Galatasaray İstanbul; İstanbul Büyükşehir Belediyesi |

National team
| 2008– | France |
Honours
Representing France
Men's volleyball
European Championship
| Silver medal – second place | 2009 Turkey |
- Last updated: 1 January 2018

Samuel Tuia (born 24 July 1986) is a French volleyball player, a member of France men's national volleyball team and Turkish club İstanbul Büyükşehir Belediyesi, a silver medalist of the European Championship 2009, Polish Champion (2014).

== Career ==
=== Clubs ===
Season 2013/2014 spent in Polish club - PGE Skra Bełchatów, Polish Champion 2013/2014. In July 2014 moved to Turkish club Galatasaray FXTCR.

=== National team ===
He debuted in French national team in 2008. He won silver medal of European Championship 2009.

== Sporting achievements ==
=== Clubs ===
==== National championships ====
- 2009/2010 French Championship, with AS Cannes Volley-Ball
- 2013/2014 Polish Championship, with PGE Skra Bełchatów

=== National team ===
- 2009 CEV European Championship
