= Dick Kooy =

Dutch volleyball player

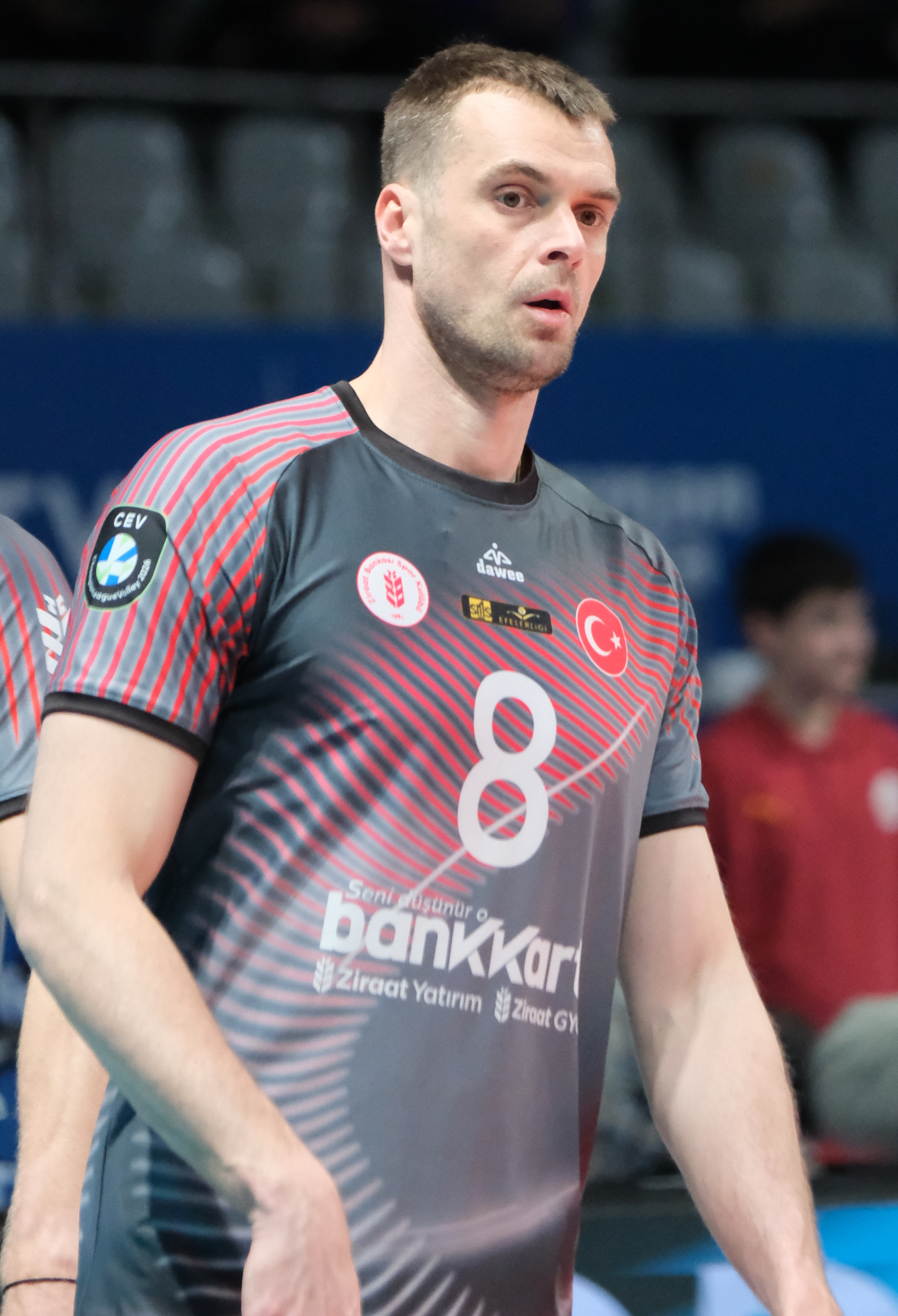

Personal information
- Born: 3 December 1987 (age 38); Amsterdam, Netherlands
- Height: 2.02 m (6 ft 8 in)
- Weight: 90 kg (198 lb)
- Spike: 360 cm (142 in)
- Block: 340 cm (134 in)

Volleyball information
- Position: Outside hitter
- Current club: Ziraat Bankasi

Career
Years	Teams
2005–2007; 2007–2009; 2009–2012; 2012–2013; 2013–2015; 2015; 2015–2017; 2017–2019; 2019–2020; 2020–2021; 2021–2023; 2023–2024; 2024; 2024–2025; 2025–2026	Omniworld Almere; Ortec Nesselande; Modena Volley; Volley Lube; ZAKSA Kędzierzyn-Koźle; El Jaish; Halkbank Ankara; Dynamo Moscow; Gas Sales Piacenza; Trentino Volley; Skra Bełchatów; Fenerbahçe; Police Union; Halkbank Ankara; Ural Ufa; Ziraat Bankasi

National team
2008–2015; 2019	Netherlands; Italy

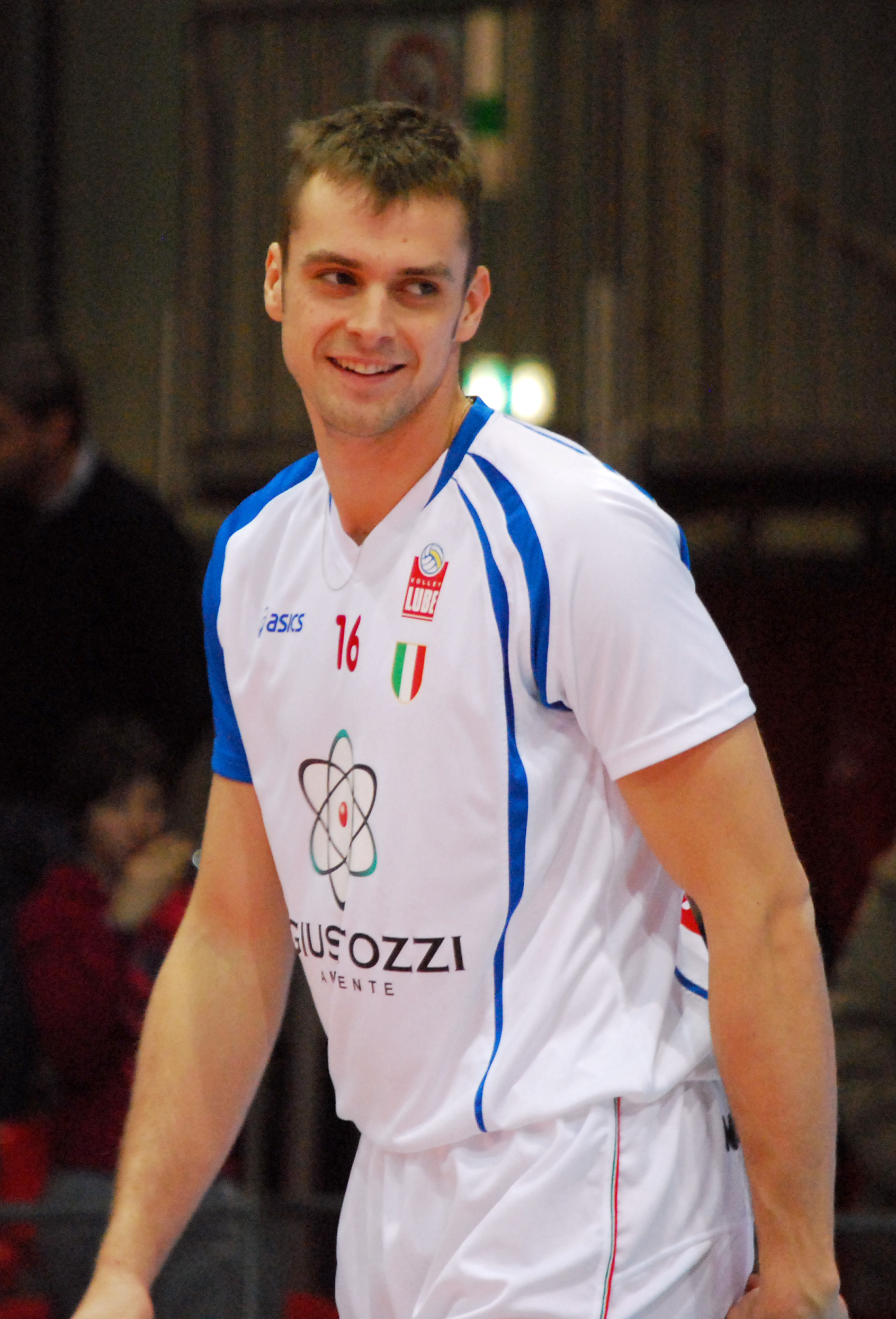

Dick Kooy (born 3 December 1987 Amsterdam) is a Dutch professional volleyball player with Italian citizenship who plays as an outside hitter for Ziraat Bankasi. He competed for Italy in the 2019 World Cup and represented the Netherlands in the past.

== Honours ==
=== Club ===
- CEV Champions League
  - 2020–21 – with Itas Trentino
- Domestic
  - 2008–09 Dutch SuperCup, with Ortec Nesselande
  - 2008–09 Dutch Championship, with Ortec Nesselande
  - 2012–13 Italian SuperCup, with Cucine Lube Banca Marche Macerata
  - 2012–13 Italian Championship, with Cucine Lube Banca Marche Macerata
  - 2013–14 Polish Cup, with ZAKSA Kędzierzyn-Koźle
  - 2015–16 Turkish SuperCup, with Halkbank Ankara
  - 2015–16 Turkish Championship, with Halkbank Ankara
  - 2016–17 Turkish Championship, with Halkbank Ankara

=== Individual awards ===
- 2014: Polish Cup – Best server

=== Statistics ===
- 2013–14 PlusLiga – Best spiker (402 points)
