= Kévin Le Roux =

French volleyball player (born 1989)

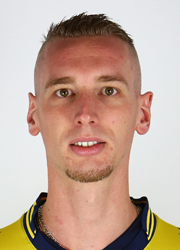

Personal information
- Nationality: (France) French
- Born: 11 May 1989 (age 37); Champigny-sur-Marne, France
- Height: 2.09 m (6 ft 10 in)
- Weight: 97 kg (214 lb)
- Spike: 365 cm (144 in)
- Block: 345 cm (136 in)

Volleyball information
- Position: Middle blocker / Opposite
- Current club: (Germany) Berlin Recycling Volleys
- Number: 2

Career
Years	Teams
2009–2013; 2013–2014; 2014–2015; 2015–2016; 2016–2017; 2017; 2017–2018; 2018–2019; 2019–2020; 2020–2021	(France) AS Cannes (Italy) Volley Piacenza (South Korea) Cheonan Skywalkers (Turkey) Halkbank Ankara (Italy) Modena Volley (Russia) Dynamo Moscow (France) Rennes Volley 35 (Brazil) Sada Cruzeiro (China) Beijing BAIC Motor (Germany) Berlin Recycling Volleys

National team
2010–	France
Honours
Men's volleyball
Representing France
FIVB World League
Gold medal – first place	2015 Rio de Janeiro
Gold medal – first place	2017 Curitiba
Bronze medal – third place	2016 Kraków
FIVB Nations League
Silver medal – second place	2018 Lille
CEV European Championship
Gold medal – first place	2015 Bulgaria/Italy

Kévin Le Roux (born 11 May 1989) is a French volleyball player, member of the France men's national volleyball team and German club Berlin Recycling Volleys, 2015 European Champion, two–time gold medallist of the World League (2015, 2017), Turkish Champion (2016).

== Career ==
=== National team ===
In 2014 played at World Championship 2014 held in Poland. France lost the match for the bronze medal with Germany and took 4th place. On October 18, 2015 French national team, including him, achieved title of the European Champion 2015 (3–0 with Slovenia in the finale).

== Personal life ==
He is married to American volleyball player Cursty Jackson.

== Sporting achievements ==
=== Clubs ===
- CSV South American Club Championship
  - Belo Horizonte 2019 – with Sada Cruzeiro
- National championships
  - 2013/2014 Italian Cup, with Copra Elior Piacenza
  - 2015/2016 Turkish SuperCup, with Halkbank Ankara
  - 2015/2016 Turkish Championship, with Halkbank Ankara
  - 2016/2017 Italian SuperCup, with Azimut Modena
  - 2018/2019 Brazilian Cup, with Sada Cruzeiro

=== Youth national team ===
- 2006 CEV U20 European Championship
- 2007 CEV U19 European Championship
- 2008 CEV U20 European Championship

=== Individual awards ===
- 2015: Turkish SuperCup – Most Valuable Player
- 2017: FIVB World League – Best Middle Blocker
- 2018: FIVB Nations League – Best Middle Blocker
