= Spor Toto SK (men's volleyball) =

Turkish professional volleyball team

- Full name: Spor Toto Spor Kulübü
- Founded: 2019; 7 years ago
- Ground: Başkent Volleyball Hall
- Manager: (Turkey) Nedim Özbey
- League: Turkish Men's Volleyball League
- 2024–25: 7th

Spor Toto SK Volleyball is the professional men's volleyball team of the Ankara-based Turkish sports club Spor Toto SK. They play in the Turkish Men's Volleyball League.

== History ==
The Spor Toto men's volleyball team was renamed from the Maliye Piyango men's volleyball team when the club was transferred to Spor Toto Organization in the summer of 2019. The team won the 2020–21 Turkish Men's Volleyball Cup.

Head coach is Nedim Özbey. e team finished the 2024–25 Turkish Men's Volleyball League in the 7th place.

== Colors ==
The club colors are red, black and white.

== Arena ==
The team plays their home matches in the Başkent Volleyball Hall in Ankara.

== Roster ==
As of 20255–26 season.

- Head coach: (Turkey) Nedim Özbey

No.	Player	D.O.B.	Height (m)	Position
2	(Cuba) Oreol Camejo	22 July 1986 (age 40)	2.07	Outside hitter
3	(Turkey) Melih Sıratça	18 February 1996 (age 30)	1.95	Outside hitter
7	(Turkey) Orçun Ergün	24 May 1992 (age 34)	1.95	Setter
8	(Serbia) Marko Ivović (C)	22 December 1990 (age 35)	1.94	Outside hitter
9	(Turkey) Hakkı Çapkınoğlu	20 July 1990 (age 36)	2.05	Middle blocker
10	(Turkey) Mustafa Koç	23 February 1992 (age 34)	2.02	Middle blocker
11	(Turkey) Beytullah Hatipoğlu	24 February 1992 (age 34)	1.90	Libero
12	(Turkey) Emin Gök	15 February 1988 (age 38)	2.02	Middle blocker
15	(Turkey) Kaan Bülbül	14 July 2001 (age 25)	2.01	Middle blocker
16	(Turkey) Burak Mert	23 October 1990 (age 36)	1.95	Libero
17	(Turkey) Muhammed Kaya	7 February 1995 (age 31)	1.90	Setter
18	(Turkey) İzzet Ünver	1 January 1992 (age 34)	1.96	Outside hitter
19	(Turkey) Mehmet Ege Biber	8 January 2007 (age 19)	2.02	Outside hitter
74	(Cuba) Jesus Herrera Jaime	4 April 1995 (age 31)	1.96	Opposite hitter

== Honours ==
Turkish Men's Volleyball Cup
Winners (1): 2020–21.
