= Faik Samet Güneş =

Turkish volleyball player (born 1993)

Personal information
- Nationality: Turkish
- Born: 27 May 1993 (age 33); Tokat, Turkey
- Height: 2.05 m (6 ft 9 in)
- Weight: 103 kg (227 lb)
- Spike: 342 cm (135 in)
- Block: 339 cm (133 in)

Volleyball information
- Position: Middle blocker
- Current club: Galatasaray
- Number: 14

Career
Years	Teams
2011–2013; 2013–2014; 2014–2021; 2021–2025; 2025–	Halkbank Ankara; Maliye Milli Piyango; Halkbank Ankara; Ziraat Bankası; Galatasaray

National team
2015–	Turkey

Faik Samet Güneş (born 27 May 1993) is a Turkish male volleyball player. He is part of the Turkey men's national volleyball team. On the club level he plays for Galatasaray.

== Club career ==
He signed a 2-year contract with Galatasaray on May 27, 2025.

== Sporting achievements ==
=== Clubs ===
==== National championships ====
- 2015/2016 Turkish SuperCup 2015, with Halkbank Ankara
- 2015/2016 Turkish Championship, with Halkbank Ankara
