= Resul Tekeli =

Turkish volleyball player (born 1986)

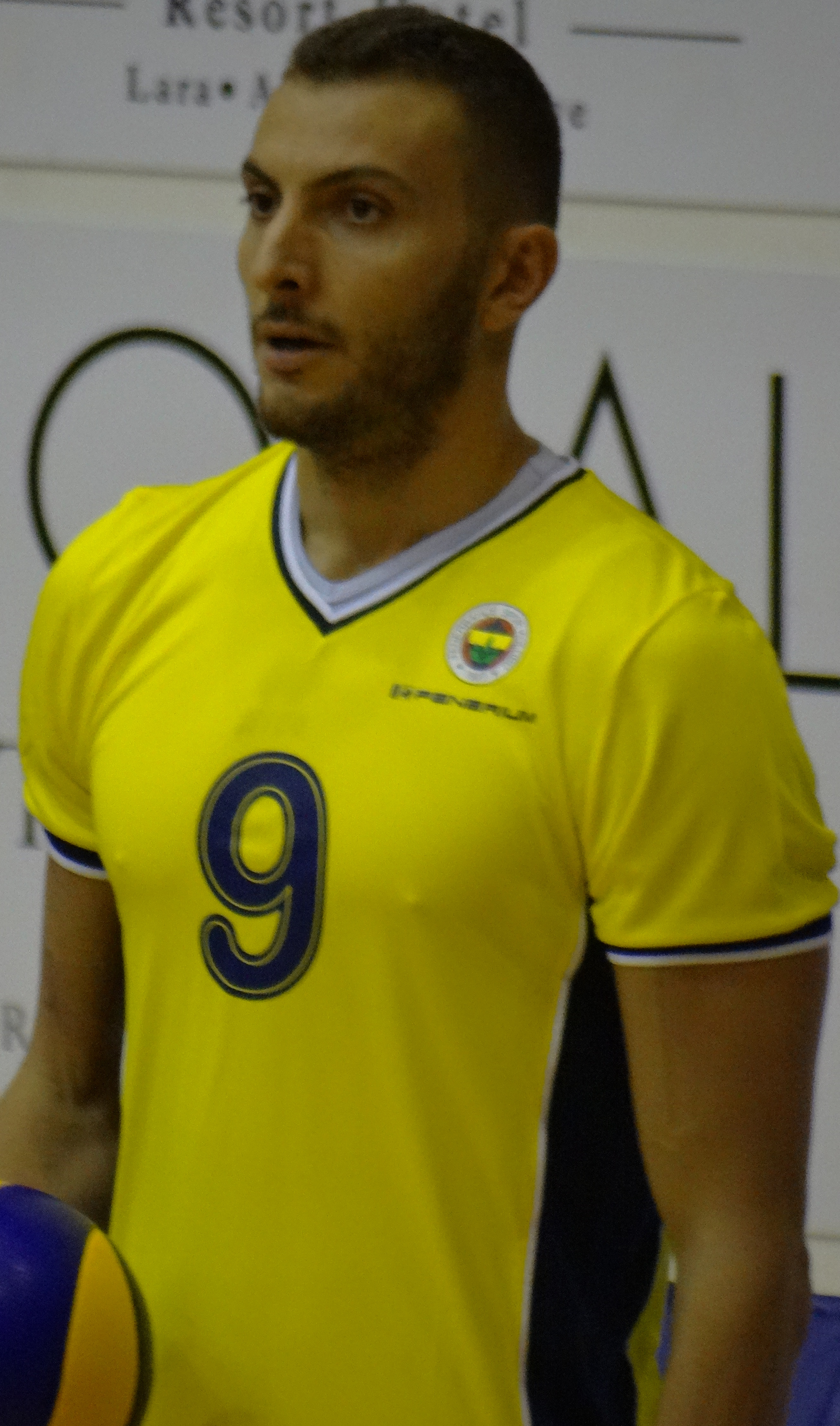

Personal information
- Nationality: Turkish
- Born: September 16, 1986 (age 40); Istanbul, Turkey
- Height: 2.03 m (6 ft 8 in)

Volleyball information
- Current club: Halkbank Ankara

Career
Years
- 2006-07
- 2007-08
- 2008-11
Teams
- Arçelik (on loan)
- Fenerbahçe
- Ziraat Bankası

National team
Turkey
- Last updated: September 5, 2013

Resul Tekeli (born September 16, 1986) is a Turkish volleyball player. He is 2.03 m (6 ft 8 in) tall. Since the 2011–12 season, he plays for Halkbank Ankara.

He started playing volleyball in the junior's team of Fenerbahçe, and was loaned out to Arçelik in the 2006–07 season. The next season, he returned to his main and wore the jersey number 5. In the 2008–09 season, he transferred to Ziraat Bankası before signing for Halkbank Ankara in 2011. He is a regular member of the Turkey men's national volleyball team.

Tekeli became runner-up with Ziraatbankası at the 2009–10 Turkish Men's Volleyball League and was honored with "Payidar Demir Award". He won the Men's CEV Cup 2012–13 with Halkbank Ankara and was named "Best Blocker" of the tournament.

== Sporting achievements ==
=== Clubs ===
==== CEV Cup ====
- 2012/2013 – with Halkbank Ankara

==== National championships ====
- 2009/2010 Turkish Championship, with Ziraat Bankası Ankara
- 2015/2016 Turkish SuperCup 2015, with Halkbank Ankara
- 2015/2016 Turkish Championship, with Halkbank Ankara
