= Jelena Pirsl =

Croatian handball player (born 1985)

Personal information
- Nationality: Croatian
- Born: 28 October 1985 (age 40) Rijeka, SR Croatia, SFR Yugoslavia
- Height: 1.74 m (5 ft 9 in)

Sport
- Sport: Handball
- Position: Goalkeeper
- Current club: Ardeşen GSK
- Number: 22
National team
- Years: Team
- –: Croatia

Jelena Pirsl (born 28 October 1985) is a Croatian handballer playing for Ardeşen GSK and the Croatian national team. The 1.74 m (5 ft 9 in)-tall sportswoman plays in the goalkeeper position.

Between 2010 and 2012, she played for Maliye Milli Piyango SK before she joined Ardeşen GSK in 2014.
