= Mikko Esko =

Finnish volleyball player (born 1978)

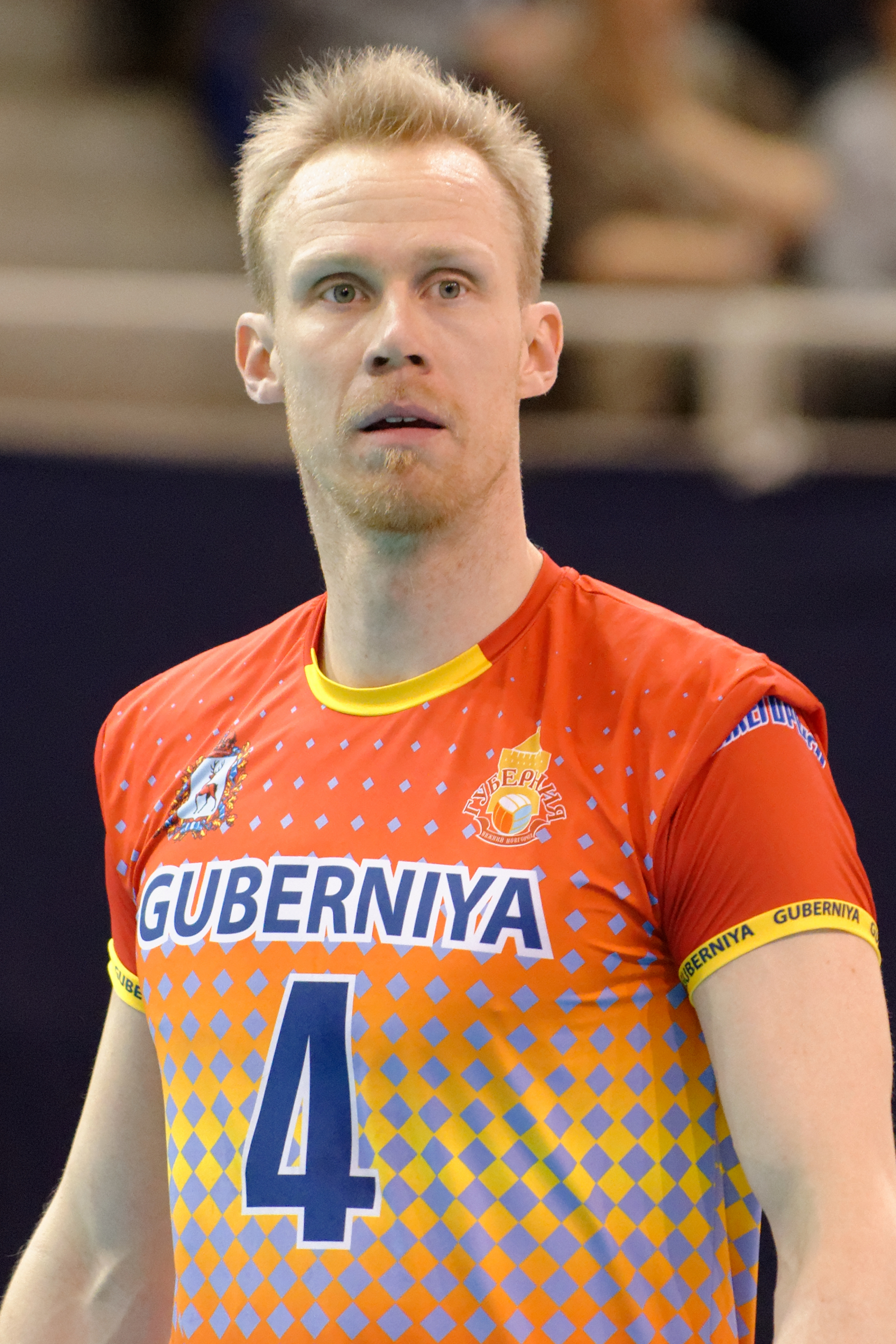

Personal information
- Full name: Mikko Esko
- Nationality: Finnish
- Born: September 3, 1978 (age 48); Vammala, Finland
- Height: 1.98 m (6 ft 6 in)
- Weight: 89 kg (196 lb)
- Spike: 331 cm (130 in)
- Block: 319 cm (126 in)

Coaching information
Previous teams coached
Years	Teams
2024–	Finland (assistant coach)

Volleyball information
- Position: Setter
- Current club: ACH Volley Ljubljana
- Number: 7

Career
Years	Teams
1995–1997; 1997–2001; 2001–2003; 2003–2005; 2005–2008; 2008–2009; 2009–2012; 2012–2014; 2014–2015; 2015–2024; 2024–	Vammalan Lentopallo; Keski-Savon Pateri; Generali Unterhaching; Noliko Maaseik; Sempre Voley; Acqua Paradiso Montichiari; Trenkwalder Modena; Guberniya Nizhny Novgorod; Halkbank Ankara; Vammalan Lentopallo; ACH Volley Ljubljana

National team
2000–	Finland
- Last updated: 29 December 2017

Mikko Esko (born 3 September 1978) is a Finnish volleyball player, a member of Finland men's national volleyball team and Finnish club Vammalan Lentopallo.

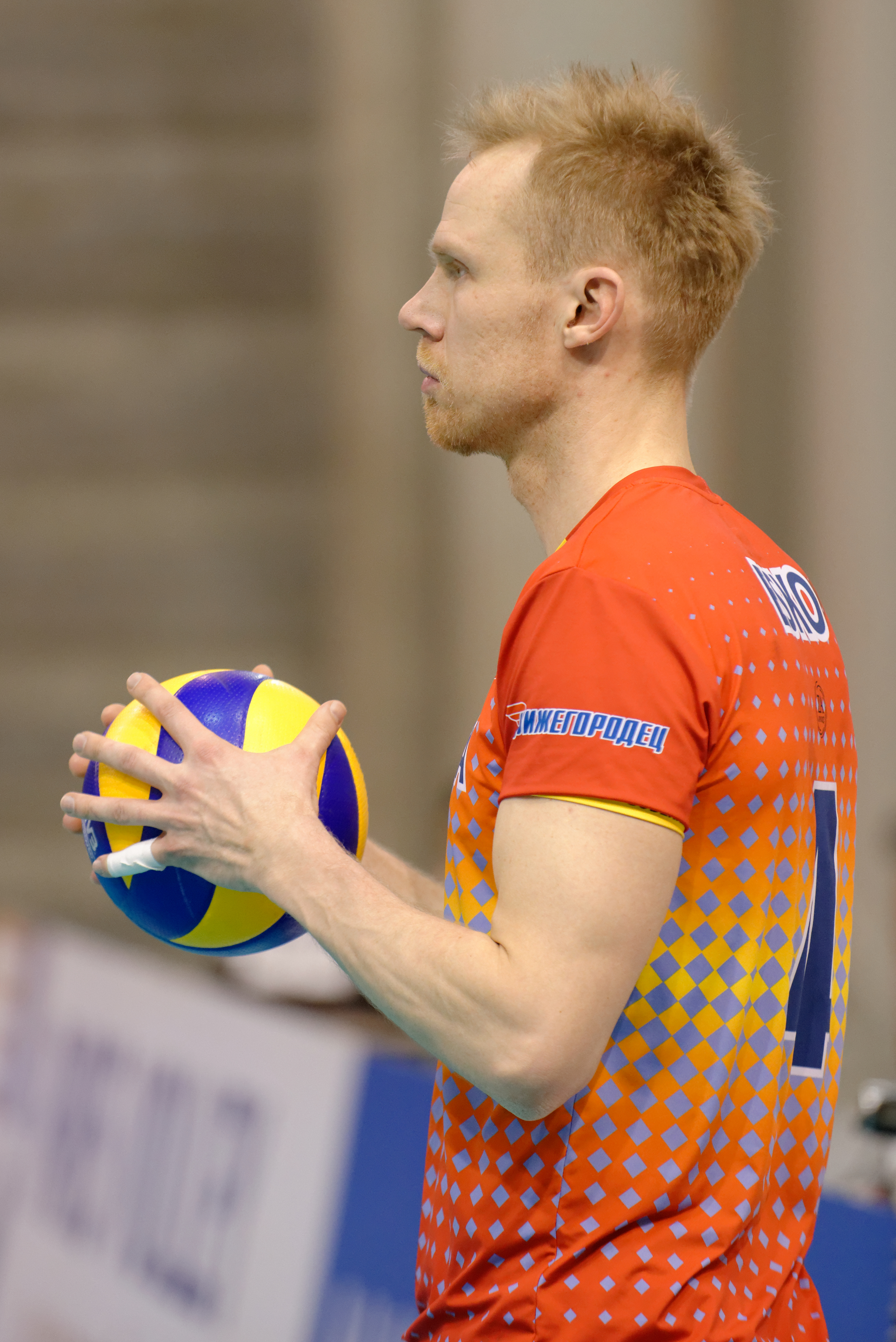
Esko during the final of the CEV Cup 2014 against Paris Volley on March 29, 2014.

== Personal life ==
Esko was born in Vammala, Finland. He is married to Saara (née Loikkanen), who is a former volleyball player.

== Career ==
=== Clubs ===
Esko started his career in Vammala. There he played his first season in professional level in Finland with Vammalan Lentopallo. He played in Vammalan Lentopallo seasons 1995–1997. After that he changed to Keski-Savon Pateri. His first season in Pateri he won Finland league bronze. After the season the media chose him as best rookie player in the league. Second season was also success to Esko in Pateri. He won Finland league Champion and also Finland Cup Champion. Season 1999 Esko won with Pateri Finland league bronze.

After that he became professional volleyball player. He made contract with Unterhachingin who played in German Bundesliga. He won German league bronze season 2000 and next season that he won German Cup Champion. After two season he made contract with Noliko Maaseik in Belgium. First season was success in Maaseik to Esko. He win Belgium league Champion and also Belgium Cup Champion. Season 2005 he won with Maaseik Belgium Cup Champion and league silver medals.

After two years in Belgium Esko made a three-year contract with Sempre Volley Padova. The media chose his season 2006–2008 Italy league All-Stars game. Season 2008–2009 Esko play in Acqua Paradiso Gabeca Montichiari. After the season Trenkwalder Modena bought Esko to their team from Monticari. In 2012 he changed the club and moved to Russian league (Guberniya Nizhny Novgorod).

=== National team ===
Esko played his first national team game against Estonian year 2000. Then Esko was 22 years old. He made his breakthrough in national team year 2004, when he got one setter place in the team. Today Esko is reserve captain in national team. Tuomas Sammelvuo is team captain usually. Year 2006 Esko played with national team his first World league season. Finland placed 11. place in World League and also survive to European Championships to Moscow.

Summer 2007 Esko played again in World League with Finland. They played good competition and place seven place final. After that team started five weeks longer preparing to European Championships. In European Championships Finland made country ballgames history when team get fourth place.

== Sporting achievements ==
=== Clubs ===
==== National championships ====
- 2014/2015 Turkish SuperCup2014, with Halkbank Ankara
- 2014/2015 Turkish Cup, with Halkbank Ankara
- 2014/2015 Turkish Championship, with Halkbank Ankara

Personals:

- Italy league All-Star player 2006, 2007, 2008
- Best Finnish maleplayer of the year 2006, 2008
- Best newcomer in Finland league 1998

Team:

- 4. place in European Championships 2007
- Belgium Champion 2004
- Belgium Cup-Champion 2004, 2005
- German Cup-Champion 2003
- German league bronze 2002
- Finland Champion 1999
- Finland league bronze 1998, 2000

In beach-volley:

- Finland Champion 2001, 2003
