= Mustafa Koç (volleyball) =

Turkish volleyball player (born 1992)

Personal information
- Nationality: Turkish
- Born: 23 February 1992 (age 34)

Volleyball information
- Position: central
- Number: 22 (national team)

Career
Years	Teams
2015	(Turkey) Arkas Izmir

National team
2015	Turkey

Mustafa Koç (born 23 February 1992) is a Turkish male volleyball player. He is part of the Turkey men's national volleyball team. He competed at the 2015 European Games in Baku. On club level he plays for Arkas Izmir.

== See also ==
- Turkey at the 2015 European Games
