= Turkish Men's Volleyball League =

Professional volleyball league in Turkey

Efeler Ligi
- Current season, competition or edition: 2026–27 Turkish Men's Volleyball League
- Sport: Volleyball
- Founded: 1970; 56 years ago
- Administrator: Turkish Volleyball Federation
- No. of teams: 14
- Country: Turkey
- Confederation: CEV
- Continent: Europe
- Most recent champion: Ziraat Bankası (5th title) (2025–26)
- Most titles: Eczacıbaşı (12 titles)
- Broadcaster: TRT Spor
- Relegation to: Turkish Men's Volleyball First League
- Domestic cups: Turkish Cup; Turkish SuperCup
- International cups: CEV Champions League; CEV Cup; CEV Challenge Cup
- Website: tvf.org.tr

Efeler Ligi, known for sponsorship reasons as AXA Sigorta Efeler Ligi, is the highest professional men's volleyball league in Turkey. It is run by the Turkish Volleyball Federation. Founded in 1970, the league is considered one of the top national leagues in European volleyball, as its clubs have gained significant success in European competitions.

The league succeeded the former Turkish Volleyball Championship, which was held from 1948 to 1970.

== 2022–23 season ==
Team	City	Arena
Fenerbahçe	Istanbul	Ülker Sports and Event Hall
Galatasaray	Istanbul	Taç Sports Hall
Halkbank	Ankara	Başkent Volleyball Hall
Ziraat Bankası	Ankara	Başkent Volleyball Hall
Spor Toto	Ankara	Başkent Volleyball Hall
Arkas Spor	İzmir	Atatürk Volleyball Hall
Bursa Büyükşehir Belediyespor	Osmangazi	TVF Cengiz Göllü Sports Hall
Türşad Spor Kulübü	Adilcevaz	Adilcevaz Sports Hall
Hekimoğlu Global Bursa	Nilüfer	TVF Cengiz Göllü Sports Hall
Hatay Büyükşehir Belediyespor	Antakya	Antakya Sport Hall
Develi Belediyespor	Develi	Develi Sports Hall
Cizre Belediyespor	Şırnak	Şırnak Sports Hall
Tokat Belediye Plevnespor	Tokat	Hüseyin Akbaş Sports Hall
Altekma SK	İzmir	İzmir Ataturk Sports Hall

== Performance by club ==
Team	Titles	Years won
Eczacıbaşı	12	1976, 1978, 1979, 1980, 1981, 1982, 1983, 1984, 1985, 1986, 1990, 1991
Halkbank	10	1992, 1993, 1994, 1995, 1996, 2014, 2016, 2017, 2018, 2024
Fenerbahçe	5	2008, 2010, 2011, 2012, 2019
Ziraat Bankası	5	2021, 2022, 2023, 2025, 2026
Arkas	4	2006, 2007, 2013, 2015
Galatasaray	4	1971, 1987, 1988, 1989
Erdemirspor	3	2002, 2004, 2005
Arçelik	3	2000, 2001, 2003
NETAŞ	3	1997, 1998, 1999
İETT	3	1972, 1973, 1974
İstanbul BBSK	1	2009
Boronkay	1	1977
Muhafızgücü	1	1975

== Champions ==
- 1970–71 Galatasaray
- 1971–72 İETT
- 1972–73 İETT
- 1973–74 İETT
- 1974–75 Muhafızgücü
- 1975–76 Eczacıbaşı
- 1976–77 Boronkay
- 1977–78 Eczacıbaşı
- 1978–79 Eczacıbaşı
- 1979–80 Eczacıbaşı
- 1980–81 Eczacıbaşı
- 1981–82 Eczacıbaşı
- 1982–83 Eczacıbaşı
- 1983–84 Eczacıbaşı
- 1984–85 Eczacıbaşı
- 1985–86 Eczacıbaşı
- 1986–87 Galatasaray
- 1987–88 Galatasaray
- 1988–89 Galatasaray
- 1989–90 Eczacıbaşı
- 1990–91 Eczacıbaşı
- 1991–92 Halkbank
- 1992–93 Halkbank
- 1993–94 Halkbank
- 1994–95 Halkbank
- 1995–96 Halkbank
- 1996–97 NETAŞ
- 1997–98 NETAŞ
- 1998–99 NETAŞ
- 1999–00 Arçelik
- 2000–01 Arçelik
- 2001–02 Erdemir
- 2002–03 Arçelik
- 2003–04 Erdemir
- 2004–05 Erdemir
- 2005–06 Arkas
- 2006–07 Arkas
- 2007–08 Fenerbahçe
- 2008–09 İstanbul BBSK
- 2009–10 Fenerbahçe
- 2010–11 Fenerbahçe
- 2011–12 Fenerbahçe
- 2012–13 Arkas
- 2013–14 Halkbank
- 2014–15 Arkas
- 2015–16 Halkbank
- 2016–17 Halkbank
- 2017–18 Halkbank
- 2018–19 Fenerbahçe
- 2019–20 Canceled due to the COVID-19 pandemic in Turkey
- 2020–21 Ziraat Bankası
- 2021–22 Ziraat Bankası
- 2022–23 Ziraat Bankası
- 2023–24 Halkbank
- 2024–25 Ziraat Bankası
- 2025–26 Ziraat Bankası

== Sponsorship ==
- 2016–17: Amway – Turkish Airlines – PTT – Vestel – Acıbadem Healthcare Group

== See also ==
Men's:

- Turkish Men's Volleyball League
- Turkish Men's Volleyball Cup
- Turkish Men's Volleyball Super Cup

Women's:

- Turkish Women's Volleyball League
- Turkish Women's Volleyball Cup
- Turkish Women's Volleyball Super Cup
