= Halkbank (men's volleyball) =

Turkish volleyball team based in Ankara

Halkbank Ankara
- Full name: Türkiye Halk Bankası Spor Kulübü
- Short name: Halkbank
- Founded: July 21, 1983
- Ground: Başkent Volleyball Hall (Capacity: 7,600)
- Chairman: Osman Arslan
- Manager: Radostin Stoychev
- Captain: Selçuk Keskin
- League: Efeler Ligi
- 2022–23: 2nd place
- Website: Club home page

Uniforms
Home	Away

Halkbank
Medal record

Men's volleyball

CEV Champions League
Silver medal – second place	2013/2014 Ankara	

CEV Cup
Gold medal – first place	2012/2013	

CEV Challenge Cup
Silver medal – second place	2021/2022	

Turkish Championship
Gold medal – first place	1991/1992	
Gold medal – first place	1992/1993	
Gold medal – first place	1993/1994	
Gold medal – first place	1994/1995	
Gold medal – first place	1995/1996	
Gold medal – first place	2013/2014	
Gold medal – first place	2015/2016	
Gold medal – first place	2016/2017	
Gold medal – first place	2017/2018	
Gold medal – first place	2023/2024	
Silver medal – second place	2007/2008	
Silver medal – second place	2012/2013	
Silver medal – second place	2014/2015	

Turkish Cup
Gold medal – first place	1991/1992	
Gold medal – first place	1992/1993	
Gold medal – first place	1995/1996	
Gold medal – first place	2013/2014	
Gold medal – first place	2014/2015	
Gold medal – first place	2015/2016	
Gold medal – first place	2017/2018	
Silver medal – second place	2020/2021	

Turkish SuperCup
Gold medal – first place	2013	
Gold medal – first place	2014	
Gold medal – first place	2015	
Gold medal – first place	2017	
Silver medal – second place	2018	

Halkbank Ankara is a professional men's volleyball team based in Ankara, Turkey and sponsored by the state-owned Halkbank. It was founded on 21 July 1983 as Halkbank Spor Kulübü with blue, white and red colors. Halkbank Ankara plays in the Turkish Men's Volleyball League and in the CEV Champions League.

== Team roster ==
=== 2024/2025 ===
No.	Name	Date of birth	Position
3	(Turkey) Sercan Yüksel Bıdak	June 6, 1994 (age 31)	Middle Blocker
4	(Turkey) Deniz ivgen	May 18, 1998 (age 28)	Libero
5	(Turkey) Mert Matić	May 22, 1995 (age 31)	Middle blocker
6	(Turkey) Hüseyin Batuhan Duman	May 21, 1993 (age 33)	Setter
7	(Turkey) Mirza Lagümdžija	May 18, 2001 (age 25)	Outside Hitter
8	(Turkey) Volkan Döne	February 19, 1987 (age 39)	Libero
10	(Turkey) Tuna Uzunkol	September 17, 2004 (age 21)	Middle Blocker
11	(Netherlands) Dick Kooy	December 3, 1987 (age 38)	Outside Hitter
13	(United States) Micah Maʻa	April 16, 1997 (age 29)	Setter
16	(Turkey) Berk Dilmenlar	July 29, 2004 (age 21)	Opposite
17	(Czech Republic) Marek Šotola	November 5, 1999 (age 26)	Opposite
18	(Turkey) İzzet Ünver	January 1, 1992 (age 34)	Outside Hitter
20	(Turkey) Yunus Emre Tayaz	March 20, 1998 (age 28)	Middle blocker
23	(Turkey) Yiğit Hamza Aslan	May 28, 2005 (age 21)	Outside hitter
28	(Turkey) Oğulcan Yatgın	April 28, 1997 (age 29)	Setter

2015–2016 Team
No.	Name	Date of birth	Position
1	(Turkey) Ulaş Kıyak	August 11, 1981 (age 44)	setter
2	(Turkey) Faik Samet Güneş	May 27, 1993 (age 33)	middle blocker
4	(Italy) Dragan Travica	August 28, 1986 (age 39)	setter
5	(Turkey) Hasan Yeşilbudak	January 11, 1984 (age 42)	libero
6	(Turkey) Kemal Kayhan	January 2, 1983 (age 43)	middle blocker
8	(Turkey) Burutay Subaşı	July 15, 1990 (age 35)	outside hitter
9	(Netherlands) Dick Kooy	December 3, 1987 (age 38)	outside hitter
10	(Turkey) Emre Batur	April 21, 1988 (age 38)	middle blocker
11	(Bulgaria) Tsvetan Sokolov	December 31, 1989 (age 36)	opposite
13	(Poland) Michał Kubiak	February 23, 1988 (age 38)	outside hitter
14	(France) Kévin Le Roux	May 11, 1989 (age 37)	middle blocker
15	(Turkey) Resul Tekeli	September 16, 1986 (age 39)	middle blocker
16	(Turkey) Abdullah Çam	March 30, 1997 (age 29)	outside hitter
17	(Turkey) Caner Dengin	December 15, 1987 (age 38)	libero

2014–2015 Team
No.	Name	Date of birth	Position
1	(Turkey) Ulaş Kıyak	August 11, 1981	setter
2	(Turkey) Faik Samet Güneş	May 27, 1993	middle blocker
5	(Cuba) Osmany Juantorena	August 12, 1985	outside hitter
6	(Turkey) Abdullah Çam	March 30, 1997	outside hitter
7	(Turkey) Çam Ayvazoglu	September 14, 1979	outside hitter
8	(Turkey) Burutay Subaşı	July 15, 1990	outside hitter
10	(Turkey) Emre Batur	April 21, 1988	middle blocker
11	(Bulgaria) Tsvetan Sokolov	December 31, 1989	opposite
12	(Finland) Mikko Esko	September 3, 1978	setter
13	(Poland) Michał Kubiak	February 23, 1988	outside hitter
14	(Turkey) Nuri Şahin	January 1, 1980	libero
15	(Turkey) Resul Tekeli	September 16, 1986	middle blocker
17	(Poland) Marcin Możdżonek	February 9, 1985	middle blocker

== See also ==
- Halkbank
- Turkey men's national volleyball team
