= Beşiktaş JK (men's volleyball) =

Beşiktaş
- Short name: Beşiktaş
- Ground: BJK Akatlar Arena; Istanbul, Turkey (Capacity: 3,200)
- Chairman: Ahmet Nur Çebi
- Manager: Işık Menküer
- League: Turkish Men's Volleyball League
- Website: Club home page

Beşiktaş Men’s Volleyball is the men's volleyball section of Turkish sports club Beşiktaş J.K. in Istanbul, Turkey.

== Honours ==
- Turkish Cup:
  - Winners (1): 1983–84
- Istanbul Volleyball Championship:
  - Winners (4): 1923–24, 1924–25, 1925–26, 1926–27
  - Runners-up (5): 1927–28, 1928–29, 1929–30, 1930–31, 1932–33

== Current squad ==
Squad as of May 29, 2017

Number	Player	Position	Height (m)
2	(Turkey) Batuhan Avcı	Outside hitter	?
7	(Turkey) Mustafa Alkan	Libero	1.86
8	(Turkey) Muhammet Delibaş	Hitter	1.90
9	(Turkey) Görkem Yazgan	Setter	1.97
14	(Turkey) Erhan Dünge	Middle blocker	2.08
17	(Turkey) Fırat Ezel Filiz	Hitter	1.97
18	(Turkey) Oğuzhan Altıntaş	Libero	1.87
