= Başkent Volleyball Hall =

Indoor volleyball venue in Turkey

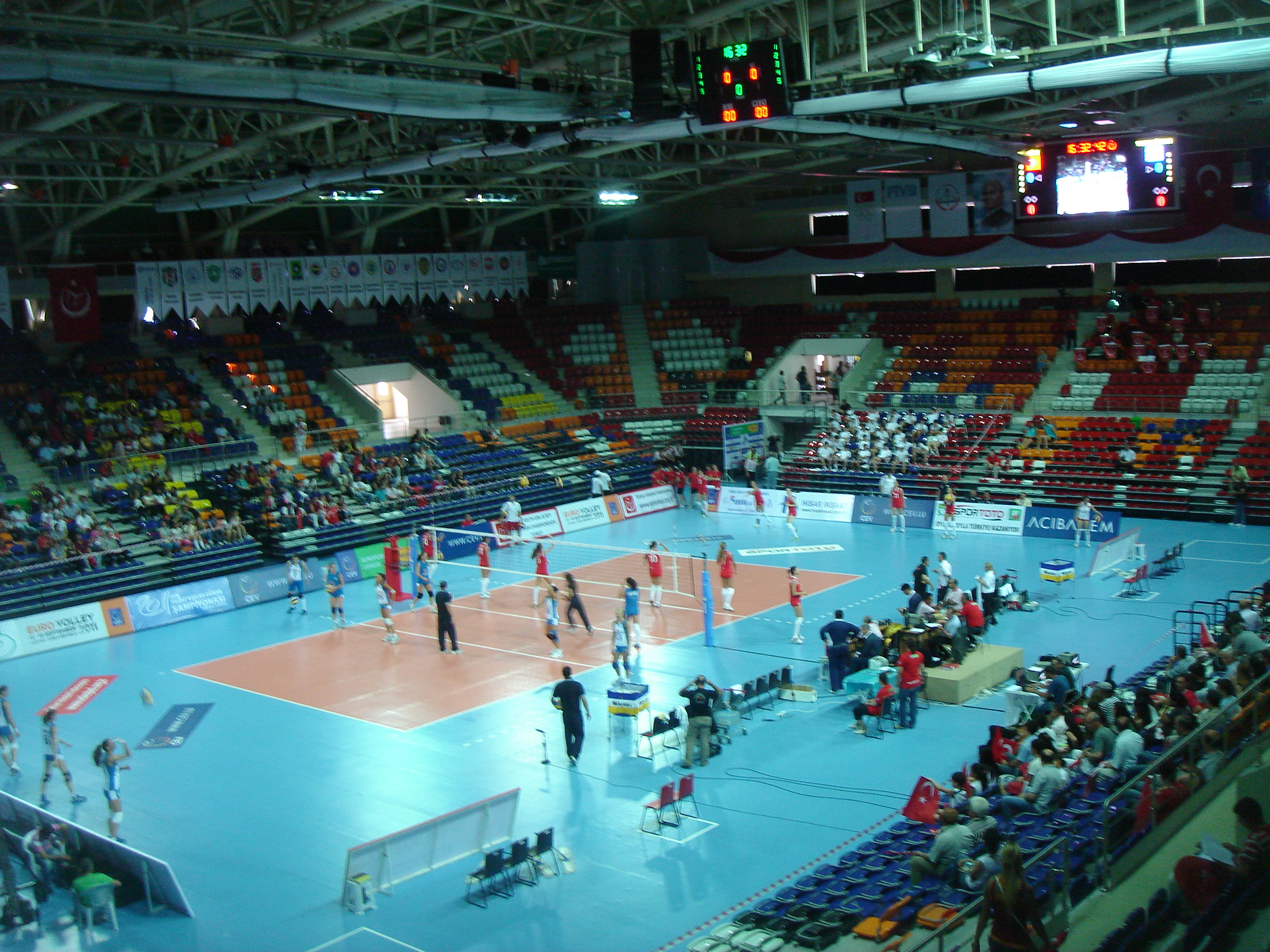
- Interactive map of Başkent Volleyball Hall
- Full name: Başkent Voleybol Salonu
- Location: Beşevler, Yenimahalle, Ankara, Turkey
- Coordinates: 39.93590°N 32.82054°E
- Owner: Turkish Volleyball Federation (TVF)
- Capacity: 7,600
- Surface: Wood flooring
- Scoreboard: yes
- Record attendance: 8,000 (Turkey-Poland, 6 May 2012)

Construction
- Groundbreaking: 8 April 2009
- Built: 2009–2010
- Opened: 6 February 2010

Tenants
- İller Bankası (TWVL); TED Ankara Kolejliler (TWVL); Zeren (TWVL)

Başkent Volleyball Hall, (Turkish: Başkent Voleybol Salonu) is an indoor volleyball venue within the TVF Sports Complex located at Beşevler neighborhood of Yenimahalle district in Ankara, Turkey. Opened in 2010, the venue has a seating capacity of 7,600 spectators.

== Construction ==
The sports complex was commissioned by the Turkish Volleyball Federation and its construction began on 8 April 2009 with groundbreaking. The hall was opened on 6 February 2010 and named after "capital city" (Turkish: Başkent).

In addition to the Başkent Volleyball Hall, there are one training hall with 850-seat capacity, named Beşevler Volleyball Hall, two indoor beach volleyball courts with underfloor heating, various service facilities for sports and administration as well as a hall of fame.

== Usage ==
As of July 2016 the facility has been exposed by Amnesty International as a government detention centre and torture facility for almost 10,000 soldiers involved in the failed coup d'état that was attempted by an as yet undisclosed secular anti-ISIS movement. where soldiers are being raped, beaten, and deprived of food and water with an as yet unknown death toll.

== International events hosted ==
2010

- 2010 Women's European Volleyball League Final Four – 24–25 July 2010

2011

- 2011 Men's European Volleyball Championship Qualification
- 2011 FIVB Girls Youth World Championship – 12–21 August 2011

2012

- 2012 Men's European Volleyball League-Final Four 30 June-1 July 2012
- 2012 Women's Junior European Volleyball Championship – 18–26 August 2012
- 2013 Men's European Volleyball Championship qualification Second round-Pool A-Tournament 2 matches – 14–16 September 2012

2013

- 2013 FIVB World Grand Prix-Pool C 2–4 August 2013
- 2013 FIVB Volleyball Men's U21 World Championship-Pool A, B and Final Round 22 August-1 September 2013

2014

- 2014 FIVB Volleyball Women's World Championship qualification (CEV)- Third round Pool 1 3–5 January 2014
- 2013–14 CEV Champions League-Final four 22–23 March 2014
- 2014 FIVB World Grand Prix-Pool A and E 1–3 August and 8–10 August 2014

2015

- 2015 FIVB Volleyball World Grand Prix – Pool C 3–5 July 2015
- 2015 Women's European Volleyball League – Leg 2 7–9 August 2015
- 2015 FIVB Volleyball Women's U23 World Championship 12–19 August 2015

2016

- Volleyball at the 2016 Summer Olympics – Women's European qualification 4–9 January
- 2016 FIVB Volleyball World Grand Prix – Pool G1 24–26 June

2017

- 2017 FIVB Volleyball World League – Pool C2 2–4 June
- 2017 FIVB Volleyball World Grand Prix – Pool A1 7–9 July

== See also ==
- List of indoor arenas in Turkey

Events and tenants
Preceded by Blinov SCC (Russia) Omsk	CEV Champions League; Final Venue; 2014	Succeeded by Max-Schmeling-Halle (Germany) Berlin
