= Ziraat Bankası S.K. =

Turkish volleyball club

Ziraat Bankası SK
- Full name: T.C. Ziraat Bankası Spor Kulübü
- Founded: 1981
- Ground: Başkent Volleyball Hall (Capacity: 7,600)
- Chairman: Alpaslan Çakar
- Manager: Mustafa Kavaz
- Captain: Arslan Ekşi
- League: Efeler Ligi
- 2025-26: Champions
- Website: Club home page

Uniforms
Home	Away

Ziraat Bankası SK (Turkish: T.C. Ziraat Bankası Spor Kulübü) is a Turkish professional volleyball club established in 1981 and based in Ankara, Turkey. It is sponsored by the state-owned Ziraat Bankası. Competing in the Turkish Men's Volleyball League, the top league in Turkey, its home venue is Başkent Volleyball Hall.

== Honours ==
=== Domestic competitions ===
- Turkish Volleyball League

Winners (4): 2020–21, 2021–22, 2022–23, 2024–25

- Turkish Volleyball Cup

Winners (1): 2009–10

- Turkish Volleyball Super Cup

Winners (4): 2010, 2021, 2022, 2023

=== European competitions ===
- CEV Cup

Winners (1): 2024–25
Silver (1): 2017–18

- CEV Challenge Cup

Silver (1): 2020–21

== Team roster ==
Team roster – season 2025/2026

No.	Name	Date of birth	Position
3	(Turkey) Hilmi Şahin	January 1, 2003 (age 23)	setter
6	(Turkey) Vahit Emre Savaş	March 7, 1995 (age 31)	middle blocker
7	(Turkey) Bedirhan Bülbül	July 29, 1999 (age 27)	middle blocker
8	(Netherlands) Dick Kooy	March 12, 1987 (age 39)	outside hitter
9	(Turkey) Özgür Karababa	January 28, 2003 (age 23)	middle blocker
10	(Finland) Joonas Jokela	December 12, 1998 (age 27)	opposite
11	(Turkey) Murat Yenipazar	September 23, 1993 (age 32)	setter
14	(Netherlands) Nimir Abdel-Aziz	February 5, 1992 (age 34)	opposite
17	(France) Trevor Clevenot	June 28, 1994 (age 32)	outside hitter
19	(Turkey) Berkay Bayraktar	January 1, 1998 (age 28)	libero
20	(Turkey) Aykut Gedik	August 5, 2003 (age 22)	outside hitter
21	(Poland) Tomasz Fornal	August 31, 1997 (age 28)	outside hitter
Head coach: Mustafa Kavaz; Assistant: Ersin Soysal
