= Arkas Spor =

Professional volleyball team based in İzmir, Turkey

- Full name: Arkas Spor
- Short name: Arkas
- Founded: 2001
- Ground: Karşıyaka Spor Salonu (Capacity: 5,000)
- Chairman: Lucien Arkas
- Manager: Glenn Hoag
- Captain: Bülent Kandemir
- League: Efeler Ligi
- 2022–23: 4th
- Website: Club home page

Arkas Spor is a professional volleyball team based in İzmir, Turkey. It plays in the Turkish Men's Volleyball League and in the CEV Champions League.

The Körfez Sports Club began competing in the 2nd volleyball league in the 1999-00 season. In 2001 it became the Saint Joseph Sports Club and in 2003 it was renamed Arkas Saint Joseph.

The club's name was changed to Arkas Sports Club at the Board of Directors meeting in May 2005. The club's primary sports branch is volleyball, but it is also active in sailing and bridge.

Arkas Sports Club is a young club that aims to increase the number of sports branches in which it participates every year.

== Mission ==
The club aims to contribute to the development of Turkish sports and to help nurture the next generation of healthy athletes who can serve as positive role models for society. Operating with this goal in mind, the club's goal is to build a strong base of players by discovering players in İzmir and in Turkey, train players so that they can play for Turkish National Teams at a high level and to drive interest in volleyball.

== Vision ==
To build a base of sportsmen and women that have adopted Arkas's philosophy and that can achieve victories in Turkish Leagues and in Europe and ultimately become champions. To contribute to the success of the Turkish National Teams.

== Staff ==
- President: Lucien Arkas
- Vice President: Bernard Arkas
- Member of the board: Cenk Değer
- Member of the board - Sports Coordinator: Yaşar Ergün
- Member of the board - Press Secretary: Uğur Özden
- Member of the board - International Relations Supervisor: Bahadır Osman
- Member of the board: Atıf İnönü

== Honours ==
=== International competitions ===
- CEV Champions League
  - Final Four (1): 2011–12
- CEV Challenge Cup
  - Champions (1): 2008–09

=== National competitions ===
- Turkish League
  - Champions (4): 2006, 2007, 2013, 2015
- Turkish Cup
  - Champions (2): 2009, 2011
