= Maliye Milli Piyango SK =

Maliye Milli Piyango Spor Kulübü is a Turkish sports club from Ankara active in basketball, handball, taekwondo and volleyball.

The club was founded in 1995. It's women's handball section won four national championships between 2007 and 2010. Having failed to reach the Champions League's group stage in its four appearances in the competition's qualification tournament, its major success in EHF competitions to date was reaching the 2012 EHF Cup's quarterfinals. The male team also plays in the national premier league.

== Titles ==
=== Women's handball ===
- Super League
  - 2007, 2008, 2009, 2010

=== Men's Volleyball ===
- CEV Challenge Cup
  - Third (1): 2017-18

== Squads ==
=== Women's handball ===
- 02 (Turkey) Nergiz Türkay
- 03 (Montenegro) Vinka Vlahović
- 05 (Turkey) Ceren Salur
- 07 (Turkey) Duygu Aydogan
- 08 (Turkey) Gülsüm Mercimek
- 09 (Turkey) Buket Keskin
- 10 (Turkey) Cigdem Özcan
- 11 (Turkey) Selma Akgül Pekmutlu
- 15 (Turkey) Sinem Eyövge Hosgör
- 22 (Croatia) Jelena Pirsl
- 25 (Ukraine) Yuliya Snopova
- 30 (Russia) Anastasia Sinitsyna
- 35 (Turkey) Derya Tinkaoglu
- 78 (Turkey) Neslihan Yakupoglu

== Notable former players ==
- (Turkey) Derya Tınkaoğlu (born 1988)
- (Russia) Tatiana Alizar
