= İstanbul Büyükşehir Belediyespor (men's volleyball) =

- Full name: İstanbul Büyükşehir Belediyesi Spor Kulübü
- Founded: 1991
- Ground: Cebeci Sports Complex (Capacity: 1850)
- Manager: (Turkey) Hakan Özkan
- League: Efeler Ligi
- 2025–26: 12th
- Website: Club home page
- Championships: 2 Balkan Cups; 1 Turkish Championship

İstanbul Büyükşehir Belediyespor, shortly İstanbul BBSK or İBBSK, are the men's volleyball department of İstanbul Büyükşehir Belediyespor, a multi-sport club based in Istanbul, Turkey. The team currently play in the Turkish Men's Volleyball League.

== Honours ==
=== European competitions ===
- CEV Challenge Cup
  - Semi-Finals (1): 2013–14
- BVA Cup
  - Winners (2): 2008, 2012

=== Domestic competitions ===
- Turkish Men's Volleyball League
  - Winners (1): 2008–09
