= Galatasaray men's volleyball team past rosters =

This article contains past rosters of the Galatasaray S.K. (men's volleyball) team.

== 1990 Era ==
=== 1991-92 ===
Roster

- (Czech Republic) Milan Džavoronok
- Coach: (Turkey) Enver Göçener

Milanov CSKA Sofía (Bulgaria)

=== 1992-93 ===
Roster

- (Russia) Alexander Serebrennikov

=== 1995-96 ===
Roster

- (Turkey) Nuri Şahin

=== 1996-97 ===
Roster

- (Turkey) Nuri Şahin

=== 1997-98 ===
Roster

- (Turkey) Nuri Şahin
- (Russia) Alexander Klimkin

=== 1998-99 ===
Roster

- (Turkey) Can Ayvazoğlu
- (Turkey) Nuri Şahin
- (Russia) Alexander Klimkin
- (Russia) Yevgeny Mitkov

=== 1999-00 ===
Roster

- (Turkey) Can Ayvazoğlu
- (Turkey) Hakan Fertelli
- (Turkey) Nuri Şahin
- (Turkey) Şevki Pehlivanoğlu
- (Russia) Alexander Klimkin
- (Poland) Dariusz Stanicki

== 2000 Era ==
=== 2000-01 ===
Roster

- (Turkey) Can Ayvazoğlu
- (Turkey) Hakan Fertelli
- (Turkey) Nuri Şahin
- (Turkey) Şevki Pehlivanoğlu
- (Russia) Alexander Klimkin
- (Poland) Dariusz Stanicki
- (Bulgaria) Konstantin Mitev

=== 2001-02 ===
Roster

- (Turkey) Can Ayvazoğlu
- (Turkey) Hakan Fertelli
- (Turkey) Nuri Şahin
- (Turkey) Şevki Pehlivanoğlu
- (Poland) Andrzej Szewinski

=== 2002-03 ===
Roster

- (Turkey) Can Ayvazoğlu
- (Turkey) Birkan Ülkütaşır
- (Turkey) Selçuk Keskin
- (Turkey) Şevki Pehlivanoğlu
- (Turkey) Onur Çapan
- Coach: (Turkey) Işık Menküer

=== 2003-04 ===
Roster

- (Turkey) Can Ayvazoğlu
- (Turkey) Fırat Özenç Tek
- (Turkey) Şevki Pehlivanoğlu
- (Turkey) Onur Çapan
- (Turkey) Ulaş Kıyak
- Coach: (Turkey) Işık Menküer

=== 2004-05 ===
Roster

- (Turkey) Caner Dengin
- (Turkey) Erkan Toğan
- (Turkey) Fırat Özenç Tek
- (Turkey) Levent Kaplan
- (Turkey) Onur Çapan
- (Turkey) Şevki Pehlivanoğlu
- (Turkey) Ulaş Kıyak
- Coach: (Turkey) Işık Menküer

=== 2005-06 ===
Roster

- (Turkey) Caner Dengin
- (Turkey) Fırat Özenç Tek
- (Turkey) Halil İbrahim Akşeker
- (Turkey) Kemal Kıvanç Elgaz
- (Turkey) Mustafa Oğuz Ramazanoğlu
- (Turkey) Murat Aslan
- (Turkey) Onur Çapan
- (Turkey) Şevki Pehlivanoğlu
- (Brazil) Diogo De Andrade Silva
- (Czech Republic) Jaromír Koláčný
- (Brazil) Renato Hermely
- Coach: (Turkey) Işık Menküer

=== 2006-07 ===
Roster

- (Turkey) Ahmet Pezük
- (Turkey) Caner Dengin
- (Turkey) Halil İbrahim Akşeker
- (Turkey) Kemal Kıvanç Elgaz
- (Turkey) Onur Çapan
- (Finland) Lasse-Petteri Laurila
- (United States) Pieter Olree
- (Serbia) Vladan Đorđević
- Coach: (Turkey) Işık Menküer

=== 2007-08 ===
Roster

- (Turkey) Ahmet Pezük
- (Turkey) Ali Çayır
- (Turkey) Can Ayvazoğlu
- (Turkey) Caner Dengin
- (Turkey) Caner Pekşen
- (Turkey) Çağlar Özel
- (Argentina) Gustavo Scholtis
- (Turkey) Halil İbrahim Akşeker
- (Croatia) Inoslav Krnić
- (Turkey) Kemal Kıvanç Elgaz
- (Montenegro) Milan Markovic
- (Turkey) Yasin Sancak
- Coach: (Turkey) Ali Ümit Hızal

=== 2008-09 ===
Roster

- (Turkey) Ahmet Pezük
- (Turkey) Ali Çayır
- (Turkey) Caner Dengin
- (Turkey) Caner Pekşen
- (Spain) Enrique de la Fuente
- (Turkey) Halil İbrahim Akşeker
- (Croatia) Inoslav Krnić
- (Turkey) İbrahim Emet
- (Turkey) Kemal Kıvanç Elgaz
- (Turkey) Senad Ok
- (Turkey) Sinan Cem Tanık
- (Turkey) Tarık Güray Şahin
- (Turkey) Turgay Doğan
- (Finland) Urpo Sivula
- Coach: (Turkey) Ali Ümit Hızal

=== 2009-10 ===
Roster

- (Turkey) Ahmet Pezük
- (Turkey) Ali Peçen
- (Brazil) Ashley Nemer
- (Turkey) Caner Pekşen
- (Germany) Frank Dehne
- (Turkey) Halil İbrahim Akşeker
- (Turkey) İbrahim Emet
- (Turkey) Kemal Kıvanç Elgaz
- (Turkey) Murathan Kısal
- (France) Philippe Barca-Cysique
- (Turkey) Semih Çıtak
- (Turkey) Senad Ok
- (Turkey) Tarık Güray Şahin
- (Turkey) Zeynel Korkmaz
- Coach: (Turkey) Işık Menküer

== 2010 Era ==
=== 2010-11 ===
Roster

- (Turkey) Ahmet Pezük
- (Turkey) Ali Peçen
- (Brazil) Ashlei Nemer
- (Turkey) Caner Pekşen
- (France) Yannick Bazin
- (Turkey) Volkan Güç
- (Turkey) Oğuzhan Tarakçı
- (Turkey) Kemal Kıvanç Elgaz
- (Turkey) Murathan Kısal
- (France) Philippe Barca-Cysique
- (Turkey) Yasin Sancak
- (Turkey) Senad Ok
- (Turkey) Tolga Altıntaş
- (Turkey) Caner Dengin
- Coach: (Turkey) Işık Menküer

=== 2011-12 ===
Roster

- (Turkey) Akif Gürgen
- (Turkey) Ahmet Pezük
- (Turkey) Caner Pekşen
- (Turkey) Caner Dengin
- (Turkey) Ferhat Akdeniz
- (Turkey) Erhan Dünge
- (Turkey) İsmail Cem Kurtar
- (Turkey) Kemal Kıvanç Elgaz
- (Turkey) Murat Kısal
- (Turkey) Serdar Semerci
- (Turkey) Tolga Altıntaş
- (Turkey) Ulaş Kıyak
- (Cuba) Henry Bell Cisnero
- (Venezuela) Kervin Piñerua
- (Cuba) Salvador Hidalgo Oliva
- Coach: (Turkey) Işık Menküer

=== 2012-13 ===
Roster

- (Turkey) Caner Dengin
- (Turkey) Caner Pekşen
- (Turkey) Erhan Dünge
- (Turkey) Ferhat Akdeniz
- (Turkey) Kemal Kıvanç Elgaz
- (Turkey) Murat Kısal
- (Turkey) Murat Aslan
- (Turkey) Tolgahan Camgöz
- (Turkey) Ulaş Kıyak
- (Serbia) Bojan Janić
- (Croatia) Tomislav Čošković
- (Bulgaria) Teodor Salparov
- (Bulgaria) Vladimir Nikolov
- Coach: (Serbia) Dragan Nešić

=== 2013-14 ===
Roster

- (Turkey) Berkay Özdemir
- (Turkey) Boğaçhan Zambak
- (Turkey) Cansın Hacıbekiroğlu
- (Turkey) Ferhat Akdeniz
- (Turkey) Fırat Ezel Filiz
- (Turkey) İbrahim Emet
- (Turkey) Muhammet Ertuğrul
- (Turkey) Mehmet Özbek
- (Turkey) Melih Sıratça
- (Turkey) Onurcan Çakır
- (Turkey) Oğuzhan Tarakçı
- (Turkey) Sinan Cem Tanık
- (Turkey) Yasin Aydın
- (Egypt) Ahmed Abdalla
- (Egypt) Ahmed Salah
- (Cuba) Henry Bell Cisnero
- Coach: (Turkey) Ahmet Reşat Arığ

=== 2014-15 ===
Roster

- (Turkey) Boğaçhan Zambak
- (Turkey) Doğukan Ulu
- (Turkey) Halil İbrahim Akşeker
- (Turkey) Hakan Polat
- (Turkey) İbrahim Emet
- (Czech Republic) Kamil Baránek
- (Turkey) Mehmet Özbek
- (Turkey) Melih Sıratça
- (Turkey) Onurcan Çakır
- (Turkey) Safa Urlu
- (Turkey) Selçuk Keskin
- (Turkey) Yasin Aydın
- (France) Samuel Tuia
- (Czech Republic) Filip Rejlek
- Coach: (Italy) Flavio Gulinelli

=== 2015-16 ===
Roster

- (Turkey) Boğaçhan Zambak
- (Turkey) Can Ayvazoğlu
- (Turkey) Doğukan Ulu
- (Turkey) Emin Gök
- (Turkey) Halil İbrahim Akşeker
- (Turkey) İbrahim Emet
- (Turkey) Melih Sıratça
- (Turkey) Onurcan Çakır
- (Turkey) Yasin Aydın
- (Bosnia and Herzegovina) (Turkey) Adis Lagumdzija
- (Finland) Eemi Tervaportti
- (Russia) (Australia) Igor Yudin
- (Colombia) Liberman Agamez
- (Serbia) Milan Katić
- Coach: (Turkey) Nedim Özbey

=== 2016-17 ===
Roster

- (Turkey) Berkay Özdemir
- (Turkey) Can Ayvazoğlu
- (Turkey) Doğukan Ulu
- (Turkey) Emin Gök
- (Turkey) Emre Unlu
- (Turkey) Halil İbrahim Akşeker
- (Turkey) Halil İbrahim Yücel
- (Turkey) Hüseyin Koç
- (Turkey) Melih Sıratça
- (Turkey) Murathan Kısal
- (Turkey) Yasin Aydın
- (Bosnia and Herzegovina) (Turkey) Adis Lagumdzija
- (France) Samuel Tuia
- (Poland) Zbigniew Bartman
- Coach: (Turkey) Nedim Özbey

=== 2017-18 ===
Roster

- (Turkey) Boğaçhan Zambak
- (Turkey) Can Ayvazoğlu
- (Turkey) Doğukan Ulu
- (Turkey) Emin Gök
- (Turkey) Ertuğrul Gazi Metin
- (Turkey) Hüseyin Koç
- (Turkey) Melih Sıratça
- (Turkey) Onurcan Çakır
- (Turkey) Özgür Türkmen
- (Turkey) Ufuk Minici
- (Turkey) Yasin Aydın
- (Belarus) Aleh Akhrem
- (Uganda) Daudi Okello
- (Bulgaria) Teodor Todorow
- Coach: (Turkey) Nedim Özbey

=== 2018-19 ===
Roster

- (Turkey) Can Ayvazoğlu
- (Turkey) Doğukan Ulu
- (Turkey) Emin Gök
- (Turkey) Ertuğrul Gazi Metin
- (Turkey) Muzaffer Yönet
- (Turkey) Melih Sıratça
- (Turkey) Onurcan Çakır
- (Turkey) Özgür Türkmen
- (Turkey) Selçuk Keskin
- (Turkey) Ufuk Minici
- (Turkey) Yasin Aydın
- (Canada) Justin Duff
- (Russia) (Italy) Oleg Antonov
- (Estonia) Oliver Venno
- (Hungary) Roland Gergye
- Coach: (Turkey) Nedim Özbey

=== 2019-20 ===
Roster

- (Turkey) Burak Mert
- (Turkey) Burutay Subaşı
- (Turkey) Doğukan Ulu
- (Turkey) Ertuğrul Gazi Metin
- (Turkey) Muzaffer Yönet
- (Turkey) Melih Sıratça
- (Turkey) Onurcan Çakır
- (Turkey) Selçuk Keskin
- (Turkey) Selim Kalaycı
- (Turkey) Vahit Emre Savaş
- (Turkey) Yasin Aydın
- (Russia) (Italy) Oleg Antonov
- (Estonia) Oliver Venno
- (Canada) Lucas Van Berkel
- Coach: (Turkey) Nedim Özbey

== 2020 Era ==
=== 2020-21 ===
Roster

- (Turkey) Batuhan Avcı
- (Turkey) Burutay Subaşı
- (Turkey) Burak Mert
- (Turkey) Doğukan Ulu
- (Turkey) Ertuğrul Gazi Metin
- (Turkey) Melih Sıratça
- (Turkey) Murat Yenipazar
- (Turkey) Onurcan Çakır
- (Turkey) Selçuk Keskin
- (Turkey) Sadık Efe Özbey
- (Turkey) Selim Kalaycı
- (Turkey) Vahit Emre Savaş
- (Turkey) Yasin Aydın
- (Puerto Rico) Maurice Torres
- Coach: (Turkey) Nedim Özbey

=== 2021-22 ===
Roster

- (Turkey) Burutay Subaşı
- (Turkey) Beytullah Hatipoğlu
- (Turkey) Cansın Hacıbekiroğlu
- (Turkey) Doğukan Ulu
- (Turkey) Hakkı Çapkınoğlu
- (Turkey) Melih Sıratça
- (Turkey) Murat Yenipazar
- (Turkey) Muzaffer Yönet
- (Turkey) Onur Günaydı
- (Turkey) Onur Çukur
- (Turkey) Onurcan Çakır
- (Turkey) Selim Kalaycı
- (Turkey) Vahit Emre Savaş
- (Turkey) Yasin Aydın
- (Croatia) Marko Sedlaček
- (Puerto Rico) Maurice Torres
- (Slovakia) (Russia) Lukash Divish
- Coach: (Turkey) Nedim Özbey
