= 2021–22 Galatasaray S.K. (men's volleyball) season =

Galatasaray HDI Sigorta
2021–22 season
- President: Burak Elmas
- Head coach: Nedim Özbey
- Arena: TVF Burhan Felek Sport Hall
- AXA Sigorta Efeler Ligi: 6th
- Playoffs: 5th
- AXA Sigorta Kupa Voley: Runners-up
- CEV Cup: 8th Finals

It is the 2021–22 season of the Men's Volleyball team of Galatasaray Sports Club.

== Sponsorship and kit manufacturers ==
- Supplier: Galatasaray Store
- Name sponsor: HDI Sigorta
- Main sponsor: HDI Sigorta
- Back sponsor: —
- Sleeve sponsor: —
- Lateral sponsor: —
- Short sponsor: A11 Hotels
- Socks sponsor: —

== Technical Staff ==
As of 9 March 2022

Name	Job
(Turkey) Neslihan Turan	Volleyball Branch Administrative Manager
(Turkey) Nedim Özbey	Men's Volleyball Team Head Coach
(Turkey) Hüseyin Koç	Men's Volleyball Team Manager
(Turkey) Serpil Amaç	Volleyball Branch Secretary
(Turkey) Umut Çakır	Men's Volleyball Team Coach
(Turkey) Hüseyin Gültekin	Men's Volleyball Team Coach
(Turkey) Yunus Ünver	Men's Volleyball Team Conditioning Coach
(Turkey) Aykut Yılmaz	Men's Volleyball Team Masseur
(Turkey) Mertcan Kır	Men's Volleyball Team Statistics Coach
(Turkey) Azad Aslan	Physiotherapist

== Team roster ==
As of 9 March 2022

Shirt No	Nationality	Player	Birth Date	Position
1	Turkey	Yasin Aydın	11 July 1995 (age 30)	Outside Hitter
2	Turkey	Muzaffer Yönet	18 June 1997 (age 28)	Setter
3	Turkey	Melih Sıratça	18 February 1996 (age 30)	Outside Hitter
5	Turkey	Beytullah Hatipoğlu	24 February 1992 (age 34)	Libero
7	Turkey	Vahit Emre Savaş	7 March 1995 (age 31)	Middle Blocker
9	Turkey	Hakkı Çapkınoğlu	20 July 1990 (age 35)	Middle Blocker
10	Turkey	Murat Yenipazar	1 January 1993 (age 33)	Setter
11	Puerto Rico	Maurice Torres (c)	6 July 1991 (age 34)	Opposite
12	Russia	Lukash Divish	20 February 1986 (age 40)	Opposite
13	Turkey	Cansın Hacıbekiroğlu	12 July 1987 (age 38)	Middle Blocker
14	Turkey	Selim Kalaycı	12 February 2000 (age 26)	Opposite
15	Croatia	Marko Sedlaček	29 July 1996 (age 29)	Opposite
16	Turkey	Onur Günaydı	28 September 2002 (age 23)	Opposite
17	Turkey	Doğukan Ulu	30 October 1995 (age 30)	Middle Blocker
18	Turkey	Onurcan Çakır	27 September 1995 (age 30)	Libero

== Transfers ==
=== New contracts ===
Date	Player	Source
26 April 2021	(Turkey) Burutay Subaşı	

=== In ===
Date	Player	From	Source
26 April 2021	(Turkey) Hakkı Çapkınoğlu	(Turkey) Halkbank	
12 May 2021	(Croatia) Marko Sedlaček	(Italy) Vero Volley Monza	
25 May 2021	(Turkey) Beytullah Hatipoğlu	(Turkey) İstanbul Büyükşehir Belediyespor	
28 May 2021	(Turkey) Cansın Hacıbekiroğlu	(Turkey) Tokat Belediye Plevnespor	
13 August 2021	(Turkey) Onur Çukur	(United States) Grand Canyon University	
27 November 2021	(Slovakia) (Russia) Lukash Divish	(Turkey) Allpower Akü Cizre Belediyespor	

=== Out ===
Date	Player	From	Source
19 April 2021	(Turkey) Ertuğrul Gazi Metin	(Turkey) Altekma Spor Kulübü	
26 April 2021	(Turkey) Selçuk Keskin	(Turkey) Halkbank	
30 April 2021	(Turkey) Batuhan Avcı	(Turkey) Arkas Spor	
1 June 2021	(Turkey) Burak Mert	(Turkey) Fenerbahçe HDI Sigorta	
20 July 2021	(Russia) Yury Berezhko	(Russia) Zenit-Kazan	
25 January 2022	(Turkey) Burutay Subaşı	(Turkey) Arkas Spor	

== Pre-season and friendlies ==
Date	Time		Score		Set 1	Set 2	Set 3	Set 4	Set 5	Total	Report
25 September 2021	–	Gwardia Wrocław (Poland)	3–1	(Turkey) Galatasaray HDI Sigorta	21–25	25–19	25–23	26–24	–	97–91	Report
26 September 2021	–	Jastrzębski Węgiel (Poland)	3–0	(Turkey) Galatasaray HDI Sigorta	25–20	25–16	25–22	–	–	75–58	Report
27 September 2021	–	Skra Bełchatów (Poland)	1–3	(Turkey) Galatasaray HDI Sigorta	30–28	23–25	23–25	22–25	–	98–103	Report

== Competitions ==
=== Turkish Men's Volleyball League (AXA Sigorta Efeler Ligi) ===
==== League table ====
Qualified for the Play-offs (1–4)
Qualified for the Play-offs (5–8)
Qualified for the Play-outs

Pos	Team	Pld	W	L	Pts	SW	SL	SR	SPW	SPL	SPR	Qualification
1	Halkbank	26	24	2	68	74	23	3.217	2304	1974	1.167	Play-offs (1-4)
2	Fenerbahçe HDI Sigorta	26	21	5	63	66	23	2.870	2172	1849	1.175	Play-offs (1-4)
3	Ziraat Bankası	26	21	5	61	66	31	2.129	2286	2061	1.109	Play-offs (1-4)
4	Arkas Spor	26	18	8	53	64	37	1.730	2335	2160	1.081	Play-offs (1-4)
5	Spor Toto	26	17	9	47	56	40	1.400	2207	2048	1.078	Play-offs (5-8)
6	Galatasaray HDI Sigorta	26	16	10	48	56	45	1.244	2292	2204	1.040	Play-offs (5-8)
7	Bursa Büyükşehir Belediyesi	26	10	16	34	47	52	0.904	2159	2213	0.976	Play-offs (5-8)
8	Allpower Akü Cizre Belediyespor	26	10	16	28	39	60	0.650	2086	2266	0.921	Play-offs (5-8)
9	Altekma Spor Kulübü	26	9	17	29	42	59	0.712	2163	2313	0.935	
10	Tokat Belediye Plevnespor	26	9	17	28	39	61	0.639	2142	2284	0.938	
11	Yeni Kızıltepespor	26	8	18	26	38	58	0.655	2085	2202	0.947	
12	Sorgun Belediyespor	26	8	18	24	41	64	0.641	2258	2419	0.933	
13	Solhanspor	26	7	19	23	36	67	0.537	2148	2342	0.917	Play-outs
14	Avşar Maden Suyu Afyon Belediye Yüntaş Voleybol	26	4	22	14	27	71	0.380	2043	2345	0.871	Play-outs

Source: AXA Sigorta Efeler Lig Etabı / Update: 4 April 2022

==== Regular season (1st Half) ====
- All times are Europe Time (UTC+03:00).

Date	Time		Score		Set 1	Set 2	Set 3	Set 4	Set 5	Total	Report
10 October 2021	17:00	Galatasaray HDI Sigorta	3–0	Ziraat Bankası	25–20	25–23	25–21	–	–	75–64	Report
13 October 2021	14:00	Bursa Büyükşehir Belediyesi	3–0	Galatasaray HDI Sigorta	25–23	25–19	25–22	–	–	75–64	Report
18 October 2021	14:00	Galatasaray HDI Sigorta	3–1	Yeni Kızıltepespor	18–25	25–13	30–28	25–18	–	98–84	Report
24 October 2021	16:00	Sorgun Belediyespor	1–3	Galatasaray HDI Sigorta	25–14	17–25	23–25	20–25	–	85–89	Report
28 October 2021	17:00	Galatasaray HDI Sigorta	3–2	Arkas Spor	26–28	23–25	25–19	25–18	15–11	114–101	Report
31 October 2021	15:00	Fenerbahçe HDI Sigorta	1–3	Galatasaray HDI Sigorta	25–17	22–25	21–25	21–25	–	89–92	Report
8 November 2021	15:30	Galatasaray HDI Sigorta	0–3	Halkbank	19–25	15–25	17–25	–	–	51–75	Report
14 November 2021	13:00	Allpower Akü Cizre Belediyespor	1–3	Galatasaray HDI Sigorta	25–23	14–25	19–25	23–25	–	81–98	Report
21 November 2021	14:00	Galatasaray HDI Sigorta	3–1	Avşar Maden Suyu Afyon Belediye Yüntaş Voleybol	25–17	25–19	23–25	25–19	–	98–80	Report
27 November 2021	15:30	Tokat Belediye Plevnespor	3–2	Galatasaray HDI Sigorta	25–27	21–25	25–23	30–28	18–16	119–119	Report
4 December 2021	14:30	Galatasaray HDI Sigorta	3–0	Solhanspor	25–18	25–16	25–20	–	–	75–54	Report
12 December 2021	15:00	Altekma Spor Kulübü	3–0	Galatasaray HDI Sigorta	25–19	25–20	25–17	–	–	75–56	Report
19 December 2021	15:30	Spor Toto	3–2	Galatasaray HDI Sigorta	24–26	25–16	24–26	25–14	15–13	113–95	Report

==== Regular season (2nd Half) ====
- All times are Europe Time (UTC+03:00).

Date	Time		Score		Set 1	Set 2	Set 3	Set 4	Set 5	Total	Report
8 January 2022	15:00	Ziraat Bankası	3–1	Galatasaray HDI Sigorta	25–23	23–25	25–13	25–20	–	98–81	Report
16 January 2022	17:00	Galatasaray HDI Sigorta	0–3	Bursa Büyükşehir Belediyesi	18–25	21–25	18–25	–	–	57–75	Report
24 January 2022	15:00	Yeni Kızıltepespor	1–3	Galatasaray HDI Sigorta	21–25	18–25	25–23	18–25	–	82–98	Report
29 January 2022	14:00	Galatasaray HDI Sigorta	3–0	Sorgun Belediyespor	25–23	25–20	25–21	–	–	75–64	Report
5 February 2022	16:00	Arkas Spor	3–2	Galatasaray HDI Sigorta	19–25	27–25	25–20	19–25	15–11	105–106	Report
12 February 2022	14:00	Galatasaray HDI Sigorta	1–3	Fenerbahçe HDI Sigorta	18–25	28–30	25–20	22–25	–	93–100	Report
19 February 2022	18:30	Halkbank	3–0	Galatasaray HDI Sigorta	25–19	25–20	25–22	–	–	75–61	Report
26 February 2022	15:00	Galatasaray HDI Sigorta	3–1	Allpower Akü Cizre Belediyespor	25–20	23–25	25–22	25–17	–	98–84	Report
6 March 2022	16:00	Avşar Maden Suyu Afyon Belediye Yüntaş Voleybol	1–3	Galatasaray HDI Sigorta	22–25	26–24	20–25	19–25	–	87–99	Report
14 March 2022	14:00	Galatasaray HDI Sigorta	3–0	Tokat Belediye Plevnespor	25–20	25–17	25–20	–	–	75–57	Report
19 March 2022	16:00	Solhanspor	2–3	Galatasaray HDI Sigorta	25–21	15–25	19–25	28–26	12–15	99–112	Report
26 March 2022	16:00	Galatasaray HDI Sigorta	3–2	Altekma Spor Kulübü	23–25	25–14	25–17	23–25	15–11	111–92	Report
1 April 2022	16:00	Galatasaray HDI Sigorta	3–1	Spor Toto	25–20	27–29	25–21	25–21	–	102–91	Report

==== Playoffs ====
===== 5–8th place =====
- All times are Europe Time (UTC+03:00).

Date	Time		Score		Set 1	Set 2	Set 3	Set 4	Set 5	Total	Report
16 April 2022	17:00	Galatasaray HDI Sigorta	3–2	Bursa Büyükşehir Belediyesi	19–25	20–25	26–24	25–21	15–13	105–108	Report
19 April 2022	20:30	Bursa Büyükşehir Belediyesi	3–2	Galatasaray HDI Sigorta	22–25	25–22	27–25	21–25	16–14	111–111	Report
23 April 2022	15:00	Galatasaray HDI Sigorta	3–0	Bursa Büyükşehir Belediyesi	25–21	25–19	25–21	–	–	75–61	Report

===== 5–6th place =====
- All times are Europe Time (UTC+03:00).

Date	Time		Score		Set 1	Set 2	Set 3	Set 4	Set 5	Total	Report
26 April 2022	15:00	Galatasaray HDI Sigorta	3–0	Allpower Akü Cizre Belediyespor	25–18	25–15	25–18	–	–	75–51	Report
29 April 2022	14:00	Allpower Akü Cizre Belediyespor	2–3	Galatasaray HDI Sigorta	28–26	14–25	23–25	25–20	16–18	106–114	Report

=== Turkish Men's Volleyball Cup (AXA Sigorta Kupa Voley) ===
==== Group A ====
Pos	Team	Pld	W	L	Pts	SW	SL	SR	SPW	SPL	SPR
1	Galatasaray HDI Sigorta	3	2	1	7	8	4	2.000	284	266	1.068
2	Allpower Akü Cizre Belediyespor	3	2	1	6	8	5	1.600	286	270	1.059
3	Bursa Büyükşehir Belediyesi	3	2	1	5	7	5	1.400	277	260	1.065
4	Solhanspor	3	0	3	0	0	9	0.000	178	229	0.777

===== Results =====
- All times are Europe Time (UTC+03:00).

Date	Time		Score		Set 1	Set 2	Set 3	Set 4	Set 5	Total	Report
1 October 2021	16:00	Galatasaray HDI Sigorta	2–3	Allpower Akü Cizre Belediyespor	22–25	25–17	24–26	25–21	12–15	108–104	Report
2 October 2021	20:00	Solhanspor	0–3	Galatasaray HDI Sigorta	27–29	21–25	22–25	–	–	70–79	Report
3 October 2021	15:30	Galatasaray HDI Sigorta	3–1	Bursa Büyükşehir Belediyesi	25–23	25–20	21–25	26–24	–	97–92	Report

==== Quarter-finals ====
- All times are Europe Time (UTC+03:00).

Date	Time		Score		Set 1	Set 2	Set 3	Set 4	Set 5	Total	Report
22 December 2021	17:00	Galatasaray HDI Sigorta	3–2	Allpower Akü Cizre Belediyespor	23–25	23–25	25–21	25–11	15–9	111–91	Report

==== Semi-finals ====
- All times are Europe Time (UTC+03:00).

Date	Time		Score		Set 1	Set 2	Set 3	Set 4	Set 5	Total	Report
11 April 2022	17:30	Galatasaray HDI Sigorta	3–2	Spor Toto	28–30	25–23	25–20	11–25	15–10	104–108	Report

==== Finals ====
- All times are Europe Time (UTC+03:00).

Date	Time		Score		Set 1	Set 2	Set 3	Set 4	Set 5	Total	Report
13 April 2022	15:00	Arkas Spor	3–2	Galatasaray HDI Sigorta	25–23	22–25	25–17	27–29	15–8	114–102	Report

=== CEV Cup ===
==== 16th Finals ====
Date	Time		Score		Set 1	Set 2	Set 3	Set 4	Set 5	Total	Report
7 December 2021	21:00	SWD Powervolleys Düren (Germany)	2–3	(Turkey) Galatasaray HDI İstanbul	19–25	26–24	25–23	23–25	14–16	107–113	Report
8 December 2021	21:00	Galatasaray HDI İstanbul (Turkey)	3–0	(Germany) SWD Powervolleys Düren	25–17	25–19	25–23			75–59	Report

==== 8th Finals ====
Date	Time		Score		Set 1	Set 2	Set 3	Set 4	Set 5	Total	Report
12 January 2022	18:00	ČEZ Karlovarsko (Czech Republic)	3–0	(Turkey) Galatasaray HDI İstanbul	25–23	25–18	25–16			75–57	Report
20 January 2022	19:00	Galatasaray HDI İstanbul (Turkey)	1–3	(Czech Republic) ČEZ Karlovarsko	25–17	17–25	18–25	22–25		82–92	Report
