= 2022–23 Galatasaray S.K. (men's volleyball) season =

Galatasaray HDI Sigorta
2022–23 season
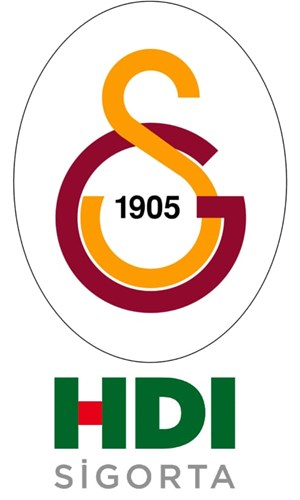
- President: Dursun Özbek
- Head coach: Umut Çakır
- Arena: TVF Burhan Felek Sport Hall
- AXA Sigorta Efeler Ligi: 6th seed
- Playoffs: 5th
- AXA Sigorta Kupa Voley: Quarter-finals
- CEV Cup: Playoffs

It is the 2022–23 season of the Men's Volleyball team of Galatasaray Sports Club.

== Overview ==
=== June ===
- On 21 June 2022, Galatasaray Men's Volleyball team manager Hüseyin Koç said goodbye to Galatasaray with a post he shared on his social media account.
- On 24 June 2022, the roads were separated by mutual agreement with Nedim Özbey, Head Coach of Galatasaray Men's Volleyball Team.
- On 25 June 2022, Umut Çakır, who has been working as an assistant coach at Galatasaray since 2015, has been appointed as the head coach of the Galatasaray Men's Volleyball Team.

=== August ===
- On 5 August 2022, Mehmetcan Şamlı was appointed as the Men's Volleyball Team Manager.
- Osman Çakıray was appointed as the assistant coach of the Men's Volleyball Team on 9 August 2022.
- On 10 August 2022, Yalçın Ayhan became the physiotherapist of the Men's Volleyball Team.
- The fixtures of the AXA Sigorta Efeler League for the 2022–23 volleyball season were determined with the drawing of lots held at the Ankara Headquarters of the Turkish Volleyball Federation on August 12, 2022.

=== October ===
- At the commemoration ceremony for Metin Görgün, the former national volleyball player who lost his life on 31 October 2022, Akif Üstündağ, the president of the Turkish Volleyball Federation; Announced that the name of AXA Sigorta Efeler League will be AXA Sigorta Efeler League 2022–23 Metin Görgün Season in the 2022–23 season.

== Sponsorship and kit manufacturers ==
- Supplier: Umbro
- Name sponsor: HDI Sigorta
- Main sponsor: HDI Sigorta
- Back sponsor: Tunç Holding
- Sleeve sponsor: —
- Lateral sponsor: —
- Short sponsor: —
- Socks sponsor: —

== Technical Staff ==
As of 13 August 2022

Name	Job
(Turkey) Neslihan Turan	Volleyball Teams Administrative Manager
(Turkey) Mehmetcan Şamlı	Team Manager
(Turkey) Umut Çakır	Head Coach
(Turkey) Hüseyin Gültekin	Assistant Coach
(Turkey) Osman Çakıray	Assistant Coach
(Turkey) Yunus Ünver	Assistant Coach and Conditioning Coach
(Turkey) Yalçın Ayhan	Physiotherapist
(Turkey) Mertcan Kır	Statistics Coach
(Turkey) Aykut Yılmaz	Masseur
(Turkey) Serpil Amaç	Volleyball Branch Secretary

== Team roster ==
As of 11 March 2023

Shirt No	Nationality	Player	Birth Date	Position
1	Turkey	Selçuk Keskin (c)	15 January 1982 (age 44)	Setter
3	Turkey	Melih Sıratça	18 February 1996 (age 30)	Outside Hitter
4	Turkey	Baturalp Burak Güngör	28 July 1993 (age 32)	Outside Hitter
5	Turkey	Beytullah Hatipoğlu	24 February 1992 (age 34)	Libero
6	Australia	Thomas Edgar	21 June 1989 (age 36)	Opposite
7	Turkey	Orçun Ergün	24 May 1992 (age 33)	Setter
8	Turkey	Onurcan Çakır	27 September 1995 (age 30)	Libero
9	Turkey	Hakkı Çapkınoğlu	20 July 1990 (age 35)	Middle-blocker
10	Turkey	Aykut Acar	14 February 2000 (age 26)	Middle-blocker
11	Turkey	Hakan Uygunoğlu	8 January 2002 (age 24)	Setter
12	Iran	Morteza Sharifi	27 May 1999 (age 26)	Outside Hitter
13	Turkey	Oğuzhan Karasu	16 June 1995 (age 30)	Middle-blocker
14	Turkey	Selim Kalaycı	12 February 2000 (age 26)	Opposite
15	Turkey	Emir Kaan Öztürk	20 December 2000 (age 25)	Middle-blocker
16	Turkey	Onur Günaydı	28 September 2002 (age 23)	Outside Hitter
19	Turkey	Yasin Aydın	11 July 1995 (age 30)	Outside Hitter
29	Turkey	Fatih Eren Uğur	1 January 1990 (age 36)	Middle-blocker

== Transfers ==
=== New contracts ===
Date	Player	Contract length	Source
22 July 2022	(Turkey) Yasin Aydın	1-year + 1-year	
22 July 2022	(Turkey) Melih Sıratça	1-year + 1-year	
8 August 2022	(Turkey) Selim Kalaycı	1-year	
11 August 2022	(Turkey) Onur Günaydı	2-year	

=== In ===
Date	Player	From	Source
22 July 2022	(Turkey) Aykut Acar	(Turkey) Bigadiç Belediyespor	
23 July 2022	(Turkey) Selçuk Keskin	(Turkey) Halkbank	
25 July 2022	(Turkey) Oğuzhan Karasu	(Turkey) Halkbank	
2 August 2022	(Turkey) Orçun Ergün	(Turkey) Sorgun Belediyespor	
12 August 2022	(Australia) Thomas Edgar	(Japan) JT Thunders	
26 August 2022	(Turkey) Emir Kaan Öztürk	(Turkey) İstanbul Büyükşehir Belediyespor	
26 August 2022	(Turkey) Hakan Uygunoğlu	(Turkey) Bigadiç Belediyespor	
4 October 2022	(Turkey) Baturalp Burak Güngör	(Turkey) Spor Toto	
11 March 2023	(Turkey) Fatih Eren Uğur	(Turkey) Hatay Büyükşehir Belediye	

=== Out ===
Date	Player	From	Source
27 May 2022	(Turkey) Murat Yenipazar	(Ukraine) VC Barkom-Kazhany	
28 May 2022	(Turkey) Cansın Hacıbekiroğlu	(Turkey) Hekimoğlu Global Connect Travel Bursa	
30 May 2022	(Turkey) Muzaffer Yönet	(Turkey) Altekma Spor Kulübü	
1 June 2022	(Puerto Rico) Maurice Torres	Free agent	
1 June 2022	(Russia) Lukash Divish	(Turkey) Altekma Spor Kulübü	
2 June 2022	(Turkey) Doğukan Ulu	(Turkey) Halkbank	
22 June 2022	(Turkey) Vahit Emre Savaş	(Turkey) Fenerbahçe HDI Sigorta	
8 July 2022	(Croatia) Marko Sedlaček	(Italy) Top Volley Cisterna	

== Pre-season and friendlies ==
Date	Time		Score		Set 1	Set 2	Set 3	Set 4	Set 5	Total	Report
6 September 2022	–	Galatasaray HDI Sigorta	2–1	Cizre Belediyespor	29–27	26–28	25–18	–	–	80–73	Report
15 September 2022	16:30	Altekma Spor Kulübü	2–3	Galatasaray HDI Sigorta	18–25	25–16	25–20	23–25	9–15	100–101	Report
16 September 2022	14:00	Arkas Spor	3–1	Galatasaray HDI Sigorta	25–22	25–22	20–25	25–21	–	95–90	Report
17 September 2022	14:00	Galatasaray HDI Sigorta	3–2	Dinamo București	25–17	18–25	25–23	19–25	19–17	106–107	Report
4 January 2023	–	Galatasaray HDI Sigorta	3–0	Arkas Spor	25–19	25–19	31–29	–	–	81–67	Report

== Competitions ==
=== Turkish Men's Volleyball League (AXA Sigorta Efeler Ligi) ===
==== League table ====
Qualified for the Play-off (1st-4th)
Qualified for the Play-off (5th-8th)
Qualified for the Turkish Men's Volleyball First League

Pos	Team	Pld	W	L	Pts	SW	SL	SR	SPW	SPL	SPR	Qualification
1	Halkbank	25	24	1	69	73	15	4.867	2157	1755	1.229	Play-off (1st-4th)
2	Ziraat Bankası	25	22	3	63	67	22	3.045	2135	1846	1.157	Play-off (1st-4th)
3	Fenerbahçe HDI Sigorta	25	17	8	50	60	37	1.622	2227	2069	1.076	Play-off (1st-4th)
4	Arkas Spor	25	16	9	48	55	36	1.528	2149	1985	1.083	Play-off (1st-4th)
5	Bursa Büyükşehir Belediyesi	25	15	10	46	53	37	1.432	2079	1984	1.048	Play-off (5th-8th)
6	Galatasaray HDI Sigorta	25	15	10	46	58	42	1.381	2293	2233	1.027	Play-off (5th-8th)
7	TÜRŞAD	25	13	12	36	47	49	0.959	2124	2178	0.975	Play-off (5th-8th)
8	Cizre Belediyespor	25	12	13	38	47	49	0.959	2117	2124	0.997	Play-off (5th-8th)
9	Spor Toto	25	10	15	30	40	53	0.755	2042	2118	0.964	
10	Hekimoğlu Global Connect Travel Bvi	25	8	17	22	33	60	0.550	1984	2167	0.916	
11	Develi Belediye	25	6	19	24	35	57	0.614	1960	2087	0.939	
12	Altekma Spor Kulübü	25	5	20	17	22	63	0.349	1772	2025	0.875	Turkish Men's Volleyball First League
13	Hatay Büyükşehir Belediye (Note: Hatay Büyükşehir Belediye withdrew from the league, following the 2023 Turkey–Syria earthquake, and was not relegated at the end of the season.)	13	5	8	16	22	28	0.786	1094	1145	0.955	
14	Tokat Belediye Plevnespor	25	1	24	2	10	74	0.135	1651	2068	0.798	Turkish Men's Volleyball First League

Source: AXA Sigorta Efeler League Metin Görgün Season League Stage
Rules for classification: 1) Games won 2) Points 3) Set ratio 4) Setpoint ratio

==== Regular season (1st Half) ====
- All times are Europe Time (UTC+03:00).

Date	Time		Score		Set 1	Set 2	Set 3	Set 4	Set 5	Total	Report
1 October 2022	15:30	Tokat Belediye Plevnespor	0–3	Galatasaray HDI Sigorta	23–25	20–25	27–29	–	–	70–79	Report 1 Report 2
5 October 2022	17:00	Galatasaray HDI Sigorta	3–1	Hekimoğlu Global Connect Travel Bvi	25–21	29–27	20–25	25–15	–	99–88	Report 1 Report 2
8 October 2022	14:00	Hatay Büyükşehir Belediye	2–3	Galatasaray HDI Sigorta	20–25	26–24	25–23	17–25	13–15	101–112	Report 1 Report 2
15 October 2022	14:30	Galatasaray HDI Sigorta	2–3	Halkbank	27–25	20–25	21–25	25–23	12–15	105–113	Report 1 Report 2
22 October 2022	14:00	Ziraat Bankası	3–1	Galatasaray HDI Sigorta	20–25	25–13	25–17	25–17	–	95–72	Report 1 Report 2
28 October 2022	14:30	Galatasaray HDI Sigorta	3–1	Fenerbahçe HDI Sigorta	25–22	22–25	25–20	25–22	–	97–89	Report 1 Report 2
5 November 2022	13:00	Cizre Belediyespor	2–3	Galatasaray HDI Sigorta	27–29	25–17	20–25	25–21	9–15	106–107	Report 1 Report 2
12 November 2022	16:00	Galatasaray HDI Sigorta	3–1	Bursa Büyükşehir Belediyesi	33–31	21–25	25–20	25–16	–	104–92	Report 1 Report 2
19 November 2022	16:00	Develi Belediye	1–3	Galatasaray HDI Sigorta	21–25	25–20	20–25	20–25	–	86–95	Report 1 Report 2
26 November 2022	15:00	Galatasaray HDI Sigorta	2–3	TÜRŞAD	25–18	17–25	22–25	25–21	11–15	100–104	Report 1 Report 2
3 December 2022	13:00	Spor Toto	3–1	Galatasaray HDI Sigorta	20–25	27–25	25–23	25–19	–	97–92	Report 1 Report 2
9 December 2022	15:00	Galatasaray HDI Sigorta	3–0	Altekma Spor Kulübü	25–21	25–15	26–24	–	–	76–60	Report 1 Report 2
17 December 2022	15:00	Galatasaray HDI Sigorta	1–3	Arkas Spor	25–22	8–25	22–25	23–25	–	78–97	Report 1 Report 2

==== Regular season (2nd Half) ====
- All times are Europe Time (UTC+03:00).

Date	Time		Score		Set 1	Set 2	Set 3	Set 4	Set 5	Total	Report
7 January 2023	14:00	Galatasaray HDI Sigorta	3–1	Tokat Belediye Plevnespor	25–23	19–25	25–14	25–16	–	94–78	Report 1 Report 2
15 January 2023	15:00	Hekimoğlu Global Connect Travel Bvi	1–3	Galatasaray HDI Sigorta	21–25	19–25	26–24	24–26	–	90–100	Report 1 Report 2
22 January 2023	13:00	Galatasaray HDI Sigorta	3–0	Hatay Büyükşehir Belediye	25–15	25–19	25–21	–	–	75–55	Report 1 Report 2
30 January 2023	15:00	Halkbank	3–1	Galatasaray HDI Sigorta	25–17	26–28	25–19	25–20	–	101–84	Report 1 Report 2
3 February 2023	15:00	Galatasaray HDI Sigorta	2–3	Ziraat Bankası	23–25	25–22	26–24	17–25	29–31	120–127	Report 1 Report 2
5 March 2023	16:00	Fenerbahçe HDI Sigorta	3–1	Galatasaray HDI Sigorta	25–17	25–21	23–25	25–23	–	98–86	Report 1 Report 2
12 March 2023	14:00	Galatasaray HDI Sigorta	3–0	Cizre Belediyespor	25–19	25–23	25–19	–	–	75–61	Report 1 Report 2
19 March 2023	16:00	Bursa Büyükşehir Belediyesi	1–3	Galatasaray HDI Sigorta	25–19	17–25	20–25	22–25	–	84–94	Report 1 Report 2
22 March 2023	14:00	Galatasaray HDI Sigorta	3–1	Develi Belediye	25–18	25–21	20–25	25–18	–	95–82	Report 1 Report 2
26 March 2023	13:00	TÜRŞAD	3–1	Galatasaray HDI Sigorta	24–26	30–28	25–21	25–15	–	104–90	Report 1 Report 2
2 April 2023	15:00	Galatasaray HDI Sigorta	3–0	Spor Toto	25–1825	15–25	21–	–	–	61–1850	Report 1 Report 2
9 April 2023	16:00	Altekma Spor Kulübü	0–3	Galatasaray HDI Sigorta	13–25	25–27	21–25	–	–	59–77	Report 1 Report 2
12 April 2023	17:00	Arkas Spor	3–1	Galatasaray HDI Sigorta	25–22	25–19	22–25	25–21	–	97–87	Report 1 Report 2

==== Playoffs ====
===== 5–8th place =====
- All times are Europe Time (UTC+03:00).

Date	Time		Score		Set 1	Set 2	Set 3	Set 4	Set 5	Total	Report
22 April 2023	15:00	Galatasaray HDI Sigorta	3–0	TÜRŞAD	25–22	28–26	25–19	–	–	78–67	Report 1 Report 2
26 April 2023	18:00	TÜRŞAD	0–3	Galatasaray HDI Sigorta	17–25	21–25	23–25	–	–	61–75	Report 1 Report 2

===== 5–6th place =====
- All times are Europe Time (UTC+03:00).

Date	Time		Score		Set 1	Set 2	Set 3	Set 4	Set 5	Total	Report
4 May 2023	17:00	Bursa Büyükşehir Belediyesi	3–1	Galatasaray HDI Sigorta	25–20	21–25	25–23	27–25	–	98–93	Report 1 Report 2
8 May 2023	15:00	Galatasaray HDI Sigorta	3–0	Bursa Büyükşehir Belediyesi	25–22	25–20	25–19	–	–	75–61	Report 1 Report 2
11 May 2023	17:00	Bursa Büyükşehir Belediyesi	2–3	Galatasaray HDI Sigorta	18–25	25–13	23–25	25–21	7–15	98–99	Report 1 Report 2

=== Turkish Men's Volleyball Cup (AXA Sigorta Kupa Voley) ===
==== Group C ====
Pos	Team	Pld	W	L	Pts	SW	SL	SR	SPW	SPL	SPR
1	Galatasaray HDI Sigorta	3	2	1	7	8	3	2.667	257	229	1.122
2	Hekimoğlu Global Connect Travel Bvi	3	2	1	6	8	5	1.600	283	274	1.033
3	Cizre Belediyespor	3	2	1	5	6	5	1.200	239	242	0.988
4	Develi Belediye	3	0	3	0	0	9	0.000	198	232	0.853

===== Results =====
- All times are Europe Time (UTC+03:00).

Date	Time		Score		Set 1	Set 2	Set 3	Set 4	Set 5	Total	Report
23 September 2022	19:00	Galatasaray HDI Sigorta	3–0	Develi Belediye	25–22	25–23	25–21	–	–	75–66	Report 1 Report 2
24 September 2022	15:00	Hekimoğlu Global Connect Travel Bvi	3–2	Galatasaray HDI Sigorta	17–25	25–27	26–24	25–19	15–12	108–107	Report 1 Report 2
25 September 2022	16:00	Galatasaray HDI Sigorta	3–0	Cizre Belediyespor	25–23	25–14	25–18	–	–	75–55	Report 1 Report 2

==== Quarter-finals ====
- All times are Europe Time (UTC+03:00).

Date	Time		Score		Set 1	Set 2	Set 3	Set 4	Set 5	Total	Report
22 December 2022	18:00	Ziraat Bankası	3–2	Galatasaray HDI Sigorta	22–25	31–29	25–16	22–25	15–10	115–105	Report 1 Report 2

=== CEV Cup ===
==== 16th Finals ====
Date	Time		Score		Set 1	Set 2	Set 3	Set 4	Set 5	Total	Report
9 November 2022	19:30	Galatasaray HDI Sigorta (Turkey)	3–0	(Austria) Union Raiffeisen Waldviertel	25–19	25–17	25–23	–	–	75–59	Report 1 Report 2
15 November 2022	19:00 (21:00 TRT)	Union Raiffeisen Waldviertel (Austria)	0–3	(Turkey) Galatasaray HDI Sigorta	26–28	22–25	21–25	–	–	69–78	Report 1 Report 2

==== 8th Finals ====
Date	Time		Score		Set 1	Set 2	Set 3	Set 4	Set 5	Total	Report
29 November 2022	20:00	Galatasaray HDI Sigorta (Turkey)	2–3	(Switzerland) Chênois Genève	22–25	26–24	25–23	19–25	13–15	105–112	Report 1 Report 2
14 December 2022	22:00	Chênois Genève (Switzerland)	0–3	(Turkey) Galatasaray HDI Sigorta	14–25	22–25	22–25	–	–	58–75	Report 1 Report 2

==== Playoffs ====
Date	Time		Score		Set 1	Set 2	Set 3	Set 4	Set 5	Total	Report
10 January 2023	20:00	Galatasaray HDI Sigorta (Turkey)	1–3	(Poland) PGE Skra Bełchatów	20–25	25–17	22–25	21–25	–	88–92	Report 1 Report 2
26 January 2023	20:30	PGE Skra Bełchatów (Poland)	3–2	(Turkey) Galatasaray HDI Sigorta	25–23	19–25	26–24	23–25	15–13	108–110	Report 1 Report 2
