= 2011–12 Galatasaray S.K. (men's volleyball) season =

Galatasaray YK
2011–12 season
- Chairman: (Turkey) Ünal Aysal
- Manager: (Turkey) Işık Menküer

Galatasaray SK. Men's 2011–2012 season is the 2011–2012 volleyball season for Turkish professional basketball club Galatasaray Yurtiçi Kargo.

The club competes in:

- Turkish Men's Volleyball League
- Turkish Cup Volleyball

== Team roster season 2011–12 ==
As of 25 September 2011

Shirt No	Nationality	Player	Birth Date	Height	Position
1	Turkey	Ulaş Kıyak	November 8, 1981 (age 44)	183	Setter
2	Turkey	Akif Gürgen	April 2, 1977 (age 48)	206	Libero
3	Turkey	Ahmet Pezük	June 8, 1987 (age 38)	203	Middle Blocker
4	Turkey	Murathan Kısal	November 22, 1989 (age 36)	195	Middle Blocker
7	Turkey	İsmail Cem Kurtar	May 21, 1982 (age 43)	193	Opposite Hitter
8	Turkey	Tolga Altıntaş	January 14, 1980 (age 45)	196	Outside Hitter
9	Turkey	Kemal Kıvanç Elgaz	January 1, 1986 (age 39)	200	Opposite Hitter
10	Venezuela	Kervin Piñerua	January 22, 1991 (age 34)	191	Opposite Hitter
11	Turkey	Caner Pekşen	June 9, 1987 (age 38)	190	Setter
13	Cuba	Salvador Hidalgo Oliva	December 27, 1985 (age 39)	195	Outside Hitter
14	Turkey	Erhan Dünge	April 2, 1980 (age 45)	206	Middle Blocker
15	Turkey	Oğuzhan Tarakçı	April 23, 1993 (age 32)	195	Outside Hitter
16	Turkey	Ferhat Akdeniz	April 2, 1986 (age 39)	203	Middle Blocker
17	Turkey	Caner Dengin	December 15, 1987 (age 37)	188	Libero
18	Turkey	Serdar Semerci	July 21, 1980 (age 45)	194	Opposite Hitter

== Squad changes for the 2011–2012 season ==
In: Note: Flags indicate national team as defined under FIFA eligibility rules; some limited exceptions apply. Players may hold more than one non-FIFA nationality.

No.	Pos.	Nation	Player
1		TUR	Ulaş Kıyak (from İstanbul Büyükşehir Belediyesi)
2		TUR	Akif Gürgen (from MEF Okulları)
7		TUR	İsmail Cem Kurtar (from MEF Okulları)
10	PG	VEN	Kervin Piñerua (from SOS Villa María)
13		CUB	Salvador Hidalgo Oliva (from)
14		TUR	Erhan Dünge (from İstanbul Büyükşehir Belediyesi)
16		TUR	Ferhat Akdeniz (from MEF Okulları)
18		TUR	Serdar Semerci (from MEF Okulları)

Out: Note: Flags indicate national team as defined under FIFA eligibility rules; some limited exceptions apply. Players may hold more than one non-FIFA nationality.

No.	Pos.	Nation	Player
1		BRA	Ashlei Nemer (to)
9		TUR	Ali Peçen (to)
2		FRA	Yannick Bazin (to)
8		TUR	Volkan Güç (to)
4		TUR	Murathan Kısal (to)
10		FRA	Philippe Barca-Cysique (to)
16		TUR	Yasin Sancak (to)
5		TUR	Senad Ok (to)

== Results, schedules and standings ==
=== Preseason games ===
==== Black Sea Cup ====
2011-09-19; 20:00	Marek Union Dupniţa	0–3	Galatasaray Yurtiçi Kargo	Köstence, Romania
2011-09-19; 20:00	(14–25, 23–25, 14–26) (Report)			Köstence, Romania

2011-09-24; 19:00	OK NIS Vojvodina Novi Sad	0–3	Galatasaray Yurtiçi Kargo	Köstence, Romania
2011-09-24; 19:00	(15–25, 20–25, 23–25) (Report)			Köstence, Romania

2011-09-25; 13:00	CVM Tomis Constanța	3–2	Galatasaray Yurtiçi Kargo	Köstence, Romania
2011-09-25; 13:00	(25–20, 21–25, 25–22, 20–25, 15–7) (Report)			Köstence, Romania

Results

Pos.	Club	Points
1	(Romania) CVM Tomis Constanța	8
2	(Turkey) Galatasaray Yurtiçi Kargo	7
3	(Romania) Marek Union Dupniţa	4
4	(Serbia) OK NIS Vojvodina Novi Sad	0

2011-09-27	CSKA Sofia	2–3	Galatasaray Yurtiçi Kargo	Dobrich, Bulgaria
2011-09-27	(16–25, 26–24, 14–25, 25–15, 13–15) (Report)			Dobrich, Bulgaria

2011-09-28	CSKA Sofia	0–3	Galatasaray Yurtiçi Kargo	Dobrich, Bulgaria
2011-09-28	(18–25, 15–25, 22–25) (Report)			Dobrich, Bulgaria

==== Laale Cup ====
Galatasaray won the cup.

2011-11-18; 19:30	Noliko Maaseik	1–3	Galatasaray Yurtiçi Kargo	Germany
2011-11-18; 19:30	(Report)			Germany

2011-11-19; 19:30	Evivo Duren	0–3	Galatasaray Yurtiçi Kargo	Germany
2011-11-19; 19:30	(17–25, 23–25, 16–25) (Report)			Germany

=== Turkish Volleyball League 2011–12 ===
==== Regular season ====
October 12, 2011; 16:30	Niksar Belediye	0–3	Galatasaray Yurtiçi Kargo	Tokat Niksar Spor Salonu, Tokat
October 12, 2011; 16:30	(16–25, 22–25, 15–25) (Report)			Tokat Niksar Spor Salonu, Tokat

October 15, 2011; 15:00	Galatasaray Yurtiçi Kargo	3–2	Plevne Belediye	Burhan Felek Spor Salonu, Istanbul; Referees: Nurper Özbar, Gökhan Dağ
October 15, 2011; 15:00	(25–13, 18–25, 20–25, 25–22, 15–8) (Report)			Burhan Felek Spor Salonu, Istanbul; Referees: Nurper Özbar, Gökhan Dağ

October 23, 2011; 17:30	Fenerbahçe Grundig	3–1	Galatasaray Yurtiçi Kargo	Burhan Felek Spor Salonu, Istanbul; Referees: Erdal Akıncı, Ebru Meriçkan
October 23, 2011; 17:30	(20–25, 25–19, 25–20, 25–23) (Report)			Burhan Felek Spor Salonu, Istanbul; Referees: Erdal Akıncı, Ebru Meriçkan

October 30, 2011; 17:30	Galatasaray Yurtiçi Kargo	0–3	Halkbank	Burhan Felek Spor Salonu, Istanbul
October 30, 2011; 17:30	(23–25, 20–25, 23–25) (Report)			Burhan Felek Spor Salonu, Istanbul

November 2, 2011; 17:00	4 Eylül Belediye	3–1	Galatasaray Yurtiçi Kargo	4 Eylül Spor Salonu, Sivas
November 2, 2011; 17:00	(21–25, 25–20, 25–22, 26–24) (Report)			4 Eylül Spor Salonu, Sivas

December 10, 2011; 17:30	Galatasaray Yurtiçi Kargo	3–1	İstanbul BŞB	Burhan Felek Spor Salonu, Istanbul; Referees: Cihat Fırıncıoğlu, Barış Sümen
December 10, 2011; 17:30	(21–25, 25–18, 26–24, 25–14) (Report)			Burhan Felek Spor Salonu, Istanbul; Referees: Cihat Fırıncıoğlu, Barış Sümen

December 17, 2011; 13:00	Torul Gençlik	2–3	Galatasaray Yurtiçi Kargo	Torul Spor Salonu, Gümüşhane
December 17, 2011; 13:00	(21–25, 25–23, 23–25, 25–17, 13–15) (Report)			Torul Spor Salonu, Gümüşhane

December 24, 2011; 17:30	Galatasaray Yurtiçi Kargo	3–1	Maliye Milli Piyango	Burhan Felek Spor Salonu, Istanbul
December 24, 2011; 17:30	(26–24, 25–18, 18–25, 25–14) (Report)			Burhan Felek Spor Salonu, Istanbul

December 28, 2011; 16:00	Galatasaray Yurtiçi Kargo	3–0	Çankaya Belediyesi	Burhan Felek Spor Salonu, Istanbul
December 28, 2011; 16:00	(25–14, 25–16, 25–17) (Report)			Burhan Felek Spor Salonu, Istanbul

== Turkish Cup 2011–12 ==
December 7, 2011; 14:00	Tofaş S.K.	0–3	Galatasaray Yurtiçi Kargo	Atatürk Spor Salonu, Bursa
December 7, 2011; 14:00	(17–25, 12–25, 17–25) (Report)			Atatürk Spor Salonu, Bursa

== CEV Challenge Cup 2011–12 ==
December 14, 2011; 19:30	Galatasaray Yurtiçi Kargo	3–0	Teuta DURRES	Burhan Felek Spor Salonu, Istanbul; Attendance: 650; Referees: MAREV Chavdar, ZOTOVIC Svetlana
December 14, 2011; 19:30	(25–11, 25–13, 25–17) (Report)			Burhan Felek Spor Salonu, Istanbul; Attendance: 650; Referees: MAREV Chavdar, ZOTOVIC Svetlana

December 21, 2011; 15:00	Teuta DURRES	0–3	Galatasaray Yurtiçi Kargo	Asllan Rusi TIRANA, TIRANA; Referees: VOUDOURIS Konstantinos, BOTEZATU Cristian Eduard
December 21, 2011; 15:00	(13–25, 15–25, 14–25) (Report)			Asllan Rusi TIRANA, TIRANA; Referees: VOUDOURIS Konstantinos, BOTEZATU Cristian Eduard
