= 2023–24 Galatasaray S.K. (men's volleyball) season =

Galatasaray HDI Sigorta
2023–24 season
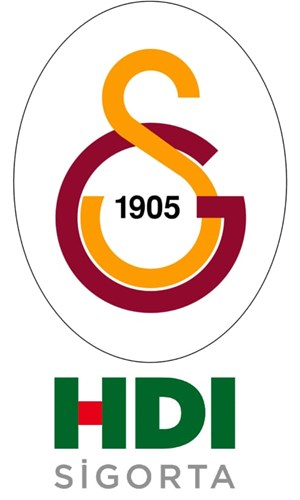
- President: Dursun Özbek
- Head coach: Umut Çakır
- Arena: TVF Burhan Felek Sport Hall
- Turkish Men's Volleyball League: 4th seed
- Playoffs: 4th
- Turkish Men's Volleyball Cup: Quarter-finals
- CEV Challenge Cup: Semi-finals

It is the 2023–24 season of the Men's Volleyball team of Galatasaray Sports Club.

== Overview ==
=== June ===
- On 14 June, it was announced that a new 2-year contract was signed with Head Coach Umut Çakır.

=== July ===
- On 19 July, the rival of Galatasaray Men's Volleyball team, which will compete in the CEV Challenge Cup in Europe this year, was determined in the draw held in Luxembourg. The rival of Galatasaray, which will be included in the organization from the Round of 16 Finals, is the Greek representative AOP Kifissia.

=== August ===
- On 14 August, Galatasaray Men's Volleyball Team 2023–24 Season Turkish Men's Volleyball League fixture has been announced.
- On 14 August, Galatasaray Men's Volleyball Team will compete in the 2023–24 Season Turkish Men's Volleyball Cup, the groups have been determined.
- On 18 August, Galatasaray Men's Volleyball Team players passed a full health check.
- On 22 August, Furkan Kasap has been appointed as assistant coach of Galatasaray Men's Volleyball Team.
- On 22 August, Turgay Aslanyürek has been appointed as Galatasaray Men's Volleyball Team conditioner.

=== December ===
Turkish Men's Volleyball Cup quarter-final pairings were announced on 20 December 2023.

== Sponsorship and kit manufacturers ==
- Supplier: Umbro
- Name sponsor: HDI Sigorta
- Main sponsor: HDI Sigorta
- Back sponsor: Tunç Holding
- Sleeve sponsor: A11 Hotels
- Lateral sponsor: —
- Short sponsor: A11 Hotels
- Socks sponsor: —
- Jersey upper chest sponsor: Steak Food By Gürkan Şef

== Technical staff ==
As of 21 November 2023

Name	Job
(Turkey) Neslihan Turan	Volleyball Teams Administrative Manager
(Turkey) Mehmetcan Şamlı	Team Manager
(Turkey) Umut Çakır	Head Coach
(Turkey) Hüseyin Gültekin	Assistant Coach
(Turkey) Furkan Kasap	Assistant Coach
(Turkey) Mertcan Kır	Statistics Coach
(Turkey) Yalçın Ayhan	Physiotherapist
(Turkey) Turgay Aslanyürek	Conditioner
(Turkey) Aykut Yılmaz	Masseur

== Team roster ==
As of 16 October 2023

No.	Player	Position	Date of Birth	Height (m)	Country
1	Nikola Mijailović	Outside Hitter	8 August 1989 (age 36)	1.91	Serbia
2	Jan Hadrava	Opposite	3 June 1991 (age 34)	1.99	Czech Republic
5	Baturalp Burak Güngör (c)	Outside Hitter	28 July 1993 (age 32)	1.90	Turkey
7	Ahmet Tümer	Middle Blocker	15 September 2001 (age 24)	2.03	Turkey
9	Beytullah Hatipoğlu	Libero	24 February 1992 (age 33)	1.95	Turkey
10	Muzaffer Yönet	Setter	18 June 1997 (age 28)	1.97	Turkey
11	Miran Kujundžić	Outside Hitter	19 June 1997 (age 28)	1.96	Serbia
12	Aykut Acar	Middle Blocker	14 February 2000 (age 25)	1.92	Turkey
13	Oğuzhan Karasu	Middle Blocker	16 June 1995 (age 30)	2.05	Turkey
14	Selim Kalaycı	Opposite	12 February 2000 (age 25)	2.02	Turkey
16	Onur Günaydı	Outside Hitter	28 September 2002 (age 23)	2.03	Turkey
17	Jan Zimmermann	Setter	12 February 1993 (age 32)	1.90	Germany
19	Ozan Ataseven	Libero	7 July 2004 (age 21)	N/A	Turkey
23	Osman Çağatay Durmaz	Middle Blocker	9 September 1996 (age 29)	2.00	Turkey

== Transfers ==
=== In ===
Date	Player	Transferred from	Fee	Source
14 June 2023	(Germany) Jan Zimmermann	(Italy) Vero Volley Monza	Free	
14 June 2023	(Serbia) Miran Kujundžić	(Poland) Ślepsk Malow Suwałki	Free	
14 June 2023	(Turkey) Ahmet Tümer	(Turkey) Fenerbahçe HDI Sigorta	Free	
14 June 2023	(Turkey) Osman Çağatay Durmaz	(Turkey) Spor Toto Spor Kulübü	Free	
23 June 2023	(Czech Republic) Jan Hadrava	(Poland) Jastrzębski Węgiel	Free	
23 June 2023	(Turkey) Ozan Ataseven	Youth system	N/A	
7 July 2023	(Serbia) Nikola Mijailović	(Italy) Volley Callipo	Free	
16 August 2023	(Turkey) Muzaffer Yönet	(Turkey) Altekma Spor Kulübü	Free	

=== Out ===
Date	Player	Transferred to	Fee	Source
7 June 2023	(Turkey) Selçuk Keskin	(Turkey) Spor Toto Spor Kulübü	End of contract	
7 June 2023	(Turkey) Hakkı Çapkınoğlu	(Turkey) Bursa Büyükşehir Belediyespor	End of contract	
8 June 2023	(Turkey) Melih Sıratça	(Turkey) Cizre Belediyespor	End of contract	
8 June 2023	(Turkey) Onurcan Çakır	(Turkey) Arkas Spor	End of contract	
8 June 2023	(Australia) Thomas Edgar	(United Arab Emirates) Al Ain FC	End of contract	
8 June 2023	(Iran) Morteza Sharifi	(Turkey) Spor Toto Spor Kulübü	End of contract	
9 June 2023	(Turkey) Emir Kaan Öztürk	(Turkey) Arkas Spor	End of contract	
9 June 2023	(Turkey) Fatih Eren Uğur	(Turkey) Türşad	End of contract	
7 July 2023	(Turkey) Yasin Aydın	(Turkey) Develi Belediye	End of contract	
27 July 2023	(Turkey) Orçun Ergün	(Turkey) Bursa Büyükşehir Belediyespor	End of contract	

=== Contracts renewals ===
Date	Player	Contract length	Source
15 June 2023	(Turkey) Beytullah Hatipoğlu	1-year	
15 June 2023	(Turkey) Oğuzhan Karasu	1-year	
23 June 2023	(Turkey) Aykut Acar	1-year	
23 June 2023	(Turkey) Selim Kalaycı	1-year	

== Pre-season and friendlies ==
Date	Time		Score		Set 1	Set 2	Set 3	Set 4	Set 5	Total	Report
26 September 2023	–	Galatasaray HDI Sigorta	2–2	Ziraat Bankası	23–25	25–22	15–25	25–14	–	88–86	Report
29 September 2023	–	Galatasaray HDI Sigorta	3–0	İstanbul Büyükşehir Belediyespor	25–19	25–23	25–18	–	–	75–60	Report
3 October 2023	–	Galatasaray HDI Sigorta	3–2	Rapid București	25–21	25–19	26–28	18–25	15–9	109–102	Report
6 October 2023	–	Galatasaray HDI Sigorta	2–2	Rapid București	16–25	36–34	25–16	22–25	–	99–100	Report

== Competitions ==
=== Turkish Men's Volleyball League ===
==== League table ====
Qualified for the Play-off (1st-4th)
Qualified for the Play-off (5th-8th)
Qualified for the Turkish Men's Volleyball First League

Pos	Team	Pld	W	L	Pts	SW	SL	SR	SPW	SPL	SPR	Qualification
1	Kuşgöz İzmir Vinç Akkuş Belediye	0	0	0	0	0	0	—	0	0	—	Play-off (1st-4th)
2	Arkas Spor	0	0	0	0	0	0	—	0	0	—	Play-off (1st-4th)
3	Bigadiç Belediyespor	0	0	0	0	0	0	—	0	0	—	Play-off (1st-4th)
4	Brand Group Alanya Belediyespor	0	0	0	0	0	0	—	0	0	—	Play-off (1st-4th)
5	Bursa Büyükşehir Belediyesi	0	0	0	0	0	0	—	0	0	—	Play-off (5th-8th)
6	Develi Belediye	0	0	0	0	0	0	—	0	0	—	Play-off (5th-8th)
7	Fenerbahçe Parolapara	0	0	0	0	0	0	—	0	0	—	Play-off (5th-8th)
8	Galatasaray HDI Sigorta	0	0	0	0	0	0	—	0	0	—	Play-off (5th-8th)
9	Halkbank	0	0	0	0	0	0	—	0	0	—	
10	Hatay Büyükşehir Belediyespor	0	0	0	0	0	0	—	0	0	—	
11	Rams Global Cizre Belediyespor	0	0	0	0	0	0	—	0	0	—	
12	Spor Toto Spor Kulübü	0	0	0	0	0	0	—	0	0	—	
13	Türşad	0	0	0	0	0	0	—	0	0	—	Turkish Men's Volleyball First League
14	Ziraat Bankası	0	0	0	0	0	0	—	0	0	—	Turkish Men's Volleyball First League

Updated to match(es) played on 1 October 2023. Source: 2023-2024 Efeler Ligi
Rules for classification: 1) Games won 2) Points 3) Set ratio 4) Setpoint ratio

==== Regular season (1st Half) ====
- All times are Europe Time (UTC+03:00).

Date	Time		Score		Set 1	Set 2	Set 3	Set 4	Set 5	Total	Report
18 October 2023	15:00	Arkas Spor	2–3	Galatasaray HDI Sigorta	25–19	22–25	25–18	19–25	10–15	101–102	Report 1 Report 2
22 October 2023	15:00	Galatasaray HDI Sigorta	3–0	Rams Global Cizre Belediyespor	25–20	25–18	25–18	–	–	75–56	Report 1 Report 2
25 October 2023	18:00	Kuşgöz İzmir Vinç Akkuş Belediye	0–3	Galatasaray HDI Sigorta	23–25	15–25	21–25	–	–	59–75	Report 1 Report 2
29 October 2023	18:30	Galatasaray HDI Sigorta	3–0	Bursa Büyükşehir Belediyesi	25–22	25–20	25–21	–	–	75–63	Report 1 Report 2
5 November 2023	14:00	Hatay Büyükşehir Belediyespor	0–3	Galatasaray HDI Sigorta	19–25	15–25	25–27	–	–	59–77	Report 1 Report 2
12 November 2023	16:00	Galatasaray HDI Sigorta	2–3	Fenerbahçe Parolapara	35–33	25–19	21–25	15–25	15–17	111–119	Report 1 Report 2
15 November 2023	18:00	Spor Toto Spor Kulübü	1–3	Galatasaray HDI Sigorta	17–25	21–25	25–21	21–25	–	84–96	Report 1 Report 2
19 November 2023	14:00	Galatasaray HDI Sigorta	3–0	Türşad	25–12	25–22	25–19	–	–	75–53	Report 1 Report 2
26 November 2023	17:00	Develi Belediye	3–2	Galatasaray HDI Sigorta	17–25	25–19	25–21	22–25	15–9	104–99	Report 1 Report 2
4 December 2023	16:00	Galatasaray HDI Sigorta	3–0	Bigadiç Belediyespor	25–12	25–18	25–23	–	–	75–53	Report 1 Report 2
10 December 2023	14:00	Brand Group Alanya Belediyespor	2–3	Galatasaray HDI Sigorta	26–24	25–22	17–25	14–25	10–15	92–111	Report 1 Report 2
17 December 2023	14:00	Galatasaray HDI Sigorta	1–3	Halkbank	18–25	15–25	25–19	18–25	–	76–94	Report 1 Report 2
23 December 2023	16:00	Galatasaray HDI Sigorta	2–3	Ziraat Bankası	21–25	27–25	17–25	28–26	9–15	102–116	Report 1 Report 2

==== Regular season (2nd Half) ====
- All times are Europe Time (UTC+03:00).

Date	Time		Score		Set 1	Set 2	Set 3	Set 4	Set 5	Total	Report
6 January 2024	14:00	Galatasaray HDI Sigorta	1–3	Arkas Spor	26–24	21–25	22–25	13–25	–	82–99	Report 1 Report 2
13 January 2024	14:00	Rams Global Cizre Belediyespor	0–3	Galatasaray HDI Sigorta	20–25	17–25	15–25	–	–	52–75	Report 1 Report 2
20 January 2024	15:00	Galatasaray HDI Sigorta	2–3	Kuşgöz İzmir Vinç Akkuş Belediye	25–20	30–32	20–25	25–21	11–15	111–113	Report 1 Report 2
27 January 2024	15:00	Bursa Büyükşehir Belediyesi	2–3	Galatasaray HDI Sigorta	19–25	25–19	19–25	25–20	12–15	100–104	Report 1 Report 2
3 February 2024	17:30	Galatasaray HDI Sigorta	3–0	Hatay Büyükşehir Belediyespor	25–18	25–12	25–23	–	–	75–53	Report 1 Report 2
10 February 2024	19:00	Fenerbahçe Parolapara	3–2	Galatasaray HDI Sigorta	27–29	25–23	25–27	25–18	15–13	117–110	Report 1 Report 2
17 February 2024	14:00	Galatasaray HDI Sigorta	3–1	Spor Toto Spor Kulübü	15–25	25–15	25–19	25–18	–	90–77	Report 1 Report 2
24 February 2024	13:00	Türşad	1–3	Galatasaray HDI Sigorta	16–25	25–23	22–25	20–25	–	83–98	Report 1 Report 2
2 March 2024	14:00	Galatasaray HDI Sigorta	3–0	Develi Belediye	25–23	25–23	25–19	–	–	75–65	Report 1 Report 2
5 March 2024	16:00	Bigadiç Belediyespor	0–3	Galatasaray HDI Sigorta	15–25	11–25	22–25	–	–	48–75	Report 1 Report 2
9 March 2024	13:00	Galatasaray HDI Sigorta	1–3	Brand Group Alanya Belediyespor	25–18	22–25	24–26	22–25	–	93–94	Report 1 Report 2
16 March 2024	17:00	Halkbank	3–0	Galatasaray HDI Sigorta	25–16	25–21	25–21	–	–	75–58	Report 1 Report 2
23 March 2024	14:00	Ziraat Bankası	1–3	Galatasaray HDI Sigorta	25–20	16–25	19–25	17–25	–	77–95	Report 1 Report 2

==== Playoffs ====
===== 1–4th place =====
- All times are Europe Time (UTC+03:00).

Date	Time		Score		Set 1	Set 2	Set 3	Set 4	Set 5	Total	Report
2 April 2024	18:00	Halkbank	3–0	Galatasaray HDI Sigorta	25–15	25–19	25–17	–	–	75–51	Report 1 Report 2
5 April 2024	14:00	Galatasaray HDI Sigorta	1–3	Halkbank	25–23	15–25	23–25	19–25	–	82–98	Report 1 Report 2

===== 3–4th place =====
- All times are Europe Time (UTC+03:00).

Date	Time		Score		Set 1	Set 2	Set 3	Set 4	Set 5	Total	Report
12 April 2024	14:00	Ziraat Bankası	3–0	Galatasaray HDI Sigorta	25–20	25–20	25–18	–	–	75–58	Report 1 Report 2
16 April 2024	18:00	Galatasaray HDI Sigorta	0–3	Ziraat Bankası	13–25	19–25	20–25	–	–	52–75	Report 1 Report 2

=== Turkish Men's Volleyball Cup ===
==== Group A ====
Pos	Team	Pld	W	L	Pts	SW	SL	SR	SPW	SPL	SPR
1	Galatasaray HDI Sigorta	2	2	0	6	6	0	MAX	150	116	1.293
2	Develi Belediye	2	1	1	2	3	5	0.600	169	178	0.949
3	Bigadiç Belediyespor	2	0	2	1	2	6	0.333	157	182	0.863

Source: 2023-2024 Erkekler Kupa Voley

===== Results =====
- All times are Europe Time (UTC+03:00).

Date	Time		Score		Set 1	Set 2	Set 3	Set 4	Set 5	Total	Report
13 October 2023	14:00	Develi Belediye	0–3	Galatasaray HDI Sigorta	22–25	21–25	19–25	–	–	62–75	Report 1 Report 2
14 October 2023	14:00	Galatasaray HDI Sigorta	3–0	Bigadiç Belediyespor	25–19	25–17	25–18	–	–	75–54	Report 1 Report 2

==== Quarter-finals ====
- All times are Europe Time (UTC+03:00).

Date	Time		Score		Set 1	Set 2	Set 3	Set 4	Set 5	Total	Report
13 February 2024	15:00	Arkas Spor	3–1	Galatasaray HDI Sigorta	24–26	29–27	25–20	25–17	–	103–90	Report 1 Report 2

=== CEV Challenge Cup ===
==== 16th finals ====
- All times are Europe Time (UTC+03:00).

Date	Time		Score		Set 1	Set 2	Set 3	Set 4	Set 5	Total	Report
22 November 2023	20:00	AOP Kifisias Athens (Greece)	0–3	(Turkey) Galatasaray HDI Sigorta	22–25	15–25	23–25	–	–	60–75	Report 1 Report 2
30 November 2023	18:00	Galatasaray HDI Sigorta (Turkey)	3–0	(Greece) AOP Kifisias Athens	25–17	25–23	25–20	–	–	75–60	Report 1 Report 2

==== 8th finals ====
- All times are Europe Time (UTC+03:00).

Date	Time		Score		Set 1	Set 2	Set 3	Set 4	Set 5	Total	Report
13 December 2023	21:00	Pénzügyőr SE Budapest (Hungary)	1–3	(Turkey) Galatasaray HDI Sigorta	25–23	19–25	14–25	20–25	–	78–98	Report 1 Report 2
19 December 2023	19:00	Galatasaray HDI Sigorta (Turkey)	3–0	(Hungary) Pénzügyőr SE Budapest	25–12	25–18	25–20	–	–	75–50	Report 1 Report 2

==== Quarter-finals ====
- All times are Europe Time (UTC+03:00).

Date	Time		Score		Set 1	Set 2	Set 3	Set 4	Set 5	Total	Report
10 January 2024	00:30	Fonte Bastardo Azores (Portugal)	0–3	(Turkey) Galatasaray HDI Sigorta	24–26	19–25	23–25	–	–	66–76	Report 1 Report 2
17 January 2024	20:00	Galatasaray HDI Sigorta (Turkey)	3–1	(Portugal) Fonte Bastardo Azores	21–25	25–23	25–16	25–23	–	96–87	Report 1 Report 2

==== Semi-finals ====
- All times are Europe Time (UTC+03:00).

Date	Time		Score		Set 1	Set 2	Set 3	Set 4	Set 5	Total	Report
31 January 2024	22:00	Vero Volley Monza (Italy)	3–0	(Turkey) Galatasaray HDI Sigorta	25–17	25–14	25–16	–	–	75–47	Report 1 Report 2
6 February 2024	20:00	Galatasaray HDI Sigorta (Turkey)	2–3	(Italy) Vero Volley Monza	16–25	20–25	25–21	25–22	12–15	98–108	Report 1 Report 2
