= Işıl =

- Gender: Female

Origin
- Language: Turkish
- Meaning: "Shining", "Sparkling", "Bright", "Brilliant"

Other names
- Related names: Işılay, Işık, Işın

Işıl is a feminine Turkish given name. In Turkish, "Işıl" means "Shining", "Sparkling", "Bright", "Brilliant". It is often used to describe something magnificent, shining, or sparkling a lot. People named Işıl include:

== People ==
=== Given names ===
- Işıl Alaş (born 2006), Turkish rhythmic gymnast
- Işıl Alben (born 1986), Turkish female basketball player
- Işıl Eğrikavuk (born 1980), Turkish actress
- Işıl German (1953–2016), Turkish singer
- Işıl Yücesoy (born 1945), Turkish singer and actres
- Işıl Zafer (born 2004), Turkish taekwondo practitioner

=== Middle name ===
- Ayşe Işıl Karakaş (1958–2024), Turkish academic
- Saadet Işıl Aksoy (born 1983), Turkish actress
