= Isin (disambiguation) =

Isin is an ancient city in Mesopotamia.

Isin or ISIN may also refer to:

== Places ==
- Isin Rural District, Iran
- Isin, Nigeria
- Isín, Spain

== People ==
- First Dynasty of Isin (1953–1717 BCE), a Sumerian dynasty, the final ruling dynasty appearing on the King List of Sumer
- Second Dynasty of Isin (1153–1022 BCE), a Babylonian dynasty
- Işın, a Turkish given name

=== Persons ===
==== People with the given name ====
- Nisio Isin (born 1981), Japanese novelist
- Işın Karaca (born 1973), British-born Turkish pop star

==== People with the surname ====
- Deniz Işın (born 1992), Turkish actress

== Other uses ==
- International Securities Identification Number
- Işın Show (TV series), a 2005 Turkish talk show
- TCG Işın, ships of the Turkish navy
