= TCG Işın =

TCG Işın is the name of the following ships of the Turkish Navy:

- TCG Işın (A 589), ex-USS Safeguard (ARS-25), a Diver-class rescue and salvage ship acquired in 1979, decommissioned in 2017, sunk as target in 2021
- TCG Işın (A 583), a rescue and salvage ship commissioned in 2017

== See also ==
- Işın
- Işın (disambiguation)
