= Işık (disambiguation) =

Işık (Turkish: Light) is a Turkish name. It may also refer to:

- Işık faith or Ishikism, syncretic religious movement among Alevis
- Işık University, private university in Istanbul, Turkey
- Işık Doğudan Yükselir, 1995 album by Sezen Aksu
