= Vahap =

Vahap is a Turkish given name for males. Notable people with the name include:

- Vahap Işık (born 1982), Turkish footballer
- Vahap Özaltay (1908–1965), Turkish footballer and coach
- Vahap Şanal (born 1998), Turkish chess grandmaster
