= Turkey national volleyball team =

Turkey national volleyball team may refer to:

- Turkey men's national volleyball team
- Turkey women's national volleyball team
