= Işık =

Işık is a unisex Turkish name and a surname. Notable people with the name are follows:

== Given name ==
=== First name ===
- Işık Koşaner (born 1945), Turkish general
- Işık Kaan Arslan (born 2001), Turkish football player
- Işık Menküer (born 1964), Turkish volleyball player and coach

=== Middle name ===
- Ocak Işık Yurtçu (1945–2012), Turkish reporter

== Surname ==
- Ayhan Işık (1929-1979), Turkish film actor
- Fatma Işık (born 1991), Turkish-German football player
- Fikri Işık (born 1965), Turkish educator and politician
- Hasan Esat Işık (1916–1989), Turkish diplomat and politician
- Hüseyin Hilmi Işık (1911-2001), Turkish Islamic scholar
- Mehmet Esat Işık (1865–1936), Turkish physician
- Nejla Işık, Turkish environmental activist and community leader
- Selen Pınar Işık, known as PuCCa (writer) (born 1987), Turkish writer
- Vahap Işık (born 1982), Turkish football player
- Volkan Işık (born 1967), Turkish rally driver

== Fictional characters ==
- Arif Işık, main character in the 2018 Turkish film Arif V 216
