= Dariusz Stanicki =

Polish volleyball player (born 1965)

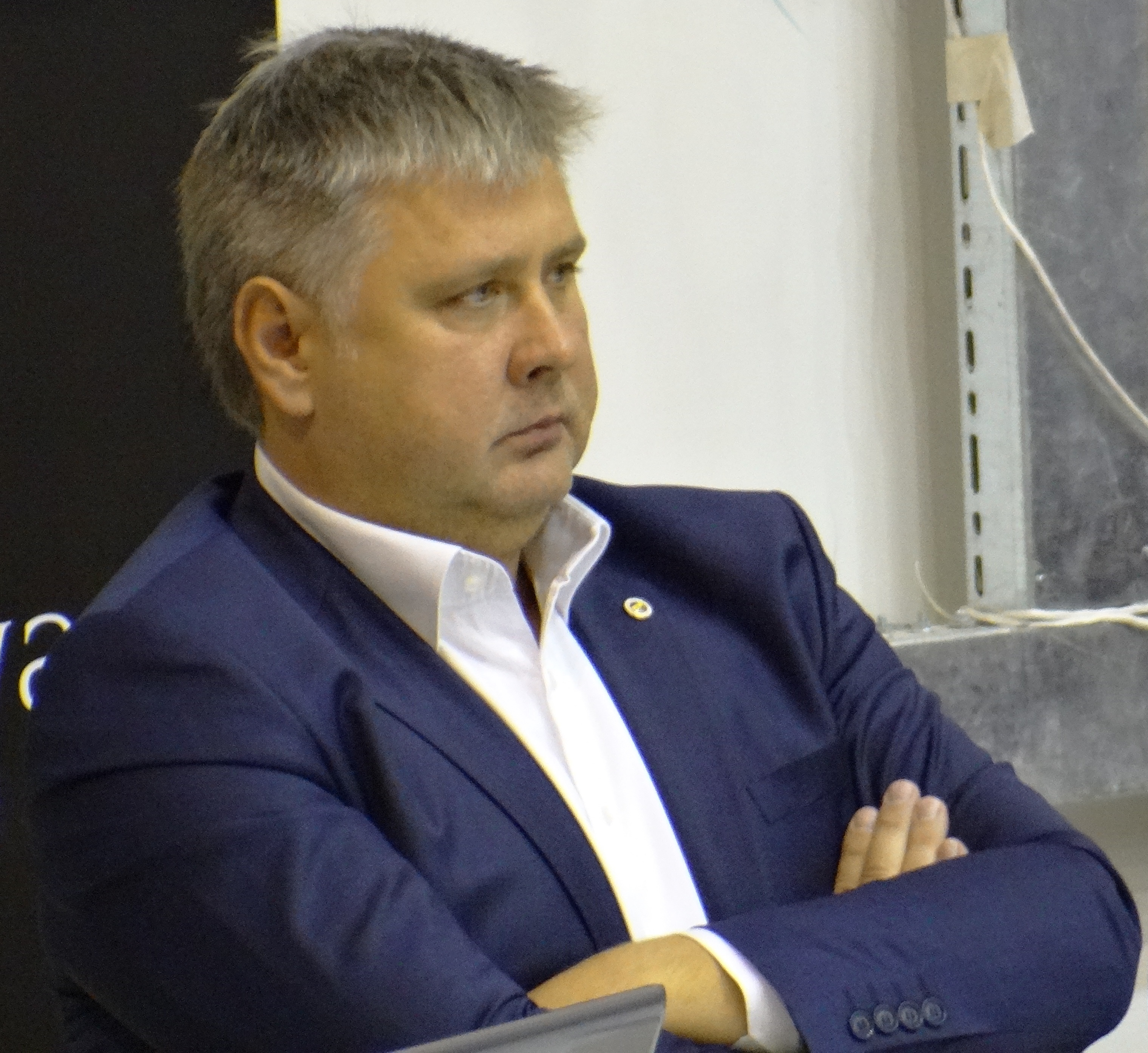
- Stanicki in 2017

Personal information
- Nationality: Polish
- Born: 3 January 1965 (age 61); Warsaw, Poland
- Height: 1.90 m (6 ft 3 in)

Career
Years	Teams
1980–1982; 1982–1985; 1985–1990; 1990–1991; 1991–1993; 1993–1999; 1999–2001; 2001–2002	RKS Raków Częstochowa; AZS Częstochowa; Płomień Sosnowiec; AZS Częstochowa; Fortuna Bonn; Halkbank Ankara; Netaş Istanbul; Galatasaray Istanbul; Gwardia Wrocław

National team
1983–1991	Poland (143)

Dariusz Stanicki (born 3 January 1965) is a former Polish volleyball player. He was a member of Poland men's national volleyball team in 1983–1991, technic manager of Fenerbahçe Men's Volleyball and Fenerbahçe Women's Volleyball teams.
