= Nuri Şahin (volleyball) =

Turkish volleyball player (born 1980)

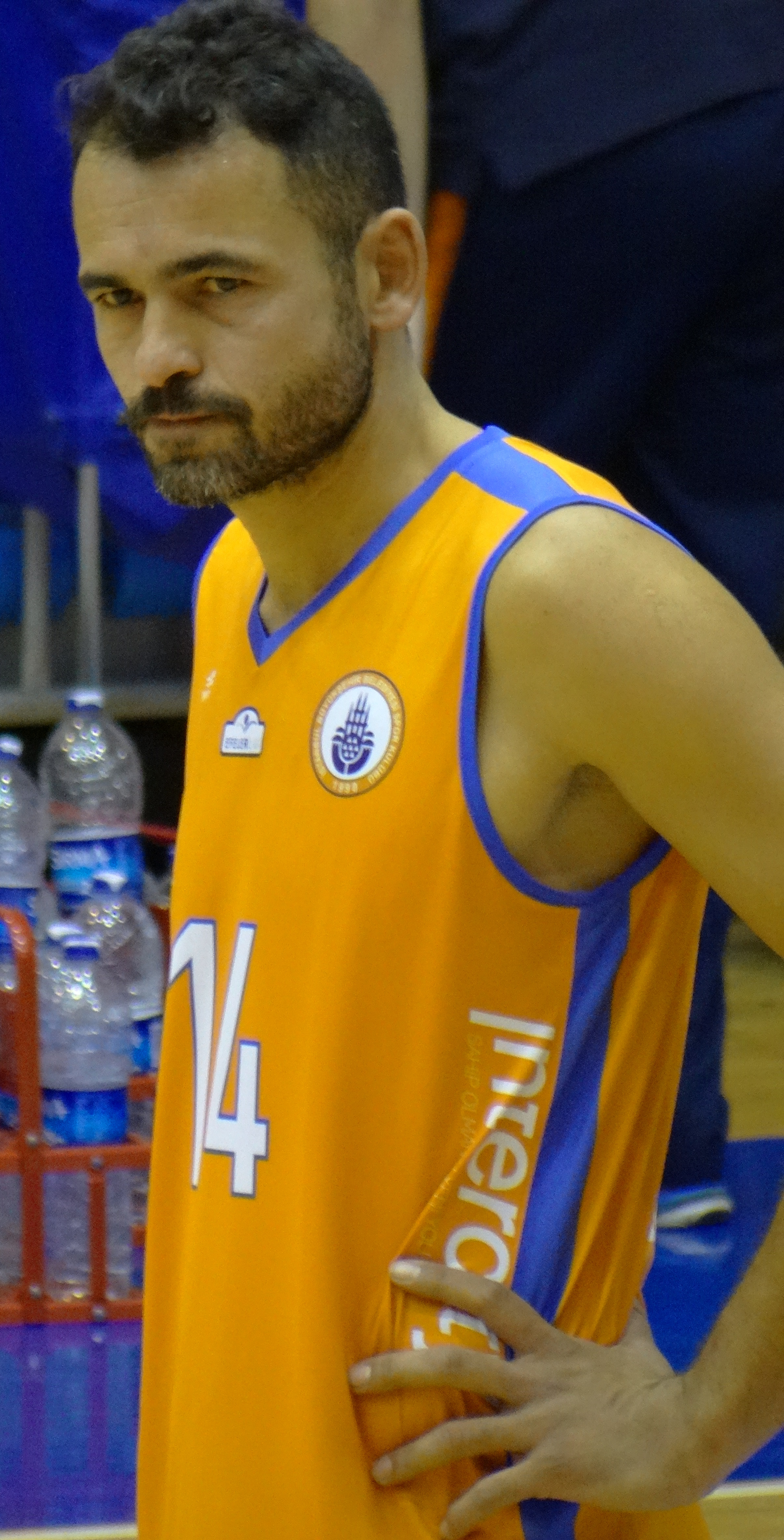

Personal information
- Full name: Nuri Şahin
- Born: January 1, 1980 (age 46); Tokat, Turkey
- Height: 1.97 m (6 ft 6 in)
- Weight: 91 kg (201 lb)
- Spike: 330 cm (130 in)
- Block: 325 cm (128 in)

Volleyball information
- Position: Libero
- Current club: (Turkey) Halkbank Ankara
- Number: 14

Career
Years	Teams
1994–1995; 1995–2002; 2002–2003; 2003–2004; 2004–2008; 2008–2012; 2012–	(Turkey) Eczacıbaşı (Turkey) Galatasaray (Turkey) Emlak Bankası (Turkey) Arçelik (Turkey) Fenerbahçe (Turkey) Arkas Izmir (Turkey) Halkbank Ankara

National team
Turkey
Honours
Representing Turkey
Men's volleyball
Universiade
Gold medal – first place	2005 İzmir
- Last updated: April 30, 2015

Nuri Şahin (Turkish pronunciation: [ˈnuɾi ʃaːˈhin]; born January 1, 1980) is a Turkish volleyball player. He is 1.97 m (6 ft 6 in) tall at 91 kg (201 lb), and plays as libero. He capped 155 times for the Turkey men's national volleyball team. As of 2012-13 season, Şahin plays for Halkbank Ankara and wears number 5. He studied at Marmara University.

Born on January 1, 1980, in Tokat, Şahin began playing volleyball in primary school. In 1994, he went professional at Eczacıbaşı. He was then a member of Galatasaray, Emlakbank, Arçelik, Fenerbahçe and Arkas Spor Izmir before he transferred in July 2012 to Halkbank Ankara.

Nuri Şahin is married since 2006 and has a son, Alp Toğan Şahin, born in 2011.

He was a member of the Turkey men's national volleyball team, which was the champion at the 2005 Summer Universiade held in İzmir, Turkey. He won the Men's CEV Cup 2012–13 with Halkbank Ankara and was named "Best Receiver" of the tournament.

== Sporting achievements ==
=== Clubs ===
- Men's CEV Cup 2012–13 - Champion with Halkbank Ankara

==== National championships ====
- 2014/2015 Turkish SuperCup2014, with Halkbank Ankara
- 2014/2015 Turkish Cup, with Halkbank Ankara
- 2014/2015 Turkish Championship, with Halkbank Ankara

=== Individual ===
- Men's CEV Cup 2012–13 "Best Receiver"

=== National team ===
- 2005 Summer Universiade - Gold
