= Emin Gök =

Turkish volleyball player (born 1988)

Personal information
- Born: 15 February 1988 (age 38); Mersin, Turkey
- Height: 2.04 m (6 ft 8 in)

Volleyball information
- Position: Middle Player
- Current club: (Turkey) Fenerbahçe Grundig
- Number: 13

National team
2013	Turkey

Emin Gök (born 15 February 1988 in Mersin) is a Turkish volleyball player. He is currently a player of the Fenerbahçe Grundig. He also played for Arkas Spor between 2007–2013.
