= Işın =

- Gender: Female

Origin
- Language: Turkish
- Meaning: Beam (of light), ray (of light), gleam

Other names
- Related names: Işık, Işıl

Işın is a common Turkish given name. In Turkish, Işın means "beam (of light)", "ray (of light)", and "gleam".

== People ==
=== Given name ===
- Işın Karaca (born 1973), Turkish-Cypriot pop music singer
- Işın Özdemir, a Turkish author

=== Surname ===
- Deniz Işın
