= Osman Çağatay Durmaz =

Turkish volleyball player (born 1996)

Personal information
- Full name: Osman Çağatay Durmaz
- Born: 9 September 1996 (age 30); Eskişehir, Turkey
- Height: 2.00 m (6 ft 6 1/2 in)
- Weight: 86 kg (190 lb)
- Spike: 360 cm (140 in)
- Block: 350 cm (140 in)

Volleyball information
- Position: Middle-blocker
- Current club: Fenerbahçe
- Number: 7

Career
Years
- 2011–2012
- 2014–2018
- 2018–2019
- 2019–2021
- 2021–2023
- 2023–2024
- 2024–
Teams
- Arkas Spor II
- Arkas Spor
- Maliye Piyango
- Arkas Spor
- Spor Toto Spor Kulübü
- Galatasaray HDI Sigorta
- Fenerbahçe

National team
Turkey

Osman Çağatay Durmaz (born 9 September 1996) is a Turkish volleyball player of Fenerbahçe.

== Club career ==
On 14 June 2023, he signed a new 2-year contract with Galatasaray HDI Sigorta.
