= Halil İbrahim Yücel =

Turkish volleyball player (born 1989)

Personal information
- Nationality: Turkish
- Born: November 24, 1989 (age 36)
- Height: 1.95 cm (1 in)
- Weight: 92 kg (203 lb)
- Spike: 345 cm (136 in)
- Block: 325 cm (128 in)

Volleyball information
- Position: Outside hitter
- Current club: (Turkey) Ziraat Bankası Ankara
- Number: 8

Career
Years	Teams
2011-2013; 2013-2015; 2015-2017; 2017-2019; 2019-	(Turkey) Halkbank Ankara (Turkey) Arkas Spor Izmir (Turkey) Galatasaray SK (Turkey) Maliye Milli Piyango SK (Turkey) Ziraat Bankası Ankara

Halil İbrahim Yücel (born November 24, 1989) is a Turkish volleyball player, a member of the club Ziraat Bankası Ankara.

== Sporting achievements ==
=== Clubs ===
Turkish Championship:

- 2015
- 2013
- 2012

Turkish Cup:

- 2013

CEV Cup:

- 2013
