= Ali Çayır =

Turkish volleyball player (born 1981)

Personal information
- Full name: Ali Alp Çayır
- Born: September 13, 1981 (age 45); Ankara, Turkey
- Height: 1.97 m (6 ft 5 1/2 in)

Volleyball information
- Position: Opposite Hitter
- Current club: Jastrzębski Węgiel
- Number: 8

Career
Years	Teams
1999-2000; 2000-2001; 2001-2002; 2002-2003; 2003-2005; 2005-2007; 2007-2009; 2009-present 2013-2014	SSK; Emlak Bank; Kollejliler; Tokat Plevne; Halkbank; İstanbul B.B. Galatasaray; Jastrzębski Węgiel; Gümüshane Torul Genclik

National team
2003-present	Turkey

Ali Çayır (born September 13, 1981) is a Turkish volleyball player. He is 197 cm. He plays for Jastrzębski Węgiel Team since 2009 season start and wear 8 number. He played 150 times for national team. He also played for SSK, Emlak Bank, Kollejliler, Tokat Plevne, Halkbank, İstanbul Büyükşehir Belediyesi and Galatasaray.
