= Işılay =

Turkish surname

Işılay (IPA: [ɯˈʃɯlaj]) is a Turkish surname and female given name formed by the combination of the Turkish words ışıl ("brilliant; sparkling, shining, radiant") and ay ("moon") – thus literally meaning "sparkling moon" – and may refer to:

- Işılay Saygın (1947–2019), Turkish architect, politician and four-time government minister
- Eftalya Işılay (1891–1939), Turkish singer of Greek descent
- Emir Işılay (born 1978), Turkish jazz and film composer and pianist
