= Hakan Fertelli =

Turkish volleyball player (born 1975)

Hakan Fertelli (born February 2, 1975, in Çorum) is a Turkish volleyball player. He is 1.99m tall and plays as a middle player. He plays for Fenerbahçe Grundig. He has played over 110 times for the national team. He also played for Eczacıbaşı, Marmara Koleji, Galatasaray and Arçelik.
