= Murat Aslan =

Turkish volleyball player (born 1986)

Personal information
- Full name: Murat Aslan
- Born: December 13, 1986 (age 39); Turkey
- Height: 1.92 m (6 ft 3 1/2 in)

Volleyball information
- Position: Libero
- Current club: (Turkey) Galatasaray
- Number: ?

Career
Years	Teams
2011-present	Galatasaray

Murat Aslan (born December 13, 1986) is a Turkish volleyball player. He plays for Galatasaray and also has 48 caps with the national team.
