= PuCCa (writer) =

Turkish writer

- Born: Selen Pınar Işık; 3 June 1987 (age 39); Karşıyaka, İzmir, Turkey
- Spouse: Osman Karagöz (m. 2015; div. 2019)
- Children: 1
- Writing career
- Notable work: Küçük Aptalın Büyük Dünyası

Selen Pınar Işık (born 3 June 1987), better known as PuCCa, is a Turkish writer and Internet celebrity.

== Life ==
Selen Pınar Işık was born in İzmir. She was 8 years old when her parents divorced, after which she lived with her mother for a while and experienced domestic violence at the hands of her stepfather. She later went to live with her father together with her sister. After graduating from Karşıyaka Girls High School, she moved from İzmir to Ankara to enroll in a university. During the period, she presented a radio program at a small station, and later started working as an editor for a television channel. She studied Radio, Television, Cinema and Journalism. During this period, she gained experience in blogging. She started to write on blogs and began to publish writings on Twitter as well. In 2010, she decided to turn her blog posts into a book and wrote Küçük Aptalın Büyük Dünyası. The book was adapted to a movie in 2014 under the name Hadi İnşallah.

In 2018, after posting a controversial tweet, her house was searched by the police. Although she stated that she was referring to her son Batı in her tweet, her house was searched by the authorities due to possible connections to terrorist groups and dispatching people towards rebellion. In the same year, she was arrested for encouraging drug use, and one of her tweets was cited as a reason for this action. In the case opened in 2019, she was sentenced to 7 years in prison, which was later reduced to 5 years and 10 months. She was also fined by the court to pay ₺66,660.

== Bibliography ==
- Küçük Aptalın Büyük Dünyası, 2010, Okuyan Us Publishing
- Ve Geri Kalan Her Şey, 2011, Okuyan Us Publishing
- Allah Beni Böyle Yaratmış, 2012, Okuyan Us Publishing
- Ay Hadi İnşallah!, 2013, Okuyan Us Publishing
- O Adam Buraya Gelecek, 2015, DEX
- PuCCa Günlük - Pembe, 2016, DEX
- PuCCa Günlük - Siyah, 2016, DEX
- Şimdi Biz Neyiz?, 2017, DEX
- Peki Ya Şimdi?, 2019, İndigo
