= İbrahim Emet =

Turkish volleyball player (born 1986)

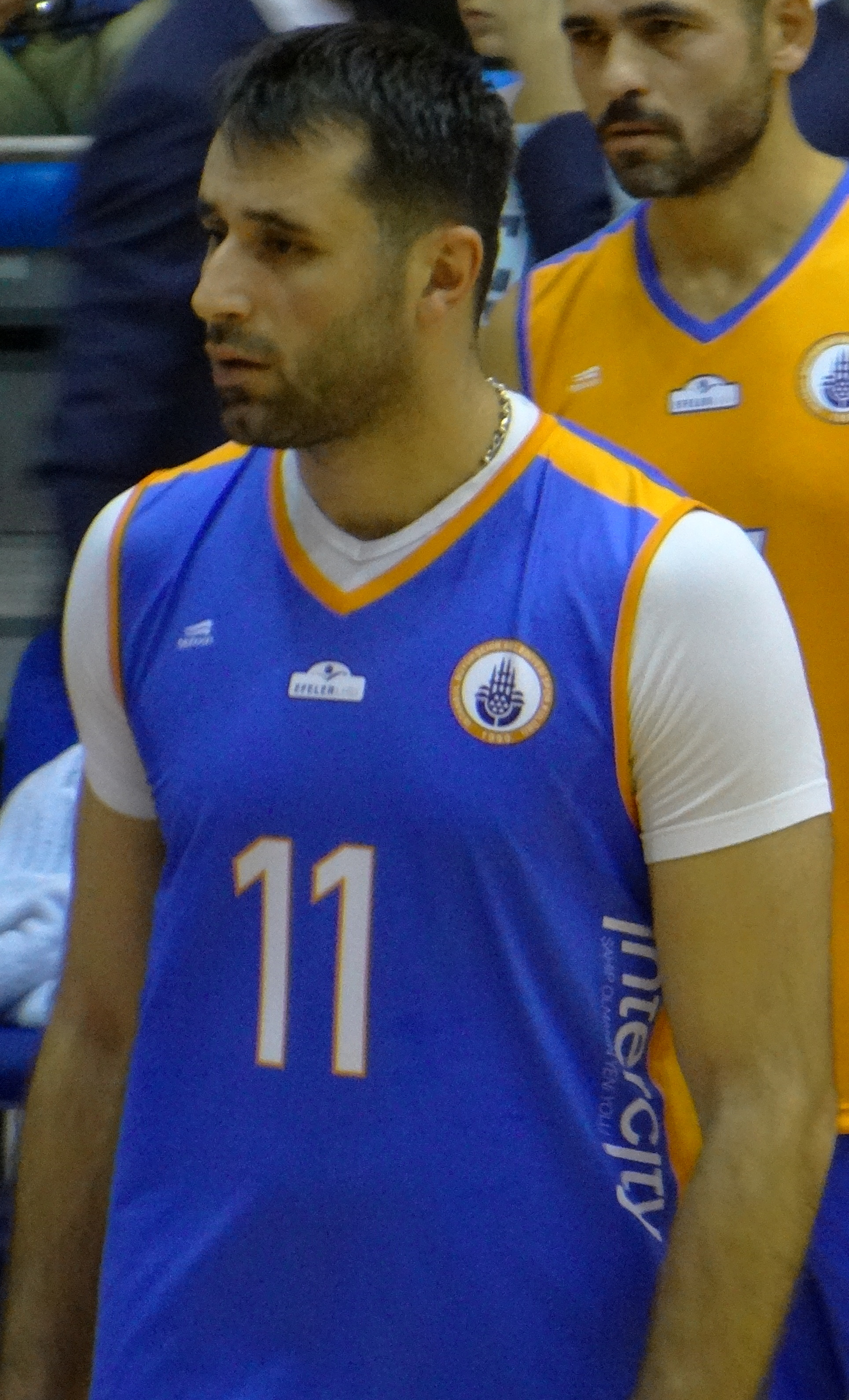

Personal information
- Full name: İbrahim Emet
- Born: January 15, 1986 (age 40) Alanya, Turkey
- Height: 2.10 m (6 ft 10 1/2 in)

Volleyball information
- Position: Middle Blocker
- Current club: Develi Belediyespor

Career
- Years: Team
- 2000-2008 2008-2010 2010-2012 2012-2013 2013-2016 2016-2017 2017-2019 2019-2020 2020-2021 2021-2022 2022-now: SGK; Galatasaray; Torul Gençlerbirligi; Maliye Milli Piyango; Galatasaray; Fenerbahçe Men's Volleyball; İstanbul BBSK; Halkbank; Spor Toto Spor Kulübü; Yeni Kızıltepe Spor Kulübü; Develi Belediyespor

National team
- Years: Team
- 2006-present: Turkey

İbrahim Emet (born January 15, 1986, in Ankara) is a Turkish volleyball player. Standing 210 cm, he has played for the Develi Belediyespor since the start of the 2022 season. He also played 120 times for national team.
