= Can Ayvazoğlu =

Turkish volleyball player (born 1979)

Personal information
- Full name: Can Ayvazoğlu
- Born: September 14, 1979 (age 47)
- Height: 1.90 m (6 ft 3 in)
- Weight: 89 kg (196 lb)
- Spike: 337 cm (133 in)
- Block: 320 cm (130 in)

Volleyball information
- Position: Libero

Career
Years
- 1998–2004
- 2004–2005
- 2005–2007
- 2007–2008
- 2009–2010
- 2010–2011
- 2011–2015
- 2015–2019
- 2019–2020
- 2020–
Teams
- Galatasaray
- Polis Akademisi
- Fenerbahçe
- Galatasaray
- SGK Ankara
- Ziraat Bankası
- Halkbank
- Galatasaray
- İnegöl Belediyesi
- Afyon Belediye Yüntaş

National team
Turkey

Can Ayvazoğlu (born September 14, 1979 in Germany) is a Turkish volleyball player. He is 190 cm and plays as out-side hitter. He studied at Marmara University.

== Career ==
He plays for Galatasaray Volleyball team since the 2007-08 season, and wear number 7. He played over 100 times for the national team. He also played for Izmir DSI, Polis Akademisi and Fenerbahçe Volleyball.
