= Kemal Kıvanç Elgaz =

Turkish volleyball player (born 1986)

Personal information
- Full name: Kemal Kıvanç Elgaz
- Born: January 1, 1986 (age 40); Turkey
- Height: 2.01 m (6 ft 7 in)
- Weight: 92 kg (203 lb)

Volleyball information
- Position: Opposite

Career
Years
- 2005–2013
- 2013–2016
- 2015–2017
- 2017–2018
- 2017–2018
- 2018–2019
- 2019–2020
Teams
- Galatasaray
- Şahinbey Belediye
- Global Connect Travel Düzce
- Jeopark Kula Voleybol
- Afyon Belediye Yüntaş
- İnegöl Belediyesi
- Galatasaray

National team
Turkey

Kemal Kıvanç Elgaz (born January 1, 1986, in Turkey) is a Turkish former volleyball player.
