= Yasin Sancak =

Turkish volleyball player (born 1979)

Personal information
- Full name: Yasin Sancak
- Born: September 9, 1978 (age 48) Istanbul, Turkey
- Height: 1.99 m (6 ft 6 1/2 in)

Volleyball information
- Position: Middle Blocker
- Current club: Galatasaray
- Number: 14

Career
- Years: Team
- 2009-present: Galatasaray

National team
- Years: Team
- 2000-present: Turkey
Honours
Men's volleyball
Representing Turkey
Universiade
Gold medal – first place	Izmir 2005	Team competition
Representing Fenerbahçe SK
Balkan Cup
Gold medal – first place	Thessaloniki 2009	Team competition

Yasin Sancak (born September 9, 1978) is a Turkish volleyball player. He is 199 cm and plays as middle blocker. He played 63 times for the national team and also played for Netaş, Erdemir, Arkas Spor, Galatasaray, Ziraat Bankası and Fenerbahçe. He is signed for Galatasaray.

== Honours and awards ==
- 4 times Turkish Men's Volleyball League Champion
- 1 time Turkish Cup Champion
- 2005 Summer Universiade Champion
- 2009 Balkan Cup Champion
