= Erhan Dünge =

Turkish volleyball player (born 1980)

Personal information
- Full name: Erhan Dünge
- Born: February 4, 1980 (age 46); Turkey
- Height: 2.08 m (6 ft 10 in)

Volleyball information
- Position: Middle Blocker
- Current club: (Turkey) Galatasaray
- Number: ?

Career
Years	Teams
2011-present	Galatasaray

Erhan Dünge (born February 4, 1980, in Turkey) is a Turkish volleyball player. He is 208 cm and plays as middle blocker. He plays for Galatasaray
