= Serdar Semerci =

Turkish volleyball player (born 1980)

Personal information
- Full name: Serdar Semerci
- Born: July 21, 1980 (age 46); Turkey
- Height: 1.94 m (6 ft 4 1/2 in)

Volleyball information
- Position: Outside hitter
- Current club: (Turkey) Galatasaray Yurtiçi Kargo
- Number: ?

Career
Years	Teams
2011-present	Galatasaray Yurtiçi Kargo

Serdar Semerci (born July 21, 1980, in Turkey) is a Turkish volleyball player. He is 194 cm and plays as outside hitter. He plays for Galatasaray Yurtiçi Kargo
