= Vahap Işık =

Turkish footballer

Personal information
- Date of birth: 28 December 1982 (age 43)
- Place of birth: Giresun, Turkey
- Height: 1.79 m (5 ft 10 in)
- Position: Centre back

Senior career*
Years	Team	Apps	(Gls)
2000–2001	Bulancakspor	9	(1)
2001–2002	Ünyespor	22	(0)
2002–2003	Gaskispor	28	(5)
2003–2006	Gaziantep B.B.	94	(4)
2007–2010	Antalyaspor	57	(5)
2010–2011	Giresunspor	5	(0)
2011–2012	Gaziantep B.B.	5	(0)
2012–2014	Kocaeli Birlik Spor	7	(1)
2015–2016	Bulancakspor	2	(0)
2016	Örnekspor		
- * Club domestic league appearances and goals

Vahap Işık (born 28 December 1982) is a Turkish former professional footballer who played as a centre back.
