= Ertuğrul Gazi Metin =

Turkish volleyball player (born 1996)

Personal information
- Full name: Ertuğrul Gazi Metin
- Born: 1 January 1996 (age 30); Antalya, Turkey
- Height: 2.03 m (6 ft 8 in)
- Weight: 85 kg (187 lb)
- Spike: 330 cm (130 in)
- Block: 320 cm (130 in)

Volleyball information
- Position: Middle Blocker
- Current club: Altekma
- Number: –

Career
Years
- 2016–2018
- 2018–2019
- 2018–2021
- 2021–
Teams
- Galatasaray
- Jeopark Kula Voleybol
- Galatasaray
- Altekma

National team
2017–	Turkey

Ertuğrul Gazi Metin (born 1 January 1996) is a Turkish male volleyball player. He is part of the Turkey men's national volleyball team. On club level he plays for Altekma.
