= Onur Çukur =

Turkish volleyball player (born 1999)

Personal information
- Nationality: Turkish
- Born: 9 August 1999 (age 27); Turkey
- Height: 2.03 m (6 ft 8 in)
- Weight: 92 kg (203 lb)
- Spike: 342 cm (135 in)

Volleyball information
- Position: Setter
- Current club: Galatasaray
- Number: 12

Career
Years
- 2011–2017
- 2015–2016
- 2017–2021
- 2021–2022
Teams
- Arkas Spor
- → TFL Altekma
- Grand Canyon University
- Galatasaray

National team
Turkey

Onur Çukur (born 9 August 1999) is a Turkish volleyball player for Galatasaray and the Turkish national team. He studied and played for 4 years at Grand Canyon University where he obtained a degree in psychology.

== Club career ==
On 13 August 2021, Galatasaray HDI Sigorta signed a one-year contract with young setter Çukur.
