= Ferhat Akdeniz =

Turkish volleyball player (born 1986)

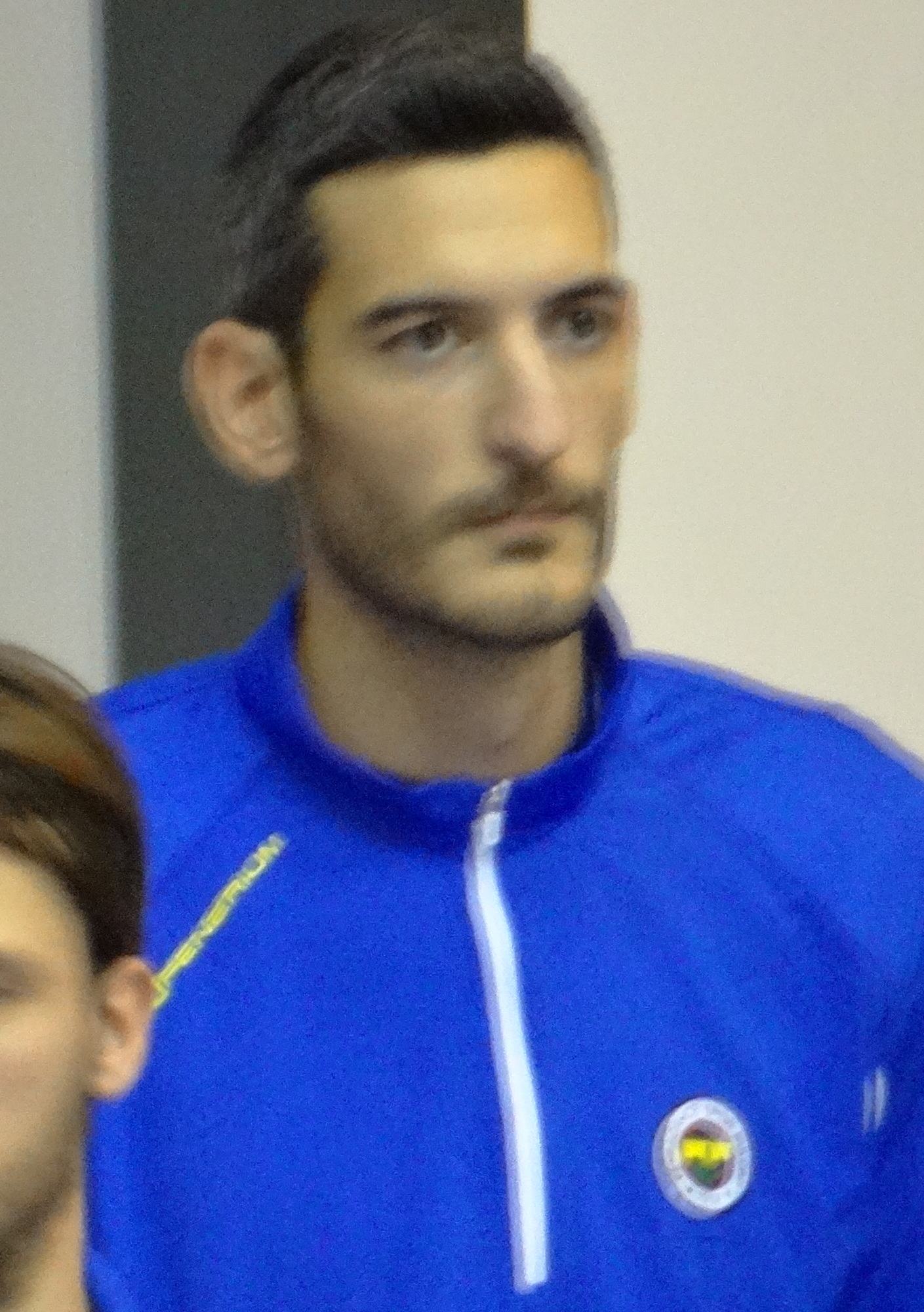

Personal information
- Born: October 26, 1986 (age 40); Switzerland
- Height: 2.03 m (6 ft 8 in)

Volleyball information
- Position: Middle Blocker
- Current club: (Turkey) Fenerbahçe S.K.
- Number: 16

Career
Years	Teams
2017-present	Fenerbahçe S.K.

Ferhat Akdeniz (born October 26, 1986, in Switzerland) is a Turkish volleyball player. He is 203 cm and plays as middle blocker. He plays for Fenerbahçe S.K.
