= Tolga Altıntaş =

Turkish volleyball player (born 1980)

Personal information
- Full name: Tolga Altıntaş
- Born: January 14, 1980 (age 46) Turkey
- Height: 1.96 m (6 ft 5 in)

Volleyball information
- Position: Outside hitter
- Current club: (Turkey) Galatasaray
- Number: ?

Career
- Years: Team
- 2011-present: Galatasaray

Tolga Altıntaş (born January 14, 1980, in Turkey) is a Turkish volleyball player. He is 196 cm and plays as outside hitter. He plays for Galatasaray
