= Burak Mert =

Turkish volleyball player (born 1990)

Personal information
- Full name: Burak Mert
- Born: 23 October 1990 (age 36); Turkey
- Height: 1.85 m (6 ft 1 in)
- Weight: 81 kg (179 lb)
- Spike: 315 cm (124 in)
- Block: 295 cm (116 in)

Volleyball information
- Position: Libero
- Current club: Fenerbahçe
- Number: –

Career
Years
- 2008–2017
- 2017–2019
- 2019–2021
- 2021–
Teams
- İstanbul BB
- Arkas Spor
- Galatasaray
- Fenerbahçe

National team
| 2014– | Turkey |
Honours
Men's volleyball
Representing Turkey
Islamic Solidarity Games
| Bronze medal – third place | 2021 Konya | Team |

Burak Mert (born 23 October 1990) is a Turkish male volleyball player. He is part of the Turkey men's national volleyball team. On club level he plays for Fenerbahçe.
