= Batuhan Avcı =

Turkish volleyball player (born 2000)

Personal information
- Full name: Batuhan Avcı
- Born: 2 August 2000 (age 26); Istanbul, Turkey
- Height: 2.03 m (6 ft 8 in)
- Weight: 89 kg (196 lb)
- Spike: 345 cm (136 in)
- Block: 330 cm (130 in)

Volleyball information
- Position: Outside hitter
- Current club: Arkas Spor

Career
Years
- 2016–2019
- 2019–2020
- 2020–2021
- 2021–
Teams
- Beşiktaş
- İstanbul Büyükşehir Belediyespor
- Galatasaray
- Arkas Spor

National team
2017–	Turkey

Batuhan Avcı (born 2 August 2000) is a Turkish volleyball player. He is part of the Turkey men's national volleyball team. On club level, he plays for Arkas Spor.

== Career ==
On August 13, 2020, Galatasaray signed a 2-year contract with young spiker Avcı.
