= Ali Peçen =

Turkish volleyball player (born 1969)

Ali Peçen (born 30 January 1969 in Istanbul) is a Turkish volleyball player. He is 192 cm and plays as libero. Since the start of the 2007 season, he has played for Fenerbahçe Men's Volleyball team and wears number 9. He is the team's vice-captain. He has also played for Eczacıbaşı, Halkbank, Netaş and Erdemir.

Peçen has represented the national team in over 180 games.

== Achievements ==
- Turkish League Champion : 1989–90, 1990–91
- Turkish League 2nd : 1986–87
- Turkish League 3rd : 1988–89
- Turkish League 4th : 1987–88,
- Turkish Cup Champion : 1989–90, 1990–91
- Turkish Presidents Cup Champion : 1990–91
