= Philippe Barca-Cysique =

French volleyball player (born 1977)

Personal information
- Full name: Philippe Barca-Cysique
- Born: April 22, 1977 (age 49); Paris, France
- Height: 1.94 m (6 ft 4 1/2 in)

Volleyball information
- Position: Outside hitter

Career
Years	Teams
1997–1998; 1998–1999; 1999–2001; 2001–2002; 2002–2004; 2004–2006; 2006–2009; 2009–2011; 2011–2012; 2013–2014; 2015-2018	Clamart Volley-Ball; Le Plessis-Robinson; Asnières Volley 92; AS Cannes; Nice Volley-Ball; AS Cannes; Tourcoing LM; Galatasaray; Paykan; Al Rayyan; Bruxelles Est Volley Club

National team
2001-2006	France
Honours
Men's Volleyball
Representing France
World Championships
Bronze medal – third place	Argentina 2002	Team competition
World League
Silver medal – second place	2006 Moscow	Team

Philippe Barca-Cysique (born April 22, 1977, in Paris) is a former French volleyball player who has played 103 games for the national team.

He started in the music video Outété of Keen' V.
