= Akif Gürgen =

Turkish volleyball player (born 1977)

Personal information
- Full name: Mehmet Akif Gürgen
- Born: September 23, 1957 (age 69); Turkey
- Height: 1.73 m (5 ft 8 in)

Volleyball information
- Position: Libero
- Current club: (Turkey) Galatasaray Yurtiçi Kargo
- Number: ?

Career
Years	Teams
2011-present	Galatasaray Yurtiçi Kargo

Akif Gürgen (born September 23, 1967) is a Turkish volleyball player. He is 193 cm and plays as a libero. He plays for Galatasaray Yurtiçi Kargo.
