= Doğukan Ulu =

Turkish volleyball player (born 1995)

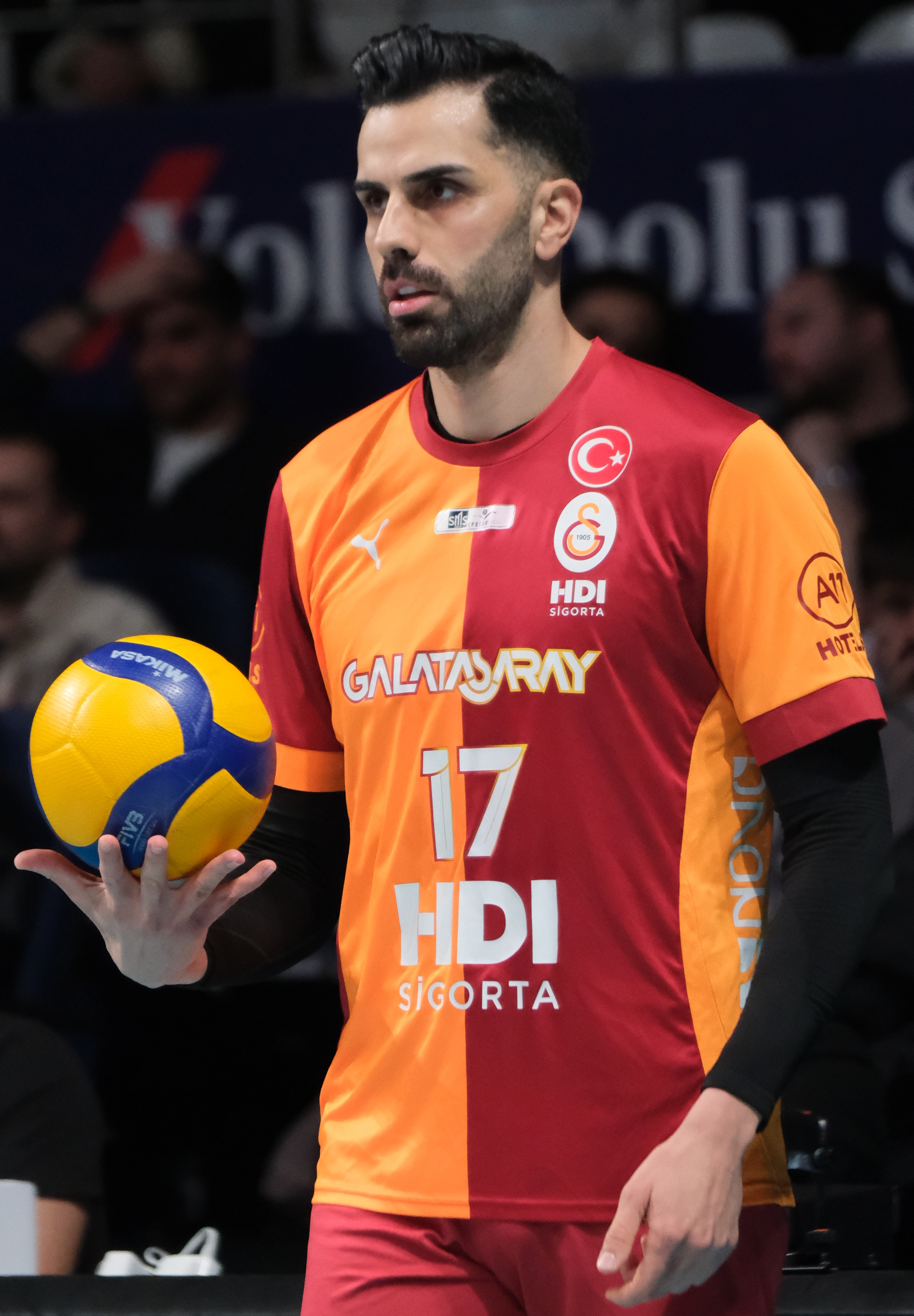

Personal information
- Full name: Doğukan Ulu
- Born: 30 October 1995 (age 31); Anamur, Mersin, Turkey
- Height: 2.01 m (6 ft 7 in)
- Weight: 83 kg (183 lb)
- Spike: 325 cm (128 in)
- Block: 318 cm (125 in)

Volleyball information
- Position: Middle Blocker
- Current club: Galatasaray
- Number: 17

Career
Years
- 2014–2016
- 2015–2016
- 2016–2022
- 2022–2024
- 2024–
Teams
- Galatasaray
- Bal Spor
- Galatasaray
- Halkbank
- Galatasaray

National team
2017–	Turkey

Doğukan Ulu (born 30 October 1995) is a Turkish male volleyball player.

He is part of the Turkey men's national volleyball team. On club level he plays for Galatasaray.

== Club career ==
On July 18, 2026, he signed a new one-year contract with Galatasaray.
