= Işık Menküer =

Turkish volleyball player and coach

Personal information
- Nationality: Turkish
- Born: 21 December 1964 (age 61); Antalya, Turkey

Coaching information
Previous teams coached
Years	Teams
1985–1986; 1997–1999; 1999–2002; 1998–2003; 2003; 2003–2006; 2006–2007; 2009–2012; 2016–2017	Mehmet Erdem Marmara Akademi; Turkey (Coach assistant); Turkey U19; Arçelik Istanbul; Turkey; Galatasaray; Turkey; Galatasaray; Beşiktaş

National team
Turkey

Işık Menküer (born 21 December 1964) is a Turkish volleyball coach. He has coached many teams including
