= Bursa Büyükşehir Belediyesi S.K. =

Bursa Büyükşehir Belediyesi Spor Kulübü
- Abbreviation: Bursa B.B. SK
- Formation: 1980
- Purpose: Sport: Athletics, basketball, chess, cue sports, cycling, gymnastics, karate, kayaking, sailing, scouting, shooting and hunting, swimming, table tennis, tennis, volleyball, water polo, wrestling
- Location: Bursa, Turkey
- President: Recep Altepe (City mayor)
- Director: Taha Başparmak
- Website: www.bursabbspor.com

Bursa Büyükşehir Belediyesi Spor Kulübü, also known as Bursa Büyükşehir Belediyespor or simply Bursa B.B. SK, is a Turkish multi-sport club sponsored by the Metropolitan Municipality of Bursa in Turkey.

Established in 1980 with five sports departments, Bursa Büyükşehir Belediye SK are currently active in 17 sports genres performed by around 5,000 licensed athletes. The club focuses on infrastructure.

The club has dedicated facilities available such as a table tennis hall, a wrestling hall as well as indoor and open-air tennis courts and swimming pools, which are also open to the public. Its Acemler Sports Hall hosts basketball, volleyball and karate events.

The women's basketball team plays in the Turkish Women's Basketball Second League and the women's volleyball team competes in the Turkish Women's Volleyball League.

The club's women's table tennis team consisting of Elena Dubkova (BLR), Sibel Ismail Remzi (TUR), Anamaria Sebe (ROM), Aylin Öztürk (TUR), Özge Şener (TUR) and Filiz Bozkurt (TUR) competed at the 2012-2013 Women's ETTU Cup. In the Group C, they won against USD Tennistavola Zeus from Italy (3-1), losing however to the Austrian TTC Carinthiawinds-Villacher (1-3) and Russian KFU Kazan (0-3) in the second round failing to advance to the third round.

== Table tennis ==
- Ece Haraç (born 2002)
