= Vahit Emre Savaş =

Turkish volleyball player (born 1995)

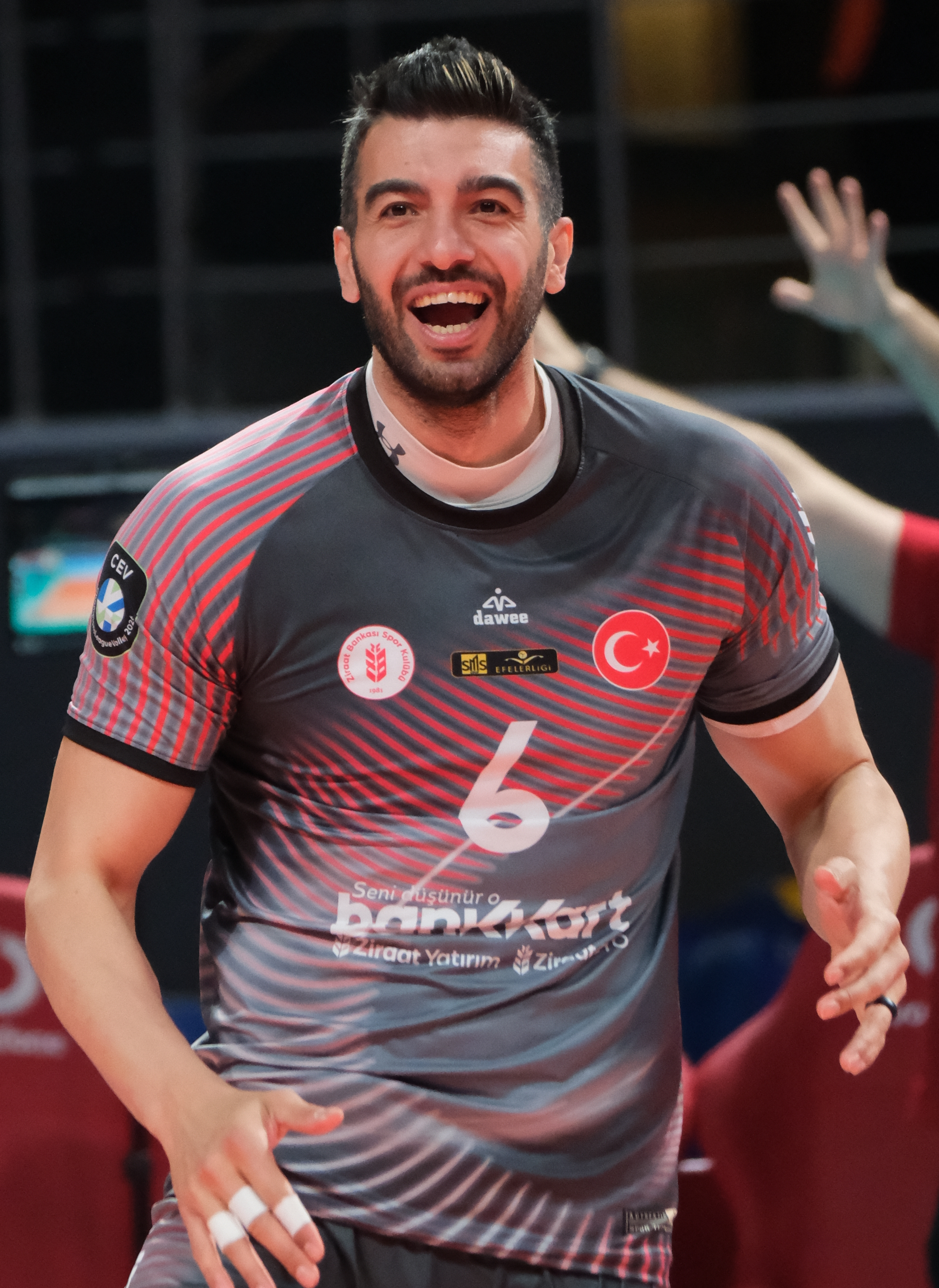

Personal information
- Full name: Vahit Emre Savaş
- Born: 7 March 1995 (age 31) Ankara, Turkey
- Height: 2.02 m (6 ft 7 1/2 in)
- Weight: 90 kg (200 lb)
- Spike: 335 cm (132 in)
- Block: 322 cm (127 in)

Volleyball information
- Position: Middle Blocker
- Current club: Galatasaray
- Number: 7

Career
- Years: Team
- 2013–2014; 2014–2019; 2019–2022: Çankaya Belediyesi Anka; Ziraat Bankası S.K.; Galatasaray

National team
- Years: Team
- 2014–: Turkey

Vahit Emre Savaş (born 7 March 1995) is a Turkish male volleyball player. He is part of the Turkey men's national volleyball team. On club level he plays for Galatasaray.
