= Umut Çakır =

Personal information
- Born: 31 March 1978 (age 48) Bursa, Turkey
- Height: 1.95 m (6 ft 5 in)

Coaching information
- Current team: Free agent
- Previous teams coached
- Years: Teams
- 2015–2022 2017 2022–2025 2023–2024 2025: Galatasaray (M) (AC); Turkey U23 (M); Galatasaray (M); Turkey (M) (AC); Turkey (M)

Volleyball information
- Position: Setter

Career
- Years: Team
- 1998–2005 2005–2007 2007–2009 2009–2010: Galatasaray; Fenerbahçe; Halkbank; İBB Spor Kulübü

National team
- Years: Team
- –: Turkey

Umut Çakır (born 31 March 1978) is a Turkish volleyball coach and former player.
