= Nedim Özbey =

Turkish volleyball coach (born 1955)

Personal information
- Nationality: Turkish
- Born: 28 February 1955 (age 71); Istanbul, Turkey

Volleyball information
- Position: Head coach

Career
Years
- 1989–2015
- 2015–2022
- 2018–2022
- 2022–
Teams
- İstanbul Büyükşehir Belediyespor
- Galatasaray
- Turkey
- Spor Toto

Nedim Özbey (born 28 February 1955) is a Turkish volleyball coach. He coached Turkish side Galatasaray from 2015 to 2022, and at the same time coached the national Turkish men's team from 2018 to 2022. Since his departure from both teams in 2022, he has coached at Spor Toto who play in Ankara.
