= Cansın Hacıbekiroğlu =

Turkish volleyball player (born 1987)

Personal information
- Full name: Cansın Hacıbekiroğlu
- Born: 12 July 1987 (age 39); Turkey
- Height: 2.02 m (6 ft 7 1/2 in)
- Weight: 92 kg (203 lb)
- Spike: 350 cm (140 in)
- Block: 340 cm (130 in)

Volleyball information
- Position: Middle Blocker
- Current club: Galatasaray
- Number: 13

Career
Years
- 2005–2006
- 2006–2007
- 2007–2010
- 2010–2013
- 2013–2014
- 2014–2019
- 2019–2020
- 2020–2021
- 2021–2022
Teams
- Çankaya Belediyesi Anka
- Spor Toto Spor Kulübü
- Polis Akademisi
- 4 Eylül Belediye Sivas
- Galatasaray
- İnegöl Belediyesi
- Bursa Büyükşehir Belediyespor
- Tokat Belediye Plevnespor
- Galatasaray

National team
Turkey

Cansın Hacıbekiroğlu (born 12 July 1987) is a Turkish male volleyball player. He is part of the Turkey men's national volleyball team. On club level he plays for Galatasaray.
