= Melih Sıratça =

Turkish volleyball player (born 1996)

Personal information
- Full name: Melih Sıratça
- Born: 18 February 1996 (age 30); Istanbul, Turkey
- Height: 1.95 m (6 ft 5 in)
- Weight: 90 kg (200 lb)
- Spike: 350 cm (140 in)
- Block: 340 cm (130 in)

Volleyball information
- Position: Outside hitter
- Current club: Arkas spor
- Number: 3

Career
Years
- 2013–2023
- 2023–2024
- 2024-2025
Teams
- Galatasaray
- Cizre Belediyespor
- Arkas Spor

National team
2017–	Turkey

Melih Sıratça (born 18 February 1996) is a Turkish volleyball player. He plays as outside hitter for the club Arkas Spor and the Turkey men's national volleyball team.
