= Muzaffer Yönet =

Turkish volleyball player (born 1997)

Personal information
- Full name: Muzaffer Yönet
- Born: 18 June 1997 (age 29); Turkey
- Height: 1.97 m (6 ft 5 1/2 in)
- Weight: 78 kg (172 lb)
- Spike: 340 cm (130 in)
- Block: 330 cm (130 in)

Volleyball information
- Position: Setter
- Current club: Free agent

Career
Years
- 2014–2018
- 2018–2020
- 2020–2021
- 2021–2022
- 2022–2023
- 2023–2025
Teams
- Arkas Spor
- Galatasaray
- Solhan Spor Kulübü
- Galatasaray
- Altekma Spor Kulübü
- Galatasaray

National team
Turkey

Muzaffer Yönet (born 18 June 1997) is a Turkish volleyball player. He plays for the club Galatasaray and the Turkey men's national volleyball team.

== Club career ==
On 16 August 2023, he signed a new 2-year contract with Galatasaray.

Galatasaray club said goodbye to the player on May 12, 2025, by publishing a thank you message.
