= Selim Kalaycı =

Turkish volleyball player (born 2000)

Personal information
- Full name: Selim Kalaycı
- Born: 12 February 2000 (age 26); Turkey
- Height: 2.10 m (6 ft 10 1/2 in)
- Weight: 105 kg (231 lb)
- Spike: 330 cm (130 in)
- Block: 321 cm (126 in)

Volleyball information
- Position: Opposite

Career
Years
- 2018–2025
- 2020–2021
- 2025–
Teams
- Galatasaray
- Bigadiç Belediyespor
- Gebze Belediyesi

National team
Turkey

Selim Kalaycı (born 12 February 2000) is a Turkish male volleyball player. He plays for the club Gebze Belediyesi and the Turkey men's national volleyball team.

== Club career ==
On 23 June 2023, he signed a new 1-year contract with Galatasaray.

Galatasaray club said goodbye to the player on May 12, 2025, by publishing a thank you message.
