= Onurcan Çakır =

Turkish volleyball player (born 1995)

Personal information
- Full name: Onurcan Çakır
- Born: 27 September 1995 (age 31); Turkey
- Height: 1.89 m (6 ft 2 1/2 in)
- Weight: 80 kg (180 lb)
- Spike: 320 cm (130 in)
- Block: 310 cm (120 in)

Volleyball information
- Position: Libero
- Current club: Arkas Spor

Career
Years
- 2013–2023
- 2023–
Teams
- Galatasaray
- Arkas Spor

National team
Turkey

Onurcan Çakır (born 27 September 1995) is a Turkish male volleyball player. He is part of the Turkey men's national volleyball team. On club level he plays for Arkas Spor.
