= Yasin Aydın =

Turkish volleyball player (born 1995)

Personal information
- Full name: Yasin Aydın
- Born: 11 July 1995 (age 31) Turkey
- Height: 1.94 m (6 ft 4 1/2 in)
- Weight: 79 kg (174 lb)
- Spike: 350 cm (140 in)
- Block: 335 cm (132 in)

Volleyball information
- Position: Outside hitter

Career
- Years: Team
- 2013–2023; 2023–2024; 2024–2025: Galatasaray; Develi Belediyespor; Fenerbahçe

National team
- Years: Team
- 2013–: Turkey

Yasin Aydın (born 11 July 1995) is a Turkish male volleyball player. On club level he last played for Fenerbahçe. .

== National team career ==
He is part of the Turkey men's national volleyball team. He won the bronze medal with the Turkish team at the 2013 Islamic Solidarity Games.
