= South Korea men's national volleyball team =

Men's national volleyball team representing South Korea

South Korea
- Association: Korea Volleyball Association (KVA)
- Confederation: AVC
- Head coach: Issanayê Ramires
- FIVB ranking: 26 (3 August 2026)

Uniforms
| Home | Away | Third |

Summer Olympics
- Appearances: 8 (First in 1964)
- Best result: 5th (1984)

World Championship
- Appearances: 11 (First in 1956)
- Best result: 4th (1978)

World Cup
- Appearances: 8 (First in 1977)
- Best result: 5th (1991)

Asian Championship
- Appearances: 23 (First in 1975)
- Best result: (1989, 1993, 2001, 2003)
- www.kva.or.kr (in Korean)
Honours
| Event | 1st | 2nd | 3rd |
|---|---|---|---|
| Challenger Cup | 0 | 0 | 1 |
| Asian Championship | 4 | 4 | 10 |
| Asian Games | 3 | 7 | 4 |
| AVC Cup | 0 | 1 | 2 |
| AVC Cup (2008–2022) | 1 | 1 | 0 |
| Eastern Asian Championship | 4 | 5 | 3 |
| Korea Cup | 1 | 0 | 0 |
| Universiade | 4 | 1 | 4 |
| Total | 17 | 19 | 24 |
Medal record
Challenger Cup
| Bronze medal – third place | 2022 Seoul | Team |
AVC Continental Championship
| Gold medal – first place | 1989 Seoul | Team |
| Gold medal – first place | 1993 Nakhon Ratchasima | Team |
| Gold medal – first place | 2001 Changwon | Team |
| Gold medal – first place | 2003 Tianjin | Team |
| Silver medal – second place | 1975 Melbourne | Team |
| Silver medal – second place | 1979 Manama | Team |
| Silver medal – second place | 1991 Perth | Team |
| Silver medal – second place | 2013 Dubai | Team |
| Bronze medal – third place | 1983 Tokyo | Team |
| Bronze medal – third place | 1987 Kuwait | Team |
| Bronze medal – third place | 1995 Seoul | Team |
| Bronze medal – third place | 1999 Tehran | Team |
| Bronze medal – third place | 2005 Suphanburi | Team |
| Bronze medal – third place | 2007 Jakarta | Team |
| Bronze medal – third place | 2009 Manila | Team |
| Bronze medal – third place | 2011 Tehran | Team |
| Bronze medal – third place | 2017 Gresik | Team |
| Bronze medal – third place | 2026 Kitakyushu | Team |
Asian Games
| Gold medal – first place | 1978 Bangkok | Team |
| Gold medal – first place | 2002 Busan | Team |
| Gold medal – first place | 2006 Doha | Team |
| Silver medal – second place | 1966 Bangkok | Team |
| Silver medal – second place | 1970 Bangkok | Team |
| Silver medal – second place | 1974 Tehran | Team |
| Silver medal – second place | 1986 Seoul | Team |
| Silver medal – second place | 1990 Beijing | Team |
| Silver medal – second place | 1998 Bangkok | Team |
| Silver medal – second place | 2018 Jakarta-Palembang | Team |
| Bronze medal – third place | 1982 New Delhi | Team |
| Bronze medal – third place | 1994 Hiroshima | Team |
| Bronze medal – third place | 2010 Guangzhou | Team |
| Bronze medal – third place | 2014 Incheon | Team |
AVC Cup
| Silver medal – second place | 2026 Ahmedabad | Team |
| Bronze medal – third place | 2023 Taipei | Team |
| Bronze medal – third place | 2024 Isa Town | Team |
AVC Cup (2008–2022)
| Gold medal – first place | 2014 Almaty | Team |
| Silver medal – second place | 2008 Nakhon Ratchasima | Team |
Eastern Asian Championship
| Gold medal – first place | 2008 Ulaanbaatar | Team |
| Gold medal – first place | 2010 Jeju | Team |
| Gold medal – first place | 2025 Zhangjiagang | Team |
| Gold medal – first place | 2026 Ulaanbaatar | Team |
| Silver medal – second place | 1998 Macau | Team |
| Silver medal – second place | 2000 Ulaanbaatar | Team |
| Silver medal – second place | 2002 Shanghai | Team |
| Silver medal – second place | 2004 Taicang | Team |
| Silver medal – second place | 2013 Taipei | Team |
| Bronze medal – third place | 2006 Pingtung | Team |
| Bronze medal – third place | 2015 Ulaanbaatar | Team |
| Bronze medal – third place | 2017 Ulaanbaatar | Team |
Korea Cup
| Gold medal – first place | 2024 Jecheon | Team |
Universiade
| Gold medal – first place | 1979 Mexico City | Team |
| Gold medal – first place | 1995 Fukuoka | Team |
| Gold medal – first place | 1997 Sicily | Team |
| Gold medal – first place | 2003 Daegu | Team |
| Silver medal – second place | 1967 Tokyo | Team |
| Bronze medal – third place | 1970 Turin | Team |
| Bronze medal – third place | 1973 Moscow | Team |
| Bronze medal – third place | 1977 Sofia | Team |
| Bronze medal – third place | 1993 Buffalo | Team |

The South Korea men's national volleyball team (Korean: 대한민국 남자 배구 국가대표팀; recognized as Korea by FIVB) represents South Korea in international volleyball competitions and friendly matches, governed by Korea Volleyball Association. The Republic of Korea (ROK) has competed in the Olympic Games eight times, but has not featured since the 2000 Olympic Games in Sydney, Australia. The national team's best performance at the Olympic Games was 5th place at the 1984 Games in Los Angeles, California, United States. The national team at the FIVB World Championship competed nine times, with their best result at 4th place in 1978. On continental level, The national team won three gold medals at the Asian Games in 1978, 2002 and 2006. And at the Asian Championship, the national team won four gold medals, two of these was at home in 1989 Seoul and 2001 Changwon and the other two are in 1993 and 2003. The national team now ranks 26th in the FIVB World Rankings.

== Competition record ==
=== Olympic Games ===
| Olympic Games record | | | | | | | | | Qualification record | | | | |
| Year | Round | Position | GP | MW | ML | SW | SL | Squad | GP | MW | ML | SW | SL |
|---|---|---|---|---|---|---|---|---|---|---|---|---|---|
| (Japan) 1964 | Round robin | 10th place | 9 | 0 | 9 | 9 | 27 | Squad | 6 | 6 | 0 | 18 | 4 |
| (Mexico) 1968 | Did not qualify | | | | | | | | Unknown asian qualifier | | | | |
| (West Germany) 1972 | 5th–8th places | 7th place | 7 | 3 | 4 | 10 | 13 | Squad | 2 | 2 | 0 | 6 | N/A |
| (Canada) 1976 | 5th–8th places | 6th place | 6 | 2 | 4 | 10 | 14 | Squad | 1975 Asian Championship | | | | |
| (Soviet Union) 1980 | Did not enter due to US-led boycott | | | | | | | | 6 | 3 | 3 | 10 | 12 |
| (United States) 1984 | 5th–8th places | 5th place | 6 | 5 | 1 | 15 | 8 | Squad | 5 | 2 | 3 | 10 | 9 |
| (South Korea) 1988 | 9th–12th places | 11th place | 7 | 2 | 5 | 10 | 17 | Squad | Qualified as host | | | | |
| (Spain) 1992 | 9th–10th places | 9th place | 6 | 2 | 4 | 6 | 13 | Squad | 1991 World Cup | | | | |
| (United States) 1996 | Preliminary round | 9th place | 5 | 1 | 4 | 3 | 12 | Squad | 6 | 5 | 1 | 15 | 7 |
| (Australia) 2000 | Preliminary round | 9th place | 5 | 1 | 4 | 8 | 14 | Squad | 3 | 3 | 0 | 9 | 1 |
| (Greece) 2004 | Did not qualify | | | | | | | | 7 | 1 | 6 | 5 | 18 |
| (China) 2008 | Did not qualify | | | | | | | | 7 | 4 | 3 | 14 | 13 |
| (United Kingdom) 2012 | Did not qualify | | | | | | | | 7 | 3 | 4 | 13 | 16 |
| (Brazil) 2016 | Did not qualify | | | | | | | | Did not qualify | | | | |
| (Japan) 2020 | Did not qualify | | | | | | | | 7 | 2 | 5 | 12 | 17 |
| (France) 2024 | Did not qualify | | | | | | | | Did not qualify | | | | |
| (United States) 2028 | Future events | | | | | | | | Future events | | | | |
| (Australia) 2032 | Future events | | | | | | | | Future events | | | | |
| Total | 8/16 | | 51 | 16 | 35 | 71 | 118 | — | 56 | 31 | 25 | 112 | 97 |

=== World Championship ===
Fourth place

World Championship record
| Year | Round | Position | GP | MW | ML | SW | SL | Squad |
|---|---|---|---|---|---|---|---|---|
| (Czechoslovakia) 1949 | Did not enter | | | | | | | |
| (Soviet Union) 1952 | Did not enter | | | | | | | |
| (France) 1956 | 11th–20th places | 18th place | 11 | 3 | 8 | 16 | 28 | Squad |
| (Brazil) 1960 | Did not enter | | | | | | | |
| (Soviet Union) 1962 | Did not enter | | | | | | | |
| (Czechoslovakia) 1966 | Did not qualify | | | | | | | |
| (Bulgaria) 1970 | Did not enter | | | | | | | |
| (Mexico) 1974 | 13th–18th places | 13th place | 11 | 9 | 2 | 27 | 8 | Squad |
| (Italy) 1978 | Semifinals | 4th place | 9 | 5 | 4 | 19 | 16 | Squad |
| (Argentina) 1982 | 5th–8th places | 8th place | 9 | 4 | 5 | 14 | 16 | Squad |
| (France) 1986 | Did not qualify | | | | | | | |
| (Brazil) 1990 | 13th–16th places | 14th place | 6 | 2 | 4 | 9 | 12 | Squad |
| (Greece) 1994 | Quarterfinals | 8th place | 7 | 2 | 5 | 10 | 18 | Squad |
| (Japan) 1998 | Second round | 13th place | 10 | 3 | 7 | 12 | 24 | Squad |
| (Argentina) 2002 | Qualified but later withdrew due to clash of dates with 2002 Asian Games | | | | | | | |
| (Japan) 2006 | First round | 17th place | 5 | 1 | 4 | 7 | 13 | Squad |
| (Italy) 2010 | Did not qualify | | | | | | | |
| (Poland) 2014 | First round | 17th place | 5 | 1 | 4 | 6 | 13 | Squad |
| (Italy) (Bulgaria) 2018 | Did not qualify | | | | | | | |
| (Poland) (Slovenia) 2022 | Did not qualify | | | | | | | |
| (Philippines) 2025 | Preliminary round | 27th place | 3 | 0 | 3 | 2 | 9 | Squad |
| (Poland) 2027 | Qualified | | | | | | | |
| (Qatar) 2029 | Future event | | | | | | | |
| Total | 10/21 | | 76 | 30 | 46 | 122 | 157 | — |

=== World Cup ===
World Cup record
| Year | Round | Position | GP | MW | ML | SW | SL | Squad |
|---|---|---|---|---|---|---|---|---|
| (Poland) 1965 | did not qualify | | | | | | | |
| (East Germany) 1969 | did not qualify | | | | | | | |
| (Japan) 1977 | 5th–8th places | 7th place | 8 | 2 | 6 | 9 | 18 | Squad |
| (Japan) 1981 | Did not qualify | | | | | | | |
| (Japan) 1985 | Round robin | 7th place | 7 | 2 | 5 | 8 | 17 | Squad |
| (Japan) 1989 | Round robin | 7th place | 7 | 2 | 5 | 8 | 17 | Squad |
| (Japan) 1991 | Final round | 5th place | 10 | 4 | 6 | 19 | 23 | Squad |
| (Japan) 1995 | Round robin | 8th place | 11 | 3 | 8 | 12 | 24 | Squad |
| (Japan) 1999 | Round robin | 7th place | 11 | 6 | 5 | 18 | 21 | Squad |
| (Japan) 2003 | Round robin | 6th place | 11 | 5 | 6 | 20 | 20 | Squad |
| (Japan) 2007 | Round robin | 11th place | 11 | 2 | 9 | 9 | 31 | Squad |
| (Japan) 2011 | Did not qualify | | | | | | | |
| (Japan) 2015 | Did not qualify | | | | | | | |
| (Japan) 2019 | Did not qualify | | | | | | | |
| (Japan) 2023 | Did not qualify | | | | | | | |
| Total | 8/15 | | 76 | 26 | 50 | 103 | 171 | — |

=== Nations League ===
Nations League record
| Year | Round | Position | GP | MW | ML | SW | SL | Squad |
|---|---|---|---|---|---|---|---|---|
| (France) 2018 | Relegated | 16th place | 15 | 1 | 14 | 11 | 42 | Squad |
| (United States) 2019 | Did not qualify | | | | | | | |
| (Italy) 2021 | Did not qualify | | | | | | | |
| (Italy) 2022 | Did not qualify | | | | | | | |
| (Poland) 2023 | Did not qualify | | | | | | | |
| (Poland) 2024 | Did not qualify | | | | | | | |
| (China) 2025 | Did not qualify | | | | | | | |
| (China) 2026 | Did not qualify | | | | | | | |
| Total | 1/8 | | 15 | 1 | 14 | 11 | 42 | — |

=== World Grand Champions Cup ===
Fourth place

World Grand Champions Cup record (Defunct)
| Year | Round | Position | GP | MW | ML | SW | SL | Squad |
|---|---|---|---|---|---|---|---|---|
| (Japan) 1993 | Round robin | 6th place | 5 | 0 | 5 | 3 | 15 | Squad |
| (Japan) 1997 | Did not qualify | | | | | | | |
| (Japan) 2001 | Round robin | 4th place | 5 | 2 | 3 | 7 | 10 | Squad |
| (Japan) 2005 | Did not qualify | | | | | | | |
| (Japan) 2009 | Did not qualify | | | | | | | |
| (Japan) 2013 | Did not qualify | | | | | | | |
| (Japan) 2017 | Did not qualify | | | | | | | |
| Total | 2/7 | | 10 | 2 | 8 | 10 | 25 | — |

=== World League ===
World League record (Defunct)
| Year | Round | Position | GP | MW | ML | SW | SL | Squad |
|---|---|---|---|---|---|---|---|---|
| (Japan) 1990 | did not enter | | | | | | | |
| (Italy) 1991 | Intercontinental round | 9th place | 16 | 4 | 12 | 19 | 38 | Squad |
| (Italy) 1992 | Intercontinental round | 8th place | 12 | 5 | 7 | 19 | 25 | Squad |
| (Brazil) 1993 | Intercontinental round | 10th place | 20 | 5 | 15 | 18 | 49 | Squad |
| (Italy) 1994 | Intercontinental round | 9th place | 12 | 2 | 10 | 17 | 30 | Squad |
| (Brazil) 1995 | Final round | 6th place | 16 | 6 | 10 | 23 | 36 | Squad |
| (Netherlands) 1996 | did not enter | | | | | | | |
| (Russia) 1997 | Intercontinental round | 11th place | 12 | 2 | 10 | 8 | 32 | Squad |
| (Italy) 1998 | Intercontinental round | 11th place | 12 | 2 | 10 | 12 | 30 | Squad |
| (Argentina) 1999 | did not enter | | | | | | | |
| (Netherlands) 2000 | did not enter | | | | | | | |
| (Poland) 2001 | did not enter | | | | | | | |
| (Brazil) 2002 | did not enter | | | | | | | |
| (Spain) 2003 | did not enter | | | | | | | |
| (Italy) 2004 | did not enter | | | | | | | |
| (Serbia and Montenegro) 2005 | did not enter | | | | | | | |
| (Russia) 2006 | Intercontinental round | 10th place | 12 | 4 | 8 | 15 | 28 | Squad |
| (Poland) 2007 | Intercontinental round | 9th place | 12 | 3 | 9 | 17 | 28 | Squad |
| (Brazil) 2008 | Intercontinental round | 13th place | 12 | 1 | 11 | 17 | 34 | Squad |
| (Serbia) 2009 | Intercontinental round | 14th place | 12 | 3 | 9 | 18 | 31 | Squad |
| (Argentina) 2010 | Intercontinental round | 16th place | 12 | 0 | 12 | 5 | 36 | Squad |
| (Poland) 2011 | Intercontinental round | 13th place | 12 | 3 | 9 | 14 | 29 | Squad |
| (Bulgaria) 2012 | Intercontinental round | 14th place | 12 | 1 | 11 | 16 | 35 | Squad |
| (Argentina) 2013 | Intercontinental round | 15th place | 10 | 4 | 6 | 16 | 22 | Squad |
| (Italy) 2014 | G2 Intercontinental round | 19th place | 12 | 3 | 9 | 20 | 29 | Squad |
| (Brazil) 2015 | G2 Intercontinental round | 18th place | 12 | 2 | 10 | 14 | 31 | Squad |
| (Poland) 2016 | G2 Intercontinental round | 23rd place | 9 | 2 | 7 | 14 | 22 | Squad |
| (Brazil) 2017 | G2 Intercontinental round | 18th place | 9 | 5 | 4 | 18 | 20 | Squad |
| Total | 19/28 | | 236 | 57 | 179 | 300 | 585 | — |

=== Challenger Cup ===
Third place

Challenger Cup record (Defunct)
| Year | Round | Position | GP | MW | ML | SW | SL | Squad |
|---|---|---|---|---|---|---|---|---|
| (Portugal) 2018 | Did not enter (Participated in Nations League) | | | | | | | |
| (Slovenia) 2019 | Did not enter | | | | | | | |
| (South Korea) 2022 | Semifinals | (bronze) 3rd place | 3 | 2 | 1 | 6 | 7 | Squad |
| (Qatar) 2023 | Did not qualify | | | | | | | |
| (China) 2024 | Did not qualify | | | | | | | |
| Total | 1/5 | | 3 | 2 | 1 | 6 | 7 | — |

=== AVC Continental Championship ===
Champions Runners up Third place Fourth place

AVC Continental Championship record
| Year | Round | Position | GP | MW | ML | SW | SL | Squad |
|---|---|---|---|---|---|---|---|---|
| (Australia) 1975 | Round Robin | (silver) Runners up | 6 | 5 | 1 | 16 | 5 | Squad |
| (Bahrain) 1979 | Round Robin | (silver) Runners up | 6 | 5 | 1 | 15 | 5 | Squad |
| (Japan) 1983 | Round Robin | (bronze) 3rd place | 8 | 6 | 2 | 21 | 9 | Squad |
| (Kuwait) 1987 | Semifinals | (bronze) 3rd place | 6 | 4 | 2 | 16 | N/A | Squad |
| (South Korea) 1989 | Final | (gold) Champions | 8 | 8 | 0 | 24 | 2 | Squad |
| (Australia) 1991 | Round Robin | (silver) Runners up | 7 | 6 | 1 | 20 | 5 | Squad |
| (Thailand) 1993 | Final | (gold) Champions | 7 | 6 | 1 | 19 | 4 | Squad |
| (South Korea) 1995 | Round Robin | (bronze) 3rd place | N/A | N/A | N/A | N/A | N/A | Squad |
| (Qatar) 1997 | Round Robin | 5th place | 5 | 3 | 2 | 9 | N/A | Squad |
| (Iran) 1999 | Round Robin | (bronze) 3rd place | 7 | 5 | 2 | 17 | 7 | Squad |
| (South Korea) 2001 | Final | (gold) Champions | 6 | 6 | 0 | 18 | 2 | Squad |
| (China) 2003 | Round Robin | (gold) Champions | 7 | 6 | 1 | 20 | 7 | Squad |
| (Thailand) 2005 | Semifinals | (bronze) 3rd place | 7 | 5 | 2 | 18 | 6 | Squad |
| (Indonesia) 2007 | Round Robin | (bronze) 3rd place | 5 | 3 | 2 | 13 | 8 | Squad |
| (Philippines) 2009 | Semifinals | (bronze) 3rd place | 8 | 6 | 2 | 20 | 10 | Squad |
| (Iran) 2011 | Semifinals | (bronze) 3rd place | 8 | 6 | 2 | 21 | 11 | Squad |
| (United Arab Emirates) 2013 | Final | (silver) Runners up | 7 | 5 | 2 | 16 | 8 | Squad |
| (Iran) 2015 | Quarterfinals | 7th place | 8 | 6 | 2 | 21 | 9 | Squad |
| (Indonesia) 2017 | Semifinals | (bronze) 3rd place | 8 | 7 | 1 | 23 | 7 | Squad |
| (Iran) 2019 | Semifinals | 4th place | 8 | 6 | 2 | 20 | 9 | Squad |
| (Japan) 2021 | Classification round | 8th place | 7 | 2 | 5 | 8 | 15 | Squad |
| (Iran) 2023 | Classification round | 5th place | 5 | 4 | 1 | 13 | 7 | Squad |
| (Japan) 2026 | Semifinals | (bronze) 3rd place | 6 | 4 | 2 | 14 | 10 | Squad |
| Total | 4 Titles | 23/23 | — | — | — | — | — | — |

=== Asian Games ===
Champions Runners up Third place

Asian Games record
| Year | Round | Position | GP | MW | ML | SW | SL | Squad |
|---|---|---|---|---|---|---|---|---|
| (Japan) 1958 | Did not enter | | | | | | | |
| (Indonesia) 1962 | Round robin | 5th place | 7 | 3 | 4 | 11 | 14 | Squad |
| (Thailand) 1966 | Round robin | Runners up | 8 | 7 | 1 | 21 | 4 | Squad |
| (Thailand) 1970 | Round robin | Runners up | 6 | 5 | 1 | N/A | N/A | Squad |
| (Iran) 1974 | Final | Runners up | 5 | 4 | 1 | 13 | 4 | Squad |
| (Thailand) 1978 | Round Robin | Champions | 8 | 6 | 2 | 23 | 6 | Squad |
| (India) 1982 | Round Robin | 3rd place | 5 | 3 | 2 | 12 | 6 | Squad |
| (South Korea) 1986 | Round Robin | Runners up | 8 | 7 | 1 | 22 | 3 | Squad |
| (China) 1990 | Final | Runners up | 5 | 4 | 1 | 13 | 3 | Squad |
| (Japan) 1994 | Semifinals | 3rd place | 4 | 3 | 1 | 9 | 3 | Squad |
| (Thailand) 1998 | Final | Runners up | 6 | 5 | 1 | 16 | 4 | Squad |
| (South Korea) 2002 | Final | Champions | 6 | 6 | 0 | 18 | 0 | Squad |
| (Qatar) 2006 | Final | Champions | 3 | 3 | 0 | 9 | 3 | Squad |
| (China) 2010 | Semifinals | 3rd place | 8 | 7 | 1 | 23 | 4 | Squad |
| (South Korea) 2014 | Semifinals | 3rd place | 8 | 6 | 2 | 20 | 8 | Squad |
| (Indonesia) 2018 | Final | Runners up | 6 | 5 | 1 | 15 | 7 | Squad |
| (China) 2022 | Classification round | 7th place | 6 | 4 | 2 | 14 | 10 | Squad |
| (Japan) 2026 | To be determined | | | | | | | |
| Total | 3 Titles | 16/17 | 99 | 78 | 21 | – | – | — |

=== AVC Cup ===
Runners up Third place Fourth place

AVC Cup record
| Year | Round | Position | GP | MW | ML | SW | SL | Squad |
|---|---|---|---|---|---|---|---|---|
| (Sri Lanka) 2018 | Did not enter | | | | | | | |
| (Kyrgyzstan) 2022 | Did not enter | | | | | | | |
| (Taiwan) 2023 | Semifinals | 3rd | 5 | 4 | 1 | 12 | 4 | Squad |
| (Bahrain) 2024 | Semifinals | 3rd | 5 | 4 | 1 | 13 | 8 | Squad |
| (Bahrain) 2025 | Semifinals | 4th | 5 | 3 | 2 | 11 | 7 | Squad |
| (India) 2026 | Final | 2nd | 6 | 4 | 2 | 14 | 10 | Squad |
| Total | 4/6 | | 21 | 15 | 6 | 50 | 29 | — |

=== AVC Cup for Men ===
Champions Runners up Fourth place

AVC Cup (2008–2022) record (Defunct)
| Year | Round | Position | GP | MW | ML | SW | SL | Squad |
|---|---|---|---|---|---|---|---|---|
| (Thailand) 2008 | Final | 2nd | 6 | 5 | 1 | 17 | 7 | Squad |
| (Iran) 2010 | Quarterfinals | 6th | 6 | 3 | 3 | 13 | 14 | Squad |
| (Vietnam) 2012 | Final round | 5th | 6 | 4 | 2 | 14 | 7 | Squad |
| (Kazakhstan) 2014 | Final | 1st | 6 | 6 | 0 | 18 | 3 | Squad |
| (Thailand) 2016 | Final round | 8th | 6 | 2 | 4 | 7 | 14 | Squad |
| (Chinese Taipei) 2018 | Quarterfinals | 8th | 6 | 2 | 4 | 8 | 14 | Squad |
| (Thailand) 2022 | Semifinals | 4th | 6 | 3 | 3 | 13 | 13 | Squad |
| Total | 1 Title | 7/7 | 42 | 25 | 17 | 90 | 72 | — |

=== East Asian Championship ===
Champions Runners up Third place Fourth place

East Asian Championship record
| Year | Round | Position | GP | MW | ML | SW | SL | Squad |
|---|---|---|---|---|---|---|---|---|
| (Macau) 1998 | Final | 2nd | | | | | | |
| (Mongolia) 2000 | Final | 2nd | | | | | | |
| (China) 2002 | Final | 2nd | | | | | | |
| (China) 2004 | Final | 2nd | | | | | | |
| (Taiwan) 2006 | Round robin | 3rd | | | | | | |
| (Mongolia) 2008 | Final | 1st | | | | | | |
| (South Korea) 2010 | Final | 1st | | | | | | |
| (Taiwan) 2013 | Final | 2nd | | | | | | |
| (Mongolia) 2015 | Semifinals | 3rd | | | | | | |
| (Mongolia) 2017 | Semifinals | 3rd | | | | | | |
| (China) 2019 | Round robin | 4th | 5 | 2 | 3 | 10 | 9 | Squad |
| (China) 2025 | Final | 1st | 4 | 4 | 0 | 12 | 4 | Squad |
| (Mongolia) 2026 | Final | 1st | 5 | 5 | 0 | 15 | 4 | Squad |
| Total | 3 Titles | 13/13 | | | | | | — |

== Results and fixtures ==
=== 2025 ===
==== 2025 Asian Nations Cup ====
| 17 June 2025; 16:30 (UTC+03:00) | South Korea | 3–0 | New Zealand | Isa Bin Rashed Hall, Manama, Bahrain |
| 17 June 2025; 16:30 (UTC+03:00) | (28–26, 25–13, 25–22); Report | | | Isa Bin Rashed Hall, Manama, Bahrain |

| 19 June 2025; 16:30 (UTC+03:00) | South Korea | 3–0 | Vietnam | Isa Bin Rashed Hall, Manama, Bahrain |
| 19 June 2025; 16:30 (UTC+03:00) | (25–22, 25–23, 25–12); Report | | | Isa Bin Rashed Hall, Manama, Bahrain |

| 21 June 2025; 11:30 (UTC+03:00) | Australia | 1–3 | South Korea | Isa Bin Rashed Hall, Manama, Bahrain |
| 21 June 2025; 11:30 (UTC+03:00) | (23–25, 18–25, 25–22, 23–25); Report | | | Isa Bin Rashed Hall, Manama, Bahrain |

| 23 June 2025; 19:00 (UTC+03:00) | Bahrain | 3–2 | South Korea | Isa Bin Rashed Hall, Manama, Bahrain |
| 23 June 2025; 19:00 (UTC+03:00) | (25–21, 25–23, 21–25, 18–25, 15–13); Report | | | Isa Bin Rashed Hall, Manama, Bahrain |

| 24 June 2025; 15:00 (UTC+03:00) | South Korea | 0–3 | Qatar | Isa Bin Rashed Hall, Manama, Bahrain |
| 24 June 2025; 15:00 (UTC+03:00) | (21–25, 20–25, 23–25); Report | | | Isa Bin Rashed Hall, Manama, Bahrain |

==== 2025 East Asian Championship ====
| 19 August 2025; 14:30 (UTC+08:00) | South Korea | 3–0 | Mongolia | Zhangjiagang Sports Center, Zhangjiagang, China |
| 19 August 2025; 14:30 (UTC+08:00) | (25–23, 26–24, 25–20); Report | | | Zhangjiagang Sports Center, Zhangjiagang, China |

| 20 August 2025; 14:30 (UTC+08:00) | Chinese Taipei | 2–3 | South Korea | Zhangjiagang Sports Center, Zhangjiagang, China |
| 20 August 2025; 14:30 (UTC+08:00) | (25–19, 19–25, 23–25, 26–24, 13–15); Report | | | Zhangjiagang Sports Center, Zhangjiagang, China |

| 22 August 2025; 15:00 (UTC+08:00) | South Korea | 3–1 | Hong Kong | Zhangjiagang Sports Center, Zhangjiagang, China |
| 22 August 2025; 15:00 (UTC+08:00) | (25–15, 25–20 21–25, 25–14); Report | | | Zhangjiagang Sports Center, Zhangjiagang, China |

| 23 August 2025; 18:30 (UTC+08:00) | South Korea | 3–0 | Chinese Taipei | Zhangjiagang Sports Center, Zhangjiagang, China |
| 23 August 2025; 18:30 (UTC+08:00) | (25–22, 25–22, 25–16); Report | | | Zhangjiagang Sports Center, Zhangjiagang, China |

==== 2025 World Championship ====
| 14 September 2025; 18:00 (UTC+08:00) | France | 3–0 | South Korea | Araneta Coliseum, Quezon City, Philippines; Attendance: 1,050; Referees: Prater Michelle (USA), Luo Wensheng (CHN) |
| 14 September 2025; 18:00 (UTC+08:00) | (25–12, 25–18, 25–16); Report | | | Araneta Coliseum, Quezon City, Philippines; Attendance: 1,050; Referees: Prater Michelle (USA), Luo Wensheng (CHN) |

| 16 September 2025; 10:30 (UTC+08:00) | Argentina | 3–1 | South Korea | Araneta Coliseum, Quezon City, Philippines; Attendance: 502; Referees: Macias Luis Gerardo (MEX), Ramirez Ortiz Yuri R. (DOM) |
| 16 September 2025; 10:30 (UTC+08:00) | (25–22, 23–25, 25–21, 25–18); Report | | | Araneta Coliseum, Quezon City, Philippines; Attendance: 502; Referees: Macias Luis Gerardo (MEX), Ramirez Ortiz Yuri R. (DOM) |

| 18 September 2025; 10:30 (UTC+08:00) | Finland | 3–1 | South Korea | Araneta Coliseum, Quezon City, Philippines; Attendance: 512; Referees: Alblooshi Ismail Ibrahim (UAE), Prater Michelle (USA) |
| 18 September 2025; 10:30 (UTC+08:00) | (25–18, 25–23, 17–25, 25–21); Report | | | Araneta Coliseum, Quezon City, Philippines; Attendance: 512; Referees: Alblooshi Ismail Ibrahim (UAE), Prater Michelle (USA) |

== Team ==
=== Current squad ===
The following is the South Korean 14–man lineup for the 2026 AVC Men's Volleyball Continental Championship.

Head coach: (Brazil) Issanayê Ramires

| No. | Name | Date of birth | Pos. | Height | Weight | Spike | Block | 2026–27 club |
|---|---|---|---|---|---|---|---|---|
| 1 | Cha Young-seok | 17 April 1994 (age 32) | MB | 1.93 m (6 ft 4 in) | 90 kg (200 lb) | 335 cm (132 in) | 315 cm (124 in) | (South Korea) Uijeongbu KB Insurance Stars |
| 3 | Hwang Seung-bin | 26 August 1992 (age 34) | S | 1.81 m (5 ft 11 in) | 86 kg (190 lb) | 310 cm (120 in) | 300 cm (120 in) | (South Korea) Cheonan Hyundai Capital Skywalkers |
| 5 | Park Kyeong-min | 5 June 1999 (age 27) | L | 1.70 m (5 ft 7 in) | 65 kg (143 lb) | 270 cm (110 in) | 260 cm (100 in) | (South Korea) Cheonan Hyundai Capital Skywalkers |
| 6 | Kim Yeong-jun | 18 October 2000 (age 25) | L | 1.74 m (5 ft 9 in) | 68 kg (150 lb) | 270 cm (110 in) | 260 cm (100 in) | (South Korea) Seoul Woori Card Woori Won |
| 7 | Heo Su-bong | 7 April 1998 (age 28) | OH | 1.97 m (6 ft 6 in) | 93 kg (205 lb) | 320 cm (130 in) | 310 cm (120 in) | (South Korea) Cheonan Hyundai Capital Skywalkers |
| 8 | Han Tae-jun | 5 April 2004 (age 22) | S | 1.82 m (6 ft 0 in) | 77 kg (170 lb) | 310 cm (120 in) | 310 cm (120 in) | (South Korea) Seoul Woori Card Woori Won |
| 9 | Lim Sung-jin | 11 January 1999 (age 27) | OH | 1.95 m (6 ft 5 in) | 85 kg (187 lb) | 300 cm (120 in) | 290 cm (110 in) | (South Korea) Korea Armed Forces Athletic Corps |
| 12 | Park Chang-seong | 21 September 1998 (age 27) | MB | 2.00 m (6 ft 7 in) | 90 kg (200 lb) | 320 cm (130 in) | 298 cm (117 in) | (South Korea) Busan OK Financial Group Okman |
| 14 | Bang Kang-ho | 26 June 2007 (age 19) | OH | 1.99 m (6 ft 6 in) | 78 kg (172 lb) | | | (South Korea) Suwon KEPCO Vixtorm |
| 16 | Jeong Han-yong | 31 July 2001 (age 25) | OH | 1.94 m (6 ft 4 in) | 92 kg (203 lb) | 310 cm (120 in) | 295 cm (116 in) | (South Korea) Incheon Korean Air Jumbos |
| 17 | Im Dong-hyeok | 9 March 1999 (age 27) | OP | 2.00 m (6 ft 7 in) | 86 kg (190 lb) | 340 cm (130 in) | 330 cm (130 in) | (South Korea) Incheon Korean Air Jumbos |
| 18 | Choi Jun-hyeok | 25 March 2004 (age 22) | MB | 2.05 m (6 ft 9 in) | 95 kg (209 lb) | 340 cm (130 in) | 340 cm (130 in) | (South Korea) Incheon Korean Air Jumbos |
| 20 | Lee Sang-hyeon | 7 April 1999 (age 27) | MB | 2.00 m (6 ft 7 in) | 96 kg (212 lb) | | | (South Korea) Korea Armed Forces Athletic Corps |
| 88 | Lim Jae-young | 29 March 1998 (age 28) | OH | 1.90 m (6 ft 3 in) | 81 kg (179 lb) | | | (South Korea) Incheon Korean Air Jumbos |

=== Coach history ===
- (South Korea) Park Ki-won (2014)
- (South Korea) Moon Yong-kwan (2015)
- (South Korea) Kim Nam-sung (2016)
- (South Korea) Kim Ho-chul (2017–2018)
- (South Korea) Park Sam-ryong (2021)
- (South Korea) Im Do-heon (2019, 2022–2023)
- (Brazil) Issanayê Ramires (2024–)

=== Former squads ===
Volleyball at the Summer Olympics – Men's qualification

- Volleyball at the 2020 Summer Olympics – Men's Asian qualification — 3rd place

Hwang Taek-eui, Han Sun-soo, Na Gyeong-bok, Jeong Min-su, Lee Sang-uk, Heo Su-bong, Kwak Seung-suk, Jung Ji-seok, Choi Min-ho, Jeon Kwang-in, Park Chul-woo, Kim Kyu-min, Shin Yung-suk (c), Kim Jae-hwi. Head coach: Im Do-heon.

World Cup

- 2003 World Cup — 6th place

Ko Hee-jin, Chang Kwang-kyun, Yeo Oh-hyun, Choi Tae-woong (c), Shin Sun-ho, Lee Sun-kyu, Yoon Kwan-yeol, Kim Young-rae, Suk Jin-wook, Lee Hyung-doo, Shin Young-soo and Chang Byung-chul. Head coach: Cha Joo-hyun.

Challenger Cup

- 2022 FIVB Volleyball Men's Challenger Cup — (bronze) 3rd place

Im Dong-hyeok, Han Sun-soo (c), Hwang Kyung-min, Jeong Min-su, Park Kyeong-min, Hwang Taek-eui, Park Jin-woo, Kim Kyu-min, Kwak Seung-suk, Na Gyeong-bok, Choi Min-ho, Lim Sung-jin, Heo Su-bong, Shin Yung-suk. Head coach: Im Do-heon.

Asian Championship

- 2001 Asian Men's Volleyball Championship — (gold) Champions

Choi Tae-woong, Kim Kyung-hoon, Kim Sang-woo, Shin Sun-ho, Bang Shin-bong, Kim Se-jin, Chang Byung-chul, Shin Jin-sik, Lee Kyung-soo, Suk Jin-wook, Yoon Kwan-yeol, Lee Ho. Head coach: Shin Chi-yong.

- 2003 Asian Men's Volleyball Championship — (gold) Champions

Choi Tae-woong, Kwon Young-min, Shin Sun-ho, Lee Sun-kyu, Park Jae-han, Son Seok-beom, Shin Young-soo, Lee Kyung-soo, Suk Jin-wook, Gu Sang-yoon, Lee Hyung-Doo, Yeo Oh-hyun. Head coach: Cha Joo-hyun.

- 2005 Asian Men's Volleyball Championship — (bronze) 3rd place

Jang Young-gi, Song In-seok, Park Chul-woo, Kwon Young-min, Yeo Oh-hyun, Kim Sang-gi, Shin Sun-ho, Ha Hyun-yong, Lee Kyung-soo, Lee Hyung-doo, Lee Sun-kyu, Chang Byung-chul. Head coach: Gong Jeong-bae.

- 2007 Asian Men's Volleyball Championship — 3rd place

Kwon Young-min, You Kwang-woo, Ha Hyun-yong, Yun Bong-woo, Lee Sun-kyu, Moon Sung-min, Yang Sung-man, Lee Kyung-soo, Song In-seok, Park Joon-bum, Yeo Oh-hyun, Choi Bu-sik. Head coach: Yoo Joong-tak.

- 2009 Asian Men's Volleyball Championship — (bronze) 3rd place

Han Sun-soo, Hwang Dong-il, Yun Bong-woo, Lee Sun-kyu, Ha Kyung-min, Kim Yo-han, Kang Dong-jin, Lim Si-hyoung, Park Joon-bum, Choi Hong-suk, Yeo Oh-hyun, Lee Kang-joo. Head coach: Cha Sang-hyun.

- 2011 Asian Men's Volleyball Championship — (bronze) 3rd place

Han Sun-soo, Kwon Young-min, Shin Yung-suk, Lee Sun-kyu, Ha Kyung-min, Kim Yo-han, Kang Dong-jin, Lee Kyung-soo, Jeon Kwang-in, Choi Hong-suk, Yeo Oh-hyun, Lee Kang-joo. Head coach: Park Ki-won.

- 2013 Asian Men's Volleyball Championship — (silver) Runners-up

Han Sun-soo, Park Sang-ha, Jin Sang-heon, Ha Kyung-min, Kim Jeong-hwan, Shim Kyung-seop, Kwak Seung-suk, Jeon Kwang-in, Song Myung-geun, Ahn Joon-chan, Bu Yong-chan, Oh Jae-seong. Head coach: Park Ki-won.

- 2015 Asian Men's Volleyball Championship — 7th place

Kwon Young-min, Lee Min-gyu, Moon Sung-min, Seo Jae-duck, Song Hee-chae, Choi Hong-suk, Kwak Seung-suk, Choi Min-ho, Shin Yung-suk, Ji Tae-hwan, Jeong Min-su, Oh Jae-seong. Head coach: Moon Yong-kwan.

- 2017 Asian Men's Volleyball Championship — 3rd place

Lee Min-gyu, No Jae-wook, Moon Sung-min, Jung Ji-seok, Song Hee-chae, Park Joo-hyeong, Lee Si-woo, Choi Hong-suk, Lee Kang-won, Kim Jae-hwi, Shin Yung-suk, Jin Sang-heon, Bu Yong-chan, Oh Jae-seong. Head coach: Moon Yong-kwan.

- 2019 Asian Men's Volleyball Championship — 4th place

Hwang Taek-eui, Na Gyeong-bok, Jeong Min-su, Lee Sang-uk, Heo Su-bong, Kwak Seung-suk, Jung Ji-seok, Choi Min-ho, Jin Seong-tae, Jo Jae-sung, Im Dong-hyeok, Kwak Myoung-woo, Shin Yung-suk, Kim Jae-hwi. Head coach: Im Do-heon.

- 2026 AVC Men's Volleyball Continental Championship — 3rd place

Cha Young-seok, Hwang Seung-bin, Park Kyeong-min, Kim Yeong-jun, Heo Su-bong, Han Tae-jun, Lim Sung-jin, Park Chang-seong, Bang Kang-ho, Jeong Han-yong, Im Dong-hyeok, Choi Jun-hyeok, Lee Sang-hyeon, Lim Jae-young. Head coach: Issanayê Ramires.

Asian Games

- 2010 Asian Games — (bronze) 3rd place

Shin Young-soo, Han Sun-soo, Kwon Young-min, Moon Sung-min, Yeo Oh-hyun, Kim Hak-min, Kim Yo-han, Ko Hee-jin, Park Chul-woo, Suk Jin-wook (c), Ha Hyun-yong and Shin Yung-suk. Head coach: Shin Chi-yong.

- 2014 Asian Games — (bronze) 3rd place

Song Myung-geun, Han Sun-soo (c), Shin Yung-suk, Lee Min-gyu, Park Sang-ha, Kwak Seung-suk, Bu Yong-chan, Choi Min-ho, Jeon Kwang-in, Park Chul-woo, Seo Jae-duck and Jeong Min-su. Head coach: Park Ki-won.

Asian Cup

- 2008 Asian Men's Volleyball Cup — (silver) Runners-up

Chang Kwang-kyun, Park Chul-woo, Moon Sung-min, Yeo Oh-hyun, Choi Tae-woong, Lee Sun-kyu, Ha Hyun-yong, Shin Young-soo, Ko Hee-jin, Kim Yo-han, Hwang Dong-il, Shin Yung-suk. Head coach: Shin Chi-yong.

- 2010 Asian Men's Volleyball Cup — 6th place

Shin Young-soo, Han Sun-soo, Yeo Oh-hyun, Choi Tae-woong, Lee Sun-kyu, Kim Hak-min, Suk Jin-wook, Ko Hee-jin, Choi Hong-suk, Park Jun-bum, Ha Kyoung-mim, Lee Kang-joo. Head coach: Shin Chi-yong.

- 2012 Asian Men's Volleyball Cup — 5th place

Jeon Kwang-in, Park Jin-woo, Lee Min-gyu, Oh Jae-seong, Lee Kang-won, Son Hyun-jong, Song Hee-chae, Jin Seong-tae, Hwang Dong-il, Gu Do-hyeon, Sim Kyoung-sub, Song Myung-geun. Head coach: Park Ki-won.

- 2014 Asian Men's Volleyball Cup — (gold) Champions

Song Myung-geun, Han Sun-soo, Shin Yung-suk, Lee Min-gyu, Park Sang-ha, Kwak Seung-suk, Bu Yong-chan, Choi Min-ho, Jeon Kwang-in, Park Chul-woo, Seo Jae-duck, Jeong Min-su. Head coach: Park Ki-won.

- 2016 Asian Men's Volleyball Cup — 8th place

Lee Sang-uk, Cha Ji-hwan, Son Ju-hyeong, Lee Seung-won, Han Sung-jeong, Kim In-hyeok, Hwang Kyung-min, Jo Jae-sung, Hwang Taek-eui, Im Dong-hyeok, Jung Jun-heuk, Kim Jae-hwi. Head coach: Kim Nam-sung.

- 2018 Asian Men's Volleyball Cup — 8th place

Kwak Myoung-woo, Gim Myeong-gwan, Heo Su-bong, Han Sung-jeong, Park Joo-hyeong, Hong Sang-hyeok, Jeong Seong-gyu, Lee Jeong-jun, Jeon Jin-seon, Lee Sang-hyeon, Han Kuk-min, Jung Sung-min. Head coach: Park Hee-sang.

Asian Challenge Cup

- 2023 Asian Men's Volleyball Challenge Cup — (bronze) 3rd Place

Hwang Taek-eui, Gim Myeong-gwan, Park Kyeong-min, Oh Jae-seong, Heo Su-bong, Jung Ji-seok, Lim Sung-jin, Kim Min-jae, Hwang Kyung-min, Jeong Han-yong, Im Dong-hyeok, Jo Jae-young, Lee Sang-hyeon, Park Jun-hyeok. Head coach: Im Do-heon.

- 2024 Asian Men's Volleyball Challenge Cup — (bronze) 3rd Place

Lee Woo-jin, Hwang Taek-eui, Park Kyeong-min, Kim Young-jun, Cha ji-hwan, Lim Sung-jin, Cha Young-seok, Kim Joon-woo, Han Tae-jun, Jeong Han-yong, Choi Jun-hyeok, Lee Sang-hyeon, Shin Ho-jin, Kim Ji-han. Head coach: Issanayê Ramires.

== Kit providers ==
The table below shows the history of kit providers for the South Korea national volleyball team.

| Period | Kit provider |
|---|---|
| 2000–2021 | Asics |
| 2022–2026 | Puma |
| 2026– | MoveSport |

=== Sponsorship ===
Primary sponsors include: main sponsors like MoveSport.

== Head-to-head record ==
This page shows South Korea men's national volleyball team's Head-to-head record at the Volleyball at the Summer Olympics, FIVB Men's Volleyball World Championship, FIVB Men's Volleyball Nations League, FIVB Men's Volleyball Challenger Cup, AVC Men's Challenge Cup, Men's Asian Volleyball Cup.

| Opponent | GP | MW | ML | SW | SL |
|---|---|---|---|---|---|
| Algeria | 1 | 1 | 0 | 3 | 0 |
| Argentina | 6 | 2 | 4 | 9 | 15 |
| Australia | 9 | 6 | 3 | 21 | 16 |
| Austria | 1 | 1 | 0 | 3 | 0 |
| Bahrain | 3 | 1 | 2 | 3 | 8 |
| Belgium | 1 | 1 | 0 | 3 | 2 |
| Brazil | 11 | 4 | 7 | 15 | 26 |
| Bulgaria | 7 | 1 | 6 | 8 | 19 |
| Cameroon | 1 | 1 | 0 | 3 | 0 |
| Canada | 6 | 4 | 2 | 13 | 8 |
| China | 8 | 5 | 3 | 17 | 13 |
| Chinese Taipei | 1 | 0 | 1 | 0 | 3 |
| Cuba | 8 | 0 | 8 | 8 | 24 |
| Czech Republic | 1 | 1 | 0 | 3 | 2 |
| Czechoslovakia | 7 | 1 | 6 | 7 | 20 |
| East Germany | 2 | 1 | 1 | 3 | 3 |
| Egypt | 3 | 3 | 0 | 9 | 0 |
| Finland | 2 | 1 | 1 | 3 | 4 |
| France | 3 | 2 | 1 | 6 | 3 |
| Germany | 2 | 0 | 2 | 0 | 6 |
| Greece | 1 | 0 | 1 | 1 | 3 |
| Hong Kong | 1 | 1 | 0 | 3 | 0 |
| Hungary | 1 | 0 | 1 | 2 | 3 |
| India | 4 | 2 | 2 | 10 | 7 |
| Indonesia | 2 | 2 | 0 | 6 | 0 |
| Iran | 4 | 1 | 3 | 6 | 10 |
| Israel | 1 | 0 | 1 | 2 | 3 |
| Italy | 6 | 1 | 5 | 5 | 15 |
| Japan | 14 | 7 | 7 | 26 | 33 |
| Kazakhstan | 7 | 4 | 3 | 14 | 11 |
| Mexico | 1 | 1 | 0 | 3 | 0 |
| Mongolia | 1 | 1 | 0 | 3 | 0 |
| Myanmar | 2 | 2 | 0 | 6 | 1 |
| Netherlands | 5 | 0 | 5 | 4 | 15 |
| Pakistan | 1 | 0 | 1 | 1 | 3 |
| Panama | 1 | 1 | 0 | 3 | 0 |
| Poland | 4 | 2 | 2 | 8 | 8 |
| Portugal | 1 | 0 | 1 | 1 | 3 |
| Puerto Rico | 1 | 1 | 0 | 3 | 0 |
| Qatar | 2 | 1 | 1 | 3 | 5 |
| Romania | 4 | 1 | 3 | 5 | 10 |
| Russia | 5 | 0 | 5 | 2 | 15 |
| Saudi Arabia | 1 | 1 | 0 | 3 | 0 |
| Serbia | 1 | 0 | 1 | 0 | 3 |
| Serbia and Montenegro | 3 | 0 | 3 | 3 | 9 |
| Soviet Union | 6 | 0 | 6 | 0 | 18 |
| Spain | 2 | 0 | 2 | 2 | 6 |
| Sweden | 3 | 1 | 2 | 6 | 8 |
| Thailand | 5 | 2 | 3 | 9 | 9 |
| Tunisia | 7 | 6 | 1 | 20 | 4 |
| Turkey | 2 | 1 | 1 | 3 | 5 |
| United States | 8 | 3 | 5 | 11 | 19 |
| Venezuela | 1 | 1 | 0 | 3 | 0 |
| Vietnam | 3 | 3 | 0 | 9 | 1 |
| Total | 194 | 82 | 112 | 323 | 399 |

== See also ==
- V-League
- South Korea women's national volleyball team
