= Jin Seong-tae =

South Korean volleyball player (born 1993)

Personal information
- Nationality: South Korean
- Born: 3 February 1993 (age 33); Seoul, South Korea
- Height: 198 cm (6 ft 6 in)
- Weight: 91 kg (201 lb)
- Spike: 315 cm (10 ft 4 in)
- Block: 305 cm (10 ft 0 in)
- Education: Kyung Hee University

Volleyball information
- Position: Middle blocker
- Current club: Incheon Korean Air Jumbos
- Number: 19

Career
Years	Teams
2014–2016; 2016–	Hyundai Capital Skywalkers; Korean Air Jumbos

National team
2016–	South Korea
Honours
Asian Youth Championship
Bronze medal – third place	2010 Tehran
- Last updated: 5 February 2018

Jin Seong-tae (Korean: 진성태; born 3 February 1993 in Seoul) is a South Korean male volleyball player. He currently plays for the Incheon Korean Air Jumbos in the V-League.

== Career ==
=== Clubs ===
Jin was selected by the Hyundai Capital Skywalkers with the second pick of the second round (ninth overall) in the 2014 V-League Draft.

In the 2015-16 season, Jin became the Skywalkers' starting middle blocker alongside Choi Min-ho and posted career-highs in hitting percentage (58.25%), blocks per set (0.43) and points (163).

In the late of the 2015-16 season, three-time block per set champion Shin Yung-suk finished the military service and returned to the Skywalkers. With veteran middles Choi Min-ho and Shin Yung-suk on the 2016-17 Skywalkers' squad, Jin was projected to struggle to earn a starting spot. In the beginning of the 2016-17 season, Jin was eventually traded to the Korean Air Jumbos.

=== National team ===
In 2010 Jin got called up to the South Korean national under-18 team for the 2010 Asian Youth Championship where his team won the bronze medal. Next year, he participated in the 2011 World Youth Championship as part of the national youth team.

As a member of the South Korean national under-20 team, Jin also competed in the Asian Junior Championship in 2010 and 2012.

While attending Kyung Hee University, Jin took part in the 2013 Summer Universiade and the 2014 AVC Cup as a member of the South Korean collegiate national team.

In June 2016 Jin was first selected for the South Korean senior national team to compete at the 2016 FIVB World League.
