= 2025 AVC Men's Volleyball Nations Cup squads =

This article shows the squads of all participating teams for the 2025 AVC Men's Volleyball Nations Cup in Manama, Bahrain.

== Pool A ==
=== Bahrain ===
Head coach: (France) Arnaud Josserand

- 2 Mohamed Anan OP
- 4 Abbas Alkhabbaz MB
- 5 Husain Mansoor S
- 6 Sayed Hashem Ali OH
- 7 Mahmood Alafyah S
- 8 Mahmood Ahmed OH
- 9 Mohamed Abdulla MB
- 12 Hani Allawi MB
- 13 Ali Khamis OP
- 15 Naser Anan OH
- 17 Mohamed Abdulla Yaqoob OH
- 18 Ayman Haroon L
- 20 Abbas Sultan L
- 21 Hasan Warqaa MB

=== Indonesia ===
Head coach: (China) Jiang Jie

- 1 Hendrik Agel Kurniasandi L
- 3 Boy Arnez Arabi OH
- 4 Hendra Kurniawan MB
- 6 Muhammad Malizi MB
- 8 Jasen Natanael Kilanta S
- 9 Rama Fazza Fauzan OP
- 10 Fahry Septian Putratama OH
- 11 Doni Haryono OH
- 12 Rivan Nurmulki OP
- 14 Farhan Halim OH
- 15 Dio Zulfikri S
- 16 Tedy Oka Syahputra MB
- 17 Muhammad Ega Yuri Pradana MB
- 18 Ruby Rahmanto L

=== Thailand ===
Head coach: (South Korea) Park Ki-won

- 1 Nattapong Chachamnan L
- 2 Prasert Pinkaew MB
- 3 Amorntep Konhan OP
- 4 Anut Promchan OH
- 5 Kissada Nilsawai MB
- 7 Toopadit Phraput MB
- 14 Thanapat Charoensuk L
- 17 Boonyarid Wongtorn S
- 19 Supakorn Jenthaisong OH
- 20 Kiadtiphum Ramsin MB
- 22 Anurak Phanram OH
- 23 Narongrit Janpirom S
- 24 Warinthon Kamchoo OH
- 26 Chaiwat Thungkham OH

== Pool B ==
=== Australia ===
Head coach: Daniel Ilott

- 3 Lorenzo Pope OH
- 4 Jackson Holland L
- 8 Trent O'Dea MB
- 9 Matthew Aubrey OP
- 10 Sam Flowerday OH
- 13 Thomas Heptinstall OH
- 16 Mitchell Croft OH
- 17 Joel McGruther MB
- 19 William D'Arcy-Miles OP
- 21 Nicholas Butler S
- 22 Timothy Ebbs L
- 23 Jarvis Page S
- 27 Max Senica OH
- 40 Steven Yarad MB

=== Qatar ===
Head coach: (Argentina) Camilo Andres Soto

- 1 Youssef Oughlaf OH
- 2 Papemaguette Diagne L
- 4 Renan Ribeiro OH
- 5 Sulaiman Saad L
- 6 Borislav Georgiev S
- 7 Belal Nabel Abunabot MB
- 8 Waleed Widatalla OH
- 9 Miloš Stevanović S
- 11 Nikola Vasić OH
- 12 Mubarak Dahi OP
- 13 Raimi Wadidie OH
- 16 Ibrahim Ibrahim MB
- 19 Naji Mahmoud L
- 21 Osman Abdulwahid Wagihalla MB

== Pool C ==
=== Chinese Taipei ===
Head coach: Huang Hung-yu

- 1 Chang Yu-chen OH
- 2 Chen Bo-xun L
- 4 Wen Yi-kai OH
- 5 Lin Chien S
- 7 Chen Jie-ting S
- 9 Kan Mao-hung MB
- 11 Chen En-de OP
- 12 Liu Yu-lin OH
- 13 Hsu Rui-en MB
- 14 Chang Yu-sheng OP
- 15 Wang Ping-hsun MB
- 16 Li Chun-yu MB
- 19 Chen You-cheng L
- 20 Li Yuan OH

=== Pakistan ===
Head coach: (Iran) Rahman Mohammadirad

- 1 Salman Khan OH
- 7 Usman Faryad Ali OH
- 10 Fahad Raza OP
- 11 Murad Khan OP
- 13 Muhammad Kashif Naveed S
- 14 Abdul Zaheer MB
- 15 Murad Jehan OH
- 16 Afaq Khan OH
- 17 Hamid Yazman S
- 18 Musawer Khan MB
- 19 Nasir Ali L
- 21 Muhammad Yaseen L
- 24 Ahmed Nazir MB

=== Philippines ===
Head coach: (Italy) Angiolino Frigoni

- 2 Josh Ybañez L
- 3 Owa Retamar S
- 5 Steve Rotter OP
- 6 Jackson Reed OH
- 7 Kim Malabunga MB
- 8 John Paul Bugaoan MB
- 13 Jack Kalingking L
- 15 Marck Espejo OH
- 16 Peng Taguibolos MB
- 17 Leo Ordiales OP
- 19 Eco Adajar S
- 20 Lloyd Josafat MB
- 21 Louie Ramirez OH
- 22 Buds Buddin OH

== Pool D ==
=== New Zealand ===
Head coach: (Chile) Sebastian Gonzalez

- 1 Daniel Malcolm MB
- 3 Scott Shipton L
- 4 Matthew Butterfield MB
- 5 Andrew Salmon OH
- 7 Johann Timmer OH
- 8 Kameo Wagner S
- 9 Thomas Vesty S
- 11 Wernich Pheiffer OH
- 12 Mana Placid OH
- 13 Pesamino Morrison OP
- 14 Seth Grant OP
- 15 Luke McIntosh MB

=== South Korea ===
Head coach: (Brazil) Issanayê Ramires

- 2 Hwang Taek-eui S
- 3 Han Tae-jun S
- 4 Jang Ji-won L
- 5 Park Kyeong-min L
- 6 Kim Ju-yeong S
- 7 Heo Su-bong OH
- 11 Cha Young-seok MB
- 15 Lee Woo-jin OH
- 16 Hong Dong-seon OH
- 17 Im Dong-hyeok OP
- 18 Choi Jun-hyeok MB
- 20 Lee Sang-hyeon MB
- 30 Shin Ho-jin OP
- 99 Kim Ji-han OH

=== Vietnam ===
Head coach: Trần Đình Tiền

- 1 Đinh Văn Duy S
- 2 Trịnh Duy Phúc L
- 3 Dương Văn Tiên OH
- 4 Quản Trọng Nghĩa OH
- 5 Nguyễn Văn Quốc Duy OP
- 7 Chế Quốc Vô Lít MB
- 8 Trần Duy Tuyến MB
- 9 Trương Thế Khải MB
- 12 Nguyễn Thanh Hải MB
- 13 Phan Công Đức S
- 17 Nguyễn Ngọc Thuân OH
- 18 Phạm Quốc Dư OP
- 22 Hoàng Xuân Trường OH
- 23 Cao Đức Hoàng L
