= 2014 AVC Cup for Men =

International indoor volleyball tournament

2014 Asian Men's Volleyball Cup

Tournament details
- Host country: Kazakhstan
- City: Almaty
- Dates: 18–24 August
- Teams: 8 (from 1 confederation)
- Venue: 1 (in 1 host city)

Final positions
- Champions: South Korea (1st title)
- Runners-up: India
- Third place: Kazakhstan
- Fourth place: Iran

Tournament awards
- MVP: (South Korea) Seo Jae-duck

The 2014 Asian Men's Volleyball Cup, so-called 2014 AVC Cup for Men was the fourth edition of the AVC Cup for Men, played by top eight teams of the 2013 Asian Championship. The tournament was held at Baluan Sholak Sports Palace, Almaty, Kazakhstan from 18 to 24 August 2014.

== Pools composition ==
The teams are qualified based on their final ranking at the 2013 Asian Men's Volleyball Championship. Seeding is in accordance with the final ranking of 2012 Asian Men's Cup Volleyball Championship.

Pool A	Pool B
Kazakhstan (Host); Japan (3rd); South Korea; India	China (1st); Iran (2nd); Australia; Thailand

== Venue ==
All matches
Almaty, Kazakhstan
Baluan Sholak Sports Palace
Capacity: 5,000
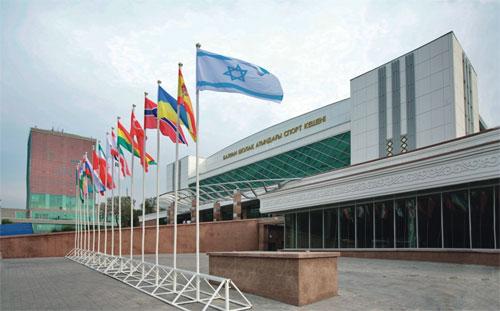

== Preliminary round ==
- All times are Almaty Time (UTC+06:00).

=== Pool A ===
Pos	Team	Pld	W	L	Pts	SW	SL	SR	SPW	SPL	SPR	Qualification
1	South Korea	3	3	0	9	9	2	4.500	273	223	1.224	Quarterfinals
2	India	3	2	1	6	7	3	2.333	242	215	1.126	Quarterfinals
3	Kazakhstan	3	1	2	3	3	6	0.500	194	206	0.942	Quarterfinals
4	Japan	3	0	3	0	1	9	0.111	190	255	0.745	Quarterfinals

Date	Time		Score		Set 1	Set 2	Set 3	Set 4	Set 5	Total	Report
18 Aug	16:00	South Korea	3–1	Japan	25–19	26–28	25–11	25–17		101–75	Report
18 Aug	19:00	Kazakhstan	0–3	India	23–25	17–25	19–25			59–75	Report
19 Aug	14:00	Japan	0–3	India	11–25	25–27	23–25			59–77	Report
19 Aug	18:00	South Korea	3–0	Kazakhstan	25–22	25–14	25–22			75–58	Report
20 Aug	16:00	India	1–3	South Korea	25–22	22–25	21–25	22–25		90–97	Report
20 Aug	19:00	Kazakhstan	3–0	Japan	25–19	25–12	27–25			77–56	Report

=== Pool B ===
Pos	Team	Pld	W	L	Pts	SW	SL	SR	SPW	SPL	SPR	Qualification
1	Iran	3	3	0	8	9	3	3.000	289	237	1.219	Quarterfinals
2	China	3	2	1	5	6	5	1.200	227	246	0.923	Quarterfinals
3	Thailand	3	1	2	5	7	6	1.167	287	274	1.047	Quarterfinals
4	Australia	3	0	3	0	1	9	0.111	211	257	0.821	Quarterfinals

Date	Time		Score		Set 1	Set 2	Set 3	Set 4	Set 5	Total	Report
18 Aug	11:00	Iran	3–2	Thailand	23–25	25–16	20–25	25–19	18–16	111–101	Report
18 Aug	14:00	China	3–0	Australia	25–21	25–22	25–21			75–64	Report
19 Aug	11:00	Australia	0–3	Thailand	14–25	20–25	27–29			61–79	Report
19 Aug	16:00	China	0–3	Iran	21–25	14–25	15–25			50–75	Report
20 Aug	11:00	Iran	3–1	Australia	25–13	28–30	25–23	25–20		103–86	Report
20 Aug	14:00	Thailand	2–3	China	25–19	22–25	25–18	22–25	13–15	107–102	Report

== Final round ==
- All times are Almaty Time (UTC+06:00).

Quarterfinals
22 August
Iran	3
Japan	0
22 August
India	3
Thailand	0
22 August
South Korea	3
Australia	1
22 August
China	2
Kazakhstan	3

Semifinals
23 August
Iran	1
India	3
23 August
South Korea	3
Kazakhstan	0

Final
24 August
India	0
South Korea	3
3rd place match
24 August
Iran	1
Kazakhstan	3

5th–8th semifinals
23 August
Japan	3
Thailand	2
23 August
Australia	1
China	3

5th place match
24 August
Japan	1
China	3
7th place match
24 August
Thailand	0
Australia	3

=== Quarterfinals ===
Date	Time		Score		Set 1	Set 2	Set 3	Set 4	Set 5	Total	Report
22 Aug	11:00	South Korea	3–1	Australia	26–28	26–24	25–19	25–19		102–90	Report
22 Aug	14:00	Iran	3–0	Japan	25–20	25–14	25–18			75–52	Report
22 Aug	16:00	India	3–0	Thailand	25–19	25–23	26–24			76–66	Report
22 Aug	18:00	China	2–3	Kazakhstan	20–25	22–25	32–30	25–21	13–15	112–116	Report

=== 5th–8th semifinals ===
Date	Time		Score		Set 1	Set 2	Set 3	Set 4	Set 5	Total	Report
23 Aug	11:00	Japan	3–2	Thailand	25–23	26–24	23–25	16–25	15–11	105–108	Report
23 Aug	14:00	Australia	1–3	China	22–25	33–31	20–25	22–25		97–106	Report

=== Semifinals ===
Date	Time		Score		Set 1	Set 2	Set 3	Set 4	Set 5	Total	Report
23 Aug	16:00	Iran	1–3	India	25–20	27–29	29–31	25–27		106–107	Report
23 Aug	18:00	South Korea	3–0	Kazakhstan	25–17	25–19	25–18			75–54	Report

=== 7th place match ===
Date	Time		Score		Set 1	Set 2	Set 3	Set 4	Set 5	Total	Report
24 Aug	11:00	Thailand	0–3	Australia	22–25	23–25	13–25			58–75	Report

=== 5th place match ===
Date	Time		Score		Set 1	Set 2	Set 3	Set 4	Set 5	Total	Report
24 Aug	14:00	Japan	1–3	China	20–25	25–21	12–25	23–25		80–96	Report

=== 3rd place match ===
Date	Time		Score		Set 1	Set 2	Set 3	Set 4	Set 5	Total	Report
24 Aug	16:00	Iran	1–3	Kazakhstan	23–25	25–17	19–25	16–25		83–92	Report

=== Final ===
Date	Time		Score		Set 1	Set 2	Set 3	Set 4	Set 5	Total	Report
24 Aug	18:00	India	0–3	South Korea	23–25	21–25	25–27			69–77	Report

== Final standing ==
Rank	Team
1st place, gold medalist(s)	South Korea
2nd place, silver medalist(s)	India
3rd place, bronze medalist(s)	Kazakhstan
4	Iran
5	China
6	Japan
7	Australia
8	Thailand

2014 Asian Men's Cup champions

South Korea
1st title

Team Roster
Song Myung-geun, Han Sun-soo, Shin Yung-suk, Lee Min-gyu, Park Sang-ha, Kwak Seung-suk, Bu Yong-chan, Choi Min-ho, Jeon Kwang-in, Park Chul-woo, Seo Jae-duck, Jeong Min-su
Head Coach: Park Ki-won

== Awards ==
- Most Valuable Player
  (South Korea) Seo Jae-duck
- Best Setter
  (South Korea) Han Sun-soo
- Best Outside Spikers
  (India) Sinnadhu Prabagaran
  (Iran) Saeid Shiroud
- Best Middle Blockers
  (India) G. R. Vaishnav
  (Iran) Mostafa Sharifat
- Best Opposite Spiker
  (South Korea) Seo Jae-duck
- Best Libero
  (Kazakhstan) Kairat Baibekov
