= Shin Young-soo =

South Korean volleyball player (born 1982)

Shin Young-Soo

Personal information
- Nationality: South Korean
- Born: 1 July 1982 (age 44); Daejeon, South Korea
- Height: 197 cm (6 ft 6 in)
- Weight: 90 kg (198 lb)
- Spike: 335 cm (132 in)
- Block: 313 cm (123 in)
- Education: Hanyang University

Volleyball information
- Position: Outside hitter
- Current club: Incheon Korean Air Jumbos
- Number: 1

Career
Years	Teams
2005–	Korean Air Jumbos

National team
2003–2010	South Korea
Honours
Men's volleyball
Asian Games
Bronze medal – third place	2010 Guangzhou
Asian Championship
Gold medal – first place	2003 Tianjin
AVC Cup
Silver medal – second place	2008 Nakhon Ratchasima
Universiade
Gold medal – first place	2003 Daegu
Asian Youth Championship
Gold medal – first place	1999 Chiayi

Shin Young-Soo (Korean: 신영수; born 1 July 1982) is a South Korean male volleyball player. He currently plays for the Incheon Korean Air Jumbos.
