= Lim Sung-jin =

South Korean volleyball player (born 1999)

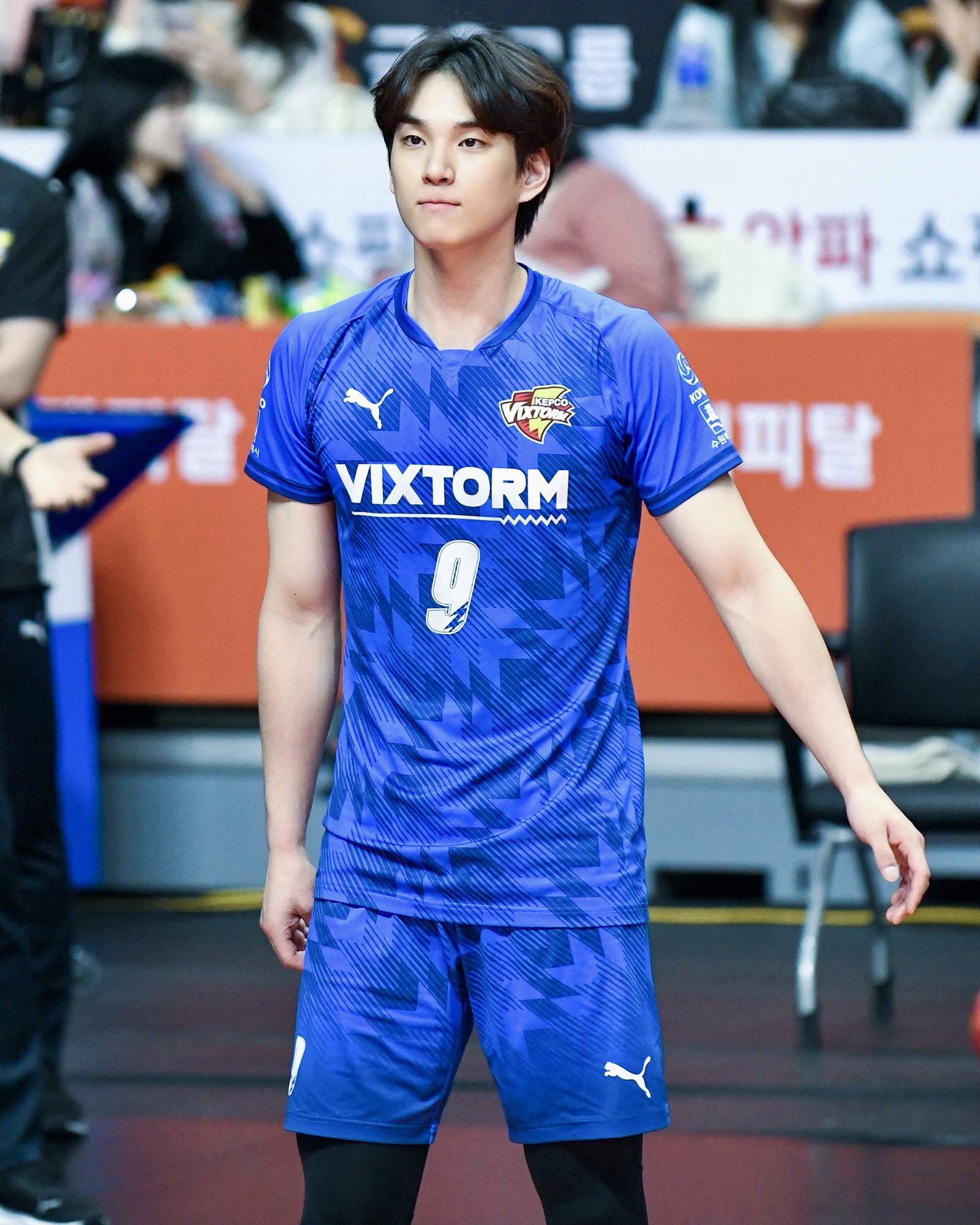
- Lim in 2024

Personal information
- Born: January 11, 1999 (age 27) Jecheon, South Korea
- Education: Sungkyunkwan University
- Height: 195 cm (6 ft 5 in)
- Weight: 85 kg (187 lb)

Volleyball information
- Position: Outside hitter

Career
- Years: Team
- 2020–2025: (South Korea) Suwon KEPCO Vixtorm
- 2025–: (South Korea) Uijeongbu KB Insurance Stars

National team
- Years: Team
- –: South Korea
- South Korea under-19: 2017
- South Korea Senior: 2022–
Honours
Men's Volleyball
Representing South Korea
Asian Championship
Bronze medal – third place	2026 Kitakyushu	Team

Korean name
- Hangul: 임성진
- Hanja: 林盛進
- RR: Im Seongjin
- MR: Im Sŏngjin

Lim Sung-jin (Korean: 임성진; born January 11, 1999) is a South Korean indoor volleyball player. He plays as an outside hitter for Uijeongbu KB Insurance Stars in the V-League.

== Early life and senior career ==
Lim Sung-jin was born on January 11, 1999, in Jecheon, North Chungcheong Province. He attended Yongdu Elementary School before transferring to Uirim Elementary, where he began playing volleyball. He enrolled at Jecheon Middle and Jecheon Industrial High School. In 2017, Lim was credited for playing a pivotal role in his high school's advancement in the Yeonggwang Cup Volleyball Championship. Lee Da-rae of Insight named his one of the best attackers on the team and a rising star of the next generation.

Lim was admitted to Sungkyunkwan University in 2018. At that year's National University Volleyball Tournament, he was credited in part for the institution's 3–0 victory in the inaugural match against Chosun University. As a third-year student, Lim applied for the 2020–2021 Korea Volleyball Federation (KOVO) Male Rookie Player Draft and signed with Suwon KEPCO Vixtorm as the second-round pick. He became a free agent at the end of the 2024–25 season, soon joining Uijeongbu KB Insurance Stars.

== International career ==
Lim was selected for the South Korea men's national under-19 volleyball team to compete in the 2017 FIVB Volleyball Boys' U19 World Championship. In the preliminary round against Bangladesh, he scored ten points, the third-most on his team. In the quarterfinals, Lim's thirteen points was credited in part for his team's victory against Taiwan. He was viewed as one of the driving forces that led the team to the tournament's semi-finals.

== Playing style and image ==
Lim plays as an opposite hitter who has been noted for his strengths in offense and defense. He played as a left-side hitter from high school; his frequency of attacks decreased in university, while the number of times serving and receiving the ball increased. Together with Lim Dong-hyuk, they have been dubbed "treasures" and the "national duo" of South Korean volleyball. He is also referred to as "Suwon's prince". Lim cites Song Hui-chae and Jung Ji-seok as his role models.
