= Hwang Dong-il =

South Korean volleyball player (born 1986)

Personal information
- Nationality: South Korean
- Born: 14 April 1986 (age 40); Ansan, Gyeonggi Province, South Korea
- Height: 194 cm (6 ft 4 in)
- Weight: 83 kg (183 lb)
- Spike: 327 cm (10 ft 9 in)
- Block: 320 cm (10 ft 6 in)
- Education: Kyonggi University

Volleyball information
- Position: Setter
- Current club: Daejeon Samsung Bluefangs
- Number: 6

Career
Years	Teams
2008; 2008–11; 2011–14; 2014–	Woori Capital Dream Six; LIG Greaters; Korean Air Jumbos; Samsung Fire Bluefangs

National team
2006–09	South Korea
Medal record
AVC Cup
Silver medal – second place	2008 Nakhon Ratchasima
Asian Junior Championship
Gold medal – first place	2004 Doha
- Last updated: 18 December 2017

Hwang Dong-il (Korean: 황동일; born 14 April 1986) is a South Korean male volleyball player. On club level he plays for the Daejeon Samsung Fire Bluefangs.

== Career ==
Hwang first garnered attention in 2004 when he won the gold medal at the Asian Junior Volleyball Championship as part of the South Korean junior national team. While attending Kyonggi University in 2005, Hwang was called-up to the South Korean U21 national team for the 2005 Junior World Volleyball Championship where his team finished sixth.

As a sophomore at Kyonggi University in June 2006, Hwang got called up to the South Korean senior national team and debuted with the national team at the 2006 Asia Challenge Cup, which South Korea won.

Hwang was selected fourth overall by the Woori Capital Dream Six in the 2008 V-League Draft and traded to the LIG Greaters in ten days. Hwang became the starting setter for the Greaters in his rookie season, and was named Rookie of the Year after the 2008–09 season.

In the beginning of the 2011–12 season, Hwang was traded to the Korean Air Jumbos but served as the backup to starting setter Han Sun-soo for the Jumbos between 2011 and 2014.

In 2014, Hwang was once again traded to the Samsung Fire Bluefangs. He was mostly on the bench to serve as a backup setter to You Kwang-woo or to play as the opposite spiker sporadically before franchise setter You Kwang-woo left the Bluefangs as a free agent to sign with the Woori Card Wibee after the 2016–17 season.

The following season, Hwang returned as the Bluefangs' starting setter under new coach Shin Jin-sik.
