= Bu Yong-chan =

South Korean volleyball player (born 1989)

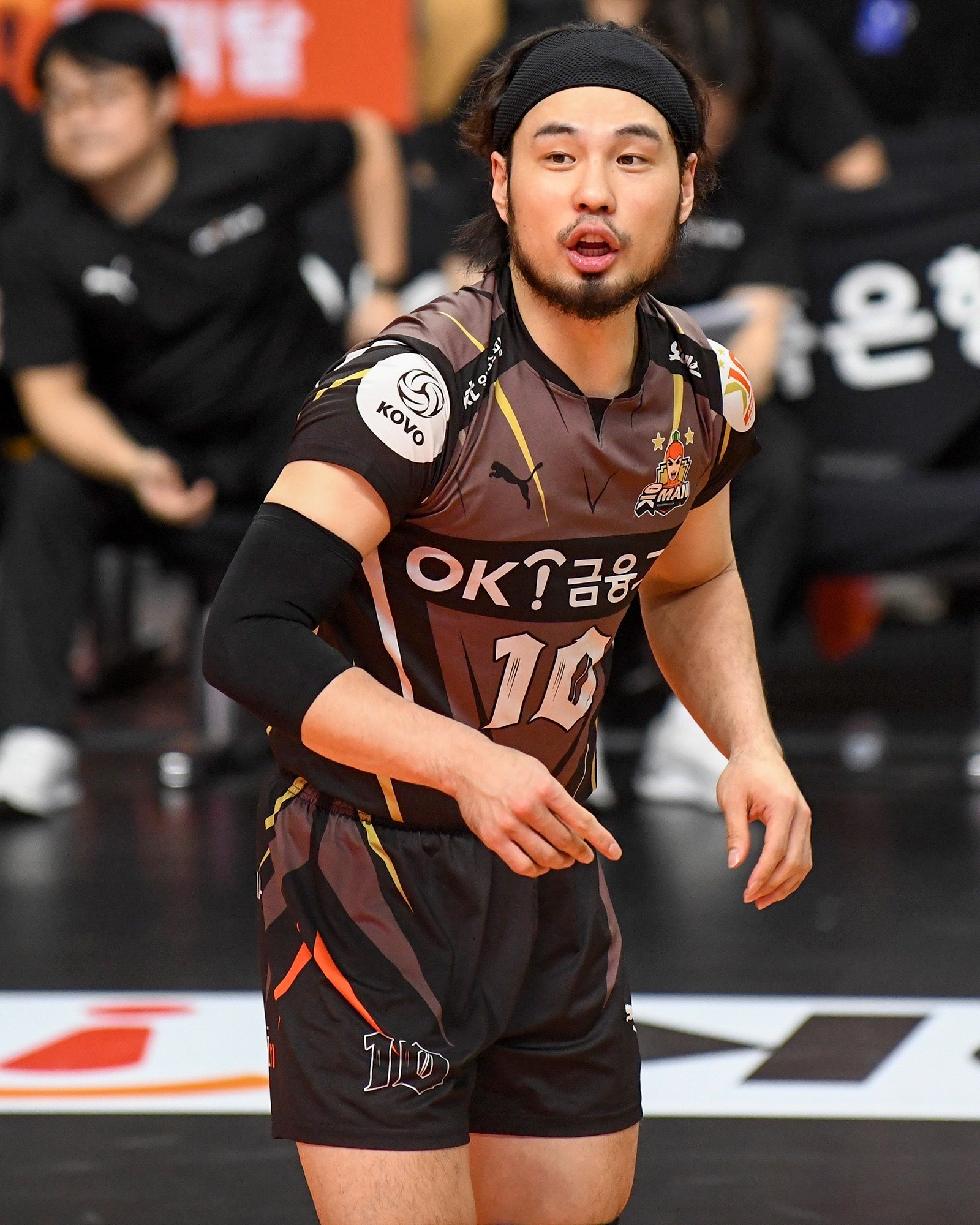
- Bu in 2024

Personal information
- Nationality: South Korean
- Born: 27 December 1989 (age 36); Seogwipo, Jeju-do
- Height: 1.75 m (5 ft 9 in)
- Weight: 65 kg (143 lb)
- Spike: 290 cm (114 in)
- Block: 284 cm (112 in)
- Education: Hanyang University

Volleyball information
- Position: Libero
- Current club: Daejeon Samsung Fire Bluefangs
- Number: 5

Career
Years	Teams
2011–2016; 2016–2018; 2018-	KB Insurance Stars; Samsung Fire Bluefangs; Ansan OK Savings Bank Rush & Cash

National team
2012–	South Korea
Honours
Asian Games
Silver medal – second place	2018 Jakarta
Bronze medal – third place	2014 Incheon
Asian Championship
Silver medal – second place	2013 Dubai
AVC Cup
Gold medal – first place	2014 Almaty
- Last updated: 20 December 2017

- Bu Yong-chan
- Hangul: 부용찬
- RR: Bu Yongchan
- MR: Pu Yongch'an

Bu Yong-chan (Korean: 부용찬; born 27 December 1989) is a South Korean male volleyball player. He currently plays the libero position for the Ansan OK Savings Bank Rush & Cash.

== Career ==
=== Clubs ===
In the 2011 V-League Draft, Bu was selected third overall by the LIG Greaters. After the 2015–16 season, Bu was traded to the Samsung Fire Bluefangs in exchange for veteran middle blocker Lee Sun-kyu.

=== National team ===
In June 2012 Bu was first selected for the South Korean senior national team to compete at the 2012 FIVB World League.

Bu took part as the starting libero for the South Korean national team at the 2013 Asian Championship, where the team won the silver medal.

He was also a member of the national team at the 2014 FIVB World Championship in Poland.

== Individual awards ==
=== Club ===
- 2017 V-League - Best Libero
