= Ha Hyun-yong =

South Korean volleyball player (born 1982)

Personal information
- Nationality: South Korean
- Born: 9 May 1982 (age 44)
- Height: 198 cm (6 ft 6 in)
- Weight: 88 kg (194 lb)
- Spike: 330 cm (130 in)
- Block: 322 cm (127 in)
- Education: Kyonggi University

Volleyball information
- Position: Middle blocker
- Current club: Uijeongbu KB Stars
- Number: 7 (club); 18 (national team)

Career
Years	Teams
2005–	(South Korea) LIG Greaters / KB Stars

National team
2005–	South Korea
Honours
Men's volleyball
Representing South Korea
Asian Games
Bronze medal – third place	2010 Guangzhou
Asian Championship
Bronze medal – third place	2005 Suphan Buri
Bronze medal – third place	2007 Jakarta
Bronze medal – third place	2011 Tehran
AVC Cup
Silver medal – second place	2008 Nakhon Ratchasima
Universiade
Gold medal – first place	2003 Daegu

Ha Hyun-yong (Korean: 하현용; born 9 May 1982) is a South Korean male volleyball player. He currently plays for the Uijeongbu KB Insurance Stars.

== Career ==
=== Clubs ===
Ha was selected ninth overall by the LIG Greaters in the 2005 V-League Draft, and won the Rookie of the Year Award after the league's inaugural season.

=== National team ===
As a junior at Kyonggi University in 2003, Ha was a member of the team which won the gold medal in the 2003 Summer Universiade defeating Japan in final. He also won the bronze medal at the 2010 Asian Games held in Guangzhou, as part of the South Korean national team.

Ha had consistently participated in the FIVB World League after his debut in 2006 and made his fifth appearance in the tournament in 2014.
