= Jin Sang-houn =

South Korean volleyball player (born 1986)

Personal information
- Nationality: South Korean
- Born: 22 April 1986 (age 40); Seoul, South Korea
- Height: 200 cm (6 ft 7 in)
- Weight: 86 kg (190 lb)
- Spike: 336 cm (11 ft 0 in)
- Block: 324 cm (10 ft 8 in)
- Education: Hanyang University

Volleyball information
- Position: Middle blocker
- Current club: OK Financial Group Okman
- Number: 16

Career
Years	Teams
2007–2020; 2020–	Korean Air Jumbos; OK Financial Group Okman

National team
2013–	South Korea
Honours
Asian Championship
Silver medal – second place	2013 Dubai
Bronze medal – third place	2017 Gresik
- Last updated: 7 April 2021

Jin Sang-houn (Korean: 진상헌; born 22 April 1986) is a South Korean male volleyball player. He currently plays for the OK Financial Group Okman in the V-League.

== Career ==
=== Clubs ===
Jin was selected by the Korean Air Jumbos with the third pick of the first round in the 2007 V-League Draft.

=== National team ===
In 2013 Jin was first selected for the South Korean senior national team to compete at the 2013 Asian Championship, where South Korea won the silver medal.

Jin also took part in the 2017 Asian Championship, where he helped his team to win the bronze medal.
