= Lee Kang-won =

South Korean volleyball player

Personal information
- Nationality: South Korean
- Born: 5 May 1990 (age 36); Daegu, South Korea
- Height: 198 cm (6 ft 6 in)
- Weight: 91 kg (201 lb)
- Spike: 330 cm (130 in)
- Block: 312 cm (123 in)
- Education: Kyung Hee University

Volleyball information
- Position: Opposite hitter
- Current club: Daejeon Samsung Fire Bluefangs
- Number: 1 (club); 7 (national team)

Career
Years	Teams
2013–2018; 2018–	LIG / KB Fire; Samsung Fire

National team
2017–	South Korea
Honours
Asian Championship
Bronze medal – third place	2017 Gresik

Lee Kang-Won (Korean: 이강원; born 5 May 1990) is a South Korean male volleyball player. He is part of the South Korea men's national volleyball team. On club level he plays for the Daejeon Samsung Fire Bluefangs.

== Career ==
As a junior at Kyunghee University in 2012, Lee was selected for the South Korean collegiate national team to compete at the 2012 Asian Men's Cup Volleyball Championship, where the team finished in fifth place. He competed in the 2013 Summer Universiade in Kazan, Russia, and was the flag-bearer for his nation during the opening ceremonies of those games.

In 2017 Lee got called up to the senior national squad for the first time and competed at the 2017 FIVB World League where he played as the starting opposite hitter in all nine games.
