= Park Jin-woo (volleyball) =

South Korean volleyball player (born 1990)

Personal information
- Nationality: South Korean
- Born: 18 March 1990 (age 36)
- Height: 198 cm (6 ft 6 in)
- Weight: 78 kg (172 lb)
- Spike: 340 cm (134 in)
- Block: 318 cm (125 in)

Volleyball information
- Number: 23 (national team)

Career
Years	Teams
2015	Kyeonggi University

National team
2015	South Korea

Park Jin-woo (born 18 March 1990) is a South Korean male volleyball player. He is part of the South Korea men's national volleyball team. On club level he plays for Kyeonggi University.
