= Park Sang-ha =

South Korean volleyball player (born 1986)

Personal information
- Nationality: South Korean
- Born: 4 April 1986 (age 40); Jecheon, North Chungcheong Province, South Korea
- Height: 1.98 m (6 ft 6 in)
- Weight: 89 kg (196 lb)
- Spike: 327 cm (129 in)
- Block: 315 cm (124 in)
- Education: Kyung Hee University

Volleyball information
- Position: Middle blocker
- Current club: Daejeon Samsung Bluefangs
- Number: 17

Career
Years	Teams
2008–2017; 2017–	Woori Card Wibee; Samsung Fire Bluefangs

National team
2008–	South Korea
Honours
Representing South Korea
Asian Games
Bronze medal – third place	2014 Incheon
Asian Championship
Silver medal – second place	2013 Dubai
AVC Cup
Gold medal – first place	2014 Almaty

Park Sang-ha (Korean: 박상하; born 4 April 1986 in Jecheon, North Chungcheong Province) is a South Korean volleyball player. He currently plays as a middle blocker for the Daejeon Samsung Fire Bluefangs.

== Career ==
=== Clubs ===
Park was selected fifth overall by the Woori Capital Dream Six in the 2008 V-League Draft.

Park began his club career as the opposite spiker when 6' 6" (1.98 m) setter Vlado Petković played in the team. Park converted his position to middle blocker as Petković left the team after the 2009–10 season.

After the 2016–17 season, Park was signed with the Samsung Fire Bluefangs as a free agent.

=== National team ===
As a senior at Kyung Hee University in 2008, Park was first selected for the South Korean senior national team to compete at the 2008 FIVB World League.
