= Kwak Seung-suk =

South Korean volleyball player (born 1988)

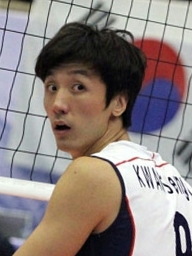
- Kwak Seung-suk with the Korea national team in 2015

Personal information
- Nationality: South Korean
- Born: 23 March 1988 (age 38); Busan
- Height: 1.90 m (6 ft 3 in)
- Weight: 81 kg (179 lb)
- Spike: 325 cm (128 in)
- Block: 320 cm (126 in)
- Education: Kyonggi University

Volleyball information
- Position: Outside hitter
- Current club: Incheon Korean Air Jumbos
- Number: 9

Career
Years	Teams
2010–	Korean Air Jumbos

National team
2011–	South Korea
Honours
Asian Games
Silver medal – second place	2018 Jakarta
Bronze medal – third place	2014 Incheon
Asian Championship
Silver medal – second place	2013 Dubai
AVC Cup
Gold medal – first place	2014 Almaty

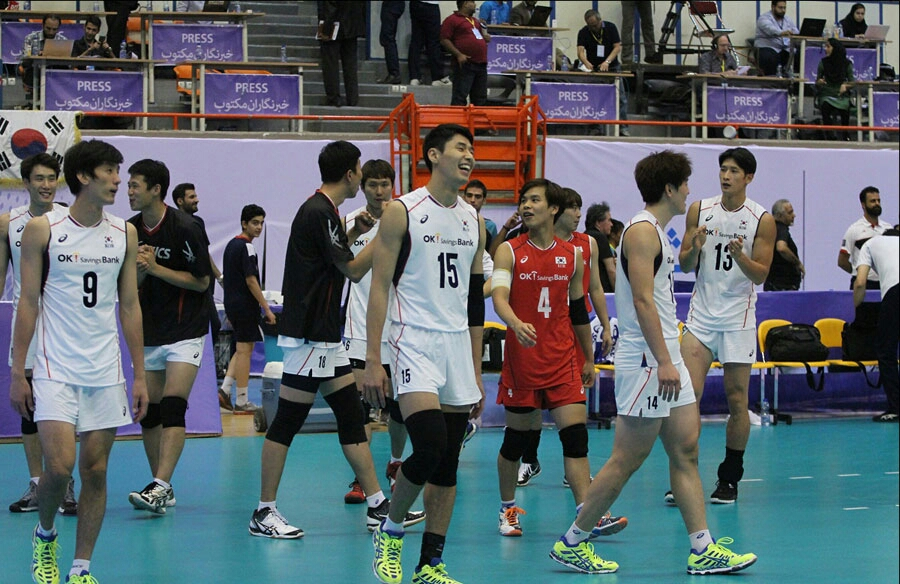
Kwak Seung-suk (left)

Kwak Seung-suk (Korean: 곽승석; born 23 March 1988) is a South Korean volleyball player. He was part of the South Korea men's national volleyball team at the 2014 FIVB Volleyball Men's World Championship in Poland. He currently plays for the Incheon Korean Air Jumbos.
