= Hwang Taek-eui =

South Korean volleyball player (born 1996)

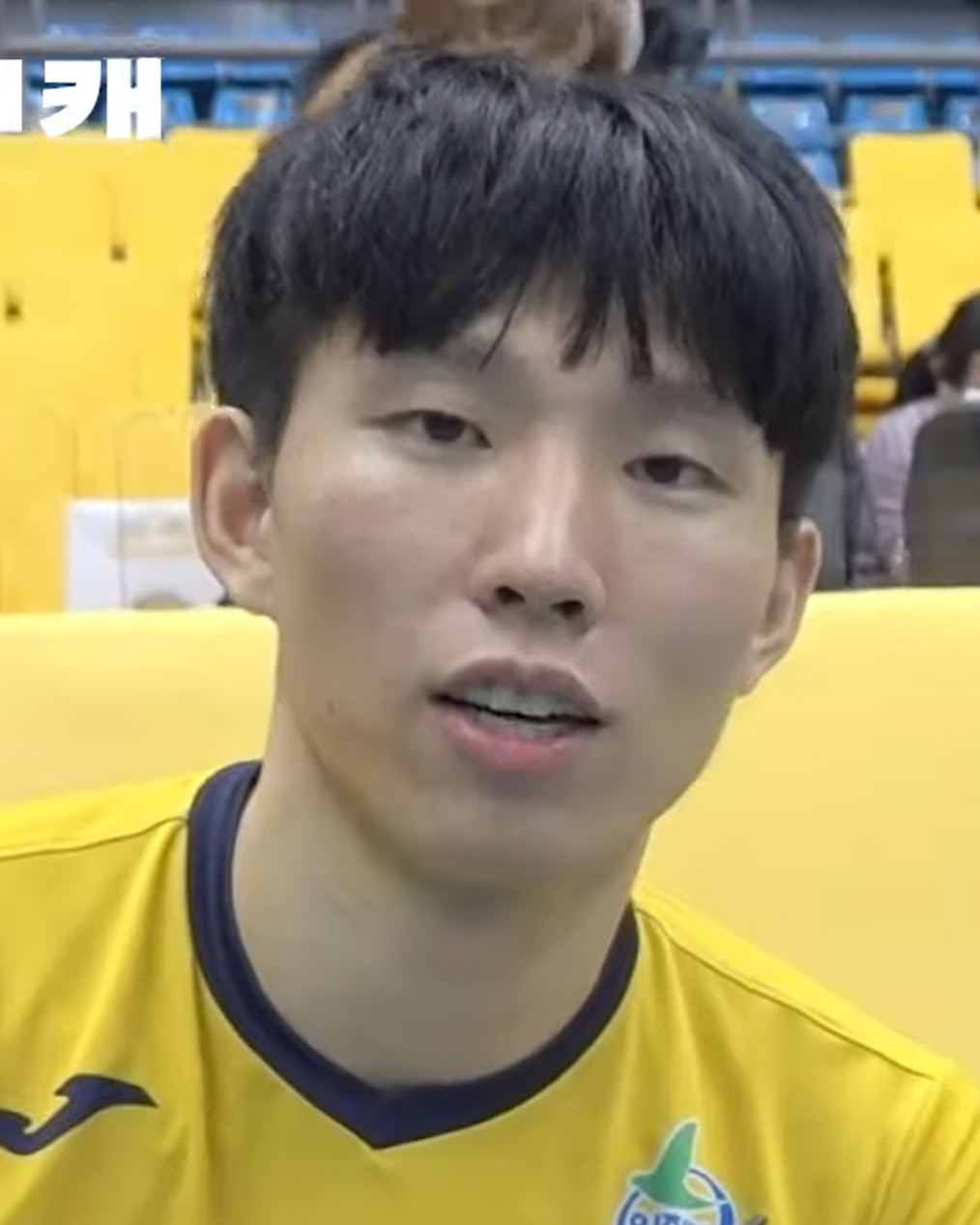
- Hwang in 2020

Personal information
- Nationality: South Korean
- Born: 12 November 1996 (age 29); Seoul, South Korea
- Height: 190 cm (6 ft 3 in)
- Weight: 77 kg (170 lb)
- Education: Sungkyunkwan University

Volleyball information
- Position: Setter
- Current club: Uijeongbu KB Stars
- Number: 2 (club); 21 (national team)

Career
Years	Teams
2016–	KB Insurance Stars

National team
2017–	South Korea
Honours
Volleyball
Representing Korea
International Competitions
Bronze medal – third place	2024	Asian Men's Volleyball Challenge Cup

Hwang Taek-eui (Korean: 황택의; born 12 November 1996 in Seoul) is a South Korean male volleyball player. He is part of the South Korea men's national volleyball team. On club level he plays for the Uijeongbu KB Insurance Stars.

== Career ==
While attending Sungkyunkwan University in 2015, Hwang was called-up to the South Korean collegiate national team for the 2015 U23 World Championship where his team finished in eighth place.

Hwang decided to forgo his final two years of collegiate eligibility and declared for the 2016 V-League Draft. Hwang was selected first overall by the Gumi LIG Greaters in the 2016 V-League Draft. Hwang was the first setter ever to be taken with the first overall pick in the V-League Draft.

After the 2016–17 V-League season, Hwang was named Rookie of the Year. In May 2017 Hwang was first selected for the South Korean senior national team to compete at the 2017 FIVB World League. He played as the starting setter in Team Korea's final game against Slovakia and led his team to a 3–2 victory, though he was mostly on the bench serving as the third-string setter behind Lee Min-gyu and No Jae-wook during the competition.

== Awards ==
=== Individual ===
- 2023: Asian Challenge Cup – Best setter

== Controversy ==
Controversy arose over sexual harassment by sending a message to a woman asking for sex and asking her to go to a motel.
