= G. R. Vaishnav =

Indian volleyball player (born 1990)

G R VAISHNAV

Personal information
- Born: 11 February 1990 (age 36)
- Height: 207 cm (6 ft 9 in)
- Weight: 100 kg (220 lb)
- Spike: 357 cm (141 in)
- Block: 340 cm (130 in)

Volleyball information
- Position: CENTRE BLOCKER
- Current club: IOB
- Number: 1 or 11

National team
2007 - Present	India

G R Vaishnav (born 11 February 1990) is a member of the India men's national volleyball team. He wears the Number 1 or 11 Jersey for the Team. He also plays for Indian overseas bank volleyball team. He hails from Coimbatore presently at Chennai.

He played the 2009 Junior world championship at Pune, In which India secured fourth place in U-21 World championship, for the first time ever. He also played 2014 Asian Cup and secured Silver in Asia for the very first time, and got an individual award of Best Blocker. Currently he plays for Ahmedabad Defenders in Pro Volleyball League.

== Sports career ==
Started volleyball in the age of 12 in M Nanjappa chettiar matriculation school, Coimbatore and started professionally from the class of 11th in Ramakrishna Mission Vidyalaya, Coimbatore , Swami Shivananda Sports School and joined in Sri Krishna Arts and Science College (a) Kovai volleyball academy (now called as Sriram Volleyball Academy) trained under Indian volleyball team coach G. E. Sridharan – Arjuna Award and Dronacharya Award and after couples of years of hard work and dedication selected to India men's national volleyball team Taminadu State Senior Men team from 2008 and received a job from Indian Overseas Bank as Manager.

== International ==
Gold medal in Volleyball at the 2016 South Asian Games

Fifth in Volleyball at the 2014 Asian Games

Silver medal in 2014 Asian Men's Volleyball Cup

2012 Asian Men's Volleyball Cup

2013 Asian Men's Volleyball Championship

2011 Asian Men's Volleyball Championship

FIVB Volleyball Men's U21 World Championship

2010 Asian Junior Men's Volleyball Championship

2009 FIVB Volleyball Men's U21 World Championship

2009 FIVB Volleyball Boys' U19 World Championship

2008 Asian Youth Boys Volleyball Championship

ASIAN ZONAL QUALIFICATION FOR WORLD CHAMPIONSHIP ( SRI LANKA –Round 1 ) 2013 WINNERS

CHINA CHALLENGERS TROPHY ( CHINA) 2013 SILVER MEDAL

TEST MATCHES AT ITALY 2009 POLAND2009 TUNISIA 2010 & 2011 INDIA – EGYPT TEST MATCH WINNERS (2008)

== Individual awards ==
- BEST BLOCKER in ASIA CUP 2014 KAZAKHSTAN
- BEST BLOCKER IN Junior ASIAN CHAMPIONSHIP 2010 Thailand
- BEST BLOCKER IN TUNIS, QATAR, DUBAI, MALAYSIA

== Tamilnadu ==
- SENIOR NATIONALS 2017-18 Kerala Fourth
- SENIOR NATIONALS 2016-17 Chennai Bronze medal
- SENIOR NATIONALS 2015-16 Bangalore Bronze medal
- FEDERATION CUP 2015 SILVER MEDAL
- SENIOR NATIONALS 2014-15 (CHENNAI) SILVER MEDAL
- NATIONAL GAMES 2014 ( CALICUT ) - GOLD MEDAL
- FEDERATION CUP 2013 ( KERALA ) - WINNERS
- SENIOR NATIONALS 2013 ( UTTHARPRADESH) – GOLD MEDAL
- SENIOR NATIONALS 2012 ( JAIPUR ) SILVER MEDAL
- SENIOR NATIONALS 2011 ( RAIPUR ) FOURTH
- SENIOR NATIONALS 2008 ( JAIPUR ) SILVER MEDAL
- JUNIOR NATIONAL 2006 GOLD MEDAL

== Club ==
- INDIAN OVERSEAS BANK
- NATIONAL CLUB CHAMPIONSHIP WINNERS 2015
- NATIONAL CLUB CHAMPIONSHIP SILVER MEDAL 2012 & 2013
- WINNERS IN STATE CHAMPIONSHIP CONTINUOUSLY FROM 2008 TO 2013, 2016, 2017
- Al Rayan
- VOLIQ
- Qatar Dubai Malaysia Kuwait
