= Choi Hong-suk =

South Korean volleyball player (1988–2024)

Choi Hong-Suk

Personal information
- Nationality: South Korean
- Born: 26 June 1988; Busan, South Korea
- Died: 9 January 2024 (aged 35)
- Height: 195 cm (6 ft 5 in)
- Weight: 80 kg (176 lb)
- Spike: 328 cm (129 in)
- Block: 320 cm (126 in)

Volleyball information
- Number: 16 (national team)

Career
Years	Teams
2015	Seoul Woori Card Wibee

National team
2015	South Korea

Choi Hong-Suk (26 June 1988 – 9 January 2024) was a South Korean male volleyball player. He was part of the South Korea men's national volleyball team. On club level, he played for Seoul Woori Card Wibee.

Choi Hong-Suk died on 9 January 2024, at the age of 35.
