= Lee Sun-kyu =

South Korean volleyball player (born 1981)

Personal information
- Nationality: South Korean
- Born: 14 March 1981 (age 45); Seoul
- Height: 199 cm (6 ft 6 in)
- Weight: 90 kg (198 lb)
- Spike: 325 cm (128 in)
- Block: 320 cm (126 in)
- Education: Hanyang University

Volleyball information
- Position: Middle blocker
- Current club: Uijeongbu KB Stars
- Number: 9

Career
| Years | Teams |
|---|---|
| 2003–2013; 2013–2016; 2016–2019 | Hyundai Capital Skywalkers; Samsung Bluefangs; KB Stars |

National team
| 2003–2017 | South Korea |
Honours
Men's volleyball
Representing South Korea
Asian Games
| Gold medal – first place | 2006 Doha |
Asian Championship
| Gold medal – first place | 2003 Tianjin |
| Bronze medal – third place | 2005 Suphan Buri |
| Bronze medal – third place | 2007 Jakarta |
| Bronze medal – third place | 2009 Manila |
| Bronze medal – third place | 2011 Tehran |
AVC Cup
| Silver medal – second place | 2008 Nakhon Ratchasima |
Universiade
| Gold medal – first place | 2003 Daegu |
Asian Youth Championship
| Gold medal – first place | 1999 Chiayi |

Lee Sun-kyu (Korean: 이선규; born 14 March 1981) is a South Korean male volleyball player. He currently plays for the Uijeongbu KB Insurance Stars.

== Career ==
=== Clubs ===
Lee began his club career in 2003 after signing a contract with the Hyundai Capital Skywalkers.

Prior to the 2013–14 season, Lee was traded to the Samsung Fire Bluefangs for Yeo Oh-hyun.

Lee remained with the Bluefangs for three years before signing a contract with the KB Insurance Stars as a free agent on May 19, 2016.

Lee recorded his 900th career block on December 17, 2016. Lee is the only player in V-League history to over 900 blocks in a career. Lee also scored his 3,000th career point on November 22, 2017, becoming the only middle blocker in V-League history to over 3,000 points in a career.

=== National team ===
Lee first joined the national team program in 1999 as a member of the South Korean national under-18 team. He helped the team win gold at the 1999 Asian Youth Championship, and qualify for the 1999 World Youth Championship.

In 2003 Lee was a member of the collegiate national team which won the gold medal in the 2003 Summer Universiade defeating Japan in final. He also won the gold medal at the 2003 Asian Championship held in Tianjin, as part of the South Korean national team.

Lee was part of the national team at the 2006 FIVB World Championship in Japan, where the team finished in 17th place.

Lee had consistently participated in the FIVB World League after his debut in 2006 and made his seventh appearance in the tournament in 2017.

== Individual awards ==
=== Club ===
- 2016 V-League - Best Blocker

=== National team ===
- 2005 Asian Championship - Best Spiker
