= Song Myung-geun =

South Korean volleyball player (born 1993)

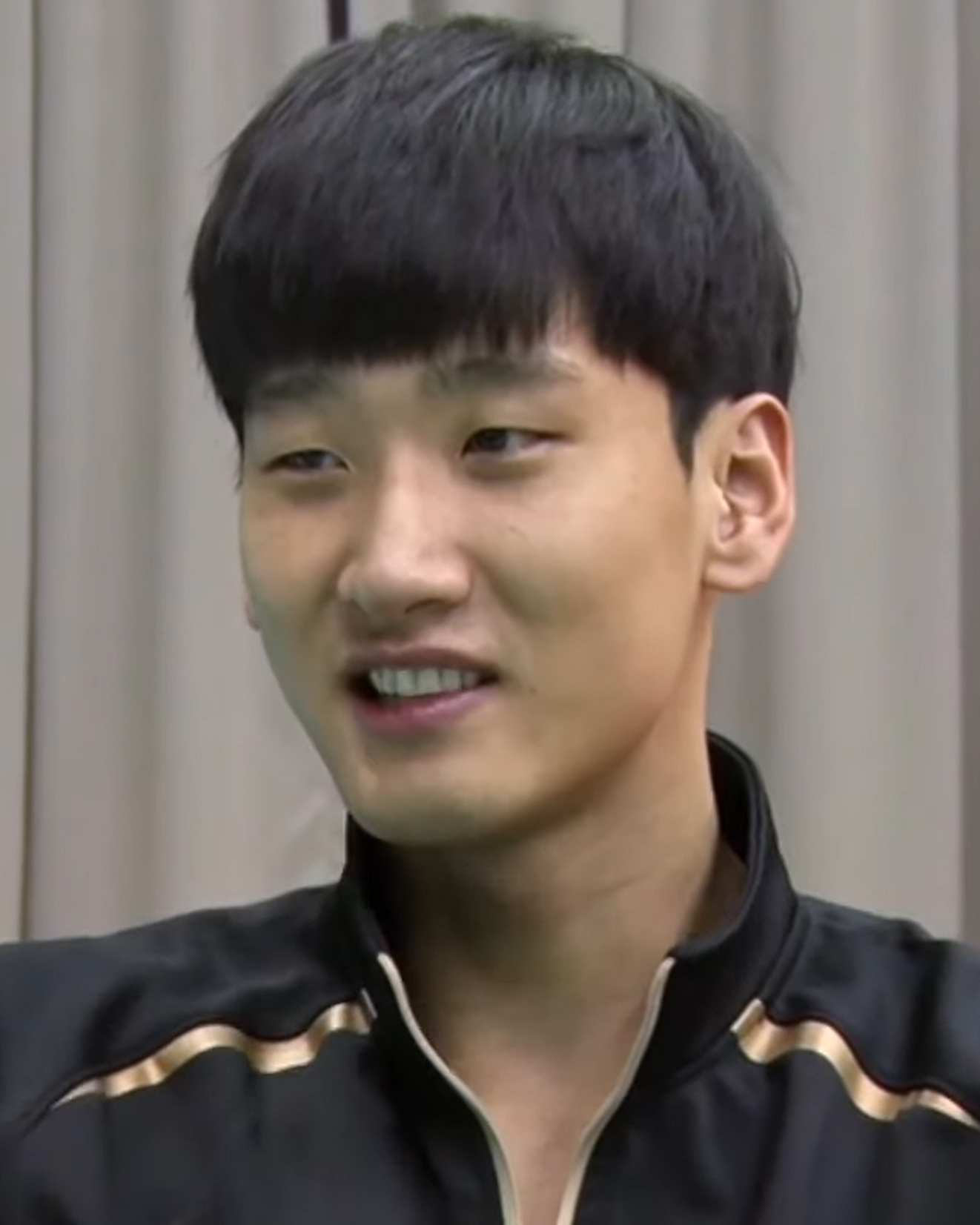
- Song in 2020

Personal information
- Nationality: South Korean
- Born: 12 March 1993 (age 33); Cheonan, South Korea
- Height: 1.95 m (6 ft 5 in)
- Weight: 83 kg (183 lb)
- Spike: 315 cm (124 in)
- Block: 305 cm (120 in)

Volleyball information
- Position: Outside hitter
- Current club: (South Korea) Ansan OK Savings Bank
- Number: 1

Career
Years	Teams
2011–	(South Korea) Ansan OK Savings Bank

National team
2012–	South Korea
Honours
Representing South Korea
Asian Games
Silver medal – second place	2018 Jakarta
Bronze medal – third place	2014 Incheon
Asian Championship
Silver medal – second place	2013 Dubai
AVC Cup
Gold medal – first place	2014 Almaty

- Song Myung-geun
- Hangul: 송명근
- RR: Song Myeonggeun
- MR: Song Myŏnggŭn

Song Myung-geun (Korean: 송명근; born 12 March 1993) is a volleyball player from South Korea. He currently plays as an outside hitter for the Ansan OK Savings Bank. As a sophomore at Kyonggi University in 2012, Song made his first appearance for the South Korean national team and competed in the 2012 FIVB Volleyball World League, where the team finished in 14th place. He also competed in the World League in 2013 and 2014, and won the gold medal at the 2014 Asian Men's Cup Volleyball Championship.
