= Park Joo-hyeong =

South Korean volleyball player (born 1987)

Personal information
- Nationality: South Korean
- Born: 5 August 1987 (age 39); Busan, South Korea
- Height: 193 cm (6 ft 4 in)
- Weight: 80 kg (176 lb)
- Spike: 335 cm (11 ft 0 in)
- Block: 325 cm (10 ft 8 in)
- Education: Sungkyunkwan University

Volleyball information
- Position: Outside hitter
- Current club: Hyundai Capital Skywalkers
- Number: 9 (club); 2 (national team)

Career
Years	Teams
2010–2011; 2011–	Woori Capital Dream Six; Hyundai Capital Skywalkers

National team
2017–	South Korea
Honours
Asian Championship
Bronze medal – third place	2017 Gresik
- Last updated: 28 December 2017

Park Joo-hyeong (Korean: 박주형; born 5 August 1987) is a South Korean male volleyball player. He is part of the South Korea men's national volleyball team. On club level he plays for the Cheonan Hyundai Capital Skywalkers.

== Career ==
=== Clubs ===
In the 2010 V-League Draft, Park was selected second overall by Woori Capital Dream Six.

After having a mediocre rookie season in Woori Capital, Park was traded to the Hyundai Capital Skywalkers in 2011. Park started to play the starting outside hitter in the 2014–15 season after serving as a backup in the Skywalkers for three years.

In the 2016–17 season, Park won his first championship, helping the Skywalkers clinch their third V-League title.

=== National team ===
In 2005 Park got called up to the South Korean U19 national team for the 2005 FIVB U19 World Championship where his team finished ninth.

In May 2017 Park was first selected for the South Korean senior national team to compete at the 2017 FIVB World League. Park played as the starting outside hitter in Team Korea's third game against Finland and led his team to 3:2 victory, scoring 24 points including three blocks and one ace. After finishing the World League in 18th place, he also took part in the 2017 Asian Championship, where South Korea won the bronze medal.
