= Oh Jae-seong =

South Korean volleyball player (born 1992)

Oh Jae-Seong

Personal information
- Nationality: South Korean
- Born: 2 April 1992 (age 34)
- Height: 175 cm (5 ft 9 in)
- Weight: 60 kg (132 lb)
- Spike: 285 cm (112 in)
- Block: 275 cm (108 in)

Volleyball information
- Number: 25 (national team)

Career
Years	Teams
2015	Kepco 45

National team
2015	South Korea

Oh Jae-Seong (born 2 April 1992) is a South Korean male volleyball player. He is part of the South Korea men's national volleyball team. On club level he plays for Kepco 45.
