= Kim Jae-hwi =

South Korean volleyball player (born 1993)

Personal information
- Nationality: South Korean
- Born: 6 September 1993 (age 33); Seoul, South Korea
- Height: 201 cm (6 ft 7 in)
- Weight: 91 kg (201 lb)
- Spike: 330 cm (10 ft 10 in)
- Block: 320 cm (10 ft 6 in)
- Education: Hanyang University

Volleyball information
- Position: Middle blocker
- Current club: Hyundai Capital Skywalkers
- Number: 19

Career
Years	Teams
2015–	Hyundai Capital Skywalkers

National team
2017–	South Korea
Honours
Asian Games
Silver medal – second place	2018 Jakarta
Asian Championship
Bronze medal – third place	2017 Gresik
Military World Games
Silver medal – second place	2019 Wuhan
- Last updated: 28 December 2017

Kim Jae-hwi (Korean: 김재휘; born 6 September 1993 in Seoul) is a South Korean male volleyball player. He is part of the South Korea men's national volleyball team. On club level he plays for the Cheonan Hyundai Capital Skywalkers.

== Career ==
=== Clubs ===
In the 2015 V-League Draft, Kim was selected second overall by the Hyundai Capital Skywalkers.

In the 2016–17 season, Kim won his first championship, helping the Skywalkers clinch their third V-League title.

=== National team ===
In 2011 Kim joined the South Korean national under-19 team for the 2011 FIVB World Youth (U19) Championship, where his team finished in 14th place.

In July 2017 Kim first got called up to the South Korean senior national team for the 2017 Asian Championship, where South Korea won the bronze medal.
