= Im Do-hun =

South Korean volleyball player (born 1972)

- Im Do-hun in 2011

Personal information
- Nationality: South Korean
- Born: 9 June 1972 (age 54)

Sport
- Sport: Volleyball

Im Do-hun (born 9 June 1972) is a South Korean volleyball player. He competed at the 1992 Summer Olympics and the 1996 Summer Olympics.
