= Shin Yung-suk =

South Korean male volleyball player (born 1986)

Shin Yung-Suk
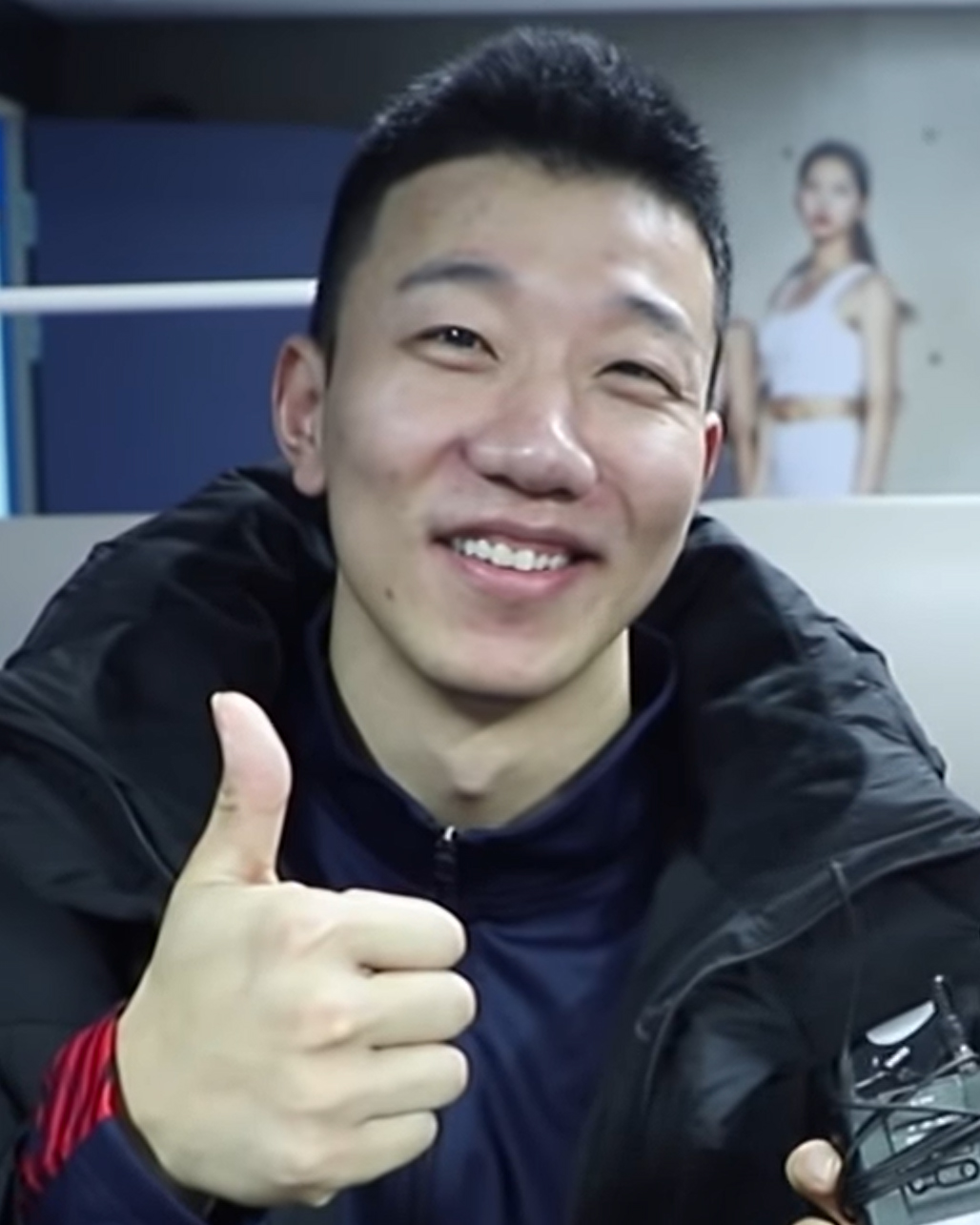
- Shin in 2019

Personal information
- Nationality: South Korean
- Born: 4 October 1986 (age 40); Gyeonggi Province
- Height: 1.98 m (6 ft 6 in)
- Weight: 90 kg (198 lb)
- Spike: 335 cm (132 in)
- Block: 325 cm (128 in)
- Education: Kyonggi University

Volleyball information
- Position: Middle blocker
- Current club: Suwon Korea Electric Power Corporation Vixtorm
- Number: 18

Career
Years	Teams
2008–2014; 2014–2020; 2021-	Woori Card Hansae; Hyundai Capital Skywalkers; Suwon KEPCO Vixtorm

National team
2007–	South Korea
Honours
Asian Games
Bronze medal – third place	2010 Guangzhou
Bronze medal – third place	2014 Incheon
Asian Championship
Bronze medal – third place	2011 Tehran
Bronze medal – third place	2017 Gresik
AVC Cup
Gold medal – first place	2014 Almaty
Silver medal – second place	2008 Nakhon Ratchasima
Asian Junior Championship
Gold medal – first place	2004 Doha
- Last updated: 26 December 2017

Shin Yung-Suk (Korean: 신영석; born 4 October 1986) is a South Korean male volleyball player. He was part of the South Korea men's national volleyball team at the 2014 FIVB World Championship in Poland. He currently plays for the Suwon KEPCO Vixtorm.

== Career ==
=== Clubs ===
Shin was selected with the second overall pick in the first round by the Woori Capital Dream Six in the 2008 V-League Draft behind Moon Sung-min. Shin subsequently became a starting middle blocker for the team in his rookie season.

Shin led the V-League in blocks per set in three consecutive seasons (2010–11, 2011–12 and 2012–13) before he was traded to the Hyundai Capital Skywalkers in 2014.

In the 2016–17 season, Shin won his first championship, leading the Skywalkers to their third V-League title. He was named Best Middle Blocker of the season as well.

=== National team ===
Shin first garnered attention in 2004 when he won the gold medal at the 2004 Asian Junior Championship as part of the South Korean junior national team.

While attending Kyonggi University in 2005, Shin got called-up to the South Korean national under-21 team for the 2005 World Junior (U21) Championship, where South Korea finished in sixth place.

In May 2007 Shin first joined the South Korean senior national team to compete in the 2007 FIVB World League, where South Korea finished ninth for its best result since 1995. In November 2007 Shin also took part in the 2007 FIVB World Cup as part of the national team.

At the inaugural AVC Cup, Shin played as the starting middle blocker in all six matches and helped Team Korea to the gold medal match, where they lost to Asia No. 1 Iran in full sets.

Shin was part of the South Korean national team that won the 2014 AVC Cup when the team defeated India 3-0 in the final match.

== Individual awards ==
=== Club ===
- 2010 V-League - Rookie of the Year
- 2017 V-League - Best Middle Blocker

=== National team ===
- 2019 Asian Championship – Best Middle Blocker
