= Shin Sun-ho =

South Korean volleyball player (born 1978)

Personal information
- Nationality: South Korean
- Born: 28 May 1978 (age 48)

Sport
- Sport: Volleyball

Shin Sun-ho (born 28 May 1978) is a South Korean volleyball player. He competed in the men's tournament at the 2000 Summer Olympics.
