= Choi Tae-woong =

South Korean volleyball player (born 1976)

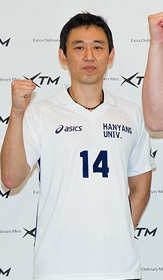
- Choi Tae-woong in 2011

Personal information
- Nationality: South Korean
- Born: 9 April 1976 (age 49)

Sport
- Sport: Volleyball

Choi Tae-woong (born 9 April 1976) is a South Korean volleyball player. He competed in the men's tournament at the 2000 Summer Olympics.
