= Song Hui-chae =

South Korean volleyball player (born 1992)

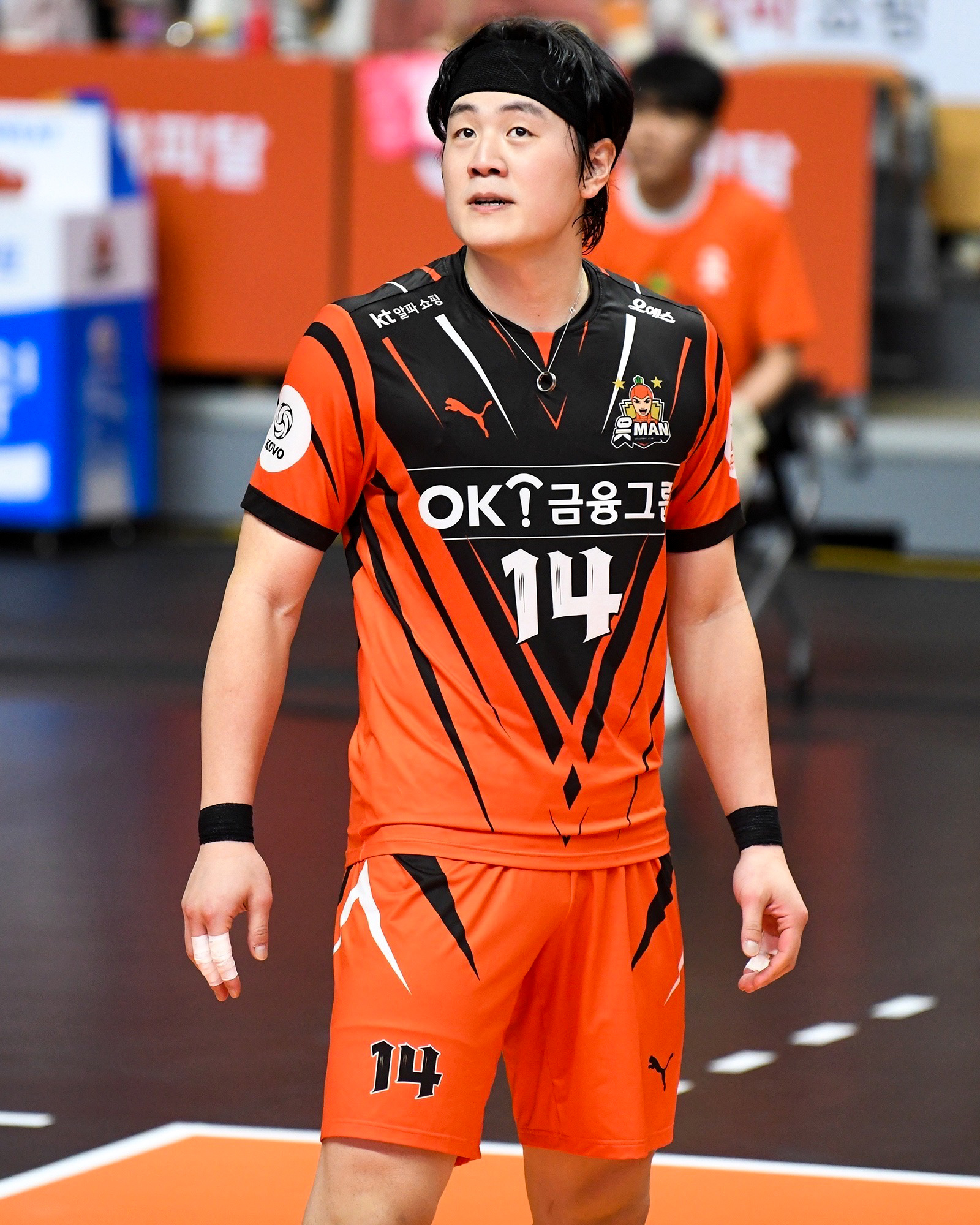
- Song in 2024

Personal information
- Nationality: South Korean
- Born: 29 April 1992 (age 34)
- Height: 1.92 m (6 ft 3 1/2 in)
- Weight: 84 kg (185 lb)
- Spike: 305 cm (120 in)
- Block: 295 cm (116 in)

Volleyball information
- Position: Outside hitter
- Current club: Seoul Woori Card WooriWON
- Number: 12

Career
Years	Teams
2013–2018; 2018–2020; 2020–	OK Savings Bank; Daejeon Samsung Fire Bluefangs; Seoul Woori Card WooriWON

National team
2012–	South Korea

- Song Hui-chae
- Hangul: 송희채
- RR: Song Huichae
- MR: Song Hŭich'ae

Song Hui-chae (Korean: 송희채; born 29 April 1992) is a South Korean volleyball player who plays as an outside hitter for Seoul Woori Card WooriWON in the South Korean V-League. Song made his first appearance for the South Korean national team in 2012 and played all of the team's six matches at the 2012 Asian Men's Cup Volleyball Championship, where the team finished in fifth place. In 2013, he also completed in the Summer Universiade and East Asian Games as a member of the collegiate national team.
