= Lee Min-gyu =

South Korean volleyball player (born 1992)

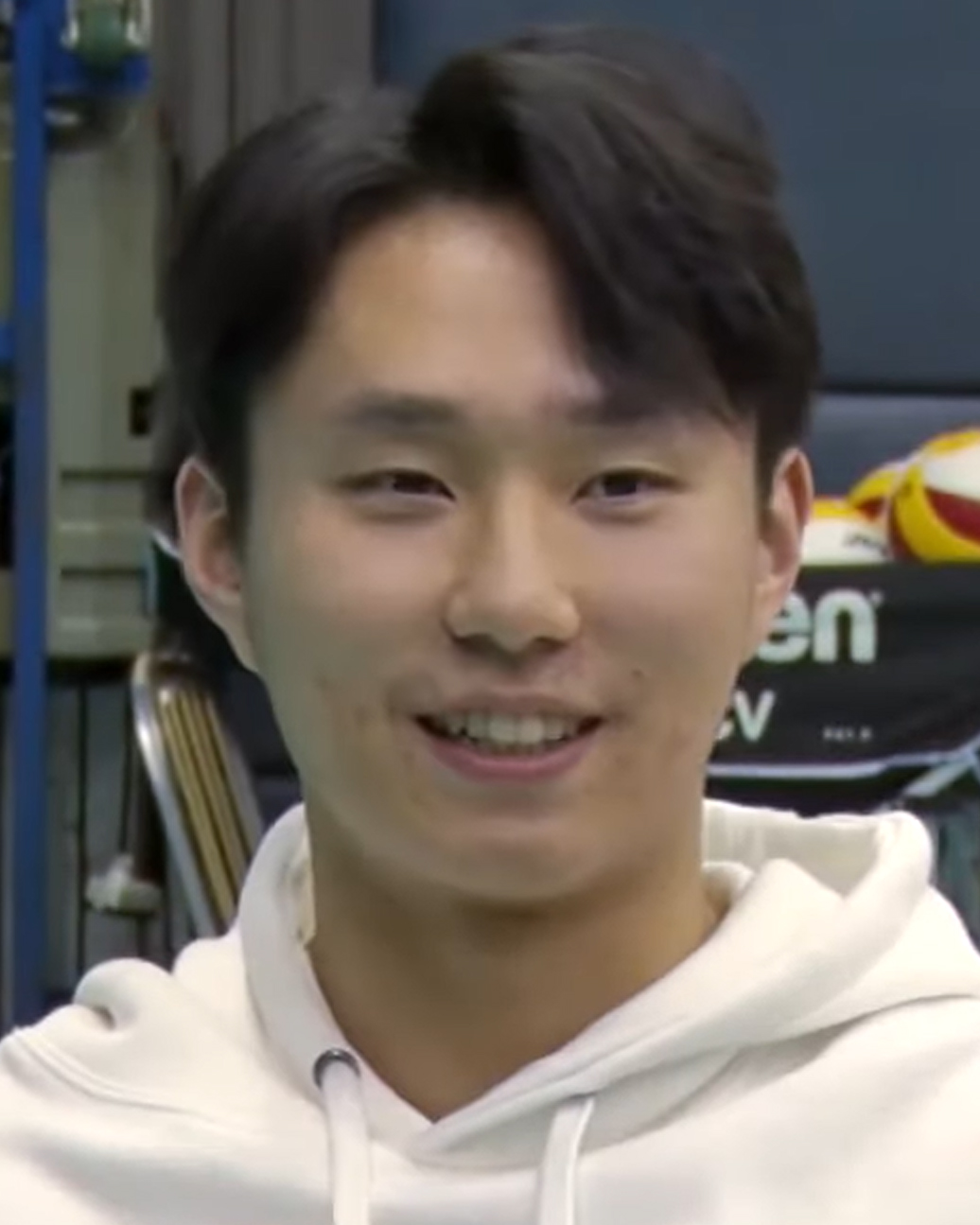
- Lee in 2020

Personal information
- Nationality: South Korean
- Born: 3 December 1992 (age 33); Bucheon, Gyeonggi Province, South Korea
- Height: 1.94 m (6 ft 4 1/2 in)
- Weight: 78 kg (172 lb)
- Spike: 305 cm (120 in)
- Block: 295 cm (116 in)

Volleyball information
- Position: Setter
- Current club: (South Korea) Ansan OK Savings Bank
- Number: 6

Career
Years	Teams
2013–	(South Korea) Ansan OK Savings Bank

National team
2012–	South Korea
Honours
Representing South Korea
Asian Games
Silver medal – second place	2018 Jakarta
Bronze medal – third place	2014 Incheon
Asian Championship
Silver medal – second place	2013 Dubai
AVC Cup
Gold medal – first place	2014 Almaty

- Lee Min-gyu
- Hangul: 이민규
- RR: I Mingyu
- MR: I Min'gyu

Lee Min-gyu (Korean: 이민규; born 3 December 1992) is a volleyball player from South Korea. He currently plays as a setter for the Ansan OK Savings Bank. Lee made his first appearance for the South Korean national team in 2012 and played all of the team's six matches at the 2012 Asian Men's Cup Volleyball Championship, where the team finished in fifth place. In 2013, he also completed in the Summer Universiade as a member of the collegiate national team. Since the 2013 FIVB World League, Lee has been a regular member of the South Korean national team.
