= Heo Su-bong =

South Korean volleyball player (born 1998)

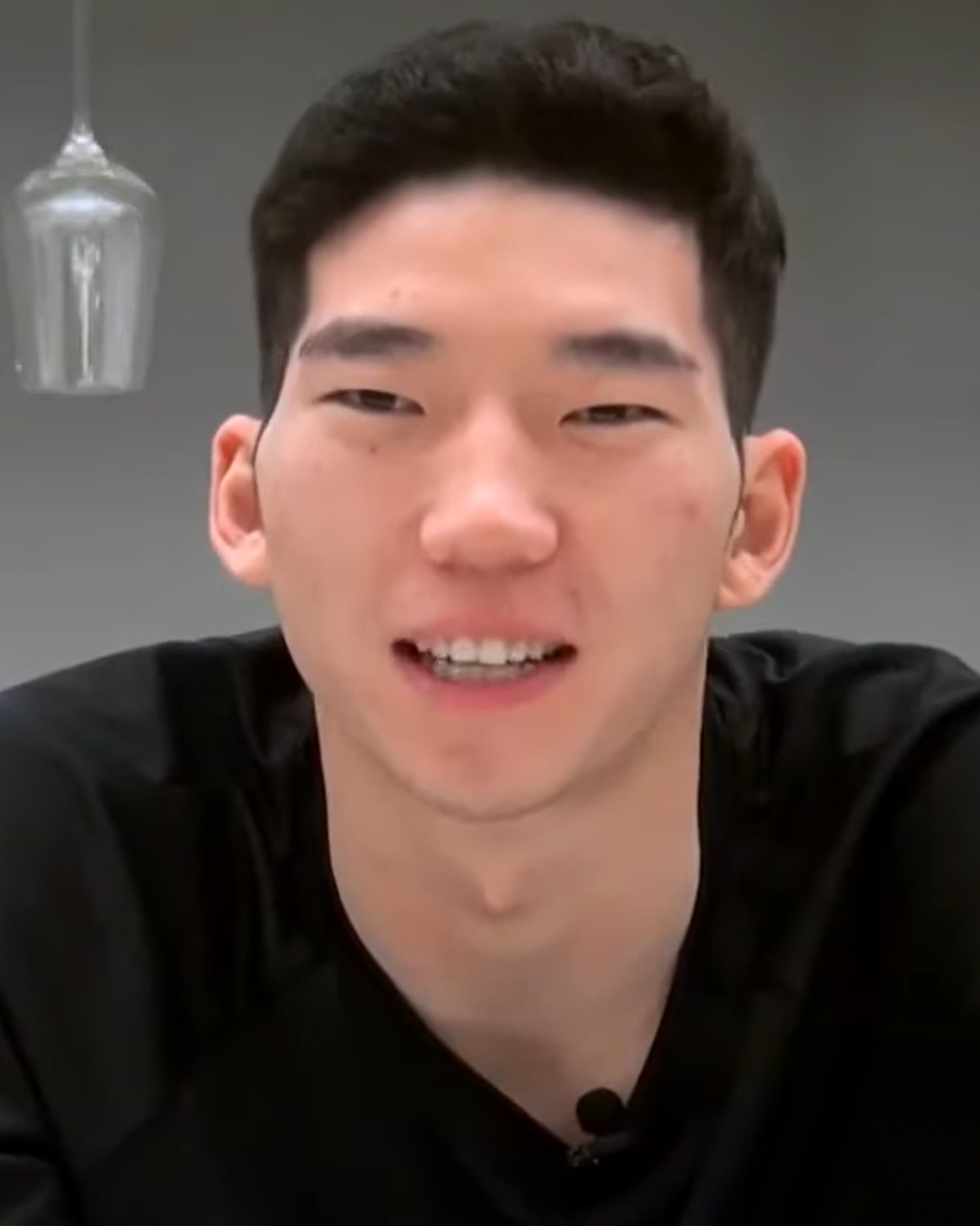
- Heo in 2020

Personal information
- Nationality: South Korean
- Born: 7 April 1998 (age 28); Ulsan, South Korea
- Height: 1.97 m (6 ft 6 in)
- Weight: 75 kg (165 lb)

Volleyball information
- Position: Outside hitter
- Current club: Cheonan Hyundai Skywalkers
- Number: 7

Career
Years	Teams
2016; 2016-	(South Korea) Incheon Korean Air Jumbos (South Korea) Cheonan Hyundai Skywalkers

National team
2018-	South Korea

Heo Su-bong (Korean: 허수봉; born 7 April 1998 in Ulsan) is a South Korean male volleyball player. He was the first high school player to be drafted in the first round in 2016 to Incheon Korean Air Jumbos before being traded to Cheonan Hyundai Capital Skywalkers.

He has been part of the South Korea men's national volleyball team since 2019.
