= Han Sun-soo =

South Korean volleyball player (born 1985)

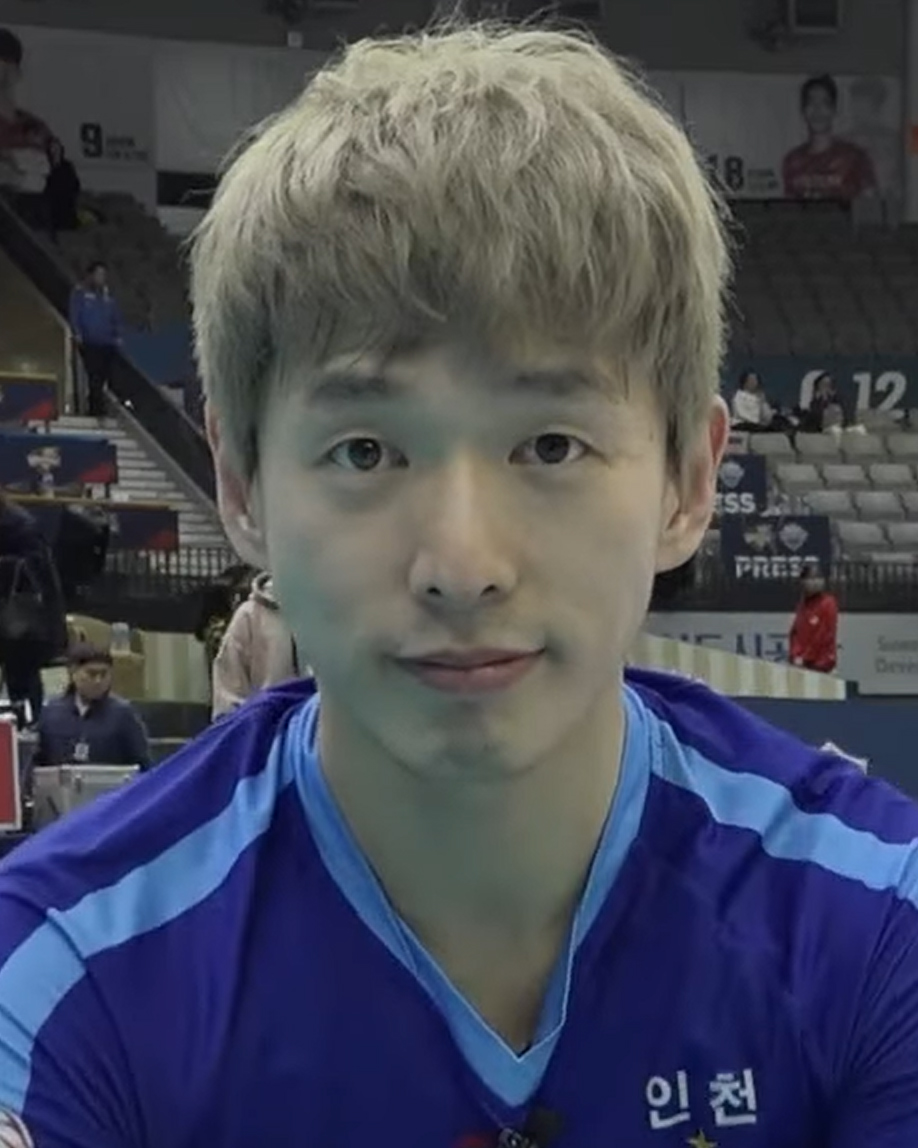
- Han in 2019

Personal information
- Full name: Han Sun-soo (한선수)
- Born: 16 December 1985 (age 40); Bucheon, South Korea
- Height: 1.89 m (6 ft 2 1/2 in)
- Weight: 80 kg (176 lb)
- Spike: 310 cm (10 ft 2 in)
- Block: 297 cm (9 ft 9 in)
- Education: Hanyang University

Volleyball information
- Position: Setter
- Current club: Incheon Korean Air Jumbos
- Number: 2

Career
Years	Teams
2007-	(South Korea) Korean Air Jumbos

National team
2009-	South Korea
Honours
Asian Games
Silver medal – second place	2018 Jakarta
Bronze medal – third place	2010 Guangzhou
Bronze medal – third place	2014 Incheon
Asian Championship
Silver medal – second place	2013 Dubai
Bronze medal – third place	2009 Manila
Bronze medal – third place	2011 Tehran
AVC Cup
Gold medal – first place	2014 Almaty

Han Sun-soo (Korean: 한선수; born December 16, 1985, in Bucheon, Gyeonggi Province) is a volleyball player from South Korea. He currently plays the setter position for the Incheon Korean Air Jumbos in the V-League.

== Career ==
=== Clubs ===
After playing college volleyball at Hanyang University, Han was selected sixth overall by the Korean Air Jumbos in the 2007 V-League Draft. Before the draft, You Kwang-woo of Inha University and Han were widely considered the two best setters available in the 2007 draft, and scouts and analysts debated who should be selected first. While most deemed You the more experienced setter and the safer pick, many favored Han's taller stature and greater setting speed. Eventually, You was drafted second by the Samsung Bluefangs and Han sixth by the Korean Air Jumbos.

After having a mediocre rookie season as a backup, Han was escalated to the starting setter for the Jumbos in 2008–09 season, racking up 1,181 total assists and averaging 10.74 per set.

Throughout the V-League career, Han was named Best Setter three times, and set the Jumbos to the V-League regular season champions twice, in 2010–11 and 2016–17.

=== National team ===
In 2009 Han first got called up to the South Korean senior national team for the 2009 Asian Championship, where he was named Best Setter and his team won the bronze medal.

== Individual awards ==
=== Club ===
- 2010 V-League - Best Setter
- 2011 V-League - Best Setter
- 2016 V-League - Best Setter

=== National team ===
- 2009 Asian Championship - Best Setter
- 2014 AVC Cup - Best Setter
