= Jeong Min-su =

South Korean volleyball player (born 1991)

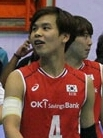
- Jeong with the Korea national team in 2015

Personal information
- Nationality: South Korean
- Born: 5 October 1991 (age 35); Hadong, South Gyeongsang Province, South Korea
- Height: 1.78 m (5 ft 10 in)
- Weight: 75 kg (165 lb)
- Spike: 270 cm (106 in)
- Block: 250 cm (98 in)

Volleyball information
- Number: 19

Career
Years	Teams
2013–2018; 2018–	(South Korea) Woori Card Hansae (South Korea) KB Insurance Stars

National team
2014–	South Korea

Jeong Min-su (Korean: 정민수; born 5 October 1991) is a South Korean male volleyball player. He was part of the South Korea men's national volleyball team at the 2014 FIVB Volleyball Men's World Championship in Poland. He played for Woori Card Hansae.

== Clubs ==
- Woori Card Hansae (2014–2018)
- KB Insurance Stars (2018–)
