= Choi Min-ho (volleyball) =

South Korean volleyball player (born 1988)

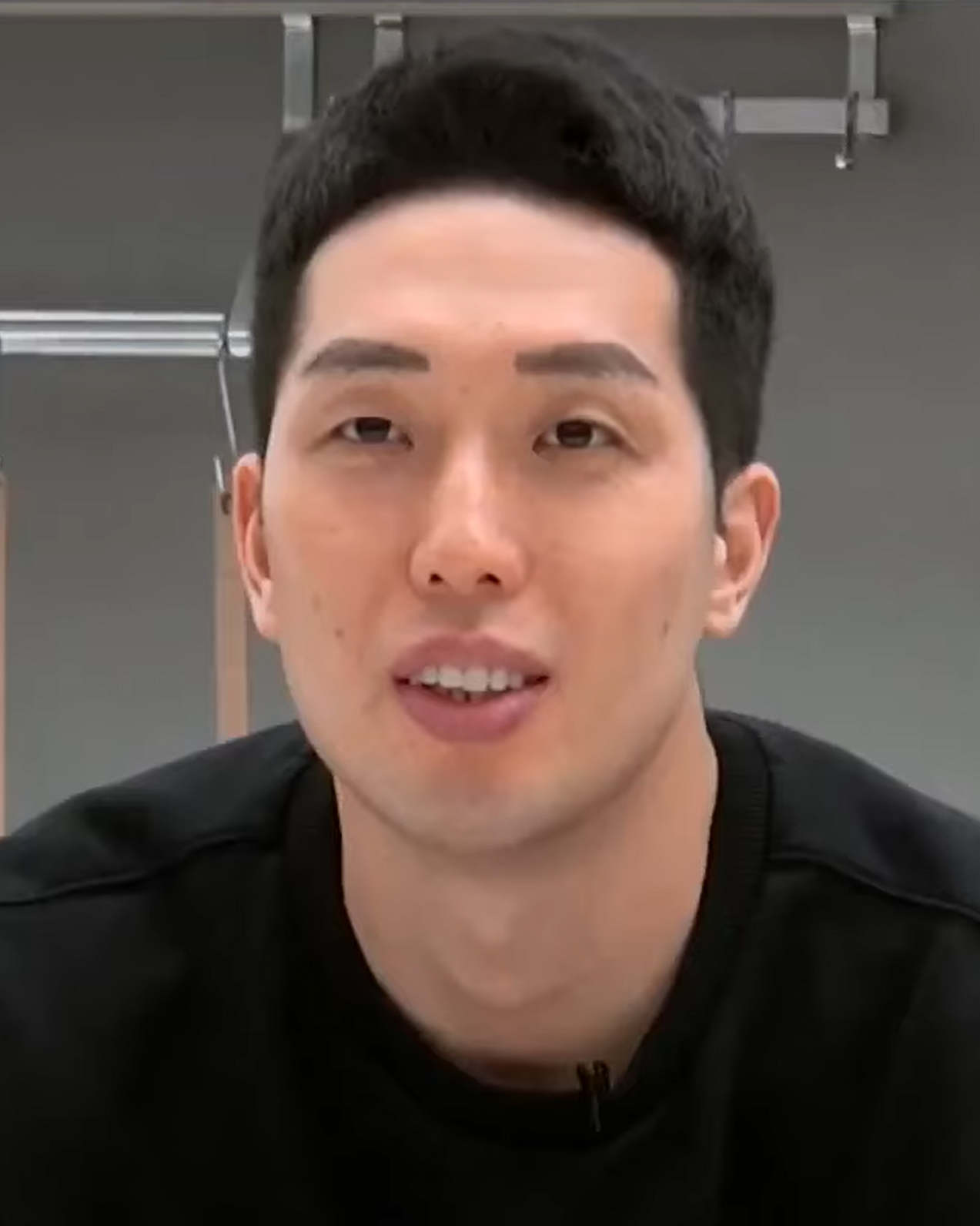
- Choi in 2020

Personal information
- Nationality: South Korean
- Born: 28 April 1988 (age 38); Daegu, South Korea
- Height: 1.98 m (6 ft 6 in)
- Weight: 86 kg (190 lb)
- Spike: 330 cm (130 in)
- Block: 312 cm (123 in)

Volleyball information
- Number: 11

Career
Years	Teams
2011–	(South Korea) Hyundai Capital Skywalkers

National team
2014	South Korea

- Choi Min-ho
- Hangul: 최민호
- RR: Choe Minho
- MR: Ch'oe Minho

Choi Min-ho (Korean: 최민호; born 28 April 1988) is a South Korean volleyball player. He was part of the South Korea men's national volleyball team at the 2014 FIVB Volleyball Men's World Championship in Poland. He played for Hyundai Capital Skywalkers.

== Clubs ==
- Hyundai Capital Skywalkers (2014)
