= Park Ki-won =

South Korean volleyball player (born 1951)

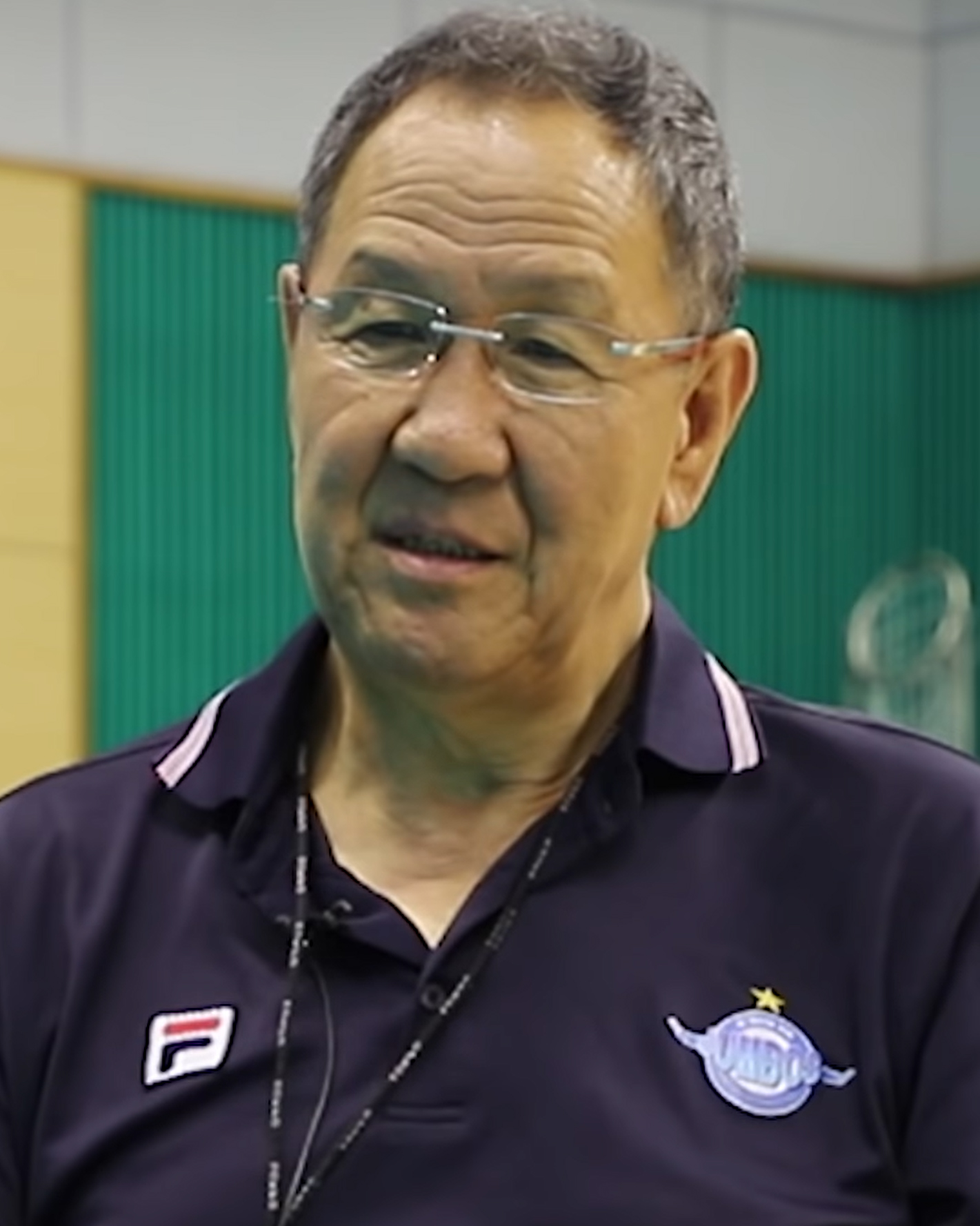
Park in 2019

Park Ki-Won (born 25 August 1951) is a South Korean former volleyball player who competed in the 1972 Summer Olympics and in the 1976 Summer Olympics. He played for Korea from 1972–78, competing at the 1972 and 1976 Olympic Games. Park won a gold medal at the 1978 Asian Games in Thailand and was a member of the Korean team that finished fourth at the 1978 World Championship in Italy. Highlights of his coaching include taking Iran's men's team to a silver medal at the 2002 Asian Games and a bronze at the following year's Asian Championship. In 2013 he led the Korean men's team to a silver medal at the Asian Championship and Thai men’s team to a gold medal AVC Challenge Cup Men 2023, a gold medal SEA games 2025.
