= Volleyball at the 2003 Summer Universiade =

Volleyball at the XXII Summer Universiade
- Venue: various

Volleyball events were contested at the 2003 Summer Universiade in Daegu, South Korea.

Event	Gold	Silver	Bronze
Men's volleyball	South Korea (KOR)	Japan (JPN)	United States (USA)
Women's volleyball	China (CHN)	Chinese Taipei (TPE)	Russia (RUS)
