= 2018 FIVB Men's Volleyball Nations League squads =

This article shows the roster of all participating teams at the 2018 FIVB Men's Volleyball Nations League. The 16 national teams involved in the tournament were required to register a squad of 21 players, which every week's 14-player roster must be selected from. Each country must declare its 14-player roster two days before the start of each week's round-robin competition.

== Argentina ==
The following is the Argentina roster in the 2018 Men's VNL.

Head coach: Julio Velasco

No.	Name	Date of birth	Height	Weight	Spike	Block	2017–18 club
1	Matías Sánchez	20 September 1996	1.73 m (5 ft 8 in)	67 kg (148 lb)	306 cm (120 in)	290 cm (110 in)	(Argentina) Bolívar
2	Lisandro Zanotti	4 October 1990	1.95 m (6 ft 5 in)	88 kg (194 lb)	336 cm (132 in)	315 cm (124 in)	(Argentina) Lomas
3	Jan Martínez Franchi	28 January 1998	1.90 m (6 ft 3 in)	85 kg (187 lb)	333 cm (131 in)	316 cm (124 in)	(Argentina) Buenos Aires
4	Maximiliano Cavanna	2 July 1988	1.88 m (6 ft 2 in)	81 kg (179 lb)	333 cm (131 in)	312 cm (123 in)	(Argentina) UPCN San Juan
5	Ignacio Fernández	7 June 1994	1.77 m (5 ft 10 in)	73 kg (161 lb)	310 cm (120 in)	300 cm (120 in)	(Argentina) Buenos Aires
6	Cristian Poglajen	14 July 1989	1.95 m (6 ft 5 in)	94 kg (207 lb)	342 cm (135 in)	322 cm (127 in)	(Brazil) Montes Claros
7	Facundo Conte	25 August 1989	1.97 m (6 ft 6 in)	88 kg (194 lb)	354 cm (139 in)	334 cm (131 in)	(China) Shanghai
8	Agustín Loser	12 October 1997	1.93 m (6 ft 4 in)	77 kg (170 lb)	335 cm (132 in)	310 cm (120 in)	(Argentina) Buenos Aires
11	Sebastián Solé	12 June 1991	2.00 m (6 ft 7 in)	94 kg (207 lb)	362 cm (143 in)	342 cm (135 in)	(Brazil) Taubaté
12	Bruno Lima	4 February 1996	1.98 m (6 ft 6 in)	87 kg (192 lb)	345 cm (136 in)	320 cm (130 in)	(Argentina) Bolívar
13	Ezequiel Palacios	2 October 1992	1.98 m (6 ft 6 in)	95 kg (209 lb)	345 cm (136 in)	325 cm (128 in)	(Argentina) La Unión de Formosa
14	Pablo Crer	12 June 1989	2.02 m (6 ft 8 in)	85 kg (187 lb)	357 cm (141 in)	337 cm (133 in)	(Argentina) Bolívar
15	Luciano De Cecco (c)	2 June 1988	1.91 m (6 ft 3 in)	98 kg (216 lb)	332 cm (131 in)	315 cm (124 in)	(Italy) Perugia
16	Santiago Danani	12 December 1995	1.76 m (5 ft 9 in)	77 kg (170 lb)	324 cm (128 in)	309 cm (122 in)	(Argentina) Club de Amigos
17	Tomás López	12 September 1994	1.86 m (6 ft 1 in)	79 kg (174 lb)	328 cm (129 in)	290 cm (110 in)	(Argentina) Rosario Sonder
18	Martín Ramos	26 August 1991	1.97 m (6 ft 6 in)	94 kg (207 lb)	348 cm (137 in)	328 cm (129 in)	(Argentina) UPCN San Juan
19	Franco Massimino	23 May 1988	1.77 m (5 ft 10 in)	66 kg (146 lb)	310 cm (120 in)	297 cm (117 in)	(Argentina) Lomas
20	Joaquin Gallego	21 November 1996	2.04 m (6 ft 8 in)	102 kg (225 lb)	343 cm (135 in)	323 cm (127 in)	(Argentina) Bolívar
21	Gaspar Bitar	19 November 1995	1.83 m (6 ft 0 in)	71 kg (157 lb)	326 cm (128 in)	312 cm (123 in)	(Argentina) Club Italiano
22	Gastón Fernández	4 August 1995	2.03 m (6 ft 8 in)	101 kg (223 lb)	339 cm (133 in)	317 cm (125 in)	(Argentina) Buenos Aires
23	Alejandro Toro	20 July 1989	1.90 m (6 ft 3 in)	83 kg (183 lb)	336 cm (132 in)	320 cm (130 in)	(Argentina) Lomas

== Australia ==
The following is the Australia roster in the 2018 Men's VNL.

Head coach: Mark Lebedew

No.	Name	Date of birth	Height	Weight	Spike	Block	2017–18 club
1	Beau Graham	17 April 1994	2.02 m (6 ft 8 in)	86 kg (190 lb)	351 cm (138 in)	332 cm (131 in)	(France) Saint-Quentin
2	Arshdeep Dosanjh	30 July 1996	2.05 m (6 ft 9 in)	85 kg (187 lb)	347 cm (137 in)	335 cm (132 in)	(Switzerland) Chênois Genève
4	Paul Sanderson	7 January 1986	1.95 m (6 ft 5 in)	94 kg (207 lb)	348 cm (137 in)	335 cm (132 in)	(Tunisia) Sahel
5	Travis Passier	26 April 1989	2.08 m (6 ft 10 in)	100 kg (220 lb)	355 cm (140 in)	340 cm (130 in)	(Czech Republic) Příbram
6	Gerrard Lipscombe	4 June 1993	1.88 m (6 ft 2 in)	85 kg (187 lb)	339 cm (133 in)	332 cm (131 in)	(Germany) Solingen
7	Harrison Peacock	31 January 1991	1.92 m (6 ft 4 in)	87 kg (192 lb)	353 cm (139 in)	339 cm (133 in)	(Poland) Bielsko-Biała
8	Trent O'Dea	11 May 1994	2.01 m (6 ft 7 in)	98 kg (216 lb)	354 cm (139 in)	344 cm (135 in)	(Finland) Raision
9	Max Staples	27 July 1994	1.94 m (6 ft 4 in)	83 kg (183 lb)	358 cm (141 in)	345 cm (136 in)	(Finland) Hurrikaani Loimaa
10	Jordan Richards	25 September 1993	1.93 m (6 ft 4 in)	80 kg (180 lb)	354 cm (139 in)	342 cm (135 in)	(Italy) Grottazzolina
11	Luke Perry	20 November 1995	1.80 m (5 ft 11 in)	75 kg (165 lb)	331 cm (130 in)	315 cm (124 in)	(Germany) Berlin Recycling Volleys
12	Nehemiah Mote	21 June 1993	2.04 m (6 ft 8 in)	91 kg (201 lb)	362 cm (143 in)	354 cm (139 in)	(Switzerland) Amriswil
13	Samuel Walker	19 February 1995	2.08 m (6 ft 10 in)	90 kg (200 lb)	350 cm (140 in)	337 cm (133 in)	(Estonia) Tartu
14	Simon Hone	24 April 1993	1.97 m (6 ft 6 in)	90 kg (200 lb)	345 cm (136 in)	330 cm (130 in)	(Finland) Kokkolan Tiikerit
15	Luke Smith	30 August 1990	2.04 m (6 ft 8 in)	95 kg (209 lb)	360 cm (140 in)	342 cm (135 in)	(Portugal) Sporting
16	Thomas Douglas-Powell	16 September 1992	1.94 m (6 ft 4 in)	82 kg (181 lb)	356 cm (140 in)	332 cm (131 in)	(Finland) Hurrikaani Loimaa
17	Paul Carroll (c)	16 May 1986	2.07 m (6 ft 9 in)	100 kg (220 lb)	354 cm (139 in)	340 cm (130 in)	(Germany) Berlin Recycling Volleys
18	Lincoln Williams	6 October 1993	2.00 m (6 ft 7 in)	104 kg (229 lb)	353 cm (139 in)	330 cm (130 in)	(Germany) United Rhein-Main
20	Thomas Hodges	4 July 1994	1.97 m (6 ft 6 in)	95 kg (209 lb)	350 cm (140 in)	338 cm (133 in)	(Italy) Lagonegro
22	Curtis Stockton	22 April 1993	1.98 m (6 ft 6 in)	94 kg (207 lb)	351 cm (138 in)	330 cm (130 in)	(Estonia) Tartu
23	James Weir	20 July 1995	2.04 m (6 ft 8 in)	95 kg (209 lb)	348 cm (137 in)	342 cm (135 in)	(Australia) Brandon University
25	Jordan Colotti	7 May 1996	1.88 m (6 ft 2 in)	82 kg (181 lb)	335 cm (132 in)	325 cm (128 in)	Free agent

== Brazil ==
The following is the Brazil roster in the 2018 Men's VNL.

Head coach: Renan Dal Zotto

No.	Name	Date of birth	Height	Weight	Spike	Block	2017–18 club
1	Bruno Rezende (c)	2 July 1986	1.90 m (6 ft 3 in)	76 kg (168 lb)	323 cm (127 in)	302 cm (119 in)	(Italy) Modena
2	Isac Santos	13 December 1990	2.08 m (6 ft 10 in)	99 kg (218 lb)	339 cm (133 in)	306 cm (120 in)	(Brazil) Cruzeiro
3	Éder Carbonera	19 October 1983	2.05 m (6 ft 9 in)	107 kg (236 lb)	360 cm (140 in)	330 cm (130 in)	(Italy) Trentino
4	Leonardo Nascimento	16 March 1995	1.99 m (6 ft 6 in)	87 kg (192 lb)	338 cm (133 in)	316 cm (124 in)	(Brazil) Sada Cruzeiro
5	Lucas Lóh	18 January 1991	1.95 m (6 ft 5 in)	83 kg (183 lb)	336 cm (132 in)	320 cm (130 in)	(Turkey) Halkbank Ankara
6	Thiago Veloso	15 August 1993	1.84 m (6 ft 0 in)	77 kg (170 lb)	305 cm (120 in)	298 cm (117 in)	(Brazil) Rio de Janeiro
7	William Arjona	31 July 1979	1.86 m (6 ft 1 in)	78 kg (172 lb)	300 cm (120 in)	295 cm (116 in)	(Brazil) SESI São Paulo
8	Wallace de Souza	26 June 1987	1.98 m (6 ft 6 in)	87 kg (192 lb)	344 cm (135 in)	318 cm (125 in)	(Brazil) Taubaté
9	Thales Hoss	26 April 1989	1.90 m (6 ft 3 in)	74 kg (163 lb)	320 cm (130 in)	303 cm (119 in)	(Brazil) Taubaté
10	Otávio Pinto	27 February 1991	2.00 m (6 ft 7 in)	85 kg (187 lb)	347 cm (137 in)	319 cm (126 in)	(Brazil) Taubaté
11	Rodrigo Leão	5 June 1996	1.97 m (6 ft 6 in)	85 kg (187 lb)	331 cm (130 in)	316 cm (124 in)	(Brazil) Sada Cruzeiro
12	Luiz Felipe Fonteles	19 June 1984	1.98 m (6 ft 6 in)	100 kg (220 lb)	351 cm (138 in)	340 cm (130 in)	(Brazil) SESI São Paulo
13	Maurício Souza	29 September 1988	2.09 m (6 ft 10 in)	93 kg (205 lb)	344 cm (135 in)	323 cm (127 in)	(Brazil) Rio de Janeiro
14	Douglas Souza	20 August 1995	1.99 m (6 ft 6 in)	75 kg (165 lb)	338 cm (133 in)	317 cm (125 in)	(Brazil) SESI São Paulo
15	Murilo Endres	3 May 1981	1.90 m (6 ft 3 in)	76 kg (168 lb)	343 cm (135 in)	319 cm (126 in)	(Brazil) SESI São Paulo
16	Lucas Saatkamp	6 March 1986	2.09 m (6 ft 10 in)	101 kg (223 lb)	340 cm (130 in)	321 cm (126 in)	(Brazil) SESI São Paulo
17	Evandro Guerra	27 December 1981	2.07 m (6 ft 9 in)	106 kg (234 lb)	359 cm (141 in)	332 cm (131 in)	(Brazil) Sada Cruzeiro
19	Maurício Borges	4 February 1989	1.99 m (6 ft 6 in)	99 kg (218 lb)	335 cm (132 in)	315 cm (124 in)	(Brazil) Rio de Janeiro
21	Alan Souza	21 March 1994	2.02 m (6 ft 8 in)	98 kg (216 lb)	336 cm (132 in)	320 cm (130 in)	(Brazil) SESI São Paulo
22	Tiago Brendle	21 October 1985	1.88 m (6 ft 2 in)	83 kg (183 lb)	315 cm (124 in)	300 cm (120 in)	(Brazil) Rio de Janeiro
25	Victor Cardoso	22 March 1999	1.99 m (6 ft 6 in)	86 kg (190 lb)	350 cm (140 in)	325 cm (128 in)	(Brazil) SESI São Paulo

== Bulgaria ==
The following is the Bulgaria roster in the 2018 Men's VNL.

Head coach: Plamen Konstantinov

No.	Name	Date of birth	Height	Weight	Spike	Block	2017–18 club
1	Georgi Bratoev	21 October 1987	2.03 m (6 ft 8 in)	98 kg (216 lb)	340 cm (130 in)	325 cm (128 in)	(Bulgaria) Neftohimik
2	Iliya Petkov	10 October 1996	2.01 m (6 ft 7 in)	88 kg (194 lb)	350 cm (140 in)	337 cm (133 in)	(Bulgaria) Neftohimik
3	Dobromir Dimitrov	7 July 1991	1.98 m (6 ft 6 in)	84 kg (185 lb)	345 cm (136 in)	335 cm (132 in)	(Romania) Zalău
4	Dimitar Marinkov	9 September 1993	1.96 m (6 ft 5 in)	84 kg (185 lb)	328 cm (129 in)	316 cm (124 in)	(Bulgaria) Dobrudzha 07
5	Svetoslav Gotsev	31 August 1990	2.05 m (6 ft 9 in)	97 kg (214 lb)	358 cm (141 in)	335 cm (132 in)	(France) Tours
6	Rozalin Penchev	11 December 1994	1.97 m (6 ft 6 in)	79 kg (174 lb)	337 cm (133 in)	327 cm (129 in)	(Argentina) Bolívar
7	Nikolay Uchikov	13 April 1986	2.07 m (6 ft 9 in)	110 kg (240 lb)	355 cm (140 in)	330 cm (130 in)	(Greece) PAOK
8	Todor Skrimov	9 January 1990	1.91 m (6 ft 3 in)	87 kg (192 lb)	348 cm (137 in)	330 cm (130 in)	(Italy) Loreto
9	Georgi Seganov	10 June 1993	1.98 m (6 ft 6 in)	83 kg (183 lb)	355 cm (140 in)	325 cm (128 in)	(Italy) Sora
10	Valentin Bratoev	21 October 1987	2.03 m (6 ft 8 in)	92 kg (203 lb)	347 cm (137 in)	337 cm (133 in)	(Bulgaria) Neftohimik
11	Boyan Yordanov	12 March 1983	1.97 m (6 ft 6 in)	86 kg (190 lb)	358 cm (141 in)	335 cm (132 in)	(Greece) Foinikas Syros
12	Viktor Yosifov (c)	16 October 1985	2.04 m (6 ft 8 in)	100 kg (220 lb)	350 cm (140 in)	340 cm (130 in)	(Italy) Piacenza
13	Teodor Salparov	16 August 1982	1.87 m (6 ft 2 in)	77 kg (170 lb)	320 cm (130 in)	305 cm (120 in)	(Bulgaria) Neftohimik
16	Vladislav Ivanov	14 March 1987	1.88 m (6 ft 2 in)	80 kg (180 lb)	320 cm (130 in)	310 cm (120 in)	(France) Cannes
17	Nikolay Penchev	22 May 1992	1.97 m (6 ft 6 in)	87 kg (192 lb)	341 cm (134 in)	335 cm (132 in)	(Poland) Skra Bełchatów
18	Nikolay Nikolov	29 July 1986	2.06 m (6 ft 9 in)	97 kg (214 lb)	350 cm (140 in)	332 cm (131 in)	(Bulgaria) Neftohimik
20	Aleks Grozdanov	28 March 1998	2.06 m (6 ft 9 in)	86 kg (190 lb)	355 cm (140 in)	334 cm (131 in)	(Italy) Verona
21	Petar Karakashev	11 February 1991	1.84 m (6 ft 0 in)	77 kg (170 lb)	326 cm (128 in)	308 cm (121 in)	(Bulgaria) Pirin Blagoevgrad
23	Plamen Shekerdzhiev	21 May 1998	1.98 m (6 ft 6 in)	83 kg (183 lb)	345 cm (136 in)	328 cm (129 in)	(Bulgaria) CSKA Sofia
25	Velizar Chernokozhev	23 April 1995	2.12 m (6 ft 11 in)	108 kg (238 lb)	350 cm (140 in)	335 cm (132 in)	(Turkey) Halkbank Ankara
26	Krasimir Georgiev	13 February 1995	2.03 m (6 ft 8 in)	83 kg (183 lb)	346 cm (136 in)	333 cm (131 in)	(Italy) Ravenna

== Canada ==
The following is the Canada roster in the 2018 Men's VNL.

Head coach: Stéphane Antiga

No.	Name	Date of birth	Height	Weight	Spike	Block	2017–18 club
1	TJ Sanders (c)	14 December 1991	1.91 m (6 ft 3 in)	81 kg (179 lb)	326 cm (128 in)	308 cm (121 in)	(Poland) Gdańsk
2	John Gordon Perrin	17 August 1989	2.01 m (6 ft 7 in)	95 kg (209 lb)	353 cm (139 in)	329 cm (130 in)	(China) Beijing
3	Steven Marshall	23 November 1989	1.93 m (6 ft 4 in)	87 kg (192 lb)	350 cm (140 in)	322 cm (127 in)	(Germany) Berlin Recycling Volleys
4	Nicholas Hoag	19 August 1992	2.00 m (6 ft 7 in)	91 kg (201 lb)	342 cm (135 in)	322 cm (127 in)	(Italy) Trentino
5	Lucas Van Berkel	29 November 1991	2.10 m (6 ft 11 in)	108 kg (238 lb)	350 cm (140 in)	326 cm (128 in)	(Italy) Spoleto
6	Justin Duff	10 May 1988	2.00 m (6 ft 7 in)	102 kg (225 lb)	370 cm (150 in)	335 cm (132 in)	(Poland) Szczecin
7	Stephen Timothy Maar	6 December 1994	2.01 m (6 ft 7 in)	103 kg (227 lb)	350 cm (140 in)	328 cm (129 in)	(Italy) Verona
8	Jay Blankenau	27 September 1989	1.94 m (6 ft 4 in)	94 kg (207 lb)	334 cm (131 in)	307 cm (121 in)	(Belgium) Maaseik
9	Jason DeRocco	19 September 1989	1.98 m (6 ft 6 in)	94 kg (207 lb)	342 cm (135 in)	318 cm (125 in)	(Poland) Jastrzębski Węgiel
11	Daniel Jansen Van Doorn	21 March 1990	2.07 m (6 ft 9 in)	98 kg (216 lb)	351 cm (138 in)	328 cm (129 in)	(France) Chaumont
12	Gavin Schmitt	27 January 1986	2.08 m (6 ft 10 in)	106 kg (234 lb)	372 cm (146 in)	340 cm (130 in)	(Japan) Toray Arrows
13	Ryley Barnes	11 October 1993	2.00 m (6 ft 7 in)	92 kg (203 lb)	348 cm (137 in)	325 cm (128 in)	(Russia) Ural Ufa
15	Bryan Duquette	15 November 1991	1.91 m (6 ft 3 in)	80 kg (180 lb)	325 cm (128 in)	310 cm (120 in)	(France) Chaumont
16	Ryan Sclater	10 February 1994	2.00 m (6 ft 7 in)	92 kg (203 lb)	347 cm (137 in)	320 cm (130 in)	(Germany) Lüneburg
17	Graham Vigrass	17 June 1989	2.05 m (6 ft 9 in)	97 kg (214 lb)	354 cm (139 in)	330 cm (130 in)	(Germany) Berlin Recycling Volleys
18	Bradley Gunter	5 December 1993	1.98 m (6 ft 6 in)	91 kg (201 lb)	354 cm (139 in)	323 cm (127 in)	(Poland) Gdańsk
19	Blair Bann	26 February 1988	1.84 m (6 ft 0 in)	84 kg (185 lb)	314 cm (124 in)	295 cm (116 in)	(Germany) Powervolleys Düren
20	Arthur Szwarc	30 March 1995	2.07 m (6 ft 9 in)	97 kg (214 lb)	356 cm (140 in)	335 cm (132 in)	(France) Arago de Sète
21	Brett Walsh	12 February 1994	1.95 m (6 ft 5 in)	84 kg (185 lb)	332 cm (131 in)	312 cm (123 in)	(Italy) Monza
23	Danny Demyanenko	13 July 1994	1.94 m (6 ft 4 in)	101 kg (223 lb)	357 cm (141 in)	325 cm (128 in)	(France) Spacer's Toulouse
26	Eric Loeppky	1 August 1998	1.97 m (6 ft 6 in)	89 kg (196 lb)	348 cm (137 in)	325 cm (128 in)	(Canada) Trinity Western Spartans

== China ==
The following is the China roster in the 2018 Men's VNL.

Head coach: Raúl Lozano

No.	Name	Date of birth	Height	Weight	Spike	Block	2017–18 club
1	Li Rui	15 March 1990	2.07 m (6 ft 9 in)	86 kg (190 lb)	350 cm (140 in)	330 cm (130 in)	(China) Henan
2	Jiang Chuan	9 August 1994	2.05 m (6 ft 9 in)	91 kg (201 lb)	365 cm (144 in)	345 cm (136 in)	(China) Beijing
3	Mao Tianyi	2 June 1993	2.00 m (6 ft 7 in)	90 kg (200 lb)	350 cm (140 in)	340 cm (130 in)	(China) Bayi
4	Zhang Chen	28 June 1985	2.00 m (6 ft 7 in)	85 kg (187 lb)	355 cm (140 in)	344 cm (135 in)	(China) Jiangsu
5	Zhang Binglong	11 September 1994	1.97 m (6 ft 6 in)	99 kg (218 lb)	355 cm (140 in)	345 cm (136 in)	(China) Beijing
6	Li Runming	1 March 1990	1.98 m (6 ft 6 in)	90 kg (200 lb)	355 cm (140 in)	345 cm (136 in)	(China) Shandong
7	Zhang Jingyin	20 December 1999	2.07 m (6 ft 9 in)	88 kg (194 lb)	357 cm (141 in)	325 cm (128 in)	(China) Zhejiang
8	Wang Jingyi	7 February 1998	2.02 m (6 ft 8 in)	87 kg (192 lb)	360 cm (140 in)	350 cm (140 in)	(China) Shandong
9	Yu Yaochen	19 August 1995	1.95 m (6 ft 5 in)	78 kg (172 lb)	347 cm (137 in)	338 cm (133 in)	(China) Jiangsu
10	Ji Daoshuai (C)	7 February 1992	1.94 m (6 ft 4 in)	82 kg (181 lb)	355 cm (140 in)	335 cm (132 in)	(China) Shandong
11	Du Haixiang	25 May 1995	1.94 m (6 ft 4 in)	87 kg (192 lb)	348 cm (137 in)	336 cm (132 in)	(China) Sichuan
13	Chen Longhai	29 March 1991	2.00 m (6 ft 7 in)	85 kg (187 lb)	350 cm (140 in)	340 cm (130 in)	(China) Shanghai
15	Tang Chuanhang	4 October 1995	2.02 m (6 ft 8 in)	92 kg (203 lb)	350 cm (140 in)	340 cm (130 in)	(China) Bayi
16	Tong Jiahua	13 December 1992	1.80 m (5 ft 11 in)	76 kg (168 lb)	330 cm (130 in)	320 cm (130 in)	(China) Shanghai
17	Liu Libin	16 February 1995	1.97 m (6 ft 6 in)	90 kg (200 lb)	350 cm (140 in)	342 cm (135 in)	(France) Tourcoing
18	Liu Meng	11 February 1995	1.95 m (6 ft 5 in)	80 kg (180 lb)	340 cm (130 in)	330 cm (130 in)	(China) Shandong
20	Rao Shuhan	23 December 1996	2.05 m (6 ft 9 in)	99 kg (218 lb)	360 cm (140 in)	350 cm (140 in)	(China) Fujian
21	Miao Ruantong	21 May 1995	2.05 m (6 ft 9 in)	88 kg (194 lb)	354 cm (139 in)	345 cm (136 in)	(China) Hubei
24	Zhang Zuyuan	4 May 1997	2.07 m (6 ft 9 in)	87 kg (192 lb)	355 cm (140 in)	350 cm (140 in)	(China) Shandong
25	Chen Jiajie	17 September 1995	1.70 m (5 ft 7 in)	70 kg (150 lb)	325 cm (128 in)	310 cm (120 in)	(China) Guangdong
27	Ma Xiaoteng	19 June 1991	1.80 m (5 ft 11 in)	85 kg (187 lb)	330 cm (130 in)	320 cm (130 in)	(China) Bayi

== France ==
The following is the France roster in the 2018 Men's VNL.

Head coach: Laurent Tillie

No.	Name	Date of birth	Height	Weight	Spike	Block	2017–18 club
1	Jonas Aguenier	28 April 1992	2.02 m (6 ft 8 in)	92 kg (203 lb)	340 cm (130 in)	310 cm (120 in)	(France) Chaumont
2	Jenia Grebennikov	13 August 1990	1.88 m (6 ft 2 in)	85 kg (187 lb)	345 cm (136 in)	330 cm (130 in)	(Italy) Civitanova
3	Luka Bašič	29 January 1995	2.01 m (6 ft 7 in)	77 kg (170 lb)	330 cm (130 in)	302 cm (119 in)	(France) Spacer's Toulouse
4	Jean Patry	27 December 1996	2.07 m (6 ft 9 in)	94 kg (207 lb)	357 cm (141 in)	334 cm (131 in)	(France) Montpellier
5	Raphaël Corre	21 November 1989	1.95 m (6 ft 5 in)	86 kg (190 lb)	335 cm (132 in)	315 cm (124 in)	(France) Cannes
6	Benjamin Toniutti (C)	30 October 1989	1.83 m (6 ft 0 in)	73 kg (161 lb)	320 cm (130 in)	300 cm (120 in)	(Poland) Kędzierzyn-Koźle
7	Kévin Tillie	2 November 1990	2.00 m (6 ft 7 in)	85 kg (187 lb)	345 cm (136 in)	325 cm (128 in)	(China) Beijing
8	Julien Lyneel	15 April 1990	1.92 m (6 ft 4 in)	87 kg (192 lb)	345 cm (136 in)	325 cm (128 in)	(China) Shanghai
9	Earvin N'Gapeth	12 February 1991	1.94 m (6 ft 4 in)	101 kg (223 lb)	358 cm (141 in)	327 cm (129 in)	(Italy) Modena
10	Kévin Le Roux	11 May 1989	2.09 m (6 ft 10 in)	95 kg (209 lb)	365 cm (144 in)	345 cm (136 in)	(France) Rennes
11	Antoine Brizard	22 May 1994	1.96 m (6 ft 5 in)	96 kg (212 lb)	340 cm (130 in)	310 cm (120 in)	(Poland) Warszawa
12	Stéphen Boyer	10 April 1996	1.96 m (6 ft 5 in)	77 kg (170 lb)	355 cm (140 in)	334 cm (131 in)	(France) Chaumont
13	Franck Lafitte	8 March 1989	2.03 m (6 ft 8 in)	94 kg (207 lb)	350 cm (140 in)	330 cm (130 in)	(France) Paris
14	Nicolas Le Goff	15 February 1992	2.06 m (6 ft 9 in)	105 kg (231 lb)	375 cm (148 in)	345 cm (136 in)	(Italy) Latina
15	Jérémie Mouiel	4 May 1995	1.76 m (5 ft 9 in)	52 kg (115 lb)	290 cm (110 in)	260 cm (100 in)	(France) Chaumont
16	Daryl Bultor	17 November 1995	1.97 m (6 ft 6 in)	94 kg (207 lb)	352 cm (139 in)	327 cm (129 in)	(France) Montpellier
17	Trévor Clévenot	28 June 1994	1.99 m (6 ft 6 in)	89 kg (196 lb)	345 cm (136 in)	326 cm (128 in)	(Italy) Piacenza
18	Thibault Rossard	28 August 1993	1.94 m (6 ft 4 in)	85 kg (187 lb)	350 cm (140 in)	320 cm (130 in)	(Poland) Rzeszów
19	Yacine Louati	4 March 1992	1.98 m (6 ft 6 in)	92 kg (203 lb)	345 cm (136 in)	320 cm (130 in)	(France) Chaumont
20	Nicolas Rossard	23 May 1990	1.83 m (6 ft 0 in)	64 kg (141 lb)	315 cm (124 in)	305 cm (120 in)	(France) Paris
21	Barthélémy Chinenyeze	28 February 1998	2.01 m (6 ft 7 in)	81 kg (179 lb)	357 cm (141 in)	332 cm (131 in)	(France) Spacer's Toulouse

== Germany ==
The following is the Germany roster in the 2018 Men's VNL.

Head coach: Andrea Giani

No.	Name	Date of birth	Height	Weight	Spike	Block	2017–18 club
1	Christian Fromm	15 August 1990	2.04 m (6 ft 8 in)	99 kg (218 lb)	350 cm (140 in)	330 cm (130 in)	(Turkey) Arkas
2	Tobias Krick	22 October 1998	2.10 m (6 ft 11 in)	85 kg (187 lb)	350 cm (140 in)	330 cm (130 in)	(Germany) United Rhein-Main
3	Ruben Schott	8 July 1994	1.93 m (6 ft 4 in)	89 kg (196 lb)	326 cm (128 in)	309 cm (122 in)	(Italy) Milano
4	Adam Kocian	1 April 1995	1.92 m (6 ft 4 in)	83 kg (183 lb)	341 cm (134 in)	315 cm (124 in)	(Germany) Lüneburg
5	Moritz Reichert	15 March 1995	1.94 m (6 ft 4 in)	85 kg (187 lb)	336 cm (132 in)	314 cm (124 in)	(France) Tours
6	Denys Kaliberda	24 June 1990	1.93 m (6 ft 4 in)	95 kg (209 lb)	343 cm (135 in)	314 cm (124 in)	(Turkey) Ziraat Bankası Ankara
7	David Sossenheimer	21 June 1996	1.93 m (6 ft 4 in)	85 kg (187 lb)	325 cm (128 in)	313 cm (123 in)	(Germany) Friedrichshafen
8	Marcus Böhme	25 August 1985	2.11 m (6 ft 11 in)	116 kg (256 lb)	360 cm (140 in)	330 cm (130 in)	(Greece) Olympiacos
10	Julian Zenger	26 August 1997	1.90 m (6 ft 3 in)	80 kg (180 lb)	330 cm (130 in)	315 cm (124 in)	(Germany) United Rhein-Main
11	Lukas Kampa (C)	29 November 1986	1.96 m (6 ft 5 in)	90 kg (200 lb)	335 cm (132 in)	320 cm (130 in)	(Poland) Jastrzębski Węgiel
12	Anton Brehme	8 October 1999	1.99 m (6 ft 6 in)	86 kg (190 lb)	329 cm (130 in)	322 cm (127 in)	(Germany) Olympia Berlin
13	Simon Hirsch	3 April 1992	2.04 m (6 ft 8 in)	96 kg (212 lb)	352 cm (139 in)	344 cm (135 in)	(Italy) Monza
14	Moritz Karlitzek	12 August 1996	1.91 m (6 ft 3 in)	91 kg (201 lb)	335 cm (132 in)	310 cm (120 in)	(Germany) United Rhein-Main
15	Noah Baxpöhler	13 August 1993	2.10 m (6 ft 11 in)	85 kg (187 lb)	345 cm (136 in)	325 cm (128 in)	(Germany) Lüneburg
16	Mario Schmidgall	2 May 1998	2.02 m (6 ft 8 in)	78 kg (172 lb)	335 cm (132 in)	321 cm (126 in)	(Germany) Bühl
17	Jan Zimmermann	12 February 1993	1.91 m (6 ft 3 in)	82 kg (181 lb)	340 cm (130 in)	312 cm (123 in)	(France) Poitiers
18	Jakob Günthör	21 September 1995	2.11 m (6 ft 11 in)	96 kg (212 lb)	339 cm (133 in)	320 cm (130 in)	(Germany) Friedrichshafen
19	Daniel Malescha	28 April 1994	2.03 m (6 ft 8 in)	90 kg (200 lb)	330 cm (130 in)	315 cm (124 in)	(Germany) Friedrichshafen
20	Linus Weber	1 November 1998	1.99 m (6 ft 6 in)	85 kg (187 lb)	336 cm (132 in)	321 cm (126 in)	(Germany) Olympia Berlin
21	Ivan Batanov	25 April 2000	1.82 m (6 ft 0 in)	78 kg (172 lb)	325 cm (128 in)	305 cm (120 in)	(Germany) Kriftel
22	Egor Bogachev	6 April 1997	2.03 m (6 ft 8 in)	82 kg (181 lb)	345 cm (136 in)	325 cm (128 in)	(Germany) Berlin Recycling Volleys

== Iran ==
The following is the Iran roster in the 2018 Men's VBL.

Head coach: Igor Kolaković

No.	Name	Date of birth	Height	Weight	Spike	Block	2017–18 club
1	Farhad Salafzoun	6 December 1992	2.00 m (6 ft 7 in)	81 kg (179 lb)	320 cm (130 in)	313 cm (123 in)	(Iran) Saipa
2	Milad Ebadipour	17 October 1993	1.96 m (6 ft 5 in)	78 kg (172 lb)	350 cm (140 in)	310 cm (120 in)	(Poland) Skra Bełchatów
3	Saman Faezi	23 August 1991	2.04 m (6 ft 8 in)	87 kg (192 lb)	343 cm (135 in)	335 cm (132 in)	(Iran) Saipa
4	Saeid Marouf (C)	20 October 1985	1.89 m (6 ft 2 in)	81 kg (179 lb)	331 cm (130 in)	311 cm (122 in)	(Iran) Paykan
5	Farhad Ghaemi	28 August 1989	1.97 m (6 ft 6 in)	73 kg (161 lb)	355 cm (140 in)	335 cm (132 in)	(Iran) Sarmayeh Bank
6	Mohammad Mousavi	22 August 1987	2.03 m (6 ft 8 in)	86 kg (190 lb)	362 cm (143 in)	344 cm (135 in)	(Iran) Sarmayeh Bank
7	Meisam Salehi	17 November 1998	1.98 m (6 ft 6 in)	89 kg (196 lb)	345 cm (136 in)	330 cm (130 in)	(Iran) Kalleh Mazandaran
8	Mostafa Heydari	14 December 1991	1.75 m (5 ft 9 in)	68 kg (150 lb)	263 cm (104 in)	259 cm (102 in)	(Iran) Saipa
9	Masoud Gholami	2 April 1990	2.04 m (6 ft 8 in)	93 kg (205 lb)	349 cm (137 in)	331 cm (130 in)	(Iran) Shahrdari Varamin
10	Amir Ghafour	6 June 1991	2.02 m (6 ft 8 in)	90 kg (200 lb)	354 cm (139 in)	334 cm (131 in)	(Iran) Saipa
11	Saber Kazemi	24 December 1998	2.05 m (6 ft 9 in)	87 kg (192 lb)	340 cm (130 in)	325 cm (128 in)	(Iran) Shams Tehran
12	Mojtaba Mirzajanpour	7 October 1991	2.05 m (6 ft 9 in)	88 kg (194 lb)	355 cm (140 in)	348 cm (137 in)	(Iran) Sarmayeh Bank
14	Mohammad Javad Manavinejad	27 November 1995	1.98 m (6 ft 6 in)	94 kg (207 lb)	340 cm (130 in)	320 cm (130 in)	(Italy) Verona
15	Aliasghar Mojarad	30 October 1997	2.05 m (6 ft 9 in)	90 kg (200 lb)	330 cm (130 in)	310 cm (120 in)	(Iran) Kashan
16	Ali Shafiei	21 September 1991	1.90 m (6 ft 3 in)	80 kg (180 lb)	348 cm (137 in)	345 cm (136 in)	(Iran) Sarmayeh Bank
18	Mohammad Taher Vadi	10 October 1989	1.94 m (6 ft 4 in)	72 kg (159 lb)	329 cm (130 in)	315 cm (124 in)	(Iran) Ardakan
19	Mehdi Marandi	12 May 1986	1.72 m (5 ft 8 in)	69 kg (152 lb)	295 cm (116 in)	280 cm (110 in)	(Iran) Sarmayeh Bank
20	Porya Yali	21 January 1999	2.09 m (6 ft 10 in)	81 kg (179 lb)	335 cm (132 in)	320 cm (130 in)	(Iran) Paykan
21	Morteza Sharifi	27 May 1999	1.93 m (6 ft 4 in)	83 kg (183 lb)	340 cm (130 in)	320 cm (130 in)	(Iran) Shams Tehran
24	Mohammad Reza Hazratpour	31 March 1999	1.87 m (6 ft 2 in)	87 kg (192 lb)	300 cm (120 in)	290 cm (110 in)	(Iran) Shams Tehran
25	Amir Hossein Toukhteh	9 April 2001	2.03 m (6 ft 8 in)	79 kg (174 lb)	350 cm (140 in)	325 cm (128 in)	(Iran) Shams Tehran

== Italy ==
The following is the Italy roster in the 2018 Men's VNL.

Head coach: Gianlorenzo Blengini

No.	Name	Date of birth	Height	Weight	Spike	Block	2017–18 club
1	Davide Candellaro	7 June 1989	2.00 m (6 ft 7 in)	88 kg (194 lb)	340 cm (130 in)	320 cm (130 in)	(Italy) Civitanova
2	Luigi Randazzo	30 April 1994	1.98 m (6 ft 6 in)	97 kg (214 lb)	352 cm (139 in)	255 cm (100 in)	(Italy) Padova
3	Simone Parodi	16 June 1986	1.96 m (6 ft 5 in)	82 kg (181 lb)	350 cm (140 in)	335 cm (132 in)	(Italy) Piacenza
4	Michele Baranowicz	5 August 1989	1.96 m (6 ft 5 in)	93 kg (205 lb)	350 cm (140 in)	328 cm (129 in)	(Italy) Piacenza
5	Osmany Juantorena	12 August 1985	2.00 m (6 ft 7 in)	85 kg (187 lb)	370 cm (150 in)	340 cm (130 in)	(Italy) Civitanova
6	Simone Giannelli	9 August 1996	1.98 m (6 ft 6 in)	92 kg (203 lb)	350 cm (140 in)	330 cm (130 in)	(Italy) Trentino
7	Salvatore Rossini	13 July 1986	1.85 m (6 ft 1 in)	82 kg (181 lb)	312 cm (123 in)	301 cm (119 in)	(Italy) Modena
8	Daniele Mazzone	4 June 1992	2.08 m (6 ft 10 in)	88 kg (194 lb)	315 cm (124 in)	309 cm (122 in)	(Italy) Modena
9	Ivan Zaytsev	2 October 1988	2.04 m (6 ft 8 in)	100 kg (220 lb)	370 cm (150 in)	355 cm (140 in)	(Italy) Perugia
10	Filippo Lanza	3 March 1991	1.98 m (6 ft 6 in)	98 kg (216 lb)	350 cm (140 in)	330 cm (130 in)	(Italy) Trentino
11	Fabio Balaso	20 October 1995	1.78 m (5 ft 10 in)	73 kg (161 lb)	305 cm (120 in)	280 cm (110 in)	(Italy) Padova
12	Enrico Cester	16 March 1988	2.02 m (6 ft 8 in)	93 kg (205 lb)	336 cm (132 in)	321 cm (126 in)	(Italy) Civitanova
13	Massimo Colaci	21 February 1985	1.80 m (5 ft 11 in)	75 kg (165 lb)	314 cm (124 in)	306 cm (120 in)	(Italy) Perugia
14	Enrico Diamantini	4 April 1993	2.04 m (6 ft 8 in)	90 kg (200 lb)	340 cm (130 in)	260 cm (100 in)	(Italy) Ravenna
15	Gabriele Maruotti	25 March 1988	1.95 m (6 ft 5 in)	92 kg (203 lb)	348 cm (137 in)	340 cm (130 in)	(Italy) Latina
16	Oleg Antonov	28 July 1988	1.98 m (6 ft 6 in)	88 kg (194 lb)	340 cm (130 in)	310 cm (120 in)	(Turkey) Ziraat Ankara
17	Simone Anzani	24 February 1992	2.04 m (6 ft 8 in)	100 kg (220 lb)	350 cm (140 in)	330 cm (130 in)	(Italy) Perugia
18	Giulio Sabbi	10 August 1989	2.01 m (6 ft 7 in)	92 kg (203 lb)	352 cm (139 in)	325 cm (128 in)	(Italy) Modena
19	Luca Spirito	30 October 1993	1.96 m (6 ft 5 in)	79 kg (174 lb)	338 cm (133 in)	262 cm (103 in)	(Italy) Verona
20	Gabriele Nelli	4 December 1993	2.10 m (6 ft 11 in)	100 kg (220 lb)	355 cm (140 in)	320 cm (130 in)	(Italy) Padova
23	Andrea Argenta	1 June 1996	2.05 m (6 ft 9 in)	95 kg (209 lb)	350 cm (140 in)	310 cm (120 in)	(Italy) Modena

== Japan ==
The following is the Japan roster in the 2018 Men's VNL.

Head coach: Yuichi Nakagaichi

No.	Name	Date of birth	Height	Weight	Spike	Block	2017–18 club
1	Issei Ōtake	3 December 1995	2.01 m (6 ft 7 in)	98 kg (216 lb)	345 cm (136 in)	327 cm (129 in)	(Japan) Panasonic Panthers
2	Hideomi Fukatsu (C)	1 June 1990	1.80 m (5 ft 11 in)	70 kg (150 lb)	325 cm (128 in)	305 cm (120 in)	(Japan) Panasonic Panthers
3	Naonobu Fujii	5 January 1992	1.83 m (6 ft 0 in)	78 kg (172 lb)	312 cm (123 in)	297 cm (117 in)	(Japan) Toray Arrows
5	Tatsuya Fukuzawa	1 July 1986	1.89 m (6 ft 2 in)	88 kg (194 lb)	355 cm (140 in)	330 cm (130 in)	(Japan) Panasonic Panthers
6	Akihiro Yamauchi	30 November 1993	2.04 m (6 ft 8 in)	80 kg (180 lb)	353 cm (139 in)	335 cm (132 in)	(Japan) Panasonic Panthers
7	Takashi Dekita	13 August 1991	2.00 m (6 ft 7 in)	94 kg (207 lb)	346 cm (136 in)	331 cm (130 in)	(Japan) Osaka Blazers Sakai
8	Masahiro Yanagida	6 July 1992	1.86 m (6 ft 1 in)	79 kg (174 lb)	328 cm (129 in)	301 cm (119 in)	Free agent
9	Satoshi Ide	16 January 1992	1.74 m (5 ft 9 in)	74 kg (163 lb)	303 cm (119 in)	290 cm (110 in)	(Japan) Toray Arrows
10	Taichiro Koga	4 October 1989	1.70 m (5 ft 7 in)	70 kg (150 lb)	292 cm (115 in)	277 cm (109 in)	(Japan) Toyoda Gosei Trefuerza
12	Takuya Takamatsu	8 January 1988	1.86 m (6 ft 1 in)	86 kg (190 lb)	331 cm (130 in)	315 cm (124 in)	(Japan) Toyoda Gosei Trefuerza
13	Naoya Takano	30 April 1993	1.90 m (6 ft 3 in)	78 kg (172 lb)	338 cm (133 in)	316 cm (124 in)	(Japan) Osaka Blazers Sakai
14	Yūki Ishikawa	11 December 1995	1.91 m (6 ft 3 in)	84 kg (185 lb)	351 cm (138 in)	327 cm (129 in)	Free agent
15	Haku Ri	27 December 1990	1.93 m (6 ft 4 in)	82 kg (181 lb)	344 cm (135 in)	330 cm (130 in)	(Japan) Toray Arrows
16	Kentaro Takahashi	8 February 1995	2.01 m (6 ft 7 in)	103 kg (227 lb)	351 cm (138 in)	338 cm (133 in)	(Japan) Toray Arrows
18	Masahiro Sekita	20 November 1993	1.75 m (5 ft 9 in)	72 kg (159 lb)	311 cm (122 in)	295 cm (116 in)	(Japan) Panasonic Panthers
19	Hiroaki Asano	6 October 1990	1.75 m (5 ft 9 in)	72 kg (159 lb)	311 cm (122 in)	295 cm (116 in)	(Japan) JTEKT Stings
20	Ryuta Homma	7 October 1991	1.78 m (5 ft 10 in)	71 kg (157 lb)	325 cm (128 in)	305 cm (120 in)	(Japan) JTEKT Stings
21	Takeshi Ogawa	7 July 1994	1.93 m (6 ft 4 in)	90 kg (200 lb)	350 cm (140 in)	330 cm (130 in)	(Japan) Suntory Sunbirds
23	Yamato Fushimi	24 December 1991	2.07 m (6 ft 9 in)	113 kg (249 lb)	340 cm (130 in)	330 cm (130 in)	(Japan) Toray Arrows
25	Taishi Onodera	27 February 1996	2.01 m (6 ft 7 in)	98 kg (216 lb)	346 cm (136 in)	323 cm (127 in)	(Japan) JT Thunders
32	Yuji Nishida	30 January 2000	1.86 m (6 ft 1 in)	80 kg (180 lb)	346 cm (136 in)	330 cm (130 in)	(Japan) JTEKT Stings

== Poland ==
The following is the Poland roster in the 2018 Men's VNL.

Head coach: Vital Heynen

No.	Name	Date of birth	Height	Weight	Spike	Block	2017–18 club
1	Piotr Nowakowski	18 December 1987	2.05 m (6 ft 9 in)	90 kg (200 lb)	355 cm (140 in)	340 cm (130 in)	(Poland) Gdańsk
2	Maciej Muzaj	21 May 1994	2.08 m (6 ft 10 in)	86 kg (190 lb)	360 cm (140 in)	320 cm (130 in)	(Poland) Jastrzębski Węgiel
3	Dawid Konarski	31 August 1989	1.98 m (6 ft 6 in)	93 kg (205 lb)	353 cm (139 in)	320 cm (130 in)	(Turkey) Ziraat Ankara
5	Łukasz Kaczmarek	29 June 1994	2.04 m (6 ft 8 in)	99 kg (218 lb)	345 cm (136 in)	332 cm (131 in)	(Poland) Lubin
6	Bartosz Kurek	29 August 1988	2.05 m (6 ft 9 in)	87 kg (192 lb)	352 cm (139 in)	326 cm (128 in)	(Turkey) Ziraat Ankara
7	Artur Szalpuk	20 March 1995	2.01 m (6 ft 7 in)	93 kg (205 lb)	350 cm (140 in)	335 cm (132 in)	(Poland) Gdańsk
8	Damian Schulz	26 February 1990	2.08 m (6 ft 10 in)	95 kg (209 lb)	355 cm (140 in)	330 cm (130 in)	(Poland) Gdańsk
9	Bartłomiej Lemański	19 March 1996	2.17 m (7 ft 1 in)	103 kg (227 lb)	360 cm (140 in)	345 cm (136 in)	(Poland) Rzeszów
11	Fabian Drzyzga	3 January 1990	1.96 m (6 ft 5 in)	90 kg (200 lb)	325 cm (128 in)	304 cm (120 in)	(Greece) Olympiacos
12	Grzegorz Łomacz	1 October 1987	1.87 m (6 ft 2 in)	80 kg (180 lb)	335 cm (132 in)	315 cm (124 in)	(Poland) Skra Bełchatów
13	Michał Kubiak (C)	23 February 1988	1.91 m (6 ft 3 in)	80 kg (180 lb)	328 cm (129 in)	312 cm (123 in)	(Japan) Panasonic Panthers
14	Aleksander Śliwka	24 May 1995	1.96 m (6 ft 5 in)	88 kg (194 lb)	340 cm (130 in)	315 cm (124 in)	(Poland) Rzeszów
15	Jakub Kochanowski	17 July 1997	1.99 m (6 ft 6 in)	89 kg (196 lb)	353 cm (139 in)	323 cm (127 in)	(Poland) Olsztyn
16	Michał Żurek	3 June 1988	1.82 m (6 ft 0 in)	73 kg (161 lb)	320 cm (130 in)	234 cm (92 in)	(Poland) Olsztyn
17	Paweł Zatorski	21 June 1990	1.84 m (6 ft 0 in)	73 kg (161 lb)	328 cm (129 in)	304 cm (120 in)	(Poland) Kędzierzyn-Koźle
18	Bartosz Kwolek	17 July 1997	1.92 m (6 ft 4 in)	91 kg (201 lb)	343 cm (135 in)	310 cm (120 in)	(Poland) Warszawa
19	Marcin Janusz	31 July 1994	1.95 m (6 ft 5 in)	85 kg (187 lb)	330 cm (130 in)	316 cm (124 in)	(Poland) Skra Bełchatów
20	Mateusz Bieniek	5 April 1994	2.10 m (6 ft 11 in)	98 kg (216 lb)	351 cm (138 in)	326 cm (128 in)	(Poland) Kędzierzyn-Koźle
21	Mateusz Mika	21 January 1991	2.06 m (6 ft 9 in)	86 kg (190 lb)	352 cm (139 in)	320 cm (130 in)	(Poland) Gdańsk
22	Bartosz Bednorz	25 July 1994	2.01 m (6 ft 7 in)	84 kg (185 lb)	350 cm (140 in)	315 cm (124 in)	(Poland) Skra Bełchatów
26	Kacper Piechocki	17 December 1995	1.84 m (6 ft 0 in)	74 kg (163 lb)	316 cm (124 in)	305 cm (120 in)	(Poland) Skra Bełchatów

== Russia ==
The following is the Russia roster in the 2018 Men's VNL.

Head coach: Sergey Shlyapnikov

No.	Name	Date of birth	Height	Weight	Spike	Block	2017–18 club
1	Pavel Pankov	14 August 1995	1.98 m (6 ft 6 in)	90 kg (200 lb)	345 cm (136 in)	330 cm (130 in)	(Russia) Zenit Saint Petersburg
2	Ilya Vlasov	3 August 1995	2.12 m (6 ft 11 in)	98 kg (216 lb)	360 cm (140 in)	345 cm (136 in)	(Russia) Fakel Novy Urengoy
3	Dmitry Kovalyov	15 March 1991	1.98 m (6 ft 6 in)	82 kg (181 lb)	340 cm (130 in)	330 cm (130 in)	(Russia) Ural Ufa
4	Artem Volvich	22 January 1990	2.08 m (6 ft 10 in)	96 kg (212 lb)	350 cm (140 in)	330 cm (130 in)	(Russia) Zenit Kazan
6	Anton Karpukhov	23 April 1988	1.97 m (6 ft 6 in)	88 kg (194 lb)	337 cm (133 in)	325 cm (128 in)	(Russia) Kuzbass Kemerovo
7	Dmitry Volkov	25 May 1995	2.01 m (6 ft 7 in)	88 kg (194 lb)	340 cm (130 in)	330 cm (130 in)	(Russia) Fakel Novy Urengoy
8	Sergey Savin	7 October 1988	2.01 m (6 ft 7 in)	92 kg (203 lb)	343 cm (135 in)	325 cm (128 in)	(Russia) Lokomotiv Novosibirsk
9	Aleksandr Sokolov	1 March 1982	1.93 m (6 ft 4 in)	97 kg (214 lb)	315 cm (124 in)	310 cm (120 in)	(Russia) Yaroslavich Yaroslavl
10	Aleksandr Markin	28 July 1990	1.96 m (6 ft 5 in)	94 kg (207 lb)	350 cm (140 in)	330 cm (130 in)	(Russia) Dinamo Moscow
11	Igor Filippov	19 March 1991	2.05 m (6 ft 9 in)	107 kg (236 lb)	340 cm (130 in)	326 cm (128 in)	(Russia) Ural Ufa
12	Konstantin Bakun	15 March 1985	2.04 m (6 ft 8 in)	96 kg (212 lb)	348 cm (137 in)	325 cm (128 in)	(Russia) Belogorie
13	Dmitry Muserskiy	29 October 1988	2.18 m (7 ft 2 in)	104 kg (229 lb)	375 cm (148 in)	347 cm (137 in)	(Russia) Belogorie
14	Yaroslav Podlesnykh	3 September 1994	1.98 m (6 ft 6 in)	89 kg (196 lb)	341 cm (134 in)	330 cm (130 in)	(Russia) Kuzbass Kemerovo
15	Viktor Poletaev	27 July 1995	1.97 m (6 ft 6 in)	86 kg (190 lb)	360 cm (140 in)	340 cm (130 in)	(Russia) Kuzbass Kemerovo
17	Maxim Mikhaylov	19 March 1988	2.02 m (6 ft 8 in)	103 kg (227 lb)	345 cm (136 in)	330 cm (130 in)	(Russia) Zenit Kazan
18	Egor Kliuka	15 June 1995	2.08 m (6 ft 10 in)	93 kg (205 lb)	360 cm (140 in)	350 cm (140 in)	(Russia) Fakel Novy Urengoy
19	Romanas Shkulyavichus	21 February 1992	1.98 m (6 ft 6 in)	88 kg (194 lb)	360 cm (140 in)	330 cm (130 in)	(Russia) NOVA Novokuybyshevsk
22	Roman Martynyuk	13 April 1987	1.82 m (6 ft 0 in)	75 kg (165 lb)	320 cm (130 in)	310 cm (120 in)	(Russia) Lokomotiv Novosibirsk
23	Igor Kobzar	13 April 1991	1.98 m (6 ft 6 in)	86 kg (190 lb)	337 cm (133 in)	315 cm (124 in)	(Russia) Kuzbass Kemerovo
24	Aleksey Kabeshov	22 June 1991	1.90 m (6 ft 3 in)	83 kg (183 lb)	319 cm (126 in)	314 cm (124 in)	(Russia) Ural Ufa
25	Inal Tavasiev	28 March 1989	2.02 m (6 ft 8 in)	98 kg (216 lb)	343 cm (135 in)	332 cm (131 in)	(Russia) Kuzbass Kemerovo

== Serbia ==
The following is the Serbia roster in the 2018 Men's VNL.

Head coach: Nikola Grbić

No.	Name	Date of birth	Height	Weight	Spike	Block	2017–18 club
1	Aleksandar Okolić	26 June 1993	2.05 m (6 ft 9 in)	90 kg (200 lb)	347 cm (137 in)	320 cm (130 in)	(Germany) Berlin Recycling Volleys
2	Uroš Kovačević	6 May 1993	1.97 m (6 ft 6 in)	90 kg (200 lb)	340 cm (130 in)	320 cm (130 in)	(Italy) Trentino
3	Milan Katić	22 October 1993	2.02 m (6 ft 8 in)	99 kg (218 lb)	345 cm (136 in)	331 cm (130 in)	(Poland) Skra Bełchatów
6	Goran Škundrić	23 November 1987	1.97 m (6 ft 6 in)	94 kg (207 lb)	340 cm (130 in)	320 cm (130 in)	(France) Grand Nancy
7	Petar Krsmanović	1 June 1990	2.05 m (6 ft 9 in)	98 kg (216 lb)	354 cm (139 in)	330 cm (130 in)	(Russia) Surgut
8	Marko Ivović	22 December 1990	1.94 m (6 ft 4 in)	89 kg (196 lb)	365 cm (144 in)	330 cm (130 in)	(Brazil) Taubaté
9	Nikola Jovović	13 February 1992	1.97 m (6 ft 6 in)	75 kg (165 lb)	335 cm (132 in)	315 cm (124 in)	(Turkey) Arkas
11	Maksim Buculjević	20 September 1991	1.92 m (6 ft 4 in)	83 kg (183 lb)	320 cm (130 in)	307 cm (121 in)	(Finland) Hurrikaani Loimaa
12	Nikola Mijailović	8 August 1989	1.91 m (6 ft 3 in)	85 kg (187 lb)	345 cm (136 in)	330 cm (130 in)	(France) Chaumont
13	Dušan Petković	27 January 1992	2.02 m (6 ft 8 in)	86 kg (190 lb)	328 cm (129 in)	310 cm (120 in)	(Italy) Sora
14	Aleksandar Atanasijević	4 September 1991	2.00 m (6 ft 7 in)	92 kg (203 lb)	350 cm (140 in)	329 cm (130 in)	(Italy) Perugia
16	Dražen Luburić	2 November 1993	2.02 m (6 ft 8 in)	90 kg (200 lb)	337 cm (133 in)	331 cm (130 in)	(Russia) Zenit Saint Petersburg
17	Neven Majstorović	17 March 1989	1.93 m (6 ft 4 in)	90 kg (200 lb)	335 cm (132 in)	325 cm (128 in)	(Romania) Galați
18	Marko Podraščanin	29 August 1987	2.03 m (6 ft 8 in)	100 kg (220 lb)	354 cm (139 in)	332 cm (131 in)	(Italy) Perugia
19	Nikola Rosić	5 August 1984	1.92 m (6 ft 4 in)	85 kg (187 lb)	330 cm (130 in)	320 cm (130 in)	(Romania) Craiova
20	Srećko Lisinac	17 May 1992	2.05 m (6 ft 9 in)	90 kg (200 lb)	355 cm (140 in)	342 cm (135 in)	(Poland) Skra Bełchatów
21	Ivan Kostić	8 January 1988	1.92 m (6 ft 4 in)	90 kg (200 lb)	327 cm (129 in)	320 cm (130 in)	(Romania) Steaua București
24	David Mehić	24 September 1997	1.96 m (6 ft 5 in)	83 kg (183 lb)	345 cm (136 in)	330 cm (130 in)	(Serbia) Vojvodina
25	Irfan Hamzagić	14 February 1992	2.00 m (6 ft 7 in)	92 kg (203 lb)	350 cm (140 in)	330 cm (130 in)	(Serbia) Novi Pazar
26	Stevan Simić	21 March 1996	2.01 m (6 ft 7 in)	85 kg (187 lb)	330 cm (130 in)	315 cm (124 in)	(Serbia) Vojvodina
29	Lazar Ćirović	26 February 1992	1.96 m (6 ft 5 in)	83 kg (183 lb)	343 cm (135 in)	323 cm (127 in)	(Italy) Padova

== South Korea ==
The following is the South Korea roster in the 2018 Men's VNL.

Head coach: Kim Ho-chul

No.	Name	Date of birth	Height	Weight	Spike	Block	2017–18 club
1	Song Myung-geun	12 March 1993	1.96 m (6 ft 5 in)	85 kg (187 lb)	325 cm (128 in)	315 cm (124 in)	(South Korea) OK Savings Bank Rush & Cash
2	Hwang Taek-eui	12 November 1996	1.89 m (6 ft 2 in)	79 kg (174 lb)	305 cm (120 in)	300 cm (120 in)	(South Korea) KB Insurance Stars
3	Seo Jae-duck	21 July 1989	1.94 m (6 ft 4 in)	94 kg (207 lb)	315 cm (124 in)	305 cm (120 in)	(South Korea) KEPCO Vixtorm
4	Jeong Min-su	5 October 1991	1.78 m (5 ft 10 in)	75 kg (165 lb)	300 cm (120 in)	290 cm (110 in)	(South Korea) Woori Card Wibee
5	Kwak Dong-hyuk	12 March 1983	1.78 m (5 ft 10 in)	69 kg (152 lb)	265 cm (104 in)	260 cm (100 in)	(South Korea) KB Insurance Stars
6	Lee Min-gyu	3 December 1992	1.94 m (6 ft 4 in)	78 kg (172 lb)	305 cm (120 in)	295 cm (116 in)	(South Korea) OK Savings Bank Rush & Cash
7	Song Hui-chae	29 April 1992	1.91 m (6 ft 3 in)	76 kg (168 lb)	305 cm (120 in)	295 cm (116 in)	(South Korea) OK Savings Bank Rush & Cash
8	Na Gyeong-bok	8 April 1994	1.95 m (6 ft 5 in)	78 kg (172 lb)	320 cm (130 in)	315 cm (124 in)	(South Korea) Woori Card Wibee
9	Kwak Seung-suk	23 March 1988	1.90 m (6 ft 3 in)	81 kg (179 lb)	325 cm (128 in)	320 cm (130 in)	(South Korea) Korean Air Jumbos
10	Jung Ji-seok	10 March 1995	1.94 m (6 ft 4 in)	87 kg (192 lb)	310 cm (120 in)	300 cm (120 in)	(South Korea) Korean Air Jumbos
11	Choi Min-ho	28 April 1988	1.98 m (6 ft 6 in)	86 kg (190 lb)	330 cm (130 in)	312 cm (123 in)	(South Korea) Cheonan Skywalkers
12	Jeon Kwang-in	18 September 1991	1.94 m (6 ft 4 in)	82 kg (181 lb)	310 cm (120 in)	300 cm (120 in)	(South Korea) KEPCO Vixtorm
13	Hwang Seung-bin	26 August 1992	1.83 m (6 ft 0 in)	78 kg (172 lb)	310 cm (120 in)	300 cm (120 in)	(South Korea) Korean Air Jumbos
14	Hwang Du-yeon	9 April 1993	1.90 m (6 ft 3 in)	77 kg (170 lb)	310 cm (120 in)	300 cm (120 in)	(South Korea) KB Insurance Stars
15	Moon Sung-min	14 September 1986	1.98 m (6 ft 6 in)	89 kg (196 lb)	329 cm (130 in)	321 cm (126 in)	(South Korea) Hyundai Capital Skywalkers
16	Kim Kyu-min	28 December 1990	1.99 m (6 ft 6 in)	92 kg (203 lb)	320 cm (130 in)	310 cm (120 in)	(South Korea) Samsung Fire Bluefangs
17	Park Sang-ha	4 April 1986	1.98 m (6 ft 6 in)	89 kg (196 lb)	327 cm (129 in)	315 cm (124 in)	(South Korea) Samsung Fire Bluefangs
18	Jin Seong-tae	3 February 1993	1.97 m (6 ft 6 in)	85 kg (187 lb)	315 cm (124 in)	305 cm (120 in)	(South Korea) Korean Air Jumbos
19	Kim Jae-hwi	6 September 1993	2.04 m (6 ft 8 in)	85 kg (187 lb)	330 cm (130 in)	320 cm (130 in)	(South Korea) Hyundai Capital Skywalkers
20	Cha Ji-hwan	9 May 1996	2.01 m (6 ft 7 in)	82 kg (181 lb)	330 cm (130 in)	315 cm (124 in)	(South Korea) OK Savings Bank Rush & Cash
21	Park Jin-woo	18 March 1990	1.98 m (6 ft 6 in)	78 kg (172 lb)	340 cm (130 in)	318 cm (125 in)	(South Korea) Sangmu

== United States ==
The following is the United States roster in the 2018 Men's VNL.

Head coach: John Speraw

No.	Name	Date of birth	Height	Weight	Spike	Block	2017–18 club
1	Matt Anderson	18 April 1987	2.02 m (6 ft 8 in)	100 kg (220 lb)	360 cm (140 in)	332 cm (131 in)	(Russia) Zenit Kazan
2	Aaron Russell	4 June 1993	2.05 m (6 ft 9 in)	98 kg (216 lb)	356 cm (140 in)	337 cm (133 in)	(Italy) Perugia
3	Taylor Sander	17 March 1992	1.96 m (6 ft 5 in)	80 kg (180 lb)	345 cm (136 in)	320 cm (130 in)	(Italy) Civitanova
4	Jeffrey Jendryk	15 September 1995	2.08 m (6 ft 10 in)	89 kg (196 lb)	353 cm (139 in)	345 cm (136 in)	(United States) Loyola University Chicago
5	James Shaw	5 March 1994	2.03 m (6 ft 8 in)	98 kg (216 lb)	354 cm (139 in)	338 cm (133 in)	(United States) Stanford University
6	Mitchell Stahl	31 August 1994	2.03 m (6 ft 8 in)	84 kg (185 lb)	350 cm (140 in)	325 cm (128 in)	(France) Paris
7	Kawika Shoji	11 November 1987	1.90 m (6 ft 3 in)	79 kg (174 lb)	331 cm (130 in)	315 cm (124 in)	(Italy) Monza
8	Torey Defalco	10 April 1997	1.98 m (6 ft 6 in)	95 kg (209 lb)	340 cm (130 in)	328 cm (129 in)	(United States) California State University
10	Daniel Mcdonnell	15 September 1988	2.00 m (6 ft 7 in)	90 kg (200 lb)	355 cm (140 in)	345 cm (136 in)	(Poland) Gdańsk
11	Micah Christenson	8 May 1993	1.98 m (6 ft 6 in)	88 kg (194 lb)	349 cm (137 in)	340 cm (130 in)	(Italy) Civitanova
12	Maxwell Holt	12 March 1987	2.05 m (6 ft 9 in)	90 kg (200 lb)	351 cm (138 in)	333 cm (131 in)	(Italy) Modena
13	Benjamin Patch	21 June 1994	2.03 m (6 ft 8 in)	90 kg (200 lb)	368 cm (145 in)	348 cm (137 in)	(Italy) Vibo Valentia
15	Brenden Sander	22 December 1995	1.93 m (6 ft 4 in)	78 kg (172 lb)	358 cm (141 in)	337 cm (133 in)	(United States) Brigham Young University
17	Thomas Jaeschke	4 September 1993	1.98 m (6 ft 6 in)	84 kg (185 lb)	348 cm (137 in)	330 cm (130 in)	(Italy) Verona
18	Jake Langlois	14 May 1992	2.08 m (6 ft 10 in)	93 kg (205 lb)	365 cm (144 in)	355 cm (140 in)	(United States) Brigham Young University
19	Taylor Averill	5 March 1992	2.01 m (6 ft 7 in)	94 kg (207 lb)	370 cm (150 in)	330 cm (130 in)	(Italy) Milano
20	David Smith (C)	15 May 1985	2.01 m (6 ft 7 in)	86 kg (190 lb)	348 cm (137 in)	314 cm (124 in)	(Poland) Zawiercie
21	Dustin Watten	27 October 1986	1.82 m (6 ft 0 in)	80 kg (180 lb)	306 cm (120 in)	295 cm (116 in)	(Poland) Czarni Radom
22	Erik Shoji	24 August 1989	1.84 m (6 ft 0 in)	83 kg (183 lb)	330 cm (130 in)	321 cm (126 in)	(Italy) Latina
23	Jonah Seif	30 October 1994	2.03 m (6 ft 8 in)	98 kg (216 lb)	351 cm (138 in)	338 cm (133 in)	(Poland) Będzin
26	Kyle Ensing	6 March 1997	2.01 m (6 ft 7 in)	100 kg (220 lb)	366 cm (144 in)	353 cm (139 in)	(United States) California State University
