= 2016–17 SuperLega =

- League: Italian Volleyball League
- Sport: Men's volleyball
- Duration: 2 October 2016 – 7 May 2017
- Number of teams: 14

Regular season
- Top seed: Cucine Lube Civitanova
- Top scorer: Giulio Sabbi

Finals
- Champions: Cucine Lube Civitanova
- Runners-up: Diatec Trentino
- Finals MVP: Jiří Kovář

Italian Volleyball League seasons
- ← 2015–16 2017–18 →

2016–17 SuperLega is the 72nd season of the Italian Championship (highest level of Italian Volleyball League) organized under the supervision of Federazione Italiana Pallavolo. This season is composed of 14 teams, two more than the last season. Biosì Indexa Sora and Tonno Callipo Calabria Vibo Valentia are the new additions to the league.

The Super Cup preceded the regular season on 24-25 September. Azimut Modena won the Super Cup for the second consecutive year.

== Super Cup (Pre-season) ==
Four teams participated in Italian Super Cup. Modena won the tournament defeating Perugia in the final match.

- Azimut Modena
- Cucine Lube Civitanova
- Diatec Trentino
- Sir Safety Conad Perugia

Semifinals
24 Sep — Match Report
Azimut Modena	3
Diatec Trentino	1
24 Sep — Match Report
Cucine Lube Civitanova	1
Sir Safety Conad Perugia	3

Final
25 Sep — Match Report
Azimut Modena	3
Sir Safety Conad Perugia	2

== Regular season ==
Pos	Team	Pld	W	L	Pts	SW	SL	SR	SPW	SPL	SPR
1	Cucine Lube Civitanova	26	23	3	68	74	24	3.083	2324	1938	1.199
2	Diatec Trentino	26	21	5	62	68	26	2.615	2198	1984	1.108
3	Sir Safety Conad Perugia	26	21	5	62	70	28	2.500	2301	2040	1.128
4	Azimut Modena	22	16	6	45	52	29	1.793	2344	2206	1.063
5	Calzedonia Verona	32	22	10	62	72	49	1.469	2097	2019	1.039
6	LPR Piacenza	26	15	11	40	53	51	1.039	2354	2368	0.994
7	Gi Group Monza	26	11	15	34	43	54	0.796	2112	2189	0.965
8	Tonno Callipo Calabria Vibo Valentia	26	11	15	32	45	58	0.776	2280	2413	0.945
9	Bunge Ravenna	26	10	16	32	44	56	0.786	2271	2265	1.003
10	Exprivia Molfetta	26	9	17	27	42	60	0.700	2211	2332	0.948
11	Top Volley Latina	26	8	18	26	39	63	0.619	2239	2347	0.954
12	Kioene Padova	26	6	20	22	36	63	0.571	2135	2319	0.921
13	Biosì Indexa Sora	26	6	20	20	32	66	0.485	2110	2310	0.913
14	Revivre Milano	26	5	21	18	27	68	0.397	2032	2278	0.892

	MOD	RAV	VER	TRE	MON	PAD	PIA	CIV	MOL	MIL	PER	SOR	VAL	LAT
Azimut Modena		1–3	3–0	3–2	1–3	3–0	3–1	3–2	3–1	3–2	3–2	3–0	3–0	3–2
Bunge Ravenna	2–3		1–3	1–3	3–1	3–1	3–0	1–3	2–3	3–0	0–3	3–2	1–3	3–2
Calzedonia Verona	3–0	3–0		0–3	3–2	3–0	3–0	2–3	3–0	3–1	0–3	3–1	2–3	3–1
Diatec Trentino	3–0	3–0	3–0		3–2	3–1	3–0	3–1	3–0	3–0	3–1	3–1	3–0	3–0
Gi Group Monza	2–3	3–2	0–3	0–3		3–1	1–3	0–3	3–1	3–0	0–3	3–1	3–1	3–0
Kioene Padova	0–3	3–0	0–3	2–3	3–0		0–3	1–3	3–0	3–1	1–3	3–0	1–3	0–3
LPR Piacenza	1–3	3–0	3–2	3–1	2–3	3–2		1–3	3–1	3–2	1–3	3–2	3–1	3–1
Cucine Lube Civitanova	3–1	3–0	3–0	3–0	3–0	3–2	3–0		3–1	3–0	3–2	3–1	3–1	3–0
Exprivia Molfetta	3–1	1–3	3–0	2–3	3–1	3–0	2–3	3–2		1–3	0–3	3–0	0–3	3–2
Revivre Milano	1–3	0–3	0–3	0–3	0–3	3–1	1–3	0–3	3–1		0–3	3–2	2–3	2–3
Sir Safety Conad Perugia	1–3	3–2	3–0	3–0	3–1	3–1	3–1	1–3	3–2	3–0		3–0	3–1	3–0
Biosì Indexa Sora	0–3	0–3	1–3	0–3	3–0	3–2	0–3	0–3	3–1	3–0	0–3		3–1	1–3
T. Callipo Vibo Valentia	0–3	3–1	0–3	3–2	0–3	3–2	3–1	0–3	1–3	3–0	2–3	2–3		3–1
Top Volley Latina	0–3	3–1	0–3	0–3	3–0	2–3	2–3	1–3	3–1	0–3	1–3	3–2	3–2	

Legend: Blue = left column team win; Red = top row team win.

== Play-offs ==
Quarterfinals
1	Cucine Lube Civitanova	3	3	X
8	Tonno Callipo Calabria Vibo Valentia	0	0	X
4	Azimut Modena	1	3	3
5	Calzedonia Verona	3	0	1
2	Diatec Trentino	3	3	X
7	Gi Group Monza	0	0	X
3	Sir Safety Conad Perugia	3	3	X
6	LPR Piacenza	0	0	X

Semifinals
1	Cucine Lube Civitanova	3	1	3	3	X
4	Azimut Modena	2	3	2	2	X
2	Diatec Trentino	3	1	3	0	3
3	Sir Safety Conad Perugia	1	3	1	3	0

Finals
1	Cucine Lube Civitanova	3	3	3	X	X
2	Diatec Trentino	0	2	1	X	X

=== Quarterfinals ===
- Best-of-three series

Date	Time		Score		Set 1	Set 2	Set 3	Set 4	Set 5	Total	Report
5 Mar	15:00	Cucine Lube Civitanova	3–0	Tonno Callipo Calabria Vibo Valentia	25–13	25–15	25–20			75–48	Report
8 Mar	20:30	Tonno Callipo Calabria Vibo Valentia	0–3	Cucine Lube Civitanova	16–25	18–25	18–25			52–75	Report

Date	Time		Score		Set 1	Set 2	Set 3	Set 4	Set 5	Total	Report
4 Mar	20:30	Azimut Modena	1–3	Calzedona Verona	23–25	25–18	27–29	28–30		103–102	Report
9 Mar	20:30	Calzedona Verona	0–3	Azimut Modena	23–25	23–25	21–25			67–75	Report
12 Mar	18:15	Azimut Modena	3–1	Calzedona Verona	25–21	25–19	20–25	25–19		95–84	Report

Date	Time		Score		Set 1	Set 2	Set 3	Set 4	Set 5	Total	Report
5 Mar	18:00	Diatec Trentino	3–0	Gi Group Monza	25–15	25–18	25–18			75–51	Report
8 Mar	20:30	Gi Group Monza	0–3	Diatec Trentino	18–25	23–25	22–25			63–75	Report

Date	Time		Score		Set 1	Set 2	Set 3	Set 4	Set 5	Total	Report
4 Mar	20:30	Sir Safety Conad Perugia	3–0	LPR Piacenza	25–13	25–17	25–18			75–48	Report
8 Mar	20:30	LPR Piacenza	0–3	Sir Safety Conad Perugia	23–25	20–25	23–25			66–75	Report

=== Semifinals ===
- Best-of-five series

Date	Time		Score		Set 1	Set 2	Set 3	Set 4	Set 5	Total	Report
19 Mar	18:00	Cucine Lube Civitanova	3–2	Azimut Modena	25–22	22–25	20–25	25–19	15–11	107–102	Report
26 Mar	18:00	Azimut Modena	3–1	Cucine Lube Civitanova	21–25	27–25	25–16	34–32		107–98	Report
9 Apr	18:00	Cucine Lube Civitanova	3–2	Azimut Modena	25–21	26–24	21–25	15–25	15–12	102–107	Report
19 Apr	20:30	Azimut Modena	2–3	Cucine Lube Civitanova	15–25	25–19	22–25	25–22	10–15	97–106	Report

Date	Time		Score		Set 1	Set 2	Set 3	Set 4	Set 5	Total	Report
19 Mar	18:00	Diatec Trentino	3–1	Sir Safety Conad Perugia	16–25	25–22	26–24	25–22		92–93	Report
26 Mar	18:00	Sir Safety Conad Perugia	3–1	Diatec Trentino	30–28	20–25	25–19	25–22		100–94	Report
9 Apr	18:00	Diatec Trentino	3–1	Sir Safety Conad Perugia	28–26	30–28	22–25	25–21		105–100	Report
19 Apr	20:30	Sir Safety Conad Perugia	3–0	Diatec Trentino	25–21	25–21	25–23			75–65	Report
22 Apr	20:30	Diatec Trentino	3–0	Sir Safety Conad Perugia	25–22	25–19	25–21			75–62	Report

=== Finals ===
- Best-of-five series

Date	Time		Score		Set 1	Set 2	Set 3	Set 4	Set 5	Total	Report
25 Apr	18:00	Cucine Lube Civitanova	3–0	Diatec Trentino	25–18	25–20	25–17			75–55	Report
4 May	20:30	Diatec Trentino	2–3	Cucine Lube Civitanova	31–33	25–22	24–26	30–28	7–15	117–124	Report
7 May	16:30	Cucine Lube Civitanova	3–1	Diatec Trentino	28–26	25–20	18–25	25–14		96–85	Report

== Final standing ==
Rank	Team
1st place, gold medalist(s)	Cucine Lube Civitanova
2nd place, silver medalist(s)	Diatec Trentino
3rd place, bronze medalist(s)	Sir Safety Conad Perugia
4	Azimut Modena
5	Bunge Ravenna
6	LPR Piacenza
7	Calzedonia Verona
8	Gi Group Monza
9	Tonno Callipo Calabria Vibo Valentia
10	Exprivia Molfetta
11	Top Volley Latina
12	Biosì Indexa Sora
13	Kioene Padova
14	Revivre Milano

2017 Italian Champions
Cucine Lube Civitanova
4th title

Tsvetan Sokolov, Davide Candellaro, Nicola Pesaresi, Denys Kaliberda, Osmany Juantorena, Alberto Casadei, Dragan Stanković, Jiří Kovář, Micah Christenson, Enrico Cester, Jenia Grebennikov, Antonio Corvetta, Klemen Čebulj
Head coach
Gianlorenzo Blengini
