= 2017–18 Men's Volleyball Serie A1 =

2017–18 SuperLega
- League: Italian Volleyball League
- Sport: Men's volleyball
- Duration: 15 October 2017 – 6 May 2018
- Teams: 14

Regular season
- Top seed: Sir Safety Conad Perugia
- Top scorer: Dušan Petković

Finals
- Champions: Sir Safety Conad Perugia
- Runners-up: Cucine Lube Civitanova
- Finals MVP: Aleksandar Atanasijević

Italian Volleyball League seasons
- ← 2016–17 2018–19 →

2017–18 SuperLega is the 73rd season of the Italian Championship (highest level of Italian Volleyball League) organized under the supervision of Federazione Italiana Pallavolo. This season is composed of 14 teams.

The Super Cup preceded the regular season on October 7–8, 2017. Sir Safety Conad Perugia won the Super Cup.

== Team ==
Team	Stadium	Coach	Kit manufacturer
Modena	PalaPanini	Radostin Stoychev	
Top Latina	PalaBianchini	Vincenzo Di Pinto	
Trentino	PalaTrento	Angelo Lorenzetti	
Lube Civitanova	PalaCivitanova	Giampaolo Medei	
Power Milano	PalaDesio	Andrea Giani	
Gi Group Monza	Candy Arena	Miguel Ángel Falasca	
Padova	Kioene Arena	Valerio Baldovin	
Sir Safety Perugia	PalaEvangelisti	Lorenzo Bernardi	
Piacenza	PalaBanca	Alberto Giuliani	
Bunge Ravenna	Pala De Andrè	Fabio Soli	
BluVolley Verona	PalaOlimpia	Nikola Grbić	
Argos Biosì	Palazzetto dello Sport	Mario Barbiero	
Tonno Callipo	PalaValentia	Lorenzo Tubertini	
New Mater	PalaFlorio	Giuseppe Lorizio	

== Super Cup (Pre-season) ==
Four teams participated in Italian Super Cup. Perugia won the tournament defeating Civitanova in the final match.

- Azimut Modena
- Cucine Lube Civitanova
- Diatec Trentino
- Sir Safety Conad Perugia

Semifinals
7 Oct — Match Report
Cucine Lube Civitanova	3
Azimut Modena	1
7 Oct — Match Report
Diatec Trentino	1
Sir Safety Conad Perugia	3

Final
8 Oct — Match Report
Cucine Lube Civitanova	1
Sir Safety Conad Perugia	3

== Regular season ==
=== League table ===
Pos	Team	Pld	W	L	Pts	SW	SL	SR	SPW	SPL	SPR
1	Sir Safety Conad Perugia	26	23	3	70	71	17	4.176	2155	1817	1.186
2	Cucine Lube Civitanova	26	22	4	64	69	25	2.760	2241	1944	1.153
3	Azimut Modena	26	20	6	60	70	30	2.333	2374	2157	1.101
4	Diatec Trentino	26	18	8	51	60	42	1.429	2355	2213	1.064
5	Calzedonia Verona	26	18	8	50	59	41	1.439	2287	2231	1.025
6	Revivre Milano	26	14	12	44	56	44	1.273	2276	2204	1.033
7	Wixo LPR Piacenza	26	15	11	42	56	51	1.098	2388	2355	1.014
8	Bunge Ravenna	26	14	12	41	48	46	1.043	2129	2111	1.009
9	Kioene Padova	26	11	15	35	45	52	0.865	2163	2229	0.970
10	Gi Group Monza	26	9	17	28	41	60	0.683	2186	2274	0.961
11	Top Volley Latina	26	7	19	25	41	61	0.672	2208	2327	0.949
12	Tonno Callipo Calabria Vibo Valentia	26	4	22	13	28	73	0.384	2102	2385	0.881
13	Biosì Indexa Sora	26	4	22	13	24	70	0.343	1994	2267	0.880
14	BCC Castellana Grotte	26	3	23	10	18	74	0.243	1879	2223	0.845

=== Results table ===
	MOD	CAS	SOR	RAV	VER	TRE	MON	PAD	CIV	MIL	PER	VAL	LAT	PIA
Azimut Modena		3–0	3–1	3–0	3–0	2–3	3–0	1–3	1–3	3–2	3–2	3–2	3–0	3–0
BCC Castellana	0–3		2–3	0–3	0–3	1–3	3–2	0–3	3–2	0–3	0–3	2–3	3–1	0–3
Globo Sora	0–3	3–1		2–3	0–3	1–3	0–3	1–3	0–3	0–3	1–3	3–1	2–3	1–3
Bunge Ravenna	0–3	3–0	3–0		3–2	3–0	3–0	3–1	0–3	0–3	0–3	3–1	3–0	2–3
Calzedonia Verona	1–3	3–0	3–1	3–2		1–3	3–1	3–0	0–3	3–1	0–3	3–0	3–1	3–2
Diatec Trentino	3–2	3–1	3–0	3–1	1–3		3–1	3–0	1–3	2–3	0–3	3–0	3–2	3–0
Gi Group Monza	2–3	3–0	3–1	3–1	1–3	3–2		3–1	1–3	1–3	0–3	1–3	3–1	2–3
Kioene Padova	1–3	3–0	3–0	2–3	2–3	1–3	3–1		0–3	0–3	1–3	3–1	3–0	0–3
Lube Civitanova	0–3	3–0	3–0	3–0	3–0	3–0	3–0	3–2		3–1	3–0	3–1	3–0	3–2
Revivre Milano	3–2	3–0	3–0	1–3	0–3	2–3	3–1	3–1	1–3		1–3	3–1	2–3	2–3
Sir Conad Perugia	0–3	3–0	3–0	3–0	3–1	3–0	3–0	3–0	3–1	3–0		3–0	3–1	3–1
T.Callipo Vibo Valentia	0–3	3–2	0–3	0–3	1–3	2–3	2–3	0–3	1–3	0–3	0–3		3–2	1–3
Top Volley Latina	1–3	3–0	3–0	3–0	2–3	1–3	1–3	2–3	3–0	0–3	1–3	3–0		2–3
Wixo LPR Piacenza	3–2	3–0	3–1	1–3	2–3	0–3	3–0	1–3	2–3	3–1	0–3	3–2	3–2	

Legend: Blue = left column team win; Red = top row team win.

=== 1st Round 1st Half ===
Date	Time		Score		Set 1	Set 2	Set 3	Set 4	Set 5	Total	Report
15 Oct	18:00	Diatec Trentino	2–3	Revivre Milano	22–25	25–20	20–25	25–19	13–15	105–104	
15 Oct	18:00	Sir Safety Conad Perugia	3–0	Kioene Padova	25–17	25–16	25–22	–	–	75–55	
15 Oct	18:00	Azimut Modena	3–0	BCC Castellana Grotte	25–16	25–15	26–24	–	–	76–55	
15 Oct	18:00	Gi Group Monza	3–1	Biosì Indexa Sora	17–25	25–17	25–16	25–21	–	92–79	
15 Oct	18:00	Tonno Callipo Calabria Vibo Valentia	1–3	Cucine Lube Civitanova	23–25	22–25	25–22	23–25	–	93–97	
15 Oct	18:00	Bunge Ravenna	2–3	Wixo LPR Piacenza	25–22	25–13	16–25	22–25	15–17	103–102	
15 Oct	18:00	Taiwan Excellence Latina	2–3	Calzedonia Verona	22–25	22–25	25–22	25–19	17–19	111–110	

=== 2nd Round 1st Half ===
Date	Time		Score		Set 1	Set 2	Set 3	Set 4	Set 5	Total	Report
22 Nov	20:30	Cucine Lube Civitanova	3–0	Bunge Ravenna	25–14	25–20	26–24	–	–	76–58	
22 Oct	18:00	Calzedonia Verona	0–3	Sir Safety Conad Perugia	16–25	21–25	19–25	–	–	56–75	
22 Oct	18:00	Wixo LPR Piacenza	3–2	Tonno Callipo Calabria Vibo Valentia	23–25	25–20	25–23	24–26	15–10	112–104	
22 Oct	18:00	Kioene Padova	1–3	Diatec Trentino	21–25	19–25	25–17	23–25	–	88–92	
22 Oct	18:00	Biosì Indexa Sora	0–3	Azimut Modena	22–25	23–25	22–25	–	–	67–75	
22 Oct	18:00	Revivre Milano	3–1	Gi Group Monza	25–20	25–23	20–25	25–21	–	95–89	
22 Oct	18:00	BCC Castellana Grotte	3–1	Taiwan Excellence Latina	25–22	20–25	25–17	25–22	–	95–86	

=== 3rd Round 1st Half ===
Date	Time		Score		Set 1	Set 2	Set 3	Set 4	Set 5	Total	Report
25 Oct	20:30	Azimut Modena	3–0	Gi Group Monza	25–22	25–14	25–19	–	–	75–55	
25 Oct	20:30	Wixo LPR Piacenza	0–3	Sir Safety Conad Perugia	22–25	24–26	22–25	–	–	68–76	
25 Oct	20:30	Tonno Callipo Calabria Vibo Valentia	0–3	Kioene Padova	23–25	13–25	20–25	–	–	56–75	
25 Oct	20:30	Bunge Ravenna	3–0	Diatec Trentino	31–29	25–15	25–21	–	–	81–65	
25 Oct	20:30	Biosì Indexa Sora	2–3	Taiwan Excellence Latina	15–25	13–25	25–19	25–23	9–15	87–107	
26 Oct	20:30	Revivre Milano	1–3	Cucine Lube Civitanova	24–26	22–25	26–24	22–25	–	94–100	
13 Dec	20:30	BCC Castellana Grotte	0–3	Calzedonia Verona	23–25	20–25	17–25	–	–	60–75	

=== 4th Round 1st Half ===
Date	Time		Score		Set 1	Set 2	Set 3	Set 4	Set 5	Total	Report
28 Oct	20:30	Diatec Trentino	3–1	BCC Castellana Grotte	23–25	25–22	25–19	25–16	–	98–82	
29 Oct	18:00	Sir Safety Conad Perugia	3–0	Revivre Milano	25–19	25–20	25–23	–	–	75–62	
29 Oct	18:00	Azimut Modena	3–0	Wixo LPR Piacenza	25–15	25–19	25–23	–	–	75–57	
29 Oct	17:30	Gi Group Monza	1–3	Tonno Callipo Calabria Vibo Valentia	25–22	23–25	23–25	21–25	–	92–97	
29 Oct	18:00	Bunge Ravenna	3–0	Biosì Indexa Sora	25–18	25–18	25–18	–	–	75–54	
29 Oct	18:00	Taiwan Excellence Latina	3–0	Cucine Lube Civitanova	25–21	25–22	28–26	–	–	78–69	
29 Oct	18:00	Kioene Padova	2–3	Calzedonia Verona	20–25	25–22	21–25	29–27	12–15	107–114	

=== 5th Round 1st Half ===
Date	Time		Score		Set 1	Set 2	Set 3	Set 4	Set 5	Total	Report
1 Nov	18:00	Cucine Lube Civitanova	3–0	Diatec Trentino	25–22	30–28	29–27	–	–	84–77	
1 Nov	18:00	Sir Safety Conad Perugia	3–0	Gi Group Monza	25–21	25–16	25–11	–	–	75–48	
1 Nov	18:00	Calzedonia Verona	1–3	Azimut Modena	25–23	18–25	21–25	20–25	–	84–98	
2 Nov	20:30	Taiwan Excellence Latina	2–3	Wixo LPR Piacenza	25–21	25–20	22–25	19–25	12–15	103–106	
1 Nov	18:00	Kioene Padova	3–0	Biosì Indexa Sora	25–22	25–13	25–23	–	–	75–58	
1 Nov	18:00	Revivre Milano	1–3	Bunge Ravenna	25–19	20–25	17–25	23–25	–	85–94	
1 Nov	18:00	BCC Castellana Grotte	2–3	Tonno Callipo Calabria Vibo Valentia	27–25	25–20	24–26	21–25	14–16	111–112	

=== 6th Round 1st Half ===
Date	Time		Score		Set 1	Set 2	Set 3	Set 4	Set 5	Total	Report
5 Nov	18:00	Diatec Trentino	1–3	Calzedonia Verona	21–25	21–25	25–17	22–25	–	89–92	
5 Nov	18:15	Azimut Modena	1–3	Cucine Lube Civitanova	25–21	19–25	23–25	21–25	–	88–96	
5 Nov	18:00	Wixo LPR Piacenza	3–1	Revivre Milano	25–23	18–25	27–25	32–30	–	102–103	
5 Nov	18:00	Gi Group Monza	3–0	BCC Castellana Grotte	25–20	25–21	26–24	–	–	76–65	
5 Nov	18:00	Tonno Callipo Calabria Vibo Valentia	3–2	Taiwan Excellence Latina	25–17	19–25	23–25	25–22	15–13	107–102	
5 Nov	18:00	Bunge Ravenna	3–1	Kioene Padova	23–25	25–13	25–21	25–19	–	98–78	
5 Nov	18:00	Biosì Indexa Sora	1–3	Sir Safety Conad Perugia	20–25	26–28	25–21	21–25	–	92–99	

=== 7th Round 1st Half ===
Date	Time		Score		Set 1	Set 2	Set 3	Set 4	Set 5	Total	Report
12 Nov	18:00	Cucine Lube Civitanova	3–0	Biosì Indexa Sora	25–21	25–16	25–15	–	–	75–52	
15 Nov	20:30	Sir Safety Conad Perugia	3–0	Diatec Trentino	25–21	26–24	30–28	–	–	81–73	
12 Nov	18:00	Calzedonia Verona	3–2	Bunge Ravenna	25–23	30–28	22–25	22–25	20–18	119–119	
12 Nov	18:00	Taiwan Excellence Latina	1–3	Azimut Modena	24–26	25–22	32–34	16–25	–	97–107	
12 Nov	18:00	Kioene Padova	3–1	Gi Group Monza	25–8	17–25	36–34	25–22	–	103–89	
10 Nov	20:45	Revivre Milano	3–1	Tonno Callipo Calabria Vibo Valentia	23–25	25–22	25–22	25–22	–	98–91	
8 Nov	20:30	BCC Castellana Grotte	0–3	Wixo LPR Piacenza	20–25	23–25	22–25	–	–	65–75	

=== 8th Round 1st Half ===
Date	Time		Score		Set 1	Set 2	Set 3	Set 4	Set 5	Total	Report
23 Nov	20:30	Diatec Trentino	3–2	Taiwan Excellence Latina	23–25	22–25	25–20	25–20	15–10	110–100	
19 Nov	18:00	Azimut Modena	3–2	Revivre Milano	25–19	21–25	25–21	26–28	15–11	112–104	
19 Nov	18:00	Wixo LPR Piacenza	1–3	Kioene Padova	20–25	24–26	25–17	20–25	–	89–93	
19 Nov	18:00	Gi Group Monza	1–3	Cucine Lube Civitanova	20–25	22–25	25–20	23–25	–	90–95	
19 Nov	18:00	Tonno Callipo Calabria Vibo Valentia	0–3	Sir Safety Conad Perugia	13–25	23–25	23–25	–	–	59–75	
17 Nov	20:30	Bunge Ravenna	3–0	BCC Castellana Grotte	25–19	25–19	25–23	–	–	75–61	
19 Nov	18:00	Biosì Indexa Sora	0–3	Calzedonia Verona	20–25	27–29	23–25	–	–	70–79	

=== 9th Round 1st Half ===
Date	Time		Score		Set 1	Set 2	Set 3	Set 4	Set 5	Total	Report
26 Nov	17:00	Cucine Lube Civitanova	3–0	Sir Safety Conad Perugia	28–26	25–15	25–21	–	–	78–62	
26 Nov	18:00	Calzedonia Verona	3–1	Gi Group Monza	25–23	25–17	19–25	25–21	–	94–86	
26 Nov	18:00	Wixo LPR Piacenza	0–3	Diatec Trentino	10–25	21–25	20–25	–	–	51–75	
24 Nov	20:30	Tonno Callipo Calabria Vibo Valentia	0–3	Azimut Modena	21–25	23–25	22–25	–	–	66–75	
26 Nov	18:00	Taiwan Excellence Latina	3–0	Bunge Ravenna	25–19	25–22	25–19	–	–	75–60	
26 Nov	18:00	Revivre Milano	3–0	Biosì Indexa Sora	25–21	25–19	25–20	–	–	75–60	
28 Nov	20:30	BCC Castellana Grotte	0–3	Kioene Padova	21–25	23–25	28–30	–	–	72–80	

=== 10th Round 1st Half ===
Date	Time		Score		Set 1	Set 2	Set 3	Set 4	Set 5	Total	Report
3 Dec	18:00	Diatec Trentino	3–2	Azimut Modena	22–25	28–26	23–25	27–25	15–11	115–112	
3 Dec	18:00	Sir Safety Conad Perugia	3–0	BCC Castellana Grotte	25–17	29–27	25–11	–	–	79–55	
3 Dec	18:00	Calzedonia Verona	0–3	Cucine Lube Civitanova	12–25	20–25	18–25	–	–	50–75	
2 Dec	20:30	Gi Group Monza	3–1	Taiwan Excellence Latina	25–18	25–19	27–29	25–18	–	102–84	
2 Dec	20:30	Bunge Ravenna	3–1	Tonno Callipo Calabria Vibo Valentia	23–25	25–23	25–20	25–13	–	98–81	
3 Dec	18:00	Kioene Padova	0–3	Revivre Milano	22–25	13–25	13–25	–	–	48–75	
3 Dec	18:00	Biosì Indexa Sora	1–3	Wixo LPR Piacenza	17–25	21–25	25–23	23–25	–	86–98	

=== 11th Round 1st Half ===
Date	Time		Score		Set 1	Set 2	Set 3	Set 4	Set 5	Total	Report
9 Dec	18:00	Cucine Lube Civitanova	3–2	Kioene Padova	25–21	26–28	25–21	24–26	16–14	116–110	
10 Dec	18:00	Azimut Modena	3–0	Bunge Ravenna	25–21	25–19	25–18	–	–	75–58	
10 Dec	18:00	Wixo LPR Piacenza	3–0	Gi Group Monza	25–23	25–15	25–18	–	–	75–56	
10 Dec	18:00	Tonno Callipo Calabria Vibo Valentia	2–3	Diatec Trentino	20–25	25–22	25–27	27–25	12–15	109–114	
10 Dec	18:00	Taiwan Excellence Latina	1–3	Sir Safety Conad Perugia	39–41	25–20	15–25	17–25	–	96–111	
10 Dec	18:00	Revivre Milano	0–3	Calzedonia Verona	15–25	22–25	17–25	–	–	54–75	
10 Dec	18:00	BCC Castellana Grotte	2–3	Biosì Indexa Sora	25–21	22–25	26–28	25–18	17–19	115–111	

=== 12th Round 1st Half ===
Date	Time		Score		Set 1	Set 2	Set 3	Set 4	Set 5	Total	Report
16 Nov	20:30	Cucine Lube Civitanova	3–2	Wixo LPR Piacenza	25–22	18–25	22–25	25–18	15–12	105–102	
17 Dec	18:00	Sir Safety Conad Perugia	0–3	Azimut Modena	22–25	23–25	21–25	–	–	66–75	
16 Dec	20:30	Calzedonia Verona	3–0	Tonno Callipo Calabria Vibo Valentia	25–19	25–21	25–22	–	–	75–62	
17 Dec	18:00	Gi Group Monza	3–1	Bunge Ravenna	20–25	25–19	25–17	25–21	–	95–82	
17 Dec	18:00	Kioene Padova	3–0	Taiwan Excellence Latina	25–20	25–23	25–23	–	–	75–66	
13 Dec	20:30	Biosì Indexa Sora	1–3	Diatec Trentino	13–25	19–25	25–18	22–25	–	79–93	
17 Dec	18:00	Revivre Milano	3–0	BCC Castellana Grotte	25–16	25–20	25–13	–	–	75–49	

=== 13th Round 1st Half ===
Date	Time		Score		Set 1	Set 2	Set 3	Set 4	Set 5	Total	Report
26 Dec	18:15	Diatec Trentino	3–1	Gi Group Monza	19–25	25–21	25–14	25–19	–	94–79	
26 Dec	18:00	Azimut Modena	1–3	Kioene Padova	21–25	25–27	25–21	16–25	–	87–98	
26 Dec	18:00	Wixo LPR Piacenza	2–3	Calzedonia Verona	25–22	16–25	21–25	27–25	8–15	97–112	
26 Dec	18:00	Tonno Callipo Calabria Vibo Valentia	0–3	Biosì Indexa Sora	21–25	19–25	20–25	–	–	60–75	
26 Dec	18:00	Bunge Ravenna	0–3	Sir Safety Conad Perugia	22–25	16–25	18–25	–	–	56–75	
26 Dec	18:00	Taiwan Excellence Latina	0–3	Revivre Milano	18–25	20–25	20–25	–	–	58–75	
26 Dec	18:00	BCC Castellana Grotte	3–2	Cucine Lube Civitanova	15–25	25–21	23–25	25–17	15–10	103–98	

=== 2nd Round 1st Half ===
Date	Time		Score		Set 1	Set 2	Set 3	Set 4	Set 5	Total	Report
30 Dec	16:30	Revivre Milano	2–3	Diatec Trentino	25–22	25–22	22–25	14–25	13–15	99–109	
30 Dec	18:15	Kioene Padova	1–3	Sir Safety Conad Perugia	25–20	22–25	15–25	14–25	–	76–95	
30 Dec	18:00	BCC Castellana Grotte	0–3	Azimut Modena	21–25	18–25	28–30	–	–	67–80	
30 Dec	18:00	Biosì Indexa Sora	0–3	Gi Group Monza	25–27	17–25	20–25	–	–	62–77	
30 Dec	18:00	Cucine Lube Civitanova	3–1	Tonno Callipo Calabria Vibo Valentia	25–18	20–25	25–10	25–12	–	95–65	
30 Dec	18:00	Wixo LPR Piacenza	1–3	Bunge Ravenna	21–25	18–25	35–33	24–26	–	98–109	
25 Jan	20:00	Calzedonia Verona	3–1	Taiwan Excellence Latina	25–18	25–19	21–25	25–22	–	96–84	

=== 2nd Round 2nd Half ===
Date	Time		Score		Set 1	Set 2	Set 3	Set 4	Set 5	Total	Report
4 Jan	20:30	Bunge Ravenna	0–3	Cucine Lube Civitanova	17–25	20–25	9–25	–	–	46–75	
4 Jan	20:30	Sir Safety Conad Perugia	3–1	Calzedonia Verona	25–19	26–28	25–18	25–22	–	101–87	
4 Jan	20:30	Tonno Callipo Calabria Vibo Valentia	1–3	Wixo LPR Piacenza	23–25	25–23	18–25	19–25	–	85–98	
4 Jan	20:30	Diatec Trentino	3–0	Kioene Padova	25–14	27–25	25–17	–	–	77–56	
4 Jan	20:30	Azimut Modena	3–1	Biosì Indexa Sora	25–27	25–15	25–20	25–20	–	100–82	
4 Jan	20:30	Gi Group Monza	1–3	Revivre Milano	25–14	23–25	21–25	16–25	–	85–89	
4 Jan	20:30	Taiwan Excellence Latina	3–0	BCC Castellana Grotte	25–16	25–15	25–20	–	–	75–51	

=== 3rd Round 2nd Half ===
Date	Time		Score		Set 1	Set 2	Set 3	Set 4	Set 5	Total	Report
7 Jan	18:00	Gi Group Monza	2–3	Azimut Modena	18–25	25–18	19–25	25–22	13–15	100–105	
7 Jan	18:00	Sir Safety Conad Perugia	3–1	Wixo LPR Piacenza	25–21	19–25	25–18	25–19	–	94–83	
7 Jan	18:00	Kioene Padova	3–1	Tonno Callipo Calabria Vibo Valentia	25–18	23–25	25–21	25–16	–	98–80	
7 Jan	18:00	Diatec Trentino	3–1	Bunge Ravenna	25–18	22–25	25–19	25–20	–	97–82	
7 Jan	18:00	Taiwan Excellence Latina	3–0	Biosì Indexa Sora	25–19	25–22	25–20	–	–	75–61	
7 Jan	18:00	Cucine Lube Civitanova	3–1	Revivre Milano	25–18	23–25	25–21	25–19	–	98–83	
7 Jan	18:00	Calzedonia Verona	3–0	BCC Castellana Grotte	26–24	25–20	25–22	–	–	76–66	

=== 4th Round 2nd Half ===
Date	Time		Score		Set 1	Set 2	Set 3	Set 4	Set 5	Total	Report
24 Jan	20:30	BCC Castellana Grotte	1–3	Diatec Trentino	25–23	22–25	25–27	16–25	–	88–100	
10 Jan	20:30	Revivre Milano	1–3	Sir Safety Conad Perugia	20–25	25–23	20–25	22–25	–	87–98	
10 Jan	20:30	Wixo LPR Piacenza	3–2	Azimut Modena	29–27	17–25	23–25	25–23	15–12	109–112	
10 Jan	20:30	Tonno Callipo Calabria Vibo Valentia	2–3	Gi Group Monza	23–25	17–25	25–17	25–23	14–16	104–106	
10 Jan	20:30	Biosì Indexa Sora	2–3	Bunge Ravenna	36–34	16–25	22–25	25–20	12–15	111–119	
10 Jan	20:30	Cucine Lube Civitanova	3–0	Taiwan Excellence Latina	25–22	25–16	25–16	–	–	75–54	
11 Jan	20:30	Calzedonia Verona	3–0	Kioene Padova	25–20	25–16	25–21	–	–	75–57	

=== 5th Round 2nd Half ===
Date	Time		Score		Set 1	Set 2	Set 3	Set 4	Set 5	Total	Report
14 Jan	18:00	Diatec Trentino	1–3	Cucine Lube Civitanova	13–25	26–28	25–20	14–25	–	78–98	
13 Jan	20:30	Gi Group Monza	0–3	Sir Safety Conad Perugia	22–25	18–25	20–25	–	–	60–75	
14 Jan	18:00	Azimut Modena	3–0	Calzedonia Verona	25–21	25–20	25–15	–	–	75–56	
14 Jan	18:00	Wixo LPR Piacenza	3–2	Taiwan Excellence Latina	18–25	25–23	24–26	25–21	15–12	107–107	
14 Jan	18:00	Biosì Indexa Sora	1–3	Kioene Padova	23–25	28–30	25–23	21–25	–	97–103	
14 Jan	18:00	Bunge Ravenna	0–3	Revivre Milano	21–25	25–27	20–25	–	–	66–77	
14 Jan	18:00	Tonno Callipo Calabria Vibo Valentia	3–2	BCC Castellana Grotte	23–25	23–25	25–22	25–21	15–9	111–102	

=== 6th Round 2nd Half ===
Date	Time		Score		Set 1	Set 2	Set 3	Set 4	Set 5	Total	Report
21 Jan	18:00	Calzedonia Verona	1–3	Diatec Trentino	20–25	23–25	25–19	20–25	–	88–94	
21 Jan	18:00	Cucine Lube Civitanova	0–3	Azimut Modena	23–25	21–25	19–25	–	–	63–75	
20 Jan	20:30	Revivre Milano	2–3	Wixo LPR Piacenza	25–23	25–22	20–25	26–28	11–15	107–113	
21 Jan	18:00	BCC Castellana Grotte	3–2	Gi Group Monza	25–22	19–25	29–27	20–25	15–8	108–107	
19 Jan	20:30	Taiwan Excellence Latina	3–0	Tonno Callipo Calabria Vibo Valentia	25–23	25–17	25–20	–	–	75–60	
21 Jan	18:00	Kioene Padova	2–3	Bunge Ravenna	24–26	25–19	22–25	32–30	13–15	116–115	
21 Jan	18:00	Sir Safety Conad Perugia	3–0	Biosì Indexa Sora	25–18	25–23	26–24	–	–	76–65	

=== 7th Round 2nd Half ===
Date	Time		Score		Set 1	Set 2	Set 3	Set 4	Set 5	Total	Report
4 Feb	18:00	Biosì Indexa Sora	0–3	Cucine Lube Civitanova	13–25	20–25	19–25	–	–	52–75	
4 Feb	18:00	Diatec Trentino	0–3	Sir Safety Conad Perugia	23–25	21–25	19–25	–	–	63–75	
4 Feb	18:00	Bunge Ravenna	3–2	Calzedonia Verona	29–27	13–25	29–27	22–25	15–9	108–113	
4 Feb	18:00	Azimut Modena	3–0	Taiwan Excellence Latina	28–26	25–17	28–26	–	–	81–69	
4 Feb	18:00	Gi Group Monza	3–1	Kioene Padova	26–28	25–14	25–20	25–19	–	101–81	
2 Feb	20:30	Tonno Callipo Calabria Vibo Valentia	0–3	Revivre Milano	17–25	24–26	23–25	–	–	64–76	
4 Feb	18:00	Wixo LPR Piacenza	3–0	BCC Castellana Grotte	25–14	25–17	25–17	–	–	75–48	

=== 8th Round 2nd Half ===
Date	Time		Score		Set 1	Set 2	Set 3	Set 4	Set 5	Total	Report
7 Feb	20:30	Taiwan Excellence Latina	1–3	Diatec Trentino	25–21	20–25	18–25	18–25	–	81–96	
7 Feb	20:30	Revivre Milano	3–2	Azimut Modena	22–25	25–16	23–25	25–16	20–18	115–100	
7 Feb	20:30	Kioene Padova	0–3	Wixo LPR Piacenza	19–25	19–25	22–25	–	–	60–75	
7 Feb	20:30	Cucine Lube Civitanova	3–0	Gi Group Monza	25–22	25–16	25–18	–	–	75–56	
7 Feb	20:30	Sir Safety Conad Perugia	3–0	Tonno Callipo Calabria Vibo Valentia	25–20	25–18	25–21	–	–	75–59	
8 Feb	20:30	BCC Castellana Grotte	0–3	Bunge Ravenna	19–25	20–25	35–37	–	–	74–87	
7 Feb	20:30	Calzedonia Verona	3–1	Biosì Indexa Sora	23–25	25–20	27–25	31–29	–	106–99	

=== 9th Round 2nd Half ===
Date	Time		Score		Set 1	Set 2	Set 3	Set 4	Set 5	Total	Report
10 Feb	20:30	Sir Safety Conad Perugia	3–1	Cucine Lube Civitanova	23–25	25–22	25–19	25–20	–	98–86	
11 Feb	18:00	Gi Group Monza	1–3	Calzedonia Verona	21–25	25–16	20–25	23–25	–	89–91	
11 Feb	18:00	Diatec Trentino	3–0	Wixo LPR Piacenza	25–22	25–19	27–25	–	–	77–66	
11 Feb	18:00	Azimut Modena	3–2	Tonno Callipo Calabria Vibo Valentia	29–31	20–25	25–14	25–21	17–15	116–106	
11 Feb	18:00	Bunge Ravenna	3–0	Taiwan Excellence Latina	25–17	25–18	28–26	–	–	78–61	
11 Feb	18:00	Biosì Indexa Sora	0–3	Revivre Milano	22–25	22–25	16–25	–	–	60–75	
11 Feb	18:00	Kioene Padova	3–0	BCC Castellana Grotte	25–13	25–21	25–17	–	–	75–51	

=== 10th Round 2nd Half ===
Date	Time		Score		Set 1	Set 2	Set 3	Set 4	Set 5	Total	Report
18 Feb	18:00	Azimut Modena	2–3	Diatec Trentino	28–26	26–28	22–25	25–17	13–15	114–111	
18 Feb	18:00	BCC Castellana Grotte	0–3	Sir Safety Conad Perugia	21–25	18–25	12–25	–	–	51–75	
18 Feb	18:00	Cucine Lube Civitanova	3–0	Calzedonia Verona	27–25	25–19	25–19	–	–	77–63	
18 Feb	18:00	Taiwan Excellence Latina	1–3	Gi Group Monza	14–25	26–24	20–25	24–26	–	84–100	
18 Feb	18:00	Tonno Callipo Calabria Vibo Valentia	0–3	Bunge Ravenna	12–25	22–25	12–25	–	–	46–75	
18 Feb	18:00	Revivre Milano	3–1	Kioene Padova	25–18	26–24	24–26	28–26	–	103–94	
18 Feb	18:00	Wixo LPR Piacenza	3–1	Biosì Indexa Sora	25–12	25–21	21–25	25–22	–	96–80	

=== 11th Round 2nd Half ===
Date	Time		Score		Set 1	Set 2	Set 3	Set 4	Set 5	Total	Report
21 Feb	20:30	Kioene Padova	0–3	Cucine Lube Civitanova	18–25	19–25	22–25	–	–	59–75	
21 Feb	20:30	Bunge Ravenna	0–3	Azimut Modena	18–25	27–29	19–25	–	–	64–79	
21 Feb	20:30	Gi Group Monza	2–3	Wixo LPR Piacenza	25–21	27–25	21–25	20–25	8–15	101–111	
21 Feb	20:30	Diatec Trentino	3–0	Tonno Callipo Calabria Vibo Valentia	25–16	25–19	25–21	–	–	75–56	
21 Feb	20:30	Sir Safety Conad Perugia	3–1	Taiwan Excellence Latina	16–25	25–16	25–21	25–10	–	91–72	
21 Feb	20:30	Calzedonia Verona	3–1	Revivre Milano	25–17	20–25	25–21	25–20	–	95–83	
21 Feb	20:30	Biosì Indexa Sora	3–1	BCC Castellana Grotte	21–25	25–20	25–20	25–16	–	96–81	

=== 12th Round 2nd Half ===
Date	Time		Score		Set 1	Set 2	Set 3	Set 4	Set 5	Total	Report
25 Feb	18:00	Wixo LPR Piacenza	2–3	Cucine Lube Civitanova	25–19	26–28	25–23	19–25	13–15	108–110	
25 Feb	18:00	Azimut Modena	3–2	Sir Safety Conad Perugia	21–25	25–20	25–20	21–25	15–13	107–103	
24 Feb	18:00	Tonno Callipo Calabria Vibo Valentia	1–3	Calzedonia Verona	15–25	25–22	21–25	19–25	–	80–97	
25 Feb	18:00	Bunge Ravenna	3–0	Gi Group Monza	25–12	25–17	25–19	–	–	75–48	
25 Feb	18:00	Taiwan Excellence Latina	2–3	Kioene Padova	20–25	25–22	25–22	17–25	11–15	98–109	
25 Feb	18:00	Diatec Trentino	3–0	Biosì Indexa Sora	25–15	27–25	25–21	–	–	77–61	
25 Feb	18:00	BCC Castellana Grotte	0–3	Revivre Milano	19–25	15–25	20–25	–	–	54–75	

=== 13th Round 2nd Half ===
Date	Time		Score		Set 1	Set 2	Set 3	Set 4	Set 5	Total	Report
4 Mar	18:00	Gi Group Monza	3–2	Diatec Trentino	23–25	25–18	27–25	17–25	15–8	107–101	
4 Mar	18:00	Kioene Padova	1–3	Azimut Modena	21–25	26–24	24–26	23–25	–	94–100	
4 Mar	18:00	Calzedonia Verona	3–2	Wixo LPR Piacenza	22–25	16–25	31–29	25–23	15–13	109–115	
4 Mar	18:00	Biosì Indexa Sora	3–1	Tonno Callipo Calabria Vibo Valentia	25–19	25–21	22–25	26–24	–	98–89	
4 Mar	18:00	Sir Safety Conad Perugia	3–0	Bunge Ravenna	25–15	25–14	25–19	–	–	75–48	
4 Mar	18:00	Revivre Milano	2–3	Taiwan Excellence Latina	30–32	18–25	25–16	25–22	10–15	108–110	
4 Mar	18:00	Cucine Lube Civitanova	3–0	BCC Castellana Grotte	25–22	25–16	25–12	–	–	75–50	

== Play-offs ==
Quarterfinals
1	Sir Safety Conad Perugia	3	2	3
8	Bunge Ravenna	1	3	0
4	Diatec Trentino	3	2	3
5	Calzedonia Verona	2	3	0
2	Cucine Lube Civitanova	3	3	X
7	Wixo LPR Piacenza	0	2	X
3	Azimut Modena	3	3	X
6	Revivre Milano	2	1	X

Semifinals
1	Sir Safety Conad Perugia	3	2	3	0	3
4	Diatec Trentino	1	3	2	3	0
2	Cucine Lube Civitanova	3	1	3	3	X
3	Azimut Modena	2	3	2	1	X

Finals
1	Sir Safety Conad Perugia	3	2	3	1	3
2	Cucine Lube Civitanova	1	3	1	3	0

=== Quarter-finals ===
- Best-of-three series

Date	Time		Score		Set 1	Set 2	Set 3	Set 4	Set 5	Total	Report
11 Mar	20:30	Sir Safety Conad Perugia	3–1	Bunge Ravenna	20–25	26–24	28–26	25–19		99–94	Report
18 Mar	18:00	Bunge Ravenna	3–2	Sir Safety Conad Perugia	20–25	25–23	27–25	29–31	15–12	116–116	Report
25 Mar	18:00	Sir Safety Conad Perugia	3–0	Bunge Ravenna	25–19	25–18	25–23			75–60	Report

Date	Time		Score		Set 1	Set 2	Set 3	Set 4	Set 5	Total	Report
11 Mar	18:00	Diatec Trentino	3–2	Calzedona Verona	25–23	25–17	19–25	24–26	15–13	108–104	Report
18 Mar	20:30	Calzedona Verona	3–2	Diatec Trentino	25–23	21–25	23–25	26–24	15–13	110–110	Report
25 Mar	18:00	Diatec Trentino	3–0	Calzedona Verona	25–20	25–22	25–15			75–57	Report

Date	Time		Score		Set 1	Set 2	Set 3	Set 4	Set 5	Total	Report
11 Mar	18:00	Cucine Lube Civitanova	3–0	Wixo LPR Piacenza	25–21	25–20	25–14			75–55	Report
18 Mar	18:00	Wixo LPR Piacenza	2–3	Cucine Lube Civitanova	25–16	11–25	11–25	25–22	13–15	85–103	Report

Date	Time		Score		Set 1	Set 2	Set 3	Set 4	Set 5	Total	Report
11 Mar	20:30	Azimut Modena	3–0	Revivre Milano	26–24	25–27	25–19	21–25	15–12	112–107	Report
18 Mar	18:15	Revivre Milano	1–3	Azimut Modena	27–25	21–25	19–25	19–25		86–100	Report

=== Semi-finals ===
- Best-of-five series

Date	Time		Score		Set 1	Set 2	Set 3	Set 4	Set 5	Total	Report
29 Mar	20:30	Sir Safety Conad Perugia	3–1	Diatec Trentino	25–23	18–25	25–23	25–22		93–93	Report
1 Apr	18:00	Diatec Trentino	3–2	Sir Safety Conad Perugia	26–24	13–25	19–25	25–23	15–10	98–107	Report
7 Apr	18:00	Sir Safety Conad Perugia	3–2	Diatec Trentino	25–27	25–13	21–25	25–27	15–13	111–105	Report
15 Apr	18:00	Diatec Trentino	3–0	Sir Safety Conad Perugia	25–22	26–24	25–23			76–69	Report
19 Apr	20:30	Sir Safety Conad Perugia	3–0	Diatec Trentino	25–12	25–20	30–28			80–60	Report

Date	Time		Score		Set 1	Set 2	Set 3	Set 4	Set 5	Total	Report
28 Mar	20:30	Cucine Lube Civitanova	3–2	Azimut Modena	25–22	21–25	25–16	21–25	15–13	107–101	Report
1 Apr	18:00	Azimut Modena	3–1	Cucine Lube Civitanova	25–16	29–27	22–25	25–23		101–91	Report
8 Apr	18:00	Cucine Lube Civitanova	3–2	Azimut Modena	27–25	33–35	25–16	22–25	21–19	128–120	Report
15 Apr	18:00	Azimut Modena	1–3	Cucine Lube Civitanova	19–25	25–19	20–25	28–30		92–99	Report

=== Finals ===
- Best-of-five series

Date	Time		Score		Set 1	Set 2	Set 3	Set 4	Set 5	Total	Report
22 Apr	18:00	Sir Safety Conad Perugia	3–1	Cucine Lube Civitanova	25–21	22–25	25–18	25–23		97–87	Report
25 Apr	19:30	Cucine Lube Civitanova	3–2	Sir Safety Conad Perugia	22–25	24–26	25–17	25–23	15–11	111–102	Report
28 Apr	20:30	Sir Safety Conad Perugia	3–1	Cucine Lube Civitanova	25–21	25–21	21–25	25–23		96–90	Report
1 May	18:00	Cucine Lube Civitanova	3–1	Sir Safety Conad Perugia	25–19	24–26	25–19	25-20		99–64	Report
6 May	18:00	Sir Safety Conad Perugia	3–0	Cucine Lube Civitanova	25–22	25–23	27–25			77–70	Report

== Final standing ==
Rank	Team
1st place, gold medalist(s)	Sir Safety Conad Perugia
2nd place, silver medalist(s)	Cucine Lube Civitanova
3rd place, bronze medalist(s)	Azimut Modena
4	Diatec Trentino
5	Gi Group Monza
6	Kioene Padova
7	Calzedonia Verona
8	Top Volley Latina
9	Revivre Milano
10	Wixo LPR Piacenza
11	Bunge Ravenna
12	Tonno Callipo Calabria Vibo Valentia
13	Biosì Indexa Sora
14	BCC Castellana Grotte

2018 Italian Champions
Sir Safety Conad Perugia
1st title

Fabio Ricci, Andrea Cesarini, James Shaw, Aaron Russell, Ivan Zaytsev, Dore Della Lunga, Tommi Siirilä, Alexander Berger, Massimo Colaci, Aleksandar Atanasijević, Luciano De Cecco (C), Leo Andric, Simone Anzani, Marko Podraščanin
Head coach
Lorenzo Bernardi
