= Denis Kaliberda =

German volleyball player (born 1990)

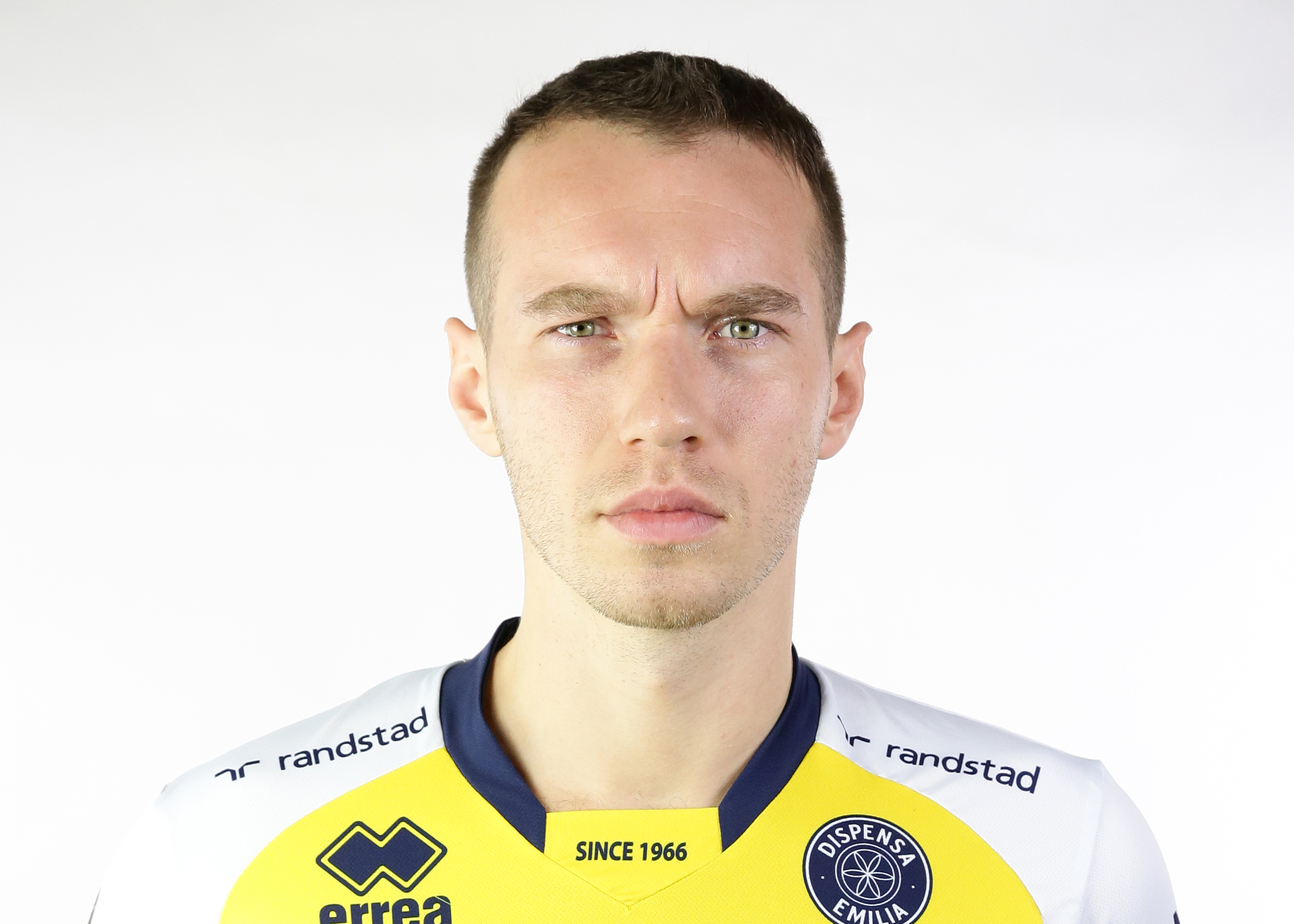

Personal information
- Full name: Denis Viktorovic Kaliberda
- Nationality: (Germany) German
- Born: 24 June 1990 (age 36); Poltava, Soviet Union, Ukraine
- Height: 1.93 m (6 ft 4 in)
- Weight: 95 kg (209 lb)
- Spike: 343 cm (135 in)
- Block: 314 cm (124 in)

Volleyball information
- Position: Outside hitter
- Current club: (Germany) Berlin Recycling Volleys
- Number: 14

Career
Years	Teams
2009–2012; 2012–2013; 2013–2014; 2014–2015; 2015–2016; 2016–2017; 2017–2018; 2018–2020; 2020–	(Germany) Generali Unterhaching (Italy) Volley Callipo (Italy) Volley Piacenza (Poland) Jastrzębski Węgiel (Italy) Sir Safety Perugia (Italy) Volley Lube (Turkey) Ziraat Bankası Ankara (Italy) Modena Volley (Germany) Berlin Recycling Volleys

National team
2008–	Germany
Honours
Men's volleyball
Representing Germany
FIVB World Championship
Bronze medal – third place	2014 Poland
CEV European Championship
Silver medal – second place	2017 Poland
European Games
Gold medal – first place	2015 Azerbaijan

Denis Viktorovic Kaliberda (Ukrainian: Денис Вікторович Каліберда, also transliterated Denys Viktorovich Kaliberda, born 24 June 1990) is a German volleyball player of Ukrainian origins, member of the Germany men's national volleyball team, bronze medallist of the 2014 World Championship. He was part of the German 2012 Olympic men's national volleyball team.

== Personal life ==
His father Viktor Kaliberda is a former volleyball player, member of the Ukraine men's national volleyball team.

== Sporting achievements ==
=== Clubs ===
- National championships
  - 2009/2010 German Cup, with Generali Unterhaching
  - 2009/2010 German Championship, with Generali Unterhaching
  - 2010/2011 German Cup, with Generali Unterhaching
  - 2011/2012 German Championship, with Generali Unterhaching
  - 2013/2014 Italian Cup, with Copra Elior Piacenza
  - 2013/2014 Italian Championship, with Copra Elior Piacenza
  - 2015/2016 Italian Championship, with Sir Safety Perugia
  - 2016/2017 Italian Cup, with Cucine Lube Civitanova
  - 2016/2017 Italian Championship, with Cucine Lube Civitanova
  - 2018/2019 Italian SuperCup, with Modena Volley

=== Youth national team ===
- 2008 CEV U20 European Championship

=== Individual awards ===
- 2017: CEV European Championship – Best outside spiker

Awards
Preceded by (Slovenia) Tine Urnaut (France) Earvin N'Gapeth	Best Outside Spiker of CEV European Championship; 2017 ex aequo (Russia) Dmitry Volkov	Succeeded by (Poland) Wilfredo León (Serbia) Uroš Kovačević
