= Georgi Seganov =

Bulgarian volleyball player (born 1993)

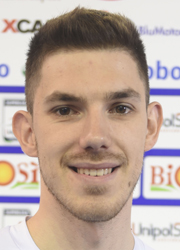
- Seganov in 2018

Personal information
- Born: 10 June 1993 (age 33); Razlog, Bulgaria
- Height: 1.98 m (6 ft 6 in)
- Weight: 83 kg (183 lb)
- Spike: 335 cm (132 in)
- Block: 325 cm (128 in)

Volleyball information
- Position: Setter
- Current club: Alanya Belediyespor

Career
Years	Teams
2014–2016; 2016–2018; 2018–2019; 2019–2020; 2020–2021; 2021–2022; 2022–2023; 2023–	CSKA Sofia; Argos Volley; Maliye Milli Piyango; Halkbank Ankara; Top Volley Cisterna; Cizre Belediyespor; GKS Katowice; Alanya Belediyespor

National team
2014–	Bulgaria

Georgi Seganov (Bulgarian: Георги Сеганов; born 10 June 1993) is a Bulgarian professional volleyball player who plays as a setter for Alanya Belediyespor and the Bulgaria national team. Seganov competed for his national team in the 2014 World Championship held in Poland.
