= Enrico Cester =

Italian male volleyball player

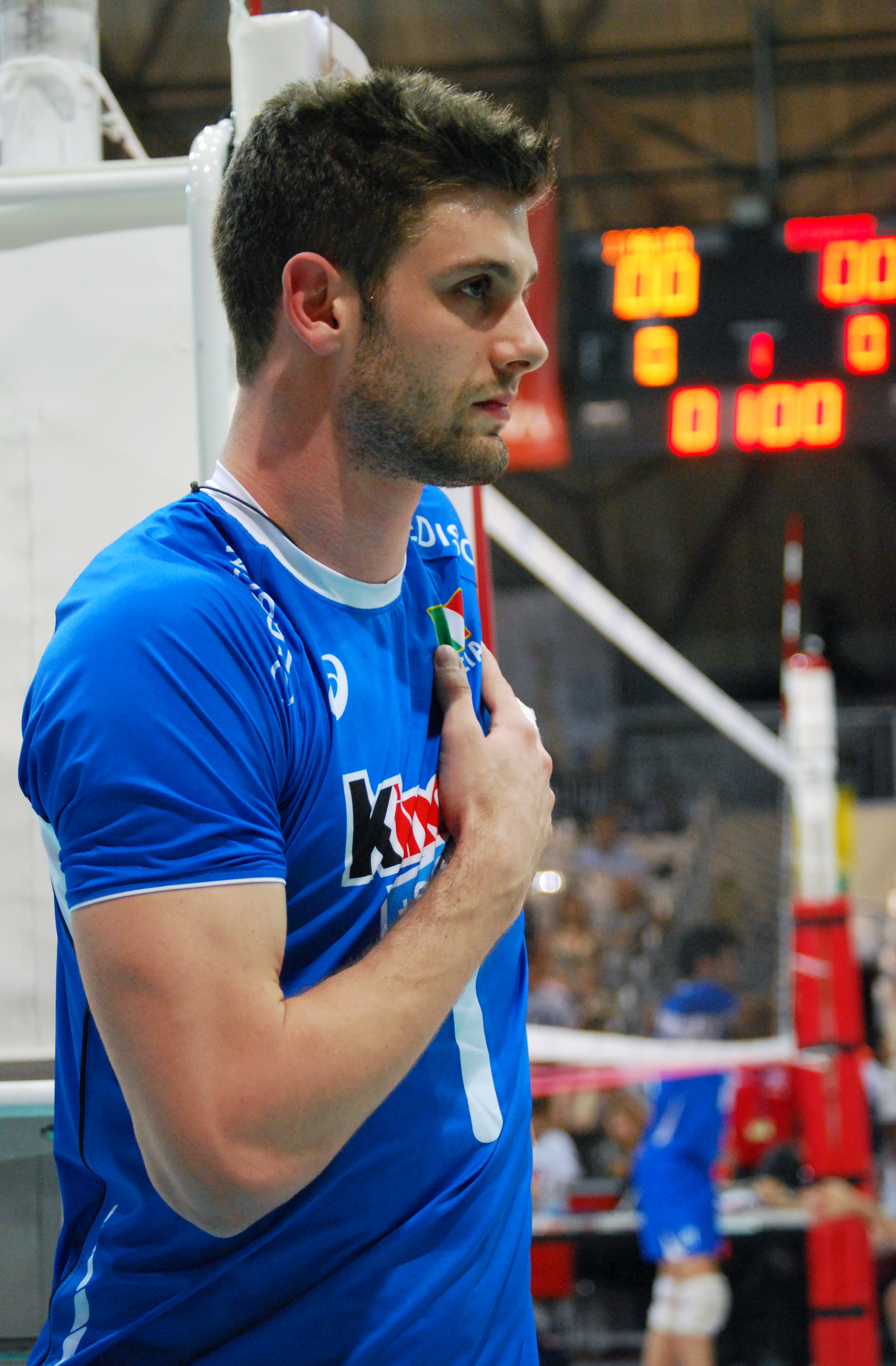

Personal information
- Nationality: Italian
- Born: 16 March 1988 (age 38); Motta di Livenza, Italy
- Height: 202 cm (6 ft 8 in)
- Weight: 93 kg (205 lb)
- Spike: 336 cm (132 in)
- Block: 321 cm (126 in)

Volleyball information
- Current club: Bluvolley Verona
- Number: 7 (national team)

Career
Years	Teams
2005–2008; 2008–2009; 2009–2010; 2010–2011; 2011–2012; 2012–2013; 2013–2015; 2015–	Volley Treviso; Pallavolo Città di Castello; Pallavolo Loreto; Umbria Volley; Top Volley Latina; New Mater Volley; G.S. Porto Robur Costa; Lube Civitanova

National team
2011–	Italy

Enrico Cester (born 16 March 1988) is an Italian male volleyball player. He was part of the Italy men's national volleyball team. On club level he plays for Cucine Lube Civitanova.

== Sporting achievements ==
=== Clubs ===
==== FIVB Club World Championship ====
- Poland 2017 – with Cucine Lube Civitanova
- Poland 2018 – with Cucine Lube Civitanova

Silver medal with Cucine Lube Civitanova- 2018

==== CEV Champions League ====
- 2015/2016 - with Cucine Lube Civitanova
- 2016/2017 - with Cucine Lube Civitanova

==== National championships ====
- 2016/2017 Italian Championship, with Cucine Lube Civitanova
- 2022/2023 Italian Cup, with Gas Sales Bluenergy Piacenza
