= Italian Volleyball Federation =

Governing body for volleyball in Italy

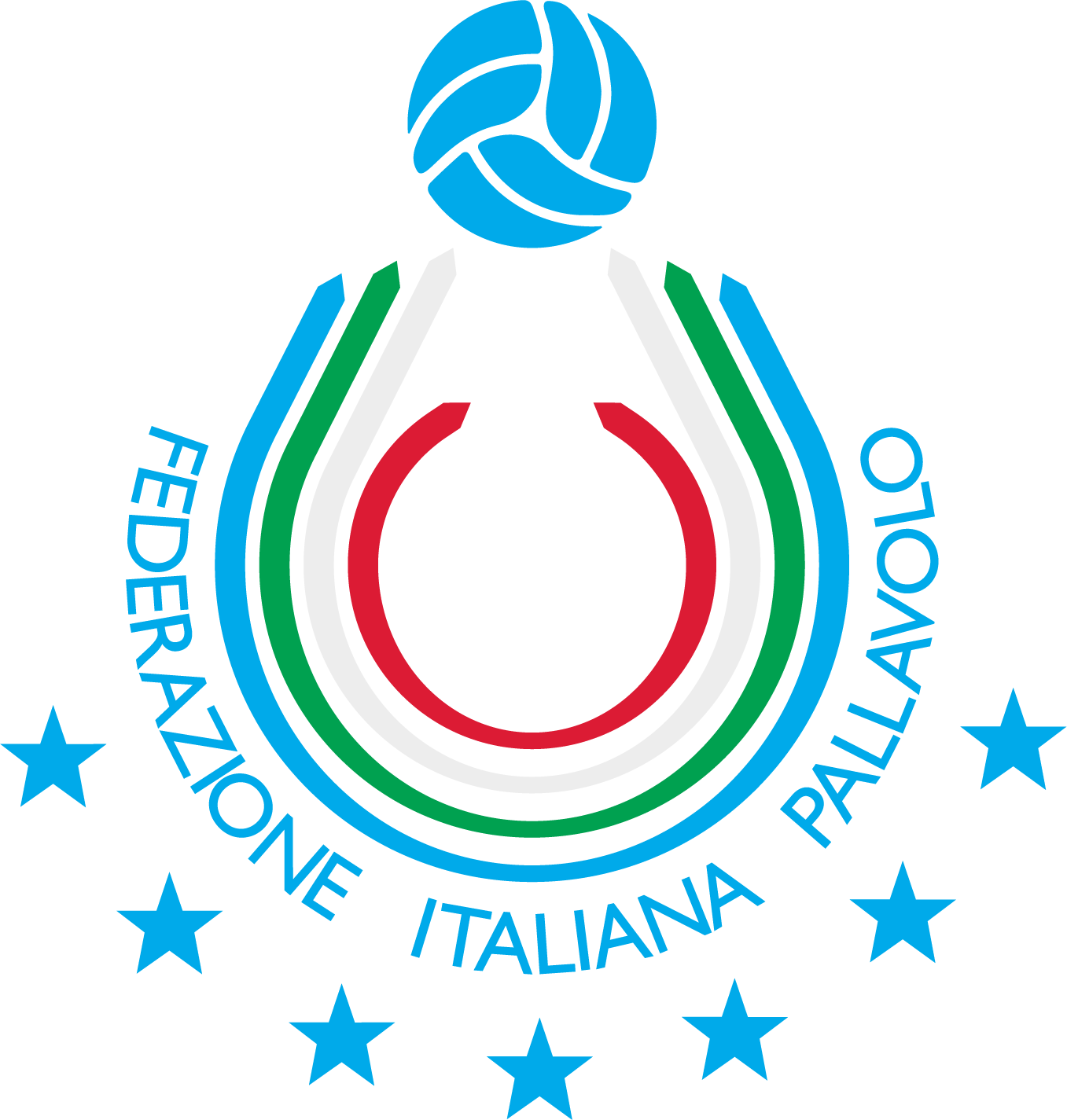
- Sport: Volleyball; Beach volleyball
- Jurisdiction: Italy
- Abbreviation: FIPAV
- Founded: 1946
- Affiliation: FIVB
- Affiliation date: 1947
- Headquarters: Rome
- Location: Italy
- President: Giuseppe Manfredi

Official website
- www.federvolley.it
- (Italy)

The Italian Volleyball Federation (Italian: Federazione Italiana Pallavolo, FIPAV) is the governing body for volleyball in Italy since 1946.

The FIPAV has reported a significant increase in its membership numbers, with over 300,000 registered members as of 2022. This is a notable increase from the pre-COVID numbers in 2019, indicating a growing interest in volleyball in Italy. FIPAV attributes this "boom" to several factors, including the success of the Italian national teams, increased investment in the sport, and a renewed focus on grassroots development. The organization has also emphasized the importance of continued investment in the sport to sustain this growth and maintain its popularity among Italians of all ages and backgrounds.

== History ==
The Italian Federation has been recognised by FIVB from 1947 and is a member of Confédération Européenne de Volleyball (CEV).

== Presidents ==
President	From	To
Arnaldo Eynard	1946	1961
Giancarlo Giannozzi	1961	1977
Pietro Floriano Florio	1977	1978
Antonio Barone	1978	1988
Manlio Fidenzio	1988	1991
Nicolò Catalano	1991	1993
Paolo Borghi	1993	1995
Carlo Magri	1995	2017
Pietro Bruno Cattaneo	2017	2021
Giuseppe Manfredi	2021	reigning

== See also ==
- Italy men's national volleyball team
- Italy women's national volleyball team
