= Dušan Petković (volleyball) =

Serbian volleyball player (born 1992)

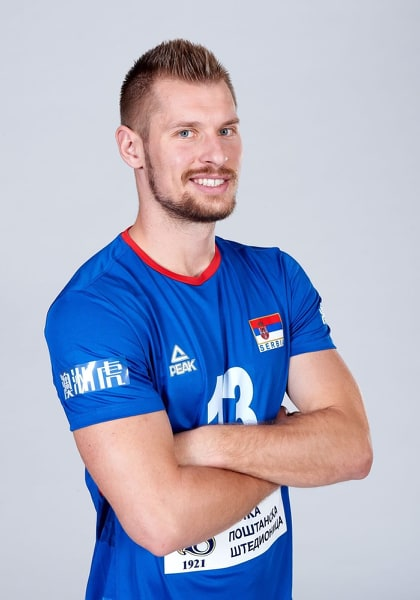

Personal information
- Nationality: Serbian
- Born: 27 January 1992 (age 34); Niš, SR Serbia, SFR Yugoslavia
- Height: 2.02 m (6 ft 8 in)
- Weight: 86 kg (190 lb)
- Spike: 352 cm (139 in)

Volleyball information
- Position: Opposite
- Current club: Kuzbass Kemerovo
- Number: 12

Career
Years	Teams
2009–2010; 2010–2014; 2014–2016; 2016–2017; 2017–2019; 2019–2021; 2021–2022; 2022–2023; 2023–	Radnički Kragujevac; Crvena Zvezda; AS Cannes; Al Rayyan; Argos Volley; Skra Bełchatów; Projekt Warsaw; Kioene Padova; Kuzbass Kemerovo

National team
2013–	Serbia

Dušan Petković (Serbian Cyrillic: Душан Петковић; born 27 January 1992) is a Serbian professional volleyball player who plays as an opposite spiker for Kuzbass Kemerovo and the Serbia national team.

== Honours ==
=== Club ===
- Domestic
  - 2010–11 Serbian Cup, with Crvena Zvezda
  - 2011–12 Serbian SuperCup, with Crvena Zvezda
  - 2011–12 Serbian Championship, with Crvena Zvezda
  - 2012–13 Serbian SuperCup, with Crvena Zvezda
  - 2012–13 Serbian Cup, with Crvena Zvezda
  - 2012–13 Serbian Championship, with Crvena Zvezda
  - 2013–14 Serbian SuperCup, with Crvena Zvezda
  - 2013–14 Serbian Cup, with Crvena Zvezda
  - 2013–14 Serbian Championship, with Crvena Zvezda
  - 2016–17 Emir Cup, with Al Rayyan

=== Youth national team ===
- 2009 CEV U19 European Championship
- 2009 FIVB U19 World Championship
- 2013 FIVB U23 World Championship

=== Individual awards ===
- 2018: Italian Championship – Best scorer (508)
- 2018: Italian Championship – Best spiker
- 2019: Italian Championship – Best scorer (590)
- 2019: Italian Championship – Best spiker
