= Argos Volley =

Italian professional volleyball team

Biosì Indexa Sora
- Short name: Argos Volley
- Founded: 1975
- Ground: PalaPolsinelli (Capacity: 2,000)
- Chairman: Enrico Vicini
- Manager: Mario Barbiero
- League: Italian Volleyball League
- Website: Club home page

Uniforms
Home	Away

Argos Volley is a professional volleyball team based in Sora, Italy. The club plays in SuperLega (previous Serie A1), highest level of the Italian Volleyball League. In season 2016/17 club is named Biosì Indexa Sora.

== History ==
Argos Sora debuted in the highest level of the Italian Volleyball League (SuperLega) in 2016. Before first season in SuperLega, in June was announced the new head coach of club Bruno Bagnoli. Squad on season 2016/17 was completed in July.

== Team ==
Team roster - season 2017/2018
Biosì Indexa Sora
No.	Name	Date of birth	Position
1	(Italy) Federico Marrazzo	September 12, 1994	setter
2	(United States) Mitchell Penning	April 17, 1995	middle blocker
4	(Italy) Edoardo Caneschi	January 26, 1997	middle blocker
5	(United States) Kupono Fey	January 21, 1995	outside hitter
6	(Italy) Marco Lucarelli	December 19, 1996	opposite
8	(Denmark) Rasmus Breuning Nielsen	May 22, 1994	outside hitter
9	(Italy) Mattia Rosso	May 28, 1985	outside hitter
10	(Italy) Andrea Mattei	July 23, 1993	middle blocker
11	(Canada) Alex Duncan-Thibault	May 4, 1994	outside hitter
12	(Bulgaria) Georgi Seganov	June 10, 1993	setter
14	(Italy) Pierpaolo Mauti	March 1, 1995	outside hitter
15	(Serbia) Dušan Petković	January 27, 1992	outside hitter
Head coach: Mario Barbiero; Assistant: Maurizio Colucci

Team roster - season 2016/2017
Biosì Indexa Sora
No.	Name	Date of birth	Position
1	(Italy) Federico Marrazzo	September 12, 1994	setter
2	(Italy) Marco Corsetti	July 26, 1994	libero
3	(Bulgaria) Svetoslav Gotsev	August 31, 1990	middle blocker
5	(Italy) Nicola Tiozzo	May 26, 1993	outside hitter
6	(Italy) Marco Lucarelli	December 19, 1996	opposite
7	(Italy) Marco Santucci	January 30, 1983	libero
8	(Russia) Denis Kalinin	April 28, 1984	outside hitter
9	(Italy) Mattia Rosso	May 28, 1985	outside hitter
10	(Italy) Andrea Mattei	July 23, 1993	middle blocker
12	(Bulgaria) Georgi Seganov	June 10, 1993	setter
14	(Italy) Pierpaolo Mauti	March 1, 1995	outside hitter
15	(Italy) Matteo Sperandio	March 4, 1992	middle blocker
17	(Belarus) Radzivon Miskevich	April 22, 1995	opposite
18	(Italy) Francesco De Marchi^{1}	June 17, 1986	outside hitter
Head coach: Bruno Bagnoli; Assistant: Maurizio Colucci^{1} Francesco De Marchi joined the club on October 19, 2016.
