= Volley Callipo =

Italian volleyball team

- Full name: Tonno Callipo Calabria Vibo Valentia
- Founded: 1993
- Ground: PalaValentia (Capacity: 2,500)
- Chairman: Filippo Callipo
- Manager: Daniele Bagnoli
- League: Italian Volleyball League
- Website: Club home page

Uniforms
Home	Away

Volley Callipo is a professional volleyball team based in Vibo Valentia, Italy. The club plays in SuperLega (previous Serie A1), highest level of the Italian Volleyball League. In season 2017/18 the club is named Tonno Callipo Calabria Vibo Valentia.

== Achievements ==
- Italian Cup Serie A2
  (x4) 2003, 2015, 2016, 2023

== History ==
The club was founded in 1993 in Italian Vibo Valentia by Filippo Callipo. In 2004 was promoted to Serie A1, but in 2007 fell down to Serie A2. After one season came back to Serie A1. In 2014-2016 the club spent in Serie A2, because of Serie A1 reorganization. In these two seasons club won two Italian Cups Serie A2. Since 2016, Tonno Callipo Vibo Valentia has been playing in SuperLega (previous Serie A1). Also in June 2016, was chosen new Argentine head coach Waldo Kantor.

After winning the Serie A2 title in the 2022/23 season, the club's president Filippo Callipo surprisingly announced that the club will suspend all activities for the next club season. This means that the club will not play in SuperLega and lower league. The reason that caused this decision came from economic difficulties that the owner's company faced.

== Team ==
Team roster - season 2022/2023

No.	Name	Date of birth	Position
1	(Serbia) Nikola Mijailović	August 8, 1989	Outside hitter
2	(Italy) Davide Candellaro	June 7, 1989	Middle blocker
3	(Italy) Domenico Cavaccini	March 13, 1987	Libero
5	(Argentina) Santiago Orduna	August 31, 1983	Setter
6	(Italy) Leonardo Carta	May 26, 2003	Libero
7	(Italy) Alessandro Tondo (c)	August 18, 1991	Middle blocker
8	(Italy) Lorenzo Piazza	October 3, 1992	Setter
9	(Italy) Cosimo Balestra	November 30, 2003	Middle blocker
10	(Italy) Matteo Bellia	December 11, 2000	Opposite hitter
11	(Italy) Alessio Tallone	September 23, 1999	Outside hitter
12	(Italy) Jernej Terpin	June 21, 1996	Outside hitter
14	(Italy) Marco Belluomo	September 27, 2003	Middle blocker
15	(Italy) Michele Fedrizzi	May 21, 1991	Outside hitter
17	(Austria) Paul Buchegger	March 4, 1996	Opposite hitter
Head coach: Cezar Douglas; Assistant: Francesco Racaniello

Team roster - season 2021/2022
No.	Name	Date of birth	Position
2	(Japan) Yuji Nishida	January 30, 2000	opposite
3	(Italy) Davide Luigi Russo	February 9, 2001	libero
4	(Italy) Giovanni Maria Gargiulo	January 1, 1999	middle blocker
5	(Brazil) Maurício Borges Silva	February 4, 1989	outside hitter
7	(Italy) Fabio Bisi	July 16, 1994	opposite
8	(Italy) Davide Saitta (c)	June 23, 1987	setter
9	(Italy) Davide Candellaro	June 7, 1989	middle blocker
10	(France) Luka Basic	January 29, 1995	outside hitter
11	(Italy) Marco Rizzo	January 2, 1990	libero
13	(Brazil) Flávio Gualberto	April 22, 1993	middle blocker
15	(Italy) Pier Paolo Partenio	February 6, 1993	setter
16	(Italy) Alberto Pio Nicotra	September 23, 2002	outside spiker
Head coach: Valerio Baldovin; Assistant: Francesco Guarnieri

Team roster - season 2017/2018
Tonno Callipo Vibo Valentia
No.	Name	Date of birth	Position
1	(Brazil) Deivid Junior Costa	April 26, 1988	middle blocker
2	(Italy) Manuel Coscione	January 29, 1980	setter
3	(Italy) Davide Marra	March 12, 1984	libero
4	(Belgium) François Lecat	April 19, 1993	outside hitter
5	(Italy) Marco Izzo	November 17, 1994	setter
6	(Italy) Francesco Corrado	May 10, 1997	outside hitter
7	(Italy) Oleg Antonov	July 28, 1988	outside hitter
8	(Italy) Jacopo Massari	June 2, 1988	outside hitter
10	(Poland) Damian Domagała	April 23, 1998	outside hitter
11	(Italy) Ernesto Torchia	July 3, 1998	libero
12	(Belgium) Pieter Verhees	December 8, 1989	middle blocker
13	(United States) Benjamin Patch	June 21, 1994	outside hitter
18	(Italy) Luca Presta	December 6, 1995	middle blocker
Head coach: Lorenzo Tubertini; Assistant: Antonio Valentini

Team roster - season 2016/2017
Tonno Callipo Vibo Valentia
No.	Name	Date of birth	Position
1	(Brazil) Deivid Junior Costa	April 26, 1988	middle blocker
2	(Italy) Manuel Coscione	January 29, 1980	setter
3	(Italy) Davide Marra	March 12, 1984	libero
4	(France) Baptiste Geiler	March 12, 1987	outside hitter
5	(Italy) Ugo Buzzelli^{1}	May 7, 1994	setter
5	(Italy) Marco Izzo^{2}	November 17, 1994	setter
6	(Italy) Ernesto Torchia	July 30, 1998	libero
7	(Slovakia) Peter Michalovic	May 26, 1990	opposite
8	(Brazil) Carlos Eduardo Silva	August 8, 1994	outside hitter
9	(Italy) Rocco Barone	December 14, 1987	middle blocker
10	(Brazil) Thiago Soares Alves	July 26, 1986	outside hitter
11	(Italy) Graziano Maccarone	August 26, 1996	middle blocker
12	(Italy) Enrico Diamantini	April 4, 1993	middle blocker
13	(Italy) Francesco Corrado	May 10, 1997	opposite
18	(Czech Republic) Filip Rejlek	May 10, 1981	opposite
Head coach: Marcelo Fronckowiak; Assistant: Antonio Valentini^{1} Ugo Buzzelli left the club on November 23, 2016.^{2} Marco Izzo went to club on November 24, 2016.
