= 2015 Memorial of Hubert Jerzy Wagner squads =

This article shows the rosters of all participating teams at the 2015 Memorial of Hubert Jerzy Wagner in Toruń, Poland.

== France ==
The following is the French roster in the 2015 Memorial of Hubert Jerzy Wagner.

Head coach: (France) Laurent Tillie

No.	Name	Date of birth	Height	Weight	Spike	Block	2015 club
1	Jonas Aguenier	28 April 1992	2.00 m (6 ft 7 in)	97 kg (214 lb)	340 cm (130 in)	310 cm (120 in)	(France) AS Cannes
2	Jenia Grebennikov	13 August 1990	1.88 m (6 ft 2 in)	74 kg (163 lb)	345 cm (136 in)	330 cm (130 in)	(Germany) VfB Friedrichshafen
4	Antonin Rouzier	18 August 1986	2.01 m (6 ft 7 in)	100 kg (220 lb)	350 cm (140 in)	330 cm (130 in)	(Turkey) Ziraat Bankası Ankara
5	Trevor Clevenot	28 June 1994	1.98 m (6 ft 6 in)	90 kg (200 lb)	335 cm (132 in)	316 cm (124 in)	(France) Spacer's Toulouse
7	Kévin Tillie	2 November 1990	1.98 m (6 ft 6 in)	83 kg (183 lb)	345 cm (136 in)	325 cm (128 in)	(Turkey) Arkas Izmir
8	Yoann Jaumel	16 September 1987	1.83 m (6 ft 0 in)	79 kg (174 lb)	320 cm (130 in)	303 cm (119 in)	(France) Tours VB
9	Earvin N'Gapeth (C)	12 February 1991	1.94 m (6 ft 4 in)	93 kg (205 lb)	358 cm (141 in)	327 cm (129 in)	(Italy) Pallavolo Modena
10	Kévin Le Roux	11 May 1989	2.09 m (6 ft 10 in)	95 kg (209 lb)	365 cm (144 in)	340 cm (130 in)	(South Korea) Cheonan Hyundai Skywalkers
11	Julien Lyneel	15 April 1990	1.92 m (6 ft 4 in)	85 kg (187 lb)	345 cm (136 in)	325 cm (128 in)	(France) Montpellier UC
14	Nicolas Le Goff	15 February 1992	2.04 m (6 ft 8 in)	97 kg (214 lb)	346 cm (136 in)	317 cm (125 in)	(France) Montpellier UC
16	Nicolas Maréchal	4 March 1987	1.98 m (6 ft 6 in)	83 kg (183 lb)	338 cm (133 in)	327 cm (129 in)	(Poland) PGE Skra Bełchatów
17	Franck Lafitte	8 March 1989	2.03 m (6 ft 8 in)	95 kg (209 lb)	350 cm (140 in)	330 cm (130 in)	(France) Montpellier UC
21	Mory Sidibé	17 June 1987	1.93 m (6 ft 4 in)	92 kg (203 lb)	330 cm (130 in)	330 cm (130 in)	(France) Paris Volley
	Raphael Corre	21 November 1989	1.96 m (6 ft 5 in)	92 kg (203 lb)	0 cm (0 in)	0 cm (0 in)	(France) Nice VB

== Iran ==
The following is the Iranian roster in the 2015 Memorial of Hubert Jerzy Wagner.

Head coach: (Serbia) Slobodan Kovač

No.	Name	Date of birth	Height	Weight	Spike	Block	2015 club
1	Shahram Mahmoudi	20 July 1988	1.98 m (6 ft 6 in)	95 kg (209 lb)	347 cm (137 in)	332 cm (131 in)	(Iran) Shahrdari Urmia
2	Milad Ebadipour	17 October 1993	1.96 m (6 ft 5 in)	78 kg (172 lb)	350 cm (140 in)	310 cm (120 in)	(Iran) Shahrdari Urmia
3	Saman Faezi	23 August 1991	2.04 m (6 ft 8 in)	87 kg (192 lb)	343 cm (135 in)	335 cm (132 in)	(Iran) Paykan Tehran
4	Saeid Marouf (C)	20 October 1985	1.89 m (6 ft 2 in)	81 kg (179 lb)	331 cm (130 in)	311 cm (122 in)	(Russia) Zenit Kazan
5	Farhad Ghaemi	28 August 1989	1.97 m (6 ft 6 in)	73 kg (161 lb)	355 cm (140 in)	335 cm (132 in)	(Iran) Paykan Tehran
6	Mohammad Mousavi	22 August 1987	2.03 m (6 ft 8 in)	86 kg (190 lb)	362 cm (143 in)	344 cm (135 in)	(Iran) Paykan Tehran
9	Adel Gholami	9 February 1986	1.95 m (6 ft 5 in)	88 kg (194 lb)	341 cm (134 in)	330 cm (130 in)	(Iran) Mizan Mashhad
10	Amir Ghafour	6 June 1991	2.02 m (6 ft 8 in)	90 kg (200 lb)	354 cm (139 in)	334 cm (131 in)	(Iran) Matin Varamin
12	Mojtaba Mirzajanpour	7 October 1991	2.05 m (6 ft 9 in)	88 kg (194 lb)	325 cm (128 in)	315 cm (124 in)	(Iran) Paykan Tehran
13	Mehdi Mahdavi	13 February 1984	1.91 m (6 ft 3 in)	96 kg (212 lb)	330 cm (130 in)	310 cm (120 in)	(Iran) Mizan Mashhad
16	Abdolreza Alizadeh	19 February 1987	1.83 m (6 ft 0 in)	80 kg (180 lb)	272 cm (107 in)	252 cm (99 in)	(Iran) Shahrdari Urmia
19	Mehdi Marandi	12 May 1986	1.72 m (5 ft 8 in)	69 kg (152 lb)	295 cm (116 in)	280 cm (110 in)	(Iran) Shahrdari Tabriz
22	Mohammad Senobar	11 July 1989	2.10 m (6 ft 11 in)	94 kg (207 lb)	370 cm (150 in)	361 cm (142 in)	(Iran) Shahrdari Tabriz
24	Mohammad Manavinejad	27 November 1995	2.00 m (6 ft 7 in)	84 kg (185 lb)	340 cm (130 in)	320 cm (130 in)	(Iran) Paykan Tehran

== Japan ==
The following is the Japanese roster in the 2015 Memorial of Hubert Jerzy Wagner.

Head coach: Masashi Nambu

No.	Name	Date of birth	Height	Weight	Spike	Block	2015 club
1	Kunihiro Shimizu	11 August 1986	1.92 m (6 ft 4 in)	97 kg (214 lb)	345 cm (136 in)	335 cm (132 in)	(Japan) Panasonic Panthers
2	Daisuke Sakai	22 October 1981	1.80 m (5 ft 11 in)	75 kg (165 lb)	320 cm (130 in)	305 cm (120 in)	Japan Volleyball Association
3	Kentaro Takahashi	8 February 1995	2.00 m (6 ft 7 in)	93 kg (205 lb)	345 cm (136 in)	330 cm (130 in)	(Japan) University of Tsukuba
4	Yuta Matsuoka	6 November 1989	1.92 m (6 ft 4 in)	72 kg (159 lb)	335 cm (132 in)	325 cm (128 in)	(Japan) Osaka Blazers Sakai
5	Yoshifumi Suzuki	31 March 1983	2.00 m (6 ft 7 in)	95 kg (209 lb)	340 cm (130 in)	320 cm (130 in)	(Japan) Suntory Sunbirds
6	Akihiro Fukatsu	23 July 1987	1.83 m (6 ft 0 in)	68 kg (150 lb)	334 cm (131 in)	315 cm (124 in)	(Japan) JT Thunders
7	Masashi Kuriyama	14 July 1988	1.89 m (6 ft 2 in)	85 kg (187 lb)	340 cm (130 in)	330 cm (130 in)	(Japan) Suntory Sunbirds
8	Yūki Ishikawa	11 December 1995	1.91 m (6 ft 3 in)	75 kg (165 lb)	345 cm (136 in)	330 cm (130 in)	(Japan) Chuo University
9	Yuta Abe	8 August 1981	1.91 m (6 ft 3 in)	85 kg (187 lb)	342 cm (135 in)	320 cm (130 in)	(Japan) Suntory Sunbirds
10	Daisuke Yako	7 October 1988	1.94 m (6 ft 4 in)	89 kg (196 lb)	365 cm (144 in)	325 cm (128 in)	(Japan) JT Thunders
12	Akihiro Yamauchi	30 November 1993	2.04 m (6 ft 8 in)	72 kg (159 lb)	348 cm (137 in)	328 cm (129 in)	(Japan) Aichi Gakuin University
13	Hideomi Fukatsu	1 June 1990	1.80 m (5 ft 11 in)	70 kg (150 lb)	330 cm (130 in)	305 cm (120 in)	(Japan) Panasonic Panthers
15	Masahiro Yanagida	6 July 1992	1.86 m (6 ft 1 in)	78 kg (172 lb)	335 cm (132 in)	315 cm (124 in)	(Japan) Suntory Sunbirds
16	Takashi Dekita	13 August 1991	1.99 m (6 ft 6 in)	90 kg (200 lb)	350 cm (140 in)	330 cm (130 in)	(Japan) Osaka Blazers Sakai
17	Takashi Nagano	11 July 1985	1.76 m (5 ft 9 in)	69 kg (152 lb)	315 cm (124 in)	300 cm (120 in)	(Japan) Panasonic Panthers
18	Yuta Yoneyama	29 August 1984	1.85 m (6 ft 1 in)	85 kg (187 lb)	340 cm (130 in)	315 cm (124 in)	(Japan) Toray Arrows
25	Yasunari Kodama	24 July 1994	1.92 m (6 ft 4 in)	80 kg (180 lb)	336 cm (132 in)	315 cm (124 in)	(Japan) University of Tsukuba

== Poland ==
The following is the Polish roster in the 2015 Memorial of Hubert Jerzy Wagner.

Head coach: (France) Stéphane Antiga

No.	Name	Date of birth	Height	Weight	Spike	Block	2015 club
1	Piotr Nowakowski	18 December 1987	2.05 m (6 ft 9 in)	90 kg (200 lb)	355 cm (140 in)	340 cm (130 in)	(Poland) Asseco Resovia Rzeszów
3	Dawid Konarski	31 August 1989	1.98 m (6 ft 6 in)	101 kg (223 lb)	353 cm (139 in)	335 cm (132 in)	(Poland) Asseco Resovia Rzeszów
6	Bartosz Kurek	29 August 1988	2.07 m (6 ft 9 in)	104 kg (229 lb)	375 cm (148 in)	340 cm (130 in)	(Italy) Cucine Lube Treia
7	Karol Kłos	8 August 1989	2.01 m (6 ft 7 in)	83 kg (183 lb)	357 cm (141 in)	326 cm (128 in)	(Poland) PGE Skra Bełchatów
11	Fabian Drzyzga	3 January 1990	1.96 m (6 ft 5 in)	90 kg (200 lb)	325 cm (128 in)	304 cm (120 in)	(Poland) Asseco Resovia Rzeszów
12	Grzegorz Łomacz	1 October 1987	1.87 m (6 ft 2 in)	81 kg (179 lb)	336 cm (132 in)	309 cm (122 in)	(Poland) MKS Cuprum Lubin
13	Michał Kubiak (C)	23 February 1988	1.91 m (6 ft 3 in)	80 kg (180 lb)	328 cm (129 in)	312 cm (123 in)	(Turkey) Halkbank Ankara
15	Piotr Gacek	16 September 1978	1.85 m (6 ft 1 in)	80 kg (180 lb)	328 cm (129 in)	305 cm (120 in)	(Poland) Lotos Trefl Gdańsk
17	Paweł Zatorski	21 June 1990	1.84 m (6 ft 0 in)	73 kg (161 lb)	328 cm (129 in)	304 cm (120 in)	(Poland) ZAKSA Kędzierzyn-Koźle
18	Marcin Możdżonek	9 February 1985	2.11 m (6 ft 11 in)	93 kg (205 lb)	358 cm (141 in)	338 cm (133 in)	(Turkey) Halkbank Ankara
19	Wojciech Włodarczyk	28 October 1990	2.00 m (6 ft 7 in)	87 kg (192 lb)	350 cm (140 in)	320 cm (130 in)	(Poland) PGE Skra Bełchatów
20	Mateusz Mika	21 January 1991	2.06 m (6 ft 9 in)	86 kg (190 lb)	352 cm (139 in)	320 cm (130 in)	(Poland) Lotos Trefl Gdańsk
21	Rafał Buszek	28 April 1987	1.94 m (6 ft 4 in)	81 kg (179 lb)	345 cm (136 in)	327 cm (129 in)	(Poland) Asseco Resovia Rzeszów
23	Mateusz Bieniek	5 April 1994	2.10 m (6 ft 11 in)	98 kg (216 lb)	351 cm (138 in)	329 cm (130 in)	(Poland) Effector Kielce
25	Artur Szalpuk	20 March 1995	2.02 m (6 ft 8 in)	92 kg (203 lb)	348 cm (137 in)	325 cm (128 in)	(Poland) AZS Politechnika Warszawska
