= 2015 FIVB Volleyball World League =

International volleyball competition

2015 World League
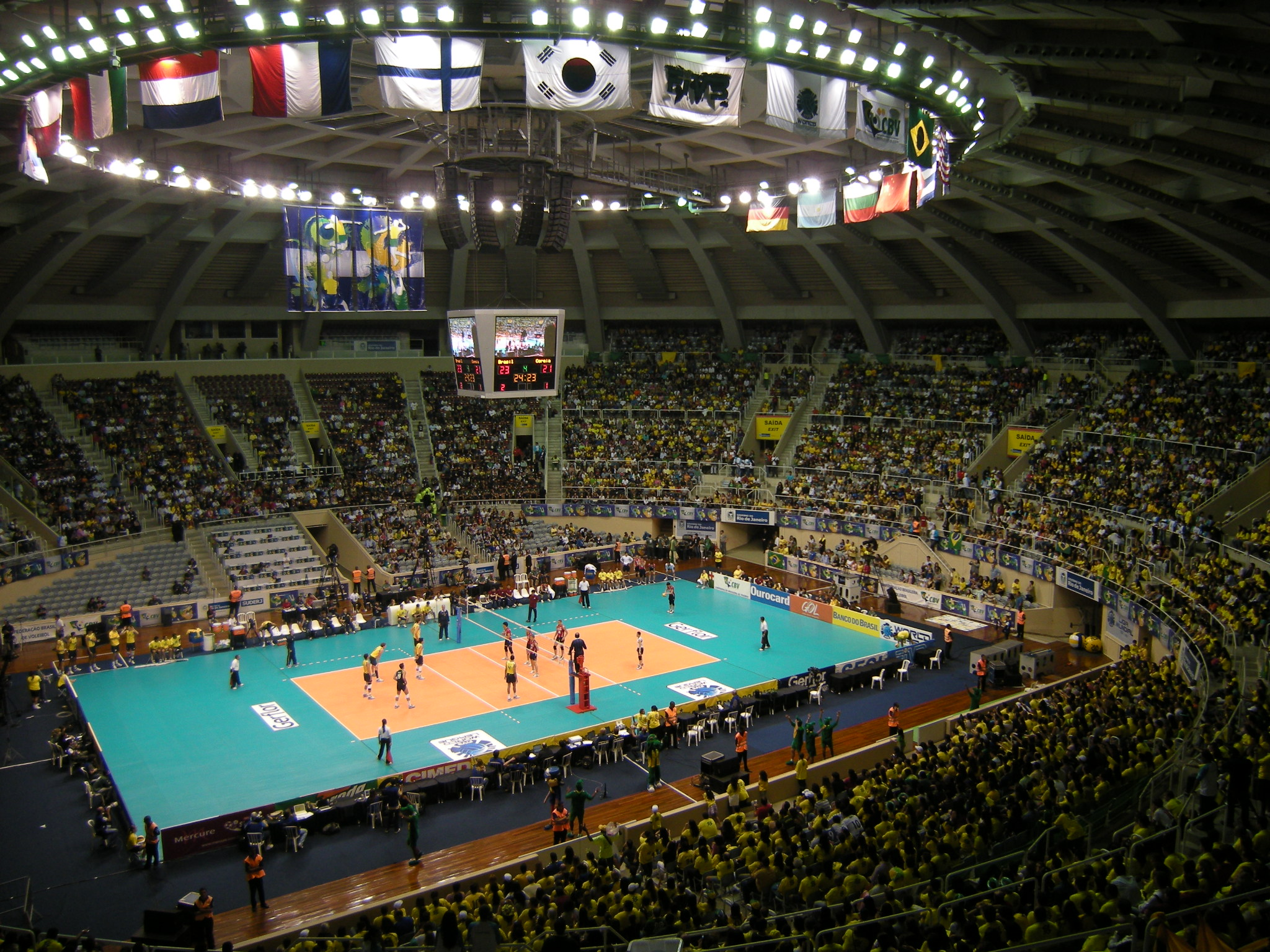
- The Maracanãzinho held the final

Tournament details
- Host country: Brazil
- City: Rio de Janeiro (Group 1 Final)
- Dates: 16 May – 19 July
- Teams: 32 (from 5 confederations)
- Venues: 65 (in 65 host cities)

Final positions
- Champions: France (1st title)
- Runners-up: Serbia
- Third place: United States
- Fourth place: Poland

Tournament awards
- MVP: (France) Earvin N'Gapeth
- Best Setter: (France) Benjamin Toniutti
- Best OH: (France) Earvin N'Gapeth (Poland) Michał Kubiak
- Best MB: (United States) Maxwell Holt (Serbia) Srećko Lisinac
- Best OPP: (Serbia) Aleksandar Atanasijević
- Best Libero: (Poland) Paweł Zatorski

The 2015 FIVB Volleyball World League was the 26th edition of the annual men's international volleyball tournament, played from 16 May to 19 July 2015. The tournament featured a record 32 participating countries from 5 confederations. The teams were divided into 3 groups and 8 pools. The Group 1 Final Round, which served as the volleyball test event of the 2016 Summer Olympics, was held in Rio de Janeiro, Brazil.

== Qualification ==
- All 28 teams of the 2014 edition directly qualified.
- Montenegro and Greece qualified through the 2014 European League.
- Kazakhstan qualified through the 2014 Asian Cup.
- Egypt qualified through the 2013 African Championship.
- Venezuela replaced Germany, who withdrew from the tournament.

Group	Africa	Asia and Oceania	Europe	North America	South America
Group 1		Australia; Iran	Italy; Poland; Russia; Serbia	United States	Brazil
Group 2		Japan; South Korea	Belgium; Bulgaria; Czech Republic; Finland France; Netherlands; Portugal	Canada; Cuba	Argentina
Group 3	Egypt; Tunisia	China; Kazakhstan	Greece; Montenegro; Slovakia; Spain; Turkey	Mexico; Puerto Rico	Venezuela

== Format ==
- It will be the first time the World League will feature 32 teams, having had 28 teams in 2014, 18 teams in 2013 and 16 teams from 2001 to 2003 and 2006–12. The World League featured 8 teams in its inaugural year in 1990, 10 in 1991 and then 12 from 1992 to 2000 and 2004–05.
- During the Intercontinental Round, Pools A to E will play double home and away matches, for a total of 12 matches per team. Pool F to H will feature two stand-alone tournaments.
- The last ranked team of Group 1 after the Intercontinental Round could be relegated if the winners of the Group 2 Final Round can meet the promotion requirements set by the FIVB.

== Pools composition ==
The pools of Group 1 were announced on 18 July 2014, while the pools of Group 2 and 3 were announced on 31 October 2014. After Germany withdrew, Japan replaced them in Pool D, while Venezuela took Japan's spot in Pool H.

Group 1		Group 2			Group 3		
Pool A	Pool B	Pool C	Pool D	Pool E	Pool F	Pool G	Pool H
Italy	Russia	Bulgaria	France	Belgium	Tunisia	China	Egypt
Brazil	United States	Cuba	Japan	Portugal	Puerto Rico	Mexico	Venezuela
Serbia	Poland	Canada	South Korea	Finland	Turkey	Slovakia	Spain
Australia	Iran	Argentina	Czech Republic	Netherlands	Montenegro	Greece	Kazakhstan

== Competition schedule ==
●	Intercontinental round	●	Final round

	Week 1	Week 2	Week 3	Week 4	Week 5	Week 6	Week 7	Week 8	Week 9	Week 10
Group 1			8 matches	8 matches	8 matches	8 matches	8 matches	8 matches		10 matches
Group 2	4 matches	2 matches	10 matches	12 matches	12 matches	10 matches	12 matches	10 matches	4 matches	
Group 3					18 matches	18 matches		4 matches		

== Squads ==
There are 25 players in team rosters. Maximum of 12 regular players and maximum of 2 liberos can be selected to play in each week. The full rosters of 25 players of each team can be seen in the article below.

== Pool standing procedure ==
1. Number of matches won
2. Match points
3. Sets ratio
4. Points ratio
5. If the tie continues as per the point ratio between two teams, the priority will be given to the team which won the last match between them. When the tie in points ratio is between three or more teams, a new classification of these teams in the terms of points 1, 2 and 3 will be made taking into consideration only the matches in which they were opposed to each other.

Match won 3–0 or 3–1: 3 match points for the winner, 0 match points for the loser
Match won 3–2: 2 match points for the winner, 1 match point for the loser

== Intercontinental round ==
- All times are local.

=== Group 1 ===
- The Group 1 Final Round hosts Brazil, the top two teams from Pool A and B and the winners of the Group 2 Final Round will qualify for the Group 1 Final Round. If Brazil finishes as one of the top two teams in Pool A, Pool A will send its top three teams.

==== Pool A ====
Pos	Team	Pld	W	L	Pts	SW	SL	SR	SPW	SPL	SPR	Qualification
1	Brazil	12	9	3	28	33	16	2.063	1145	1038	1.103	Qualified as hosts for the Group 1 Final round
2	Serbia	12	7	5	23	30	22	1.364	1180	1152	1.024	Group 1 Final round
3	Italy	12	6	6	16	22	26	0.846	1073	1096	0.979	Group 1 Final round
4	Australia	12	2	10	5	11	32	0.344	931	1043	0.893	

===== Week 3 =====
- Venue: Adelaide Arena, Adelaide, Australia
- Venue: Mineirinho Arena, Belo Horizonte, Brazil

Date	Time		Score		Set 1	Set 2	Set 3	Set 4	Set 5	Total	Report
29 May	14:00	Brazil	3–2	Serbia	24–26	25–17	25–22	26–28	15–11	115–104	P2 P3
29 May	19:40	Australia	1–3	Italy	19–25	25–22	21–25	20–25		85–97	P2 P3
30 May	16:10	Australia	1–3	Italy	20–25	21–25	25–23	23–25		89–98	P2 P3
31 May	10:00	Brazil	3–1	Serbia	25–18	25–20	19–25	25–22		94–85	P2 P3

===== Week 4 =====
- Venue: Ginásio Adib Moyses Dib, São Bernardo do Campo, Brazil
- Venue: Adriatic Arena, Pesaro, Italy
- Venue: Land Rover Arena, Bologna, Italy

Date	Time		Score		Set 1	Set 2	Set 3	Set 4	Set 5	Total	Report
5 Jun	14:00	Brazil	3–1	Australia	25–20	21–25	25–19	25–18		96–82	P2 P3
5 Jun	20:40	Italy	1–3	Serbia	25–22	23–25	24–26	23–25		95–98	P2 P3
7 Jun	10:05	Brazil	3–0	Australia	31–29	25–19	25–19			81–67	P2 P3
7 Jun	18:10	Italy	3–2	Serbia	25–14	19–25	18–25	25–20	15–12	102–96	P2 P3

===== Week 5 =====
- Venue: SPC Vojvodina, Novi Sad, Serbia
- Venue: Pala Arrex, Jesolo, Italy
- Venue: Pionir Hall, Belgrade, Serbia
- Venue: PalaOlimpia, Verona, Italy

Date	Time		Score		Set 1	Set 2	Set 3	Set 4	Set 5	Total	Report
12 Jun	20:10	Serbia	3–2	Brazil	22–25	23–25	25–23	25–21	15–13	110–107	P2 P3
12 Jun	20:40	Italy	0–3	Australia	16–25	18–25	21–25			55–75	P2 P3
14 Jun	20:10	Serbia	2–3	Brazil	23–25	25–20	21–25	25–22	13–15	107–107	P2 P3
14 Jun	20:10	Italy	3–0	Australia	26–24	25–21	25–23			76–68	P2 P3

===== Week 6 =====
- Venue: SPC Vojvodina, Novi Sad, Serbia
- Venue: Foro Italico Tennis Center Court, Rome, Italy
- Venue: Pionir Hall, Belgrade, Serbia
- Venue: Nelson Mandela Forum, Florence, Italy

Date	Time		Score		Set 1	Set 2	Set 3	Set 4	Set 5	Total	Report
18 Jun	20:10	Serbia	3–0	Australia	31–29	27–25	25–19			83–73	P2 P3
19 Jun	20:10	Italy	3–2	Brazil	26–24	21–25	25–18	17–25	16–14	105–106	P2 P3
20 Jun	20:10	Serbia	3–0	Australia	25–23	25–20	25–20			75–63	P2 P3
21 Jun	20:10	Italy	0–3	Brazil	23–25	22–25	16–25			61–75	P2 P3

===== Week 7 =====
- Venue: SPC Vojvodina, Novi Sad, Serbia
- Venue: Sydney Olympic Park Sports Centre, Sydney, Australia
- Venue: Pionir Hall, Belgrade, Serbia

Date	Time		Score		Set 1	Set 2	Set 3	Set 4	Set 5	Total	Report
26 Jun	20:10	Serbia	3–1	Italy	25–23	25–20	25–27	25–21		100–91	P2 P3
27 Jun	19:10	Australia	1–3	Brazil	17–25	18–25	25–23	20–25		80–98	P2 P3
28 Jun	16:40	Australia	0–3	Brazil	22–25	20–25	15–25			57–75	P2 P3
28 Jun	20:10	Serbia	3–2	Italy	26–24	21–25	26–24	23–25	17–15	113–113	P2 P3

===== Week 8 =====
- Venue: Ginásio Aecim Tocantins, Cuiabá, Brazil
- Venue: State Basketball Centre, Wantirna South, Australia

Date	Time		Score		Set 1	Set 2	Set 3	Set 4	Set 5	Total	Report
2 Jul	13:00	Brazil	3–0	Italy	25–20	26–24	25–19			76–63	P2 P3
3 Jul	13:00	Brazil	2–3	Italy	25–21	27–29	25–21	19–25	19–21	115–117	P2 P3
4 Jul	19:10	Australia	1–3	Serbia	22–25	21–25	31–29	18–25		92–104	P2 P3
5 Jul	16:40	Australia	3–2	Serbia	25–22	22–25	13–25	25–21	15–12	100–105	P2 P3

==== Pool B ====
Pos	Team	Pld	W	L	Pts	SW	SL	SR	SPW	SPL	SPR	Qualification or relegation
1	United States	12	9	3	27	29	17	1.706	1071	992	1.080	Group 1 Final round
2	Poland	12	8	4	22	30	23	1.304	1179	1138	1.036	Group 1 Final round
3	Iran	12	6	6	18	25	21	1.190	1031	1021	1.010	
4	Russia	12	1	11	5	11	34	0.324	946	1076	0.879	Relegated position

===== Week 3 =====
- Venue: Ergo Arena, Gdańsk, Poland
- Venue: Galen Center, Los Angeles, United States

Date	Time		Score		Set 1	Set 2	Set 3	Set 4	Set 5	Total	Report
28 May	20:25	Poland	3–0	Russia	25–16	25–17	25–20			75–53	P2 P3
29 May	20:25	Poland	3–2	Russia	25–19	24–26	20–25	25–19	18–16	112–105	P2 P3
30 May	19:10	United States	3–1	Iran	25–19	25–22	23–25	25–23		98–89	P2 P3
31 May	16:10	United States	3–1	Iran	25–16	25–16	20–25	25–20		95–77	P2 P3

===== Week 4 =====
- Venue: Hala Sportowa Częstochowa, Częstochowa, Poland
- Venue: Walter Pyramid, Long Beach, United States

Date	Time		Score		Set 1	Set 2	Set 3	Set 4	Set 5	Total	Report
5 Jun	19:10	United States	3–1	Russia	25–18	24–26	25–15	28–26		102–85	P2 P3
5 Jun	20:25	Poland	3–1	Iran	25–20	25–22	21–25	27–25		98–92	P2 P3
6 Jun	19:10	United States	3–0	Russia	25–23	25–21	25–16			75–60	P2 P3
6 Jun	20:25	Poland	3–2	Iran	22–25	25–22	25–16	22–25	15–6	109–94	P2 P3

===== Week 5 =====
- Venue: Sears Centre, Hoffman Estates, United States
- Venue: Kazan Volleyball Centre, Kazan, Russia

Date	Time		Score		Set 1	Set 2	Set 3	Set 4	Set 5	Total	Report
12 Jun	19:10	United States	3–2	Poland	23–25	25–23	19–25	25–22	15–9	107–104	P2 P3
13 Jun	18:10	Russia	1–3	Iran	25–20	16–25	19–25	23–25		83–95	P2 P3
13 Jun	19:10	United States	3–1	Poland	23–25	25–23	25–15	25–17		98–80	P2 P3
14 Jun	18:10	Russia	0–3	Iran	20–25	18–25	21–25			59–75	P2 P3

===== Week 6 =====
- Venue: Kazan Volleyball Centre, Kazan, Russia
- Venue: Azadi Indoor Stadium, Tehran, Iran

Date	Time		Score		Set 1	Set 2	Set 3	Set 4	Set 5	Total	Report
19 Jun	18:10	Russia	1–3	Poland	32–30	14–25	22–25	18–25		86–105	P2 P3
19 Jun	21:10	Iran	3–0	United States	25–19	29–27	25–20			79–66	P2 P3
20 Jun	18:10	Russia	2–3	Poland	25–19	21–25	24–26	25–20	14–16	109–106	P2 P3
21 Jun	21:10	Iran	3–0	United States	25–20	25–21	25–19			75–60	P2 P3

===== Week 7 =====
- Venue: Yantarny Sports Complex, Kaliningrad, Russia
- Venue: Azadi Indoor Stadium, Tehran, Iran

Date	Time		Score		Set 1	Set 2	Set 3	Set 4	Set 5	Total	Report
26 Jun	18:10	Russia	0–3	United States	21–25	20–25	19–25			60–75	P2 P3
26 Jun	21:10	Iran	3–2	Poland	25–21	23–25	21–25	25–16	15–11	109–98	P2 P3
27 Jun	18:10	Russia	1–3	United States	23–25	25–19	23–25	18–25		89–94	P2 P3
28 Jun	21:10	Iran	1–3	Poland	25–23	20–25	20–25	19–25		84–98	P2 P3

===== Week 8 =====
- Venue: Azadi Indoor Stadium, Tehran, Iran
- Venue: Tauron Arena, Kraków, Poland

Date	Time		Score		Set 1	Set 2	Set 3	Set 4	Set 5	Total	Report
3 Jul	21:10	Iran	3–0	Russia	25–21	25–21	25–21			75–63	P2 P3
3 Jul	20:25	Poland	3–2	United States	19–25	25–22	21–25	25–20	15–12	105–104	P2 P3
4 Jul	21:10	Iran	1–3	Russia	23–25	25–19	18–25	21–25		87–94	P2 P3
4 Jul	20:25	Poland	1–3	United States	20–25	21–25	25–22	23–25		89–97	P2 P3

=== Group 2 ===
- The Group 2 Final Round hosts Bulgaria and the winners of Pool C, D and E will qualify for the Group 2 Final Round. If Bulgaria finishes first in Pool C, Pool C will send its top two teams.

==== Pool C ====
Pos	Team	Pld	W	L	Pts	SW	SL	SR	SPW	SPL	SPR	Qualification
1	Bulgaria	12	8	4	21	27	21	1.286	1067	1074	0.993	Qualified as hosts for the Group 2 Final round
2	Argentina	12	7	5	21	26	21	1.238	1068	980	1.090	Group 2 Final round
3	Canada	12	6	6	23	29	21	1.381	1097	1074	1.021	
4	Cuba	12	3	9	7	13	32	0.406	944	1048	0.901	

===== Week 1 =====
- Venue: Stampede Corral, Calgary, Canada

Date	Time		Score		Set 1	Set 2	Set 3	Set 4	Set 5	Total	Report
16 May	19:10	Canada	3–0	Cuba	25–20	25–19	26–24			76–63	P2 P3
17 May	19:10	Canada	3–0	Cuba	26–24	25–19	25–21			76–64	P2 P3

===== Week 3 =====
- Venue: Polideportivo Municipal Gustavo Torito Rodríguez, San Martín, Argentina
- Venue: Arena Botevgrad, Botevgrad, Bulgaria

Date	Time		Score		Set 1	Set 2	Set 3	Set 4	Set 5	Total	Report
29 May	22:10	Argentina	3–0	Cuba	25–18	25–19	25–18			75–55	P2 P3
30 May	17:40	Bulgaria	1–3	Canada	20–25	19–25	25–22	21–25		85–97	P2 P3
30 May	21:10	Argentina	2–3	Cuba	25–17	17–25	21–25	25–16	9–15	97–98	P2 P3
31 May	20:40	Bulgaria	3–2	Canada	21–25	23–25	25–23	25–14	15–9	109–96	P2 P3

===== Week 4 =====
- Venue: Scotiabank Centre, Halifax, Canada
- Venue: Coliseo de la Ciudad Deportiva, Havana, Cuba

Date	Time		Score		Set 1	Set 2	Set 3	Set 4	Set 5	Total	Report
5 Jun	20:10	Canada	3–0	Argentina	25–22	27–25	25–19			77–66	P2 P3
5 Jun	20:40	Cuba	1–3	Bulgaria	19–25	21–25	26–24	23–25		89–99	P2 P3
6 Jun	18:40	Canada	2–3	Argentina	25–23	22–25	25–21	19–25	10–15	101–109	P2 P3
6 Jun	20:40	Cuba	1–3	Bulgaria	25–18	20–25	24–26	23–25		92–94	P2 P3

===== Week 5 =====
- Venue: Consolidated Credit Union Place, Summerside, Canada
- Venue: Coliseo de la Ciudad Deportiva, Havana, Cuba

Date	Time		Score		Set 1	Set 2	Set 3	Set 4	Set 5	Total	Report
12 Jun	20:10	Canada	2–3	Bulgaria	25–20	19–25	25–22	25–27	12–15	106–109	P2 P3
12 Jun	20:40	Cuba	3–1	Argentina	25–20	25–21	20–25	25–21		95–87	P2 P3
13 Jun	20:10	Canada	3–1	Bulgaria	25–18	25–19	21–25	25–20		96–82	P2 P3
13 Jun	20:40	Cuba	0–3	Argentina	23–25	18–25	21–25			62–75	P2 P3

===== Week 6 =====
- Venue: Coliseo de la Ciudad Deportiva, Havana, Cuba
- Venue: Polideportivo Delmi, Salta, Argentina

Date	Time		Score		Set 1	Set 2	Set 3	Set 4	Set 5	Total	Report
19 Jun	20:40	Cuba	1–3	Canada	14–25	25–20	21–25	21–25		81–95	P2 P3
20 Jun	18:40	Argentina	2–3	Bulgaria	24–26	25–22	24–26	25–16	16–18	114–108	P2 P3
20 Jun	20:40	Cuba	3–2	Canada	17–25	20–25	25–23	25–19	15–12	102–104	P2 P3
21 Jun	18:40	Argentina	3–0	Bulgaria	25–19	25–19	25–16			75–54	P2 P3

===== Week 7 =====
- Venue: Microestadio Presidente Juan Domingo Perón, González Catán, Argentina
- Venue: Palace of Culture and Sports, Varna, Bulgaria

Date	Time		Score		Set 1	Set 2	Set 3	Set 4	Set 5	Total	Report
26 Jun	18:41	Argentina	3–1	Canada	25–17	18–25	25–14	25–21		93–77	P2 P3
27 Jun	18:40	Argentina	3–2	Canada	23–25	25–15	21–25	27–25	15–6	111–96	P2 P3
27 Jun	20:55	Bulgaria	3–0	Cuba	25–23	25–16	26–24			76–63	P2 P3
28 Jun	20:55	Bulgaria	3–1	Cuba	25–19	25–19	19–25	25–17		94–80	P2 P3

===== Week 8 =====
- Venue: Palace of Culture and Sports, Varna, Bulgaria

Date	Time		Score		Set 1	Set 2	Set 3	Set 4	Set 5	Total	Report
4 Jul	20:55	Bulgaria	3–0	Argentina	27–25	25–20	25–22			77–67	P2 P3
5 Jul	20:55	Bulgaria	1–3	Argentina	19–25	26–24	17–25	18–25		80–99	P2 P3

==== Pool D ====
Pos	Team	Pld	W	L	Pts	SW	SL	SR	SPW	SPL	SPR	Qualification
1	France	12	12	0	35	36	5	7.200	1017	821	1.239	Group 2 Final round
2	Japan	12	5	7	17	19	23	0.826	914	946	0.966	
3	Czech Republic	12	5	7	12	18	28	0.643	984	1068	0.921	
4	South Korea	12	2	10	8	14	31	0.452	962	1042	0.923	

===== Week 3 =====
- Venue: Suwon Gymnasium, Suwon, South Korea
- Venue: Momotaro Arena, Okayama, Japan

Date	Time		Score		Set 1	Set 2	Set 3	Set 4	Set 5	Total	Report
30 May	14:10	South Korea	1–3	France	30–28	23–25	18–25	16–25		87–103	P2 P3
30 May	14:10	Japan	3–1	Czech Republic	21–25	25–18	25–22	25–20		96–85	P2 P3
31 May	14:10	South Korea	0–3	France	17–25	21–25	21–25			59–75	P2 P3
31 May	14:10	Japan	2–3	Czech Republic	25–22	25–20	24–26	23–25	11–15	108–108	P2 P3

===== Week 4 =====
- Venue: Yu Gwan-sun Gymnasium, Cheonan, South Korea
- Venue: Shimadzu Arena, Kyoto, Japan

Date	Time		Score		Set 1	Set 2	Set 3	Set 4	Set 5	Total	Report
6 Jun	14:10	South Korea	2–3	Czech Republic	25–20	19–25	25–18	20–25	12–15	101–103	P2 P3
6 Jun	14:10	Japan	0–3	France	12–25	14–25	26–28			52–78	P2 P3
7 Jun	14:10	South Korea	3–1	Czech Republic	27–29	25–18	25–20	25–21		102–88	P2 P3
7 Jun	14:10	Japan	0–3	France	15–25	18–25	23–25			56–75	P2 P3

===== Week 5 =====
- Venue: Salle Frédéric Lawson-Body, Poitiers, France
- Venue: Suwon Gymnasium, Suwon, South Korea
- Venue: Salle Pierre Dumortier, Tourcoing, France

Date	Time		Score		Set 1	Set 2	Set 3	Set 4	Set 5	Total	Report
12 Jun	20:00	France	3–0	Czech Republic	25–15	25–23	25–11			75–49	P2 P3
13 Jun	14:10	South Korea	1–3	Japan	20–25	25–20	21–25	19–25		85–95	P2 P3
14 Jun	14:10	South Korea	3–0	Japan	25–20	25–21	25–18			75–59	P2 P3
14 Jun	17:00	France	3–0	Czech Republic	27–25	26–24	25–22			78–71	P2 P3

===== Week 6 =====
- Venue: Budvar Arena, České Budějovice, Czech Republic
- Venue: Osaka Municipal Central Gymnasium, Osaka, Japan

Date	Time		Score		Set 1	Set 2	Set 3	Set 4	Set 5	Total	Report
19 Jun	18:10	Czech Republic	0–3	France	18–25	20–25	24–26			62–76	P2 P3
20 Jun	14:20	Japan	3–0	South Korea	25–17	25–17	25–17			75–51	P2 P3
20 Jun	18:10	Czech Republic	1–3	France	17–25	25–23	22–25	14–25		78–98	P2 P3
21 Jun	13:10	Japan	3–0	South Korea	25–21	25–20	25–18			75–59	P2 P3

===== Week 7 =====
- Venue: Salle Robert Grenon, Tours, France
- Venue: Home Credit Arena, Liberec, Czech Republic
- Venue: Kindarena, Rouen, France

Date	Time		Score		Set 1	Set 2	Set 3	Set 4	Set 5	Total	Report
25 Jun	20:00	France	3–0	Japan	25–20	25–19	25–21			75–60	P2 P3
26 Jun	18:10	Czech Republic	3–2	South Korea	25–22	16–25	16–25	25–23	15–12	97–107	P2 P3
27 Jun	18:10	Czech Republic	3–1	South Korea	30–28	25–18	18–25	25–21		98–92	P2 P3
27 Jun	20:00	France	3–2	Japan	23–25	22–25	25–20	25–23	15–10	110–103	P2 P3

===== Week 8 =====
- Venue: Palais des Sports Jacques Chaban Delmas, Castelnau-le-Lez, France
- Venue: Opava Sports Hall, Opava, Czech Republic
- Venue: Brest Arena, Brest, France

Date	Time		Score		Set 1	Set 2	Set 3	Set 4	Set 5	Total	Report
2 Jul	20:00	France	3–0	South Korea	26–24	25–18	25–21			76–63	P2 P3
3 Jul	18:10	Czech Republic	0–3	Japan	21–25	21–25	23–25			65–75	P2 P3
4 Jul	18:10	Czech Republic	3–0	Japan	25–19	30–28	25–13			80–60	P2 P3
4 Jul	20:00	France	3–1	South Korea	23–25	25–23	25–18	25–15		98–81	P2 P3

==== Pool E ====
Pos	Team	Pld	W	L	Pts	SW	SL	SR	SPW	SPL	SPR	Qualification or relegation
1	Belgium	12	10	2	27	32	17	1.882	1150	1024	1.123	Group 2 Final round
2	Netherlands	12	9	3	26	31	17	1.824	1071	995	1.076	
3	Finland	12	4	8	14	21	28	0.750	1044	1119	0.933	
4	Portugal	12	1	11	5	13	35	0.371	1007	1134	0.888	Relegated position

===== Week 1 =====
- Venue: Centro de Desportos e Congressos de Matosinhos, Matosinhos, Portugal

Date	Time		Score		Set 1	Set 2	Set 3	Set 4	Set 5	Total	Report
16 May	15:00	Portugal	1–3	Netherlands	25–23	20–25	21–25	20–25		86–98	P2 P3
17 May	15:00	Portugal	2–3	Netherlands	25–17	18–25	26–24	21–25	12–15	102–106	P2 P3

===== Week 2 =====
- Venue: Tampere Ice Stadium, Tampere, Finland

Date	Time		Score		Set 1	Set 2	Set 3	Set 4	Set 5	Total	Report
23 May	17:10	Finland	2–3	Belgium	20–25	28–30	25–20	25–23	7–15	105–113	P2 P3
24 May	17:10	Finland	2–3	Belgium	31–29	20–25	25–23	21–25	11–15	108–117	P2 P3

===== Week 3 =====
- Venue: Sportcampus Lange Munte, Kortrijk, Belgium

Date	Time		Score		Set 1	Set 2	Set 3	Set 4	Set 5	Total	Report
30 May	20:10	Belgium	3–1	Finland	25–18	20–25	26–24	25–14		96–81	P2 P3
31 May	16:10	Belgium	3–1	Finland	29–27	23–25	25–16	25–10		102–78	P2 P3

===== Week 4 =====
- Venue: Vaasa Arena, Vaasa, Finland
- Venue: Maaspoort Sports and Events, 's-Hertogenbosch, Netherlands

Date	Time		Score		Set 1	Set 2	Set 3	Set 4	Set 5	Total	Report
5 Jun	18:40	Finland	3–0	Portugal	25–19	25–23	25–22			75–64	P2 P3
6 Jun	17:10	Netherlands	3–2	Belgium	25–21	25–18	14–25	22–25	15–9	101–98	P2 P3
6 Jun	18:40	Finland	3–1	Portugal	25–23	28–30	25–14	25–23		103–90	P2 P3
7 Jun	15:10	Netherlands	0–3	Belgium	12–25	17–25	14–25			43–75	P2 P3

===== Week 5 =====
- Venue: Topsportcentrum Almere, Almere, Netherlands
- Venue: Country Hall Ethias Liège, Liège, Belgium

Date	Time		Score		Set 1	Set 2	Set 3	Set 4	Set 5	Total	Report
13 Jun	17:10	Netherlands	3–0	Finland	25–20	25–14	25–18			75–52	P2 P3
13 Jun	20:10	Belgium	3–0	Portugal	25–16	25–21	25–23			75–60	P2 P3
14 Jun	15:10	Netherlands	3–1	Finland	22–25	25–20	25–14	25–19		97–78	P2 P3
14 Jun	16:10	Belgium	3–2	Portugal	25–13	25–27	30–28	23–25	15–13	118–106	P2 P3

===== Week 6 =====
- Venue: MartiniPlaza, Groningen, Netherlands

Date	Time		Score		Set 1	Set 2	Set 3	Set 4	Set 5	Total	Report
19 Jun	19:10	Netherlands	3–0	Portugal	25–18	25–21	25–23			75–62	P2 P3
20 Jun	17:10	Netherlands	2–3	Portugal	25–15	21–25	23–25	25–21	11–15	105–101	P2 P3

===== Week 7 =====
- Venue: Barona Areena, Espoo, Finland
- Venue: Pavilhão Desportivo Municipal da Póvoa de Varzim, Póvoa de Varzim, Portugal

Date	Time		Score		Set 1	Set 2	Set 3	Set 4	Set 5	Total	Report
26 Jun	18:40	Finland	0–3	Netherlands	15–25	20–25	26–28			61–78	P2 P3
27 Jun	17:00	Portugal	1–3	Belgium	25–22	17–25	22–25	21–25		85–97	P2 P3
27 Jun	17:10	Finland	2–3	Netherlands	18–25	25–20	25–18	18–25	13–15	99–103	P2 P3
28 Jun	17:00	Portugal	0–3	Belgium	26–28	23–25	18–25			67–78	P2 P3

===== Week 8 =====
- Venue: Lotto Arena, Antwerp, Belgium
- Venue: Pavilhão Desportivo Municipal da Póvoa de Varzim, Póvoa de Varzim, Portugal

Date	Time		Score		Set 1	Set 2	Set 3	Set 4	Set 5	Total	Report
3 Jul	20:10	Belgium	3–2	Netherlands	22–25	25–20	23–25	33–31	16–14	119–115	P2 P3
4 Jul	17:00	Portugal	2–3	Finland	17–25	25–22	17–25	26–24	13–15	98–111	P2 P3
4 Jul	20:10	Belgium	0–3	Netherlands	23–25	22–25	17–25			62–75	P2 P3
5 Jul	17:00	Portugal	1–3	Finland	18–25	20–25	25–18	23–25		86–93	P2 P3

=== Group 3 ===
- The Group 3 Final Round hosts Slovakia and the winners of Pool F, G and H will qualify for the Group 3 Final Round. If Slovakia finishes first in Pool G, Pool G will send its top two teams.

==== Pool F ====
Pos	Team	Pld	W	L	Pts	SW	SL	SR	SPW	SPL	SPR	Qualification
1	Montenegro	6	5	1	16	17	5	3.400	532	477	1.115	Group 3 Final round
2	Turkey	6	5	1	13	16	8	2.000	562	494	1.138	
3	Puerto Rico	6	1	5	4	7	16	0.438	468	542	0.863	
4	Tunisia	6	1	5	3	5	16	0.313	450	499	0.902	

===== Week 5 =====
- Venue: Morača Sports Center, Podgorica, Montenegro

Date	Time		Score		Set 1	Set 2	Set 3	Set 4	Set 5	Total	Report
12 Jun	17:00	Puerto Rico	2–3	Turkey	18–25	26–24	20–25	25–21	10–15	99–110	P2 P3
12 Jun	20:15	Montenegro	3–0	Tunisia	25–18	25–20	25–16			75–54	P2 P3
13 Jun	17:00	Turkey	3–0	Tunisia	26–24	25–18	25–18			76–60	P2 P3
13 Jun	20:00	Montenegro	3–0	Puerto Rico	25–22	25–23	25–21			75–66	P2 P3
14 Jun	17:00	Tunisia	3–1	Puerto Rico	25–17	20–25	25–17	25–19		95–78	P2 P3
14 Jun	20:00	Montenegro	3–1	Turkey	25–22	23–25	26–24	25–23		99–94	P2 P3

===== Week 6 =====
- Venue: TVF Burhan Felek Sport Hall, Istanbul, Turkey

Date	Time		Score		Set 1	Set 2	Set 3	Set 4	Set 5	Total	Report
19 Jun	17:10	Montenegro	3–0	Tunisia	25–23	25–21	27–25			77–69	P2 P3
19 Jun	20:10	Turkey	3–0	Puerto Rico	25–16	25–16	25–13			75–45	P2 P3
20 Jun	17:10	Puerto Rico	1–3	Montenegro	19–25	26–28	25–22	13–25		83–100	P2 P3
20 Jun	20:10	Turkey	3–1	Tunisia	25–20	25–22	21–25	25–18		96–85	P2 P3
21 Jun	17:00	Tunisia	1–3	Puerto Rico	27–29	16–25	25–18	19–25		87–97	P2 P3
21 Jun	20:00	Turkey	3–2	Montenegro	25–21	23–25	25–23	23–25	15–12	111–106	P2 P3

==== Pool G ====
Pos	Team	Pld	W	L	Pts	SW	SL	SR	SPW	SPL	SPR	Qualification
1	China	6	6	0	14	18	9	2.000	608	568	1.070	Group 3 Final round
2	Greece	6	4	2	11	16	12	1.333	616	589	1.046	
3	Slovakia	6	2	4	10	14	13	1.077	575	566	1.016	Qualified as hosts for the Group 3 Final round
4	Mexico	6	0	6	1	4	18	0.222	451	527	0.856	

===== Week 5 =====
- Venue: Auditorio de la Gente, Tepic, Mexico

Date	Time		Score		Set 1	Set 2	Set 3	Set 4	Set 5	Total	Report
12 Jun	18:01	Slovakia	2–3	China	25–23	25–21	17–25	17–25	15–17	99–111	P2 P3
12 Jun	21:02	Mexico	2–3	Greece	25–20	25–21	21–25	19–25	14–16	104–107	P2 P3
13 Jun	17:00	China	3–2	Greece	25–22	20–25	18–25	30–28	15–13	108–113	P2 P3
13 Jun	19:52	Mexico	0–3	Slovakia	21–25	19–25	19–25			59–75	P2 P3
14 Jun	16:00	Slovakia	2–3	Greece	25–20	25–15	20–25	20–25	17–19	107–104	P2 P3
14 Jun	18:50	Mexico	0–3	China	21–25	22–25	21–25			64–75	P2 P3

===== Week 6 =====
- Venue: Alexandreio Melathron Nick Galis Hall, Thessaloniki, Greece

Date	Time		Score		Set 1	Set 2	Set 3	Set 4	Set 5	Total	Report
19 Jun	19:45	Slovakia	2–3	China	25–20	25–23	19–25	20–25	13–15	102–108	P2 P3
19 Jun	22:55	Greece	3–0	Mexico	25–16	25–18	30–28			80–62	P2 P3
20 Jun	18:00	China	3–1	Mexico	25–11	25–23	18–25	25–15		93–74	P2 P3
20 Jun	21:14	Slovakia	2–3	Greece	25–14	25–17	16–25	19–25	10–15	95–96	P2 P3
21 Jun	18:00	Mexico	1–3	Slovakia	25–22	23–25	23–25	17–25		88–97	P2 P3
21 Jun	21:05	China	3–2	Greece	21–25	25–21	34–32	18–25	15–13	113–116	P2 P3

==== Pool H ====
Pos	Team	Pld	W	L	Pts	SW	SL	SR	SPW	SPL	SPR	Qualification
1	Egypt	6	5	1	16	17	5	3.400	518	447	1.159	Group 3 Final round
2	Spain	6	5	1	14	16	7	2.286	531	488	1.088	
3	Kazakhstan	6	1	5	3	7	17	0.412	495	561	0.882	
4	Venezuela	6	1	5	3	6	17	0.353	492	540	0.911	

===== Week 5 =====
- Venue: Sports Palace Taraz-Arena, Taraz, Kazakhstan

Date	Time		Score		Set 1	Set 2	Set 3	Set 4	Set 5	Total	Report
12 Jun	15:11	Spain	3–2	Egypt	22–25	25–21	25–27	25–22	15–9	112–104	P2 P3
12 Jun	18:35	Kazakhstan	3–2	Venezuela	25–22	31–33	25–23	28–30	15–9	124–117	P2 P3
13 Jun	15:10	Spain	3–1	Venezuela	25–16	21–25	25–22	25–23		96–86	P2 P3
13 Jun	18:40	Kazakhstan	0–3	Egypt	18–25	14–25	21–25			53–75	P2 P3
14 Jun	15:10	Venezuela	0–3	Egypt	22–25	22–25	17–25			61–75	P2 P3
14 Jun	18:40	Kazakhstan	1–3	Spain	25–22	19–25	19–25	16–25		79–97	P2 P3

===== Week 6 =====
- Venue: Cairo Stadium Indoor Hall 2, Cairo, Egypt

Date	Time		Score		Set 1	Set 2	Set 3	Set 4	Set 5	Total	Report
19 Jun	20:30	Spain	3–0	Venezuela	25–18	26–24	25–21			76–63	P2 P3
19 Jun	22:30	Egypt	3–1	Kazakhstan	25–19	25–16	20–25	25–23		95–83	P2 P3
20 Jun	20:30	Spain	3–0	Kazakhstan	25–23	25–18	25–21			75–62	P2 P3
20 Jun	22:30	Egypt	3–0	Venezuela	25–20	25–23	25–20			75–63	P2 P3
21 Jun	20:30	Kazakhstan	2–3	Venezuela	16–25	25–17	19–25	25–20	9–15	94–102	P2 P3
21 Jun	23:15	Egypt	3–1	Spain	25–14	25–18	19–25	25–18		94–75	P2 P3

== Final round ==
=== Group 3 ===
- Venue: Aegon Arena, Bratislava, Slovakia
- All times are Central European Summer Time (UTC+02:00).

==== Final four (Week 8) ====
Semifinals
4 July
Montenegro	3
China	1
4 July
Slovakia	1
Egypt	3

Final
5 July
Montenegro	2
Egypt	3
3rd place match
5 July
China	2
Slovakia	3

===== Semifinals =====
Date	Time		Score		Set 1	Set 2	Set 3	Set 4	Set 5	Total	Report
4 Jul	17:30	Montenegro	3–1	China	25–21	25–21	22–25	25–15		97–82	P2 P3
4 Jul	20:30	Slovakia	1–3	Egypt	23–25	25–22	25–27	23–25		96–99	P2 P3

===== 3rd place match =====
Date	Time		Score		Set 1	Set 2	Set 3	Set 4	Set 5	Total	Report
5 Jul	17:30	China	2–3	Slovakia	25–17	28–26	20–25	27–29	13–15	113–112	P2 P3

===== Final =====
Date	Time		Score		Set 1	Set 2	Set 3	Set 4	Set 5	Total	Report
5 Jul	20:30	Montenegro	2–3	Egypt	20–25	25–21	23–25	25–23	9–15	102–109	P2 P3

=== Group 2 ===
- Venue: Palace of Culture and Sports, Varna, Bulgaria
- All times are Eastern European Summer Time (UTC+03:00).

==== Final four (Week 9) ====
Semifinals
10 July
Bulgaria	3
Belgium	1
10 July
France	3
Argentina	0

Final
11 July
Bulgaria	0
France	3
3rd place match
11 July
Belgium	2
Argentina	3

===== Semifinals =====
Date	Time		Score		Set 1	Set 2	Set 3	Set 4	Set 5	Total	Report
10 Jul	17:40	Bulgaria	3–1	Belgium	23–25	25–14	25–18	25–20		98–77	P2 P3
10 Jul	20:40	France	3–0	Argentina	25–13	25–20	25–17			75–50	P2 P3

===== 3rd place match =====
Date	Time		Score		Set 1	Set 2	Set 3	Set 4	Set 5	Total	Report
11 Jul	17:40	Belgium	2–3	Argentina	18–25	25–20	21–25	25–18	11–15	100–103	P2 P3

===== Final =====
Date	Time		Score		Set 1	Set 2	Set 3	Set 4	Set 5	Total	Report
11 Jul	20:40	Bulgaria	0–3	France	16–25	20–25	21–25			57–75	P2 P3

=== Group 1 ===
- Venue: Ginásio do Maracanãzinho, Rio de Janeiro, Brazil
- All times are Brasília Time (UTC−03:00).

==== Pool play (Week 10) ====
===== Pool I =====
Pos	Team	Pld	W	L	Pts	SW	SL	SR	SPW	SPL	SPR	Qualification
1	United States	2	1	1	3	4	4	1.000	197	191	1.031	Semifinals
2	France	2	1	1	3	4	4	1.000	197	197	1.000	Semifinals
3	Brazil	2	1	1	3	4	4	1.000	200	206	0.971	

Date	Time		Score		Set 1	Set 2	Set 3	Set 4	Set 5	Total	Report
15 Jul	14:05	Brazil	1–3	France	29–27	21–25	29–31	19–25		98–108	P2 P3
16 Jul	14:05	Brazil	3–1	United States	28–26	22–25	25–22	27–25		102–98	P2 P3
17 Jul	14:05	United States	3–1	France	25–21	25–22	24–26	25–20		99–89	P2 P3

===== Pool J =====
Pos	Team	Pld	W	L	Pts	SW	SL	SR	SPW	SPL	SPR	Qualification
1	Poland	2	1	1	4	5	4	1.250	204	190	1.074	Semifinals
2	Serbia	2	1	1	3	5	5	1.000	210	206	1.019	Semifinals
3	Italy	2	1	1	2	4	5	0.800	184	202	0.911	

Date	Time		Score		Set 1	Set 2	Set 3	Set 4	Set 5	Total	Report
15 Jul	16:55	Serbia	2–3	Italy	23–25	25–14	23–25	25–20	9–15	105–99	P2 P3
16 Jul	17:00	Poland	3–1	Italy	25–15	27–25	20–25	25–20		97–85	P2 P3
17 Jul	16:45	Serbia	3–2	Poland	18–25	25–22	22–25	25–22	15–13	105–107	P2 P3

==== Final four (Week 10) ====
Semifinals
18 July
United States	2
Serbia	3
18 July
France	3
Poland	2

Final
19 July
Serbia	0
France	3
3rd place match
19 July
United States	3
Poland	0

===== Semifinals =====
Date	Time		Score		Set 1	Set 2	Set 3	Set 4	Set 5	Total	Report
18 Jul	10:00	United States	2–3	Serbia	23–25	21–25	27–25	25–20	12–15	108–110	P2 P3
18 Jul	13:15	France	3–2	Poland	25–23	25–23	19–25	22–25	17–15	108–111	P2 P3

===== 3rd place match =====
Date	Time		Score		Set 1	Set 2	Set 3	Set 4	Set 5	Total	Report
19 Jul	09:10	United States	3–0	Poland	25–22	25–23	25–23			75–68	P2 P3

===== Final =====
Date	Time		Score		Set 1	Set 2	Set 3	Set 4	Set 5	Total	Report
19 Jul	11:30	Serbia	0–3	France	19–25	21–25	23–25			63–75	P2 P3

== Final standing ==
Rank	Team
1st place, gold medalist(s)	France
2nd place, silver medalist(s)	Serbia
3rd place, bronze medalist(s)	United States
4	Poland
5	Brazil
5	Italy
7	Iran
8	Australia
8	Russia
10	Bulgaria
11	Argentina
12	Belgium
13	Japan
13	Netherlands
15	Canada
15	Czech Republic
15	Finland
18	Cuba
18	Portugal
18	South Korea
21	Egypt
22	Montenegro
23	Slovakia
24	China
25	Greece
25	Spain
25	Turkey
28	Kazakhstan
28	Puerto Rico
30	Mexico
30	Tunisia
30	Venezuela

2015 World League champions

France
1st title

14-man Roster for Group 1 Final Round
Aguenier, Grebennikov, Rouzier, Clévenot, Toniutti (c), K. Tillie, Jaumel, N'Gapeth, Le Roux, Lyneel, Le Goff, Maréchal, Lafitte, Sidibé
Head coach
L. Tillie

== Awards ==
- Most valuable player
  (France) Earvin N'Gapeth
- Best setter
  (France) Benjamin Toniutti
- Best outside spikers
  (France) Earvin N'Gapeth
  (Poland) Michał Kubiak
- Best middle blockers
  (United States) Maxwell Holt
  (Serbia) Srećko Lisinac
- Best opposite spiker
  (Serbia) Aleksandar Atanasijević
- Best libero
  (Poland) Paweł Zatorski

== Prize money ==
- Prize Money for the Final Standing
  Champions – $1,000,000
  Runners-up – $500,000
  3rd place – $300,000
  4th place – $150,000
  5th place – $75,000 (2 teams)
- Prize Money for the Awards
  Most Valuable Player – $30,000
  Best Setter – $10,000
  Best Outside Spiker – $10,000 (2 players)
  Best Middle Blocker – $10,000 (2 players)
  Best Opposite Spiker – $10,000
  Best Libero – $10,000

== Statistics ==
The statistics of each group follow the vis reports P2 and P3. The statistics include 6 volleyball skills, serve, receive, set, spike, block, and dig. The table below shows the top 5 ranked players in each skill plus top scorers as of 6 July 2015.

=== Best scorers ===
The best scorers determined by players who scored points from spike, block, and serve.

	Group 1		Group 2		Group 3	
Rank	Name	Points	Name	Points	Name	Points
1	(Poland) Bartosz Kurek	207	(Belgium) Sam Deroo	207	(Montenegro) Vojin Ćaćić	126
2	(Australia) Thomas Edgar	196	(Finland) Urpo Sivula	193	(Egypt) Badawy Mohamed Moneim	109
3	(Brazil) Ricardo Lucarelli	169	(Cuba) Rolando Cepeda	192	(Venezuela) Kervin Piñerua	108
4	(Iran) Shahram Mahmoudi	141	(Japan) Kunihiro Shimizu	180	(Montenegro) Marko Bojić	103
5	(Poland) Mateusz Mika	139	(Belgium) Gert Van Walle	175	(Egypt) Ahmed Abdelhay	100

=== Best spikers ===
The best spikers determined by players who successfully spike in percentage (%success).

	Group 1		Group 2		Group 3	
Rank	Name	%succ	Name	%succ	Name	%succ
1	(Brazil) Ricardo Lucarelli	56.98	(France) Antonin Rouzier	59.26	(Greece) Mitar Tzourits	60.00
2	(Iran) Shahram Mahmoudi	56.33	(France) Earvin N'Gapeth	56.45	(Greece) Rafail Koumentakis	57.84
3	(United States) Matthew Anderson	51.57	(South Korea) Song Myung-geun	53.41	(China) Dai Qingyao	57.02
4	(Brazil) Wallace de Souza	51.47	(Belgium) Sam Deroo	53.31	(Turkey) Kadir Cin	53.68
5	(Iran) Milad Ebadipour	50.91	(Japan) Yūki Ishikawa	52.22	(Venezuela) Kervin Piñerua	53.59

=== Best blockers ===
The best scorers determined by players who had the most numbers of stuff block divided by numbers of sets which his team played (average stuff block/set).

	Group 1		Group 2		Group 3	
Rank	Name	Avg/set	Name	Avg/set	Name	Avg/set
1	(Iran) Mohammad Mousavi	0.65	(France) Kévin Le Roux	0.65	(Spain) Jorge Fernández Valcarcel	0.78
2	(Australia) Nehemiah Mote	0.51	(Bulgaria) Viktor Yosifov	0.57	(Spain) Miguel Angel Fornes	0.74
3	(Italy) Simone Anzani	0.50	(Bulgaria) Teodor Todorov	0.56	(Puerto Rico) Mannix Roman	0.65
4	(Australia) Jacob Ross Guymer	0.49	(France) Nicolas Le Goff	0.54	(Kazakhstan) Anton Kuznetsov	0.63
5	(United States) Maxwell Holt	0.48	(Belgium) Pieter Verhees	0.53	(Tunisia) Omar Agrebi	0.62

=== Best servers ===
The best scorers determined by players who had the most numbers of ace serve divided by numbers of sets which his team played (average ace serve/set).

	Group 1		Group 2		Group 3	
Rank	Name	Avg/set	Name	Avg/set	Name	Avg/set
1	(Australia) Paul Sanderson	0.30	(Netherlands) Nimir Abdel-Aziz	0.57	(Spain) Daniel Rocamora Blazquez	0.52
2	(Australia) Thomas Edgar	0.30	(Finland) Olli-Pekka Ojansivu	0.41	(Montenegro) Marko Bojić	0.52
3	(United States) Micah Christenson	0.26	(Portugal) Alexandre Ferreira	0.38	(China) Zhang Zhejia	0.47
4	(Italy) Emanuele Birarelli	0.25	(France) Earvin N'Gapeth	0.37	(China) Yuan Zhi	0.36
5	(Serbia) Srećko Lisinac	0.25	(Finland) Urpo Sivula	0.33	(Egypt) Hossam Abdalla	0.35

=== Best setters ===
The best scorers determined by players who had the most numbers of running set divided by numbers of sets which his team played (average running set/set).

	Group 1		Group 2		Group 3	
Rank	Name	Avg/set	Name	Avg/set	Name	Avg/set
1	(Italy) Dragan Travica	3.88	(Japan) Hideomi Fukatsu	6.55	(Venezuela) José Carrasco	9.43
2	(Iran) Saeid Marouf	3.87	(France) Benjamin Toniutti	6.07	(Spain) Ángel Trinidad	8.43
3	(Poland) Fabian Drzyzga	3.85	(Cuba) Ricardo Calvo	5.82	(Kazakhstan) Kanat Gabdulin	6.17
4	(United States) Micah Christenson	3.85	(Canada) TJ Sanders	5.76	(Egypt) Abdallah Abdalsalam Abdallah Bekhit	4.80
5	(Serbia) Nikola Jovović	3.67	(Argentina) Demián González	4.68	(Mexico) Pedro Rangel	2.68

=== Best diggers ===
The best scorers determined by players who had the most numbers of excellent dig divided by numbers of sets which his team played (average excellent dig/set).

	Group 1		Group 2		Group 3	
Rank	Name	Avg/set	Name	Avg/set	Name	Avg/set
1	(Poland) Paweł Zatorski	2.62	(Finland) Lauri Kerminen	2.04	(Spain) Francisco J. Ruiz	0.78
2	(Poland) Michał Kubiak	1.77	(Belgium) Stijn Dejonckheere	1.45	(Egypt) Mohamed Moawad	0.74
3	(United States) Erik Shoji	1.76	(Cuba) Yonder Garcia	1.44	(Spain) Sergio Noda Blanco	0.52
4	(Australia) Luke Perry	1.58	(France) Jenia Grebennikov	1.44	(Spain) Francesc Llenas	0.52
5	(Italy) Massimo Colaci	1.56	(Portugal) Ivo Casas	1.22	(Egypt) Badawy Mohamed Moneim	0.48

=== Best receivers ===
The best scorers determined by numbers of excellent receive minus fault receive in percentage (%efficient).

	Group 1		Group 2		Group 3	
Rank	Name	%eff	Name	%eff	Name	%eff
1	(Italy) Ivan Zaytsev	51.75	(France) Earvin N'Gapeth	61.16	(Puerto Rico) Jackson Rivera	62.01
2	(Italy) Filippo Lanza	51.71	(South Korea) Jeong Min-su	56.63	(Greece) Rafail Koumentakis	57.98
3	(United States) Erik Shoji	43.88	(Bulgaria) Nikolay Penchev	53.03	(Puerto Rico) Dennis Del Valle	57.72
4	(Australia) Paul Sanderson	43.27	(Cuba) Yonder Garcia	46.61	(Turkey) Baturalp Burak Gungor	57.02
5	(Poland) Michał Kubiak	34.90	(South Korea) Kwak Seung-suk	46.38	(Turkey) Nuri Şahin	52.73
