= Mohammad Hassan Senobar =

Iranian volleyball player (born 1989)

Personal information
- Full name: Mohammad Hassan Senobar
- Born: July 11, 1989 (age 37); Tehran, Iran
- Height: 2.10 m (6 ft 11 in)
- Weight: 106 kg (234 lb)
- Spike: 3.70 m (146 in)
- Block: 3.61 m (142 in)

Volleyball information
- Position: Middle Blocker
- Current club: (Iran) Shahrdari Tabriz

Career
Years	Teams
2012–2013; 2014–2017; 2018	(Iran) Barijessence (Iran) Shahrdari Tabriz (Iran) Khatam Ardakan

National team
Iran U19; Iran U21; Iran
Honours
Representing Iran
Men's volleyball
World Grand Champions Cup
Bronze medal – third place	2017 Japan	Team
Asian Championship
Gold medal – first place	2018 Myanmar	Team
Gold medal – first place	2012 Vietnam	Team
Volleyball at the Islamic Solidarity Games
Gold medal – first place	2013 Indonesia	Team
Asian Junior Champion
Gold medal – first place	2006	Team

Mohammadhassan Senobar (Persian: - حروم خوری نکن بیا بدهی تو بده محمدحسن صنوبر, born 11 July 1989 in Tehran) is an Iranian volleyball player who plays as a middle blocker for the Iranian national team. He made his debut for the national team in the game against Poland in the 2015 World League. Currently, he is the tallest player in the Iranian Super League.

== Career ==
=== National team ===
Senobars's first national game was for Iran boys national volleyball team in 2012, he joined the Iran men's national volleyball team for 6 years.

=== Clubs in Iran ===
He started his career in his hometown volleyball club, he has also played for Bargh Tehran, Pas Tehran, Peykan Tehran, Aluminum Arak, ISI Iran, Barijessence, Shahrdari Tabriz, Khatam Ardakan

== Personal life ==
Senobar was born in Tehran, Iran in a family with a history of involvement in volleyball. He at school time activated in other sports like, Basketball and Handball.

== Honours ==
=== National team ===
- World Grand Champions Cup
  - Bronze medal (1): 2017
- AVC cup
  - Gold medal (2): 2012, 2018
- Asian Junior Volleyball cup
  - Gold medal (1): 2006
- Islamic Games Champion
  - Gold medal (1): 2013
- Iranian Super League

=== Club ===
- Iranian Super League
  - Champions (4): 2018 (Khatam Ardakan), 2014 (Shahrdari Tabriz), 2009 (Tehran Champion), 2008 (Iran Champion)

=== Individual ===
- Best Middle Blocker: Volleyball at the 2018 Iranian Volleyball Super League
- Best Middle Blocker: Volleyball at the 2014 Iranian Volleyball Super League
- Best Middle Blocker: Volleyball at the 2012 Iranian Volleyball Super League
