= 2015 Men's European Volleyball Championship =

Volleyball tournament in Bulgaria and Italy

2015 Men's European Championship
Tournament details
- Host country: Italy; Bulgaria
- Dates: 9–18 October
- Teams: 16
- Venues: 4 (in 4 host cities)

Final positions
- Champions: France (1st title)

Tournament awards
- MVP: (France) Antonin Rouzier

Tournament statistics
- Matches played: 36
- Attendance: 161,370 (4,483 per match)

The 2015 Men's European Volleyball Championship was the 29th edition of the Men's European Volleyball Championship, organised by Europe's governing volleyball body, the CEV. It was held in Bulgaria and Italy from 9 to 18 October 2015. For the first time the competition had an official song; "Heroes" featuring vocals by Niki Bakalov.

France won their first title in the tournament by defeating Slovenia, which went to the final for the first time, in straight sets. Antonin Rouzier was elected the Most Valuable Player.

== Qualification ==
- Hosts
  - Bulgaria
  - Italy
- Top 5 teams of the 2013 edition directly qualified.
  - Russia
  - Serbia
  - France
  - Germany
  - Belgium
- Qualified through the qualification.
  - Belarus
  - Croatia
  - Czech Republic
  - Estonia
  - Finland
  - Netherlands
  - Poland
  - Slovakia
  - Slovenia

== Pools composition ==
The drawing of lots was held in Sofia, Bulgaria on 16 February 2015. First, the hosts and the team which was chosen by the hosts were seeded at the top of each pool. Then the next 4 teams which ranked highest in the previous edition were drawn. Finally, the other teams were drawn. Numbers in brackets denote the European ranking as of 25 September 2015.

Pool A	Pool B	Pool C	Pool D
Bulgaria (5)	Italy (2)	Poland (4)	Russia (1)
Germany (6)	France (7)	Belgium (10)	Serbia (2)
Czech Republic (13)	Croatia (22)	Belarus (20)	Slovakia (9)
Netherlands (14)	Estonia (17)	Slovenia (11)	Finland (8)

== Venues ==
Pool A and Final round	Pool B	Pool C	Pool D, Playoffs and Quarterfinals
Sofia, Bulgaria	Turin, Italy	Varna, Bulgaria	Busto Arsizio, Italy
Armeets Arena	Torino Palavela	Palace of Culture and Sports	PalaYamamay
Capacity: 12,500	Capacity: 8,300	Capacity: 5,500	Capacity: 5,000

== Pool standing procedure ==
1. Number of matches won
2. Match points
3. Sets ratio
4. Points ratio
5. Result of the last match between the tied teams

Match won 3–0 or 3–1: 3 match points for the winner, 0 match points for the loser
Match won 3–2: 2 match points for the winner, 1 match point for the loser

== Preliminary round ==
- All times in Bulgaria are Eastern European Summer Time (UTC+03:00) and all times in Italy are Central European Summer Time (UTC+02:00).

=== Pool A ===
Pos	Team	Pld	W	L	Pts	SW	SL	SR	SPW	SPL	SPR	Qualification
1	Bulgaria (H)	3	3	0	7	9	4	2.250	292	273	1.070	Quarterfinals
2	Netherlands	3	2	1	6	8	6	1.333	317	305	1.039	Playoffs
3	Germany	3	1	2	4	5	6	0.833	239	223	1.072	Playoffs
4	Czech Republic	3	0	3	1	3	9	0.333	223	270	0.826	

Source: CEV
(H) Host

Date	Time		Score		Set 1	Set 2	Set 3	Set 4	Set 5	Total	Report
9 Oct	17:30	Czech Republic	1–3	Netherlands	21–25	17–25	25–20	18–25		81–95	Report
9 Oct	20:30	Bulgaria	3–0	Germany	25–20	25–17	25–20			75–57	Report
10 Oct	17:30	Netherlands	3–2	Germany	17–25	25–23	22–25	25–21	15–13	104–107	Report
10 Oct	20:30	Czech Republic	2–3	Bulgaria	25–19	20–25	25–16	19–25	9–15	98–100	Report
11 Oct	17:45	Germany	3–0	Czech Republic	25–14	25–14	25–16			75–44	Report
11 Oct	20:45	Netherlands	2–3	Bulgaria	27–29	25–20	26–28	25–23	15–17	118–117	Report

=== Pool B ===
Pos	Team	Pld	W	L	Pts	SW	SL	SR	SPW	SPL	SPR	Qualification
1	France	3	3	0	8	9	3	3.000	282	237	1.190	Quarterfinals
2	Italy (H)	3	2	1	7	8	3	2.667	250	229	1.092	Playoffs
3	Estonia	3	1	2	3	4	6	0.667	211	220	0.959	Playoffs
4	Croatia	3	0	3	0	0	9	0.000	169	226	0.748	

Source: CEV
(H) Host

Date	Time		Score		Set 1	Set 2	Set 3	Set 4	Set 5	Total	Report
9 Oct	18:00	Croatia	0–3	France	24–26	14–25	22–25			60–76	Report
9 Oct	21:00	Italy	3–0	Estonia	25–19	26–24	25–15			76–58	Report
10 Oct	17:30	France	3–1	Estonia	25–13	25–22	22–25	25–18		97–78	Report
10 Oct	20:30	Croatia	0–3	Italy	22–25	21–25	19–25			62–75	Report
11 Oct	15:00	Estonia	3–0	Croatia	25–19	25–18	25–10			75–47	Report
11 Oct	18:00	France	3–2	Italy	23–25	21–25	25–19	25–17	15–13	109–99	Report

=== Pool C ===
Pos	Team	Pld	W	L	Pts	SW	SL	SR	SPW	SPL	SPR	Qualification
1	Poland	3	3	0	9	9	1	9.000	260	200	1.300	Quarterfinals
2	Belgium	3	2	1	6	6	4	1.500	232	232	1.000	Playoffs
3	Slovenia	3	1	2	3	5	6	0.833	266	252	1.056	Playoffs
4	Belarus	3	0	3	0	0	9	0.000	151	225	0.671	

Source: CEV

Date	Time		Score		Set 1	Set 2	Set 3	Set 4	Set 5	Total	Report
9 Oct	17:30	Slovenia	3–0	Belarus	25–12	25–21	25–17			75–50	Report
9 Oct	20:30	Poland	3–0	Belgium	25–18	29–27	25–16			79–61	Report
10 Oct	17:30	Belarus	0–3	Belgium	17–25	18–25	17–25			52–75	Report
10 Oct	20:30	Slovenia	1–3	Poland	21–25	30–28	26–28	13–25		90–106	Report
11 Oct	15:00	Belgium	3–1	Slovenia	27–25	14–25	27–25	28–26		96–101	Report
11 Oct	18:00	Belarus	0–3	Poland	13–25	19–25	17–25			49–75	Report

=== Pool D ===
Pos	Team	Pld	W	L	Pts	SW	SL	SR	SPW	SPL	SPR	Qualification
1	Russia	3	3	0	9	9	1	9.000	246	187	1.316	Quarterfinals
2	Serbia	3	2	1	5	7	5	1.400	277	261	1.061	Playoffs
3	Finland	3	1	2	3	3	6	0.500	193	218	0.885	Playoffs
4	Slovakia	3	0	3	1	2	9	0.222	217	267	0.813	

Source: CEV

Date	Time		Score		Set 1	Set 2	Set 3	Set 4	Set 5	Total	Report
9 Oct	17:30	Slovakia	2–3	Serbia	22–25	25–22	28–30	26–24	9–15	110–116	Report
9 Oct	20:30	Russia	3–0	Finland	25–20	25–19	25–23			75–62	Report
10 Oct	15:00	Serbia	3–0	Finland	25–19	25–15	25–21			75–55	Report
10 Oct	18:00	Slovakia	0–3	Russia	14–25	10–25	15–25			39–75	Report
11 Oct	15:00	Finland	3–0	Slovakia	26–24	25–22	25–22			76–68	Report
11 Oct	18:00	Serbia	1–3	Russia	23–25	25–21	18–25	20–25		86–96	Report

== Final round ==
- All times in Bulgaria are Eastern European Summer Time (UTC+03:00) and all times in Italy are Central European Summer Time (UTC+02:00).

Playoffs; 13 October
Belgium	0
Germany	3
Serbia	3
Estonia	2
Netherlands	0
Slovenia	3
Italy	3
Finland	0

Quarterfinals; 14 October
Bulgaria	3
Germany	0
France	3
Serbia	1
Poland	2
Slovenia	3
Russia	0
Italy	3

Semifinals; 17 October – Sofia
Bulgaria	2
France	3
Slovenia	3
Italy	1

Final; 18 October – Sofia
France	3
Slovenia	0
Third place
Bulgaria	1
Italy	3

=== Playoffs ===
Date	Time		Score		Set 1	Set 2	Set 3	Set 4	Set 5	Total	Report
13 Oct	17:30	Netherlands	0–3	Slovenia	16–25	19–25	22–25			57–75	Report
13 Oct	17:30	Serbia	3–2	Estonia	21–25	14–25	25–8	25–22	15–13	100–93	Report
13 Oct	20:30	Belgium	0–3	Germany	16–25	29–31	17–25			62–81	Report
13 Oct	20:30	Italy	3–0	Finland	25–19	25–16	25–22			75–57	Report

=== Quarterfinals ===
Date	Time		Score		Set 1	Set 2	Set 3	Set 4	Set 5	Total	Report
14 Oct	17:45	Poland	2–3	Slovenia	17–25	19–25	25–23	25–19	14–16	100–108	Report
14 Oct	17:30	France	3–1	Serbia	25–22	25–23	14–25	25–20		89–90	Report
14 Oct	20:45	Bulgaria	3–0	Germany	25–19	25–23	25–23			75–65	Report
14 Oct	20:30	Russia	0–3	Italy	20–25	19–25	19–25			58–75	Report

=== Semifinals ===
Date	Time		Score		Set 1	Set 2	Set 3	Set 4	Set 5	Total	Report
17 Oct	17:45	Slovenia	3–1	Italy	25–13	23–25	25–20	25–20		98–78	Report
17 Oct	20:45	Bulgaria	2–3	France	25–18	25–22	24–26	21–25	12–15	107–106	Report

=== 3rd place match ===
Date	Time		Score		Set 1	Set 2	Set 3	Set 4	Set 5	Total	Report
18 Oct	17:30	Bulgaria	1–3	Italy	20–25	14–25	25–23	20–25		79–98	Report

=== Final ===
Date	Time		Score		Set 1	Set 2	Set 3	Set 4	Set 5	Total	Report
18 Oct	20:45	France	3–0	Slovenia	25–19	29–27	29–27			83–73	Report

== Final standing ==
Rank	Team
1st place, gold medalist(s)	France
2nd place, silver medalist(s)	Slovenia
3rd place, bronze medalist(s)	Italy
4	Bulgaria
5	Poland
6	Russia
7	Serbia
8	Germany
9	Netherlands
10	Belgium
11	Estonia
12	Finland
13	Czech Republic
14	Slovakia
15	Croatia
16	Belarus

2015 Men's European Championship

France
1st title

14–man roster
Jonas Aguenier, Jenia Grebennikov, Antonin Rouzier, Benjamin Toniutti (c), Kévin Tillie, Earvin N'Gapeth, Kévin Le Roux, Julien Lyneel, Pierre Pujol, Nicolas Le Goff, Nicolas Maréchal, Franck Lafitte, Nicolas Rossard, Mory Sidibé
Head coach
Laurent Tillie

== Awards ==
- Most valuable player
  (France) Antonin Rouzier
- Best setter
  (Italy) Simone Giannelli
- Best outside spikers
  (Slovenia) Tine Urnaut
  (France) Earvin N'Gapeth
- Best middle blockers
  (Bulgaria) Teodor Todorov
  (Bulgaria) Viktor Yosifov
- Best opposite spiker
  (Italy) Ivan Zaytsev
- Best libero
  (France) Jenia Grebennikov
- Fair play award
  (Bulgaria) Vladimir Nikolov
