= Nicolas Rossard =

French volleyball player (born 1990)

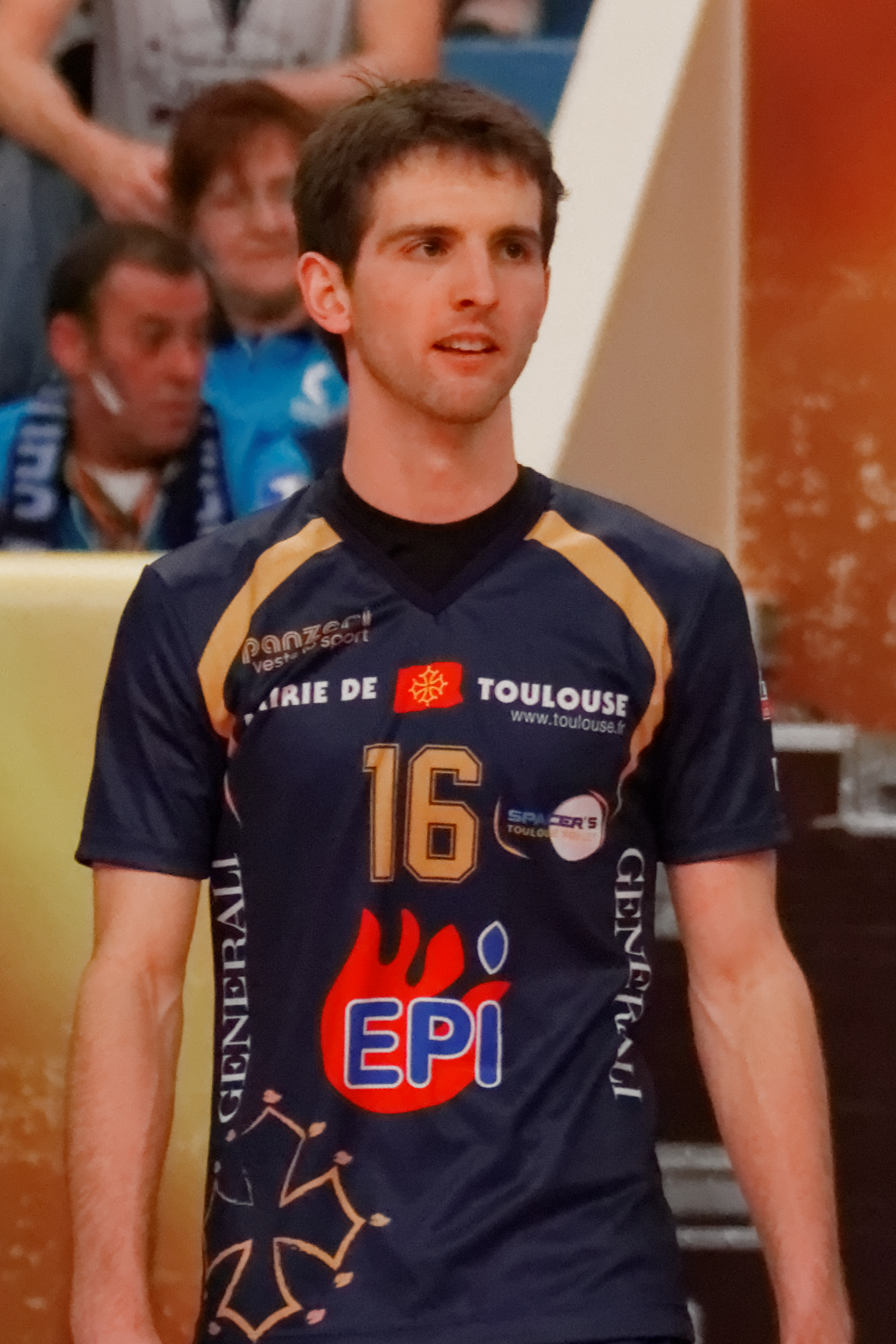

Personal information
- Nationality: French
- Born: 23 May 1990 (age 36); Nîmes, France
- Height: 1.83 m (6 ft 0 in)

Volleyball information
- Position: Libero

Career
Years	Teams
2009–2013; 2013–2016; 2016–2017; 2017–2018; 2018; 2018–2019; 2019–2021	Spacer's de Toulouse; Arago de Sète; Spacer's de Toulouse; Paris Volley; Stocznia Szczecin; Berlin Recycling Volleys; Tours VB

National team
France
Honours
Men's volleyball
Representing France
FIVB World League
Gold medal – first place	2017 Curitiba
CEV European Championship
Gold medal – first place	2015 Bulgaria/Italy

Nicolas Rossard (born 23 May 1990) is a French former professional volleyball player. As a member of his national team, he won the 2015 European Championship and the 2017 World League.

== Personal life ==
His cousins, Quentin and Thibault are also volleyball players, as was their grandfather Jacques Rossard.

== Honours ==
=== Club ===
- Domestic
  - 2015–16 French Championship, with Arago de Sète
  - 2016–17 French Championship, with Spacer's de Toulouse
  - 2017–18 German Championship, with Berlin Recycling Volleys

=== Youth national team ===
- 2008 CEV U20 European Championship
