= Julien Lyneel =

French volleyball player (born 1990)

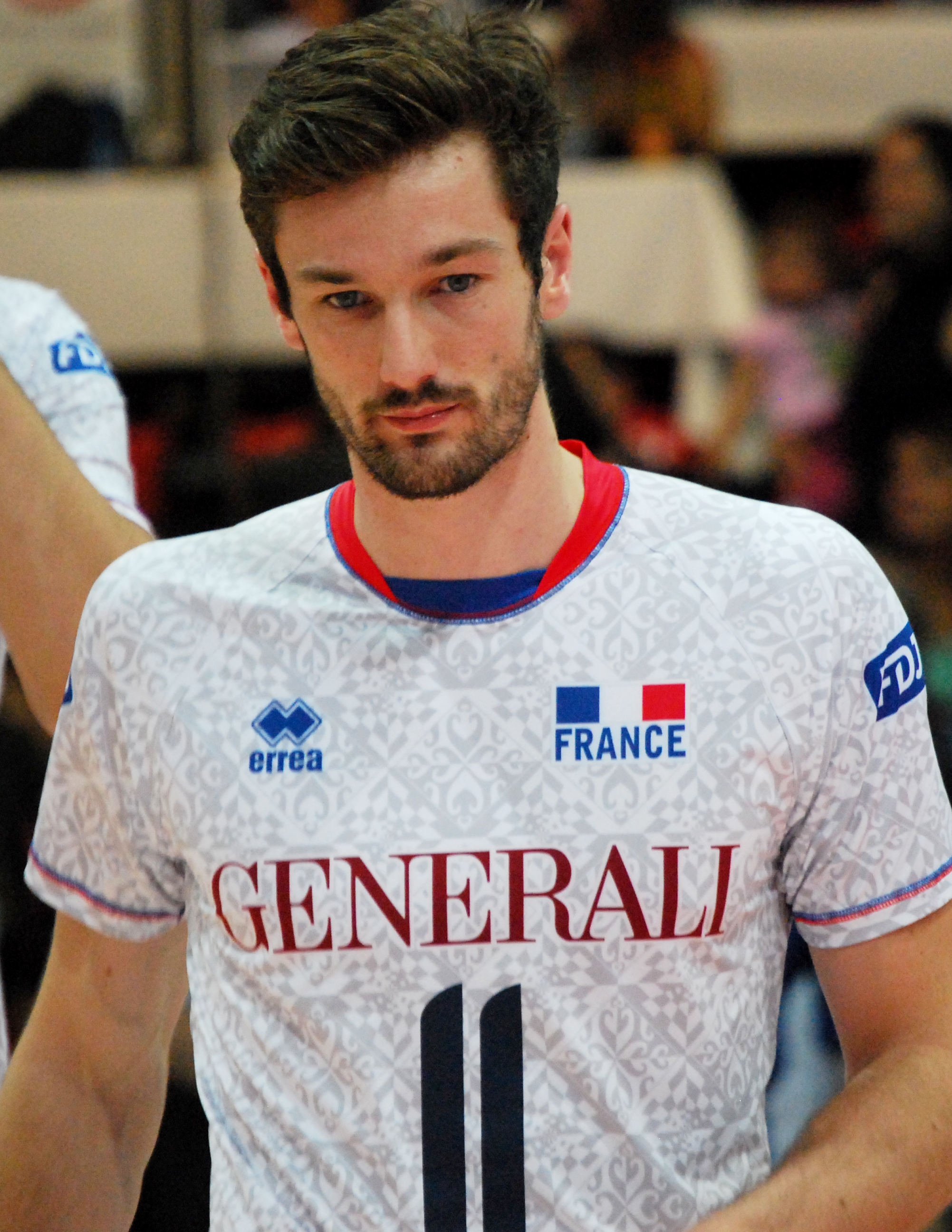

Personal information
- Nationality: French
- Born: 15 April 1990 (age 36); Montpellier, France
- Height: 1.92 m (6 ft 4 in)

Volleyball information
- Position: Outside hitter

Career
Years	Teams
2009–2015; 2015–2016; 2016–2017; 2017–2018; 2018–2020; 2020; 2021–2022	Montpellier Volley; Asseco Resovia; Bunge Ravenna; Shanghai Volleyball; Jastrzębski Węgiel; Volley Callipo; Montpellier Volley

National team
2011–2021	France
Honours
Men's volleyball
Representing France
FIVB Nations League
Silver medal – second place	2018 Lille
Bronze medal – third place	2021 Rimini
FIVB World League
Gold medal – first place	2015 Rio de Janeiro
Gold medal – first place	2017 Curitiba
Bronze medal – third place	2016 Kraków
CEV European Championship
Gold medal – first place	2015 Bulgaria/Italy

Julien Lyneel (born 15 April 1990) is a French former professional indoor volleyball player and currently a beach volleyball player. He was a member of the France national team from 2011 to 2021. The 2015 European Champion, and a two–time World League winner (2015, 2017).

== Career ==
=== Club ===
In July 2015, he signed a contract with the Polish team, Asseco Resovia.

=== National team ===
He debuted in the French national team in 2011. On 18 October 2015, the French national team, including Lyneel, achieved a title of the 2015 European Champion with a 3–0 win against Slovenia in the final.

== Honours ==
=== Club ===
- Domestic
  - 2015–16 Polish Championship, with Asseco Resovia
  - 2017–18 Chinese Championship, with Shanghai Golden Age
  - 2021–22 French Championship, with Montpellier Volley
