= Yoann Jaumel =

French volleyball player (born 1987)

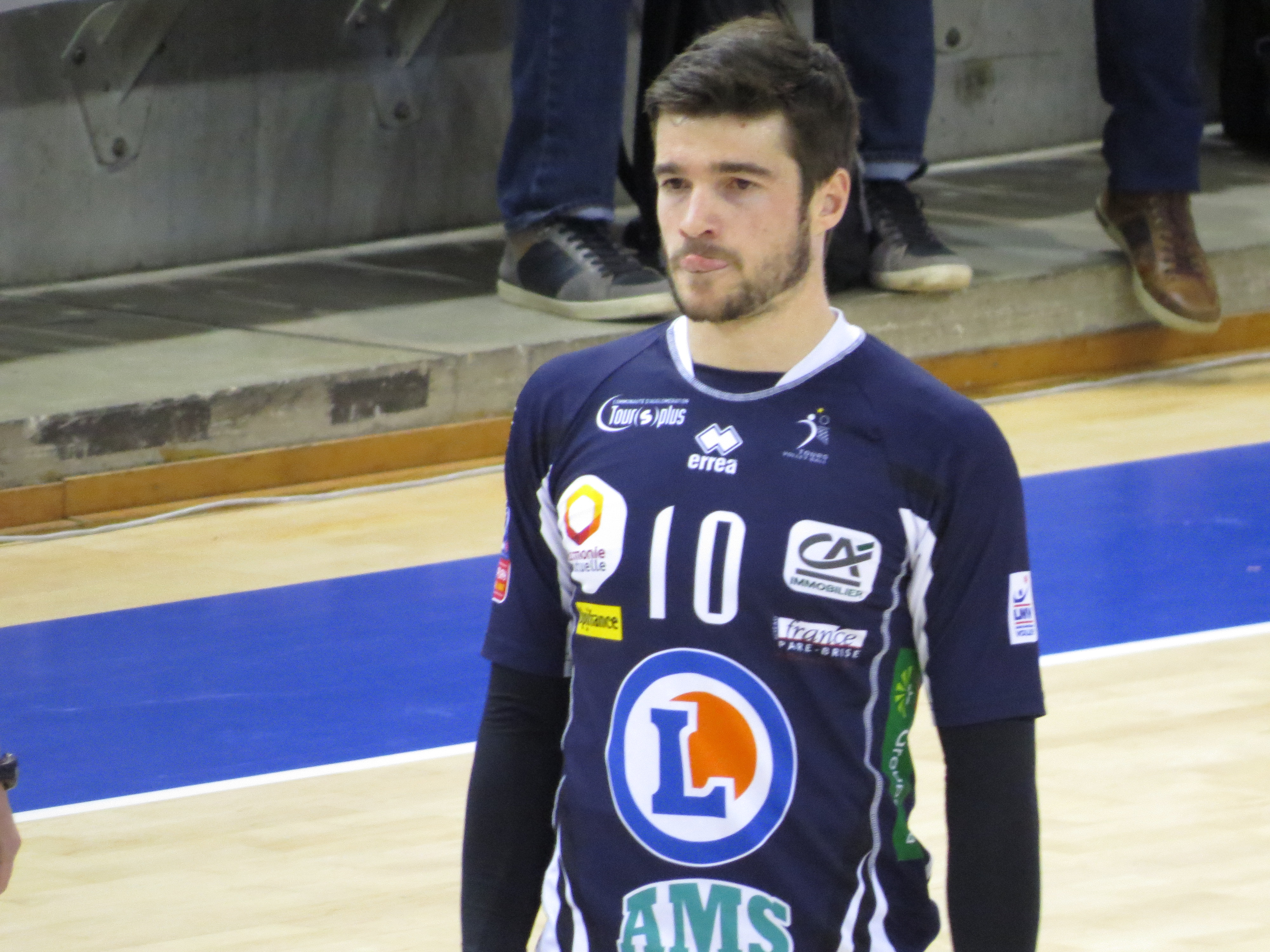

Personal information
- Nationality: French
- Born: 16 September 1987 (age 39) Montpellier, France
- Home town: Montpellier, France
- Height: 1.83 m (6 ft 0 in)
- Weight: 77 kg (170 lb)
- Spike: 320 cm (126 in)
- Block: 303 cm (119 in)

Volleyball information
- Position: Setter
- Current club: Volley Lube
- Number: 8 (National team); 10 (Volley Lube)

Career
- Years: Team
- 2006 - 2007 2007 - 2010 2010 - 2011 2011 - 2013 2013 - 2015 2015 - 2016 2016 - 2016 2016 -: (France) Stade Poitevin Poitiers (France) Montpellier UC (France) Martigues VB (France) Avignon VB (France) GFC Ajaccio (France) Tours VB (Italy) Volley Lube (France) Nice Volley Ball

National team
- Years: Team
- 2014 -: France
Honours
Representing France
Men's volleyball
World League
Gold medal – first place	2015 Rio de Janeiro

Yoann Jaumel (born 16 September 1987) is a French volleyball player. He was part of the France men's national volleyball team at the 2014 FIVB Volleyball Men's World Championship in Poland, and 2015 FIVB Volleyball World League in Rio de Janeiro. He is currently playing for Nice Volleyball.

He received the Best Setter award at the 2013 - 2014 season of Ligue A, and 2015 Memorial of Hubert Jerzy Wagner.

He is the son of Yves Jaumel, a former French Volleyball Player.
