= Kanat Gabdulin =

Kazakhstani volleyball player (born 1985)

Personal information
- Nationality: Kazakhstani
- Born: 4 March 1985 (age 41)
- Height: 194 cm (6 ft 4 in)
- Weight: 85 kg (187 lb)
- Spike: 330 cm (130 in)
- Block: 325 cm (128 in)

Volleyball information
- Number: 8 (national team)

Career
Years	Teams
2015	Almaty Vc

National team
2015	Kazakhstan

Kanat Gabdulin (born 4 March 1985) is a Kazakhstani male volleyball player.

== Career ==
Gabdulin is part of the Kazakhstan men's national volleyball team. On club level he plays for Almaty Vc.
