= Kévin Tillie =

French volleyball player (born 1990)

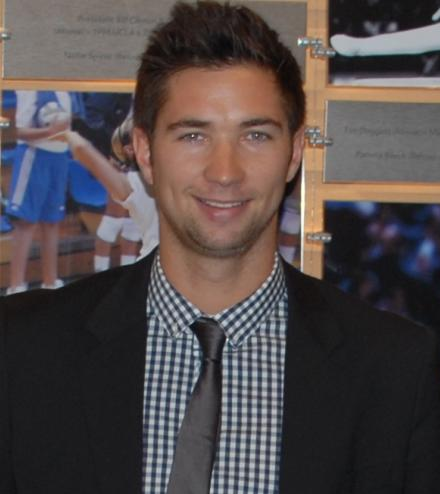
- Tillie in 2013

Personal information
- Full name: Kévin Peter Patrice Tillie
- Born: 2 November 1990 (age 35); Cagnes-sur-Mer, France
- Height: 2.00 m (6 ft 7 in)
- Weight: 85 kg (187 lb)
- Spike: 345 cm (136 in)
- Block: 325 cm (128 in)
- Education: Thompson Rivers University; University of California, Irvine

Volleyball information
- Position: Outside hitter
- Current club: PGE Projekt Warszawa
- Number: 7

Career
Years	Teams
2009–2011; 2011–2013; 2013–2014; 2014–2015; 2015–2017; 2017–2019; 2019; 2019–2020; 2020–2021; 2021–2022; 2022–	Thompson Rivers University; UC Irvine Anteaters; CMC Ravenna; Arkas İzmir; ZAKSA Kędzierzyn-Koźle; Beijing Volleyball; Modena Volley; Projekt Warsaw; Top Volley Cisterna; Tours VB; Projekt Warsaw

National team
2012–	France
Honours
Men's volleyball
Representing France
Olympic Games
Gold medal – first place	2020 Tokyo	Team
Gold medal – first place	2024 Paris	Team
FIVB World League
Gold medal – first place	2015 Rio de Janeiro
Bronze medal – third place	2016 Kraków
FIVB Nations League
Gold medal – first place	2024 Łódź
Silver medal – second place	2018 Lille
Bronze medal – third place	2021 Rimini
CEV European Championship
Gold medal – first place	2015 Bulgaria/Italy

Kévin Peter Patrice Tillie (born 2 November 1990) is a French professional volleyball player who plays as an outside hitter for PlusLiga club PGE Projekt Warszawa and the France national team. Tillie won a gold medal in the men's tournament at both the Olympic Games Tokyo 2020 and Paris 2024, and the European Champion title in 2015.

== Personal life ==
Tillie was born in Cagnes-sur-Mer, France. He is from an athletic family – his father Laurent is a volleyball coach and former player; his mother Caroline played at the professional and Olympic levels (as did Laurent); his older brother Kim played college basketball with the Utah Utes and now does professionally in Europe and with France; and his younger brother Killian played on a two-way contract with the NBA's Memphis Grizzlies and its G League affiliate, Memphis Hustle.

He is married to Anna Diakiewicz and has a daughter, Olivia.

== Career ==
After many appearances with the junior and youth national teams, Tillie debuted for the senior national team at the 2012 World League, where the French team finished in seventh place.

Tillie started his career at Thompson Rivers University for their athletic program Thompson Rivers WolfPack in Kamloops British Columbia. Kevin played with fellow Olympian Gord Perrin in his first year. In his second year he was second in the country in both kills per set and total kills, with 400. He made the All-Canadian Team honors averaging 4.41 kills per set. Tellie's second year setter is UBC Thunderbirds Headcoach, Mike Hawkins

After playing for the TRU WolfPack, Tillie transferred to the University of California, Irvine Anteaters for the 2012 and 2013 seasons. Tillie was instrumental to UC Irvine as they made back to back NCAA championship runs those two years. Tillie earned AVCA All-American honors for both years.

In 2015, he moved to the Polish PlusLiga team, ZAKSA Kędzierzyn-Koźle and in his first professional season won the 2015–16 championship. In May 2016, he extended his contract until 2017, and the following season once again won the championship, as well as the national cup.

== Honours ==
=== Club ===
- CEV Cup
  - 2021–22 – with Tours VB
- CEV Challenge Cup
  - 2023–24 – with Projekt Warsaw
- Domestic
  - 2014–15 Turkish Championship, with Arkas İzmir
  - 2015–16 Polish Championship, with ZAKSA Kędzierzyn-Koźle
  - 2016–17 Polish Cup, with ZAKSA Kędzierzyn-Koźle
  - 2016–17 Polish Championship, with ZAKSA Kędzierzyn-Koźle

=== College ===
- Domestic
  - 2012 NCAA National Championship, with UC Irvine Anteaters
  - 2013 NCAA National Championship, with UC Irvine Anteaters

=== Youth national team ===
- 2008 CEV U20 European Championship

=== Individual awards ===
- 2017: Polish Cup – Best receiver

=== State awards ===
- 2021: Knight of the Legion of Honour
