= Nicolas Maréchal =

French volleyball player (born 1987)

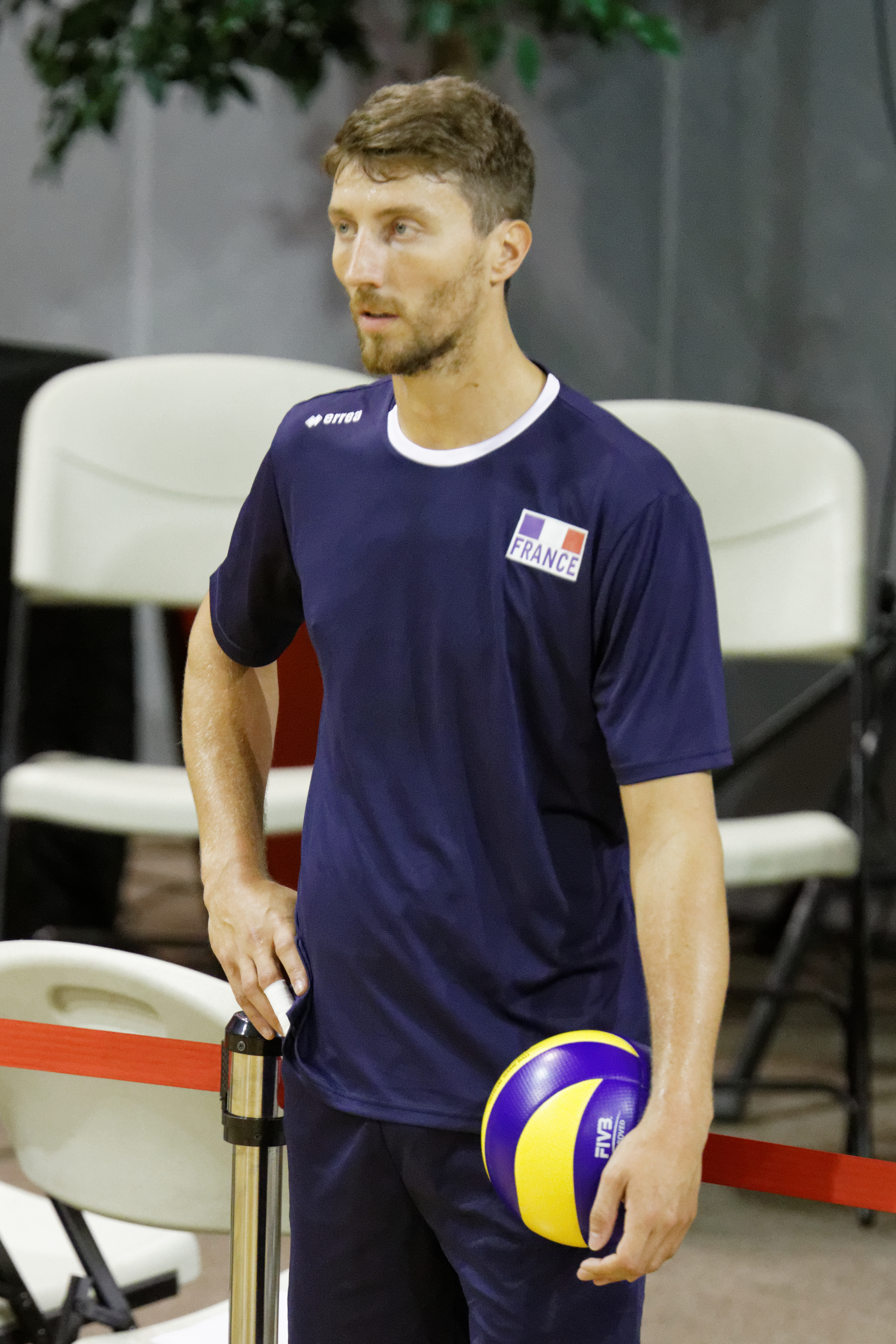

Personal information
- Nationality: French; Polish
- Born: 4 March 1987 (age 39); Sainte-Catherine, France
- Height: 1.98 m (6 ft 6 in)
- Weight: 94 kg (207 lb)
- Spike: 350 cm (138 in)
- Block: 340 cm (134 in)

Volleyball information
- Position: Outside hitter
- Current club: Kochi Blue Spikers
- Number: 16

Career
Years	Teams
2005–2006; 2006–2009; 2009–2012; 2012–2013; 2013–2014; 2014–2016; 2016–2017; 2017–2018; 2018–2019; 2019–2020; 2020–2021; 2021–2022; 2022; 2022-2023; 2024; 2025	Harnes VB; Tourcoing LM; Stade Poitevin Poitiers; AS Cannes; Jastrzębski Węgiel; Skra Bełchatów; İstanbul BBSK; Bunge Ravenna; Yenisey Krasnoyarsk; Asseco Resovia; VfB Friedrichshafen; Ural Ufa; Tours VB; Modena Volley; AL Caudry Volleyball; Kochi Blue Spikers

National team
2008–2016	France
Honours
Men's volleyball
Representing France
FIVB World League
Gold medal – first place	2015 Rio de Janeiro
Bronze medal – third place	2016 Kraków
CEV European Championship
Gold medal – first place	2015 Bulgaria/Italy

Nicolas Maréchal (born 4 March 1987) is a French professional volleyball player with Polish citizenship (since 8 April 2013), a former member of the France national team. The 2015 European Champion, and the 2015 World League winner. At the professional club level, he plays for Modena Volley.

== Personal life ==
On 4 August 2015, his girlfriend Vatsana Phrasathane gave birth to their son Nathan.

== Career ==
He played for Polish club Jastrzębski Węgiel in the 2013/2014 season, winning a bronze medal in the Polish Championship 2012/2013 and another in the CEV Champions League 2014 after winning a match against VC Zenit-Kazan. In 2014 he left Jastrzębski Węgiel. On May 29, 2014, it was announced that Marechal would play for PGE Skra Bełchatów in the upcoming 2014/2015 season. On October 8, 2014 his team won ENEA Polish SuperCup 2014. On October 18, 2015 French national team, including Marechal, achieved title of the European Champion 2015 (3–0 with Slovenia in the finale). On February 7, 2016 he played with PGE Skra and won the 2016 Polish Cup after beating ZAKSA in the final. In April 2016 he was a member of the same team which won a bronze medal in the 2015–16 PlusLiga championship. Few days later, he left club and went to Turkish team İstanbul Belediyesi. In 2020 he started playing for german club VFB Friedrichshafen

== Honours ==
=== Club ===
- CEV Cup
  - 2022–23 – with Valsa Group Modena
- CEV Challenge Cup
  - 2017–18 – with Bunge Ravenna
- Domestic
  - 2008–09 French Championship, with Tourcoing LM
  - 2010–11 French Championship, with Stade Poitevin Poitiers
  - 2011–12 French Championship, with Stade Poitevin Poitiers
  - 2014–15 Polish SuperCup, with PGE Skra Bełchatów
  - 2015–16 Polish Cup, with PGE Skra Bełchatów

=== Youth national team ===
- 2005 CEV U19 European Championship
- 2006 CEV U20 European Championship

=== Individual awards ===
- 2012: French Championship – Best receiver

=== Statistics ===
- 2014–15 PlusLiga – Best server (58 aces)
