= Antonin Rouzier =

French volleyball player

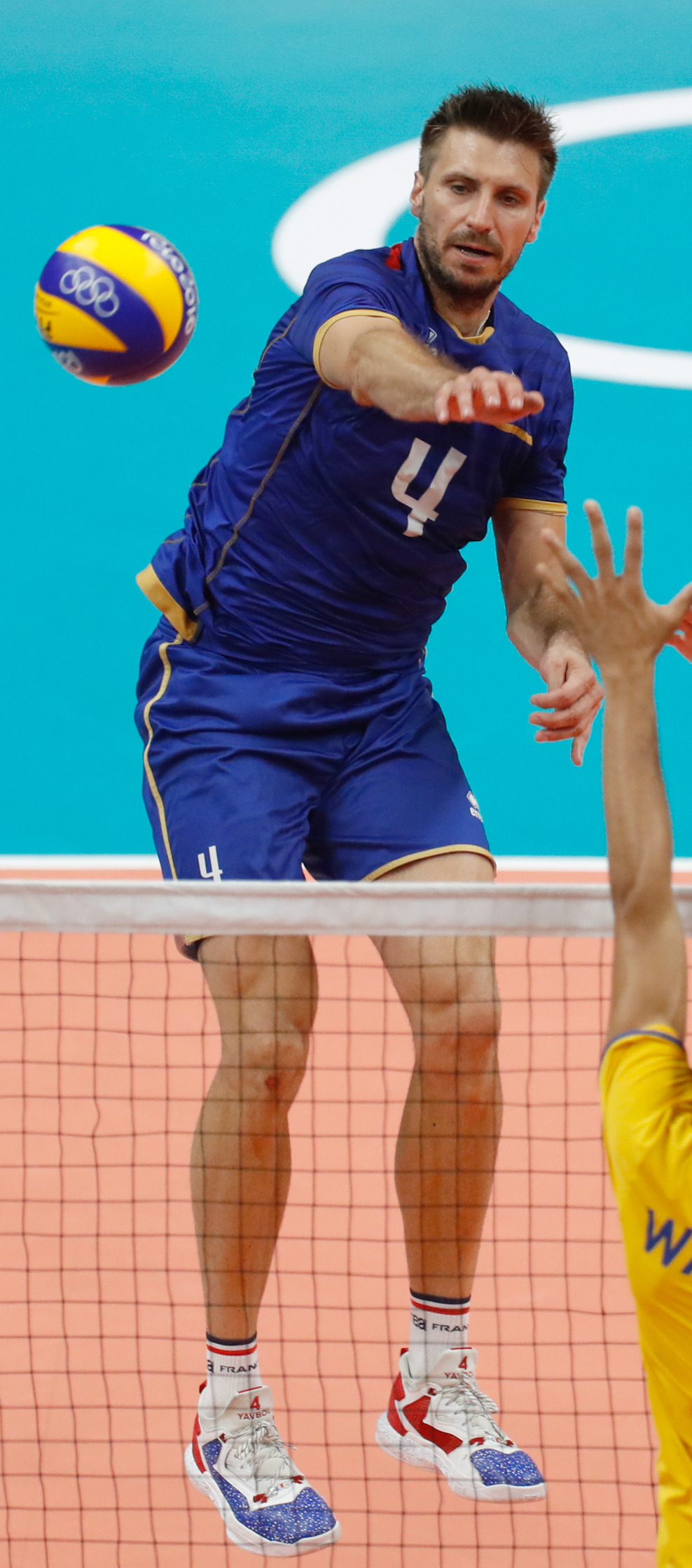

Personal information
- Nationality: French
- Born: 18 August 1986 (age 40); Saint-Martin-d'Hères, France
- Height: 2.01 m (6 ft 7 in)
- Weight: 100 kg (220 lb)
- Spike: 350 cm (138 in)
- Block: 330 cm (130 in)

Volleyball information
- Position: Opposite

Career
Years	Teams
2004–2005; 2005–2006; 2006–2007; 2007–2008; 2008–2009; 2009–2011; 2011–2013; 2013–2014; 2014–2015; 2015–2016; 2016–2017; 2017–2018; 2018–2020; 2018–2020; 2020–2021	Spacer's de Toulouse; Beauvais Oise UC; Asnières Volley 92; Montpellier Volley; Knack Roeselare; Stade Poitevin Poitiers; ZAKSA Kędzierzyn-Koźle; Piemonte Volley; Ziraat Bankası Ankara; Arkas İzmir; İstanbul BBSK; Yenisey Krasnoyarsk; Toray Arrows; Al Rayyan; Paris Volley

National team
2006–2016	France
Honours
Men's volleyball
Representing France
FIVB World League
Gold medal – first place	2015 Rio de Janeiro
Bronze medal – third place	2016 Kraków
CEV European Championship
Gold medal – first place	2015 Bulgaria/Italy
Silver medal – second place	2009 Turkey

Antonin Rouzier (born 18 August 1986) is a French former professional volleyball player, a former member of the France national team. A participant in the Olympic Games Rio 2016, 2015 European Champion and the 2015 World League winner.

== Personal life ==
Rouzier was born in Saint-Martin-d'Hères, France. On 27 July 2014 Antonin married to Lili. In May 2016 his wife gave birth to their son Louis.

== Career ==
In 2011–2013 Rouzier played for the Polish club ZAKSA Kędzierzyn-Koźle. He won bronze (2011/2012) and silver (2012/2013) of Polish Championship, Polish Cup 2013. In season 2013/2014 moved to Bre Banca Lannutti Cuneo. After financial problems of the Italian club decided to leave team from Cuneo. In June 2014 moved to Turkish Ziraat Bankası Ankara. On 18 October 2015 French national team, including Rouzier, achieved title of the European Champion 2015 (3–0 with Slovenia in the finale). He received individual award for the Most valuable player of the championships.

In May 2017 he signed one-year contract with Russian club Yenisey Krasnoyarsk.

== Honours ==
=== Clubs ===
- National championships
  - 2008/2009 Belgian Championship, with Knack Roeselare
  - 2010/2011 French Championship, with Stade Poitevin Poitiers
  - 2012/2013 Polish Cup, with ZAKSA Kędzierzyn-Koźle
  - 2012/2013 Polish Championship, with ZAKSA Kędzierzyn-Koźle

=== Individual awards ===
- 2009: CEV European Championship – Best scorer
- 2011: French Championship – Best opposite
- 2013: CEV Champions League – Best spiker
- 2015: CEV European Championship – Most valuable player
- 2016: FIVB World League – Best outside spiker

Awards
Preceded by (Serbia) Ivan Miljković	Best Scorer of CEV European Championship; 2009	Succeeded by (Russia) Maksim Mikhaylov
Preceded by (Poland) Bartosz Kurek	Best Spiker of CEV Champions League; 2012/2013	Succeeded by (Russia) Maksim Mikhaylov
Preceded by (Russia) Dmitry Muserskiy	Most Valuable Player of CEV European Championship; 2015	Succeeded by (Russia) Maksim Mikhaylov
Preceded by (Poland) Michał Kubiak (France) Earvin N'Gapeth	Best Outside Spiker of FIVB World League; 2016 ex aequo (Serbia) Marko Ivović	Succeeded by (Brazil) Ricardo Lucarelli (France) Earvin N'Gapeth
