= Franck Lafitte =

French volleyball player (born 1989)

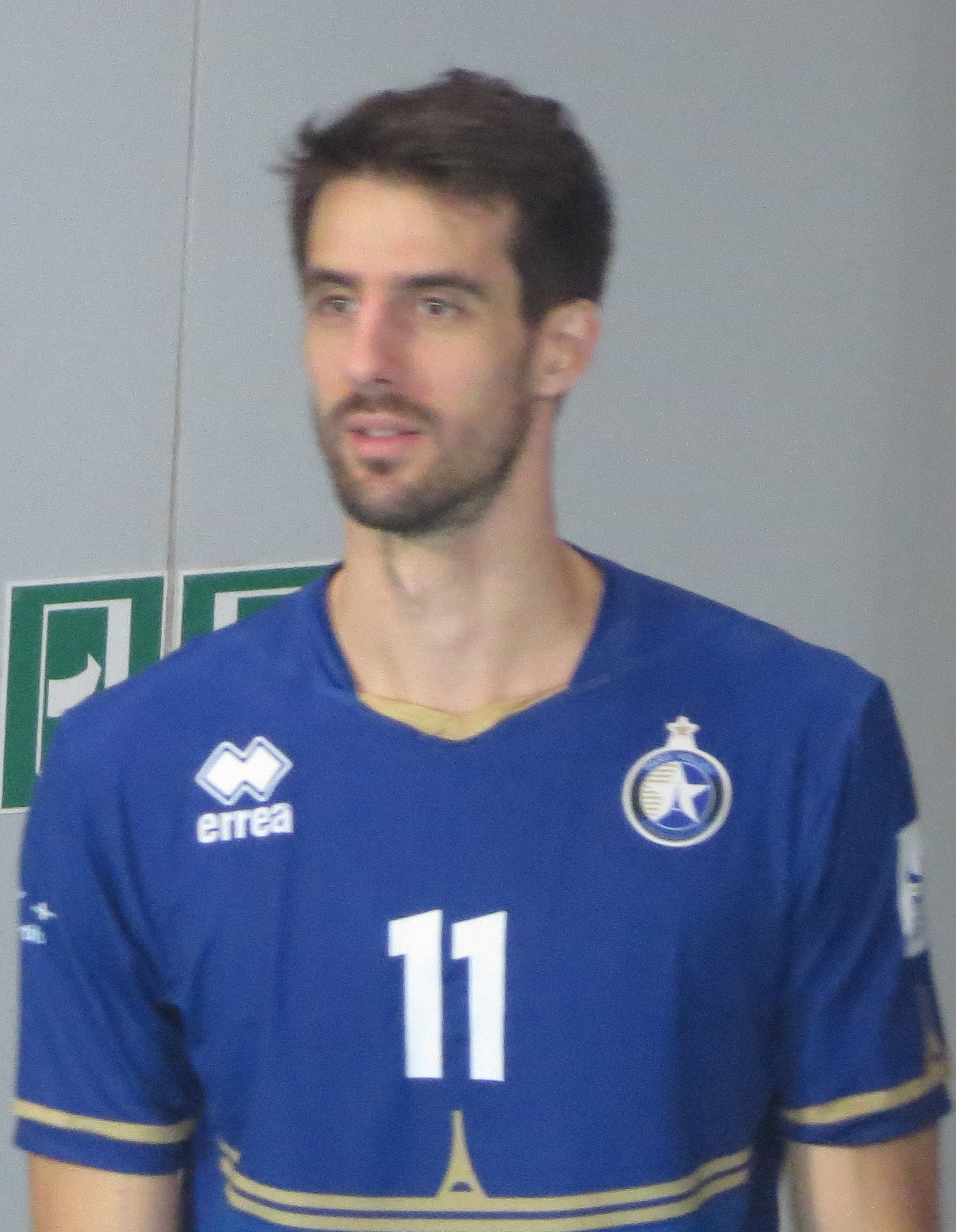
- Franck Lafitte, 2019

Personal information
- Nationality: French
- Born: 8 March 1989 (age 37); Saint-Martin-d'Hères, France
- Height: 2.03 m (6 ft 8 in)
- Weight: 95 kg (209 lb)
- Spike: 350 cm (138 in)
- Block: 330 cm (130 in)

Volleyball information
- Position: Middle blocker
- Current club: Paris Volley
- Number: 11

Career
Years	Teams
2007–2008; 2008–2010; 2010–2015; 2015–2016; 2016–	Grenoble UVC; Spacer's de Toulouse; Montpellier UC; Arago de Sète; Paris Volley

National team
2011–	France
Honours
Men's volleyball
Representing France
World League
Gold medal – first place	2015 Rio de Janeiro
Bronze medal – third place	2016 Kraków
European Championship
Gold medal – first place	2015 Bulgaria/Italy
Mediterranean Games
Bronze medal – third place	2013 Turkey
- Last updated: 2 January 2018

Franck Lafitte (born 8 March 1989) is a French male volleyball player. He was part of the France men's national volleyball team at the 2014 FIVB Volleyball Men's World Championship in Poland. He played for Montpellier UC.

== Clubs ==
- Montpellier UC (2014)
