= Mory Sidibé =

French volleyball player (born 1987)

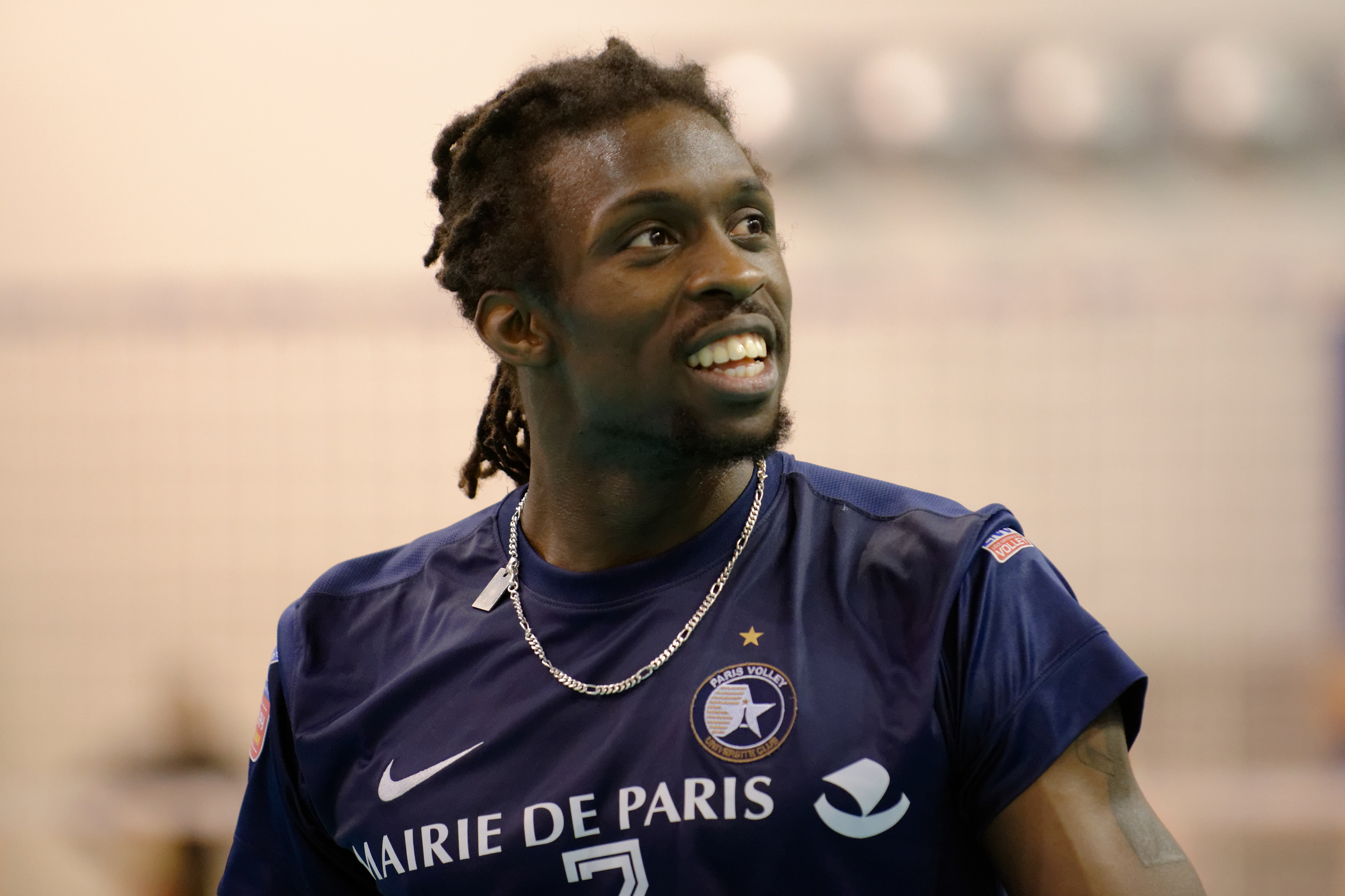

Personal information
- Full name: Mory Sidibé
- Nickname: Wallace
- Nationality: French
- Born: June 17, 1987 (age 39); Noisy-le-Grand, France
- Height: 1.93 m (6 ft 4 in)
- Weight: 92 kg (203 lb)
- Spike: 367 cm (144 in)
- Block: 330 cm (130 in)

Volleyball information
- Position: Opposite
- Current club: Omonia Nicosia
- Number: 17

Career
Years	Teams
2006–2008; 2008–2009; 2009–2010; 2010–2011; 2011–2012; 2012–2013; 2013–2014; 2014–2015; 2016; 2017–	Stade Poitevin Poitiers; Saint-Brieuc CAVB; Bozkurt BK; Noliko Maaseik; Copra Elior Piacenza; ACH Volley Ljubljana; Paris Volley; Sichuan Chengdu; Sumsel Babel; Omonia Nicosia

National team
2011–2016	France
Honours
Men's volleyball
Representing France
European Championship
Gold medal – first place	2015 Bulgaria/Italy
World League
Gold medal – first place	2015 Rio de Janeiro
- Last updated: 1 January 2018

Mory Sidibé (born 17 June 1987) is a French volleyball player, a member of France men's national volleyball team and Cypriot club Omonia Nicosia, 2015 European Champion, a gold medalist of the 2015 World League.

== Career ==
On October 18, 2015 French national team, including Sidibe, achieved title of the European Champion 2015 (3–0 with Slovenia in the finale).

== Sporting achievements ==
=== Clubs ===
==== National championships ====
- 2006/2007 French Championship, with Stade Poitevin Poitiers
- 2007/2008 French Championship, with Stade Poitevin Poitiers
- 2010/2011 Belgium Championship, with Noliko Maaseik
- 2012/2013 Slovenian Cup, with ACH Volley Ljubljana
- 2012/2013

Slovenian Championship, with ACH Volley Ljubljana

- 2013/2014

Paris volley

- 2013/2014 silver medal French cup

Paris volley

- 2013/2014
- winner Cev European Cup
- silver medal French championship
- 2017/2018 Cyprus Cup, with Omonia Nicosia

Mvp of the season

=== National team ===
- 2005 CEV U19 European Championship
- 2006 CEV U21 European Championship
- 2015 FIVB World League
- 2015 CEV European Championship
