= Laurent Tillie =

French volleyball player and coach (born 1963)

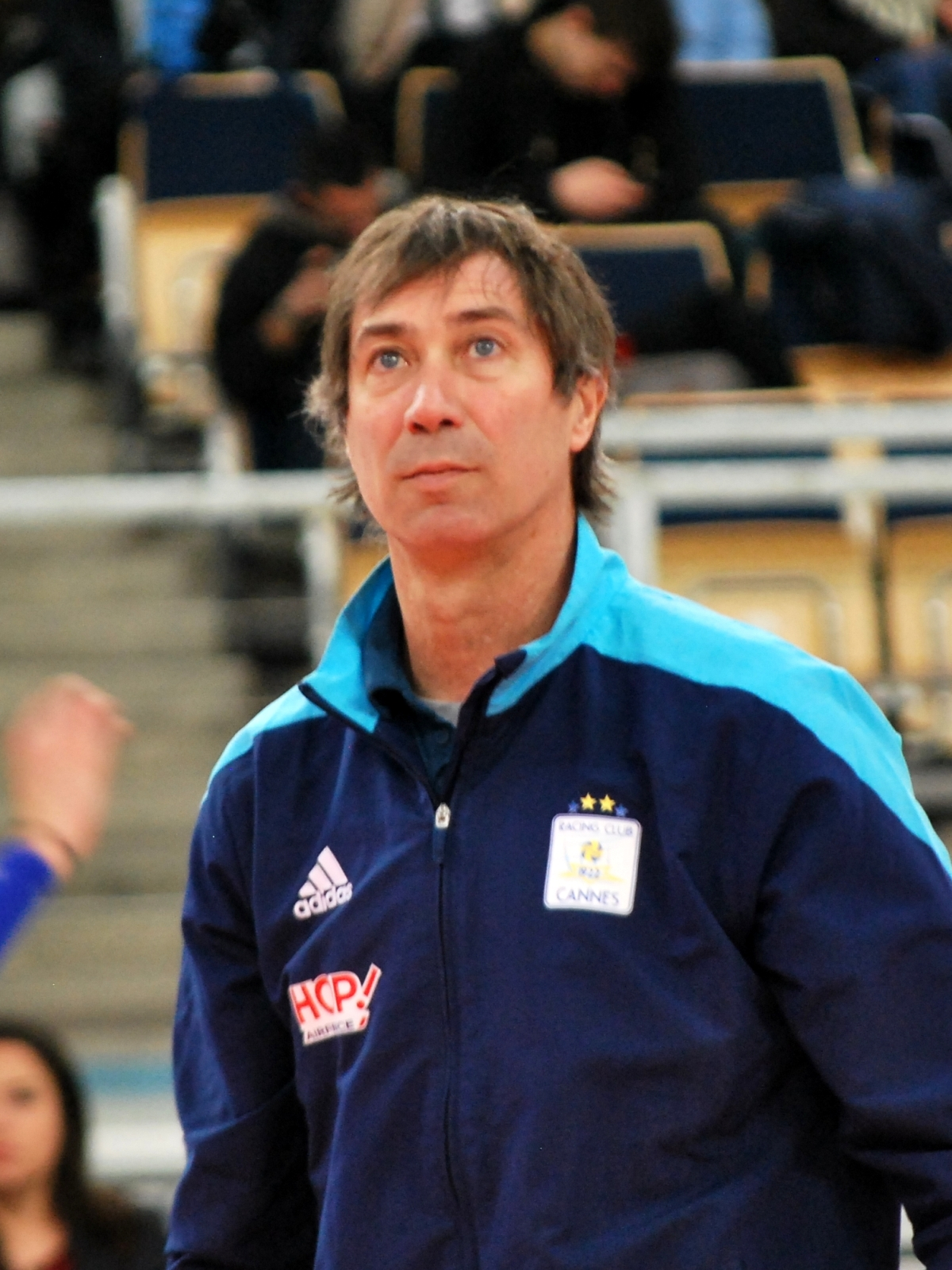

Personal information
- Nationality: French
- Born: 1 December 1963 (age 62); Algiers, Algeria
- Height: 1.93 m (6 ft 4 in)

Coaching information
- Current team: Osaka Bluteon
Previous teams coached
Years	Teams
2001–2012; 2005–2006; 2012–2021; 2016–2017; 2020–2025; 2025-	AS Cannes; Czech Republic; France; RC Cannes; Osaka Bluteon; Japan

Volleyball information
- Position: Outside hitter

Career
Years	Teams
1980–1984; 1986–1987; 1987–1991; 1991–1995; 1995–1998; 1998–2001; 2001–2002	AS Cannes; Pallavolo Falconara; AS Cannes; Pallavolo Falconara; Paris UC; Nice VB; AS Cannes

National team
1982–1995	France (406)
Honours
Men's volleyball
Representing France
CEV European Championship
Silver medal – second place	1987 Belgium
Bronze medal – third place	1985 Netherlands
Head coach France
Olympic Games
Gold medal – first place	2020 Tokyo
FIVB World League
Gold medal – first place	2015 Rio de Janeiro
Gold medal – first place	2017 Curitiba
Bronze medal – third place	2016 Kraków
FIVB Nations League
Silver medal – second place	2018 Lille
Bronze medal – third place	2021 Rimini
AVC Asian Championship
Gold medal – first place	2026 Fukuoka
CEV European Championship
Gold medal – first place	2015 Italy/Bulgaria

Laurent Tillie (born 1 December 1963) is a French professional volleyball coach and former player. He was a member of the France national team from 1982 to 1995 and took part in 2 Olympic Games (Seoul 1988, Barcelona 1992). He serves as head coach for the Japanese team, Osaka Bluteon.

== Personal life ==
Tillie earned a Bachelor of Science in Movement and Education in 1984, as well as a Diploma of Physiotherapy and Kinesiology in 1991, from the University of Nice. Tillie is a father of three: Kevin, Kim, and Killian, as well as the husband to the former Dutch national team captain, Caroline Keulen. Kim graduated from the University of Utah where he played for the Utah Utes men's basketball team. He went on to make the Men’s French National team, winning a bronze medal at the 2014 World Cup. Kevin attended the University of California, Irvine, where he became a 2-time NCAA Volleyball Champion with the UC Irvine Anteaters men's volleyball team, and is currently a member of the France men’s national team. The youngest, Killian, played for the Gonzaga Bulldogs men's basketball team at Gonzaga University.He is currently playing for the Memphis Grizzlies of the NBA. Killian was also in the France national team developmental system, winning a gold medal with France at the 2014 FIBA Europe Under-16 Championship and being named MVP of that competition.

== Career ==
=== As a player ===
Tillie was part of the France men's national volleyball team between 1982 and 1995, playing in total 407 international matches. He served as team captain from 1991 to 1992. France won a bronze medal at the 1985 European Championship and a silver medal two years later. His team qualified for World Championships in 1982, 1986, and 1990 and represented their country at the 1988 Summer Olympics in Seoul and 1992 Summer Olympics in Barcelona. Tillie played professionally for AS Cannes, Paris, Nice and Falconara in Italy.

=== As a coach ===
After his playing career Tillie went into volleyball coaching, returning to Cannes in 2001. His team became French champions in 2005, and French Cup winner in 2007. In 2005, Tillie assumed more responsibility serving as the head coach for the Czech Republic men's national volleyball team. He led this team to 9th place at the 2005 European Championship and qualification for the 2006 World Championships. He remained with AS Cannes until he accepted the position as the head coach of the France men's national volleyball team in July 2012. In 2013 and 2014 the French team finished 10th at World League and just a few months later, France finished 4th at the 2014 Men’s World Championship in Poland. He coached the French men's national volleyball team to the 2015 World League Championship in Rio. At the Tokyo 2020 Olympics he coached his team to the gold medal, defeating the ROC in five sets.

== Honours ==
=== As a player ===
- CEV European Champions Cup
  - 1982–83 – with AS Cannes
- CEV Challenge Cup
  - 1980–81 – with AS Cannes
- Domestic
  - 1980–81 French Championship, with AS Cannes
  - 1981–82 French Championship, with AS Cannes
  - 1982–83 French Championship, with AS Cannes
  - 1989–90 French Championship, with AS Cannes
  - 1990–91 French Championship, with AS Cannes
  - 1995–96 French Championship, with Paris UC
  - 1996–97 French Cup, with Paris UC
  - 1996–97 French Championship, with Paris UC
  - 1997–98 French Championship, with Paris UC

=== As a coach ===
- Domestic
  - 2004–05 French Championship, with AS Cannes
  - 2006–07 French Cup, with AS Cannes

=== Individual awards ===
- 2021: CEV – Coach of the year
