= Jonas Aguenier =

French volleyball player (born 1992)

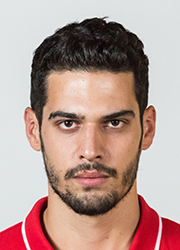

Personal information
- Full name: Jonas Bastien Baptiste Aguenier
- Nationality: (France) French
- Born: 28 April 1992 (age 34)
- Height: 2.02 m (6 ft 8 in)
- Weight: 92 kg (203 lb)
- Spike: 344 cm (135 in)
- Block: 331 cm (130 in)

Volleyball information
- Position: Middle blocker
- Current club: (Italy) NBV Verona
- Number: 7

Career
Years	Teams
2011–2014; 2014–2016; 2016–2018; 2018–2019; 2019–2021	(France) Nantes Rezé Métropole (France) AS Cannes (France) Chaumont VB 52 (Italy) Monini Spoleto (Italy) BluVolley Verona

National team
2013–	France
Honours
Men's volleyball
Representing France
FIVB World League
Gold medal – first place	2015 Rio de Janeiro
FIVB Nations League
Silver medal – second place	2018 Lille
CEV European Championship
Gold medal – first place	2015 Bulgaria/Italy

Jonas Bastien Baptiste Aguenier (born 28 April 1992) is a French volleyball player. He was part of the French national team at the 2014 World Championship held in Poland. On club level, he plays for Italian team NBV Verona.

== Sporting achievements ==
=== Clubs ===
- CEV Challenge Cup
  - 2016/2017 – with Chaumont VB 52
- National championships
  - 2016/2017 French Championship, with Chaumont VB 52
  - 2017/2018 French SuperCup, with Chaumont VB 52
