= Kadir Cin =

Turkish volleyball player

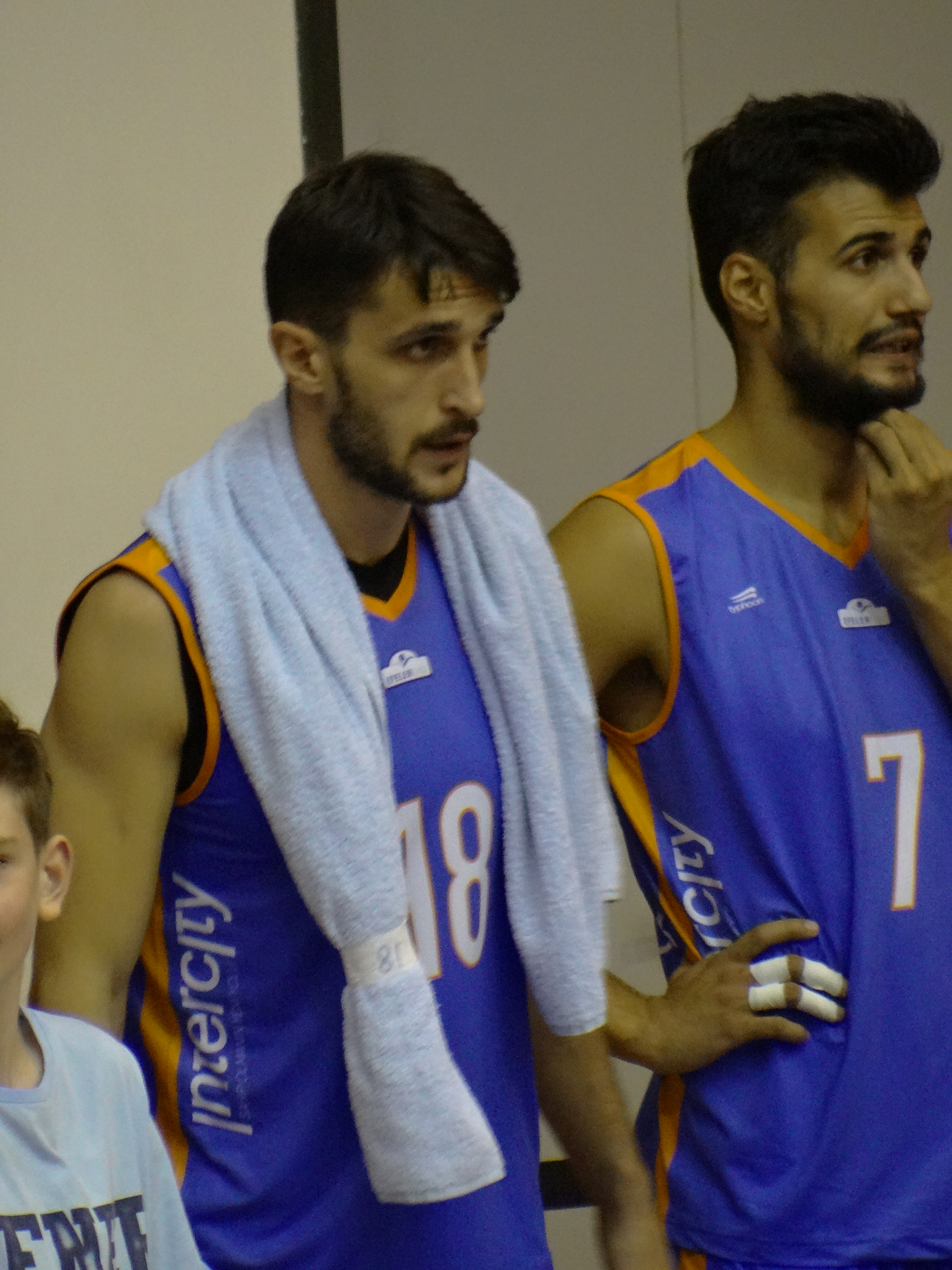

Personal information
- Nationality: Turkish
- Born: 7 May 1987 (age 39)
- Height: 2.00 m (6 ft 7 in)
- Weight: 97 kg (214 lb)
- Spike: 356 cm (140 in)
- Block: 343 cm (135 in)

Volleyball information
- Position: Outside spiker
- Current club: Arkas İzmir
- Number: 15

National team
Turkey

Kadir Cin (born 7 May 1987) is a Turkish volleyball player. He plays for Arkas İzmir.
