= 2019 FIVB Men's Volleyball Intercontinental Olympic Qualification Tournaments squads =

This article shows all participating team squads at the Intercontinental Qualification Tournament for the 2020 Men's Olympic Volleyball Tournament, held in various cities from 9–11 August 2019.

== Pool A ==
=== Brazil ===
The following is the Brazilian roster in the 2019 Intercontinental Olympic Qualification Tournament.

Head Coach: Renan Dal Zotto

No.	Name	Date of birth	Height	Weight	Spike	Block	2019 club
1	Bruno Rezende (C)	2 July 1986	1.9 m (6 ft 3 in)	76 kg (168 lb)	323 cm (127 in)	302 cm (119 in)	(Italy) Cucine Lube Civitanova
2	Isac Santos	13 December 1990	2.08 m (6 ft 10 in)	99 kg (218 lb)	339 cm (133 in)	306 cm (120 in)	(Brazil) Sada Cruzeiro Vôlei
3	Éder Carbonera	19 October 1983	2.05 m (6 ft 9 in)	107 kg (236 lb)	360 cm (140 in)	330 cm (130 in)	(Brazil) SESI-SP
4	Lucas Lóh	18 January 1991	1.95 m (6 ft 5 in)	83 kg (183 lb)	336 cm (132 in)	320 cm (130 in)	(Brazil) SESI-SP
5	Maurício Borges Silva	4 February 1989	1.99 m (6 ft 6 in)	99 kg (218 lb)	335 cm (132 in)	315 cm (124 in)	(Brazil) SESC-RJ
6	Fernando Kreling	13 January 1996	1.85 m (6 ft 1 in)	85 kg (187 lb)	319 cm (126 in)	301 cm (119 in)	(Brazil) Sada Cruzeiro Vôlei
7	William Arjona	31 July 1979	1.86 m (6 ft 1 in)	78 kg (172 lb)	300 cm (120 in)	295 cm (116 in)	(Brazil) SESI-SP
8	Wallace de Souza	26 June 1987	1.98 m (6 ft 6 in)	87 kg (192 lb)	344 cm (135 in)	318 cm (125 in)	(Brazil) SESC-RJ
9	Yoandy Leal	31 August 1988	2.02 m (6 ft 8 in)	107 kg (236 lb)	361 cm (142 in)	348 cm (137 in)	(Italy) Cucine Lube Civitanova
10	Raphael Vieira de Oliveira	14 June 1979	1.9 m (6 ft 3 in)	82 kg (181 lb)	330 cm (130 in)	306 cm (120 in)	(Brazil) Funvic Taubaté
11	Rodrigo Leão	5 June 1996	1.97 m (6 ft 6 in)	85 kg (187 lb)	331 cm (130 in)	316 cm (124 in)	(Brazil) Sada Cruzeiro Vôlei
12	Douglas Souza	20 August 1995	1.99 m (6 ft 6 in)	75 kg (165 lb)	338 cm (133 in)	317 cm (125 in)	(Brazil) Funvic Taubaté
13	Maurício Souza	29 September 1988	2.09 m (6 ft 10 in)	93 kg (205 lb)	344 cm (135 in)	323 cm (127 in)	(Brazil) SESC-RJ
14	Matheus Santos	23 April 1996	2.06 m (6 ft 9 in)	96 kg (212 lb)	328 cm (129 in)	309 cm (122 in)	(Brazil) Minas Tênis Clube
15	Carlos Eduardo Silva	8 August 1994	2 m (6 ft 7 in)	90 kg (200 lb)	348 cm (137 in)	340 cm (130 in)	(Italy) Vibo Valentia
16	Lucas Saatkamp	6 March 1986	2.09 m (6 ft 10 in)	101 kg (223 lb)	340 cm (130 in)	321 cm (126 in)	(Brazil) Funvic Taubaté
17	Thales Hoss	26 April 1989	1.9 m (6 ft 3 in)	74 kg (163 lb)	320 cm (130 in)	303 cm (119 in)	(Brazil) Funvic Taubaté
18	Ricardo Lucarelli Souza	14 February 1992	1.96 m (6 ft 5 in)	87 kg (192 lb)	348 cm (137 in)	326 cm (128 in)	(Brazil) Funvic Taubaté
20	Thiago Veloso	15 August 1993	1.84 m (6 ft 0 in)	77 kg (170 lb)	305 cm (120 in)	298 cm (117 in)	(Brazil) SESC-RJ
21	Alan Souza	21 March 1994	2.02 m (6 ft 8 in)	98 kg (216 lb)	336 cm (132 in)	320 cm (130 in)	(Brazil) SESI-SP
22	Maique Nascimento	16 July 1997	1.82 m (6 ft 0 in)	76 kg (168 lb)	310 cm (120 in)	255 cm (100 in)	(Brazil) Minas Tênis Clube
23	Flávio Gualberto	22 April 1993	1.99 m (6 ft 6 in)	84 kg (185 lb)	356 cm (140 in)	329 cm (130 in)	(Brazil) Minas Tênis Clube
24	Douglas Pureza	16 November 1996	1.78 m (5 ft 10 in)	70 kg (150 lb)	302 cm (119 in)	273 cm (107 in)	(Brazil) SESI-SP
25	Evandro Guerra	27 December 1981	2.07 m (6 ft 9 in)	106 kg (234 lb)	359 cm (141 in)	332 cm (131 in)	(Brazil) Sada Cruzeiro Vôlei
29	Rafael Araujo	13 June 1991	2.06 m (6 ft 9 in)	93 kg (205 lb)	348 cm (137 in)	325 cm (128 in)	(Poland) MKS Bedzin

=== Bulgaria ===
The following is the Bulgarian roster in the 2019 Intercontinental Olympic Qualification Tournament.

Head Coach: Silvano Prandi

No.	Name	Date of birth	Height	Weight	Spike	Block	2019 club
1	Iliya Petkov	10 October 1996	2.01 m (6 ft 7 in)	88 kg (194 lb)	350 cm (140 in)	337 cm (133 in)	(Bulgaria) Neftochimik
2	Krasimir Georgiev	13 February 1995	2.05 m (6 ft 9 in)	95 kg (209 lb)	346 cm (136 in)	333 cm (131 in)	(France) Rennes Volley 35
3	Dobromir Dimitrov	7 July 1991	1.98 m (6 ft 6 in)	84 kg (185 lb)	345 cm (136 in)	335 cm (132 in)	(Italy) Pag Volley Taviano
4	Martin Atanasov	27 September 1996	1.98 m (6 ft 6 in)	80 kg (180 lb)	350 cm (140 in)	330 cm (130 in)	(France) Chaumont Volleyball 52
5	Svetoslav Gotsev	31 August 1990	2.05 m (6 ft 9 in)	97 kg (214 lb)	358 cm (141 in)	335 cm (132 in)	(Russia) Dinamo Leningrad
6	Rozalin Penchev	11 December 1994	1.97 m (6 ft 6 in)	79 kg (174 lb)	337 cm (133 in)	327 cm (129 in)	(Bulgaria) SESK
7	Chono Penchev	11 December 1994	1.97 m (6 ft 6 in)	78 kg (172 lb)	318 cm (125 in)	307 cm (121 in)	(Bulgaria) Pirin Razlog
8	Todor Skrimov	9 January 1990	1.91 m (6 ft 3 in)	87 kg (192 lb)	348 cm (137 in)	330 cm (130 in)	(Italy) Vibo Valentia
9	Georgi Seganov	10 June 1993	1.98 m (6 ft 6 in)	83 kg (183 lb)	335 cm (132 in)	325 cm (128 in)	(Turkey) Maliye Milli Pyango
10	Asparuh Asparuhov	28 July 2000	2.01 m (6 ft 7 in)	73 kg (161 lb)	350 cm (140 in)	330 cm (130 in)	(Bulgaria) VK Montana
11	Velizar Chernokozhev	23 April 1995	2.12 m (6 ft 11 in)	108 kg (238 lb)	350 cm (140 in)	335 cm (132 in)	(Bulgaria) Diobrudzha 07
12	Viktor Yosifov (C)	16 October 1985	2.04 m (6 ft 8 in)	100 kg (220 lb)	350 cm (140 in)	340 cm (130 in)	(Italy) Monza
13	Teodor Salparov	16 August 1982	1.87 m (6 ft 2 in)	77 kg (170 lb)	320 cm (130 in)	305 cm (120 in)	(Bulgaria) Neftochimik
14	Teodor Todorov	1 September 1989	2.08 m (6 ft 10 in)	108 kg (238 lb)	365 cm (144 in)	345 cm (136 in)	(Bulgaria) Neftochimik
15	Venelin Kadankov	31 August 1987	2 m (6 ft 7 in)	100 kg (220 lb)	335 cm (132 in)	315 cm (124 in)	(Bulgaria) Afyonkarahisar Genclik
16	Georgi Petrov	18 August 1999	1.97 m (6 ft 6 in)	77 kg (170 lb)	340 cm (130 in)	330 cm (130 in)	(Bulgaria) Neftochimik
17	Nikolay Penchev	22 May 1992	1.97 m (6 ft 6 in)	87 kg (192 lb)	341 cm (134 in)	335 cm (132 in)	(Poland) Onico Warszawa
18	Plamen Shekerdzhiev	21 May 1998	1.98 m (6 ft 6 in)	83 kg (183 lb)	345 cm (136 in)	328 cm (129 in)	(Bulgaria) CSKA Sofia
19	Tsvetan Sokolov	31 December 1989	2.06 m (6 ft 9 in)	100 kg (220 lb)	370 cm (150 in)	350 cm (140 in)	(Italy) Cucine Lube Civitanova
20	Aleks Grozdanov	28 March 1998	2.06 m (6 ft 9 in)	86 kg (190 lb)	355 cm (140 in)	334 cm (131 in)	(Belgium) Maaseik Volley
21	Petar Karakashev	11 February 1991	1.84 m (6 ft 0 in)	74 kg (163 lb)	326 cm (128 in)	308 cm (121 in)	(Bulgaria) VC Hebar
22	Vladimir Stankov	9 August 1996	1.86 m (6 ft 1 in)	80 kg (180 lb)	325 cm (128 in)	320 cm (130 in)	(Bulgaria) CSKA Sofia
23	Martin Ivanov	4 February 1992	1.9 m (6 ft 3 in)	78 kg (172 lb)	320 cm (130 in)	310 cm (120 in)	(Bulgaria) Neftochimik

=== Egypt ===
The following is the Egyptian roster in the 2019 Intercontinental Olympic Qualification Tournament.

Head Coach: Gido Vermeulen

No.	Name	Date of birth	Height	Weight	Spike	Block	2019 club
1	Ahmed Mohamed	1 March 1989	1.93 m (6 ft 4 in)	83 kg (183 lb)	335 cm (132 in)	330 cm (130 in)	(Egypt) Al Ahly SC
2	Abdallah Abdalsalam Abdallah Bekhit	10 October 1983	2.02 m (6 ft 8 in)	85 kg (187 lb)	346 cm (136 in)	330 cm (130 in)	(Egypt) Al Ahly SC
3	Mohamed Badawy	11 January 1986	1.97 m (6 ft 6 in)	97 kg (214 lb)	351 cm (138 in)	343 cm (135 in)	(Egypt) Al Ahly SC
4	Ahmed Abdelhay (C)	19 August 1984	1.97 m (6 ft 6 in)	87 kg (192 lb)	342 cm (135 in)	316 cm (124 in)	(Egypt) Al Ahly SC
5	Abdelrahman Seoudy	21 August 1997	2.07 m (6 ft 9 in)	100 kg (220 lb)	350 cm (140 in)	337 cm (133 in)	(Egypt) Al Ahly SC
6	Mohamed Hassan	28 September 1993	1.93 m (6 ft 4 in)	76 kg (168 lb)	319 cm (126 in)	302 cm (119 in)	(Egypt) Zamalek SC
7	Hisham Ewais	26 February 1995	1.96 m (6 ft 5 in)	75 kg (165 lb)	346 cm (136 in)	322 cm (127 in)	(Egypt) Smouha SC
8	Eslam Elsayed	9 February 1994	1.98 m (6 ft 6 in)	88 kg (194 lb)	305 cm (120 in)	281 cm (111 in)	(Egypt) Tala'ea El Gaish SC
9	Rashad Atia	2 September 1986	2.01 m (6 ft 7 in)	91 kg (201 lb)	348 cm (137 in)	342 cm (135 in)	(Egypt) Tala'ea El Gaish SC
10	Mohamed Masoud	1 May 1994	2.11 m (6 ft 11 in)	105 kg (231 lb)	358 cm (141 in)	342 cm (135 in)	(Egypt) Al Ahly SC
11	Ahmed Afifi	30 March 1988	1.94 m (6 ft 4 in)	92 kg (203 lb)	347 cm (137 in)	342 cm (135 in)	(Egypt) Zamalek SC
12	Hossam Abdalla	16 February 1988	2.03 m (6 ft 8 in)	97 kg (214 lb)	345 cm (136 in)	338 cm (133 in)	(Egypt) Al Ahly SC
13	Mohamed Khater	4 July 1991	2 m (6 ft 7 in)	85 kg (187 lb)	334 cm (131 in)	328 cm (129 in)	(Egypt) Tayran
14	Omar Hassan	4 April 1991	1.91 m (6 ft 3 in)	104 kg (229 lb)	333 cm (131 in)	324 cm (128 in)	(Egypt) Tala'ea El Gaish SC
15	Ahmed Elkotb	23 July 1991	1.97 m (6 ft 6 in)	80 kg (180 lb)	328 cm (129 in)	318 cm (125 in)	(Egypt) Al Ahly SC
16	Mohamed Abdelmohsen Seliman	4 January 1995	2.08 m (6 ft 10 in)	90 kg (200 lb)	336 cm (132 in)	322 cm (127 in)	(Egypt) Zamalek SC
17	Ahmed El Sayed	14 January 1991	1.84 m (6 ft 0 in)	84 kg (185 lb)	325 cm (128 in)	312 cm (123 in)	(Egypt) Tala'ea El Gaish SC
18	Ahmed Shafik	7 December 1994	1.9 m (6 ft 3 in)	89 kg (196 lb)	358 cm (141 in)	341 cm (134 in)	(Egypt) Al Ahly SC
19	Mostafa Mohamed Ibrahim Abdelrahman	25 January 1994	1.97 m (6 ft 6 in)	94 kg (207 lb)	353 cm (139 in)	337 cm (133 in)	(Egypt) Zamalek SC
20	Ahmed Saber Mohamed	12 December 1995	1.98 m (6 ft 6 in)	88 kg (194 lb)	305 cm (120 in)	281 cm (111 in)	(Egypt) Aviation Club
21	Abdelrahman Abouelella	15 September 1996	2.09 m (6 ft 10 in)	109 kg (240 lb)	334 cm (131 in)	320 cm (130 in)	(Egypt) Aviation Club
22	Ahmed Abdelaal	8 June 1989	1.88 m (6 ft 2 in)	84 kg (185 lb)	325 cm (128 in)	312 cm (123 in)	(Egypt) Tala'ea El Gaish SC
23	Ahmed Omar	4 March 1995	1.96 m (6 ft 5 in)	93 kg (205 lb)	326 cm (128 in)	315 cm (124 in)	(Egypt) Zamalek SC
24	Mahmoud Mohamed	7 April 1986	1.97 m (6 ft 6 in)	93 kg (205 lb)	350 cm (140 in)	335 cm (132 in)	(Egypt) Smouha SC
25	Ahmed Bekhet	15 October 1995	1.91 m (6 ft 3 in)	80 kg (180 lb)	320 cm (130 in)	301 cm (119 in)	(Egypt) Gezira Sporting Club

=== Puerto Rico ===
The following is the Puerto Rican roster in the 2019 Intercontinental Olympic Qualification Tournament.

Head coach: Oswald Antonetti

No.	Name	Date of birth	Height	Weight	Spike	Block	2019
1	Steven Morales	7 April 1992	1.95 m (6 ft 5 in)	82 kg (181 lb)	346 cm (136 in)	317 cm (125 in)	(Puerto Rico) Caribes de San Sebastian
3	Pablo Guzmán	2 June 1987	1.88 m (6 ft 2 in)	67 kg (148 lb)	292 cm (115 in)	288 cm (113 in)	(Puerto Rico) Guaynabo
4	Dennis Del Valle	27 January 1989	1.75 m (5 ft 9 in)	58 kg (128 lb)	300 cm (120 in)	290 cm (110 in)	(Puerto Rico) Guaynabo
5	Pedro Nieves	29 June 1993	1.98 m (6 ft 6 in)	92 kg (203 lb)	312 cm (123 in)	305 cm (120 in)	(Puerto Rico) National Team
6	Luis García	5 January 1995	1.87 m (6 ft 2 in)	81 kg (179 lb)	320 cm (130 in)	311 cm (122 in)	(Puerto Rico) National Team
7	Arturo Iglesias	22 November 1995	1.97 m (6 ft 6 in)	88 kg (194 lb)	246 cm (97 in)	243 cm (96 in)	(Puerto Rico) National Team
8	Eddie Rivera	16 June 1992	1.81 m (5 ft 11 in)	69 kg (152 lb)	248 cm (98 in)	242 cm (95 in)	(Puerto Rico) Guaynabo
9	Pedro Molina	7 April 1999	1.92 m (6 ft 4 in)	81 kg (179 lb)	246 cm (97 in)	239 cm (94 in)	(Puerto Rico) National Team
10	Ezequiel Cruz Lozada	15 July 1986	1.91 m (6 ft 3 in)	85 kg (187 lb)	333 cm (131 in)	326 cm (128 in)	(Puerto Rico) Arecibo
11	Maurice Torres (C)	6 July 1991	2.01 m (6 ft 7 in)	100 kg (220 lb)	305 cm (120 in)	299 cm (118 in)	(Puerto Rico) Arecibo
12	Kevin López	24 April 1995	1.98 m (6 ft 6 in)	81 kg (179 lb)	245 cm (96 in)	238 cm (94 in)	(Puerto Rico) National Team
13	Sequiel Sánchez	24 March 1990	1.91 m (6 ft 3 in)	89 kg (196 lb)	325 cm (128 in)	305 cm (120 in)	(Puerto Rico) Naranjito
14	Pelegrin Vargas	31 July 1998	1.93 m (6 ft 4 in)	87 kg (192 lb)	242 cm (95 in)	236 cm (93 in)	(Puerto Rico) National Team
15	Jonathan Rodríguez	16 September 1997	1.93 m (6 ft 4 in)	82 kg (181 lb)	243 cm (96 in)	238 cm (94 in)	(Puerto Rico) National Team
16	Antonio Elias Rodríguez	15 September 2000	1.93 m (6 ft 4 in)	81 kg (179 lb)	256 cm (101 in)	252 cm (99 in)	(Puerto Rico) National Team
17	Jessie Colón	20 September 1984	1.92 m (6 ft 4 in)	74 kg (163 lb)	257 cm (101 in)	252 cm (99 in)	(Puerto Rico) Mayaguez
18	Pedro Rosario	18 May 1994	1.89 m (6 ft 2 in)	78 kg (172 lb)	244 cm (96 in)	238 cm (94 in)	(Puerto Rico) National Team
19	Oscar Fiorentino Páez	5 February 1997	1.89 m (6 ft 2 in)	82 kg (181 lb)	245 cm (96 in)	239 cm (94 in)	(Puerto Rico) National Team
22	Gabriel García	8 January 1999	1.98 m (6 ft 6 in)	92 kg (203 lb)	242 cm (95 in)	237 cm (93 in)	(Puerto Rico) National Team
24	Arnel Cabrera	11 October 1994	1.89 m (6 ft 2 in)	79 kg (174 lb)	245 cm (96 in)	239 cm (94 in)	(Puerto Rico) Guaynabo
25	Brian Negron	15 February 1996	1.99 m (6 ft 6 in)	88 kg (194 lb)	302 cm (119 in)	297 cm (117 in)	(Puerto Rico) National Team

== Pool B ==
=== Belgium ===
The following is the Belgian roster in the 2019 Intercontinental Olympic Qualification Tournament.

Head coach: Brecht Van Kerckhove

No.	Name	Date of birth	Height	Weight	Spike	Block	2019
1	Bram Van Den Dries	14 August 1989	2.08 m (6 ft 10 in)	99 kg (218 lb)	361 cm (142 in)	325 cm (128 in)	(France) Rennes Volley 35
2	Hendrik Tuerlinckx	1 December 1987	1.95 m (6 ft 5 in)	86 kg (190 lb)	355 cm (140 in)	321 cm (126 in)	(Belgium) Knack Roeselare
3	Sam Deroo (C)	29 April 1992	2.03 m (6 ft 8 in)	103 kg (227 lb)	362 cm (143 in)	335 cm (132 in)	(Poland) Kedzierzyn
4	Stijn D'hulst	24 April 1991	1.87 m (6 ft 2 in)	75 kg (165 lb)	321 cm (126 in)	305 cm (120 in)	(Italy) Cucine Lube Civitanova
5	Igor Oskar Grobelny	8 June 1993	1.94 m (6 ft 4 in)	85 kg (187 lb)	350 cm (140 in)	330 cm (130 in)	(Poland) Lubin
6	Lowie Stuer	24 November 1995	1.94 m (6 ft 4 in)	80 kg (180 lb)	331 cm (130 in)	310 cm (120 in)	(Belgium) Parky Menen
7	Francois Lecat	19 April 1993	2 m (6 ft 7 in)	96 kg (212 lb)	347 cm (137 in)	320 cm (130 in)	(France) Narbonne Volley
8	Arno Van De Velde	30 December 1995	2.1 m (6 ft 11 in)	93 kg (205 lb)	350 cm (140 in)	340 cm (130 in)	(Belgium) Knack Roeselare
9	Pieter Verhees	8 December 1989	2.05 m (6 ft 9 in)	112 kg (247 lb)	360 cm (140 in)	349 cm (137 in)	(Italy) Ravenna
10	Simon Van De Voorde	19 December 1989	2.08 m (6 ft 10 in)	100 kg (220 lb)	365 cm (144 in)	350 cm (140 in)	(Belgium) Lindemans Aalst
11	Jolan Cox	12 July 1991	1.94 m (6 ft 4 in)	72 kg (159 lb)	342 cm (135 in)	315 cm (124 in)	(Belgium) Greenyard Maaseik
12	Matthijs Verhanneman	8 December 1988	1.98 m (6 ft 6 in)	98 kg (216 lb)	350 cm (140 in)	340 cm (130 in)	(Belgium) Knack Roeselare
13	Simon Peeters	28 April 1997	1.92 m (6 ft 4 in)	80 kg (180 lb)	340 cm (130 in)	305 cm (120 in)	(Belgium) Greenyard Maaseik
14	Jelle Ribbens	17 March 1992	1.85 m (6 ft 1 in)	79 kg (174 lb)	331 cm (130 in)	300 cm (120 in)	(France) Nice
15	Lienert Cosemans	20 October 1993	2.03 m (6 ft 8 in)	93 kg (205 lb)	340 cm (130 in)	315 cm (124 in)	(Belgium) VBC Waremme
16	Matthias Valkiers	8 April 1990	1.94 m (6 ft 4 in)	92 kg (203 lb)	339 cm (133 in)	310 cm (120 in)	(France) Tourcoing
17	Tomas Rousseaux	31 March 1994	1.99 m (6 ft 6 in)	90 kg (200 lb)	352 cm (139 in)	317 cm (125 in)	(Belgium) Olsztyn
18	Seppe Baetens	13 February 1989	1.91 m (6 ft 3 in)	92 kg (203 lb)	345 cm (136 in)	312 cm (123 in)	(Belgium) Greenyard Maaseik
19	Wannes De Beul	10 June 1991	1.95 m (6 ft 5 in)	95 kg (209 lb)	332 cm (131 in)	315 cm (124 in)	(Belgium) Par-ky Menen
20	Tim Verstraete	1 February 1999	1.74 m (5 ft 9 in)	72 kg (159 lb)	317 cm (125 in)	293 cm (115 in)	(Belgium) Volley Haasrode Leuven
21	Lou Kindt	25 May 1997	2.02 m (6 ft 8 in)	85 kg (187 lb)	345 cm (136 in)	322 cm (127 in)	(Belgium) Knack Roeselare
22	Pieter Coolman	24 April 1989	2 m (6 ft 7 in)	90 kg (200 lb)	351 cm (138 in)	321 cm (126 in)	(Belgium) Knack Roeselare
23	Seppe Van Hoyweghen	7 October 2000	1.96 m (6 ft 5 in)	81 kg (179 lb)	339 cm (133 in)	303 cm (119 in)	(Belgium) Lindemans Aalst
24	Kevin Klinkenberg	4 October 1990	1.97 m (6 ft 6 in)	94 kg (207 lb)	343 cm (135 in)	314 cm (124 in)	(Turkey) Fenerbahce
25	Wout D'heer	26 April 2001	2.02 m (6 ft 8 in)	80 kg (180 lb)	345 cm (136 in)	320 cm (130 in)	(Belgium) Topsportschool Vilvoord

=== Netherlands ===
The following is the Dutch roster in the 2019 Intercontinental Olympic Qualification Tournament.

Head coach: Roberto Piazza

No.	Name	Date of birth	Height	Weight	Spike	Block	2019
1	Daan Van Haarlem	15 March 1989	1.98 m (6 ft 6 in)	92 kg (203 lb)	332 cm (131 in)	323 cm (127 in)	(Bulgaria) Levski Sofia
2	Wessel Keemink	29 May 1993	1.97 m (6 ft 6 in)	81 kg (179 lb)	345 cm (136 in)	337 cm (133 in)	(Belgium) Lindemans Aalst
3	Maarten Van Garderen	24 January 1990	2 m (6 ft 7 in)	89 kg (196 lb)	359 cm (141 in)	338 cm (133 in)	(Italy) Trentino Volley
4	Thijs Ter Horst	18 September 1991	2.04 m (6 ft 8 in)	97 kg (214 lb)	364 cm (143 in)	344 cm (135 in)	(South Korea) Daejeon Samsung Bluefangs
5	Luuc Van Der Ent	27 July 1998	2.08 m (6 ft 10 in)	105 kg (231 lb)	359 cm (141 in)	351 cm (138 in)	(Italy) Modena
6	Just Dronkers	7 June 1993	1.87 m (6 ft 2 in)	82 kg (181 lb)	330 cm (130 in)	308 cm (121 in)	(Belgium) Noliko Maaseik
7	Gijs Jorna	30 May 1989	1.96 m (6 ft 5 in)	85 kg (187 lb)	340 cm (130 in)	310 cm (120 in)	(France) Toulouse (Volleyball)
8	Fabian Plak	23 July 1997	1.98 m (6 ft 6 in)	92 kg (203 lb)	357 cm (141 in)	341 cm (134 in)	(Italy) VBC Mondovi
9	Ewoud Gommans	17 November 1990	2.02 m (6 ft 8 in)	93 kg (205 lb)	340 cm (130 in)	320 cm (130 in)	(France) Amneville
10	Sjoerd Hoogendoorn	17 February 1991	1.98 m (6 ft 6 in)	85 kg (187 lb)	354 cm (139 in)	332 cm (131 in)	(Italy) Perugia
11	Daan Streutker	21 July 1999	2.03 m (6 ft 8 in)	94 kg (207 lb)	342 cm (135 in)	332 cm (131 in)	(Netherlands) Talentteam Papendal
12	Tim Smit	31 December 1989	2.01 m (6 ft 7 in)	92 kg (203 lb)	343 cm (135 in)	332 cm (131 in)	(France) Tourcoing Volley
13	Niels De Vries	4 July 1996	2.05 m (6 ft 9 in)	96 kg (212 lb)	360 cm (140 in)	345 cm (136 in)	(Netherlands) Abiant Lycurgus
14	Nimir Abdel-Aziz (C)	5 February 1992	2.01 m (6 ft 7 in)	91 kg (201 lb)	365 cm (144 in)	350 cm (140 in)	(Italy) Power Volley Milano
15	Gijs Van Solkema	21 May 1998	1.93 m (6 ft 4 in)	91 kg (201 lb)	0 cm (0 in)	0 cm (0 in)	(Germany) SVG Lüneburg
16	Wouter Ter Maat	7 May 1991	2 m (6 ft 7 in)	93 kg (205 lb)	351 cm (138 in)	338 cm (133 in)	(Turkey) Fenerbahce
17	Michael Parkinson	23 November 1991	2.03 m (6 ft 8 in)	102 kg (225 lb)	365 cm (144 in)	350 cm (140 in)	(France) Nantes
18	Robbert Andringa	28 April 1990	1.92 m (6 ft 4 in)	85 kg (187 lb)	330 cm (130 in)	310 cm (120 in)	(Poland) Indykpol AZS Olsztyn
19	Freek De Weijer	30 October 1995	0.82 m (2 ft 8 in)	196 kg (432 lb)	359 cm (141 in)	351 cm (138 in)	(Russia) Dynamo
20	Stijn Held	3 November 1994	1.96 m (6 ft 5 in)	82 kg (181 lb)	331 cm (130 in)	321 cm (126 in)	(Netherlands) Lycurgus
21	Stijn Van Schie	19 February 1995	2.03 m (6 ft 8 in)	96 kg (212 lb)	350 cm (140 in)	337 cm (133 in)	(Belgium) VDK Gent
22	Twan Wiltenburg	20 January 1997	2.04 m (6 ft 8 in)	86 kg (190 lb)	334 cm (131 in)	325 cm (128 in)	(Netherlands) Orion Doetinchem
23	Luuk Hofhuis	28 September 2001	2.02 m (6 ft 8 in)	94 kg (207 lb)	328 cm (129 in)	319 cm (126 in)	(Netherlands) Talentteam Papendal
24	Rik Van Solkema	11 June 1999	1.97 m (6 ft 6 in)	82 kg (181 lb)	348 cm (137 in)	325 cm (128 in)	(Russia) Dynamo
25	Stijn Van Tilburg	7 April 1996	2.01 m (6 ft 7 in)	94 kg (207 lb)	345 cm (136 in)	325 cm (128 in)	(United States) University of Hawaii (USA)

=== South Korea ===
The following is the South Korean roster in the 2019 Intercontinental Olympic Qualification Tournament.

Head coach: Im Do-heon

No.	Name	Date of birth	Height	Weight	Spike	Block	2019
1	Hwang Taek-eui	12 November 1996	1.89 m (6 ft 2 in)	79 kg (174 lb)	305 cm (120 in)	300 cm (120 in)	(South Korea) KB Insurance
2	Han Sun-soo	16 December 1985	1.89 m (6 ft 2 in)	80 kg (180 lb)	310 cm (120 in)	297 cm (117 in)	(South Korea) Korean Airlines
3	Na Gyeong-bok	8 April 1994	1.95 m (6 ft 5 in)	78 kg (172 lb)	320 cm (130 in)	315 cm (124 in)	(South Korea) Woori Card
4	Jeong Min-su	5 October 1991	1.78 m (5 ft 10 in)	75 kg (165 lb)	300 cm (120 in)	290 cm (110 in)	(South Korea) KB Insurance
5	Lee Sang-uk	8 July 1995	1.83 m (6 ft 0 in)	73 kg (161 lb)	290 cm (110 in)	285 cm (112 in)	(South Korea) Woori Card
6	Jin Sang-heon	22 April 1986	1.98 m (6 ft 6 in)	86 kg (190 lb)	320 cm (130 in)	310 cm (120 in)	(South Korea) Korean Airlines
7	Heo Su-bong	7 April 1998	1.97 m (6 ft 6 in)	75 kg (165 lb)	320 cm (130 in)	310 cm (120 in)	(South Korea) Sangmu
8	Song Myung-geun	12 March 1993	1.96 m (6 ft 5 in)	85 kg (187 lb)	325 cm (128 in)	315 cm (124 in)	(South Korea) OK Savings Bank
9	Kwak Seung-suk	23 March 1988	1.9 m (6 ft 3 in)	81 kg (179 lb)	325 cm (128 in)	320 cm (130 in)	(South Korea) Korean Airlines
10	Jung Ji-seok	10 March 1995	1.94 m (6 ft 4 in)	87 kg (192 lb)	310 cm (120 in)	300 cm (120 in)	(South Korea) Korean Airlines
11	Choi Min-ho	28 April 1988	1.98 m (6 ft 6 in)	86 kg (190 lb)	330 cm (130 in)	312 cm (123 in)	(South Korea) Hyundai Capital
12	Ji Tae-hwan	5 June 1986	2 m (6 ft 7 in)	89 kg (196 lb)	330 cm (130 in)	315 cm (124 in)	(South Korea) Samsung Fire&Marine Insurance
13	Park Chul-woo	25 July 1985	1.98 m (6 ft 6 in)	88 kg (194 lb)	332 cm (131 in)	319 cm (126 in)	(South Korea) Samsung Fire&Marine Insurance
14	Jo Jae-sung	1 August 1995	1.93 m (6 ft 4 in)	79 kg (174 lb)	300 cm (120 in)	285 cm (112 in)	(South Korea) OK Savings Bank
15	Moon Sung-min	14 September 1986	1.98 m (6 ft 6 in)	89 kg (196 lb)	329 cm (130 in)	321 cm (126 in)	(South Korea) Hyundai Capital
16	No Jae-wook	10 July 1992	1.91 m (6 ft 3 in)	86 kg (190 lb)	310 cm (120 in)	300 cm (120 in)	(South Korea) Woori Card
17	Kwak Myoung-woo	8 April 1991	1.93 m (6 ft 4 in)	83 kg (183 lb)	310 cm (120 in)	300 cm (120 in)	(South Korea) OK Savings Bank
18	Shin Yung-suk (C)	4 October 1986	1.98 m (6 ft 6 in)	90 kg (200 lb)	335 cm (132 in)	325 cm (128 in)	(South Korea) Hyundai Capital
19	Kim Jae-hwi	6 September 1993	2.04 m (6 ft 8 in)	85 kg (187 lb)	330 cm (130 in)	320 cm (130 in)	(South Korea) Sangmu
20	Jeong Seong-hyeon	18 May 1991	1.8 m (5 ft 11 in)	69 kg (152 lb)	290 cm (110 in)	280 cm (110 in)	(South Korea) Sangmu
21	Kim Kyu-min	28 December 1990	1.99 m (6 ft 6 in)	92 kg (203 lb)	320 cm (130 in)	310 cm (120 in)	(South Korea) Korean Airlines
22	Im Dong-hyeok	9 March 1999	1.99 m (6 ft 6 in)	86 kg (190 lb)	320 cm (130 in)	300 cm (120 in)	(South Korea) Korean Airlines
23	Lee Seung-won	11 April 1993	1.87 m (6 ft 2 in)	78 kg (172 lb)	310 cm (120 in)	297 cm (117 in)	(South Korea) Hyundai Capital
24	Han Sung-jeong	25 July 1996	1.95 m (6 ft 5 in)	82 kg (181 lb)	300 cm (120 in)	290 cm (110 in)	(South Korea) Woori Card
25	Lee Tae-ho	16 August 2000	2.03 m (6 ft 8 in)	84 kg (185 lb)	330 cm (130 in)	320 cm (130 in)	(South Korea) KEPCO

=== United States ===
The following is the American roster in the 2019 Intercontinental Olympic Qualification Tournament.

Head Coach: John Speraw

No.	Name	Date of birth	Height	Weight	Spike	Block	2019 club
1	Matthew Anderson	18 April 1987	2.02 m (6 ft 8 in)	100 kg (220 lb)	360 cm (140 in)	332 cm (131 in)	(Russia) Zenit Kazan
2	Aaron Russell	4 June 1993	2.05 m (6 ft 9 in)	98 kg (216 lb)	356 cm (140 in)	337 cm (133 in)	(Italy) Trentino Volley
3	Taylor Sander (C)	17 March 1992	1.96 m (6 ft 5 in)	80 kg (180 lb)	345 cm (136 in)	320 cm (130 in)	(Brazil) Associacao Social Esportiva
4	Jeffrey Jendryk	15 September 1995	2.08 m (6 ft 10 in)	89 kg (196 lb)	353 cm (139 in)	345 cm (136 in)	(Germany) SCC Berlin
5	Kyle Ensing	6 March 1997	2.01 m (6 ft 7 in)	100 kg (220 lb)	366 cm (144 in)	353 cm (139 in)	(United States) Long Beach State University
6	Mitchell Stahl	31 August 1994	2.03 m (6 ft 8 in)	84 kg (185 lb)	350 cm (140 in)	325 cm (128 in)	(France) Tours Volley-Ball
7	Kawika Shoji	11 November 1987	1.9 m (6 ft 3 in)	79 kg (174 lb)	331 cm (130 in)	315 cm (124 in)	(Poland) Asseco Resovia Rzeszów
8	Torey Defalco	10 April 1997	1.98 m (6 ft 6 in)	95 kg (209 lb)	340 cm (130 in)	328 cm (129 in)	(United States) Long Beach State University
9	Jake Langlois	14 May 1992	2.08 m (6 ft 10 in)	93 kg (205 lb)	365 cm (144 in)	355 cm (140 in)	(Poland) Miejski Klub Sportowy Bedzin
11	Micah Christenson	8 May 1993	1.98 m (6 ft 6 in)	88 kg (194 lb)	349 cm (137 in)	340 cm (130 in)	(Italy) Modena Volley Punto Zero
12	Maxwell Holt	12 March 1987	2.05 m (6 ft 9 in)	90 kg (200 lb)	351 cm (138 in)	333 cm (131 in)	(Italy) Modena Volley Punto Zero
13	Benjamin Patch	21 June 1994	2.03 m (6 ft 8 in)	90 kg (200 lb)	368 cm (145 in)	348 cm (137 in)	(Germany) SCC Berlin
14	Micah Maʻa	16 April 1997	1.92 m (6 ft 4 in)	88 kg (194 lb)	333 cm (131 in)	318 cm (125 in)	(United States) UCLA
15	Brenden Sander	22 December 1995	1.93 m (6 ft 4 in)	78 kg (172 lb)	358 cm (141 in)	337 cm (133 in)	(Italy) A.S. Volley Lube
16	Joshua Tuaniga	18 March 1997	1.91 m (6 ft 3 in)	102 kg (225 lb)	320 cm (130 in)	307 cm (121 in)	(United States) Long Beach State University
17	Thomas Jaeschke	4 September 1993	1.98 m (6 ft 6 in)	84 kg (185 lb)	348 cm (137 in)	330 cm (130 in)	(Italy) Bluvolley Verona
18	Garrett Muagututia	26 February 1988	2.05 m (6 ft 9 in)	92 kg (203 lb)	359 cm (141 in)	345 cm (136 in)	(Greece) PAOK Thessaloniki
20	David Smith	15 May 1985	2.01 m (6 ft 7 in)	86 kg (190 lb)	348 cm (137 in)	314 cm (124 in)	(Poland) Asseco Resovia Rzeszów
21	Dustin Watten	27 October 1986	1.82 m (6 ft 0 in)	80 kg (180 lb)	306 cm (120 in)	295 cm (116 in)	(Germany) SCC Berlin
22	Erik Shoji	24 August 1989	1.84 m (6 ft 0 in)	83 kg (183 lb)	330 cm (130 in)	321 cm (126 in)	(Russia) Fakel Novy Urengoy
23	Brendan Schmidt	3 September 1994	2.05 m (6 ft 9 in)	104 kg (229 lb)	358 cm (141 in)	332 cm (131 in)	(United States) USA Men's Volleyball Team
24	Kyle Dagostino	18 May 1995	1.75 m (5 ft 9 in)	75 kg (165 lb)	312 cm (123 in)	307 cm (121 in)	(United States) Stanford University
28	James Shaw	5 March 1994	2.03 m (6 ft 8 in)	98 kg (216 lb)	354 cm (139 in)	338 cm (133 in)	(Poland) Zaksa Kedzierzyn-Kozie
29	Price Jarman	21 November 1992	2.04 m (6 ft 8 in)	100 kg (220 lb)	350 cm (140 in)	331 cm (130 in)	(Brazil) Associacao Itapetininga de Vol
30	George Huhmann	17 October 1997	2.12 m (6 ft 11 in)	93 kg (205 lb)	358 cm (141 in)	345 cm (136 in)	(United States) Princeton University

== Pool C ==
=== Australia ===
The following is the Australian roster in the 2019 Intercontinental Olympic Qualification Tournament.

Head Coach: Mark Lebedew

No.	Name	Date of birth	Height	Weight	Spike	Block	2019 club
1	Beau Graham	17 April 1994	2.02 m (6 ft 8 in)	86 kg (190 lb)	351 cm (138 in)	8 cm (3.1 in)	(Czech Republic) VK Pribram
2	Arshdeep Dosanjh	30 July 1996	2.05 m (6 ft 9 in)	85 kg (187 lb)	347 cm (137 in)	8 cm (3.1 in)	(Poland) Aluron Warta Zawiercie
3	Steven Macdonald	26 June 1997	2.07 m (6 ft 9 in)	85 kg (187 lb)	351 cm (138 in)	0 cm (0 in)	(Netherlands) Orion Rotterdam
4	Paul Sanderson	7 January 1986	1.95 m (6 ft 5 in)	94 kg (207 lb)	348 cm (137 in)	8 cm (3.1 in)	(Romania) Arcadia Galati
5	Travis Passier	26 April 1989	2.08 m (6 ft 10 in)	100 kg (220 lb)	355 cm (140 in)	20 cm (7.9 in)	(Australia) VA Centre of Excellence
6	Thomas Edgar	21 June 1989	2.12 m (6 ft 11 in)	106 kg (234 lb)	357 cm (141 in)	12 cm (4.7 in)	(Japan) JT Thunders
7	Harrison Peacock	31 January 1991	1.92 m (6 ft 4 in)	87 kg (192 lb)	353 cm (139 in)	17 cm (6.7 in)	(Australia) VA Centre of Excellence
8	Trent O'dea	11 May 1994	2.01 m (6 ft 7 in)	98 kg (216 lb)	354 cm (139 in)	8 cm (3.1 in)	(Czech Republic) Karlovarsko
9	Max Staples	27 July 1994	1.94 m (6 ft 4 in)	83 kg (183 lb)	358 cm (141 in)	8 cm (3.1 in)	(Czech Republic) Ceske Budejovice
10	Jordan Richards	25 September 1993	1.93 m (6 ft 4 in)	80 kg (180 lb)	354 cm (139 in)	0 cm (0 in)	Sporting Clube de Portugal
11	Luke Perry	20 November 1995	1.8 m (5 ft 11 in)	75 kg (165 lb)	331 cm (130 in)	17 cm (6.7 in)	(Poland) Asseco Resovia Rzeszów
12	Nehemiah Mote	21 June 1993	2.04 m (6 ft 8 in)	91 kg (201 lb)	362 cm (143 in)	17 cm (6.7 in)	(Australia) VA Centre of Excellence
13	Samuel Walker	19 February 1995	2.08 m (6 ft 10 in)	90 kg (200 lb)	350 cm (140 in)	8 cm (3.1 in)	(Estonia) Bigbank Tartu
14	Benjamin Bell	24 February 1990	2 m (6 ft 7 in)	92 kg (203 lb)	345 cm (136 in)	0 cm (0 in)	(Denmark) Boldklubben Marienlyst
15	Luke Smith	30 August 1990	2.04 m (6 ft 8 in)	95 kg (209 lb)	360 cm (140 in)	17 cm (6.7 in)	(Poland) Cuprum Lubin
16	Shane Alexander	7 January 1986	2.02 m (6 ft 8 in)	95 kg (209 lb)	339 cm (133 in)	3 cm (1.2 in)	(Australia) Queensland Pirates
17	Paul Carroll (C)	16 May 1986	2.07 m (6 ft 9 in)	100 kg (220 lb)	354 cm (139 in)	25 cm (9.8 in)	(Russia) Yenisey Krasnoyarsk
18	Lincoln Alexander Williams	6 October 1993	2 m (6 ft 7 in)	104 kg (229 lb)	353 cm (139 in)	8 cm (3.1 in)	(Russia) Nizhnevartovsk
19	Malachi Murch	4 January 1995	1.97 m (6 ft 6 in)	75 kg (165 lb)	341 cm (134 in)	0 cm (0 in)	(Denmark) Nordenskov
21	Nicholas Butler	27 June 1997	1.98 m (6 ft 6 in)	95 kg (209 lb)	345 cm (136 in)	0 cm (0 in)	(France) Beauvais
22	Curtis Jeffrey Arthur Stockton	22 April 1993	1.98 m (6 ft 6 in)	94 kg (207 lb)	351 cm (138 in)	0 cm (0 in)	(France) Plessis Robinson
23	James Weir	20 July 1995	2.04 m (6 ft 8 in)	95 kg (209 lb)	348 cm (137 in)	0 cm (0 in)	(Canada) University of Brandon
24	Elliott Viles	1 May 1997	1.93 m (6 ft 4 in)	73 kg (161 lb)	360 cm (140 in)	0 cm (0 in)	(Canada) University of Brandon
25	Jordan Colotti	7 May 1996	1.88 m (6 ft 2 in)	82 kg (181 lb)	335 cm (132 in)	0 cm (0 in)	(Denmark) Nordenskov
26	Caleb Watson	28 June 1993	2 m (6 ft 7 in)	92 kg (203 lb)	344 cm (135 in)	0 cm (0 in)	(Sweden) Lund

=== Cameroon ===
The following is the Cameroonian roster in the 2019 Intercontinental Olympic Qualification Tournament.

Head Coach: Blaise Mayam Reniof

No.	Name	Date of birth	Height	Weight	Spike	Block	2019 club
1	Georges Kari Adeke	13 July 1981	1.91 m (6 ft 3 in)	88 kg (194 lb)	335 cm (132 in)	5 cm (2.0 in)	(France) MENDE VOLLEYBALL LOZERE
2	Ahmed Awal Mbutngam	23 April 1990	1.92 m (6 ft 4 in)	84 kg (185 lb)	340 cm (130 in)	0 cm (0 in)	(Cameroon) FAP VOLLEYBALL
3	Arnold Fabrice Koe Bassoko	8 October 2000	1.9 m (6 ft 3 in)	80 kg (180 lb)	300 cm (120 in)	0 cm (0 in)	(Cameroon) CAMEROON SPORTS VOLLEYBALL
4	Bana Hassana	3 April 1995	2.02 m (6 ft 8 in)	85 kg (187 lb)	345 cm (136 in)	0 cm (0 in)	(Cameroon) BAFIA VOLLEYBALL EVOLUTION
5	Joseph Herve Kofane Boyomo	14 September 1988	2.06 m (6 ft 9 in)	95 kg (209 lb)	360 cm (140 in)	0 cm (0 in)	(Cameroon) BAFIA VOLLEYBALL EVOLUTION
6	Sem Dolegombai	18 May 1990	2 m (6 ft 7 in)	95 kg (209 lb)	350 cm (140 in)	2 cm (0.79 in)	(France) AVIGNON
8	Junior Charles Engohe	22 April 1984	1.94 m (6 ft 4 in)	85 kg (187 lb)	355 cm (140 in)	0 cm (0 in)	(France) VENDEE VOLLEYBALL CLUB
9	Cedric Bitouna	13 September 2000	1.87 m (6 ft 2 in)	75 kg (165 lb)	310 cm (120 in)	0 cm (0 in)	(Cameroon) AJVM VOLLEYBALL
10	Didier Sali Hile	9 June 1991	1.92 m (6 ft 4 in)	80 kg (180 lb)	346 cm (136 in)	0 cm (0 in)	(Iraq) AL SHORTA VOLLEYBALL
11	Basile Dambe Todou	4 December 1992	1.89 m (6 ft 2 in)	80 kg (180 lb)	310 cm (120 in)	0 cm (0 in)	(Cameroon) BAFIA VOLLEYBALL EVOLUTION
12	Adam Brahim	20 May 2002	2 m (6 ft 7 in)	75 kg (165 lb)	330 cm (130 in)	0 cm (0 in)	(Cameroon) AJVM VOLLEYBALL
13	Cyrille Pierre Ongolo Mayam	27 September 1991	1.96 m (6 ft 5 in)	88 kg (194 lb)	345 cm (136 in)	0 cm (0 in)	(Algeria) Hasi Bounif
14	Nathan Wounembaina (C)	22 November 1984	1.98 m (6 ft 6 in)	83 kg (183 lb)	360 cm (140 in)	2 cm (0.79 in)	(France) TOURS VOLLEYBALL FRANCE
15	Yvan Arthur Kody Bitjaa	25 August 1991	2.13 m (7 ft 0 in)	92 kg (203 lb)	360 cm (140 in)	0 cm (0 in)	(Italy) WIXO LPR PIACENZA
16	Alain Fossi Kamto	4 November 1980	1.83 m (6 ft 0 in)	81 kg (179 lb)	333 cm (131 in)	2 cm (0.79 in)	(France) VBPN Niort
17	David Patrick Feughouo	5 May 1989	2.06 m (6 ft 9 in)	95 kg (209 lb)	355 cm (140 in)	2 cm (0.79 in)	(France) Nancy Volley Maxeville
18	Kevin Audran Noumbissi Moyo	22 May 1993	1.92 m (6 ft 4 in)	95 kg (209 lb)	348 cm (137 in)	0 cm (0 in)	(Cameroon) BAFIA VOLLEYBALL EVOLUTION
19	Walid Karim Fokou	19 March 2000	1.96 m (6 ft 5 in)	80 kg (180 lb)	345 cm (136 in)	0 cm (0 in)	(Qatar) QATAR SPORT CLUB
20	Christian Arthur Voukeng Mbativou	6 November 1992	2.05 m (6 ft 9 in)	90 kg (200 lb)	355 cm (140 in)	0 cm (0 in)	(Cameroon) CAMEROON SPORTS VB
22	Nelson Ayong Djam	2 June 1990	1.91 m (6 ft 3 in)	90 kg (200 lb)	290 cm (110 in)	0 cm (0 in)	(Cameroon) FAP VOLLEYBALL CM

=== Italy ===
The following is the Italian roster in the 2019 Intercontinental Olympic Qualification Tournament.

Head Coach: Gianlorenzo Blengini

No.	Name	Date of birth	Height	Weight	Spike	Block	2019 club
1	Davide Candellaro	7 June 1989	2 m (6 ft 7 in)	88 kg (194 lb)	340 cm (130 in)	10 cm (3.9 in)	(Italy) Trentino Volley
2	Riccardo Sbertoli	23 May 1998	1.88 m (6 ft 2 in)	85 kg (187 lb)	326 cm (128 in)	0 cm (0 in)	(Italy) Power Volley
3	Luca Spirito	30 October 1993	1.96 m (6 ft 5 in)	79 kg (174 lb)	338 cm (133 in)	0 cm (0 in)	(Italy) BluVolley Verona
4	Davide Gardini	11 February 1999	2.05 m (6 ft 9 in)	94 kg (207 lb)	330 cm (130 in)	0 cm (0 in)	(Italy) Volley Lube
5	Osmany Juantorena	12 August 1985	2 m (6 ft 7 in)	85 kg (187 lb)	370 cm (150 in)	0 cm (0 in)	(Italy) Cucine Lube Civitanova
6	Simone Giannelli	9 August 1996	1.98 m (6 ft 6 in)	92 kg (203 lb)	350 cm (140 in)	10 cm (3.9 in)	(Italy) Trentino Volley
7	Giacomo Raffaelli	7 February 1995	1.98 m (6 ft 6 in)	95 kg (209 lb)	338 cm (133 in)	0 cm (0 in)	(Italy) Porto Robur Costa
8	Daniele Mazzone	4 June 1992	2.08 m (6 ft 10 in)	88 kg (194 lb)	315 cm (124 in)	10 cm (3.9 in)	(Italy) Modena Volley
9	Ivan Zaytsev (C)	2 October 1988	2.04 m (6 ft 8 in)	100 kg (220 lb)	370 cm (150 in)	18 cm (7.1 in)	(Italy) Modena Volley
10	Filippo Lanza	3 March 1991	1.98 m (6 ft 6 in)	98 kg (216 lb)	350 cm (140 in)	13 cm (5.1 in)	(Italy) Sir Safety
11	Fabio Balaso	20 October 1995	1.78 m (5 ft 10 in)	73 kg (161 lb)	305 cm (120 in)	0 cm (0 in)	(Italy) Cucine Lube Civitanova
13	Massimo Colaci	21 February 1985	1.8 m (5 ft 11 in)	75 kg (165 lb)	314 cm (124 in)	10 cm (3.9 in)	(Italy) Sir Safety Perugia
14	Matteo Piano	24 October 1990	2.08 m (6 ft 10 in)	102 kg (225 lb)	352 cm (139 in)	11 cm (4.3 in)	(Italy) Power Volley
15	Roberto Russo	23 February 1997	2.07 m (6 ft 9 in)	91 kg (201 lb)	340 cm (130 in)	0 cm (0 in)	(Italy) Sir Safety Perugia
16	Oleg Antonov	28 July 1988	1.98 m (6 ft 6 in)	88 kg (194 lb)	340 cm (130 in)	0 cm (0 in)	(Turkey) Galatasaray
17	Simone Anzani	24 February 1992	2.04 m (6 ft 8 in)	100 kg (220 lb)	350 cm (140 in)	10 cm (3.9 in)	(Italy) Lube Civitanova
18	Nicola Pesaresi	11 February 1991	1.9 m (6 ft 3 in)	80 kg (180 lb)	315 cm (124 in)	0 cm (0 in)	(Italy) Power Volley
19	Daniele Lavia	4 November 1999	2 m (6 ft 7 in)	89 kg (196 lb)	345 cm (136 in)	0 cm (0 in)	(Italy) Porto Robur costa
20	Gabriele Nelli	4 December 1993	2.1 m (6 ft 11 in)	100 kg (220 lb)	355 cm (140 in)	10 cm (3.9 in)	(Italy) Neww Energy Piacenza
21	Alberto Polo	7 September 1995	2.03 m (6 ft 8 in)	87 kg (192 lb)	348 cm (137 in)	0 cm (0 in)	(Italy) Pallavolo Padova
22	Oreste Cavuto	5 December 1996	1.96 m (6 ft 5 in)	87 kg (192 lb)	353 cm (139 in)	0 cm (0 in)	(Italy) Robur Ravenna
24	Giulio Pinali	2 April 1997	1.99 m (6 ft 6 in)	91 kg (201 lb)	349 cm (137 in)	0 cm (0 in)	(Italy) Modena Volley
25	Alessandro Piccinelli	30 January 1997	1.89 m (6 ft 2 in)	98 kg (216 lb)	315 cm (124 in)	0 cm (0 in)	(Italy) Sir Safety Perugia
26	Luigi Ricci	16 February 1991	0 m (0 in)	0 kg (0 lb)	0 cm (0 in)	0 cm (0 in)	(Italy)
28	Francesco Recine	7 February 1999	1.86 m (6 ft 1 in)	75 kg (165 lb)	325 cm (128 in)	0 cm (0 in)	(Italy) Porto Robur Cost

=== Serbia ===
The following is the Serbian roster in the 2019 Intercontinental Olympic Qualification Tournament.

Head Coach: Nikola Grbić

No.	Name	Date of birth	Height	Weight	Spike	Block	2019 club
1	Aleksandar Okolic	26 June 1993	2.05 m (6 ft 9 in)	90 kg (200 lb)	347 cm (137 in)	13 cm (5.1 in)	(Greece) PAOK Thessaloniki
2	Uros Kovacevic	6 May 1993	1.97 m (6 ft 6 in)	90 kg (200 lb)	340 cm (130 in)	22 cm (8.7 in)	(Italy) Trentino Volley
3	Milan Katic	22 October 1993	2.02 m (6 ft 8 in)	99 kg (218 lb)	345 cm (136 in)	13 cm (5.1 in)	(Poland) PGE Skra Belchatow
4	Nemanja Petric (C)	28 July 1987	2.03 m (6 ft 8 in)	96 kg (212 lb)	350 cm (140 in)	22 cm (8.7 in)	(Russia) Belogorie Belgorod
5	Lazar Cirovic	26 February 1992	2 m (6 ft 7 in)	88 kg (194 lb)	343 cm (135 in)	0 cm (0 in)	(Italy) SSCD Pallavolo Padova
6	Nikola Pekovic	6 March 1990	1.76 m (5 ft 9 in)	77 kg (170 lb)	305 cm (120 in)	0 cm (0 in)	(Serbia) Partizan
7	Petar Krsmanovic	1 June 1990	2.05 m (6 ft 9 in)	98 kg (216 lb)	354 cm (139 in)	13 cm (5.1 in)	(Russia) Gazprom-Ugra Surgut
8	Marko Ivovic	22 December 1990	1.94 m (6 ft 4 in)	89 kg (196 lb)	365 cm (144 in)	22 cm (8.7 in)	(Russia) Lokomotiva Novosibirsk
9	Nikola Jovovic	13 February 1992	1.97 m (6 ft 6 in)	75 kg (165 lb)	335 cm (132 in)	22 cm (8.7 in)	(Turkey) ZIRIATBANK Ankara
10	Miran Kujundžić	19 June 1997	1.96 m (6 ft 5 in)	86 kg (190 lb)	348 cm (137 in)	0 cm (0 in)	(Serbia) Vojvodina NS Seme
11	Aleksa Batak	18 January 2000	1.95 m (6 ft 5 in)	74 kg (163 lb)	325 cm (128 in)	0 cm (0 in)	(Serbia) Mladi Radnik Pozarevac
12	Pavle Peric	7 August 1998	2.07 m (6 ft 9 in)	96 kg (212 lb)	335 cm (132 in)	0 cm (0 in)	(Serbia) Vojvodina NS Seme
13	Stevan Simic	21 March 1996	2.01 m (6 ft 7 in)	85 kg (187 lb)	330 cm (130 in)	0 cm (0 in)	(Serbia) Vojvodina NS Seme
14	Aleksandar Atanasijevic	4 September 1991	2 m (6 ft 7 in)	92 kg (203 lb)	350 cm (140 in)	22 cm (8.7 in)	(Italy) Sir Safety Perugia
15	Nemanja Masulovic	5 October 1995	2.05 m (6 ft 9 in)	92 kg (203 lb)	360 cm (140 in)	0 cm (0 in)	(Serbia) Vojvodina NS Seme
16	Drazen Luburic	2 November 1993	2.02 m (6 ft 8 in)	90 kg (200 lb)	337 cm (133 in)	13 cm (5.1 in)	(Turkey) HALKBANK Ankara
17	Neven Majstorovic	17 March 1989	1.93 m (6 ft 4 in)	90 kg (200 lb)	335 cm (132 in)	13 cm (5.1 in)	(Russia) C.S.M.U. CRAIOVA
18	Marko Podrascanin	29 August 1987	2.03 m (6 ft 8 in)	100 kg (220 lb)	354 cm (139 in)	41 cm (16 in)	(Italy) Sir Safety Perugia
19	Stefan Negic	17 January 2000	1.8 m (5 ft 11 in)	75 kg (165 lb)	305 cm (120 in)	0 cm (0 in)	(Serbia) Vojvodina NS Seme
20	Srecko Lisinac	17 May 1992	2.05 m (6 ft 9 in)	90 kg (200 lb)	355 cm (140 in)	22 cm (8.7 in)	(Italy) Trentino Volley
21	Vuk Todorovic	23 April 1998	1.9 m (6 ft 3 in)	74 kg (163 lb)	315 cm (124 in)	0 cm (0 in)	(Serbia) Vojvodina NS Seme
23	Bozidar Vucicevic	9 December 1998	2.05 m (6 ft 9 in)	96 kg (212 lb)	355 cm (140 in)	0 cm (0 in)	(Serbia) Vojvodina NS Seme
27	Stefan Kovacevic	22 February 1995	2.05 m (6 ft 9 in)	88 kg (194 lb)	335 cm (132 in)	0 cm (0 in)	(Serbia) Vojvodina NS Seme
28	Luka Tadic	10 October 2000	2.04 m (6 ft 8 in)	100 kg (220 lb)	320 cm (130 in)	0 cm (0 in)	(Serbia) Crvena Zvezda Beograd

== Pool D ==
=== France ===
The following is the French roster in the 2019 Intercontinental Olympic Qualification Tournament.

Head Coach: Laurent Tillie

No.	Name	Date of birth	Height	Weight	Spike	Block	2019 club
2	Jenia Grebennikov	13 August 1990	1.88 m (6 ft 2 in)	85 kg (187 lb)	345 cm (136 in)	21 cm (8.3 in)	(Italy) Trentino Volley
3	Luka Basic	29 January 1995	2.01 m (6 ft 7 in)	77 kg (170 lb)	330 cm (130 in)	0 cm (0 in)	(Italy) Revivre Axipower Milano
4	Jean Patry	27 December 1996	2.07 m (6 ft 9 in)	94 kg (207 lb)	357 cm (141 in)	8 cm (3.1 in)	(France) Montpellier VUC
5	Raphaël Corre	21 November 1989	1.96 m (6 ft 5 in)	85 kg (187 lb)	335 cm (132 in)	0 cm (0 in)	(France) AS CANNES
6	Benjamin Toniutti (C)	30 October 1989	1.83 m (6 ft 0 in)	72 kg (159 lb)	320 cm (130 in)	30 cm (12 in)	(Poland) Zaksa Kędzierzyn-KoźlE
7	Kevin Tillie	2 November 1990	2 m (6 ft 7 in)	85 kg (187 lb)	345 cm (136 in)	21 cm (8.3 in)	(Italy) MODENA VOLLEY PUNTO
8	Julien Lyneel	15 April 1990	1.92 m (6 ft 4 in)	88 kg (194 lb)	345 cm (136 in)	8 cm (3.1 in)	(Poland) Jastrzębski Wiegel
9	Earvin N'Gapeth	12 February 1991	1.94 m (6 ft 4 in)	96 kg (212 lb)	358 cm (141 in)	30 cm (12 in)	(Russia) Zenit Kazan
10	Kevin Le Roux	11 May 1989	2.09 m (6 ft 10 in)	95 kg (209 lb)	365 cm (144 in)	30 cm (12 in)	(Brazil) Sada Cruzeiro Volei
11	Antoine Brizard	22 May 1994	1.96 m (6 ft 5 in)	96 kg (212 lb)	340 cm (130 in)	8 cm (3.1 in)	(Poland) AZS POLITECHNIKA WARSZAWSKA
12	Stephen Boyer	10 April 1996	1.96 m (6 ft 5 in)	77 kg (170 lb)	355 cm (140 in)	8 cm (3.1 in)	(Italy) Calzedonia Verona
13	Gildas Prevert	15 June 1996	2.04 m (6 ft 8 in)	90 kg (200 lb)	350 cm (140 in)	0 cm (0 in)	(France) RENNES EC
14	Nicolas Le Goff	15 February 1992	2.06 m (6 ft 9 in)	114 kg (251 lb)	365 cm (144 in)	21 cm (8.3 in)	(Germany) SCC Berlin
15	Julien Winkelmuller	31 July 1994	1.96 m (6 ft 5 in)	86 kg (190 lb)	340 cm (130 in)	0 cm (0 in)	(France) CHAUMONT VOLLEY-BALL 52
16	Daryl Bultor	17 November 1995	1.97 m (6 ft 6 in)	94 kg (207 lb)	352 cm (139 in)	8 cm (3.1 in)	(France) Arago de Sète
17	Trevor Clevenot	28 June 1994	1.99 m (6 ft 6 in)	89 kg (196 lb)	345 cm (136 in)	0 cm (0 in)	(Italy) Revivre Axipower Milano
18	Thibault Rossard	28 August 1993	1.94 m (6 ft 4 in)	85 kg (187 lb)	350 cm (140 in)	8 cm (3.1 in)	(Poland) Asseco Resovia Rzeszów
19	Yacine Louati	4 March 1992	1.98 m (6 ft 6 in)	92 kg (203 lb)	345 cm (136 in)	0 cm (0 in)	(Italy) Kioene Padova
20	Nicolas Rossard	23 May 1990	1.83 m (6 ft 0 in)	64 kg (141 lb)	315 cm (124 in)	13 cm (5.1 in)	(Germany) SCC Berlin
21	Barthélémy Chinenyeze	28 February 1998	2.01 m (6 ft 7 in)	81 kg (179 lb)	357 cm (141 in)	8 cm (3.1 in)	(France) Tours Volley-Ball
22	Rafael Redwitz	12 August 1980	1.9 m (6 ft 3 in)	85 kg (187 lb)	330 cm (130 in)	0 cm (0 in)	(Poland) Asseco Resovia Rzeszów
23	Timothée Carle	30 November 1995	1.95 m (6 ft 5 in)	83 kg (183 lb)	336 cm (132 in)	0 cm (0 in)	(France) GFCA VOLLEY BALL
24	Kevin Rodriguez	13 November 1994	2 m (6 ft 7 in)	95 kg (209 lb)	335 cm (132 in)	0 cm (0 in)	(France) Chaumont VB 52
25	Kévin Kaba	8 June 1994	2.03 m (6 ft 8 in)	98 kg (216 lb)	335 cm (132 in)	0 cm (0 in)	(France) Montpellier VUC
26	Benjamin Diez	4 April 1998	1.83 m (6 ft 0 in)	80 kg (180 lb)	320 cm (130 in)	0 cm (0 in)	(France) Montpellier VUC

=== Poland ===
The following is the Polish roster in the 2019 Intercontinental Olympic Qualification Tournament.

Head Coach: Vital Heynen

No.	Name	Date of birth	Height	Weight	Spike	Block	2019 club
1	Piotr Nowakowski	18 December 1987	2.05 m (6 ft 9 in)	90 kg (200 lb)	355 cm (140 in)	31 cm (12 in)	(Poland) Trefl Gdańsk
2	Maciej Muzaj	21 May 1994	2.08 m (6 ft 10 in)	86 kg (190 lb)	360 cm (140 in)	12 cm (4.7 in)	(Poland) ONICO Warszawa
3	Dawid Konarski	31 August 1989	1.98 m (6 ft 6 in)	93 kg (205 lb)	353 cm (139 in)	12 cm (4.7 in)	(Poland) KS Jastrzębski Węgiel
4	Marcin Komenda	24 May 1996	1.98 m (6 ft 6 in)	90 kg (200 lb)	335 cm (132 in)	0 cm (0 in)	(Poland) GKS Katowice
5	Lukasz Kaczmarek	29 June 1994	2.04 m (6 ft 8 in)	99 kg (218 lb)	345 cm (136 in)	0 cm (0 in)	(Poland) ZAKSA Kędzierzyn Koźle
7	Artur Szalpuk	20 March 1995	2.01 m (6 ft 7 in)	93 kg (205 lb)	350 cm (140 in)	12 cm (4.7 in)	(Poland) PGE Skra Belchatow
8	Jedrzej Gruszczynski	13 November 1997	1.86 m (6 ft 1 in)	78 kg (172 lb)	328 cm (129 in)	0 cm (0 in)	(Poland) Cuprum Lubin
9	Wilfredo Leon Venero	31 July 1993	2.02 m (6 ft 8 in)	96 kg (212 lb)	374 cm (147 in)	9 cm (3.5 in)	(Italy) Sir Safety Perugia
10	Damian Wojtaszek	7 September 1988	1.8 m (5 ft 11 in)	76 kg (168 lb)	330 cm (130 in)	12 cm (4.7 in)	(Poland) ONICO Warszawa
11	Fabian Drzyzga	3 January 1990	1.96 m (6 ft 5 in)	90 kg (200 lb)	325 cm (128 in)	33 cm (13 in)	(Russia) VC Lokomotiv Novosibirsk
12	Grzegorz Lomacz	1 October 1987	1.87 m (6 ft 2 in)	80 kg (180 lb)	335 cm (132 in)	6 cm (2.4 in)	(Poland) PGE Skra Belchatow
13	Michal Kubiak (C)	23 February 1988	1.91 m (6 ft 3 in)	80 kg (180 lb)	328 cm (129 in)	25 cm (9.8 in)	(Japan) Panasonic Panthers
14	Aleksander Sliwka	24 May 1995	1.96 m (6 ft 5 in)	88 kg (194 lb)	340 cm (130 in)	0 cm (0 in)	(Poland) ZAKSA Kędzierzyn Koźle
15	Jakub Kochanowski	17 July 1997	1.99 m (6 ft 6 in)	89 kg (196 lb)	353 cm (139 in)	0 cm (0 in)	(Poland) PGE Skra Belchatow
17	Pawel Zatorski	21 June 1990	1.84 m (6 ft 0 in)	73 kg (161 lb)	328 cm (129 in)	21 cm (8.3 in)	(Poland) ZAKSA Kędzierzyn Koźle
18	Bartosz Kwolek	17 July 1997	1.92 m (6 ft 4 in)	91 kg (201 lb)	343 cm (135 in)	0 cm (0 in)	(Poland) ONICO Warszawa
19	Marcin Janusz	31 July 1994	1.95 m (6 ft 5 in)	85 kg (187 lb)	330 cm (130 in)	0 cm (0 in)	(Poland) Trefl Gdańsk
20	Mateusz Bieniek	5 April 1994	2.1 m (6 ft 11 in)	98 kg (216 lb)	351 cm (138 in)	0 cm (0 in)	(Poland) ZAKSA Kędzierzyn Koźle
21	Tomasz Fornal	31 August 1997	1.98 m (6 ft 6 in)	92 kg (203 lb)	340 cm (130 in)	0 cm (0 in)	(Poland) Cerrad Czarni Radom
22	Bartosz Bednorz	25 July 1994	2.01 m (6 ft 7 in)	84 kg (185 lb)	350 cm (140 in)	0 cm (0 in)	(Italy) Modena Volley
23	Jakub Popiwczak	17 April 1996	1.8 m (5 ft 11 in)	77 kg (170 lb)	315 cm (124 in)	0 cm (0 in)	(Poland) KS Jastrzębski Węgiel
27	Piotr Łukasik	11 July 1994	2.08 m (6 ft 10 in)	112 kg (247 lb)	350 cm (140 in)	0 cm (0 in)	(Poland) ONICO Warszawa
77	Karol Klos	8 August 1989	2.01 m (6 ft 7 in)	87 kg (192 lb)	357 cm (141 in)	13 cm (5.1 in)	(Poland) PGE Skra Belchatow
88	Andrzej Wrona	27 December 1988	2.05 m (6 ft 9 in)	95 kg (209 lb)	350 cm (140 in)	0 cm (0 in)	(Poland) ONICO Warszawa
99	Norbert Huber	14 August 1998	2.04 m (6 ft 8 in)	80 kg (180 lb)	351 cm (138 in)	0 cm (0 in)	(Poland) Cerrad Czarni Radom

=== Slovenia ===
The following is the Slovenian roster in the 2019 Intercontinental Olympic Qualification Tournament.

Head Coach: Alberto Giuliani

No.	Name	Date of birth	Height	Weight	Spike	Block	2019 club
1	Tonček Štern	14 November 1995	1.98 m (6 ft 6 in)	95 kg (209 lb)	352 cm (139 in)	8 cm (3.1 in)	(Italy) Latina
2	Alen Pajenk	23 April 1986	2.03 m (6 ft 8 in)	92 kg (203 lb)	366 cm (144 in)	8 cm (3.1 in)	(Poland) WKS Czarni Radom
3	Jure Kasnik	8 July 1993	1.9 m (6 ft 3 in)	86 kg (190 lb)	320 cm (130 in)	0 cm (0 in)	(Austria) AICH DOB
4	Jan Kozamernik	24 December 1995	2.04 m (6 ft 8 in)	103 kg (227 lb)	360 cm (140 in)	8 cm (3.1 in)	(Italy) Power Volley Milano
5	Alen Šket	28 March 1988	2.05 m (6 ft 9 in)	92 kg (203 lb)	350 cm (140 in)	0 cm (0 in)	(Turkey) Halkbank
6	Mitja Gasparini	26 June 1984	2.02 m (6 ft 8 in)	93 kg (205 lb)	346 cm (136 in)	8 cm (3.1 in)	(Japan) Toyoda Gosei
7	Uroš Pavlovic	30 March 1992	2 m (6 ft 7 in)	93 kg (205 lb)	337 cm (133 in)	0 cm (0 in)	(Slovenia) ACH VOLLEY
9	Dejan Vinčić	15 September 1986	2 m (6 ft 7 in)	93 kg (205 lb)	354 cm (139 in)	8 cm (3.1 in)	(Poland) WKS Czarni Radom
10	Sašo Štalekar	3 May 1996	2.14 m (7 ft 0 in)	98 kg (216 lb)	354 cm (139 in)	8 cm (3.1 in)	(Slovenia) CALCIT VOLLEYBALL
11	Žiga Štern	2 January 1994	1.93 m (6 ft 4 in)	88 kg (194 lb)	346 cm (136 in)	0 cm (0 in)	(Italy) Latina
12	Jan Klobucar	11 December 1992	1.96 m (6 ft 5 in)	92 kg (203 lb)	344 cm (135 in)	8 cm (3.1 in)	(Italy) Piacenza
13	Jani Kovačič	14 June 1992	1.86 m (6 ft 1 in)	83 kg (183 lb)	320 cm (130 in)	8 cm (3.1 in)	(Italy) RAVENNA
14	Urban Toman	21 October 1997	1.85 m (6 ft 1 in)	82 kg (181 lb)	310 cm (120 in)	0 cm (0 in)	(Germany) United VolleyS
15	Matic Videčnik	31 July 1993	2.03 m (6 ft 8 in)	98 kg (216 lb)	347 cm (137 in)	0 cm (0 in)	(Slovenia) ACH Volley
16	Gregor Ropret	1 March 1989	1.92 m (6 ft 4 in)	89 kg (196 lb)	343 cm (135 in)	8 cm (3.1 in)	(France) NANTES
17	Tine Urnaut (C)	3 September 1988	2 m (6 ft 7 in)	88 kg (194 lb)	365 cm (144 in)	8 cm (3.1 in)	(China) SHANGHAI
18	Klemen Čebulj	21 February 1992	2.02 m (6 ft 8 in)	96 kg (212 lb)	366 cm (144 in)	8 cm (3.1 in)	(Italy) Trentino Volley
19	Rok Možič	17 January 2002	1.93 m (6 ft 4 in)	78 kg (172 lb)	334 cm (131 in)	0 cm (0 in)	(Slovenia) OK MARIBOR
20	Uroš Planinšič	9 May 1998	1.86 m (6 ft 1 in)	84 kg (185 lb)	315 cm (124 in)	0 cm (0 in)	(Slovenia) OK MARIBOR
21	Matej Kök	11 December 1996	1.96 m (6 ft 5 in)	96 kg (212 lb)	355 cm (140 in)	0 cm (0 in)	(Slovenia) ACH Volley
22	Matic Vrtovec	14 May 1997	1.96 m (6 ft 5 in)	90 kg (200 lb)	335 cm (132 in)	0 cm (0 in)	(Slovenia) OK SALONIT

=== Tunisia ===
The following is the Tunisian roster in the 2019 Intercontinental Olympic Qualification Tournament.

Head Coach: Antonio Giaccobe

No.	Name	Date of birth	Height	Weight	Spike	Block	2019 club
1	Mohamed Ridene	14 February 1996	1.8 m (5 ft 11 in)	74 kg (163 lb)	305 cm (120 in)	0 cm (0 in)	(Tunisia) E.S.SAHEL
2	Ahmed Kadhi	19 April 1989	1.99 m (6 ft 6 in)	99 kg (218 lb)	345 cm (136 in)	9 cm (3.5 in)	(Tunisia) E.S.Sahel
3	Khaled Ben Slimene	14 December 1994	1.93 m (6 ft 4 in)	78 kg (172 lb)	290 cm (110 in)	0 cm (0 in)	(Tunisia) E.S.Tunis
4	Aymen Redissi	5 December 1992	1.75 m (5 ft 9 in)	75 kg (165 lb)	290 cm (110 in)	0 cm (0 in)	(Tunisia) E.S.TUNIS
5	Hosni Kara Mosly (C)	1 June 1980	1.97 m (6 ft 6 in)	82 kg (181 lb)	338 cm (133 in)	0 cm (0 in)	(Tunisia) E.S.TUNIS
6	Mohamed Ali Ben Othmen Miladi	12 May 1991	1.88 m (6 ft 2 in)	73 kg (161 lb)	315 cm (124 in)	2 cm (0.79 in)	(Tunisia) E.S.Tunis
7	Elyes Karamosli	22 August 1989	1.98 m (6 ft 6 in)	99 kg (218 lb)	330 cm (130 in)	1 cm (0.39 in)	(Tunisia) E.S.Tunis
8	Nabil Azzouzi	24 August 1996	1.98 m (6 ft 6 in)	72 kg (159 lb)	320 cm (130 in)	0 cm (0 in)	(Tunisia) A.S.Marsa
9	Amen Allah Hmissi	6 April 1988	1.8 m (5 ft 11 in)	78 kg (172 lb)	310 cm (120 in)	2 cm (0.79 in)	(Tunisia) E.S.TUNIS
10	Hamza Nagga	29 May 1990	1.91 m (6 ft 3 in)	86 kg (190 lb)	335 cm (132 in)	10 cm (3.9 in)	(Tunisia) E.S.Sahel
11	Ismail Moalla	30 January 1990	1.95 m (6 ft 5 in)	87 kg (192 lb)	324 cm (128 in)	9 cm (3.5 in)	(Tunisia) C.S.SFAX
12	Aymen Karoui	7 April 1989	1.94 m (6 ft 4 in)	102 kg (225 lb)	350 cm (140 in)	2 cm (0.79 in)	(Tunisia) E.S.Tunis
13	Selim Mbareki	6 March 1996	1.98 m (6 ft 6 in)	79 kg (174 lb)	320 cm (130 in)	0 cm (0 in)	(Tunisia) C O Kelibia
14	Haykel Jerbi	4 April 1988	1.99 m (6 ft 6 in)	81 kg (179 lb)	280 cm (110 in)	0 cm (0 in)	(Tunisia) E S Sahel
15	Fedi Ben Hmida	19 January 1996	2 m (6 ft 7 in)	86 kg (190 lb)	335 cm (132 in)	0 cm (0 in)	(Tunisia) E.S.Sahel
16	Mohamed Ayech	31 March 1991	1.98 m (6 ft 6 in)	86 kg (190 lb)	324 cm (128 in)	2 cm (0.79 in)	(Tunisia) E.S.Sahel
17	Chokri Jouini	25 April 1989	1.96 m (6 ft 5 in)	72 kg (159 lb)	355 cm (140 in)	1 cm (0.39 in)	(Tunisia) E.S.TUNIS
18	Ali Bongui	14 August 1996	1.8 m (5 ft 11 in)	75 kg (165 lb)	225 cm (89 in)	0 cm (0 in)	(Tunisia) C.S.Sfaxien
19	Aymen Bougerra	1 November 2001	1.88 m (6 ft 2 in)	70 kg (150 lb)	325 cm (128 in)	0 cm (0 in)	(Tunisia) E.S.TUNIS
20	Saddem Hmissi	16 February 1991	1.86 m (6 ft 1 in)	75 kg (165 lb)	312 cm (123 in)	1 cm (0.39 in)	(Tunisia) E.S.TUNIS

== Pool E ==
=== Cuba ===
The following is the Cuban roster in the 2019 Intercontinental Olympic Qualification Tournament.

Head Coach: Nicolas Vives

No.	Name	Date of birth	Height	Weight	Spike	Block	2019 club
1	Jose Israel Masso Alvarez	2 December 1997	1.99 m (6 ft 6 in)	79 kg (174 lb)	349 cm (137 in)	1 cm (0.39 in)	(Cuba) Guantanamo V.C.
2	Osniel Lazaro Mergarejo Hernandez	18 December 1997	1.95 m (6 ft 5 in)	83 kg (183 lb)	345 cm (136 in)	2 cm (0.79 in)	(Cuba) Santic Spiritus
3	Julio Cesar Cardenas Morales	4 September 2000	1.9 m (6 ft 3 in)	72 kg (159 lb)	345 cm (136 in)	0 cm (0 in)	(Cuba) Matanzas V.C.
4	Marlon Yang Herrera	23 May 2001	2.02 m (6 ft 8 in)	75 kg (165 lb)	345 cm (136 in)	0 cm (0 in)	(Cuba) Villa Clara V.C.
5	Javier Octavio Concepcion Rojas	27 December 1997	2 m (6 ft 7 in)	84 kg (185 lb)	356 cm (140 in)	1 cm (0.39 in)	(Cuba) La Habana V.C.
6	Jose Carlos Romero Gonzalez	5 January 1999	1.98 m (6 ft 6 in)	85 kg (187 lb)	350 cm (140 in)	0 cm (0 in)	(Cuba) Cienfuegos V.C.
7	Yonder Roman Garcia Alvarez	26 February 1993	1.83 m (6 ft 0 in)	78 kg (172 lb)	325 cm (128 in)	0 cm (0 in)	(Cuba) Ciudad Habana V.C.
8	Julio Alberto Gomez Galves	24 July 1999	1.91 m (6 ft 3 in)	72 kg (159 lb)	343 cm (135 in)	0 cm (0 in)	(Cuba) La Habana V.C.
9	Livan Osoria Rodriguez (C)	5 February 1994	2.01 m (6 ft 7 in)	96 kg (212 lb)	345 cm (136 in)	0 cm (0 in)	Santiago de Cuba V.C.
11	Lyvan Taboada Diaz	4 October 1998	1.91 m (6 ft 3 in)	75 kg (165 lb)	343 cm (135 in)	0 cm (0 in)	(Cuba) La Habana V.C.
12	Jesus Herrera Jaime	4 April 1995	1.94 m (6 ft 4 in)	85 kg (187 lb)	340 cm (130 in)	0 cm (0 in)	(Cuba) Artemisa V.C.
13	Robertlandy Simon Aties	11 June 1987	2.08 m (6 ft 10 in)	114 kg (251 lb)	358 cm (141 in)	10 cm (3.9 in)	(Italy) Cucine Lube Civitanova
14	Adrian Eduardo Goide Arredondo	26 June 1998	1.91 m (6 ft 3 in)	80 kg (180 lb)	344 cm (135 in)	3 cm (1.2 in)	(Cuba) Sancti Spiritus V.C.
15	Yohan Armando Leon Napoles	24 January 1995	2 m (6 ft 7 in)	98 kg (216 lb)	345 cm (136 in)	5 cm (2.0 in)	(Cuba) Camaguey V.C.
16	Victor Ramon Andreu Flores	31 August 2001	1.88 m (6 ft 2 in)	72 kg (159 lb)	345 cm (136 in)	0 cm (0 in)	(Cuba) Camaguey V.C.
17	Roamy Raul Alonso Arce	24 July 1997	2.01 m (6 ft 7 in)	93 kg (205 lb)	350 cm (140 in)	1 cm (0.39 in)	(Cuba) Matanzas V.C.
18	Miguel Angel Lopez Castro	25 March 1997	1.89 m (6 ft 2 in)	75 kg (165 lb)	345 cm (136 in)	2 cm (0.79 in)	(Cuba) Cienfuegos V.C.
19	Lionnis Salazar Rubiera	25 July 1997	1.85 m (6 ft 1 in)	77 kg (170 lb)	332 cm (131 in)	1 cm (0.39 in)	Santiago de Cuba V.C.
21	Raico Antonio Altunaga Saroza	2 September 1999	1.98 m (6 ft 6 in)	76 kg (168 lb)	352 cm (139 in)	1 cm (0.39 in)	(Cuba) Santic Spiritus V.C.

=== Iran ===
The following is the Iranian roster in the 2019 Intercontinental Olympic Qualification Tournament.

Head Coach: Igor Kolakovic

No.	Name	Date of birth	Height	Weight	Spike	Block	2019 club
1	Shahram Mahmoudi	20 July 1988	1.98 m (6 ft 6 in)	95 kg (209 lb)	347 cm (137 in)	0 cm (0 in)	(Iran) Khatam Ardakan
2	Milad Ebadipour	17 October 1993	1.96 m (6 ft 5 in)	78 kg (172 lb)	350 cm (140 in)	3 cm (1.2 in)	(Poland) PGE Skra Belchatow
3	Amir Mohammad Falahat	19 May 2000	1.99 m (6 ft 6 in)	89 kg (196 lb)	330 cm (130 in)	0 cm (0 in)	(Iran) PAYKAN
4	Saeid Marouf (C)	20 October 1985	1.89 m (6 ft 2 in)	81 kg (179 lb)	331 cm (130 in)	36 cm (14 in)	(Italy) EMMA VILLAS SIENA
5	Farhad Ghaemi	28 August 1989	1.97 m (6 ft 6 in)	73 kg (161 lb)	355 cm (140 in)	30 cm (12 in)	(Turkey) ZIRAAT BANK
6	Mohammad Mousavi	22 August 1987	2.03 m (6 ft 8 in)	86 kg (190 lb)	362 cm (143 in)	2 cm (0.79 in)	(Iran) PAYAM KHORASAN
7	Purya Fayazi	12 January 1993	1.95 m (6 ft 5 in)	92 kg (203 lb)	335 cm (132 in)	0 cm (0 in)	(Iran) SHAHRDARI VARAMIN
8	Mohammad Reza Hazratpour	31 March 1999	1.87 m (6 ft 2 in)	87 kg (192 lb)	300 cm (120 in)	0 cm (0 in)	(Iran) SAIPA
9	Masoud Gholami	2 April 1990	2.04 m (6 ft 8 in)	93 kg (205 lb)	349 cm (137 in)	0 cm (0 in)	(Iran) SHAHRDARI VARAMIN
10	Amir Ghafour	6 June 1991	2.02 m (6 ft 8 in)	90 kg (200 lb)	354 cm (139 in)	11 cm (4.3 in)	(Italy) MONZA
11	Saber Kazemi	24 December 1998	2.05 m (6 ft 9 in)	87 kg (192 lb)	340 cm (130 in)	0 cm (0 in)	(Turkey) ZIRAAT BANK
14	Mohammad Javad Manavinejad	27 November 1995	1.98 m (6 ft 6 in)	94 kg (207 lb)	340 cm (130 in)	0 cm (0 in)	(Iran) VERONA
15	Aliasghar Mojarad	30 October 1997	2.05 m (6 ft 9 in)	90 kg (200 lb)	330 cm (130 in)	1 cm (0.39 in)	(Iran) SHAHRDARI VARAMIN
16	Ali Shafiei	21 September 1991	1.98 m (6 ft 6 in)	80 kg (180 lb)	348 cm (137 in)	0 cm (0 in)	(Iran) SAIPA
17	Meisam Salehi	17 November 1998	1.98 m (6 ft 6 in)	89 kg (196 lb)	345 cm (136 in)	0 cm (0 in)	(Iran) KALLEH
18	Salim Cheperli	19 December 1996	2.01 m (6 ft 7 in)	80 kg (180 lb)	340 cm (130 in)	0 cm (0 in)	(Iran) Paykan
19	Mohammad Reza Moazzen	20 September 1991	1.75 m (5 ft 9 in)	75 kg (165 lb)	292 cm (115 in)	0 cm (0 in)	(Iran) SHAHRDARI TABRIZ
20	Porya Yali	21 January 1999	2.09 m (6 ft 10 in)	81 kg (179 lb)	335 cm (132 in)	0 cm (0 in)	(Iran) PAYKAN
21	Morteza Sharifi	27 May 1999	1.93 m (6 ft 4 in)	83 kg (183 lb)	340 cm (130 in)	0 cm (0 in)	(Italy) VERONA
22	Amir Hossein Esfandiar	24 January 1999	2.09 m (6 ft 10 in)	110 kg (240 lb)	330 cm (130 in)	1 cm (0.39 in)	(Iran) Paykan
23	Ali Ramezani	5 May 1998	2 m (6 ft 7 in)	103 kg (227 lb)	330 cm (130 in)	1 cm (0.39 in)	(Iran) kalleh Mazandaran
24	Javad Karimi	1 March 1998	2.04 m (6 ft 8 in)	104 kg (229 lb)	330 cm (130 in)	1 cm (0.39 in)	(Iran) PAYKAN
25	Amir Hossein Toukhteh	9 April 2001	2.03 m (6 ft 8 in)	79 kg (174 lb)	360 cm (140 in)	0 cm (0 in)	(Iran) Saipa
26	Amin Razavi	15 September 1990	1.93 m (6 ft 4 in)	85 kg (187 lb)	294 cm (116 in)	0 cm (0 in)	(Iran) SHAHRDARI VARAMIN
28	Mehran Feyz	23 November 2001	2.05 m (6 ft 9 in)	77 kg (170 lb)	350 cm (140 in)	0 cm (0 in)	(Iran) kalleh Mazandaran

=== Mexico ===
The following is the Mexican roster in the 2019 Intercontinental Olympic Qualification Tournament.

Head Coach: Jorge Miguel Azair Lopez

No.	Name	Date of birth	Height	Weight	Spike	Block	2019 club
1	Daniel Vargas	1 September 1986	1.97 m (6 ft 6 in)	94 kg (207 lb)	340 cm (130 in)	12 cm (4.7 in)	(Turkey) PALANDOKEN BELEDIYESI
3	Ridl Alexis Garay Nava	9 June 1997	1.94 m (6 ft 4 in)	74 kg (163 lb)	326 cm (128 in)	0 cm (0 in)	(Mexico) JALISCO
4	Gonzalo Ruiz De La Cruz	28 April 1988	1.86 m (6 ft 1 in)	87 kg (192 lb)	345 cm (136 in)	0 cm (0 in)	(Mexico) IMSS ATN
5	Jesus Rangel	20 September 1980	1.9 m (6 ft 3 in)	82 kg (181 lb)	337 cm (133 in)	17 cm (6.7 in)	(Mexico) NUEVO LEON
6	Jesus Alberto Perales	22 December 1993	1.97 m (6 ft 6 in)	88 kg (194 lb)	328 cm (129 in)	1 cm (0.39 in)	(Mexico) NUEVO LEON
8	Guerson Acosta	19 July 1992	1.94 m (6 ft 4 in)	83 kg (183 lb)	342 cm (135 in)	0 cm (0 in)	(Mexico) NUEVO LEON
9	Axel Manuel Tellez Rodriguez	8 October 1999	1.99 m (6 ft 6 in)	100 kg (220 lb)	328 cm (129 in)	0 cm (0 in)	(Mexico) NUEVO LEON
10	Pedro Rangel (C)	16 September 1988	1.92 m (6 ft 4 in)	85 kg (187 lb)	340 cm (130 in)	31 cm (12 in)	(Mexico) NUEVO LEON
11	Jorge Barajas	7 May 1991	1.88 m (6 ft 2 in)	80 kg (180 lb)	320 cm (130 in)	11 cm (4.3 in)	(Mexico) COLIMA
12	Alán Guillermo Cervantes Acosta	8 November 1997	1.95 m (6 ft 5 in)	80 kg (180 lb)	335 cm (132 in)	0 cm (0 in)	(Mexico) NUEVO LEON
13	Edgar Alejandro Mendoza Burgueño	8 January 1999	1.97 m (6 ft 6 in)	94 kg (207 lb)	315 cm (124 in)	0 cm (0 in)	(Mexico) NAYARIT
14	Jonathan Martínez Garcia	30 September 1991	1.97 m (6 ft 6 in)	100 kg (220 lb)	342 cm (135 in)	0 cm (0 in)	(Mexico) IMSS ATN
15	Alan Gabriel Martinez	21 January 1995	1.87 m (6 ft 2 in)	79 kg (174 lb)	318 cm (125 in)	2 cm (0.79 in)	(Mexico) CHIHUAHUA
16	Miguel Antonio Chávez Pasos	13 May 1996	2.02 m (6 ft 8 in)	73 kg (161 lb)	335 cm (132 in)	0 cm (0 in)	(Mexico) SONORA
17	Nestor Orellana	7 January 1992	1.92 m (6 ft 4 in)	84 kg (185 lb)	332 cm (131 in)	10 cm (3.9 in)	(Mexico) NUEVO LEON
19	Francisco Eduardo Olvera Sanchez	24 September 1995	1.88 m (6 ft 2 in)	70 kg (150 lb)	320 cm (130 in)	0 cm (0 in)	(Mexico) Baja California
20	Julian Duarte	19 June 1994	2 m (6 ft 7 in)	98 kg (216 lb)	321 cm (126 in)	1 cm (0.39 in)	(Mexico) NUEVO LEON
21	Diego González Castañeda	15 February 2000	1.97 m (6 ft 6 in)	75 kg (165 lb)	333 cm (131 in)	0 cm (0 in)	(Mexico) JALISCO
22	Miguel Sarabia Delgado	23 March 1999	1.94 m (6 ft 4 in)	88 kg (194 lb)	338 cm (133 in)	0 cm (0 in)	(Mexico) Nuevo Leon
23	Alejandro Moreno	16 September 1994	1.91 m (6 ft 3 in)	80 kg (180 lb)	338 cm (133 in)	1 cm (0.39 in)	(Mexico) NUEVO LEON
24	Raymond Stephens Zamora	26 July 1999	1.88 m (6 ft 2 in)	83 kg (183 lb)	315 cm (124 in)	0 cm (0 in)	(Mexico) BAJA CALIFORNIA
25	Christian Aranda	9 April 1997	1.9 m (6 ft 3 in)	65 kg (143 lb)	322 cm (127 in)	0 cm (0 in)	(Mexico) BAJA CALIFORNIA

=== Russia ===
The following is the Russian roster in the 2019 Intercontinental Olympic Qualification Tournament.

Head Coach: Tuomas Sammelvuo

No.	Name	Date of birth	Height	Weight	Spike	Block	2019 club
2	Ilia Vlasov	3 August 1995	2.12 m (6 ft 11 in)	98 kg (216 lb)	360 cm (140 in)	10 cm (3.9 in)	(Russia) Dinamo
3	Dmitry Kovalev	15 March 1991	1.98 m (6 ft 6 in)	82 kg (181 lb)	340 cm (130 in)	0 cm (0 in)	(Russia) Ural
4	Artem Volvich	22 January 1990	2.08 m (6 ft 10 in)	96 kg (212 lb)	350 cm (140 in)	22 cm (8.7 in)	(Russia) Zenit Kazan
6	Anton Karpukhov	23 April 1988	1.97 m (6 ft 6 in)	88 kg (194 lb)	337 cm (133 in)	0 cm (0 in)	(Russia) Kuzbass
7	Dmitry Volkov	25 May 1995	2.01 m (6 ft 7 in)	88 kg (194 lb)	340 cm (130 in)	10 cm (3.9 in)	(Russia) Fakel
8	Anton Semyshev	22 August 1997	2.01 m (6 ft 7 in)	90 kg (200 lb)	350 cm (140 in)	0 cm (0 in)	(Russia) Belogorie
9	Ivan Iakovlev	17 April 1995	2.07 m (6 ft 9 in)	89 kg (196 lb)	360 cm (140 in)	0 cm (0 in)	(Russia) Fakel
10	Fedor Voronkov	10 December 1995	2.07 m (6 ft 9 in)	85 kg (187 lb)	350 cm (140 in)	0 cm (0 in)	(Russia) Nova V.C.
11	Igor Philippov	19 March 1991	2.05 m (6 ft 9 in)	107 kg (236 lb)	340 cm (130 in)	0 cm (0 in)	(Russia) Ural
12	Alexander Butko	18 March 1986	1.98 m (6 ft 6 in)	97 kg (214 lb)	339 cm (133 in)	10 cm (3.9 in)	(Russia) Zenit Kazan
13	Dmitriy Muserskiy	29 October 1988	2.18 m (7 ft 2 in)	104 kg (229 lb)	375 cm (148 in)	30 cm (12 in)	(Japan) Santory
14	Yaroslav Podlesnykh	3 September 1994	1.98 m (6 ft 6 in)	89 kg (196 lb)	341 cm (134 in)	0 cm (0 in)	(Russia) Kuzbass
15	Victor Poletaev	27 July 1995	1.97 m (6 ft 6 in)	86 kg (190 lb)	360 cm (140 in)	10 cm (3.9 in)	(Russia) Kuzbass
16	Evgenii Andreev	6 January 1995	1.8 m (5 ft 11 in)	72 kg (159 lb)	305 cm (120 in)	0 cm (0 in)	(Russia) Gazprom-Ugra
17	Maxim Mikhaylov	19 March 1988	2.02 m (6 ft 8 in)	103 kg (227 lb)	345 cm (136 in)	19 cm (7.5 in)	(Russia) Zenit Kazan
18	Egor Kliuka	15 June 1995	2.09 m (6 ft 10 in)	93 kg (205 lb)	360 cm (140 in)	10 cm (3.9 in)	(Russia) Fakel
20	Ilyas Kurkaev	18 January 1994	2.07 m (6 ft 9 in)	95 kg (209 lb)	355 cm (140 in)	10 cm (3.9 in)	(Russia) Lokomotiv
22	Roman Martynyuk	13 April 1987	1.82 m (6 ft 0 in)	75 kg (165 lb)	320 cm (130 in)	0 cm (0 in)	(Russia) Lokomotiv
23	Roman Poroshin	28 August 1995	1.96 m (6 ft 5 in)	90 kg (200 lb)	332 cm (131 in)	0 cm (0 in)	(Russia) Belogorie
24	Igor Kobzar (C)	13 April 1991	1.98 m (6 ft 6 in)	86 kg (190 lb)	337 cm (133 in)	0 cm (0 in)	(Russia) Kuzbass
27	Valentin Golubev	3 May 1992	1.9 m (6 ft 3 in)	70 kg (150 lb)	310 cm (120 in)	8 cm (3.1 in)	(Russia) Belogorie
28	Kirill Klets	15 March 1998	2.02 m (6 ft 8 in)	92 kg (203 lb)	340 cm (130 in)	0 cm (0 in)	(Austria) Hypo Tirol
29	Kirill Ursov	13 February 1995	1.94 m (6 ft 4 in)	86 kg (190 lb)	335 cm (132 in)	0 cm (0 in)	(Russia) Gazprom-Yugra
44	Denis Zemchenok	11 August 1987	2.03 m (6 ft 8 in)	93 kg (205 lb)	350 cm (140 in)	0 cm (0 in)	(Russia) Belogorie

== Pool F ==
=== Argentina ===
The following is the Argentine roster in the 2019 Intercontinental Olympic Qualification Tournament.

Head Coach: Marcelo Mendez

No.	Name	Date of birth	Height	Weight	Spike	Block	2019 club
2	Federico Pereyra	19 June 1988	2 m (6 ft 7 in)	99 kg (218 lb)	335 cm (132 in)	9 cm (3.5 in)	(Belgium) Nolio Maaseik Club
3	Jan Martinez Franchi	28 January 1998	1.9 m (6 ft 3 in)	85 kg (187 lb)	333 cm (131 in)	0 cm (0 in)	(Argentina) BOLIVAR
5	Nicolas Uriarte	21 March 1990	1.92 m (6 ft 4 in)	87 kg (192 lb)	342 cm (135 in)	18 cm (7.1 in)	(Argentina) TAHUATE
6	Cristian Poglajen	14 July 1989	1.95 m (6 ft 5 in)	94 kg (207 lb)	342 cm (135 in)	0 cm (0 in)	(Italy) GS Porto Robur Costa SSD ARL
7	Facundo Conte	25 August 1989	1.97 m (6 ft 6 in)	88 kg (194 lb)	354 cm (139 in)	18 cm (7.1 in)	(Argentina) TAHUBATE
8	Agustin Loser	12 October 1997	1.93 m (6 ft 4 in)	77 kg (170 lb)	335 cm (132 in)	0 cm (0 in)	(Argentina) BOLIVAR
9	Santiago Danani	12 December 1995	1.76 m (5 ft 9 in)	77 kg (170 lb)	324 cm (128 in)	0 cm (0 in)	(Italy) PADOVA
10	Nicolas Bruno	24 February 1989	1.87 m (6 ft 2 in)	85 kg (187 lb)	338 cm (133 in)	0 cm (0 in)	(Turkey) Maliye Piyango
11	Sebastian Solé	12 June 1991	2 m (6 ft 7 in)	94 kg (207 lb)	362 cm (143 in)	18 cm (7.1 in)	(Italy) BluVolley Verona
12	Bruno Lima	4 February 1996	1.98 m (6 ft 6 in)	87 kg (192 lb)	345 cm (136 in)	0 cm (0 in)	(Germany) TV Buhl Volleybal
13	Ezequiel Palacios	2 October 1992	1.98 m (6 ft 6 in)	95 kg (209 lb)	345 cm (136 in)	0 cm (0 in)	(Italy) Top Volley SRL
14	Pablo Crer	12 June 1989	2.02 m (6 ft 8 in)	85 kg (187 lb)	357 cm (141 in)	9 cm (3.5 in)	(Argentina) Personal Bolivar
15	Luciano De Cecco (C)	2 June 1988	1.91 m (6 ft 3 in)	98 kg (216 lb)	332 cm (131 in)	18 cm (7.1 in)	(Italy) Sir Safety Perugia
16	Alexis Ruben Gonzalez	21 July 1981	1.84 m (6 ft 0 in)	85 kg (187 lb)	327 cm (129 in)	9 cm (3.5 in)	(Argentina) Personal Bolívar
17	Nicolas Mendez	2 November 1992	1.91 m (6 ft 3 in)	90 kg (200 lb)	340 cm (130 in)	7 cm (2.8 in)	(France) AJACCIO
18	Martin Ramos	26 August 1991	1.97 m (6 ft 6 in)	94 kg (207 lb)	348 cm (137 in)	9 cm (3.5 in)	(Argentina) UPCN San Juan Volley
19	Franco Massimino	23 May 1988	1.77 m (5 ft 10 in)	66 kg (146 lb)	310 cm (120 in)	0 cm (0 in)	(Argentina) OBRAS DE SAN JUAN
20	Facundo Santucci	6 March 1987	1.85 m (6 ft 1 in)	87 kg (192 lb)	322 cm (127 in)	0 cm (0 in)	(France) Toulouse Club
22	Lisandro Zanotti	4 October 1990	1.95 m (6 ft 5 in)	88 kg (194 lb)	336 cm (132 in)	0 cm (0 in)	(France) Narbone Volley
23	Joaquin Gallego	21 November 1996	2.04 m (6 ft 8 in)	102 kg (225 lb)	343 cm (135 in)	0 cm (0 in)	(Argentina) UNTREFF
24	German Johansen	2 September 1995	2 m (6 ft 7 in)	85 kg (187 lb)	351 cm (138 in)	8 cm (3.1 in)	(Argentina) Club De Amigos
25	Nicolás Lazo	16 April 1995	1.92 m (6 ft 4 in)	85 kg (187 lb)	340 cm (130 in)	0 cm (0 in)	(Argentina) UPCN San Juan Volley
27	Matias Giraudo	13 March 1998	1.96 m (6 ft 5 in)	85 kg (187 lb)	330 cm (130 in)	0 cm (0 in)	(Argentina) River Plate
29	Luciano Palonsky	8 July 1999	1.98 m (6 ft 6 in)	72 kg (159 lb)	330 cm (130 in)	0 cm (0 in)	(Argentina) Club Ciudad de Buenos Aires
30	Gaston Fernandez	4 August 1995	2.03 m (6 ft 8 in)	101 kg (223 lb)	339 cm (133 in)	8 cm (3.1 in)	(Argentina) Club Ciudad de Buenos Aires

=== Canada ===
The following is the Canadian roster in the 2019 Intercontinental Olympic Qualification Tournament.

Head Coach: Glenn Hoag

No.	Name	Date of birth	Height	Weight	Spike	Block	2019 club
1	TJ Sanders	14 December 1991	1.91 m (6 ft 3 in)	81 kg (179 lb)	326 cm (128 in)	17 cm (6.7 in)	Team Canada
2	John Gordon Perrin (C)	17 August 1989	2.01 m (6 ft 7 in)	95 kg (209 lb)	353 cm (139 in)	19 cm (7.5 in)	(Canada) Belogorie
3	Steven Marshall	23 November 1989	1.93 m (6 ft 4 in)	87 kg (192 lb)	350 cm (140 in)	8 cm (3.1 in)	(Turkey) Efeler Ligi club İnegöl Bld
4	Nicholas Hoag	19 August 1992	2 m (6 ft 7 in)	91 kg (201 lb)	342 cm (135 in)	16 cm (6.3 in)	(Italy) Sir Safety Perugia
5	Deanan Gyimah	16 January 1998	1.99 m (6 ft 6 in)	75 kg (165 lb)	372 cm (146 in)	0 cm (0 in)	Team Canada
6	Ryley Brendan Barnes	11 October 1993	2 m (6 ft 7 in)	92 kg (203 lb)	348 cm (137 in)	0 cm (0 in)	(Italy) Padova
7	Stephen Timothy Maar	6 December 1994	2.01 m (6 ft 7 in)	103 kg (227 lb)	350 cm (140 in)	8 cm (3.1 in)	(Italy) Power Volley Milano
8	Jay Blankenau	27 September 1989	1.94 m (6 ft 4 in)	94 kg (207 lb)	334 cm (131 in)	8 cm (3.1 in)	(Belgium) Nolika Masseik
9	Jason Derocco	19 September 1989	1.98 m (6 ft 6 in)	94 kg (207 lb)	342 cm (135 in)	0 cm (0 in)	(Japan) FC Tokyo
10	Sharone Vernon-Evans	28 August 1998	2.02 m (6 ft 8 in)	94 kg (207 lb)	374 cm (147 in)	8 cm (3.1 in)	(Poland) ONICO Warszawa
11	Daniel Jansen Vandoorn	21 March 1990	2.07 m (6 ft 9 in)	98 kg (216 lb)	351 cm (138 in)	8 cm (3.1 in)	(Canada) Valepa
12	Lucas Van Berkel	29 November 1991	2.1 m (6 ft 11 in)	108 kg (238 lb)	350 cm (140 in)	8 cm (3.1 in)	(Germany) United Volleys FRANKFURT
13	Byron Keturakis	11 January 1996	2 m (6 ft 7 in)	88 kg (194 lb)	348 cm (137 in)	0 cm (0 in)	(France) Narbonne
14	Eric Loeppky	1 August 1998	1.97 m (6 ft 6 in)	89 kg (196 lb)	348 cm (137 in)	0 cm (0 in)	Team Canada
15	Jeremy Alexander Davies	1 May 1994	1.72 m (5 ft 8 in)	72 kg (159 lb)	299 cm (118 in)	0 cm (0 in)	(Finland) Team Lakkapä
16	Ryan Joseph Sclater	10 February 1994	2 m (6 ft 7 in)	92 kg (203 lb)	347 cm (137 in)	8 cm (3.1 in)	(Germany) SVG Lüneburg
17	Graham Vigrass	17 June 1989	2.05 m (6 ft 9 in)	97 kg (214 lb)	354 cm (139 in)	13 cm (5.1 in)	(Poland) Onico Warszawa
18	Jordan Mcconkey	23 May 1994	2.02 m (6 ft 8 in)	94 kg (207 lb)	359 cm (141 in)	0 cm (0 in)	Team Canada
19	Blair Cameron Bann	26 February 1988	1.84 m (6 ft 0 in)	84 kg (185 lb)	314 cm (124 in)	8 cm (3.1 in)	(France) Chaumont V.C.
20	Arthur Szwarc	30 March 1995	2.09 m (6 ft 10 in)	99 kg (218 lb)	356 cm (140 in)	8 cm (3.1 in)	(France) Arago de Sete
21	Brett James Walsh	19 February 1994	1.95 m (6 ft 5 in)	84 kg (185 lb)	332 cm (131 in)	0 cm (0 in)	(Belgium) Knack Roeselare
22	Blake Scheerhoorn	6 January 1995	2.02 m (6 ft 8 in)	90 kg (200 lb)	359 cm (141 in)	0 cm (0 in)	(France) Nantes V.C.
23	Danny Demyanenko	13 July 1994	1.94 m (6 ft 4 in)	101 kg (223 lb)	357 cm (141 in)	6 cm (2.4 in)	(Canada) Toulouse
24	Adam Schriemer	17 August 1995	2 m (6 ft 7 in)	89 kg (196 lb)	350 cm (140 in)	0 cm (0 in)	(Germany) SVG Lüneburg
25	Brandon Koppers	9 September 1995	2 m (6 ft 7 in)	90 kg (200 lb)	345 cm (136 in)	0 cm (0 in)	(Canada) Zaks V.C.

=== China ===
The following is the Chinese roster in the 2019 Intercontinental Olympic Qualification Tournament.

Head Coach: Raúl Lozano

No.	Name	Date of birth	Height	Weight	Spike	Block	2019 club
1	Qingyao Dai	26 September 1991	2.05 m (6 ft 9 in)	100 kg (220 lb)	350 cm (140 in)	3 cm (1.2 in)	(China) Shanghai
2	Chuan Jiang	9 August 1994	2.05 m (6 ft 9 in)	91 kg (201 lb)	365 cm (144 in)	0 cm (0 in)	(China) Beijing
3	Tianyi Mao	2 June 1993	2 m (6 ft 7 in)	90 kg (200 lb)	350 cm (140 in)	0 cm (0 in)	(China) Bayi V.C.
4	Chengcheng Xiu	23 August 1999	2 m (6 ft 7 in)	92 kg (203 lb)	350 cm (140 in)	0 cm (0 in)	(China) Bayi V.C.
5	Binglong Zhang	11 September 1994	1.97 m (6 ft 6 in)	99 kg (218 lb)	355 cm (140 in)	0 cm (0 in)	(China) Beijing
6	Runming Li	1 March 1990	1.98 m (6 ft 6 in)	90 kg (200 lb)	355 cm (140 in)	11 cm (4.3 in)	(China) Shandong V.C.
7	Jingyi Wang	7 February 1998	2.02 m (6 ft 8 in)	87 kg (192 lb)	360 cm (140 in)	0 cm (0 in)	(China) Shandong V.C.
8	Jiahua Tong	13 December 1992	1.8 m (5 ft 11 in)	76 kg (168 lb)	330 cm (130 in)	0 cm (0 in)	(China) Shanghai
9	Yaochen Yu	19 August 1995	1.95 m (6 ft 5 in)	89 kg (196 lb)	347 cm (137 in)	0 cm (0 in)	(China) Jiangsu V.C.
10	Daoshuai Ji (C)	7 February 1992	1.94 m (6 ft 4 in)	82 kg (181 lb)	355 cm (140 in)	9 cm (3.5 in)	(China) Shandong V.C.
11	Haixiang Du	25 May 1995	1.94 m (6 ft 4 in)	87 kg (192 lb)	348 cm (137 in)	0 cm (0 in)	(China) Sichuan V.C.
12	Zhejia Zhang	31 August 1995	2.07 m (6 ft 9 in)	95 kg (209 lb)	365 cm (144 in)	0 cm (0 in)	(China) Shanghai
13	Longhai Chen	29 March 1991	2 m (6 ft 7 in)	85 kg (187 lb)	350 cm (140 in)	0 cm (0 in)	(China) Shanghai
15	Chuanhang Tang	4 October 1995	2.02 m (6 ft 8 in)	92 kg (203 lb)	350 cm (140 in)	0 cm (0 in)	(China) Bayi V.C.
16	Jiafeng Gu	27 September 1996	2.03 m (6 ft 8 in)	87 kg (192 lb)	355 cm (140 in)	0 cm (0 in)	(China) Beijing
17	Libin Liu	16 February 1995	1.97 m (6 ft 6 in)	90 kg (200 lb)	350 cm (140 in)	0 cm (0 in)	(China) Beijing
18	Shunxiang Guo	3 November 1997	1.95 m (6 ft 5 in)	91 kg (201 lb)	349 cm (137 in)	0 cm (0 in)	(China) Sichuan V.C.
19	Guojun Zhan	16 December 1988	1.97 m (6 ft 6 in)	85 kg (187 lb)	350 cm (140 in)	0 cm (0 in)	(China) Shanghai
20	Shuhan Rao	23 December 1996	2.05 m (6 ft 9 in)	99 kg (218 lb)	360 cm (140 in)	0 cm (0 in)	(China) Fujian V.C.
21	Ruantong Miao	21 May 1995	2.05 m (6 ft 9 in)	88 kg (194 lb)	354 cm (139 in)	0 cm (0 in)	(China) Hubei V.C.
22	Jingyin Zhang	20 December 1999	2.07 m (6 ft 9 in)	88 kg (194 lb)	357 cm (141 in)	0 cm (0 in)	(China) Zhejiang V.C.
23	Shikun Peng	26 August 2000	2.08 m (6 ft 10 in)	90 kg (200 lb)	340 cm (130 in)	0 cm (0 in)	(China) Sichuan V.C.
25	Jiajie Chen	17 September 1995	1.7 m (5 ft 7 in)	70 kg (150 lb)	325 cm (128 in)	0 cm (0 in)	(China) Guangdong V.C.
26	Dangyi Yuan	30 November 1996	2 m (6 ft 7 in)	91 kg (201 lb)	355 cm (140 in)	0 cm (0 in)	(China) Bayi V.C.
27	Xiaoteng Ma	19 June 1991	1.8 m (5 ft 11 in)	75 kg (165 lb)	330 cm (130 in)	0 cm (0 in)	(China) Bayi V.C.

=== Finland ===
The following is the Finnish roster in the 2019 Intercontinental Olympic Qualification Tournament.

Head Coach: Joel Banks

No.	Name	Date of birth	Height	Weight	Spike	Block	2019 club
1	Niko Haapakoski	1 May 1996	1.92 m (6 ft 4 in)	74 kg (163 lb)	325 cm (128 in)	0 cm (0 in)	(Finland) Lentopalloseura ETTA
2	Eemi Tervaportti (C)	26 July 1989	1.93 m (6 ft 4 in)	80 kg (180 lb)	338 cm (133 in)	15 cm (5.9 in)	(Greece) Olympiacos
4	Lauri Kerminen	18 January 1993	1.85 m (6 ft 1 in)	80 kg (180 lb)	332 cm (131 in)	15 cm (5.9 in)	(Russia) Kuzbass Kemerovo
5	Peetu Makinen	19 August 1995	2 m (6 ft 7 in)	90 kg (200 lb)	350 cm (140 in)	0 cm (0 in)	(Czech Republic) VK Pribram
6	Antti Ronkainen	11 August 1996	1.89 m (6 ft 2 in)	80 kg (180 lb)	330 cm (130 in)	6 cm (2.4 in)	(Germany) SVG Lüneburg
7	Niko Suihkonen	11 April 1999	1.9 m (6 ft 3 in)	86 kg (190 lb)	342 cm (135 in)	6 cm (2.4 in)	(Finland) VaLePa Sastamala Tampere
8	Elviss Krastins	15 September 1994	1.92 m (6 ft 4 in)	85 kg (187 lb)	340 cm (130 in)	6 cm (2.4 in)	(France) Arago de Sete
9	Tommi Siirilä	5 August 1993	2.03 m (6 ft 8 in)	102 kg (225 lb)	350 cm (140 in)	7 cm (2.8 in)	(Germany) Hypo Tirol AlpenVolleys Hachin
10	Urpo Hermanni Sivula	15 March 1988	1.95 m (6 ft 5 in)	100 kg (220 lb)	350 cm (140 in)	15 cm (5.9 in)	(Finland) VaLePa Sastamala Tampere
11	Sauli Severi Sinkkonen	14 September 1989	2.01 m (6 ft 7 in)	94 kg (207 lb)	345 cm (136 in)	6 cm (2.4 in)	(Romania) CS Volei Municipal Zalau
12	Samuli Ville Mikael Kaislasalo	3 August 1995	2.05 m (6 ft 9 in)	94 kg (207 lb)	350 cm (140 in)	6 cm (2.4 in)	(Belgium) Lindemans Aalst
14	Markus Reko Juhani Kaurto	31 August 1993	1.96 m (6 ft 5 in)	85 kg (187 lb)	345 cm (136 in)	6 cm (2.4 in)	(Finland) VaLePa Sastamala Tampere
15	Henrik Martin Johannes Porkka	14 January 1998	2.02 m (6 ft 8 in)	82 kg (181 lb)	360 cm (140 in)	6 cm (2.4 in)	(Finland) Hurrikaani Loimaa
16	Olli-Pekka Ojansivu	31 December 1987	1.97 m (6 ft 6 in)	90 kg (200 lb)	344 cm (135 in)	9 cm (3.5 in)	(Finland) Savo Volley
19	Niklas Aleksi Breilin	8 September 1999	1.78 m (5 ft 10 in)	69 kg (152 lb)	320 cm (130 in)	6 cm (2.4 in)	(Finland) Kokkolan Tiikerit
20	Joonas Mikael Jokela	12 December 1998	2.02 m (6 ft 8 in)	90 kg (200 lb)	345 cm (136 in)	0 cm (0 in)	(Switzerland) Lausanne UC
21	Fedor Ivanov	1 December 2000	1.93 m (6 ft 4 in)	78 kg (172 lb)	340 cm (130 in)	0 cm (0 in)	(Finland) Savo Volley
