= Igor Juričić =

Croatian volleyball player and coach

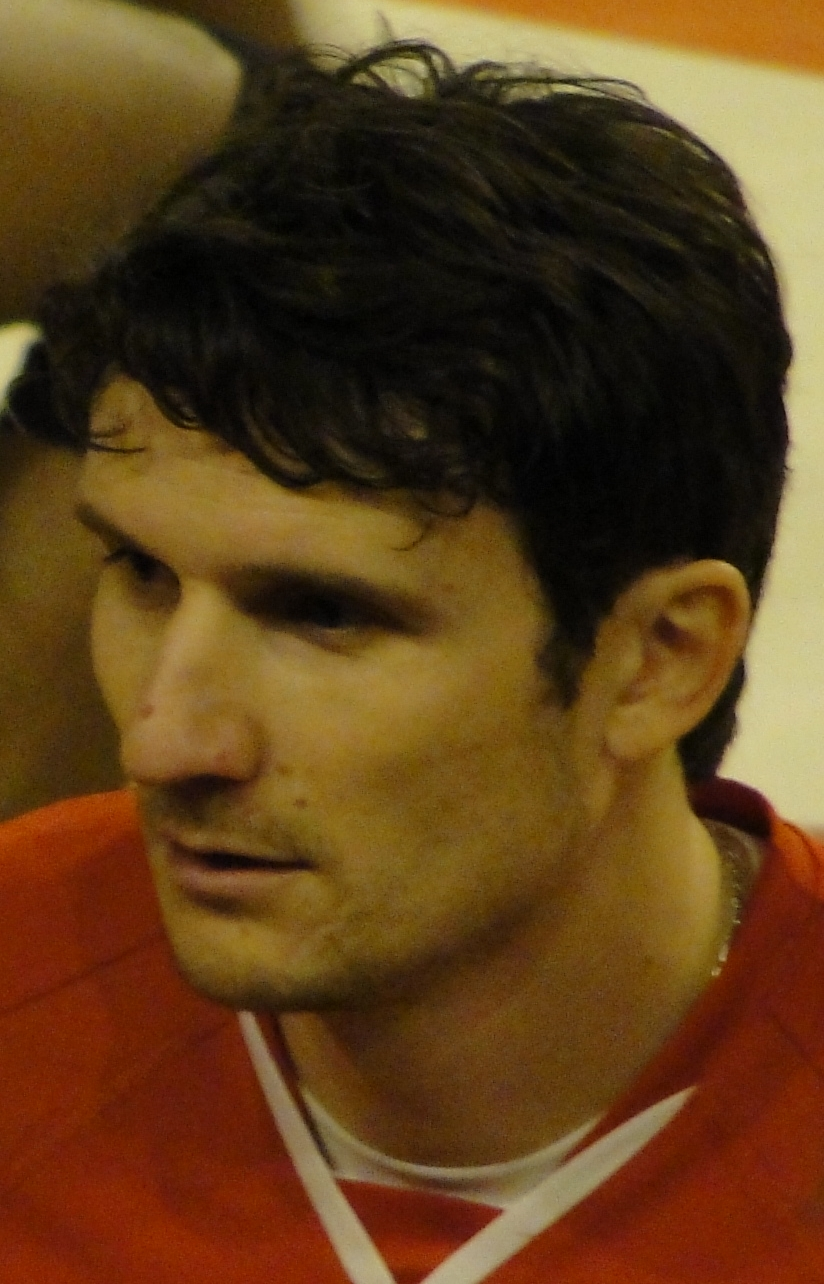

Personal information
- Born: 7 November 1974 (age 51); Rijeka, SR Croatia, SFR Yugoslavia
- Height: 2.02 m (6 ft 8 in)

Coaching information
Previous teams coached
| Years | Teams |
|---|---|
| 2013–2015; 2015–2016; 2016–2020; 2020; 2020–2021; 2021–2022; 2022–2024; 2024 | Harnes VB; Volley Menen; Tourcoing LM; Belogorie Belgorod; Foinikas Syros; Kuzbass Kemerovo; Trefl Gdańsk; Croatia |

Volleyball information
- Position: Middle blocker

National team
| Croatia (140) |
Honours
Men's volleyball
Head coach Croatia
European League
| Silver medal – second place | 2024 Osijek |

Igor Juričić (born 7 November 1974) is a Croatian professional volleyball coach and former player.

== Honours ==
=== As a player ===
- Domestic
  - 1995–96 Croatian Cup, with Mladost Zagreb
  - 1995–96 Croatian Championship, with Mladost Zagreb
  - 1996–97 Croatian Cup, with Mladost Zagreb
  - 1996–97 Croatian Championship, with Mladost Zagreb
  - 1997–98 Croatian Cup, with Mladost Zagreb
  - 1997–98 Croatian Championship, with Mladost Zagreb
  - 1998–99 Croatian Cup, with Mladost Zagreb
  - 1998–99 Croatian Championship, with Mladost Zagreb
  - 2000–01 Austrian Cup, with Hotvolleys Vienna
  - 2000–01 Austrian Championship, with Hotvolleys Vienna

=== As a coach ===
- Domestic
  - 2017–18 French Cup, with Tourcoing LM
  - 2020–21 Greek League Cup, with Foinikas Syros
  - 2020–21 Greek Championship, with Foinikas Syros
