= Obmochaev =

Obmochaev or Obmochayev (Russian: Обмочаев) is a Russian masculine surname, its feminine counterpart is Obmochaeva or Obmochayeva. It may refer to

- Aleksey Obmochaev (born 1989), Russian volleyball player
- Nataliya Obmochaeva (born 1989), Russian volleyball player, former wife of Aleksey
