= VC Kuzbass Kemerovo =

Russian football club

Kuzbass Kemerovo
- Full name: Volleyball Club Kuzbass Kemerovo
- Founded: 2008
- Ground: Spart Hall Arena, Kemerovo (Capacity: 2000)
- Chairman: Valentin Mazikin
- Manager: Alexey Babeshin
- Captain: Mikhail Scherbakov
- League: Super League
- 2022/23: 9th
- Website: Club home page

Uniforms
Home	Away

Kuzbass Kemerovo (Russian: Кузбасс Кемерово) is a Russian professional men's volleyball team, based in Kemerovo, playing in Super League since 2010.

== Achievements ==
Domestic competitions

- Russian Super League

Winners (1): 2019
3rd place (1): 2020

- Russian Cup

Runners-up (2): 2011, 2017

- Russian Super Cup

Winners (1): 2019

== Team roster ==
Team roster – season 2021/2022

No.	Name	Date of birth	Position
1	(Russia) Aleksey Obmochaev	May 22, 1989 (age 36)	libero
3	(Russia) Anton Karpukhov	April 23, 1988 (age 37)	outside hitter
5	(Russia) Vladimir Sieemshchikov	August 31, 1987 (age 38)	middle blocker
6	(Russia) Evgeny Sivozhelez	August 6, 1986 (age 39)	outside hitter
7	(Serbia) Petar Krsmanović	June 1, 1990 (age 35)	middle blocker
8	(Russia) Roman Pakshin	April 17, 1998 (age 27)	outside hitter
9	(Russia) Vitaly Papazov	April 6, 1992 (age 33)	opposite
10	(Russia) Alexandr Markin	July 28, 1990 (age 35)	outside hitter
11	(Russia) Egor Krechetov	August 17, 1999 (age 26)	setter
12	(Russia) Mikhail Shcherbakov (C)	July 13, 1985 (age 40)	middle blocker
15	(Russia) Inal Tavasiev	March 28, 1989 (age 36)	middle blocker
21	(Russia) Alexander Butko	March 18, 1986 (age 39)	setter
22	(Russia) Alexander Moiseev	June 22, 1995 (age 30)	libero
Head coach: (Croatia) Igor Juričić

Team roster – season 2020/2021
VC Kuzbass Kemerovo
No.	Name	Date of birth	Position
1	(Russia) Aleksey Obmochaev	May 22, 1989 (age 36)	libero
2	(Russia) Ivan Demakov	January 6, 1993 (age 32)	middle blocker
3	(Russia) Anton Karpukhov	April 23, 1988 (age 37)	outside hitter
4	(Russia) Igor Kobzar (C)	April 13, 1991 (age 34)	setter
5	(Russia) Vladimir Shishkin	February 2, 1990 (age 35)	libero
6	(Russia) Evgeny Sivozhelez	August 6, 1986 (age 39)	outside hitter
7	(Serbia) Petar Krsmanović	June 1, 1990 (age 35)	middle blocker
8	(Russia) Roman Pakshin	April 17, 1998 (age 27)	outside hitter
9	(Italy) Ivan Zaytsev	October 2, 1988 (age 37)	opposite
11	(Russia) Egor Krechetov	August 17, 1999 (age 26)	setter
12	(Russia) Mikhail Shcherbakov	July 13, 1985 (age 40)	middle blocker
13	(Russia) Bogdan Glivenko	January 26, 1992 (age 33)	opposite
15	(Russia) Inal Tavasiev	March 28, 1989 (age 36)	middle blocker
22	(Russia) Alexandr Markin	July 28, 1990 (age 35)	outside hitter
Head coach: (Russia) Aleksey Verbov

== Notable players ==
Notable, former or current players of club, who are medalist of intercontinental tournaments in national teams or clubs.

- (France) Samuel Tuia
- (France) Earvin N'Gapeth
- (Italy) Ivan Zaytsev (volleyball)
- (Serbia) Petar Krsmanović
- (Russia) Aleksey Obmochaev
- (Russia) Igor Kobzar
- (Russia) Evgeny Sivozhelez
- (Russia) Viktor Poletaev
- (Russia) Dmitry Ilinikh
- (Russia) Maksim Zhigalov
- (Russia) Konstantin Ushakov
