= Igor Kobzar =

Russian volleyball player (born 1991)

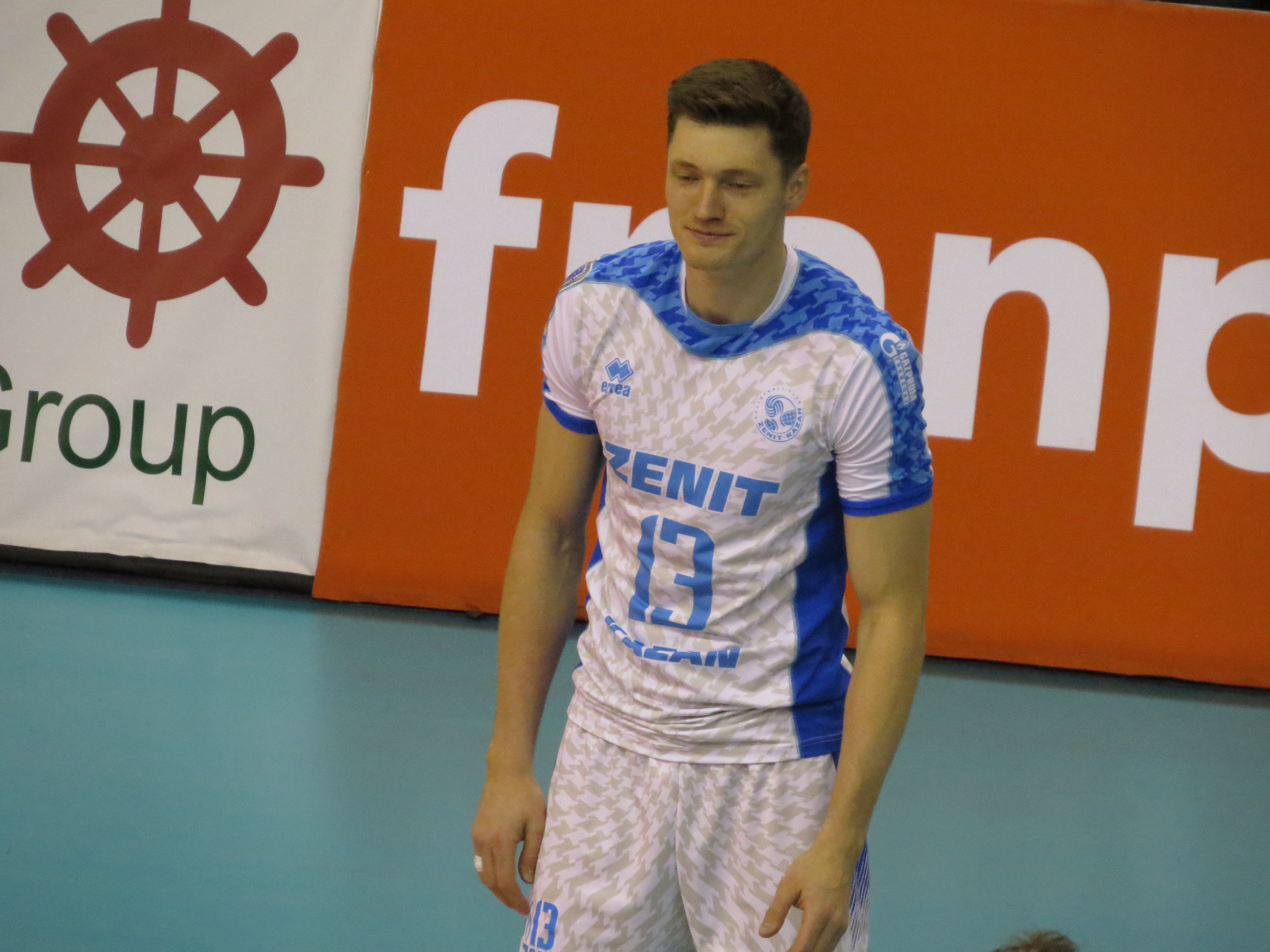
- Kobzar in 2017

Personal information
- Full name: Igor Andreyevich Kobzar
- Nationality: (Russia) Russian
- Born: 13 April 1991 (age 35); Bishkek, Kyrgyzstan
- Hometown: Surgut, Russia
- Height: 1.96 m (6 ft 5 in)
- Weight: 86 kg (190 lb)
- Spike: 340 cm (134 in)
- Block: 330 cm (130 in)

Volleyball information
- Position: Setter
- Current club: (Russia) Zenit Saint Petersburg
- Number: 4

Career
Years	Teams
2007–2012; 2012–2013; 2013–2017; 2017–2021; 2021–	Gazprom-Ugra Surgut; Belogorie Belgorod; Zenit Kazan; Kuzbass Kemerovo; Zenit Saint Petersburg

National team
2013–	Russia
Honours
Volleyball
Representing ROC
Olympic Games
Silver medal – second place	2020 Tokyo	Team
Representing Russia
FIVB Nations League
Gold medal – first place	2018 Lille	Team
Gold medal – first place	2019 Chicago	Team
European Games
Bronze medal – third place	2015 Azerbaijan	Team
European Youth Championship
Gold medal – first place	2009 Netherlands	Under-19

Igor Andreyevich Kobzar (Russian: Игорь Андреевич Кобзарь, IPA: [ˈiɡərʲ ˈkobzərʲ]) (born 13 April 1991) is a Kirgiz-born Russian volleyball player.

== Sporting achievements ==
=== Clubs ===
- CEV Champions League
  - 2014/2015 – with Zenit Kazan
  - 2015/2016 – with Zenit Kazan
  - 2016/2017 – with Zenit Kazan
- FIVB Club World Championship
  - Betim 2015 – with Zenit Kazan
  - Betim 2016 – with Zenit Kazan
- National championships
  - 2012/2013 Russian Cup, with Belogorie Belgorod
  - 2012/2013 Russian Championship, with Belogorie Belgorod
  - 2013/2014 Russian Championship, with Zenit Kazan
  - 2014/2015 Russian Cup, with Zenit Kazan
  - 2014/2015 Russian Championship, with Zenit Kazan
  - 2015/2016 Russian SuperCup, with Zenit Kazan
  - 2015/2016 Russian Cup, with Zenit Kazan
  - 2015/2016 Russian Championship, with Zenit Kazan
  - 2016/2017 Russian SuperCup, with Zenit Kazan
  - 2016/2017 Russian Cup, with Zenit Kazan
  - 2016/2017 Russian Championship, with Zenit Kazan
  - 2018/2019 Russian Championship, with Kuzbass Kemerovo
  - 2019/2020 Russian SuperCup, with Kuzbass Kemerovo
