= Petar Krsmanović =

Serbian volleyball player (born 1990)

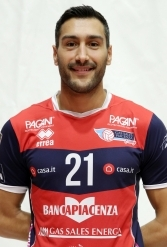
- Krsmanović in 2019

Personal information
- Born: 1 June 1990 (age 36); Čačak, SR Serbia, SFR Yugoslavia
- Height: 2.05 m (6 ft 9 in)
- Weight: 101 kg (223 lb)
- Spike: 354 cm (139 in)
- Block: 349 cm (137 in)

Volleyball information
- Position: Middle blocker
- Current club: Ural Ufa

Career
Years	Teams
2010–2011; 2011–2014; 2014–2015; 2015–2016; 2016–2019; 2019–2020; 2020–2022; 2022–2023; 2023–2024; 2024–	OK Takovo; OK Djerdap; Budvanska Rivijera Budva; UPCN Vóley Club; Gazprom-Ugra Surgut; Gas Sales Piacenza; Kuzbass Kemerovo; OK Vojvodina; Gazprom-Ugra Surgut; Ural Ufa

National team
2015–	Serbia
Honours
Men's volleyball
Representing Serbia
CEV European Championship
Gold medal – first place	2019 Belgium/France/Netherlands/Slovenia

Petar Krsmanović (Serbian Cyrillic: Петар Крсмановић; born 1 June 1990) is a Serbian professional volleyball player who plays as a middle blocker for Ural Ufa and the Serbia national team.

== Honours ==
=== Club ===
- Domestic
  - 2014–15 Montenegrin Cup, with Budućnost Podgorica
  - 2014–15 Montenegrin Championship, with Budućnost Podgorica
  - 2015–16 Argentine Cup, with UPCN Vóley Club
  - 2015–16 Argentine Championship, with UPCN Vóley Club
