= 2018–19 Baltic Men Volleyball League =

- League: Baltic Men Volleyball League
- Sport: Volleyball
- Duration: 29 September 2018 – 2 March 2019
- Season champions: (Estonia) Bigbank Tartu

Finals
- Champions: (Estonia) Bigbank Tartu
- Runners-up: (Estonia) Saaremaa
- Finals MVP: (Estonia) Hindrek Pulk (Bigbank Tartu)

Baltic Volleyball League seasons
- ← 2017–18 2019–20 →

The 2018–19 Baltic Men Volleyball League, known as Credit 24 Champions League for sponsorship reasons, was the 14th edition of the highest level of club volleyball in the Baltic states.

== Participating teams ==
Location of 2018–19 Baltic Men Volleyball League teams.

The following teams took part in the 2018–19 edition of Baltic Men Volleyball League.

=== Venues and personnel ===
Team	Location	Arena	Head Coach	Captain
(Estonia) Bigbank Tartu	Tartu	University of Tartu Sports Hall	(Estonia) Andrei Ojamets	(Estonia) Meelis Kivisild
(Estonia) Pärnu	Pärnu	Pärnu Sports Hall	(Estonia) Avo Keel	(Estonia) Martti Keel
(Estonia) Rakvere	Rakvere	Rakvere Sports Hall	(Estonia) Andres Toode	(Estonia) Ronald Järv
(Estonia) Saaremaa	Kuressaare	Kuressaare Sports Centre	(Estonia) Urmas Tali	(Estonia) Siim Põlluäär
(Estonia) Selver Tallinn	Tallinn	Audentes Sports Centre	(Finland) Aapo Rantanen	(Estonia) Renet Vanker
(Estonia) TalTech	Tallinn	TalTech Sports Hall	(Estonia) Janis Sirelpuu	(Estonia) Mihkel Nuut
(Latvia) Biolars/Jelgava	Jelgava	Zemgale Olympic Center	(Latvia) Jurijs Deveikus	(Latvia) Aivis Abolins
(Latvia) Daugavpils Universitāte	Daugavpils	Daugavpils Olympic Center	(Latvia) Edgars Savickis	(Latvia) Dmitrijs Lavrenovs
(Latvia) Jēkabpils Lūši	Jēkabpils	Jēkabpils Sporta nams	(Latvia) Mārcis Obrumans	(Latvia) Rihards Pukitis
(Latvia) OC Limbaži/MSG	Limbaži	Limbaži 3rd Secondary School	(Latvia) Lauris Iecelnieks	(Latvia) Kristaps Smits
(Latvia) RTU/Robežsardze	Riga	Vamoic Sports Hall	(Latvia) Raimonds Vilde	(Latvia) Gatis Garklavs

== Main Tournament ==
All participating 11 clubs were playing according to the double round robin system.

Pos	Team	Pld	W	L	Pts	SW	SL	SR	SPW	SPL	SPR	Qualification
1	(Estonia) Bigbank Tartu	20	17	3	50	54	18	3.000	1738	1497	1.161	Qualified for Playoffs
2	(Estonia) Saaremaa	20	16	4	48	52	18	2.889	1664	1419	1.173	Qualified for Playoffs
3	(Latvia) RTU/Robežsardze	20	15	5	45	51	25	2.040	1780	1588	1.121	Qualified for Playoffs
4	(Estonia) Pärnu	20	14	6	41	47	29	1.621	1751	1615	1.084	Qualified for Playoffs
5	(Estonia) Selver Tallinn	20	10	10	32	42	38	1.105	1757	1758	0.999	Qualified for Playoffs
6	(Estonia) Rakvere	20	11	9	31	37	35	1.057	1649	1595	1.034	Qualified for Playoffs
7	(Latvia) Jēkabpils Lūši	20	11	9	31	39	39	1.000	1761	1720	1.024	Qualified for Playoffs
8	(Estonia) TalTech	20	6	14	19	30	47	0.638	1626	1732	0.939	Qualified for Playoffs
9	(Latvia) Daugavpils Universitāte	20	5	15	13	22	52	0.423	1490	1746	0.853	
10	(Latvia) OC Limbaži/MSG	20	4	16	13	17	49	0.347	1372	1572	0.873	
11	(Latvia) Biolars/Jelgava	20	1	19	7	16	57	0.281	1411	1757	0.803	

Updated to match(es) played on 17 February 2019. Source: Credit24 Champions League Regular Season

== Playoffs ==
The four winners of each series qualified to the Final Four, while the other four teams were eliminated.

Team 1	Agg.	Team 2	Game 1	Game 2	Game 3
Bigbank Tartu (Estonia)	6–0	(Estonia) TalTech	3–0	3–0	
Saaremaa (Estonia)	6–3	(Latvia) Jēkabpils Lūši	1–3	3–0	3–1
RTU/Robežsardze (Latvia)	6–3	(Estonia) Rakvere	0–3	3–1	3–1
Pärnu (Estonia)	6–0	(Estonia) Selver Tallinn	3–1	3–0	

== Final four ==
- Organizer: Bigbank Tartu
- Venue: University of Tartu Sports Hall, Tartu, Estonia

Semifinals
1 March
(Estonia) Saaremaa	3
(Latvia) RTU/Robežsardze	1
1 March
(Estonia) Bigbank Tartu	3
(Estonia) Pärnu	0

Final
2 March
(Estonia) Saaremaa	2
(Estonia) Bigbank Tartu	3
3rd place match
2 March
(Latvia) RTU/Robežsardze	0
(Estonia) Pärnu	3

=== Semifinals ===
Date	Time		Score		Set 1	Set 2	Set 3	Set 4	Set 5	Total	Report
1 Mar	17:00	Saaremaa (Estonia)	3–1	(Latvia) RTU/Robežsardze	34–32	25–19	20–25	25–22		104–98	
1 Mar	20:00	Bigbank Tartu (Estonia)	3–0	(Estonia) Pärnu	25–19	25–22	25–21			75–62	

=== 3rd place match ===
Date	Time		Score		Set 1	Set 2	Set 3	Set 4	Set 5	Total	Report
2 Mar	14:00	Pärnu (Estonia)	3–0	(Latvia) RTU/Robežsardze	25–23	27–25	25–21			77–69	

=== Final ===
Date	Time		Score		Set 1	Set 2	Set 3	Set 4	Set 5	Total	Report
2 Mar	17:00	Bigbank Tartu (Estonia)	3–2	(Estonia) Saaremaa	21–25	25–22	25–19	19–25	19–17	109–108	

== Final ranking ==
Rank	Team
1st place, gold medalist(s)	(Estonia) Bigbank Tartu
2nd place, silver medalist(s)	(Estonia) Saaremaa
3rd place, bronze medalist(s)	(Estonia) Pärnu
4	(Latvia) RTU/Robežsardze
5	(Estonia) Selver Tallinn
6	(Estonia) Rakvere
7	(Latvia) Jēkabpils Lūši
8	(Estonia) TalTech
9	(Latvia) Daugavpils Universitāte
10	(Latvia) OC Limbaži/MSG
11	(Latvia) Biolars/Jelgava

2018–19 Baltic Men Volleyball League Champions

3rd title

14–man Roster for Final Four
Rait Rikberg, (c) Meelis Kivisild, Samuel Joseph Walker, Hindrek Pulk, Dmytro Shlomin, Kevin Soo, Hergo Hansman, Maksim Sevtsenko, Stefan Kaibald, Siim Tammearu, Jan Helenius, Märt Tammearu, Alex Saaremaa, Mart Naaber
Head coach
Andrei Ojamets

== Final four awards ==
- Most valuable player
  (Estonia) Hindrek Pulk (Bigbank Tartu)
- Best setter
  (Latvia) Artis Caics (Saaremaa)
- Best Outside Hitters
  (Ukraine) Illia Kovalov (Pärnu)
  (Latvia) Aleksandrs Avdejevs (RTU/Robežsardze)
- Best Middle Blockers
  (Estonia) Meelis Kivivild (Bigbank Tartu)
  (Estonia) Harri Palmar (Saaremaa)
- Best Opposite Hitter
  (Estonia) Siim Põlluäär (Saaremaa)
- Best libero
  (Estonia) Rait Rikberg (Bigbank Tartu)
