= 2019–20 Baltic Men Volleyball League =

- League: Baltic Men Volleyball League
- Sport: Volleyball
- Duration: 2 October 2019 – 8 March 2020
- Season champions: (Estonia) Saaremaa

Finals
- Champions: Not played
- Runners-up: Not played
- Finals MVP: Not awarded

Baltic Volleyball League seasons
- ← 2018–19 2020–21 →

The 2019–20 Baltic Men Volleyball League, known as Credit 24 Champions League for sponsorship reasons, was the 15th edition of the highest level of club volleyball in the Baltic states. The season was cancelled after the quarterfinals in the beginning of March 2020 due to the COVID-19 pandemic. Final four games were not played and medals were not awarded to the top teams.

== Participating teams ==
Location of 2019–20 Baltic Men Volleyball League teams.

The following teams took part in the 2019–20 edition of Baltic Men Volleyball League.

=== Venues, personnel and kits ===
Team	Location	Arena	Head Coach	Captain	Kit manufacturer	Shirt sponsor
(Estonia) Bigbank Tartu	Tartu	University of Tartu Sports Hall	(Estonia) Andrei Ojamets	(Estonia) Kert Toobal	Joma	Bigbank
(Estonia) Pärnu	Pärnu	Pärnu Sports Hall	(Estonia) Avo Keel	(Estonia) Martti Keel	Teamshield	Unibet
(Estonia) Saaremaa	Kuressaare	Kuressaare Sports Centre	(Greece) Ioannis Kalmazidis	(Brazil) Daniel Maciel	Macron	Visit Saaremaa
(Estonia) Selver Tallinn	Tallinn	Audentes Sports Centre	(Italy) Alessandro Piroli	(Estonia) Karli Allik	Erreà	Selver
(Estonia) TalTech	Tallinn	TalTech Sports Hall	(Estonia) Janis Sirelpuu	(Estonia) Mihkel Nuut	Macron	Tallinn University of Technology
(Latvia) Biolars/Jelgava	Jelgava	Zemgale Olympic Center	(Latvia) Austris Štāls	(Latvia) Aleksandrs Kudrjašovs	Joma	Jelgava
(Latvia) Jēkabpils Lūši	Jēkabpils	Jēkabpils Sporta nams	(Latvia) Mārcis Obrumans	(Latvia) Rihards Pukitis	Macron	Optibet
(Latvia) OC Limbaži/MSG	Limbaži	Limbaži 3rd Secondary School	(Latvia) Lauris Iecelnieks	(Latvia) Jānis Jansons	Macron	Limbaži
(Latvia) RTU/Robežsardze	Riga	Mežaparks Sporta centrs	(Latvia) Raimonds Vilde	(Latvia) Andrejs Zavorotnijs	Erreà	Riga Technical University

=== Coaching changes ===
Team	Outgoing coach	Manner of departure	Date of vacancy	Position in table	Incoming coach	Date of appointment
Selver Tallinn	(Finland) Aapo Rantanen	Mutual consent	23 May 2019	Pre-season	(Italy) Alessandro Piroli	11 July 2019
Biolars/Jelgava	(Latvia) Jurijs Deveikus	Mutual consent	2019	Pre-season	(Latvia) Austris Štāls	2019
Saaremaa	(Estonia) Urmas Tali	Sacked	31 December 2019	2nd	(Greece) Ioannis Kalmazidis	2 January 2020

== Regular season ==
All participating 9 clubs are playing according to the triple round robin system.

Pos	Team	Pld	W	L	Pts	SW	SL	SR	SPW	SPL	SPR	Qualification
1	(Estonia) Saaremaa	24	22	2	62	69	19	3.632	2082	1676	1.242	Qualified for Playoffs
2	(Estonia) Bigbank Tartu	24	21	3	61	66	20	3.300	2011	1693	1.188	Qualified for Playoffs
3	(Estonia) Selver Tallinn	24	16	8	49	57	38	1.500	2140	2017	1.061	Qualified for Playoffs
4	(Latvia) Jēkabpils Lūši	24	13	11	42	55	44	1.250	2177	2155	1.010	Qualified for Playoffs
5	(Estonia) Pärnu	24	12	12	36	46	46	1.000	2005	2037	0.984	Qualified for Playoffs
6	(Latvia) RTU/Robežsardze	24	9	15	26	39	55	0.709	2019	2111	0.956	Qualified for Playoffs
7	(Estonia) TalTech	24	7	17	20	30	58	0.517	1863	2051	0.908	Qualified for Playoffs
8	(Latvia) Biolars/Jelgava	24	5	19	17	29	64	0.453	1845	2129	0.867	Qualified for Playoffs
9	(Latvia) OC Limbaži/MSG	24	3	21	11	20	67	0.299	1743	2016	0.865	

Updated to match(es) played on 23 February 2020. Source: Credit24 Champions League Regular Season

== Playoffs ==
The four winners of each series qualified to the Final four, while the other four teams were eliminated.

Team 1	Agg.	Team 2	Game 1	Game 2	Game 3
Saaremaa (Estonia)	6–0	(Latvia) Biolars/Jelgava	3–0	3–0	
Bigbank Tartu (Estonia)	6–3	(Estonia) TalTech	1–3	3–1	3–1
Selver Tallinn (Estonia)	5–1	(Latvia) RTU/Robežsardze	3–1	3–2	
Jēkabpils Lūši (Latvia)	6–0	(Estonia) Pärnu	3–0	3–1	

== Final four ==
The Final four tournament was scheduled to be held at Kuressaare Sports Centre, Kuressaare, Estonia on 13 – 14 March 2020. The tournament was initially postponed due to escalation of the COVID-19 pandemic in Europe. A few days later it was announced that the season was cancelled after the quarterfinals due to the COVID-19 pandemic. Final four games were not played and medals were not awarded to the top teams.

- Organizer: cancelled
- Venue: cancelled

Semifinals
cancelled
(Estonia) Bigbank Tartu
(Estonia) Selver Tallinn
cancelled
(Estonia) Saaremaa
(Latvia) Jēkabpils Lūši

Final
cancelled
–
–
3rd place match
cancelled
–
–

=== Semifinals ===
Date	Time		Score		Set 1	Set 2	Set 3	Set 4	Set 5	Total	Report
cancelled		Bigbank Tartu (Estonia)	CNX	(Estonia) Selver Tallinn							
cancelled		Saaremaa (Estonia)	CNX	(Latvia) Jēkabpils Lūši							

=== 3rd place match ===
Date	Time		Score		Set 1	Set 2	Set 3	Set 4	Set 5	Total	Report
cancelled		–	CNX	–							

=== Final ===
Date	Time		Score		Set 1	Set 2	Set 3	Set 4	Set 5	Total	Report
cancelled		–	CNX	–							

== Final ranking ==
~~Rank~~	~~Team~~
1st place, gold medalist(s)	
2nd place, silver medalist(s)	
3rd place, bronze medalist(s)	
4	
5	
6	
7	
8	
9	

~~2019–20 Baltic Men Volleyball League Champions~~

~~14–man Roster for Final Four~~

~~Head coach~~

== Final four awards ==
- ~~Most valuable player~~
- ~~Best setter~~
- ~~Best outside hitters~~
- ~~Best middle blockers~~
- ~~Best opposite hitter~~
- ~~Best libero~~
