= 2017–18 Baltic Men Volleyball League =

- League: Baltic Men Volleyball League
- Sport: Volleyball
- Duration: 30 September 2017 – 24 March 2018
- Season champions: (Estonia) Saaremaa

Finals
- Champions: (Estonia) Saaremaa
- Runners-up: (Estonia) Pärnu
- Finals MVP: (Estonia) Hindrek Pulk (Saaremaa)

Baltic Volleyball League seasons
- ← 2016–17 2018–19 →

The 2017–18 Baltic Men Volleyball League, known as Credit 24 Champions League for sponsorship reasons, was the 13th edition of the highest level of club volleyball in the Baltic states. Saaremaa, a new team formed in 2017, won on their debut as they defeated Pärnu in the final with the score 3–2.

== Participating teams ==
Location of 2017–18 Baltic Men Volleyball League teams.

The following teams took part in the 2017–18 edition of Baltic Men Volleyball League.

=== Venues and personnel ===
Team	Location	Arena	Head Coach
(Estonia) Bigbank Tartu	Tartu	University of Tartu Sports Hall	(Estonia) Oliver Lüütsepp
(Estonia) Järvamaa	Paide	E-Piim Sports Hall	(Estonia) Laimons Raudsepp
(Estonia) Pärnu	Pärnu	Pärnu Sports Hall	(Estonia) Avo Keel
(Estonia) Rakvere	Rakvere	Rakvere Sports Hall	(Estonia) Andres Toode
(Estonia) Saaremaa	Kuressaare	Kuressaare Sports Centre	(Estonia) Urmas Tali
(Estonia) Selver Tallinn	Tallinn	Audentes Sports Centre	(Latvia) Austris Štāls
(Estonia) TTÜ	Tallinn	TTÜ Sports Hall	(Estonia) Janis Sirelpuu
(Latvia) Biolars/Jelgava	Jelgava	Zemgale Olympic Center	(Latvia) Jurijs Deveikus
(Latvia) Daugavpils Universitāte	Daugavpils	Daugavpils Olympic Center	(Latvia) Edgars Savickis
(Latvia) Jēkabpils Lūši	Jēkabpils	Jēkabpils Sporta nams	(Latvia) Mārcis Obrumans
(Latvia) OC Limbaži/MSG	Limbaži	Limbaži 3rd Secondary School	(Latvia) Lauris Iecelnieks
(Latvia) RTU/Robežsardze	Riga	Vamoic Sports Hall	(Latvia) Raimonds Vilde
(Lithuania) Elga Master Idea SM Dubysa	Šiauliai		(Lithuania) Aivaras Strockis
(Lithuania) Raseiniai Norvelita	Raseiniai		(Lithuania) Robertas Nekrašas

== Main Tournament ==
All participating 14 clubs were playing according to the double round robin system.

Pos	Team	Pld	W	L	Pts	SW	SL	SR	SPW	SPL	SPR	Qualification
1	(Estonia) Saaremaa	26	24	2	69	75	20	3.750	2186	1823	1.199	Qualified for Playoffs
2	(Estonia) Pärnu	26	23	3	68	72	20	3.600	2140	1785	1.199	Qualified for Playoffs
3	(Estonia) Bigbank Tartu	26	20	6	63	69	24	2.875	1997	1746	1.144	Qualified for Playoffs
4	(Latvia) Jēkabpils Lūši	26	18	8	56	65	36	1.806	2249	2080	1.081	Qualified for Playoffs
5	(Estonia) Selver Tallinn	26	18	8	53	64	40	1.600	2298	2101	1.094	Qualified for Playoffs
6	(Estonia) Rakvere	26	17	9	48	57	41	1.390	2125	2063	1.030	Qualified for Playoffs
7	(Latvia) RTU/Robežsardze	26	14	12	40	49	46	1.065	2029	2079	0.976	Qualified for Playoffs
8	(Latvia) Biolars/Jelgava	26	12	14	36	46	50	0.920	2089	2084	1.002	Qualified for Playoffs
9	(Lithuania) Raseiniai Norvelita	26	9	17	28	43	61	0.705	2114	2196	0.963	
10	(Estonia) Järvamaa	26	9	17	25	35	65	0.538	2016	2143	0.941	
11	(Estonia) TTÜ	26	6	20	18	27	62	0.435	1870	2098	0.891	
12	(Latvia) Daugavpils Universitāte	26	5	21	16	29	69	0.420	1979	2310	0.857	
13	(Lithuania) Elga Master Idea SM Dubysa	26	5	21	14	26	71	0.366	1974	2255	0.875	
14	(Latvia) OC Limbaži/MSG	26	2	24	12	23	74	0.311	1568	1871	0.838	

Updated to match(es) played on 11 March 2018. Source: Credit24 Champions League

== Playoffs ==
The four winners of each series qualified to the Final Four, while the other four teams were eliminated.

Team 1	Agg.	Team 2	Game 1	Game 2	Game 3
Saaremaa (Estonia)	6–0	(Latvia) Biolars/Jelgava	3–0	3–0	
Pärnu (Estonia)	6–0	(Latvia) RTU/Robežsardze	3–1	3–0	
Bigbank Tartu (Estonia)	4–5	(Estonia) Rakvere	2–3	3–1	0–3
Jēkabpils Lūši (Latvia)	5–1	(Estonia) Selver Tallinn	3–2	3–1	

== Final four ==
- Organizer: Saaremaa
- Venue: Kuressaare Sports Centre, Kuressaare, Estonia

Semifinals
23 March
(Estonia) Saaremaa	3
(Estonia) Rakvere	1
23 March
(Estonia) Pärnu	3
(Latvia) Jēkabpils Lūši	1

Final
24 March
(Estonia) Saaremaa	3
(Estonia) Pärnu	2
3rd place match
24 March
(Estonia) Rakvere	2
(Latvia) Jēkabpils Lūši	3

=== Semifinals ===
Date	Time		Score		Set 1	Set 2	Set 3	Set 4	Set 5	Total	Report
23 Mar	16:00	Saaremaa (Estonia)	3–1	(Estonia) Rakvere	25–19	20–25	25–18	25–14		95–76	Report
23 Mar	19:00	Pärnu (Estonia)	3–1	(Latvia) Jēkabpils Lūši	24–26	25–20	25–19	25–12		99–77	Report

=== 3rd place match ===
Date	Time		Score		Set 1	Set 2	Set 3	Set 4	Set 5	Total	Report
24 Mar	14:00	Rakvere (Estonia)	2–3	(Latvia) Jēkabpils Lūši	15–25	19–25	25–12	25–22	10–15	94–99	Report

=== Final ===
Date	Time		Score		Set 1	Set 2	Set 3	Set 4	Set 5	Total	Report
24 Mar	17:00	Saaremaa (Estonia)	3–2	(Estonia) Pärnu	25–21	25–19	23–25	20–25	15–9	108–99	Report

== Final ranking ==
Rank	Team
1st place, gold medalist(s)	(Estonia) Saaremaa
2nd place, silver medalist(s)	(Estonia) Pärnu
3rd place, bronze medalist(s)	(Latvia) Jēkabpils Lūši
4	(Estonia) Rakvere
5	(Estonia) Bigbank Tartu
6	(Estonia) Selver Tallinn
7	(Latvia) RTU/Robežsardze
8	(Latvia) Biolars/Jelgava
9	(Lithuania) Raseiniai Norvelita
10	(Estonia) Järvamaa
11	(Estonia) TTÜ
12	(Latvia) Daugavpils Universitāte
13	(Lithuania) Elga Master Idea SM Dubysa
14	(Latvia) OC Limbaži/MSG

2017–18 Baltic Men Volleyball League Champions

1st title

12–man Roster for Final Four
Matej Hukel, Mihkel Tanila, Rauno Tamme, Aleksander Eerma, Hindrek Pulk, Alexander Tusch, Tomaš Halanda, Johan Vahter, Kostiantyn Riabukha, Markus Veltson, Helar Jalg, (c) Siim Põlluäär
Head coach
Urmas Tali

== Final four awards ==
- Most valuable player
  (Estonia) Hindrek Pulk (Saaremaa)
- Best setter
  (Austria) Alexander Tusch (Saaremaa)
- Best Outside Hitters
  (Slovakia) Tomaš Halanda (Saaremaa)
  (Estonia) Märt Tammearu (Pärnu)
- Best Middle Blockers
  (Estonia) Harri Palmar (Pärnu)
  (Estonia) Siim Ennemuist (Rakvere)
- Best Opposite Hitter
  (Estonia) Hindrek Pulk (Saaremaa)
- Best libero
  (Latvia) Davis Melnis (Jēkabpils Lūši)
