= 2016–17 Baltic Men Volleyball League =

- League: Baltic Men Volleyball League
- Sport: Volleyball
- Duration: 15 October 2016 – 19 March 2017
- Season champions: (Estonia) Bigbank Tartu

Finals
- Champions: (Estonia) Rakvere
- Runners-up: (Estonia) Pärnu
- Finals MVP: (Estonia) Siim Põlluäär (Rakvere)

Baltic Volleyball League seasons
- ← 2015–16 2017–18 →

The 2016–17 Baltic Men Volleyball League, known as Credit 24 Champions League for sponsorship reasons, was the 12th edition of the highest level of club volleyball in the Baltic states.

== Participating teams ==
Location of 2016–17 Baltic Men Volleyball League teams.

The following teams took part in the 2016–17 edition of Baltic Men Volleyball League.

=== Venues and personnel ===
Team	Location	Arena	Head Coach
(Estonia) Bigbank Tartu	Tartu	University of Tartu Sports Hall	(Estonia) Oliver Lüütsepp
(Estonia) Järvamaa	Paide	E-Piim Sports Hall	(Estonia) Laimons Raudsepp
(Estonia) Pärnu	Pärnu	Pärnu Sports Hall	(Estonia) Avo Keel
(Estonia) Rakvere	Rakvere	Rakvere Sports Hall	(Estonia) Urmas Tali
(Estonia) Selver Tallinn	Tallinn	Audentes Sports Centre	(Estonia) Rainer Vassiljev
(Estonia) TTÜ	Tallinn	TTÜ Sports Hall	(Estonia) Janis Sirelpuu
(Latvia) ASK Kuldīga	Kuldīga		(Latvia) Nauris Sokolovskis
(Latvia) Biolars/Jelgava	Jelgava	Zemgale Olympic Center	(Latvia) Jurijs Deveikus
(Latvia) Ezerzeme/DU	Daugavpils	Daugavpils Olympic Center	(Latvia) Edgars Savickis
(Latvia) Jēkabpils Lūši	Jēkabpils	Jēkabpils Sporta nams	(Latvia) Mārcis Obrumans
(Latvia) Poliurs/Ozolnieki	Ozolnieki		(Latvia) Guntis Atars
(Latvia) RTU/Robežsardze	Riga	Vamoic Sports Hall	(Latvia) Raimonds Vilde
(Lithuania) Elga Master Idea SM Dubysa	Šiauliai		(Lithuania) Modestas Strockis
(Lithuania) Flamingo Volley-SM Tauras	Vilnius		(Lithuania) Vasilij Burakinskij

== Main Tournament ==
All participating 14 clubs were playing according to the double round robin system.

Pos	Team	Pld	W	L	Pts	SW	SL	SR	SPW	SPL	SPR	Qualification
1	(Estonia) Bigbank Tartu	26	24	2	70	73	16	4.563	2103	1760	1.195	Qualified for Playoffs
2	(Estonia) Selver Tallinn	26	23	3	65	71	22	3.227	2182	1829	1.193	Qualified for Playoffs
3	(Estonia) Pärnu	26	22	4	64	71	29	2.448	2147	1892	1.135	Qualified for Playoffs
4	(Lithuania) Flamingo Volley-SM Tauras	26	17	9	51	60	39	1.538	2180	2030	1.074	Qualified for Playoffs
5	(Estonia) Rakvere	26	15	11	45	57	43	1.326	1968	1920	1.025	Qualified for Playoffs
6	(Latvia) RTU/Robežsardze	26	15	11	44	52	46	1.130	2144	2131	1.006	Qualified for Playoffs
7	(Latvia) Jēkabpils Lūši	26	13	13	38	51	52	0.981	2267	2245	1.010	Qualified for Playoffs
8	(Latvia) Poliurs/Ozolnieki	26	12	14	36	48	53	0.906	2236	2254	0.992	Qualified for Playoffs
9	(Latvia) Biolars/Jelgava	26	11	15	35	45	53	0.849	2027	2037	0.995	
10	(Lithuania) Elga Master Idea SM Dubysa	26	10	16	33	43	54	0.796	1950	2051	0.951	
11	(Estonia) Järvamaa	26	8	18	26	41	61	0.672	2162	2221	0.973	
12	(Latvia) Ezerzeme/DU	26	7	19	22	38	68	0.559	2122	2316	0.916	
13	(Estonia) TTÜ	26	3	23	10	19	72	0.264	1754	2104	0.834	
14	(Latvia) ASK/Kuldīga	26	2	24	7	13	74	0.176	1591	2043	0.779	

Updated to match(es) played on 5 March 2017. Source: Credit24 Champions League

== Playoffs ==
The four winners of each series qualified to the Final Four, while the other four teams were eliminated.

Team 1	Agg.	Team 2	Game 1	Game 2	Game 3
Bigbank Tartu (Estonia)	6–3	(Latvia) Poliurs/Ozolnieki	3–0	0–3	3–0
Selver Tallinn (Estonia)	5–1	(Latvia) Jēkabpils Lūši	3–2	3–0	
Pärnu (Estonia)	6–0	(Latvia) RTU/Robežsardze	3–1	3–0	
Flamingo Volley-SM Tauras (Lithuania)	0–6	(Estonia) Rakvere	0–3	0–3	

== Final four ==
- Organizer: Bigbank Tartu
- Venue: Võru Sports Centre, Võru, Estonia

Semifinals
18 March
(Estonia) Bigbank Tartu	1
(Estonia) Rakvere	3
18 March
(Estonia) Selver Tallinn	2
(Estonia) Pärnu	3

Final
19 March
(Estonia) Rakvere	3
(Estonia) Pärnu	2
3rd place match
19 March
(Estonia) Bigbank Tartu	3
(Estonia) Selver Tallinn	2

=== Semifinals ===
Date	Time		Score		Set 1	Set 2	Set 3	Set 4	Set 5	Total	Report
18 Mar	16:00	Bigbank Tartu (Estonia)	1–3	(Estonia) Rakvere	25–18	24–26	17–25	10–25		76–94	Report
18 Mar	19:00	Selver Tallinn (Estonia)	2–3	(Estonia) Pärnu	25–16	21–25	25–23	20–25	11–15	102–104	Report

=== 3rd place match ===
Date	Time		Score		Set 1	Set 2	Set 3	Set 4	Set 5	Total	Report
19 Mar	14:00	Bigbank Tartu (Estonia)	3–2	(Estonia) Selver Tallinn	25–22	25–23	27–29	22–25	15–10	114–109	Report

=== Final ===
Date	Time		Score		Set 1	Set 2	Set 3	Set 4	Set 5	Total	Report
19 Mar	17:00	Rakvere (Estonia)	3–2	(Estonia) Pärnu	12–25	20–25	25–22	26–24	15–13	98–109	Report

== Final ranking ==
Rank	Team
1st place, gold medalist(s)	(Estonia) Rakvere
2nd place, silver medalist(s)	(Estonia) Pärnu
3rd place, bronze medalist(s)	(Estonia) Bigbank Tartu
4	(Estonia) Selver Tallinn
5	(Lithuania) Flamingo Volley-SM Tauras
6	(Latvia) RTU/Robežsardze
7	(Latvia) Jēkabpils Lūši
8	(Latvia) Poliurs/Ozolnieki
9	(Latvia) Biolars/Jelgava
10	(Lithuania) Elga Master Idea SM Dubysa
11	(Estonia) Järvamaa
12	(Latvia) Ezerzeme/DU
13	(Estonia) TTÜ
14	(Latvia) ASK/Kuldīga

2016–17 Baltic Men Volleyball League Champions

1st title

12–man Roster for Final Four
Andris Õunpuu, Kevin Saar, Magnus Kallas, Rasmus Rohumets, Tanel Uusküla, Karl Maidle, Kaupo Kivisild, Romet Priimägi, Alari Saar, Artis Caics, Siim Põlluäär, Kristjan Jürima
Head coach
Urmas Tali

== Final four awards ==
- Most valuable player
  (Estonia) Siim Põlluäär (Rakvere)
- Best setter
  (Latvia) Artis Caics (Rakvere)
- Best outside hitters
  (Estonia) Tanel Uusküla (Rakvere)
  (Estonia) Taavet Leppik (Pärnu)
- Best middle blockers
  (Latvia) Toms Švans (Pärnu)
  (Estonia) Kaupo Kivisild (Rakvere)
- Best opposite spiker
  (Estonia) Siim Põlluäär (Rakvere)
- Best libero
  (Estonia) Rait Rikberg (Bigbank Tartu)
