= 2015–16 Baltic Men Volleyball League =

- League: Baltic Men Volleyball League
- Sport: Volleyball
- Duration: 31 October 2015 – 13 March 2016
- Season champions: (Estonia) Pärnu

Finals
- Champions: (Estonia) Pärnu
- Runners-up: (Latvia) Biolars/Jelgava
- Finals MVP: (Estonia) Hindrek Pulk (Pärnu)

Baltic Volleyball League seasons
- ← 2014–15 2016–17 →

The 2015–16 Baltic Men Volleyball League, also known as the League of Hundred, was the 11th edition of the highest level of club volleyball in the Baltic states.

== Participating teams ==
Location of 2015–16 Baltic Men Volleyball League teams.

The following teams took part in the 2015–16 edition of Baltic Men Volleyball League.

=== Venues and personnel ===
Team	Location	Arena	Head Coach
(Estonia) Bigbank Tartu	Tartu	University of Tartu Sports Hall	(Estonia) Oliver Lüütsepp
(Estonia) Järvamaa	Paide	E-Piim Sports Hall	(Estonia) Villi Vantsi
(Estonia) Pärnu	Pärnu	Pärnu Sports Hall	(Estonia) Avo Keel
(Estonia) Rakvere	Rakvere	Rakvere Sports Hall	(Estonia) Urmas Tali
(Estonia) Selver Tallinn	Tallinn	Audentes Sports Centre	(Estonia) Rainer Vassiljev
(Estonia) TTÜ	Tallinn	TTÜ Sports Hall	(Estonia) Janis Sirelpuu
(Latvia) ASK Kuldīga	Kuldīga		(Latvia) Nauris Sokolovskis
(Latvia) Biolars/Jelgava	Jelgava	Zemgale Olympic Center	(Latvia) Jurijs Deveikus
(Latvia) Daugavpils Universitāte	Daugavpils	Daugavpils Olympic Center	(Latvia) Edgars Savickis
(Latvia) Jēkabpils Lūši	Jēkabpils	Jēkabpils Sporta nams	(Latvia) Mārcis Obrumans
(Latvia) Poliurs/Ozolnieki	Ozolnieki		(Latvia) Guntis Atars
(Latvia) RTU/Robežsardze	Riga	Vamoic Sports Hall	(Latvia) Raimonds Vilde
(Lithuania) Flamingo Volley-SM Tauras	Vilnius		(Lithuania) Vasilij Burakinskij

== Main Tournament ==
All participating 13 clubs were playing according to the double round robin system.

Pos	Team	Pld	W	L	Pts	SW	SL	SR	SPW	SPL	SPR	Qualification
1	(Estonia) Pärnu	24	20	4	60	65	24	2.708	1893	1696	1.116	Qualified for Playoffs
2	(Estonia) Selver Tallinn	24	19	5	53	63	35	1.800	2180	1984	1.099	Qualified for Playoffs
3	(Latvia) RTU/Robežsardze	24	17	7	52	58	33	1.758	2154	1946	1.107	Qualified for Playoffs
4	(Latvia) Biolars/Jelgava	24	17	7	48	59	39	1.513	2260	2092	1.080	Qualified for Playoffs
5	(Lithuania) Flamingo Volley-SM Tauras	24	14	10	40	51	42	1.214	1801	1738	1.036	Qualified for Playoffs
6	(Latvia) Poliurs/Ozolnieki	24	12	12	39	50	45	1.111	2119	2064	1.027	Qualified for Playoffs
7	(Estonia) Rakvere	24	13	11	38	52	48	1.083	2182	2192	0.995	Qualified for Playoffs
8	(Estonia) Bigbank Tartu	24	12	12	36	46	44	1.045	1956	1976	0.990	Qualified for Playoffs
9	(Latvia) Daugavpils Universitāte	24	10	14	26	39	55	0.709	2017	2083	0.968	
10	(Estonia) TTÜ	24	7	17	24	37	58	0.638	1920	2054	0.935	
11	(Latvia) Jēkabpils Lūši	24	7	17	24	35	57	0.614	1940	2109	0.920	
12	(Estonia) Järvamaa	24	5	19	18	29	59	0.492	1874	2093	0.895	
13	(Latvia) ASK Kuldīga	24	3	21	10	23	68	0.338	1809	2078	0.871	

Updated to match(es) played on 28 February 2016. Source: League of Hundred 2015/2016 Regular Season

== Playoffs ==
The four winners of each series qualified to the Final Four, while the other four teams were eliminated.

Team 1	Agg.	Team 2	Game 1	Game 2	Game 3
Pärnu (Estonia)	5–1	(Estonia) Bigbank Tartu	3–2	3–0	
Selver Tallinn (Estonia)	1–5	(Estonia) Rakvere	2–3	1–3	
RTU/Robežsardze (Latvia)	4–5	(Latvia) Poliurs/Ozolnieki	3–0	1–3	2–3
Biolars/Jelgava (Latvia)	6–3	(Lithuania) Flamingo Volley-SM Tauras	3–1	2–3	3–2

== Final four ==
- Organizer: Pärnu
- Venue: Pärnu Sports Hall, Pärnu, Estonia

Semifinals
12 March
(Estonia) Pärnu	3
(Estonia) Rakvere	1
12 March
(Latvia) Biolars/Jelgava	3
(Latvia) Poliurs/Ozolnieki	1

Final
13 March
(Estonia) Pärnu	3
(Latvia) Biolars/Jelgava	0
3rd place match
13 March
(Estonia) Rakvere	2
(Latvia) Poliurs/Ozolnieki	3

=== Semifinals ===
Date	Time		Score		Set 1	Set 2	Set 3	Set 4	Set 5	Total	Report
12 Mar	16:00	Pärnu (Estonia)	3–1	(Estonia) Rakvere	27–25	18–25	25–21	25–18		95–89	Report
12 Mar	19:00	Biolars/Jelgava (Latvia)	3–1	(Latvia) Poliurs/Ozolnieki	25–14	25–16	24–26	25–21		99–77	Report

=== 3rd place match ===
Date	Time		Score		Set 1	Set 2	Set 3	Set 4	Set 5	Total	Report
13 Mar	13:00	Rakvere (Estonia)	2–3	(Latvia) Poliurs/Ozolnieki	36–34	25–22	16–25	11–25	13–15	101–121	Report

=== Final ===
Date	Time		Score		Set 1	Set 2	Set 3	Set 4	Set 5	Total	Report
13 Mar	16:00	Pärnu (Estonia)	3–0	(Latvia) Biolars/Jelgava	25–17	25–20	25–20			75–57	Report

== Final ranking ==
Rank	Team
1st place, gold medalist(s)	(Estonia) Pärnu
2nd place, silver medalist(s)	(Latvia) Biolars/Jelgava
3rd place, bronze medalist(s)	(Latvia) Poliurs/Ozolnieki
4	(Estonia) Rakvere
5	(Estonia) Selver Tallinn
6	(Latvia) RTU/Robežsardze
7	(Lithuania) Flamingo Volley-SM Tauras
8	(Estonia) Bigbank Tartu
9	(Latvia) Daugavpils Universitāte
10	(Estonia) TTÜ
11	(Latvia) Jēkabpils Lūši
12	(Estonia) Järvamaa
13	(Latvia) ASK Kuldīga

2015–16 Baltic Men Volleyball League Champions

1st title

12–man Roster for Final Four
Andrus Raadik (c), Martti Keel, Taavet Leppik, Timo Tammemaa, Edgar Järvekülg, Tamar Nassar, Kardo Kõresaar, Harri Palmar, Jaanus Nõmmsalu, Hindrek Pulk, Markkus Keel, Gilbert Bergštein
Head coach
Avo Keel

== Final four awards ==
- Most valuable player
  (Estonia) Hindrek Pulk (Pärnu)
- Best setter
  (Estonia) Martti Keel (Pärnu)
- Best Outside Hitters
  (Estonia) Andrus Raadik (Pärnu)
  (Latvia) Ansis Medenis (Poliurs/Ozolnieki)
- Best Middle Blockers
  (Estonia) Timo Tammemaa (Pärnu)
  (Latvia) Peteris Aukmanis (Biolars/Jelgava)
- Best Opposite Hitter
  (Estonia) Hindrek Pulk (Pärnu)
- Best libero
  (Latvia) Austris Štāls (Biolars/Jelgava)
