= 2021–22 Baltic Men Volleyball League =

- League: Baltic Men Volleyball League
- Sport: Volleyball
- Duration: 3 October 2021 – 26 February 2022
- Season champions: (Estonia) Bigbank Tartu

Finals
- Champions: (Estonia) Bigbank Tartu
- Runners-up: (Estonia) TalTech
- Finals MVP: (Estonia) Kert Toobal (Bigbank Tartu)

Baltic Volleyball League seasons
- ← 2020–21 2022–23 →

The 2021–22 Baltic Men Volleyball League, known as Credit 24 Champions League for sponsorship reasons, was the 17th edition of the highest level of club volleyball in the Baltic states.

== Participating teams ==
Location of 2021–22 Baltic Men Volleyball League teams.

The following teams participate in the 2020–21 edition of Baltic Men Volleyball League.

=== Venues, personnel and kits ===
Team	Location	Arena	Head Coach	Captain	Kit manufacturer	Shirt sponsor
(Estonia) Bigbank Tartu	Tartu	University of Tartu Sports Hall	(Estonia) Alar Rikberg	(Estonia) Kert Toobal	Joma	Bigbank
(Estonia) Pärnu	Pärnu	Pärnu Sports Hall	(Estonia) Avo Keel	(Estonia) Markus Uuskari	Teamshield	EcoBirch
(Estonia) Selver Tallinn	Tallinn	Audentes Sports Centre	(Estonia) Andres Toobal	(Estonia) Denis Losnikov	Erreà	Hansaviimistlus
(Estonia) TalTech	Tallinn	TalTech Sports Hall	(Estonia) Janis Sirelpuu	(Estonia) Martti Keel	Macron	Optimus Systems
(Latvia) Biolars/Jelgava	Jelgava	Zemgale Olympic Center	(Latvia) Lauris Iecelnieks	(Latvia) Sandis Vilcāns	Joma	Jelgava
(Latvia) Daugavpils Universitāte	Daugavpils	Daugavpils Olympic Center	(Latvia) Guntis Atars	(Latvia) Antons Nazarovs	Erreà	Daugavpils
(Latvia) Jēkabpils Lūši	Jēkabpils	Jēkabpils Sporta nams	(Latvia) Mārcis Obrumans	(Latvia) Eriks Voronko	Macron	Jēkabpils / Optibet
(Latvia) RTU/Robežsardze/Jūrmala	Jūrmala	Jūrmala State Gymnasium SH	(Latvia) Raimonds Vilde	(Latvia) Aleksandrs Avdejevs	Erreà	Riga Technical University
(Lithuania) Gargždai Amber-Arlanga	Gargždai	Sporto rūmai Klaipėda	(Latvia) Austris Štāls	(Ukraine) Dmytro Shlomin	ETX	Arlanga

=== Coaching changes ===
Team	Outgoing coach	Manner of departure	Date of vacancy	Position in table	Incoming coach	Date of appointment
Biolars/Jelgava	(Latvia) Austris Štāls	Mutual consent	2021	Pre-season	(Latvia) Lauris Iecelnieks	2021
Gargždai Amber-Arlanga	(Lithuania) Saulius Matikonis	Mutual consent	2021	Pre-season	(Latvia) Austris Štāls	2021
Selver Tallinn	(Estonia) Rainer Vassiljev	Mutual consent	8 August 2021	Pre-season	(Estonia) Andres Toobal	20 August 2021

== Regular season ==
All participating 9 clubs are playing according to the double round robin system.

Pos	Team	Pld	W	L	Pts	SW	SL	SR	SPW	SPL	SPR	Qualification
1	(Estonia) Bigbank Tartu	16	15	1	46	47	7	6.714	1319	1027	1.284	Playoffs
2	(Estonia) TalTech	16	12	4	36	40	18	2.222	1341	1193	1.124	Playoffs
3	(Estonia) Pärnu	16	10	6	28	33	24	1.375	1274	1210	1.053	Playoffs
4	(Estonia) Selver Tallinn	16	9	7	28	34	25	1.360	1329	1285	1.034	Playoffs
5	(Lithuania) Gargždai Amber-Arlanga	16	9	7	25	29	27	1.074	1286	1216	1.058	Playoffs
6	(Latvia) Jēkabpils Lūši	16	6	10	19	21	34	0.618	1144	1259	0.909	Playoffs
7	(Latvia) RTU/Robežsardze/Jūrmala	16	6	10	18	24	34	0.706	1254	1312	0.956	Playoffs
8	(Latvia) Daugavpils Universitāte	16	4	12	12	19	41	0.463	1268	1410	0.899	Playoffs
9	(Latvia) Biolars/Jelgava	16	1	15	4	9	46	0.196	1046	1349	0.775	

Updated to match(es) played on 13 February 2022. Source: Credit24 Champions League Regular Season

== Playoffs ==
The four winners of each series qualify to the Final four, while the other four teams are eliminated.

Team 1	Agg.	Team 2	Game 1	Game 2	Game 3
Bigbank Tartu (Estonia)	6–0	(Latvia) Daugavpils Universitāte	3–1	3–0	
TalTech (Estonia)	5–1	(Latvia) RTU/Robežsardze/Jūrmala	3–1	3–2	
Pärnu (Estonia)	5–1	(Latvia) Jēkabpils Lūši	3–1	3–2	
Selver Tallinn (Estonia)	1–5	(Lithuania) Gargždai Amber-Arlanga	0–3	2–3	

== Final four ==
- Organizer: Bigbank Tartu
- Venue: A. Le Coq Sports Hall, Tartu, Estonia

Semifinals
(Estonia) Bigbank Tartu	3
(Lithuania) Gargždai Amber-Arlanga	0
(Estonia) TalTech	3
(Estonia) Pärnu	0

Final
(Estonia) Bigbank Tartu	3
(Estonia) TalTech	0
3rd place match
(Lithuania) Gargždai Amber-Arlanga	2
(Estonia) Pärnu	3

=== Semifinals ===
Date	Time		Score		Set 1	Set 2	Set 3	Set 4	Set 5	Total	Report
25 Feb	17:00	TalTech (Estonia)	3–0	(Estonia) Pärnu	25–21	25–22	25–19			75–62	Report
25 Feb	20:00	Bigbank Tartu (Estonia)	3–0	(Lithuania) Gargždai Amber-Arlanga	25–18	25–18	25–15			75–51	Report

=== 3rd place match ===
Date	Time		Score		Set 1	Set 2	Set 3	Set 4	Set 5	Total	Report
26 Feb	15:00	Pärnu (Estonia)	3–2	(Lithuania) Gargždai Amber-Arlanga	25–27	22–25	25–14	25–14	15–10	112–90	Report

=== Final ===
Date	Time		Score		Set 1	Set 2	Set 3	Set 4	Set 5	Total	Report
26 Feb	18:00	Bigbank Tartu (Estonia)	3–0	(Estonia) TalTech	25–21	25–16	25–20			75–57	Report

== Final ranking ==
Rank	Team
1st place, gold medalist(s)	(Estonia) Bigbank Tartu
2nd place, silver medalist(s)	(Estonia) TalTech
3rd place, bronze medalist(s)	(Estonia) Pärnu
4	(Lithuania) Gargždai Amber-Arlanga
5	(Estonia) Selver Tallinn
6	(Latvia) Jēkabpils Lūši
7	(Latvia) RTU/Robežsardze/Jūrmala
8	(Latvia) Daugavpils Universitāte
9	(Latvia) Biolars/Jelgava

2020–21 Baltic Men Volleyball League Champions
(Estonia)
Bigbank Tartu
4th title

14–man Roster for Final Four
Rait Rikberg, Taavet Leppik, Kert Toobal, Martti Juhkami, Kevin Soo, Hergo Hansman, Albert Hurt, Ronald Järv, Allar Keskülla, Alex Saaremaa, Tamur Viidalepp, Valentin Kordas, Siim Päid, Mart Naaber
Head coach
Alar Rikberg

== Final four awards ==
- Most valuable player
  (Estonia) Kert Toobal (Bigbank Tartu)
- Best setter
  (Ukraine) Dmytro Shlomin (Gargždai Amber-Arlanga)
- Best outside hitters
  (Estonia) Albert Hurt (Bigbank Tartu)
  (Estonia) Kevin Saar (TalTech)
- Best middle blockers
  (Latvia) Toms Švans (Pärnu)
  (Estonia) Mihkel Tanila (TalTech)
- Best opposite hitter
  (Estonia) Valentin Kordas (Bigbank Tartu)
- Best libero
  (Estonia) Silver Maar (Pärnu)
