= Lincoln Williams =

Australian volleyball player (born 1993)

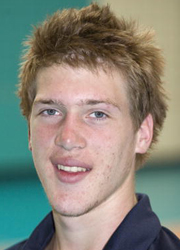
- Williams in 2010

Personal information
- Full name: Lincoln Alexander Williams
- Nationality: Australian
- Born: 6 October 1993 (age 33); Brisbane, Queensland, Australia
- Height: 200 cm (6 ft 7 in)
- Weight: 104 kg (229 lb)
- Spike: 360 cm (142 in)
- Block: 335 cm (132 in)

Volleyball information
- Position: opposite hitter
- Current club: Selver x TalTech
- Number: 18

Career
Years	Teams
2010–2012; 2012–2013; 2013–2014; 2014–2017; 2017–2018; 2018–2019; 2019–2020; 2020–2021; 2021	(Australia) Australian Institute of Sport (Sweden) Linköpings VC (Italy) Volley Corigliano (Estonia) Selver Tallinn (Germany) United Volleys Frankfurt (Poland) MKS Będzin (Russia) Yugra-Samotlor Niznevartovsk (France) AS Cannes Volley-Ball (South Korea) Incheon Korean Air Jumbos

National team
2012–	Australia
Honours
Representing Australia
Men's volleyball
Asian Championship
Silver medal – second place	2019 Tehran	Team

Lincoln Alexander Williams (born 6 October 1993) is an Australian male volleyball player who is currently playing for Incheon Korean Air Jumbos in the Korean V-League.

== Club career ==
At club level Williams has played for the AIS (Australian Institute of Sport senior team starting at age 16 in 2010 to 2012) in the Australian Volleyball League - winning MVP and the Best Spiker award two seasons that he played. After the 2012 Olympics he has played for European clubs Linköpings VC in Sweden, Volley Corigliano in Italy, Selver Tallinn in Estonia, United Volleys Frankfurt of the Deutsche Volleyball-Bundesliga, MKS Będzin of the Polish PlusLiga, Yugra-Samotlor in Nizhnevartovsk of the Russian Super League and AS Cannes Volley-Ball of the French League.

He currently plays for Incheon Korean Air Jumbos in the Korean V-League.

== Australian national team ==
Williams was a member of the Australia men's national volleyball team at age 18 and competed at the 2012 Summer Olympics. Williams has represented Australia in a number of matches in Volleyball World League of 2014, 2015 and 2017. He also competed in the 2018 FIVB Men's World Championships and the FIVB Volleyball Nations League Championships setting a new record for most aces in a single match (6) against Russia on 1 June 2018 in the VNL.

== Sporting achievements ==
=== Clubs ===
Baltic League

- 2014/2015 - with Selver Tallinn

National championship

- 2011/2012 Australian Championship, with AIS
- 2012/2013 Swedish Championship, with Linköpings VC
- 2015/2016 Estonian Championship, with Selver Tallinn
- 2016/2017 Estonian Championship, with Selver Tallinn
- 2017/2018 German Championship, with United Volleys Frankfurt
- 2020/2021 French Championship, with AS Cannes Volley-Ball

National cup

- 2016/2017 Estonian Cup 2016, with Selver Tallinn

=== National team ===
- 2019 AVC Asian Championship

=== Individual ===
- 2011 Australian League Most Valuable Player
- 2011 Australian League Best Spiker
- 2012 Australian League Most Valuable Player
- 2012 Australian League Best Spiker
- 2015 Baltic League – Best Scorer
- 2021 French League Most Valuable Player
