= Timo Tammemaa =

Estonian volleyball player (born 1991)

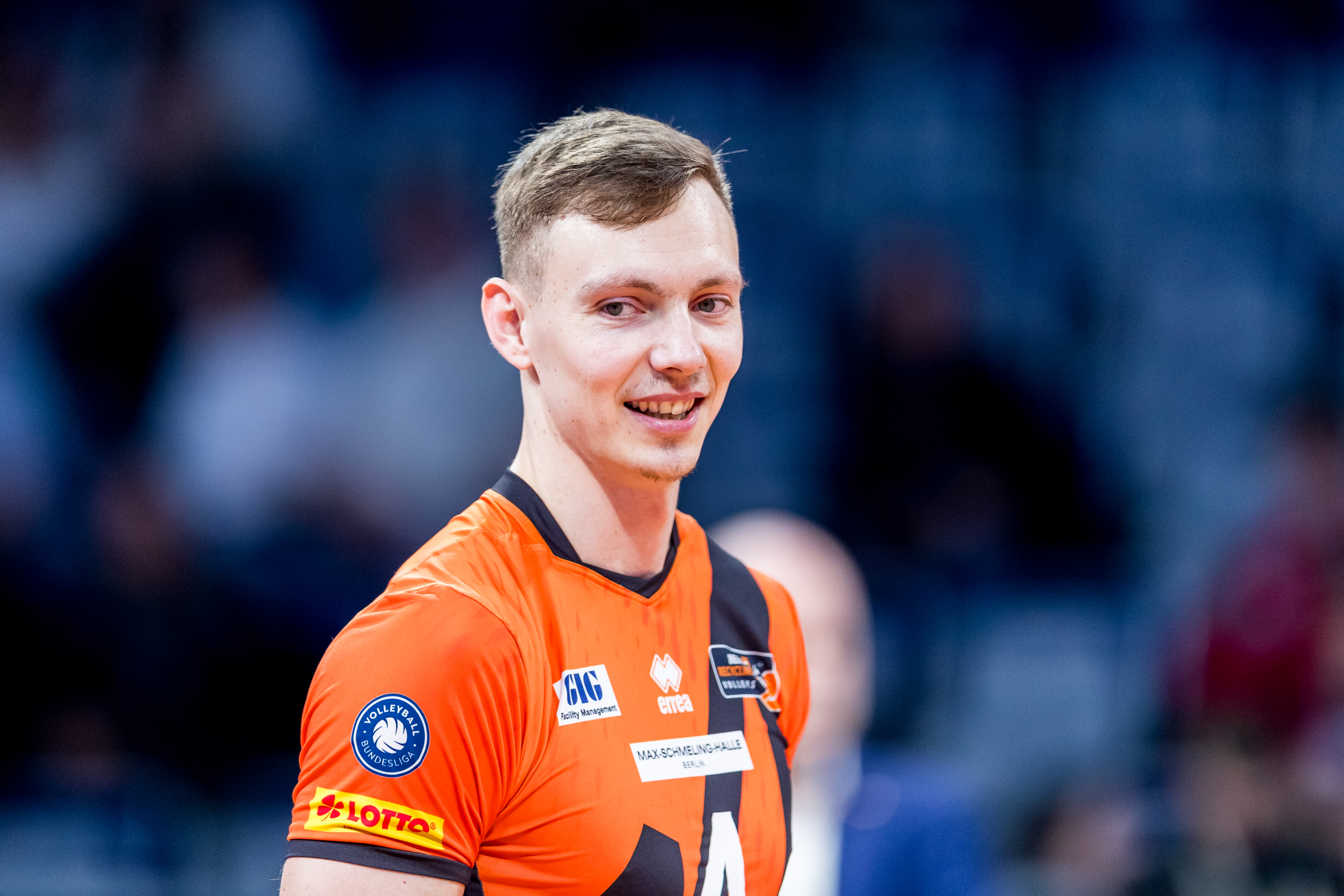

Personal information
- Nationality: (Estonia) Estonian
- Born: 18 November 1991 (age 35) Kuressaare, Estonia
- Height: 2.04 m (6 ft 8 in)
- Weight: 93 kg (205 lb)
- Spike: 363 cm (143 in)
- Block: 343 cm (135 in)

Volleyball information
- Position: Middle blocker
- Current club: (Japan) Voreas Hokkaido
- Number: 44

Career
- Years: Team
- 2009–2014 2014–2016 2016–2017 2017–2019 2019–2020 2020–2022 2022–2023 2023–2024 2024–: (Estonia) Selver Tallinn (Estonia) Pärnu (France) Spacer's de Toulouse (Belgium) Noliko Maaseik (France) Tours VB (Poland) Asseco Resovia (Poland) Czarni Radom (Germany) Berlin Recycling Volleys (Japan) Voreas Hokkaido

National team
- Years: Team
- 2015–: Estonia
Honours
Men's volleyball
Representing Estonia
FIVB Challenger Cup
Bronze medal – third place	2018 Portugal
European League
Gold medal – first place	2016 Bulgaria
Gold medal – first place	2018 Czech Republic
Bronze medal – third place	2021 Belgium

Timo Tammemaa (born 18 November 1991) is an Estonian volleyball player, member of the Estonia men's national volleyball team. At the professional club level, he plays for Voreas Hokkaido.

== Club career ==
Timo Tammemaa began his professional career in 2009, when he signed a contract with the Estonian team, Selver Tallinn. In 2014, he moved to Pärnu alongside his coach, Avo Keel, and his teammate Hindrek Pulk. After two seasons, he joined the French team, Spacer's Toulouse. Tammemaa moved to Belgium in the next season to play for Noliko Maaseik. He extended the contract with Noliko for one more season in April 2018. In July 2019, he signed a contract with the top French team, Tours VB. After a year in France Tammemaa moved to Polish PlusLiga where he played two seasons for Asseco Resovia and one season for Czarni Radom. After three years in Poland, Tammemaa played one season in Germany for Berlin Recycling Volleys and won three trophies. In 2024 he moved to Japan to play for V.League team Voreas Hokkaido.

== Estonian national team ==
As a member of the senior Estonian national volleyball team, Tammemaa competed at the 2015, 2017, 2019, 2021 and 2023 European Championships.

== Sporting achievements ==
=== Clubs ===
- Baltic League
  - 2009/2010 – with Selver Tallinn
  - 2010/2011 – with Selver Tallinn
  - 2011/2012 – with Selver Tallinn
  - 2013/2014 – with Selver Tallinn
  - 2015/2016 – with Pärnu
- National championships
  - 2009/2010 Estonian Cup, with Selver Tallinn
  - 2009/2010 Estonian Championship, with Selver Tallinn
  - 2010/2011 Estonian Cup, with Selver Tallinn
  - 2010/2011 Estonian Championship, with Selver Tallinn
  - 2011/2012 Estonian Cup, with Selver Tallinn
  - 2011/2012 Estonian Championship, with Selver Tallinn
  - 2012/2013 Estonian Cup, with Selver Tallinn
  - 2012/2013 Estonian Championship, with Selver Tallinn
  - 2013/2014 Estonian Championship, with Selver Tallinn
  - 2014/2015 Estonian Cup, with Pärnu
  - 2014/2015 Estonian Championship, with Pärnu
  - 2015/2016 Estonian Cup, with Pärnu
  - 2015/2016 Estonian Championship, with Pärnu
  - 2016/2017 French Championship, with Spacer's de Toulouse
  - 2017/2018 Belgian Championship, with Noliko Maaseik
  - 2018/2019 Belgian SuperCup, with Noliko Maaseik
  - 2018/2019 Belgian Championship, with Noliko Maaseik
  - 2023/2024 German SuperCup, with Berlin Recycling Volleys
  - 2023/2024 German Cup, with Berlin Recycling Volleys
  - 2023/2024 German Championship, with Berlin Recycling Volleys
  - 2025/2026 Emperor's Cup, with Voreas Hokkaido

=== Individual awards ===
- 2016: Baltic League – Best Middle Blocker
