= Andri Aganits =

Estonian volleyball player (born 1993)

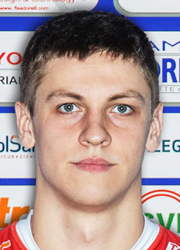
- Andri Aganits, 2014

Personal information
- Nationality: Estonian
- Born: 7 September 1993 (age 33); Põlva, Estonia
- Height: 2.07 m (6 ft 9 in)
- Weight: 100 kg (220 lb)
- Spike: 356 cm (140 in)
- Block: 340 cm (134 in)

Volleyball information
- Position: Middle blocker
- Current club: Selver x TalTech
- Number: 9

Career
Years	Teams
2011–2013; 2013–2014; 2014–2015; 2015–2017; 2017–2018; 2018–2020; 2020–2021; 2021–2022; 2022–	(Estonia) Selver Tallinn (Germany) TV Bühl (Italy) Altotevere Città di Castello (France) Stade Poitevin Poitiers (France) Montpellier UC (Belgium) Noliko Maaseik (Greece) PAOK Thessaloniki (Germany) VfB Friedrichshafen (Estonia) Selver x TalTech

National team
2012–	Estonia
Honours
Men's volleyball
Representing Estonia
European League
Gold medal – first place	2016 Bulgaria
Gold medal – first place	2018 Czech Republic
Bronze medal – third place	2021 Belgium
Challenger Cup
Bronze medal – third place	2018 Portugal
- Last updated: 30 December 2025

Andri Aganits (born 7 September 1993) is an Estonian volleyball player, a member of the Estonia men's national volleyball team and Estonian club Selver x TalTech.

== Club career ==
Aganits played the 2020–21 season in Greek top club PAOK Thessaloniki.

== Estonian national team ==
As a member of the senior Estonia men's national volleyball team, Aganits competed at the 2015, 2017, 2019, 2021 and 2023 Men's European Volleyball Championships.

== Sporting achievements ==
=== Clubs ===
Baltic League

- 2011/2012 – with Selver Tallinn
- 2023/2024 – with Selver x TalTech

National championship

- 2011/2012 Estonian Championship, with Selver Tallinn
- 2012/2013 Estonian Championship, with Selver Tallinn
- 2018/2019 Belgian Championship, with Noliko Maaseik
- 2021/2022 German Championship, with VfB Friedrichshafen
- 2022/2023 Estonian Championship, with Selver x TalTech
- 2023/2024 Estonian Championship, with Selver x TalTech

National cup

- 2011/2012 Estonian Cup, with Selver Tallinn
- 2012/2013 Estonian Cup, with Selver Tallinn
- 2018/2019 Belgian SuperCup, with Noliko Maaseik
- 2019/2020 Belgian SuperCup, with Noliko Maaseik
- 2021/2022 German Cup, with VfB Friedrichshafen
- 2022/2023 Estonian Cup, with Selver x TalTech
- 2023/2024 Estonian Cup, with Selver x TalTech

=== National team ===
- 2016 European League
- 2018 European League
- 2018 Challenger Cup
- 2021 European League

=== Individual ===
- 2012 Young Estonian Volleyball Player of the Year
- 2013 Baltic League – Best Blocker
- 2018 European League – Best Middle Blocker
- 2024 Estonian Championship – Best Middle Blocker
