= List of volleyball clubs in Estonia =

This is the list of volleyball clubs operating (or was operated) in Estonia. The list is incomplete.

Name	Location
Järvamaa VK	Järva County
Kohila Võrkpalliklubi	Kohila
Ösel Foods Tartu	Tartu
Pärnu VK	Pärnu
Rivaal Rakvere VK	Rakvere
Saaremaa VK	Kuressaare
Selver Tallinn VK	Tallinn
Sylvester Tallinn (VK Sylvester)	Tallinn
TalTech Volleyball	Tallinn
Tartu Volleyball	Tartu
Võru VK	Võru
