= 2022–23 Baltic Men Volleyball League =

- League: Baltic Men Volleyball League
- Sport: Volleyball
- Duration: 1 October 2022 – 5 March 2023
- Season champions: (Estonia) Bigbank Tartu
- Finals champions: (Estonia) Bigbank Tartu
- Runners-up: (Latvia) RTU/Robežsardze/Jūrmala

Baltic Volleyball League seasons
- ← 2021–22 2023–24 →

The 2022–23 Baltic Men Volleyball League, known as Credit 24 Champions League for sponsorship reasons, was the 18th edition of the highest level of club volleyball in the Baltic states.

This season was not attended by Lithuanian teams and the overall participation dropped to 7 teams – 4 from Estonia and 3 from Latvia.

== Participating teams ==
Location of 2022–23 Baltic Men Volleyball League teams.

The following teams participated in the 2022–23 edition of Baltic Men Volleyball League.

Team	Location	Arena
(Estonia) Bigbank Tartu	Tartu	University of Tartu Sports Hall
(Estonia) Pärnu	Pärnu	Pärnu Sports Hall
(Estonia) Barrus Võru	Võru	Võru Sports Hall
(Estonia) Selver/TalTech	Tallinn	TalTech Sports Hall
(Latvia) Ezerzeme/DU	Daugavpils	Daugavpils Olympic Center
(Latvia) Jēkabpils Lūši	Jēkabpils	Jēkabpils Sporta nams
(Latvia) RTU/Robežsardze/Jūrmala	Jūrmala	Jūrmala State Gymnasium SH

== Regular season ==
All participating 7 clubs are playing according to the 4 double round robin system with the first place holders receiving a bye to Final four.

Pos	Team	Pld	W	L	Pts	SW	SL	SR	SPW	SPL	SPR	Qualification
1	(Estonia) Bigbank Tartu	24	20	4	60	66	24	2.750	2092	1808	1.157	Final four
2	(Estonia) Selver/TalTech	24	18	6	54	61	28	2.179	2048	1820	1.125	Playoffs
3	(Latvia) Ezerzeme/DU	24	10	14	34	48	51	0.941	2132	2185	0.976	Playoffs
4	(Latvia) RTU/Robežsardze/Jūrmala	24	12	12	33	42	49	0.857	1997	2038	0.980	Playoffs
5	(Latvia) Jēkabpils Lūši	24	11	13	31	41	49	0.837	1953	1993	0.980	Playoffs
6	(Estonia) Barrus Võru	24	9	15	27	38	53	0.717	2012	2022	0.995	Playoffs
7	(Estonia) Pärnu	24	4	20	13	23	65	0.354	1713	2081	0.823	Playoffs

Source: Champions League Regular Season

== Playoffs ==
The three winners of each series qualify to the Final four, while the other three teams are eliminated.

Team 1	Agg.	Team 2	Game 1	Game 2
Selver/TalTech (Estonia)	3–3	(Estonia) Pärnu	1–3	3–0
Ezerzeme/DU (Latvia)	6–0	(Estonia) Barrus Võru	3–1	3–1
RTU/Robežsardze/Jūrmala (Latvia)	6–0	(Latvia) Jēkabpils Lūši	3–0	3–0

Notes

Golden set: Selver/TalTech 13 - 15 Pärnu

== Final four ==
- Organizer: Bigbank Tartu
- Venue: University of Tartu Sports Hall, Tartu, Estonia

Semifinals
(Estonia) Bigbank Tartu	3
(Estonia) Pärnu	0
(Latvia) Ezerzeme/DU	1
(Latvia) RTU/Robežsardze/Jūrmala	3

Final
(Estonia) Bigbank Tartu	3
(Latvia) RTU/Robežsardze/Jūrmala	2
3rd place match
(Estonia) Pärnu	1
(Latvia) Ezerzeme/DU	3

=== Semifinals ===
Date	Time		Score		Set 1	Set 2	Set 3	Set 4	Set 5	Total	Report
4 Mar	16:00	Bigbank Tartu (Estonia)	3–0	(Estonia) Pärnu	25–14	25–19	28–26			78–59	Report
4 Mar	19:00	Ezerzeme/DU (Latvia)	1–3	(Latvia) RTU/Robežsardze/Jūrmala	19–25	16–25	25–23	20–25		80–98	Report

=== 3rd place match ===
Date	Time		Score		Set 1	Set 2	Set 3	Set 4	Set 5	Total	Report
5 Mar	14:00	Pärnu (Estonia)	1–3	(Latvia) Ezerzeme/DU	25–22	21–25	19–25	24–26		89–98	Report

=== Final ===
Date	Time		Score		Set 1	Set 2	Set 3	Set 4	Set 5	Total	Report
5 Mar	17:00	Bigbank Tartu (Estonia)	3–2	(Latvia) RTU/Robežsardze/Jūrmala	18–25	25–22	20–25	25–20	22–20	110–112	Report

== Final ranking ==
Rank	Team
1st place, gold medalist(s)	(Estonia) Bigbank Tartu
2nd place, silver medalist(s)	(Latvia) RTU/Robežsardze/Jūrmala
3rd place, bronze medalist(s)	(Latvia) Ezerzeme/DU
4	(Estonia) Pärnu
5	(Estonia) Selver/TalTech
6	(Latvia) Jēkabpils Lūši
7	(Estonia) Barrus Võru

2022–23 Baltic Men Volleyball League Champions

5th title

14–man Roster for Final Four
Rait Rikberg, Matej Šmidl, Taavet Leppik, Richard Murak, Siim Päid, Kevin Soo, Timo Ander Lõhmus, Martin Elias Tamm, Kristjan Unt, Ronald Järv, Tamur Viidalepp, Markkus Keel, Markus Andreas Tamm, Mart Naaber
Head coach
Alar Rikberg
