= Renee Teppan =

Estonian volleyball player (born 1993)

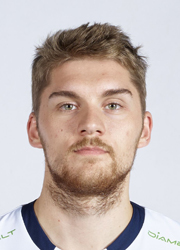
- Renee Teppan, 2018

Personal information
- Nationality: Estonian
- Born: 26 September 1993 (age 33) Selja, Pärnu County, Estonia
- Height: 1.98 m (6 ft 6 in)
- Weight: 89 kg (196 lb)
- Spike: 340 cm (134 in)
- Block: 320 cm (126 in)

Volleyball information
- Position: Opposite
- Current club: (Turkey) İBB Spor Kulübü
- Number: 7

Career
- Years: Team
- 2010–2012 2012–2014 2014–2015 2015–2017 2017–2018 2018–2019 2019–2020 2020 2020–2021 2021–2022 2022 2022–2023 2023–2024 2024 2024–2025 2025–2026 2026–: (Estonia) Pärnu (Estonia) Bigbank Tartu (Italy) Altotevere Città di Castello (Austria) Hypo Tirol Innsbruck (Italy) Diatec Trentino (Poland) PGE Skra Bełchatów (France) Stade Poitevin Poitiers (Belgium) Noliko Maaseik (Estonia) Selver Tallinn (Turkey) Tokat Belediye Plevnespor (Greece) Olympiacos Piraeus (Poland) MKS Będzin (Estonia) Pärnu (United Arab Emirates) Al Wasl (Estonia) Pärnu (Romania) Zalău (Turkey) İBB Spor Kulübü

National team
- Years: Team
- 2014–: Estonia
Honours
Men's volleyball
Representing Estonia
European League
Gold medal – first place	2016 Bulgaria
Gold medal – first place	2018 Czech Republic
Bronze medal – third place	2021 Belgium
Challenger Cup
Bronze medal – third place	2018 Portugal
- Updated on 21 April 2025

Renee Teppan (born 26 September 1993) is an Estonian volleyball player, a member of the Estonia men's national volleyball team and Turkish club İBB Spor Kulübü.

== Club career ==
Teppan was born in Pärnu, and started his career in hometown club Pärnu VK at the age of 17. After two seasons he moved to Bigbank Tartu and won the Estonian Championship in 2014. He then moved to abroad and signed with Italian team Altotevere Città di Castello alongside compatriot Andri Aganits. He spent the next two seasons with Hypo Tirol Innsbruck winning two Austrian Championship titles. For the 2017–18 season Teppan moved back to Italy and played for Diatec Trentino. In May 2018 he signed a two-year contract with the Polish PlusLiga top team PGE Skra Bełchatów. In his first season with the team Teppan mostly played as a substitute for the club legend Mariusz Wlazły. His first trophy with the team was the 2018 Polish SuperCup when Bełchatów defeated Trefl Gdańsk 3–0. Teppan and the team also reached the semi-finals of the 2018–19 CEV Champions League making him the second Estonian after Oliver Venno to play in the semi-finals of the Champions League. He opted out of the second year of the contract and signed with French team Stade Poitevin Poitiers for the 2019–20 season. Teppan left the team in February 2020 and signed with Noliko Maaseik of the Belgian League where he was again united with compatriot Andri Aganits. For the next season he returned to native Estonia and signed with Selver Tallinn. He helped the team win the Estonian Cup and the Baltic League title and was also named MVP of the latter tournament. Teppan started the 2021–22 season in the Turkish Men's Volleyball League playing for Tokat Belediye Plevnespor. Mid-season in January 2022 he joined with Greek top team Olympiacos Piraeus.

== National team ==
As a member of the senior Estonia men's national volleyball team, Teppan competed at the 2015, 2017, 2019, 2021, 2023 and 2026 European Volleyball Championships. With the national team Teppan won the 2016 European Volleyball League title. He helped Estonia win their second European League title in 2018 and was named MVP of the tournament.

== Sporting achievements ==
=== Clubs ===
MEVZA Cup

- 2015/2016 – with Hypo Tirol Innsbruck
- 2016/2017 – with Hypo Tirol Innsbruck

Baltic League

- 2010/2011 – with Pärnu
- 2011/2012 – with Pärnu
- 2013/2014 – with Bigbank Tartu
- 2020/2021 – with Selver Tallinn
- 2024/2025 – with Pärnu

National championship

- 2010/2011 Estonian Championship, with Pärnu
- 2011/2012 Estonian Championship, with Pärnu
- 2013/2014 Estonian Championship, with Bigbank Tartu
- 2015/2016 Austrian Championship, with Hypo Tirol Innsbruck
- 2016/2017 Austrian Championship, with Hypo Tirol Innsbruck
- 2020/2021 Estonian Championship, with Selver Tallinn
- 2021/2022 Greek Championship, with Olympiacos Piraeus
- 2023/2024 UAE Championship, with Al Wasl
- 2024/2025 Estonian Championship, with Pärnu
- 2025/2026 Romanian Championship, with Zalău

National cup

- 2010/2011 Estonian Cup, with Pärnu
- 2013/2014 Estonian Cup, with Bigbank Tartu
- 2018/2019 Polish SuperCup, with PGE Skra Bełchatów
- 2020/2021 Estonian Cup, with Selver Tallinn
- 2024/2025 Estonian Cup, with Pärnu
- 2025/2026 Romanian Cup, with Zalău

=== National team ===
- 2016 European League
- 2018 European League
- 2018 Challenger Cup
- 2021 European League

=== Individual ===
- 2018 European League – Most Valuable Player
- 2021 Baltic League – Most Valuable Player
