= 2005–06 Baltic Men Volleyball League =

- League: Baltic Men Volleyball League
- Sport: Volleyball
- Duration: 1 October 2005 – 16 April 2006
- Season champions: (Latvia) Rīga/LU Inčukalns

Finals
- Champions: (Latvia) Poliurs/Biolar Ozolnieki
- Runners-up: (Estonia) Pere Leib Tartu

Baltic Volleyball League seasons
- 2006–07 →

The 2005–06 Baltic Men Volleyball League, known as Schenker League for sponsorship reasons, was the inaugural edition of the highest level of club volleyball in the Baltic states.

== Participating teams ==
Location of teams in 2005–06 Baltic Men Volleyball League.

Country	Number of teams	Teams
Estonia	6	Aeroc Rakvere; Falck Pärnu; Pere Leib Tartu; Selista Ehitus/Võru; Selver/Audentes; Sylvester Tallinn
Latvia	6	Babīte; Cēsis/Cēsu Alus; ELVI/Kuldīga; Lāse-R Rīga; Poliurs/Biolar Ozolnieki; Rīga/LU Inčukalns

== Main Tournament ==
All participating 12 clubs were playing according to the double round robin system.

Pos	Team	Pld	W	L	Pts	SW	SL	SR	SPW	SPL	SPR	Qualification
1	(Latvia) Rīga/LU Inčukalns	22	19	3	55	59	22	2.682	0	0	—	Final Four I
2	(Latvia) Lāse-R Rīga	22	18	4	53	58	21	2.762	0	0	—	Final Four I
3	(Latvia) Poliurs/Biolar Ozolnieki	22	18	4	50	58	27	2.148	0	0	—	Final Four I
4	(Estonia) Pere Leib Tartu	22	14	8	45	53	27	1.963	0	0	—	Final Four I
5	(Estonia) Falck Pärnu	22	14	8	41	45	32	1.406	0	0	—	Final Four II
6	(Estonia) Selver/Audentes	22	13	9	38	46	40	1.150	0	0	—	Final Four II
7	(Latvia) ELVI/Kuldīga	22	12	10	37	42	39	1.077	0	0	—	Final Four II
8	(Estonia) Sylvester Tallinn	22	9	13	30	38	44	0.864	0	0	—	Final Four II
9	(Latvia) Cēsis/Cēsu Alus	22	7	15	21	29	50	0.580	0	0	—	Final Four III
10	(Estonia) Aeroc Rakvere	22	4	18	13	25	57	0.439	0	0	—	Final Four III
11	(Latvia) Babīte	22	3	19	8	17	61	0.279	0	0	—	Final Four III
12	(Estonia) Selista Ehitus/Võru	22	1	21	5	14	64	0.219	0	0	—	Final Four III

Updated to match(es) played on 26 February 2006. Source: Schenker League

== Final Four III ==
- Organizer: Cēsis/Cēsu Alus
- Venue: Cēsis, Latvia

Semifinals
25 March
(Latvia) Cēsis/Cēsu Alus	3
(Estonia) Selista Ehitus/Võru	0
25 March
(Estonia) Aeroc Rakvere	1
(Latvia) Babīte	3

Places 9.–10.
26 March
(Latvia) Cēsis/Cēsu Alus	3
(Latvia) Babīte	0
Places 11.–12.
26 March
(Estonia) Selista Ehitus/Võru	0
(Estonia) Aeroc Rakvere	3

== Final Four II ==
- Organizer: Falck Pärnu
- Venue: Pärnu, Estonia

Semifinals
15 April
(Estonia) Falck Pärnu	3
(Estonia) Sylvester Tallinn	1
15 April
(Estonia) Selver/Audentes	3
(Latvia) ELVI/Kuldīga	1

Places 5.–6.
16 April
(Estonia) Falck Pärnu	3
(Estonia) Selver/Audentes	2
Places 7.–8.
16 April
(Latvia) ELVI/Kuldīga	3
(Estonia) Sylvester Tallinn	1

== Final Four I ==
- Organizer: Rīga/LU Inčukalns
- Venue: Rīga, Latvia

Semifinals
15 April
(Latvia) Rīga/LU Inčukalns	2
(Estonia) Pere Leib Tartu	3
15 April
(Latvia) Lāse-R Rīga	1
(Latvia) Poliurs/Biolar Ozolnieki	3

Final
16 April
(Estonia) Pere Leib Tartu	1
(Latvia) Poliurs/Biolar Ozolnieki	3
3rd place match
16 April
(Latvia) Rīga/LU Inčukalns	3
(Latvia) Lāse-R Rīga	2

=== Semifinals ===
Date	Time		Score		Set 1	Set 2	Set 3	Set 4	Set 5	Total	Report
15 Apr	14:00	Rīga/LU Inčukalns (Latvia)	2–3	(Estonia) Pere Leib Tartu	25–19	25–13	26–28	19–25	11–15	106–100	Report
15 Apr	17:00	Lāse-R Rīga (Latvia)	1–3	(Latvia) Poliurs/Biolar Ozolnieki	22–25	25–18	22–25	16–25		85–93	Report

=== 3rd place match ===
Date	Time		Score		Set 1	Set 2	Set 3	Set 4	Set 5	Total	Report
16 Apr	11:30	Rīga/LU Inčukalns (Latvia)	3–2	(Latvia) Lāse-R Rīga	29–31	25–27	25–20	28–26	15–9	122–113	Report

=== Final ===
Date	Time		Score		Set 1	Set 2	Set 3	Set 4	Set 5	Total	Report
16 Apr	14:00	Pere Leib Tartu (Estonia)	1–3	(Latvia) Poliurs/Biolar Ozolnieki	25–23	18–25	15–25	18–25		76–98	Report

== Final ranking ==
Rank	Team
1st place, gold medalist(s)	(Latvia) Poliurs/Biolar Ozolnieki
2nd place, silver medalist(s)	(Estonia) Pere Leib Tartu
3rd place, bronze medalist(s)	(Latvia) Rīga/LU Inčukalns
4	(Latvia) Lāse-R Rīga
5	(Estonia) Falck Pärnu
6	(Estonia) Selver/Audentes
7	(Latvia) ELVI/Kuldīga
8	(Estonia) Sylvester Tallinn
9	(Latvia) Cēsis/Cēsu Alus
10	(Latvia) Babīte
11	(Estonia) Aeroc Rakvere
12	(Estonia) Selista Ehitus/Võru

2017–18 Baltic Men Volleyball League Champions

1st title

12-man Roster for Final Four
Head coach
