= Jan Helenius =

Finnish volleyball player (born 1996)

Personal information
- Nationality: Finnish
- Born: 13 October 1996 (age 30); Kotka, Finland
- Height: 1.83 m (6 ft 0 in)
- Weight: 74 kg (163 lb)
- Spike: 330 cm (130 in)
- Block: 310 cm (122 in)

Volleyball information
- Position: Outside spiker
- Current club: TUTO Volley
- Number: 17

Career
Years	Teams
2014–2016; 2016–2018; 2018–2019; 2019–	Rantaperkiön Isku; LEKA Volley; Raision Loimu; Bigbank Tartu

National team
2015–	Finland

Jan Helenius (born 13 October 1996) is a Finnish male volleyball player. He has been a part of the Finland men's national volleyball team. On club level he plays for TUTO Volley.

== Sporting achievements ==
=== Clubs ===
Baltic League

- 2018/2019 – with Bigbank Tartu

National championship

- 2018/2019 Estonian Championship, with Bigbank Tartu
