= 2018 Men's European Volleyball League =

2018 Men's European League
Tournament details
- Host country: Czech Republic
- Dates: 19 May – 16 June
- Teams: 20

Final positions
- Champions: Estonia (2nd title)
- Runners-up: Czech Republic
- Third place: Turkey
- Fourth place: Portugal

Tournament awards
- MVP: (Estonia) Renee Teppan
- Best Setter: (Estonia) Kert Toobal
- Best OH: (Estonia) Oliver Venno (Czech Republic) Donovan Džavoronok
- Best MB: (Estonia) Andri Aganits (Turkey) Vahit Emre Savas
- Best OPP: (Czech Republic) Michal Finger
- Best Libero: (Czech Republic) Milan Monik

The 2018 Men's European Volleyball League was the 15th edition of the annual Men's European Volleyball League, which featured men's national volleyball teams from twenty European countries. Unlike previous seasons, the tournament had two groups: the Golden League, featuring twelve teams, and the Silver League, featuring eight teams.

It also acted as the European qualifying competition for the 2018 FIVB Volleyball Men's Challenger Cup, securing two vacancies for the tournament that then served as the qualifying competition for the 2019 FIVB Volleyball Men's Nations League.

== Pools composition ==
=== Golden League ===
Pool A	Pool B	Pool C
Belgium	Slovenia	Finland
Estonia	Netherlands	Czech Republic
Slovakia	Turkey	Portugal
Sweden	Ukraine	Spain

=== Silver League ===
Pool A	Pool B
Macedonia	Belarus
Latvia	Croatia
Austria	Hungary
Kosovo	Albania

== League round ==
- All times are local.

=== Golden League ===
- The Golden League Final Round hosts Czech Republic and the winners of each pool will qualify for the Golden League Final Round. If Czech Republic finishes first in Pool C, the best second team among all pools will qualify for the Golden League Final Round.

==== Pool A ====
Pos	Team	Pld	W	L	Pts	SW	SL	SR	SPW	SPL	SPR	Qualification
1	Estonia	6	5	1	15	15	6	2.500	509	435	1.170	Golden League Final round
2	Belgium	6	4	2	11	13	9	1.444	501	487	1.029	
3	Sweden	6	2	4	6	9	12	0.750	465	491	0.947	
4	Slovakia	6	1	5	4	6	16	0.375	465	527	0.882	

Date	Time		Score		Set 1	Set 2	Set 3	Set 4	Set 5	Total	Report
19 May	16:00	Sweden	1–3	Belgium	20–25	25–23	21–25	17–25		83–98	Report
19 May	18:00	Slovakia	1–3	Estonia	22–25	26–24	19–25	17–25		84–99	Report
23 May	18:00	Slovakia	3–1	Sweden	25–23	25–18	19–25	25–16		94–82	Report
23 May	20:00	Estonia	3–1	Belgium	25–16	25–20	27–29	25–17		102–82	Report
26 May	20:00	Estonia	3–1	Sweden	25–22	18–25	25–23	25–17		93–87	Report
26 May	20:30	Belgium	3–2	Slovakia	25–22	25–17	22–25	25–27	15–13	112–104	Report
30 May	20:00	Slovakia	0–3	Belgium	23–25	18–25	17–25			58–75	Report
30 May	20:00	Sweden	0–3	Estonia	17–25	17–25	20–25			54–75	Report
2 Jun	19:00	Sweden	3–0	Slovakia	27–25	32–30	25–21			84–76	Report
3 Jun	17:30	Belgium	3–0	Estonia	29–27	25–19	25–19			79–65	Report
6 Jun	20:00	Estonia	3–0	Slovakia	25–14	25–15	25–20			75–49	Report
6 Jun	20:30	Belgium	0–3	Sweden	22–25	15–25	18–25			55–75	Report

==== Pool B ====
Pos	Team	Pld	W	L	Pts	SW	SL	SR	SPW	SPL	SPR	Qualification
1	Turkey	6	4	2	13	16	8	2.000	543	513	1.058	Golden League Final round
2	Netherlands	6	4	2	12	16	12	1.333	631	563	1.121	
3	Ukraine	6	3	3	9	13	13	1.000	563	573	0.983	
4	Slovenia	6	1	5	2	5	17	0.294	441	529	0.834	Relegated position

Date	Time		Score		Set 1	Set 2	Set 3	Set 4	Set 5	Total	Report
20 May	15:30	Turkey	3–0	Ukraine	25–23	25–23	25–20			75–66	Report
20 May	15:00	Netherlands	3–1	Slovenia	25–12	24–26	25–15	25–22		99–75	Report
23 May	15:30	Turkey	3–2	Netherlands	25–23	21–25	25–20	20–25	15–12	106–105	Report
23 May	18:00	Ukraine	3–0	Slovenia	25–23	25–23	25–18			75–64	Report
26 May	17:00	Netherlands	2–3	Ukraine	25–15	20–25	25–20	24–26	13–15	107–101	Report
27 May	20:00	Slovenia	0–3	Turkey	21–25	20–25	16–25			57–75	Report
30 May	15:30	Turkey	3–0	Slovenia	25–22	25–15	25–19			75–56	Report
30 May	20:00	Ukraine	2–3	Netherlands	25–22	17–25	20–25	25–23	10–15	97–110	Report
2 Jun	17:00	Netherlands	3–2	Turkey	24–26	25–21	25–22	23–25	15–9	112–103	Report
3 Jun	20:00	Slovenia	3–2	Ukraine	25–20	21–25	21–25	25–23	16–14	108–107	Report
6 Jun	20:00	Ukraine	3–2	Turkey	31–29	23–25	23–25	25–19	15–11	117–109	Report
6 Jun	20:00	Slovenia	1–3	Netherlands	19–25	23–25	25–23	14–25		81–98	Report

==== Pool C ====
Pos	Team	Pld	W	L	Pts	SW	SL	SR	SPW	SPL	SPR	Qualification
1	Portugal	6	5	1	12	15	11	1.364	586	572	1.024	Golden League Final round
2	Finland	6	3	3	10	14	12	1.167	580	574	1.010	
3	Spain	6	2	4	7	11	13	0.846	542	562	0.964	
4	Czech Republic (Note: Qualified as hosts) (H)	6	2	4	7	10	14	0.714	548	548	1.000	Golden League Final round

(H) Host
Notes:

Date	Time		Score		Set 1	Set 2	Set 3	Set 4	Set 5	Total	Report
19 May	15:00	Portugal	3–1	Spain	25–18	25–20	22–25	25–22		97–85	Report
19 May	19:00	Finland	3–0	Czech Republic	25–20	25–20	27–25			77–65	Report
23 May	20:00	Czech Republic	1–3	Finland	23–25	25–21	19–25	21–25		88–96	Report
23 May	20:45	Spain	3–0	Portugal	27–25	25–17	29–27			81–69	Report
26 May	19:00	Finland	2–3	Portugal	25–17	15–25	19–25	25–21	13–15	97–103	Report
26 May	19:00	Czech Republic	3–1	Spain	25–13	25–18	19–25	27–25		96–81	Report
30 May	18:00	Czech Republic	2–3	Portugal	25–19	25–19	27–29	21–25	13–15	111–107	Report
30 May	19:30	Finland	3–2	Spain	25–23	22–25	25–20	21–25	15–11	108–104	Report
3 Jun	18:00	Spain	1–3	Czech Republic	25–22	24–26	21–25	21–25		91–98	Report
3 Jun	17:00	Portugal	3–2	Finland	25–22	21–25	25–21	28–30	15–10	114–108	Report
6 Jun	18:30	Portugal	3–1	Czech Republic	19–25	27–25	25–21	25–19		96–90	Report
6 Jun	20:45	Spain	3–1	Finland	31–29	25–22	19–25	25–18		100–94	Report

=== Silver League ===
- The Silver League Final Round hosts Macedonia, the winners of each pool and the best second team among all pools will qualify for the Silver League Final Round.

==== Pool A ====
Pos	Team	Pld	W	L	Pts	SW	SL	SR	SPW	SPL	SPR	Qualification
1	Latvia	6	6	0	17	18	3	6.000	511	397	1.287	Silver League Final round
2	Austria	6	4	2	13	15	8	1.875	545	477	1.143	
3	Macedonia (Note: Qualified as hosts) (H)	6	2	4	6	8	13	0.615	475	481	0.988	Silver League Final round
4	Kosovo	6	0	6	0	1	18	0.056	294	470	0.626	

(H) Host
Notes:

Date	Time		Score		Set 1	Set 2	Set 3	Set 4	Set 5	Total	Report
19 May	17:30	Austria	1–3	Latvia	21–25	25–21	17–25	22–25		85–96	Report
20 May	16:30	Kosovo	1–3	Macedonia	25–20	16–25	17–25	14–25		72–95	Report
23 May	17:30	Kosovo	0–3	Austria	18–25	12–25	17–25			47–75	Report
23 May	19:30	Latvia	3–0	Macedonia	25–17	25–16	25–19			75–52	Report
26 May	18:00	Latvia	3–0	Kosovo	25–12	25–8	25–14			75–34	Report
27 May	20:30	Macedonia	1–3	Austria	18–25	25–22	20–25	31–33		94–105	Report
30 May	17:00	Kosovo	0–3	Latvia	21–25	9–25	20–25			50–75	Report
30 May	20:15	Austria	3–1	Macedonia	25–20	23–25	26–24	25–20		99–89	Report
2 Jun	20:15	Austria	3–0	Kosovo	25–11	25–12	25–20			75–43	Report
3 Jun	20:15	Macedonia	0–3	Latvia	26–28	27–29	17–25			70–82	Report
6 Jun	19:30	Latvia	3–2	Austria	25–23	25–20	20–25	23–25	15–13	108–106	Report
6 Jun	20:15	Macedonia	3–0	Kosovo	25–17	25–10	25–21			75–48	Report

==== Pool B ====
Pos	Team	Pld	W	L	Pts	SW	SL	SR	SPW	SPL	SPR	Qualification
1	Belarus	6	5	1	15	16	4	4.000	474	390	1.215	Silver League Final round
2	Croatia	6	5	1	14	16	6	2.667	513	423	1.213	Silver League Final round
3	Albania	6	1	5	5	7	16	0.438	478	544	0.879	
4	Hungary	6	1	5	2	4	17	0.235	397	505	0.786	

Date	Time		Score		Set 1	Set 2	Set 3	Set 4	Set 5	Total	Report
19 May	20:00	Croatia	3–0	Hungary	25–12	25–16	25–14			75–42	Report
20 May	18:00	Belarus	3–0	Albania	25–23	25–23	25–21			75–67	Report
23 May	16:00	Hungary	1–3	Albania	25–22	21–25	21–25	23–25		90–97	Report
23 May	19:00	Belarus	1–3	Croatia	25–21	17–25	19–25	20–25		81–96	Report
26 May	17:00	Croatia	3–0	Albania	25–15	25–23	25–21			75–59	Report
26 May	19:00	Belarus	3–0	Hungary	25–17	25–18	25–15			75–50	Report
30 May	18:30	Hungary	0–3	Croatia	17–25	19–25	18–25			54–75	Report
30 May	20:00	Albania	0–3	Belarus	17–25	22–25	14–25			53–75	Report
2 Jun	19:00	Albania	2–3	Hungary	26–28	19–25	25–21	29–27	9–15	108–116	Report
2 Jun	20:00	Croatia	1–3	Belarus	25–18	17–25	16–25	21–25		79–93	Report
6 Jun	16:00	Hungary	0–3	Belarus	16–25	12–25	17–25			45–75	Report
6 Jun	20:00	Albania	2–3	Croatia	11–25	18–25	29–27	25–21	11–15	94–113	Report

== Final round ==
=== Silver League ===
- Venue: Boris Trajkovski Sports Center, Skopje, Macedonia
- All times are Central European Summer Time (UTC+02:00).

Semifinals
15 June
Belarus	3
Latvia	0
15 June
Croatia	3
Macedonia	2

Final
16 June
Belarus	1
Croatia	3
3rd place match
16 June
Latvia	3
Macedonia	1

==== Semifinals ====
Date	Time		Score		Set 1	Set 2	Set 3	Set 4	Set 5	Total	Report
15 Jun	17:00	Belarus	3–0	Latvia	25–18	25–22	25–15			75–55	Report
15 Jun	20:00	Croatia	3–2	Macedonia	21–25	22–25	25–22	25–20	15–9	108–101	Report

==== 3rd place match ====
Date	Time		Score		Set 1	Set 2	Set 3	Set 4	Set 5	Total	Report
16 Jun	16:00	Latvia	3–1	Macedonia	25–20	25–16	23–25	28–26		101–87	Report

==== Final ====
Date	Time		Score		Set 1	Set 2	Set 3	Set 4	Set 5	Total	Report
16 Jun	19:00	Belarus	1–3	Croatia	16–25	25–20	24–26	23–25		88–96	Report

=== Golden League ===
- Venue: KV Arena, Karlovy Vary, Czech Republic
- All times are Central European Summer Time (UTC+02:00).

Semifinals
13 June
Estonia	3
Portugal	0
13 June
Turkey	0
Czech Republic	3

Final
14 June
Estonia	3
Czech Republic	0
3rd place match
14 June
Portugal	2
Turkey	3

==== Semifinals ====
Date	Time		Score		Set 1	Set 2	Set 3	Set 4	Set 5	Total	Report
13 Jun	16:00	Estonia	3–0	Portugal	26–24	26–24	25–18			77–66	Report
13 Jun	19:00	Turkey	0–3	Czech Republic	22–25	25–27	20–25			67–77	Report

==== 3rd place match ====
Date	Time		Score		Set 1	Set 2	Set 3	Set 4	Set 5	Total	Report
14 Jun	16:00	Portugal	2–3	Turkey	16–25	25–21	14–25	25–22	11–15	91–108	Report

==== Final ====
Date	Time		Score		Set 1	Set 2	Set 3	Set 4	Set 5	Total	Report
14 Jun	19:00	Estonia	3–0	Czech Republic	25–21	25–22	25–21			75–64	Report

== Final standing ==
Rank	Team
1st place, gold medalist(s)	Estonia
2nd place, silver medalist(s)	Czech Republic
3rd place, bronze medalist(s)	Turkey
4	Portugal
5	Netherlands
6	Belgium
7	Finland
8	Ukraine
9	Spain
10	Sweden
11	Slovakia
12	Slovenia
13	Croatia
14	Belarus
15	Latvia
16	Macedonia
17	Austria
18	Albania
19	Hungary
20	Kosovo

Qualified for the 2018 Challenger Cup
Qualified for the 2018 Challenger Cup as hosts

2018 European League champions

Estonia
2nd title

14-man Roster for Golden League Final Round
Robert Viiber, Kert Toobal, Renee Teppan, Karli Allik, Robert Täht, Silver Maar, Oliver Venno, Kristo Kollo, Rait Rikberg, Timo Tammemaa, Rauno Tamme, Andri Aganits, Mart Naaber, Markkus Keel
Head coach
Gheorghe Creţu

== Awards ==
- Most valuable player
  (Estonia) Renee Teppan
- Best setter
  (Estonia) Kert Toobal
- Best outside spikers
  (Estonia) Oliver Venno
  (Czech Republic) Donovan Džavoronok
- Best middle blockers
  (Turkey) Vahit Emre Savas
  (Estonia) Andri Aganits
- Best opposite spiker
  (Czech Republic) Michal Finger
- Best libero
  (Czech Republic) Milan Monik

== See also ==
- 2018 Women's European Volleyball League
