= Meelis Kivisild =

Estonian volleyball player (born 1990)

Personal information
- Nationality: Estonian
- Born: July 28, 1990 (age 36)
- Height: 199 cm (6 ft 6 in)
- Weight: 85 kg (187 lb)
- Spike: 332 cm (131 in)
- Block: 317 cm (125 in)

Volleyball information
- Position: Middle-blocker

National team
Estonia

Meelis Kivisild (born 28 July 1990) is an Estonian volleyball player. He was a member of the Estonian national team from 2011 to 2015 and represented his country at the 2011 European Volleyball Championships.

He started his professional career in club Selver Tallinn.
