= Andres Toode =

Estonian volleyball player and coach

Andres Toode (born 23 July 1957) is an Estonian volleyballer and coach.

He was born in Tartu. In 1982 he graduated from the University of Tartu's Institute of Physical Education.

He began his volleyball career in 1967, coached by Taavo Veski and Henno Linna. In 1978 he was a member of Estonia men's national volleyball team.

In 1994 he was the coach of the club Tartumaa Stella. 1998–1999 he coached the club Ösel Foods. 2000-2001 he was the head coach of Estonian national volleyball team. 2017–2019 he was the head coach of the club Rakvere Võrkpalliklubi.
