= Kert Toobal =

Estonian volleyball player

Personal information
- Nationality: Estonian
- Born: 3 June 1979 (age 47); Türi, Estonia
- Height: 1.89 m (6 ft 2 in)
- Weight: 78 kg (172 lb)
- Spike: 345 cm (136 in)
- Block: 325 cm (128 in)

Volleyball information
- Position: Setter

Career
Years	Teams
1996–1998; 1998–2002; 2002–2004; 2004–2005; 2005; 2005–2007; 2007–2008; 2008–2009; 2009–2010; 2010–2011; 2011–2013; 2013–2014; 2014–2015; 2015–2018; 2018–2019; 2019–2022	(Estonia) Heres Paide (Estonia) ESS Falck Pärnu (Estonia) Sylvester Tallinn (France) Stade Poitevin Poitiers (France) Gazélec Ajaccio (Finland) Salon Piivolley (Belgium) Par-Ky Menen (Estonia) Pere Leib Tartu (France) Foyer Laïque Saint-Quentin (Poland) Indykpol AZS Olsztyn (Turkey) Sivas 4 Eylül (Turkey) Gümüshane Torul Genclik (Turkey) İnegöl Belediye (France) Rennes Volley 35 (Poland) Cuprum Lubin (Estonia) Bigbank Tartu

National team
2001–2021	Estonia (308 games)
Honours
Men's volleyball
Representing Estonia
European League
Gold medal – first place	2016 Bulgaria
Gold medal – first place	2018 Czech Republic
Challenger Cup
Bronze medal – third place	2018 Portugal
- Last updated: 11 October 2022

Kert Toobal (born 3 June 1979) is a former Estonian volleyball player, a long-term captain of the Estonia men's national volleyball team. After retiring from active sport Toobal took up the sporting director position in the Estonian Volleyball Federation.

== Estonian national team ==
Kert Toobal was a member of the Estonian national team from 2001 to 2021 and represented Estonia at the 2009, 2011, 2015, 2017 and 2019 European Volleyball Championships. With the national team Toobal won the 2016 and 2018 European Volleyball League titles.

== Sporting achievements ==
=== Clubs ===
Baltic League

- 2008/2009 – with Pere Leib Tartu
- 2021/2022 – with Bigbank Tartu

National championship

- 1998/1999 Estonian Championship, with ESS Falck Pärnu
- 1999/2000 Estonian Championship, with ESS Falck Pärnu
- 2000/2001 Estonian Championship, with ESS Falck Pärnu
- 2001/2002 Estonian Championship, with ESS Falck Pärnu
- 2002/2003 Estonian Championship, with Sylvester Tallinn
- 2003/2004 Estonian Championship, with Sylvester Tallinn
- 2005/2006 Finnish Championship, with Salon Piivolley
- 2008/2009 Estonian Championship, with Pere Leib Tartu
- 2020/2021 Estonian Championship, with Bigbank Tartu
- 2021/2022 Estonian Championship, with Bigbank Tartu

National cup

- 1998/1999 Estonian Cup, with ESS Falck Pärnu
- 1999/2000 Estonian Cup, with ESS Falck Pärnu
- 2000/2001 Estonian Cup, with ESS Falck Pärnu
- 2001/2002 Estonian Cup, with ESS Falck Pärnu
- 2005/2006 Finnish Cup, with Salon Piivolley
- 2006/2007 Finnish Cup, with Salon Piivolley
- 2008/2009 Estonian Cup, with Pere Leib Tartu
- 2015/2016 French Cup, with Rennes Volley 35
- 2019/2020 Estonian Cup, with Bigbank Tartu
- 2020/2021 Estonian Cup, with Bigbank Tartu
- 2021/2022 Estonian Cup, with Bigbank Tartu

=== National team ===
- 2016 European League
- 2018 European League
- 2018 Challenger Cup

=== Individual ===
- 2004 Estonian Volleyball Player of the Year
- 2015 Estonian Volleyball Player of the Year
- 2016 French Ligue B – Most Valuable Player
- 2016 European League – Best Setter
- 2018 European League – Best Setter
- 2022 Baltic League – Most Valuable Player
- 2022 Estonian League – Best Setter

=== State awards ===
- 2018 Order of the White Star, 4th Class

== Personal life ==
Kert Toobal is the older brother of former Estonia men's national volleyball teammate Andres Toobal.
