= Avo Keel =

Estonian volleyball player and coach (born 1962)

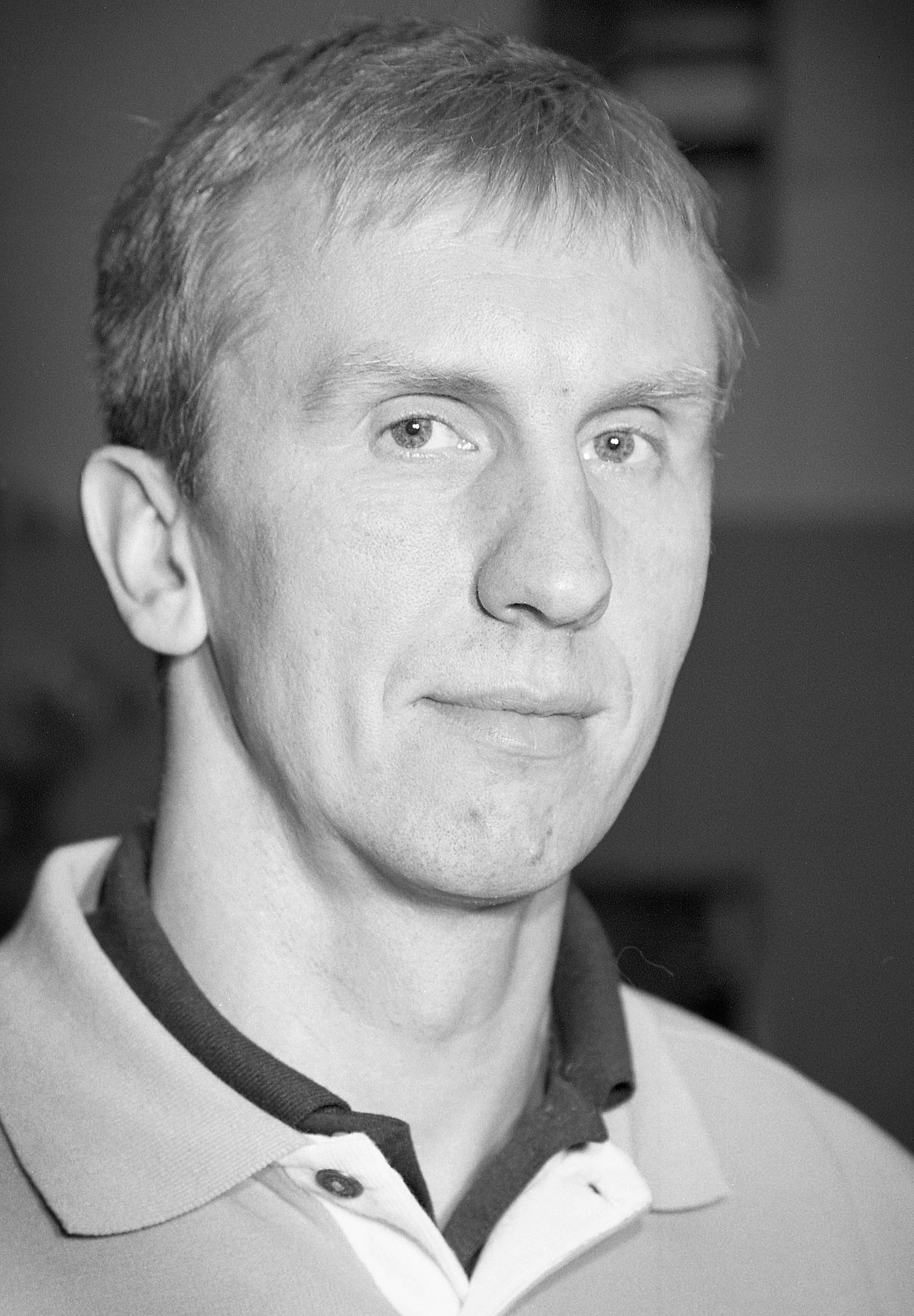
- Avo Keel in 1999

Personal information
- Full name: Avo Keel
- Nationality: Estonian
- Born: October 1, 1962 (age 64); Võru, then part of Estonian SSR, Soviet Union
- Height: 1.92 m (6 ft 3 1/2 in)
- Weight: 89 kg (196 lb)

Coaching information
- Current team: Estonia (assistant); Saaremaa VK (youth)
Previous teams coached
Years	Teams
2004–2014; 2005–2014; 2014–2022; 2017–2021; 2022–2023	Estonia; Selver Tallinn; Pärnu; Latvia (Finland) WoVo Rovaniemi

Beach volleyball information
Years	Teammate
1989–1999; 2000	Kaido Kreen; Valeri Aleksejev

Indoor volleyball information
- Position: setter

Career
Years	Teams
1981–1982; 1987–1988; 1989–1990; 1990–1991; 1991–1995; 1995–1999; 1999–2004	(Soviet Union) Tallinna Autobussipark (Soviet Union) Tallinna Autobussikoondis (Soviet Union) Tallinna Silikaat (Finland) Kalajoen Lentopallo (Finland) Kuopio Pallavolo (Finland) Napapiirin Palloketut (Estonia) ESS Falck Pärnu

National team
1990; 1993–1999; 1993–2003	Soviet Union (beach); Estonia (beach); Estonia (67 games)
- Last updated: 7 April 2022

Avo Keel (born 1 October 1962) is an Estonian volleyball coach and former player.

== Sporting achievements ==
=== As player ===
==== Clubs ====
National championship

- 1981/1982 Estonian SSR Championship, with Tallinna Autobussipark
- 1987/1988 Estonian SSR Championship, with Tallinna Autobussikoondis
- 1988/1989 Estonian SSR Championship, with Tallinna Silikaat
- 1989/1990 Estonian SSR Championship, with Tallinna Silikaat
- 1998/1999 Finnish Championship, with Napapiirin Palloketut
- 1999/2000 Estonian Championship, with ESS Pärnu
- 2000/2001 Estonian Championship, with ESS Pärnu
- 2001/2002 Estonian Championship, with ESS Pärnu
- 2002/2003 Estonian Championship, with ESS Pärnu
- 2003/2004 Estonian Championship, with ESS Falck Pärnu

National cup

- 1999/2000 Estonian Cup 1999, with ESS Pärnu
- 2000/2001 Estonian Cup 2000, with ESS Pärnu
- 2001/2002 Estonian Cup 2001, with ESS Pärnu
- 2002/2003 Estonian Cup 2002, with ESS Pärnu
- 2003/2004 Estonian Cup 2003, with ESS Falck Pärnu

==== Beach ====
- 1989 Soviet Union Championship, with Kaido Kreen
- 1990 Soviet Union Championship, with Kaido Kreen
- 1994 Estonian Championship, with Kaido Kreen
- 1995 Estonian Championship, with Kaido Kreen
- 1996 Estonian Championship, with Kaido Kreen
- 1998 Estonian Championship, with Kaido Kreen
- 1999 Estonian Championship, with Kaido Kreen
- 2000 Estonian Championship, with Valeri Aleksejev

==== Individual ====
- 1993 Estonian Volleyball Player of the Year
- 1994 Estonian Volleyball Player of the Year
- 1998 Finnish League – All-Star
- 1999 Finnish League – All-Star
- 1999 Finnish League – Most Valuable Player

=== As coach ===
==== Clubs ====
Baltic League

- 2006/2007, with Selver Tallinn
- 2007/2008, with Selver Tallinn
- 2008/2009, with Selver Tallinn
- 2009/2010, with Selver Tallinn
- 2010/2011, with Selver Tallinn
- 2011/2012, with Selver Tallinn
- 2013/2014, with Selver Tallinn
- 2015/2016, with Pärnu
- 2016/2017, with Pärnu
- 2017/2018, with Pärnu
- 2018/2019, with Pärnu
- 2021/2022, with Pärnu

National championship

- 2005/2006 Estonian Championship, with Selver Tallinn
- 2006/2007 Estonian Championship, with Selver Tallinn
- 2007/2008 Estonian Championship, with Selver Tallinn
- 2008/2009 Estonian Championship, with Selver Tallinn
- 2009/2010 Estonian Championship, with Selver Tallinn
- 2010/2011 Estonian Championship, with Selver Tallinn
- 2011/2012 Estonian Championship, with Selver Tallinn
- 2012/2013 Estonian Championship, with Selver Tallinn
- 2013/2014 Estonian Championship, with Selver Tallinn
- 2014/2015 Estonian Championship, with Pärnu
- 2015/2016 Estonian Championship, with Pärnu
- 2016/2017 Estonian Championship, with Pärnu
- 2017/2018 Estonian Championship, with Pärnu
- 2018/2019 Estonian Championship, with Pärnu
- 2021/2022 Estonian Championship, with Pärnu

National cup

- 2006/2007 Estonian Cup 2006, with Selver Tallinn
- 2007/2008 Estonian Cup 2007, with Selver Tallinn
- 2008/2009 Estonian Cup 2008, with Selver Tallinn
- 2009/2010 Estonian Cup 2009, with Selver Tallinn
- 2010/2011 Estonian Cup 2010, with Selver Tallinn
- 2011/2012 Estonian Cup 2011, with Selver Tallinn
- 2012/2013 Estonian Cup 2012, with Selver Tallinn
- 2014/2015 Estonian Cup 2014, with Pärnu
- 2015/2016 Estonian Cup 2015, with Pärnu
- 2016/2017 Estonian Cup 2016, with Pärnu
- 2018/2019 Estonian Cup 2018, with Pärnu

==== Individual ====
- 2007 Estonian Volleyball Coach of the Year
- 2008 Estonian Volleyball Coach of the Year
- 2009 Estonian Volleyball Coach of the Year
- 2010 Estonian Volleyball Coach of the Year
- 2010 Estonian Coach of the Year
- 2011 Estonian Volleyball Coach of the Year
- 2020 Latvian Volleyball Coach of the Year

=== State awards ===
- 2012 Order of the White Star, 4th Class
