= Rakvere Sports Hall =

Sports venue in Rakvere, Estonia

Rakvere Spordihall
- Kastani Arena
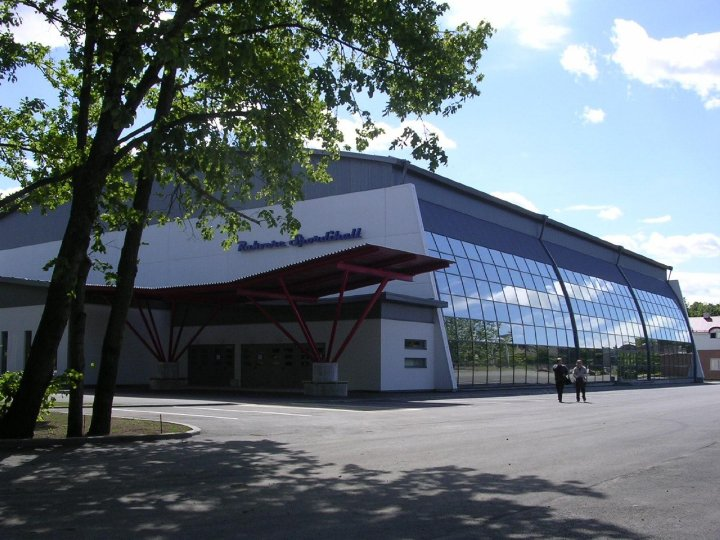
- Rakvere Sports Hall in 2008
- Interactive map of Rakvere Spordihall
- Location: Rakvere, Estonia
- Coordinates: 59°20′41.75″N 26°21′30.55″E
- Owner: Rakvere
- Operator: Town of Rakvere
- Capacity: Concerts: 3,500; Basketball: 2,422
- Field size: 45,4m x 33,15m

Construction
- Groundbreaking: 2003
- Opened: 2004
- Cost: €3,000,000 (50,000,000 EEK)

Tenants
- BC Rakvere Tarvas (KML) (2006–2017); VK Rivaal Rakvere (Schenker League) (2004–2013); Rakvere VK (BMVL) (2013–2019)

The Rakvere Sports Hall (Spordihall) is a multi-purpose arena in Rakvere, Estonia. It opened in 2004 and holds up to 2,422 people during sports events and up to 3,556 during concerts. When it opened, it was the second largest sports arena in Estonia. After the Tondiraba Ice Hall opened in Tallinn in 2014, it fell to third.

The sports hall generally hosts basketball games as well as volleyball games and concerts. Its 1,505 square meters can be divided into three volleyball courts or two basketball courts and a volleyball court. In collaboration with the Estonian National Opera, it hosted La Traviata in 2019, Swan Lake in 2020, and My Fair Lady. Rakvere Stadium is adjacent to the sports hall, and close-by are Rakvere's winter skating rink and summer beach volleyball courts.

The sports hall's attendance record for sporting events is 2,900 fans watching Tartu Rock defeat Rakvere Tarvas 91:46 in the first finals game of the Korvpalli Meistriliiga on 6 June 2010.

== See also ==
- List of indoor arenas in Estonia
