= Estonian Volleyball Championships =

Estonian Volleyball Championships are the national volleyball championships held since 1925 in Estonia.

== Medalists ==
Year	Champion	Second place	Third place
1925	Tallinna Sport	Tallinna Kalev	Tallinna Võitleja
1926	Not held		
1927	Tallinna Kalev	Tallinna NMKÜ	Tallinna Võitleja
1928	Tartu NMKÜ	Tallinna Sport	
1929	Tallinna Kalev	Tartu NMKÜ	Tallinna Sport
1930	Tartu NMKÜ		
1931	Tallinna Kalev		
1932	Tartu NMKÜ		
1933	Tallinna Kalev	Tartu NMKÜ	
1934	Tartu NMKÜ	Tallinna NMKÜ	
1935	Tallinna Kalev	ESS	Tartu NMKÜ
1936	Tallinna Kalev	Tartu NMKÜ	ESS
1937	Tallinna Kalev	Tartu NMKÜ	ESS
1938	Tallinna Kalev	ÜENÜTO	Tartu ASK
1939	Tallinna Kalev	ÜENÜTO	Tartu ASK
1940	Tallinna ÜENÜTO	Tallinna Kalev	ASK
1941	Tallinna Lokomotiiv	Tallinna Dünamo	
1942	Not held		
1943	Tartu ASK		
1944 (EV)	Tallinna Estonia	Tartu Kalev	Tallinna Kalev
1944 (ENSV)	Tallinna Spartak	Tallinna Dünamo	Tartu Dünamo
1945	Tallinna Kalev	Tallinna Dünamo	Tallinna Kalev
1946	Tallinna Kalev	Tallinna Dünamo	Tartu Kalev
1947	Tallinna Kalev	Tartu ÜSK	Tallinna Dünamo
1948	Tallinna Spartak	Tartu Kalev	Tallinna Kalev
1949	Tallinna Spartak	Tallinna Polütehniline Instituut (TPI)	Tallinna Kalev
1950	Tallinna Spartak	Tallinna Polütehniline Instituut (TPI)	Võru Kalev
1951	Tallinna Spartak	Tallinna Dünamo	Tallinna Polütehniline Instituut (TPI)
1952	Tallinna Spartak	Tallinna Kalev	Tallinna Polütehniline Instituut (TPI)
1953	Tallinna Kalev	Tallinna Dünamo	Tallinna Spartak
1954	Tallinna Polütehniline Instituut (TPI)	Tallinna Kalev	Tallinna Spartak
1955	Tallinna Spartak	Eesti Põllumajandusakadeemia I (EPA)	Tallinna Polütehniline Instituut (TPI)
1956	Tallinna Polütehniline Instituut (TPI)	Tartu Riiklik Ülikool (TRÜ)	Eesti Põllumajandusakadeemia I (EPA)
1957	Tallinna Polütehniline Instituut (TPI)	Tallinna Karamell	Eesti Põllumajandusakadeemia I (EPA)
1958	Tallinna Spartak	Tallinna Polütehniline Instituut (TPI)	BLTSK
1959	Trammi- ja Trollibussi Trust (TTT)	Eesti Põllumajandusakadeemia I (EPA)	Tallinna Pedagoogiline Instituut (TpedI)
1960	Tallinna Pedagoogiline Instituut (TpedI)	Trammi- ja Trollibussi Trust (TTT)	Eesti Põllumajandusakadeemia I (EPA)
1961	Tallinna Pedagoogiline Instituut (TpedI)	Trammi- ja Trollibussi Trust (TTT)	Tartu Riiklik Ülikool (TRÜ)
1962	Tallinna Kalev	Tallinna Pedagoogiline Instituut (TpedI)	Tallinna TTV
1963	Tallinna Kalev	Tallinna Pedagoogiline Instituut (TpedI)	Tallinna Polütehniline Instituut (TPI)
1964	Tallinna Polütehniline Instituut (TPI)	Tallinna Kalev	Tallinna Dünamo
1965	Tallinna Kalev	Tallinna Polütehniline Instituut (TPI)	Viljandi Jõud
1966	Tallinna Kalev	Tallinna Polütehniline Instituut (TPI)	Tallinna Dünamo
1967	Tallinna Kalev	Tallinna Polütehniline Instituut (TPI)	Viljandi Jõud
1968	Tallinna Kalev	Tallinna Dünamo	Tallinna Polütehniline Instituut (TPI)
1969	Noorus	Tallinna Dünamo	Viljandi Jõud
1970	Kontroll-Mõõduriistade Katsetehas	Tallinna Dünamo	Kingissepa
1971	Tallinna Kalev	Kingissepa	Tallinna Pedagoogiline Instituut (TpedI)
1972	Maardu Kalev	Tallinna Dünamo	Pärnu KEK
1973	Tallinna Dünamo	Maardu Kalev	ENSV juuniorid
1974	Tallinna Polütehniline Instituut (TPI)	Maardu Kalev	Kirovi nim. Näidiskalurikolhoos (NKK)
1975	Tallinna Kalev/TpedI	Pärnu KEK	Kirovi nim. NKK
1976	Kirovi nim. NKK	Pärnu KEK	Tallinna Kalev/TpedI
1977	Tallinna Autoveod	Tallinna Polütehniline Instituut (TPI)	Pärnu KEK
1978	Pärnu KEK	Kirovi nim. NKK	Tallinna Pedagoogiline Instituut (TpedI)
1979	Pärnu KEK	Tallinna Autoveod	Kirovi nim. NKK
1980	Tallinna Autoveod	Pärnu KEK	Vinni Näidissohvoostehnikum (NST)
1981	Tallinna Autoveod	Tallinna Autobussipark	Vinni Näidissohvoostehnikum (NST)
1982	Tallinna Autobussipark	Vinni Näidissohvoostehnikum (NST)	Pärnu KEK
1983	Vinni Näidissohvoostehnikum (NST)	Tallinna Autobussipark	Tallinna Polütehniline Instituut (TPI)
1984	Tallinna Autobussipark	Tallinna Polütehniline Instituut (TPI)	Vinni Näidissohvoostehnikum (NST)
1985	Tallinna Autobussikoondis (TAK)	Tallinna Polütehniline Instituut (TPI)	Vinni Näidissohvoostehnikum (NST)
1986	Tallinna Autobussikoondis (TAK)	Vinni Näidissohvoostehnikum (NST)	Kalevi juuniorid
1987	Vinni Näidissohvoostehnikum (NST)	Tallinna Autobussikoondis (TAK)	Pärnu KEK
1988	Tallinna Autobussikoondis (TAK)	Pärnu KEK	Vinni Näidissohvoostehnikum (NST)
1989	Tallinna Silikaat	Tallinna Autobussikoondis (TAK)	Pärnu KEK
1990	Tallinna Autobussikoondis (TAK)	Tallinna Silikaat	Pärnu KEK
1991	Pärnu KEK	Vinni Näidissohvoostehnikum (NST)	Tallinna Silikaat/Liider
1992	Vinni Võrkpalliklubi	Tallinna Silikaat/Liider	Pärnu KEK
1993	Pärnu Võrkpalliklubi	Rivaal Rakvere	Tallinna Liider
1994	Tallinna Liider	Pärnu VK Jart	Rivaal Rakvere
1995	Rivaal Rakvere	Pärnu VK Jart	Tallinna Liider
1996	Rivaal Rakvere	Pärnu VK Jart	Tartumaa Fortuuna Loto
1997	Rivaal Rakvere	Pärnu Võrkpalliklubi	Tallinna Palling
1998	Tartu Ösel Foods	Viljandi Volle	Rivaal Rakvere
1999	Tartu Ösel Foods	ESS Pärnu Võrkpalliklubi	Rivaal Rakvere
2000	ESS Pärnu Võrkpalliklubi	Tartu Pere Leib	Rivaal Rakvere
2001	ESS Pärnu Võrkpalliklubi	Tartu Pere Leib/Cibus	Audentese ÜK/Hermann Reisid
2002	ESS Pärnu Võrkpalliklubi	Tartu Pere Leib/Cibus	Tallinna Sylvester
2003	ESS Pärnu VK	Tartu Pere Leib/Cibus	Sylvester
2004	ESS Falck Pärnu VK	Sylvester	Tartu Pere Leib
2005	Audentese Ülikool	Tartu Pere Leib	Sylvester
2006	Tartu Pere Leib	Selver/Audentes University	Sylvester
2007	Selver	Tartu Pere Leib	Falck Pärnu VK
2008	VK Selver Tallinn	Tartu Pere Leib	Pärnu VK
2009	VK Selver Tallinn	Tartu Pere Leib	Pärnu VK
2010	VK Selver Tallinn	Pärnu Võrkpalliklubi	Tartu Pere Leib
2011	VK Selver Tallinn	Tartu Pere Leib	Pärnu Võrkpalliklubi
2012	Tartu Pere Leib	VK Selver Tallinn	Pärnu Võrkpalliklubi
2013	VK Selver Tallinn	Pärnu Võrkpalliklubi	Tartu Pere Leib
2014	Bigbank Tartu	VK Selver Tallinn	Pärnu Võrkpalliklubi
2015	Pärnu VK	Bigbank Tartu	TTÜ
2016	VK Selver Tallinn	Pärnu VK	Rakvere VK
2017	VK Selver Tallinn	Bigbank Tartu	Pärnu VK
2018	Saaremaa VK	Bigbank Tartu	Pärnu VK
2019	Pärnu VK	Bigbank Tartu	Saaremaa VK
2020	cancelled due to the COVID-19 pandemic		
2021	Bigbank Tartu	Saaremaa VK	VK Selver Tallinn
2022	Bigbank Tartu	Pärnu VK	TalTech
2023	TalTech	Bigbank Tartu	Barrus Võru VK
2024	TalTech	Barrus Võru VK	Pärnu VK
2025	Bigbank Tartu	Barrus Võru VK	Pärnu VK
2026	Pärnu VK	Bigbank Tartu	TalTech

== See also ==
- Baltic Men Volleyball League
- Estonian Women's Volleyball Championships
