= Janis Sirelpuu =

Estonian volleyball player and coach

Personal information
- Full name: Janis Sirelpuu
- Nationality: Estonian
- Born: 14 August 1977 (age 49); Rakvere, then part of Estonian SSR, Soviet Union
- Height: 1.97 m (6 ft 5 1/2 in)
- Weight: 92 kg (203 lb)
- Spike: 325 cm (128 in)
- Block: 345 cm (136 in)

Coaching information
- Current team: (Estonia) TalTech
Previous teams coached
| Years | Teams |
|---|---|
| 2012–present | (Estonia) TalTech |

Volleyball information
- Position: middle blocker

Career
| Years | Teams |
|---|---|
| 1993–2000; 2000–2003; 2003–2004; 2004–2005; 2005–2006; 2006–2007; 2007–2009; 2009–2010; 2011–2012 | (Estonia) Rivaal Rakvere (Estonia) Pere Leib Tartu (Estonia) ESS Falck Pärnu (Estonia) Audentes Tallinn (Belgium) Oosthout Torhout (Belgium) Beets Patteet Averbode (Estonia) Selver Tallinn (Estonia) Pärnu (Estonia) TTÜ |

National team
| 1998–2011 | Estonia (154 games) |
- Last updated: 26 April 2022

Janis Sirelpuu (born 14 August 1977, in Rakvere) is a former Estonian volleyball player and a volleyball coach. He was a member of the Estonian national team from 1998 to 2011 and represented his country at the 2009 and 2011 Men's European Volleyball Championships.

Sirelpuu started his professional career in hometown club Rivaal Rakvere and has played in various Estonian clubs during his career. He has also played two seasons in Belgium. After retirement from active playing in 2013 Sirelpuu became the head coach of his last team TTÜ (now rebranded as TalTech).

== Sporting achievements ==
=== As player ===
==== Clubs ====
Baltic League

- 2007/2008 – with Selver Tallinn
- 2008/2009 – with Selver Tallinn

National championship

- 1993/1994 Estonian Championship, with Rivaal Rakvere
- 1994/1995 Estonian Championship, with Rivaal Rakvere
- 1995/1996 Estonian Championship, with Rivaal Rakvere
- 1996/1997 Estonian Championship, with Rivaal Rakvere
- 1997/1998 Estonian Championship, with Rivaal Rakvere
- 1998/1999 Estonian Championship, with Rivaal Rakvere
- 1999/2000 Estonian Championship, with Rivaal Rakvere
- 2000/2001 Estonian Championship, with Pere Leib Tartu
- 2001/2002 Estonian Championship, with Pere Leib Tartu
- 2002/2003 Estonian Championship, with Pere Leib Tartu
- 2003/2004 Estonian Championship, with ESS Falck Pärnu
- 2004/2005 Estonian Championship, with Audentes Tallinn
- 2007/2008 Estonian Championship, with Selver Tallinn
- 2008/2009 Estonian Championship, with Selver Tallinn
- 2009/2010 Estonian Championship, with Pärnu

National cup

- 1995/1996 Estonian Cup, with Rivaal Rakvere
- 1996/1997 Estonian Cup, with Rivaal Rakvere
- 2000/2001 Estonian Cup, with Pere Leib Tartu
- 2001/2002 Estonian Cup, with Pere Leib Tartu
- 2002/2003 Estonian Cup, with Pere Leib Tartu
- 2003/2004 Estonian Cup, with ESS Falck Pärnu
- 2004/2005 Estonian Cup, with Audentes Tallinn
- 2007/2008 Estonian Cup, with Selver Tallinn
- 2008/2009 Estonian Cup, with Selver Tallinn
- 2009/2010 Estonian Cup, with Pärnu

=== As coach ===
==== Clubs ====
Baltic League

- 2012/2013 – with TTÜ
- 2014/2015 – with TTÜ
- 2021/2022 – with TalTech

National championship

- 2012/2013 Estonian Championship, with TTÜ
- 2014/2015 Estonian Championship, with TTÜ
- 2021/2022 Estonian Championship, with TalTech

National cup

- 2013/2014 Estonian Cup, with TTÜ
- 2014/2015 Estonian Cup, with TTÜ
