= Urmas Tali =

Estonian volleyball player and coach

Urmas Tali (born 5 March 1970) is an Estonian volleyball player and coach.

He was born in Võru.

1978–1993 he practised volleyball, coached by Taivo Rohtmaa, Aksel Saal, Andres Skuin and Marianne Karnesk.

Started working as a volleyball coach in 1998. 2005–2008 he coached the club Tartu Pere Leib and in 2008–10 Finnish top-league club Liiga-Riento. 2011–2014 he coached Pärnu Võrkpalliklubi. 2014–2017 he coached Rakvere Võrkpalliklubi and in 2017–2019 Saaremaa VK.

2016–2020 he was a member of the board of Estonian Volleyball Federation.

In 2013, 2016 and 2017 he was named as Best Coach of Estonian Volleyball Federation.
