= Baltic Men Volleyball League =

Volleyball club tournament held between the top clubs from Baltic states

Baltic Men Volleyball League Elme Messer Baltic League
- Most recent season or competition: 2025–26 Baltic Men Volleyball League
- Sport: Volleyball
- Founded: 2005
- First season: 2005–06
- No. of teams: 7
- Country: Estonia; Latvia; Lithuania
- Most recent champions: (Estonia) Bigbank Tartu (6th title)
- Most titles: (Estonia) Selver Tallinn (7 titles)
- Broadcasters: Duo 5, Postimees, SportaCentrs.lv
- Website: Home page (in Estonian)

The Baltic Men Volleyball League, known as the Elme Messer Baltic League for sponsorship reasons, is the top official competition for men's volleyball clubs in the Baltic states.

== History ==
- Schenker League (2005–2015)
- League of Hundred (2015–2016)
- Credit24 Champions League (2016–2022)
- Baltic League (2022–2023)
- Cronimet League (2023–2025)
- Elme Messer Baltic League (2025–present)

== Clubs ==
The following 10 clubs are competing in the Baltic Men Volleyball League during the 2021–22 season.

Team	Location	Arena	Head Coach	Captain
(Estonia) Bigbank Tartu	Tartu	University of Tartu Sports Hall	(Estonia) Alar Rikberg	(Estonia) Kert Toobal
(Estonia) Pärnu	Pärnu	Pärnu Sports Hall	(Estonia) Avo Keel	(Estonia) Markus Uuskari
(Estonia) Selver Tallinn	Tallinn	Audentes Sports Centre	(Estonia) Andres Toobal	(Estonia) Denis Losnikov
(Estonia) TalTech	Tallinn	TalTech Sports Hall	(Estonia) Janis Sirelpuu	(Estonia) Martti Keel
(Latvia) Biolars/Jelgava	Jelgava	Zemgale Olympic Center	(Latvia) Lauris Iecelnieks	(Latvia) Sandis Vilcāns
(Latvia) Daugavpils Universitāte	Daugavpils	Daugavpils Olympic Center	(Latvia) Guntis Atars	(Latvia) Antons Nazarovs
(Latvia) Jēkabpils Lūši	Jēkabpils	Jēkabpils Sporta nams	(Latvia) Mārcis Obrumans	(Latvia) Eriks Voronko
(Latvia) RTU/Robežsardze/Jūrmala	Jūrmala	Jūrmala State Gymnasium SH	(Latvia) Raimonds Vilde	(Latvia) Aleksandrs Avdejevs
(Lithuania) Amber Volley	Gargždai	Sporto rūmai Klaipėda	(Latvia) Austris Štāls	(Ukraine) Dmytro Shlomin

== Finals ==
Year	Finalists			Semi-finalists	
Year	Champion	Score	Runner-up	Third place	Fourth place
2005–06; Details	(Latvia); Ozolnieki (Poliurs/Biolar)	3–1	(Estonia); Tartu (Pere Leib)	(Latvia); Rīga (LU Inčukalns)	(Latvia); Lāse-R Rīga
2006–07; Details	(Estonia); Selver Tallinn	3–2	(Latvia); Lāse-R Rīga	(Latvia); Rīga	(Estonia); Pärnu (Falck)
2007–08; Details	(Estonia); Selver Tallinn	3–1	(Estonia); Tartu (Pere Leib)	(Latvia); Lāse-R Rīga	(Latvia); Kuldīga (Elvi)
2008–09; Details	(Estonia); Selver Tallinn	3–1	(Estonia); Tartu (Pere Leib)	(Latvia); Lāse-R Rīga	(Latvia); Ozolnieki (Biolar)
2009–10; Details	(Estonia); Selver Tallinn	3–0	(Estonia); Tartu (Pere Leib)	(Latvia); Lāse-R Rīga	(Latvia); Ozolnieki (Biolars/Olaine)
2010–11; Details	(Estonia); Selver Tallinn	3–0	(Estonia); Pärnu	(Latvia); Ozolnieki (Poliurs)	(Estonia); Tartu (Pere Leib)
2011–12; Details	(Estonia); Tartu (Pere Leib)	3–2	(Estonia); Selver Tallinn	(Estonia); Pärnu	(Estonia); TTÜ
2012–13; Details	(Estonia); TTÜ	3–2	(Estonia); Pärnu	(Latvia); Lāse-R Rīga	(Estonia); Selver Tallinn
2013–14; Details	(Estonia); Selver Tallinn	3–1	(Estonia); Tartu (Bigbank)	(Latvia); RTU (Robežsardze)	(Estonia); Pärnu
2014–15; Details	(Estonia); Tartu (Bigbank)	3–2	(Estonia); Selver Tallinn	(Estonia); TTÜ	(Estonia); Pärnu
2015–16; Details	(Estonia); Pärnu	3–0	(Latvia); Jelgava (Biolars)	(Latvia); Ozolnieki (Poliurs)	(Estonia); Rakvere
2016–17; Details	(Estonia); Rakvere	3–2	(Estonia); Pärnu	(Estonia); Tartu (Bigbank)	(Estonia); Selver Tallinn
2017–18; Details	(Estonia); Saaremaa	3–2	(Estonia); Pärnu	(Latvia); Jēkabpils Lūši	(Estonia); Rakvere
2018–19; Details	(Estonia); Tartu (Bigbank)	3–2	(Estonia); Saaremaa	(Estonia); Pärnu	(Latvia); RTU (Robežsardze)
2019–20; Details	The season was cancelled after the quarterfinals due to the COVID-19 pandemic in Europe				
2020–21; Details	(Estonia); Selver Tallinn	3–2	(Estonia); Saaremaa	(Latvia); Jēkabpils Lūši	(Estonia); Tartu (Bigbank)
2021–22; Details	(Estonia); Tartu (Bigbank)	3–0	(Estonia); TalTech	(Estonia); Pärnu	(Lithuania); Amber Volley
2022–23; Details	(Estonia); Tartu (Bigbank)	3–2	(Latvia); RTU (Robežsardze/Jūrmala)	(Latvia); Ezerzeme/DU	(Estonia); Pärnu
2023–24; Details	(Estonia); Selver/TalTech	3–2	(Estonia); Tartu (Bigbank)	(Latvia); Jēkabpils Lūši	(Latvia); Ezerzeme/DU
2024–25; Details	(Estonia); Tartu (Bigbank)	3–1	(Estonia); Pärnu	(Estonia); Võru (Barrus)	(Latvia); Ezerzeme/DU

=== Titles by club ===
Rank	Club	Titles	Runner-up	Champion Years	Runner-up Years
1.	(Estonia) Selver Tallinn	7	2	2006–07, 2007–08, 2008–09, 2009–10, 2010–11, 2013–14, 2020–21	2011–12, 2014–15
2.	(Estonia) Bigbank Tartu	6	6	2011–12, 2014–15, 2018–19, 2021–22, 2022–23, 2024–25	2005–06, 2007–08, 2008–09, 2009–10, 2013–14, 2023–24
3.	(Estonia) TalTech	2	1	2012–13, 2023–24	2021–22
4.	(Estonia) Pärnu	1	5	2015–16	2010–11, 2012–13, 2016–17, 2017–18, 2024–25
5.	(Estonia) Saaremaa	1	2	2017–18	2018–19, 2020–21
6.	(Latvia) Poliurs/Ozolnieki	1		2005–06	
6.	(Estonia) Rakvere	1		2016–17	
8.	(Latvia) RTU/Robežsardze		2		2006–07, 2022–23
9.	(Latvia) Biolars/Jelgava		1		2015–16

== Titles by country ==
Country	Won	Runner-up	Finals
Estonia	18	16	34
Latvia	1	3	4

== Most valuable player by edition ==
- 2012–13 – (Estonia) Mart Tiisaar
- 2013–14 – (Estonia) Hindrek Pulk
- 2014–15 – (Estonia) Robert Täht
- 2015–16 – (Estonia) Hindrek Pulk
- 2016–17 – (Estonia) Siim Põlluäär
- 2017–18 – (Estonia) Hindrek Pulk
- 2018–19 – (Estonia) Hindrek Pulk
- 2020–21 – (Estonia) Renee Teppan
- 2021–22 – (Estonia) Kert Toobal
- 2022–23 – (Estonia) Timo Lõhmus
- 2023–24 – (France) Valentin Bouleau
- 2024–25 – (Estonia) Valentin Kordas

== See also ==
- Baltic Women's Volleyball League
