= Pärnu Sports Hall =

Sports venue in Pärnu, Estonia

Pärnu Spordihall
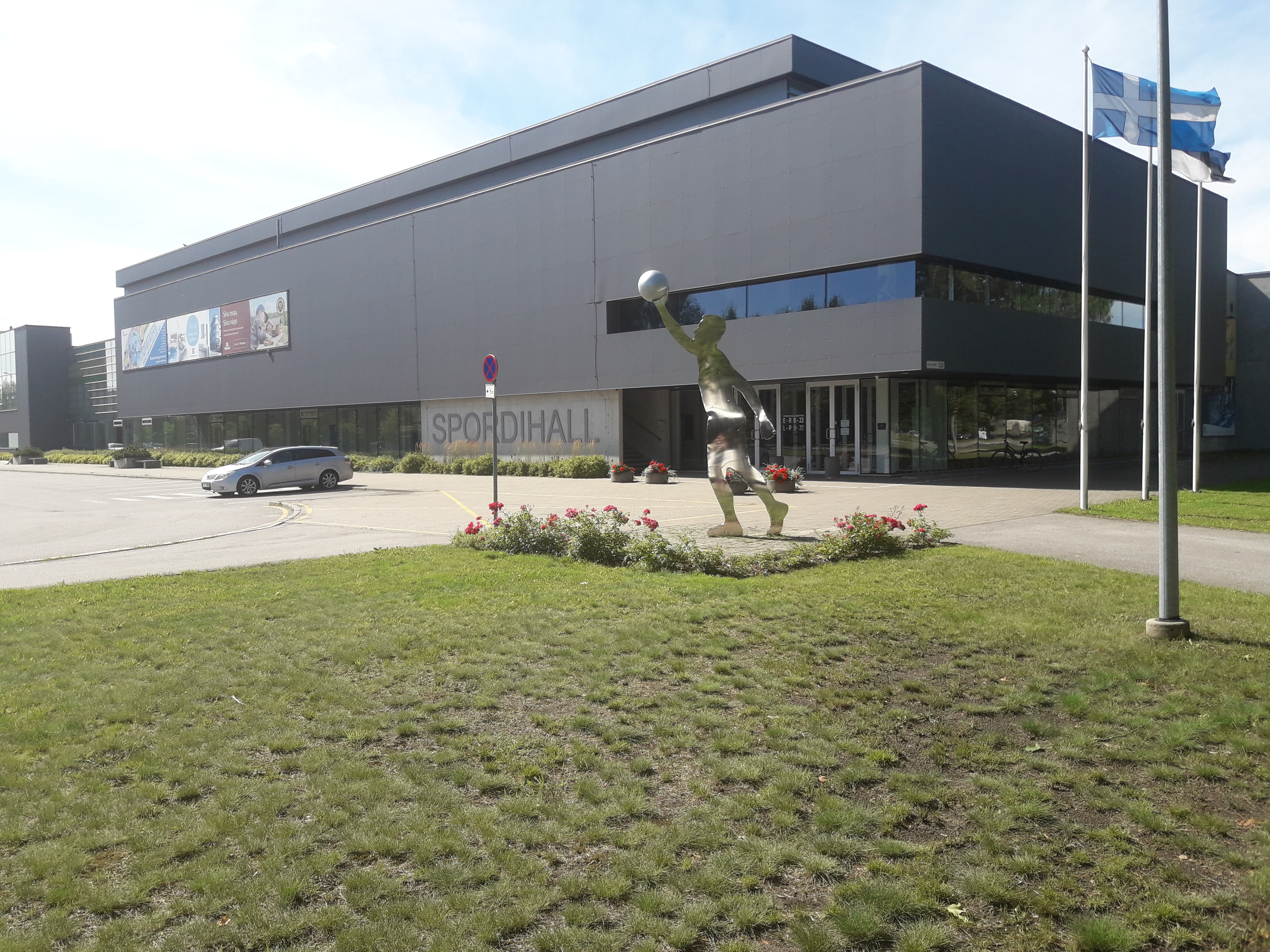
- Interactive map of Pärnu Spordihall
- Location: Riia 129, Pärnu, Estonia
- Coordinates: 58°22′35.31″N 24°31′57.45″E
- Owner: OÜ STENIARD
- Operator: Pärnu Linna Spordikool
- Capacity: Basketball: 1,820

Construction
- Opened: 2009

Tenants
- BC Pärnu (2009–present); Pärnu VK (2009–present)

Website
- Official website

The Pärnu Sports Hall (Estonian: Pärnu Spordihall) is a multi-purpose indoor arena complex in Pärnu. The hall was opened in 2009 and is the current home arena of the Korvpalli Meistriliiga team BC Pärnu and the Baltic Volleyball League team Pärnu VK.
