= Selver x TalTech =

Estonian volleyball club

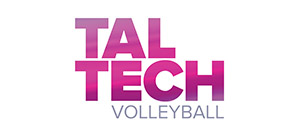
- Full name: Selver x TalTech
- Ground: TalTech Sports Hall, Tallinn (Capacity: 1,000)
- Manager: (Estonia) Janis Sirelpuu
- Captain: (Estonia) Martti Keel
- League: Estonian Volleyball League; Baltic Men Volleyball League; CEV Challenge Cup
- 2020–21: 5th (Estonian League); 7th (Baltic League)
- Website: Club home page

Championships
- 1 Baltic Championship; 1 Estonian Cup

Selver x TalTech (previously TalTech Volleyball) is the volleyball club of Tallinn University of Technology based in Tallinn, Estonia. The team competes in the Baltic Volleyball League and the Estonian Volleyball League.

The team plays its home games at TalTech Sports Hall.

== History ==
The team was founded as TTÜ VK (Tallinna Tehnikaülikooli Võrkpalliklubi), but changed to TalTech in 2018.

== Team ==
=== 2021/2022 ===
Head coach:	(Estonia) Janis Sirelpuu
Assistant:	(Estonia) Uku Rummi

No.	Name	Date of birth	Position
1	(Estonia) Rasmus Meius	April 5, 2002 (age 23)	outside hitter
2	(Estonia) Alari Saar	March 28, 1996 (age 29)	libero
3	(Estonia) Mihkel Tanila	September 30, 1991 (age 34)	middle blocker
5	(Estonia) Martti Keel (C)	January 30, 1992 (age 33)	setter
6	(Estonia) Martin Voit	July 3, 2003 (age 22)	setter
8	(Estonia) Jan Markus Üprus	February 29, 2000 (age 25)	outside hitter
9	(Estonia) Markus Maila	February 27, 2001 (age 24)	setter
11	(Estonia) Kevin Saar	January 15, 1995 (age 31)	outside hitter
12	(Estonia) Remo Torn	March 21, 2003 (age 22)	middle blocker
13	(Czech Republic) Matěj Šmídl	February 25, 1997 (age 28)	opposite
14	(Estonia) Sten Perillus	July 11, 2000 (age 25)	middle blocker
15	(Estonia) Rauno Tamme	April 7, 1992 (age 33)	outside hitter
18	(Estonia) Cris Karlis Lepp	July 25, 1998 (age 27)	libero
20	(Australia) Beau Graham	April 17, 1994 (age 31)	middle blocker

Team roster – season 2020/2021
No.	Name	Date of birth	Position
1	(Estonia) Rasmus Meius	April 5, 2002	outside hitter
2	(Estonia) Jan Solovjov	February 5, 2001	opposite
3	(Estonia) Mihkel Tanila	September 30, 1991	middle blocker
5	(Estonia) Jan Markus Üprus	February 29, 2000	libero
6	(Estonia) Aleksander Eerma	August 3, 1995	setter
7	(Estonia) Jörgen Vanamõisa	February 22, 1996	middle blocker
8	(Estonia) Joonas Popman	June 20, 1995	middle blocker
9	(Estonia) Markus Maila	February 27, 2001	setter
11	(Estonia) Janno Õunpuu	June 15, 1994	opposite
12	(Estonia) Remo Torn	March 21, 2003	middle blocker
14	(Estonia) Sten Perillus	July 11, 2000	middle blocker
18	(Estonia) Cris Karlis Lepp	July 25, 1998	libero
19	(Estonia) Karlo Remy Kallend	March 24, 1999	setter
20	(Estonia) Tamur Viidalepp (C)	November 12, 1997	outside hitter
33	(Estonia) Valentin Kordas	December 31, 1998	outside hitter
Head coach: (Estonia) Janis Sirelpuu; Assistant: (Estonia) Uku Rummi; Assistant: (Estonia) Karl Aavik

Team roster – season 2019/2020
No.	Name	Date of birth	Position
1	(Estonia) Rasmus Meius	April 5, 2002	outside hitter
3	(Estonia) Valentin Kordas	December 31, 1998	outside hitter
4	(Estonia) Sten Perillus	July 11, 2000	middle blocker
5	(Estonia) Jan Markus Üprus	February 29, 2000	outside hitter
6	(Estonia) Aleksander Eerma	August 3, 1995	setter
7	(Estonia) Jörgen Vanamõisa	February 22, 1996	middle blocker
8	(Estonia) Joonas Popman	June 20, 1995	middle blocker
10	(Estonia) Andris Õunpuu	February 12, 1984	outside hitter
11	(Estonia) Janno Õunpuu	June 15, 1994	opposite
12	(Estonia) Karl Stamm	October 6, 1997	libero
13	(Estonia) Ragnar Kalde	October 10, 1996	middle blocker
14	(Estonia) Mihkel Nuut (C)	August 29, 1996	opposite
18	(Estonia) Cris Karlis Lepp	July 25, 1998	libero
19	(Estonia) Karlo Remy Kallend	March 24, 1999	setter
20	(Estonia) Tamur Viidalepp	November 12, 1997	outside hitter
Head coach: (Estonia) Janis Sirelpuu; Assistant: (Estonia) Uku Rummi; Assistant: (Estonia) Asko Esna

== Honours ==
Baltic Volleyball League

- Winners (1): 2012–13
