= VK Rivaal Rakvere =

Estonian volleyball club

- Full name: MTÜ Rakvere VK Rivaal/FruitXpress
- Founded: 1990
- Dissolved: 2013
- Ground: Rakvere Spordihall, Rakvere (Capacity: 2400)
- Chairman: (Estonia) Verner Aas
- Manager: (Estonia) Mati Merirand
- League: Estonian Volleyball League; Schenker League
- 2010–11: 5th (Estonian League); 10th (Schenker League)
- Website: Club home page

Uniforms
Home	Away

VK Rivaal Rakvere (Rakvere FruitXpress due to sponsorship reasons) was a professional volleyball team based in Rakvere, Estonia. They play in the Estonian Volleyball League and the Schenker League.

== History ==
VK Rivaal Rakvere was founded in 1990. In the mid-nineties the club completed three-peat, winning three national championships in a row – 1995, 1996 and 1997. In 2001 an Estonian building material supplier Aeroc became the head sponsor for the team. 8 year tenure as a name sponsor ended in 2009 when local businessman Oleg Gross agreed to support the financial part of the team. In the last seasons Rakvere GT has not enjoyed the success they went through in the 1990s. Mati Merirand, who has been the head coach for over 20 years already has won multiple Estonian Championships and Estonian Cups during franchise history.

- 1990–01 VK Rivaal Rakvere
- 2001–09 VK Aeroc Rakvere
- 2009–12 Rakvere Grossi Toidukaubad
- 2012–present Rakvere FruitXpress

== Seasons ==
Season	League	Cup	Schenker	Coach	Roster
1992–93	2nd			Mati Merirand	
1993–94	3rd			Mati Merirand	
1994–95	Champion			Mati Merirand	Teet Viita, Eivo Zuravljov, Kristjan Kurik, Kuido Kuntro, Janis Sirelpuu, Juri Konontshuk, Ivo Järvala, Jaan Rummi, Marko Loide, Laos Lukas
1995–96	Champion	Winner		Mati Merirand	Ivo Järvala, Janis Sirelpuu, Kristjan Kurik, Laos Lukas, Kuido Kontro, Teet Viita, Eivo Zuravljov, Andrus Lehtpuu, Jarmo Neuhaus, Marko Loide, Juri Konontshuk, Jaan Rummi
1996–97	Champion	Winner		Mati Merirand	Andrus Lehtpuu, Marko Loide, Ivo Järvala, Peeter Nirgi, Juri Konontshuk, Jarmo Neuhaus, Eivo Zuravljov, Laos Lukas, Teet Viita, Kristo Meius, Janis Sirelpuu, Kristjan Kurik
1997–98	3rd			Mati Merirand	
1998–99	3rd			Mati Merirand	
1999–00	3rd			Mati Merirand	
2000–01	3rd			Mati Merirand	
2001–02	4th			Mati Merirand	
2002–03	5th			Mati Merirand	
2003–04	5th	1/2 final		Mati Merirand	
2004–05	4th	1/4 final		Mati Merirand	Laos Lukas, Ivo Järvala, Herki Tuus, Andrus Palberg, Mati Murs, Harrys Puusepp, Hendrik Kurik, Eivo Zuravljov, Elia Lulla, Timo Tehvo, Rain Laanemets, Marek Korbelainen, Reimo Rannar, Roman Jelissejev
2005–06	5th	1/2 final	10th	Mati Merirand	Ivo Järvala, Herki Tuus, Andrus Palberg, Mait Murs, Hendrik Kurik, Elia Lulla, Timo Tehvo, Rain Laanemets, Marek Korbelainen, Reimo Rannar, Roman Jelissejev, Martti Juhkami, Raigo Tatrik
2006–07	4th	1/4 final	9th	Mati Merirand	Mait Murs, Reimo Rannar, Andrus Palberg, Hendrik Kurik, Ilmar Mõttus, Timo Laidroo, Elia Lulla, Timo Tehvo, Raigo Tatrik, Martti Juhkami, Hardi Paas, Roman Jelissejev
2007–08	6th	1/2 final	11th	Mati Merirand	Mait Murs, Reimo Rannar, Martti Juhkami, Andrus Palberg, Hendrik Kurik, Ilmar Mõttus, Timo Laidroo, Elia Lulla, Timo Tehvo, Kristjan Kurik, Virko Vantsi, Kaarel Pomerants, Hardi Paas, Roman Jelissejev, Harri Palmar
2008–09	4th	1/4 final	10th	Mati Merirand	Mait Murs, Reimo Rannar, Martti Juhkami, Andrus Palberg, Hendrik Kurik, Ilmar Mõttus, Timo Laidroo, Harri Palmar, Virko Vantsi, Kaarel Pomerants, Andri Leppik, Tanel Uusküla, Roman Jelissejev, Kaspar Pomerants
2009–10	4th	1/2 final	9th	Mati Merirand	Hardi Paas, Reimo Rannar, Tanel Uusküla, Andrus Palberg, Hendrik Kurik, Ilmar Mõttus, Ronald Järv, Harri Palmar, Virko Vantsi, Kaarel Pomerants, Marko Tali, Roman Jelissejev, Kaspar Pomerants, Andri Leppik
2010–11	5th	1/4 final	10th	Mati Merirand	Kaspar Pomerants, Arnold Annus, Ronald Järv, Hardi Talv, Hardi Paas, Reimo Rannar, Tanel Uusküla, Andrus Palberg, Hendrik Kurik, Ilmar Mõttus, Harri Palmar, Virko Vantsi, Kert Rang
2011–12	6th	1/4 final	9th	Mati Merirand	Hardi Paas, Kajar Kivioja, Andrus Palberg, Hendrik Kurik, Ilmar Mõttus, Harri Palmar, Virko Vantsi, Kaarel Pomerants, Mihkel Hiielaid, Sander Konso, Ronald Järv, Robert Viiber, Hardi Talv

=== Honours ===
Estonian League

- Winners: 1995, 1996, 1997
- Runners-up: 1993

Estonian Cup

- Winners: 1996, 1997

== Players ==
=== Current squad ===
Coach: (Estonia) Urmas Tali

Shirt No	Nationality	Player	Birth Date	Height	Position
1	Estonia	Andris Õunpuu	February 12, 1984 (age 42)	194	Universal
2	Estonia	Stefan Kaibald	May 19, 1997 (age 28)	189	Receiver
3	Estonia	Kevin Saar	January 15, 1995 (age 31)	186	Receiver
4	Estonia	Aivar Silm	February 25, 1985 (age 41)	192	Opposite
5	Estonia	Hendrik Kurik	December 6, 1985 (age 40)	197	Middle blocker
6	Estonia	Rauno Tamme	April 17, 1992 (age 33)	187	Receiver
7	Estonia	Karel Ellermaa	July 17, 1993 (age 32)	190	Setter
8	Estonia	Karlis Mesila	February 4, 1993 (age 33)	195	Opposite
9	Estonia	Kaupo Kivisild (C)	September 20, 1987 (age 38)	203	Middle blocker
11	Estonia	Markus Uuskari	April 22, 1997 (age 28)	193	Opposite
13	Estonia	Ronald Järv	May 10, 1993 (age 32)	178	Setter
14	Cuba	Reidel Alfonso Gonzalez Toiran	October 31, 1984 (age 41)	203	Receiver
16	Estonia	Kaspar Pomerants	May 28, 1992 (age 33)	182	Libero
18	Belarus	Siarhei Taras	February 7, 1988 (age 38)	205	Middle blocker
