= 2020–21 Baltic Men Volleyball League =

- League: Baltic Men Volleyball League
- Sport: Volleyball
- Duration: 26 September 2020 – 17 April 2021
- Season champions: (Estonia) Saaremaa

Finals
- Champions: (Estonia) Selver Tallinn
- Runners-up: (Estonia) Saaremaa
- Finals MVP: (Estonia) Renee Teppan (Selver Tallinn)

Baltic Volleyball League seasons
- ← 2019–20 2021–22 →

The 2020–21 Baltic Men Volleyball League, known as Credit 24 Champions League for sponsorship reasons, was the 16th edition of the highest level of club volleyball in the Baltic states.

== Participating teams ==
Location of 2020–21 Baltic Men Volleyball League teams.

The following teams participate in the 2020–21 edition of Baltic Men Volleyball League.

=== Venues, personnel and kits ===
Team	Location	Arena	Head Coach	Captain	Kit manufacturer	Shirt sponsor
(Estonia) Bigbank Tartu	Tartu	University of Tartu Sports Hall	(Estonia) Alar Rikberg	(Estonia) Kert Toobal	Joma	Bigbank
(Estonia) Pärnu	Pärnu	Pärnu Sports Hall	(Estonia) Avo Keel	(Estonia) Martti Keel	Teamshield	EcoBirch
(Estonia) Saaremaa	Kuressaare	Kuressaare Sports Centre	(Greece) Ioannis Kalmazidis	(Estonia) Keith Pupart	Macron	Visit Saaremaa
(Estonia) Selver Tallinn	Tallinn	Audentes Sports Centre	(Estonia) Rainer Vassiljev	(Estonia) Andrus Raadik	Erreà	Selver / Graanul Invest
(Estonia) TalTech	Tallinn	TalTech Sports Hall	(Estonia) Janis Sirelpuu	(Estonia) Tamur Viidalepp	Macron	Optimus Systems
(Latvia) Biolars/Jelgava	Jelgava	Zemgale Olympic Center	(Latvia) Austris Štāls	(Latvia) Aleksandrs Kudrjašovs	Joma	Jelgava
(Latvia) Daugavpils Universitāte	Daugavpils	Daugavpils Olympic Center	(Latvia) Guntis Atars	(Latvia) Dmitrijs Meinerts	Erreà	Daugavpils
(Latvia) Jēkabpils Lūši	Jēkabpils	Jēkabpils Sporta nams	(Latvia) Mārcis Obrumans	(Latvia) Edvīns Skrūders	Macron	Jēkabpils / Optibet
(Latvia) RTU/Robežsardze/Jūrmala	Jūrmala	Jūrmala State Gymnasium SH	(Latvia) Raimonds Vilde	(Latvia) Gatis Garklavs	Erreà	Riga Technical University
(Lithuania) Amber Volley	Gargždai	Sporto rūmai Klaipėda	(Lithuania) Saulius Matikonis	(Ukraine) Dmytro Shlomin	ETX	Arlanga

=== Coaching changes ===
Team	Outgoing coach	Manner of departure	Date of vacancy	Position in table	Incoming coach	Date of appointment
Bigbank Tartu	(Estonia) Andrei Ojamets	Mutual consent	20 April 2020	Pre-season	(Estonia) Alar Rikberg	6 June 2020
Selver Tallinn	(Italy) Alessandro Piroli	Mutual consent	9 June 2020	Pre-season	(Estonia) Rainer Vassiljev	10 June 2020

== Regular season ==
All participating 10 clubs are playing according to the double round robin system.

Pos	Team	Pld	W	L	Pts	SW	SL	SR	SPW	SPL	SPR	Qualification
1	(Estonia) Saaremaa	14	11	3	33	36	16	2.250	1225	1103	1.111	Playoffs
2	(Estonia) Selver Tallinn	14	9	5	28	32	14	2.286	1078	1027	1.050	Playoffs
3	(Estonia) Bigbank Tartu	14	10	4	27	34	22	1.545	1260	1162	1.084	Playoffs
4	(Latvia) RTU/Robežsardze/Jūrmala	14	7	7	22	22	24	0.917	1167	1005	1.161	Playoffs
5	(Latvia) Jēkabpils Lūši	14	8	6	20	24	28	0.857	1128	1161	0.972	Playoffs
6	(Estonia) Pärnu	14	6	8	20	25	27	0.926	1102	1129	0.976	Playoffs
7	(Estonia) TalTech	14	4	10	14	16	32	0.500	985	1117	0.882	Playoffs
8	(Lithuania) Amber Volley	14	1	13	4	10	36	0.278	958	1199	0.799	Playoffs
9	(Latvia) Daugavpils Universitāte (Note: Semi-professional Daugavpils and Jelgava teams withdrew from the competition in January 2021 due to Latvian COVID-19 restrictions implemented on amateur sport.)	0	0	0	0	0	0	—	0	0	—	
10	(Latvia) Biolars/Jelgava	0	0	0	0	0	0	—	0	0	—	

Updated to match(es) played on 3 April 2021. Source: Credit24 Champions League Regular Season

== Playoffs ==
The four winners of each series qualify to the Final four, while the other four teams are eliminated.

Team 1	Agg.	Team 2	Game 1	Game 2	Game 3
Saaremaa (Estonia)	6–0	(Lithuania) Amber Volley	3–1	3–0	
Selver Tallinn (Estonia)	5–1	(Estonia) TalTech	3–2	3–0	
Bigbank Tartu (Estonia)	6–3	(Estonia) Pärnu	0–3	3–0	3–0
RTU/Robežsardze/Jūrmala (Latvia)	1–5	(Latvia) Jēkabpils Lūši	1–3	2–3	

== Final four ==
- Organizer: Saaremaa
- Venue: Kuressaare Sports Centre, Kuressaare, Estonia

Semifinals
(Estonia) Saaremaa	3
(Latvia) Jēkabpils Lūši	1
(Estonia) Selver Tallinn	3
(Estonia) Bigbank Tartu	0

Final
(Estonia) Saaremaa	2
(Estonia) Selver Tallinn	3
3rd place match
(Latvia) Jēkabpils Lūši	3
(Estonia) Bigbank Tartu	0

=== Semifinals ===
Date	Time		Score		Set 1	Set 2	Set 3	Set 4	Set 5	Total	Report
16 Apr	16:00	Saaremaa (Estonia)	3–1	(Latvia) Jēkabpils Lūši	25–21	25–23	29–31	25–22		104–97	Report
16 Apr	19:00	Selver Tallinn (Estonia)	3–0	(Estonia) Bigbank Tartu	25–15	25–18	26–24			76–57	Report

=== 3rd place match ===
Date	Time		Score		Set 1	Set 2	Set 3	Set 4	Set 5	Total	Report
17 Apr	15:00	Bigbank Tartu (Estonia)	0–3	(Latvia) Jēkabpils Lūši	21–25	22–25	23–25			66–75	Report

=== Final ===
Date	Time		Score		Set 1	Set 2	Set 3	Set 4	Set 5	Total	Report
17 Apr	18:00	Saaremaa (Estonia)	2–3	(Estonia) Selver Tallinn	25–21	23–25	25–14	19–25	13–15	105–100	Report

== Final ranking ==
Rank	Team
1st place, gold medalist(s)	(Estonia) Selver Tallinn
2nd place, silver medalist(s)	(Estonia) Saaremaa
3rd place, bronze medalist(s)	(Latvia) Jēkabpils Lūši
4	(Estonia) Bigbank Tartu
5	(Latvia) RTU/Robežsardze/Jūrmala
6	(Estonia) Pärnu
7	(Estonia) TalTech
8	(Lithuania) Amber Volley
9	(Latvia) Daugavpils Universitāte
10	(Latvia) Biolars/Jelgava

2020–21 Baltic Men Volleyball League Champions

7th title

14–man Roster for Final Four
Niko Haapakoski, Renet Vanker, Oliver Orav, Renee Teppan, Mihkel Varblane , Rauno Haidla, Sten Vahtras, Andrus Raadik, Kristo Kollo, Mihkel Nuut, Denis Losnikov, Mathias Külvi, Marx Aru, Helger Hääl
Head coach
Rainer Vassiljev

== Final four awards ==
- Most valuable player
  (Estonia) Renee Teppan (Selver Tallinn)
- Best setter
  (Estonia) Renet Vanker (Selver Tallinn)
- Best outside hitters
  (Latvia) Kristaps Šmits (Jēkabpils Lūši)
  (Estonia) Oliver Orav (Selver Tallinn)
- Best middle blockers
  (Brazil) Wennder Lopes (Saaremaa)
  (Estonia) Mihkel Varblane (Selver Tallinn)
- Best opposite hitter
  (Estonia) Hindrek Pulk (Saaremaa)
- Best libero
  (Estonia) Johan Vahter (Saaremaa)
