= Markkus Keel =

Estonian volleyball player (born 1995)

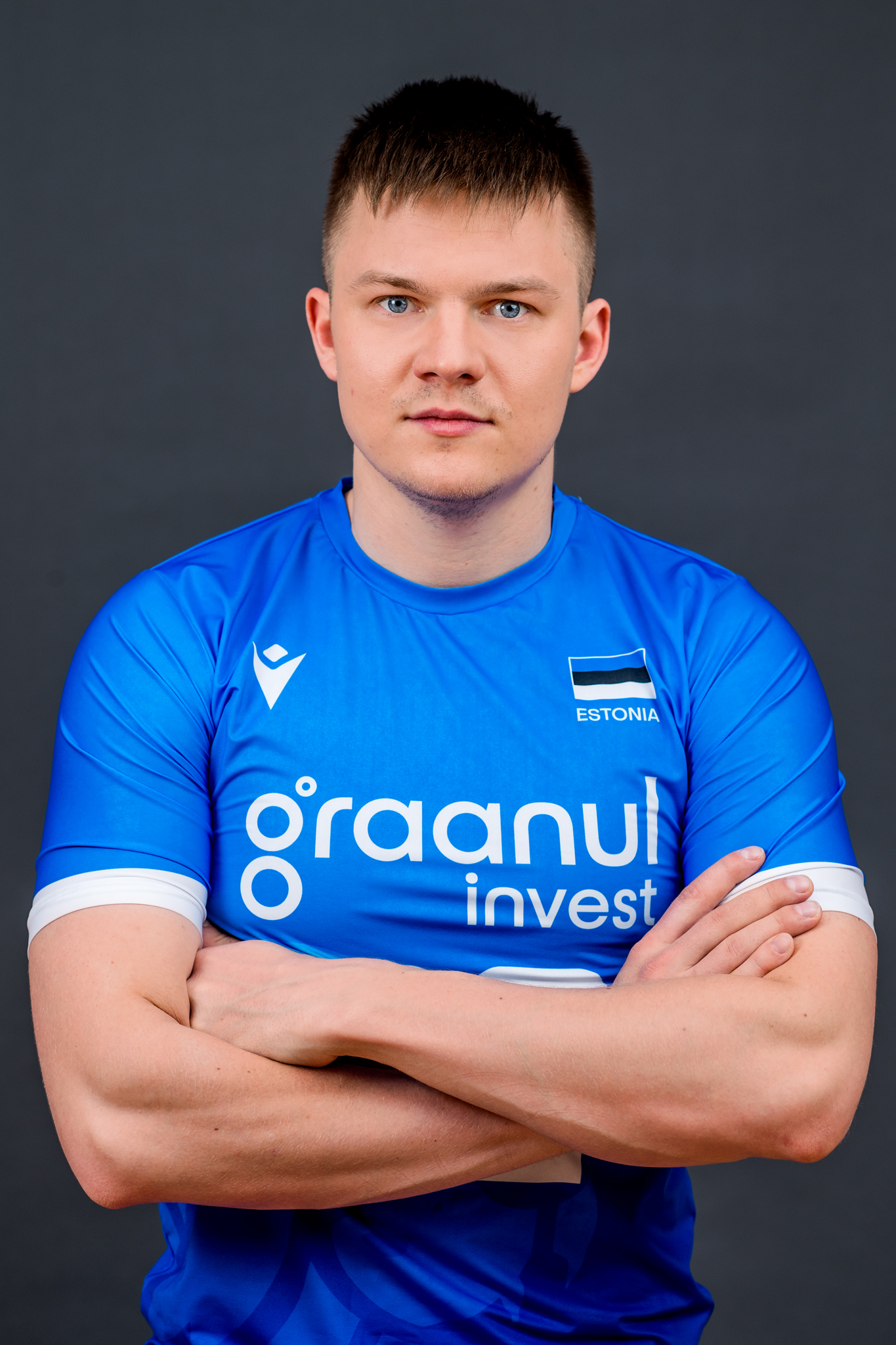
- Markkus Keel in 2022

Personal information
- Nationality: Estonian
- Born: August 18, 1995 (age 31)
- Height: 193 cm (6 ft 4 in)
- Weight: 83 kg (183 lb)
- Spike: 330 cm (130 in)
- Block: 313 cm (123 in)

Volleyball information
- Position: Setter
- Current club: Cherno More BASK

Career
Years	Teams
2012–2013; 2013–2014; 2014–2018; 2018–2019; 2019–2020; 2020–2021; 2021; 2021–2022; 2022–2023; 2023–	(Estonia) Selver Tallinn (Estonia) Danpower Võru (Estonia) Pärnu (Austria) Posojilnica Aich/Dob (Belgium) Lindemans Aalst (Finland) Akaa-Volley (France) Nice Volley-Ball (Iran) Foolad Sirjan (Estonia) Bigbank Tartu (Bulgaria) Cherno More BASK

National team
2017–	Estonia
Honours
Men's volleyball
Representing Estonia
European League
Gold medal – first place	2018 Czech Republic
Challenger Cup
Bronze medal – third place	2018 Portugal

Markkus Keel (born 18 August 1995) is an Estonian volleyball player. He is a member of the Estonian national team since 2017 and represented his country at the 2019 European Volleyball Championship.

He started his professional career in club Pärnu VK.

His father is a volleyball player and coach Avo Keel. His brother is a volleyball player Martti Keel.

== Sporting achievements ==
=== Clubs ===
MEVZA League

- 2018/2019 – with Posojilnica Aich/Dob

Baltic League

- 2015/2016 – with Pärnu
- 2016/2017 – with Pärnu
- 2017/2018 – with Pärnu
- 2022/2023 – with Bigbank Tartu

National championship

- 2012/2013 Estonian Championship, with Selver Tallinn
- 2014/2015 Estonian Championship, with Pärnu
- 2015/2016 Estonian Championship, with Pärnu
- 2016/2017 Estonian Championship, with Pärnu
- 2017/2018 Estonian Championship, with Pärnu
- 2018/2019 Austrian Championship, with Posojilnica Aich/Dob
- 2021/2022 Iranian Championship, with Foolad Sirjan
- 2022/2023 Estonian Championship, with Bigbank Tartu

National cup

- 2014/2015 Estonian Cup, with Pärnu
- 2015/2016 Estonian Cup, with Pärnu
- 2016/2017 Estonian Cup, with Pärnu
- 2019/2020 Belgian Cup, with Lindemans Aalst
- 2022/2023 Estonian Cup, with Bigbank Tartu

=== National team ===
- 2018 European League
- 2018 Challenger Cup
