= Kristjan Õuekallas =

Estonian volleyball player (born 1981)

Kristjan Õuekallas (born 8 January 1981) is an Estonian volleyball player.

He was born in Pärnu.

He began his volleyball career in 1990, coached by Oleg Lazarev. Later his coaches have been Andrei Ojamets, Pasi Rautiainen, Georg Grözer and Avo Keel.

He has played at volleyball club Pärnu VK, and Tallinna Selver. He has also played for several foreign clubs: Rovaniemi Napapiirin Palloketut (Finland), Moerser (Germany) and Beauvais Oise (France). 2003–2013 he was a member of Estonian national volleyball team.
