= Veiko Lember =

Estonian volleyball player (born 1977)

Personal information
- Nationality: Estonian
- Born: 29 November 1977 (age 48) Kuressaare, then part of Estonian SSR, Soviet Union
- Height: 188 cm (6 ft 2 in)

Volleyball information
- Position: setter

Career
- Years: Team
- 1997–1999 1999–2003 2003–2004 2004–2005 2005–2009: (Estonia) Ösel Foods Tartu (Estonia) Pere Leib Tartu (Estonia) ESS Falck Pärnu (Estonia) Audentes Tallinn (Estonia) Selver Tallinn

National team
- Years: Team
- 1998–2009: Estonia (143 games)
- Updated on 19 May 2022

Veiko Lember (born 29 November 1977) is an Estonian volleyball player.

He was born in Kuressaare. In 2002 he graduated from the University of Tartu's Faculty of Social Sciences.

He began his volleyball career in 1985, coached by his mother Marvi Lember. He has played in volleyball club Ösel Foods Tartu, Pärnu VK, Tallinna Audentes, and Tallinna Selver. 1998–2009 he was a member of Estonian national volleyball team.

2006-2016 he worked at Tallinn University of Technology.

== Sporting achievements ==
=== Clubs ===
Baltic League

- 2006/2007 - with Selver Tallinn
- 2007/2008 - with Selver Tallinn
- 2008/2009 - with Selver Tallinn

National championship

- 1997/1998 Estonian Championship, with Ösel Foods Tartu
- 1998/1999 Estonian Championship, with Ösel Foods Tartu
- 1999/2000 Estonian Championship, with Pere Leib Tartu
- 2000/2001 Estonian Championship, with Pere Leib Tartu
- 2001/2002 Estonian Championship, with Pere Leib Tartu
- 2002/2003 Estonian Championship, with Pere Leib Tartu
- 2003/2004 Estonian Championship, with ESS Falck Pärnu
- 2004/2005 Estonian Championship, with Audentes Tallinn
- 2005/2006 Estonian Championship, with Selver Tallinn
- 2006/2007 Estonian Championship, with Selver Tallinn
- 2007/2008 Estonian Championship, with Selver Tallinn
- 2008/2009 Estonian Championship, with Selver Tallinn

National cup

- 1998/1999 Estonian Cup, with Ösel Foods Tartu
- 1999/2000 Estonian Cup, with Pere Leib Tartu
- 2000/2001 Estonian Cup, with Pere Leib Tartu
- 2001/2002 Estonian Cup, with Pere Leib Tartu
- 2002/2003 Estonian Cup, with Pere Leib Tartu
- 2003/2004 Estonian Cup, with ESS Falck Pärnu
- 2004/2005 Estonian Cup, with Audentes Tallinn
- 2006/2007 Estonian Cup, with Selver Tallinn
- 2007/2008 Estonian Cup, with Selver Tallinn
- 2008/2009 Estonian Cup, with Selver Tallinn
