= Ardo Kreek =

Estonian volleyball player

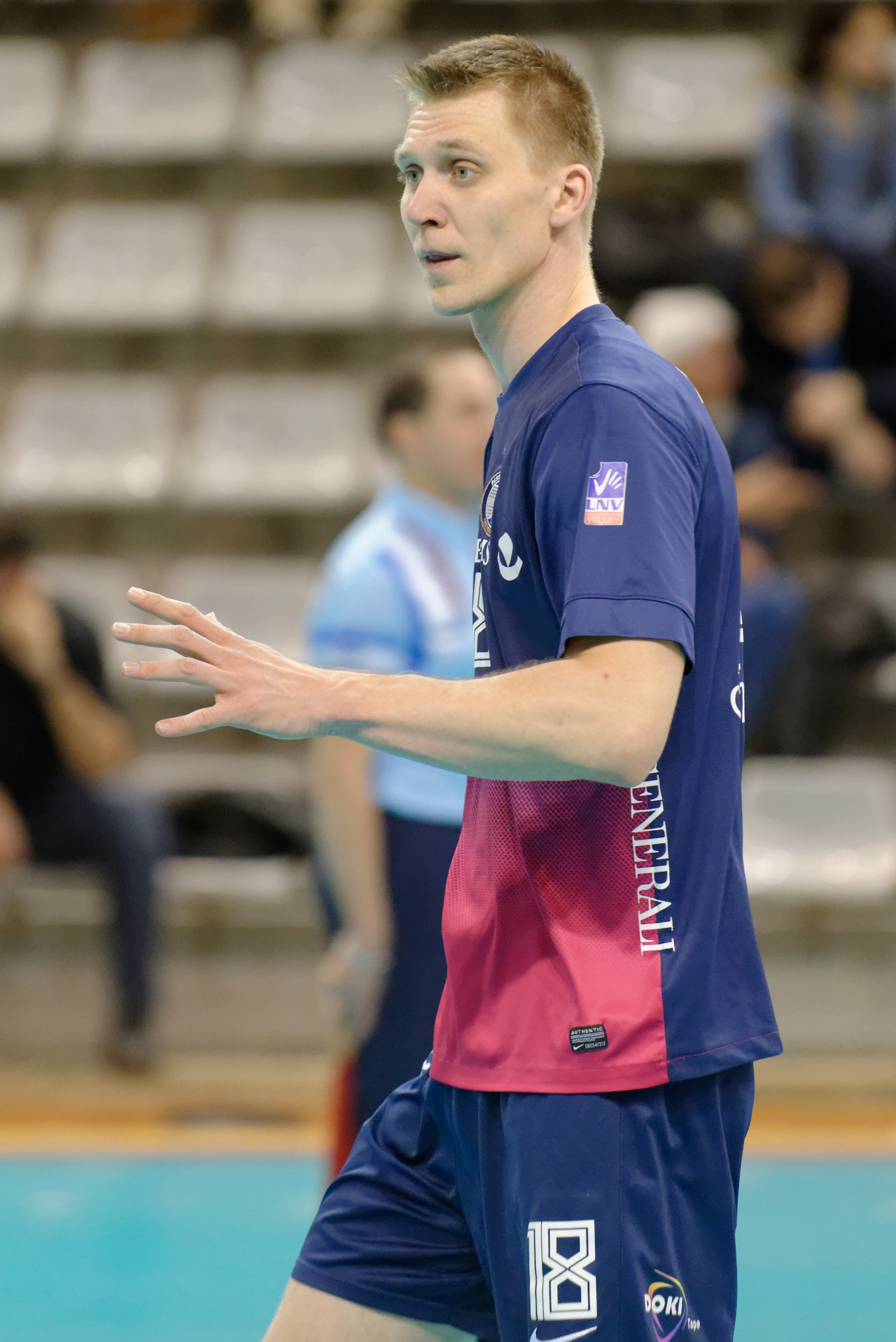
- Ardo Kreek, 2014

Personal information
- Nationality: Estonian
- Born: 7 August 1986 (age 40); Tallinn, then part of Estonian SSR, Soviet Union
- Height: 2.02 m (6 ft 8 in)
- Weight: 100 kg (220 lb)
- Spike: 340 cm (134 in)
- Block: 330 cm (130 in)

Volleyball information
- Position: Middle blocker
- Current club: Nice Volley-Ball

Career
Years	Teams
2003–2006; 2006–2009; 2009; 2009; 2009–2010; 2010–2012; 2012–2020; 2020–2024; 2024–	(Estonia) Sylvester Tallinn (Estonia) Selver Tallinn (France) Rennes Volley 35 (Poland) Asseco Resovia Rzeszów (Poland) Jadar Radom (Poland) AZS Politechnika Warszawska (France) Paris Volley (France) Arago de Sète (France) Nice Volley-Ball

National team
2004–2022	Estonia (244 games)
Honours
Men's volleyball
Representing Estonia
European League
Gold medal – first place	2016 Bulgaria
Bronze medal – third place	2021 Belgium
- Last updated: 5 July 2024

Ardo Kreek (born 7 August 1986) is an Estonian volleyball player, a member of Estonia men's national volleyball team and French club Nice Volley-Ball.

== Club career ==
Kreek was born in Tallinn and started his career in his hometown club Sylvester Tallinn at the age of 17. In 2006 he moved to Estonian powerhouse VK Selver Tallinn where he played for the next three years. With Selver he won the Estonian Championship, the Estonian Cup and the Schenker League title twice. Selver and Kreek also reached to CEV Challenge Cup quarterfinals in 2008.

In the beginning of 2009 Kreek played half a season in France, for Rennes Volley 35. In September 2009 he moved to Poland and signed with PlusLiga top team Asseco Resovia Rzeszów. He left the team in December and joined another Polish team Jadar Radom where he played the rest of the 2009–10 season. Kreek stayed in Poland for the next two seasons playing in the AZS Politechnika Warszawska team. With Politechnika he reached the CEV Challenge Cup finals in 2012 where they lost to another Polish team AZS Częstochowa in the golden set.

In 2012 Kreek signed with French top team Paris Volley. With Paris team he has reached the French Pro A finals four times between 2013 and 2016 winning the French Championship in 2016. Kreek and Paris Volley also won the 2013–14 CEV Cup by defeating Russian team Guberniya Nizhniy Novgorod in the finals. Kreek left Paris after eight seasons and signed with another Pro A team Arago de Sète in Southern France.

== National team ==
Kreek represented the Estonian youth teams in the U18 and U20 level. He is a member of the Estonian national team since 2004 and has represented Estonia at the 2009, 2011, 2015, 2017 and 2019 European Volleyball Championships. With the national team Kreek won the 2016 European Volleyball League title.

== Sporting achievements ==
=== Clubs ===
CEV Cup

- 2013/2014 – with Paris Volley

CEV Challenge Cup

- 2011/2012 – with AZS Politechnika Warszawska

Baltic League

- 2006/2007 – with Selver Tallinn
- 2007/2008 – with Selver Tallinn

National championship

- 2003/2004 Estonian Championship, with Sylvester Tallinn
- 2004/2005 Estonian Championship, with Sylvester Tallinn
- 2005/2006 Estonian Championship, with Sylvester Tallinn
- 2006/2007 Estonian Championship, with Selver Tallinn
- 2007/2008 Estonian Championship, with Selver Tallinn
- 2012/2013 French Championship, with Paris Volley
- 2013/2014 French Championship, with Paris Volley
- 2014/2015 French Championship, with Paris Volley
- 2015/2016 French Championship, with Paris Volley

National cup

- 2006/2007 Estonian Cup 2006, with Selver Tallinn
- 2007/2008 Estonian Cup 2007, with Selver Tallinn
- 2008/2009 Estonian Cup 2008, with Selver Tallinn
- 2013/2014 French SuperCup 2013, with Paris Volley
- 2013/2014 French Cup 2014, with Paris Volley
- 2014/2015 French SuperCup 2014, with Paris Volley
- 2015/2016 French SuperCup 2015, with Paris Volley
- 2016/2017 French SuperCup 2016, with Paris Volley

=== National team ===
- 2016 European League
- 2021 European League

=== Individual ===
- 2013 Estonian Volleyball Player of the Year
- 2014 Estonian Volleyball Player of the Year
- 2015 European League – Best Middle Blocker
- 2019 French Ligue B – Most Valuable Player
- 2019 French Ligue B – Best Middle Blocker
