= Jaanus Nõmmsalu =

Estonian volleyball player (born 1981)

Personal information
- Full name: Jaanus Nõmmsalu
- Nationality: Estonian
- Born: 19 January 1981 (age 45); Pärnu, Estonia
- Hometown: Pärnu
- Height: 2.00 m (6 ft 6 1/2 in)
- Weight: 100 kg (220 lb)
- Spike: 345 cm (136 in)
- Block: 328 cm (129 in)

Volleyball information
- Position: outside hitter

Career
Years	Teams
1997–2004; 2004; 2004–2005; 2005–2006; 2006–2007; 2007–2008; 2008; 2008–2009; 2009; 2009–2010; 2010–2011; 2012; 2012–2014; 2014–2016	(Estonia) ESS Falck Pärnu (France) Spacer's de Toulouse (France) GFCO Ajaccio (Austria) Aon hotVolleys Vienna (France) Avignon Volley-Ball (Greece) P.A.O.K. Thessaloniki (Estonia) Pere Leib Tartu (Czech Republic) DHL Ostrava (Estonia) Selver Tallinn (France) Beauvais OUC (Estonia) Pärnu (Russia) Tyumen (Estonia) TTÜ (Estonia) Pärnu

National team
1999–2013	Estonia (133 games)
- Last updated: 7 December 2016

Jaanus Nõmmsalu (born 19 January 1981) is a former Estonian volleyball player. He was a member of the Estonian national team from 1999 to 2013 and has represented his country at the 2009 and 2011 European Volleyball Championships. Nõmmsalu started his professional career in hometown club ESS Falck Pärnu. He has also played in France, Austria, Greece, Czech Republic and Russia.

== Sporting achievements ==
=== Clubs ===
MEVZA Cup

- 2005/2006 – with Aon hotVolleys Vienna

Baltic League

- 2007/2008 – with Pere Leib Tartu
- 2008/2009 – with Selver Tallinn
- 2010/2011 – with Pärnu
- 2012/2013 – with TTÜ
- 2015/2016 – with Pärnu

National championship

- 1998/1999 Estonian Championship, with ESS Pärnu
- 1999/2000 Estonian Championship, with ESS Pärnu
- 2000/2001 Estonian Championship, with ESS Pärnu
- 2001/2002 Estonian Championship, with ESS Pärnu
- 2002/2003 Estonian Championship, with ESS Pärnu
- 2003/2004 Estonian Championship, with ESS Falck Pärnu
- 2007/2008 Estonian Championship, with Pere Leib Tartu
- 2008/2009 Estonian Championship, with Selver Tallinn
- 2010/2011 Estonian Championship, with Pärnu
- 2012/2013 Estonian Championship, with TTÜ
- 2014/2015 Estonian Championship, with Pärnu
- 2015/2016 Estonian Championship, with Pärnu

National cup

- 1998/1999 Estonian Cup 1998, with ESS Pärnu
- 1999/2000 Estonian Cup 1999, with ESS Pärnu
- 2000/2001 Estonian Cup 2000, with ESS Pärnu
- 2001/2002 Estonian Cup 2001, with ESS Pärnu
- 2002/2003 Estonian Cup 2002, with ESS Pärnu
- 2003/2004 Estonian Cup 2003, with ESS Falck Pärnu
- 2005/2006 Austrian Cup 2006, with Aon hotVolleys Vienna
- 2010/2011 Estonian Cup 2010, with Pärnu
- 2013/2014 Estonian Cup 2013, with TTÜ
- 2014/2015 Estonian Cup 2014, with Pärnu
- 2015/2016 Estonian Cup 2015, with Pärnu
