= Rainer Vassiljev =

Estonian volleyball coach (born 1983)

Rainer Vasssiljev

Personal information
- Full name: Rainer Vassiljev
- Nationality: Estonian
- Born: July 19, 1983 (age 43); Rakvere, then part of Estonian SSR, Soviet Union
- Height: 177 cm (5 ft 10 in)

Coaching information
- Current team: Latvia (M); Pärnu VK
Previous teams coached
Years	Teams
2006–2009; 2009–2013; 2012–2019; 2013–2014; 2014–2017; 2017–2018; 2018–2020; 2020–2021; 2020–2021; 2021–2022; 2022–2023; 2023–2024; 2024– 2024–	Pere Leib Tartu (AC); Pere Leib Tartu; Estonia (AC); Rakvere; Selver Tallinn; TV Schönenwerd; Cuprum Lubin (AC); Estonia (W) (AC); Selver Tallinn; Gwardia Wrocław; Pafiakos; VM Zalău; Latvia (M); Pärnu VK
Honours
Men's volleyball
Representing Estonia
European League
Gold medal – first place	2016 Bulgaria
Gold medal – first place	2018 Czech Republic
Challenger Cup
Bronze medal – third place	2018 Portugal
- Last updated: 21 June 2024

Rainer Vassiljev (born July 19, 1983) is an Estonian professional volleyball coach. He is a head coach of the Latvia men's national volleyball team. On club level he is the current head coach of Pärnu VK of the Estonian Volleyball League and Baltic Men Volleyball League.
