= Raudsepp =

Estonian-language surname

Raudsepp or Raudsep is a common Estonian surname (meaning blacksmith). Notable people with the surname include:

- Andreas Raudsepp (born 1993), Estonian footballer
- Hugo Raudsepp (1883–1952), Estonian playwright
- Jaan Raudsepp (1873–1945), Estonian politician
- Laimons Raudsepp (born 1951), Estonian volleyball player and coach
- Pavo Raudsepp (born 1973), Estonian cross-country skier
- Peeter Raudsepp (born 1970), Estonian business executive and politician
