= Rauno Tamme =

Estonian volleyball player (born 1992)

Personal information
- Full name: Rauno Tamme
- Nationality: Estonian
- Born: 7 April 1992 (age 34); Viljandi, Estonia
- Height: 1.88 m (6 ft 2 in)
- Weight: 78 kg (172 lb)
- Spike: 342 cm (135 in)
- Block: 320 cm (126 in)

Volleyball information
- Position: Outside hitter
- Current club: TalTech
- Number: 15

Career
Years	Teams
2009–2011; 2011–2012; 2012–2016; 2016–2017; 2017–2021; 2021–	(Estonia) Pere Leib Tartu (Estonia) Valio Võru (Estonia) Rakvere (Estonia) Selver Tallinn (Estonia) Saaremaa (Estonia) TalTech

National team
2015–	Estonia
Honours
Men's volleyball
Representing Estonia
European League
Gold medal – first place	2016 Bulgaria
Gold medal – first place	2018 Czech Republic
Challenger Cup
Bronze medal – third place	2018 Portugal
- Last updated: 26 April 2022

Rauno Tamme (born 7 April 1992) is an Estonian volleyball player who plays for the Estonian volleyball club TalTech. He is a member of the Estonia men's national volleyball team.

== Estonian national team ==
As a member of the senior Estonia men's national volleyball team, Tamme competed at the 2015 and 2019 Men's European Volleyball Championships.

== Sporting achievements ==
=== Clubs ===
Baltic League

- 2009/2010 – with Pere Leib Tartu
- 2017/2018 – with Saaremaa
- 2018/2019 – with Saaremaa
- 2020/2021 – with Saaremaa
- 2021/2022 – with TalTech

National championship

- 2009/2010 Estonian Championship, with Pere Leib Tartu
- 2010/2011 Estonian Championship, with Pere Leib Tartu
- 2015/2016 Estonian Championship, with Rakvere
- 2016/2017 Estonian Championship, with Selver Tallinn
- 2017/2018 Estonian Championship, with Saaremaa
- 2018/2019 Estonian Championship, with Saaremaa
- 2020/2021 Estonian Championship, with Saaremaa
- 2021/2022 Estonian Championship, with TalTech
- 2022/2023 Estonian Championship, with Selver x TalTech

National cup

- 2011/2012 Estonian Cup, with Pere Leib Tartu
- 2015/2016 Estonian Cup, with Rakvere
- 2016/2017 Estonian Cup, with Selver Tallinn
- 2017/2018 Estonian Cup, with Saaremaa
- 2018/2019 Estonian Cup, with Saaremaa
- 2019/2020 Estonian Cup, with Saaremaa

=== National team ===
- 2016 European League
- 2018 European League
- 2018 Challenger Cup
