= Martti Rosenblatt =

Estonian volleyball player (born 1987)

Personal information
- Nationality: Estonian
- Born: 29 December 1987 (age 38); Viljandi, then part of Estonian SSR, Soviet Union
- Height: 198 cm (6 ft 6 in)

Volleyball information
- Position: Universal
- Current club: Järvamaa

Career
Years	Teams
2003–2006; 2006–2012; 2012–2013; 2013–2016; 2016–present	(Estonia) Pere Leib Tartu (Estonia) Selver Tallinn (Finland) Kyyjärven Kyky (Estonia) Selver Tallinn (Estonia) Järvamaa

National team
2006–2011	Estonia (72 games)
- Last updated: October 25, 2016

Martti Rosenblatt (born 29 December 1987) is an Estonian volleyball player, who currently plays for Järvamaa.

== Estonian national team ==
As a member of the senior Estonia men's national volleyball team, Rosenblatt competed at the 2009 and 2011 European Volleyball Championships.

== Achievements ==
=== Clubs ===
Baltic League

- 2005/2006 – with Pere Leib Tartu
- 2006/2007 – with Selver Tallinn
- 2007/2008 – with Selver Tallinn
- 2008/2009 – with Selver Tallinn
- 2009/2010 – with Selver Tallinn
- 2010/2011 – with Selver Tallinn
- 2011/2012 – with Selver Tallinn
- 2013/2014 – with Selver Tallinn
- 2014/2015 – with Selver Tallinn

National championship

- 2003/2004 Estonian Championship, with Pere Leib Tartu
- 2004/2005 Estonian Championship, with Pere Leib Tartu
- 2005/2006 Estonian Championship, with Pere Leib Tartu
- 2006/2007 Estonian Championship, with Selver Tallinn
- 2007/2008 Estonian Championship, with Selver Tallinn
- 2008/2009 Estonian Championship, with Selver Tallinn
- 2009/2010 Estonian Championship, with Selver Tallinn
- 2010/2011 Estonian Championship, with Selver Tallinn
- 2011/2012 Estonian Championship, with Selver Tallinn
- 2013/2014 Estonian Championship, with Selver Tallinn
- 2015/2016 Estonian Championship, with Selver Tallinn

National cup winner

- 2003/2004 Estonian Cup 2003, with Pere Leib Tartu
- 2005/2006 Estonian Cup 2005, with Pere Leib Tartu
- 2006/2007 Estonian Cup 2006, with Selver Tallinn
- 2007/2008 Estonian Cup 2007, with Selver Tallinn
- 2008/2009 Estonian Cup 2008, with Selver Tallinn
- 2009/2010 Estonian Cup 2009, with Selver Tallinn
- 2010/2011 Estonian Cup 2010, with Selver Tallinn
- 2011/2012 Estonian Cup 2011, with Selver Tallinn

Beach Volleyball

- 2005 5th U20 European Championship, with Elia Lulla
- 2007 Estonian Championship, with Elia Lulla
- 2014 Estonian Championship, with Mart Tiisaar
- 2014 7th World Student Championship, with Mart Tiisaar

=== Individual ===
- 2005 Young Estonian Volleyball Player of the Year
