= Skuin =

Skuin is a surname. Notable people with the surname include:

- Andres Skuin (1962–2003), Estonian volleyballer
- Elena Skuin (1908–1986), Russian artist
