= 2016 Men's European Volleyball League =

2016 Men's European League
Tournament details
- Host country: Bulgaria
- Dates: 3–20 June (qualification); 1–2 July (final round)
- Teams: 8
- Venue: 1 (in 1 host city)

Final positions
- Champions: Estonia (1st title)
- Runners-up: Macedonia
- Third place: Austria
- Fourth place: Bulgaria

Tournament awards
- MVP: (Estonia) Robert Täht
- Best Setter: (Estonia) Kert Toobal
- Best OH: (Estonia) Robert Täht (Austria) Alexander Berger
- Best MB: (Bulgaria) Svetoslav Gotsev (Austria) Peter Wohlfahrtstätter
- Best OPP: (North Macedonia) Nikola Gjorgiev
- Best Libero: (Estonia) Rait Rikberg

The 2016 Men's European Volleyball League was the 13th edition of the annual Men's European Volleyball League, which features men's national volleyball teams from eight European countries.

A preliminary league round was played from 3 to 20 June 2016, and the final four tournament, which was held at Varna, Bulgaria.

Estonia defeated Macedonia 3–0 in the final.

== Teams ==
- Albania
- Austria
- Belarus
- Bulgaria
- Denmark
- Estonia
- Luxembourg
- Macedonia

== League round ==
- All times are local.

=== Pool A ===
Pos	Team	Pld	W	L	Pts	SW	SL	SR	SPW	SPL	SPR	Qualification
1	Macedonia	6	6	0	16	18	6	3.000	562	525	1.070	Final Four
2	Bulgaria (Note: Qualified as hosts) (H)	6	4	2	11	14	9	1.556	552	489	1.129	Final Four
3	Denmark	6	2	4	8	11	12	0.917	518	513	1.010	
4	Albania	6	0	6	1	2	18	0.111	378	483	0.783	

(H) Host

==== Week 1 ====
- Venue: Palace of Culture and Sports, Varna, Bulgaria

Date	Time		Score		Set 1	Set 2	Set 3	Set 4	Set 5	Total	Report
10 Jun	15:00	Albania	0–3	Macedonia	17–25	23–25	18–25			58–75	Report
10 Jun	18:00	Bulgaria	3–2	Denmark	24–26	22–25	25–21	27–25	16–14	114–111	Report
11 Jun	15:00	Macedonia	3–2	Denmark	25–27	25–21	18–25	25–20	20–18	113–111	Report
11 Jun	18:00	Albania	0–3	Bulgaria	17–25	17–25	15–25			49–75	Report
12 Jun	15:00	Denmark	3–0	Albania	25–18	25–22	25–19			75–59	Report
12 Jun	18:00	Macedonia	3–1	Bulgaria	31–29	15–25	25–21	25–21		96–96	Report

==== Week 2 ====
- Venue: (North Macedonia) Boris Trajkovski Sports Center, Skopje, Macedonia

Date	Time		Score		Set 1	Set 2	Set 3	Set 4	Set 5	Total	Report
16 Jun	17:00	Denmark	1–3	Bulgaria	25–22	17–25	24–26	15–25		81–98	Report
16 Jun	19:30	Macedonia	3–2	Albania	23–25	25–23	20–25	25–18	15–10	108–101	Report
17 Jun	17:00	Bulgaria	3–0	Albania	25–19	25–19	25–19			75–57	Report
17 Jun	19:30	Denmark	0–3	Macedonia	19–25	23–25	23–25			65–75	Report
18 Jun	17:00	Albania	0–3	Denmark	17–25	19–25	18–25			54–75	Report
18 Jun	19:30	Bulgaria	1–3	Macedonia	25–18	21–25	23–25	25–27		94–95	Report

=== Pool B ===
Pos	Team	Pld	W	L	Pts	SW	SL	SR	SPW	SPL	SPR	Qualification
1	Estonia	6	6	0	17	18	5	3.600	571	474	1.205	Final Four
2	Austria	6	4	2	12	14	8	1.750	533	515	1.035	Final Four
3	Belarus	6	2	4	7	10	12	0.833	491	503	0.976	
4	Luxembourg	6	0	6	0	1	18	0.056	372	475	0.783	

==== Week 1 ====
- Venue: Sporthalle, Enns, Austria

Date	Time		Score		Set 1	Set 2	Set 3	Set 4	Set 5	Total	Report
3 Jun	17:45	Austria	3–1	Luxembourg	18–25	25–19	25–22	25–15		93–81	Report
3 Jun	20:15	Belarus	1–3	Estonia	21–25	25–22	20–25	22–25		88–97	Report
4 Jun	17:45	Luxembourg	0–3	Estonia	16–25	14–25	21–25			51–75	Report
4 Jun	20:25	Austria	3–1	Belarus	25–23	25–17	22–25	25–23		97–88	Report
5 Jun	15:30	Luxembourg	0–3	Belarus	19–25	18–25	20–25			57–75	Report
5 Jun	18:00	Estonia	3–1	Austria	25–14	25–27	25–22	27–25		102–88	Report

==== Week 2 ====
- Venue: Rakvere Spordihall, Rakvere, Estonia

Date	Time		Score		Set 1	Set 2	Set 3	Set 4	Set 5	Total	Report
18 Jun	16:00	Austria	3–0	Belarus	34–32	25–21	25–19			84–72	Report
18 Jun	19:00	Estonia	3–0	Luxembourg	25–20	29–27	25–14			79–61	Report
19 Jun	16:00	Belarus	3–0	Luxembourg	25–17	25–19	25–21			75–57	Report
19 Jun	19:00	Austria	1–3	Estonia	14–25	22–25	25–23	32–34		93–107	Report
20 Jun	16:00	Luxembourg	0–3	Austria	21–25	26–28	18–25			65–78	Report
20 Jun	19:00	Belarus	2–3	Estonia	21–25	15–25	25–23	25–23	7–15	93–111	Report

== Final four ==
The top placed team from each group and the best second-placed team qualified for the final four. The fourth participant was the organizer of the tournament.

Qualified teams

- Bulgaria (Host)
- Austria
- Estonia
- Macedonia

=== Bracket ===
- All times are local

Semi-finals
1 July – 15:00
Macedonia	3
Austria	2
1 July – 18:00
Estonia	3
Bulgaria	2

Final
2 July – 18:00
Macedonia	0
Estonia	3
Third place
2 July – 15:00
Austria	3
Bulgaria	0

=== Semifinals ===
Date	Time		Score		Set 1	Set 2	Set 3	Set 4	Set 5	Total	Report
1 Jul	15:00	Macedonia	3–2	Austria	25–23	23–25	17–25	25–18	15–13	105–104	Report
1 Jul	18:00	Estonia	3–2	Bulgaria	25–18	15–25	25–19	14–25	17–15	96–102	Report

=== Third place game ===
Date	Time		Score		Set 1	Set 2	Set 3	Set 4	Set 5	Total	Report
2 Jul	15:00	Austria	3–0	Bulgaria	25–23	25–21	25–23			75–67	Report

=== Final ===
Date	Time		Score		Set 1	Set 2	Set 3	Set 4	Set 5	Total	Report
2 Jul	18:00	Macedonia	0–3	Estonia	19–25	13–25	23–25			55–75	Report

== Final standings ==
Rank	Team
1st place, gold medalist(s)	Estonia
2nd place, silver medalist(s)	Macedonia
3rd place, bronze medalist(s)	Austria
4	Bulgaria
5	Denmark
6	Belarus
7	Albania
8	Luxembourg

Qualified for the 2017 World League

2016 European League champions

Estonia
1st title

14-man Roster for Final Round
Keith Pupart, Ardo Kreek, Kert Toobal, Renee Teppan, Karli Allik, Robert Täht, Denis Losnikov, Oliver Venno, Andres Toobal, Rait Rikberg, Timo Tammemaa, Rauno Tamme, Andri Aganits, Kevin Soo
Head coach
Gheorghe Creţu

== Awards ==
- Most valuable player
  (Estonia) Robert Täht
- Best setter
  (Estonia) Kert Toobal
- Best outside spikers
  (Estonia) Robert Täht
  (Austria) Alexander Berger
- Best middle blockers
  (Bulgaria) Svetoslav Gotsev
  (Austria) Peter Wohlfahrtstätter
- Best opposite spiker
  (North Macedonia) Nikola Gjorgiev
- Best libero
  (Estonia) Rait Rikberg

== See also ==
- 2016 Women's European Volleyball League
