= Saaremaa VK =

Volleyball club in Estonia

- Full name: Saaremaa Võrkpalliklubi
- Founded: 2017
- Ground: Kuressaare Sports Hall (Capacity: 1,500)
- League: Baltic Men Volleyball League; Estonian Volleyball League
- 2020–21: 2nd (Baltic League); 2nd (Estonian League)
- Website: Club home page

Championships
- 1 Baltic Championship; 1 Estonian Championship; 2 Estonian Cups

Saaremaa VK is an Estonian volleyball club based in Kuressaare, Estonia, that competes in the Baltic Volleyball League and Estonian Volleyball League.

The team won Baltic League and Estonian Championship in their first season.

== Team ==
=== 2020/2021 ===
| Head coach: | (Greece) Ioannis Kalmazidis |
| Assistant: | (Estonia) Märt Pajusalu |
| Assistant: | (Latvia) Artūrs Tinte |

| No. | Name | Date of birth | Position |
|---|---|---|---|
| 4 | (United States) Michael Keegan | April 25, 1997 (age 27) | setter |
| 5 | (Estonia) Rauno Tamme | April 7, 1992 (age 32) | outside hitter |
| 6 | (Estonia) Markus Uuskari | April 22, 1997 (age 27) | opposite |
| 7 | (Estonia) Hindrek Pulk | November 7, 1990 (age 34) | opposite |
| 9 | (Estonia) Kaspar Lest | October 4, 2003 (age 21) | middle blocker |
| 10 | (Estonia) Johan Vahter | November 19, 1995 (age 29) | libero |
| 11 | (Estonia) Alari Saar | March 28, 1996 (age 29) | libero |
| 13 | (Estonia) Ragnar Kalde | October 10, 1996 (age 28) | middle blocker |
| 14 | (Finland) Sauli Sinkkonen | September 14, 1989 (age 35) | middle blocker |
| 15 | (Estonia) Helar Jalg | February 15, 1994 (age 31) | outside hitter |
| 17 | (Brazil) Wennder Lopes | December 7, 1991 (age 33) | middle blocker |
| 19 | (Estonia) Keith Pupart (C) | March 19, 1985 (age 40) | outside hitter |
| 22 | (North Macedonia) Filip Despotovski | July 2, 1986 (age 38) | setter |

Team roster – season 2019/2020
| No. | Name | Date of birth | Position |
|---|---|---|---|
| 1 | (Estonia) Henri Treial | May 28, 1992 | middle blocker |
| 2 | (Cuba) Javier Jiménez | November 16, 1989 | outside hitter |
| 3 | (Switzerland) Reto Giger | August 5, 1991 | setter |
| 4 | (Estonia) Robin Alba | May 10, 2001 | outside hitter |
| 5 | (Estonia) Rauno Tamme | April 7, 1992 | outside hitter |
| 6 | (Estonia) Markus Uuskari | April 22, 1997 | opposite |
| 7 | (Estonia) Mart Toom | March 22, 1999 | outside hitter |
| 8 | (Latvia) Artis Caics | October 13, 1985 | setter |
| 9 | (Estonia) Harri Palmar | October 26, 1989 | middle blocker |
| 10 | (Estonia) Johan Vahter | November 19, 1995 | libero |
| 11 | (Estonia) Alari Saar | March 28, 1996 | libero |
| 12 | (Brazil) Daniel Maciel (C) | April 19, 1988 | opposite |
| 15 | (Estonia) Helar Jalg | February 15, 1994 | outside hitter |
| 19 | (Estonia) Keith Pupart | March 19, 1985 | outside hitter |
| 20 | (Australia) Beau Graham | April 17, 1994 | middle blocker |
| 22 | (Estonia) Taavi Prei | September 20, 1990 | middle blocker |
Head coach: (Greece) Ioannis Kalmazidis; Assistant: (Estonia) Märt Pajusalu; Assistant: (Italy) Mirko Fasini

== Season by season ==
| Season | Estonian League | Estonian Cup | Baltic League | European competitions |
|---|---|---|---|---|
| 2017–18 | Champion | Champion | Champion | – |
| 2018–19 | 3rd place | Champion | Runner-up | CEV Challenge Cup 1/16 Finals |
| 2019–20 | cancelled | Runner-up | cancelled | CEV Challenge Cup 1/4 Finals |
| 2020–21 | Runner-up | 1/2 Finals | Runner-up | CEV Challenge Cup 1/8 Finals |

== Honours ==
Baltic League

- Winners (1): 2018
- Runners-up: 2019, 2021

Estonian League

- Winners (1): 2018
- Runners-up: 2021

Estonian Cup

- Winners (2): 2018, 2019
- Runners-up: 2020

== Head coaches ==
- 2017–2019 (Estonia) Urmas Tali
- 2020–2021 (Greece) Ioannis Kalmazidis
