= Pajusalu =

Surname list

Pajusalu is an Estonian surname. Notable people with the surname include:

- Kaisa Pajusalu (born 1989), Estonian rower
- Raimo Pajusalu (born 1981), Estonian volleyball player
- Karl Pajusalu (born 1963), Estonian linguist
- Renate Pajusalu (born 1963), Estonian linguist
