= Martti Keel =

Estonian volleyball player (born 1992)

Personal information
- Nationality: Estonian
- Born: January 30, 1992 (age 34); Rovaniemi, Finland
- Height: 188 cm (6 ft 2 in)
- Weight: 86 kg (190 lb)
- Spike: 322 cm (127 in)
- Block: 318 cm (125 in)

Volleyball information
- Position: Setter

National team
Estonia

Martti Keel (born 30 January 1992) is an Estonian volleyball player. He was a member of the Estonian national team from 2011 to 2014 and represented his country at the 2011 European Volleyball Championships.

Keel started his professional career in club Pärnu VK.

His father is a volleyball player and coach Avo Keel. His brother is a volleyball player Markkus Keel.
