= Alexander Berger =

Austrian volleyball player

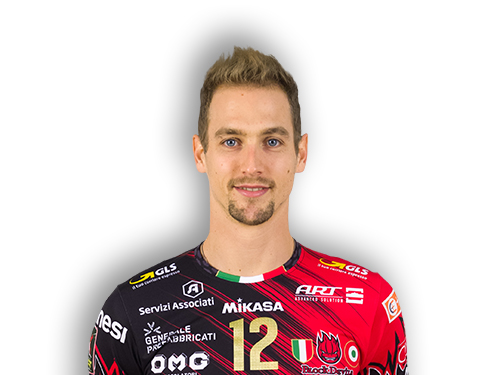
- Berger in 2019

Personal information
- Born: 27 September 1988 (age 38); Vöcklabruck, Austria
- Height: 1.93 m (6 ft 4 in)
- Weight: 85 kg (187 lb)
- Spike: 365 cm (144 in)
- Block: 345 cm (136 in)

Volleyball information
- Position: Outside hitter
- Current club: PAOK VC

Career
| Years | Teams |
|---|---|
| 2009–2014; 2014–2015; 2015–2016; 2016–2019; 2019–2020; 2020–2021; 2021–2022; 2022–2024; 2024–2025; 2025-2026; 2026 | Hypo Tirol Innsbruck; Nantes Rezé Métropole; Tonazzo Padova; Sir Safety Perugia; Gas Sales Piacenza; Halkbank Ankara; Czarni Radom; Cuprum Lubin; GKS Katowice; Pallavolo Belluno; PAOK VC |

National team
| 2009– | Austria |
Honours
Men's volleyball
Representing Austria
European League
| Bronze medal – third place | 2016 Bulgaria |

Alexander Berger (born 27 September 1988) is an Austrian professional volleyball player who plays as an outside hitter for PAOK VC and the Austria national team.

== Honours ==
=== Club ===
- CEV Champions League
  - 2016–17 – with Sir Sicoma Colussi Perugia
- Domestic
  - 2009–10 Austrian Championship, with Hypo Tirol Innsbruck
  - 2010–11 Austrian Championship, with Hypo Tirol Innsbruck
  - 2011–12 Austrian Championship, with Hypo Tirol Innsbruck
  - 2013–14 Austrian Cup, with Hypo Tirol Innsbruck
  - 2013–14 Austrian Championship, with Hypo Tirol Innsbruck
  - 2017–18 Italian SuperCup, with Sir Safety Conad Perugia
  - 2017–18 Italian Cup, with Sir Safety Conad Perugia
  - 2017–18 Italian Championship, with Sir Safety Conad Perugia
  - 2018–19 Italian Cup, with Sir Safety Conad Perugia

=== Individual awards ===
- 2016: European League – Best outside spiker
