= VK Selver Tallinn =

Estonian volleyball club

- Full name: MTÜ Audentese VK Selver Tallinn
- Founded: 2000
- Ground: Audentes Sports Centre, Tallinn
- Manager: (Estonia) Andres Toobal
- League: Estonian Volleyball League; Baltic Men Volleyball League
- 2020–21: 3rd (Estonian Championship); 1st (Baltic League)
- Website: Club home page

Championships
- 7 Baltic Championships; 9 Estonian Championships; 7 Estonian Cups

VK Selver Tallinn is a professional Volleyball team based in Tallinn, Estonia. It plays in the Baltic Men Volleyball League and in the CEV Challenge Cup.

== History ==
Audentes Volleyball Club was founded in 2000. In 2005–06 season an Estonian supermarket chain Selver became the name sponsor for the team. Under the coaching of the Estonian national team head coach Avo Keel Selver won both the Estonian League and the Baltic Men Volleyball League five years in a row.

- 2000–04 Audentes/Hermann
- 2004–05 Audentes Tallinn
- 2005–06 Selver/Audentes University
- 2006–07 Selver/Tallinn
- 2007– VK Selver Tallinn

== Team roster ==
=== 2021/2022 ===
Head coach:	(Estonia) Andres Toobal
Assistant:	(Estonia) Valdis Radionenkov

No.	Name	Date of birth	Position
1	(Canada) Pierce Johnson	July 11, 1998 (age 26)	outside hitter
2	(Estonia) Sander Pärna	July 28, 2004 (age 20)	setter
4	(Estonia) Renet Vanker	September 22, 1998 (age 26)	setter
4	(Estonia) Karel Ellermaa	July 17, 1993 (age 31)	setter
5	(Estonia) Oliver Orav	August 31, 1995 (age 29)	outside hitter
6	(Estonia) Mart Toom	March 22, 1999 (age 25)	outside hitter
7	(Estonia) Denis Losnikov (C)	February 25, 1994 (age 31)	outside hitter
8	(Estonia) Timo Lõhmus	May 30, 2001 (age 23)	opposite
9	(Estonia) Marx Aru	November 8, 2002 (age 22)	middle blocker
10	(Estonia) Sten Vahtras	April 26, 1999 (age 25)	libero
11	(Estonia) Mihkel Varblane	December 12, 1999 (age 25)	middle blocker
12	(Estonia) Helger Hääl	June 9, 1994 (age 30)	middle blocker
13	(Estonia) Mathias Külvi	January 16, 2002 (age 23)	libero
15	(Estonia) Mihkel Nuut	August 29, 1996 (age 28)	opposite

Team roster – season 2020/2021
No.	Name	Date of birth	Position
1	(Finland) Niko Haapakoski	May 1, 1996	setter
4	(Estonia) Renet Vanker	September 22, 1998	setter
5	(Estonia) Oliver Orav	August 31, 1995	outside hitter
7	(Estonia) Renee Teppan	September 26, 1993	opposite
8	(Estonia) Mihkel Varblane	December 12, 1999	middle blocker
9	(Estonia) Rauno Haidla	September 9, 2002	libero
10	(Estonia) Sten Vahtras	April 26, 1999	libero
11	(Estonia) Andrus Raadik (C)	October 19, 1986	outside hitter
12	(Estonia) Kristo Kollo	January 17, 1990	outside hitter
14	(Estonia) Mihkel Nuut	August 29, 1996	opposite
16	(Estonia) Denis Losnikov	February 25, 1994	outside hitter
17	(Estonia) Mathias Külvi	January 16, 2002	libero
19	(Estonia) Marx Aru	November 8, 2002	middle blocker
21	(Estonia) Helger Hääl	June 9, 1994	middle blocker
Head coach: (Estonia) Rainer Vassiljev; Assistant: (Estonia) Andres Toobal

Team roster – season 2019/2020
No.	Name	Date of birth	Position
1	(Poland) Damian Czetowicz	February 26, 2000	setter
3	(Estonia) German Tepner	January 9, 2001	outside hitter
4	(Estonia) Renet Vanker	September 22, 1998	setter
5	(Estonia) Oliver Orav	August 31, 1995	outside hitter
6	(Estonia) Karli Allik (C)	September 25, 1996	outside hitter
7	(Estonia) Denis Losnikov	February 25, 1994	outside hitter
8	(Estonia) Timo Lõhmus	May 30, 2001	outside hitter
9	(Estonia) Rauno Haidla	September 9, 2002	libero
10	(Estonia) Sten Vahtras	April 26, 1999	libero
11	(Estonia) Mihkel Varblane	December 12, 1999	middle blocker
13	(Czech Republic) Matěj Šmídl	February 25, 1997	opposite
14	(Estonia) Devin Põlluste	March 6, 2000	outside hitter
16	(Estonia) Reimo Rannar	January 20, 1988	middle blocker
21	(Estonia) Helger Hääl	June 9, 1994	middle blocker
Head coach: (Italy) Alessandro Piroli; Assistant: (Estonia) Andres Toobal; Assistant: (Estonia) Indrek Verro

== Season by season ==
Season	Estonian League	Estonian Cup	Baltic League	European competitions
2000–01	3rd place	?	–	–
2001–02	5th place	?	–	–
2002–03	4th place	?	–	–
2003–04	4th place	?	–	–
2004–05	Champion	Champion	–	3 CEV Cup Round I
2005–06	Runner-up	Semifinalist	6th place	–
2006–07	Champion	Champion	Champion	3 CEV Cup Round I
2007–08	Champion	Champion	Champion	3 CEV Challenge Cup 1/4 Finals
2008–09	Champion	Runner-up	Champion	3 CEV Challenge Cup Round II
2009–10	Champion	Champion	Champion	2 CEV Cup 1/8 Finals
2010–11	Champion	Champion	Champion	3 CEV Challenge Cup 1/4 Finals
2011–12	Runner-up	Champion	Runner-up	3 CEV Challenge Cup 1/8 Finals
2012–13	Champion	Runner-up	4th place	3 CEV Challenge Cup 1/16 Finals
2013–14	Runner-up	Quarterfinalist	Champion	3 CEV Challenge Cup 1/8 Finals
2014–15	4th place	Quarterfinalist	Runner-up	3 CEV Challenge Cup 1/16 Finals
2015–16	Champion	Quarterfinalist	5th place	–
2016–17	Champion	Runner-up	4th place	2 CEV Cup 1/32 Finals
2017–18	4th place	Quarterfinalist	6th place	–
2018–19	5th place	Semifinalist	5th place	–
2019–20	cancelled	Semifinalist	cancelled	–
2020–21	3rd place	Champion	Champion	–
2021–22		Runner-up	5th place	–

== Honours ==
Baltic League

- Winners (7): 2007, 2008, 2009, 2010, 2011, 2014, 2021
- Runners-up: 2012, 2015

Estonian League

- Winners (9): 2005, 2007, 2008, 2009, 2010, 2011, 2013, 2016, 2017
- Runners-up: 2006, 2012, 2014

Estonian Cup

- Winners (7): 2004, 2006, 2007, 2009, 2010, 2011, 2020
- Runners-up: 2008, 2012, 2016, 2021

== Head coaches ==
- 2000–2001 (Estonia) Andres Skuin
- 2004–2005 (Finland) Juha Lantto
- 2005–2014 (Estonia) Avo Keel
- 2014–2017 (Estonia) Rainer Vassiljev
- 2017–2018 (Latvia) Austris Štāls
- 2018–2019 (Finland) Aapo Rantanen
- 2019–2020 (Italy) Alessandro Piroli
- 2020–2021 (Estonia) Rainer Vassiljev
- 2021– (Estonia) Andres Toobal

== Notable players ==
- (Estonia) Andri Aganits (2 seasons: 2011–2013)
- (Estonia) Martti Juhkami (1 season: 2012–2013)
- (Estonia) Ardo Kreek (3 seasons: 2006–2009)
- (Estonia) Meelis Kivisild (7 seasons: 2008–2015)
- (Estonia) Kristo Kollo (1 season: 2020–2021)
- (Italy) Federico Marretta (1 season: 2014–2015)
- (Estonia) Argo Meresaar (5 seasons: 2008–2013)
- (Estonia) Oliver Orav
- (Estonia) Raimo Pajusalu (1 season: 2004–2005)
- (Ukraine) Dmytro Pashytskyy (1 season: 2010–2011)
- (Latvia) Deniss Petrovs (2 seasons: 2009–2011)
- (Estonia) Hindrek Pulk (4 seasons: 2010–2014)
- (Estonia) Keith Pupart (5 seasons: 2004–2009)
- (Estonia) Andrus Raadik (1 season: 2020–2021)
- (Estonia) Martti Rosenblatt (9 seasons: 2006–2012; 2013–2016)
- (Estonia) Janis Sirelpuu (3 seasons: 2004–2005; 2007–2009)
- (Estonia) Rauno Tamme (1 season: 2016–2017)
- (Estonia) Timo Tammemaa (5 seasons: 2009–2014)
- (Estonia) Renee Teppan (1 season: 2020–2021)
- (Estonia) Andres Toobal (3 seasons: 2014–2016; 2018–2019)
- (Estonia) Rivo Vesik (2 seasons: 2004–2006)
- (Australia) Lincoln Williams (3 seasons: 2014–2017)
