= Robert Täht =

Estonian volleyball player (born 1993)

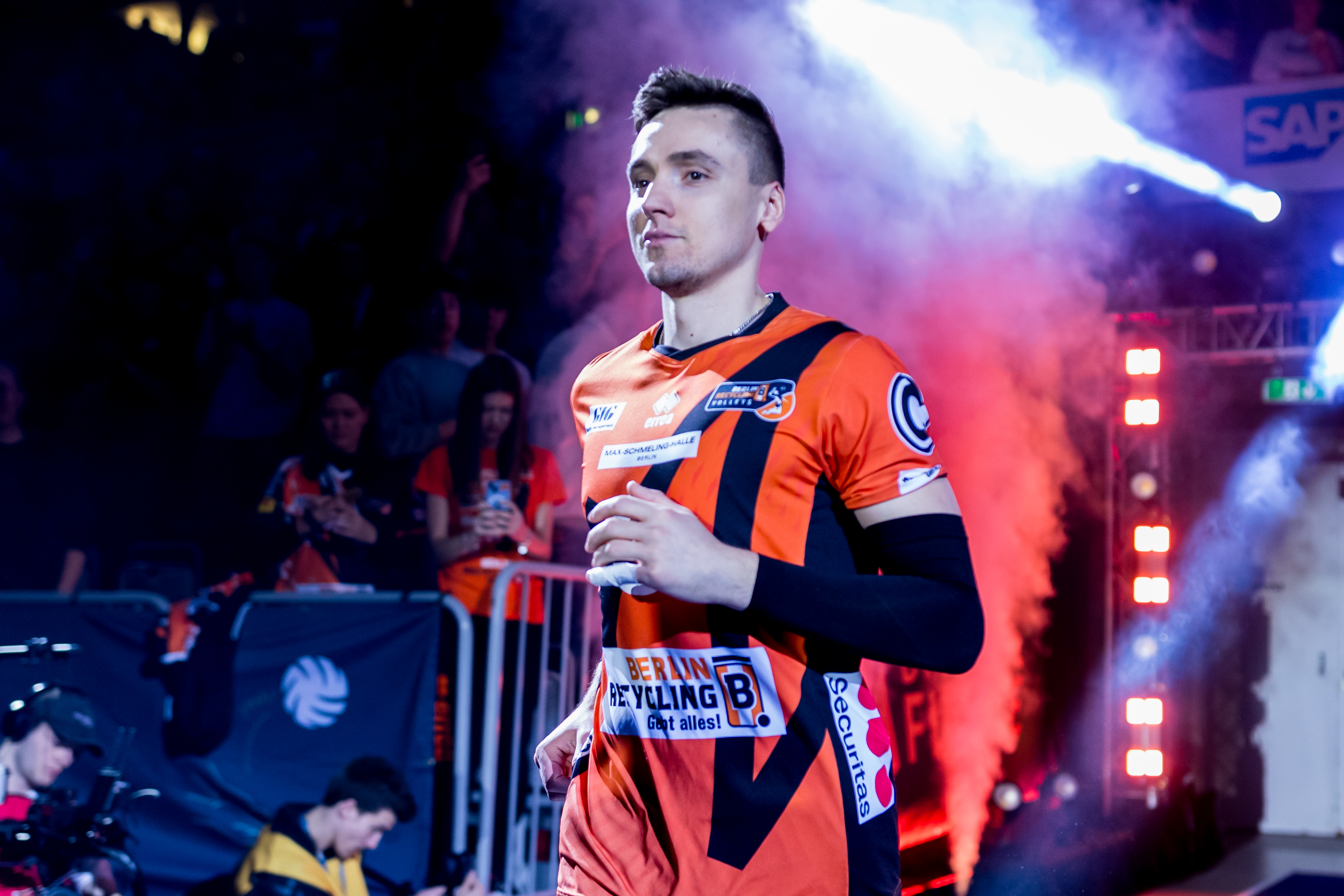

Personal information
- Born: 15 August 1993 (age 33); Võru, Estonia
- Height: 1.91 m (6 ft 3 in)
- Weight: 84 kg (185 lb)
- Spike: 351 cm (138 in)
- Block: 334 cm (131 in)

Volleyball information
- Position: Outside hitter

Career
Years	Teams
2010–2012; 2012–2015; 2015–2018; 2018–2019; 2019–2020; 2020–2021; 2021–2022; 2022–2023; 2023–2024; 2024–2025	Valio Võru; Bigbank Tartu; Cuprum Lubin; Arkas İzmir; Sir Safety Perugia; Asseco Resovia; Skra Bełchatów; Vôlei São José dos Campos; Berlin Recycling Volleys; Stilon Gorzów

National team
2013–	Estonia
Honours
Men's volleyball
Representing Estonia
FIVB Challenger Cup
Bronze medal – third place	2018 Portugal
European League
Gold medal – first place	2016 Bulgaria
Gold medal – first place	2018 Czech Republic

Robert Täht (born 15 August 1993) is an Estonian professional volleyball player who plays as an outside hitter for Cuprum Stilon Gorzów and the Estonia national team.

== Club career ==
Robert Täht began his professional career in 2010 at the age of 17, signing a contract with his hometown club, Valio Võru. In 2012, he moved to the top Estonian team, Bigbank Tartu.

After three seasons in Tartu, Täht signed his first foreign contract and joined the Polish PlusLiga team, Cuprum Lubin. Täht spent the 2018–19 season playing for Arkas İzmir in the Turkish Volleyball League and the 2019–20 season for the Italian Volleyball League powerhouse, Sir Safety Perugia. For the next two seasons he returned to PlusLiga to play for Asseco Resovia and Skra Bełchatów.

In June 2022, Täht signed with Vôlei São José dos Campos, one of the Brazilian Super League teams, becoming the first ever Estonian to have played in the Brazilian top flight. The season was cut short due to a knee injury and Täht returned to Europe for treatment in February 2023.

In October 2023, he signed with Berlin Recycling Volleys for the oncoming Volleyball Bundesliga season.

== National team ==
As a member of the senior national team, Täht competed in 2015, 2017, 2019, 2021 and 2023 CEV European Championships.

With his national team, Täht won the 2016 European League title and was named MVP of the tournament. He helped Estonia win their second European League title in 2018.

== Honours ==
=== Club ===
- Baltic League
  - 2013–14 – with Bigbank Tartu
  - 2014–15 – with Bigbank Tartu
- Domestic
  - 2013–14 Estonian Championship, with Bigbank Tartu
  - 2014–15 Estonian Championship, with Bigbank Tartu
  - 2018–19 Turkish Championship, with Arkas İzmir
  - 2019–20 Italian SuperCup, with Sir Safety Perugia
  - 2023–24 German SuperCup, with Berlin Recycling Volleys
  - 2023–24 German Cup, with Berlin Recycling Volleys
  - 2023–24 German Championship, with Berlin Recycling Volleys

=== Individual awards ===
- 2011: Young Estonian Volleyball Player of the Year
- 2014: Baltic League – Best server
- 2015: Baltic League – Most valuable player
- 2015: Baltic League – Best server
- 2016: European League – Most valuable player
- 2016: European League – Best outside spiker
- 2016: Estonian Volleyball Player of the Year
- 2017: Estonian Volleyball Player of the Year
- 2018: Estonian Volleyball Player of the Year
- 2019: Estonian Volleyball Player of the Year
