= Silver Maar =

Estonian volleyball player (born 1999)

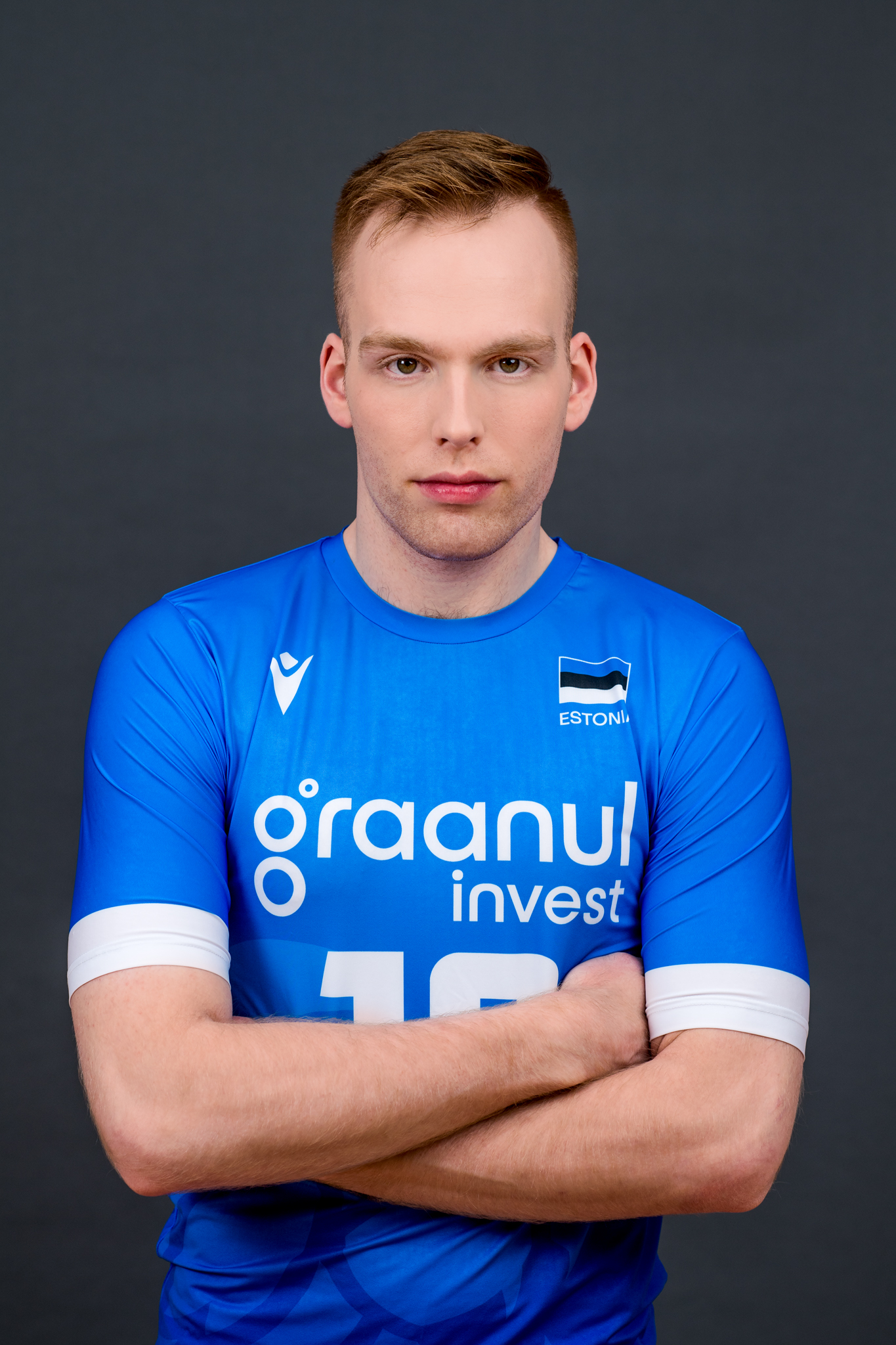
- Maar in 2022

Personal information
- Nationality: Estonian
- Born: February 11, 1999 (age 27)
- Height: 188 cm (6 ft 2 in)
- Weight: 77 kg (170 lb)
- Spike: 315 cm (124 in)
- Block: 300 cm (118 in)

Volleyball information
- Position: Libero

National team
Estonia

Silver Maar (born 11 February 1999) is an Estonian volleyball player. He is a member of the Estonian national team since 2018 and represented his country at the 2019 European Volleyball Championships.

He started his professional career in club Pärnu VK.
