= Nikola Gjorgiev =

Macedonian volleyball player (born 1988)

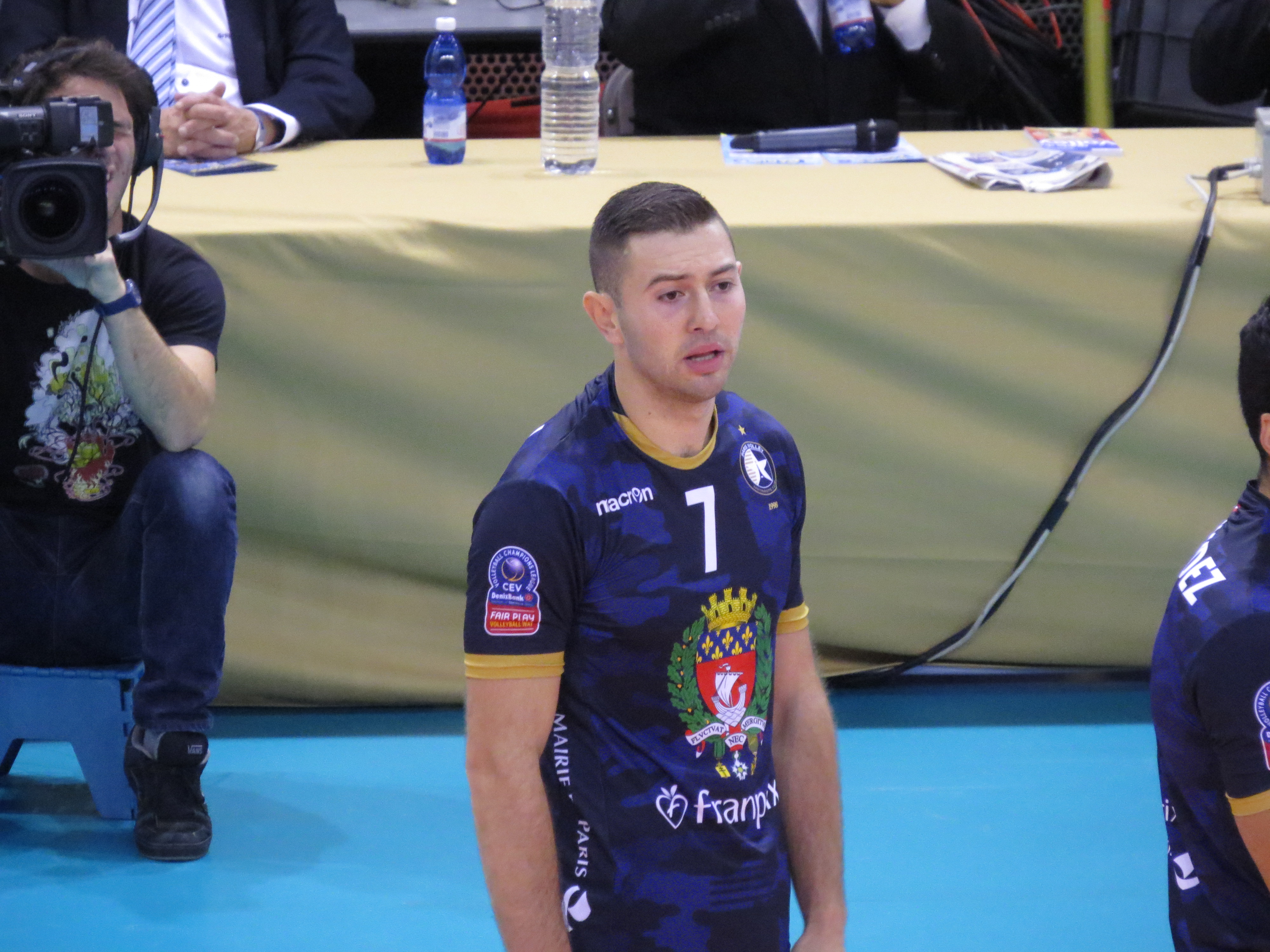

Personal information
- Full name: Nikola Gjorgiev
- Nationality: Macedonian
- Born: 23 July 1988 (age 38); Strumica, Macedonia
- Height: 1.96 m (6 ft 5 in)
- Weight: 85 kg (187 lb)
- Spike: 340 cm (130 in)
- Block: 325 cm (128 in)

Volleyball information
- Position: Outside hitter, opposite
- Current club: Osaka Blazers Sakai
- Number: 14

Career
Years	Teams
2007–2009; 2009–2010; 2010–2014; 2014–2015; 2015–2016; 2017–2018; 2018–	OK Radnički Kragujevac; Volley Forlì; Maliye Milli Piyango SK; Paris Volley; Toray Arrows; ONICO Warszawa; Osaka Blazers Sakai

National team
North Macedonia
Honours
Representing North Macedonia
Men's volleyball
European League
Silver medal – second place	2015 Poland
Silver medal – second place	2016 Bulgaria
- Last updated: 4 May 2017

Nikola Gjorgiev (born 23 July 1988) is a Macedonian volleyball player, a member of North Macedonia men's national volleyball team and Japanese club Osaka Blazers Sakai, 2009 Serbian Champion, 2017 Japanese Champion.

== Career ==
=== National team ===
In 2015 Macedonian national team, including Gjorgiev, met with Slovenia in the finale of 2015 European League and achieved silver medal. Gjorgiev was chosen the Best Outside Spiker of the tournament. One year later, his national team also went to the finale, but was beaten by Estonia. He received an individual award for the Best Opposite Spiker.

== Sporting achievements ==
=== Clubs ===
==== National championships ====
- 2007/2008 Serbian Cup, with OK Radnički Kragujevac
- 2007/2008 Serbian Championship, with OK Radnički Kragujevac
- 2008/2009 Serbian Championship, with OK Radnički Kragujevac
- 2014/2015 French Championship, with Paris Volley
- 2015/2016 Japanese Championship, with Toray Arrows
- 2016/2017 Japanese Championship, with Toray Arrows

=== National team ===
- 2015 European League
- 2016 European League

=== Individually ===
- 2015 European League - Best Outside Spiker
- 2016 European League - Best Opposite Spiker
- 2017 European league - Best Opposite Spiker
