= Andres Toobal =

Estonian volleyball player and coach

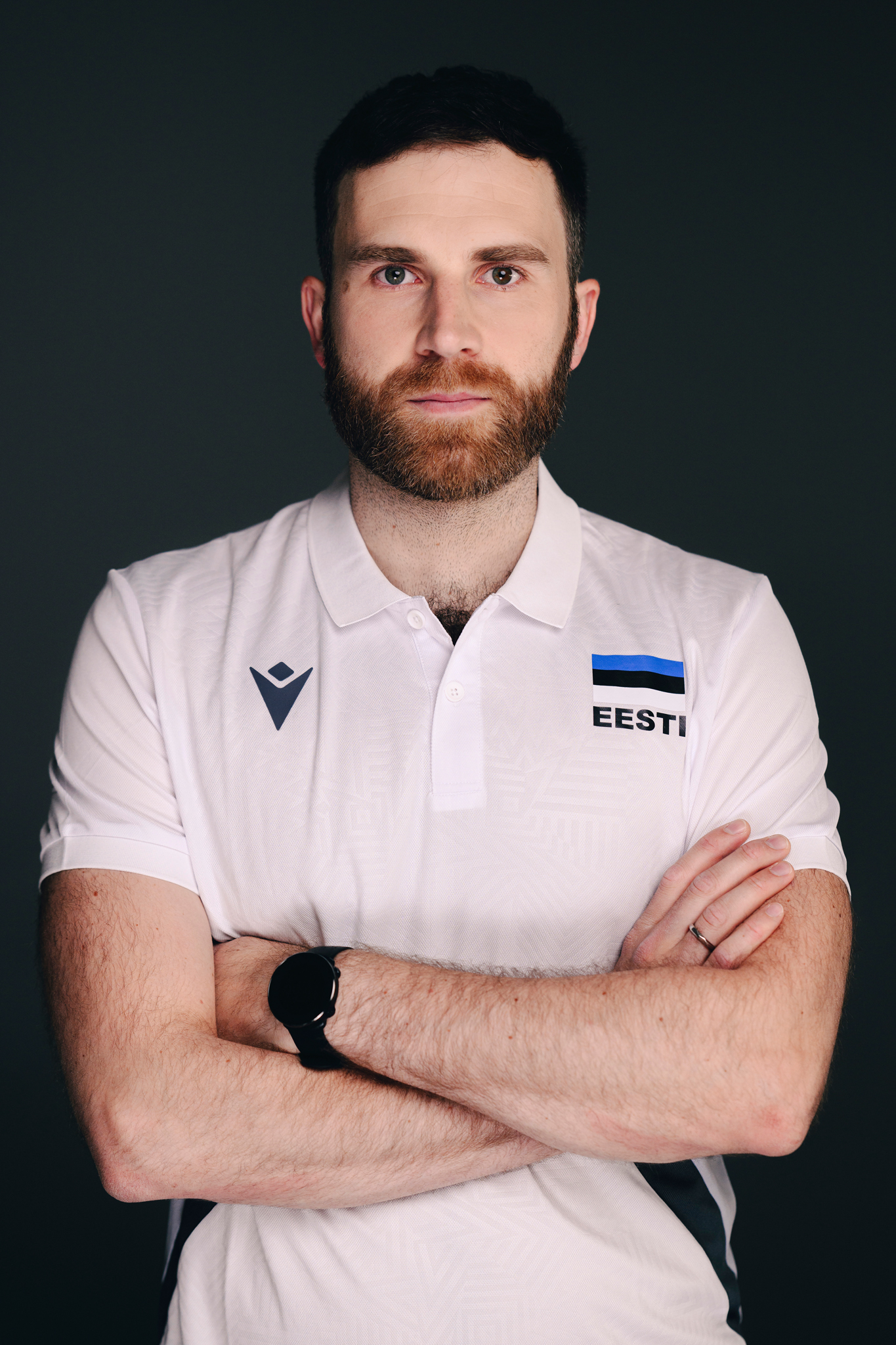

Personal information
- Nationality: Estonian
- Born: 27 August 1988 (age 38); Türi, Estonia
- Height: 1.93 m (6 ft 4 in)
- Weight: 84 kg (185 lb)
- Spike: 335 cm (132 in)
- Block: 320 cm (126 in)

Coaching information
- Current team: Selver Tallinn; Estonia Women
Previous teams coached
Years	Teams
2019–2021; 2020– 2021–	Selver Tallinn (AC); Estonia Women (AC); Selver Tallinn

Volleyball information
- Position: Setter

Career
Years	Teams
2006–2009; 2009–2011; 2011–2012; 2012; 2012–2014; 2014–2016; 2016–2017; 2017–2018; 2018–2019	(Estonia) Pärnu (Estonia) Pere Leib Tartu (Estonia) Pärnu (France) Canteleu-Maromme (Estonia) Bigbank Tartu (Estonia) Selver Tallinn (Belgium) Topvolley Antwerpen (Slovakia) Prievidza (Estonia) Selver Tallinn

National team
2010–2017	Estonia (112 games)
Honours
Men's volleyball
Representing Estonia
European League
Gold medal – first place	2016 Bulgaria
- Last updated: 23 August 2021

Andres Toobal (born 27 August 1988) is an Estonian volleyball coach. He is the head coach of Selver Tallinn of the Estonian Volleyball League and also serves as the assistant coach of the Estonia women's national volleyball team.

== Estonian national team ==
As a member of the senior Estonia men's national volleyball team, Toobal competed at the 2015 and 2017 Men's European Volleyball Championship. With the national team Toobal won the 2016 European Volleyball League title.

== Sporting achievements ==
=== Clubs ===
Baltic League

- 2009/2010 - with Pere Leib Tartu
- 2011/2012 - with Pärnu
- 2013/2014 - with Bigbank Tartu
- 2014/2015 - with Selver Tallinn

National championship

- 2006/2007 Estonian Championship, with Pärnu
- 2007/2008 Estonian Championship, with Pärnu
- 2008/2009 Estonian Championship, with Pärnu
- 2009/2010 Estonian Championship, with Pere Leib Tartu
- 2010/2011 Estonian Championship, with Pere Leib Tartu
- 2011/2012 Estonian Championship, with Pärnu
- 2013/2014 Estonian Championship, with Bigbank Tartu
- 2015/2016 Estonian Championship, with Selver Tallinn
- 2017/2018 Slovak Championship, with Prievidza

National cup

- 2013/2014 Estonian Cup 2013, with Bigbank Tartu
- 2017/2018 Slovak Cup 2018, with Prievidza

=== National team ===
- 2016 European League

=== Individual ===
- 2007 Young Estonian Volleyball Player of the Year
- 2018 Slovak Cup – Most Valuable Player

== Personal life ==
Andres Toobal is the younger brother of Estonia men's national volleyball team captain Kert Toobal.
