= Beau Graham =

Australian volleyball player (born 1994)

Personal information
- Full name: Beau James Graham
- Nationality: Australian
- Born: 17 April 1994 (age 32); South Brisbane, Queensland, Australia
- Height: 202 cm (6 ft 8 in)
- Weight: 86 kg (190 lb)
- Spike: 351 cm (138 in)
- Block: 332 cm (131 in)

Volleyball information
- Position: middle blocker
- Current club: Saaremaa
- Number: 1 (national team), 20 (club)

Career
Years	Teams
2014–2015; 2015–2016; 2016–2017; 2017–2018; 2018–2019; 2019–	Știința Explorări; Habo Wolley; Pamvohaikos; Saint-Quentin Volley; Volejbalový klub Příbram; Saaremaa

National team
2015–	Australia
Honours
Representing Australia
Men's volleyball
Asian Championship
Silver medal – second place	2019 Tehran	Team
- Last updated: 30 December 2019

Beau James Graham (born 17 April 1994) is an Australian male volleyball player. He is part of the Australia men's national volleyball team. On club level he plays for Saaremaa in Estonia.

== Sporting achievements ==
=== Clubs ===
National cup

- 2019/2020 Estonian Cup 2019, with Saaremaa

=== National team ===
- 2019 Asian Championship
