= Oliver Orav =

Estonian volleyball player (born 1995)

Personal information
- Nationality: Estonian
- Born: 31 August 1995 (age 31)
- Height: 1.93 m (6 ft 4 in)
- Weight: 78 kg (172 lb)
- Spike: 352 cm (139 in)
- Block: 325 cm (128 in)

Volleyball information
- Position: Outside spiker
- Current club: VK Selver Tallinn
- Number: 5

National team
Estonia

Oliver Orav (born 31 August 1995) is an Estonian volleyball player for VK Selver Tallinn and the Estonian national team.

He participated at the 2017 Men's European Volleyball Championship.

== Sporting achievements ==
=== Clubs ===
National cup

- 2020/2021 Estonian Cup, with Selver Tallinn
