= Sauli Sinkkonen =

Finnish volleyball player (born 1989)

Personal information
- Nationality: Finnish
- Born: 14 September 1989 (age 37); Äetsä, Finland
- Height: 2.01 m (6 ft 7 in)
- Weight: 87 kg (192 lb)
- Spike: 348 cm (137 in)
- Block: 325 cm (128 in)

Volleyball information
- Position: Middle blocker
- Current club: Topvolley Antwerpen
- Number: 14

Career
Years	Teams
2007–2016; 2016–2017; 2017–2018; 2018–2019; 2019–2020; 2020–	(Finland) Tampereen Isku-Volley (Belgium) Topvolley Antwerpen (France) Chaumont Volley-Ball 52 (Finland) Akaa-Volley (Romania) VM Zalău (Estonia) Saaremaa

National team
2011–	Finland

Sauli Sinkkonen (born 14 September 1989) is a Finnish male volleyball player. He is part of the Finland men's national volleyball team. On club level he plays for Saaremaa.
