= Andrus Raadik =

Estonian volleyball player

Personal information
- Nationality: Estonian
- Born: 19 October 1986 (age 40); Pärnu
- Height: 197 cm (6 ft 6 in)
- Weight: 97 kg (214 lb)

Volleyball information
- Position: Outside hitter

Career
Years	Teams
2006–2016; 2016–2018; 2018–2019; 2019; 2019–2020; 2020–2021; 2021–2023; 2023–2025	(Estonia) Pärnu (Finland) Pielaveden Sampo (Finland) Savo Volley (Turkey) Arhavi Belediyespor (Tunisia) CS Sfaxien (Estonia) Selver Tallinn (Finland) Savo Volley (Estonia) Pärnu

National team
2017–2021	Estonia (65 games)
- Last updated: 21 April 2025

Andrus Raadik (born 19 October 1986) is a former Estonian volleyball player, and a member of the Estonia men's national volleyball team.

== Club career ==
Raadik was born in Pärnu, and started his career in his hometown club Pärnu VK at the age of 20. He spent ten seasons in Pärnu and won the Estonian Championship once, the Baltic League once and the Estonian Cup three times. In 2016 he moved to Finland and signed with Pielaveden Sampo. With Sampo Raadik won two Finnish Championship bronze medals on was named the Finnish league MVP. He spent the 2018–19 season with another Finnish team Savo Volley. For the 2019–20 season Raadik signed with Arhavi Belediyespor of the Turkish Men's Volleyball League. He parted ways with the club in December 2019 and joined Tunisian League top team CS Sfaxien. For the next season he returned to native Estonia and signed with Selver Tallinn.

== National team ==
As a member of the senior Estonia men's national volleyball team, Raadik competed at the 2017 and 2019 European Volleyball Championships.

== Sporting achievements ==
=== Clubs ===
Baltic League

- 2010/2011 – with Pärnu
- 2011/2012 – with Pärnu
- 2012/2013 – with Pärnu
- 2015/2016 – with Pärnu
- 2020/2021 – with Selver Tallinn
- 2024/2025 – with Pärnu

National championship

- 2006/2007 Estonian Championship, with Pärnu
- 2007/2008 Estonian Championship, with Pärnu
- 2008/2009 Estonian Championship, with Pärnu
- 2009/2010 Estonian Championship, with Pärnu
- 2010/2011 Estonian Championship, with Pärnu
- 2011/2012 Estonian Championship, with Pärnu
- 2012/2013 Estonian Championship, with Pärnu
- 2013/2014 Estonian Championship, with Pärnu
- 2014/2015 Estonian Championship, with Pärnu
- 2015/2016 Estonian Championship, with Pärnu
- 2016/2017 Finnish Championship, with Pielaveden Sampo
- 2017/2018 Finnish Championship, with Pielaveden Sampo
- 2020/2021 Estonian Championship, with Selver Tallinn
- 2021/2022 Finnish Championship, with Savo Volley
- 2023/2024 Estonian Championship, with Pärnu
- 2024/2025 Estonian Championship, with Pärnu

National cup

- 2009/2010 Estonian Cup, with Pärnu
- 2010/2011 Estonian Cup, with Pärnu
- 2012/2013 Estonian Cup, with Pärnu
- 2014/2015 Estonian Cup, with Pärnu
- 2015/2016 Estonian Cup, with Pärnu
- 2016/2017 Finnish Cup, with Pielaveden Sampo
- 2020/2021 Estonian Cup, with Selver Tallinn
- 2021/2022 Finnish Cup, with Savo Volley
- 2024/2025 Estonian Cup, with Pärnu

=== Individual ===
- 2016 Baltic League – Best outside hitter
- 2017 Finnish League – Most valuable player
- 2022 Finnish Cup – Most valuable player

== Personal ==
His younger brother Rain is a basketball player and a former member of the Estonian national basketball team.
