= Laimons Raudsepp =

Estonian volleyball player and coach (born 1951)

Laimons Raudsepp (born 25 July 1951) is an Estonian volleyball player and coach.

He was born in Tallinn. He studied at Lesgaft National State University of Physical Education, Sport and Health.

He started playing sports (tennis) in 1960, coached by Jüri Põldoja and changed to volleyball in 1962. 1970–1972 and 1976–1977 he played for the club Kalev, which participated in the Soviet Union championships. He is 7-time Estonian champion with different clubs.

In 1969 he started his coaching career. 1978–1991 he was the coach of Kalev. 2002–2008 he was the head coach of Sylvester Tallinn, and 2016–2018 Järvamaa VK. He has been the head coach of Estonia men's national volleyball team and coach of Finland men's national volleyball team in 1991–1997.

In 1985 he was named as Merited Coach of Estonian SSR.
