= Jadar Radom =

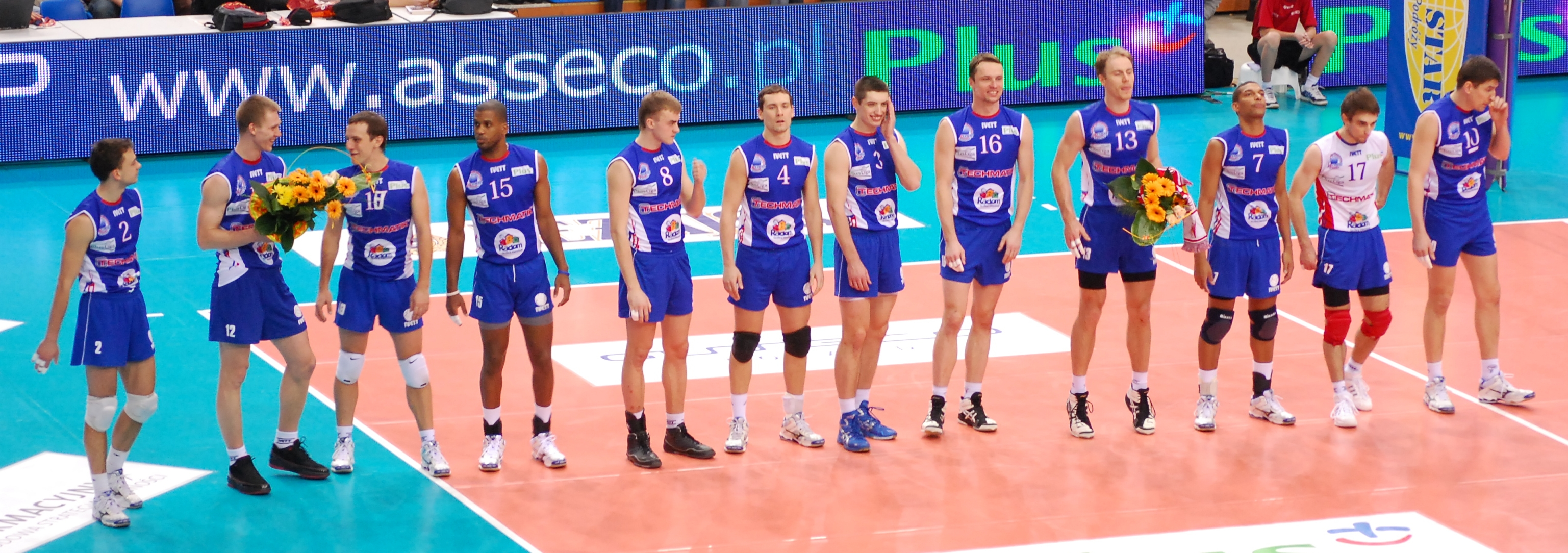
- Full name: Klub Sportowy Jadar S.A. Radom
- Founded: 2003
- Dissolved: 2011; 14 years ago
- Ground: Hala MOSiR; Gabriela Narutowicza 9; 26-600 Radom, Poland

Uniforms
Home	Away

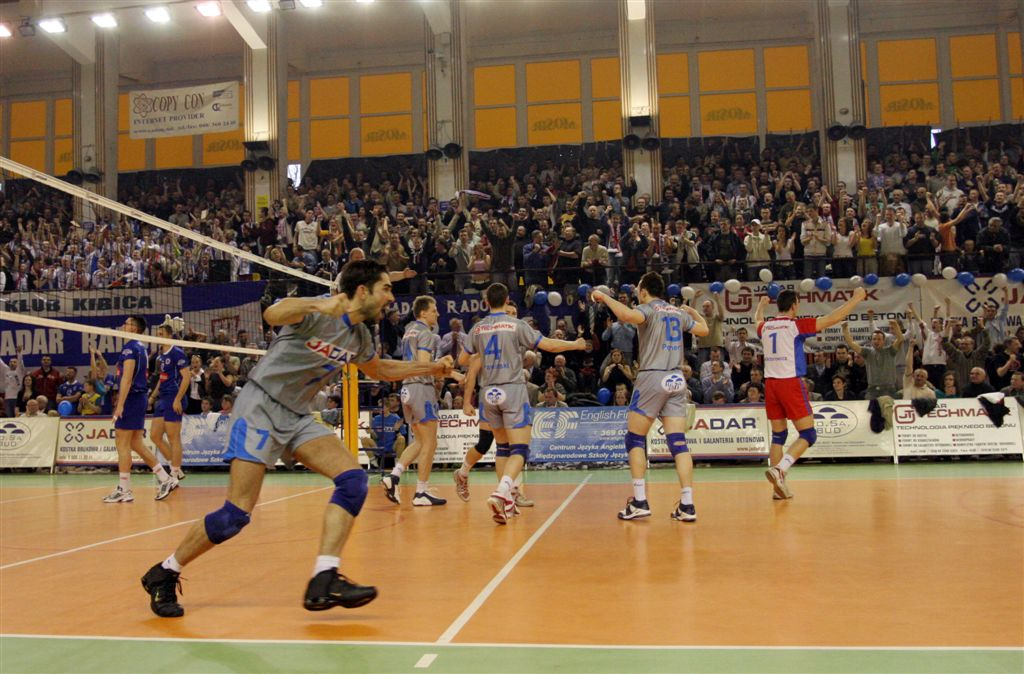
Jadar Radom players in 2005–06 season

Jadar Radom was a Polish volleyball club, from Radom, which existed between 2003 and 2011. From 2006 to 2010 they played in the highest level of Polish Volleyball League.

The club was founded to fill the void after the city's traditional club Czarni Radom folded in 2003. However soon Czarni's fans were conflicted with Jadar because the club did not continue the history and tradition of Czarni Radom that had gone bankrupt. Since 2005 they were not allowed to watch any match of Jadar. This caused conflict among the "new" Jadar fans and the "old" Czarni fans who wanted Jadar to continue the legacy of the dissolved Czarni club. In the end due to the conflict Czarni started attending the reserve Jadar matches and then reformed the original club in 2007 on the basis of them.
