= Keith Pupart =

Estonian volleyball player

Personal information
- Full name: Keith Pupart
- Nationality: Estonian
- Born: March 19, 1985 (age 41); Kuressaare, then part of Estonian SSR, Soviet Union
- Height: 1.95 m (6 ft 5 in)
- Weight: 93 kg (205 lb)
- Spike: 346 cm (136 in)
- Block: 322 cm (127 in)

Volleyball information
- Position: Outside hitter
- Current club: Selver/TalTech
- Number: 19

Career
Years	Teams
2003–2004; 2004–2005; 2005–2009; 2009–2013; 2013–2015; 2015–2018; 2018–2019; 2019–2021; 2021–2022; 2022–2023; 2023–	(Estonia) Sylvester Tallinn (Estonia) Audentes Tallinn (Estonia) Selver Tallinn (France) Rennes Volley 35 (France) Arago de Sète (Poland) Cuprum Lubin (Belgium) Noliko Maaseik (Estonia) Saaremaa (Romania) SCM U Craiova (Romania) SCM Zalău (Estonia) Selver/TalTech

National team
2006–2016	Estonia (170 games)
Honours
Men's volleyball
Representing Estonia
European League
Gold medal – first place	2016 Bulgaria
- Last updated: 20 December 2023

Keith Pupart (born 19 March 1985) is an Estonian volleyball player who plays for Estonian Baltic League club Selver/TalTech.

== Estonian national team ==
As a member of the senior Estonia men's national volleyball team, Pupart competed at the 2009, the 2011 and the 2015 European Volleyball Championships. With the national team Pupart won the 2016 European Volleyball League title.

== Sporting achievements ==
=== Clubs ===
Baltic League

- 2006/2007 – with Selver Tallinn
- 2007/2008 – with Selver Tallinn
- 2008/2009 – with Selver Tallinn
- 2020/2021 – with Saaremaa

National championship

- 2003/2004 Estonian Championship, with Sylvester Tallinn
- 2004/2005 Estonian Championship, with Audentes Tallinn
- 2005/2006 Estonian Championship, with Selver Tallinn
- 2006/2007 Estonian Championship, with Selver Tallinn
- 2007/2008 Estonian Championship, with Selver Tallinn
- 2008/2009 Estonian Championship, with Selver Tallinn
- 2018/2019 Belgian Championship, with Noliko Maaseik
- 2020/2021 Estonian Championship, with Saaremaa
- 2012/2022 Romanian Championship, with SCM U Craiova

National cup

- 2004/2005 Estonian Cup, with Audentes Tallinn
- 2006/2007 Estonian Cup, with Selver Tallinn
- 2007/2008 Estonian Cup, with Selver Tallinn
- 2008/2009 Estonian Cup, with Selver Tallinn
- 2011/2012 French Cup, with Rennes Volley 35
- 2012/2013 French SuperCup, with Rennes Volley 35
- 2018/2019 Belgian SuperCup, with Noliko Maaseik
- 2019/2020 Estonian Cup, with Saaremaa

=== National team ===
- 2016 European League

=== Individual ===
- 2004 Young Estonian Volleyball Player of the Year
- 2012 Estonian Volleyball Player of the Year
