= Ioannis Kalmazidis =

Greek-Swedish volleyball player (born 1968)

Giannis Kalmazidis

Personal information
- Nationality: Swedish; Greek
- Born: 16 June 1968 (age 58); Budapest, Hungary
- Height: 1.90 m (6 ft 3 in)

Coaching information
Previous teams coached
Years	Teams
2007–2008; 2008–2010; 2010–2012; 2012–2016; 2013–2014; 2014–2017; 2017–2018; 2018–2019; 2019; 2020–2021; 2021–2022; 2022–2024; 2024–	Iraklis Thessaloniki (AC); Olympiacos (AC); Olympiacos; Greece (W); Panathinaikos; PAOK; Omonia; Speedball Chekka; Al Ain SC; Saaremaa; PAOK; Panathinaikos (W); OFI

Volleyball information
- Position: Setter

Career
Years	Teams
1986–1989; 1989–1992; 1992–1994; 1994–1999; 1999–2001; 2001–2003; 2003–2007	Sollentuna; Orestiada; Esperos Vyzantiou; PAOK; Iraklis Thessaloniki; Aris Thessaloniki; Iraklis Thessaloniki

National team
1987–1989	Sweden
Honours
Men's volleyball
Representing Sweden
European Championship
Silver medal – second place	1989 Sweden	Team competition

Giannis Kalmazidis (Greek: Γιάννης Καλμαζίδης; born 16 June 1968) is a Greek-Swedish retired volleyball player and current coach of OFI Crete. He played for national level for Sweden and was competed in the men's tournament at the 1988 Summer Olympics. He was also member of the team who won the silver medal in 1989 European Championship.
