= Denis Losnikov =

Estonian volleyball player (born 1994)

Personal information
- Nationality: Estonian
- Born: 25 February 1994 (age 32)
- Height: 1.96 m (6 ft 5 in)
- Weight: 87 kg (192 lb)
- Spike: 335 cm (132 in)
- Block: 324 cm (128 in)

Volleyball information
- Position: Libero
- Current club: VK Selver Tallinn
- Number: 7

National team
Estonia

Denis Losnikov (born 25 February 1994) is an Estonian volleyball player for VK Selver Tallinn and the Estonian national team.

He participated at the 2017 Men's European Volleyball Championship.

== Sporting achievements ==
=== Clubs ===
National cup

- 2020/2021 Estonian Cup, with Selver Tallinn
