= Raimo Pajusalu =

Estonian volleyball player

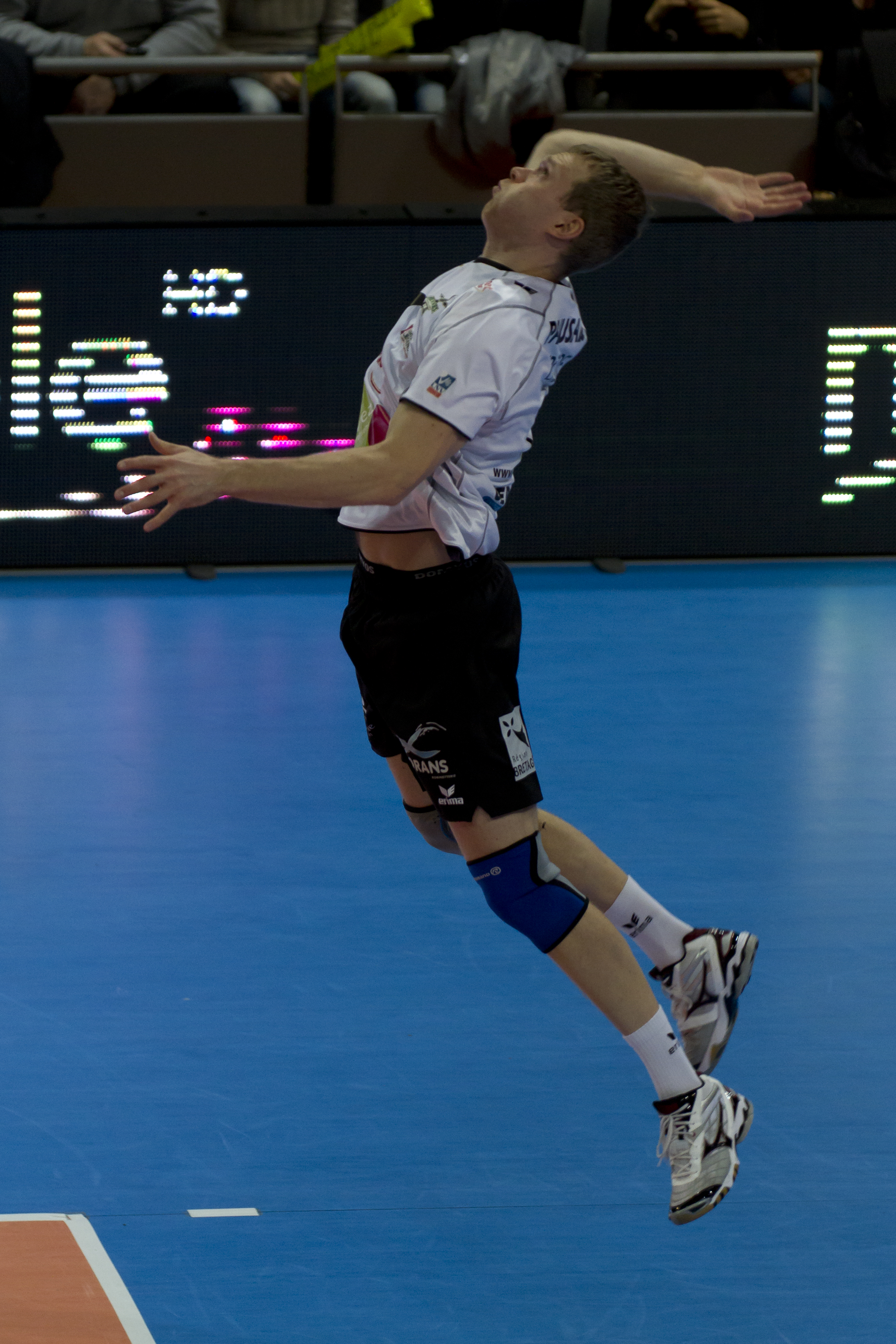
- Pajusalu serving for Rennes in 2012.

Personal information
- Full name: Raimo Pajusalu
- Nationality: Estonian
- Born: 1 February 1981 (age 45); Pärnu, Estonia
- Height: 2.00 m (6 ft 6 1/2 in)
- Weight: 96 kg (212 lb)
- Spike: 358 cm (141 in)
- Block: 335 cm (132 in)

Volleyball information
- Position: middle blocker

Career
Years	Teams
1998–2004; 2004–2005; 2005–2006; 2006–2009; 2009–2014	(Estonia) ESS Falck Pärnu (Estonia) Audentes Tallinn (Austria) Hypo Tirol Innsbruck (Belgium) Knack Randstad Roeselare (France) Rennes Volley 35

National team
2000–2014	Estonia (160 games)
- Last updated: December 23, 2016

Raimo Pajusalu (born 1 February 1981) is a former Estonian volleyball player. He was a member of the Estonian national team from 2000 to 2014 and represented his country at the 2009 and 2011 European Volleyball Championships.

Pajusalu started his professional career in hometown club ESS Falck Pärnu. He has also played in Austria, Belgium and France.

== Sporting achievements ==
=== Clubs ===
MEVZA Cup

- 2005/2006 – with Hypo Tirol Innsbruck

National championship

- 1998/1999 Estonian Championship, with ESS Pärnu
- 1999/2000 Estonian Championship, with ESS Pärnu
- 2000/2001 Estonian Championship, with ESS Pärnu
- 2001/2002 Estonian Championship, with ESS Pärnu
- 2002/2003 Estonian Championship, with ESS Pärnu
- 2003/2004 Estonian Championship, with ESS Falck Pärnu
- 2004/2005 Estonian Championship, with Audentes Tallinn
- 2005/2006 Austrian Championship, with Hypo Tirol Innsbruck
- 2006/2007 Belgian Championship, with Knack Randstad Roeselare
- 2007/2008 Belgian Championship, with Knack Randstad Roeselare
- 2008/2009 Belgian Championship, with Knack Randstad Roeselare

National cup

- 1998/1999 Estonian Cup 1998, with ESS Pärnu
- 1999/2000 Estonian Cup 1999, with ESS Pärnu
- 2000/2001 Estonian Cup 2000, with ESS Pärnu
- 2001/2002 Estonian Cup 2001, with ESS Pärnu
- 2002/2003 Estonian Cup 2002, with ESS Pärnu
- 2003/2004 Estonian Cup 2003, with ESS Falck Pärnu
- 2004/2005 Estonian Cup 2004, with Audentes Tallinn
- 2005/2006 Austrian Cup 2006, with Hypo Tirol Innsbruck
- 2006/2007 Belgian Cup 2007, with Knack Randstad Roeselare
- 2007/2008 Belgian Cup 2008, with Knack Randstad Roeselare
- 2008/2009 Belgian SuperCup 2008, with Knack Randstad Roeselare
- 2011/2012 French Cup 2012, with Rennes Volley 35
- 2012/2013 French SuperCup 2012, with Rennes Volley 35

=== Individual ===
- 2006 Estonian Volleyball Player of the Year
- 2007 Estonian Volleyball Player of the Year
- 2008 Estonian Volleyball Player of the Year

== Personal ==
His younger sister Kaisa is a former Estonian rower, who won a bronze medal at the European Championships in 2012.
