= Niko Haapakoski =

Finnish volleyball player (born 1996)

Personal information
- Nationality: Finnish
- Born: 1 May 1996 (age 30)
- Height: 1.92 m (6 ft 4 in)
- Weight: 74 kg (163 lb)
- Spike: 325 cm (128 in)
- Block: 315 cm (124 in)

Volleyball information
- Position: Setter
- Current club: Selver Tallinn
- Number: 1

Career
Years	Teams
2014–2019; 2019–2020; 2020–	(Finland) Lentopalloseura ETTA (Cyprus) Anorthosis Famagusta (Estonia) Selver Tallinn

National team
Finland

Niko Haapakoski (born 1 May 1996) is a Finnish volleyball player for Lentopalloseura ETTA and the Finnish national team.

He participated at the 2017 Men's European Volleyball Championship.

== Sporting achievements ==
=== Clubs ===
National cup

- 2020/2021 Estonian Cup, with Selver Tallinn
