= Andres Skuin =

Estonian volleyball player and coach (1962–2003)

Andres Skuin (3 December 1962 – 8 January 2003) was an Estonian volleyballer and coach.

== Biography ==
He was born in Võru. In 1985 he graduated from the University of Tartu's Institute of Physical Education.

== Career ==
He began his volleyball career in 1973, coached by Aksel Saal. He played at Tallinna Autobussikoondis team (Estonian champion in 1990).

He started his coaching career in 1985. In 2000 he was the head coach of Estonia women's national volleyball team, and 2001-2003 Estonia men's national volleyball team.

In 2002 he was awarded the state sport prize (Estonian: riiklik spordipreemia).
