= Johan Vahter =

Estonian volleyball player (born 1995)

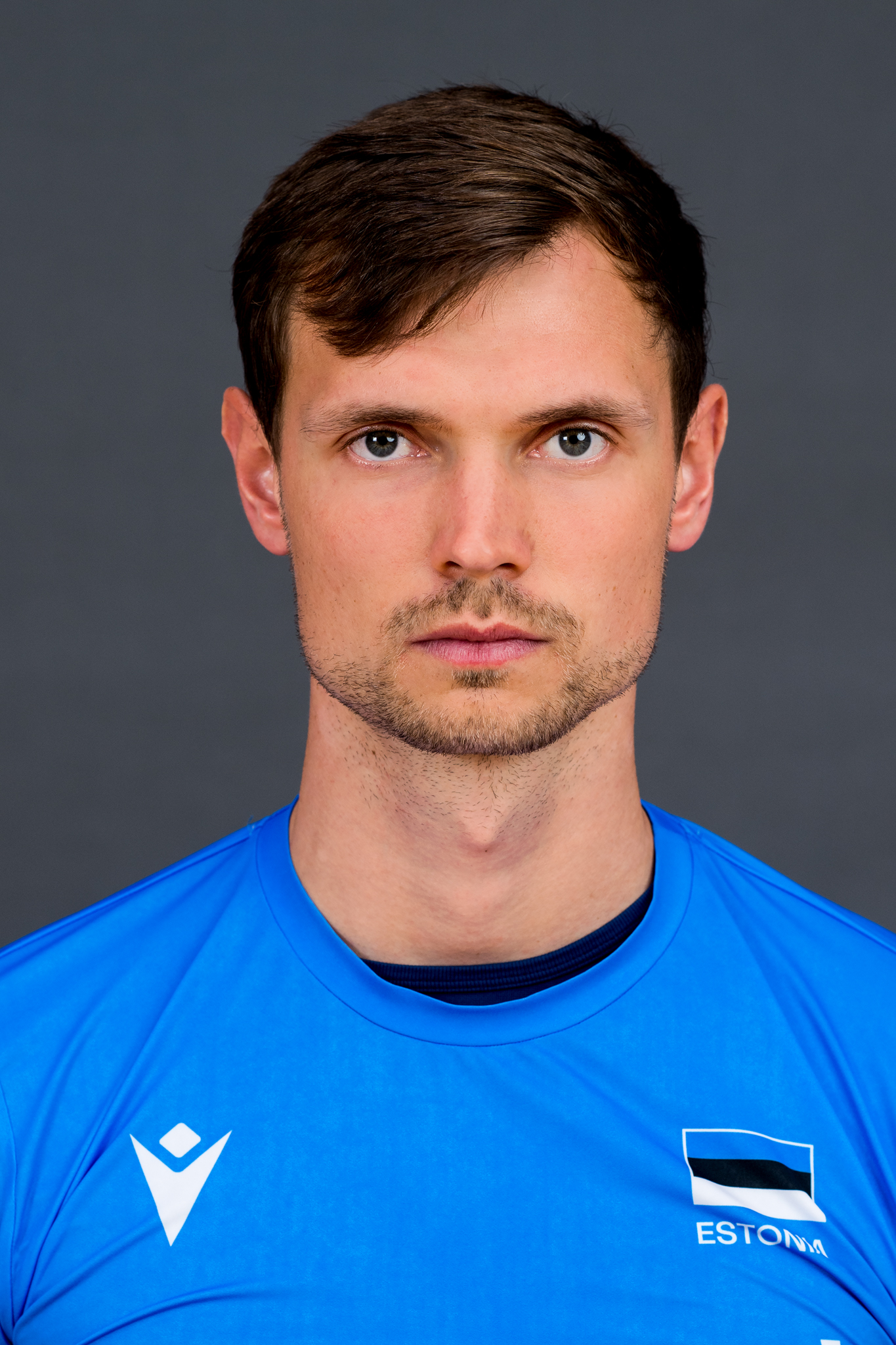

Personal information
- Full name: Johan Vahter
- Nationality: Estonian

National team
| Estonia |

Johan Vahter (born 19 November 1995) is an Estonian volleyball player. He is a member of the Estonian national team and represented his country at the 2023 European Volleyball Championships.
