= Hindrek Pulk =

Estonian volleyball player (born 1990)

Personal information
- Nationality: Estonian
- Born: November 7, 1990 (age 35)
- Height: 193 cm (6 ft 4 in)
- Weight: 86 kg (190 lb)
- Spike: 336 cm (132 in)
- Block: 321 cm (126 in)

Volleyball information
- Position: Opposite

National team
Estonia

Hindrek Pulk (born 7 November 1990) is a retired Estonian professional volleyball player. He was a member of the Estonian national team until 2021 and represented his country at the 2019 European Volleyball Championships.

He started his professional career in club Selver Tallinn.
