= Marx Aru =

Estonian volleyball player (born 2002)

Personal information
- Full name: Marx Aru
- Nationality: Estonian

National team
Estonia

Marx Aru (born 8 November 2002) is an Estonian volleyball player. He is a member of the Estonian national team and represented his country at the 2023 European Volleyball Championships.
