= Renet Vanker =

Estonian volleyball player (born 1998)

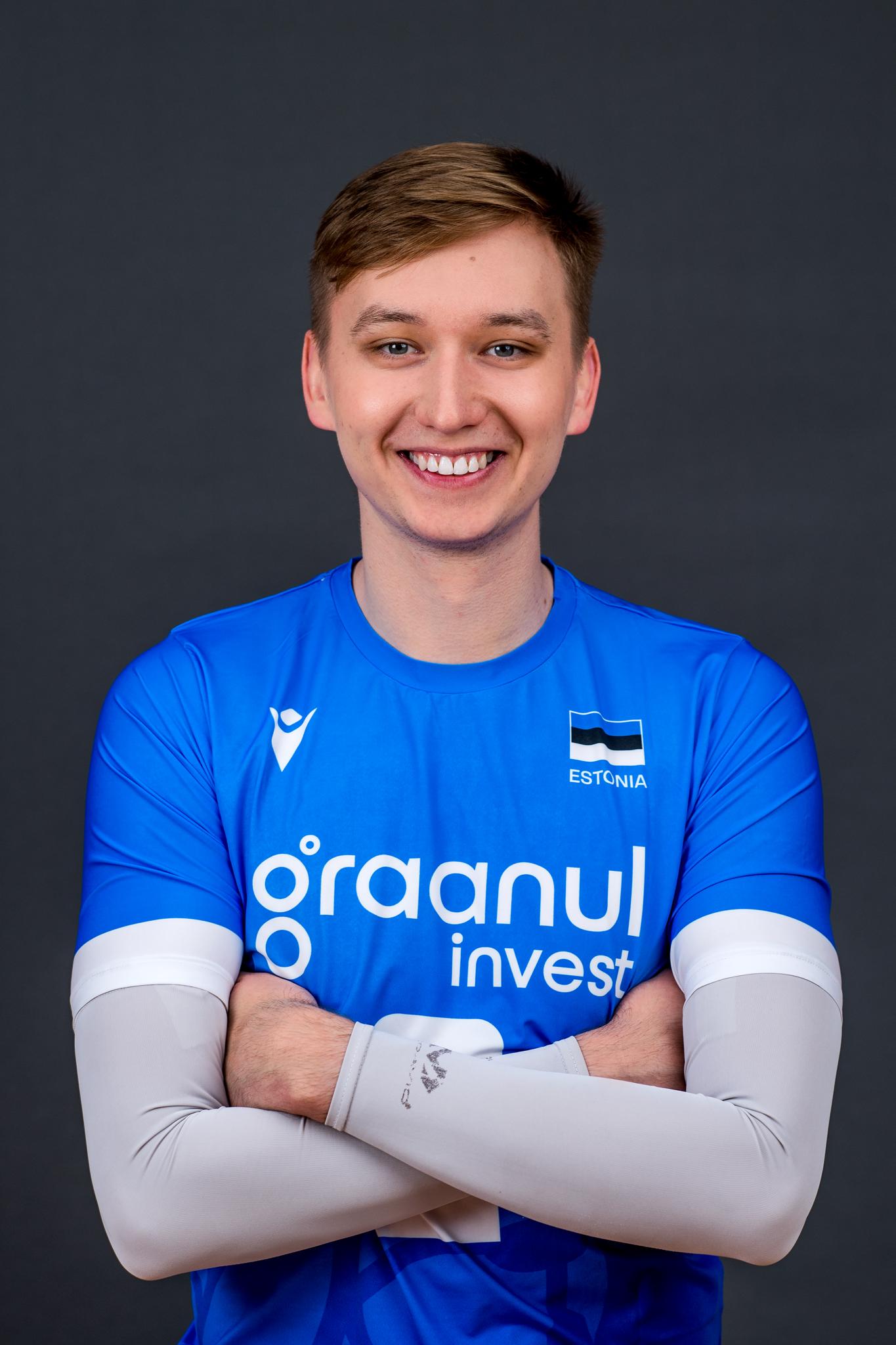

Personal information
- Nationality: Estonian
- Born: 22 September 1999 (age 27); Tallinn, Estonia

National team
Estonia

Renet Vanker (born 22 September 1998) is an Estonian volleyball player. He is a member of the Estonian national team and represented his country at the 2021 and 2023 European Volleyball Championships.
