= Karli Allik =

Estonian volleyball player (born 1996)

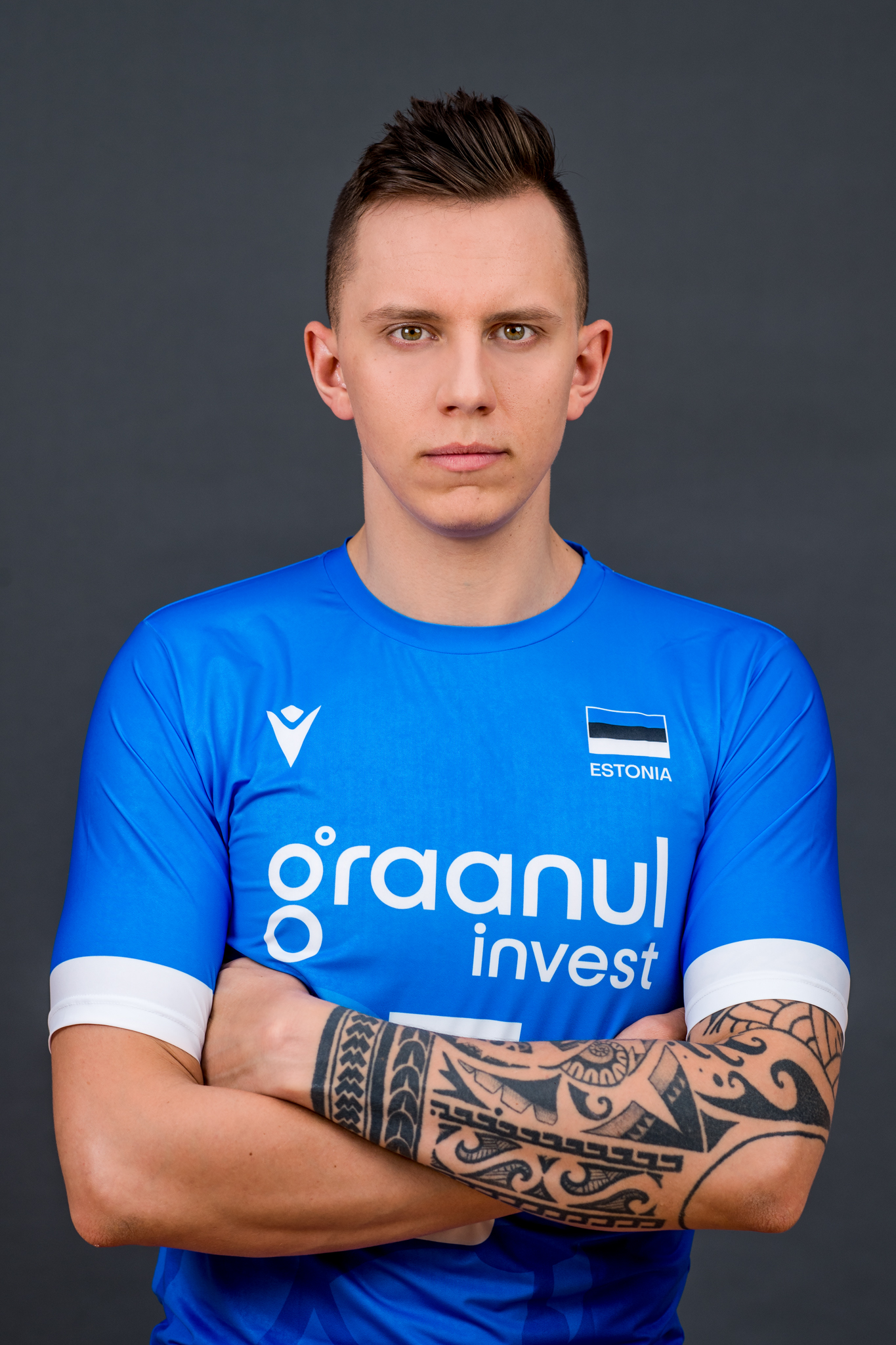

Personal information
- Full name: Karli Allik
- Nationality: Estonian
- Born: 25 September 1996 (age 30); Kuressaare, Estonia

National team
| Estonia |

Karli Allik (born 25 September 1996) is an Estonian volleyball player. He is a member of the Estonian national team and represented his country at the 2021 and 2023 European Volleyball Championships.
