= Pärnu VK =

Estonian volleyball club

Pärnu
- Full name: Pärnu Võrkpalliklubi
- Founded: 1997
- Ground: Pärnu Sports Hall (Capacity: 1,820)
- Chairman: Reio Tilk
- Manager: Rainer Vassiljev
- League: Baltic Volleyball League; Estonian Volleyball League
- 2024–25: 2nd (Baltic League); 3rd (Estonian League); 1st (Estonian Cup)
- Website: Club home page

Championships
- 1 Baltic Championship; 8 Estonian Championships; 12 Estonian Cups

Pärnu Võrkpalliklubi is a professional Estonian volleyball team based in Pärnu, Estonia. It plays in the Baltic Volleyball League and the Estonian Volleyball League. The team won the 2015–16 Baltic Volleyball League title.

== Team roster ==
=== 2021/2022 ===
Head coach:	(Estonia) Avo Keel
Assistant:	(Estonia) Karl Erik Eisenschmidt
Assistant:	(Estonia) Toomas Jasmin
Assistant:	(Estonia) Tarmo Tiits

No.	Name	Date of birth	Position
1	(Estonia) Markus Uuskari (C)	April 22, 1997 (age 27)	outside hitter
2	(Estonia) Silver Maar	February 11, 1999 (age 26)	libero
3	(Estonia) Markus Kohtla	September 28, 2004 (age 20)	opposite
4	(Latvia) Toms Švans	August 2, 1993 (age 31)	middle blocker
5	(Estonia) Kristo Joosep Peterson	August 13, 2002 (age 22)	middle blocker
6	(Estonia) Tony Tammiksaar	July 25, 2001 (age 23)	outside hitter
7	(Ukraine) Borys Zhukov	August 6, 1996 (age 28)	outside hitter
9	(Estonia) Richard Voogel	May 15, 2001 (age 23)	setter
10	(Estonia) Kristofer Rünt	November 7, 2004 (age 20)	setter
11	(Brazil) Jo Mauricio Da Silva Neto	December 11, 2000 (age 24)	setter
12	(Estonia) Ivory Õuekallas	November 4, 2001 (age 23)	outside hitter
14	(Brazil) Gabriel Cavalcante	April 14, 1999 (age 26)	outside hitter
15	(Estonia) Tõnis Hendrik Tallo	August 8, 2005 (age 19)	outside hitter
18	(Ukraine) Bohdan Mazenko	May 18, 1996 (age 28)	middle blocker

Team roster – season 2020/2021
No.	Name	Date of birth	Position
2	(Estonia) Silver Maar	February 11, 1999	libero
3	(Estonia) Taavet Leppik	July 31, 1993	outside hitter
4	(Latvia) Toms Švans	August 2, 1993	middle blocker
5	(Estonia) Martti Keel (C)	January 30, 1992	setter
6	(Estonia) Tony Tammiksaar	July 25, 2001	outside hitter
7	(Estonia) Kaur Erik Kais	July 17, 2002	outside hitter
9	(Estonia) Richard Voogel	May 15, 2001	setter
10	(Estonia) Karl Mattias Prangli	January 3, 2002	libero
11	(Estonia) Sander Kasela	February 7, 2002	middle blocker
12	(Estonia) Markus Veltson	September 2, 1998	middle blocker
16	(Latvia) Kristaps Platačs	September 28, 1999	opposite
17	(Latvia) Atvars Ozoliņš	December 17, 1998	outside hitter
21	(Estonia) Harri Palmar	October 26, 1989	middle blocker
Head coach: (Estonia) Avo Keel; Assistant: (Estonia) Karl Erik Eisenschmidt; Assistant: (Estonia) Toomas Jasmin; Assistant: (Estonia) Tarmo Tiits; Assistant: (Latvia) Toms Zvonkovs

Team roster – season 2019/2020
No.	Name	Date of birth	Position
2	(Estonia) Silver Maar	February 11, 1999	libero
3	(Brazil) Eder Levi Kock	July 4, 1993	middle blocker
4	(Estonia) Kaur Erik Kais	July 17, 2002	outside hitter
5	(Estonia) Martti Keel (C)	January 30, 1992	setter
6	(Estonia) Tony Tammiksaar	July 25, 2001	outside hitter
8	(Estonia) Taavet Leppik	July 31, 1993	outside hitter
9	(Estonia) Richard Voogel	May 15, 2001	setter
10	(Estonia) Mattias Rahuoja	August 24, 2001	middle blocker
11	(Estonia) Siim Ennemuist	December 5, 1989	middle blocker
14	(Estonia) Mhait Martin Pool	April 4, 1997	middle blocker
15	(Brazil) Ygor Duarte	January 16, 1989	outside hitter
16	(Russia) Andrey Gvozdev	March 28, 1991	middle blocker
17	(Latvia) Kristaps Platačs	September 28, 1999	opposite
18	(Estonia) Allar Keskülla	April 1, 2001	libero
Head coach: (Estonia) Avo Keel; Assistant: (Estonia) Karl Erik Eisenschmidt; Assistant: (Estonia) Toomas Jasmin; Assistant: (Estonia) Tarmo Tiits; Assistant: (Latvia) Toms Zvonkovs

== Honours ==
Baltic League

- Winners (1): 2016
- Runners-up: 2011, 2013, 2017, 2018, 2025

Estonian League

- Winners (8): 1993, 2000, 2001, 2002, 2003, 2004, 2015, 2019
- Runners-up: 1994, 1995, 1996, 1997, 1999, 2010, 2013, 2016, 2022

Estonian Cup

- Winners (12): 1992, 1993, 1999, 2000, 2001, 2002, 2003, 2012, 2014, 2015, 2016, 2024
- Runners-up: 1998, 2004, 2009, 2010, 2018

== Head coaches ==
- 1992–2001 (Estonia) Andrei Ojamets
- 2001–2004 (Finland) Pasi Sakari Rautio
- 2005–2011 (Estonia) Andrei Ojamets
- 2011–2014 (Estonia) Urmas Tali
- 2014–2022 (Estonia) Avo Keel
- 2022–2024 (Estonia) Toomas Jasmin
- 2024– (Estonia) Rainer Vassiljev

== Notable players ==
- (Estonia) Kristjan Kais (4 seasons: 1992–1996)
- (Estonia) Avo Keel (5 seasons: 1999–2004)
- (Estonia) Argo Meresaar (9 seasons: 1996–2004; 2007–2008)
- (Estonia) Jaanus Nõmmsalu (8 seasons: 1997–2004; 2010–2011)
- (Estonia) Raimo Pajusalu (6 seasons: 1998–2004)
- (Ukraine) Dmytro Pashytskyy (1 season: 2009–2010)
- (Estonia) Hindrek Pulk (3 seasons: 2014–2017)
- (Estonia) Andrus Raadik (12 seasons: 2006–2016; 2023–2025)
- (Estonia) Janis Sirelpuu (2 seasons: 2003–2004; 2009–2010)
- (Estonia) Timo Tammemaa (2 seasons: 2014–2016)
- (Estonia) Renee Teppan (4 seasons: 2010–2012, 2023–2025)
- (Estonia) Andres Toobal (4 seasons: 2006–2009; 2011–2012)
- (Estonia) Kert Toobal (4 seasons: 1998–2002)
- (Estonia) Rivo Vesik (5 seasons: 1998–2003)
