= Estonia men's national volleyball team =

National volleyball team

Estonia
- Nickname(s): Sinilõvid (Blue Lions)
- Association: Estonian Volleyball Federation
- Confederation: CEV
- Head coach: Alar Rikberg
- FIVB ranking: 30 (1 October 2026)

Uniforms
Home	Away

World Championship
- Appearances: 1 (First in 2027)

European Championship
- Appearances: 7 (First in 2009)
- Best result: 11th (2015)
- volley.ee (in Estonian)

Estonia men's national volleyball team
Medal record

European Volleyball League
Gold medal – first place	2016 Bulgaria	
Gold medal – first place	2018 Czech Republic	
Bronze medal – third place	2021 Belgium	

Challenger Cup
Bronze medal – third place	2018 Portugal	

The Estonia men's national volleyball team (Estonian: Eesti meeste võrkpallikoondis) is controlled by the Estonian Volleyball Federation (Eesti Võrkpalli Liit) and represents Estonia in international volleyball competitions. The team has reached the European Championships seven times (2009, 2011, 2015, 2017, 2019, 2021, 2023).

== Results ==
Champions Runners up Third place Fourth place

=== World Championship ===
World Championship record
Year	Round	Position	GP	MW	ML	SW	SL	Squad
1949–1990	Did not enter due to Soviet occupation							
(Greece) 1994	Did not qualify							
(Japan) 1998	Did not qualify							
(Argentina) 2002	Did not qualify							
(Japan) 2006	Did not qualify							
(Italy) 2010	Did not qualify							
(Poland) 2014	Did not qualify							
(Italy) (Bulgaria) 2018	Did not qualify							
(Poland) (Slovenia) 2022	Did not qualify							
(Philippines) 2025	Did not qualify							
(Poland) 2027	Qualified							
(Qatar) 2029	Future event							
Total:1/22								—

=== European Championship ===
European Championship record									Qualification		
Year	Round	Position	Pld	W	L	SW	SL	Squad	Pld	W	L
1948–1991	Did not enter due to Soviet occupation										
(Finland) 1993	Did not qualify								2 (Note: Eliminatory Matches against Ukraine.)	1	1
1995–1999	Did not enter										
(Czech Republic) 2001	Did not qualify								6 (Note: 2nd place in Pool 1 of Category B, not promoted.)	4	2
(Germany) 2003	Did not qualify								6 (Note: 1st place in Pool 2 of Category B, promoted to Category A.)	6	0
(Italy) (Serbia and Montenegro) 2005	Did not qualify								6	1	5
(Russia) 2007	Did not qualify								8	4	4
(Turkey) 2009	Group stage	14th place	3	0	3	2	9	Squad	6	5	1
(Austria) (Czech Republic) 2011	Playoffs	12th place	4	1	3	3	9	Squad	8	6	2
(Denmark) (Poland) 2013	Did not qualify								6	2	4
(Bulgaria) (Italy) 2015	Playoffs	11th place	4	1	3	6	9	Squad	8	6	2
(Poland) 2017	Group stage	13th place	3	0	3	4	9	Squad	8	5	3
(France) (Slovenia) (Belgium) (Netherlands) 2019	Group stage	24th place	5	0	5	2	15	Squad	4	4	0
(Poland) (Czech Republic) (Estonia) (Finland) 2021	Group stage	21st place	5	1	4	6	14	Squad	Host country		
(Italy) (Bulgaria) (North Macedonia) (Israel) 2023	Group stage	20th place	5	1	4	4	14	Squad	4	2	2
(Bulgaria) (Finland) (Italy) (Romania) 2026	Group stage	17th place	5	2	3	8	12	Squad	4	3	1
(N/A) (N/A) (N/A) (Montenegro) 2028	To be determined										
Total	8/34	0 Titles	34	6	28	35	91		76	49	27

=== World League / Nations League ===
World League record
Year	Round	Position	Pld	W	L	SW	SL	Squad
1990–2015	Did not enter							
(Poland) 2016	Did not qualify							
(Brazil) 2017	Final four (Group 3)	1st place (25th place)	8	7	1	22	7	Squad
Total	1/28	0 Titles	8	7	1	22	7	
Nations League record
2018–2019	Did not qualify							
(Italy) 2020	Cancelled due to the COVID-19 pandemic							
2021–2026	Did not qualify							
Total	0/8	0 Titles	0	0	0	0	0	

From 2018, the World League was replaced by the Nations League.

=== Challenger Cup ===
Challenger Cup record
Year	Round	Position	Pld	W	L	SW	SL	Squad
(Portugal) 2018	Final round	3rd place	4	2	2	7	7	Squad
(Slovenia) 2019	Did not qualify							
2020–2021	Cancelled due to the COVID-19 pandemic							
2022–2024	Did not qualify							
Total	1/5	0 Titles	4	2	2	7	7	

=== European League ===
European League record
Year	Round	Position	Pld	W	L	SW	SL	Squad
(Czech Republic) 2004	Did not enter							
(Russia) 2005	League round	8th place	12	2	10	13	33	Squad
(Turkey) 2006	League round	8th place	12	1	11	7	34	Squad
2007–2014	Did not enter							
(Poland) 2015	Final four	4th place	12	10	2	30	13	Squad
(Bulgaria) 2016	Final four	Champions	8	8	0	24	7	Squad
(Denmark) 2017	Did not enter							
(Czech Republic) 2018	Final four	Champions	8	7	1	21	6	Squad
(Estonia) 2019	Final four	4th place	8	2	6	9	22	Squad
(Belgium) 2020	Cancelled due to the COVID-19 pandemic							
(Belgium) 2021	Final four	3rd place	8	7	1	23	7	Squad
(Croatia) 2022	League round	5th place	6	4	2	13	10	Squad
(Croatia) 2023	League round	8th place	6	3	3	11	11	Squad
(Croatia) 2024	Final four	4th place	8	4	4	17	15	Squad
(Czech Republic) 2025	Did not enter							
(Finland) (Netherlands) 2026	League round	6th place	6	5	1	17	4	Squad
Total	11/22	2 Titles	94	53	41	185	162	

== Current squad ==
The following is the roster of Estonia men's national volleyball team for the 2023 Men's European Volleyball Championship

- Head coach: Alar Rikberg
- Assistant coach: (Estonia) Avo Keel
- Assistant coach: (Latvia) Lauris Iecelenieks
- Physiotherapist: (Latvia) Toms Zvonkvos
- Physiotherapist: (Estonia) Mark Leinfeld
- Athletic trainer: (Estonia) Ott-Erik Kalmus
- Statistic: (Estonia) Märt Pajusalu
- Team manager: (Estonia) Robin Ristmäe

No.	Name	Date of birth	Height	Position	Spike	Block	Club
1	Henri Treial	28 May 1992	2.02 m	Middle blocker	363 cm (143 in)	344 cm (135 in)	(Belgium) Knack Roeselare
2	Renet Vanker	22 September 1998	1.93 m	Setter	333 cm (131 in)	319 cm (126 in)	(Greece) Aris Thessaloniki Volleyball Club
3	Karli Allik	25 September 1996	1.92 m	Outside spiker	340 cm (130 in)	325 cm (128 in)	(Israel) Hapoel Mate-Asher Ako
6	Andres Jefanov	17 May 2008	2.07 m	Opposite	340 cm (130 in)	310 cm (120 in)	(Germany) SWD Powervolleys Düren
7	Renee Teppan	26 September 1993	1.97 m	Opposite	360 cm (140 in)	345 cm (136 in)	(Turkey) İstanbul Büyükşehir Belediyespor
8	Märt Tammearu	17 March 2001	1.96 m	Outside spiker	345 cm (136 in)	320 cm (130 in)	(Japan) Voreas Hokkaido
9	Robert Täht	15 August 1993	1.92 m	Outside spiker	352 cm (139 in)	330 cm (130 in)	(Brazil) Vôlei São José dos Campos
10	Silver Maar	11 February 1999	1.84 m	Libero	315 cm (124 in)	300 cm (120 in)	(Czech Republic) VK Dukla Liberec
11	Oliver Venno	23 May 1990	2.10 m	Opposite	355 cm (140 in)	335 cm (132 in)	Kuwait Club
11	Johan Vahter	19 November 1995	1.90 m	Libero	322 cm (127 in)	314 cm (124 in)	(Estonia) Selver/TalTech
17	Timo Tammemaa	18 November 1991	2.02 m	Middle blocker	363 cm (143 in)	343 cm (135 in)	(Germany) Berlin Recycling Volleys
19	Andri Aganits	7 September 1993	2.07 m	Middle blocker	367 cm (144 in)	340 cm (130 in)	(Estonia) Selver/TalTech
22	Markkus Keel	18 August 1995	1.91 m	Setter	331 cm (130 in)	320 cm (130 in)	(Bulgaria) VC Cherno More Baske
30	Marx Aru	8 November 2002	2.03 m	Middle blocker	330 cm (130 in)	320 cm (130 in)	(Switzerland) Volley Schönenwerd

== Statistics ==
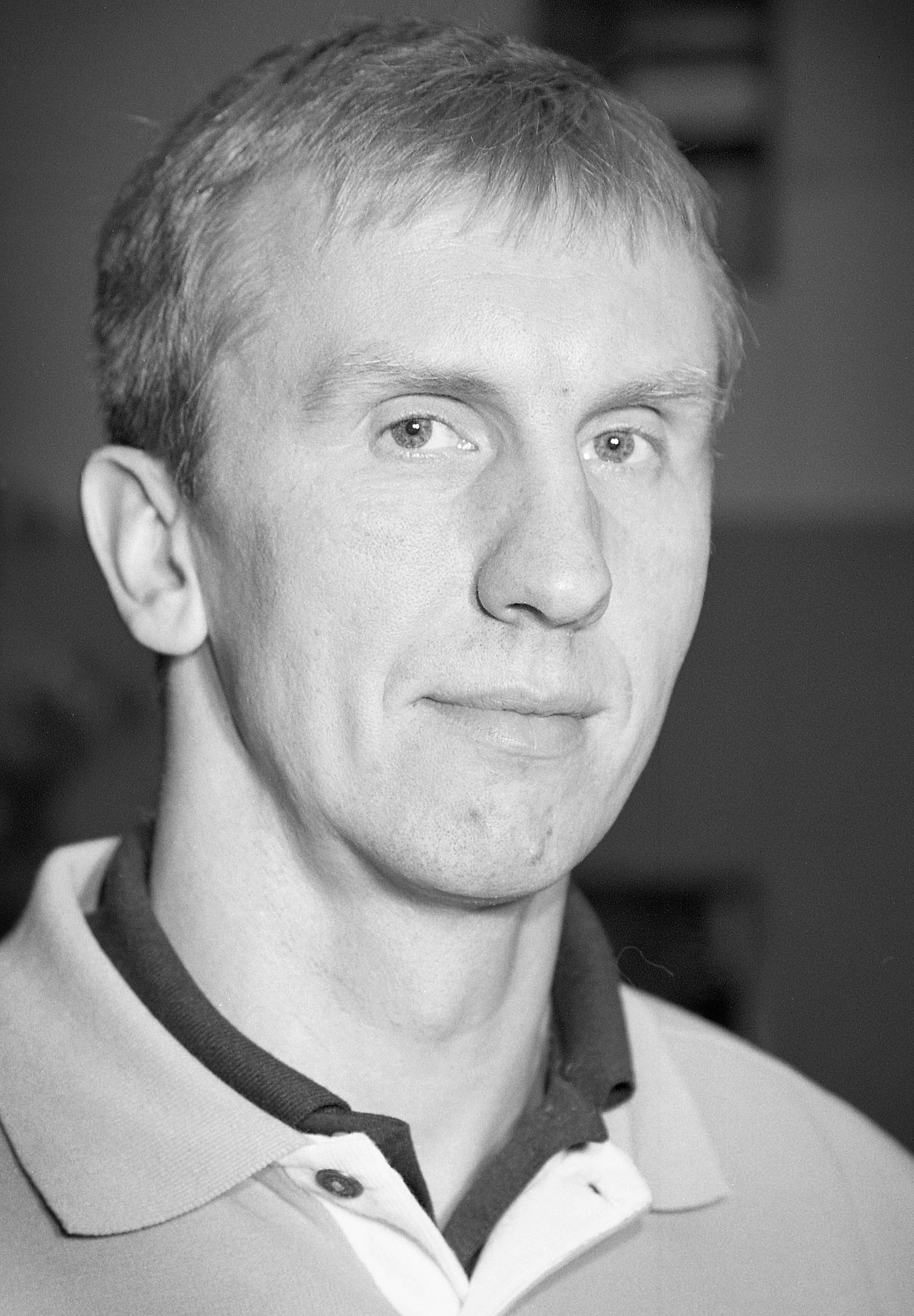
Avo Keel, head coach from 2004 to 2014.

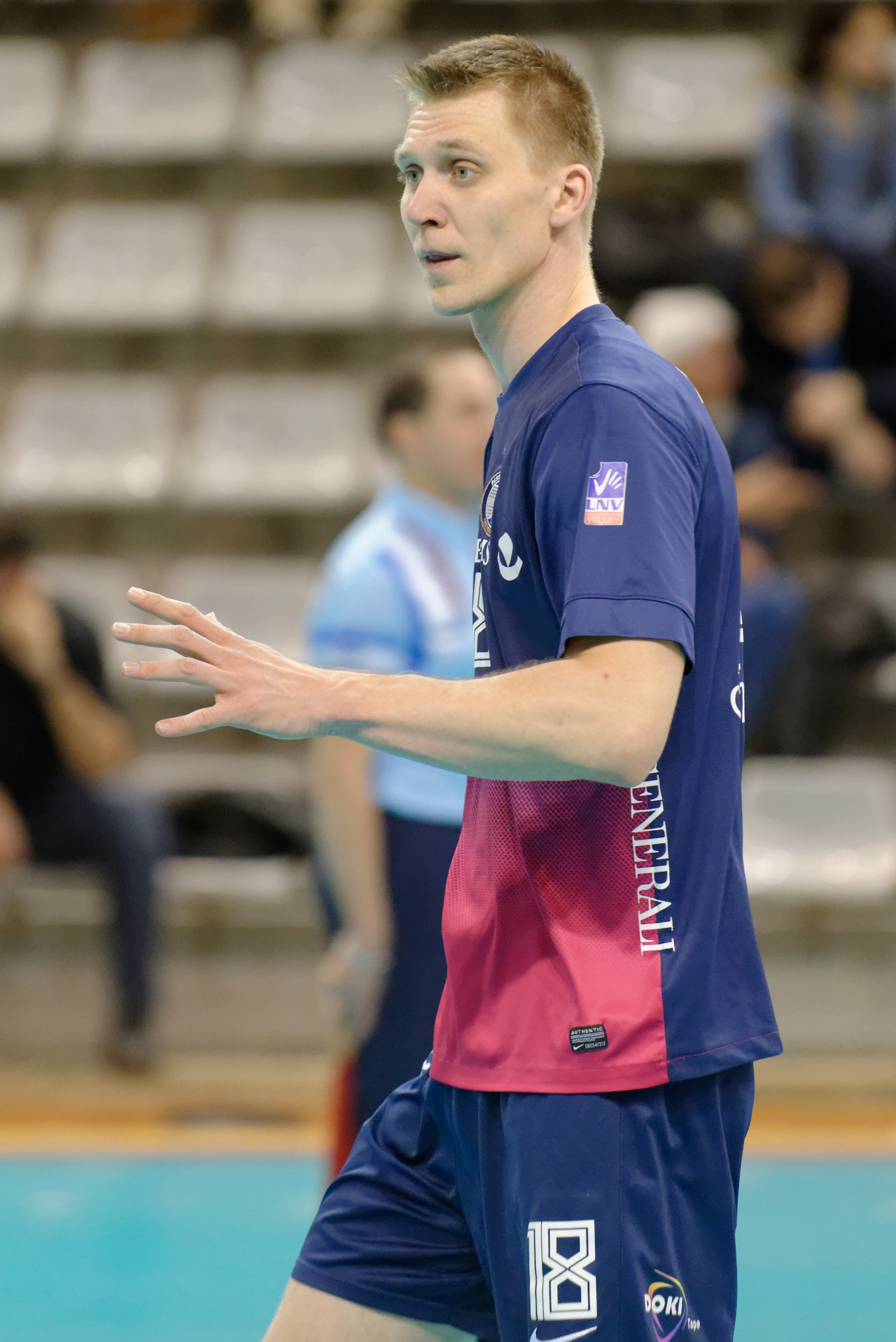
Ardo Kreek has appeared in 244 games for the national team.

=== Most games for Estonia ===
As of 24 August 2024.

Rank	Player	Years	Games
1	Kert Toobal	2001–2021	308
2	**Ardo Kreek**	2004–2022	244
3	**Oliver Venno**	2008–present	210
4	**Andri Aganits**	2013–present	198
5	Rait Rikberg	2007–2021	183
6	Argo Meresaar	2000–2013	175
6	**Renee Teppan**	2014–present	175
8	**Keith Pupart**	2006–2016	170
9	**Robert Täht**	2013–present	165
10	Raimo Pajusalu	2000–2014	160
11	Janis Sirelpuu	1998–2011	154
12	**Henri Treial**	2015–present	151
13	**Timo Tammemaa**	2015–present	147
14	Veiko Lember	1998–2009	143
15	Jaanus Nõmmsalu	1999–2013	133
16	Kristjan Õuekallas	2003–2013	124
17	Eerik Jago	2000–2011	123
18	Sten Esna	2003–2011	112
18	Andres Toobal	2010–2017	112
18	**Silver Maar**	2018–present	112
21	**Kristo Kollo**	2014–2022	108
22	**Karli Allik**	2016–present	103

Players in bold are still active at club level.
All players with over 100 games are listed in the table.

=== Head coaches ===
As of 29 August 2024.

Years	Head coach	Pld	W	L	Win %	Major NT tournament appearances	Achievements
1992–1996	(n/a)	22	13	9	59.1		
1996–2000	(Estonia) Laimons Raudsepp	27	9	18	33.3		
2000–2001	(Estonia) Andres Toode	20	9	11	45.0		
2001–2003	(Estonia) Andres Skuin	15	8	7	53.3		
2003–2004	(Finland) Pasi Sakari Rautio	39	15	24	38.5		
2004–2014	(Estonia) Avo Keel	133	57	76	42.9	European Championships: 2009, 2011	
2014–2019	(Romania) Gheorghe Crețu	140	92	48	65.7	European Championships: 2015, 2017, 2019	(gold) 2016 EL, (gold) 2018 EL, (bronze) 2018 CC
2019–2021	(France) Cédric Énard	21	16	5	76.2	European Championships: 2021	(bronze) 2021 EL
2021–2023	(Italy) Fabio Soli	17	8	9	47.1		
2023–	(Estonia) Alar Rikberg	33	20	13	60.6	European Championships: 2023	

Major NT tournaments include the Olympic Games, the World Championships and the European Championships.
