= Oliver Venno =

Estonian volleyball player (born 1990)

Personal information
- Nationality: Estonian
- Born: 23 May 1990 (age 36); Tartu, Estonia
- Height: 2.10 m (6 ft 11 in)
- Weight: 110 kg (243 lb)
- Spike: 355 cm (140 in)
- Block: 330 cm (130 in)

Volleyball information
- Position: Opposite hitter / Outside hitter
- Current club: Kuwait SC
- Number: 11

Career
Years	Teams
2006–2009; 2009–2010; 2010–2012; 2012; 2012–2013; 2013–2014; 2014–2015; 2015–2016; 2016–2018; 2018–2020; 2020–2022; 2022–2025; 2025–	(Estonia) Pere Leib Tartu (Slovenia) ACH Volley Bled (Germany) VfB Friedrichshafen (Montenegro) Budvanska Rivijera Budva (France) Rennes Volley 35 (Russia) Prikamye Perm (Austria) Hypo Tirol Innsbruck (Turkey) Ziraat Bankası Ankara (Turkey) Maliye Milli Piyango (Turkey) Galatasaray İstanbul; Police SC Qatar; Al Rayyan; Kuwait SC

National team
2008–	Estonia
Honours
Men's volleyball
Representing Estonia
European League
Gold medal – first place	2016 Bulgaria
Gold medal – first place	2018 Czech Republic
Bronze medal – third place	2021 Belgium
Challenger Cup
Bronze medal – third place	2018 Portugal
- Last updated: 22 December 2025

Oliver Venno (born 23 May 1990) is an Estonian volleyball player currently playing for Kuwait SC of the Kuwaiti Volleyball League. He mostly plays at the opposite hitter position but has also played at the outside hitter position on numerous occasions.

== Club career ==
=== Early years ===
Venno was born in Tartu, and started his career in hometown club Pere Leib Tartu at the age of 16. In addition to three Estonian League silver medals he won the Estonian Cup in 2008 with the and reached the finals of the Baltic League twice. Venno was named the Best Young Estonian Volleyball Player in 2008 and 2009.

=== European clubs ===
In summer of 2009 Venno signed with ACH Volley Bled of Slovenia. With the Bled team Venno won the Slovenian League, the Slovenian Cup and the MEVZA Cup. They also reached the Final Four of the 2009–10 CEV Champions League making Venno the first Estonian to play in the semi-finals of the Champions League. In 2010 and 2011 Venno won the Estonian Volleyball Player of the Year award. From 2010 to 2012 he played in Germany for VfB Friedrichshafen and won the German League and the German Cup once. Venno started the 2012–13 season in the Montenegrin top team Budvanska Rivijera Budva. He left the team in December and joined his compatriots Raimo Pajusalu and Keith Pupart in the French team Rennes Volley 35.

For the 2013–14 season Venno signed with Prikamye Perm of the Russian Volleyball Super League. In June 2014 Venno moved to Austria and signed a deal with local powerhouse Hypo Tirol Innsbruck. With Hypo Tirol team he won the Austrian League without losing a single game during the season. He also added a second MEVZA Cup win to his account.

=== Turkish clubs ===
In July 2015 Venno signed with Ziraat Bankası Ankara of the Turkish Men's Volleyball League. For the next season he moved to another Ankara-based team Maliye Milli Piyango. Venno was the top scorer of the league and helped his team to 5th-place finish. Venno stayed with the team for another season and helped Maliye Piyango to the final of the Turkish Cup for the first time in the club's history as they lost to Halkbank Ankara with the score 2–3. Venno and Maliye Piyango also reached to the semi-finals of the 2017–18 CEV Challenge Cup where they lost to eventual winner Bunge Ravenna in the golden set.

In May 2018 Venno signed with one of the top Turkish teams, Galatasaray İstanbul. Venno and Galatasaray played in the final of the 2018–19 CEV Cup where they lost to Italian team Diatec Trentino. Venno was the Best Scorer of the competition totaling 190 points in 10 matches. He stayed with Galatasaray for the next season and started off with the Turkish Super Cup title. However, the season was cut short due to the COVID-19 pandemic, which forced to cancel all competitions.

=== Qatari clubs ===
After five years in Turkey Venno signed with Police SC Qatar of the Qatari Volleyball League in June 2020. He helped the team win two consecutive league titles and the 2022 Gulf Clubs Championship, where he was named MVP of the tournament. In 2022 Police SC Qatar also won their first Emir of Qatar Cup with Venno scoring 41 points on the final against Al Arabi.

After two seasons with Police SC Qatar Venno signed with another Qatari top team Al Rayyan. Al Rayyan won the inaugural West Asia Men's Club Volleyball Championship after defeating Kuwait SC 3–0 in the final with Venno scoring 19 points. He was also named the best opposite hitter of the tournament. The season was also successful domestically as Venno helped Al Rayyan win the national championship and the Emir of Qatar Cup.

In February 2024 Al Rayyan won the West Asian Men's Volleyball Championship for the second consecutive time, once again defeating Al Kuwait SC 3–0 in the final and Venno was named MVP of the tournament.

== National team ==
Oliver Venno represented the Estonian youth teams in the U16, U18 and U20 level. He is a member of the Estonian national team since 2008 and has represented his country at the 2009, 2011, 2015, 2017, 2021 and 2023 Men's European Volleyball Championships. With the national team Venno also won the 2016 and 2018 European Volleyball League titles.

Venno has also successfully represented Estonia in beach volleyball. Together with Kristo Kollo he won the U18 Beach European Championship in 2007 and U19 Beach World Championship in 2008.

== Sporting achievements ==
=== Clubs ===
CEV Cup

- 2018/2019 - with Galatasaray İstanbul

MEVZA League

- 2009/2010 – with ACH Volley Bled
- 2014/2015 – with Hypo Tirol Innsbruck

Baltic League

- 2007/2008 – with Pere Leib Tartu
- 2008/2009 – with Pere Leib Tartu

GCC Volleyball Club Championship

- 2022 – with Police SC Qatar

West Asia Men's Club Volleyball Championship

- 2023 – with Al Rayyan
- 2024 – with Al Rayyan
- 2025 – with Al Rayyan

National championship

- 2006/2007 Estonian Championship, with Pere Leib Tartu
- 2007/2008 Estonian Championship, with Pere Leib Tartu
- 2008/2009 Estonian Championship, with Pere Leib Tartu
- 2009/2010 Slovenian Championship, with ACH Volley Bled
- 2010/2011 German Championship, with VfB Friedrichshafen
- 2014/2015 Austrian Championship, with Hypo Tirol Innsbruck
- 2018/2019 Turkish Championship, with Galatasaray İstanbul
- 2019/2020 Qatari Championship, with Police SC Qatar
- 2020/2021 Qatari Championship, with Police SC Qatar
- 2021/2022 Qatari Championship, with Police SC Qatar
- 2022/2023 Qatari Championship, with Al Rayyan
- 2023/2024 Qatari Championship, with Al Rayyan
- 2024/2025 Qatari Championship, with Al Rayyan

National cup

- 2006/2007 Estonian Cup, with Pere Leib Tartu
- 2007/2008 Estonian Cup, with Pere Leib Tartu
- 2008/2009 Estonian Cup, with Pere Leib Tartu
- 2009/2010 Slovenian Cup, with ACH Volley Bled
- 2010/2011 German Cup, with VfB Friedrichshafen
- 2011/2012 German Cup, with VfB Friedrichshafen
- 2017/2018 Turkish Cup, with Maliye Milli Piyango
- 2018/2019 Turkish Cup, with Galatasaray İstanbul
- 2019/2020 Turkish Super Cup, with Galatasaray İstanbul
- 2020/2021 Qatari Cup, with Police SC Qatar
- 2021/2022 Emir Cup, with Police SC Qatar
- 2022/2023 Emir Cup, with Al Rayyan

=== National team ===
- 2016 European League
- 2018 European League
- 2018 Challenger Cup
- 2021 European League

=== Individual ===
- 2008 Young Estonian Volleyball Player of the Year
- 2009 Young Estonian Volleyball Player of the Year
- 2010 Estonian Volleyball Player of the Year
- 2011 Estonian Volleyball Player of the Year
- 2018 European League – Best outside hitter
- 2019 CEV Cup – Best scorer
- 2021 Estonian Volleyball Player of the Year
- 2022 GCC Volleyball Club Championship – Most valuable player
- 2023 West Asia Men's Club Volleyball Championship – Best opposite hitter
- 2024 West Asia Men's Club Volleyball Championship – Most valuable player
- 2025 West Asia Men's Club Volleyball Championship – Best Scorer
