= 2018–19 Qatar Volleyball league =

- League: Qatar Volleyball league
- Sport: Volleyball
- Duration: Oct 22, 2018 – Mar 26, 2019
- Number of games: 90
- Number of teams: 10

League
- League champions: Police SC
- Runners-up: Al Rayyan

Qatar Volleyball league seasons
- ← 2017–18 2019–20 →

The 2018–19 Qatar Volleyball league was the 40th season of the Qatar Volleyball league, the highest professional volleyball league in Qatar. A total of 10 teams will compete in the league. The season began on 22 October 2018 and is scheduled to conclude on 26 March 2019. Al Rayyan are the defending champions.

Police SC won their second Qatar Volleyball league title.

== League table ==
Pos	Team	Pld	W	L	Pts	SW	SL	SR	SPW	SPL	SPR
1	Police SC	18	18	0	53	54	6	9.000	1489	1157	1.287
2	Al Rayyan	18	16	2	47	48	14	3.429	1494	1287	1.161
3	Al Arabi	18	14	4	43	46	13	3.538	1424	1107	1.286
4	Al Wakra	18	12	6	32	39	32	1.219	1514	1564	0.968
5	Qatar SC	18	9	9	26	33	35	0.943	1582	1547	1.023
6	Al Ahli	18	8	10	25	31	32	0.969	1427	1366	1.045
7	Al Gharafa	18	7	11	20	30	40	0.750	1486	1604	0.926
8	Al Shamal	18	3	15	10	16	50	0.320	1312	1563	0.839
9	Al Khor	18	2	16	10	16	49	0.327	1317	1518	0.868
10	Al Sadd	18	1	17	4	11	53	0.208	1194	1526	0.782

== Final standings ==
Rank	Team	Qualification
1st place, gold medalist(s)	Police SC	Asian Club Championship; 2019 Arab Clubs Championship; 2019 Qatar Cup
2nd place, silver medalist(s)	Al Rayyan	2019 Arab Clubs Championship; 2019 Qatar Cup
3rd place, bronze medalist(s)	Al Arabi	2019 Qatar Cup
4	Al Wakra	2019 Qatar Cup
5	Qatar SC	
6	Al Ahli	
7	Al Gharafa	
8	Al Shamal	
9	Al Khor	
10	Al Sadd	
