= Salvador Hidalgo Oliva =

Cuban volleyball player (born 1985)

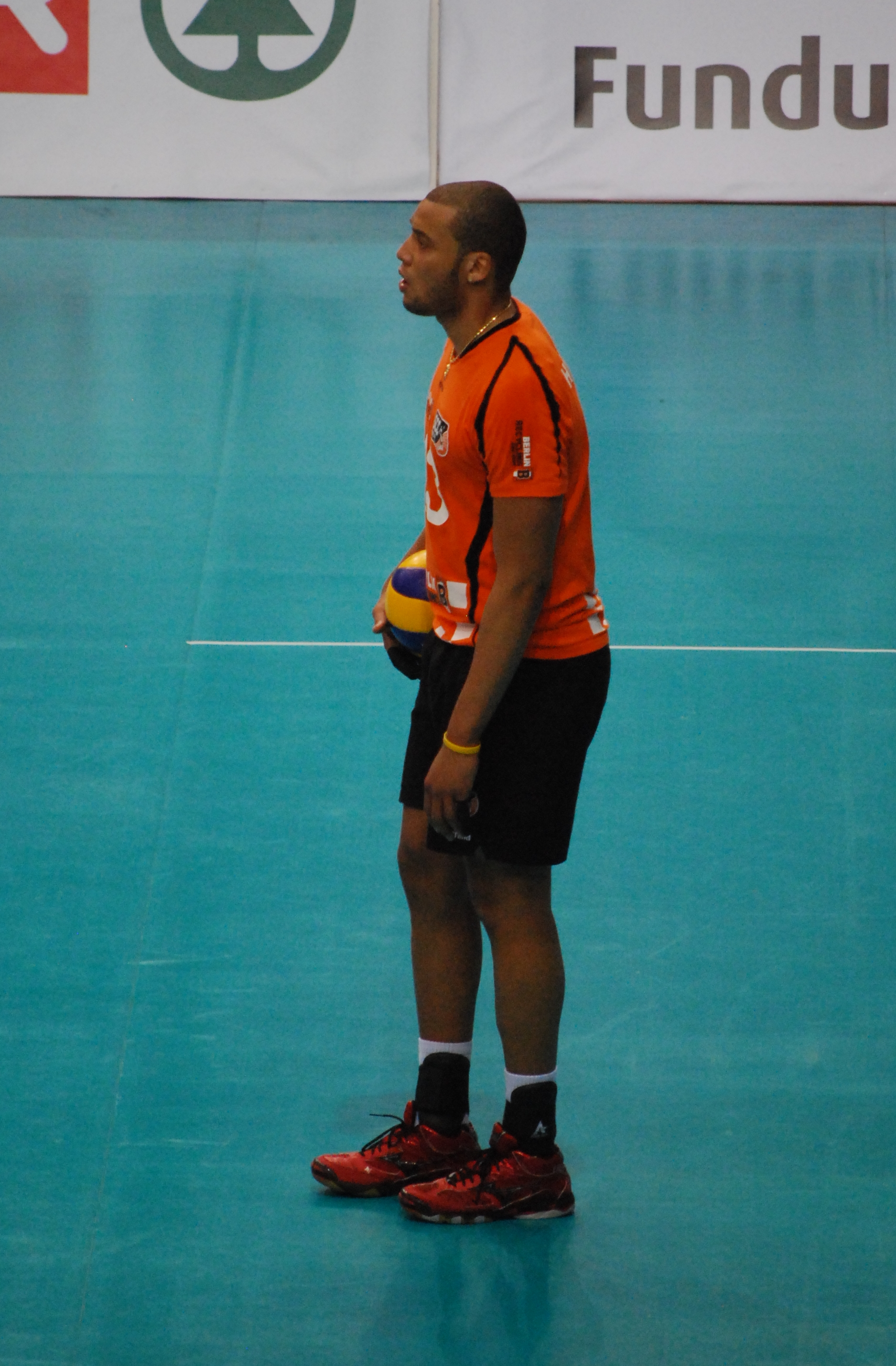

Personal information
- Full name: Salvador Hidalgo Oliva
- Nationality: Cuban; German
- Born: 27 December 1985 (age 40) Leningrad, USSR
- Height: 1.98 m (6 ft 6 in)
- Weight: 98 kg (216 lb)
- Spike: 355 cm (140 in)
- Block: 332 cm (131 in)

Volleyball information
- Position: Οutside spiker
- Current club: Maccabi Tel Aviv
- Number: 13

Career
- Years: Team
- 2007–2009 2009 2009–2010 2010 2010–2011 2011–2012 2012 2012–2013 2013–2014 2014–2016 2016 2016–2018 2018–2022 2022–2024 2024–2025 2025–: (Germany) Netzhoppers KW; Bouchierie Lebanon (Germany) Berlin RV; Al Arabi Qatar (Germany) Berlin RV (Turkey) Galatasaray Istanbul; Al Arabi Qatar (China) Beijing Baic Motor (Russia) Yugra Nizhnevartovsk; Al Rayan (China) Tianjin Volleyball (Poland) Jastrzębski Węgiel (Turkey) Fenerbahçe Istanbul (Greece) Olympiacos Piraeus (Turkey) Spor Toto (Israel) Maccabi Tel Aviv
- Updated on 24 January 2017

Salvador Hidalgo Oliva (born 27 December 1985) is a Cuban professional volleyball player, a member of Israeli Volleyball League club Maccabi Tel Aviv and plays as outside hitter.

He has won the Asian Championship in 2012 and the European trophy CEV Challenge Cup in 2023 and has been crowned Lebanon Champion, Chinese Champion, Qatar Champion, Turkish Champion and Greek Champion.

== Career ==
=== Clubs ===
Hidalgo Oliva grew up in Cuba and started playing volleyball here. In 2005 he left his home country and two years later played for the German Bundesliga club Netzhoppers Königs Wusterhausen. In 2009, he moved to league rivals Berlin RV, with whom he became German runner-up in 2011. In the same year, Hidalgo also received German citizenship. In the following years he played for various clubs around the world and won numerous titles.

From 2016 to 2018, Hidalgo Oliva played for the Polish first division club Jastrzębski Węgiel. He became main player of the team and in half of season he achieved 6 individual awards in regular round for Most Valuable Player of the match. In 2018 he moved to Turkey to Fenerbahçe Istanbul and won the national championship and cup double in his first season here.

== Style of Play ==
He has been named the top server of the year in the Asian Champions League in 2010 and 2012, as well as in the German, Polish and Turkish Championships where he won this award again. He has won the best scorer of the year award in the CEV Challenge Cup in 2010 and the Polish Championship in 2017.

== Sporting achievements ==
=== Clubs ===
- AVC Champions League
  - 2012 – with Al Arabi Qatar
  - 2010 – with Al Arabi Qatar (runner-up)
  - 2014 – with Al Rayan (runner-up)
- CEV Challenge Cup
  - 2022/2023 – with Olympiacos Piraeus
  - 2009/2010 – with Berlin RV (3rd place)
- FIVB Club World Championship
  - Brazil 2014 – with Al Rayyan (runner-up)
- National championships
  - 2008/2009 Lebanon Championship, with Bouchierie Lebanon
  - 2012/2013 Chinese Championship, with Beijing Baic Motor
  - 2013/2014 Russian Championship A, with Yugra Nizhnevartovsk
  - 2014/2015 GCC Championship, with Al Rayan
  - 2014/2015 Qatar Championship, with Al Rayan
  - 2015/2016 GCC Championship, with Al Rayan
  - 2018/2019 Turkish Championship, with Fenerbahçe
  - 2022/2023 Hellenic Championship, with Olympiacos
  - 2023/2024 Hellenic Championship, with Olympiacos
- National cups
  - 2014/2015 Qatar Cup, with Al Rayan
  - 2018/2019 Turkish Cup, with Fenerbahçe
  - 2020 Turkish Super Cup, with Fenerbahçe
  - 2023/2024 Hellenic Cup, with Olympiacos Piraeus

=== Individually ===
- 2010 CEV Challenge Cup – Best scorer
- 2010 AVC Champions League – Best server
- 2011 German Championship – Best server
- 2012 AVC Champions League – Best server
- 2012 AVC Champions League – Most valuable player
- 2013 Chinese Championship – Most valuable player
- 2013 Chinese Championship – Best outside spiker
- 2015 Qatar Championship – Most valuable player
- 2015 Qatar Championship – Best scorer
- 2015 Qatar Championship – Best server
- 2015 Qatar Championship – Best outside spiker
- 2017 Polish Championship – Best scorer
- 2017 Polish Championship – Best server
- 2017 Polish Championship – Best outside spiker
- 2019 Turkish Cup – Best outside spiker
- 2019 Turkish Cup – Most valuable player
- 2019 Turkish Championship – Most valuable player
- 2021 Turkish Super Cup – Most valuable player
- 2022 Turkish Championship – Best server
- 2023 Hellenic Championship – Best server
- 2023 Hellenic Championship – Best outside spiker
- 2024 Hellenic Championship – Best server
