= Juhkami =

Juhkami is a surname. Notable people with the surname include:

- Martti Juhkami (born 1988), Estonian volleyball player
- Mihkel Juhkami (born 1963), Estonian politician
