= 2011 Gulf Volleyball Clubs Champions Championship =

In 2011, the Gulf Volleyball Clubs Champions Championship comprised eight teams, divided into two groups.

== Pools composition ==
Pool A	Pool B
(Bahrain) Al-Muharraq SC (2rd) (Qatar) Al Arabi (4th) (Saudi Arabia) Al-Ahli Saudi FC (United Arab Emirates) Al Shabab (Dubai)	(Qatar) Al Rayyan (Host & 1st) (Oman) Saham (3rd) (Kuwait) Kazma SC (Saudi Arabia) Al-Hilal

== Preliminary round ==
=== Pool A ===
Pos	Team	Pld	W	L	Pts	SW	SL	SR	SPW	SPL	SPR
1	(Bahrain) Al-Muharraq SC	2	2	0	6	6	0	MAX	150	40	3.750
2	(Qatar) Al Arabi	2	1	1	3	3	3	1.000	115	75	1.533
3	(Saudi Arabia) Al-Ahli Saudi FC	2	0	2	0	0	6	0.000	0	150	0.000
4	(United Arab Emirates) Al Shabab (Dubai)	2	0	2	0	0	6	0.000	0	150	0.000

Source: kooora.com (Arabic)
