= Jan Štokr =

Czech volleyball player

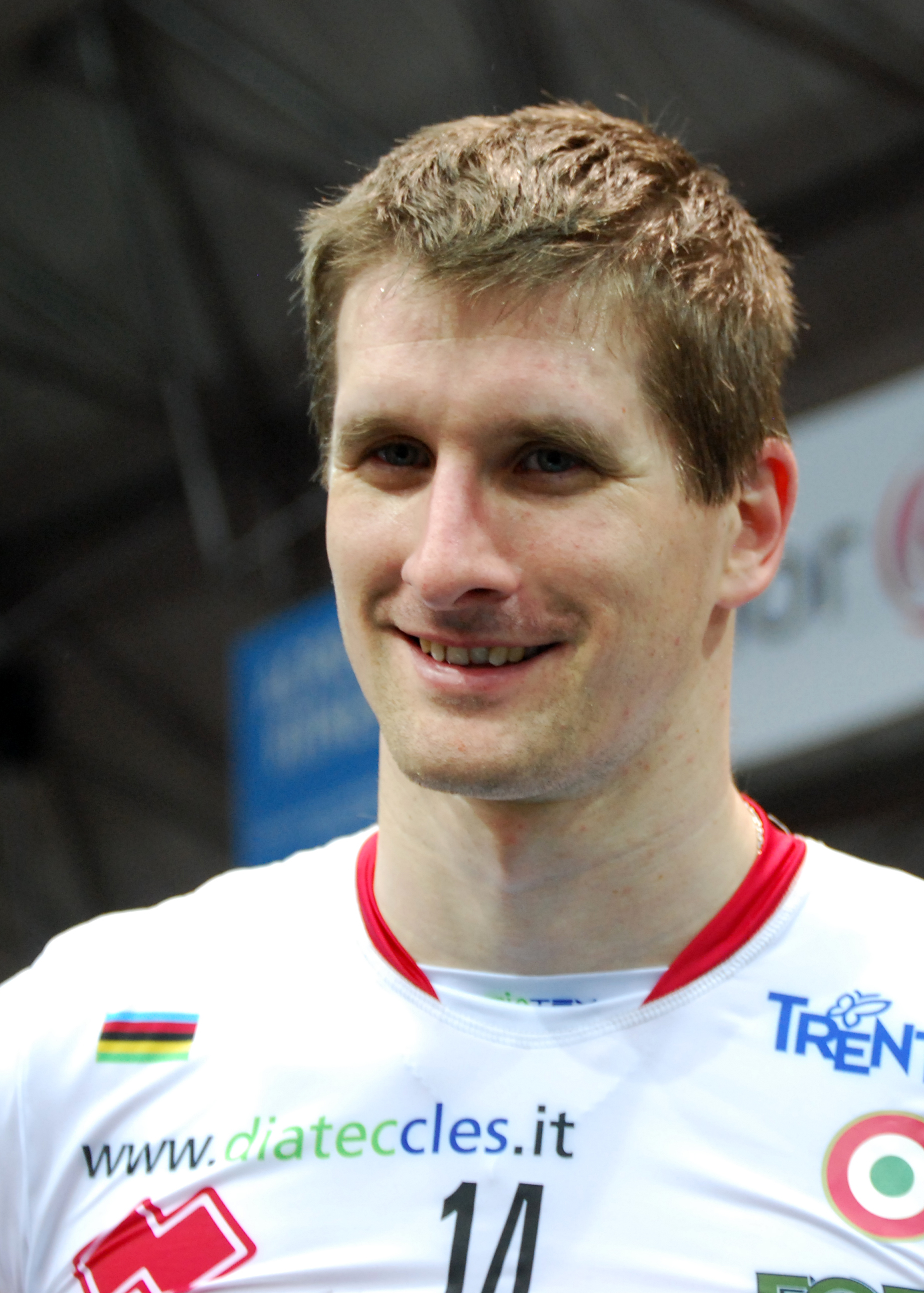
- Štokr with Trentino in 2013

Personal information
- Nationality: Czech
- Born: 16 January 1983 (age 43); Dačice, Czechoslovakia
- Height: 2.05 m (6 ft 9 in)
- Spike: 368 cm (145 in)
- Block: 341 cm (134 in)

Volleyball information
- Position: Opposite
- Current club: VK Dukla Liberec
- Number: 14

Career
Years	Teams
1997–1999; 1999–2000; 2000–2001; 2001–2004; 2004–2005; 2005–2006; 2006–2010; 2010–2013; 2013–2015; 2015-2015; 2015–2016; 2016–2017; 2017–	SK Telč; TJ Je Dukovany; USK Praga; Odolena Voda; Daytona Modena; Cagliari Volley; RPA-LuigiBacchi.it Perugia; Itas Diatec Trentino; Dynamo Krasnodar; Al Rayyan SC; Suwon KEPCO Vixtorm; Diatec Trentino; VK Dukla Liberec

National team
Czech Republic (136)
- Last updated: 16 May 2017

Jan Štokr (born 16 January 1983) is a Czech volleyball player (opposite), a member of Czech Republic men's national volleyball team and Czech club VK Dukla Liberec. He is a multiple winner of the Club World Championship with the Italian club Diatec Trentino.

== Career ==
=== Clubs ===
On 8 July 2010 Štokr signed a contract with Itas Diatec Trentino. In 2013 he went to Russian league, Dynamo Krasnodar. In 2016 he returned to Itas Diatec Trentino.

== Sporting achievements ==
=== CEV Champions League ===
- 2010/2011 - with Itas Diates Trentino
- 2011/2012 - with Itas Diates Trentino

=== FIVB Club World Championship ===
- Qatar 2010 - with Itas Diates Trentino
- Qatar 2011 - with Itas Diates Trentino
- Qatar 2012 - with Itas Diates Trentino

=== National championship ===
- 2003/2004 Czech Championship, with Odolena Voda
- 2003/2004 Czech Cup, with Odolena Voda
- 2010/2011 Italian Championship, with Itas Diates Trentino
- 2011/2012 Italian Cup Serie A, with Itas Diates Trentino
- 2011/2012 Italian Championship, with Itas Diates Trentino
- 2012/2013 Italian Cup Serie A, with Itas Diates Trentino
- 2012/2013 Italian Championship, with Itas Diates Trentino
- 2016/2017 Italian Championship, with Diatec Trentino

=== Individually ===
- 2011 Italian Championship - Most Valuable Player
- 2011 Italian SuperCup - Most Valuable Player
- 2012 The best volleyball player of Czech Republic
- 2012 FIVB Club World Championship - Best Spiker
- 2013 The best volleyball player of Czech Republic
- 2014 Emir of Qatar Cup - Most Valuable Player

Awards
Preceded by (Cuba) Osmany Juantorena	Best Spiker of FIVB Club World Championship; 2012	Succeeded by (Bulgaria) Tsvetan Sokolov
