= 2012 FIVB Volleyball Men's Club World Championship =

2012 Men's Club World Championship
Tournament details
- Host country: Qatar
- Dates: 13–19 October
- Teams: 8 (from 5 confederations)
- Venue: 1 (in 1 host city)

Final positions
- Champions: (Italy) Trentino Diatec (4th title)

Tournament awards
- MVP: (Italy) Osmany Juantorena (TRE)

The 2012 FIVB Volleyball Men's Club World Championship was the 8th edition of the event. It was held in Doha, Qatar from 13 to 19 October 2012.

== Qualification ==
Team (Confederation)	Qualified as
(Qatar) Al-Rayyan (AVC)	Hosts
(Egypt) Zamalek (CAVB)	2012 African Champions
(Qatar) Al-Arabi (AVC)	2012 Asian Champions
(Russia) Zenit Kazan (CEV)	2012 European Champions
(Mexico) Tigres de la UANL (NORCECA)	2012 NORCECA Representatives
(Brazil) Sada Cruzeiro (CSV)	2012 South American Champions
(Poland) PGE Skra Bełchatów (CEV)	Wild Card (2012 European Runners-up)
(Italy) Trentino Diatec (CEV)	Wild Card (2012 European 3rd place)

== Pools composition ==
Pool A	Pool B
(Italy) Trentino Diatec	(Russia) Zenit Kazan
(Brazil) Sada Cruzeiro	(Poland) PGE Skra Bełchatów
(Qatar) Al-Rayyan	(Egypt) Zamalek
(Mexico) Tigres de la UANL	(Qatar) Al-Arabi

== Venue ==
All matches
Doha, Qatar
Aspire Ladies Sports Hall
Capacity: 2,500

== Pool standing procedure ==
1. Match points
2. Number of matches won
3. Sets ratio
4. Points ratio
5. Result of the last match between the tied teams

Match won 3–0 or 3–1: 3 match points for the winner, 0 match points for the loser
Match won 3–2: 2 match points for the winner, 1 match point for the loser

== Preliminary round ==
- All times are Arabia Standard Time (UTC+03:00).

=== Pool A ===
Pos	Team	Pld	W	L	Pts	SW	SL	SR	SPW	SPL	SPR	Qualification
1	(Italy) Trentino Diatec	3	3	0	7	9	4	2.250	300	261	1.149	Semifinals
2	(Brazil) Sada Cruzeiro	3	2	1	7	8	4	2.000	290	246	1.179	Semifinals
3	(Qatar) Al-Rayyan	3	1	2	4	6	6	1.000	252	256	0.984	
4	(Mexico) Tigres de la UANL	3	0	3	0	0	9	0.000	146	225	0.649	

Date	Time		Score		Set 1	Set 2	Set 3	Set 4	Set 5	Total	Report
13 Oct	15:00	Sada Cruzeiro (Brazil)	3–0	(Mexico) Tigres de la UANL	25–17	25–13	25–18			75–48	P2 P3
13 Oct	19:00	Trentino Diatec (Italy)	3–2	(Qatar) Al-Rayyan	22–25	25–18	23–25	25–17	15–9	110–94	P2 P3
14 Oct	17:20	Trentino Diatec (Italy)	3–0	(Mexico) Tigres de la UANL	25–15	25–15	25–20			75–50	P2 P3
14 Oct	19:00	Sada Cruzeiro (Brazil)	3–1	(Qatar) Al-Rayyan	25–20	23–25	25–16	25–22		98–83	P2 P3
16 Oct	15:00	Trentino Diatec (Italy)	3–2	(Brazil) Sada Cruzeiro	25–23	24–26	26–24	19–25	21–19	115–117	P2 P3
16 Oct	20:05	Al-Rayyan (Qatar)	3–0	(Mexico) Tigres de la UANL	25–13	25–17	25–18			75–48	P2 P3

=== Pool B ===
Pos	Team	Pld	W	L	Pts	SW	SL	SR	SPW	SPL	SPR	Qualification
1	(Poland) PGE Skra Bełchatów	3	3	0	8	9	3	3.000	274	248	1.105	Semifinals
2	(Russia) Zenit Kazan	3	2	1	7	8	4	2.000	281	242	1.161	Semifinals
3	(Qatar) Al-Arabi	3	1	2	3	5	6	0.833	244	250	0.976	
4	(Egypt) Zamalek	3	0	3	0	0	9	0.000	171	230	0.743	

Date	Time		Score		Set 1	Set 2	Set 3	Set 4	Set 5	Total	Report
13 Oct	17:00	PGE Skra Bełchatów (Poland)	3–0	(Egypt) Zamalek	27–25	25–19	28–26			80–70	P2 P3
14 Oct	15:00	Al-Arabi (Qatar)	1–3	(Russia) Zenit Kazan	22–25	22–25	31–29	18–25		93–104	P2 P3
15 Oct	10:00	Al-Arabi (Qatar)	3–0	(Egypt) Zamalek	25–19	25–16	25–20			75–55	P2 P3
15 Oct	19:15	Zenit Kazan (Russia)	2–3	(Poland) PGE Skra Bełchatów	25–21	23–25	25–17	19–25	10–15	102–103	P2 P3
17 Oct	15:00	Zenit Kazan (Russia)	3–0	(Egypt) Zamalek	25–13	25–19	25–14			75–46	P2 P3
17 Oct	19:00	PGE Skra Bełchatów (Poland)	3–1	(Qatar) Al-Arabi	25–17	25–17	16–25	25–17		91–76	P2 P3

== Final round ==
- All times are Arabia Standard Time (UTC+03:00).

Semifinals
18 October
(Italy) Trentino	3
(Russia) Kazan	0
18 October
(Poland) Bełchatów	2
(Brazil) Sada	3

Final
19 October
(Italy) Trentino	3
(Brazil) Sada	0
3rd place match
19 October
(Russia) Kazan	2
(Poland) Bełchatów	3

=== Semifinals ===
Date	Time		Score		Set 1	Set 2	Set 3	Set 4	Set 5	Total	Report
18 Oct	15:00	Trentino Diatec (Italy)	3–0	(Russia) Zenit Kazan	25–14	25–20	25–14			75–48	P2 P3
18 Oct	19:00	PGE Skra Bełchatów (Poland)	2–3	(Brazil) Sada Cruzeiro	21–25	25–23	25–27	25–23	9–15	105–113	P2 P3

=== 3rd place match ===
Date	Time		Score		Set 1	Set 2	Set 3	Set 4	Set 5	Total	Report
19 Oct	15:00	Zenit Kazan (Russia)	2–3	(Poland) PGE Skra Bełchatów	18–25	25–18	25–15	24–26	11–15	103–99	P2 P3

=== Final ===
Date	Time		Score		Set 1	Set 2	Set 3	Set 4	Set 5	Total	Report
19 Oct	19:11	Trentino Diatec (Italy)	3–0	(Brazil) Sada Cruzeiro	25–18	25–15	29–27			79–60	P2 P3

== Final standing ==
Rank	Team
1st place, gold medalist(s)	(Italy) Trentino Diatec
2nd place, silver medalist(s)	(Brazil) Sada Cruzeiro
3rd place, bronze medalist(s)	(Poland) PGE Skra Bełchatów
4	(Russia) Zenit Kazan
5	(Qatar) Al-Arabi
5	(Qatar) Al-Rayyan
5	(Mexico) Tigres de la UANL
5	(Egypt) Zamalek

2012 Men's Club World Champions

4th title

14–man Roster
Matey Kaziyski (c), Giacomo Sintini, Emanuele Birarelli, Osmany Juantorena, Raphael Oliveira, Damiano Valsecchi, Nikolay Uchikov, Filippo Lanza, Mitar Tzourits, Massimo Colaci, Jan Štokr, Stefan Chrtiansky Jr., Andrea Bari, Matteo Burgsthaler
Head coach
Radostin Stoychev

== Awards ==
- Most valuable player
  (Italy) Osmany Juantorena (Trentino Diatec)
- Best scorer
  (Serbia) Aleksandar Atanasijević (PGE Skra Bełchatów)
- Best spiker
  (Czech Republic) Jan Štokr (Trentino Diatec)
- Best blocker
  (Italy) Emanuele Birarelli (Trentino Diatec)
- Best server
  (Brazil) Wallace de Souza (Sada Cruzeiro)
- Best setter
  (Brazil) William Arjona (Sada Cruzeiro)
- Best receiver
  (Brazil) Sérgio Nogueira (Sada Cruzeiro)
- Best libero
  (Brazil) Sérgio Nogueira (Sada Cruzeiro)
