= Qatari Volleyball League =

- Sport: Volleyball
- Founded: 1979
- No. of teams: 10
- Country: Qatar
- Most recent champion: Al Arabi
- Most titles: Al Arabi (26 titles)
- Broadcaster: Al Kass
- Website: QVA

The Qatari Volleyball League (QVL) is a professional volleyball league in Qatar at the top of the Qatari volleyball league system. It was founded in 1979.

== Teams ==
=== 2020–21 ===
- Al Ahli S.C.
- Al Arabi S.C.
- Al Gharafa S.C.
- Al Khor S.C.
- Al Rayyan S.C.
- Al Sadd S.C.
- Al Shamal S.C.
- Police S.C.
- Qatar S.C.
- Al Wakra

== Champions ==
| Season | Champion | Runner-up | Third place |
|---|---|---|---|
| 1979–80 | Al Arabi | Al Rayyan | Qatar SC |
| 1980–81 | Al Arabi | Al Rayyan | Al Ahli SC |
| 1981–82 | Al Arabi | Qatar SC | Al Rayyan |
| 1982–83 | Al Arabi | Qatar SC | Mesaimeer |
| 1983–84 | Al Arabi | Al Ahli SC | Qatar SC |
| 1984–85 | Al Arabi | Al Sadd | Al Rayyan |
| 1985–86 | Al Arabi | Al Sadd | Al Rayyan |
| 1986–87 | Al Arabi | Al Rayyan | Al Sadd |
| 1987–88 | Al Arabi | Al Sadd | Al Ahli SC |
| 1988–89 | Al Arabi | Al Rayyan | Al Ahli SC |
| 1989–90 | Al Arabi | Al Rayyan | Al Sadd |
| 1990–91 | Al Arabi | Al Rayyan | Al Ahli SC |
| 1991–92 | Al Arabi | Al Ahli SC | Al Rayyan |
| 1992–93 | Al Rayyan | Al Arabi | Al Sadd |
| 1993–94 | Al Arabi | Al Rayyan | Qatar SC |
| 1994–95 | Al Rayyan | Al Arabi | Al Ahli SC |
| 1995–96 | Al Arabi | Al Rayyan | Al Ahli SC |
| 1996–97 | Al Arabi | Qatar SC | Al Rayyan |
| 1997–98 | Al Rayyan | Qatar SC | Al Ahli SC |
| 1998–99 | Qatar SC | Al Arabi | Al Rayyan |
| 1999–2000 | Qatar SC | Al Arabi | Al Rayyan |
| 2000–2001 | Al Rayyan | Al Arabi | Qatar SC |
| 2001–2002 | Qatar SC | Al Sadd | Al Arabi |
| 2002–2003 | Al Arabi | Qatar SC | Al Rayyan |
| 2003–2004 | Al Arabi | Qatar SC | Al Rayyan |
| 2004–2005 | Qatar SC | Al Arabi | Al Rayyan |
| 2005–2006 | Al Arabi | Qatar SC | Al Rayyan |
| 2006–2007 | Al Rayyan | Al Arabi | Al Ahli SC |
| 2007–2008 | Al Arabi | Al Rayyan | Police SC |
| 2008–2009 | Al Arabi | Qatar SC | Al Rayyan |
| 2009–2010 | Al Arabi | Al Rayyan | Police SC |
| 2010–2011 | Al Arabi | Police SC | Al Rayyan |
| 2011–2012 | Al Arabi | Al Rayyan | Al Ahli SC |
| 2012–2013 | Al Rayyan | Al Ahli SC | Al Arabi |
| 2013–2014 | Al Rayyan | Police SC | El Jaish |
| 2014–2015 | Al Rayyan | Al Arabi | El Jaish |
| 2015–2016 | Al Arabi | Al Rayyan | Police SC |
| 2016–2017 | Police SC | El Jaish | Al Arabi |
| 2017–2018 | Al Rayyan | Police SC | Al Arabi |
| 2018–2019 | Police SC | Al Rayyan | Al Arabi |
| 2019–2020 | Police SC | Al Arabi | Al Rayyan |
| 2020–2021 | Police SC | Al Ahli SC | Qatar SC |
| 2021–2022 | Al Rayyan | Police SC | Al-Wakrah SC |
| 2022–2023 | Al Rayyan | Al Arabi | Police SC |
| 2023–2024 | Al Arabi | Al Rayyan | Qatar SC |
| 2024–2025 | Al Rayyan | Al-Wakrah SC | Police SC |
