= Qatar Super Cup =

Qatar Super Cup (volleyball)
- Founded: 2014; 11 years ago
- Country: Qatar
- Number of clubs: 2
- Current champions: Al-Arabi (2016)
- Most championships: Al Arabi (3)

The Super Cup has been launched by the Qatar Volleyball Association between the winners of the League and the Emir Cup of the past season.

Season	Champion	Runner-up
2014–2015	Al Arabi	Al Rayyan
2015–2016	Al Arabi	Al Rayyan
2016–2017	Al Arabi	Al Rayyan
