= Police Sports Club =

Police Sports Club may refer to:

- Al-Shorta SC (Iraq)
- Al-Shorta SC (Syria)
- Police SC Qatar – professional Volleyball team (Doha, Qatar)
- Sri Lanka Police Sports Club (cricket)
- Sri Lanka Police Sports Club (football)
- Sri Lanka Police Sports Club (rugby)
