= Tartu Volleyball =

Estonian volleyball club

BIGBANK Tartu
- Full name: BIGBANK Tartu
- Founded: 1999
- Ground: University of Tartu Sports Hall, Tartu (Capacity: 1,650)
- Chairman: Alari Jõesaar
- Manager: (Estonia) Alar Rikberg
- Captain: (Estonia) Martti Juhkami
- League: Baltic Men Volleyball League; Estonian Volleyball League
- 2024–25: 1st (Baltic League); 1st (Estonian League); 2nd (Estonian Cup)
- Website: Club home page
- Championships: 6 Baltic Championships; 6 Estonian Championships; 6 Estonian Cups

BIGBANK Tartu is an Estonian professional volleyball club based in Tartu, Estonia, that competes in the Baltic Men Volleyball League.

Founded in 1999, the team has won 6 Baltic League championships, 6 Estonian League championships and 6 Estonian Cups.

The team plays its home games at University of Tartu Sports Hall.

== History ==
The team was founded 1999 as Pere Leib Tartu. Before that Tartu volleyball was represented by Ösel Foods Tartu, who had won the Estonian League in 1998 and 1999. Pere Leib Tartu was founded by two former Ösel Foods players, Raivo Simson and Alari Jõesaar.

Pere Leib Tartu won another Estonian League title in 2006, defeating Selver/Audentes 2–0 in the finals. The team won their first Estonian Cup in the same season. Pere Leib Tartu won another Estonian Cup in 2008–09.

The 2006–07 season was historical as Pere Leib Tartu made their European debut when they held the CEV Top Teams Cup tournament.

In 2011–12, the club won second Estonian League title and also their first ever Baltic League title by defeating the defending champions Selver Tallinn in the finals. In 2012, the team changed their name to BIGBANK Tartu for sponsorship reasons. First title under the new name came in 2014, when the club won their third Estonian League championship.

In 2014–15, BIGBANK Tartu won their second Baltic League title.

== Team roster ==
=== 2023/2024 ===
Head coach:	(Estonia) Alar Rikberg
Assistant:	(Estonia) Andrei Ojamets
Manager:	(Estonia) Hendrik Rikand

No.	Name	Date of birth	Position
1	(Estonia) Siim Päid	June 2, 1989 (age 37)	middle blocker
3	(Estonia) Taavet Leppik	July 31, 1993 (age 32)	libero
6	(Estonia) Martti Juhkami (C)	June 6, 1988 (age 38)	outside hitter
7	(Estonia) Romi Aros	April 11, 2001 (age 25)	libero
8	(Estonia) Timo Lõhmus	May 30, 2001 (age 25)	outside hitter
11	(Estonia) Aleksander Eerma	August 3, 1995 (age 30)	setter
12	(Estonia) Kristjan Unt	July 9, 2005 (age 20)	outside hitter
13	(Estonia) Andris Vahula	August 3, 2005 (age 20)	setter
14	(Latvia) Andris Širjakovs	October 12, 2000 (age 25)	opposite
19	(Estonia) Robin Rohula	December 19, 2006 (age 19)	outside hitter
20	(Estonia) Tamur Viidalepp	November 12, 1997 (age 28)	outside hitter
21	(Estonia) Hergo Hansman	February 18, 2000 (age 26)	opposite
22	(Estonia) Ron Rudolf Teesaar	September 23, 2005 (age 20)	middle blocker
31	(United States) Anthony Daniel Matheney	May 12, 2000 (age 26)	middle blocker
99	(Estonia) Mart Naaber	December 15, 1992 (age 33)	middle blocker

Team roster – season 2022/2023
No.	Name	Date of birth	Position
1	(Estonia) Rait Rikberg (C)	August 30, 1982 (age 43)	libero
2	(Czech Republic) Matej Šmidl	February 25, 1997 (age 29)	opposite
3	(Estonia) Taavet Leppik	July 31, 1993 (age 32)	outside hitter
6	(Estonia) Siim Päid	June 2, 1989 (age 37)	middle blocker
7	(Estonia) Kevin Soo	December 3, 1993 (age 32)	middle blocker
8	(Estonia) Timo Lõhmus	May 30, 2001 (age 25)	outside hitter
10	(Estonia) Martin Tamm	June 12, 2004 (age 22)	outside hitter
12	(Estonia) Kristjan Unt	July 9, 2005 (age 20)	outside hitter
13	(Estonia) Ronald Järv	May 10, 1993 (age 33)	setter
20	(Estonia) Tamur Viidalepp	November 12, 1997 (age 28)	outside hitter
22	(Estonia) Markkus Keel	August 18, 1995 (age 30)	setter
25	(Estonia) Markus Tamm	June 12, 2004 (age 22)	outside hitter
99	(Estonia) Mart Naaber	December 15, 1992 (age 33)	middle blocker
Head coach: (Estonia) Alar Rikberg; Assistant: (Estonia) Mikk Kesküla; Assistant: (Estonia) Hendrik Rikand

Team roster – season 2021/2022
No.	Name	Date of birth	Position
1	(Estonia) Rait Rikberg	August 30, 1982	libero
3	(Estonia) Taavet Leppik	July 31, 1993	outside hitter
5	(Estonia) Kert Toobal (C)	June 3, 1979	setter
6	(Estonia) Martti Juhkami	June 6, 1988	outside hitter
7	(Estonia) Kevin Soo	December 3, 1993	middle blocker
9	(Estonia) Hergo Hansman	February 18, 2000	opposite
11	(Estonia) Siim Tammearu	June 13, 1999	outside hitter
12	(Estonia) Albert Hurt	April 22, 1999	outside hitter
13	(Estonia) Ronald Järv	May 10, 1993	setter
17	(Estonia) Allar Keskülla	April 1, 2001	libero
18	(Estonia) Alex Saaremaa	December 18, 2000	middle blocker
20	(Estonia) Tamur Viidalepp	November 12, 1997	outside hitter
33	(Estonia) Valentin Kordas	December 31, 1998	opposite
66	(Estonia) Siim Päid	June 2, 1989	middle blocker
99	(Estonia) Mart Naaber	December 15, 1992	middle blocker
Head coach: (Estonia) Alar Rikberg; Assistant: (Estonia) Oliver Lüütsepp; Assistant: (Estonia) Hendrik Rikand

Team roster – season 2020/2021
No.	Name	Date of birth	Position
1	(Estonia) Rait Rikberg	August 30, 1982	libero
3	(Estonia) Sander Lepp	September 23, 2001	libero
4	(Estonia) Märt Tammearu	March 17, 2001	outside hitter
5	(Estonia) Kert Toobal (C)	June 3, 1979	setter
6	(Estonia) Siim Päid	June 2, 1989	middle blocker
7	(Estonia) Kevin Soo	December 3, 1993	middle blocker
9	(Estonia) Hergo Hansman	February 18, 2000	outside hitter
10	(Estonia) Stefan Kaibald	May 19, 1997	outside hitter
11	(Estonia) Siim Tammearu	June 13, 1999	outside hitter
12	(Estonia) Albert Hurt	April 22, 1999	outside hitter
13	(Estonia) Ronald Järv	May 10, 1993	setter
17	(Estonia) Alex Saaremaa	December 18, 2000	middle blocker
18	(Estonia) Siim Põlluäär	May 30, 1989	opposite
24	(Estonia) Kristo Karp	February 11, 1997	middle blocker
Head coach: (Estonia) Alar Rikberg; Assistant: (Estonia) Argo Meresaar; Assistant: (Estonia) Hendrik Rikand

Team roster – season 2019/2020
No.	Name	Date of birth	Position
1	(Estonia) Rait Rikberg	August 30, 1982	libero
2	(Estonia) Albert Hurt	April 22, 1999	outside hitter
3	(Estonia) Mihkel Tanila	September 30, 1991	middle blocker
5	(Estonia) Kert Toobal (C)	June 3, 1979	setter
7	(Estonia) Kevin Soo	December 3, 1993	middle blocker
8	(Estonia) Märt Tammearu	March 17, 2001	outside hitter
9	(Estonia) Hergo Hansman	February 18, 2000	outside hitter
10	(Estonia) Stefan Kaibald	May 19, 1997	outside hitter
11	(Estonia) Siim Tammearu	June 13, 1999	outside hitter
12	(Australia) Curtis Stockton	April 22, 1993	opposite
13	(Estonia) Ronald Järv	May 10, 1993	setter
18	(Estonia) Alex Saaremaa	December 18, 2000	middle blocker
19	(Estonia) Johann Olaf Lääne	February 14, 1994	outside hitter
20	(Estonia) Rauno Kink	January 6, 1996	middle blocker
21	(Estonia) Maksim Sevtsenko	March 9, 1996	setter
Head coach: (Estonia) Andrei Ojamets; Assistant: (Estonia) Argo Meresaar; Assistant: (Estonia) Hendrik Rikand; Assistant: (Estonia) Alar Rikberg

== Season by season ==
Season	Estonian League	Estonian Cup	Baltic League	European competitions
1999–00	Runner-up	Runner-up	–	–
2000–01	Runner-up	Runner-up	–	–
2001–02	Runner-up	Runner-up	–	–
2002–03	Runner-up	Runner-up	–	–
2003–04	3rd place	Runner-up	–	–
2004–05	Runner-up	Semifinalist	–	–
2005–06	Champion	Champion	Runner-up	–
2006–07	Runner-up	Runner-up	5th place	2 CEV Top Teams Cup Round I
2007–08	Runner-up	Runner-up	Runner-up	–
2008–09	Runner-up	Champion	Runner-up	–
2009–10	3rd place	Semifinalist	Runner-up	–
2010–11	Runner-up	Semifinalist	4th place	–
2011–12	Champion	Runner-up	Champion	–
2012–13	4th place	Semifinalist	6th place	–
2013–14	Champion	Runner-up	Runner-up	–
2014–15	Runner-up	Semifinalist	Champion	3 CEV Challenge Cup 1/16 Finals
2015–16	Quarterfinalist	Semifinalist	8th place	–
2016–17	Runner-up	Semifinalist	3rd place	–
2017–18	Runner-up	Runner-up	5th place	–
2018–19	Runner-up	Semifinalist	Champion	–
2019–20	cancelled	Champion	cancelled	–
2020–21	Champion	Runner-up	4th place	–
2021–22	Champion	Champion	Champion	2 CEV Cup 1/32 Finals
2022–23	Runner-up	Champion	Champion	3 CEV Challenge Cup 1/8 Finals
2023–24	4th place	Champion	Runner-up	–
2024–25	Champion	Runner-up	Champion	3 CEV Challenge Cup 1/16 Finals

== Honours ==
Baltic League

- Winners (6): 2012, 2015, 2019, 2022, 2023, 2025
- Runners-up: 2006, 2008, 2009, 2010, 2014, 2024

Estonian League

- Winners (6): 2006, 2012, 2014, 2021, 2022, 2025
- Runners-up: 2000, 2001, 2002, 2003, 2005, 2007, 2008, 2009, 2011, 2015, 2017, 2018, 2019, 2023

Baltic Cup

- Winners (2): 2003, 2004
- Runners-up: 2006

Estonian Cup

- Winners (6): 2005, 2008, 2019, 2021, 2022, 2023
- Runners-up: 1999, 2000, 2001, 2002, 2003, 2006, 2007, 2011, 2013, 2017, 2020, 2024

== Head coaches ==
- 1999–2001 (Estonia) Andres Toode
- 2001–2005 (Estonia) Alar Kaljuvee
- 2005–2008 (Estonia) Urmas Tali
- 2008–2009 (Estonia) Oliver Taats
- 2009–2012 (Estonia) Rainer Vassiljev
- 2012–2015 (Estonia) Andrei Ojamets
- 2015–2018 (Estonia) Oliver Lüütsepp
- 2018–2020 (Estonia) Andrei Ojamets
- 2020– (Estonia) Alar Rikberg

== Notable players ==
- (Estonia) Martti Juhkami (6 seasons: 2009–2012; 2021–2022; 2023–)
- (Estonia) Kristo Kollo (7 seasons: 2007–2012; 2013–2015)
- (Estonia) Argo Meresaar (4 seasons: 2005–2007; 2013–2015)
- (Estonia) Jaanus Nõmmsalu (1 season: 2007–2008)
- (Estonia) Hindrek Pulk (1 season: 2018–2019)
- (Estonia) Rait Rikberg (22 seasons: 2001–2023)
- (Estonia) Janis Sirelpuu (3 seasons: 2000–2003)
- (Estonia) Rauno Tamme (2 seasons: 2009–2011)
- (Estonia) Renee Teppan (2 seasons: 2012–2014)
- (Estonia) Andres Toobal (4 seasons: 2009–2011; 2012–2014)
- (Estonia) Kert Toobal (4 seasons: 2008–2009; 2019–2022)
- (Estonia) Henri Treial (4 seasons: 2012–2016)
- (Estonia) Robert Täht (3 seasons: 2012–2015)
- (Estonia) Oliver Venno (3 seasons: 2006–2009)
