= 2008 Gulf Volleyball Clubs Champions Championship =

In 2008 the Gulf Volleyball Clubs Champions Championship was won by the Al-Qadsia team.

== League standings ==
Pos	Club	P	W	L	GF	GA	Pts
1	Al-Qadsia	5	4	1	12	6	9
2	Al-Nasr Dubai SC	5	4	1	13	6	9
3	Al-Hilal FC	5	4	1	14	7	9
4	Al-Nasr SC (Bahrain)	5	2	3	8	11	7
5	Al Rayyan	5	1	4	6	12	6
6	Sohar	5	0	5	5	15	5
