= Henri Treial =

Estonian volleyball player (born 1992)

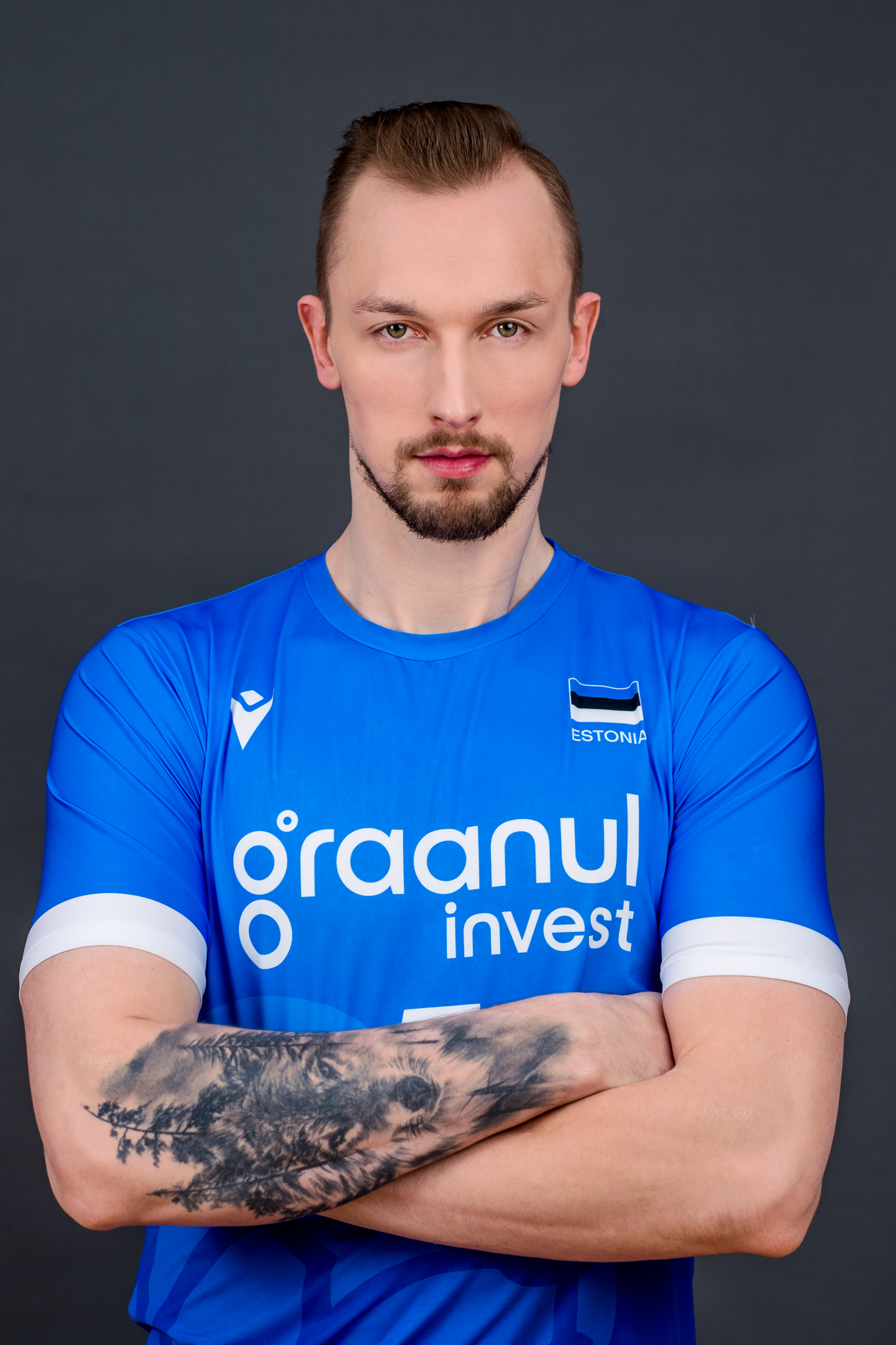
- Treial in 2022

Personal information
- Nationality: Estonian
- Born: 28 May 1992 (age 34); Võru, Estonia
- Height: 2.04 m (6 ft 8 in)
- Weight: 96 kg (212 lb)
- Spike: 345 cm (136 in)
- Block: 322 cm (127 in)

Volleyball information
- Position: Middle blocker
- Current club: Knack Roeselare
- Number: 11

Career
Years	Teams
2008–2012; 2012–2016; 2016–2018; 2018–2019; 2019–2020; 2020–2021; 2021–2023; 2023–	(Estonia) Valio Võru (Estonia) Bigbank Tartu (Czech Republic) ČEZ Karlovarsko (Italy) VBC Mondovì (Estonia) Saaremaa (France) Saint-Nazaire Volley-Ball (Belgium) Greenyard Maaseik (Belgium) Knack Roeselare

National team
2015–	Estonia
Honours
Men's volleyball
Representing Estonia
Challenger Cup
Bronze medal – third place	2018 Portugal

Henri Treial (born 28 May 1992) is an Estonian volleyball player, a member of the Estonia men's national volleyball team and Belgian club Knack Roeselare.

== Club career ==
Treial was born in Võru, and started his career in hometown club Valio Võru at the age of 16. After four seasons he moved to Bigbank Tartu and won the Estonian Championship in 2014 and the Baltic League title in 2015. He then moved to abroad and signed with Czech team ČEZ Karlovarsko. With the team he won the Czech Championship in 2018. Treial spent the 2018–19 season in Italy playing for VBC Mondovì alongside compatriot Kristo Kollo. Treial spent the next season in native Estonia and played for Saaremaa. He spent the 2020–21 season in France playing for Saint-Nazaire Volley-Ball and then signed with Belgian top team Greenyard Maaseik. After two seasons with Maaseik Treial moved to another Belgian powerhouse Knack Roeselare.

== Estonian national team ==
As a member of the senior Estonia men's national volleyball team, Treial competed at the 2015 Men's European Volleyball League, finishing in 4th place and at the 2015 Men's European Volleyball Championship, finishing in 11th place. He also represented his country at the 2017 Men's European Volleyball Championship.

== Sporting achievements ==
=== Clubs ===
Baltic League

- 2013/2014 – with Bigbank Tartu
- 2014/2015 – with Bigbank Tartu

National championship

- 2013/2014 Estonian Championship, with Bigbank Tartu
- 2014/2015 Estonian Championship, with Bigbank Tartu
- 2017/2018 Czech Championship, with ČEZ Karlovarsko
- 2021/2022 Belgian Championship, with Greenyard Maaseik
- 2022/2023 Belgian Championship, with Greenyard Maaseik
- 2023/2024 Belgian Championship, with Knack Roeselare

National cup

- 2013/2014 Estonian Cup 2013, with Bigbank Tartu
- 2016/2017 Czech Cup 2017, with ČEZ Karlovarsko
- 2017/2018 Czech Cup 2018, with ČEZ Karlovarsko
- 2019/2020 Estonian Cup 2019, with Saaremaa

=== National team ===
- 2018 Challenger Cup

=== Individual ===
- 2015 Baltic League – Best Blocker
