= Qatar Volleyball league 2015–2016 =

== League standings ==
- The first four teams Qualify to Qatar Cup.

Pos	Club	P	W	L	GF	GA	Pts
1	Al-Arabi	20	19	1	56	12	54
2	Al Rayyan	20	15	5	51	23	46
3	Police	20	15	5	51	25	45
4	Al-Jaish	20	14	6	49	24	45
5	Al-Ahli (Doha)	20	14	6	46	28	41
6	Al-shammal	20	11	9	37	31	32
7	Qatar SC	20	7	13	31	46	22
8	Al Khor	20	6	14	27	48	17
9	Al-Gharaffa	20	5	15	21	52	13
10	Al-Sadd	20	3	17	20	53	11
11	Al-Wakra	20	1	19	7	57	4
