= Argo Meresaar =

Estonian volleyball player

Personal information
- Full name: Argo Meresaar
- Nationality: Estonian
- Born: 13 January 1980 (age 46); Pärnu, Estonia
- Height: 2.06 m (6 ft 9 in)
- Weight: 104 kg (229 lb)
- Spike: 361 cm (142 in)
- Block: 340 cm (134 in)

Coaching information
- Current team: Bigbank Tartu
Previous teams coached
Years	Teams
2015–present	Bigbank Tartu (asst.)

Volleyball information
- Position: Opposite
- Number: 5

Career
Years	Teams
1996–2004; 2004–2005; 2005–2007; 2007–2008; 2008–2013; 2013–2015	(Estonia) ESS Falck Pärnu (Russia) Neftyanik Yaroslavl (Estonia) Pere Leib Tartu (Estonia) Pärnu (Estonia) Selver Tallinn (Estonia) Bigbank Tartu

National team
2000–2013	Estonia (175 games)
- Last updated: 28 April 2020

Argo Meresaar (born 13 January 1980 in Pärnu) is a former Estonian volleyball player who is currently the assistant coach of Bigbank Tartu.

== Career ==
He was a member of the Estonian national team from 2000 to 2013. Meresaar started his career in hometown club ESS Falck Pärnu. During his career, Meresaar has also played in Estonian teams Pere Leib Tartu and Selver Tallinn. He has spent one season in Russia playing for Neftyanik Yaroslavl. He represented Estonia at the 2009 and 2011 European Volleyball Championships. To date he is one of the most experienced players for the national team with 175 games to his name. Meresaar has been voted Estonian Volleyball Player of the Year five times (2000–2003 and 2009).

== Sporting achievements ==
=== Clubs ===
Baltic League

- 2005/2006 – with Pere Leib Tartu
- 2008/2009 – with Selver Tallinn
- 2009/2010 – with Selver Tallinn
- 2010/2011 – with Selver Tallinn
- 2011/2012 – with Selver Tallinn
- 2013/2014 – with Bigbank Tartu
- 2014/2015 – with Bigbank Tartu

National championship

- 1996/1997 Estonian Championship, with Pärnu
- 1998/1999 Estonian Championship, with ESS Pärnu
- 1999/2000 Estonian Championship, with ESS Pärnu
- 2000/2001 Estonian Championship, with ESS Pärnu
- 2001/2002 Estonian Championship, with ESS Pärnu
- 2002/2003 Estonian Championship, with ESS Pärnu
- 2003/2004 Estonian Championship, with ESS Falck Pärnu
- 2005/2006 Estonian Championship, with Pere Leib Tartu
- 2006/2007 Estonian Championship, with Pere Leib Tartu
- 2007/2008 Estonian Championship, with Pärnu
- 2008/2009 Estonian Championship, with Selver Tallinn
- 2009/2010 Estonian Championship, with Selver Tallinn
- 2010/2011 Estonian Championship, with Selver Tallinn
- 2011/2012 Estonian Championship, with Selver Tallinn
- 2012/2013 Estonian Championship, with Selver Tallinn
- 2013/2014 Estonian Championship, with Bigbank Tartu
- 2014/2015 Estonian Championship, with Bigbank Tartu

National cup

- 1998/1999 Estonian Cup 1998, with ESS Pärnu
- 1999/2000 Estonian Cup 1999, with ESS Pärnu
- 2000/2001 Estonian Cup 2000, with ESS Pärnu
- 2001/2002 Estonian Cup 2001, with ESS Pärnu
- 2002/2003 Estonian Cup 2002, with ESS Pärnu
- 2003/2004 Estonian Cup 2003, with ESS Falck Pärnu
- 2005/2006 Estonian Cup 2004, with Pere Leib Tartu
- 2006/2007 Estonian Cup 2006, with Pere Leib Tartu
- 2008/2009 Estonian Cup 2008, with Selver Tallinn
- 2009/2010 Estonian Cup 2009, with Selver Tallinn
- 2010/2011 Estonian Cup 2010, with Selver Tallinn
- 2011/2012 Estonian Cup 2011, with Selver Tallinn
- 2012/2013 Estonian Cup 2012, with Selver Tallinn
- 2013/2014 Estonian Cup 2013, with Bigbank Tartu

=== Individual ===
- 2000 Estonian Volleyball Player of the Year
- 2001 Estonian Volleyball Player of the Year
- 2002 Estonian Volleyball Player of the Year
- 2003 Estonian Volleyball Player of the Year
- 2009 Estonian Volleyball Player of the Year
- 2010 Baltic League – Best opposite hitter
