= Alar Kaljuvee =

Estonian volleyball coach (born 1961)

Alar Kaljuvee (born 9 April 1961) is an Estonian volleyball coach and sport pedagogue.

Kaljuvee was born in Misso, Võru County. In 1983 he graduated from University of Tartu's Institute of Physical Education. From 1973 to 1983, he practiced volleyball, coached by Taavo Veski ja Henno Linn. Since 1983, he has worked as a volleyball coach. He has been the head coach of volleyball club Tartu Pro Sport (Estonian champion in 1996). In the 2000s, he was the head coach of Tartu Pere Leib (won medals in Estonian championships). In 1996, the Estonian Volleyball Federation named him Best Women's Coach of the Year, and 2002 from to 2004, Best Men's Coach of the Year.
