= Andrei Ojamets =

Estonian volleyball player and coach

Andrei Ojamets (born 6 July 1963) is an Estonian volleyball player and coach.

He was born in Pärnu. In 1984 he graduated from Lesgaft National State University of Physical Education, Sport and Health.

He started his volleyball exercising in 1976, coached by Helju Suti and Johannes Noormäe.

He started coaching in 1986. 1991–2012 he was a coach for Pärnu Võrkpalliklubi. 2012–2015 and 2018–2020 he was the head coach of the club Bigbank Tartu. 2016–2018 he was the head coach of TÜ/Eeden women's team. 2017–2019 he was the head coach of Estonia women's national volleyball team.

Awards:

- 2019 Best Coach of Tartu
- 2019 state sport prize
