= 2005 Gulf Volleyball Clubs Champions Championship =

The Gulf Volleyball Clubs Champions Championship for 2005 was won by Al-Muharraq SC.

== League standings ==
Pos	Club	P	W	L	GF	GA	Pts
1	Qatar SC	5	4	1	14	7	9
2	Al-Muharraq	5	4	1	13	8	8
3	Al-Nasr Dubai SC	5	3	2	12	12	7
4	Al-Hilal	5	3	2	11	8	6
5	Sohar	5	0	5	9	15	4
6	Al-Arabi SC (Kuwait)	5	1	4	5	14	3

Source: koora.com (Arabic)

Qatar SC and Al-Muharraq SC played an extra final match, which Al-Muharraq SC won 3-1 to take the championship.
