= 2007 Gulf Volleyball Clubs Champions Championship =

In 2007 the Gulf Volleyball Clubs Champions Championship was won by the Al-Hilal FC team.

== League standings ==
Pos	Club	P	W	L	GF	GA	Pts
1	Al-Hilal	5	5	0	15	4	10
2	Al Arabi	5	3	2	12	9	8
3	Al-Muharraq SC	5	3	2	10	10	8
4	Al-Qadsia	5	3	2	10	10	8
5	Al-Nasr Dubai SC	5	1	4	8	12	6
6	Sohar	5	0	5	5	15	5

Source: kooora.com (Arabic)
