= Rait Rikberg =

Estonian volleyball player (born 1982)

Personal information
- Nationality: Estonian
- Born: 30 August 1982 (age 44); Tartu, then part of Estonian SSR, Soviet Union
- Height: 1.74 m (5 ft 9 in)
- Weight: 79 kg (174 lb)
- Spike: 307 cm (121 in)
- Block: 290 cm (114 in)

Volleyball information
- Position: Libero
- Current club: Bigbank Tartu

Career
Years	Teams
2002–2017; 2017; 2018–	(Estonia) Bigbank Tartu (Belgium) Prefaxis Menen (Estonia) Bigbank Tartu

National team
2007–2019	Estonia (174 games)
Honours
Men's volleyball
Representing Estonia
Men's European Volleyball League
Gold medal – first place	2016 Bulgaria
Gold medal – first place	2018 Czech Republic
Challenger Cup
Bronze medal – third place	2018 Portugal
- Last updated: 8 January 2020

Rait Rikberg (born 30 August 1982) is an Estonian volleyball player, who plays for his hometown club Bigbank Tartu.

== Estonian national team ==
As a member of the senior Estonia men's national volleyball team, Rikberg competed at the 2015, 2017 and 2019 Men's European Volleyball Championship, finishing in 11th, 13th and 24th place respectively. He announced his retirement from the Estonia national team after the latter tournament.

== Sporting achievements ==
=== National team ===
- 2016 European League
- 2018 European League
- 2018 Challenger Cup

=== Individual ===
- 2010 Baltic League – Best Libero
- 2014 Baltic League – Best Libero
- 2015 Baltic League – Best Libero
- 2016 European League – Best Libero
- 2017 Baltic League – Best Libero

== Personal ==
His brother Alar is a volleyball coach.
