= 2009 Gulf Volleyball Clubs Champions Championship =

In 2009 the Gulf Volleyball Clubs Champions Championship was won by the Al-Ahli Saudi Football Club team.

== League standings ==
Pos	Club	P	W	L	GF	GA	Pts
1	Al-Ahli Saudi FC	5	5	0	15	5	10
2	Al-Qadsia	5	4	1	14	6	9
3	Al Arabi	5	3	2	13	9	8
4	Saham Club	5	2	3	6	10	7
5	Al-Nasr SC (Bahrain)	5	1	4	6	14	6
6	Al-Wasl F.C.	5	0	5	5	15	5

Source: kooora.com (Arabic)
