= 2006 Gulf Volleyball Clubs Champions Championship =

In 2006 the Gulf Volleyball Clubs Champions Championship was won by the Al-Hilal FC team.

== League standings ==
Pos	Club	P	W	L	GF	GA	Pts
1	Al-Hilal	5	5	0	15	1	10
2	Al-Nasr SC (Bahrain)	5	4	1	13	8	8
3	AlQadsia	5	3	2	11	7	7
4	Al-Nasr Dubai SC	5	2	3	9	11	5
5	Qatar SC	5	1	4	4	12	2
6	Sohar	5	0	5	2	15	0

Source: koora.com (Arabic)
