= Qatar Volleyball league 2013–2014 =

Volleyball league season

== League standings ==
- The first Four Teams Qualify to Qatar Cup.

Pos	Club	P	W	L	GF	GA	Pts
1	Al-Rayyan	20	17	3	54	21	50
2	Police	20	16	4	53	18	48
3	Al-Jaish	20	16	4	53	20	48
4	Al-Arabi	20	15	5	50	21	46
5	Al-Ahli (Doha)	20	13	7	46	32	39
6	Qatar SC	20	10	10	36	41	26
7	Al-Sadd	20	9	11	34	41	26
8	Al-Khor	20	6	14	26	50	17
9	Al-Wakra	20	4	16	23	51	14
10	Al-Gharaffa	20	2	18	19	57	9
11	Al-shammal	20	2	18	17	58	7
