= 2010 Gulf Volleyball Clubs Champions Championship =

In 2010, the GCC Volleyball Club Championship was staged in Oman. The championship was won by the Al Arabi Qatar team.

== League standings ==
Pos	Club	P	W	L	GF	GA	Pts
1	Al Arabi	5	4	1	14	5	9
2	Al-Hilal	5	4	1	14	6	9
3	Al-Muharraq SC	5	4	1	13	8	9
4	Al-Qadsia	5	2	3	8	9	7
5	Al-Nasr Dubai SC	5	1	4	4	13	6
6	Sohar SC	5	0	5	3	15	5

Source: koora.com (Arabic)
