= Emir of Qatar Cup (volleyball) =

- Founded: 1979; 46 years ago
- Country: Qatar
- Number of clubs: 11
- Current champions: Al Rayyan (2021)
- Most championships: Al Arabi (23)

The Emir of Qatar Cup is a most Important Cup after Crown prince Cup in Qatar at the top of the Qatari volleyball player. It was founded in 1979.

== Champions ==
| Season | Champion | Runner-up |
|---|---|---|
| 1979-80 | Al Arabi | Al Rayyan |
| 1980-81 | Al Arabi | Al Rayyan |
| 1981-82 | Al Arabi | Al Rayyan |
| 1982-83 | Al Arabi | Al Rayyan |
| 1983-84 | Al Arabi | Al Rayyan |
| 1984-85 | Al Arabi | Al Rayyan |
| 1985-86 | Al Arabi | Al Sadd |
| 1986-87 | Al Rayyan | Al Sadd |
| 1987-88 | Al Arabi | Al Ahli |
| 1988-89 | Al Rayyan | Al Ahli |
| 1989-90 | Al Arabi | Al Sadd |
| 1990-91 | Al Arabi | Al Rayyan |
| 1991-92 | Al Arabi | N/A |
| 1992-93 | Al Arabi | Al Rayyan |
| 1993-94 | Al Rayyan | Al Arabi |
| 1994-95 | Al Arabi | Al Ahli |
| 1995-96 | Al Arabi | Al Ahli |
| 1996-97 | Qatar SC | Al Rayyan |
| 1997-98 | Al Arabi | Al Rayyan |
| 1998-99 | Al Rayyan | Qatar SC |
| 1999–2000 | Al Rayyan | Al Arabi |
| 2000–2001 | Qatar SC | Al Arabi |
| 2001–2002 | Al Arabi | Qatar SC |
| 2002–2003 | Al Rayyan | Qatar SC |
| 2003–2004 | Qatar SC | Al Arabi |
| 2004–2005 | Qatar SC | Al Rayyan |
| 2005–2006 | Al Rayyan | Qatar SC |
| 2006–2007 | Al Rayyan | Al Arabi |
| 2007–2008 | Al Arabi | Police SC |
| 2008–2009 | Al Arabi | Police SC |
| 2009–2010 | Al Rayyan | Qatar SC |
| 2010–2011 | Al Arabi | Al Rayyan |
| 2011–2012 | Al Rayyan | Al Arabi |
| 2012–2013 | Al Rayyan | Police SC |
| 2013–2014 | Al Arabi | Police SC |
| 2014–2015 | Al Arabi | Al Rayyan |
| 2015–2016 | Al Arabi | El Jaish |
| 2016–2017 | Al Rayyan | Al Arabi |
| 2017–2018 | Al Rayyan | Al Ahli SC (Doha) |
| 2018–2019 | Al Rayyan | Police SC |
| 2019–2020 | Al Arabi | Police SC |
| 2020–2021 | Al Rayyan | Al Arabi |
| 2021–2022 | Police SC | Al Arabi |
| 2022–2023 | Al Rayyan | Al Arabi |
