= Kristo Kollo =

Estonian volleyball and beach volleyball player (born 1990)

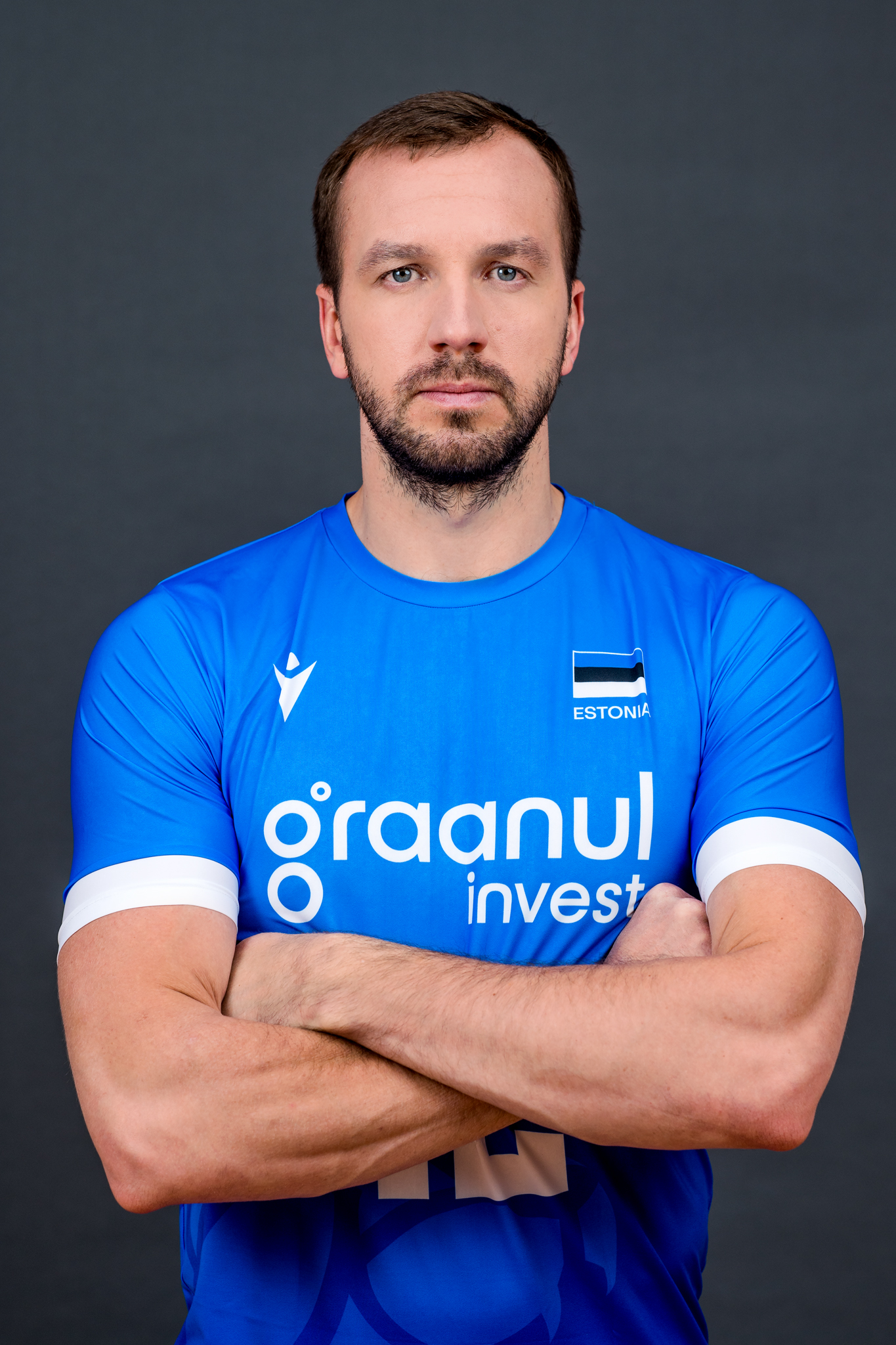
- Kristo Kollo in 2022

Personal information
- Nationality: Estonian
- Born: 17 January 1990 (age 36); Tartu
- Height: 1.90 m (6 ft 3 in)
- Weight: 89 kg (196 lb)
- Spike: 330 cm (130 in)
- Block: 320 cm (126 in)

Beach volleyball information
Years	Teammate
2007; 2007–2008; 2011; 2012–2015; 2016	Martti Juhkami; Oliver Venno; Argo Arak; Rivo Vesik; Karl Jaani

Indoor volleyball information
- Position: Outside hitter

Career
Years	Teams
2007–2012	(Estonia) Pere Leib Tartu
2013–2015	(Estonia) Bigbank Tartu
2015–2016	(Finland) Kyyjärven Kyky
2016–2018	(Switzerland) TV Schönenwerd
2018–2019	(Italy) VBC Mondovì
2019–2020	(Romania) CS Arcada Galați
2020–2021	(Estonia) Selver Tallinn
2021–2022	(Finland) Akaa-Volley
2022–	(Cyprus) Pafiakos Paphos

National team
2014–	Estonia
Honours
Men's volleyball
Representing Estonia
European League
Gold medal – first place	2018 Czech Republic
Bronze medal – third place	2021 Belgium
Challenger Cup
Bronze medal – third place	2018 Portugal
- Last updated: 20 December 2022

Kristo Kollo (born 17 January 1990) is an Estonian volleyball and beach volleyball player who currently plays for Cypriot club Pafiakos Paphos. He also represents the Estonian national team internationally.

As a member of the senior Estonia men's national volleyball team, Kollo competed at the 2017, 2019 and 2021 European Volleyball Championships.

== Sporting achievements ==
=== Clubs ===
Baltic League

- 2007/2008 – with Pere Leib Tartu
- 2008/2009 – with Pere Leib Tartu
- 2009/2010 – with Pere Leib Tartu
- 2011/2012 – with Pere Leib Tartu
- 2013/2014 – with Bigbank Tartu
- 2014/2015 – with Bigbank Tartu
- 2020/2021 – with Selver Tallinn

National championship

- 2007/2008 Estonian Championship, with Pere Leib Tartu
- 2008/2009 Estonian Championship, with Pere Leib Tartu
- 2009/2010 Estonian Championship, with Pere Leib Tartu
- 2010/2011 Estonian Championship, with Pere Leib Tartu
- 2011/2012 Estonian Championship, with Pere Leib Tartu
- 2013/2014 Estonian Championship, with Bigbank Tartu
- 2014/2015 Estonian Championship, with Bigbank Tartu
- 2016/2017 Swiss Championship, with TV Schönenwerd
- 2019/2020 Romanian Championship, with CS Arcada Galați
- 2020/2021 Estonian Championship, with Selver Tallinn
- 2021/2022 Finnish Championship, with Akaa-Volley

National cup

- 2007/2008 Estonian Cup, with Pere Leib Tartu
- 2008/2009 Estonian Cup, with Pere Leib Tartu
- 2011/2012 Estonian Cup, with Pere Leib Tartu
- 2013/2014 Estonian Cup, with Bigbank Tartu
- 2019/2020 Romanian Supercup, with CS Arcada Galați
- 2020/2021 Estonian Cup, with Selver Tallinn

=== National team ===
- 2018 European League
- 2018 Challenger Cup
- 2021 European League

=== Beach ===
- 2007 U18 European Championship, with Oliver Venno
- 2008 U19 World Championship, with Oliver Venno
- 2011 Estonian Championship, with Argo Arak
- 2016 Estonian Championship, with Karl Jaani
- 2020 Estonian Championship, with Oliver Venno
- 2022 Estonian Championship, with Karl Jaani
