= Alar Rikberg =

Estonian indiaca player and sport personnel (born 1981)

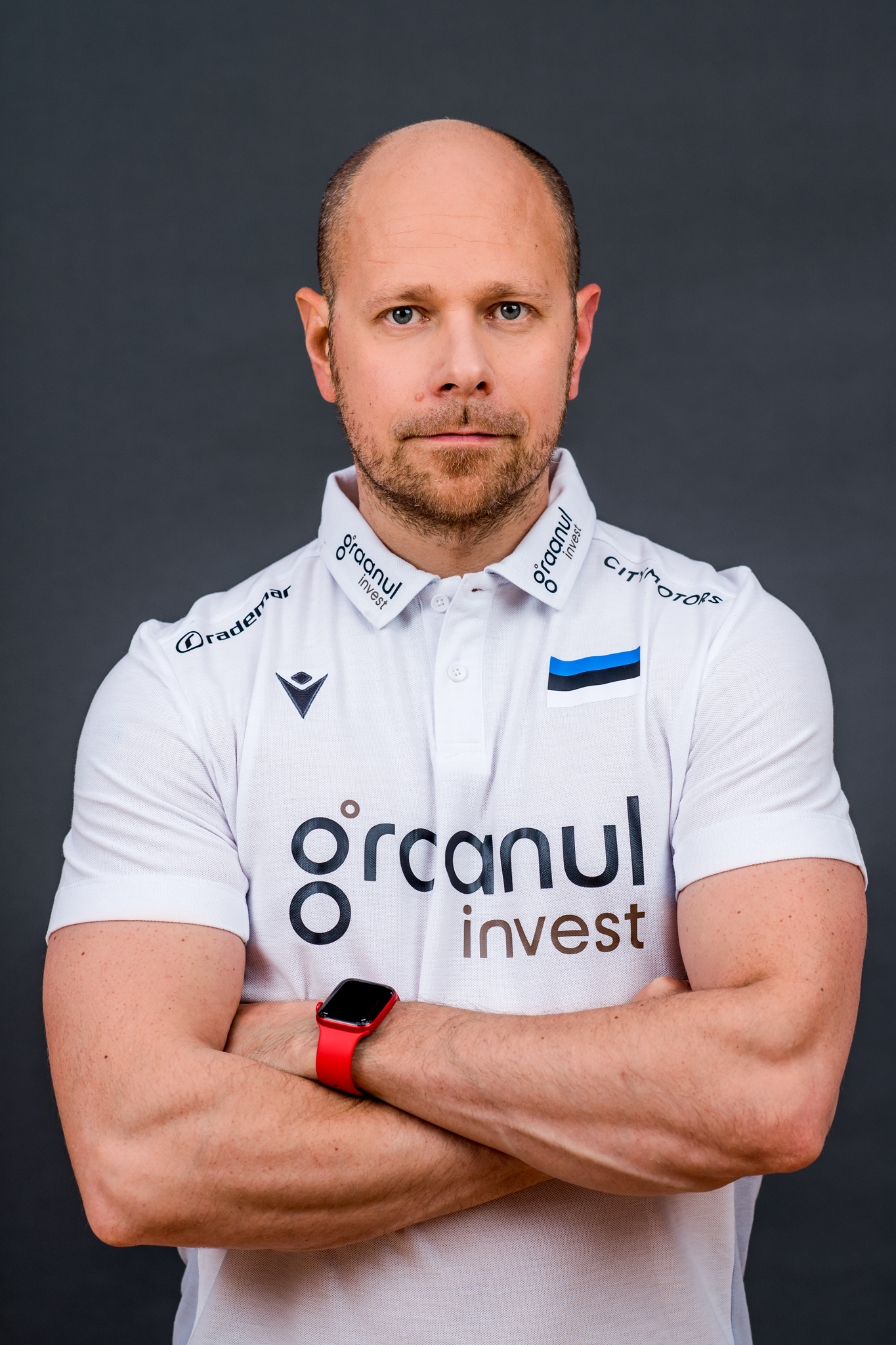
Alar Rikberg in 2022

Alar Rikberg (born 11 August 1981) is an Estonian volleyball coach, sport personnel and former indiaca player.

He was born in Tartu. In 2003, he graduated from the University of Tartu in public relations speciality.

He has won silver medal at World Indiaca Championships.

After 2010, he was the head of Tartu Tennis School. 2005–2018 he was the statistician of Estonia men's national volleyball team, 2019–22 statistician and an assistant coach, and from 2023 the head coach of Estonian national team.

Since 2020, he is the head coach of volleyball team Bigbank Tartu.

His brother is volleyball player Rait Rikberg.
