= Stefan Kaibald =

Estonian volleyball player (born 1997)

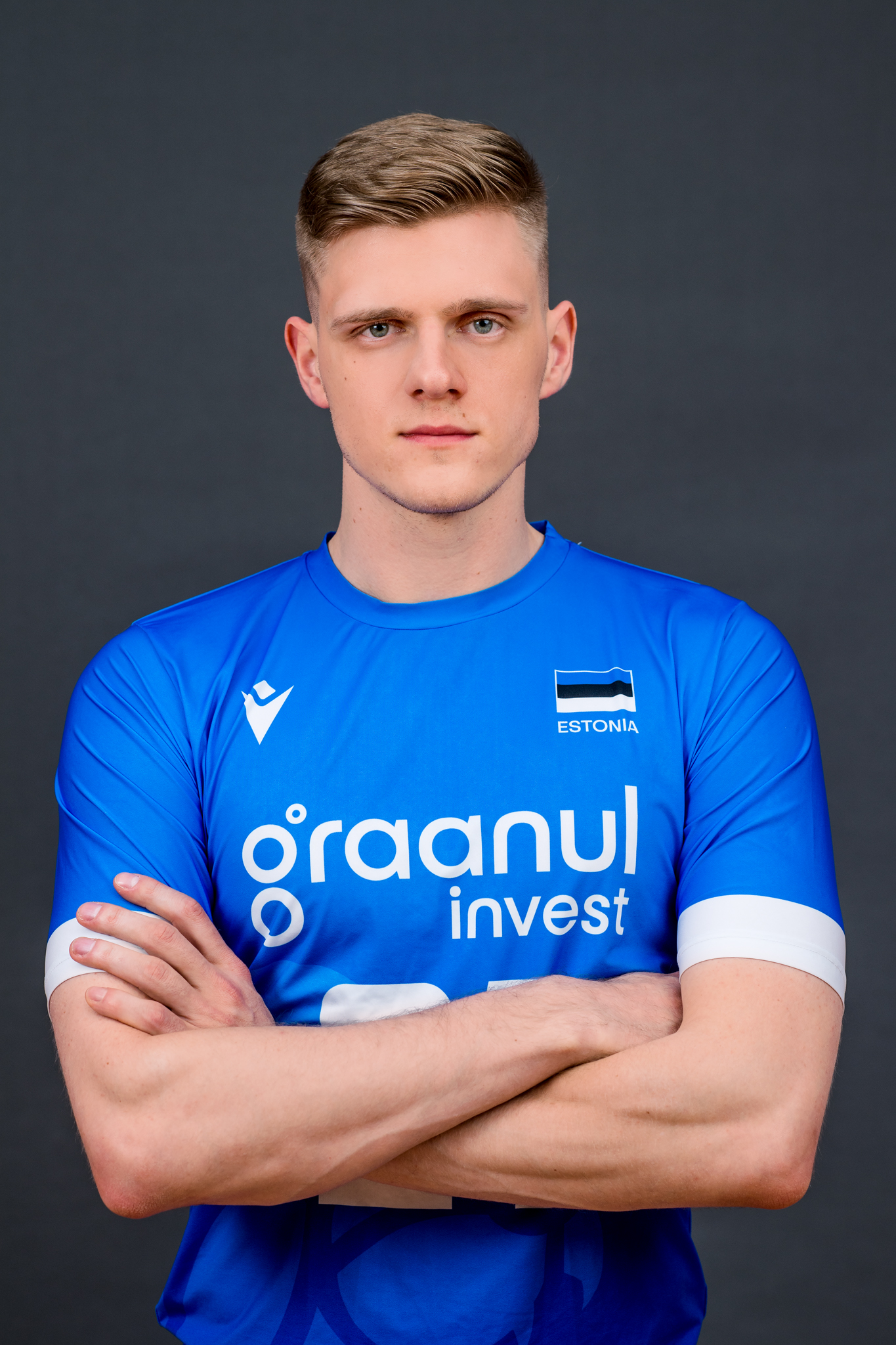

Personal information
- Full name: Stefan Kaibald
- Nationality: Estonian
- Born: 19 May 1997 (age 29)
- Height: 1.93 m (6 ft 4 in)

Volleyball information
- Position: Outside hitter
- Current club: Bigbank Tartu
- Number: 10

Career
Years	Teams
2013–2014; 2014–2015; 2015–2021; 2021–2022; 2022–2023; 2023–2024; 2024–	Danpower Võru/NK; Rakvere VK; Bigbank Tartu; Netzhoppers KW; SK Zadruga Aich/Dob; Haasrode Leuven; Bigbank Tartu

National team
2018–	Estonia

Stefan Kaibald (born 19 May 1997) is an Estonian volleyball player. He is a member of the Estonian national team and represented his country at the 2021 European Volleyball Championships.
