= Albert Hurt =

Estonian volleyball player (born 1999)

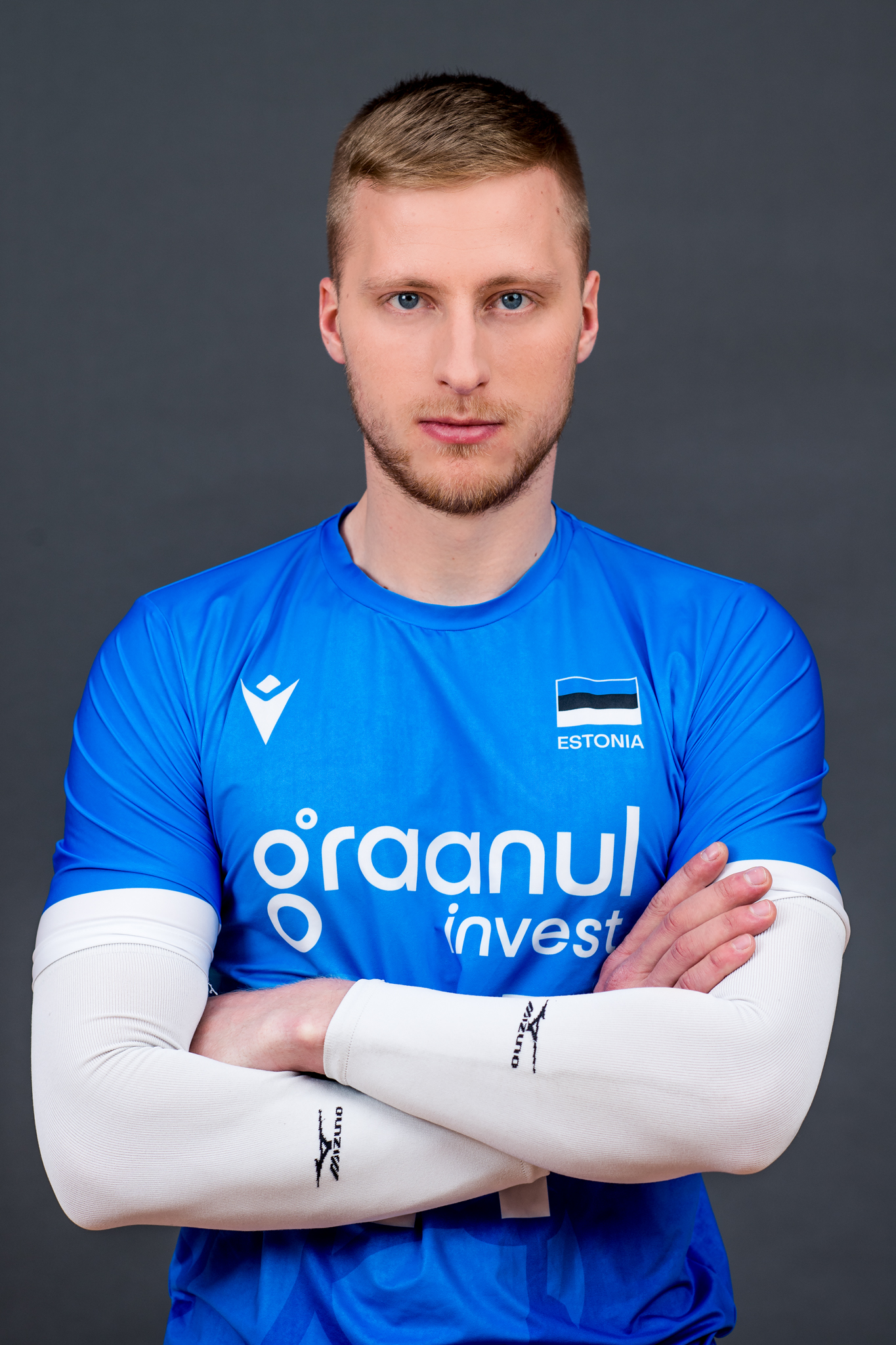

Personal information
- Full name: Albert Hurt
- Nationality: Estonian

National team
Estonia

Albert Hurt (born 22 April 1999) is an Estonian volleyball player. He is a member of the Estonian national team and represented his country at the 2021 European Volleyball Championships.
