= Al Sadd Volleyball Team =

Qatari volleyball club

Al Sadd SC
- Full name: Al Sadd SC Volleyball
- Short name: QTR
- Founded: 21 October 1969 (56 years ago)
- Ground: Jassim Bin Hamad Stadium; Doha, Qatar
- Chairman: (Qatar) Sheikh Hamad bin Suhaim Al Thani
- League: Qatari Volleyball League
- 2016/17: 10

Uniforms
Home	Away

Al Sadd's active sections
Football	Basketball	Handball
Volleyball	Futsal	Athletics

Al Sadd Volleyball ( طائرة السد) is the professional volleyball team of Al Sadd SC based in Doha, Qatar. It competes in the Qatari Volleyball League.

== Honors ==
Al Sadd Volleyball has 1 official championship:

=== Domestic ===
- QVA Cup

Winners (1): 2007

== See also ==
- Al Sadd SC
