= Mihkel Juhkami =

Estonian politician

Mihkel Juhkami (born 12 July 1963) is an Estonian politician. He was a member of XI Riigikogu and the mayor of Rakvere from 2013 until 2017.
