= Qatar Volleyball league 2014–2015 =

== League standings ==
- The first four teams Qualify to Qatar Cup.

Pos	Club	P	W	L	GF	GA	Pts
1	Al-Rayyan	20	18	2	56	20	54
2	Al-Arabi	20	17	3	55	12	51
3	Al-Jaish	20	16	4	53	20	47
4	Police	20	15	5	50	26	46
5	Al-Ahli (Doha)	20	11	9	40	35	33
6	Al-shammal	20	10	10	36	37	29
7	Al-Khor	20	7	13	28	46	18
8	Al-Wakra	20	5	15	21	52	15
9	Al-Sadd	20	5	15	24	51	14
10	Al-Gharaffa	20	3	17	25	54	12
11	Qatar SC	20	3	17	20	55	11
