= Kuwaiti Men's Volleyball League =

- Current season, competition or edition: 2024–25 Kuwaiti League
- Sport: Volleyball
- First season: 1965; 61 years ago
- Administrator: KVA
- No. of teams: 11 teams
- Country: Kuwait
- Confederation: AVC
- Continent: Asia
- Most recent champion: Kuwait SC (16th titles) (2024–25)
- Most titles: Qadsia SC (23 titles)
- Level on pyramid: Level 1
- Relegation to: National 2
- Domestic cups: Kuwaiti Cup; Kuwaiti Super Cup
- International cups: AVC Champions League; Arab Clubs Championship

The Kuwaiti Men's Volleyball League ( Arabic : الدوري الكويتي لكرة الطائرة للرجال ) is the highest level of men's Volleyball in Kuwait and it is organized by the Kuwait Volleyball Association. Kuwaiti Volleyball League is currently contested by 11 clubs around the country as of the last season 2024–25.

The regular season is played by 11 teams, playing each other twice, once at home and once away from home. After that the best placed 4 teams will qualify to the semifinals the first in the ranking table play the fourth and the 2nd in rank play the third, the final match will define the champion, last placed two teams were automatically relegated to the second division.

== Titles by Clubs ==
Rank	Team name	Titles
1	Qadsia SC	23
2	Kuwait SC	16
=	Kazma SC	15
4	Al Arabi SC	3
5	Al Jahra SC	1

== Winners list ==
Year	Champion
1965–66	Kuwait SC
1966–67	Kuwait SC
1967–68	Kazma SC
1968–69	Kuwait SC
1969–70	Qadsia SC
1970–71	Kuwait SC
1971–72	Kuwait SC
1972–73	Kuwait SC
1973–74	Kazma SC
1974–75	Qadsia SC
1975–76	Kazma SC
1976–77	Kuwait SC
1977–78	Kuwait SC
1978–79	Kuwait SC
1979–80	Qadsia SC
1980–81	Qadsia SC
1981–82	Qadsia SC
1982–83	Qadsia SC
1983–84	Qadsia SC
1984–85	Qadsia SC
1985–86	Qadsia SC
1986–87	Qadsia SC

Year	Champion
1987–88	Qadsia SC
1988–89	Qadsia SC
1989–90	Qadsia SC
1990–91	Not Played
1991–92	Qadsia SC
1992–93	Kazma SC
1993–94	Kazma SC
1994–95	Qadsia SC
1995–96	Qadsia SC
1996–97	Kazma SC
1997–98	Kazma SC
1998–99	Kazma SC
1999–2000	Al Jahra SC
2000–01	Kazma SC
2001–02	Al Arabi SC
2002–03	Al Arabi SC
2003–04	Al Arabi SC
2004–05	Qadsia SC
2005–06	Qadsia SC
2006–07	Qadsia SC
2007–08	Qadsia SC
2008–09	Qadsia SC

Year	Champion
2009–10	Kazma SC
2010–11	Kazma SC
2011–12	Kazma SC
2012–13	Qadsia SC
2013–14	Not Played
2014–15	Kazma SC
2015–16	Kazma SC
2016–17	Kuwait SC
2017–18	Kazma SC
2018–19	Kuwait SC
2019–20	Kuwait SC
2020–21	Qadsia SC
2021–22	Kuwait SC
2022–23	Kuwait SC
2023–24	Kuwait SC
2024–25	Kuwait SC
