= El Jaish SC (volleyball) =

El-Jaish SC
- Full name: El-Jaish SC Volleyball
- Short name: JSH
- Founded: 2007; 18 years ago
- Ground: Abdullah bin Khalifa Stadium; Doha, Qatar
- Chairman: (Qatar) Hamad bin Ali Al Attiyah
- League: Qatari Volleyball League
- 2016/17: 2nd

Uniforms
| Home | Away |

El Jaish Volleyball (Arabic: طائرة الجيش) is the professional volleyball team of El Jaish SC, based in Doha, Qatar. It competes in the Qatari Volleyball League. The team was officially founded in 2007, and has been a dominant force in the QVL since its formation.

== Honors ==
3 official championships.

=== Domestic ===
- QVA Cup

Winners (3): 2012, 2013, 2015

=== International ===
- Arab Clubs Championship

Third Place: 2015
Second Place: 2017

== Managerial history ==
- (Montenegro) Ivan Joksimovic (2014, 2016–17)
