= GCC Volleyball Club Championship =

Gulf Clubs Champions Championship
- Sport: Volleyball
- Founded: 1982
- Country: Gulf members
- Most recent champion: Police SC Qatar
- Most titles: (Bahrain) Al-Muharraq SC (10 titles)

The GCC Volleyball Club Championship is a sports competition for club volleyball teams, currently held annually and organized by the Gulf Volleyball Association by the member states of the Gulf Cooperation Council.

== Results ==
- In 1982, the competition was played in all GCC countries.
- In 1991, the competition was canceled due to Gulf War.
- In 2005, Al-Muharraq SC and Qatar had the same points in the league, so they played an extra match.
- In 2011, 2012, and 2014, the competition was played as group stages.

Year	Host	Final			Third place match		
Year	Host	Champion	Score	Runner-up	Third place	Score	Fourth place
1982; Details	Gulf countries	(United Arab Emirates); Al Jazira	–			–	
1983; Details	United Arab Emirates	(Kuwait); AlQadsia	–			–	
1984; Details	Bahrain	(Kuwait); AlQadsia	–			–	
1985; Details	Saudi Arabia	(Saudi Arabia); AlAhli	–			–	
1986; Details	Qatar	(Kuwait); AlQadsia	–			–	
1987; Details	Kuwait	(Kuwait); AlQadsia	–			–	
1988; Details	United Arab Emirates	(Saudi Arabia); AlAhli	–			–	
1989; Details	Bahrain	(Bahrain); AlNajma	–			–	
1990; Details	Saudi Arabia	(Kuwait); AlQadsia	–			–	
1991; Details		Cancelled			Cancelled		
1992; Details	Oman	(Kuwait); AlQadsia	–			–	
1993; Details	Bahrain	(Bahrain); Al-Nasr	–			–	
1994; Details	Kuwait	(Saudi Arabia); AlAhli	–			–	
1995; Details	United Arab Emirates	(Bahrain); Al-Muharraq SC	–			–	
1996; Details	Bahrain	(Bahrain); Al-Muharraq SC	–			–	
1997; Details	Saudi Arabia	(Bahrain); Al-Muharraq SC	–			–	
1998; Details	Oman	(Bahrain); Al-Muharraq SC	–			–	
1999; Details	Qatar	(Bahrain); Al-Muharraq SC	–			–	
2000; Details	Kuwait	(Bahrain); Al-Muharraq SC	–			–	
2001; Details	United Arab Emirates	(Bahrain); Al-Muharraq SC	–			–	
2002; Details	Bahrain	(Bahrain); Al-Muharraq SC	–			–	
2003; Details	Saudi Arabia	(Saudi Arabia); Al Hilal	–			–	
2004; Details	Oman	(Bahrain); AlNajma	-			-	
2005; Details	Qatar	(Bahrain); Al-Muharraq SC	3–1	Qatar SC	(United Arab Emirates); Al-Nasr Dubai SC	–	(Saudi Arabia); Al-Hilal FC
2006; Details	Kuwait	(Saudi Arabia); Al-Hilal FC	-	(Bahrain); Al-Nasr	(Kuwait); AlQadsia	-	(United Arab Emirates); Al-Nasr Dubai SC
2007; Details	United Arab Emirates	(Saudi Arabia); Al-Hilal FC	–	(Qatar); Al Arabi	(Bahrain); Al-Muharraq SC	–	(Kuwait); AlQadsia
2008; Details	Bahrain	(Kuwait); AlQadsia	–	(United Arab Emirates); Al-Nasr Dubai SC	(Saudi Arabia); Al-Hilal FC	–	(Bahrain); Al-Nasr
2009; Details	Saudi Arabia	(Saudi Arabia); Al-Ahli	–	(Kuwait); AlQadsia	(Qatar); Al Arabi	–	(Oman); Saham
2010; Details	Oman	(Qatar); Al Arabi	–	(Saudi Arabia); Al-Hilal FC	(Bahrain); Al-Muharraq SC	–	(Kuwait); AlQadsia
2011; Details	Qatar	(Qatar); Al Rayyan	3–1	(Bahrain); Al-Muharraq SC	(Oman); Saham	3–2	(Qatar); Al Arabi
2012; Details	Kuwait	(Bahrain); Al-Muharraq SC	3–1	(Qatar); Al Arabi	(Kuwait); AlQadsia	3–0	(United Arab Emirates); Al Ain
2013; Details	Bahrain	(Saudi Arabia); Al-Hilal FC	–	(Bahrain); Al-Nasr	(Qatar); Al Arabi	–	(Kuwait); Kazma
2014; Details	Bahrain	(Saudi Arabia); Al-Ahli	3–1	(Qatar); Al Rayyan	(Bahrain); Al-Ahli	3–0	(Bahrain); Al-Nasr
2015; Details	Saudi Arabia	(Qatar); Al Rayyan	–	(Qatar); Police SC	(Bahrain); Al-Ahli	–	(Saudi Arabia); Al-Ahli
2016; Details	Oman	(Qatar); Al Rayyan	3 – 0	(Qatar); Al Arabi	(Bahrain); Al-Ahli	3 –0	(Saudi Arabia); Al-Ahli
2017; Details	Qatar	(Bahrain); Dar Kulaib Club	-	(Qatar); Al Rayyan	(Oman); Al-Salam	-	(Bahrain); Al-Ahli
2018; Details		Not held			Not held		
2019; Details		Not held			Not held		
2020; Details	Kuwait	Police SC Qatar	–	(Bahrain); Dar Kulaib Club	Al Kuwait SC	–	(Saudi Arabia); Al-Hilal FC
2021-2022; Details	Bahrain	Police SC Qatar	3–0	(Oman); AlKamil & AlWafi Club	(Bahrain); Al-Ahli	3–1	(Kuwait); AlQadsia

=== By Club ===
Club	Winner
(Bahrain) Al-Muharraq SC	10
(Kuwait) AlQadsia	7
(Saudi Arabia) Al-Ahli Saudi FC	5
(Saudi Arabia) Al-Hilal	4
(Qatar) Al Rayyan	3
Police SC Qatar	2
(Bahrain) AlNajma	2
(Qatar) Al Arabi	1
(Bahrain) Al-Nasr	1
(United Arab Emirates) Al-Jazira	1
(Bahrain) DarKulaib	1

=== By Country ===
Country	Winner	Years won
Bahrain	14	1989, 1993, 1995, 1996, 1997, 1998, 1999, 2000, 2001, 2002, 2004, 2005, 2012, 2017
Saudi Arabia	9	1985, 1988, 1994, 2003, 2006, 2007, 2009, 2013, 2014
Kuwait	7	1983, 1984, 1986, 1987, 1990, 1992, 2008
Qatar	6	2010, 2011, 2015, 2016, 2020, 2021-22
United Arab Emirates	1	1982
