= Martti Juhkami =

Estonian volleyball player

- Juhkami in 2022

Personal information
- Full name: Martti Juhkami
- Nationality: Estonian
- Born: 6 June 1988 (age 38); Rakvere, then part of Estonian SSR, Soviet Union
- Height: 1.95 m (6 ft 5 in)
- Weight: 91 kg (201 lb)
- Spike: 352 cm (139 in)
- Block: 325 cm (128 in)

Volleyball information
- Position: Outside hitter
- Current club: Bigbank Tartu
- Number: 6

Career
Years	Teams
2005–2009; 2009–2012; 2012–2013; 2013–2014; 2014–2015; 2015–2016; 2016–2017; 2017–2019; 2019–2021; 2021–2022; 2022–2023; 2023–	(Estonia) Aeroc Rakvere (Estonia) Pere Leib Tartu (Estonia) Selver Tallinn (Germany) TV Bühl (Austria) Hypo Tirol Innsbruck (France) Rennes Volley 35 (Austria) Hypo Tirol Innsbruck (France) Tourcoing VB (Germany) VfB Friedrichshafen (Estonia) Bigbank Tartu (Czech Republic) ČEZ Karlovarsko (Estonia) Bigbank Tartu

National team
2011–	Estonia
- Last updated: 21 July 2023

Martti Juhkami (born 6 June 1988) is an Estonian volleyball player, a member of the Estonia men's national volleyball team and Estonian club Bigbank Tartu.

== Estonian national team ==
On 24 October 2011 was appointed to the Estonian national team by head coach Avo Keel. He debuted in senior team on 18 November 2011. It was a friendly match against Latvia (3–2) in Kuressaare, Estonia where he scored 13 points.

As a member of the senior Estonia men's national volleyball team, Juhkami competed at the 2015 and 2019 Men's European Volleyball Championships.

== Sporting achievements ==
=== Clubs ===
MEVZA Cup

- 2014/2015 – with Hypo Tirol Innsbruck
- 2016/2017 – with Hypo Tirol Innsbruck

Baltic League

- 2009/2010 – with Pere Leib Tartu
- 2011/2012 – with Pere Leib Tartu
- 2021/2022 – with Bigbank Tartu
- 2023/2024 – with Bigbank Tartu
- 2024/2025 – with Bigbank Tartu

National championship

- 2009/2010 Estonian Championship, with Pere Leib Tartu
- 2010/2011 Estonian Championship, with Pere Leib Tartu
- 2011/2012 Estonian Championship, with Pere Leib Tartu
- 2012/2013 Estonian Championship, with Selver Tallinn
- 2013/2014 German Championship, with TV Bühl
- 2014/2015 Austrian Championship, with Hypo Tirol Innsbruck
- 2016/2017 Austrian Championship, with Hypo Tirol Innsbruck
- 2020/2021 German Championship, with VfB Friedrichshafen
- 2021/2022 Estonian Championship, with Bigbank Tartu
- 2022/2023 Czech Championship, with ČEZ Karlovarsko

National cup

- 2011/2012 Estonian Cup, with Pere Leib Tartu
- 2012/2013 Estonian Cup, with Selver Tallinn
- 2015/2016 French Cup, with Rennes Volley 35
- 2017/2018 French Cup, with Tourcoing VB
- 2019/2020 German SuperCup, with VfB Friedrichshafen
- 2021/2022 Estonian Cup, with Bigbank Tartu
- 2022/2023 Czech SuperCup, with ČEZ Karlovarsko
- 2023/2024 Estonian Cup, with Bigbank Tartu
- 2024/2025 Estonian Cup, with Bigbank Tartu

=== Individual ===
- 2012 Baltic League – Best opposite hitter
- 2013 Baltic League – Best server
- 2016 French Ligue B – Best outside hitter
- 2020 Estonian Volleyball Player of the Year
- 2022 Estonian League – Best outside hitter
- 2022 Czech SuperCup – Most valuable player
- 2025 Baltic League – Best opposite hitter
