= Qatar SC (volleyball team) =

Qatari volleyball club

- Full name: Qatar SC Volleyball
- Short name: QTR
- Founded: 1959; 66 years ago
- Ground: Suhaim Bin Hamad Stadium; Doha, Qatar
- Chairman: (Qatar) Sheikh Hamad bin Suhaim Al Thani
- League: Qatari Volleyball League
- 2016/17: 6

Uniforms
Home	Away

Qatar Volleyball (طائرة قطر) is a professional Volleyball team based in Doha, Qatar. It competes in the Qatari Volleyball League.

== Honors ==
10 official championships.

=== Domestic ===
- Qatar Volleyball League

Winners (4): 1999, 2000, 2002, 2005

- Emir Cup

Winners (4): 1997, 2001, 2004, 2005

- Crown Prince Cup

Winners (2): 2004, 2005

=== International ===
- GCC Club Championship

Runners-up:2005

== See also ==
- Qatar SC
