= Police SC Qatar =

Qatari volleyball club

Police SC
- Full name: Police SC Volleyball
- Short name: QTR
- Founded: 2007; 18 years ago
- Ground: Jassim Bin Hamad Stadium; Doha, Qatar
- Chairman: (Qatar) Sheikh Hamad bin Suhaim Al Thani
- League: Qatari Volleyball League
- 2016/17: 1st

Uniforms
Home	Away

Police Volleyball ( طائرة السد) is a professional volleyball team based in Doha, Qatar. It competes in the Qatari Volleyball League.

== Honors ==
1 official championships.

=== Domestic ===
- Qatar Volleyball League

Winners (4): 2017, 2019, 2020, 2021

- Emir Cup

Winners (1): 2022

- Qatar Cup

Winners (1): 2023

- QVA Cup

Winners (1): 2008

=== International ===
- GCC Club Championship

Winners (2): 2020, 2022
Runners-up: 2015

- West Asian Championship

Third place: 2023

- Asian Club Championship

Third place: 2023
