= Al Arabi Qatar (volleyball) =

Qatari volleyball club

Al Arabi
- Full name: Al Arabi Volleyball
- Short name: ARB
- Founded: 1952; 73 years ago
- Ground: Mohammed Bin Hamad AlHitmi Indoor Hall; Doha, Qatar (Capacity: 2000)
- Chairman: (Qatar) Sheikh Tamim Bin Fahad Al-Thani
- Manager: (Tunisia) Mawya Alajnaf
- Captain: (Qatar) Saeed Salem
- League: Qatari Volleyball League
- 2016/17: 3rd

Uniforms
Home	Away

Al Arabi Volleyball (Arabic: طائرة العربي) is a professional Volleyball team based in Doha, Qatar. It competes in the Qatari Volleyball League. The team automatically qualified for the 2009, 2010, and 2011 edition of the FIVB Volleyball Men's Club World Championship as Qatar were the hosts. In 2012 Al Arabi team qualified for the FIVB Volleyball Men's Club World Championship as the Champion of AVC Club Volleyball Championship They have never advanced past the group stage in their appearances.

The volleyball team is part of the broader club Al-Arabi SC.

== Honors ==
=== Domestic ===
- Qatar Volleyball League
  - Winners (26): 1980, 1981, 1982, 1983, 1984, 1985, 1986, 1987, 1988, 1989, 1990, 1991, 1992, 1994, 1996, 1997, 2003, 2004, 2006, 2008, 2009, 2010, 2011, 2012, 2016, 2024
- Emir Cup
  - Winners (23): 1980, 1981, 1982, 1983, 1984, 1985, 1986, 1988, 1990, 1991, 1992, 1993, 1995, 1996, 1998, 2002, 2008, 2009, 2011, 2014, 2015, 2016, 2020
- Crown Prince Cup
  - Winners (16): 1991, 1992, 1994, 1996, 1997, 1998, 1999, 2000, 2001, 2006, 2008, 2009, 2012, 2014, 2015, 2017, 2019
- Qatar Super Cup
  - Winners (3): 2014, 2015,2016
- QVA Cup
  - Winners (2): 2014, 2016

=== Regional competitions ===
- 22 February Cup
  - Winners (1): 1983

=== International ===
- Asian Club Championship
  - Winners (1): 2012
  - Runners-up: 2010, 2015, 2016
  - Third Place: 2007, 2009
- GCC Club Championship
  - Winners (1): 2010
  - Runners-up: 2007, 2012, 2016
  - Third Place: 2009, 2013
  - Fourth Place: 2011
- Arab Clubs Championship
  - Winners (1): 2003
  - Runners-up: 2002
  - Third Place:: 1992, 2005
  - Fourth Place: 1997, 2006, 2008, 2018

== Squad ==
Squad for 2011 FIVB Men's Club World Championship (As of October 8, 2011):
Head coach: (Tunisia) Mawya Alajnaf

Number	Name	Nationality	Height	Spike	Block
2	Jiří Popelka	Czech Republic	2.04	3.47	3.35
3	Saeed Salem (captain)	Qatar	1.87	N/A	N/A
4	Ribeiro Renan (libero)	Brazil	1.94	N/A	N/A
6	Christian Pampel	Germany	1.98	3.60	3.40
7	Mohammad Khuzaie	Qatar	1.92	N/A	N/A
8	Davide Saitta	Italy	1.88	N/A	N/A
9	Gianluca Saraceni	Italy	1.98	3.64	N/A
10	Omar Hashim	Qatar	1.96	N/A	N/A
11	Lukasz Kadziewicz	Poland	2.06	3.60	3.35
12	Tije Vlam	Netherlands	2.07	3.47	3.30
14	Saoud Abdulaziz	Qatar	1.85	N/A	N/A
18	Saed Al Hitmi	Qatar	1.86	3.35	3.25

== Technical staff ==
Name	Role	Nationality
Abdulla AlHitmi	Manager	(Qatar) Qatari
Nasser Al-Sulaiti	Assistant manager	(Qatar) Qatari
Mawya Alajnaf	Coach	(Tunisia) Tunisian
Marwan AlShukaily	Coach	(Tunisia) Tunisian
Mohammed Al Kuwari	Team manager	(Qatar) Qatari
Baghdadi Saleh	Physiotherapist	(Romania) Romanian

== Notable players ==
This list of former players includes those who received international caps while playing for the team, made significant contributions to the team in terms of appearances or goals while playing for the team, or who made significant contributions to the sport either before they played for the team, or after they left. It is clearly not yet complete and all inclusive, and additions and refinements will continue to be made over time.

Qatar

- (Qatar) Saed Al Hitmi
- (Qatar) Saeed Salem

Canada

- (Canada) Frederic Winters

Croatia

- (Croatia) Igor Omrčen

Germany

- (Germany) Christian Pampel

Poland

- (Poland) Mariusz Wlazły (Loan)
- (Poland) Łukasz Kadziewicz

Brazil

- (Brazil) Leandro Vissotto

Italy

- (Italy) Ivan Zaytsev (Loan)
- (Italy) (Cuba) Osmany Juantorena (Loan)
- (Italy) Dante Boninfante
- (Italy) Alexeis Argilagos
- (Italy) Davide Saita
- (Italy) Gianluca Saraceni

Serbia

- (Serbia) Ivan Miljković
- (Serbia) Uroš Kovačević (Loan)

Netherlands

- (Netherlands) Tije Vlam

Czech Republic

- (Czech Republic) Jiří Popelka

Finland

- (Finland) Matti Oivanen

United States

- (United States) Richard Lambourne

Cuba

- (Cuba) Salvador Hidalgo Oliva

Australia

- (Australia) Nathan Roberts

India

- (India) Raymond Williem

== Managerial history ==
- (Serbia) Dragan Mihailović (2007–08)
- (Tunisia) Mohamed Trabelsi (2009)
- (Algeria) Adel Sennoun (2010–?)
- (Romania) Gheorghe Crețu (2013–14)
- (Tunisia) Mawya Alajnaf (2015–)
