= Al Rayyan SC Volleyball Team =

Volleyball team in Qatar

Al Rayyan
- Full name: Al Rayyan Volleyball
- Founded: 1968
- Ground: Al Rayyan Indoor Arena; Al-Rayyan, Qatar (Capacity: 2,000)
- Chairman: Sheik Saoud Bin Khalid Al Thani
- Manager: Mubarak Eid
- League: Qatari Volleyball League
- 2022/23: Champion

Uniforms
Home	Away

Al Rayyan Volleyball (Arabic: الريان للكرة الطائرة) is a professional volleyball team based in Al-Rayyan, Qatar. It competes in the Qatari Volleyball League. They participated in the 2012 edition of the FIVB Volleyball Men's Club World Championship held in Qatar after winning the Heir Apparent Cup. The club hired four top athletes to strengthen the team before the 2012 Club World Championships. These include Rodrigão from Brazil, the Bulgarian brothers Georgi and Valentin Bratoev, and the American David Lee, a Gold medalist in Beijing 2008. They did not advance past the group stage. The best achievement for the Al Rayyan volleyball team was in 2014 when they came in the second place in the World Club championship. The squad included Michael Sánchez, Raphael Vieira de Oliveira, Matey Kaziyski and Robertlandy Simón as foreign players in the team. Al Rayan won the GCC Champions Cup in 2011 and 2015 as well as the Arab championship and Asian cup.

== Honors ==
=== Domestic ===
- Qatar Volleyball League

Winners (12): 1993, 1995, 1998, 2001, 2007, 2013, 2014, 2015, 2018, 2022, 2023, 2025

- Emir Cup

Winners (16): 1987, 1989, 1994, 1999, 2000, 2003, 2006, 2007, 2010, 2012, 2013, 2017, 2018, 2019, 2021, 2023

- Crown Prince Cup

Winners (9): 1993, 1995, 2002, 2003, 2007, 2010, 2011, 2013, 2016

=== International ===
- Asian Club Championship

Champions: 2025
Runners-up: 2013, 2014
Third place: 2019
Fourth place: 2002

- World Club Championship

Runners-up: 2014

- GCC Volleyball Club Championship

Winners (3): 2011, 2015, 2016
Runners-up: 2014, 2017

- Arab Volleyball Clubs Championship

Winners (3): 2018, 2019, 2022
Runners-up: 1998, 2012
Third place: 2017
Fourth place: 2001, 2005

- Arab Volleyball Clubs Championship Cup Winners

Winners (1): 2000

- West Asian Volleyball Clubs Championship

Winners (2): 2023, 2024

== Squad ==
Squad for 2014 FIVB Volleyball Men's Club World Championship

- Head coach: (Croatia) Igor Arbutina

Number	Player
1	(Iran) Farhad Ghaemi
2	(Qatar) Ali Hassan Asadi
4	(Qatar) Mohamed Al-Oui
5	(Morocco) Mohamed Hachdadi
6	(Cuba) Michael Sánchez
7	(Brazil) Raphael Vieira de Oliveira
9	(Qatar) Ali Bairami (c)
10	(Qatar) Mohammed Abdulla
11	(Cuba) Robertlandy Simón
12	(Qatar) Mubarak Dahi Waleed
13	(Qatar) Ali Hamed Yaqub
16	(Brazil) Alan Domingos (L)

== Technical staff ==
As of 1 August 2017/

Name	Role	Nationality
Carlos Eduardo Schwanke	Head coach	(Brazil) Brazilian
Mubarak Al-Abdulla	Manager	(Qatar) Qatari
Toufik Benmessadek	Assistant coach	(Algeria) Algerian
Ali Issac	Assistant coach	(Qatar) Qatari
Vladimir Nikolić	Physiotherapist	(Serbia) Serbian
Arnaout Mohammed	Doctor	(Tunisia) Tunisian

== Notable players ==
This list of former players includes those who received international caps while playing for the team, made significant contributions to the team in terms of appearances or goals while playing for the team, or who made significant contributions to the sport either before they played for the team, or after they left. It is clearly not yet complete and all inclusive, and additions and refinements will continue to be made over time.

Qatar

- (Qatar) Ali Eshagh Bairami
- (Qatar) Ali Hamid Yaghoub
- (Qatar) Abdulrashid Awel Abdulrahman

Brazil

- (Brazil) Ramon Moreno
- (Brazil) Alan Domingos
- (Brazil) Raphael Vieira de Oliveira (Loan)
- (Brazil) Rodrigo Santana (Loan)

Bulgaria

- (Bulgaria) Matey Kaziyski (Loan)
- (Bulgaria) Valentin Bratoev

Croatia

- (Croatia) Igor Omrčen
- (Croatia) Mario Močić

Cuba

- (Cuba) Yosleider Cala
- (Cuba) Wilfredo León
- (Cuba) Leonel Marshall Jr.
- (Cuba) Alberto Daniel La Rosa Marquez
- (Cuba) Raidel Poey
- (Cuba) Javier González Panton
- (Cuba) Robertlandy Simón (Loan)

Estonia

- (Estonia) Oliver Venno

Venezuela

- (Venezuela) Carlos Tejeda

France

- (France) Philippe Barca-Cysique
- (France) Loic De Kergret
- (France) Antonin Rouzier (Loan)

Iran

- (Iran) Saber Kazemi
- (Iran) Farhad Ghaemi

Italy

- (Italy) Cristian Savani
- (Italy) Wout Wijsmans
- (Italy) (Cuba) Ángel Dennis
- (Italy) Hristo Zlatanov
- (Italy) Lorenzo Bernardi

Serbia

- (Serbia) Ivan Miljković (Loan)

Slovenia

- (Slovenia) Tine Urnaut

Finland

- (Finland) Mikko Oivanen (Loan)

United States

- (United States) David Cameron Lee (Loan)
- (United States) Brook Billings

Sweden

- (Sweden) Marcus Nilsson

Hungary

- (Hungary) Péter Veres

Kenya

- (Kenya) Phillip Kipyego Maiyo

Russia

- (Russia) Dmitriy Ilinykh

== Managerial history ==
- (Egypt) Ashraf Mehdi
- (Qatar) Eid Mubarak
- (Egypt) Mohammed Faraj (1987–90)
- (Serbia) Dragan Mihailović (2009/10)
- (Tunisia) Mohammed Al Bahri (2011/12 until February 2012)
- (Serbia) Dragan Popović (2012/2013) (Caretaker)
- (Serbia) Ljubomir Travica (2012/13 until March 2014)
- (Italy) Daniele Bagnoli (2014/15 until November 2015)
- (Croatia) Igor Arbutina (2009/2010, 2010/2011, 2012, March 2014, 2015/2016)
- (Brazil) Carlos Eduardo Schwanke ( February /2017 – 2018)
