= 2016 KML Playoffs =

Estonia Basketball League

The 2016 KML Playoffs was the final phase of the 2015–16 KML season. The playoffs began on 14 April and ended on 27 May. The tournament concluded with Kalev/Cramo defeating TÜ/Rock 4 games to 1 in the finals. Rolands Freimanis was named KML Finals MVP.

== Bracket ==
Quarterfinals
1	Kalev/Cramo	3
8	Valga-Valka/Maks & Moorits	0
4	AVIS Rapla	3
5	Rakvere Tarvas	1
2	TÜ/Rock	3
7	TTÜ	0
3	TLÜ/Kalev	3
6	Port of Pärnu	1

Semifinals
1	Kalev/Cramo	3
4	AVIS Rapla	0
2	TÜ/Rock	3
3	TLÜ/Kalev	0

Finals
1	Kalev/Cramo	4
2	TÜ/Rock	1
Third place
3	TLÜ/Kalev	1
4	AVIS Rapla	3

== Quarterfinals ==
The quarterfinals are best-of-five series.

=== Kalev/Cramo v Valga-Valka/Maks & Moorits ===
15 April 2016	Valga-Valka/Maks & Moorits	69–92	Kalev/Cramo	Valga
19:00	Scoring by quarter: 14–21, 21–18, 17–30, 17–23
	Pts: Aleksejevs 17; Rebs: Aleksejevs 9 Asts: Aleksejevs, Kriisa 3 PIR: Aleksejevs 28	Boxscore	Pts: Sokk 18; Rebs: King 12; Asts: Sokk 6 PIR: Sokk 27	Arena: Valga Sports Hall; Attendance: 150; Referees: Madis Allik, Ranno Konks, Ivo Kitsing

17 April 2016	Kalev/Cramo	88–87	Valga-Valka/Maks & Moorits	Tallinn
15:30	Scoring by quarter: 25–22, 18–21, 26–17, 19–27
	Pts: King 16; Rebs: Freimanis 11; Asts: Dorbek, Sokk 5 PIR: Freimanis 22	Boxscore	Pts: Berķis, E. Krūmiņš 17; Rebs: Aleksejevs, Kanbergs 8 Asts: Saage 5 PIR: Aleksejevs 21	Arena: Audentes Sports Centre; Attendance: 150; Referees: Mart Uuehendrik, Mihkel Männiste, Indrek Kelement

26 April 2016	Kalev/Cramo	80–68	Valga-Valka/Maks & Moorits	Haapsalu
18:30	Scoring by quarter: 21–16, 33–17, 17–21, 9–14
	Pts: Veideman 20; Rebs: Freimanis 10; Asts: Sokk 3 PIR: Veideman 29	Boxscore	Pts: Kriisa, E. Krūmiņš 17; Rebs: Aleksejevs 8 Asts: Saage 3 PIR: Kriisa 22	Arena: Wiedemann Sports Hall; Attendance: 500; Referees: Tanel Suslov, Jegor Mitrofanski, Toomas Nõmmiste

=== TÜ/Rock v TTÜ ===
15 April 2016	TÜ/Rock	103–58	TTÜ	Tartu
19:00	Scoring by quarter: 26–16, 28–13, 30–17, 19–12
	Pts: Kurbas, Talts 16; Rebs: three players 7 Asts: Kurbas, Žabas 5 PIR: Kurbas 26	Boxscore	Pts: Akenpärg 15; Rebs: Kitsing 7 Asts: Akenpärg, Laane 5 PIR: Laane 17	Arena: University of Tartu Sports Hall; Attendance: 300; Referees: Mart Uuehendrik, Mihkel Männiste, Toomas Nõmmiste

19 April 2016	TTÜ	82–100	TÜ/Rock	Tallinn
18:30	Scoring by quarter: 21–28, 28–21, 12–28, 21–23
	Pts: Kitsing 26; Rebs: Kitsing 7 Asts: Akenpärg, Laane 4 PIR: Kitsing 29	Boxscore	Pts: Žabas 25; Rebs: Petrukonis 9 Asts: Žabas 6 PIR: Kurbas, Žabas 26	Arena: TTÜ Sports Hall; Attendance: 200; Referees: Rain Peerandi, Ranno Konks, Ivo Kitsing

21 April 2016	TÜ/Rock	107–73	TTÜ	Tartu
19:00	Scoring by quarter: 30–18, 23–16, 17–18, 37–21
	Pts: Žabas 42; Rebs: Petrukonis 12; Asts: Petrukonis, Žabas 5 PIR: Žabas 54	Boxscore	Pts: Kitsing 24; Rebs: Kaja, Kitsing 8 Asts: Laane 5 PIR: Kitsing 35	Arena: University of Tartu Sports Hall; Attendance: 310; Referees: Madis Allik, Jegor Mitrofanski, Rauno Peerandi

=== TLÜ/Kalev v Port of Pärnu ===
14 April 2016	TLÜ/Kalev	75–70	Port of Pärnu	Tallinn
19:15	Scoring by quarter: 18–19, 23–16, 17–17, 17–18
	Pts: Berhanemeskel 25; Rebs: Milka 7 Asts: three players 2 PIR: Berhanemeskel 24	Boxscore	Pts: Järveläinen 23; Rebs: Dorris 8 Asts: Dorris 5 PIR: Järveläinen 19	Arena: Audentes Sports Centre; Attendance: 400; Referees: Aare Halliko, Aleksei Mohov, Ivo Kitsing

17 April 2016	Port of Pärnu	68–75	TLÜ/Kalev	Pärnu
17:00	Scoring by quarter: 23–19, 17–13, 17–23, 11–20
	Pts: Valge 16; Rebs: Petrilevičius 11; Asts: Petrilevičius 5 PIR: Petrilevičius 17	Boxscore	Pts: Berhanemeskel 20; Rebs: Droney, Milka 11; Asts: three players 2 PIR: Milka 27	Arena: Pärnu Sports Hall; Attendance: 500; Referees: Tanel Suslov, Janek Saluse, Rauno Peerandi

19 April 2016	TLÜ/Kalev	83–85	Port of Pärnu	Tallinn
19:15	Scoring by quarter: 24–14, 12–17, 22–29, 25–25
	Pts: Droney 25; Rebs: Droney, Milka 8 Asts: Droney, Milka 3 PIR: Droney 31	Boxscore	Pts: Järveläinen, Petrilevičius 21; Rebs: Petrilevičius 8 Asts: Dorris 7 PIR: Petrilevičius 33	Arena: Audentes Sports Centre; Attendance: 350; Referees: Mart Uuehendrik, Madis Allik, Indrek Kelement

21 April 2016	Port of Pärnu	87–88OT	TLÜ/Kalev	Pärnu
19:00	Scoring by quarter: 20–17, 15–16, 20–18, 16–20, Overtime: 16–17
	Pts: Dorris 21; Rebs: Petrilevičius 7 Asts: Petrilevičius 5 PIR: Petrilevičius 34	Boxscore	Pts: Berhanemeskel 29; Rebs: Milka 9 Asts: Milka 4 PIR: Milka 42	Arena: Pärnu Sports Hall; Attendance: 485; Referees: Aare Halliko, Tanel Suslov, Ivo Kitsing

=== AVIS Rapla v Rakvere Tarvas ===
15 April 2016	AVIS Rapla	86–78	Rakvere Tarvas	Rapla
19:00	Scoring by quarter: 24–21, 13–25, 26–14, 23–18
	Pts: Kemp 23; Rebs: Kemp 13; Asts: Brooks 10; PIR: Kemp 32	Boxscore	Pts: Stumbris 19; Rebs: Haughton 8 Asts: Raley-Ross 7 PIR: Raley-Ross 21	Arena: Sadolin Sports Hall; Attendance: 900; Referees: Tanel Suslov, Rain Peerandi, Jegor Mitrofanski

18 April 2016	Rakvere Tarvas	72–74	AVIS Rapla	Rakvere
19:00	Scoring by quarter: 20–23, 17–23, 17–16, 18–12
	Pts: Raley-Ross 23; Rebs: Goode, Haughton 8 Asts: Raley-Ross 4 PIR: Raley-Ross 22	Boxscore	Pts: Kaldre 19; Rebs: three players 9 Asts: Brooks 5 PIR: Kemp 22	Arena: Rakvere Sports Hall; Attendance: 1,100; Referees: Aare Halliko, Mart Uuehendrik, Madis Allik

21 April 2016	AVIS Rapla	82–85	Rakvere Tarvas	Rapla
19:00	Scoring by quarter: 20–14, 18–28, 26–21, 18–22
	Pts: Brooks 22; Rebs: van der Mars 14; Asts: Brooks 6 PIR: Brooks, van der Mars 29	Boxscore	Pts: Raley-Ross 21; Rebs: Raley-Ross, Strupovičs 7 Asts: Paiste 4 PIR: Raley-Ross 28	Arena: Sadolin Sports Hall; Attendance: 950; Referees: Rain Peerandi, Mihkel Männiste, Ranno Konks

25 April 2016	Rakvere Tarvas	78–81	AVIS Rapla	Rakvere
19:00	Scoring by quarter: 24–28, 17–18, 9–18, 28–17
	Pts: Raley-Ross 31; Rebs: Haughton 6 Asts: Raley-Ross 4 PIR: Raley-Ross 38	Boxscore	Pts: Brooks, Kemp 19; Rebs: van der Mars 10; Asts: Brooks 5 PIR: Kemp 27	Arena: Rakvere Sports Hall; Attendance: 1,400; Referees: Aare Halliko, Tanel Suslov, Mart Uuehendrik

== Semifinals ==
The semifinals are best-of-five series.

=== Kalev/Cramo v AVIS Rapla ===
2 May 2016	Kalev/Cramo	84–74	AVIS Rapla	Tallinn
19:10	Scoring by quarter: 23–16, 15–23, 23–10, 23–25
	Pts: Veideman 20; Rebs: King 16; Asts: Curry 5 PIR: King 33	Boxscore	Pts: Paasoja 19; Rebs: van der Mars 9 Asts: Brooks 3 PIR: Paasoja 20	Arena: Audentes Sports Centre; Attendance: 700; Referees: Rain Peerandi, Mihkel Männiste, Indrek Kelement

4 May 2016	AVIS Rapla	78–83	Kalev/Cramo	Rapla
19:10	Scoring by quarter: 23–16, 15–23, 23–10, 23–25
	Pts: Kajupank 24; Rebs: van der Mars 10; Asts: Brooks 4 PIR: Brooks 23	Boxscore	Pts: Freimanis 16; Rebs: King 11; Asts: Curry 5 PIR: King 26	Arena: Sadolin Sports Hall; Attendance: 850; Referees: Tanel Suslov, Mart Uuehendrik, Madis Allik

7 May 2016	Kalev/Cramo	80–77OT	AVIS Rapla	Tallinn
17:10	Scoring by quarter: 15–20, 19–5, 17–18, 18–26, Overtime: 11–8
	Pts: Veideman 26; Rebs: King 12; Asts: Curry 5 PIR: Arbet, Veideman 21	Boxscore	Pts: Brooks, van der Mars 15; Rebs: van der Mars 12; Asts: Brooks 5 PIR: van der Mars 25	Arena: Saku Arena; Attendance: 500; Referees: Aare Halliko, Jegor Mitrofanski, Aleksei Mohov

=== TÜ/Rock v TLÜ/Kalev ===
30 April 2016	TÜ/Rock	87–56	TLÜ/Kalev	Tartu
17:10	Scoring by quarter: 14–12, 23–17, 26–18, 24–9
	Pts: Žabas 19; Rebs: Talts 9 Asts: Sokk 9 PIR: Petrukonis 18	Boxscore	Pts: Berhanemeskel 19; Rebs: Atkinson 7 Asts: Droney 5 PIR: Droney 12	Arena: University of Tartu Sports Hall; Attendance: 445; Referees: Tanel Suslov, Janek Saluse, Ranno Konks

3 May 2016	TLÜ/Kalev	74–97	TÜ/Rock	Tallinn
19:10	Scoring by quarter: 26–22, 14–26, 16–23, 18–26
	Pts: Berhanemeskel 19; Rebs: Droney 6 Asts: Droney 2 PIR: Berhanemeskel 18	Boxscore	Pts: Žabas 22; Rebs: Talts 10; Asts: Kurbas 4 PIR: Talts 28	Arena: Audentes Sports Centre; Attendance: 450; Referees: Rain Peerandi, Timo Suslov, Ivo Kitsing

6 May 2016	TÜ/Rock	92–76	TLÜ/Kalev	Tartu
19:10	Scoring by quarter: 26–24, 17–22, 25–13, 24–17
	Pts: Žabas 20; Rebs: Doronin 9 Asts: Žabas 7 PIR: Žabas 24	Boxscore	Pts: Berhanemeskel 20; Rebs: Milka 8 Asts: Tamm 3 PIR: Berhanemeskel 29	Arena: University of Tartu Sports Hall; Attendance: 520; Referees: Aare Halliko, Mart Uuehendrik, Rauno Peerandi

== Third place games ==
The third place games are best-of-five series.

=== TLÜ/Kalev v AVIS Rapla ===
12 May 2016	TLÜ/Kalev	82–83	AVIS Rapla	Tallinn
19:00	Scoring by quarter: 26–22, 15–24, 19–16, 22–21
	Pts: Berhanemeskel 27; Rebs: Milka 9 Asts: Tamm 2 PIR: Berhanemeskel 24	Boxscore	Pts: Kemp 27; Rebs: van der Mars 14; Asts: Brooks 5 PIR: Kemp 32	Arena: Audentes Sports Centre; Attendance: 600; Referees: Timo Suslov, Mihkel Männiste, Aleksei Mohov

15 May 2016	AVIS Rapla	81–91	TLÜ/Kalev	Rapla
17:00	Scoring by quarter: 22–11, 16–25, 15–26, 28–29
	Pts: Kemp 21; Rebs: van der Mars 11; Asts: Paasoja 9 PIR: Kemp 32	Boxscore	Pts: Saks 20; Rebs: Milka 9 Asts: Berhanemeskel 4 PIR: Droney, Saks 24	Arena: Sadolin Sports Hall; Attendance: 950; Referees: Tanel Suslov, Madis Allik, Jegor Mitrofanski

17 May 2016	TLÜ/Kalev	66–74	AVIS Rapla	Tallinn
19:00	Scoring by quarter: 22–22, 13–17, 16–19, 15–16
	Pts: Berhanemeskel 15; Rebs: three players 5 Asts: Tamm 4 PIR: Tamm 17	Boxscore	Pts: Brooks, Kemp 13; Rebs: Brooks 13; Asts: Paasoja 6 PIR: Brooks 30	Arena: Audentes Sports Centre; Referees: Aare Halliko, Rain Peerandi, Ivo Kitsing

20 May 2016	AVIS Rapla	79–76	TLÜ/Kalev	Rapla
19:00	Scoring by quarter: 24–14, 14–19, 19–15, 22–28
	Pts: Kemp 34; Rebs: Brooks 9 Asts: Brooks 7 PIR: Kemp 38	Boxscore	Pts: Berhanemeskel 23; Rebs: Milka 7 Asts: Berhanemeskel 5 PIR: Berhanemeskel 29	Arena: Sadolin Sports Hall; Attendance: 1,050; Referees: Tanel Suslov, Mart Uuehendrik, Rauno Peerandi

== Finals ==
The finals are best-of-seven series.

=== Kalev/Cramo v TÜ/Rock ===
16 May 2016	Kalev/Cramo	97–81	TÜ/Rock	Tallinn
19:10	Scoring by quarter: 27–21, 24–20, 25–21, 21–19
	Pts: Curry 17; Rebs: King 9 Asts: Curry, Dorbek 4 PIR: Delaš 28	Boxscore	Pts: Žabas 16; Rebs: Kurbas 6 Asts: Dorbek, Hallik 3 PIR: Sokk, Žabas 14	Arena: Saku Arena; Attendance: 1,950; Referees: Aare Halliko, Rain Peerandi, Mihkel Männiste

18 May 2016	Kalev/Cramo	71–69	TÜ/Rock	Tallinn
19:10	Scoring by quarter: 22–18, 19–22, 11–17, 19–12
	Pts: Freimanis 16; Rebs: King 8 Asts: Sokk 5 PIR: King 21	Boxscore	Pts: Sokk 17; Rebs: Talts 10; Asts: four players 2 PIR: Kurbas 22	Arena: Saku Arena; Attendance: 1,720; Referees: Tanel Suslov, Mart Uuehendrik, Ranno Konks

23 May 2016	TÜ/Rock	75–68	Kalev/Cramo	Tartu
19:10	Scoring by quarter: 20–21, 18–23, 17–15, 20–9
	Pts: Harper, Sokk 11; Rebs: Harper 11; Asts: Sokk 4 PIR: Harper 16	Boxscore	Pts: King 19; Rebs: King 12; Asts: Curry, Sokk 6 PIR: King 27	Arena: University of Tartu Sports Hall; Attendance: 1,380; Referees: Aare Halliko, Rain Peerandi, Madis Allik

25 May 2016	TÜ/Rock	62–77	Kalev/Cramo	Tartu
19:10	Scoring by quarter: 15–19, 10–13, 16–26, 21–19
	Pts: Žabas 15; Rebs: three players 4 Asts: Žabas 4 PIR: Dorbek, Sokk 13	Boxscore	Pts: Veideman 25; Rebs: Freimanis 8 Asts: Curry 7 PIR: Veideman 34	Arena: University of Tartu Sports Hall; Attendance: 1,550; Referees: Tanel Suslov, Mart Uuehendrik, Mihkel Männiste

27 May 2016	Kalev/Cramo	81–54	TÜ/Rock	Tallinn
19:10	Scoring by quarter: 18–8, 26–15, 20–12, 17–19
	Pts: Curry 19; Rebs: King 11; Asts: Veideman 4 PIR: King 24	Boxscore	Pts: three players 9 Rebs: Žabas 8 Asts: Kurbas 3 PIR: Žabas 12	Arena: Saku Arena; Referees: Aare Halliko, Tanel Suslov, Ranno Konks
