= 2017 KML Playoffs =

Estonian national championships in basketball

The 2017 KML Playoffs is the final phase of the 2016–17 KML season. The playoffs began on 10 April and ended on 22 May. The tournament concluded with BC Kalev/Cramo defeating AVIS UTILITAS Rapla 4 games to 0 in the finals. Branko Mirković was named KML Finals MVP.

== Bracket ==
Quarterfinals
1 | BC Kalev/Cramo | 3
8 | Rakvere Tarvas/Palmse Metall | 0
4 | Pärnu Sadam | 3
5 | TTÜ KK | 0
2 | Tartu Ülikool | 3
7 | TLÜ/Kalev | 0
3 | AVIS UTILITAS Rapla | 3
6 | BC Valga-Valka/Maks & Moorits | 0

Semifinals
1 | BC Kalev/Cramo | 3
4 | Pärnu Sadam | 0
2 | Tartu Ülikool | 1
3 | AVIS UTILITAS Rapla | 3

Finals
1 | BC Kalev/Cramo | 4
3 | AVIS UTILITAS Rapla | 0
Third place
2 | Tartu Ülikool | 3
4 | Pärnu Sadam | 0

== Quarterfinals ==
The quarterfinals are best-of-five series.

=== Kalev/Cramo v Rakvere Tarvas/Palmse Metall ===
| 10 April 2017 | BC Kalev/Cramo | 102–74 | Rakvere Tarvas/Palmse Metall | Tallinn |
| 19:30 | Scoring by quarter: 31–22, 20–15, 25–17, 26–20 |
| | Pts: Liutych 21; Rebs: Keedus 8 Asts: Mirković 8 PIR: Mirković 26 | Boxscore | Pts: Peil 18; Rebs: Lips 12; Asts: Post 5 PIR: Lips 16 | Arena: Audentes Sports Centre; Attendance: 250; Referees: Jegor Mitrofanski, Aleksei Mohov, Ivo Kitsing |

| 13 April 2017 | Rakvere Tarvas/Palmse Metall | 67–89 | BC Kalev/Cramo | Rakvere |
| 19:00 | Scoring by quarter: 18–19, 15–24, 21–31, 13–15 |
| | Pts: Post 22; Rebs: Lips, Post 6 Asts: Post 3 PIR: Post 23 | Boxscore | Pts: Gladness 13; Rebs: Gladness 8 Asts: Mirković 6 PIR: Gladness, Simmons 18 | Arena: Rakvere Sports Hall; Attendance: 220; Referees: Mihkel Männiste, Ranno Konks, Alex Talisainen |

| 19 April 2017 | BC Kalev/Cramo | 104–65 | Rakvere Tarvas/Palmse Metall | Keila |
| 19:00 | Scoring by quarter: 29–22, 34–16, 31–15, 10–12 |
| | Pts: Liutych, Simmons 15; Rebs: Gladness 9 Asts: Tollefsen 6 PIR: Simmons 24 | Boxscore | Pts: Lips 18; Rebs: Lips 9 Asts: Post 4 PIR: Lips 14 | Arena: Keila Health Centre; Attendance: 200; Referees: Mart Uuehendrik, Indrek Kelement, Toomas Nõmmiste |

=== University of Tartu v TLÜ/Kalev ===
| 12 April 2017 | Tartu Ülikool | 76–72 | TLÜ/Kalev | Tartu |
| 19:00 | Scoring by quarter: 18–22, 16–11, 18–18, 24–21 |
| | Pts: Konate 20; Rebs: Konate 11; Asts: Sokk 6 PIR: Konate 26 | Boxscore | Pts: Dželetović 24; Rebs: Dželetović 10; Asts: Dželetović 5 PIR: Dželetović 30 | Arena: University of Tartu Sports Hall; Attendance: 250; Referees: Rain Peerandi, Janek Saluse, Rauno Peerandi |

| 15 April 2017 | TLÜ/Kalev | 68–94 | Tartu Ülikool | Tallinn |
| 17:00 | Scoring by quarter: 27–16, 13–30, 11–31, 17–17 |
| | Pts: Saage 15; Rebs: Saks 5 Asts: Dželetović 3 PIR: Saage, Vahter 10 | Boxscore | Pts: Jois 18; Rebs: Jois 11; Asts: Dorbek, Sokk 5 PIR: Jois 31 | Arena: Audentes Sports Centre; Attendance: 130; Referees: Aare Halliko, Indrek Kelement, Margus Napp |

| 20 April 2017 | Tartu Ülikool | 74–56 | TLÜ/Kalev | Tartu |
| 19:00 | Scoring by quarter: 19–19, 16–7, 17–15, 22–15 |
| | Pts: Konate 20; Rebs: Konate 9 Asts: Sokk 13; PIR: Konate 27 | Boxscore | Pts: Tamm 10; Rebs: Jurtom 6 Asts: Tamm 5 PIR: Tamm 11 | Arena: University of Tartu Sports Hall; Attendance: 270; Referees: Tanel Suslov, Madis Allik, Risto Visnapuu |

=== AVIS UTILITAS Rapla v Valga-Valka/Maks & Moorits ===
| 11 April 2017 | AVIS UTILITAS Rapla | 92–71 | BC Valga-Valka/Maks & Moorits | Rapla |
| 19:00 | Scoring by quarter: 34–11, 15–21, 22–18, 21–21 |
| | Pts: Kajupank 24; Rebs: van der Mars 16; Asts: Bratož 6 PIR: van der Mars 31 | Boxscore | Pts: Mathieu 27; Rebs: Mathieu 8 Asts: Mathieu 4 PIR: Mathieu 41 | Arena: Sadolin Sports Hall; Attendance: 580; Referees: Mart Uuehendrik, Timo Suslov, Ranno Konks |

| 13 April 2017 | BC Valga-Valka/Maks & Moorits | 70–99 | AVIS UTILITAS Rapla | Valga |
| 19:00 | Scoring by quarter: 24–20, 6–34, 10–21, 30–24 |
| | Pts: Kanbergs, Raadik 12; Rebs: Lindmets 6 Asts: Kriisa 3 PIR: Kanbergs 18 | Boxscore | Pts: Suarez 23; Rebs: van der Mars 11; Asts: Suarez 5 PIR: Suarez 22 | Arena: Valga Sports Hall; Attendance: 260; Referees: Aare Halliko, Rain Peerandi, Janek Saluse |

| 17 April 2017 | AVIS UTILITAS Rapla | 94–85 | BC Valga-Valka/Maks & Moorits | Rapla |
| 19:00 | Scoring by quarter: 28–18, 16–31, 26–20, 24–16 |
| | Pts: Suarez 23; Rebs: van der Mars 12; Asts: Suarez 6 PIR: Suarez 31 | Boxscore | Pts: Žvīgurs 26; Rebs: Lindmets 10; Asts: Žvīgurs 4 PIR: Žvīgurs 36 | Arena: Sadolin Sports Hall; Attendance: 630; Referees: Tanel Suslov, Jegor Mitrofanski, Aleksei Mohov |

=== BC Pärnu Sadam v TTÜ ===
| 12 April 2017 | Pärnu Sadam | 82–74 | TTÜ KK | Pärnu |
| 19:00 | Scoring by quarter: 16–24, 31–20, 17–16, 18–14 |
| | Pts: Bubalo 19; Rebs: Bubalo 10; Asts: Kirves, Šeškus 6 PIR: Bubalo 26 | Boxscore | Pts: Raadik 19; Rebs: three players 6 Asts: Järveläinen 4 PIR: Raadik 15 | Arena: Pärnu Sports Hall; Attendance: 400; Referees: Aare Halliko, Mihkel Männiste, Madis Allik |

| 16 April 2017 | TTÜ KK | 78–87 | Pärnu Sadam | Tallinn |
| 19:00 | Scoring by quarter: 19–24, 18–16, 21–15, 20–32 |
| | Pts: Akenpärg 21; Rebs: Raadik 10; Asts: Olmre 4 PIR: Raadik 18 | Boxscore | Pts: Šeškus 21; Rebs: Kirves 14; Asts: Šeškus 5 PIR: four players 23 | Arena: TTÜ Sports Hall; Attendance: 380; Referees: Tanel Suslov, Timo Suslov, Ranno Konks |

| 18 April 2017 | Pärnu Sadam | 85–61 | TTÜ KK | Pärnu |
| 19:00 | Scoring by quarter: 24–18, 16–10, 26–11, 19–22 |
| | Pts: Sutt 21; Rebs: Bubalo 10; Asts: Raap, Sutt 5 PIR: Bubalo, Hallik 26 | Boxscore | Pts: Raadik 12; Rebs: Järveläinen 6 Asts: Olmre 4 PIR: Raadik 12 | Arena: Pärnu Sports Hall; Attendance: 515; Referees: Rain Peerandi, Mart Uuehendrik, Rauno Peerandi |

== Semifinals ==
The quarterfinals are best-of-five series.

=== Kalev/Cramo v BC Pärnu Sadam ===
| 29 April 2017 | BC Kalev/Cramo | 73–71 | Pärnu Sadam | Kuressaare |
| 17:10 | Scoring by quarter: 17–16, 19–20, 22–13, 15–22 |
| | Pts: Keedus 14; Rebs: Simmons 9 Asts: Sokk 7 PIR: Simmons, Tollefsen 13 | Boxscore | Pts: Hallik 16; Rebs: Bubalo 10; Asts: Raap 4 PIR: Bubalo 18 | Arena: Kuressaare Sports Centre; Attendance: 700; Referees: Tanel Suslov, Madis Allik, Ivo Kitsing |

| 2 May 2017 | Pärnu Sadam | 67–77 | BC Kalev/Cramo | Pärnu |
| 19:10 | Scoring by quarter: 18–16, 12–21, 20–22, 17–18 |
| | Pts: Bubalo 20; Rebs: Bubalo 8 Asts: Šeškus 4 PIR: Bubalo 26 | Boxscore | Pts: Sokk 23; Rebs: Mirković 8 Asts: Mirković 5 PIR: Simmons 25 | Arena: Pärnu Sports Hall; Attendance: 535; Referees: Rain Peerandi, Mart Uuehendrik, Aleksei Mohov |

| 5 May 2017 | BC Kalev/Cramo | 83–60 | Pärnu Sadam | Tallinn |
| 19:10 | Scoring by quarter: 15–17, 16–18, 26–15, 26–10 |
| | Pts: Liutych 14; Rebs: Keedus 10; Asts: Sokk 6 PIR: three players 15 | Boxscore | Pts: Raap 13; Rebs: Kirves 8 Asts: Šeškus 6 PIR: Šeškus 15 | Arena: Kalev Sports Hall; Attendance: 900; Referees: Tanel Suslov, Jegor Mitrofanski, Indrek Kelement |

=== University of Tartu v AVIS UTILITAS Rapla ===
| 28 April 2017 | Tartu Ülikool | 60–70 | AVIS UTILITAS Rapla | Tartu |
| 19:10 | Scoring by quarter: 11–22, 12–18, 25–13, 12–17 |
| | Pts: Talts 15; Rebs: Talts 8 Asts: Sokk 8 PIR: Talts 22 | Boxscore | Pts: Bratož 25; Rebs: van der Mars 15; Asts: Kaldre 4 PIR: van der Mars 27 | Arena: University of Tartu Sports Hall; Attendance: 715; Referees: Aare Halliko, Timo Suslov, Janek Saluse |

| 1 May 2017 | AVIS UTILITAS Rapla | 71–58 | Tartu Ülikool | Rapla |
| 19:10 | Scoring by quarter: 19–18, 16–10, 20–12, 16–18 |
| | Pts: van der Mars 22; Rebs: van der Mars 10; Asts: three players 4 PIR: van der Mars 32 | Boxscore | Pts: Sokk 14; Rebs: Milka 10; Asts: Sokk 3 PIR: Jois, Sokk 12 | Arena: Sadolin Sports Hall; Attendance: 1,050; Referees: Rain Peerandi, Mihkel Männiste, Ranno Konks |

| 4 May 2017 | Tartu Ülikool | 85–61 | AVIS UTILITAS Rapla | Tartu |
| 19:10 | Scoring by quarter: 25–20, 18–17, 26–7, 16–17 |
| | Pts: Mandell 20; Rebs: Jõesaar 11; Asts: Milka 6 PIR: Jõesaar 27 | Boxscore | Pts: Paasoja 16; Rebs: van der Mars 6 Asts: Suarez 2 PIR: Paasoja 15 | Arena: University of Tartu Sports Hall; Attendance: 1,170; Referees: Tanel Suslov, Mart Uuehendrik, Rauno Peerandi |

| 6 May 2017 | AVIS UTILITAS Rapla | 79–75 | Tartu Ülikool | Rapla |
| 20:10 | Scoring by quarter: 27–13, 21–17, 11–16, 20–29 |
| | Pts: van der Mars 16; Rebs: van der Mars 16; Asts: Bratož 5 PIR: van der Mars 27 | Boxscore | Pts: Mandell 18; Rebs: Jõesaar 9 Asts: Sokk 5 PIR: Mandell 18 | Arena: Sadolin Sports Hall; Attendance: 1,170; Referees: Aare Halliko, Mart Uuehendrik, Ranno Konks |

== Third place games ==
The third place games are best-of-five series.

=== University of Tartu v BC Pärnu Sadam ===
| 11 May 2017 | Tartu Ülikool | 72–54 | Pärnu Sadam | Tartu |
| 19:10 | Scoring by quarter: 24–15, 16–16, 21–13, 11–10 |
| | Pts: Jõesaar 19; Rebs: Jõesaar 8 Asts: Sokk 7 PIR: Jõesaar 20 | Boxscore | Pts: Šeškus 14; Rebs: five players 6 Asts: Kirves, Sutt 3 PIR: Hallik 15 | Arena: University of Tartu Sports Hall; Attendance: 400; Referees: Rain Peerandi, Mihkel Männiste, Janek Saluse |

| 13 May 2017 | Pärnu Sadam | 58–66 | Tartu Ülikool | Pärnu |
| 17:10 | Scoring by quarter: 14–19, 19–20, 8–12, 17–15 |
| | Pts: Šeškus 15; Rebs: Bubalo, Kirves 7 Asts: Šeškus 6 PIR: Bubalo 24 | Boxscore | Pts: Milka 21; Rebs: Milka 9 Asts: Sokk 8 PIR: Milka 25 | Arena: Pärnu Sports Hall; Attendance: 490; Referees: Aare Halliko, Timo Suslov, Ivo Kitsing |

| 15 May 2017 | Tartu Ülikool | 66–57 | Pärnu Sadam | Tartu |
| 19:10 | Scoring by quarter: 16–18, 20–17, 19–12, 11–10 |
| | Pts: Mandell 14; Rebs: Milka 11; Asts: Sokk 4 PIR: Milka 18 | Boxscore | Pts: Bubalo 22; Rebs: Bubalo 7 Asts: Šeškus 7 PIR: Bubalo 21 | Arena: University of Tartu Sports Hall; Attendance: 450; Referees: Tanel Suslov, Jegor Mitrofanski, Rauno Peerandi |

== Finals ==
The finals are best-of-seven series.

=== Kalev/Cramo v AVIS UTILITAS Rapla ===
| 12 May 2017 | BC Kalev/Cramo | 72–52 | AVIS UTILITAS Rapla | Tallinn |
| 19:10 | Scoring by quarter: 14–16, 16–16, 24–9, 18–11 |
| | Pts: Mirković, Simmons 14; Rebs: Simmons 10; Asts: Sokk 6 PIR: Simmons 21 | Boxscore | Pts: Kaldre 11; Rebs: van der Mars 13; Asts: three players 2 PIR: van der Mars 15 | Arena: Saku Suurhall; Attendance: 3,000; Referees: Aare Halliko, Tanel Suslov, Jegor Mitrofanski |

| 14 May 2017 | BC Kalev/Cramo | 75–72 | AVIS UTILITAS Rapla | Tallinn |
| 17:10 | Scoring by quarter: 23–15, 18–18, 14–23, 20–16 |
| | Pts: Tollefsen 17; Rebs: Gladness 8 Asts: Mirković 5 PIR: Liutych 23 | Boxscore | Pts: Suarez 17; Rebs: van der Mars 10; Asts: Paasoja 4 PIR: van der Mars 19 | Arena: Saku Suurhall; Attendance: 1,200; Referees: Rain Peerandi, Timo Suslov, Mihkel Männiste |

| 18 May 2017 | AVIS UTILITAS Rapla | 74–77 | BC Kalev/Cramo | Rapla |
| 19:10 | Scoring by quarter: 20–13, 18–20, 15–18, 21–26 |
| | Pts: van der Mars 17; Rebs: van der Mars 15; Asts: Bratož 6 PIR: van der Mars 27 | Boxscore | Pts: Mirković 27; Rebs: Simmons 9 Asts: Sokk 7 PIR: Mirković 30 | Arena: Sadolin Sports Hall; Attendance: 1,135; Referees: Tanel Suslov, Mart Uuehendrik, Ranno Konks |

| 22 May 2017 | AVIS UTILITAS Rapla | 62–91 | BC Kalev/Cramo | Rapla |
| 19:10 | Scoring by quarter: 17–23, 15–18, 15–25, 15–25 |
| | Pts: Bratož 22; Rebs: van der Mars 8 Asts: Suarez 4 PIR: Bratož 23 | Boxscore | Pts: Mirković, Tollefsen 18; Rebs: Gladness 8 Asts: Sokk 6 PIR: Tollefsen 27 | Arena: Sadolin Sports Hall; Attendance: 950; Referees: Aare Halliko, Rain Peerandi, Aleksei Mohov |
