= 2015–16 KML season =

Estonian national championships in basketball

Alexela Korvpalli Meistriliiga^{1}
- Season: 2015–16
- Duration: 7 October 2015 – 27 May 2016
- Games played: 123 (Regular season); 29 (Playoffs)
- Teams: 9
- TV partner(s): TV6, Delfi TV

Regular season
- Top seed: Kalev/Cramo

Finals
- Champions: Kalev/Cramo; 8th title
- Runners-up: TÜ/Rock
- Third place: AVIS Rapla
- Fourth place: TLÜ/Kalev
- Finals MVP: (Latvia) Rolands Freimanis

Awards
- Best Defender: (Estonia) Janar Talts
- Best Young Player: (Estonia) Norman Käbin
- Coach of the Year: (Estonia) Alar Varrak

Statistical leaders
Points	(Canada) Johnny Berhanemeskel	20.53
Rebounds	(Netherlands) Thomas van der Mars	10.71
Assists	(Estonia) Rait-Riivo Laane	6.25
- ^{1}Sponsored league name, referring to Alexela.

The 2015–16 Korvpalli Meistriliiga season (also known as the Alexela Korvpalli Meistriliiga for sponsorship reasons) was the 91st season of top-tier basketball in Estonia. TÜ/Rock came into the season as defending champions of the 2014–15 KML season.

The season began on 7 October 2015 and concluded on 27 May 2016 with Kalev/Cramo defeating TÜ/Rock 4 games to 1 in the 2016 KML Finals to win their 8th Estonian Championship.

== Teams ==
Locations of the 2015–16 Alexela Korvpalli Meistriliiga teams

Team	Location	Arena	Capacity
Audentes/Noortekoondis	Tallinn	Audentes Sports Centre	1,030
Kalev/Cramo	Tallinn	Saku Arena	7,200
Port of Pärnu	Pärnu	Pärnu Sports Hall	1,820
AVIS Rapla	Rapla	Sadolin Sports Hall	818
Rakvere Tarvas	Rakvere	Rakvere Sports Hall	2,747
TLÜ/Kalev	Tallinn	Kalev Sports Hall	1,440
TTÜ	Tallinn	TTÜ Sports Hall	1,000
TÜ/Rock	Tartu	University of Tartu Sports Hall	1,650
Valga-Valka/Maks & Moorits	Valga	Valga Sports Hall	561

=== Personnel and sponsorship ===
Team	Head coach	Captain	Kit manufacturer	Shirt sponsor
Audentes/Noortekoondis	(Estonia) Indrek Visnapuu		Peak	Ramirent
Kalev/Cramo	(Estonia) Alar Varrak	(Estonia) Gregor Arbet	Nike	Cramo
Port of Pärnu	(Estonia) Mait Käbin	(Estonia) Silver Leppik	Nike	Port of Pärnu
AVIS Rapla	(Estonia) Aivar Kuusmaa	(Estonia) Indrek Kajupank	Spalding	Avis
Rakvere Tarvas	(Estonia) Andres Sõber	(Estonia) Mario Paiste	Nike	Rakvere
TLÜ/Kalev	(Estonia) Kalle Klandorf	(Estonia) Reimo Tamm	Peak	City of Tallinn
TTÜ	(Estonia) Rait Käbin	(Estonia) Kiur Akenpärg	Erreà	Tallinn University of Technology
TÜ/Rock	(Estonia) Gert Kullamäe	(Estonia) Marek Doronin	Nike	Saku
Valga-Valka/Maks & Moorits	(Latvia) Juris Umbraško	(Estonia) Kristo Saage	SMV	Maks & Moorits

=== Coaching changes ===
Team	Outgoing coach	Manner of departure	Date of vacancy	Position in table	Incoming coach	Date of appointment
TTÜ	(Estonia) Heino Lill	Signed as assistant coach	10 August 2015	Pre-season	(Estonia) Rait Käbin	10 August 2015
Valga-Valka/Maks & Moorits	(Latvia) Varis Krūmiņš	Sacked	12 February 2016	8th	(Latvia) Juris Umbraško	12 February 2016

== Regular season ==
During the regular season teams will play 4 rounds for 32 games (2 at home and 2 away) with following exceptions:

- TÜ/Rock will play 1 round at home against teams other than Kalev/Cramo (1 round at home and 2 rounds away in total).
- Kalev/Cramo will play 2 rounds away against teams other than TÜ/Rock (1 round at home and 2 rounds away in total).

Double points will be awarded to teams winning those games.

=== League table ===
Pos	Team	Pld	W	L	Pts	PCT	Qualification
1	Kalev/Cramo	32	32	0	64	1.000	Qualification to Playoffs
2	TÜ/Rock	32	25	7	57	.781	Qualification to Playoffs
3	TLÜ/Kalev	32	19	13	51	.594	Qualification to Playoffs
4	AVIS Rapla	32	18	14	50	.563	Qualification to Playoffs
5	Rakvere Tarvas	32	16	16	48	.500	Qualification to Playoffs
6	Port of Pärnu	32	13	19	45	.406	Qualification to Playoffs
7	TTÜ	32	11	21	43	.344	Qualification to Playoffs
8	Valga-Valka/Maks & Moorits	32	10	22	42	.313	Qualification to Playoffs
9	Audentes/Noortekoondis	32	0	32	32	.000	

Source: Korvpalli Meistriliiga

=== Results ===
Home \ Away	AUD	KAL	PÄR	RAP	TAR	TLÜ	TTÜ	TÜ	VAL
Audentes/Noortekoondis		46–98	63–77	70–81	71–100	78–96	76–79	58–73	65–97
Audentes/Noortekoondis		56–114	59–90	50–83	68–108	66–83	70–83	68–83	75–103
Kalev/Cramo								83–75	
Kalev/Cramo								78–68	
Port of Pärnu	76–57	73–78		65–86	81–79	88–93	73–57	71–79	86–62
Port of Pärnu	75–65	64–85		68–69	73–68	87–86	68–79	61–70	89–78
AVIS Rapla	78–74	73–80	83–76		92–86	76–97	60–78	74–63	99–93
AVIS Rapla	94–76	82–85	77–61		74–79	78–71	81–94	83–62	83–65
Rakvere Tarvas	124–57	64–90	89–64	90–70		74–72	70–61	72–78	81–86
Rakvere Tarvas	109–84	77–90	103–69	105–78		81–103	88–67	75–89	95–87
TLÜ/Kalev	105–85	59–99	91–83	61–80	86–71		83–78	76–82	104–96
TLÜ/Kalev	107–61	73–86	87–67	90–88	104–103		86–83	84–105	108–97
TTÜ	100–89	84–100	77–86	47–63	59–89	80–69		80–77	73–92
TTÜ	74–63	73–87	70–75	73–86	76–85	94–103		57–92	103–96
TÜ/Rock	94–64	73–81	93–63	74–52	109–104	97–88	77–66		96–63
TÜ/Rock		71–83							
Valga-Valka/Maks & Moorits	105–73	67–95	101–104	68–84	82–104	100–108	76–86	72–86	
Valga-Valka/Maks & Moorits	98–66	62–82	79–71	90–77	90–84	85–106	79–69	76–92	

Legend: Blue = home team win; Yellow = draw; Red = away team win.

== Playoffs ==
=== Bracket ===
The playoffs began on 14 April and ended on 27 May. The tournament concluded with Kalev/Cramo defeating TÜ/Rock 4 games to 1 in the 2016 KML Finals.

Quarterfinals
1	Kalev/Cramo	3
8	Valga-Valka/Maks & Moorits	0
4	AVIS Rapla	3
5	Rakvere Tarvas	1
2	TÜ/Rock	3
7	TTÜ	0
3	TLÜ/Kalev	3
6	Port of Pärnu	1

Semifinals
1	Kalev/Cramo	3
4	AVIS Rapla	0
2	TÜ/Rock	3
3	TLÜ/Kalev	0

Finals
1	Kalev/Cramo	4
2	TÜ/Rock	1
Third place
3	TLÜ/Kalev	1
4	AVIS Rapla	3

== Individual statistics ==
Players qualify to this category by having at least 50% games played.

=== Points ===
Rank	Player	Team	Games	Points	PPG
1	(Canada) Johnny Berhanemeskel	TLÜ/Kalev	40	821	20.53
2	(United States) Brandis Raley-Ross	Kalev/Cramo/Rakvere Tarvas	21	415	19.76
3	(Lithuania) Dominykas Milka	TLÜ/Kalev	30	518	17.27
4	(Latvia) Reinis Strupovičs	Rakvere Tarvas	30	499	16.63
5	(Estonia) Kristjan Kitsing	TTÜ	32	531	16.59

=== Rebounds ===
Rank	Player	Team	Games	Rebounds	RPG
1	(Netherlands) Thomas van der Mars	AVIS Rapla	24	257	10.71
2	(Saint Vincent and the Grenadines) Shawn King	Kalev/Cramo	16	163	10.19
3	(Latvia) Jurijs Aleksejevs	Valga-Valka/Maks & Moorits	29	249	8.59
4	(United States) David Haughton	Rakvere Tarvas	32	252	7.88
5	(Lithuania) Paulius Petrilevičius	Port of Pärnu	27	210	7.78

=== Assists ===
Rank	Player	Team	Games	Assists	APG
1	(Estonia) Rait-Riivo Laane	TTÜ	32	200	6.25
2	(United States) Tom Droney	TLÜ/Kalev	36	178	4.94
3	(United States) Devin Brooks	AVIS Rapla	40	173	4.33
4	(Estonia) Kristo Saage	Valga-Valka/Maks & Moorits	32	135	4.22
5	(Estonia) Sten Sokk	Kalev/Cramo	25	104	4.16

== Awards ==
=== Finals MVP ===
- (Latvia) Rolands Freimanis (Kalev/Cramo)

=== Best Defender ===
- (Estonia) Janar Talts (TÜ/Rock)

=== Best Young Player ===
- (Estonia) Norman Käbin (Port of Pärnu)

=== Coach of the Year ===
- (Estonia) Alar Varrak (Kalev/Cramo)

=== All-KML Team ===
Pos	Player	Team
PG	(Estonia) Sten Sokk	Kalev/Cramo
SG	(Estonia) Gregor Arbet	Kalev/Cramo
SF	(Estonia) Indrek Kajupank	AVIS Rapla
PF	(Estonia) Kristjan Kitsing	TTÜ
C	(Saint Vincent and the Grenadines) Shawn King	Kalev/Cramo

=== Player of the Month ===
Month	Player	Team
October	(Lithuania) Evaldas Žabas	TÜ/Rock
November	(United States) William Artino	AVIS Rapla
December	(Estonia) Kristjan Kitsing	TTÜ
January	(Lithuania) Dominykas Milka	TLÜ/Kalev
February	(Estonia) Gert Dorbek	TÜ/Rock
March	(Estonia) Rait-Riivo Laane	TTÜ
April	(United States) Tom Droney	TLÜ/Kalev

== See also ==
- 2015–16 FIBA Europe Cup
- 2015–16 VTB United League
- 2015–16 Baltic Basketball League
- 2015–16 Latvian Basketball League
