= Audentes Sports Gymnasium =

Gymnasium in Estonia

Audentes Sports Gymnasium (Estonian: Audentese Spordigümnaasium) is a sports school in Tallinn, and with the branch in Otepää, Estonia.

School's history goes back to 1 September 1967 when Tallinn Sports Boarding School (Estonian: Tallinna Spordiinternaatkool) was established in Tallinn. In 1990, the school was re-organized, when Tallinn Sports College (Estonian: Tallinna Spordikolledž) and another sports school (Estonian: Eesti NSV laste- ja noorte spordikool) was merged. New name for the three merged schools became Estonian Sports Gymnasium (Estonian: Eesti Spordigümnaasium).

In 2000, Estonian Sports Gymnasium was acquired by AS Audentes. School was re-organized into Audentes Sports Gymnasium.

== Notable alumni ==
- Tiit Sokk, basketball player, Olympic winner
- Viljar Loor, volleyball player, Olympic winner
- Allar Levandi, Nordic combined skier, Olympic medallist
