= Audentes =

Company based in Estonia

Audentes is a company based in Tallinn, Estonia.

The company was established in 1995 by Tõnis Arro and Tea Varrak under the name AS Fontes PMP, which encompassed the company Fontese Koolituse AS and Fontes Private School. In 1997 the company was renamed to Audentes.

In 2000, Audentes signed the contract with Ministry of Education and Research to rent the rooms of the Estonian Sports Gymnasium. This contract made possible to establish Audentes Sports Gymnasium.

In 2001, Audentes Mainor Business School was established.

The company owns also Audentes Sports Centre, located in Tallinn.
