= Tondi, Tallinn =

Subdistrict of Tallinn, Estonia

Coordinates: 59.408556°N 24.726362°E

Tondi
- Subdistrict of Tallinn
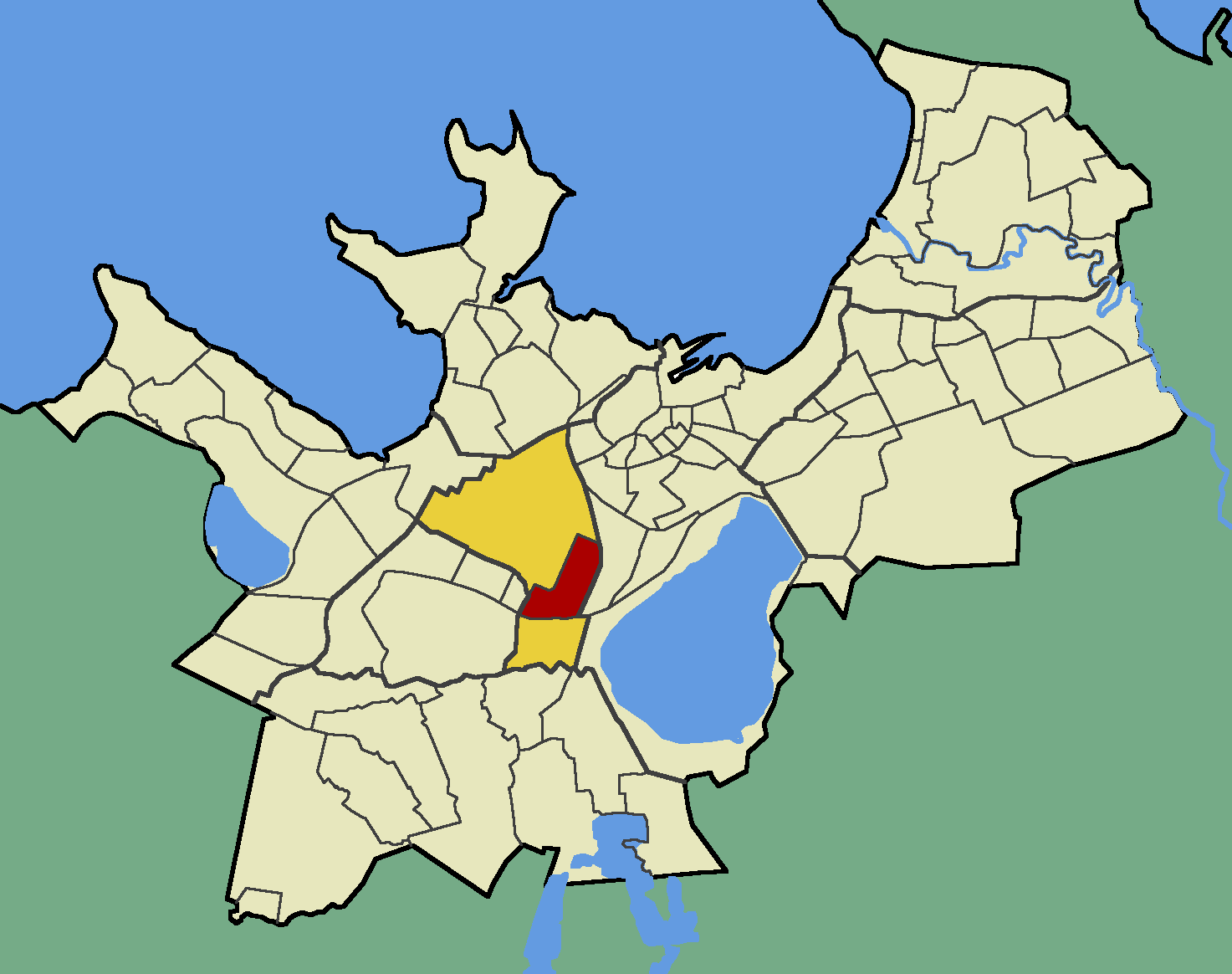
- Tondi within Kristiine District.
- Country: Estonia
- County: Harju
- City: Tallinn
- District: Kristiine

Population (1 January 2015)
  - Total: 3,862

Tondi is a subdistrict (Estonian: asum) in the district of Kristiine, Tallinn, the capital of Estonia. It has a population of 3,862 (As of 1 January 2015).

The Tallinn–Paldiski railway passes Tondi on its eastern side. There's a station named "Tondi" on the Elron western route..

Audentes Sports Center is located in Tondi.

== Gallery ==
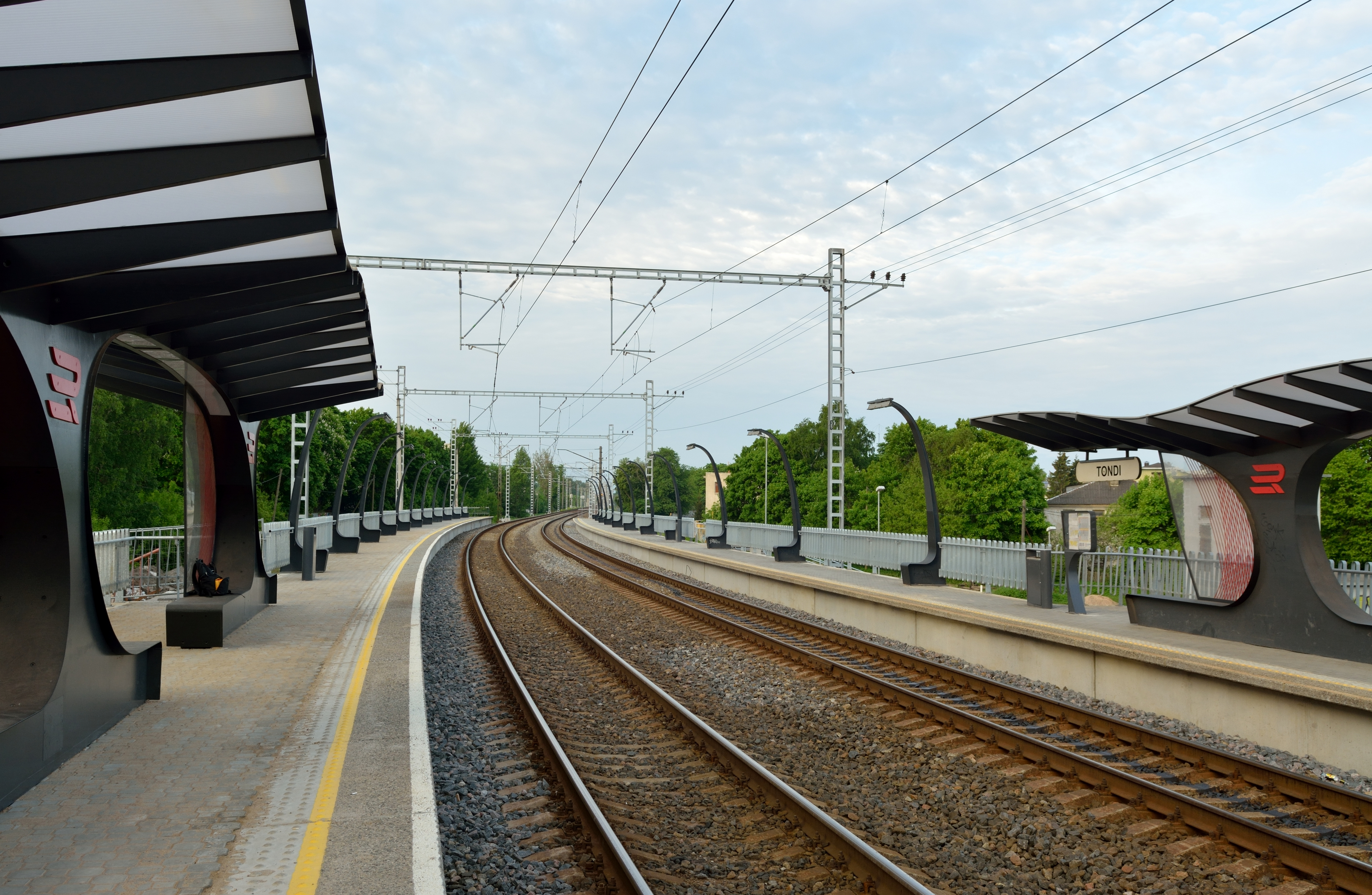
Tondi railway station

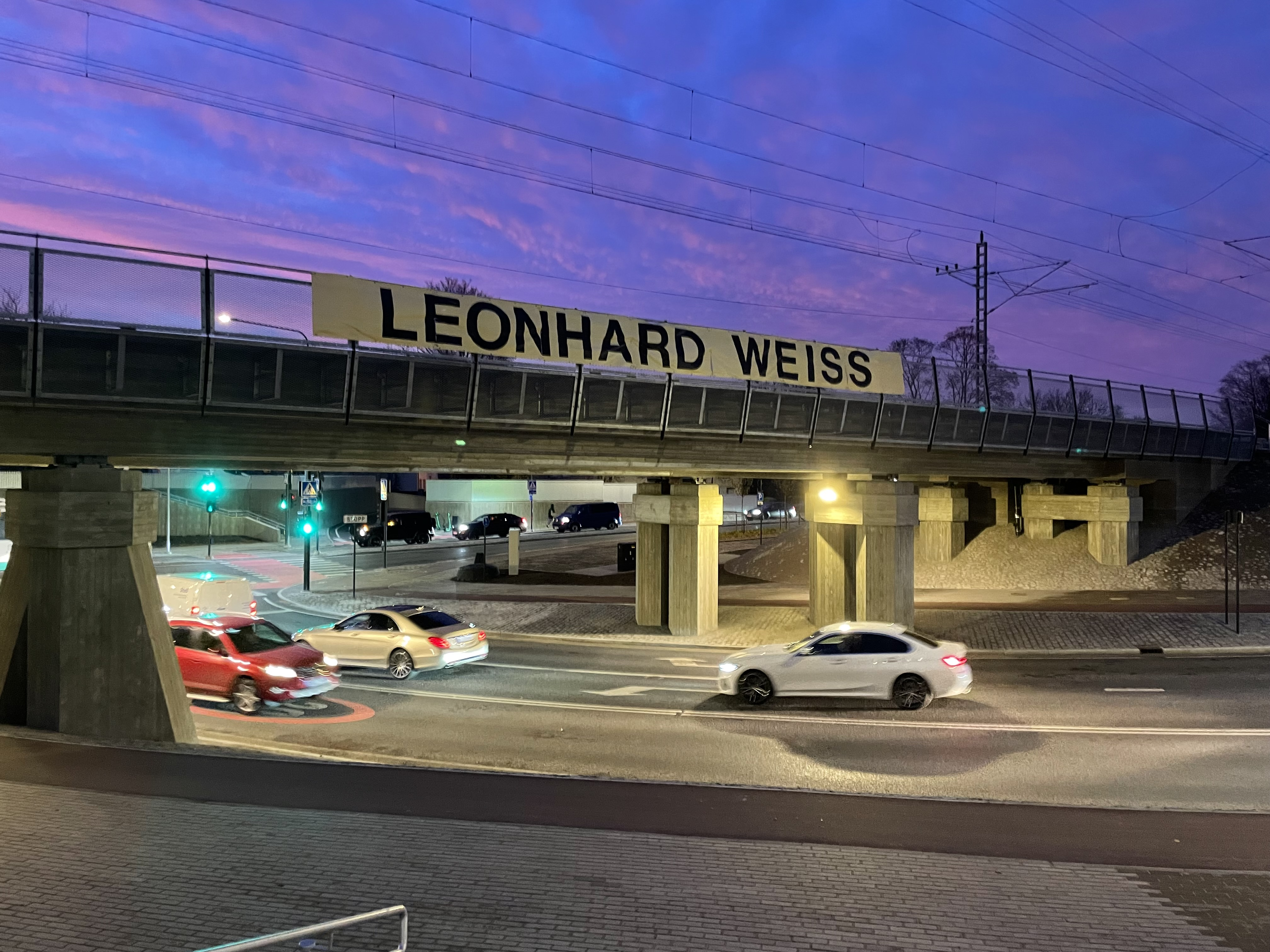
Railway bridge near Tondi station

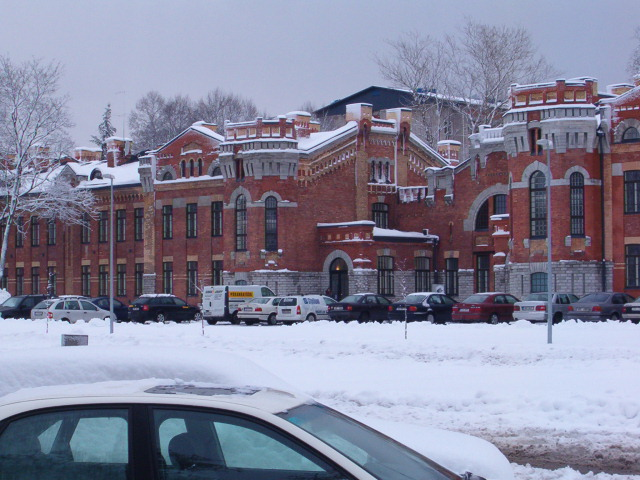
Former Tondi barracks

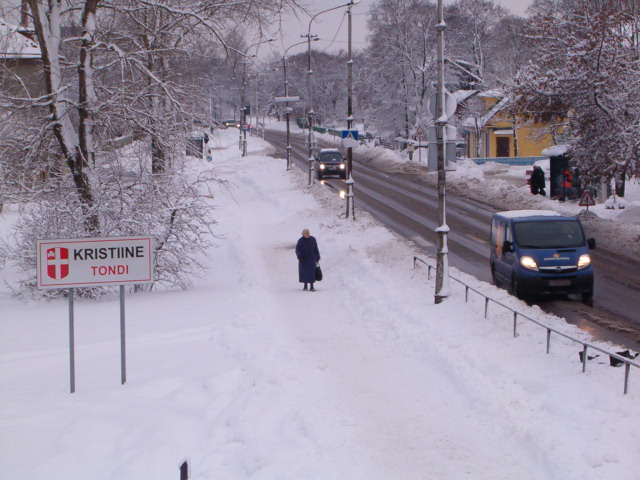
Tondi street

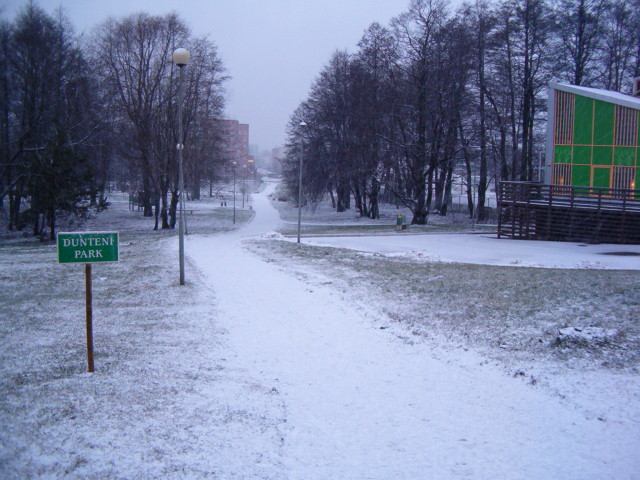
Dunten park

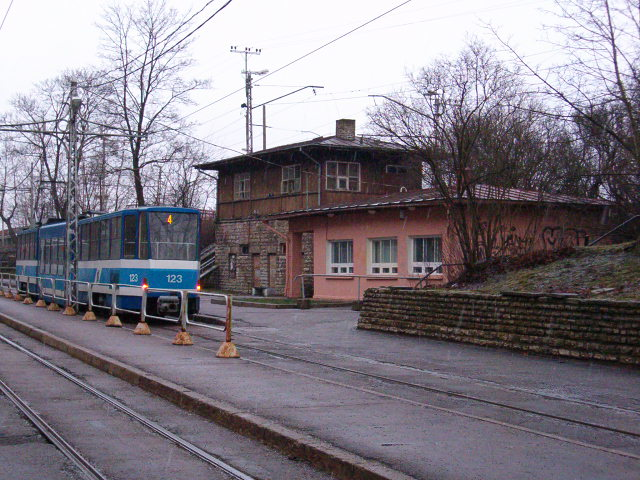
Tram stop

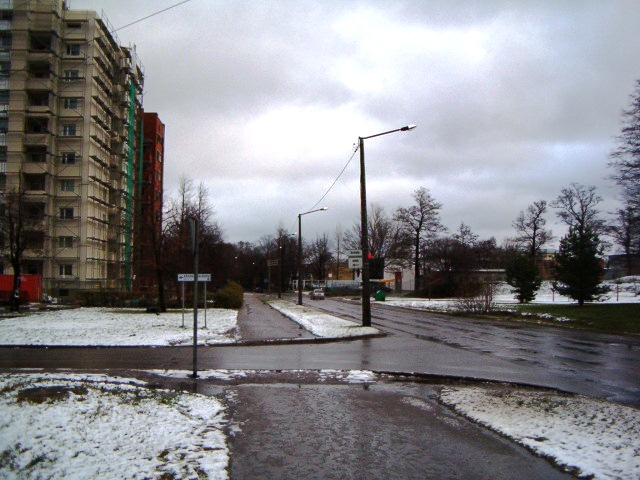
Nõmme street
