= Rolands Freimanis =

Latvian basketball player (born 1988)

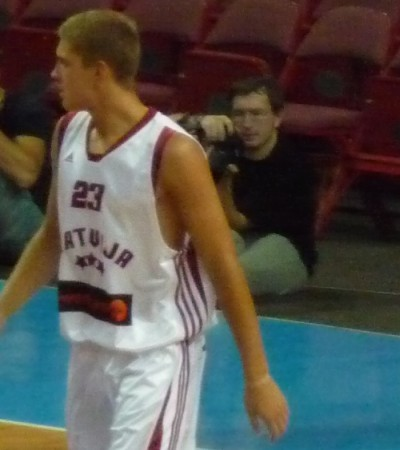
- Freimanis in action with Latvia

No. 24 – Rīgas Zeļļi
- Position: Power forward / center
- League: LEBL

Personal information
- Born: 21 January 1988 (age 38) Gulbene, Latvia, Soviet Union
- Listed height: 2.08 m (6 ft 10 in)
- Listed weight: 108 kg (238 lb)

Career information
- Playing career: 2006–present

Career history
- 2006–2008: ASK Rīga
- 2008–2009: VEF Rīga
- 2009–2010: Qalat Cajasol
- 2010–2011: Lobe Huesca
- 2011: Lagun Aro GBC
- 2011–2012: Girona
- 2012–2013: Sutor Montegranaro
- 2013–2014: Khimik
- 2014–2015: Kalev/Cramo
- 2015: UNICS Kazan
- 2015–2016: Kalev/Cramo
- 2016–2017: Uşak Sportif
- 2017: VEF Rīga
- 2017–2018: Gaziantep Basketbol
- 2018–2019: Ifaistos Limnou
- 2019–2020: Anwil Włocławek
- 2020–2021: Stelmet Zielona Góra
- 2021–2022: Nizhny Novgorod
- 2022–2023: Trefl Sopot
- 2023–2025: Gaziantep Basketbol
- 2025–present: Rīgas Zeļļi

Career highlights
- VTB United League Sixth Man of the Year (2021); All-VTB United League First Team (2021); All-PLK Team (2021); 3x Polish Cup winner (2020, 2021, 2023); Polish Supercup winner (2019); KML champion (2016); KML Finals MVP (2016)

Rolands Freimanis (born 21 January 1988) is a Latvian professional basketball player who plays for the Rīgas Zeļļi of the Latvian-Estonian Basketball League. He plays at the power forward and center positions.

== Professional career ==
Born in Gulbene, Latvia, Freimanis started his career with ASK Rīga where he played until 2008. For the 2008–09 season he went to BK VEF Rīga. After one season there his contract was bought-out by CB Sevilla as he spent next season playing for their farm-club Qalat Cajasol. Following two years from 2010 till 2012 he played in LEB Gold league with short stint in Spanish ACB League with Lagun Aro GBC.

Before the 2012–13 season, Freimanis joined Sutor Montegranaro of the Lega Basket Serie A. On 1 September 2013 he signed with Ukrainian team Khimik. He had strong season with Khimik that included making Eurocup quarterfinals for the first time in club history as well as reaching Ukrainian League finals. Also, Freimanis showed loyalty to his club as he stayed with team despite difficult political situation in Ukraine.

On 26 August 2014, right after completing summer with Latvian National Team Freimanis joined pre-season training camp of Spanish team Baskonia. On 30 October 2014 Freimanis signed with Estonian champion BC Kalev/Cramo. Freimanis played great basketball for Kalev/Cramo, averaging 18.9 points and 6.4 rebounds in the VTB United League when his contract was bought-out by Russian powerhouse UNICS Kazan. On 23 January 2015 he officially signed with UNICS Kazan. Next season he went back to Estonia, signing with Kalev/Cramo. At the end of the season he became Estonian champion and was named Finals MVP.

Freimanis spent the 2017-18 season with Gaziantep of the Turkish league, averaging 8.1 points and 3.9 rebounds per game. He signed with Ifaistos Limnou of the Greek Basket League on 10 August 2018.

On 13 August 2019 he signed with Anwil Włocławek of the Polish Basketball League.

On 28 September 2020 Freimanis signed with Stelmet Zielona Góra.

On 2 August 2021 he signed with Nizhny Novgorod of the VTB United League.

On 4 July 2022 he signed with Trefl Sopot of the Polish Basketball League.

On September 29, 2023, he signed with Gaziantep Basketbol of the Türkiye Basketbol Ligi (TBL).

== National team career ==
He made his Latvian national basketball team debut on 27 June 2007.

On 4 September 2013 he set his career high with Latvia when he scored 24 points in a win over Bosnia and Hercegovina in EuroBasket 2013 opening game.

== Awards and accomplishments ==
=== Professional career ===
Kalev/Cramo

- Estonian League champion: 2016

Anwil Włocławek

- Polish Cup winner: 2020
- Polish Supercup winner: 2019

Stelmet Zielona Góra

- Polish Cup winner: 2021

Trefl Sopot

- Polish Cup winner: 2023

=== Individual ===
- KML Finals Most Valuable Player: 2016
