= Toomas Raadik =

Estonian basketball player

No. 23 – BC Tallinna Kalev
- Position: Small forward / power forward
- League: BLNO

Personal information
- Born: 15 August 1990 (age 36) Pärnu, Estonia
- Listed height: 2.02 m (6 ft 8 in)
- Listed weight: 99 kg (218 lb)

Career information
- NBA draft: 2012: undrafted
- Playing career: 2008–present

Career history
- 2008–2012: Pärnu
- 2008–2012: →Pärnu II
- 2012–2014: Kalev
- 2012–2013: →Kalev II
- 2014: →Pärnu
- 2014–2019: TalTech
- 2019: Jämtland Basket
- 2019–: Bærum Basket

Career highlights
- Estonian League champion (2013)

Toomas Raadik (born 15 August 1990) is an Estonian professional basketball player for Bærum Basket of the Norwegian BLNO. He is a 2.02 m (6 ft 8 in) tall small forward and power forward. He also represents the Estonian national basketball team internationally.

== Awards and accomplishments ==
=== Professional career ===
Kalev

- Estonian League champion: 2013
