= Domen Bratož =

Slovenian basketball player

No. 4 – Terme Olimia Podčetrtek
- Position: Point guard
- League: 1. SKL

Personal information
- Born: March 23, 1993 (age 33) Novo Mesto, Slovenia
- Listed height: 1.89 m (6 ft 2 in)
- Listed weight: 84 kg (185 lb)

Career information
- NBA draft: 2015: undrafted
- Playing career: 2011–present

Career history
- 2007–2013: Krka
- 2012–2013: → Slovan
- 2013–2014: Slovan
- 2014–2016: Tajfun
- 2016–2017: AVIS Rapla
- 2017–2019: Krka
- 2020: Cedevita Olimpija
- 2020–2021: Šentjur
- 2021–2022: Rogaška
- 2022–2023: Podgorica
- 2023: Kožuv
- 2023: Zlatorog Laško
- 2023–present: Terme Olimia Podčetrtek

Domen Bratož (born March 23, 1993) is a Slovenian professional basketball player for Terme Olimia Podčetrtek. He is a 1.89 m tall point guard.
