= Karolis Petrukonis =

Lithuanian basketball player (born 1987)

Personal information
- Born: May 18, 1987 (age 39) Trakai, Lithuanian SSR, Soviet Union
- Listed height: 2.12 m (6 ft 11 in)
- Listed weight: 120 kg (265 lb)

Career information
- College: Clemson (2006–2010)
- NBA draft: 2010: undrafted
- Playing career: 2010–2019
- Position: Power forward / center

Career history
- 2010–2011: Perlas Vilnius
- 2011: Lietuvos rytas Vilnius
- 2011–2014: Juventus Utena
- 2014–2016: Tartu TU/Rock
- 2016–2017: Nevėžis Kėdainiai
- 2017–2018: PGE Turów
- 2018–2019: Pieno žvaigždės Pasvalys

Career highlights
- Estonian Cup winner (2014); Estonian League champion (2015)

Karolis Petrukonis (born May 18, 1987) is a Lithuanian former professional basketball player. He played at the power forward and center positions.

== College career ==
Petrukonis played for the Clemson Tigers men's basketball team from 2006 to 2010.

== International career ==
Petrukonis represented Lithuanian youth national basketball teams multiple times from 2003 to 2007.
