= Kristjan Kitsing =

Estonian basketball player

Personal information
- Born: December 11, 1990 (age 35) Tartu, Estonia
- Listed height: 6 ft 9 in (2.06 m)
- Listed weight: 210 lb (95 kg)

Career information
- Playing career: 2008–2026
- Position: Power forward
- Number: 11

Career history
- 2008–2010: Tartu Ülikool
- 2010–2015: BC Kalev
- 2012–2013: →Pärnu
- 2015–2016: TTÜ
- 2016: Estudiantes Concordia
- 2016–2017: Bakken Bears
- 2017–2018: Tartu Ülikool
- 2018–2020: BC Kalev
- 2020–2021: Rytas
- 2021–2023: BC Kalev
- 2023–2024: Tartu Ülikool
- 2024–2026: TalTech

Career highlights
- 6× Estonian League champion (2010–2012, 2014, 2019, 2023); Danish League champion (2017); Estonian Cup winner (2009); KML All-Star Five (2016)

Kristjan Kitsing (born December 11, 1990) is an Estonian former professional basketball player. Kitsing has also represented the Estonia national basketball team.

== Club career ==
Kitsing started his career with the junior team of the University of Tartu basketball team. In the beginning of the 2008/2009 season, Kitsing was promoted to the senior team. In his first season he averaged 4 points a game with an average of almost 8 minutes in only 11 games. The following season looked a lot better for the Estonian youngster as he averaged 8,7 points in 16 minutes in the regular season, but was later benched for the playoffs although he proved to be one of the best prospects in Estonia at that time. After winning his first Estonia League title in Tartu, Kitsing moved to BC Kalev in hopes of getting more playing time and gaining some experience in the VTB United League. With the new team and a new coach, his decision to change the club proved to be right as Kitsing averaged 6,5 points in 16 minutes, playing in a total of 36 games. He went on to win his second championship.

In the start of the 2011/2012 season, Kitsing scored 11 points against the Lithuanian team Žalgiris. He continued his season putting up pretty great numbers and in the end of the season he won his third Estonian title. For the 2012/2013 season, the forward was loaned to Pärnu to recover from an injury. After spending a season on loan, Kitsing made his Eurocup debut back at his previous club in 2013. By the end of the season Kitsing had won another title to write on his name. The next season his role and statistics stayed the same, but after the team's starting power forward left the club, the situation didn't improve as small forwards were pushed to his position. After the defeat in the 2014/2015 finals, Kitsing left the club. He signed with TTÜ. He played 32 minutes a game averaging 16,5 points and 6,3 rebounds per game. He was voted to the league's symbolic 1st team lineup and later in the summer he had a great qualification tournament with the national team.

After his season, Kitsing moved to Argentina to play for the Estudiantes Concordia in the Argentinian first division, but the player and the team terminated the contract after two months. A week later, Kitsing announced that he would be joining the Bakken Bears of the Danish Basketball League who was also participating in the newly announced Basketball Champions League. At the end of the 2016/2017 season, Bakken won the title of the Danish Basketball League. For the next season Kitsing moved back to his hometown to play with his old club BC Tartu.

On 13 September 2020, Rytas announced an addition of Kitsing for the 2020–21 season.

On July 29, 2021, he signed with Kalev/Cramo of VTB United League.

== Career statistics ==
Legend
GP	Games played	GS	Games started	MPG	Minutes per game
FG%	Field-goal percentage	3P%	3-point field-goal percentage	FT%	Free-throw percentage
RPG	Rebounds per game	APG	Assists per game	SPG	Steals per game
BPG	Blocks per game	PPG	Points per game	PIR	Performance index rating
**Bold**	Career high

=== Domestic leagues ===
Season	Team	League	GP	MPG	FG%	3P%	FT%	RPG	APG	SPG	BPG	PPG
2008–09	Tartu Ülikool/Rock	KML	11	7.8	.447	.333	.529	1.4	.2	.6	.2	4.2
2009–10	Tartu Ülikool/Rock	KML	20	13.7	.641	.500	.595	3.0	.3	.4	.6	7.3
2010–11	Kalev/Cramo	KML	36	16.0	.448	.312	.727	3.6	.6	.5	.4	6.6
2011–12	Kalev/Cramo	KML	26	13.7	.495	.308	.833	2.9	.5	.4	.0	5.3
2012–13	Pärnu	KML	29	29.1	.447	.388	.776	5.3	1.1	.5	.2	10.4
2013–14	Kalev/Cramo	KML	29	17.3	.497	.466	.729	3.8	.4	.5	.3	8.4
2014–15	Kalev/Cramo	KML	26	19.6	.528	.300	.759	4.5	.7	.3	.2	7.3
2015–16	TTÜ	KML	32	31.8	.476	.418	.832	6.5	1.5	.8	.2	16.6
2016–17	Estudiantes Concordia	LNB	8	10.3	.294	.300	.875	.9	.6	.0	.0	2.5
2016–17	Bakken Bears	Basketligaen	31	16.1	.495	.354	.875	3.4	.8	.3	.3	8.9
2017–18	University of Tartu	KML	30	27.1	.522	.441	.766	4.9	1.5	.5	.2	14.8
2018–19	Kalev/Cramo	LEBL	29	19.4	.490	.367	.755	3.9	.9	.6	.0	9.7
2019–20	Kalev/Cramo	LEBL	21	21.6	.486	.430	.804	3.5	.8	.5	.2	10.0
