= Evaldas Žabas =

Lithuanian basketball player

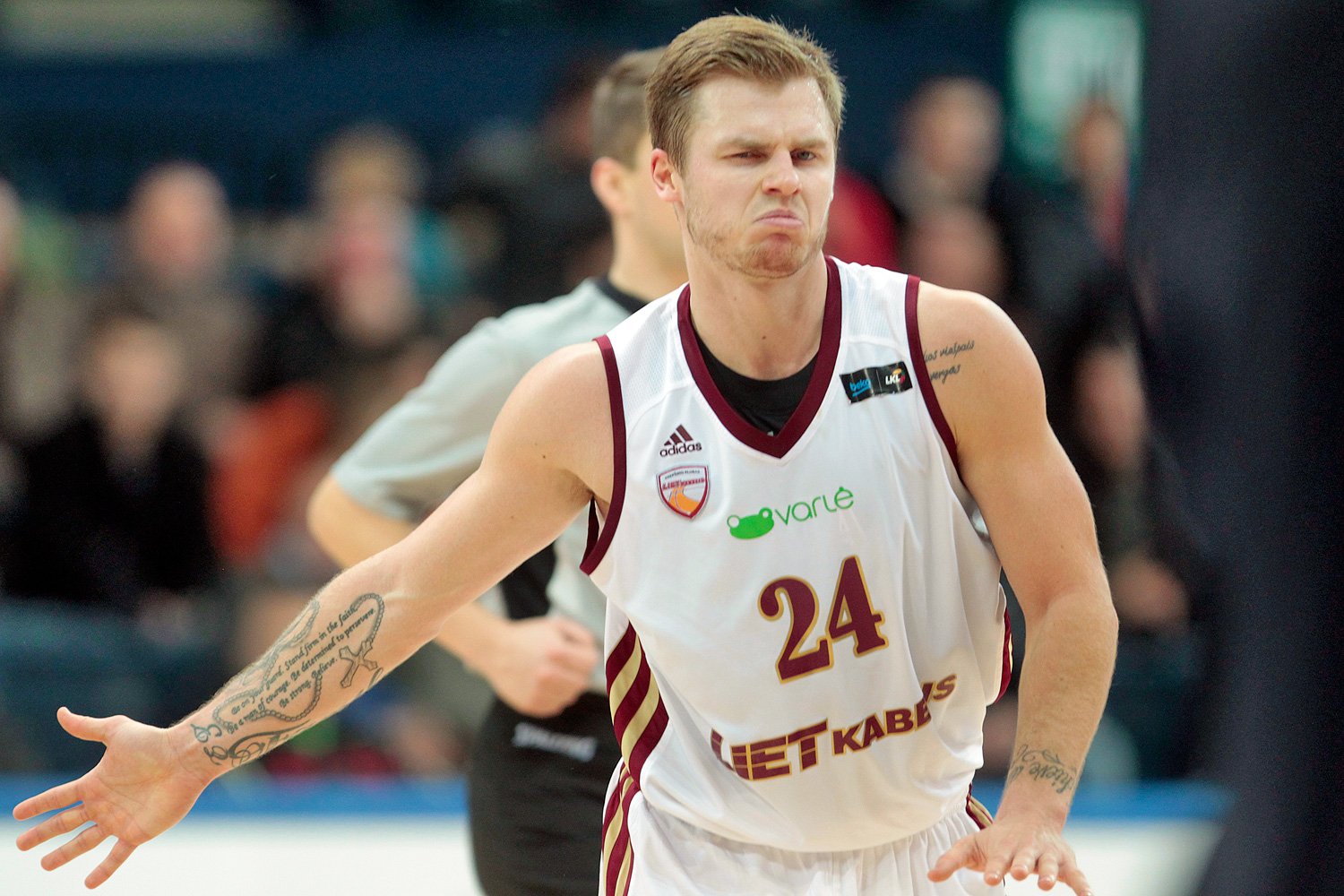
- Žabas with Lietkabelis Panevėžys in 2015

Personal information
- Born: 21 April 1988 (age 38) Vilnius, Lithuanian SSR, Soviet Union
- Listed height: 6 ft 2 in (1.88 m)
- Listed weight: 202 lb (92 kg)

Career information
- High school: St. Michael's College School (Toronto, Ontario)
- Playing career: 2008–2020
- Position: Point guard

Career history
- 2008–2009: Eisbären Bremerhaven
- 2009: Worcester Wolves
- 2009–2010: Worthing Thunder
- 2010–2011: Plymouth Raiders
- 2011–2012: Jämtland
- 2012–2013: Pardubice
- 2013–2014: Brampton A's
- 2014–2015: Lietkabelis Panevėžys
- 2015–2016: Tartu
- 2016: Rethymno Cretan Kings
- 2016–2017: Pieno Žvaigždės
- 2017–2018: Leuven Bears
- 2019: TAU Castelló
- 2019: Njarðvík
- 2020: Umeå BSKT

Career highlights
- LKL All-Star (2015)
Medals
Men's basketball
Representing Lithuania
FIBA Europe Under-20 Championship
Silver medal – second place	2008 Latvia	National Team

Evaldas Žabas (born 21 April 1988 in Vilnius, Lithuanian SSR) is a Lithuanian former professional basketball player. He plays the point guard position.

== Club career ==
Žabas moved to Canada from his native Lithuania when he was 15 years old and played at St. Michael's College School. He averaged about 40 points per game his senior year. After graduating in 2007, he played in Europe for several years, most notably for the British Basketball League's Plymouth Raiders and Sweden Basketligan's Jamtland Basket, leading the latter league and team in points per game (21.9).

In 2013, he returned to Canada and played for Brampton A's during its debut season. In 2014, he signed with Lithuania's BC Lietkabelis. He led the team with 14.3 points and 3.5 assists per game and achieved recognition for his excellent performance against Lietuvos Rytas and Žalgiris at the end of the season.

On July 25, 2016, Žabas joined Rethymno Cretan Kings of the Greek Basket League. However, he left the team to join BC Pieno Žvaigždės.

In June 2019, signed with Úrvalsdeild karla club Njarðvík. He was released by Njarðvík on 21 October 2019 after appearing in three games where he averaged 12.0 points and 3.3 assists.

== International career ==
Žabas represented Lithuania at the 2008 FIBA Europe Under-20 Championship, which won a silver medal. He averaged 2.8 points, 1.0 rebounds and 0.3 assists per game.
