= Kaido Saks =

Estonian basketball player

No. 10 – Keila Basket
- Title: Assistant coach
- League: Eesti Korvpalli Meistriliiga(KML); Latvian–Estonian Basketball League; European North Basketball League(ENBL)

Personal information
- Born: July 24, 1986 (age 40) Estonia
- Listed height: 6 ft 10 in (2.08 m)
- Listed weight: 207 lb (94 kg)

Career information
- Playing career: 2005–2025
- Position: Small forward

Career history

Playing
- 2005–2007: Tallinna Kalev
- 2008–2010: TTÜ
- 2010–2012: BC Kalev
- 2012–2013: Rakvere Tarvas
- 2013–2014: Tallinna Kalev
- 2014–2015: Bakken Bears
- 2015–2020: TLÜ/Kalev
- 2020–2022: Rakvere Tarvas
- 2022–2025: Keila Basket

Coaching
- 2025–present: Keila Basket (assistant)

Kaido Saks (born 24 July 1986) is an Estonian professional basketball coach and former player who currently serves as an assistant coach for Keila Coolbet of the Estonian-Latvian Basketball League.

== International career ==
Saks was a member of the Estonia national basketball team in 2010–2012.
