= Joonas Järveläinen =

Estonian basketball player (born 1990)

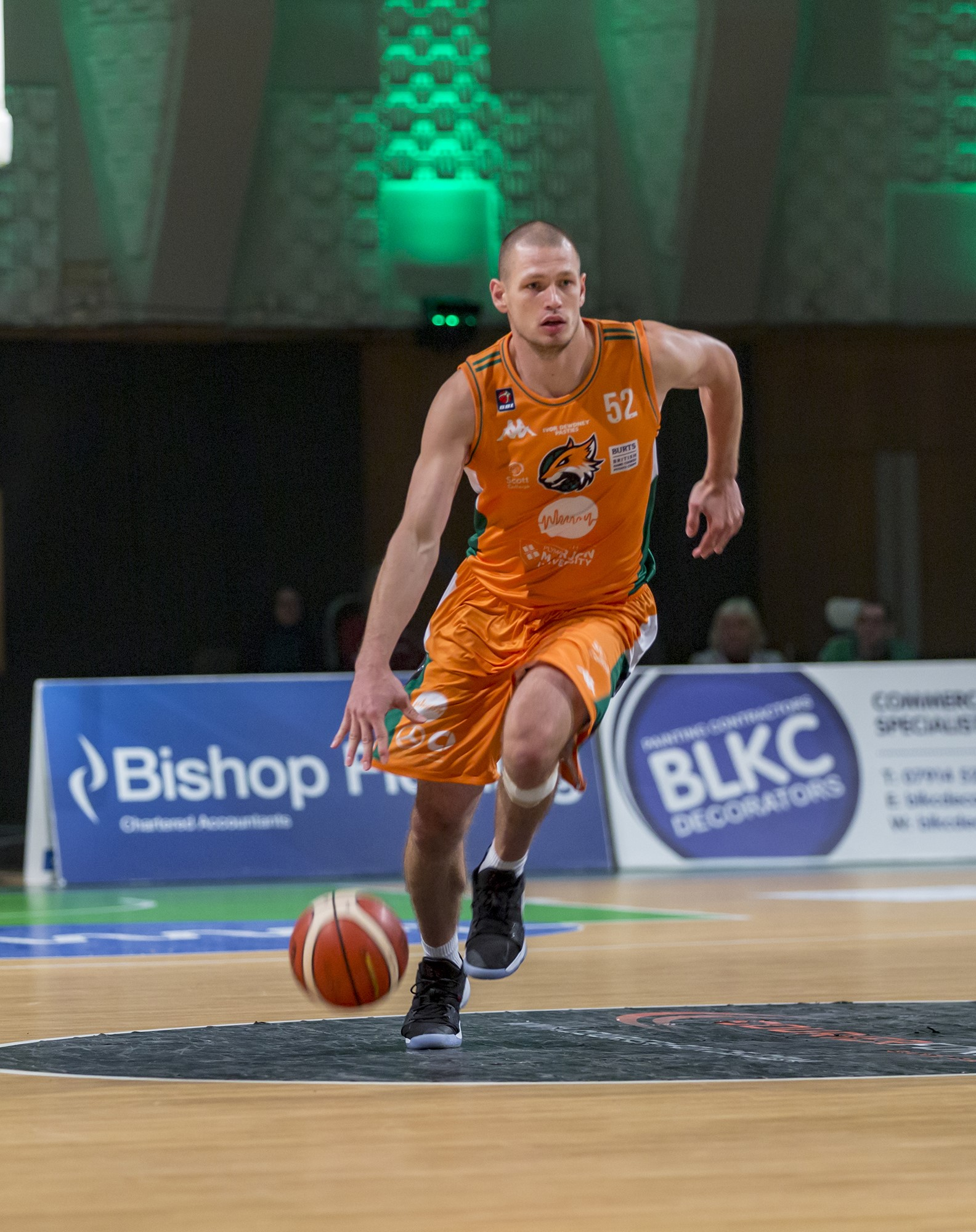

Personal information
- Born: 17 August 1990 (age 35) Paide, Estonia
- Listed height: 2.00 m (6 ft 7 in)
- Listed weight: 112 kg (247 lb)

Career information
- Playing career: 2010–present
- Position: Small forward / power forward
- Number: 52

Career history
- 2010–2011: University of Tartu
- 2011: Rapla
- 2011: Rakvere Tarvas
- 2011–2013: Valga
- 2013–2015: TTÜ
- 2015: Pärnu
- 2015: Latina Basket
- 2016: Pärnu
- 2016–2017: TTÜ
- 2017–2019: Plymouth Raiders
- 2019–2020: TTÜ
- 2020–2021: Grindavík
- 2021–2022: BC Tallinna Kalev

Career highlights
- Estonian Cup winner (2010)

Joonas Järveläinen (17 August 1990) is an Estonian professional basketball player. He is a 2.00 m (6 ft 7 in) tall power forward.

== Professional career ==
Järveläinen won the Estonian Basketball Cup in 2010 with University of Tartu. From 2013 to 2015, he played for TTÜ. In 2015, he joined Pärnu.

In August 2020, Järveläinen signed with Grindavík of the Icelandic top-tier Úrvalsdeild karla.

== Estonian national team ==
Järveläinen is a member of the Estonia national basketball team since 2015.

== Awards and accomplishments ==
=== Professional career ===
- 1x Estonian Basketball Cup: (2010)
