= Johnny Berhanemeskel =

Canadian basketball player

No. 9 – JL Bourg
- Position: Shooting guard
- League: LNB Élite; EuroCup

Personal information
- Born: October 30, 1992 (age 34) Ottawa, Ontario, Canada
- Listed height: 1.88 m (6 ft 2 in)
- Listed weight: 79 kg (174 lb)

Career information
- High school: Lester B. Pearson (Ottawa, Ontario)
- College: Ottawa (2010–2015)
- NBA draft: 2015: undrafted
- Playing career: 2015–present

Career history
- 2015–2016: Tallinna Kalev
- 2016–2017: Araberri
- 2017–2018: Eisbären Bremerhaven
- 2018–2019: Zaragoza
- 2019–2020: Larisa
- 2020: Boulazac Dordogne
- 2020: Ottawa BlackJacks
- 2020–2021: Nanterre 92
- 2021–22: Ottawa Blackjacks
- 2021–2022: Chorale Roanne
- 2022–2023: Budivelnyk
- 2023–2025: Gravelines-Dunkerque
- 2025–2026: Le Mans
- 2026–present: JL Bourg

Career highlights
- CIS Outstanding Player (2015); OUA-Player of the Year (2015); CIS All-Canada First Team (2015); France All Star - Three point shooting contest (2023)

Johnny Berhanemeskel (born October 30, 1992) is a Canadian professional basketball player for JL Bourg of the LNB Pro A and the EuroCup. He plays as a shooting guard when on the court.

== College career ==
He played college basketball at the University of Ottawa, earning CIS Outstanding Player, First Team All-Canadian and OUA Player of the Year honors in his fifth year with the Ottawa Gee-Gees. Appearing in a total of 105 games over the span of his five-year career at Ottawa, Berhanemeskel averaged 19.0 points per contest. He was Ottawa's all-time leader in points scored (2000 points), and first in career three-pointers made (299) when he graduated.

== Professional career ==
In August 2015, Berhanemeskel signed his first contract as a professional basketball player, joining BC Tallinna Kalev in Estonia. Averaging 20.5 points a game, he had an immediate scoring impact in the Estonian top-flight and also saw action in 14 games of the Baltic Basketball League, averaging 18.9 points per outing. For his efforts, he received Eurobasket.com All-Baltic League Import Player of the Year, Eurobasket.com All-Baltic League 1st Team and Eurobasket.com All-Estonian League Honorable Mention honors.

The 2016–17 season saw him turn out 32 times for Araberri of the Spanish second-tier league LEB Oro, averaging 18.9 points per game, while earning Eurobasket.com All-Spanish LEB Gold 2nd Team distinction.

Berhanemeskel signed with Eisbären Bremerhaven of the German elite league Bundesliga in July 2017. He was Bremerhaven's second-leading scorer, averaging 13.9 points a contest in the 2017-18 Bundesliga season.

On July 4, 2018, Berhanemeskel signed a two-year deal with Tecnyconta Zaragoza of the Liga ACB. After starting the 2019–20 season with Greek team Larisa B.C., he was signed by Boulazac Basket Dordogne of the French top-flight LNB Pro A in January 2020. He appeared in eight games of the French league, averaging 14.4 points, 2.4 rebounds and 1.6 assists per outing.

Berhanemeskel signed with the Ottawa Blackjacks of the CEBL in June 2020. On September 18, he signed with Nanterre 92 of the LNB Pro A.

On March 11, 2021, Berhanemeskel re-signed with the Blackjacks.

On July 9, 2021, Berhanemeskel signed with Chorale Roanne Basket of the LNB Pro A.

On August 11, 2022, he signed a deal with BC Budivelnyk of the European North Basketball League and the Champions League.

During the summer of 2023, Berhanemeskel returned to France and signed for a season with BCM Gravelines-Dunkerque.

On August 11, 2025, he signed with Le Mans Sarthe of the French LNB Pro A.

On October 14, 2026, he signed with JL Bourg of the LNB Pro A.

== National team career ==
Berhanemeskel represented Canada at the 2015 World University Games in Gwangju, South Korea. He also represented Team Canada at the 2021 FIBA AmeriCup Qualifiers in Puerto Rico.
