= Paulius Petrilevičius =

Lithuanian basketball player (born 1991)

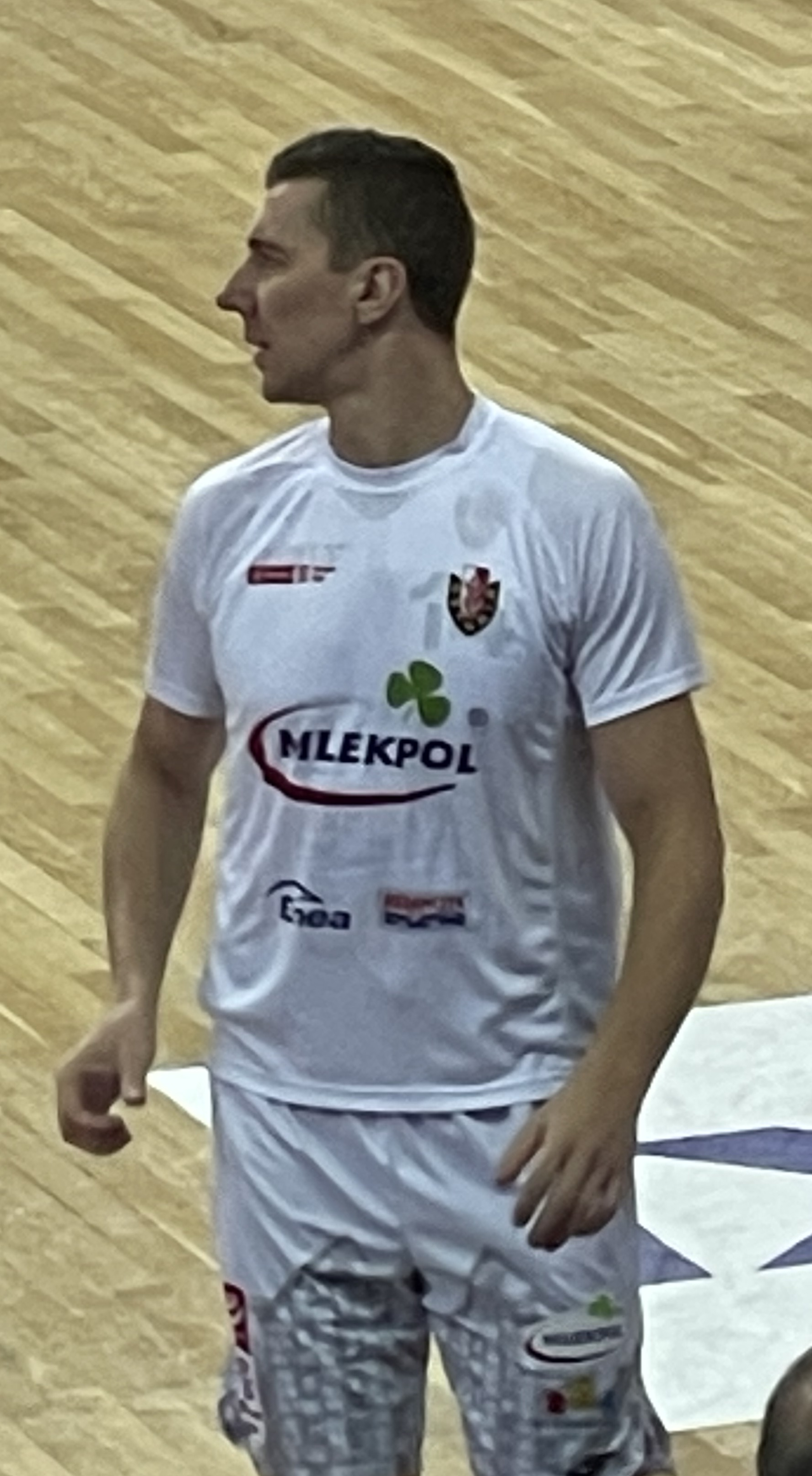

No. 14 – Nevėžis Kėdainiai
- Position: Power forward
- League: LKL

Personal information
- Born: 23 March 1991 (age 35) Kėdainiai, Lithuania
- Listed height: 200 cm (6 ft 7 in)
- Listed weight: 96 kg (212 lb)

Career information
- Playing career: 2011–present

Career history
- 2011–2013: JAZZ-Diremta Birštonas
- 2013: LSU-Atletas Kaunas
- 2014–2015: Sūduva-Mantinga Marijampolė
- 2015: Juventus Utena
- 2015–2016: Pärnu
- 2016–2017: Nevėžis Kėdainiai
- 2017–2019: Dzūkija Alytus
- 2019–2022: Pieno žvaigždės Pasvalys
- 2022: Nevėžis Kėdainiai
- 2022–2023: Astoria Bydgoszcz
- 2023: Rapid București
- 2024–2025: CSM Oradea
- 2025–2026: BC Gargždai
- 2026–: Nevėžis Kėdainiai

Paulius Petrilevičius (born 23 March 1991) is a professional Lithuanian basketball player and the team captain for Nevėžis Kėdainiai of the Lithuanian Basketball League (LKL). Standing at 2.01 m (6 ft 7 in), he mostly plays at the power forward position.

== Professional career ==
Petrilevičius started his career in third-tier Regional Basketball League by signing with JAZZ-Diremta Birštonas.

On 10 July 2019, Petrilevičius signed with Pieno žvaigždės Pasvalys of the Lithuanian Basketball League (LKL). On 2 August 2021, he re-signed with the team for an additional season.

On 3 December 2022, Petrilevičius signed with Astoria Bydgoszcz of the Polish Basketball League (PLK).

On August 13, 2025, he signed with BC Gargždai of the Lithuanian Basketball League (LKL).

On May 29, 2026, Petrilevičius signed two–year (1+1) contract with Nevėžis Kėdainiai of the Lithuanian Basketball League (LKL).
