= Devin Brooks =

American basketball player (born 1992)

Personal information
- Born: August 27, 1992 (age 34) Harlem, New York City, U.S.
- Listed height: 1.88 m (6 ft 2 in)
- Listed weight: 79 kg (174 lb)

Career information
- High school: St. Raymond (The Bronx, New York)
- College: Iowa Western CC (2011–2013); Creighton (2013–2015)
- NBA draft: 2015: undrafted
- Playing career: 2015–2024
- Position: Point guard

Career history
- 2015–2016: Rapla KK
- 2016: Long Island Nets
- 2016: Windy City Bulls
- 2017: AV Ohrid
- 2017: Dynamic Belgrade
- 2017–2018: Balkan Botevgrad
- 2018: Byblos Club
- 2018: PVSK Panthers
- 2019: MBK Komárno
- 2022: Reales de La Vega
- 2023: Cocodrilos de Caracas
- 2024: Motilones del Norte

Devin Brooks (born August 27, 1992) is an American professional basketball player who currently plays for Byblos Club of the Lebanese Basketball League.

Brooks signed with Athletes Untapped as a private basketball coach on July 8, 2024.
