= Dominykas Milka =

Lithuanian-American basketball player (born 1992)

Haukar
- Position: Forward / center
- League: 1. deild karla

Personal information
- Born: 1 August 1992 (age 34) Druskininkai, Lithuania
- Listed height: 203 cm (6 ft 8 in)
- Listed weight: 114 kg (251 lb)

Career information
- High school: Christ The King Regional (Queens, New York)
- College: Saint Rose (2010–2014)
- Playing career: 2014–present

Career history
- 2014–2015: BC Prienai
- 2015: Hiroshima Dragonflies
- 2016: TLN Kalev
- 2016–2017: Tartu Ulikool/Rock
- 2017: Geneva Lions
- 2017–2018: CEP Lorient
- 2018–2019: La Charite Basket 58
- 2019–2023: Keflavík
- 2023–2026: Njarðvík
- 2026–present: Haukar

Career highlights
- Úrvalsdeild karla rebounding leader (2020)

Dominykas Milka (born 1 August 1992) is a Lithuanian-American professional basketball player who has played in Iceland since 2019. He played college basketball at College of Saint Rose.

== Early life ==
Milka was born in Lithuania but moved with his parents to the United States when he was 13. The family settled in New York where he attended Christ The King Regional High School before playing four years of college basketball at College of Saint Rose.

== Professional career ==
After graduating from college, Milka went on to play professionally in his country of birth with BC Prienai. He later played for Hiroshima Dragonflies in Japan, TLN Kalev and Tartu Ulikool/Rock in Estonia. Joined Geneva Lions and won second place in the top league of Switzerland before moving on to France to play for CEP Lorient and later La Charite Basket 58.

In June 2019, Milka signed with Keflavík of the Icelandic Úrvalsdeild karla. On 19 December 2020, he finished with a triple-double, 16 points, 14 rebounds and 14 assists, in a victory against ÍR. With one game left of the regular season, the rest of the season and playoffs was canceled due to the COVID-19 outbreak in Iceland. For the season he led the league in rebounds with 12.1 rebounds and finished third in scoring with 20.9 points per game, helping Keflavík finish in second place in the league. In April 2020, Milka signed a contract extension with Keflavík for the 2020–2021 season. During the season, he averaged 22.8 points and 10.7 rebounds, helping Keflavík to the Úrvalsdeild finals where they lost to Þór Þorlákshöfn. During the 2021-2022 season, Milka averaged 15.4 and 9.6 rebounds. On 30 April 2022, Milka confirmed that Keflavík had terminated his contract. However, on 22 May, it was announced that Keflavík and Milka had agreed on a contract for the 2022-2023 season.

In July 2023, Milka signed with Keflavík's rivals Njarðvík. For the 2025–26 season, he averaged 14.2 points, 8.4 rebounds and 3.3 assists. He left the club in July 2026 after three seasons.

In August 2026, he signed with Haukar.
