= Audentes Sports Center =

Sport venue in Tallinn, Estonia

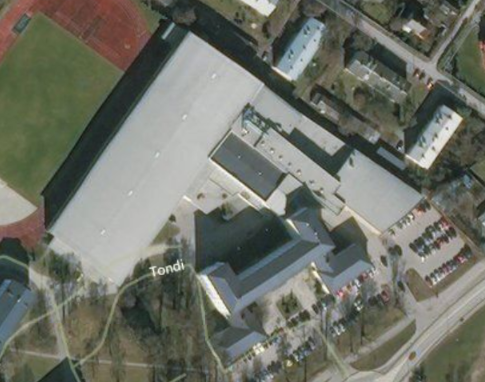
- Interactive map of Audentes Sports Center
- Location: Tondi 84/2, Tallinn, Estonia
- Coordinates: 59°24′19.27″N 24°42′47.55″E
- Owner: Audentes AS
- Operator: Audentes AS
- Capacity: 1,030

Website
- Official website

Audentes Sports Center (Estonian: Audentese Spordikeskus) is a multi-purpose indoor arena complex in Tallinn. The sports center has a swimming pool, gym, track&field arena, ball halls, a wrestling and judo hall and a tennis center.

It's located in Tondi, a subdistrict of Kristiine.
