= Estonian Women's Volleyball Championships =

Estonian Women's Volleyball Championships are the national volleyball championships for women held since 1925 in Estonia.

== Medalists ==
Year	Champion	Second place	Third place
1925	Tallinna Flora	Tallinna Kalev	Tallinna Sport
1926	Not held		
1927	Tallinna Kalev	ÜENÜTO	Tallinna Võitleja
1928	Tallinna Kalev	ÜENÜTO	Tallinna Võitleja
1929	Tartu EASK	ÜENÜTO	Tallinna Kalev
1930	Tallinna Kalev	Tartu EASK	
1931	Tallinna Kalev		
1932	Tallinna Kalev		
1933	Tallinna Kalev	Tartu Kalev	
1934	Tallinna Kalev	Tartu Kalev	
1935	Tallinna Kalev	Tartu EASK	Tallinna ESS
1936	Tallinna Kalev	Tartu ASK	Tallinna ESS
1937	Tallinna Kalev	Tartu ASK	
1938	Tallinna Kalev	Tartu ASK	
1939	Tallinna Kalev	Pärnu Tervis	
1940	Tartu ASK	ÜENÜTO	
1941	Dünamo Tallinn	Tartu Lokomotiiv	Dünamo Tartu
1942	Not held		
1943	Tallinna Kalev		
1944	Tallinna Kalev	Tartu Kalev	Spartak Tallinn
1945	Tallinna Kalev		
1946	Tallinna Kalev	Tartu Kalev	Spartak Tallinn
1947	Tallinna Kalev	Spartak Tallinn	Tartu Kalev
1948	Tallinna Kalev	Spartak Tallinn	Tartu Ülikooli Spordiklubi
1949	Tallinna Kalev	Spartak Tallinn	Tartu Ülikooli Spordiklubi
1950	Spartak Tallinn	Tallinna Kalev	Tallinna Kalev II
1951	Tartu Ülikooli Spordiklubi	Spartak Tallinn	Tallinna Kalev
1952	Tallinna Kalev	Spartak Tallinn	Tartu Ülikooli Spordiklubi
1953	Tallinna Kalev	TRÜ-EPA	Spartak Tallinn
1954	Tallinna Kalev	TRÜ	Spartak Tallinn
1955	TPI	TRÜ	Tallinna Kalev
1956	Tallinna Kalev	Eesti Põllumajandus Akadeemia	TPI
1957	TPI	Tallinna Kalev	Eesti Põllumajandus Akadeemia
1958	Eesti Põllumajandus Akadeemia	TPI	Tallinna Kalev
1959	Tallinna Kalev	TRÜ	TPI
1960	Tallinna Kalev	TPedI	TRÜ
1961	Tallinna Kalev	TPedI	TRÜ
1962	Tallinna Kalev	TRÜ	Kingissepa Kalev
1963	Tallinna Kalev	TRÜ	Pärnu Kalev
1964	Tallinna Kalev	TRÜ	Eesti Põllumajandus Akadeemia
1965	Tallinna Kalev	TRÜ	Kingissepa Kalev
1966	Tallinna Kalev	TRÜ	Kingissepa Kalev
1967	TRÜ	Pärnu Kalev	Tallinna Kalev
1968	Pärnu Kalev	Tallinna Kalev	TRÜ
1969	Tallinna Kalev	TRÜ	TpedI
1970	Tallinna Kalev	Pärnu Kalev	TRÜ
1971	Tallinna Kaubamaja	TRÜ	Tallinna Kalev
1972	TRÜ	Tallinna Kaubamaja	Tallinna Kalev
1973	Pärnu Kalev	ENSV juuniorid	Tallinna Kalev
1974	Pärnu Kalev	Tallinna Flora	TpedI
1975	TpedI	Pärnu Kalakombinaat	Tallinna Spordiinternaatkool
1976	TpedI	TSIK	Tallinna Kaubamaja
1977	Tallinna Kaubamaja	TRÜ	Noorus
1978	TpedI	Pärnu Remondi- ja ehitusvalitsus	Noorus
1979	TpedI	Tallinna Kaubamaja	TRÜ
1980	TRÜ	TpedI	Tallinna Kaubamaja
1981	Tallinna Ehitustrust	TpedI	TRÜ
1982	Tallinna Ehitustrust	TSIK	Kirovi nim. Näidiskalurikolhoos
1983	Tallinna Ehitustrust	TSIK	Kirovi nim. Näidiskalurikolhoos
1984	Kirovi nim. Näidiskalurikolhoos	Eesti Põllumajandus Akadeemia	TRÜ
1985	Kirovi nim. Näidiskalurikolhoos	Tallinna Tempo	TRÜ
1986	Kirovi nim. Näidiskalurikolhoos	Tallinna Tempo	Vinni Näidissohvoostehnikum
1987	Kirovi nim. Näidiskalurikolhoos	Tallinna Tempo	Vinni Näidissohvoostehnikum
1988	Kirovi nim. Näidiskalurikolhoos	Tallinna Tempo	Vinni Näidissohvoostehnikum
1989	Kirovi nim. Näidiskalurikolhoos	Kalevi juuniorid	Nõo kolhoos
1990	Kirovi nim. Näidiskalurikolhoos	Nõo kolhoos	TSIK / ELNSK
1991	Kirovi nim. Näidiskalurikolhoos	Eesti Spordigümnaasium	Nõo kolhoos
1992	Tallinna Pedagoogikaülikool	Viljandi Volle	Tartu Fortuuna
1993	TPÜ	Viljandi Volle	Tartu Visa
1994	Tartu Stella	Tartu Visa / Prosport	Tallinna Pedagoogikaülikool
1995	TPÜ	Tartu Prosport	Viljandi Volle
1996	Tartu Prosport	Pärnu Võrkpalliklubi	Eesti Spordigümnaasium
1997	Pärnu Võrkpalliklubi	Eesti Spordigümnaasium	Tartu Võrkpalliklubi
1998	Pärnu Võrkpalliklubi	TPÜ	Eesti Spordigümnaasium
1999	ESS Pärnu Võrkpalliklubi	Tartu Ülikool / Tartu VK	Viljandi Volle
2000	Viimsi VK	Tallinna Pedagoogikaülikool	Viljandi Volle
2001	Viimsi Cartini	ESS Pärnu Võrkpalliklubi	Audentese Spordikool
2002	Viimsi Milstrand	ESS Pärnu Võrkpalliklubi	Audentese Spordikool
2003	ESS Pärnu Võrkpalliklubi	Milstrand	Viljandi Metallitööstus/Volle
2004	TPÜ/Cartini	ESS Pärnu Võrkpalliklubi	Milstrand
2005	TPÜ/Cartini	Milstrand	Tartu Ülikool/Eeden
2006	TLÜ/Cartini	Viimsi VK Milstrand	Tartu Ülikool/Eeden
2007	Viimsi VK Milstrand/EBS	Falck Pärnu VK	Tartu Ülikool/Eeden
2008	Viimsi VK Milstrand/EBS	Viljandi Metall/Näitused	Tartu Ülikool/Eeden
2009	GMP/Olympic Tallinn	Viljandi Metall	Tallinna Ülikool
2010	Viljandi Metall	GMP Tallinn	Pärnu Võrkpalliklubi
2011	Viljandi Metall	GMP Tallinn	Tartu Ülikool/Eeden
2012	Viljandi Metall	Viimsi SPA	Pärnu Võrkpalliklubi
2013	Viljandi Metall	Famila/Võru VK	Tartu Ülikool/Eeden
2014	Kohila Võrkpalliklubi	TTÜ	Famila/Võru VK
2015	Kohila Võrkpalliklubi	TTÜ	Tartu Ülikool/Eeden
2016	Kohila Võrkpalliklubi	TTÜ/Tradehouse	Tallinna Ülikool
2017	Kohila Võrkpalliklubi/E-Service	Tartu Ülikool/Eeden	TTÜ/Tradehouse
2018	Tartu Ülikool/Eeden	TTÜ/Tradehouse	Tallinna Ülikool
2019	Tartu Ülikool/Bigbank	TalTech/Tradehouse	Saaremaa
2020	cancelled due to the COVID-19 pandemic		
2021	TalTech/Tradehouse	Famila/Võru VK	Tartu Ülikool/Bigbank

== See also ==
- Estonian Volleyball Championships
